= 2024 BNP Paribas Primrose Bordeaux – Singles =

Singles
- 2024 BNP Paribas Primrose Bordeaux

Final
- Champion: (France) Arthur Fils
- Runner-up: (Spain) Pedro Martínez
- Score: 6–2, 6–3

Events
Singles	Doubles
← 2023 ·	BNP Paribas Primrose Bordeaux	· 2025 →

Ugo Humbert was the defending champion but chose not to defend his title.

Arthur Fils won the title after defeating Pedro Martínez 6–2, 6–3 in the final.

== Seeds ==
The top four seeds received a bye into the second round.

1. (France) Arthur Fils (champion)
2. (Spain) Pedro Martínez (final)
3. (Kazakhstan) Alexander Shevchenko (second round)
4. (Spain) Roberto Carballés Baena (second round)
5. (United Kingdom) Dan Evans (quarterfinals)
6. (United States) Mackenzie McDonald (first round)
7. (United Kingdom) Andy Murray (second round)
8. (Australia) Rinky Hijikata (first round)

== Draw ==
=== Key ===
- Q = Qualifier
- WC = Wild card
- LL = Lucky loser
- Alt = Alternate
- SE = Special exempt
- PR = Protected ranking
- ITF = ITF entry
- JE = Junior exempt
- w/o = Walkover
- r = Retired
- d = Defaulted
- SR = Special ranking

=== Finals ===
Semifinals
1	(France) Arthur Fils	6	6
Alt	(France) Grégoire Barrère	4	4
Alt	(China) Shang Juncheng	5	2
2	(Spain) Pedro Martínez	7	6

Final
1	(France) Arthur Fils	6	6
2	(Spain) Pedro Martínez	2	3

=== Top half ===
First round
Alt	(Netherlands) B van de Zandschulp	6	6
Q	(France) Q Halys	1	2
Q	(France) M Martineau	7	6
Alt	(United States) A Kovacevic	5	1
(Australia) T Kokkinakis	6	7
8	(Australia) R Hijikata	4	5
(France) C Lestienne	6^{5}	2
WC	(France) G Mpetshi Perricard	7^{7}	6
Alt	(Spain) A Ramos Viñolas	6^{0}	2
Alt	(France) G Barrère	7^{7}	6
Q	(France) K Jacquet	5	0^{r}
7/WC	(United Kingdom) A Murray	7	2

Second round
1	(France) A Fils	6	4	6
Alt	(Netherlands) B van de Zandschulp	2	6	1
Q	(France) M Martineau	6^{3}	2
(Australia) T Kokkinakis	7^{7}	6
3	(Kazakhstan) A Shevchenko	6^{2}	6	3
WC	(France) G Mpetshi Perricard	7^{7}	3	6
Alt	(France) G Barrère	6	6
7/WC	(United Kingdom) A Murray	4	2

Quarterfinals
1	(France) A Fils	7^{7}	6
(Australia) T Kokkinakis	6^{2}	3
WC	(France) G Mpetshi Perricard	4	4
Alt	(France) G Barrère	6	6

Semifinals
1	(France) A Fils	6	6
Alt	(France) G Barrère	4	4

=== Bottom half ===
First round
5	(United Kingdom) D Evans	6	6
WC	(France) H Grenier	4	4
(India) S Nagal	2	2
Alt	(France) H Mayot	6	6
Alt	(China) J Shang	6	7
(France) H Gaston	4	5
6	(United States) M McDonald	6^{2}	0
(Spain) R Bautista Agut	7^{7}	6
LL	(France) P-H Herbert	6^{5}	3
(Japan) T Daniel	7^{7}	6
(Switzerland) S Wawrinka	7	6
Q	(Spain) B Zapata Miralles	5	3

Second round
5	(United Kingdom) D Evans	6	7^{7}
Alt	(France) H Mayot	3	6^{3}
Alt	(China) J Shang	1	6	6
4	(Spain) R Carballés Baena	6	4	2
(Spain) R Bautista Agut	7^{7}	6
(Japan) T Daniel	6^{2}	4
(Switzerland) S Wawrinka	4	4
2	(Spain) P Martínez	6	6

Quarterfinals
5	(United Kingdom) D Evans	6^{4}	4
Alt	(China) J Shang	7^{7}	6
(Spain) R Bautista Agut	4	6	1
2	(Spain) P Martínez	6	3	6

Semifinals
Alt	(China) J Shang	5	2
2	(Spain) P Martínez	7	6
