= 2024 BNP Paribas Primrose Bordeaux =

- Date: 14 – 19 May
- Edition: 15th
- Surface: Clay
- Location: Bordeaux, France

Champions

Singles
- (France) Arthur Fils

Doubles
- (United Kingdom) Julian Cash / (United States) Robert Galloway
← 2023 ·	BNP Paribas Primrose Bordeaux	· 2025 →

The 2024 BNP Paribas Primrose Bordeaux was a professional tennis tournament played on clay courts. It was the 15th edition of the tournament and part of the 2024 ATP Challenger Tour. It took place in Bordeaux, France between 14 and 19 May 2024.

== Singles main-draw entrants ==
=== Seeds ===
Country	Player	Rank^{1}	Seed
FRA	Arthur Fils	34	1
ESP	Pedro Martínez	51	2
KAZ	Alexander Shevchenko	60	3
ESP	Roberto Carballés Baena	62	4
GBR	Dan Evans	67	5
USA	Mackenzie McDonald	76	6
GBR	Andy Murray	77	7
AUS	Rinky Hijikata	79	8

- ^{1} Rankings are as of 6 May 2024.

=== Other entrants ===
The following players received wildcards into the singles main draw:

- (France) Hugo Grenier
- (France) Giovanni Mpetshi Perricard
- (United Kingdom) Andy Murray

The following players received entry into the singles main draw as alternates:

- (France) Grégoire Barrère
- (Belgium) ~~Zizou Bergs~~
- (United States) Aleksandar Kovacevic
- (France) Harold Mayot
- (Spain) Albert Ramos Viñolas
- (China) Shang Juncheng
- (Netherlands) Botic van de Zandschulp

The following players received entry from the qualifying draw:

- (France) Quentin Halys
- (France) Kyrian Jacquet
- (France) Matteo Martineau
- (Spain) Bernabé Zapata Miralles

The following player received entry as a lucky loser:

- (France) Pierre-Hugues Herbert

== Champions ==
=== Singles ===
- (France) Arthur Fils def. (Spain) Pedro Martínez 6–2, 6–3.

=== Doubles ===
- (United Kingdom) Julian Cash / (United States) Robert Galloway def. (France) Quentin Halys / (France) Nicolas Mahut 6–3, 7–6^{(7–2)}.
