= 2017 BNP Paribas Primrose Bordeaux – Doubles =

Doubles
- 2017 BNP Paribas Primrose Bordeaux

Final
- Champions: (India) Purav Raja (India) Divij Sharan
- Runners-up: (Mexico) Santiago González (New Zealand) Artem Sitak
- Score: 6–4, 6–4

Events
Singles	Doubles
← 2016 ·	BNP Paribas Primrose Bordeaux	· 2018 →

Johan Brunström and Andreas Siljeström were the defending champions but chose not to defend their title.

Purav Raja and Divij Sharan won the title after defeating Santiago González and Artem Sitak 6–4, 6–4 in the final.

== Seeds ==
1. (New Zealand) Marcus Daniell / (Brazil) Marcelo Demoliner (quarterfinals)
2. (United States) Scott Lipsky / (India) Leander Paes (semifinals)
3. (India) Purav Raja / (India) Divij Sharan (champions)
4. (Mexico) Santiago González / (New Zealand) Artem Sitak (final)

== Draw ==
=== Key ===
- Q = Qualifier
- WC = Wild card
- LL = Lucky loser
- Alt = Alternate
- SE = Special exempt
- PR = Protected ranking
- ITF = ITF entry
- JE = Junior exempt
- w/o = Walkover
- r = Retired
- d = Defaulted
- SR = Special ranking

First round
1	(New Zealand) M Daniell (Brazil) M Demoliner	6	6
(Spain) R Carballés Baena (France) K de Schepper	1	4
(Argentina) G Durán (Argentina) A Molteni	7	4	[8]
(Israel) J Erlich (Austria) P Oswald	5	6	[10]
4	(Mexico) S González (New Zealand) A Sitak	4	6	[10]
(Canada) P Polansky (Brazil) J Souza	6	3	[5]
(Poland) M Kowalczyk (Poland) G Panfil	4	6^{3}
(Argentina) F Bagnis (Argentina) M González	6	7^{7}
(Belgium) S Darcis (Belgium) A De Greef	6^{5}	3
(Australia) A Bolt (Australia) T Kokkinakis	7^{7}	6
WC	(France) M Hamou (France) R Jouan	5	0
3	(India) P Raja (India) D Sharan	7	6
(France) J Eysseric (France) T Lamasine	6	5	[8]
WC	(France) M Janvier (France) L Lokoli	1	7	[10]
WC	(France) G Barrère (France) M Bourgue	2	5
2	(United States) S Lipsky (India) L Paes	6	7

Quarterfinals
1	(New Zealand) M Daniell (Brazil) M Demoliner	3	6	[5]
(Israel) J Erlich (Austria) P Oswald	6	3	[10]
4	(Mexico) S González (New Zealand) A Sitak	6	6
(Argentina) F Bagnis (Argentina) M González	1	4
(Australia) A Bolt (Australia) T Kokkinakis	2	7^{7}	[6]
3	(India) P Raja (India) D Sharan	6	6^{4}	[10]
WC	(France) M Janvier (France) L Lokoli	4	4
2	(United States) S Lipsky (India) L Paes	6	6

Semifinals
(Israel) J Erlich (Austria) P Oswald	3	7	[9]
4	(Mexico) S González (New Zealand) A Sitak	6	5	[11]
3	(India) P Raja (India) D Sharan	6	6
2	(United States) S Lipsky (India) L Paes	2	3

Final
4	(Mexico) S González (New Zealand) A Sitak	4	4
3	(India) P Raja (India) D Sharan	6	6
