= 2012 BNP Paribas Primrose Bordeaux – Doubles =

Doubles
- 2012 BNP Paribas Primrose Bordeaux

Final
- Champions: (Slovakia) Martin Kližan (Slovakia) Igor Zelenay
- Runners-up: (France) Olivier Charroin (United Kingdom) Jonathan Marray
- Score: 7–6^{(7–5)}, 4–6, [10–4]

Events
Singles	Doubles
← 2011 ·	BNP Paribas Primrose Bordeaux	· 2013 →

Jamie Delgado and Jonathan Marray are the defending Champions, but they have not partnered up together.
Delgado partnered up with Ken Skupski, but lost in the quarterfinals to Nicolas Mahut and Nicolas Renavand, while Marray played alongside Olivier Charroin, but they lost in the final to Martin Kližan and Igor Zelenay 6–7^{(5–7)}, 6–4, [4–10].

== Seeds ==
1. (Australia) Carsten Ball / (United Kingdom) Jamie Murray (first round)
2. (Sweden) Johan Brunström / (Germany) Philipp Marx (quarterfinals)
3. (Germany) Michael Kohlmann / (Germany) Alexander Waske (quarterfinals)
4. (France) Olivier Charroin / (United Kingdom) Jonathan Marray (final)

== Draw ==
=== Key ===
- Q = Qualifier
- WC = Wild card
- LL = Lucky loser
- Alt = Alternate
- SE = Special exempt
- PR = Protected ranking
- ITF = ITF entry
- JE = Junior exempt
- w/o = Walkover
- r = Retired
- d = Defaulted
- SR = Special ranking

=== Draw ===
First round
1	(Australia) C Ball (United Kingdom) J Murray	6^{5}	4
(United Kingdom) J Delgado (United Kingdom) K Skupski	7^{7}	6
(Argentina) L Mayer (Spain) R Ramírez Hidalgo	4	6	[1]
(France) N Mahut (France) N Renavand	6	2	[10]
3	(Germany) M Kohlmann (Germany) A Waske	6	3	[10]
(France) J Chardy (Belgium) D Norman	4	6	[6]
(Slovakia) M Kližan (Slovakia) I Zelenay	6	2	[10]
WC	(France) M Gicquel (France) É Roger-Vasselin	1	6	[7]
(Australia) C Ebelthite (Germany) B Phau	3	6	[10]
(Colombia) R Farah (Argentina) H Zeballos	6	1	[6]
(Canada) A Shamasdin (Croatia) L Zovko	2	7^{7}	[3]
4	(France) O Charroin (United Kingdom) J Marray	6	6^{3}	[10]
WC	(France) P-H Herbert (France) A Olivetti	7^{8}	6
WC	(France) R Jouan (France) P-H Mathieu	6^{6}	4
(Australia) J Kerr (Czech Republic) L Rosol	6	3	[8]
2	(Sweden) J Brunström (Germany) P Marx	4	6	[10]

Quarterfinals
(United Kingdom) J Delgado (United Kingdom) K Skupski	2	7^{7}	[12]
(France) N Mahut (France) N Renavand	6	6^{5}	[14]
3	(Germany) M Kohlmann (Germany) A Waske	2	5
(Slovakia) M Kližan (Slovakia) I Zelenay	6	7
(Australia) C Ebelthite (Germany) B Phau	1	2
4	(France) O Charroin (United Kingdom) J Marray	6	6
WC	(France) P-H Herbert (France) A Olivetti	7^{7}	7^{7}
2	(Sweden) J Brunström (Germany) P Marx	6^{2}	6^{4}

Semifinals
(France) N Mahut (France) N Renavand	6	2	[5]
(Slovakia) M Kližan (Slovakia) I Zelenay	0	6	[10]
4	(France) O Charroin (United Kingdom) J Marray	7^{7}	7
WC	(France) P-H Herbert (France) A Olivetti	6^{1}	5

Finals
(Slovakia) M Kližan (Slovakia) I Zelenay	7^{7}	4	[10]
4	(France) O Charroin (United Kingdom) J Marray	6^{5}	6	[4]
