= 2015 BNP Paribas Primrose Bordeaux – Doubles =

Doubles
- 2015 BNP Paribas Primrose Bordeaux

Final
- Champion: (Netherlands) Thiemo de Bakker (Netherlands) Robin Haase
- Runner-up: (Ukraine) Sergiy Stakhovsky (France) Lucas Pouille
- Score: 6–3, 7–5

Events
Singles	Doubles
← 2014 ·	BNP Paribas Primrose Bordeaux	· 2016 →

Marc Gicquel and Sergiy Stakhovsky were the defending champion, but Gicquel decided not to compete this year. Stakhovsky played alongside Lucas Pouille and finished as runners-up.

Thiemo de Bakker and Robin Haase won the title, defeating Stakhovsky and Pouille in the final, 6–3, 7–5.

== Seeds ==
1. (France) Pierre-Hugues Herbert / (France) Nicolas Mahut (semifinals)
2. (United States) Nicholas Monroe / (New Zealand) Artem Sitak (quarterfinals)
3. (Sweden) Johan Brunström / (Israel) Jonathan Erlich (quarterfinals)
4. (Argentina) Máximo González / (Argentina) Andrés Molteni (semifinals)

== Draw ==
=== Key ===
- Q = Qualifier
- WC = Wild card
- LL = Lucky loser
- Alt = Alternate
- SE = Special exempt
- PR = Protected ranking
- ITF = ITF entry
- JE = Junior exempt
- w/o = Walkover
- r = Retired
- d = Defaulted
- SR = Special ranking

First round
1	(France) P-H Herbert (France) N Mahut	6	6
(France) J Eysseric (France) F Martin	4	2
(United States) E Butorac (Australia) T Kokkinakis	6^{5}	6	[7]
(Belgium) K Coppejans (Belgium) N Desein	7^{7}	2	[10]
3	(Sweden) J Brunström (Israel) J Erlich	7^{7}	6
(Argentina) F Argüello (Portugal) G Elias	6^{3}	2
(France) L Pouille (Ukraine) S Stakhovsky	6	6
WC	(France) Adrien Puget (France) Laurent Rochette	4	4
WC	(France) F Serra (France) M Teixeira	6	6
(Slovakia) N Gombos (Estonia) J Zopp	2	4
WC	(France) Q Halys (France) T Lamasine	4	2
4	(Argentina) M González (Argentina) A Molteni	6	6
(Netherlands) T de Bakker (Netherlands) R Haase	6	7^{7}
(New Zealand) M Daniell (Germany) F Moser	2	6^{3}
PR	(Brazil) A Ghem (Croatia) A Pavić	2	4
2	(United States) N Monroe (New Zealand) A Sitak	6	6

Quarterfinals
1	(France) P-H Herbert (France) N Mahut	6	7
(Belgium) K Coppejans (Belgium) N Desein	1	5
3	(Sweden) J Brunström (Israel) J Erlich	2	6^{4}
(France) L Pouille (Ukraine) S Stakhovsky	6	7^{7}
WC	(France) F Serra (France) M Teixeira	5	3
4	(Argentina) M González (Argentina) A Molteni	7	6
(Netherlands) T de Bakker (Netherlands) R Haase	6^{4}	6	[10]
2	(United States) N Monroe (New Zealand) A Sitak	7^{7}	4	[5]

Semifinals
1	(France) P-H Herbert (France) N Mahut	7^{7}	6^{6}	[7]
(France) L Pouille (Ukraine) S Stakhovsky	6^{5}	7^{8}	[10]
4	(Argentina) M González (Argentina) A Molteni	3	3
(Netherlands) T de Bakker (Netherlands) R Haase	6	6

Final
(France) L Pouille (Ukraine) S Stakhovsky	3	5
(Netherlands) T de Bakker (Netherlands) R Haase	6	7
