= 2013 BNP Paribas Primrose Bordeaux – Singles =

Singles
- 2013 BNP Paribas Primrose Bordeaux

Final
- Champion: (France) Gaël Monfils
- Runner-up: (France) Michaël Llodra
- Score: 7–5, 7–6^{(7–5)}

Events
Singles	Doubles
← 2012 ·	BNP Paribas Primrose Bordeaux	· 2014 →

Martin Kližan is the defending champion, but decided to compete in the 2013 Internazionali BNL d'Italia instead.
Gaël Monfils defeated Michaël Llodra in the final 7–5, 7–6^{(7–5)} to win the title.

== Seeds ==
1. (Belgium) David Goffin (semifinals)
2. (France) Michaël Llodra (final)
3. (Spain) Guillermo García-López (semifinals)
4. (France) Édouard Roger-Vasselin (second round)
5. (France) Paul-Henri Mathieu (second round)
6. (France) Kenny de Schepper (quarterfinals)
7. (Ukraine) Serhiy Stakhovsky (first round)
8. (Argentina) Martín Alund (quarterfinals)

== Draw ==
=== Key ===
- Q = Qualifier
- WC = Wild card
- LL = Lucky loser
- Alt = Alternate
- SE = Special exempt
- PR = Protected ranking
- ITF = ITF entry
- JE = Junior exempt
- w/o = Walkover
- r = Retired
- d = Defaulted
- SR = Special ranking

=== Finals ===
Semifinals
1	(Belgium) David Goffin	7	1	5
WC	(France) Gaël Monfils	5	6	7
3	(Spain) Guillermo García-López	4	6	6^{4}
2	(France) Michaël Llodra	6	3	7^{7}

Final
WC	(France) Gaël Monfils	7	7^{7}
2	(France) Michaël Llodra	5	6^{5}

=== Top half ===
First round
1	(Belgium) D Goffin	6	6
(Portugal) G Elias	4	2
(Argentina) F Delbonis	2	6	4
(Brazil) J Souza	6	4	6
Q	(France) J Dasnières de Veigy	6	4	6
(Portugal) J Sousa	3	6	4
(Argentina) G Pella	6	4	6^{3}
6	(France) K de Schepper	4	6	7^{7}
4	(France) É Roger-Vasselin	3	6	6
Q	(Kazakhstan) M Kukushkin	6	3	4
WC	(France) J Ouanna	6^{2}	2
WC	(France) G Monfils	7^{7}	6
Q	(Argentina) F Bagnis	7^{7}	7
LL	(Poland) M Przysiężny	6^{3}	5
(United States) R Williams	4	4
8	(Argentina) M Alund	6	6

Second round
1	(Belgium) D Goffin	6	4	6
(Brazil) J Souza	3	6	3
Q	(France) J Dasnières de Veigy	7	2	3
6	(France) K de Schepper	5	6	6
4	(France) É Roger-Vasselin	6	3	3
WC	(France) G Monfils	3	6	6
Q	(Argentina) F Bagnis	4	4
8	(Argentina) M Alund	6	6

Quarterfinals
1	(Belgium) D Goffin	6	7^{7}
6	(France) K de Schepper	2	6^{3}
WC	(France) G Monfils	6	7
8	(Argentina) M Alund	4	5

Semifinals
1	(Belgium) D Goffin	7	1	5
WC	(France) G Monfils	5	6	7

=== Bottom half ===
First round
5	(France) P-H Mathieu	6	6
(United States) S Johnson	1	2
WC	(France) P-H Herbert	5	6	6^{4}
(Belgium) S Darcis	7	4	7^{7}
WC	(France) F Serra	2	7	4
Q	(Spain) P Carreño-Busta	6	5	6
(United States) J Sock	4	2
3	(Spain) G García-López	6	6
7	(Ukraine) S Stakhovsky	4	5
(France) M Gicquel	6	7
(Germany) M Berrer	6^{4}	2
(Romania) M Copil	7^{7}	6
(Germany) J-L Struff	4	7	6
(Spain) D Muñoz de la Nava	6	5	3
Alt	(United States) D Kudla	3	2
2	(France) M Llodra	6	6

Second round
5	(France) P-H Mathieu	5	4
(Belgium) S Darcis	7	6
Q	(Spain) P Carreño-Busta	6	5	4
3	(Spain) G García-López	3	7	6
(France) M Gicquel	3	6	6
(Romania) M Copil	6	1	4
(Germany) J-L Struff	3	4
2	(France) M Llodra	6	6

Quarterfinals
(Belgium) S Darcis	5	6	6^{3}
3	(Spain) G García-López	7	3	7^{7}
(France) M Gicquel	1	6^{6}
2	(France) M Llodra	6	7^{8}

Semifinals
3	(Spain) G García-López	4	6	6^{4}
2	(France) M Llodra	6	3	7^{7}
