= 2013 BNP Paribas Primrose Bordeaux – Doubles =

Doubles
- 2013 BNP Paribas Primrose Bordeaux

Final
- Champions: (Germany) Christopher Kas (Austria) Oliver Marach
- Runners-up: (United States) Nicholas Monroe (Germany) Simon Stadler
- Score: 2–6, 6–4, [10–1]

Events
Singles	Doubles
← 2012 ·	BNP Paribas Primrose Bordeaux	· 2014 →

The defending champions are Martin Kližan and Igor Zelenay, but Kližan decided to compete in the 2013 Internazionali BNL d'Italia instead.
Christopher Kas and Oliver Marach defeated Nicholas Monroe and Simon Stadler 2–6, 6–4, [10–1] in the final to win the title.

== Seeds ==
1. (Colombia) Juan Sebastián Cabal / (Colombia) Robert Farah (quarterfinals)
2. (Germany) Christopher Kas / (Austria) Oliver Marach (champions)
3. (Sweden) Johan Brunström / (United Kingdom) Ken Skupski (first round)
4. (France) Nicolas Mahut / (France) Édouard Roger-Vasselin (first round)

== Draw ==
=== Key ===
- Q = Qualifier
- WC = Wild card
- LL = Lucky loser
- Alt = Alternate
- SE = Special exempt
- PR = Protected ranking
- ITF = ITF entry
- JE = Junior exempt
- w/o = Walkover
- r = Retired
- d = Defaulted
- SR = Special ranking

=== Draw ===
First round
1	(Colombia) JS Cabal (Colombia) R Farah	4	6	[10]
PR	(Argentina) E Schwank (Brazil) J Souza	6	1	[4]
(United Kingdom) J Delgado (Australia) S Groth	5	1
(United States) N Monroe (Germany) S Stadler	7	6
3	(Sweden) J Brunström (United Kingdom) K Skupski	6^{5}	5
WC	(France) P-H Herbert (France) N Renavand	7^{7}	7
(Spain) G García-López (Argentina) DS Schwartzman	4	6^{4}
(Germany) P Marx (Romania) F Mergea	6	7^{7}
WC	(France) M Gicquel (France) R Jouan	3	4
(Israel) A Ram (Brazil) A Sá	6	6
(Poland) T Bednarek (Poland) M Kowalczyk	6	6
4	(France) N Mahut (France) É Roger-Vasselin	4	4
WC	(France) J Ouanna (France) Laurent Rochette	2	6^{3}
(Australia) J Peers (United States) R Williams	6	7^{7}
(Belgium) D Goffin (France) P-H Mathieu	3	2
2	(Germany) C Kas (Austria) O Marach	6	6

Quarterfinals
1	(Colombia) JS Cabal (Colombia) R Farah	5	5
(United States) N Monroe (Germany) S Stadler	7	7
WC	(France) P-H Herbert (France) N Renavand	6^{6}	1
(Germany) P Marx (Romania) F Mergea	7^{8}	6
(Israel) A Ram (Brazil) A Sá	5	6	[9]
(Poland) T Bednarek (Poland) M Kowalczyk	7	4	[11]
(Australia) J Peers (United States) R Williams	6^{0}	2
2	(Germany) C Kas (Austria) O Marach	7^{7}	6

Semifinals
(United States) N Monroe (Germany) S Stadler	6	7
(Germany) P Marx (Romania) F Mergea	2	5
(Poland) T Bednarek (Poland) M Kowalczyk	1	2
2	(Germany) C Kas (Austria) O Marach	6	6

Final
(United States) N Monroe (Germany) S Stadler	6	4	[1]
2	(Germany) C Kas (Austria) O Marach	2	6	[10]
