= 2016 BNP Paribas Primrose Bordeaux – Doubles =

Doubles
- 2016 BNP Paribas Primrose Bordeaux

Final
- Champion: (Sweden) Johan Brunström (Sweden) Andreas Siljeström
- Runner-up: (Argentina) Guillermo Durán (Argentina) Máximo González
- Score: 6–1, 3–6, [10–4]

Events
Singles	Doubles
← 2015 ·	BNP Paribas Primrose Bordeaux	· 2017 →

Thiemo de Bakker and Robin Haase were the defending champions but only de Bakker chose to participate, partnering Matwé Middelkoop. de Bakker failed to defend his title, losing in the quarterfinals to Guillermo Durán and Máximo González.

Johan Brunström and Andreas Siljeström won the title after defeating Guillermo Durán and Máximo González 6–1, 3–6, [10–4] in the final.

== Seeds ==
1. (Argentina) Guillermo Durán / (Argentina) Máximo González (final)
2. (United States) Nicholas Monroe / (Pakistan) Aisam-ul-Haq Qureshi (semifinals)
3. (Poland) Mariusz Fyrstenberg / (New Zealand) Artem Sitak (semifinals)
4. (Sweden) Johan Brunström / (Sweden) Andreas Siljeström (champions)

== Draw ==
=== Key ===
- Q = Qualifier
- WC = Wild card
- LL = Lucky loser
- Alt = Alternate
- SE = Special exempt
- PR = Protected ranking
- ITF = ITF entry
- JE = Junior exempt
- w/o = Walkover
- r = Retired
- d = Defaulted
- SR = Special ranking

First round
1	(Argentina) G Duran (Argentina) M González	6	6
WC	(France) Adrien Puget (France) M Teixeira	4	4
(Netherlands) T de Bakker (Netherlands) M Middelkoop	6	6
(France) J Eysseric (France) A Mannarino	4	2
3	(Poland) M Fyrstenberg (New Zealand) A Sitak	6	3	[10]
(United Kingdom) J Marray (Canada) A Shamasdin	3	6	[8]
WC	(France) T Lamasine (France) A Olivetti	7^{7}	6
(Brazil) R Dutra Silva (Brazil) J Souza	6^{5}	2
(United States) B Fratangelo (United States) T Smyczek	4	2
(Spain) R Carballés Baena (Portugal) G Elias	6	6
(China) Y Bai (Japan) T Daniel	5	1
4	(Sweden) J Brunström (Sweden) A Siljeström	7	6
(Austria) P Oswald (Czech Republic) L Rosol	6	7
(Argentina) G Andreozzi (Argentina) D Schwartzman	3	5
WC	(France) G Barrère (France) Q Halys	4	6	[8]
2	(United States) N Monroe (Pakistan) A-u-H Qureshi	6	4	[10]

Quarterfinals
1	(Argentina) G Duran (Argentina) M González	4	6	[10]
(Netherlands) T de Bakker (Netherlands) M Middelkoop	6	4	[8]
3	(Poland) M Fyrstenberg (New Zealand) A Sitak	6	7
WC	(France) T Lamasine (France) A Olivetti	2	5
(Spain) R Carballés Baena (Portugal) G Elias	1	1
4	(Sweden) J Brunström (Sweden) A Siljeström	6	6
(Austria) P Oswald (Czech Republic) L Rosol	3	7	[8]
2	(United States) N Monroe (Pakistan) A-u-H Qureshi	6	5	[10]

Semifinals
1	(Argentina) G Duran (Argentina) M González	6	3	[10]
3	(Poland) M Fyrstenberg (New Zealand) A Sitak	4	6	[7]
4	(Sweden) J Brunström (Sweden) A Siljeström	6	2	[11]
2	(United States) N Monroe (Pakistan) A-u-H Qureshi	4	6	[9]

Final
1	(Argentina) G Duran (Argentina) M González	1	6	[4]
4	(Sweden) J Brunström (Sweden) A Siljeström	6	3	[10]
