= 2019 BNP Paribas Primrose Bordeaux – Singles =

Singles
- 2019 BNP Paribas Primrose Bordeaux

Final
- Champion: (France) Lucas Pouille
- Runner-up: (Sweden) Mikael Ymer
- Score: 6–3, 6–3

Events
Singles	Doubles
← 2018 ·	BNP Paribas Primrose Bordeaux	· 2022 →

Reilly Opelka was the defending champion but chose not to defend his title.

Lucas Pouille won the title after defeating Mikael Ymer 6–3, 6–3 in the final.

== Seeds ==
All seeds receive a bye into the second round.

1. (France) Lucas Pouille (champion)
2. (France) Adrian Mannarino (quarterfinals)
3. (France) Jo-Wilfried Tsonga (quarterfinals)
4. (France) Grégoire Barrère (semifinals)
5. (France) Antoine Hoang (second round)
6. (Italy) Gianluca Mager (quarterfinals)
7. (Germany) Oscar Otte (third round)
8. (United States) Marcos Giron (third round)
9. (Sweden) Mikael Ymer (final)
10. (Belgium) Kimmer Coppejans (second round)
11. (Slovakia) Filip Horanský (semifinals)
12. (France) Quentin Halys (quarterfinals)
13. (Italy) Roberto Marcora (second round)
14. (France) Maxime Janvier (third round)
15. (Czech Republic) Zdeněk Kolář (third round)
16. (Spain) Tommy Robredo (third round)

== Draw ==
=== Key ===
- Q = Qualifier
- WC = Wild card
- LL = Lucky loser
- Alt = Alternate
- SE = Special exempt
- PR = Protected ranking
- ITF = ITF entry
- JE = Junior exempt
- w/o = Walkover
- r = Retired
- d = Defaulted
- SR = Special ranking

=== Finals ===
Quarterfinals
1/WC	(France) Lucas Pouille	6	1	6
12	(France) Quentin Halys	4	6	3
4	(France) Grégoire Barrère	6	7^{7}
6	(Italy) Gianluca Mager	1	6^{1}
11	(Slovakia) Filip Horanský	6	6
3/WC	(France) Jo-Wilfried Tsonga	4	4
9	(Sweden) Mikael Ymer	7	7
2	(France) Adrian Mannarino	5	5

Semifinals
1/WC	(France) Lucas Pouille	6	6
4	(France) Grégoire Barrère	1	3
11	(Slovakia) Filip Horanský	1	0
9	(Sweden) Mikael Ymer	6	6

Final
1/WC	(France) Lucas Pouille	6	6
9	(Sweden) Mikael Ymer	3	3

=== Top half ===
==== Section 1 ====
First round
ITF	(Egypt) K-M Maamoun	0	3
(Argentina) P Cachin	6	6
(Belgium) Y Mertens	2	2
(France) C Hemery	6	6
WC	(France) M Martineau	6	6
(France) K de Schepper	3	4
(Spain) D Gimeno Traver	2	2
(France) E Benchetrit	6	6

Second round
1/WC	(France) L Pouille	4	6	7^{7}
(Argentina) P Cachin	6	4	6^{1}
(France) C Hemery	4	3
16	(Spain) T Robredo	6	6
12	(France) Q Halys	6	6
WC	(France) M Martineau	3	4
(France) E Benchetrit	3	6	4
7/SE	(Germany) O Otte	6	1	6

Third round
1/WC	(France) L Pouille	6	1	6
16	(Spain) T Robredo	3	6	2
12	(France) Q Halys	7	6
7/SE	(Germany) O Otte	5	1

Quarterfinals
1/WC	(France) L Pouille	6	1	6
12	(France) Q Halys	4	6	3

==== Section 2 ====
First round
(France) J Tatlot	7^{7}	6
(Belgium) S Darcis	6^{3}	3
(Spain) B Zapata Miralles	5	0^{r}
(France) A Escoffier	7	0
ITF	(France) E Furness	1	6^{2}
(Italy) A Bega	6	7^{7}
WC	(France) L Lokoli	7	6
ITF	(Italy) R Brancaccio	5	3

Second round
4	(France) G Barrère	6	7^{7}
(France) J Tatlot	2	6^{4}
(France) A Escoffier	3	6^{4}
15	(Czech Republic) Z Kolář	6	7^{7}
10	(Belgium) K Coppejans	6	2	3
(Italy) A Bega	1	6	6
WC	(France) L Lokoli	6	2	0
6	(Italy) G Mager	4	6	6

Third round
4	(France) G Barrère	6	3	6
15	(Czech Republic) Z Kolář	3	6	3
(Italy) A Bega	3	2
6	(Italy) G Mager	6	6

Quarterfinals
4	(France) G Barrère	6	7^{7}
6	(Italy) G Mager	1	6^{1}

=== Bottom half ===
==== Section 3 ====
First round
ITF	(France) G Jacq	7^{7}	7
Q	(France) A Olivetti	6^{5}	5
(France) T Lamasine	6	6
(Chinese Taipei) C-h Tseng	0	4
(Spain) D Muñoz de la Nava	6^{4}	5
Q	(Monaco) H Nys	7^{7}	7
(Serbia) V Troicki	7^{8}	6
(France) N Mahut	6^{6}	2

Second round
8	(United States) M Giron	6	6
ITF	(France) G Jacq	1	4
(France) T Lamasine	6	6^{4}	4
11	(Slovakia) F Horanský	4	7^{7}	6
13	(Italy) R Marcora	6	4	5
Q	(Monaco) H Nys	4	6	7
(Serbia) V Troicki	1	6^{1}
3/WC	(France) J-W Tsonga	6	7^{7}

Third round
8	(United States) M Giron	5	2
11	(Slovakia) F Horanský	7	6
Q	(Monaco) H Nys	5	3
3/WC	(France) J-W Tsonga	7	6

Quarterfinals
11	(Slovakia) F Horanský	6	6
3/WC	(France) J-W Tsonga	4	4

==== Section 4 ====
First round
(Russia) T Gabashvili	3	4
(Germany) J Lenz	6	6
ITF	(Spain) O Roca Batalla	6	6
(Dominican Republic) J Hernández Fernández	4	2
(Italy) A Pellegrino	2
(United Kingdom) J Choinski	1^{r}
WC	(France) Pierre Delage	3	4
(Italy) GM Moroni	6	6

Second round
5	(France) A Hoang	6^{2}	6	3
(Germany) J Lenz	7^{7}	3	6
ITF	(Spain) O Roca Batalla	5	2
9	(Sweden) M Ymer	7	6
14	(France) M Janvier	6	6
(Italy) A Pellegrino	1	4
(Italy) GM Moroni	4	0
2	(France) A Mannarino	6	6

Third round
(Germany) J Lenz	4	4
9	(Sweden) M Ymer	6	6
14	(France) M Janvier	2	4
2	(France) A Mannarino	6	6

Quarterfinals
9	(Sweden) M Ymer	7	7
2	(France) A Mannarino	5	5
