= 2024 BNP Paribas Primrose Bordeaux – Doubles =

Doubles
- 2024 BNP Paribas Primrose Bordeaux

Final
- Champions: (United Kingdom) Julian Cash (United States) Robert Galloway
- Runners-up: (France) Quentin Halys (France) Nicolas Mahut
- Score: 6–3, 7–6^{(7–2)}

Events
Singles	Doubles
← 2023 ·	BNP Paribas Primrose Bordeaux	· 2025 →

Lloyd Glasspool and Harri Heliövaara were the defending champions but only Glasspool chose to defend his title, partnering Jean-Julien Rojer. They retired from their first round match against Nicolás Barrientos and Francisco Cabral.

Julian Cash and Robert Galloway won the title after defeating Quentin Halys and Nicolas Mahut 6–3, 7–6^{(7–2)} in the final.

== Seeds ==
1. (United Kingdom) Lloyd Glasspool / (Netherlands) Jean-Julien Rojer (first round, retired)
2. (France) Sadio Doumbia / (Australia) John Peers (semifinals)
3. (United Kingdom) Julian Cash / (United States) Robert Galloway (champions)
4. (India) Yuki Bhambri / (France) Albano Olivetti (semifinals)

== Draw ==
=== Key ===
- Q = Qualifier
- WC = Wild card
- LL = Lucky loser
- Alt = Alternate
- SE = Special exempt
- PR = Protected ranking
- ITF = ITF entry
- JE = Junior exempt
- w/o = Walkover
- r = Retired
- d = Defaulted
- SR = Special ranking

=== Draw ===
First round
1	(United Kingdom) L Glasspool (Netherlands) J-J Rojer	0^{r}
(Colombia) N Barrientos (Portugal) F Cabral	3
WC	(France) Q Halys (France) N Mahut	6	7^{8}
(France) G Jacq (Czech Republic) P Nouza	3	6^{6}
4	(India) Y Bhambri (France) A Olivetti	5	6	[10]
(Netherlands) R Haase (Austria) P Oswald	7	3	[5]
WC	(France) M Bourgue (France) H Grenier	2	1
(France) T Arribagé (Romania) V Cornea	6	6
(Netherlands) S Arends (Netherlands) M Middelkoop	7	7^{7}
(United States) E King (Brazil) O Luz	5	6^{4}
(France) J Eysseric (Netherlands) B Stevens	6^{4}	4
3	(United Kingdom) J Cash (United States) R Galloway	7^{7}	6
(United Kingdom) L Johnson (Tunisia) S Mansouri	7^{7}	6
(Sweden) A Göransson (Netherlands) S Verbeek	6^{3}	4
(Australia) R Hijikata (China) J Shang
2	(France) S Doumbia (Australia) J Peers	w/o

Quarterfinals
(Colombia) N Barrientos (Portugal) F Cabral	6	6^{3}	[7]
WC	(France) Q Halys (France) N Mahut	2	7^{7}	[10]
4	(India) Y Bhambri (France) A Olivetti	6	6^{5}	[10]
(France) T Arribagé (Romania) V Cornea	3	7^{7}	[5]
(Netherlands) S Arends (Netherlands) M Middelkoop	6^{2}	6	[11]
3	(United Kingdom) J Cash (United States) R Galloway	7^{7}	1	[13]
(United Kingdom) L Johnson (Tunisia) S Mansouri	7	4	[5]
2	(France) S Doumbia (Australia) J Peers	5	6	[10]

Semifinals
WC	(France) Q Halys (France) N Mahut	6	7^{9}
4	(India) Y Bhambri (France) A Olivetti	4	6^{7}
3	(United Kingdom) J Cash (United States) R Galloway	7	6
2	(France) S Doumbia (Australia) J Peers	5	2

Final
WC	(France) Q Halys (France) N Mahut	3	6^{2}
3	(United Kingdom) J Cash (United States) R Galloway	6	7^{7}
