= 2023 BNP Paribas Primrose Bordeaux – Doubles =

Doubles
- 2023 BNP Paribas Primrose Bordeaux

Final
- Champions: (United Kingdom) Lloyd Glasspool (Finland) Harri Heliövaara
- Runners-up: (France) Sadio Doumbia (France) Fabien Reboul
- Score: 6–4, 6–2

Events
Singles	Doubles
← 2022 ·	BNP Paribas Primrose Bordeaux	· 2024 →

Rafael Matos and David Vega Hernández were the defending champions but chose to defend their title with different partners. Matos partnered Francisco Cabral but lost in the semifinals to Sadio Doumbia and Fabien Reboul. Vega Hernández partnered Diego Hidalgo but lost in the first round to Patrik Niklas-Salminen and Bart Stevens.

Lloyd Glasspool and Harri Heliövaara won the title after defeating Doumbia and Reboul 6–4, 6–2 in the final.

== Seeds ==
1. (United Kingdom) Lloyd Glasspool / (Finland) Harri Heliövaara (champions)
2. (Portugal) Francisco Cabral / (Brazil) Rafael Matos (semifinals)
3. (France) Sadio Doumbia / (France) Fabien Reboul (final)
4. (Sweden) André Göransson / (Japan) Ben McLachlan (first round)

== Draw ==
=== Key ===
- Q = Qualifier
- WC = Wild card
- LL = Lucky loser
- Alt = Alternate
- SE = Special exempt
- PR = Protected ranking
- ITF = ITF entry
- JE = Junior exempt
- w/o = Walkover
- r = Retired
- d = Defaulted
- SR = Special ranking

First round
1	(United Kingdom) L Glasspool (Finland) H Heliövaara	6	5	[10]
(Germany) C Frantzen (Germany) H Jebens	3	7	[2]
(France) J Chardy (France) A Olivetti	7^{7}	1	[11]
WC	(France) A Cazaux (France) H Mayot	6^{2}	6	[9]
4	(Sweden) A Göransson (Japan) B McLachlan	4	4
PR	(France) P-H Herbert (France) N Mahut	6	6
WC	(France) M Bourgue (France) K Jacquet	4	3
(Argentina) G Andreozzi (Argentina) G Durán	6	6
(Finland) P Niklas-Salminen (Netherlands) B Stevens	7	6
(Ecuador) D Hidalgo (Spain) D Vega Hernández	5	3
(United States) R Galloway (Mexico) MÁ Reyes-Varela	6^{3}	3
3	(France) S Doumbia (France) F Reboul	7^{7}	6
(Belgium) M Geerts (United Kingdom) R Peniston	7^{10}	6
(France) J Eysseric (Pakistan) A-u-H Qureshi	6^{8}	2
(India) Y Bhambri (India) S Myneni	4	6^{3}
2	(Portugal) F Cabral (Brazil) R Matos	6	7^{7}

Quarterfinals
1	(United Kingdom) L Glasspool (Finland) H Heliövaara	7	6
(France) J Chardy (France) A Olivetti	5	4
PR	(France) P-H Herbert (France) N Mahut	6^{7}	6	[10]
(Argentina) G Andreozzi (Argentina) G Durán	7^{9}	4	[7]
(Finland) P Niklas-Salminen (Netherlands) B Stevens	2	1
3	(France) S Doumbia (France) F Reboul	6	6
(Belgium) M Geerts (United Kingdom) R Peniston	2	5
2	(Portugal) F Cabral (Brazil) R Matos	6	7

Semifinals
1	(United Kingdom) L Glasspool (Finland) H Heliövaara	7	6
PR	(France) P-H Herbert (France) N Mahut	5	3
3	(France) S Doumbia (France) F Reboul	6	6
2	(Portugal) F Cabral (Brazil) R Matos	3	4

Final
1	(United Kingdom) L Glasspool (Finland) H Heliövaara	6	6
3	(France) S Doumbia (France) F Reboul	4	2
