= 2016 BNP Paribas Primrose Bordeaux – Singles =

Singles
- 2016 BNP Paribas Primrose Bordeaux

Final
- Champion: (Brazil) Rogério Dutra Silva
- Runner-up: (United States) Bjorn Fratangelo
- Score: 6–3, 6–1

Events
Singles	Doubles
← 2015 ·	BNP Paribas Primrose Bordeaux	· 2017 →

Thanasi Kokkinakis was the defending champion but chose not to participate.

Rogério Dutra Silva won the title after defeating Bjorn Fratangelo 6–3, 6–1 in the final.

== Seeds ==
1. (Argentina) Diego Schwartzman (first round)
2. (Czech Republic) Lukáš Rosol (first round)
3. (France) Adrian Mannarino (first round)
4. (Japan) Taro Daniel (first round)
5. (Australia) Jordan Thompson (first round)
6. (Portugal) Gastão Elias (second round)
7. (Brazil) Rogério Dutra Silva (champion)
8. (Netherlands) Thiemo de Bakker (first round)

== Draw ==
=== Key ===
- Q = Qualifier
- WC = Wild card
- LL = Lucky loser
- Alt = Alternate
- ITF = ITF entry
- PR = Protected ranking
- SR = Special ranking
- SE = Special exempt
- JE = Junior exempt
- JR = Junior Accelerator Programme entrant
- CO = College Accelerator Programme entrant
- NG = Next Gen Accelerator Program entrant
- w/o = Walkover
- r = Retired
- d = Defaulted

=== Finals ===
Semifinals
(United States) Bjorn Fratangelo	7^{7}	6
(Argentina) Máximo González	6^{5}	1
7	(Brazil) Rogério Dutra Silva	4	6	6
(Sweden) Elias Ymer	6	1	3

Final
(United States) Bjorn Fratangelo	3	1
7	(Brazil) Rogério Dutra Silva	6	6

=== Top half ===
First round
1	(Argentina) D Schwartzman	7^{7}	4	1
WC	(France) M Bourgue	6^{5}	6	6
(United Kingdom) J Ward	7^{8}	4	2
(Belgium) S Darcis	6^{6}	6	6
(United States) T Smyczek	2	3
Alt	(France) Q Halys	6	6
(United States) B Fratangelo	6	6
5	(Australia) J Thompson	4	3
3	(France) A Mannarino	3	6	3
SE	(Brazil) T Monteiro	6	1	6
(Argentina) M González	6	6
(Estonia) J Zopp	3	2
WC	(France) M Janvier	3	2
(Brazil) A Ghem	6	6
(United States) J Donaldson	6	6
8	(Netherlands) T de Bakker	2	4

Second round
WC	(France) M Bourgue	6	3	4
(Belgium) S Darcis	3	6	6
Alt	(France) Q Halys	6^{8}	6	4
(United States) B Fratangelo	7^{10}	3	6
SE	(Brazil) T Monteiro	3	7^{7}	3
(Argentina) M González	6	6^{2}	6
(Brazil) A Ghem	6	6
(United States) J Donaldson	3	4

Quarterfinals
(Belgium) S Darcis	6	2	6^{3}
(United States) B Fratangelo	4	6	7^{7}
(Argentina) M González	4	6	6
(Brazil) A Ghem	6	1	4

Semifinals
(United States) B Fratangelo	7^{7}	6
(Argentina) M González	6^{5}	1

=== Bottom half ===
First round
7	(Brazil) R Dutra Silva	6	6
WC	(France) T Lamasine	1	2
(Colombia) A Falla	6	6
Q	(France) C Hemery	2	0
(Spain) D Gimeno-Traver	5	6	6
Q	(United States) T Paul	7	3	3
Q	(Russia) D Medvedev	7^{7}	6
4	(Japan) T Daniel	6^{5}	2
6	(Portugal) G Elias	4	6	6
(United States) D Novikov	6	3	1
Q	(France) J Eysseric	7^{7}	7
(Serbia) P Krstin	6^{5}	5
(Spain) R Carballés Baena	6	2	6
WC	(France) C Lestienne	1	6	1
(Sweden) E Ymer	6	6
2	(Czech Republic) L Rosol	4	4

Second round
7	(Brazil) R Dutra Silva	6	6
(Colombia) A Falla	1	2
(Spain) D Gimeno-Traver	4	2
Q	(Russia) D Medvedev	6	6
6	(Portugal) G Elias	4	6	6^{5}
Q	(France) J Eysseric	6	3	7^{7}
(Spain) R Carballés Baena	6	6^{5}	6^{7}
(Sweden) E Ymer	1	7^{7}	7^{9}

Quarterfinals
7	(Brazil) R Dutra Silva	6	7^{7}
Q	(Russia) D Medvedev	4	6^{3}
Q	(France) J Eysseric	4	5
(Sweden) E Ymer	6	7

Semifinals
7	(Brazil) R Dutra Silva	4	6	6
(Sweden) E Ymer	6	1	3
