= 2018 BNP Paribas Primrose Bordeaux – Doubles =

Doubles
- 2018 BNP Paribas Primrose Bordeaux

Final
- Champions: (United States) Bradley Klahn (Canada) Peter Polansky
- Runners-up: (Argentina) Guillermo Durán (Argentina) Máximo González
- Score: 6–3, 3–6, [10–7]

Events
Singles	Doubles
← 2017 ·	BNP Paribas Primrose Bordeaux	· 2019 →

Purav Raja and Divij Sharan were the defending champions but only Raja chose to defend his title, partnering Fabrice Martin. Raja lost in the quarterfinals to Guillermo Durán and Máximo González.

Bradley Klahn and Peter Polansky won the title after defeating Durán and González 6–3, 3–6, [10–7] in the final.

== Seeds ==
1. (Netherlands) Wesley Koolhof / (New Zealand) Artem Sitak (first round)
2. (France) Fabrice Martin / (India) Purav Raja (quarterfinals)
3. (United States) James Cerretani / (United States) Nicholas Monroe (semifinals)
4. (Sweden) Robert Lindstedt / (Belarus) Andrei Vasilevski (quarterfinals)

== Draw ==
=== Key ===
- Q = Qualifier
- WC = Wild card
- LL = Lucky loser
- Alt = Alternate
- SE = Special exempt
- PR = Protected ranking
- ITF = ITF entry
- JE = Junior exempt
- w/o = Walkover
- r = Retired
- d = Defaulted
- SR = Special ranking

First round
1	(Netherlands) W Koolhof (New Zealand) A Sitak	5	1
(Moldova) R Albot (United States) S Kozlov	7	6
(United States) B Klahn (Canada) P Polansky	6	6
WC	(France) B Bonzi (France) G Jacq	3	4
4	(Sweden) R Lindstedt (Belarus) A Vasilevski	7^{7}	6
WC	(France) M Bourgue (France) K de Schepper	6^{1}	4
(France) J Eysseric (Ukraine) S Stakhovsky	5	4
(Argentina) C Berlocq (Australia) T Kokkinakis	7	6
(Argentina) G Andreozzi (Uruguay) A Behar	1	2
WC	(France) G Blancaneaux (France) C Lestienne	6	6
(Monaco) R Arneodo (France) H Nys	6	4	[8]
3	(United States) J Cerretani (United States) N Monroe	2	6	[10]
(Argentina) G Durán (Argentina) M González	7^{7}	7
(France) G Barrère (France) N Mahut	6^{3}	5
(Chile) H Podlipnik-Castillo (United States) J Withrow	5	0
2	(France) F Martin (India) P Raja	7	6

Quarterfinals
(Moldova) R Albot (United States) S Kozlov	2	4
(United States) B Klahn (Canada) P Polansky	6	6
4	(Sweden) R Lindstedt (Belarus) A Vasilevski	3	6^{5}
(Argentina) C Berlocq (Australia) T Kokkinakis	6	7^{7}
WC	(France) G Blancaneaux (France) C Lestienne	4	6	[8]
3	(United States) J Cerretani (United States) N Monroe	6	4	[10]
(Argentina) G Durán (Argentina) M González	6	7
2	(France) F Martin (India) P Raja	3	5

Semifinals
(United States) B Klahn (Canada) P Polansky	w/o
(Argentina) C Berlocq (Australia) T Kokkinakis
3	(United States) J Cerretani (United States) N Monroe	1	4
(Argentina) G Durán (Argentina) M González	6	6

Final
(United States) B Klahn (Canada) P Polansky	6	3	[10]
(Argentina) G Durán (Argentina) M González	3	6	[7]
