= 2017 BNP Paribas Primrose Bordeaux – Singles =

Singles
- 2017 BNP Paribas Primrose Bordeaux

Final
- Champion: (Belgium) Steve Darcis
- Runner-up: (Brazil) Rogério Dutra Silva
- Score: 7–6^{(7–2)}, 4–6, 7–5

Events
Singles	Doubles
← 2016 ·	BNP Paribas Primrose Bordeaux	· 2018 →

Rogério Dutra Silva was the defending champion but lost to Steve Darcis 6–7^{(2–7)}, 6–4, 5–7 in the final.

== Seeds ==
1. (Belgium) Steve Darcis (champion)
2. (Tunisia) Malek Jaziri (first round)
3. (France) Jérémy Chardy (second round)
4. (Brazil) Rogério Dutra Silva (final)
5. (Serbia) Dušan Lajović (quarterfinals)
6. (United States) Frances Tiafoe (first round, retired)
7. (Argentina) Facundo Bagnis (second round, retired)
8. (Portugal) Gastão Elias (first round)

== Draw ==
=== Key ===
- Q = Qualifier
- WC = Wild card
- LL = Lucky loser
- Alt = Alternate
- SE = Special exempt
- PR = Protected ranking
- ITF = ITF entry
- JE = Junior exempt
- w/o = Walkover
- r = Retired
- d = Defaulted
- SR = Special ranking

=== Finals ===
Semifinals
1	(Belgium) Steve Darcis	5	6	7^{7}
(Belgium) Arthur De Greef	7	1	6^{2}
4	(Brazil) Rogério Dutra Silva	6	7^{7}
Q	(France) Benjamin Bonzi	2	6^{3}

Final
1	(Belgium) Steve Darcis	7^{7}	4	7
4	(Brazil) Rogério Dutra Silva	6^{2}	6	5

=== Top half ===
First round
1	(Belgium) S Darcis	6^{5}	6	6
WC	(France) L Lokoli	7^{7}	3	3
WC	(France) G Blancaneaux	2	2
(Argentina) M González	6	6
SE	(Portugal) P Sousa	6	6
WC	(France) G Sakharov	4	4
Q	(France) M Janvier	2
6	(United States) F Tiafoe	1^{r}
3	(France) J Chardy	7^{8}	6^{0}	6
(United States) R Opelka	6^{6}	7^{7}	4
(Spain) R Carballés Baena	4	1
(United States) B Fratangelo	6	6
(France) V Millot	3	1
(Belgium) A De Greef	6	6
Q	(United States) M McDonald	4	1
7	(Argentina) F Bagnis	6	6

Second round
1	(Belgium) S Darcis	6	6
(Argentina) M González	2	3
SE	(Portugal) P Sousa	7^{7}	4	2
Q	(France) M Janvier	6^{2}	6	6
3	(France) J Chardy	6	3	6^{5}
(United States) B Fratangelo	3	6	7^{7}
(Belgium) A De Greef	7^{7}	0
7	(Argentina) F Bagnis	6^{5}	0^{r}

Quarterfinals
1	(Belgium) S Darcis	6	6
Q	(France) M Janvier	1	3
(United States) B Fratangelo	6^{2}	4
(Belgium) A De Greef	7^{7}	6

Semifinals
1	(Belgium) S Darcis	5	6	7^{7}
(Belgium) A De Greef	7	1	6^{2}

=== Bottom half ===
First round
8	(Portugal) G Elias	4	1
(France) J Benneteau	6	6
(United States) D Kudla	3	2
(Czech Republic) L Rosol	6	6
(France) K de Schepper	6	6
(France) M Bourgue	3	2
(Sweden) E Ymer	3	3
4	(Brazil) R Dutra Silva	6	6
5	(Serbia) D Lajović	6	6
(Brazil) J Souza	3	4
(France) Q Halys	6	4	7
Q	(United States) T Paul	4	6	5
Q	(France) B Bonzi	7	6
(Canada) P Polansky	5	3
WC	(France) C Moutet	4	6	6
2	(Tunisia) M Jaziri	6	4	3

Second round
(France) J Benneteau	7^{7}	3	7^{7}
(Czech Republic) L Rosol	6^{4}	6	6^{3}
(France) K de Schepper	4	2
4	(Brazil) R Dutra Silva	6	6
5	(Serbia) D Lajović	6	6^{2}	6
(France) Q Halys	4	7^{7}	3
Q	(France) B Bonzi	6	7
WC	(France) C Moutet	3	5

Quarterfinals
(France) J Benneteau	0	0^{r}
4	(Brazil) R Dutra Silva	6	2
5	(Serbia) D Lajović	1	1
Q	(France) B Bonzi	6	6

Semifinals
4	(Brazil) R Dutra Silva	6	7^{7}
Q	(France) B Bonzi	2	6^{3}
