= 2023 BNP Paribas Primrose Bordeaux – Singles =

Singles
- 2023 BNP Paribas Primrose Bordeaux

Final
- Champion: (France) Ugo Humbert
- Runner-up: (Argentina) Tomás Martín Etcheverry
- Score: 7–6^{(7–3)}, 6–4

Events
Singles	Doubles
- BNP Paribas Primrose Bordeaux

Alexei Popyrin was the defending champion but chose not to defend his title.

Ugo Humbert won the title after defeating Tomás Martín Etcheverry 7–6^{(7–3)}, 6–4 in the final.

== Seeds ==
The top four seeds received a bye into the second round.

1. (Germany) Jan-Lennard Struff (semifinals)
2. (United Kingdom) Andy Murray (second round)
3. (France) Richard Gasquet (semifinals)
4. (France) Adrian Mannarino (second round)
5. (France) Ugo Humbert (champion)
6. (Sweden) Mikael Ymer (quarterfinals)
7. (Argentina) Tomás Martín Etcheverry (final)
8. (France) Corentin Moutet (quarterfinals)

== Draw ==
Key

- Q = Qualifier
- WC = Wild card
- LL = Lucky loser
- Alt = Alternate
- ITF = ITF entry
- PR = Protected ranking
- SR = Special ranking
- SE = Special exempt
- JE = Junior exempt
- JR = Junior Accelerator Programme entrant
- CO = College Accelerator Programme entrant
- NG = Next Gen Accelerator Program entrant
- w/o = Walkover
- r = Retired
- d = Defaulted

=== Finals ===
Semifinals
1	(Germany) Jan-Lennard Struff	4	2
7	(Argentina) Tomás Martín Etcheverry	6	6
3	(France) Richard Gasquet	0	2
5	(France) Ugo Humbert	6	6

Final
7	(Argentina) Tomás Martín Etcheverry	6^{3}	4
5	(France) Ugo Humbert	7^{7}	6

=== Top half ===
First round
WC	(France) M Bourgue	4	5
Q	(France) K Jacquet	6	7
SE	(France) B Paire	6	4	3
Alt	(Austria) D Thiem	4	6	6
LL	(Belgium) M Geerts	1	6	3
8	(France) C Moutet	6	1	6
Q	(Morocco) E Benchetrit	6	3	2
(Spain) A Ramos Viñolas	4	6	6
WC	(France) A Cazaux	6	6
(France) A Rinderknech	2	3
I Ivashka	5	3
7	(Argentina) TM Etcheverry	7	6

Second round
1	(Germany) J-L Struff	6	6
Q	(France) K Jacquet	3	3
Alt	(Austria) D Thiem	6^{5}	1
8	(France) C Moutet	7^{7}	6
4	(France) A Mannarino	6	4	5
(Spain) A Ramos Viñolas	3	6	7
WC	(France) A Cazaux	6^{0}	5
7	(Argentina) TM Etcheverry	7^{7}	7

Quarterfinals
1	(Germany) J-L Struff	6	6
8	(France) C Moutet	3	2
(Spain) A Ramos Viñolas	3	3
7	(Argentina) TM Etcheverry	6	6

Semifinals
1	(Germany) J-L Struff	4	2
7	(Argentina) TM Etcheverry	6	6

=== Bottom half ===
First round
6	(Sweden) M Ymer	2	6	7
SE	(Serbia) H Međedović	6	3	5
WC	(France) H Mayot	2	6	3
(France) L Van Assche	6	4	6
Alt	(United Kingdom) R Peniston	5	4
Alt	(Australia) T Kokkinakis	7	6
5	(France) U Humbert	6	6
Alt	(France) A Fils	2	4
Q	(Belgium) G Onclin	6	6
Alt	(Sweden) E Ymer	1	4
(Switzerland) S Wawrinka	6	6
Q	(France) U Blanchet	3	1

Second round
6	(Sweden) M Ymer	6	3	6
(France) L Van Assche	3	6	4
Alt	(Australia) T Kokkinakis	6	6^{5}	5
3	(France) R Gasquet	1	7^{7}	7
5	(France) U Humbert	6	6^{6}	7
Q	(Belgium) G Onclin	3	7^{8}	5
(Switzerland) S Wawrinka	6	6
2	(United Kingdom) A Murray	3	0

Quarterfinals
6	(Sweden) M Ymer	6^{14}	3
3	(France) R Gasquet	7^{16}	6
5	(France) U Humbert	7	6
(Switzerland) S Wawrinka	5	1

Semifinals
3	(France) R Gasquet	0	2
5	(France) U Humbert	6	6
