= 2015 BNP Paribas Primrose Bordeaux – Singles =

Singles
- 2015 BNP Paribas Primrose Bordeaux

Final
- Champion: (Australia) Thanasi Kokkinakis
- Runner-up: (Netherlands) Thiemo de Bakker
- Score: 6–4, 1–6, 7–6^{(7–5)}

Events
Singles	Doubles
← 2014 ·	BNP Paribas Primrose Bordeaux	· 2016 →

Julien Benneteau was the defending champion, but he did not participate this year.

Qualifier Thanasi Kokkinakis won the title, defeating Thiemo de Bakker in the final, 6–4, 1–6, 7–6^{(7–5)}.

== Seeds ==
1. (Ukraine) Sergiy Stakhovsky (second round)
2. (Australia) Sam Groth (first round)
3. (Australia) James Duckworth (second round)
4. (Netherlands) Robin Haase (second round)
5. (France) Lucas Pouille (quarterfinals)
6. (Serbia) Filip Krajinović (second round)
7. (Slovakia) Norbert Gombos (quarterfinals)
8. (Argentina) Máximo González (first round)

== Draw ==
=== Key ===
- Q = Qualifier
- WC = Wild card
- LL = Lucky loser
- Alt = Alternate
- SE = Special exempt
- PR = Protected ranking
- ITF = ITF entry
- JE = Junior exempt
- w/o = Walkover
- r = Retired
- d = Defaulted
- SR = Special ranking

=== Finals ===
Semifinals
Q	(France) Jonathan Eysseric	4	4
(Netherlands) Thiemo de Bakker	6	6
(Estonia) Jürgen Zopp	4	5
Q	(Australia) Thanasi Kokkinakis	6	7

Final
(Netherlands) Thiemo de Bakker	4	6	6^{5}
Q	(Australia) Thanasi Kokkinakis	6	1	7^{7}

=== Top half ===
First round
1	(Ukraine) S Stakhovsky	6	6
(Spain) A Montañés	1	2
Q	(France) J Eysseric	6	3	6
Q	(France) M Bourgue	4	6	1
(Romania) V Hănescu	7^{14}	7^{7}
(France) P-H Herbert	6^{12}	6^{5}
(India) S Devvarman	3	6	4
7	(Slovakia) N Gombos	6	4	6
4	(Netherlands) R Haase	6	6
WC	(France) C Moutet	2	2
(Netherlands) T de Bakker	6	3	6
(France) K de Schepper	2	6	3
Q	(France) G Rufin	4	4
(United States) J Donaldson	6	6
(Argentina) F Argüello	6	2	2
5	(France) L Pouille	4	6	6

Second round
1	(Ukraine) S Stakhovsky	6^{7}	0
Q	(France) J Eysseric	7^{9}	6
(Romania) V Hănescu	4	6	3
7	(Slovakia) N Gombos	6	3	6
4	(Netherlands) R Haase	6	6^{3}	4
(Netherlands) T de Bakker	4	7^{7}	6
(United States) J Donaldson	1	4
5	(France) L Pouille	6	6

Quarterfinals
Q	(France) J Eysseric	6	6
7	(Slovakia) N Gombos	0	4
(Netherlands) T de Bakker	6	6
5	(France) L Pouille	1	2

Semifinals
Q	(France) J Eysseric	4	4
(Netherlands) T de Bakker	6	6

=== Bottom half ===
First round
6	(Serbia) F Krajinović	6	7^{7}
(Portugal) G Elias	4	6^{2}
(France) N Mahut	5	6	2
(Brazil) A Ghem	7	3	6
(Estonia) J Zopp	7	7^{7}
LL	(Italy) M Viola	5	6^{5}
WC	(France) Q Halys	4	7^{7}	3
3/Alt	(Australia) J Duckworth	6	6^{5}	6
8	(Argentina) M González	7	3	3
LL	(Spain) R Carballés Baena	5	6	6
(France) P-H Mathieu	7^{7}	3	6
(Belgium) N Desein	6^{4}	6	3
(Georgia (country)) N Basilashvili	4	0^{r}
Q	(Australia) T Kokkinakis	6	3
(Belgium) K Coppejans	7^{7}	6
2	(Australia) S Groth	6^{5}	3

Second round
6	(Serbia) F Krajinović	4	7^{7}	4
(Brazil) A Ghem	6	6^{5}	6
(Estonia) J Zopp	6	6^{2}	6
3/Alt	(Australia) J Duckworth	2	7^{7}	4
LL	(Spain) R Carballés Baena	5
(France) P-H Mathieu	5^{r}
Q	(Australia) T Kokkinakis	6	6
(Belgium) K Coppejans	3	3

Quarterfinals
(Brazil) A Ghem	3	7^{11}	1
(Estonia) J Zopp	6	6^{9}	6
LL	(Spain) R Carballés Baena	6	3	5
Q	(Australia) T Kokkinakis	4	6	7

Semifinals
(Estonia) J Zopp	4	5
Q	(Australia) T Kokkinakis	6	7
