= 2022 BNP Paribas Primrose Bordeaux =

- Date: 9 – 15 May
- Edition: 13th
- Surface: Clay
- Location: Bordeaux, France

Champions

Singles
- (Australia) Alexei Popyrin

Doubles
- (Brazil) Rafael Matos / (Spain) David Vega Hernández
← 2019 ·	BNP Paribas Primrose Bordeaux	· 2023 →

The 2022 BNP Paribas Primrose Bordeaux was a professional tennis tournament played on clay courts. It was the 13th edition of the tournament and part of the 2022 ATP Challenger Tour. It took place in Bordeaux, France between 9 and 15 May 2022.

== Singles main-draw entrants ==
=== Seeds ===
Country	Player	Rank^{1}	Seed
FRA	Hugo Gaston	68	1
FRA	Benjamin Bonzi	70	2
FRA	Richard Gasquet	76	3
ESP	Carlos Taberner	89	4
ESP	Jaume Munar	98	5
FRA	Quentin Halys	101	6
BRA	Thiago Monteiro	103	7
~~PER~~	~~Juan Pablo Varillas~~	~~104~~	~~8~~

- ^{1} Rankings are as of 2 May 2022.

=== Other entrants ===
The following players received wildcards into the singles main draw:

- (France) Arthur Fils
- (France) Hugo Grenier
- (France) Lucas Pouille

The following players received entry into the singles main draw as special exempts:

- (France) Grégoire Barrère
- Pavel Kotov

The following players received entry from the qualifying draw:

- (Morocco) Elliot Benchetrit
- (Uruguay) Martín Cuevas
- (France) Calvin Hemery
- (Brazil) João Menezes
- (Italy) Andrea Pellegrino
- (Portugal) Pedro Sousa

The following players received entry as lucky losers:

- (Belgium) Kimmer Coppejans
- (India) Ramkumar Ramanathan

== Champions ==
=== Singles ===
- (Australia) Alexei Popyrin def. (France) Quentin Halys 2–6, 7–6^{(7–5)}, 7–6^{(7–4)}.

=== Doubles ===
- (Brazil) Rafael Matos / (Spain) David Vega Hernández def. (Monaco) Hugo Nys / (Poland) Jan Zieliński 6–4, 6–0.
