= 2019 BNP Paribas Primrose Bordeaux – Doubles =

Doubles
- 2019 BNP Paribas Primrose Bordeaux

Final
- Champions: (France) Grégoire Barrère (France) Quentin Halys
- Runners-up: (Monaco) Romain Arneodo (Monaco) Hugo Nys
- Score: 6–4, 6–1

Events
Singles	Doubles
← 2018 ·	BNP Paribas Primrose Bordeaux	· 2022 →

Bradley Klahn and Peter Polansky were the defending champions but chose not to defend their title.

Grégoire Barrère and Quentin Halys won the title after defeating Romain Arneodo and Hugo Nys 6–4, 6–1 in the final.

== Seeds ==
1. (France) Nicolas Mahut / (Austria) Jürgen Melzer (quarterfinals, retired)
2. (United States) James Cerretani / (United States) Nicholas Monroe (quarterfinals)
3. (China) Gong Maoxin / (China) Zhang Ze (semifinals)
4. (Belgium) Sander Gillé / (Spain) David Vega Hernández (quarterfinals)

== Draw ==
=== Key ===
- Q = Qualifier
- WC = Wild card
- LL = Lucky loser
- Alt = Alternate
- SE = Special exempt
- PR = Protected ranking
- ITF = ITF entry
- JE = Junior exempt
- w/o = Walkover
- r = Retired
- d = Defaulted
- SR = Special ranking

First round
1	(France) N Mahut (Austria) J Melzer	6^{4}	6	[10]
(Italy) G Mager (Italy) A Pellegrino	7^{7}	4	[8]
WC	(France) E Benchetrit (France) T Lamasine	6	6
(Spain) D Gimeno Traver (Spain) D Marrero	3	2
4	(Belgium) S Gillé (Spain) D Vega Hernández	6	6
WC	(France) G Jacq (France) A Olivetti	4	2
(Monaco) R Arneodo (Monaco) H Nys	6	7^{7}
(France) J Eysseric (Croatia) A Šančić	3	6^{3}
(Sweden) E Ymer (Sweden) M Ymer	2	6	[10]
ITF	(Italy) R Brancaccio (Egypt) K-M Maamoun	6	3	[6]
ITF	(Spain) S Martos Gornés (Spain) O Roca Batalla	3	7^{7}	[6]
3	(China) M Gong (China) Ze Zhang	6	6^{4}	[10]
(Belgium) K Coppejans (Czech Republic) Z Kolář	6^{6}	4
(France) G Barrère (France) Q Halys	7^{8}	6
WC	(France) Joffrey de Schepper (France) K de Schepper	2	3
2	(United States) J Cerretani (United States) N Monroe	6	6

Quarterfinals
1	(France) N Mahut (Austria) J Melzer	6^{3}	2
WC	(France) E Benchetrit (France) T Lamasine	7^{7}	1^{r}
4	(Belgium) S Gillé (Spain) D Vega Hernández	6^{2}	6	[4]
(Monaco) R Arneodo (Monaco) H Nys	7^{7}	4	[10]
(Sweden) E Ymer (Sweden) M Ymer	2	4
3	(China) M Gong (China) Ze Zhang	6	6
(France) G Barrère (France) Q Halys	7	6
2	(United States) J Cerretani (United States) N Monroe	5	4

Semifinals
WC	(France) E Benchetrit (France) T Lamasine	3	1
(Monaco) R Arneodo (Monaco) H Nys	6	6
3	(China) M Gong (China) Ze Zhang	4	3
(France) G Barrère (France) Q Halys	6	6

Final
(Monaco) R Arneodo (Monaco) H Nys	4	1
(France) G Barrère (France) Q Halys	6	6
