= 2017 BNP Paribas Primrose Bordeaux =

- Date: 15–21 May
- Edition: 10th
- Surface: Clay
- Location: Bordeaux, France

Champions

Singles
- (Belgium) Steve Darcis

Doubles
- (India) Purav Raja / (India) Divij Sharan
← 2016 ·	BNP Paribas Primrose Bordeaux	· 2018 →

The 2017 BNP Paribas Primrose Bordeaux was a professional tennis tournament played on clay courts. It was the tenth edition of the tournament which was part of the 2017 ATP Challenger Tour. It took place in Bordeaux, France between 15 and 21 May 2017.

== Singles main-draw entrants ==
=== Seeds ===
Country	Player	Rank^{1}	Seed
BEL	Steve Darcis	43	1
TUN	Malek Jaziri	69	2
FRA	Jérémy Chardy	70	3
BRA	Rogério Dutra Silva	71	4
SRB	Dušan Lajović	77	5
USA	Frances Tiafoe	79	6
ARG	Facundo Bagnis	97	7
POR	Gastão Elias	99	8

- ^{1} Rankings are as of May 8, 2017.

=== Other entrants ===
The following players received wildcards into the singles main draw:

- (France) Geoffrey Blancaneaux
- (France) Laurent Lokoli
- (France) Corentin Moutet
- (France) Gleb Sakharov

The following player received entry into the singles main draw as a special exempt:

- (Portugal) Pedro Sousa

The following players received entry from the qualifying draw:

- (France) Benjamin Bonzi
- (France) Maxime Janvier
- (United States) Mackenzie McDonald
- (United States) Tommy Paul

== Champions ==
=== Singles ===
- (Belgium) Steve Darcis def. (Brazil) Rogério Dutra Silva 7–6^{(7–2)}, 4–6, 7–5.

=== Doubles ===
- (India) Purav Raja / (India) Divij Sharan def. (Mexico) Santiago González / (New Zealand) Artem Sitak 6–4, 6–4.
