= 2016 BNP Paribas Primrose Bordeaux =

- Date: 9–15 May
- Edition: 9th
- Surface: Clay
- Location: Bordeaux, France

Champions

Singles
- (Brazil) Rogério Dutra Silva

Doubles
- (Sweden) Johan Brunström / (Sweden) Andreas Siljeström
| ← 2015 · | BNP Paribas Primrose Bordeaux | · 2017 → |

The 2016 BNP Paribas Primrose Bordeaux was a professional tennis tournament played on clay courts. It was the ninth edition of the tournament which was part of the 2016 ATP Challenger Tour. It took place in Bordeaux, France between 9 and 15 May 2016.

== Singles main-draw entrants ==
=== Seeds ===
| Country | Player | Rank^{1} | Seed |
|---|---|---|---|
| ARG | Diego Schwartzman | 62 | 1 |
| CZE | Lukáš Rosol | 72 | 2 |
| FRA | Adrian Mannarino | 80 | 3 |
| JPN | Taro Daniel | 89 | 4 |
| AUS | Jordan Thompson | 90 | 5 |
| POR | Gastão Elias | 93 | 6 |
| BRA | Rogério Dutra Silva | 96 | 7 |
| NED | Thiemo de Bakker | 99 | 8 |

- ^{1} Rankings are as of May 2, 2016.

=== Other entrants ===
The following players received wildcards into the singles main draw:

- (France) Mathias Bourgue
- (France) Maxime Janvier
- (France) Tristan Lamasine
- (France) Constant Lestienne

The following player received entry as a special exempt into the singles main draw:

- (Brazil) Thiago Monteiro

The following player received entry as an alternate into the singles main draw:

- (France) Quentin Halys

The following players received entry from the qualifying draw:

- (France) Jonathan Eysseric
- (France) Calvin Hemery
- (Russia) Daniil Medvedev
- (United States) Tommy Paul

== Champions ==
=== Singles ===
- (Brazil) Rogério Dutra Silva def. (United States) Bjorn Fratangelo, 6–3, 6–1

=== Doubles ===
- (Sweden) Johan Brunström / (Sweden) Andreas Siljeström def. (Argentina) Guillermo Durán / (Argentina) Máximo González, 6–1, 3–6, [10–4]
