= 2015 BNP Paribas Primrose Bordeaux =

- Date: 11–17 May
- Edition: 8th
- Draw: 32S / 16D
- Prize money: €85,000+H
- Surface: Clay
- Location: Bordeaux, France

Champions

Singles
- (Australia) Thanasi Kokkinakis

Doubles
- (Netherlands) Thiemo de Bakker / (Netherlands) Robin Haase
← 2014 ·	BNP Paribas Primrose Bordeaux	· 2016 →

The 2015 BNP Paribas Primrose Bordeaux was a professional tennis tournament played on clay courts. It was the eighth edition of the tournament which was part of the 2015 ATP Challenger Tour. It took place in Bordeaux, France between 11 and 17 May 2015.

== Singles main-draw entrants ==
=== Seeds ===
Country	Player	Rank^{1}	Seed
UKR	Sergiy Stakhovsky	52	1
AUS	Sam Groth	68	2
AUS	James Duckworth	82	3
NED	Robin Haase	90	4
NED	Lucas Pouille	92	5
SRB	Filip Krajinović	101	6
SVK	Norbert Gombos	109	7
ARG	Máximo González	111	8

- ^{1} Rankings are as of May 4, 2015.

=== Other entrants ===
The following players received wildcards into the singles main draw:

- (France) Quentin Halys
- (France) Corentin Moutet
- (France) Lucas Pouille

The following players received entry into the singles main draw as alternate:

- (Australia) James Duckworth

The following players received entry from the qualifying draw:

- (France) Mathias Bourgue
- (France) Jonathan Eysseric
- (Australia) Thanasi Kokkinakis
- (France) Guillaume Rufin

The following players entered as lucky losers:

- (Spain) Roberto Carballés Baena
- (Italy) Matteo Viola

== Doubles main-draw entrants ==
=== Seeds ===
Country	Player	Country	Player	Rank^{1}	Seed
FRA	Pierre-Hugues Herbert	FRA	Nicolas Mahut	59	1
USA	Nicholas Monroe	NZL	Artem Sitak	106	2
SWE	Johan Brunström	ISR	Jonathan Erlich	155	3
ARG	Máximo González	ARG	Andrés Molteni	180	4

- ^{1} Rankings are as of May 4, 2015.

=== Other entrants ===
The following pairs received wildcards into the doubles main draw:

- (France) Adrien Puget / (France) Laurent Rochette
- (France) Florent Serra / (France) Maxime Teixeira
- (France) Quentin Halys / (France) Tristan Lamasine

The following pair received entry into the doubles main draw with a protected ranking:

- (Brazil) André Ghem / (Croatia) Ante Pavić

== Champions ==
=== Singles ===
- (Australia) Thanasi Kokkinakis def. (Netherlands) Thiemo de Bakker, 6–4, 1–6, 7–6^{(7–5)}

=== Doubles ===
- (Netherlands) Thiemo de Bakker / (Netherlands) Robin Haase def. (France) Lucas Pouille / (Ukraine) Sergiy Stakhovsky, 6–3, 7–5
