= 2012 BNP Paribas Primrose Bordeaux =

Tennis tournament

- Date: 14–20 May
- Edition: 5th
- Surface: Clay
- Location: Bordeaux, France

Champions

Singles
- (Slovakia) Martin Kližan

Doubles
- (Slovakia) Martin Kližan / (Slovakia) Igor Zelenay
← 2011 ·	BNP Paribas Primrose Bordeaux	· 2013 →

The 2012 BNP Paribas Primrose Bordeaux was a professional tennis tournament played on clay courts. It was the fifth edition of the tournament which was part of the 2012 ATP Challenger Tour. It took place in Bordeaux, France between 14 and 20 May 2012.

== Singles main draw entrants ==
=== Seeds ===
Country	Player	Rank^{1}	Seed
FRA	Jérémy Chardy	52	1
BEL	Steve Darcis	63	2
FRA	Benoît Paire	67	3
ARG	Leonardo Mayer	68	4
ESP	Rubén Ramírez Hidalgo	73	5
FRA	Édouard Roger-Vasselin	84	6
GER	Björn Phau	85	7
POR	Rui Machado	87	8

- ^{1} Rankings are as of May 7, 2012.

=== Other entrants ===
The following players received wildcards into the singles main draw:

- (France) Marc Gicquel
- (France) Paul-Henri Mathieu
- (France) Josselin Ouanna
- (France) Florent Serra

The following players received entry as a special exempt into the singles main draw:

- (Belgium) Ruben Bemelmans
- (Chinese Taipei) Yang Tsung-hua

The following players received entry from the qualifying draw:

- (Portugal) Gastão Elias
- (Russia) Teymuraz Gabashvili
- (France) Pierre-Hugues Herbert
- (Colombia) Carlos Salamanca

== Champions ==
=== Singles ===
- (Slovakia) Martin Kližan def. (Russia) Teymuraz Gabashvili, 7–5, 6–3

=== Doubles ===
- (Slovakia) Martin Kližan / (Slovakia) Igor Zelenay vs. (France) Olivier Charroin / (United Kingdom) Jonathan Marray, 7–6^{(7–5)}, 4–6, [10–4]
