= 2019 BNP Paribas Primrose Bordeaux =

- Date: 29 April – 5 May
- Edition: 12th
- Surface: Clay
- Location: Bordeaux, France

Champions

Singles
- (France) Lucas Pouille

Doubles
- (France) Grégoire Barrère / (France) Quentin Halys
← 2018 ·	BNP Paribas Primrose Bordeaux	· 2022 →

The 2019 BNP Paribas Primrose Bordeaux is a professional tennis tournament played on clay courts. It is the twelfth edition of the tournament and part of the 2019 ATP Challenger Tour. It takes place in Bordeaux, France between 29 April and 5 May 2019.

== Singles main-draw entrants ==
=== Seeds ===
Country	Player	Rank^{1}	Seed
FRA	Lucas Pouille	32	1
FRA	Adrian Mannarino	56	2
FRA	Jo-Wilfried Tsonga	99	3
FRA	Grégoire Barrère	119	4
FRA	Antoine Hoang	135	5
ITA	Gianluca Mager	144	6
GER	Oscar Otte	146	7
USA	Marcos Giron	157	8
SWE	Mikael Ymer	176	9
BEL	Kimmer Coppejans	182	10
SVK	Filip Horanský	187	11
FRA	Quentin Halys	191	12
ITA	Roberto Marcora	194	13
FRA	Maxime Janvier	201	14
CZE	Zdeněk Kolář	220	15
ESP	Tommy Robredo	224	16

- ^{1} Rankings are as of 22 April 2019.

=== Other entrants ===
The following players received wildcards into the singles main draw:

- (France) Pierre Delage
- (France) Laurent Lokoli
- (France) Matteo Martineau
- (France) Lucas Pouille
- (France) Jo-Wilfried Tsonga

The following player received entry into the singles main draw as a special exempt:

- (Germany) Oscar Otte

The following players received entry into the singles main draw using their ITF World Tennis Ranking:

- (Italy) Raúl Brancaccio
- (France) Evan Furness
- (France) Grégoire Jacq
- (Egypt) Karim-Mohamed Maamoun
- (Spain) Oriol Roca Batalla

The following players received entry from the qualifying draw:

- (Monaco) Hugo Nys
- (France) Albano Olivetti

== Champions ==
=== Singles ===
- (France) Lucas Pouille def. (Sweden) Mikael Ymer 6–3, 6–3.

=== Doubles ===
- (France) Grégoire Barrère / (France) Quentin Halys def. (Monaco) Romain Arneodo / (Monaco) Hugo Nys 6–4, 6–1.
