= 2013 BNP Paribas Primrose Bordeaux =

- Date: 13–19 May
- Edition: 6th
- Draw: 32S / 16D
- Prize money: €85,000+H
- Surface: Clay
- Location: Bordeaux, France

Champions

Singles
- (France) Gaël Monfils

Doubles
- (Germany) Christopher Kas / (Austria) Oliver Marach
← 2012 ·	BNP Paribas Primrose Bordeaux	· 2014 →

The 2013 BNP Paribas Primrose Bordeaux was a professional tennis tournament played on clay courts. It was the sixth edition of the tournament which was part of the 2013 ATP Challenger Tour. It took place in Bordeaux, France between 13 and 19 May 2013.

== Singles main draw entrants ==
=== Seeds ===
Country	Player	Rank^{1}	Seed
BEL	David Goffin	59	1
FRA	Michaël Llodra	61	2
ESP	Guillermo García López	68	3
FRA	Édouard Roger-Vasselin	74	4
FRA	Paul-Henri Mathieu	75	5
FRA	Kenny de Schepper	85	6
UKR	Sergiy Stakhovsky	93	7
ARG	Martín Alund	97	8

- ^{1} Rankings are as of May 6, 2013.

=== Other entrants ===
The following players received wildcards into the singles main draw:

- (France) Pierre-Hugues Herbert
- (France) Gaël Monfils
- (France) Josselin Ouanna
- (France) Florent Serra

The following players received entry as an alternate into the singles main draw:

- (United States) Denis Kudla

The following players received entry from the qualifying draw:

- (Argentina) Facundo Bagnis
- (Spain) Pablo Carreño Busta
- (France) Jonathan Dasnières de Veigy
- (Kazakhstan) Mikhail Kukushkin

The following player received entry as a lucky loser:

- (Poland) Michał Przysiężny

== Doubles main draw entrants ==
=== Seeds ===
Country	Player	Country	Player	Rank^{1}	Seed
COL	Juan Sebastián Cabal	COL	Robert Farah	97	1
GER	Christopher Kas	AUT	Oliver Marach	114	2
SWE	Johan Brunström	GBR	Ken Skupski	119	3
FRA	Nicolas Mahut	FRA	Édouard Roger-Vasselin	125	4

- ^{1} Rankings are as of May 6, 2013.

=== Other entrants ===
The following pairs received wildcards into the doubles main draw:

- (France) Marc Gicquel / (France) Romain Jouan
- (France) Pierre-Hugues Herbert / (France) Nicolas Renavand
- (France) Josselin Ouanna / (France) Laurent Rochette

The following pair received entry using a protected ranking:

- (Argentina) Eduardo Schwank / (Brazil) João Souza

== Champions ==
=== Singles ===
- (France) Gaël Monfils def. (France) Michaël Llodra, 7–5, 7–6^{(7–5)}

=== Doubles ===
- (Germany) Christopher Kas / (Austria) Oliver Marach def. (United States) Nicholas Monroe / (Germany) Simon Stadler, 2–6, 6–4, [10–1]
