= 2018 BNP Paribas Primrose Bordeaux =

- Date: 14–20 May
- Edition: 11th
- Surface: Clay
- Location: Bordeaux, France

Champions

Singles
- (United States) Reilly Opelka

Doubles
- (United States) Bradley Klahn / (Canada) Peter Polansky
← 2017 ·	BNP Paribas Primrose Bordeaux	· 2019 →

The 2018 BNP Paribas Primrose Bordeaux was a professional tennis tournament played on clay courts. It was the eleventh edition of the tournament which was part of the 2018 ATP Challenger Tour. It took place in Bordeaux, France between 14 and 20 May 2018.

== Singles main-draw entrants ==
=== Seeds ===
Country	Player	Rank^{1}	Seed
FRA	Jérémy Chardy	74	1
FRA	Pierre-Hugues Herbert	76	2
MDA	Radu Albot	98	3
FRA	Nicolas Mahut	110	4
BRA	Rogério Dutra Silva	116	5
USA	Denis Kudla	117	6
BRA	Thiago Monteiro	122	7
FRA	Calvin Hemery	123	8

- ^{1} Rankings are as of May 7, 2018.

=== Other entrants ===
The following players received wildcards into the singles main draw:

- (France) Grégoire Barrère
- (Belgium) Arthur De Greef
- (France) Ugo Humbert
- (Ukraine) Sergiy Stakhovsky

The following player received entry into the singles main draw as an alternate:

- (France) Antoine Hoang

The following players received entry from the qualifying draw:

- (France) Elliot Benchetrit
- (France) Maxime Janvier
- (France) Alexandre Müller
- (Australia) Alexei Popyrin

The following player received entry as a lucky loser:

- (France) Mathias Bourgue

== Champions ==
=== Singles ===
- (United States) Reilly Opelka def. (France) Grégoire Barrère 6–7^{(5–7)}, 6–4, 7–5.

=== Doubles ===
- (United States) Bradley Klahn / (Canada) Peter Polansky def. (Argentina) Guillermo Durán / (Argentina) Máximo González 6–3, 3–6, [10–7].
