= Tomás Martín Etcheverry =

Argentine tennis player (born 1999)

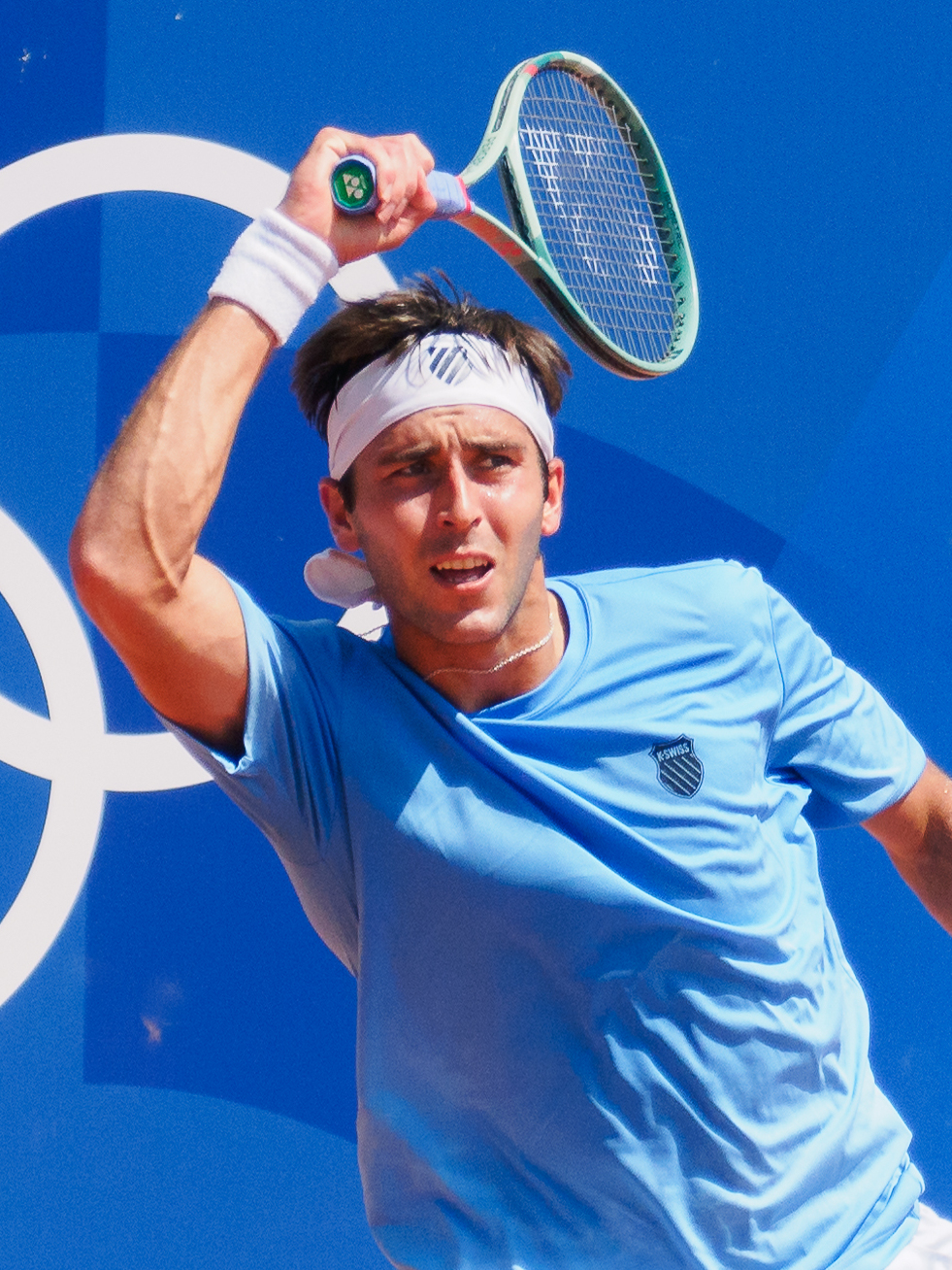
- Etcheverry at the 2024 Summer Olympics
- Country (sports): Argentina
- Born: 18 July 1999 (age 27) La Plata, Argentina
- Height: 1.96 m (6 ft 5 in)
- Turned pro: 2017
- Plays: Right-handed (two-handed backhand)
- Coach: Walter Grinovero, Kevin Konfederak
- Prize money: US $8,521,375

Singles
- Career record: 119–130
- Career titles: 1
- Highest ranking: No. 25 (18 May 2026)
- Current ranking: No. 29 (9 November 2026)

Grand Slam singles results
- Australian Open: 3R (2024, 2026)
- French Open: QF (2023)
- Wimbledon: 2R (2023, 2024)
- US Open: 4R (2026)

Other tournaments
- Olympic Games: 2R (2024)

Doubles
- Career record: 27–76
- Career titles: 0
- Highest ranking: No. 78 (9 November 2026)
- Current ranking: No. 78 (9 November 2026)

Grand Slam doubles results
- Australian Open: 3R (2026)
- French Open: 1R (2022, 2023)
- Wimbledon: 1R (2022, 2023, 2025, 2026)
- US Open: 3R (2025)

Other doubles tournaments
- Olympic Games: 1R (2024)
- Last updated on: 9 November 2026.

Tomás Martín Etcheverry (born 18 July 1999) is an Argentine professional tennis player. He has a career-high ATP singles ranking of world No. 25 achieved on 18 May 2026 and a doubles ranking of No. 78 achieved on 9 November 2026. He is currently the No. 2 singles player from Argentina.

Etcheverry has won one ATP Tour singles title at the 2026 Rio Open. He represents Argentina at the Davis Cup.

== Professional career ==
=== 2021: ATP and top 150 debuts, maiden Challenger title ===
Etcheverry made his ATP main draw debut at the 2021 Delray Beach Open and won his first ATP match at the 2021 Córdoba Open defeating Andrej Martin.

Etcheverry won his maiden Challenger title in Perugia, Italy, defeating top seed Salvatore Caruso in the semifinal, for his maiden top 100 win, and Vitaliy Sachko in the final, rising to a new career-high ranking of World No. 166 on 19 July 2021. He made his top 150 debut in singles at World No. 148 on 2 August 2021 after winning the Challenger title in Trieste, Italy. A week later he made his third Challenger final in Cordenons, Italy for 2021, where he lost to compatriot Francisco Cerúndolo.

=== 2022: Grand Slam and top 100 debuts ===
Etcheverry made his Grand Slam main draw debut at the 2022 Australian Open after defeating Kimmer Coppejans, Jason Kubler, and Flavio Cobolli in qualifications. He lost to 19th seed Pablo Carreño Busta in the first round.

Etcheverry reached the top 100 at world No. 95 on 11 April 2022. As a result, he made his Grand Slam debut as a direct entry at Roland Garros, Wimbledon and at the US Open.

=== 2023: Major quarterfinal, Masters debut, Argentine No. 2, top 30 ===
Etcheverry recorded his first Major win at the 2023 Australian Open defeating Grégoire Barrère.

At the 2023 Argentina Open, he reached his first ATP quarterfinal after defeating Hugo Dellien and Roberto Carballés Baena. In Rio, he lost to seventh seed Albert Ramos Viñolas. At the 2023 Chile Open he defeated Fabio Fognini in the first round. Next he defeated second seed Francisco Cerúndolo to reach his second quarterfinal for the biggest win of his career. He reached his first ATP semifinal defeating Dušan Lajović and then defeated third seed Sebastián Báez to reach his first-ever final. As a result, he moved to a new career high in the top 65 in the rankings. He lost in the final in three sets to home favorite Nicolás Jarry.

Etcheverry made his Masters 1000 debut at Indian Wells as a direct entry where he lost to Andy Murray. In Miami he recorded his first Masters win over qualifier Pavel Kotov.

He reached his second final of the season at the U.S. Men's Clay Court Championships, having to play four matches in two days due to rain, defeating qualifier Yannick Hanfmann in straight sets in the semifinal. He lost to top seed Frances Tiafoe in the final. As a result, he moved to a new career high in the top 60 at world No. 59 on 10 April 2023.

In Rome he lost to world No. 1 Novak Djokovic in the second round. He reached the final at the Challenger 175, the 2023 BNP Paribas Primrose Bordeaux. He lost to Ugo Humbert in the final but still made his top 50 debut on 22 May 2023.

At the 2023 French Open he reached the quarterfinals of a Major for the first time defeating Jack Draper by retirement, 18th seed Alex de Minaur, 15th seed Borna Ćorić, and 27th seed Yoshihito Nishioka without dropping a set. As a result, he moved to the top 35 in the rankings at world No. 32 on 12 June 2023 becoming the Argentine No. 2 player and the top 30 a week later.

He recorded his maiden win at the 2023 Wimbledon Championships defeating Bernabé Zapata Miralles after being two sets to love down in a 4 and 1/2 hours match over two days after play was suspended due to darkness. He lost to Stan Wawrinka in the second round. He also won his first round match at the US Open against first time Major qualifier Otto Virtanen in a five sets match lasting also close to 4 and 1/2 hours.

At the 2023 Zhuhai Championships he reached the quarterfinals but lost to fourth seed Sebastian Korda. On his debut at the 2023 Rolex Shanghai Masters he lost on the second round (having received a bye in the first round) to Zhizhen Zhang. At the 2023 Swiss Indoors he reached again the quarterfinals taking his revenge on eight seed Sebastian Korda and Andy Murray. He lost to top seed Holger Rune after double faulting on match point.

=== 2024: Third ATP final ===
At the 2024 ATP Lyon Open where he reached his third final, Etcheverry lost to wildcard Giovanni Mpetshi Perricard.

=== 2025: Toronto third round ===
Etcheverry started his season by representing Argentina at the United Cup. Argentina was in Group F alongside Australia and Great Britain. Against Australia, he lost to Alex de Minaur in singles. In mixed doubles, he and comptriot María Lourdes Carlé stunned Matthew Ebden/Ellen Perez to win the tie over Australia 2–1. Against Great Britain, he beat Billy Harris; however, in mixed doubles, he and María Lourdes Carlé lost to Katie Boulter/Charles Broom. Argentina lost the tie to Great Britain 2–1. Seeded 8th at the Adelaide International, he was defeated in the second round by Australian wildcard, Thanasi Kokkinakis, in a tight three-set match. At the Australian Open, he reached the second round where he lost to Marcos Giron in five sets.

Etcheverry reached the third round at the Masters 1000, the 2025 National Bank Open in Toronto, but lost to compatriot Francisco Cerundolo.

=== 2026: ATP title, Four Masters rounds of 16, Latin American No. 1, top 25 ===
At the ATP 500, the 2026 Rio Open, Etcheverry defeated qualifier Vilius Gaubas, lucky loser Jaime Faria, Vit Kopriva, and Alejandro Tabilo in the final to win his maiden ATP Tour title.

At the 2026 Miami Open, he reached the fourth round of a Masters 1000 for the first time in his career with wins over Zizou Bergs and Rafael Jodar. Etcheverry also reached the last 16 at the 2026 Monte-Carlo Masters. Following a second consecutive round of 16 showing for the season, at the 2026 Mutua Madrid Open, Etcheverry reached a career high ranking of No. 26 and became the Latin American No. 1 on 4 May 2026, and the top 25 two weeks later, on 18 May 2026.

== Performance Timeline ==
Key
W	F	SF	QF	#R	RR	Q#	DNQ	A	NH

(W) winner; (F) finalist; (SF) semifinalist; (QF) quarterfinalist; (#R) rounds 4, 3, 2, 1; (RR) round-robin stage; (Q#) qualification round; (DNQ) did not qualify; (A) absent; (NH) not held; (SR) strike rate (events won / competed); (W–L) win–loss record.
To avoid confusion and double counting, these charts are updated at the conclusion of a tournament or when the player's participation has ended.

=== Singles ===
Tournament	2021	2022	2023	2024	2025	2026	SR	W–L	Win %
Grand Slam tournaments
Australian Open	A	1R	2R	3R	2R	3R	0 / 5	6–5	55%
French Open	Q2	1R	QF	3R	1R	1R	0 / 5	6–5	55%
Wimbledon	Q2	1R	2R	2R	1R	1R	0 / 5	2–5	33%
US Open	Q1	1R	2R	3R	2R	4R	0 / 5	7–5	50%
Win–loss	0–0	0–4	7–4	7–4	2–4	5–4	0 / 20	21–20	50%
ATP Masters 1000 tournaments
Indian Wells	A	A	1R	A	1R	2R	0 / 3	0–3	0%
Miami Open	A	A	2R	2R	1R	4R	0 / 4	3–4	43%
Monte-Carlo	A	A	A	2R	2R	4R	0 / 3	4–3	57%
Madrid Open	A	A	2R	2R	2R	4R	0 / 4	4–4	50%
Italian Open	A	A	2R	3R	1R	2R	0 / 4	2–4	33%
Canadian Open	A	A	1R	2R	3R	2R	0 / 4	3–4	43%
Cincinnati Open	A	A	1R	2R	2R	2R	0 / 4	2–4	33%
Shanghai Masters	NH		2R	3R	A	2R	0 / 3	1–3	25%
Paris Masters	A	A	2R	2R	1R	3R	0 / 4	4–4	33%
Win–loss	0–0	0–0	4–8	6–8	5–8	8–9	0 / 33	23–33	41%
Career statistics	2021	2022	2023	2024	2025	2026	Total		
Tournaments	2	14	27	29	30	12	114		
Titles / Finals	0 / 0	0 / 0	0 / 2	0 / 1	0 / 0	1 / 1	1 / 3		
Overall win–loss	1–2	3–14	30–27	31–29	26–30	20–12	111–114		
Year-end ranking	130	79	30	39	60		48.8%		

== ATP Tour finals ==
=== Singles: 4 (1 title, 3 runner-ups) ===
Legend ATP 500 (1–0) ATP 250 (0–3)	Finals by surface Clay (1–3)	Finals by setting Outdoor (1–3)

Result	W–L	Date	Tournament	Tier	Surface	Opponent	Score
Loss	0–1	Mar 2023	Chile Open, Chile	ATP 250	Clay	(Chile) Nicolás Jarry	7–6^{(7–5)}, 6–7^{(5–7)}, 2–6
Loss	0–2	Apr 2023	U.S. Men's Clay Championships, US	ATP 250	Clay	(United States) Frances Tiafoe	6–7^{(1–7)}, 6–7^{(6–8)}
Loss	0–3	May 2024	Lyon Open, France	ATP 250	Clay	(France) Giovanni Mpetshi Perricard	4–6, 6–1, 6–7^{(7–9)}
Win	1–3	Feb 2026	Rio Open, Brazil	ATP 500	Clay	(Chile) Alejandro Tabilo	3–6, 7–6^{(7–3)}, 6–4

== ATP Challenger Tour finals ==
=== Singles: 10 (3 titles, 7 runner-ups) ===
Legend ATP Challenger (3–7)	Finals by surface Hard (–) Clay (3–7)

Result	W–L	Date	Tournament	Surface	Opponent	Score
Loss	0–1	Sep 2020	Sibiu Open, Romania	Clay	(Switzerland) Marc-Andrea Hüsler	5–7, 0–6
Win	1–1	Jul 2021	Internazionali Città di Perugia, Italy	Clay	(Ukraine) Vitaliy Sachko	7–5, 6–2
Win	2–1	Jul 2021	Internazionali Città di Trieste, Italy	Clay	(Argentina) Thiago Agustín Tirante	6–1, 6–1
Loss	2–2	Aug 2021	Internazionali del Friuli Venezia Giulia, Italy	Clay	(Argentina) Francisco Cerúndolo	1–6, 2–6
Win	3–2	Mar 2022	Biobío Challenger, Chile	Clay	(Bolivia) Hugo Dellien	6–3, 6–2
Loss	3–3	Apr 2022	Mexico City Open, Mexico	Clay	(Switzerland) Marc-Andrea Hüsler	4–6, 2–6
Loss	3–4	Jun 2022	Internazionali Città di Perugia, Italy	Clay	(Spain) Jaume Munar	3–6, 6–4, 1–6
Loss	3–5	Oct 2022	Lima Challenger II, Peru	Clay	(Germany) Daniel Altmaier	1–6, 7–6^{(7–4)}, 4–6
Loss	3–6	Nov 2022	Uruguay Open, Uruguay	Clay	(Argentina) Genaro Olivieri	7–6^{(7–3)}, 6–7^{(5–7)}, 3–6
Loss	3–7	May 2023	Bordeaux Open, France	Clay	(France) Ugo Humbert	6–7^{(3–7)}, 4–6

=== Doubles: 2 (1 title, 1 runner-up) ===
Legend ATP Challenger (1–1)

Result	W–L	Date	Tournament	Surface	Partner	Opponents	Score
Win	1–0	May 2021	Biella Challenger VII, Italy	Clay	(Argentina) Renzo Olivo	(Venezuela) Luis David Martínez (Spain) David Vega Hernández	3–6, 6–3, [10–8]
Loss	1–1	Jul 2021	Internazionali Città di Perugia, Italy	Clay	(Argentina) Renzo Olivo	(Ukraine) Vitaliy Sachko (Switzerland) Dominic Stricker	3–6, 7–5, [8–10]

== ITF Tour finals ==
=== Singles: 12 (5 titles, 7 runner-ups) ===
Legend ITF Futures/World Tennis (5–7)	Finals by surface Hard (0–1) Clay (5–6)

Result	W–L	Date	Tournament	Surface	Opponent	Score
Loss	0–1	Aug 2018	Italy F21, Bolzano	Clay	(Brazil) João Souza	6–7^{(3–7)}, 4–6
Win	1–1	Aug 2018	Belgium F7, Eupen	Clay	(Belgium) Jeroen Vanneste	6–3, 6–3
Win	2–1	Aug 2018	Italy F24, Cuneo	Clay	(Italy) Davide Galoppini	6–4, 6–2
Loss	2–2	Oct 2018	Peru F3, Lima	Clay	(Chile) Bastián Malla	3–6, 1–6
Loss	2–3	Mar 2019	M15 Pinamar, Argentina	Clay	(Argentina) Hernán Casanova	2–6, 2–6
Loss	2–4	May 2019	M15 Cancún, Mexico	Hard	(United Kingdom) Ryan Peniston	4–6, 5–7
Loss	2–5	Aug 2019	M15 Tabarka, Tunisia	Clay	(Argentina) Matias Zukas	2–6, 6–3, 5–7
Win	3–5	Sep 2019	M15 Tabarka, Tunisia	Clay	(Italy) Lorenzo Bocchi	6–1, 6–1
Win	4–5	Sep 2019	M15 Tabarka, Tunisia	Clay	(Zimbabwe) Benjamin Lock	6–4, 6–1
Loss	4–6	Oct 2019	M25 Rio de Janeiro, Brazil	Clay	(Argentina) Sebastián Báez	6–4, 4–6, 1–4 ret.
Win	5–6	Nov 2019	M25 Naples, US	Clay	(United States) Martin Damm Jr.	7–6^{(7–4)}, 7–5
Loss	5–7	Mar 2020	M25 Río Cuarto, Argentina	Clay	(Argentina) Camilo Ugo Carabelli	6–7^{(9–11)}, 2–6

=== Doubles: 12 (6 titles, 6 runner-ups) ===
Legend ITF Futures/World Tennis (6–6)	Finals by surface Hard (2–0) Clay (4–6)

Result	W–L	Date	Tournament	Surface	Partner	Opponents	Score
Win	1–0	May 2018	Brazil F3, Brasília	Clay	(Brazil) Thiago Seyboth Wild	(Brazil) Oscar Gutierrez (Brazil) Igor Marcondes	6–7^{(1–7)}, 7–6^{(7–3)}, [11–9]
Loss	1–1	Jul 2018	Italy F20, Pontedera	Clay	(Argentina) Matias Zukas	(Argentina) Genaro Olivieri (Argentina) Camilo Ugo Carabelli	6–7^{(2–7)}, 7–6^{(9–7)}, [3–10]
Loss	1–2	Aug 2018	Germany F12, Karlsrühe	Clay	(Argentina) Alejo Vilaro	(France) Hugo Voljacques (Germany) Kai Wehnelt	5–7, 5–7
Loss	1–3	Aug 2018	Italy F24, Cuneo	Clay	(Italy) Corrado Summaria	(Italy) Marco Bortolotti (Italy) Walter Trusendi	3–6, 0–6
Loss	1–4	Nov 2018	Chile F2, Santiago	Clay	(Argentina) Matias Zukas	(Argentina) Juan Pablo Paz (Argentina) Santiago Rodríguez Taverna	4–6, 4–6
Win	2–4	Dec 2018	Dominican Republic F3, Santo Domingo	Hard	(Brazil) Oscar Gutierrez	(Peru) Arklon Huertas del Pino (Peru) Conner Huertas del Pino	6–3, 6–2
Win	3–4	May 2019	M15 Buenos Aires, Argentina	Clay	(Argentina) Mariano Kestelboim	(Argentina) Maximiliano Estévez (Argentina) Agustín Velotti	4–6, 6–4, [10–3]
Win	4–4	May 2019	M15 Cancún, Mexico	Hard	(Argentina) Camilo Ugo Carabelli	(United States) Jordi Arconada (United States) Harrison Adams	6–4, 6–3
Loss	4–5	Jul 2019	M25 Cuneo, Italy	Clay	(Italy) Andrea Gola	(Romania) Victor Vlad Cornea (Romania) Mircea-Alexandru Jecan	4–6, 3–6
Loss	4–6	Aug 2019	M15 Tabarka, Tunisia	Clay	(Chile) Esteban Bruna	(Argentina) Franco Feitt (Argentina) Guido Iván Justo	4–6, 2–6
Win	5–6	Nov 2019	M25 Naples, US	Clay	(Argentina) Camilo Ugo Carabelli	(Belgium) Benjamin Dhoe (France) Maxime Mora	6–4, 6–0
Win	6–6	Mar 2020	M25 Río Cuarto, Argentina	Clay	(Argentina) Mariano Kestelboim	(Peru) Alexander Merino (Argentina) Manuel Peña López	6–3, 1–6, [10–2]

== Wins over top 10 players ==
- Etcheverry has a 1–20 (4.76%) record against players who were, at the time the match was played, ranked in the top 10.

Season	2026	Total
Wins	1	1

#	Player	Rk	Event	Surface	Rd	Score	Rk	Ref
2026
1.	(Australia) Alex de Minaur	9	Paris Masters, France	Hard (i)	2R	7–6^{(7–2)}, 6–3	31	

- Key: (Rk) first use, opponent rank; (Rd) round; (Rk) 2nd use, player rank; (Ref) reference; (F) final; (SF) semifinal; (QF) quarterfinal; (#R) rounds 4, 3, 2, 1; (RR) round-robin stage; (Q#) qualifying rounds or stages (3), 2, 1.

* Statistics correct as of 4 November 2026.
