= 2023 BNP Paribas Primrose Bordeaux =

- Date: 15 – 20 May
- Edition: 14th
- Surface: Clay
- Location: Bordeaux, France

Champions

Singles
- (France) Ugo Humbert

Doubles
- (United Kingdom) Lloyd Glasspool / (Finland) Harri Heliövaara
- BNP Paribas Primrose Bordeaux

The 2023 BNP Paribas Primrose Bordeaux was a professional tennis tournament played on clay courts. It was the 14th edition of the tournament and part of the 2023 ATP Challenger Tour. It took place in Bordeaux, France between 15 and 20 May 2023.

== Singles main-draw entrants ==
=== Seeds ===
Country	Player	Rank^{1}	Seed
GER	Jan-Lennard Struff	28	1
GBR	Andy Murray	42	2
FRA	Richard Gasquet	44	3
FRA	Adrian Mannarino	45	4
FRA	Ugo Humbert	50	5
SWE	Mikael Ymer	52	6
ARG	Tomás Martín Etcheverry	61	7
FRA	Corentin Moutet	67	8

- ^{1} Rankings are as of 8 May 2023.

=== Other entrants ===
The following players received wildcards into the singles main draw:

- (France) Mathias Bourgue
- (France) Arthur Cazaux
- (France) Harold Mayot

The following players received entry into the singles main draw as special exempts:

- (Serbia) Hamad Međedović
- (France) Benoît Paire

The following players received entry into the singles main draw as alternates:

- (France) Arthur Fils
- (Australia) Thanasi Kokkinakis
- (United Kingdom) Ryan Peniston
- (Kazakhstan) ~~Timofey Skatov~~
- (Austria) Dominic Thiem
- (Sweden) Elias Ymer

The following players received entry from the qualifying draw:

- (Morocco) Elliot Benchetrit
- (France) Ugo Blanchet
- (France) Kyrian Jacquet
- (Belgium) Gauthier Onclin

The following player received entry as a lucky loser:

- (Belgium) Michael Geerts

== Champions ==
=== Singles ===
- (France) Ugo Humbert def. (Argentina) Tomás Martín Etcheverry 7–6^{(7–3)}, 6–4.

=== Doubles ===
- (United Kingdom) Lloyd Glasspool / (Finland) Harri Heliövaara def. (France) Sadio Doumbia / (France) Fabien Reboul 6–4, 6–2.
