= Arthur Fils =

French tennis player (born 2004)

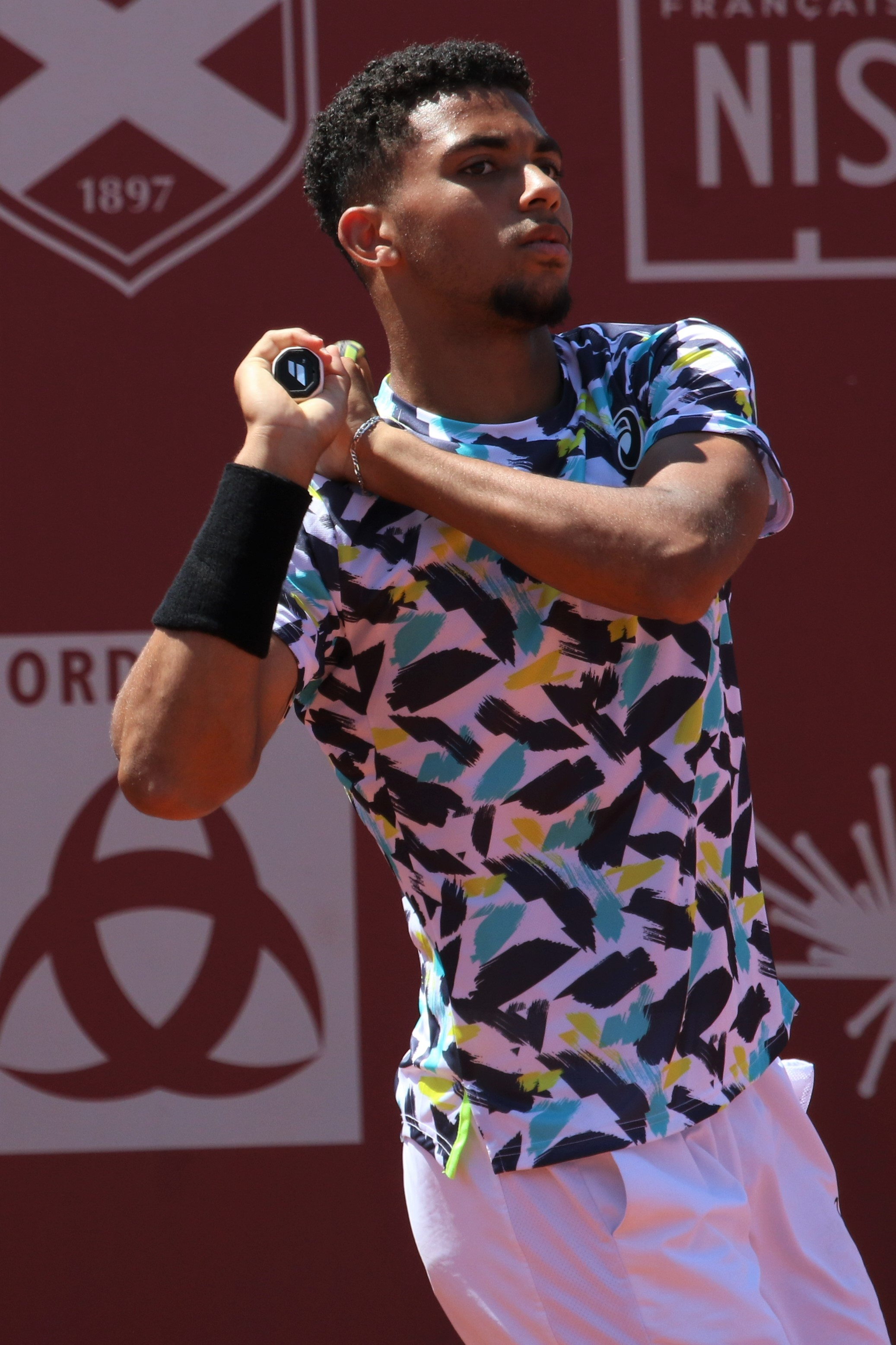
- Fils at the 2022 BNP Paribas Primrose Bordeaux
- Country (sports): France
- Born: 12 June 2004 (age 22) Courcouronnes, France
- Height: 1.85 m (6 ft 1 in)
- Turned pro: 2021
- Plays: Right-handed (two-handed backhand)
- Coach: Ivan Cinkuš (Jan 2025–); Goran Ivanišević (Feb 2026–present)
- Prize money: US $10,379,342

Singles
- Career record: 121–73
- Career titles: 5
- Highest ranking: No. 7 (2 November 2026)
- Current ranking: No. 7 (9 November 2026)

Grand Slam singles results
- Australian Open: 3R (2025)
- French Open: 3R (2025)
- Wimbledon: 4R (2024)
- US Open: 2R (2023, 2024)

Other tournaments
- Tour Finals: RR (2026)
- Olympic Games: 1R (2024)

Doubles
- Career record: 9–14
- Career titles: 0
- Highest ranking: No. 185 (4 August 2025)

Grand Slam doubles results
- French Open: 1R (2023)
- Wimbledon: 2R (2023)
- US Open: 1R (2023, 2024)

Other doubles tournaments
- Olympic Games: 1R (2024)
- Last updated on: 2 November 2026.

Arthur Fils (French pronunciation: [aʁtyʁ fis]; born 12 June 2004) is a French professional tennis player. He has a career-high ranking of world No. 7 in men's singles by the ATP, achieved on 2 November 2026 and a best doubles ranking of No. 185, reached in August 2025. Fils has won five ATP Tour singles titles, including a Masters 1000 event at the 2026 Cincinnati Open. His best result at the majors is reaching the fourth round at the 2024 Wimbledon Championships. He is the current No. 1 singles player from France.

== Early life ==
Raised in Bondoufle, Arthur Fils started playing tennis at the age of 5 with his father Jean-Philippe, who is originally from Haiti. His biggest tennis idols are Roger Federer and Jo-Wilfried Tsonga.

Licensed at the tennis club of Saint-Michel-sur-Orge, he has trained at the French National Training Center (indoor) of the French Tennis Federation just next to Stade Roland Garros since 2019.

== Career ==
=== 2020–22: Junior success, ATP Tour debut ===
In 2020, Fils won the prestigious Orange Bowl in the boys' singles category, becoming only the second French player to win the tournament since 2009. Fils' most notable results at junior-level came at his home major, the French Open. He won the boys' doubles title, with compatriot Giovanni Mpetshi Perricard, defeating Martin Katz and German Samofalov in the final. He was also a finalist in the boys' singles category. He reached an ITF junior combined ranking of world No. 3 on 5 July 2021.

Ranked world No. 308, Fils made his ATP Tour debut at the 2022 Rolex Paris Masters, when he became the youngest French qualifier, at 18 years, 4 months and 18 days, to enter the main-draw of a Masters 1000 tournament with a win against former top-10 player Fabio Fognini since Gaël Monfils in 2004, the year of his birth. He lost in the first round to Fognini, who entered the draw as lucky loser.

=== 2023: First major win & ATP title, top 40 ===
Fils won his maiden Challenger title at the Oeiras Indoors II. As a result he moved close to 60 positions up into the top 200 at world No. 195 on 16 January 2023.

Ranked No. 163, he received a wildcard entry into the Open Sud de France and recorded his first match win on the ATP Tour by defeating former world no. 7 Richard Gasquet in straight sets. Next he defeated fourth seed Roberto Bautista Agut to reach the quarterfinals becoming the first player born in 2004 or later to reach this ATP level. He defeated another countryman, Quentin Halys, becoming the youngest Frenchman since Gasquet to reach an ATP semifinal in Metz in 2004. In the semifinals, Fils lost to second seed Jannik Sinner who was ranked at No. 15 in the world. Despite the loss, he rose nearly 50 positions to make his debut in the top 150 at world No. 117 on 13 February 2023.

He made it back-to-back semifinals by reaching the last four at the Open 13 Provence in Marseille defeating Roman Safiullin, second seed Jannik Sinner after getting a walkover, and Stan Wawrinka in straight sets. As a result he moved another 15 positions up to No. 104 on 27 February 2023. He lost to compatriot Benjamin Bonzi.

He qualified into the main-draw for his first Masters 1000 on clay, the Italian Open and defeated fellow qualifier Juan Manuel Cerúndolo in the first round, before falling to the eventual runner-up, world No. 7 Holger Rune in the second round. He also received a wildcard for the following month’s 2023 French Open.

Following reaching his third semifinal of the season in Lyon after a walkover from top seed Félix Auger-Aliassime due to shoulder injury, Fils made his debut in the top 100 of the rankings on 29 May 2023, the youngest active player to reach the milestone. He won his maiden title defeating fourth seed Francisco Cerúndolo becoming the youngest champion in the tournament history. Ranked No. 112, Fils was also the lowest-ranked champion and the third first time winner in the season.

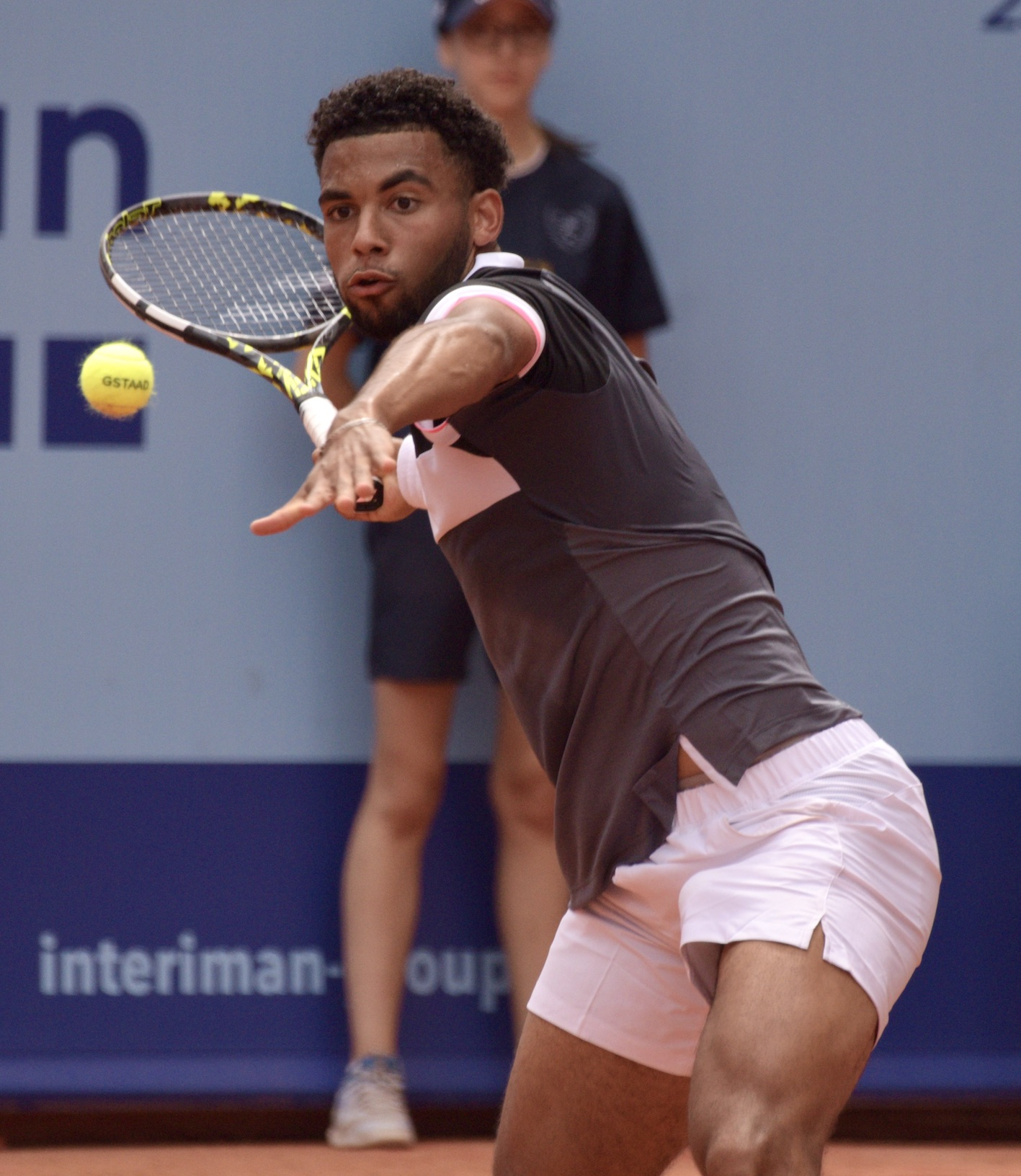
Fils at the 2023 Swiss Open Gstaad

In his French Open debut, his first-ever appearance in a Grand Slam, Fils was defeated in the first round by Alejandro Davidovich Fokina. He was awarded a wildcard for his main-draw debut at Wimbledon, losing again in the first round to Alejandro Davidovich Fokina. At the same tournament in doubles, Fils recorded his first Grand Slam doubles win, playing along with fellow countryman Luca Van Assche, defeating brothers Stefanos Tsitsipas and Petros Tsitsipas. Fils reached his first ATP 500 semifinal at the Hamburg European Open, defeating top seed Casper Ruud in the quarterfinal, his first win against a top-5 ranked player, before losing to the eventual champion Alexander Zverev, in the semifinals. He made his debut into the top 50 on 31 July 2023, following the tournament.

At the US Open, Fils earned his first Major win, defeating 24th seed Tallon Griekspoor in the first round. He then lost to Matteo Arnaldi in the second round.

Ranked No. 44 at the Shanghai Masters, on his debut at this tournament, he defeated Pavel Kotov and Alejandro Davidovich Fokina and made the top 40 on 16 October 2023. He lost to 12th seed Tommy Paul in the third round.

Fils reached his second final at the European Open in Antwerp with a win over top seed Stefanos Tsitsipas in straight sets with two tiebreaks, his second top-10 win of the season and his career. He became the youngest finalist in the tournament's history. He lost to third seed Alexander Bublik in the championship match.

In November, Fils qualified for the Next Generation ATP Finals and made it through to the final, which he lost to Hamad Medjedovic. Fils won the Newcomer of the Year award.

=== 2024: Wimbledon fourth round, ATP 500 titles ===
At the Monte-Carlo Masters, Fils made history by becoming the youngest Frenchman since Richard Gasquet in 2005, to win a match when he defeated Yannick Hanfmann in the first round. He lost to Lorenzo Musetti in the second round.

At the Barcelona Open he reached the quarterfinals, defeating Daniel Altmaier and fourth seed Alex de Minaur, before losing to Dušan Lajović. Despite the loss, he reached a new career-high of No. 32, entering the top 35 in the singles rankings on 22 April 2024. In May, Fils, as the top seed, won the Bordeaux Challenger, defeating second seed Pedro Martínez in the final.

In July, at Wimbledon, Fils reached the third round of a Grand Slam tournament for the first time in his career after defeating seventh seed Hubert Hurkacz in the second round via a retirement (on match point). Fils went on to defeat Roman Safiullin in the third round to reach the fourth round at a Major for the first time in his career. As a result, Fils would move up to a new career high ranking of No. 28 on 15 July 2024. He lost to world No. 9 Alex de Minaur in the fourth round in four sets.

At the Hamburg Open, he won his first ATP 500 title defeating top seed Alexander Zverev in the final, having recorded wins over Jaume Munar, Laslo Djere, second seed Holger Rune and third seed Sebastián Báez in earlier rounds. Fils' win over world No. 4 Zverev was his fourth top-10 win and his second top-5 win. As a result he entered the top 20 in the rankings on 22 July 2024.

He reached a second ATP 500 final at the Japan Open with upset wins over world No. 7 and top seed Taylor Fritz, Matteo Berrettini, defending champion and eighth seed Ben Shelton and sixth seed Holger Rune. He won his third ATP title defeating compatriot Ugo Humbert in three sets, defeating four top-20 opponents en route to becoming the second-youngest champion in Tokyo tournament history.

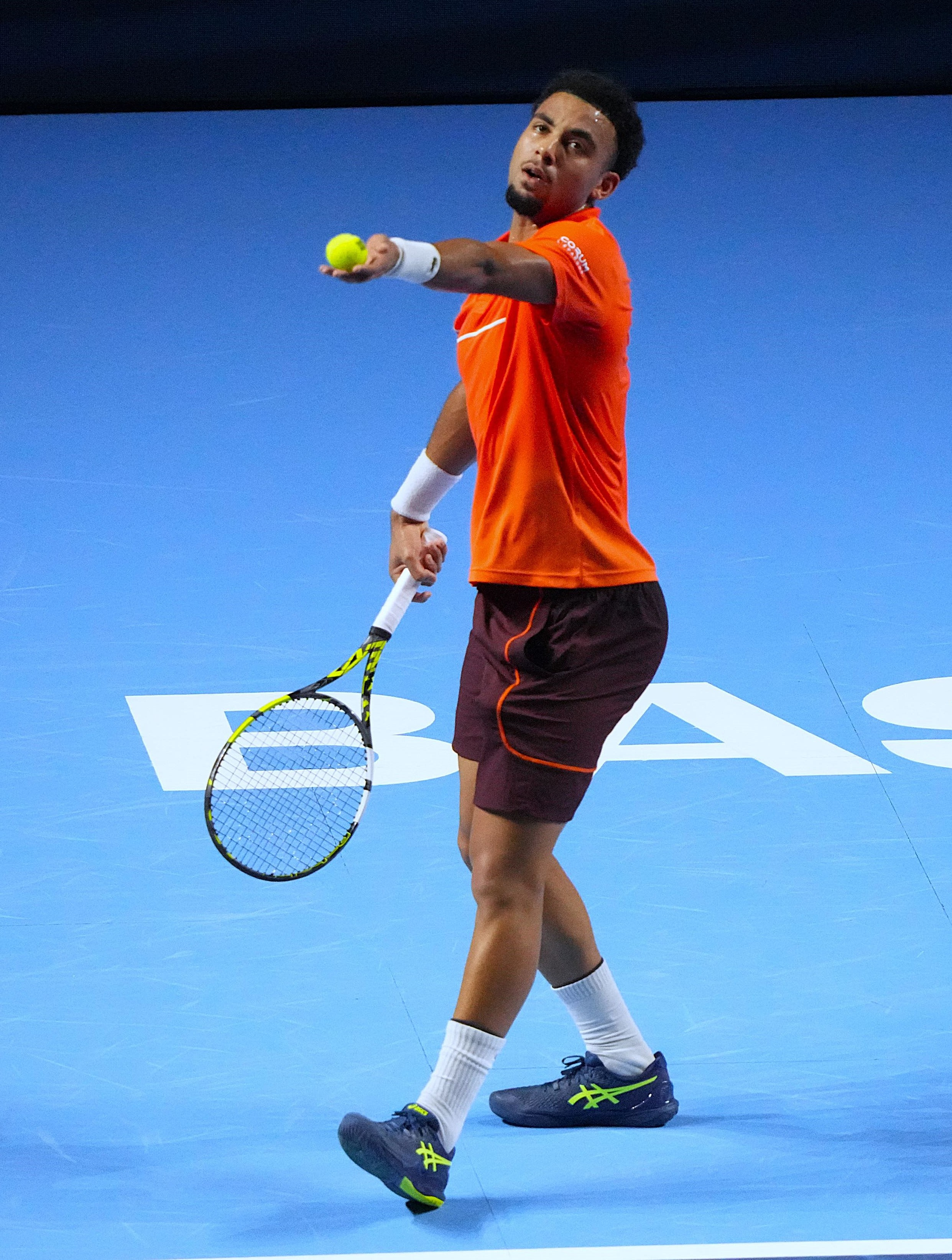
Arthur Fils in Basel 2024

Seeded seventh at the Swiss Indoors, Fils defeated third seed Stefanos Tsitsipas in the quarterfinals. He lost in the semifinals to sixth seed Ben Shelton.

=== 2025: Two ATP 1000 quarterfinals, back injury ===
At the Australian Open he defeated Otto Virtanen and fellow French player Quentin Halys to reach the third round for the first time at the tournament, where he retired due to a foot injury while trailing by two sets to one against another compatriot, 14th seed, Ugo Humbert.

At the Indian Wells Open, he reached his first Masters 1000 quarterfinal with wins over lucky loser Gabriel Diallo, sixth seed Lorenzo Musetti and Marcos Giron, before losing to fifth seed Daniil Medvedev in a deciding set tiebreak. Despite the loss he reached a new career-high ranking of World No. 18 on 17 March 2025. At the next Masters in Miami, he again reached the quarterfinals defeating world No. 2 Alexander Zverev in the third round, for the biggest win of his career. He became only the third Frenchman to reach the last eight at both ‘Sunshine Double’ events in the same year after Yannick Noah (1986-87, 1989) and Gael Monfils (2016). He lost to Jakub Menšík in straight sets the next day but still reached a new career-high rankings of No. 15 in the rankings on 31 March 2025.

Moving onto the European clay court swing of the season, Fils defeated Tallon Griekspoor, Flavio Cobolli and seventh seed Andrey Rublev to make it through to the quarterfinals at the Monte-Carlo Masters, at which point he lost to second seed and eventual champion Carlos Alcaraz in three sets. The following week at the Barcelona Open, he overcame wildcard entrant Pablo Carreño Busta, Pedro Martínez and third seed Stefanos Tsitsipas to reach the semifinals, where he run was ended by top seed Carlos Alcaraz for the second successive tournament. At the French Open, Fils was seeded 14th and won his first match at his home major, defeating Nicolás Jarry. He then overcame Jaume Munar in five sets, before being forced to withdraw from the tournament prior to his third round match against Andrey Rublev due to a back injury.

Apart from a brief return at the Canadian Open, where he played two matches, winning one and losing the next, Fils' back problems kept him out of action for the rest of 2025.

=== 2026: Cincinnati champion, ATP Finals debut, world No. 6 ===
Fils at the 2026 Cincinnati Open

Fils missed the first month of the 2026 season, including the 2026 Australian Open, while he continued to rehabilitate his back injury.

In February, he made his return to the competitive court at the Open Occitanie in Montpellier where he defeated Valentin Royer and lucky loser Ugo Blanchet, before losing to top seed and eventual champion Félix Auger-Aliassime in the quarterfinals. At the Qatar Open, Fils made it through to the final with wins over Kamil Majchrzak, lucky loser Quentin Halys eighth seed Jiří Lehečka. and sixth seed Jakub Menšík. He lost to world No. 1 Carlos Alcaraz in the championship match.

In March, Fils reached the quarterfinals at Indian Wells, at which point he lost to fourth seed Alexander Zverev, and followed this up by making it into the semifinals at the Miami Open, where he fell to 21st seed Jiří Lehečka.

In April, seeded ninth at the 2026 Barcelona Open Banc Sabadell Fils saved two match points before finally overcoming fellow French player Térence Atmane in the first round. He then recorded wins over Brandon Nakashima and second seed Lorenzo Musetti to reach the semifinals. In the last four, he defeated wildcard entrant Rafael Jódar, registering his 100th ATP Tour match win. Fils overcame fifth seed Andrey Rublev in the final to claim his fourth ATP title, and first since October 2024. As a result of his win, Fils moved back up to world No. 25 in the ATP rankings on 20 April 2026. He followed this by reaching the semifinals in Madrid, where he lost to world no. 1 Jannik Sinner. He retired in the second round of Rome the following week due to a stress fracture in his hip, an injury that also forced him to withdraw from the French Open. He returned from this injury at Wimbledon, where he lost in the second round to Matteo Berrettini.

At his third tournament back, in Montreal, Fils reached the quarterfinals of another Masters event, where he lost to Rafael Jódar. The following tournament in Cincinnati, he reached his third Masters 1000 semifinal, upsetting world no. 8 Alex de Minaur on his way there. He defeated Flavio Cobolli in the semifinal match to advance to his first Masters 1000 final.

After entering the Japan Open late, Fils qualified for the main draw and defeated world No. 8 Frances Tiafoe in the second round to reach the quarterfinals. Excluding the ATP Finals and Grand Slam Cup, this was only the second meeting between top-10 players in the second round of an ATP Tour event since 1990, following Ivan Lendl's match against Goran Ivanišević in Brussels in 1992. Fils lost to Valentin Vacherot in the quarterfinals.

At the 2026 ATP Finals, Fils made his official debut. He won against Jódar, but lost his other two matches against Ben Shelton and Zverev, placing third in his group and thus being eliminated in the round-robin stage. As a result of his win against Jódar, he climbed to a new career high of world No. 6.

== Coaching and playing style ==
He was coached by Laurent Raymond from the end of 2022 to the end of the 2023; Raymond was then replaced by former world No. 4 Sébastien Grosjean and former world No. 3 and two-time Roland Garros winner Sergi Bruguera. In March 2025, Fils split with his coach Sébastien Grosjean after 15 months.

In February 2026, Fils announced that 2001 Wimbledon champion Goran Ivanišević had joined Fils' coaching team.

Fils is a powerful player and uses his serve and forehand to quickly finish points. He is a top-level mover and ball-striker with a mix of topspin and pace, especially on his forehand on clay.

== Performance timelines ==
Key
W	F	SF	QF	#R	RR	Q#	P#	DNQ	A	Z#	PO	G	S	B	NMS	NTI	P	NH

(W) winner; (F) finalist; (SF) semifinalist; (QF) quarterfinalist; (#R) rounds 4, 3, 2, 1; (RR) round-robin stage; (Q#) qualification round; (P#) preliminary round; (DNQ) did not qualify; (A) absent; (Z#) Davis/Fed Cup Zonal Group (with number indication) or (PO) play-off; (G) gold, (S) silver or (B) bronze Olympic/Paralympic medal; (NMS) not a Masters tournament; (NTI) not a Tier I tournament; (P) postponed; (NH) not held; (SR) strike rate (events won / competed); (W–L) win–loss record.
To avoid confusion and double counting, these charts are updated at the conclusion of a tournament or when the player's participation has ended.

=== Singles ===
Tournament	2021	2022	2023	2024	2025	2026	SR	W–L	Win %
Grand Slam tournaments
Australian Open	A	A	A	2R	3R	A	0 / 2	3–2	60%
French Open	Q2	Q1	1R	1R	3R (Note: Arthur Fils withdrew in the third round, which does not count as a loss.)	A	0 / 3	2–2	50%
Wimbledon	A	A	1R	4R	A	2R	0 / 3	4–3	57%
US Open	A	A	2R	2R	A	1R	0 / 3	2–3	40%
Win–loss	0–0	0–0	1–3	5–4	4–1	1–2	0 / 11	11–10	52%
National representation
Summer Olympics	A	NH		1R	NH		0 / 1	0–1	0%
Davis Cup	A	A	RR	RR	QF		0 / 3	2–3	40%
ATP 1000 tournaments
Indian Wells Open	A	A	A	3R	QF	QF	0 / 3	8–3	71%
Miami Open	A	A	A	1R	QF	SF	0 / 3	7–3	70%
Monte-Carlo Masters	A	A	A	2R	QF	A	0 / 2	4–2	67%
Madrid Open	A	A	Q2	2R	2R	SF	0 / 3	4–3	57%
Italian Open	A	A	2R	2R	4R	2R	0 / 4	3–4	43%
Canadian Open	A	A	A	1R	3R	QF	0 / 3	4–3	33%
Cincinnati Open	A	A	1R	2R	A	W	1 / 3	7–2	78%
Shanghai Masters	NH		3R	2R	A	3R	0 / 3	3–3	50%
Paris Masters	Q1	1R	1R	3R	A	3R	0 / 4	3–4	43%
Win–loss	0–0	0–1	3–4	6–9	12–6	22–7	1 / 28	43–27	62%
Career statistics
	2021	2022	2023	2024	2025	2026	Career		
Tournaments	0	1	16	26	12	13	Career total: 68		
Titles	0	0	1	2	0	2	Career total: 5		
Finals	0	0	2	2	0	3	Career total: 7		
Hard win–loss	0–0	0–1	15–12	22–15	12–7	22–8	2 / 38	71–43	62%
Clay win–loss	0–0	0–0	8–4	10–10	10–4	9–2	3 / 24	37–20	65%
Grass win–loss	0–0	0–0	0–2	6–3	0–0	1–1	0 / 6	7–6	54%
Overall win–loss	0–0	0–1	23–18	38–28	22–11	32–11	5 / 68	115–69	63%
Win %	–	0%	56%	58%	67%	74%	Career total: 63%		
Year-end ranking	613	251	36	20	39		$9,597,514		

== ATP Masters 1000 finals ==
=== Singles: 1 (title) ===
Result	Year	Tournament	Surface	Opponent	Score
Win	2026	Cincinnati Open	Hard	(United States) Frances Tiafoe	6–3, 1–6, 6–0

== ATP Tour finals ==
=== Singles: 7 (5 titles, 2 runner-ups) ===
Legend Grand Slam (–) ATP 1000 (1–0) ATP 500 (3–1) ATP 250 (1–1)	Finals by surface Hard (2–2) Clay (3–0) Grass (–)	Finals by setting Outdoor (5–1) Indoor (0–1)

Result	W–L	Date	Tournament	Tier	Surface	Opponent	Score
Win	1–0	May 2023	Lyon Open, France	ATP 250	Clay	(Argentina) Francisco Cerúndolo	6–3, 7–5
Loss	1–1	Oct 2023	European Open, Belgium	ATP 250	Hard (i)	(Kazakhstan) Alexander Bublik	4–6, 4–6
Win	2–1	Jul 2024	Hamburg Open, Germany	ATP 500	Clay	(Germany) Alexander Zverev	6–3, 3–6, 7–6^{(7–1)}
Win	3–1	Oct 2024	Japan Open, Japan	ATP 500	Hard	(France) Ugo Humbert	5–7, 7–6^{(8–6)}, 6–3
Loss	3–2	Feb 2026	Qatar Open, Qatar	ATP 500	Hard	(Spain) Carlos Alcaraz	2–6, 1–6
Win	4–2	Apr 2026	Barcelona Open, Spain	ATP 500	Clay	Andrey Rublev	6–2, 7–6^{(7–2)}
Won	5–2	Aug 2026	Cincinnati Open, United States	ATP 1000	Hard	(United States) Frances Tiafoe	6–3, 1–6, 6–0

== National and international representation ==
=== Team competitions finals: 1 (runner-up) ===
Finals by tournaments
Laver Cup (0–1)

Result	Year	Tournament	Surface	Team	Partner(s)	Opponent team	Opponent players	Score
Loss	2023	Laver Cup	Hard (i)	Team Europe	Casper Ruud; Andrey Rublev; Hubert Hurkacz; Alejandro Davidovich; Gaël Monfils	Team World	Taylor Fritz; Frances Tiafoe; Tommy Paul; Félix Auger-Aliassime; Ben Shelton; Francisco Cerúndolo	2–13

== ATP Next Generation finals ==
=== Singles: 1 (runner-up) ===
Result	Date	Tournament	Surface	Opponent	Score
Loss	Dec 2023	Next Generation ATP Finals, Saudi Arabia	Hard (i)	(Serbia) Hamad Medjedovic	4–3^{(8–6)}, 1–4, 2–4, 4–3^{(11–9)}, 1–4

== ATP Challenger Tour finals ==
=== Singles: 3 (2 titles, 1 runner-up) ===
Finals by surface
Hard (1–1)
Clay (1–0)

Result	W–L	Date	Tournament	Tier	Surface	Opponent	Score
Win	1–0	Jan 2023	Oeiras Indoors II, Portugal	Challenger	Hard (i)	(Belgium) Joris De Loore	6–1, 7–6^{(7–4)}
Loss	1–1	Jan 2023	Open Quimper Bretagne, France	Challenger	Hard (i)	(France) Grégoire Barrère	1–6, 4–6
Win	2–1	May 2024	Primrose Bordeaux, France	Challenger	Clay	(Spain) Pedro Martínez	6–2, 6–3

== Wins against top 10 players ==
- Fils has a 12–16 win-loss record against players who were, at the time the match was played, ranked in the top 10.

Season	2021	2022	2023	2024	2025	2026	Total
Wins	0	0	2	3	2	5	12

#	Player	Rk	Event	Surface	Rd	Score	Rk	Ref
2023
1.	(Norway) Casper Ruud	4	Hamburg Open, Germany	Clay	QF	6–0, 6–4	71	
2.	(Greece) Stefanos Tsitsipas	7	European Open, Belgium	Hard (i)	SF	7–6^{(7–5)}, 7–6^{(7–4)}	38	
2024
3.	(Poland) Hubert Hurkacz	7	Wimbledon, United Kingdom	Grass	2R	7–6^{(7–2)}, 6–4, 2–6, 6–6 ret.	34	
4.	(Germany) Alexander Zverev	4	Hamburg Open, Germany	Clay	F	6–3, 3–6, 7–6^{(7–1)}	28	
5.	(United States) Taylor Fritz	7	Japan Open, Japan	Hard	1R	6–4, 3–6, 6–3	24	
2025
6.	(Germany) Alexander Zverev	2	Miami Open, United States	Hard	4R	3–6, 6–3, 6–4	18	
7.	Andrey Rublev	9	Monte-Carlo Masters, France	Clay	3R	6–2, 6–3	15	
2026
8.	(Canada) Félix Auger-Aliassime	9	Indian Wells Open, United States	Hard	4R	6–3, 7–6^{(11–9)}	32	
9.	(Italy) Lorenzo Musetti	9	Barcelona Open, Spain	Clay	QF	6–3, 6–4	30	
10.	(Australia) Alex de Minaur	8	Cincinnati Open, United States	Hard	4R	6–3, 6–4	21	
11.	(Italy) Flavio Cobolli	10	Cincinnati Open, United States	Hard	SF	6–3, 6–4	21	
12.	(United States) Frances Tiafoe	8	Japan Open, Japan	Hard	2R	6–3, 7–5	9	

*As of 2 October 2026

== Junior Grand Slam finals ==
=== Singles: 1 (runner-up) ===
Result	Year	Tournament	Surface	Opponent	Score
Loss	2021	French Open	Clay	(France) Luca Van Assche	4–6, 2–6

=== Doubles: 1 (title) ===
Result	Year	Tournament	Surface	Partner	Opponents	Score
Win	2021	French Open	Clay	(France) Giovanni Mpetshi Perricard	(Belgium) Martin Katz (Ukraine) German Samofalov	7–5, 6–2
