= BNP Paribas Primrose Bordeaux =

Annual tennis tournament in Bordeaux, France

- 2026 BNP Paribas Primrose Bordeaux

ATP Challenger Tour
- Event name: BNP Paribas Primrose Bordeaux
- Location: Bordeaux, France
- Venue: Villa Primrose
- Category: ATP Challenger Tour 175
- Surface: Clay
- Draw: 32S/32Q/16D
- Prize money: €227,270 (2025), 114,800 (2019), 85,000+H (2009)
- Website: Website

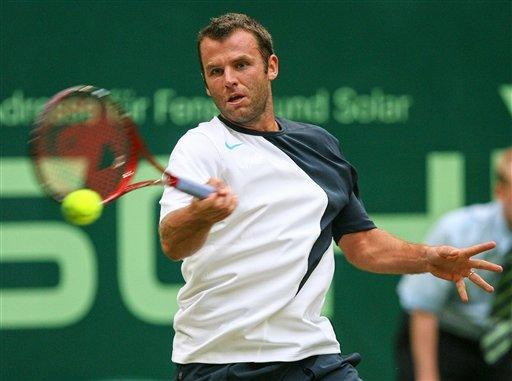
Frenchman Marc Gicquel took the singles titles at the tournament's second and fourth edition, in 2009 and 2011.

The BNP Paribas Primrose Bordeaux is a professional tennis tournament played on outdoor red clay courts. It is currently part of the ATP Challenger Tour 175. It is held annually at the Villa Primrose in Bordeaux, France, since 2008. In 2025 the event was voted “ATP Challenger 175 tournament of the year”.

Marc Gicquel was the only player to win two singles titles (no doubles title similar case so far). Martin Kližan won both singles and double titles the same year.

== Past finals ==
=== Singles ===
Year	Champion	Runner-up	Score
2026	(Argentina) Juan Manuel Cerúndolo	(Belgium) Raphaël Collignon	5–7, 6–1, 7–6^{(7–4)}
2025	(France) Giovanni Mpetshi Perricard	(Georgia (country)) Nikoloz Basilashvili	6–3, 6–7^{(5–7)}, 7–5
2024	(France) Arthur Fils	(Spain) Pedro Martínez	6–2, 6–3
2023	(France) Ugo Humbert	(Argentina) Tomás Martín Etcheverry	7–6^{(7–3)}, 6–4
2022	(Australia) Alexei Popyrin	(France) Quentin Halys	2–6, 7–6^{(7–5)}, 7–6^{(7–4)}
2020–2021	Not held		
2019	(France) Lucas Pouille	(Sweden) Mikael Ymer	6–3, 6–3
2018	(United States) Reilly Opelka	(France) Grégoire Barrère	6–7^{(5–7)}, 6–4, 7–5
2017	(Belgium) Steve Darcis	(Brazil) Rogério Dutra Silva	7–6^{(7–2)}, 4–6, 7–5
2016	(Brazil) Rogério Dutra Silva	(United States) Bjorn Fratangelo	6–3, 6–1
2015	(Australia) Thanasi Kokkinakis	(Netherlands) Thiemo de Bakker	6–4, 1–6, 7–6^{(7–5)}
2014	(France) Julien Benneteau	(United States) Steve Johnson	6–3, 6–2
2013	(France) Gaël Monfils	(France) Michaël Llodra	7–5, 7–6^{(7–5)}
2012	(Slovakia) Martin Kližan	(Russia) Teymuraz Gabashvili	7–5, 6–3
2011	(France) Marc Gicquel (2)	(Argentina) Horacio Zeballos	6–2, 6–4
2010	(France) Richard Gasquet	(France) Michaël Llodra	4–6, 6–1, 6–4
2009	(France) Marc Gicquel (1)	(France) Mathieu Montcourt	3–6, 6–1, 6–4
2008	(Argentina) Eduardo Schwank	(Russia) Igor Kunitsyn	6–2, 6–2

=== Doubles ===
Year	Champions	Runners-up	Score
2026	(Czech Republic) Petr Nouza (Austria) Neil Oberleitner	(France) Arthur Reymond (France) Luca Sanchez	7–6^{(7–3)}, 6–7^{(3–7)}, [10–6]
2025	(Portugal) Francisco Cabral (Austria) Lucas Miedler	(India) Yuki Bhambri (United States) Robert Galloway	7–6^{(7–1)}, 7–6^{(7–2)}
2024	(United Kingdom) Julian Cash (United States) Robert Galloway	(France) Quentin Halys (France) Nicolas Mahut	6–3, 7–6^{(7–2)}
2023	(United Kingdom) Lloyd Glasspool (Finland) Harri Heliövaara	(France) Sadio Doumbia (France) Fabien Reboul	6–4, 6–2
2022	(Brazil) Rafael Matos (Spain) David Vega Hernández	(Monaco) Hugo Nys (Poland) Jan Zieliński	6–4, 6–0
2020–2021	Not held		
2019	(France) Grégoire Barrère (France) Quentin Halys	(Monaco) Romain Arneodo (Monaco) Hugo Nys	6–4, 6–1
2018	(United States) Bradley Klahn (Canada) Peter Polansky	(Argentina) Guillermo Durán (Argentina) Máximo González	6–3, 3–6, [10–7]
2017	(India) Purav Raja (India) Divij Sharan	(Mexico) Santiago González (New Zealand) Artem Sitak	6–4, 6–4
2016	(Sweden) Johan Brunström (Sweden) Andreas Siljeström	(Argentina) Guillermo Durán (Argentina) Máximo González	6–1, 3–6, [10–4]
2015	(Netherlands) Thiemo de Bakker (Netherlands) Robin Haase	(Ukraine) Sergiy Stakhovsky (France) Lucas Pouille	6–3, 7–5
2014	(France) Marc Gicquel (Ukraine) Sergiy Stakhovsky	(United States) Ryan Harrison (United States) Alex Kuznetsov	Walkover
2013	(Germany) Christopher Kas (Austria) Oliver Marach	(United States) Nicholas Monroe (Germany) Simon Stadler	2–6, 6–4, [10–1]
2012	(Slovakia) Martin Kližan (Slovakia) Igor Zelenay	(France) Olivier Charroin (United Kingdom) Jonathan Marray	7–6^{(7–5)}, 4–6, [10–4]
2011	(United Kingdom) Jamie Delgado (United Kingdom) Jonathan Marray	(France) Julien Benneteau (France) Nicolas Mahut	7–5, 6–3
2010	(France) Nicolas Mahut (France) Édouard Roger-Vasselin	(Slovakia) Karol Beck (Czech Republic) Leoš Friedl	5–7, 6–3, [10–7]
2009	(Uruguay) Pablo Cuevas (Argentina) Horacio Zeballos	(France) Xavier Pujo (France) Stéphane Robert	4–6, 6–4, 10–4
2008	(Argentina) Diego Hartfield (Argentina) Sergio Roitman	(Poland) Tomasz Bednarek (Serbia) Dušan Vemić	6–4, 6–4
