= Lorenzo Musetti career statistics =

Career finals
Discipline	Type	Won	Lost	Total	WR^{1}
Singles	Grand Slam	–	–	–	–
Singles	ATP Finals	–	–	–	–
Singles	ATP 1000	0	1	1	0.00
Singles	ATP 500	1	1	2	0.50
Singles	ATP 250	2	5	7	0.29
Singles	Olympic Games	–	–	–	–
Singles	Total	3	7	10	0.30
Doubles	Grand Slam	–	–	–	–
Doubles	ATP Finals	–	–	–	–
Doubles	ATP 1000	0	1	1	0.00
Doubles	ATP 500	–	–	–	–
Doubles	ATP 250	1	1	2	0.50
Doubles	Olympic Games	–	–	–	–
Doubles	Total	1	2	3	0.33
^{1)} WR = Winning Rate

These are the career statistics for Italian tennis player Lorenzo Musetti. All information is according to the ATP.

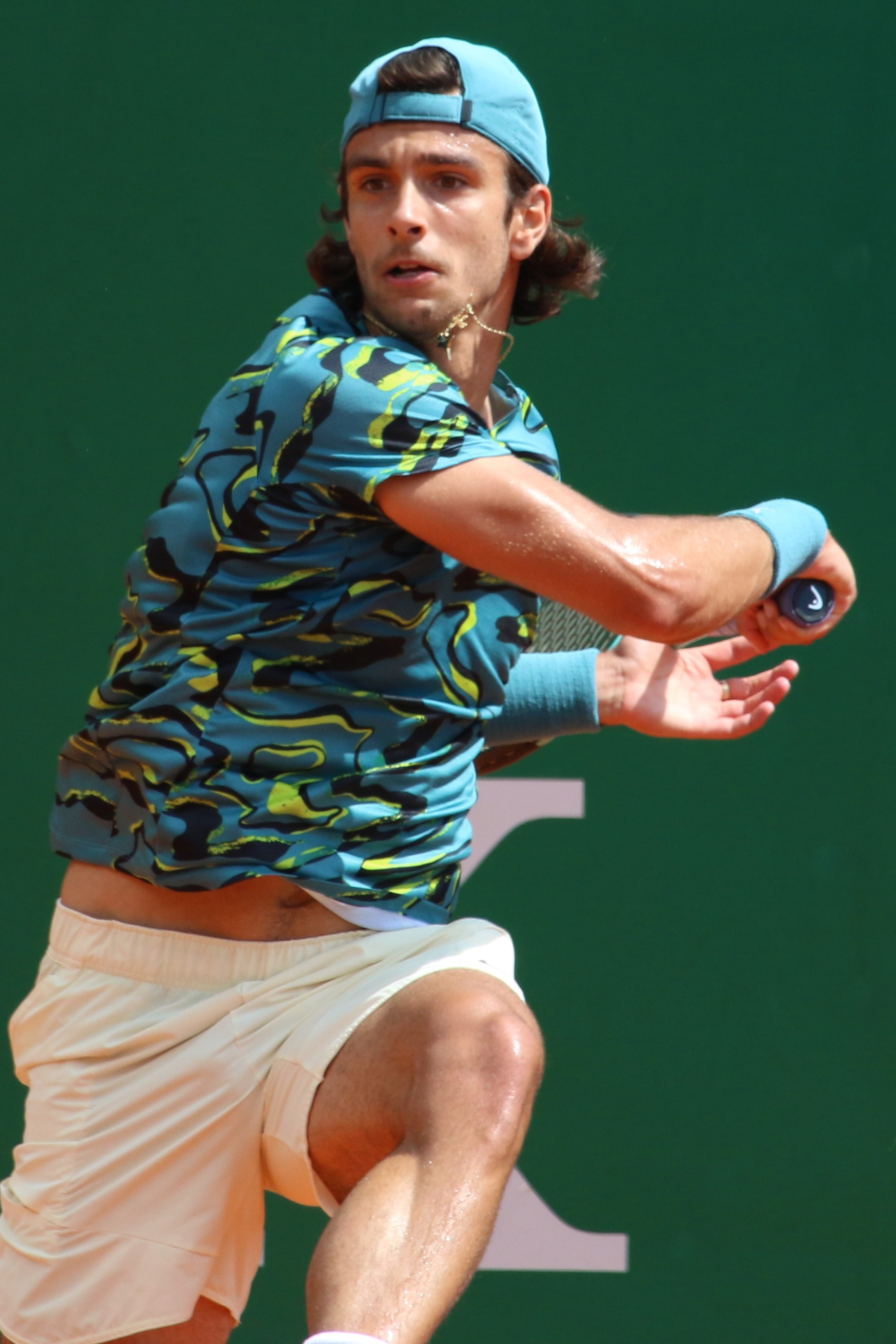
Musetti at the 2023 Monte-Carlo Masters.

== Performance timeline ==
Key
W	F	SF	QF	#R	RR	Q#	P#	DNQ	A	Z#	PO	G	S	B	NMS	NTI	P	NH

(W) winner; (F) finalist; (SF) semifinalist; (QF) quarterfinalist; (#R) rounds 4, 3, 2, 1; (RR) round-robin stage; (Q#) qualification round; (P#) preliminary round; (DNQ) did not qualify; (A) absent; (Z#) Davis/Fed Cup Zonal Group (with number indication) or (PO) play-off; (G) gold, (S) silver or (B) bronze Olympic/Paralympic medal; (NMS) not a Masters tournament; (NTI) not a Tier I tournament; (P) postponed; (NH) not held; (SR) strike rate (events won / competed); (W–L) win–loss record.
To avoid confusion and double counting, these charts are updated at the conclusion of a tournament or when the player's participation has ended.

=== Singles ===
Tournament	2019	2020	2021	2022	2023	2024	2025	2026	SR	W–L	Win %
Grand Slam tournaments
Australian Open	A	Q3	Q1	1R	1R	2R	3R	QF	0 / 5	7–5	58%
French Open	A	A	4R	1R	4R	3R	SF	A	0 / 5	13–5	72%
Wimbledon	A	NH	1R	1R	3R	SF	1R	A	0 / 5	7–5	58%
US Open	A	A	2R	3R	1R	3R	QF	2R	0 / 6	10–6	63%
Win–loss	0–0	0–0	4–3	2–4	5–4	10–4	11–4	5–2	0 / 21	37–21	64%
Year-end championships
ATP Finals	Did not qualify						RR		0 / 1	1–2	33%
National representation
Summer Olympics	NH		1R	NH		B	NH		0 / 2	5–2	71%
Davis Cup	A	QF		SF	W	W	A		2 / 4	2–5	29%
ATP 1000 tournaments
Indian Wells Open	A	NH	1R	2R	2R	3R	3R	2R	0 / 6	3–6	33%
Miami Open	A	NH	3R	1R	2R	4R	4R	A	0 / 5	6–5	55%
Monte-Carlo Masters	A	NH	1R	3R	QF	3R	F	2R	0 / 6	12–6	67%
Madrid Open	A	NH	Q2	3R	2R	2R	SF	4R	0 / 5	8–5	62%
Italian Open	Q1	3R	2R	A	4R	2R	SF	4R	0 / 6	11–6	65%
Canadian Open	A	NH	A	A	3R	A	3R	3R	0 / 3	4–3	57%
Cincinnati Open	A	A	Q1	1R	2R	2R	2R	QF	0 / 5	5–5	50%
Shanghai Masters	A	NH			2R	2R	4R	2R	0 / 4	2–4	33%
Paris Masters	A	A	2R	QF	1R	1R	2R	2R	0 / 6	6–6	50%
Win–loss	0–0	2–1	4–5	8–6	8–9	6–8	19–9	10–8	0 / 46	57–46	55%
Career statistics
	2019	2020	2021	2022	2023	2024	2025	2026	Career		
Tournaments	0	3	20	28	27	27	22	13	Career total: 139		
Titles	0	0	0	2	0	0	0	1	Career total: 3		
Finals	0	0	0	2	0	3	3	2	Career total: 10		
Overall win–loss	0–0	5–3	21–22	34–29	32–29	40–28	45–22	25–12	202–145		
Win %	–	63%	49%	54%	52%	59%	67%	68%	58%		
Year-end ranking	361	128	59	23	27	17	8		$15,790,083		

=== Doubles ===
Tournament	2020	2021	2022	2023	2024	2025	SR	W–L	Win %
Grand Slam tournaments
Australian Open	A	A	1R	A	A	A	0 / 1	0–1	0%
French Open	A	1R	A	A	A	A	0 / 1	0–1	0%
Wimbledon	NH	A	1R	A	A	A	0 / 1	0–1	0%
US Open	A	A	1R	A	A	A	0 / 1	0–1	0%
Win–loss	0–0	0–1	0–3	0–0	0–0	0–0	0 / 4	0–4	0%
ATP 1000 tournaments
Indian Wells Open	NH	A	A	A	2R	A	0 / 1	1–1	50%
Monte-Carlo Masters	NH	A	A	1R	1R	A	0 / 2	0–2	0%
Madrid Open	NH	A	A	A	A	2R	0 / 1	1–1	50%
Italian Open	A	2R	A	1R	A	2R	0 / 3	2–2	50%
Canadian Open	NH	A	A	A	A	1R	0 / 1	0–1	0%
Cincinnati Open	A	A	A	QF	A	F	0 / 2	5–2	71%
Paris Masters	A	A	A	1R	A	A	0 / 1	0–1	0%
Win–loss	0–0	1–1	0–0	2–4	1–2	5–3	0 / 11	9–10	47%
Career statistics
	2020	2021	2022	2023	2024	2025	Career		
Tournaments	1	7	9	5	6	5	Career total: 33		
Titles	0	0	0	0	0	0	Career total: 0		
Finals	0	0	0	0	1	1	Career total: 2		
Overall win–loss	0–1	4–6	3–7	4–6	5–6	5–4	21–30		
Win %	0%	40%	30%	40%	45%	56%	41%		
Year-end ranking	675	367	570	276	181				

== Significant finals ==
=== Summer Olympics ===
==== Singles: 1 (bronze medal) ====
Result	Year	Tournament	Surface	Opponent	Score
Bronze	2024	Paris Olympics, France	Clay	(Canada) Félix Auger-Aliassime	6–4, 1–6, 6–3

=== ATP 1000 tournaments ===
==== Singles: 1 (runner-up) ====
Result	Year	Tournament	Surface	Opponent	Score
Loss	2025	Monte-Carlo Masters	Clay	(Spain) Carlos Alcaraz	6–3, 1–6, 0–6

==== Doubles: 1 (runner-up) ====
Result	Year	Tournament	Surface	Partner	Opponents	Score
Loss	2025	Cincinnati Open	Hard	(Italy) Lorenzo Sonego	(Croatia) Nikola Mektić (United States) Rajeev Ram	6–4, 3–6, [5–10]

== ATP Tour finals ==
=== Singles: 10 (3 titles, 7 runner-ups) ===
Legend Grand Slam (–) ATP 1000 (0–1) ATP 500 (1–1) ATP 250 (2–5)	Finals by surface Hard (2–4) Clay (1–2) Grass (0–1)	Finals by setting Outdoor (2–6) Indoor (1–1)

Result	W–L	Date	Tournament	Tier	Surface	Opponent	Score
Win	1–0	Jul 2022	Hamburg European Open, Germany	ATP 500	Clay	(Spain) Carlos Alcaraz	6–4, 6–7^{(6–8)}, 6–4
Win	2–0	Oct 2022	Tennis Napoli Cup, Italy	ATP 250	Hard	(Italy) Matteo Berrettini	7–6^{(7–5)}, 6–2
Loss	2–1	Jun 2024	Queen's Club Championships, United Kingdom	ATP 500	Grass	(United States) Tommy Paul	1–6, 6–7^{(8–10)}
Loss	2–2	Jul 2024	Croatia Open, Croatia	ATP 250	Clay	(Argentina) Francisco Cerúndolo	6–2, 4–6, 6–7^{(5–7)}
Loss	2–3	Sep 2024	Chengdu Open, China	ATP 250	Hard	(China) Shang Juncheng	6–7^{(4–7)}, 1–6
Loss	2–4	Apr 2025	Monte-Carlo Masters, France	ATP 1000	Clay	(Spain) Carlos Alcaraz	6–3, 1–6, 0–6
Loss	2–5	Sep 2025	Chengdu Open, China	ATP 250	Hard	(Chile) Alejandro Tabilo	3–6, 6–2, 6–7^{(5–7)}
Loss	2–6	Nov 2025	Hellenic Championship, Greece	ATP 250	Hard (i)	(Serbia) Novak Djokovic	6–4, 3–6, 5–7
Loss	2–7	Jan 2026	Hong Kong Open, China SAR	ATP 250	Hard	(Kazakhstan) Alexander Bublik	6–7^{(2–7)}, 3–6
Win	3–7	Oct 2026	Lyon Open, France	ATP 250	Hard (i)	(United States) Taylor Fritz	6–3, 6–4

=== Doubles: 3 (1 title, 2 runner-ups) ===
Legend Grand Slam (–) ATP 1000 (0–1) ATP 500 (–) ATP 250 (1–1)	Finals by surface Hard (1–2) Clay (–) Grass (–)	Finals by setting Outdoor (1–2) Indoor (–)

Result	W–L	Date	Tournament	Tier	Surface	Partner	Opponents	Score
Loss	0–1	Feb 2024	Qatar Open, Qatar	ATP 250	Hard	(Italy) Lorenzo Sonego	(United Kingdom) Jamie Murray (New Zealand) Michael Venus	6–7^{(0–7)}, 6–2, [8–10]
Loss	0–2	Aug 2025	Cincinnati Open, United States	ATP 1000	Hard	(Italy) Lorenzo Sonego	(Croatia) Nikola Mektić (United States) Rajeev Ram	6–4, 3–6, [5–10]
Win	1–2	Jan 2026	Hong Kong Open, China SAR	ATP 250	Hard	(Italy) Lorenzo Sonego	Karen Khachanov; Andrey Rublev	6–4, 2–6, [10–1]

== ATP Challenger Tour finals ==
=== Singles: 6 (2 titles, 4 runner-ups) ===
Finals by surface
Hard (0–1)
Clay (2–3)

Result	W–L	Date	Tournament	Surface	Opponent	Score
Win	1–0	Sep 2020	Forlì International, Italy	Clay	(Brazil) Thiago Monteiro	7–6^{(7–2)}, 7–6^{(7–5)}
Loss	1–1	Jan 2021	Antalya Challenger, Turkey	Clay	(Spain) Jaume Munar	7–6^{(9–7)}, 2–6, 2–6
Loss	1–2	Feb 2021	Biella Challenger, Italy	Hard (i)	(South Korea) Soon-woo Kwon	2–6, 3–6
Win	2–2	Jun 2022	Forlì Open, Italy	Clay	(Italy) Francesco Passaro	2–6, 6–3, 6–2
Loss	2–3	May 2024	Cagliari Open, Italy	Clay	(Argentina) Mariano Navone	5–7, 1–6
Loss	2–4	May 2024	Piemonte Open, Italy	Clay	(Italy) Francesco Passaro	3–6, 5–7

== ITF World Tennis Tour finals ==
=== Singles: 2 (2 titles) ===
Result	W–L	Date	Tournament	Surface	Opponent	Score
Win	1–0	Oct 2019	M15 Antalya, Turkey	Clay	(Hungary) Fábián Marozsán	7–5, 6–2
Win	2–0	Oct 2019	M15 Antalya, Turkey	Clay	(Russia) Ronald Slobodchikov	6–4, 6–1

== Junior Grand Slam finals ==
=== Singles: 2 (1 title, 1 runner-up) ===
Result	Year	Tournament	Surface	Opponent	Score
Loss	2018	US Open	Hard	(Brazil) Thiago Seyboth Wild	1–6, 6–2, 2–6
Win	2019	Australian Open	Hard	(United States) Emilio Nava	4–6, 6–2, 7–6^{(14–12)}

== Career Grand Slam tournament statistics ==
=== Career Grand Slam tournament seedings ===
Year	Australian Open	French Open	Wimbledon	US Open
2020	did not qualify	did not play	tournament cancelled*	did not play
2021	did not qualify	not seeded	not seeded	not seeded
2022	not seeded	not seeded	not seeded	26th
2023	17th	17th	14th	18th
2024	25th	30th	25th	18th
2025	16th	8th	7th	10th
2026	5th	did not play	did not play	

* Due to the COVID-19 pandemic, the 2020 Wimbledon Championships of the tournament was cancelled.

=== Best Grand Slam results details ===
Australian Open
2026 Australian Open (5th seed)
Round	Opponent	Rank	Score
1R	(Belgium) Raphaël Collignon	72	4–6, 7–6^{(7–3)}, 7–5, 3–2 ret.
2R	(Italy) Lorenzo Sonego	40	6–3, 6–3, 6–4
3R	(Czech Republic) Tomáš Macháč	24	5–7, 6–4, 6–2, 5–7, 6–2
4R	(United States) Taylor Fritz (9)	9	6–2, 7–5, 6–4
QF	(Serbia) Novak Djokovic (4)	4	6–4, 6–3, 1–3 ret.

French Open
2025 French Open (8th seed)
Round	Opponent	Rank	Score
1R	(Germany) Yannick Hanfmann (Q)	142	7–5, 6–2, 6–0
2R	(Colombia) Daniel Elahi Galán (LL)	122	6–4, 6–0, 6–4
3R	(Argentina) Mariano Navone	97	4–6, 6–4, 6–3, 6–2
4R	(Denmark) Holger Rune (10)	10	7–5, 3–6, 6–3, 6–2
QF	(United States) Frances Tiafoe (15)	16	6–2, 4–6, 7–5, 6–2
SF	(Spain) Carlos Alcaraz (2)	2	6–4, 6–7^{(3–7)}, 0–6, 0–2 ret.

Wimbledon Championships
2024 Wimbledon (25th seed)
Round	Opponent	Rank	Score
1R	(France) Constant Lestienne	92	4–6, 7–6^{(7–4)}, 6–2, 6–2
2R	(Italy) Luciano Darderi	37	6–4, 4–6, 6–7^{(5–7)}, 6–4, 6–4
3R	(Argentina) Francisco Comesaña	122	6–2, 6–7^{(4–7)}, 7–6^{(7–3)}, 6–3
4R	(France) Giovanni Mpetshi Perricard (LL)	58	4–6, 6–3, 6–3, 6–2
QF	(United States) Taylor Fritz (13)	12	3–6, 7–6^{(7–5)}, 6–2, 3–6, 6–1
SF	(Serbia) Novak Djokovic (2)	2	4–6, 6–7^{(2–7)}, 4–6

US Open
2025 US Open (10th seed)
Round	Opponent	Rank	Score
1R	(France) Giovanni Mpetshi Perricard	37	6–7^{(3–7)}, 6–3, 6–4, 6–4
2R	(Belgium) David Goffin	80	6–4, 6–0, 6–2
3R	(Italy) Flavio Cobolli (24)	26	6–3, 6–2, 2–0 ret.
4R	(Spain) Jaume Munar	44	6–3, 6–0, 6–1
QF	(Italy) Jannik Sinner (1)	1	1–6, 4–6, 2–6

== Wins over top 10 players ==
- Musetti has a 17–35 record against players who were, at the time the match was played, ranked in the top 10.

Season	2019	2020	2021	2022	2023	2024	2025	2026	Total
Wins	0	0	1	3	1	3	6	4	18

#	Player	Rk	Event	Surface	Rd	Score	LMR	Ref
2021
1.	(Argentina) Diego Schwartzman	9	Mexican Open, Mexico	Hard	1R	6–3, 2–6, 6–4	120	
2022
2.	(Canada) Félix Auger-Aliassime	9	Monte-Carlo Masters, France	Clay	2R	6–2, 7–6^{(7–2)}	83	
3.	(Spain) Carlos Alcaraz	6	Hamburg Open, Germany	Clay	F	6–4, 6–7^{(6–8)}, 6–4	62	
4.	(Norway) Casper Ruud	4	Paris Masters, France	Hard (i)	3R	4–6, 6–4, 6–4	23	
2023
5.	(Serbia) Novak Djokovic	1	Monte-Carlo Masters, France	Clay	3R	4–6, 7–5, 6–4	21	
2024
6.	(Australia) Alex de Minaur	7	Queen's Club, United Kingdom	Grass	1R	1–6, 6–4, 6–2	30	
7.	(Germany) Alexander Zverev	4	Paris Olympics, France	Clay	QF	7–5, 7–5	16	
8.	(Germany) Alexander Zverev	3	Vienna Open, Austria	Hard (i)	QF	2–6, 7–6^{(7–5)}, 6–4	17	
2025
9.	(Greece) Stefanos Tsitsipas	8	Monte-Carlo Masters, France	Clay	QF	1–6, 6–3, 6–4	16	
10.	(Australia) Alex de Minaur	10	Monte-Carlo Masters, France	Clay	SF	1–6, 6–4, 7–6^{(7–4)}	16	
11.	(Australia) Alex de Minaur	7	Madrid Open, Spain	Clay	4R	6–4, 6–2	11	
12.	(Germany) Alexander Zverev	2	Italian Open, Italy	Clay	QF	7–6^{(7–1)}, 6–4	9	
13.	(Denmark) Holger Rune	10	French Open, France	Clay	4R	7–5, 3–6, 6–3, 6–2	7	
14.	(Australia) Alex de Minaur	7	ATP Finals, Italy	Hard (i)	RR	7–5, 3–6, 7–5	9	
2026
15.	(United States) Taylor Fritz	9	Australian Open, Australia	Hard	4R	6–2, 7–5, 6–4	5	
16.	(Italy) Flavio Cobolli	6	Lyon Open, France	Hard (i)	SF	4–6, 6–2, 7–5	26	
17.	(United States) Frances Tiafoe	9	Vienna Open, Austria	Hard (i)	1R	7–6 ^{(8–6)}, 7–5	26	
18.	(Germany) Alexander Zverev	1	Paris Masters, France	Hard (i)	2R	7–6^{(7–5)}, 6–2	24	

== National and international representation ==
=== Team competitions finals: 3 (2 titles, 1 runner-up) ===
Finals by tournament Davis Cup (2–0) United Cup (0–1)	Finals by team Italy (2–1)

Result	W–L	Date	Tournament	Surface	Team	Partner(s)	Opponent team	Opponent(s)	Score
Loss	0–1	Jan 2023	United Cup, Sydney	Hard	Italy	Matteo Berrettini; Martina Trevisan; Lucia Bronzetti	United States	Taylor Fritz; Jessica Pegula; Frances Tiafoe; Madison Keys	0–4
Win	1–1	Nov 2023	Davis Cup, Málaga	Hard (i)	Italy	Jannik Sinner; Matteo Arnaldi; Lorenzo Sonego; Simone Bolelli	Australia	Alex de Minaur; Alexei Popyrin; Max Purcell; Jordan Thompson; Matthew Ebden	2–0
Win	2–1	Nov 2024	Davis Cup, Málaga	Hard (i)	Italy	Jannik Sinner; Matteo Berrettini; Andrea Vavassori; Simone Bolelli	Netherlands	Tallon Griekspoor; Botic van de Zandschulp; Jesper de Jong; Wesley Koolhof	2–0

=== Summer Olympics: 10 (6 wins – 4 losses) ===
Matches by tournament 2020 Tokyo Olympics (1–2) 2024 Paris Olympics (5–2)	Olympic medals: 1 Bronze medals: 1	Matches by medal finals Bronze medal finals (1–0)	Matches by type Singles (5–2) Doubles (1–2)	Matches by surface Hard (1–2) Clay (5–2)	Matches by setting Outdoors (6–4)

==== Singles: 7 (5–2, 1 bronze medal) ====
Result	W–L	Year	Surface	Opponent	Rd	Score
Loss	0–1	2020	Hard	John Millman (AUS)	1R	3–6, 4–6
Win	1–1	2024	Clay	Gaël Monfils (FRA)	1R	6–1, 6–4
Win	2–1	2024	Clay	Mariano Navone (ARG)	2R	7–6^{(7–2)}, 6–3
Win	3–1	2024	Clay	Taylor Fritz (USA) (7)	3R	6–4, 7–5
Win	4–1	2024	Clay	Alexander Zverev (GER) (3)	QF	7–5, 7–5
Loss	4–2	2024	Clay	Novak Djokovic (SRB) (1)	SF	4–6, 2–6
Win	5–2	2024	Clay	Félix Auger-Aliassime (CAN) (13)	BM	6–4, 1–6, 6–3

==== Doubles: 3 (1–2) ====
Result	W–L	Year	Surface	Partner	Opponent	Rd	Score
Win	1–0	2020	Hard	Lorenzo Sonego	Pablo Andújar / Roberto Carballés Baena (ESP)	1R	7–5, 6–4
Loss	1–1	2020	Hard	Lorenzo Sonego	Nikola Mektić / Mate Pavić (CRO) (1)	2R	5–7, 7–6^{(7–5)}, [7–10]
Loss	1–2	2024	Clay	Luciano Darderi	Nicolás Jarry / Alejandro Tabilo (CHI)	1R	3–6, 7–6^{(7–5)}, [5–10]

=== United Cup (5–2) ===
Matches by type
Singles (4–1)
Mixed doubles (1–1)

Result	No.	Rubber	Match type (partner if any)	Opponent nation	Opponent player(s)	Score
▲8–2; 29 December 2022 – 3 January 2023; Pat Rafter Arena, Brisbane, Australia; group stage; hard surface
Win	1	II	Singles	Brazil	Felipe Meligeni Alves	6–3, 6–4
Win	2	II	Singles	Norway	Viktor Durasovic	7–6^{(9–7)}, 6–3
Win	3	V	Mixed doubles (w/ Camilla Rosatello)	Norway	Ulrikke Eikeri / Viktor Durasovic	7–6^{(8–6)}, 6–2
▼2–3; 4 January 2023; Pat Rafter Arena, Brisbane, Australia; host city finals stage; hard surface
Win	4	I	Singles	Poland	Daniel Michalski	6–1, 6–1
Loss	5	V	Mixed doubles (w/ Camilla Rosatello)	Poland	Iga Świątek / Hubert Hurkacz	1–6, 2–6
▼4–5; 6–8 January 2023; Ken Rosewall Arena, Sydney, Australia; knockout stage; hard surface
Win	6	II	Singles	Greece	Stefanos Sakellaridis	6–1, 6–1
Loss	7	II	Singles	United States	Frances Tiafoe	2–6, 0–0 ret.
