= 2025 Italian Open – Men's singles =

Men's singles
- 2025 Italian Open

Final
- Champion: (Spain) Carlos Alcaraz
- Runner-up: (Italy) Jannik Sinner
- Score: 7–6^{(7–5)}, 6–1

Details
- Draw: 96 (12Q, 8WC)
- Seeds: 32

Events
Singles	men	women
Doubles	men	women
- Italian Open

Carlos Alcaraz defeated Jannik Sinner in the final, 7–6^{(7–5)}, 6–1 to win the men's singles tennis title at the 2025 Italian Open. It was his seventh ATP Masters 1000 title and 19th ATP Tour–level title overall. Alcaraz became the second-youngest man, after Rafael Nadal, to reach the quarterfinals of all nine ATP Masters 1000 events.

Alexander Zverev was the defending champion, but lost in the quarterfinals to Lorenzo Musetti.

This tournament marked world No. 1 Sinner's first professional appearance since the 2025 Australian Open, having served a three-month suspension after reaching a case resolution agreement with the World Anti-Doping Agency. Sinner was the first Italian man to reach the final since Adriano Panatta in 1978. His loss ended a 26-match winning streak, dating to the 2024 Shanghai Masters.

== Seeds ==
All seeds received a bye into the second round.

1. (Italy) Jannik Sinner (final)
2. (Germany) Alexander Zverev (quarterfinals)
3. (Spain) Carlos Alcaraz (champion)
4. (United States) Taylor Fritz (second round)
5. (United Kingdom) Jack Draper (quarterfinals)
6. (Norway) Casper Ruud (quarterfinals)
7. (Australia) Alex de Minaur (fourth round)
8. (Italy) Lorenzo Musetti (semifinals)
9. (Denmark) Holger Rune (third round)
10. Daniil Medvedev (fourth round)
11. (United States) Tommy Paul (semifinals)
12. (United States) Ben Shelton (second round)
13. (France) Arthur Fils (fourth round)
14. (Bulgaria) Grigor Dimitrov (second round)
15. (United States) Frances Tiafoe (second round)
16. Andrey Rublev (second round)
17. (Argentina) Francisco Cerúndolo (fourth round)
18. (Greece) Stefanos Tsitsipas (third round)
19. (Czech Republic) Tomáš Macháč (third round)
20. (Czech Republic) Jakub Menšík (fourth round)
21. (France) Ugo Humbert (second round, retired)
22. (United States) Sebastian Korda (third round)
23. Karen Khachanov (fourth round)
24. (Australia) Alexei Popyrin (third round)
25. (Spain) Alejandro Davidovich Fokina (second round)
26. (Canada) Félix Auger-Aliassime (withdrew)
27. (Canada) Denis Shapovalov (second round)
28. (United States) Brandon Nakashima (third round)
29. (Italy) Matteo Berrettini (third round, retired)
30. (Poland) Hubert Hurkacz (quarterfinals)
31. (United States) Alex Michelsen (second round)
32. (Argentina) Sebastián Báez (second round)

Click on the seed number of a player to go to their draw section.

== Draw ==
Key

- Q = Qualifier
- WC = Wild card
- LL = Lucky loser
- Alt = Alternate
- ITF = ITF entry
- PR = Protected ranking
- SR = Special ranking
- SE = Special exempt
- JE = Junior exempt
- JR = Junior Accelerator Programme entrant
- CO = College Accelerator Programme entrant
- NG = Next Gen Accelerator Program entrant
- w/o = Walkover
- r = Retired
- d = Defaulted

=== Finals ===
Quarterfinals
1	(Italy) Jannik Sinner	6	6
6	(Norway) Casper Ruud	0	1
30	(Poland) Hubert Hurkacz	6^{4}	3
11	(United States) Tommy Paul	7^{7}	6
5	(United Kingdom) Jack Draper	4	4
3	(Spain) Carlos Alcaraz	6	6
8	(Italy) Lorenzo Musetti	7^{7}	6
2	(Germany) Alexander Zverev	6^{1}	4

Semifinals
1	(Italy) Jannik Sinner	1	6	6
11	(United States) Tommy Paul	6	0	3
3	(Spain) Carlos Alcaraz	6	7^{7}
8	(Italy) Lorenzo Musetti	3	6^{4}

Final
1	(Italy) Jannik Sinner	6^{5}	1
3	(Spain) Carlos Alcaraz	7^{7}	6

=== Top half ===
==== Section 1 ====
First round
(Argentina) M Navone	6	6
WC	(Italy) F Cinà	3	3
LL	(Netherlands) J de Jong	6	6
Q	(Kazakhstan) A Shevchenko	2	4
(France) H Gaston	6^{4}	4
(Chile) N Jarry	7^{7}	6
(Spain) R Carballés Baena	3	0^{r}
Q	(Austria) S Ofner	6	0

Second round
1	(Italy) J Sinner	6	6
(Argentina) M Navone	3	4
LL	(Netherlands) J de Jong	6	6
25	(Spain) A Davidovich Fokina	0	2
17	(Argentina) F Cerúndolo	7^{7}	6
(Chile) N Jarry	6^{4}	3
Q	(Austria) S Ofner	6	6^{2}	6
15	(United States) F Tiafoe	2	7^{7}	3

Third round
1	(Italy) J Sinner	6	6
LL	(Netherlands) J de Jong	4	2
17	(Argentina) F Cerúndolo	6	6
Q	(Austria) S Ofner	2	4

Fourth round
1	(Italy) J Sinner	7^{7}	6
17	(Argentina) F Cerúndolo	6^{2}	3

==== Section 2 ====
First round
Q	(Chile) T Barrios Vera	6	2	5
(Spain) J Munar	4	6	7
(Australia) A Vukic	7^{7}	6
Q	(United States) N Moreno de Alboran	6^{2}	2
(United Kingdom) J Fearnley	6	6
WC	(Italy) F Fognini	2	3
(Kazakhstan) A Bublik	6	7^{7}
R Safiullin	3	6^{4}

Second round
12	(United States) B Shelton	2	1
(Spain) J Munar	6	6
(Australia) A Vukic	3	4
22	(United States) S Korda	6	6
29	(Italy) M Berrettini	6	7^{7}
(United Kingdom) J Fearnley	4	6^{0}
(Kazakhstan) A Bublik	4	6	3
6	(Norway) C Ruud	6	4	6

Third round
(Spain) J Munar	6	6
22	(United States) S Korda	4	2
29	(Italy) M Berrettini	5	0^{r}
6	(Norway) C Ruud	7	2

Fourth round
(Spain) J Munar	3	4
6	(Norway) C Ruud	6	6

==== Section 3 ====
First round
(Canada) G Diallo	6	3	4
(United States) M Giron	3	6	6
(Italy) M Bellucci	4	2
(Spain) P Martínez	6	6
(France) A Rinderknech	6^{4}	6^{4}
WC	(Italy) M Gigante	7^{7}	7^{7}
(Hungary) F Marozsán	6	7^{7}
(Brazil) J Fonseca	3	6^{4}

Second round
4	(United States) T Fritz	6^{4}	6^{3}
(United States) M Giron	7^{7}	7^{7}
(Spain) P Martínez	1	5
30	(Poland) H Hurkacz	6	7
20	(Czech Republic) J Menšík	7^{7}	7
WC	(Italy) M Gigante	6^{4}	5
(Hungary) F Marozsán	7	4	6
16	A Rublev	5	6	3

Third round
(United States) M Giron	3	6	1
30	(Poland) H Hurkacz	6	1	6
20	(Czech Republic) J Menšík	6	7^{7}
(Hungary) F Marozsán	4	6^{2}

Fourth round
30	(Poland) H Hurkacz	7^{7}	4	7^{7}
20	(Czech Republic) J Menšík	6^{5}	6	6^{5}

==== Section 4 ====
First round
(Italy) M Arnaldi	4	3
(Spain) R Bautista Agut	6	6
(United States) L Tien	6	7^{13}
PR	(United States) R Opelka	4	6^{11}
(Portugal) N Borges	1	6	4
Q	(Brazil) T Seyboth Wild	6	4	6
WC	(Italy) L Nardi	6	6
(Italy) F Cobolli	3	4

Second round
11	(United States) T Paul	6	6
(Spain) R Bautista Agut	1	4
(United States) L Tien	4	4
19	(Czech Republic) T Macháč	6	6
LL	(Bolivia) H Dellien	4	6	6
Q	(Brazil) T Seyboth Wild	6	3	4
WC	(Italy) L Nardi	4	5
7	(Australia) A de Minaur	6	7

Third round
11	(United States) T Paul	6	6^{5}	6
19	(Czech Republic) T Macháč	3	7^{7}	4
LL	(Bolivia) H Dellien	4	4
7	(Australia) A de Minaur	6	6

Fourth round
11	(United States) T Paul	7	6
7	(Australia) A de Minaur	5	3

=== Bottom half ===
==== Section 5 ====
First round
(China) Y Bu	6^{4}	3
(Italy) L Darderi	7^{7}	6
Q	(Czech Republic) V Kopřiva	6	6
(France) Q Halys	4	3
(Australia) R Hijikata	6	1	5
(France) C Moutet	3	6	7
(Germany) D Altmaier	1	5
(Argentina) F Comesaña	6	7

Second round
5	(United Kingdom) J Draper	6	6
(Italy) L Darderi	1	4
Q	(Czech Republic) V Kopřiva	3	6	6
32	(Argentina) S Báez	6	4	4
21	(France) U Humbert	3	0^{r}
(France) C Moutet	6	4
(Argentina) F Comesaña	6	3	4
9	(Denmark) H Rune	3	6	6

Third round
5	(United Kingdom) J Draper	6	6
Q	(Czech Republic) V Kopřiva	4	3
(France) C Moutet	7	5	7^{7}
9	(Denmark) H Rune	5	7	6^{4}

Fourth round
5	(United Kingdom) J Draper	1	6	6
(France) C Moutet	6	4	3

==== Section 6 ====
First round
WC	(Italy) F Passaro	6	2	6
Q	(Chinese Taipei) C-h Tseng	0	6	3
(Italy) L Sonego	2	3
Q	(Argentina) RA Burruchaga	6	6
(Serbia) L Djere	6	6
(Argentina) TM Etcheverry	3	2
(Japan) Y Nishioka	5	1
Q	(Serbia) D Lajović	7	6

Second round
14	(Bulgaria) G Dimitrov	5	3
WC	(Italy) F Passaro	7	6
Q	(Argentina) RA Burruchaga	4	7	1
23	K Khachanov	6	5	6
31	(United States) A Michelsen	0	3
(Serbia) L Djere	6	6
Q	(Serbia) D Lajović	3	3
3	(Spain) C Alcaraz	6	6

Third round
WC	(Italy) F Passaro	3	0
23	K Khachanov	6	6
(Serbia) L Djere	6^{2}	2
3	(Spain) C Alcaraz	7^{7}	6

Fourth round
23	K Khachanov	3	6	5
3	(Spain) C Alcaraz	6	3	7

==== Section 7 ====
First round
(Serbia) H Medjedovic	4	4
Q	(Finland) O Virtanen	6	6
(Australia) J Thompson	3	6	7^{7}
(France) G Mpetshi Perricard	6	3	6^{5}
Q	(Spain) C Taberner	6	1	7
(United States) A Kovacevic	3	6	5
(Australia) C O'Connell	3	2
LL	(United Kingdom) C Norrie	6	6

Second round
8	(Italy) L Musetti	6	6
Q	(Finland) O Virtanen	3	2
(Australia) J Thompson
28	(United States) B Nakashima	w/o
24	(Australia) A Popyrin	6	7^{7}
Q	(Spain) C Taberner	1	6^{4}
LL	(United Kingdom) C Norrie	4	2
10	D Medvedev	6	6

Third round
8	(Italy) L Musetti	6	6
28	(United States) B Nakashima	4	3
24	(Australia) A Popyrin	4	1
10	D Medvedev	6	6

Fourth round
8	(Italy) L Musetti	7	6
10	D Medvedev	5	4

==== Section 8 ====
First round
(Netherlands) T Griekspoor	4	6	6
(Serbia) M Kecmanović	6	3	0
(Czech Republic) J Lehečka	6	3	6^{5}
(France) A Müller	2	6	7^{7}
Q	(Lithuania) V Gaubas	7^{7}	2	6
(Bosnia and Herzegovina) D Džumhur	6^{3}	6	4
(Argentina) C Ugo Carabelli	6	1	6
LL	(Spain) P Carreño Busta	2	6	3

Second round
13	(France) A Fils	6	6
(Netherlands) T Griekspoor	2	2
(France) A Müller	2	6^{3}
18	(Greece) S Tsitsipas	6	7^{7}
27	(Canada) D Shapovalov	3	4
Q	(Lithuania) V Gaubas	6	6
(Argentina) C Ugo Carabelli	2	1
2	(Germany) A Zverev	6	6

Third round
13	(France) A Fils	2	6	6
18	(Greece) S Tsitsipas	6	4	2
Q	(Lithuania) V Gaubas	4	0
2	(Germany) A Zverev	6	6

Fourth round
13	(France) A Fils	6^{3}	1
2	(Germany) A Zverev	7^{7}	6

== Seeded players ==
The following are the projected seeded players, based on live ATP rankings as of 4 May 2025. Actual seedings will be based on ATP rankings as of 5 May 2025. Rankings and points before are as of 5 May 2025.

Seed	Rank	Player	Points before	Points defending	Points earned	Points after	Status
1	1	(Italy) Jannik Sinner	9,730	0	650	10,380	Runner-up, lost to (Spain) Carlos Alcaraz [3]
2	2	(Germany) Alexander Zverev	8,085	1,000	200	7,285	Quarterfinals lost to (Italy) Lorenzo Musetti [8]
3	3	(Spain) Carlos Alcaraz	7,850	0	1,000	8,850	Champion, defeated (Italy) Jannik Sinner [1]
4	4	(United States) Taylor Fritz	4,815	200	10	4,625	Second round lost to (United States) Marcos Giron
5	5	(United Kingdom) Jack Draper	4,440	30	200	4,610	Quarterfinals lost to (Spain) Carlos Alcaraz [3]
6	7	(Norway) Casper Ruud	3,715	10	200	3,905	Quarterfinals lost to (Italy) Jannik Sinner [1]
7	8	(Australia) Alex de Minaur	3,635	100	100	3,635	Fourth round lost to (United States) Tommy Paul [11]
8	9	(Italy) Lorenzo Musetti	3,550	(90)^{†}	400	3,860	Semifinals lost to (Spain) Carlos Alcaraz [3]
9	10	(Denmark) Holger Rune	3,440	50	50	3,440	Third round lost to (France) Corentin Moutet
10	11	Daniil Medvedev	3,290	100	100	3,290	Fourth round lost to (Italy) Lorenzo Musetti [8]
11	12	(United States) Tommy Paul	3,210	400	400	3,210	Semifinals lost to (Italy) Jannik Sinner [1]
12	13	(United States) Ben Shelton	3,020	50	10	2,980	Second round lost to (Spain) Jaume Munar
13	14	(France) Arthur Fils	2,920	(175)^{†}	100	2,845	Fourth round lost to (Germany) Alexander Zverev [2]
14	15	(Bulgaria) Grigor Dimitrov	2,685	100	10	2,595	Second round lost to (Italy) Francesco Passaro [WC]
15	16	(United States) Frances Tiafoe	2,640	(25)^{‡}	10	2,625	Second round lost to (Austria) Sebastian Ofner [Q]
16	17	Andrey Rublev	2,580	50	10	2,540	Second round lost to (Hungary) Fábián Marozsán
17	18	(Argentina) Francisco Cerúndolo	2,425	50	100	2,475	Fourth round lost to (Italy) Jannik Sinner [1]
18	19	(Greece) Stefanos Tsitsipas	2,420	200	50	2,270	Third round lost to (France) Arthur Fils [13]
19	20	(Czech Republic) Tomáš Macháč	2,215	0	50	2,265	Third round lost to (United States) Tommy Paul [11]
20	21	(Czech Republic) Jakub Menšík	2,182	10	100	2,272	Fourth round lost to (Poland) Hubert Hurkacz [30]
21	22	(France) Ugo Humbert	2,145	0	10	2,155	Second round retired against (France) Corentin Moutet
22	23	(United States) Sebastian Korda	2,020	50	50	2,020	Third round lost to (Spain) Jaume Munar
23	24	Karen Khachanov	1,910	100	100	1,910	Fourth round lost to (Spain) Carlos Alcaraz [3]
24	25	(Australia) Alexei Popyrin	1,860	10	50	1,900	Third round lost to Daniil Medvedev [10]
25	26	(Spain) Alejandro Davidovich Fokina	1,745	(25)^{‡}	10	1,730	Second round lost to (Netherlands) Jesper de Jong [LL]
~~26~~	~~27~~	~~(Canada) Félix Auger-Aliassime~~	1,735	50	0	1,685	Withdrew due to back injury
27	28	(Canada) Denis Shapovalov	1,726	10	10	1,726	Second round lost to (Lithuania) Vilius Gaubas [Q]
28	29	(United States) Brandon Nakashima	1,675	(35)^{‡}	50	1,690	Third round lost to (Italy) Lorenzo Musetti [8]
29	30	(Italy) Matteo Berrettini	1,670	0	50	1,720	Third round retired against (Norway) Casper Ruud [6]
30	31	(Poland) Hubert Hurkacz	1,665	200	200	1,665	Quarterfinals lost to (United States) Tommy Paul [11]
31	32	(United States) Alex Michelsen	1,570	(30)^{‡}	10	1,550	Second round lost to (Serbia) Laslo Djere
32	33	(Argentina) Sebastián Báez	1,540	100	10	1,450	Second round lost to (Czech Republic) Vít Kopřiva [Q]

† The player's 2024 points were replaced by a better result for purposes of his ranking as of 5 May 2025. He is defending points from an ATP Challenger Tour event (Bordeaux or Turin) instead.
‡ The player's 2024 points were replaced by a better result for purposes of his ranking as of 5 May 2025. Points for his 19th best result will be deducted instead.

=== Withdrawn seeded players ===
The following player would have been seeded, but withdrew before the tournament began.

Rank	Player	Points before	Points dropping	Points after	Withdrawal reason
6	(Serbia) Novak Djokovic	4,130	50	4,080	Schedule change

== Other entry information ==
=== Wildcards ===
- (Italy) Federico Cinà
- (Italy) Fabio Fognini
- (Italy) Matteo Gigante
- (Italy) Luca Nardi
- (Italy) Francesco Passaro

=== Protected ranking ===
- (United States) Reilly Opelka

=== Withdrawals ===
- § (Canada) Félix Auger-Aliassime → replaced by (Bolivia) Hugo Dellien (LL)
- § (Belgium) Zizou Bergs → replaced by (United Kingdom) Cameron Norrie (LL)
- § (France) Benjamin Bonzi → replaced by (Netherlands) Jesper de Jong (LL)
- ‡ (Serbia) Novak Djokovic → replaced by (Hungary) Fábián Marozsán
- ‡ (Belgium) David Goffin → replaced by (Australia) Aleksandar Vukic
- ‡ (France) Gaël Monfils → replaced by (Australia) Rinky Hijikata
- ‡ (Japan) Kei Nishikori → replaced by (Germany) Daniel Altmaier
- ‡ (China) Shang Juncheng → replaced by (Canada) Gabriel Diallo
- § (Germany) Jan-Lennard Struff → replaced by (Spain) Pablo Carreño Busta (LL)
- ‡ (Chile) Alejandro Tabilo → replaced by (Australia) Christopher O'Connell
- ‡ (China) Zhang Zhizhen → replaced by (France) Hugo Gaston

‡ – withdrew from entry list
§ – withdrew from main draw

== Qualifying ==
=== Seeds ===
1. (Belgium) Raphaël Collignon (first round)
2. (Poland) Kamil Majchrzak (first round)
3. (United Kingdom) Cameron Norrie (qualifying competition, lucky loser)
4. (Kazakhstan) Alexander Shevchenko (qualified)
5. (Netherlands) Jesper de Jong (qualifying competition, lucky loser)
6. (Brazil) Thiago Monteiro (first round)
7. (Czech Republic) Vít Kopřiva (qualified)
8. (Spain) Pablo Carreño Busta (qualifying competition, lucky loser)
9. (Chinese Taipei) Tseng Chun-hsin (qualified)
10. (Bolivia) Hugo Dellien (qualifying competition, lucky loser)
11. (United Kingdom) Billy Harris (first round)
12. (Portugal) Jaime Faria (qualifying competition, retired)
13. (United States) Nishesh Basavareddy (qualifying competition)
14. (Brazil) Thiago Seyboth Wild (qualified)
15. (Colombia) Daniel Elahi Galán (first round)
16. (Brazil) Felipe Meligeni Alves (withdrew)
17. (France) Valentin Royer (qualifying competition)
18. (United States) Ethan Quinn (first round)
19. (United States) Tristan Boyer (first round)
20. Pavel Kotov (first round)
21. (Germany) Yannick Hanfmann (qualifying competition)
22. (France) Adrian Mannarino (first round)
23. (United States) Eliot Spizzirri (first round)
24. (Argentina) Juan Manuel Cerúndolo (qualifying competition)

=== Qualifiers ===
1. (United States) Nicolas Moreno de Alboran
2. (Austria) Sebastian Ofner
3. (Serbia) Dušan Lajović
4. (Kazakhstan) Alexander Shevchenko
5. (Brazil) Thiago Seyboth Wild
6. (Finland) Otto Virtanen
7. (Czech Republic) Vít Kopřiva
8. (Argentina) Román Andrés Burruchaga
9. (Chinese Taipei) Tseng Chun-hsin
10. (Lithuania) Vilius Gaubas
11. (Chile) Tomás Barrios Vera
12. (Spain) Carlos Taberner

=== Lucky losers ===
1. (United Kingdom) Cameron Norrie
2. (Netherlands) Jesper de Jong
3. (Spain) Pablo Carreño Busta
4. (Bolivia) Hugo Dellien

=== Qualifying draw ===
==== First qualifier ====
First round
1	(Belgium) Raphaël Collignon	4	4
(United States) Nicolas Moreno de Alboran	6	6
WC	(Italy) Giulio Zeppieri	4	7	6
20	Pavel Kotov	6	5	3

Qualifying competition
(United States) Nicolas Moreno de Alboran	6	3	6
WC	(Italy) Giulio Zeppieri	4	6	1

==== Second qualifier ====
First round
2	(Poland) Kamil Majchrzak	4	4
(Austria) Sebastian Ofner	6	6
(Japan) Taro Daniel	2	6	4
21	(Germany) Yannick Hanfmann	6	4	6

Qualifying competition
(Austria) Sebastian Ofner	7^{7}	6
21	(Germany) Yannick Hanfmann	6^{1}	2

==== Third qualifier ====
First round
3	(United Kingdom) Cameron Norrie	6	6
WC	(Italy) Jacopo Vasamì	3	2
(Serbia) Dušan Lajović	7	6^{5}	6
18	(United States) Ethan Quinn	5	7^{7}	3

Qualifying competition
3	(United Kingdom) Cameron Norrie	1	6	3
(Serbia) Dušan Lajović	6	4	6

==== Fourth qualifier ====
First round
4	(Kazakhstan) Alexander Shevchenko	6	6
(Argentina) Juan Pablo Ficovich	4	4
(Hungary) Márton Fucsovics	6	6
Alt	(Italy) Stefano Napolitano	2	3

Qualifying competition
4	(Kazakhstan) Alexander Shevchenko	6	6
(Hungary) Márton Fucsovics	4	2

==== Fifth qualifier ====
First round
5	(Netherlands) Jesper de Jong	6	6
(France) Harold Mayot	2	4
WC	(Italy) Pierluigi Basile	2	3
14	(Brazil) Thiago Seyboth Wild	6	6

Qualifying competition
5	(Netherlands) Jesper de Jong	6^{5}	4
14	(Brazil) Thiago Seyboth Wild	7^{7}	6

==== Sixth qualifier ====
First round
6	(Brazil) Thiago Monteiro	6^{5}	7^{7}	3
WC	(Italy) Federico Arnaboldi	7^{7}	6^{5}	6
(Finland) Otto Virtanen	7^{7}	4	6
19	(United States) Tristan Boyer	6^{3}	6	3

Qualifying competition
WC	(Italy) Federico Arnaboldi	3	1
(Finland) Otto Virtanen	6	6

==== Seventh qualifier ====
First round
7	(Czech Republic) Vít Kopřiva	6	5	6
(Czech Republic) Dalibor Svrčina	2	7	2
(United States) Mitchell Krueger	5	1
13	(United States) Nishesh Basavareddy	7	6

Qualifying competition
7	(Czech Republic) Vít Kopřiva	6	6
13	(United States) Nishesh Basavareddy	4	2

==== Eighth qualifier ====
First round
8	(Spain) Pablo Carreño Busta	7^{7}	2
(Argentina) Thiago Agustín Tirante	6^{5}	1^{r}
(Argentina) Román Andrés Burruchaga	6	2	6
15	(Colombia) Daniel Elahi Galán	4	6	3

Qualifying competition
8	(Spain) Pablo Carreño Busta	6	3	2
(Argentina) Román Andrés Burruchaga	3	6	6

==== Ninth qualifier ====
First round
9	(Chinese Taipei) Tseng Chun-hsin	6	6
WC	(Italy) Gabriele Piraino	2	4
(France) Pierre-Hugues Herbert	3	6^{6}
24	(Argentina) Juan Manuel Cerúndolo	6	7^{8}

Qualifying competition
9	(Chinese Taipei) Tseng Chun-hsin	6	6
24	(Argentina) Juan Manuel Cerúndolo	1	4

==== Tenth qualifier ====
First round
10	(Bolivia) Hugo Dellien	6	6^{1}	6
(Switzerland) Marc-Andrea Hüsler	3	7^{7}	3
(Lithuania) Vilius Gaubas	6	6
23	(United States) Eliot Spizzirri	1	2

Qualifying competition
10	(Bolivia) Hugo Dellien	5	3
(Lithuania) Vilius Gaubas	7	6

==== Eleventh qualifier ====
First round
11	(United Kingdom) Billy Harris	2	4
(Chile) Tomás Barrios Vera	6	6
(Argentina) Federico Agustín Gómez	4	6	5
17	(France) Valentin Royer	6	4	7

Qualifying competition
(Chile) Tomás Barrios Vera	7	5	7
17	(France) Valentin Royer	5	7	5

==== Twelfth qualifier ====
First round
12	(Portugal) Jaime Faria	4	7^{7}	6
(Switzerland) Jérôme Kym	6	6^{5}	4
(Spain) Carlos Taberner	6	0	6
22	(France) Adrian Mannarino	1	6	0

Qualifying competition
12	(Portugal) Jaime Faria	0	0^{r}
(Spain) Carlos Taberner	6	0
