= 2025 Piemonte Open – Singles =

Singles
- 2025 Piemonte Open

Final
- Champion: (Kazakhstan) Alexander Bublik
- Runner-up: (China) Bu Yunchaokete
- Score: 6–3, 6–3

Events
Singles	Doubles
← 2024 ·	Piemonte Open	· 2026 →

Francesco Passaro was the defending champion but retired from his quarterfinals match against Bu Yunchaokete.

Alexander Bublik won the title after defeating Bu 6–3, 6–3 in the final.

== Seeds ==
The top four seeds received a bye into the second round.

1. (Italy) Flavio Cobolli (quarterfinals)
2. (Italy) Luciano Darderi (second round)
3. (Argentina) Tomás Martín Etcheverry (quarterfinals)
4. (Spain) Roberto Carballés Baena (withdrew)
5. (Argentina) Camilo Ugo Carabelli (semifinals)
6. (Germany) Daniel Altmaier (semifinals)
7. (China) Bu Yunchaokete (final)
8. (Kazakhstan) Alexander Bublik (champion)

== Draw ==
=== Key ===
- Q = Qualifier
- WC = Wild card
- LL = Lucky loser
- Alt = Alternate
- ITF = ITF entry
- PR = Protected ranking
- SR = Special ranking
- SE = Special exempt
- JE = Junior exempt
- JR = Junior Accelerator Programme entrant
- CO = College Accelerator Programme entrant
- NG = Next Gen Accelerator Program entrant
- w/o = Walkover
- r = Retired
- d = Defaulted

=== Finals ===
Semifinals
6	(Germany) Daniel Altmaier	2	4
8	(Kazakhstan) Alexander Bublik	6	6
5	(Argentina) Camilo Ugo Carabelli	3	2
7	(China) Bu Yunchaokete	6	6

Final
8	(Kazakhstan) Alexander Bublik	6	6
7	(China) Bu Yunchaokete	3	3

=== Top half ===
First round
Alt	(Argentina) A Collarini	6	6
Alt	(Switzerland) M-A Hüsler	4	3
(Argentina) JM Cerúndolo	7^{7}	6
WC	(Italy) F Cinà	6^{3}	4
Q	(Italy) A Pellegrino	3	4
6	(Germany) D Altmaier	6	6
(United States) E Spizzirri	2	3
Q	(Ukraine) V Sachko	6	6
Alt	(Italy) F Arnaboldi	2	6	7
(United States) E Quinn	6	2	5
Alt	(Italy) M Gigante	3	1
8	(Kazakhstan) A Bublik	6	6

Second round
1/WC	(Italy) F Cobolli	7^{7}	7^{9}
Alt	(Argentina) A Collarini	6^{4}	6^{7}
(Argentina) JM Cerúndolo	3	2
6	(Germany) D Altmaier	6	6
3	(Argentina) TM Etcheverry	7^{7}	7^{10}
Q	(Ukraine) V Sachko	6^{2}	6^{8}
Alt	(Italy) F Arnaboldi	6	3	3
8	(Kazakhstan) A Bublik	0	6	6

Quarterfinals
1/WC	(Italy) F Cobolli	3	5
6	(Germany) D Altmaier	6	7
3	(Argentina) TM Etcheverry	2	6	5
8	(Kazakhstan) A Bublik	6	3	7

Semifinals
6	(Germany) D Altmaier	2	4
8	(Kazakhstan) A Bublik	6	6

=== Bottom half ===
First round
5	(Argentina) C Ugo Carabelli	6	6
Alt	(Finland) O Virtanen	3	2
(Italy) L Nardi	6	5	7^{7}
(Argentina) M Navone	1	7	6^{2}
WC	(Italy) J Vasamì	3	2
(Chinese Taipei) C-h Tseng	6	6
7	(China) Y Bu	7^{7}	6
Q	(Italy) G Fonio	6^{5}	4
Q	(Ukraine) O Prihodko	5	4
(Italy) F Fognini	7	6
Alt	(Argentina) FA Gómez	6^{6}	7^{8}	3
(Italy) F Passaro	7^{8}	6^{6}	6

Second round
5	(Argentina) C Ugo Carabelli	6	6
(Italy) L Nardi	2	4
(Chinese Taipei) C-h Tseng	6	6
LL	(Spain) C Sánchez Jover	2	4
7	(China) Y Bu	7	6
(Italy) F Fognini	5	2
(Italy) F Passaro	7^{7}	6
2	(Italy) L Darderi	6^{3}	4

Quarterfinals
5	(Argentina) C Ugo Carabelli	1	7^{7}	6
(Chinese Taipei) C-h Tseng	6	6^{2}	1
7	(China) Y Bu	5
(Italy) F Passaro	5^{r}

Semifinals
5	(Argentina) C Ugo Carabelli	3	2
7	(China) Y Bu	6	6
