= 2022 Forlì Open – Doubles =

Doubles
- 2022 Forlì Open

Final
- Champions: (Colombia) Nicolás Barrientos (Mexico) Miguel Ángel Reyes-Varela
- Runners-up: (France) Sadio Doumbia (France) Fabien Reboul
- Score: 7–5, 4–6, [10–4]

Events
Singles	Doubles
Forlì Open	· 2023 →

This was the inaugural edition of the doubles competition of the 2022 Forlì Open tennis tournament.

Nicolás Barrientos and Miguel Ángel Reyes-Varela won the title after defeating Sadio Doumbia and Fabien Reboul 7–5, 4–6, [10–4] in the final.

== Seeds ==
1. (Colombia) Nicolás Barrientos / (Mexico) Miguel Ángel Reyes-Varela (champions)
2. (United States) Nathaniel Lammons / (France) Albano Olivetti (semifinals)
3. (France) Sadio Doumbia / (France) Fabien Reboul (final)
4. (Ecuador) Diego Hidalgo / (Colombia) Cristian Rodríguez (first round)

== Draw ==
=== Key ===
- Q = Qualifier
- WC = Wild card
- LL = Lucky loser
- Alt = Alternate
- SE = Special exempt
- PR = Protected ranking
- ITF = ITF entry
- JE = Junior exempt
- w/o = Walkover
- r = Retired
- d = Defaulted
- SR = Special ranking

First round
1	(Colombia) N Barrientos (Mexico) MÁ Reyes-Varela	7^{7}	6
WC	(Italy) E Dalla Valle (Italy) J Ocleppo	6^{5}	3
(Argentina) A Collarini (Argentina) TM Etcheverry	6	6
WC	(Italy) S Caruso (Italy) S Napolitano	4	3
4	(Ecuador) D Hidalgo (Colombia) C Rodríguez	4	4
(Jamaica) D Brown (United States) E King	6	6
(Italy) L Darderi (Brazil) F Romboli	4	6	[9]
(Brazil) Oscar José Gutierrez (Brazil) T Seyboth Wild	6	3	[11]
(Italy) M Cecchinato (Italy) F Cobolli	4	7	[8]
(Italy) A Giannessi (Italy) G Mager	6	5	[10]
(France) G Blancaneaux (France) C Lestienne	5	2
3	(France) S Doumbia (France) F Reboul	7	6
(Italy) M Bortolotti (Spain) S Martos Gornés	4	4
(Italy) F Baldi (Italy) L Nardi	6	6
(Portugal) G Elias (Kazakhstan) T Skatov	5	6^{5}
2	(United States) N Lammons (France) A Olivetti	7	7^{7}

Quarterfinals
1	(Colombia) N Barrientos (Mexico) MÁ Reyes-Varela	6	6
(Argentina) A Collarini (Argentina) TM Etcheverry	3	1
(Jamaica) D Brown (United States) E King	6	6
(Brazil) OJ Gutierrez (Brazil) T Seyboth Wild	4	3
(Italy) A Giannessi (Italy) G Mager	3	2
3	(France) S Doumbia (France) F Reboul	6	6
(Italy) F Baldi (Italy) L Nardi	6^{7}	5
2	(United States) N Lammons (France) A Olivetti	7^{9}	7

Semifinals
1	(Colombia) N Barrientos (Mexico) MÁ Reyes-Varela	6	7
(Jamaica) D Brown (United States) E King	3	5
3	(France) S Doumbia (France) F Reboul	6	6
2	(United States) N Lammons (France) A Olivetti	2	4

Final
1	(Colombia) N Barrientos (Mexico) MÁ Reyes-Varela	7	4	[10]
3	(France) S Doumbia (France) F Reboul	5	6	[4]
