= 2025 Piemonte Open – Doubles =

Doubles
- 2025 Piemonte Open

Final
- Champions: (Uruguay) Ariel Behar (Belgium) Joran Vliegen
- Runners-up: (Netherlands) Robin Haase (Germany) Hendrik Jebens
- Score: 6–2, 6–4

Events
Singles	Doubles
← 2024 ·	Piemonte Open	· 2026 →

Harri Heliövaara and Henry Patten were the defending champions but chose not to defend their title.

Ariel Behar and Joran Vliegen won the title after defeating Robin Haase and Hendrik Jebens 6–2, 6–4 in the final.

== Seeds ==
1. (Argentina) Andrés Molteni / (Italy) Andrea Vavassori (semifinals)
2. (United Kingdom) Jamie Murray / (United States) Rajeev Ram (first round)
3. (Uruguay) Ariel Behar / (Belgium) Joran Vliegen (champions)
4. (Germany) Jakob Schnaitter / (Germany) Mark Wallner (quarterfinals)

== Draw ==
=== Key ===
- Q = Qualifier
- WC = Wild card
- LL = Lucky loser
- Alt = Alternate
- ITF = ITF entry
- PR = Protected ranking
- SR = Special ranking
- SE = Special exempt
- JE = Junior exempt
- JR = Junior Accelerator Programme entrant
- CO = College Accelerator Programme entrant
- NG = Next Gen Accelerator Program entrant
- w/o = Walkover
- r = Retired
- d = Defaulted

=== Draw ===
First round
1	(Argentina) A Molteni (Italy) A Vavassori	7	7
I Liutarevich (Netherlands) M Veldheer	5	5
(Colombia) N Barrientos (Ecuador) D Hidalgo	6	6
(Mexico) S González (United States) A Krajicek	3	3
3	(Uruguay) A Behar (Belgium) J Vliegen	6	6
WC	(Italy) Lorenzo Carboni (Italy) J Vasamì	4	2
(Argentina) A Collarini (Argentina) C Ugo Carabelli
(Italy) F Fognini (Italy) A Pellegrino	w/o
(United States) V Kirkov (Netherlands) B Stevens	1
(Austria) A Erler (Netherlands) M Middelkoop	1^{r}
WC	(Italy) F Romano (Italy) Edoardo Zanada	4	2
4	(Germany) J Schnaitter (Germany) M Wallner	6	6
(Netherlands) R Haase (Germany) H Jebens	4	7^{7}	[10]
(Romania) V Cornea (Poland) K Drzewiecki	6	6^{5}	[7]
(Brazil) F Romboli (Australia) J-P Smith	7^{7}	4	[14]
2	(United Kingdom) J Murray (United States) R Ram	6^{4}	6	[12]

Quarterfinals
1	(Argentina) A Molteni (Italy) A Vavassori	6	6
(Colombia) N Barrientos (Ecuador) D Hidalgo	3	1
3	(Uruguay) A Behar (Belgium) J Vliegen	6	6^{1}	[10]
(Italy) F Fognini (Italy) A Pellegrino	2	7^{7}	[8]
(United States) V Kirkov (Netherlands) B Stevens	6	2	[12]
4	(Germany) J Schnaitter (Germany) M Wallner	4	6	[10]
(Netherlands) R Haase (Germany) H Jebens	6	7^{7}
(Brazil) F Romboli (Australia) J-P Smith	4	6^{1}

Semifinals
1	(Argentina) A Molteni (Italy) A Vavassori	4	5
3	(Uruguay) A Behar (Belgium) J Vliegen	6	7
(United States) V Kirkov (Netherlands) B Stevens	5	6	[6]
(Netherlands) R Haase (Germany) H Jebens	7	2	[10]

Final
3	(Uruguay) A Behar (Belgium) J Vliegen	6	6
(Netherlands) R Haase (Germany) H Jebens	2	4
