= 2022 Forlì Open – Singles =

Singles
- 2022 Forlì Open

Final
- Champion: (Italy) Lorenzo Musetti
- Runner-up: (Italy) Francesco Passaro
- Score: 2–6, 6–3, 6–2

Events
Singles	Doubles
Forlì Open	· 2023 →

This was the inaugural edition of the singles competition of the 2022 Forlì Open tennis tournament.

Lorenzo Musetti won the title after defeating Francesco Passaro 2–6, 6–3, 6–2 in the final.

== Seeds ==
1. (Italy) Lorenzo Musetti (champion)
2. (Spain) Jaume Munar (semifinals)
3. (Argentina) Tomás Martín Etcheverry (quarterfinals)
4. (Bolivia) Hugo Dellien (first round)
5. (Japan) Taro Daniel (quarterfinals)
6. (Italy) Gianluca Mager (first round)
7. (Argentina) Juan Manuel Cerúndolo (quarterfinals, retired)
8. (Italy) Marco Cecchinato (first round)

== Draw ==
=== Key ===
- Q = Qualifier
- WC = Wild card
- LL = Lucky loser
- Alt = Alternate
- SE = Special exempt
- PR = Protected ranking
- ITF = ITF entry
- JE = Junior exempt
- w/o = Walkover
- r = Retired
- d = Defaulted
- SR = Special ranking

=== Finals ===
Semifinals
1/WC	(Italy) Lorenzo Musetti	3	6	6
Q	(Italy) Matteo Gigante	6	1	1
Q	(Italy) Francesco Passaro	6	7
2	(Spain) Jaume Munar	3	5

Final
1/WC	(Italy) Lorenzo Musetti	2	6	6
Q	(Italy) Francesco Passaro	6	3	2

=== Top half ===
First round
1/WC	(Italy) L Musetti	6	5	6
(Kazakhstan) T Skatov	4	7	1
(France) C Lestienne	3	5
(Germany) M Marterer	6	7
Q	(Netherlands) R Haase	6	6
LL	(Latvia) E Gulbis	3	0
(Italy) F Cobolli	6^{1}	1
7	(Argentina) JM Cerúndolo	7^{7}	6
3	(Argentina) TM Etcheverry	5	6	6
(Italy) F Agamenone	7	3	0
(Italy) S Caruso	6	3	6^{3}
WC	(Italy) S Napolitano	3	6	7^{7}
Q	(Belgium) K Coppejans	6	2	2
(Italy) T Fabbiano	4	6	6
Q	(Italy) M Gigante	6	3	6
6	(Italy) G Mager	3	6	3

Second round
1/WC	(Italy) L Musetti	3	7	6
(Germany) M Marterer	6	5	2
Q	(Netherlands) R Haase	3	2
7	(Argentina) JM Cerúndolo	6	6
3	(Argentina) TM Etcheverry	6^{6}	7	6
WC	(Italy) S Napolitano	7^{8}	5	1
(Italy) T Fabbiano	6^{3}	4
Q	(Italy) M Gigante	7^{7}	6

Quarterfinals
1/WC	(Italy) L Musetti	6^{9}	6	0
7	(Argentina) JM Cerúndolo	7^{11}	1	0^{r}
3	(Argentina) TM Etcheverry	2	3
Q	(Italy) M Gigante	6	6

Semifinals
1/WC	(Italy) L Musetti	3	6	6
Q	(Italy) M Gigante	6	1	1

=== Bottom half ===
First round
8	(Italy) M Cecchinato	7	2	2
Alt	(Argentina) A Collarini	5	6	6
(France) G Blancaneaux	3	1
Alt	(Italy) R Bonadio	6	6
Q	(France) A Fils	3	3
Q	(Italy) F Passaro	6	6
(Italy) G Zeppieri	7^{7}	6
4	(Bolivia) H Dellien	6^{5}	3
5	(Japan) T Daniel	7^{7}	6
(Italy) F Gaio	6^{5}	3
(Italy) L Nardi	6^{4}	6^{2}
Q	(France) M Martineau	7^{7}	7^{7}
WC	(Croatia) B Ćorić	6	6^{5}	3
(Portugal) G Elias	3	7^{7}	6
(Italy) A Giannessi	2	2
2	(Spain) J Munar	6	6

Second round
Alt	(Argentina) A Collarini	5	5
Alt	(Italy) R Bonadio	7	7
Q	(Italy) F Passaro	6	3
(Italy) G Zeppieri	4	0^{r}
5	(Japan) T Daniel	6	6
Q	(France) M Martineau	3	1
(Portugal) G Elias	3	0
2	(Spain) J Munar	6	6

Quarterfinals
Alt	(Italy) R Bonadio	4	1
Q	(Italy) F Passaro	6	6
5	(Japan) T Daniel	2	2
2	(Spain) J Munar	6	6

Semifinals
Q	(Italy) F Passaro	6	7
2	(Spain) J Munar	3	5
