= 2024 Piemonte Open – Doubles =

Doubles
- 2024 Piemonte Open

Final
- Champions: (Finland) Harri Heliövaara (United Kingdom) Henry Patten
- Runners-up: (Germany) Andreas Mies (United Kingdom) Neal Skupski
- Score: 6–3, 6–3

Events
Singles	Doubles
- Piemonte Open

Harri Heliövaara and Henry Patten won the title after defeating Andreas Mies and Neal Skupski 6–3, 6–3 in the final.

Andrey Golubev and Denys Molchanov were the defending champions but only Molchanov chose to defend his title, partnering Diego Hidalgo. They lost in the first round to Romain Arneodo and Sam Weissborn.

== Seeds ==
1. (Germany) Andreas Mies / (United Kingdom) Neal Skupski (final)
2. (United States) Nathaniel Lammons / (United States) Jackson Withrow (quarterfinals)
3. (Ecuador) Gonzalo Escobar / (Kazakhstan) Aleksandr Nedovyesov (semifinals)
4. (Austria) Alexander Erler / (Austria) Lucas Miedler (quarterfinals)

== Draw ==
Key

- Q = Qualifier
- WC = Wild card
- LL = Lucky loser
- Alt = Alternate
- ITF = ITF entry
- PR = Protected ranking
- SR = Special ranking
- SE = Special exempt
- JE = Junior exempt
- JR = Junior Accelerator Programme entrant
- CO = College Accelerator Programme entrant
- NG = Next Gen Accelerator Program entrant
- w/o = Walkover
- r = Retired
- d = Defaulted

=== Draw ===
First round
1	(Germany) A Mies (United Kingdom) N Skupski	6	6
(Germany) C Frantzen (Germany) H Jebens	3	4
(Argentina) F Coria (Argentina) C Ugo Carabelli
(Brazil) F Romboli (Brazil) M Zormann	w/o
3	(Ecuador) G Escobar (Kazakhstan) A Nedovyesov	6	6
(India) S Balaji (Germany) A Begemann	4	3
(Ecuador) D Hidalgo (Ukraine) D Molchanov	2	5
(Monaco) R Arneodo (Austria) S Weissborn	6	7
(Italy) F Fognini (Italy) A Pellegrino
4	(Austria) A Erler (Austria) L Miedler	w/o
(Italy) M Bortolotti (Australia) J-P Smith
(Finland) H Heliövaara (United Kingdom) H Patten	w/o

Quarterfinals
1	(Germany) A Mies (United Kingdom) N Skupski	6	6
(Brazil) F Romboli (Brazil) M Zormann	3	4
3	(Ecuador) G Escobar (Kazakhstan) A Nedovyesov	7	6
(Venezuela) LD Martínez (Colombia) C Rodríguez	5	3
(Monaco) R Arneodo (Austria) S Weissborn	6	7
4	(Austria) A Erler (Austria) L Miedler	2	5
(Finland) H Heliövaara (United Kingdom) H Patten	4	7^{7}	[12]
2	(United States) N Lammons (United States) J Withrow	6	6^{5}	[10]

Semifinals
1	(Germany) A Mies (United Kingdom) N Skupski	6	6^{4}	[10]
3	(Ecuador) G Escobar (Kazakhstan) A Nedovyesov	2	7^{7}	[5]
(Monaco) R Arneodo (Austria) S Weissborn	5	7^{7}	[6]
(Finland) H Heliövaara (United Kingdom) H Patten	7	6^{4}	[10]

Final
1	(Germany) A Mies (United Kingdom) N Skupski	3	3
(Finland) H Heliövaara (United Kingdom) H Patten	6	6
