= 2022 Forlì Open =

- Date: 30 May – 5 June
- Edition: 1st
- Draw: 32S / 16D
- Surface: Clay
- Location: Forlì, Italy

Champions

Singles
- (Italy) Lorenzo Musetti

Doubles
- (Colombia) Nicolás Barrientos / (Mexico) Miguel Ángel Reyes-Varela
Forlì Open	· 2023 →

The 2022 Forlì Open was a professional tennis tournament played on clay courts. It was the inaugural edition of the tournament which was part of the 2022 ATP Challenger Tour. It took place in Forlì, Italy between 30 May and 5 June 2022.

== Champions ==
=== Singles ===
- (Italy) Lorenzo Musetti def. (Italy) Francesco Passaro 2–6, 6–3, 6–2.

=== Doubles ===
- (Colombia) Nicolás Barrientos / (Mexico) Miguel Ángel Reyes-Varela def. (France) Sadio Doumbia / (France) Fabien Reboul 7–5, 4–6, [10–4].

== Singles main-draw entrants ==
=== Seeds ===
Country	Player	Rank^{1}	Seed
ITA	Lorenzo Musetti	66	1
ESP	Jaume Munar	87	2
ARG	Tomás Martín Etcheverry	88	3
BOL	Hugo Dellien	90	4
JPN	Taro Daniel	115	5
ITA	Gianluca Mager	119	6
ARG	Juan Manuel Cerúndolo	130	7
ITA	Marco Cecchinato	132	8

- ^{1} Rankings as of 23 May 2021.

=== Other entrants ===
The following players received wildcards into the singles main draw:

- (Croatia) Borna Ćorić
- (Italy) Lorenzo Musetti
- (Italy) Stefano Napolitano

The following player received entry into the singles main draw as a special exempt:

- (Italy) ~~Andrea Pellegrino~~

The following players received entry into the singles main draw as alternates:

- (Italy) Riccardo Bonadio
- (Argentina) Andrea Collarini

The following players received entry from the qualifying draw:

- (Belgium) Kimmer Coppejans
- (France) Arthur Fils
- (Italy) Matteo Gigante
- (Netherlands) Robin Haase
- (France) Matteo Martineau
- (Italy) Francesco Passaro

The following player received entry as a lucky loser:

- (Latvia) Ernests Gulbis
