= 2025 Piemonte Open =

- Date: 13 – 18 May
- Edition: 3rd
- Surface: Clay
- Location: Turin, Italy

Champions

Singles
- (Kazakhstan) Alexander Bublik

Doubles
- (Uruguay) Ariel Behar / (Belgium) Joran Vliegen
← 2024 ·	Piemonte Open	· 2026 →

The 2025 Piemonte Open, known as the Piemonte Open Intesa Sanpaolo, was a professional tennis tournament played on clay courts. It was the third edition of the tournament and an ATP Challenger Tour 175 event on the 2025 ATP Challenger Tour. It took place in Turin, Italy between 13 and 18 May 2025.

== Singles main-draw entrants ==
=== Seeds ===
Country	Player	Rank^{1}	Seed
ITA	Flavio Cobolli	34	1
ITA	Luciano Darderi	46	2
ARG	Tomás Martín Etcheverry	51	3
~~ESP~~	~~Roberto Carballés Baena~~	~~59~~	~~4~~
ARG	Camilo Ugo Carabelli	60	5
GER	Daniel Altmaier	71	6
CHN	Bu Yunchaokete	73	7
KAZ	Alexander Bublik	76	8

- ^{1} Rankings are as of 5 May 2025.

=== Other entrants ===
The following players received wildcards into the singles main draw:

- (Italy) Federico Cinà
- (Italy) Flavio Cobolli
- (Italy) Jacopo Vasamì

The following players received entry into the singles main draw as alternates:

- (Italy) Federico Arnaboldi
- (Argentina) Andrea Collarini
- (Italy) Matteo Gigante
- (Argentina) Federico Agustín Gómez
- (Switzerland) Marc-Andrea Hüsler
- (Finland) Otto Virtanen

The following players received entry from the qualifying draw:

- (Italy) Giovanni Fonio
- (Italy) Andrea Pellegrino
- (Ukraine) Oleg Prihodko
- (Ukraine) Vitaliy Sachko

The following player received entry as a lucky loser:

- (Spain) Carlos Sánchez Jover

== Champions ==
=== Singles ===
- (Kazakhstan) Alexander Bublik def. (China) Bu Yunchaokete 6–3, 6–3.

=== Doubles ===
- (Uruguay) Ariel Behar / (Belgium) Joran Vliegen def. (Netherlands) Robin Haase / (Germany) Hendrik Jebens 6–2, 6–4.
