= 2024 Piemonte Open =

- Date: 14 – 19 May
- Edition: 2nd
- Surface: Clay
- Location: Turin, Italy

Champions

Singles
- (Italy) Francesco Passaro

Doubles
- (Finland) Harri Heliövaara / (United Kingdom) Henry Patten
← 2023 ·	Piemonte Open	· 2025 →

The 2024 Piemonte Open was a professional tennis tournament played on clay courts. It was the second edition of the tournament and part of the 2024 ATP Challenger Tour. It took place in Turin, Italy between 14 and 19 May 2024.

== Singles main-draw entrants ==
=== Seeds ===
Country	Player	Rank^{1}	Seed
ITA	Lorenzo Musetti	29	1
ARG	Mariano Navone	31	2
ITA	Matteo Arnaldi	37	3
ITA	Lorenzo Sonego	47	4
ITA	Luciano Darderi	54	5
~~ITA~~	~~Flavio Cobolli~~	~~57~~	~~6~~
GER	Yannick Hanfmann	59	7
BRA	Thiago Seyboth Wild	61	8

- ^{1} Rankings are as of 6 May 2024.

=== Other entrants ===
The following players received wildcards into the singles main draw:

- (Italy) Matteo Arnaldi
- (Italy) Luciano Darderi
- (Italy) Francesco Passaro

The following players received entry into the singles main draw as alternates:

- (Austria) Jurij Rodionov
- (Argentina) Thiago Agustín Tirante
- (Argentina) Camilo Ugo Carabelli
- (Peru) Juan Pablo Varillas
- (United States) J. J. Wolf

The following players received entry from the qualifying draw:

- (Italy) Mattia Bellucci
- (Switzerland) Marc-Andrea Hüsler
- (Italy) Francesco Maestrelli
- (Brazil) Felipe Meligeni Alves

The following player received entry as a lucky loser:

- (Italy) Giulio Zeppieri

== Champions ==
=== Singles ===
- (Italy) Francesco Passaro def. (Italy) Lorenzo Musetti 6–3, 7–5.

=== Doubles ===
- (Finland) Harri Heliövaara / (United Kingdom) Henry Patten def. (Germany) Andreas Mies / (United Kingdom) Neal Skupski 6–3, 6–3.
