= Forlì Open =

- 2022 Forlì Open

ATP Challenger Tour
- Event name: Forlì Open
- Location: Forlì, Italy
- Venue: Carpena Tennis Club
- Category: ATP Challenger 125
- Surface: Clay

The Forlì Open is a professional tennis tournament played annually on outdoor clay courts of the Carpena Tennis Club, in Forlì, Italy since 2022. It is currently part of the ATP Challenger Tour.

== Past finals ==
=== Singles ===
Year	Champion	Runner-up	Score
2022	(Italy) Lorenzo Musetti	(Italy) Francesco Passaro	2–6, 6–3, 6–2

=== Doubles ===
Year	Champions	Runners-up	Score
2022	(Colombia) Nicolás Barrientos (Mexico) Miguel Ángel Reyes-Varela	(France) Sadio Doumbia (France) Fabien Reboul	7–5, 4–6, [10–4]
