= 2024 Italian Open – Men's singles =

Men's singles
- 2024 Italian Open

Final
- Champion: (Germany) Alexander Zverev
- Runner-up: (Chile) Nicolás Jarry
- Score: 6–4, 7–5

Details
- Draw: 96 (12 Q / 5 WC )
- Seeds: 32

Events
Singles	men	women
Doubles	men	women
- Italian Open

Alexander Zverev defeated Nicolás Jarry in the final, 6–4, 7–5 to win the men's singles tennis title at the 2024 Italian Open. It was his sixth ATP 1000 title and 22nd career title.

Daniil Medvedev was the defending champion, but lost to Tommy Paul in the fourth round.

Hubert Hurkacz became the sixth player born in the 1990s (after Dominic Thiem, Stefanos Tsitsipas, Zverev, Grigor Dimitrov, and Medvedev) to reach at least the quarterfinals at all nine ATP 1000 events. Taylor Fritz became the first American man to reach the quarterfinals of all three clay court Masters events.

Alejandro Tabilo and Jarry became the first Chilean players to reach an ATP 1000 semifinal since Fernando González at the 2009 Italian Open, and marked the first time that multiple Chileans reached the semifinals of the same 1000 event. With his win against Novak Djokovic in the third round, Tabilo also became the second Chilean (after González) to defeat a reigning world No. 1. Djokovic's loss marked the first time that he failed to reach the quarterfinals at this tournament.

This marked the final appearance of former world No. 1 and ten-time champion Rafael Nadal, at a ATP Masters 1000 tournament; he lost in the second round to Hurkacz.

== Seeds ==
All seeds receive a bye into the second round.

1. (Serbia) Novak Djokovic (third round)
2. Daniil Medvedev (fourth round)
3. (Germany) Alexander Zverev (champion)
4. Andrey Rublev (third round)
5. (Norway) Casper Ruud (second round)
6. (Greece) Stefanos Tsitsipas (quarterfinals)
7. (Poland) Hubert Hurkacz (quarterfinals)
8. (Bulgaria) Grigor Dimitrov (fourth round)
9. (Australia) Alex de Minaur (fourth round)
10. (Denmark) Holger Rune (third round)
11. (United States) Taylor Fritz (quarterfinals)
12. (United States) Ben Shelton (third round)
13. (France) Ugo Humbert (withdrew)
14. (United States) Tommy Paul (semifinals)
15. (Kazakhstan) Alexander Bublik (second round)
16. Karen Khachanov (fourth round)
17. (Argentina) Sebastián Báez (fourth round)
18. (Canada) Félix Auger-Aliassime (third round)
19. (France) Adrian Mannarino (second round)
20. (Argentina) Francisco Cerúndolo (third round)
21. (Chile) Nicolás Jarry (final)
22. (United States) Frances Tiafoe (second round)
23. (Netherlands) Tallon Griekspoor (second round)
24. (United States) Sebastian Korda (third round)
25. (Argentina) Tomás Martín Etcheverry (third round)
26. (Italy) Lorenzo Musetti (second round, retired)
27. (United Kingdom) Cameron Norrie (third round)
28. (Argentina) Mariano Navone (second round)
29. (Chile) Alejandro Tabilo (semifinals)
30. (Spain) Alejandro Davidovich Fokina (second round)
31. (France) Arthur Fils (second round)
32. (Australia) Jordan Thompson (second round)

Click on the seed number of a player to go to their draw section.

== Draw ==
Key

- Q = Qualifier
- WC = Wild card
- LL = Lucky loser
- Alt = Alternate
- ITF = ITF entry
- PR = Protected ranking
- SR = Special ranking
- SE = Special exempt
- JE = Junior exempt
- JR = Junior Accelerator Programme entrant
- CO = College Accelerator Programme entrant
- NG = Next Gen Accelerator Program entrant
- w/o = Walkover
- r = Retired
- d = Defaulted

=== Finals ===
Quarterfinals
29	(Chile) Alejandro Tabilo	6	6
(China) Zhang Zhizhen	3	4
3	(Germany) Alexander Zverev	6	6
11	(United States) Taylor Fritz	4	3
6	(Greece) Stefanos Tsitsipas	6	5	4
21	(Chile) Nicolás Jarry	3	7	6
7	(Poland) Hubert Hurkacz	5	6	3
14	(United States) Tommy Paul	7	3	6

Semifinals
29	(Chile) Alejandro Tabilo	6	6^{4}	2
3	(Germany) Alexander Zverev	1	7^{7}	6
21	(Chile) Nicolás Jarry	6	6^{3}	6
14	(United States) Tommy Paul	3	7^{7}	3

Final
3	(Germany) Alexander Zverev	6	7
21	(Chile) Nicolás Jarry	4	5

=== Top half ===
==== Section 1 ====
First round
LL	(France) C Moutet	3	7^{7}	6
R Safiullin	6	6^{1}	2
(Czech Republic) J Menšík	3	2
(Germany) Y Hanfmann	6	6
WC	(Italy) M Gigante	7^{7}	6
WC	(Italy) G Zeppieri	6^{2}	4
(Kazakhstan) A Shevchenko	6	6
(Hungary) F Marozsán	3	2

Second round
1	(Serbia) N Djokovic	6	6
LL	(France) C Moutet	3	1
(Germany) Y Hanfmann	3	6^{4}
29	(Chile) A Tabilo	6	7^{7}
20	(Argentina) F Cerúndolo	6	6
WC	(Italy) M Gigante	1	3
(Kazakhstan) A Shevchenko	4	4
16	K Khachanov	6	6

Third round
1	(Serbia) N Djokovic	2	3
29	(Chile) A Tabilo	6	6
20	(Argentina) F Cerúndolo	2	4
16	K Khachanov	6	6

Fourth round
29	(Chile) A Tabilo	7^{7}	7^{12}
16	K Khachanov	6^{5}	6^{10}

==== Section 2 ====
First round
P Kotov	6	6
(United States) A Michelsen	1	1
(China) Z Zhang	6	7
(Colombia) DE Galán	2	5
Q	(Brazil) T Monteiro	6	7
(France) G Monfils	2	5
(Serbia) M Kecmanović	6	6
Q	(United States) B Nakashima	4	4

Second round
12	(United States) B Shelton	4	6	6
P Kotov	6	3	4
(China) Z Zhang	6	6
19	(France) A Mannarino	1	3
32	(Australia) J Thompson	1	3
Q	(Brazil) T Monteiro	6	6
(Serbia) M Kecmanović	0	6	6
5	(Norway) C Ruud	6	4	4

Third round
12	(United States) B Shelton	2	4
(China) Z Zhang	6	6
Q	(Brazil) T Monteiro	6	4	7^{8}
(Serbia) M Kecmanović	2	6	6^{6}

Fourth round
(China) Z Zhang	7^{7}	6
Q	(Brazil) T Monteiro	6^{4}	3

==== Section 3 ====
First round
Q	(Argentina) D Schwartzman	2	2
(Australia) A Vukic	6	6
(Italy) L Darderi	6^{4}	6	7^{7}
PR	(Canada) D Shapovalov	7^{7}	3	6^{4}
(France) A Rinderknech	7^{7}	5	6^{7}
Q	(Italy) F Passaro	6^{3}	7	7^{9}
(Portugal) N Borges	6^{3}	6	7^{10}
(Spain) P Martínez	7^{7}	4	6^{8}

Second round
3	(Germany) A Zverev	6	6
(Australia) A Vukic	0	4
(Italy) L Darderi	6	6
28	(Argentina) M Navone	3	2
23	(Netherlands) T Griekspoor	6	3	6^{5}
Q	(Italy) F Passaro	4	6	7^{7}
(Portugal) N Borges	6	6
15	(Kazakhstan) A Bublik	4	4

Third round
3	(Germany) A Zverev	7^{7}	6
(Italy) L Darderi	6^{3}	2
Q	(Italy) F Passaro	6	6^{8}	6^{4}
(Portugal) N Borges	4	7^{10}	7^{7}

Fourth round
3	(Germany) A Zverev	6	7
(Portugal) N Borges	2	5

==== Section 4 ====
First round
(United Kingdom) D Evans	4	6	2
WC	(Italy) F Fognini	6	3	6
Q	(Germany) M Marterer	4	2
(Italy) F Cobolli	6	6
(United States) C Eubanks	4	4
Q	(France) T Atmane	6	6
(Japan) Y Nishioka	6	2	7^{7}
(Austria) S Ofner	3	6	6^{4}

Second round
11	(United States) T Fritz	6	6
WC	(Italy) F Fognini	3	4
(Italy) F Cobolli	6^{6}	6	4
24	(United States) S Korda	7^{8}	4	6
26	(Italy) L Musetti	5	0^{r}
Q	(France) T Atmane	7	1
(Japan) Y Nishioka	5	4
8	(Bulgaria) G Dimitrov	7	6

Third round
11	(United States) T Fritz	6	6
24	(United States) S Korda	3	4
Q	(France) T Atmane	6^{3}	3
8	(Bulgaria) G Dimitrov	7^{7}	6

Fourth round
11	(United States) T Fritz	6	6^{11}	6
8	(Bulgaria) G Dimitrov	2	7^{13}	1

=== Bottom half ===
==== Section 5 ====
First round
(Germany) J-L Struff	6	6
(Argentina) P Cachín	4	4
(Australia) R Hijikata	4	5
(Spain) J Munar	6	7
Q	(United States) N Moreno de Alboran	5	7^{7}	6^{4}
Q	(Netherlands) B van de Zandschulp	7	6^{5}	7^{7}
(Spain) R Carballés Baena	6^{7}	5
(Australia) C O'Connell	7^{9}	0^{r}

Second round
6	(Greece) S Tsitsipas	6^{1}	6	6
(Germany) J-L Struff	7^{7}	4	4
(Spain) J Munar	3	6	3
27	(United Kingdom) C Norrie	6	1	6
18	(Canada) F Auger-Aliassime	6	7^{8}
Q	(Netherlands) B van de Zandschulp	1	6^{6}
(Spain) R Carballés Baena	3	2
9	(Australia) A de Minaur	6	6

Third round
6	(Greece) S Tsitsipas	6	7^{7}
27	(United Kingdom) C Norrie	2	6^{1}
18	(Canada) F Auger-Aliassime	7^{7}	4	4
9	(Australia) A de Minaur	6^{2}	6	6

Fourth round
6	(Greece) S Tsitsipas	6	6
9	(Australia) A de Minaur	1	2

==== Section 6 ====
First round
WC	(Italy) S Napolitano	6	7^{7}
LL	(United States) JJ Wolf	2	6^{3}
LL	(France) H Mayot	6	5	4
(Italy) M Arnaldi	3	7	6
Q	(France) A Müller	4	7^{7}	6
(Hungary) M Fucsovics	6	6^{5}	2
(Finland) E Ruusuvuori	6	3	3
(United States) M Giron	3	6	6

Second round
LL	(China) J Shang	7^{7}	1	0
WC	(Italy) S Napolitano	6^{3}	6	6
(Italy) M Arnaldi	2	6^{6}
21	(Chile) N Jarry	6	7^{8}
31	(France) A Fils	5	3
Q	(France) A Müller	7	6
(United States) M Giron	7	4	5
4	A Rublev	5	6	7

Third round
WC	(Italy) S Napolitano	2	6	4
21	(Chile) N Jarry	6	4	6
Q	(France) A Müller	3	6	6
4	A Rublev	6	3	2

Fourth round
21	(Chile) N Jarry	7	6
Q	(France) A Müller	5	3

==== Section 7 ====
First round
Q	(Belgium) Z Bergs	6	3	4
PR	(Spain) R Nadal	4	6	6
(Brazil) T Seyboth Wild	6	6
Q	(France) G Barrère	4	2
(Serbia) D Lajović	6	6^{5}	6
(Italy) L Sonego	3	7^{7}	3
(Germany) D Altmaier	4	4
(Italy) L Nardi	6	6

Second round
7	(Poland) H Hurkacz	6	6
PR	(Spain) R Nadal	1	3
(Brazil) T Seyboth Wild	3	5
25	(Argentina) TM Etcheverry	6	7
17	(Argentina) S Báez	7^{7}	7^{8}
(Serbia) D Lajović	6^{3}	6^{6}
(Italy) L Nardi	4	4
10	(Denmark) H Rune	6	6

Third round
7	(Poland) H Hurkacz	7^{9}	6
25	(Argentina) TM Etcheverry	6^{7}	2
17	(Argentina) S Báez	2	6	6
10	(Denmark) H Rune	6	2	3

Fourth round
7	(Poland) H Hurkacz	5	7^{7}	6
17	(Argentina) S Báez	7	6^{4}	4

==== Section 8 ====
First round
(United States) M McDonald	6	3	4
A Karatsev	4	6	6
(Germany) D Koepfer	6	6
WC	(Italy) A Vavassori	4	3
(Australia) A Popyrin	3	2
Q	(Serbia) H Medjedovic	6	6
(United Kingdom) J Draper	7	6
(Croatia) B Ćorić	5	1

Second round
14	(United States) T Paul	6	6
A Karatsev	4	2
(Germany) D Koepfer	6	6
22	(United States) F Tiafoe	4	2
30	(Spain) A Davidovich Fokina	6^{4}	4
Q	(Serbia) H Medjedovic	7^{7}	6
(United Kingdom) J Draper	5	4
2	D Medvedev	7	6

Third round
14	(United States) T Paul	6	6
(Germany) D Koepfer	4	3
Q	(Serbia) H Medjedovic	6^{5}	6	5
2	D Medvedev	7^{7}	2	7

Fourth round
14	(United States) T Paul	6	6
2	D Medvedev	1	4

== Seeded players ==
The following are the seeded players. Seedings are based on ATP rankings as of 6 May 2024. Rankings and points before are as of 6 May 2024.

Seed	Rank	Player	Points before	Points defending	Points earned	Points after	Status
1	1	(Serbia) Novak Djokovic	9,990	180	50	9,860	Third round lost to (Chile) Alejandro Tabilo [29]
2	4	Daniil Medvedev	7,195	1,000	100	6,295	Fourth round lost to (United States) Tommy Paul [14]
3	5	(Germany) Alexander Zverev	5,435	90	1,000	6,345	Champion, defeated (Chile) Nicolás Jarry [21]
4	6	Andrey Rublev	4,740	90	50	4,700	Third round lost to (France) Alexandre Müller [Q]
5	7	(Norway) Casper Ruud	4,535	360	10	4,185	Second round lost to (Serbia) Miomir Kecmanović
6	8	(Greece) Stefanos Tsitsipas	3,860	360	200	3,700	Quarterfinals lost to (Chile) Nicolás Jarry [21]
7	9	(Poland) Hubert Hurkacz	3,730	(45)^{†}	200	3,885	Quarterfinals lost to (United States) Tommy Paul [14]
8	10	(Bulgaria) Grigor Dimitrov	3,605	(90)^{†}	100	3,615	Fourth round lost to (United States) Taylor Fritz [11]
9	11	(Australia) Alex de Minaur	3,435	(45)^{†}	100	3,490	Fourth round lost to (Greece) Stefanos Tsitsipas [6]
10	12	(Denmark) Holger Rune	3,250	600	50	2,700	Third round lost to (Argentina) Sebastián Báez [17]
11	13	(United States) Taylor Fritz	2,870	(45)^{†}	200	3,025	Quarterfinals lost to (Germany) Alexander Zverev [3]
12	14	(United States) Ben Shelton	2,460	10	50	2,500	Third round lost to (China) Zhang Zhizhen
13	15	(France) Ugo Humbert	2,455	(175)^{‡}	0	2,280	Withdrew due to knee injury
14	16	(United States) Tommy Paul	2,300	(45)^{†}	400	2,655	Semifinals lost to (Chile) Nicolás Jarry [21]
15	17	(Kazakhstan) Alexander Bublik	2,055	45	10	2,020	Second round lost to (Portugal) Nuno Borges
16	18	Karen Khachanov	2,000	10	100	2,090	Fourth round lost to (Chile) Alejandro Tabilo [29]
17	19	(Argentina) Sebastián Báez	1,960	25+60	100+10	1,985	Fourth round lost to (Poland) Hubert Hurkacz [7]
18	20	(Canada) Félix Auger-Aliassime	1,880	10	50	1,920	Third round lost to (Australia) Alex de Minaur [9]
19	21	(France) Adrian Mannarino	1,875	(20)^{†}	10	1,865	Second round lost to (China) Zhang Zhizhen
20	22	(Argentina) Francisco Cerúndolo	1,870	180	50	1,740	Third round lost to Karen Khachanov [16]
21	24	(Chile) Nicolás Jarry	1,675	(30)^{†}	650	2,295	Runner-up, lost to (Germany) Alexander Zverev [3]
22	25	(United States) Frances Tiafoe	1,650	45	10	1,615	Second round lost to (Germany) Dominik Koepfer
23	26	(Netherlands) Tallon Griekspoor	1,595	0	10	1,605	Second round lost to (Italy) Francesco Passaro [Q]
24	27	(United States) Sebastian Korda	1,525	10	50	1,565	Third round lost to (United States) Taylor Fritz [11]
25	28	(Argentina) Tomás Martín Etcheverry	1,460	25+100	50+25	1,410	Third round lost to (Poland) Hubert Hurkacz [7]
26	29	(Italy) Lorenzo Musetti	1,405	90	10	1,325	Second round retired against (France) Térence Atmane [Q]
27	30	(United Kingdom) Cameron Norrie	1,350	90	50	1,310	Third round lost to (Greece) Stefanos Tsitsipas [6]
28	31	(Argentina) Mariano Navone	1,329	(0)^{§}	10	1,339	Second round lost to (Italy) Luciano Darderi
29	32	(Chile) Alejandro Tabilo	1,320	(75)^{^}	400	1,645	Semifinals lost to (Germany) Alexander Zverev [3]
30	33	(Spain) Alejandro Davidovich Fokina	1,315	45	10	1,280	Second round lost to (Serbia) Hamad Medjedovic [Q]
31	34	(France) Arthur Fils	1,251	41	10	1,220	Second round lost to (France) Alexandre Müller [Q]
32	35	(Australia) Jordan Thompson	1,191	(45)^{§}	10	1,156	Second round lost to (Brazil) Thiago Monteiro [Q]

† The player's 2023 points were replaced by a better result for purposes of his ranking as of 6 May 2024. Points for his 19th best result will be deducted instead.
‡ The player's 2023 points were replaced by a better result for purposes of his ranking as of 6 May 2024. He is defending points from an ATP Challenger Tour event held during the second week of the 2023 tournament instead.
§ The player did not qualify for the main draw in 2023. Points for his 19th best result will be deducted instead.
^ The player did not qualify for the main draw in 2023. He is defending points from an ATP Challenger Tour event instead.

=== Withdrawn players ===
The following players would have been seeded, but withdrew before the tournament began.

Rank	Player	Points before	Points dropped	Points after	Withdrawal reason
2	(Italy) Jannik Sinner	8,860	90	8,770	Hip injury
3	(Spain) Carlos Alcaraz	7,345	45	7,300	Right forearm injury
23	(Czech Republic) Jiří Lehečka	1,695	10	1,685	Lower back injury

== Other entry information ==
=== Wildcards ===
- (Italy) Fabio Fognini
- (Italy) Matteo Gigante
- (Italy) Stefano Napolitano
- (Italy) Andrea Vavassori
- (Italy) Giulio Zeppieri

=== Protected ranking ===
- (Spain) Rafael Nadal
- (Canada) Denis Shapovalov

=== Withdrawals ===
- ‡ (Spain) Carlos Alcaraz → replaced by (Australia) Rinky Hijikata
- § (Italy) Matteo Berrettini → replaced by (United States) J. J. Wolf
- ‡ (France) Arthur Cazaux → replaced by (Switzerland) Stan Wawrinka
- ‡ (Argentina) Facundo Díaz Acosta → replaced by (United States) Mackenzie McDonald
- ‡ (Serbia) Laslo Djere → replaced by (Colombia) Daniel Elahi Galán
- § (France) Ugo Humbert → replaced by (China) Shang Juncheng
- ‡ (Czech Republic) Jiří Lehečka → replaced by (Italy) Matteo Berrettini
- § (Czech Republic) Tomáš Macháč → replaced by (France) Harold Mayot
- ‡ (United Kingdom) Andy Murray → replaced by (Argentina) Pedro Cachín
- ‡ (Italy) Jannik Sinner → replaced by (France) Arthur Rinderknech
- § (Switzerland) Stan Wawrinka → replaced by (France) Corentin Moutet

‡ – withdrew from entry list
§ – withdrew from main draw

== Qualifying ==
=== Seeds ===
1. (United States) Brandon Nakashima (qualified)
2. (Argentina) Federico Coria (first round)
3. (Japan) Taro Daniel (first round)
4. (France) Corentin Moutet (qualifying competition, lucky loser)
5. (Chile) Cristian Garín (first round)
6. (Australia) Thanasi Kokkinakis (first round)
7. (France) Hugo Gaston (first round)
8. (United States) Aleksandar Kovacevic (first round)
9. (Germany) Maximilian Marterer (qualified)
10. (United States) J. J. Wolf (qualifying competition, lucky loser)
11. (Belgium) Zizou Bergs (qualified)
12. (Argentina) Thiago Agustín Tirante (first round)
13. (Spain) Albert Ramos Viñolas (first round)
14. (Peru) Juan Pablo Varillas (first round)
15. (Argentina) Camilo Ugo Carabelli (first round)
16. (France) Grégoire Barrère (qualified)
17. (France) Alexandre Müller (qualified)
18. (China) Shang Juncheng (qualifying competition, lucky loser)
19. (France) Harold Mayot (qualifying competition, lucky loser)
20. (Netherlands) Botic van de Zandschulp (qualified)
21. (France) Richard Gasquet (qualifying competition)
22. (Austria) Jurij Rodionov (first round)
23. (Brazil) Thiago Monteiro (qualified)
24. (Croatia) Duje Ajduković (qualifying competition)

=== Qualifiers ===
1. (United States) Brandon Nakashima
2. (United States) Nicolas Moreno de Alboran
3. (France) Alexandre Müller
4. (Brazil) Thiago Monteiro
5. (Argentina) Diego Schwartzman
6. (France) Térence Atmane
7. (France) Grégoire Barrère
8. (Italy) Francesco Passaro
9. (Germany) Maximilian Marterer
10. (Serbia) Hamad Medjedovic
11. (Belgium) Zizou Bergs
12. (Netherlands) Botic van de Zandschulp

=== Lucky losers ===
1. (France) Corentin Moutet
2. (United States) J. J. Wolf
3. (France) Harold Mayot
4. (China) Shang Juncheng

=== Qualifying draw ===
==== First qualifier ====
First round
1	(United States) Brandon Nakashima	7^{7}	7
Alt	(Bosnia and Herzegovina) Nerman Fatić	6^{5}	5
(Netherlands) Jesper de Jong	6	2	6
22	(Austria) Jurij Rodionov	3	6	4

Qualifying competition
1	(United States) Brandon Nakashima	6	4	6
(Netherlands) Jesper de Jong	4	6	4

==== Second qualifier ====
First round
2	(Argentina) Federico Coria	3	7	6^{3}
(Czech Republic) Vít Kopřiva	6	5	7^{7}
(United States) Nicolas Moreno de Alboran	6	7
14	(Peru) Juan Pablo Varillas	4	5

Qualifying competition
(Czech Republic) Vít Kopřiva	4	6	3
(United States) Nicolas Moreno de Alboran	6	3	6

==== Third qualifier ====
First round
3	(Japan) Taro Daniel	4	6	1
(Moldova) Radu Albot	6	0	6
(United States) Emilio Nava	6	1	4
17	(France) Alexandre Müller	4	6	6

Qualifying competition
(Moldova) Radu Albot	5	2
17	(France) Alexandre Müller	7	6

==== Fourth qualifier ====
First round
4	(France) Corentin Moutet	6	6
(Bosnia and Herzegovina) Damir Džumhur	1	3
WC	(Italy) Giovanni Oradini	4	4
23	(Brazil) Thiago Monteiro	6	6

Qualifying competition
4	(France) Corentin Moutet	3	4
23	(Brazil) Thiago Monteiro	6	6

==== Fifth qualifier ====
First round
5	(Chile) Cristian Garín	7	6^{9}	6^{2}
(Kazakhstan) Mikhail Kukushkin	5	7^{11}	7^{7}
(Argentina) Diego Schwartzman	6	3	7
13	(Spain) Albert Ramos Viñolas	1	6	5

Qualifying competition
(Kazakhstan) Mikhail Kukushkin	6	2	3
(Argentina) Diego Schwartzman	4	6	6

==== Sixth qualifier ====
First round
6	(Australia) Thanasi Kokkinakis	5	6^{5}
(France) Térence Atmane	7	7^{7}
(Monaco) Valentin Vacherot	3	3
19	(France) Harold Mayot	6	6

Qualifying competition
(France) Térence Atmane	6	2	6
19	(France) Harold Mayot	3	6	2

==== Seventh qualifier ====
First round
7	(France) Hugo Gaston	3	6	1
(Brazil) Felipe Meligeni Alves	6	3	6
Alt	(France) Giovanni Mpetshi Perricard	3	5
16	(France) Grégoire Barrère	6	7

Qualifying competition
(Brazil) Felipe Meligeni Alves	3	6^{7}
16	(France) Grégoire Barrère	6	7^{9}

==== Eighth qualifier ====
First round
8	(United States) Aleksandar Kovacevic	5	5
WC	(Italy) Francesco Passaro	7	7
(Hungary) Zsombor Piros	6^{2}	6	2
24	(Croatia) Duje Ajduković	7^{7}	3	6

Qualifying competition
WC	(Italy) Francesco Passaro	7^{7}	6^{6}	7^{7}
24	(Croatia) Duje Ajduković	6^{5}	7^{8}	6^{3}

==== Ninth qualifier ====
First round
9	(Germany) Maximilian Marterer	4	6	7
WC	(Italy) Andrea Picchione	6	3	5
WC	(Italy) Samuel Vincent Ruggeri	1	5
21	(France) Richard Gasquet	6	7

Qualifying competition
9	(Germany) Maximilian Marterer	6	6
21	(France) Richard Gasquet	3	4

==== Tenth qualifier ====
First round
10	(United States) J. J. Wolf	4	7^{7}	6
(Spain) Bernabé Zapata Miralles	6	6^{5}	1
(Serbia) Hamad Medjedovic	7^{7}	6
15	(Argentina) Camilo Ugo Carabelli	6^{1}	2

Qualifying competition
10	(United States) J. J. Wolf	1	4
(Serbia) Hamad Medjedovic	6	6

==== Eleventh qualifier ====
First round
11	(Belgium) Zizou Bergs	4	6	6
(United States) Patrick Kypson	6	3	4
WC	(Italy) Francesco Maestrelli	1	6	3
18	(China) Shang Juncheng	6	3	6

Qualifying competition
11	(Belgium) Zizou Bergs	6	7^{7}
18	(China) Shang Juncheng	4	6^{5}

==== Twelfth qualifier ====
First round
12	(Argentina) Thiago Agustín Tirante	6^{8}	6^{5}
(Argentina) Facundo Bagnis	7^{10}	7^{7}
(United States) Zachary Svajda	2	2
20	(Netherlands) Botic van de Zandschulp	6	6

Qualifying competition
(Argentina) Facundo Bagnis	3	1
20	(Netherlands) Botic van de Zandschulp	6	6
