= 2025 Australian Open – Men's singles =

Tennis championship

Men's singles
- 2025 Australian Open

Final
- Champion: (Italy) Jannik Sinner
- Runner-up: (Germany) Alexander Zverev
- Score: 6–3, 7–6^{(7–4)}, 6–3

Details
- Draw: 128
- Seeds: 32

Events
Singles	men	women		boys	girls
Doubles	men	women	mixed	boys	girls
WC Singles	men	women	quad	boys	girls
WC Doubles	men	women	quad	boys	girls

Qualification
Singles	men	women
- Australian Open

Defending champion Jannik Sinner defeated Alexander Zverev in the final, 6–3, 7–6^{(7–4)}, 6–3 to win the men's singles tennis title at the 2025 Australian Open. It was his second Australian Open title and third major title overall. Sinner was the youngest man to defend the title since Jim Courier in 1993, and the youngest to defend his first major title since Rafael Nadal at the 2006 French Open.

Novak Djokovic retired in his semifinal match against Zverev due to injury. Djokovic's second-round match marked his 430th career major main draw singles match, surpassing Roger Federer's all-time record. Carlos Alcaraz was vying to become the youngest man to complete the career Grand Slam in singles, but he lost to Djokovic in the quarterfinals. Alcaraz would go on to accomplish the feat the following year.

João Fonseca was the first teenager to defeat a top-10 opponent on their major debut since Mario Ančić defeated Federer at the 2002 Wimbledon Championships. Learner Tien was the youngest man to reach the fourth round at the Australian Open since Nadal in 2005. With the victories of Fonseca, Tien and Jakub Menšík over top-10-ranked opponents, this marked the third occasion in which three different teenagers had accomplished the feat at a major (after the 1990 and 2006 French Opens).

With his victory over fourth seed Taylor Fritz in the third round, Gaël Monfils at 38 years old, was the oldest man to defeat a top-5 seeded opponent at a major since Ken Rosewall defeated John Newcombe at the 1974 US Open, and the oldest to do so at the Australian Open since the introduction of the ATP rankings.

Hady Habib became the first Lebanese player, male or female, to qualify for and win a match in the main draw of a major in the Open Era.

This tournament was the last main draw grand slam appearance for former world number 4 and US Open finalist Kei Nishikori.

== Seeds ==
1. (Italy) Jannik Sinner (champion)
2. (Germany) Alexander Zverev (final)
3. (Spain) Carlos Alcaraz (quarterfinals)
4. (United States) Taylor Fritz (third round)
5. Daniil Medvedev (second round)
6. (Norway) Casper Ruud (second round)
7. (Serbia) Novak Djokovic (semifinals, retired)
8. (Australia) Alex de Minaur (quarterfinals)
9. Andrey Rublev (first round)
10. (Bulgaria) Grigor Dimitrov (first round, retired)
11. (Greece) Stefanos Tsitsipas (first round)
12. (United States) Tommy Paul (quarterfinals)
13. (Denmark) Holger Rune (fourth round)
14. (France) Ugo Humbert (fourth round)
15. (United Kingdom) Jack Draper (fourth round, retired)
16. (Italy) Lorenzo Musetti (third round)
17. (United States) Frances Tiafoe (second round)
18. (Poland) Hubert Hurkacz (second round)
19. Karen Khachanov (third round)
20. (France) Arthur Fils (third round, retired)
21. (United States) Ben Shelton (semifinals)
22. (United States) Sebastian Korda (second round)
23. (Chile) Alejandro Tabilo (first round)
24. (Czech Republic) Jiří Lehečka (fourth round)
25. (Australia) Alexei Popyrin (first round)
26. (Czech Republic) Tomáš Macháč (third round)
27. (Australia) Jordan Thompson (second round)
28. (Argentina) Sebastián Báez (first round)
29. (Canada) Félix Auger-Aliassime (second round)
30. (France) Giovanni Mpetshi Perricard (first round)
31. (Argentina) Francisco Cerúndolo (third round)
32. (Italy) Flavio Cobolli (first round)

Click on the seed number of a player to go to their draw section.

== Draw ==
Key

- Q = Qualifier
- WC = Wild card
- LL = Lucky loser
- Alt = Alternate
- ITF = ITF entry
- PR = Protected ranking
- SR = Special ranking
- SE = Special exempt
- JE = Junior exempt
- JR = Junior Accelerator Programme entrant
- CO = College Accelerator Programme entrant
- NG = Next Gen Accelerator Program entrant
- w/o = Walkover
- r = Retired
- d = Defaulted

=== Finals ===
Quarterfinals
1	(Italy) Jannik Sinner	6	6	6
8	(Australia) Alex de Minaur	3	2	1
21	(United States) Ben Shelton	6	7	4	7^{7}
(Italy) Lorenzo Sonego	4	5	6	6^{4}
7	(Serbia) Novak Djokovic	4	6	6	6
3	(Spain) Carlos Alcaraz	6	4	3	4
12	(United States) Tommy Paul	6^{1}	6^{0}	6	1
2	(Germany) Alexander Zverev	7^{7}	7^{7}	2	6

Semifinals
1	(Italy) Jannik Sinner	7^{7}	6	6
21	(United States) Ben Shelton	6^{2}	2	2
7	(Serbia) Novak Djokovic	6^{5}	0^{r}
2	(Germany) Alexander Zverev	7^{7}	0

Final
1	(Italy) Jannik Sinner	6	7^{7}	6
2	(Germany) Alexander Zverev	3	6^{4}	3

=== Top half ===
==== Section 1 ====
First round
1	(Italy) J Sinner	7^{7}	7^{7}	6
(Chile) N Jarry	6^{2}	6^{5}	1
WC	(Australia) T Schoolkate	6^{6}	7^{7}	6	6
(Japan) T Daniel	7^{8}	6^{4}	1	4
(United States) M Giron	2	7	6	7
(Germany) Y Hanfmann	6	5	1	5
(Argentina) TM Etcheverry	6^{8}	6	7	6
32	(Italy) F Cobolli	7^{10}	3	5	1
18	(Poland) H Hurkacz	7	6	6
(Netherlands) T Griekspoor	5	4	4
(Serbia) M Kecmanović	7	3	6	3	6
(Serbia) D Lajović	5	6	3	6	3
(Italy) M Berrettini	6^{4}	6	6	6
(United Kingdom) C Norrie	7^{7}	4	1	3
(China) Z Zhang	6	3	4	6	4
13	(Denmark) H Rune	4	6	6	3	6

Second round
1	(Italy) J Sinner	4	6	6	6
WC	(Australia) T Schoolkate	6	4	1	3
(United States) M Giron	7	3	7	3	6
(Argentina) TM Etcheverry	5	6	5	6	4
18	(Poland) H Hurkacz	4	4	2
(Serbia) M Kecmanović	6	6	6
(Italy) M Berrettini	6^{3}	6	3	6^{6}
13	(Denmark) H Rune	7^{7}	2	6	7^{8}

Third round
1	(Italy) J Sinner	6	6	6
(United States) M Giron	3	4	2
(Serbia) M Kecmanović	7^{7}	3	6	4	4
13	(Denmark) H Rune	6^{5}	6	4	6	6

Fourth round
1	(Italy) J Sinner	6	3	6	6
13	(Denmark) H Rune	3	6	3	2

==== Section 2 ====
First round
11	(Greece) S Tsitsipas	5	3	6	4
(United States) A Michelsen	7	6	2	6
WC	(Australia) J McCabe	6	6	6
Q	(Spain) M Landaluce	4	3	4
(Canada) G Diallo	6^{1}	7^{7}	5	6	6
(Italy) L Nardi	7^{7}	6^{3}	7	1	2
(France) A Mannarino	6^{5}	3	3
19	K Khachanov	7^{7}	6	6
31	(Argentina) F Cerúndolo	7^{7}	6	6
(Kazakhstan) A Bublik	6^{1}	3	2
(Argentina) F Díaz Acosta	6^{5}	6	1	6	6
(Belgium) Z Bergs	7^{7}	4	6	3	4
Q	(United States) T Boyer	6	6^{3}	4	7	6
(Argentina) F Coria	3	7^{7}	6	5	1
(Netherlands) B van de Zandschulp	1	5	4
8	(Australia) A de Minaur	6	7	6

Second round
(United States) A Michelsen	7	6	7^{7}
WC	(Australia) J McCabe	5	3	6^{4}
(Canada) G Diallo	6^{4}	6	3	3
19	K Khachanov	7^{7}	4	6	6
31	(Argentina) F Cerúndolo	6	1
(Argentina) F Díaz Acosta	2	0^{r}
Q	(United States) T Boyer	2	4	3
8	(Australia) A de Minaur	6	6	6

Third round
(United States) A Michelsen	6	7^{7}	6
19	K Khachanov	3	6^{5}	2
31	(Argentina) F Cerúndolo	7	6^{3}	3	3
8	(Australia) A de Minaur	5	7^{7}	6	6

Fourth round
(United States) A Michelsen	0	6^{5}	3
8	(Australia) A de Minaur	6	7^{7}	6

==== Section 3 ====
First round
4	(United States) T Fritz	6	6	6
PR	(United States) J Brooksby	2	0	3
(Croatia) B Ćorić	5	1	2
Q	(Chile) C Garín	7	6	6
(Argentina) F Comesaña	2	6	6^{4}	6	4
(Germany) D Altmaier	6	3	7^{7}	4	6
(France) G Monfils	7^{9}	6	6^{6}	6^{5}	6
30	(France) G Mpetshi Perricard	6^{7}	3	7^{8}	7^{7}	4
21	(United States) B Shelton	7^{7}	7	7
(United States) B Nakashima	6^{3}	5	5
PR	(Spain) P Carreño Busta	6	6	6
Q	(Poland) K Majchrzak	4	4	3
(Spain) R Bautista Agut	6	4	4	6^{8}
(Canada) D Shapovalov	3	6	6	7^{10}
(Italy) M Arnaldi	6^{4}	6	6^{5}	3
16	(Italy) L Musetti	7^{7}	4	7^{7}	6

Second round
4	(United States) T Fritz	6	6	6
Q	(Chile) C Garín	2	1	0
(Germany) D Altmaier	5	3	6^{3}
(France) G Monfils	7	6	7^{7}
21	(United States) B Shelton	6	6	6^{4}	6
PR	(Spain) P Carreño Busta	3	3	7^{7}	4
(Canada) D Shapovalov	6^{3}	6^{6}	2
16	(Italy) L Musetti	7^{7}	7^{8}	6

Third round
4	(United States) T Fritz	6	5	6^{1}	4
(France) G Monfils	3	7	7^{7}	6
21	(United States) B Shelton	6	3	6	7^{7}
16	(Italy) L Musetti	3	6	4	6^{5}

Fourth round
(France) G Monfils	6^{3}	7^{7}	6^{2}	0^{r}
21	(United States) B Shelton	7^{7}	6^{3}	7^{7}	1

==== Section 4 ====
First round
9	A Rublev	6^{1}	3	6^{5}
Q	(Brazil) J Fonseca	7^{7}	6	7^{7}
(Italy) L Sonego	6	5	7	7
WC	(Switzerland) S Wawrinka	4	7	5	5
(Brazil) T Seyboth Wild	3	7^{7}	5	7	5
(Hungary) F Marozsán	6	6^{5}	7	5	7
(France) A Rinderknech	6^{2}	3	6	7^{7}	3
17	(United States) F Tiafoe	7^{7}	6	4	6^{4}	6
25	(Australia) A Popyrin	6	3	4	4
(France) C Moutet	4	6	6	6
(Australia) R Hijikata	4	4	3
Q	(United States) M Krueger	6	6	6
(Argentina) C Ugo Carabelli	6	6^{3}	3	7	4
Q	(United States) L Tien	4	7^{7}	6	5	6
WC	(Thailand) K Samrej	2	6	6	1	2
5	D Medvedev	6	4	3	6	6

Second round
Q	(Brazil) J Fonseca	7^{8}	3	1	6	3
(Italy) L Sonego	6^{6}	6	6	3	6
(Hungary) F Marozsán	6^{3}	6	3	6	6
17	(United States) F Tiafoe	7^{7}	4	6	4	1
(France) C Moutet	4	6	7^{7}	6
Q	(United States) M Krueger	6	4	6^{3}	4
Q	(United States) L Tien	6	7^{7}	6^{8}	1	7^{10}
5	D Medvedev	3	6^{4}	7^{10}	6	6^{7}

Third round
(Italy) L Sonego	6^{3}	7^{8}	6	6
(Hungary) F Marozsán	7^{7}	6^{6}	1	2
(France) C Moutet	6^{10}	3	3
Q	(United States) L Tien	7^{12}	6	6

Fourth round
(Italy) L Sonego	6	6	3	6
Q	(United States) L Tien	3	2	6	1

=== Bottom half ===
==== Section 5 ====
First round
7	(Serbia) N Djokovic	4	6	6	6
WC	(United States) N Basavareddy	6	3	4	2
Q	(Portugal) J Faria	6	6	7
P Kotov	1	1	5
Q	(Belgium) G Onclin	6	6^{4}	3	2
PR	(United States) R Opelka	3	7^{7}	6	6
(India) S Nagal	3	1	5
26	(Czech Republic) T Macháč	6	6	7
24	(Czech Republic) J Lehečka	6	3	6	7^{7}
WC	(Australia) L Tu	1	6	3	6^{1}
(France) H Gaston	6	3	6	6
WC	(Australia) O Jasika	2	6	2	2
(Belgium) D Goffin	1	2	6^{7}
(France) B Bonzi	6	6	7^{9}
LL	(Italy) F Passaro	7	2
10	(Bulgaria) G Dimitrov	5	1^{r}

Second round
7	(Serbia) N Djokovic	6	6^{4}	6	6
Q	(Portugal) J Faria	1	7^{7}	3	2
PR	(United States) R Opelka	6	6^{1}	7^{7}	6^{4}	4
26	(Czech Republic) T Macháč	3	7^{7}	6^{5}	7^{7}	6
24	(Czech Republic) J Lehečka	6	3
(France) H Gaston	3	1^{r}
(France) B Bonzi	6	6	3	6
LL	(Italy) F Passaro	2	4	6	4

Third round
7	(Serbia) N Djokovic	6	6	6
26	(Czech Republic) T Macháč	1	4	4
24	(Czech Republic) J Lehečka	6	6	6
(France) B Bonzi	2	3	3

Fourth round
7	(Serbia) N Djokovic	6	6	7^{7}
24	(Czech Republic) J Lehečka	3	4	6^{4}

==== Section 6 ====
First round
15	(United Kingdom) J Draper	4	6	3	6	6
(Argentina) M Navone	6	3	6	3	2
(Australia) T Kokkinakis	3	6	6	7^{7}
R Safiullin	6	3	3	6^{5}
(Bosnia and Herzegovina) D Džumhur	7^{7}	0	6	3	4
(Australia) A Vukic	6^{3}	6	3	6	6
Q	(Slovakia) L Klein	3	6	3	6^{6}
22	(United States) S Korda	6	0	6	7^{8}
27	(Australia) J Thompson	7^{7}	6	4	6
Q	(Germany) D Koepfer	6^{3}	4	6	3
(France) A Müller	7^{7}	3	2	5
(Portugal) N Borges	6^{2}	6	6	7
(Japan) Y Nishioka	3	6	7^{7}	6
Q	(Tunisia) A Dougaz	6	4	6^{3}	3
(Kazakhstan) A Shevchenko	1	5	1
3	(Spain) C Alcaraz	6	7	6

Second round
15	(United Kingdom) J Draper	6^{3}	6	3	7	6
(Australia) T Kokkinakis	7^{7}	3	6	5	3
(Australia) A Vukic	6	3	2	6	7
22	(United States) S Korda	4	6	6	3	5
27	(Australia) J Thompson	3	2	4
(Portugal) N Borges	6	6	6
(Japan) Y Nishioka	0	1	4
3	(Spain) C Alcaraz	6	6	6

Third round
15	(United Kingdom) J Draper	6	2	5	7^{7}	7^{10}
(Australia) A Vukic	4	6	7	6^{5}	6^{8}
(Portugal) N Borges	2	4	7^{7}	2
3	(Spain) C Alcaraz	6	6	6^{3}	6

Fourth round
15	(United Kingdom) J Draper	5	1	0^{r}
3	(Spain) C Alcaraz	7	6	0

==== Section 7 ====
First round
6	(Norway) C Ruud	6	1	7	2	6
(Spain) J Munar	3	6	5	6	1
Q	(Georgia (country)) N Basilashvili	1	7^{7}	3	3
(Czech Republic) J Menšík	6	6^{3}	6	6
(China) J Shang	6^{1}	2^{r}
(Spain) A Davidovich Fokina	7^{7}	5
(Germany) J-L Struff	3	0	6	1
29	(Canada) F Auger-Aliassime	6	6	4	6
23	(Chile) A Tabilo	6	2	3	6^{1}
(Spain) R Carballés Baena	1	6	6	7^{7}
(Australia) J Duckworth	6	6	6
PR	(Switzerland) D Stricker	2	4	2
PR	(Japan) K Nishikori	4	6^{4}	7	6	6
Q	(Brazil) T Monteiro	6	7^{7}	5	2	3
(Australia) C O'Connell	2	6	1	7^{7}	5
12	(United States) T Paul	6	3	6	6^{5}	7

Second round
6	(Norway) C Ruud	2	6	1	4
(Czech Republic) J Menšík	6	3	6	6
(Spain) A Davidovich Fokina	6^{7}	6^{5}	6	6	6
29	(Canada) F Auger-Aliassime	7^{9}	7^{7}	4	1	3
(Spain) R Carballés Baena	6	6	7
(Australia) J Duckworth	4	2	5
PR	(Japan) K Nishikori	7^{7}	0	3	1
12	(United States) T Paul	6^{3}	6	6	6

Third round
(Czech Republic) J Menšík	6	6	6^{7}	4	2
(Spain) A Davidovich Fokina	3	4	7^{9}	6	6
(Spain) R Carballés Baena	6^{0}	2	0
12	(United States) T Paul	7^{7}	6	6

Fourth round
(Spain) A Davidovich Fokina	1	1	1
12	(United States) T Paul	6	6	6

==== Section 8 ====
First round
14	(France) U Humbert	7^{7}	7	6
Q	(Italy) M Gigante	6^{5}	5	4
Q	(Lebanon) H Habib	7^{7}	6	7^{8}
(China) Y Bu	6^{4}	4	6^{6}
(Australia) A Walton	6	6	4	6^{4}	5
(France) Q Halys	4	4	6	7^{7}	7
(Finland) O Virtanen	6	6^{4}	4	4
20	(France) A Fils	3	7^{7}	6	6
28	(Argentina) S Báez	3	7	6	0	3
(France) A Cazaux	6	5	3	6	6
(United Kingdom) J Fearnley	7^{7}	6	7^{7}
PR	(Australia) N Kyrgios	6^{3}	3	6^{2}
(Spain) P Martínez	6	4
(Italy) L Darderi	3	1^{r}
WC	(France) L Pouille	4	4	4
2	(Germany) A Zverev	6	6	6

Second round
14	(France) U Humbert	6	6	6
Q	(Lebanon) H Habib	3	4	4
(France) Q Halys	2	6	6^{2}	5
20	(France) A Fils	6	4	7^{7}	7
(France) A Cazaux	6	5	2	3
(United Kingdom) J Fearnley	3	7	6	6
(Spain) P Martínez	1	4	1
2	(Germany) A Zverev	6	6	6

Third round
14	(France) U Humbert	4	7	6	1
20	(France) A Fils	6	5	4	0^{r}
(United Kingdom) J Fearnley	3	4	4
2	(Germany) A Zverev	6	6	6

Fourth round
14	(France) U Humbert	1	6	3	2
2	(Germany) A Zverev	6	2	6	6

== Seeded players ==
The following are the seeded players. Seedings are based on ATP rankings as of 6 January 2025. Rankings and points before are as of 13 January 2025.

Seed	Rank	Player	Points before	Points defending	Points won	Points after	Status
1	1	(Italy) Jannik Sinner	11,830	2,000	2,000	11,830	Champion, defeated (Germany) Alexander Zverev [2]
2	2	(Germany) Alexander Zverev	7,635	800	1,300	8,135	Final lost to (Italy) Jannik Sinner [1]
3	3	(Spain) Carlos Alcaraz	7,010	400	400	7,010	Quarterfinals lost to (Serbia) Novak Djokovic [7]
4	4	(United States) Taylor Fritz	5,350	400	100	5,050	Third round lost to (France) Gaël Monfils
5	5	Daniil Medvedev	5,030	1,300	50	3,780	Second round lost to (United States) Learner Tien [Q]
6	6	(Norway) Casper Ruud	4,210	100	50	4,160	Second round lost to (Czech Republic) Jakub Menšík
7	7	(Serbia) Novak Djokovic	3,900	800	800	3,900	Semifinals retired against (Germany) Alexander Zverev [2]
8	8	(Australia) Alex de Minaur	3,535	200	400	3,735	Quarterfinals lost to (Italy) Jannik Sinner [1]
9	9	Andrey Rublev	3,520	400	10	3,130	First round lost to (Brazil) João Fonseca [Q]
10	10	(Bulgaria) Grigor Dimitrov	3,200	100	10	3,110	First round retired against (Italy) Francesco Passaro [LL]
11	12	(Greece) Stefanos Tsitsipas	3,195	200	10	3,005	First round lost to (United States) Alex Michelsen
12	11	(United States) Tommy Paul	3,195	100	400	3,495	Quarterfinals lost to (Germany) Alexander Zverev [2]
13	13	(Denmark) Holger Rune	2,910	50	200	3,060	Fourth round lost to (Italy) Jannik Sinner [1]
14	14	(France) Ugo Humbert	2,765	100	200	2,865	Fourth round lost to (Germany) Alexander Zverev [2]
15	18	(United Kingdom) Jack Draper	2,530	50	200	2,680	Fourth round retired against (Spain) Carlos Alcaraz [3]
16	15	(Italy) Lorenzo Musetti	2,600	50	100	2,650	Third round lost to (United States) Ben Shelton [21]
17	16	(United States) Frances Tiafoe	2,560	50	50	2,560	Second round lost to (Hungary) Fábián Marozsán
18	17	(Poland) Hubert Hurkacz	2,555	400	50	2,205	Second round lost to (Serbia) Miomir Kecmanović
19	19	Karen Khachanov	2,410	200	100	2,310	Third round lost to (United States) Alex Michelsen
20	21	(France) Arthur Fils	2,280	50	100	2,330	Third round retired against (France) Ugo Humbert [14]
21	20	(United States) Ben Shelton	2,280	100	800	2,980	Semifinals lost to (Italy) Jannik Sinner [1]
22	22	(United States) Sebastian Korda	2,065	100	50	2,015	Second round lost to (Australia) Aleksandar Vukic
23	26	(Chile) Alejandro Tabilo	1,705	10	10	1,705	First round lost to (Spain) Roberto Carballés Baena
24	29	(Czech Republic) Jiří Lehečka	1,660	50	200	1,810	Fourth round lost to (Serbia) Novak Djokovic [7]
25	24	(Australia) Alexei Popyrin	1,840	50	10	1,800	First round lost to (France) Corentin Moutet
26	25	(Czech Republic) Tomáš Macháč	1,805	100	100	1,805	Third round lost to (Serbia) Novak Djokovic [7]
27	27	(Australia) Jordan Thompson	1,695	50	50	1,695	Second round lost to (Portugal) Nuno Borges
28	28	(Argentina) Sebastián Báez	1,690	100	10	1,600	First round lost to (France) Arthur Cazaux
29	23	(Canada) Félix Auger-Aliassime	1,905	100	50	1,855	Second round lost to (Spain) Alejandro Davidovich Fokina
30	30	(France) Giovanni Mpetshi Perricard	1,651	16	10	1,645	First round lost to (France) Gaël Monfils
31	31	(Argentina) Francisco Cerúndolo	1,620	50	100	1,670	Third round lost to (Australia) Alex de Minaur [8]
32	32	(Italy) Flavio Cobolli	1,512	130	10	1,392	First round lost to (Argentina) Tomás Martín Etcheverry

== Other entry information ==
=== Wildcards ===
- (United States) Nishesh Basavareddy
- (Australia) Omar Jasika
- (Australia) James McCabe
- (France) Lucas Pouille
- (Thailand) Kasidit Samrej
- (Australia) Tristan Schoolkate
- (Australia) Li Tu
- (Switzerland) Stan Wawrinka

=== Protected ranking ===
- (Spain) Pablo Carreño Busta (18)
- (Australia) Nick Kyrgios (21)
- (United States) Reilly Opelka (33)
- (Japan) Kei Nishikori (48)
- (United States) Jenson Brooksby (52)
- (Switzerland) Dominic Stricker (94)

=== Qualifiers ===
- (Georgia (country)) Nikoloz Basilashvili
- (United States) Tristan Boyer
- (Tunisia) Aziz Dougaz
- (Portugal) Jaime Faria
- (Brazil) João Fonseca
- (Chile) Cristian Garín
- (Italy) Matteo Gigante
- (Lebanon) Hady Habib
- (Slovakia) Lukáš Klein
- (Germany) Dominik Koepfer
- (United States) Mitchell Krueger
- (Spain) Martín Landaluce
- (Poland) Kamil Majchrzak
- (Brazil) Thiago Monteiro
- (Belgium) Gauthier Onclin
- (United States) Learner Tien

=== Lucky loser ===
- (Italy) Francesco Passaro

=== Withdrawals ===
The entry list was released by Tennis Australia based on the ATP rankings for the week of 2 December 2024.

- ‡ (Austria) Sebastian Ofner (88) → replaced by (United Kingdom) Jacob Fearnley (99)
- ‡ (Finland) Emil Ruusuvuori (95) → replaced by (Argentina) Federico Coria (100)
- § (Italy) Fabio Fognini (91) → replaced by (Italy) Francesco Passaro (LL)

‡ – withdrew from entry list
§ – withdrew from main draw

== See also ==
- 2025 Australian Open – Women's singles

Preceded by 2024 US Open – Men's singles	Grand Slam men's singles	Succeeded by 2025 French Open – Men's singles
