= 2024 Piemonte Open – Singles =

Singles
- 2024 Piemonte Open

Final
- Champion: (Italy) Francesco Passaro
- Runner-up: (Italy) Lorenzo Musetti
- Score: 6–3, 7–5

Events
Singles	Doubles
← 2023 ·	Piemonte Open	· 2025 →

Francesco Passaro won the title after defeating Lorenzo Musetti 6–3, 7–5 in the final.

Dominik Koepfer was the defending champion but chose not to defend his title.

== Seeds ==
The top four seeds received a bye into the second round.

1. (Italy) Lorenzo Musetti (final)
2. (Argentina) Mariano Navone (second round)
3. (Italy) Matteo Arnaldi (quarterfinals)
4. (Italy) Lorenzo Sonego (semifinals)
5. (Italy) Luciano Darderi (semifinals)
6. (Italy) Flavio Cobolli (withdrew)
7. (Germany) Yannick Hanfmann (second round)
8. (Brazil) Thiago Seyboth Wild (first round)

== Draw ==
=== Key ===
- Q = Qualifier
- WC = Wild card
- LL = Lucky loser
- Alt = Alternate
- SE = Special exempt
- PR = Protected ranking
- ITF = ITF entry
- JE = Junior exempt
- w/o = Walkover
- r = Retired
- d = Defaulted
- SR = Special ranking

=== Finals ===
Semifinals
1	(Italy) Lorenzo Musetti	7	7^{10}
5/WC	(Italy) Luciano Darderi	5	6^{8}
4	(Italy) Lorenzo Sonego	3	2
WC	(Italy) Francesco Passaro	6	6

Final
1	(Italy) Lorenzo Musetti	3	5
WC	(Italy) Francesco Passaro	6	7

=== Top half ===
First round
(Belgium) D Goffin	7	6
Alt	(Peru) JP Varillas	5	4
Alt	(Argentina) TA Tirante	6	3	1
Q	(Brazil) F Meligeni Alves	4	6	6
Q	(Italy) M Bellucci	4	2
Q	(Italy) F Maestrelli	6	6
(Italy) F Fognini	6	6
LL	(Italy) G Zeppieri	2	3
Q	(Switzerland) M-A Hüsler	7^{7}	3	6
(France) C Moutet	6^{3}	6	2
Alt	(Argentina) C Ugo Carabelli	4	3
5/WC	(Italy) L Darderi	6	6

Second round
1	(Italy) L Musetti	6	6
(Belgium) D Goffin	4	3
Q	(Brazil) F Meligeni Alves	6	4	7^{7}
Q	(Italy) F Maestrelli	3	6	6^{4}
3/WC	(Italy) M Arnaldi	6	6
(Italy) F Fognini	3	4
Q	(Switzerland) M-A Hüsler	6	3	1
5/WC	(Italy) L Darderi	2	6	6

Quarterfinals
1	(Italy) L Musetti	6	6
Q	(Brazil) F Meligeni Alves	1	3
3/WC	(Italy) M Arnaldi	2	6	3
5/WC	(Italy) L Darderi	6	2	6

Semifinals
1	(Italy) L Musetti	7	7^{10}
5/WC	(Italy) L Darderi	5	6^{8}

=== Bottom half ===
First round
7	(Germany) Y Hanfmann	6	0
(Germany) M Marterer	4	1^{r}
(Italy) L Nardi	7	5	6^{2}
Alt	(United States) JJ Wolf	5	7	7^{7}
Alt	(Austria) J Rodionov	3	6	2
(Argentina) F Coria	6	4	6
8	(Brazil) T Seyboth Wild	7^{7}	3	5
(Finland) E Ruusuvuori	6^{5}	6	7
WC	(Italy) F Passaro	6	6^{6}	6
(Colombia) DE Galán	2	7^{8}	2
(United States) B Nakashima	6	4
(Japan) Y Nishioka	4	3^{r}

Second round
7	(Germany) Y Hanfmann	3	2
Alt	(United States) JJ Wolf	6	6
(Argentina) F Coria	6	4	4
4	(Italy) L Sonego	3	6	6
(Finland) E Ruusuvuori	5	6^{4}
WC	(Italy) F Passaro	7	7^{7}
(United States) B Nakashima	4	6	6
2	(Argentina) M Navone	6	3	1

Quarterfinals
Alt	(United States) JJ Wolf	3	3
4	(Italy) L Sonego	6	6
WC	(Italy) F Passaro	7^{7}	6^{7}	6
(United States) B Nakashima	6^{2}	7^{9}	1

Semifinals
4	(Italy) L Sonego	3	2
WC	(Italy) F Passaro	6	6
