= Francesco Passaro =

Italian tennis player (born 2001)

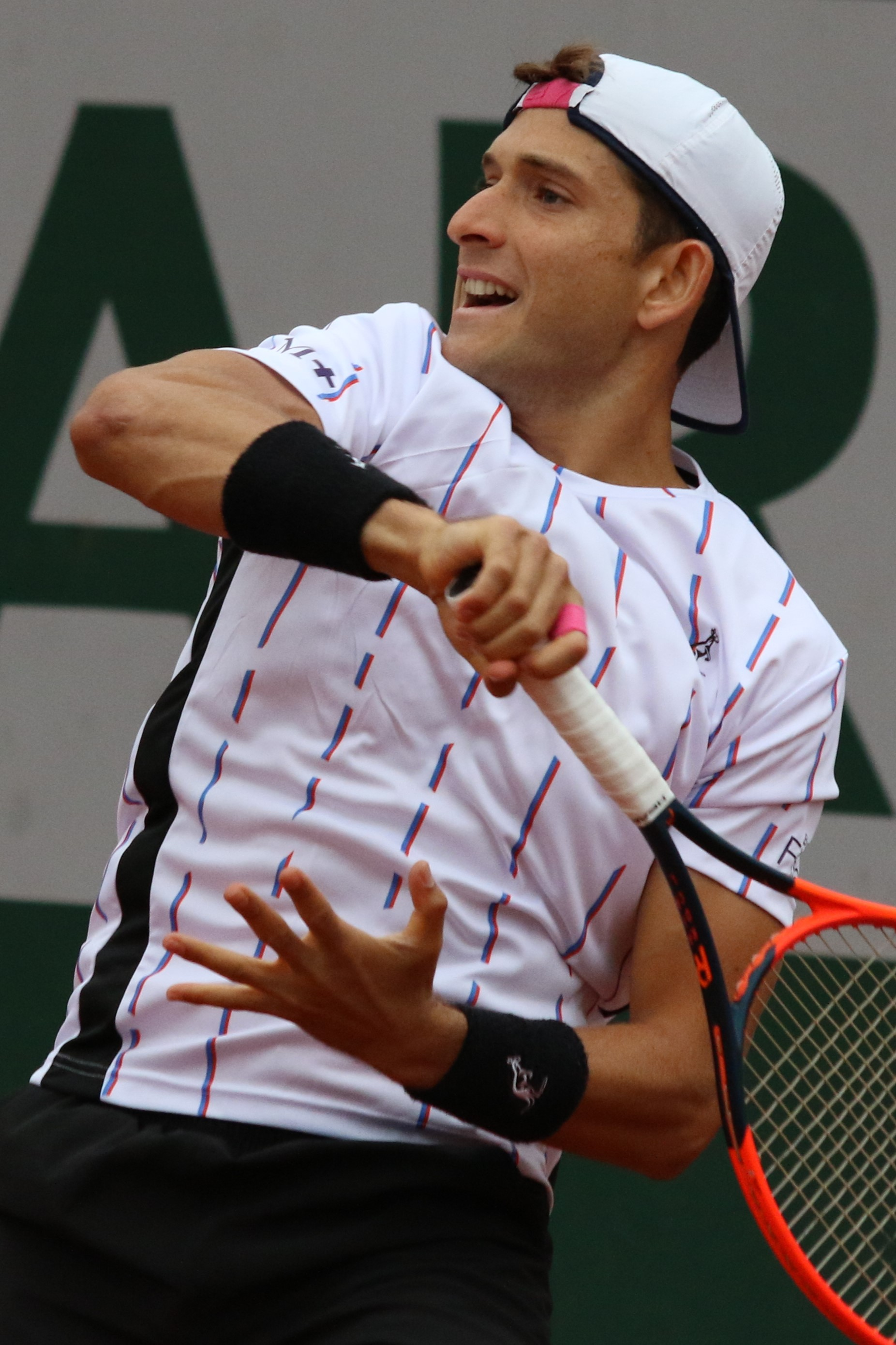
- Passaro at the 2023 French Open
- Country (sports): Italy
- Residence: Perugia, Italy
- Born: 7 January 2001 (age 25) Perugia, Italy
- Height: 1.80 m (5 ft 11 in)
- Turned pro: 2019
- Plays: Right-handed (two-handed backhand)
- Coach: Roberto Tarpani
- Prize money: US $1,460,088

Singles
- Career record: 12–23
- Career titles: 0
- Highest ranking: No. 89 (17 February 2025)
- Current ranking: No. 158 (16 November 2026)

Grand Slam singles results
- Australian Open: 2R (2025)
- French Open: 1R (2025)
- Wimbledon: Q1 (2023, 2024, 2025)
- US Open: 1R (2025, 2026)

Doubles
- Career record: 0–5
- Career titles: 0
- Highest ranking: No. 256 (20 February 2023)
Medal record
Mediterranean Games
Gold medal – first place	2022 Oran	Men's Singles
Gold medal – first place	2022 Oran	Men's Doubles
- Last updated on: 19 November 2026.

Francesco Passaro (born 7 January 2001) is an Italian professional tennis player. He has a career-high ATP singles ranking of world No. 89 achieved on 17 February 2025 and a doubles ranking of No. 256, reached on 20 February 2023. Passaro plays on the ATP Challenger Tour, where he has won five titles in singles.

== Career ==
=== 2021: ATP debut ===
In May, Passaro made his ATP main draw debut at the Emilia-Romagna Open after receiving a wildcard for the doubles main draw.

=== 2022–23: Masters debut, NextGen Finals and top 150 debuts ===
In April 2022, playing as a qualifier, Passaro reached his first ATP Challenger final at the Sanremo Challenger, where he was defeated by top-seed Holger Rune in three sets.

The next month, he made his Masters debut at the Italian Open in Rome as a wildcard.

At the Mediterranean Games in Oran, Algeria, Passaro won the gold medal in men's singles and, with Matteo Arnaldi, the gold medal in men's doubles. He thus shares the record of winning both the singles and doubles titles at the same Mediterranean Games edition with Konstantinos Oikonomidis (2001 Tunis), Nicolás Almagro (2005 Almería), and Blaž Rola (2013 Mersin).

Passaro won his first Challenger title in July 2022 at the Internazionali di Trieste. With this trophy, he became the 20th #NextGenATP winner that season. As a result, he entered top 150, with a singles ranking of world No. 144.

Passaro qualified for the 2022 Next Generation ATP Finals. He reached a career high ranking of No. 108 on 13 February 2023.

=== 2024–25: First Masters third round, Major & top 100 debuts ===
Passaro received a wildcard for the Chile Open in Santiago. He also entered the main draw at the Napoli Cup, this time as an alternate, and reached the semifinals. As a result, he returned to the top 200 in the rankings on 1 April 2024.

After reaching the main draw of his home Masters, the Italian Open, having received a wildcard for the qualifying competition, he defeated Arthur Rinderknech for his first Masters main draw win. Next, he reached the third round for the first time at a Masters level, defeating 23rd seed Tallon Griekspoor.

Following lifting his second title at the 2024 Turin Challenger as a wildcard, with a win over top seed Lorenzo Musetti in the final, Passaro returned to the top 150 in the rankings climbing more than 100 positions back in the rankings on 20 May 2024. He became the first player since Robin Soderling in 2009 (Sunrise) to defeat five Top 100 players en route to a Challenger trophy. A month later, he returned to the top 130 on 17 June 2024. After winning the Genoa Challenger, he returned to the top 110 at a new career-high of No. 106 on 9 September 2024.

Passaro made his Grand Slam main draw debut at the 2025 Australian Open as a lucky loser after the withdrawal of his compatriot Fabio Fognini. He recorded his first Grand Slam win and first top-20 win, following the retirement of tenth seed Grigor Dimitrov due to a hip injury, and moved into the top 100 in the singles rankings at world No. 90 on 27 January 2025. He again defeated Dimitrov, his second top-20 win, at the 2025 Italian Open, to reach back-to-back third rounds at his home Masters.

== Performance timeline ==
Key
W	F	SF	QF	#R	RR	Q#	DNQ	A	NH

(W) winner; (F) finalist; (SF) semifinalist; (QF) quarterfinalist; (#R) rounds 4, 3, 2, 1; (RR) round-robin stage; (Q#) qualification round; (DNQ) did not qualify; (A) absent; (NH) not held; (SR) strike rate (events won / competed); (W–L) win–loss record.
To avoid confusion and double counting, these charts are updated at the conclusion of a tournament or when the player's participation has ended.

=== Singles ===
Current through the 2026 ATP Tour

Tournament	2022	2023	2024	2025	2026	W–L
Grand Slam tournaments
Australian Open	A	Q2	Q2	2R	Q2	1–1
French Open	A	Q1	A	1R	A	0–1
Wimbledon	A	Q1	Q1	Q1	A	0–0
US Open	Q2	Q1	Q2	1R	1R	0–2
Win–loss	0–0	0–0	0–0	1–3	0–1	1–4
ATP Masters 1000
Indian Wells	A	Q2	A	A	A	0–0
Miami Open	A	A	A	A	A	0–0
Monte-Carlo Masters	A	A	A	A	A	0–0
Madrid Open	A	Q1	A	A	A	0–0
Italian Open	1R	1R	3R	3R	A	4–4
Canadian Open	A	A	A	A		0–0
Cincinnati Open	A	A	A	A		0–0
Shanghai Masters	A	A	A	A		0–0
Paris Masters	A	A	A	A		0–0
Win–loss	0–1	0–1	2–1	2–1	0–0	4–4

== ATP Challenger Tour finals ==
=== Singles: 11 (5 titles, 6 runner-ups) ===
Legend ATP Challenger Tour (5–6)	Finals by surface Hard (–) Clay (5–6)

Result	W–L	Date	Tournament	Tier	Surface	Opponent	Score
Loss	0–1	Apr 2022	Sanremo Challenger, Italy	Challenger	Clay	(Denmark) Holger Rune	1–6, 6–2, 4–6
Loss	0–2	Jun 2022	Forlì Open, Italy	Challenger	Clay	(Italy) Lorenzo Musetti	6–2, 3–6, 2–6
Loss	0–3	Jun 2022	Aspria Tennis Cup, Italy	Challenger	Clay	(Argentina) Federico Coria	6–7^{(2–7)}, 4–6
Win	1–3	Jul 2022	Internazionali Città di Trieste, Italy	Challenger	Clay	(China) Zhang Zhizhen	4–6, 6–3, 6–3
Loss	1–4	Sep 2022	Città di Como Challenger, Italy	Challenger	Clay	(Germany) Cedrik-Marcel Stebe	6–7^{(2–7)}, 4–6
Loss	1–5	Jul 2023	Internazionali Città di Trieste, Italy	Challenger	Clay	(France) Hugo Gaston	3–6, 7–5, 2–6
Win	2–5	May 2024	Piemonte Open, Italy	Challenger	Clay	(Italy) Lorenzo Musetti	6–3, 7–5
Win	3–5	Sep 2024	AON Open, Italy	Challenger	Clay	(Spain) Jaume Munar	7–5, 6–3
Loss	3–6	Nov 2024	Maia Open, Portugal	Challenger	Clay (i)	(Bosnia and Herzegovina) Damir Džumhur	3–6, 4–6
Win	4–6	Oct 2026	Internazionali di Sicilia, Italy	Challenger	Clay	(Czech Republic) Jonáš Forejtek	6–3, 6–7^{(2–7)}, 7–6^{(7–4)}
Win	5–6	Oct 2026	Maia Open, Portugal	Challenger	Clay (i)	(Hungary) Zsombor Piros	4–6, 6–3, 6–2

=== Doubles: 3 (3 runner-ups) ===
Legend ATP Challenger Tour (0–3)	Finals by surface Hard (0–1) Clay (0–2)

Result	W–L	Date	Tournament	Tier	Surface	Partner	Opponents	Score
Loss	0–1	May 2022	Internazionali Città di Vicenza, Italy	Challenger	Clay	(Italy) Matteo Gigante	(Argentina) Francisco Comesaña (Italy) Luciano Darderi	3–6, 6–7^{(4–7)}
Loss	0–2	Feb 2023	Tenerife Challenger II, Spain	Challenger	Hard	(Italy) Matteo Gigante	(United States) Christian Harrison (Japan) Shintaro Mochizuki	4–6, 3–6
Loss	0–3	Sep 2023	Layjet Open, Austria	Challenger	Clay	(Italy) Marco Bortolotti	(Germany) Hendrik Jebens (Germany) Constantin Frantzen	1–6, 2–6

== ITF World Tennis Tour finals ==
=== Singles: 5 (3 titles, 2 runner-ups) ===
Legend ITF WTT (3–2)	Finals by surface Hard (1–1) Clay (2–1)

Result	W–L	Date	Tournament	Tier	Surface	Opponent	Score
Loss	0–1	Jul 2019	M15 Gubbio, Italy	WTT	Clay	(Argentina) Gonzalo Villanueva	5–7, 2–6
Win	1–1	Apr 2021	M15 Cairo, Egypt	WTT	Clay	(Italy) Giacomo Dambrosi	6–1, 6–4
Win	2–1	Aug 2021	M15 Xàtiva, Spain	WTT	Clay	(Spain) Iñaki Montes de la Torre	2–6, 6–1, 6–4
Loss	2–2	Jan 2022	M15 Monastir, Tunisia	WTT	Hard	(Italy) Mattia Bellucci	4–6, 5–7
Win	3–2	Feb 2022	M15 Monastir, Tunisia	WTT	Hard	(France) Térence Atmane	7–6^{(7–3)}, 6–2

=== Doubles: 4 (3 titles, 1 runner-up) ===
Legend ITF WTT (3–1)	Finals by surface Hard (–) Clay (3–1)

Result	W–L	Date	Tournament	Tier	Surface	Partner	Opponents	Score
Loss	0–1	Mar 2019	M15 Murcia, Spain	WTT	Clay	(Italy) Lorenzo Bocchi	(Spain) Eduard Esteve Lobato (Spain) Álvaro López San Martín	4–6, 4–6
Win	1–1	Apr 2021	M15 Cairo, Egypt	WTT	Clay	(Italy) Daniele Capecchi	(United Kingdom) Luke Johnson (Ukraine) Volodymyr Uzhylovskyi	7–5, 6–4
Win	2–1	Aug 2021	M15 Xàtiva, Spain	WTT	Clay	(Spain) Imanol López Morillo	(Spain) Alberto Barroso Campos (Spain) Benjamín Winter López	6–4, 6–4
Win	3–1	Oct 2021	M15 Madrid, Spain	WTT	Clay	(Spain) Carlos López Montagud	(France) Lucas Bouquet (North Macedonia) Stefan Micov	6–0, 6–3

== Wins against top 10 players ==
- Passaro has a 1–0 record against players who were, at the time the match was played, ranked in the top 10.

Season	2025	Total
Wins	1	1

#	Player	Rk	Event	Surface	Rd	Score	Rk	Ref
2025
1.	(Bulgaria) Grigor Dimitrov	10	Australian Open, Australia	Hard	1R	7–5, 2–1 ret.	104	

- Key: (Rk) first use, opponent rank; (Rd) round; (Rk) 2nd use, player rank; (Ref) reference; (F) final; (SF) semifinal; (QF) quarterfinal; (#R) rounds 4, 3, 2, 1; (RR) round-robin stage; (Q#) qualifying rounds or stages (3), 2, 1.
