= 2009 Open Tarragona Costa Daurada =

- Date: 5–11 October
- Edition: 4th
- Location: Tarragona, Spain

Champions

Singles
- (Spain) Daniel Gimeno Traver

Doubles
- (Poland) Tomasz Bednarek / (Poland) Mateusz Kowalczyk
← 2008 ·	Open Tarragona Costa Daurada	· 2010 →

The 2009 Open Tarragona Costa Daurada was a professional tennis tournament played on outdoor red clay courts. It was the fourth edition of the tournament which was part of the 2009 ATP Challenger Tour. It took place in Tarragona, Spain between 5 and 11 October 2009.

== Singles main draw entrants ==
=== Seeds ===
Country	Player	Rank^{1}	Seed
AUS	Peter Luczak	69	1
ESP	Óscar Hernández	72	2
ESP	Marcel Granollers	79	3
ESP	Alberto Martín	98	4
ITA	Paolo Lorenzi	106	5
ESP	Daniel Gimeno Traver	112	6
CZE	Jan Hájek	114	7
ALG	Lamine Ouahab	124	8

- Rankings are as of September 28, 2009.

=== Other entrants ===
The following players received wildcards into the singles main draw:

- (Spain) Arnau Brugués-Davi
- (Spain) Iñigo Cervantes-Huegun
- (Spain) Sergio Gutiérrez-Ferrol
- (Spain) David Valeriano

The following players received entry from the qualifying draw:

- (Italy) Alberto Brizzi
- (Spain) Marc Fornell-Mestres
- (Austria) Philipp Oswald (as a Lucky loser)
- (Spain) Albert Ramos-Viñolas
- (France) Guillaume Rufin

== Champions ==
=== Singles ===
(Spain) Daniel Gimeno Traver def. (Italy) Paolo Lorenzi, 6–4, 6–0

=== Doubles ===
(Poland) Tomasz Bednarek / (Poland) Mateusz Kowalczyk def. (Italy) Flavio Cipolla / (Italy) Alessandro Motti, 6–1, 6–1
