= 2010 Open Tarragona Costa Daurada – Singles =

Singles
- 2010 Open Tarragona Costa Daurada

Final
- Champion: (Spain) Marcel Granollers
- Runner-up: (Czech Republic) Jaroslav Pospíšil
- Score: 1–6, 7–5, 6–0

Events
Singles	Doubles
- Open Tarragona Costa Daurada

Daniel Gimeno-Traver won last year's edition, but decided not to participate this year.
Top seed Marcel Granollers won in the final match and became the new champion. He defeated Jaroslav Pospíšil 1–6, 7–5, 6–0.

== Seeds ==
1. (Spain) Marcel Granollers (champion)
2. (Spain) Pablo Andújar (first round, retired due to shoulder injury)
3. (Spain) Pere Riba (semifinals)
4. (Portugal) Frederico Gil (semifinals)
5. (Czech Republic) Jan Hájek (second round, withdrew due to back injury)
6. (Spain) Albert Ramos-Viñolas (quarterfinals)
7. (Spain) Daniel Muñoz-de la Nava (second round)
8. (France) Benoît Paire (quarterfinals)

== Draw ==
Key

- Q = Qualifier
- WC = Wild card
- LL = Lucky loser
- Alt = Alternate
- ITF = ITF entry
- PR = Protected ranking
- SR = Special ranking
- SE = Special exempt
- JE = Junior exempt
- JR = Junior Accelerator Programme entrant
- CO = College Accelerator Programme entrant
- NG = Next Gen Accelerator Program entrant
- w/o = Walkover
- r = Retired
- d = Defaulted

=== Finals ===
Semifinals
1/WC	(Spain) Marcel Granollers	3	6	6
3	(Spain) Pere Riba	6	3	4
4/WC	(Portugal) Frederico Gil	2	6	6^{5}
(Czech Republic) Jaroslav Pospíšil	6	4	7

Final
1/WC	(Spain) Marcel Granollers	1	7	6
(Czech Republic) Jaroslav Pospíšil	6	5	0

=== Top half ===
First round
1/WC	(Spain) M Granollers	6	6
Q	(Netherlands) B Westerhof	1	3
(France) O Patience	6	5	6^{4}
(Sweden) F Prpic	4	7	7
LL	(Spain) J Checa-Calvo	1	6	6
(Italy) M Trevisan	6	2	1
(Germany) M Bachinger	4	4
7	(Spain) D Muñoz-de la Nava	6	6
3	(Spain) P Riba	6	6
Q	(Spain) M Palacios	3	1
WC	(Spain) S Gutiérrez-Ferrol	7	4	6
(France) G Rufin	6^{3}	6	1
(Spain) P Santos	3	1
(Spain) P Clar-Rosselló	6	6
LL	(Spain) J Samper-Montaña	3	2
8	(France) B Paire	6	6

Second round
1/WC	(Spain) M Granollers	6	6
(Sweden) F Prpic	2	4
LL	(Spain) J Checa-Calvo	6	2	6
7	(Spain) D Muñoz-de la Nava	3	6	3
3	(Spain) P Riba	6	6
WC	(Spain) S Gutiérrez-Ferrol	1	2
(Spain) P Clar-Rosselló	6	5	4
8	(France) B Paire	1	7	6

Quarterfinals
1/WC	(Spain) M Granollers	6	6
LL	(Spain) J Checa-Calvo	1	1
3	(Spain) P Riba	6	7
8	(France) B Paire	3	6^{4}

Semifinals
1/WC	(Spain) M Granollers	3	6	6
3	(Spain) P Riba	6	3	4

=== Bottom half ===
First round
6	(Spain) A Ramos-Viñolas	6	6
(France) L Rochette	3	1
Q	(Spain) G Granollers-Pujol	2	0
(Germany) A Flock	6	6
(Italy) D Giorgini	1	2
(Italy) A Arnaboldi	6	6
(Spain) G Trujillo-Soler	3	4
4/WC	(Portugal) F Gil	6	6
5	(Czech Republic) J Hájek	6	6
(Netherlands) M Middelkoop	3	3
WC	(Zimbabwe) T Chanakira	1	1
(Spain) G Olaso	6	6
(France) A Sidorenko	1	6	6
Q	(France) A Michon	6	1	4
(Czech Republic) J Pospíšil	6	5
2	(Spain) P Andújar	4	0	r

Second round
6	(Spain) A Ramos-Viñolas	7	6
(Germany) A Flock	5	2
(Italy) A Arnaboldi	3	7	4
4/WC	(Portugal) F Gil	6	6^{5}	6
5	(Czech Republic) J Hájek	w/o
(Spain) G Olaso
(France) A Sidorenko	6	1	6^{7}
(Czech Republic) J Pospíšil	1	6	7

Quarterfinals
6	(Spain) A Ramos-Viñolas	4	6	4
4/WC	(Portugal) F Gil	6	4	6
(Spain) G Olaso	7	1	1
(Czech Republic) J Pospíšil	6^{3}	6	6

Semifinals
4/WC	(Portugal) F Gil	2	6	6^{5}
(Czech Republic) J Pospíšil	6	4	7
