= 2009 Open Tarragona Costa Daurada – Singles =

Singles
- 2009 Open Tarragona Costa Daurada

Final
- Champion: (Spain) Daniel Gimeno-Traver
- Runner-up: (Italy) Paolo Lorenzi
- Score: 6–4, 6–0

Events
Singles	Doubles
- Open Tarragona Costa Daurada

Alberto Martín was the defending champion, but he lost to Antonio Veić in the second round.
Daniel Gimeno-Traver won in the final 6–4, 6–0, against Paolo Lorenzi.

== Seeds ==
1. (Australia) Peter Luczak (quarterfinals)
2. (Spain) Óscar Hernández (second round)
3. (Spain) Marcel Granollers (second round)
4. (Spain) Alberto Martín (second round)
5. (Italy) Paolo Lorenzi (final)
6. (Spain) Daniel Gimeno-Traver (champion)
7. (Czech Republic) Jan Hájek (semifinals)
8. (Algeria) Lamine Ouahab (second round)

== Draw ==
Key

- Q = Qualifier
- WC = Wild card
- LL = Lucky loser
- Alt = Alternate
- ITF = ITF entry
- PR = Protected ranking
- SR = Special ranking
- SE = Special exempt
- JE = Junior exempt
- JR = Junior Accelerator Programme entrant
- CO = College Accelerator Programme entrant
- NG = Next Gen Accelerator Program entrant
- w/o = Walkover
- r = Retired
- d = Defaulted

=== Final four ===
Semifinals
7	(Czech Republic) Jan Hájek	2	6	0
6	(Spain) Daniel Gimeno-Traver	6	0	6
Q	(Spain) Albert Ramos-Viñolas	4	4
5	(Italy) Paolo Lorenzi	6	6

Final
6	(Spain) Daniel Gimeno-Traver	6	6
5	(Italy) Paolo Lorenzi	4	0

=== Top half ===
First round
1	(Australia) P Luczak	6	4	7
(Austria) M Fischer	3	6	6^{5}
WC	(Spain) David Valeriano	3	1
(France) V Millot	6	6
WC	(Spain) I Cervantes-Huegun	4	1
Q	(France) G Rufin	6	6
(Italy) T Tenconi	4	3
7	(Czech Republic) J Hájek	6	6
3	(Spain) M Granollers	6	6
(Italy) A di Mauro	2	4
Q	(Italy) A Brizzi	7	4
(Austria) A Haider-Maurer	6^{8}	0	r
(Monaco) J-R Lisnard	1	0
(Italy) F Cipolla	6	6
(Kazakhstan) Y Schukin	3	2
6	(Spain) D Gimeno-Traver	6	6

Second round
1	(Australia) P Luczak	7	6
(France) V Millot	6^{4}	1
Q	(France) G Rufin	2	3
7	(Czech Republic) J Hájek	6	6
3	(Spain) M Granollers	4	6	3
Q	(Italy) A Brizzi	6	4	6
(Italy) F Cipolla	1	6^{1}
6	(Spain) D Gimeno-Traver	6	7

Quarterfinals
1	(Australia) P Luczak	2	2
7	(Czech Republic) J Hájek	6	6
Q	(Italy) A Brizzi	2	2
6	(Spain) D Gimeno-Traver	6	6

Semifinals
7	(Czech Republic) J Hájek	2	6	0
6	(Spain) D Gimeno-Traver	6	0	6

=== Bottom half ===
First round
8	(Algeria) L Ouahab	6	2	6
(Jamaica) D Brown	3	6	4
Q	(Spain) M Fornell-Mestres	7	4	4
Q	(Spain) A Ramos-Viñolas	6^{2}	6	6
LL	(Austria) P Oswald	2	4
(Croatia) A Veić	6	6
WC	(Spain) Sergio Gutiérrez-Ferrol	4	2
4	(Spain) A Martín	6	6
5	(Italy) P Lorenzi	6	7
(Spain) P Andújar	3	5
(Australia) J Sirianni	4	1
(Spain) I Navarro	6	6
(Spain) P Riba	7	6^{2}	6
(Italy) M Crugnola	5	7	2
WC	(Spain) Arnau Brugués-Davi	1	1
2	(Spain) Ó Hernández	6	6

Second round
8	(Algeria) L Ouahab	6^{1}	7	4
Q	(Spain) A Ramos-Viñolas	7	5	6
(Croatia) A Veić	5	6	6
4	(Spain) A Martín	7	4	1
5	(Italy) P Lorenzi	6	6
(Spain) I Navarro	3	0
(Spain) P Riba	4	6	6
2	(Spain) Ó Hernández	6	2	3

Quarterfinals
Q	(Spain) A Ramos-Viñolas	7	6
(Croatia) A Veić	6^{2}	3
5	(Italy) P Lorenzi	7	6^{5}	6
(Spain) P Riba	5	7	2

Semifinals
Q	(Spain) A Ramos-Viñolas	4	4
5	(Italy) P Lorenzi	6	6
