= 2010 Open Tarragona Costa Daurada – Doubles =

Doubles
- 2010 Open Tarragona Costa Daurada

Final
- Champions: (Spain) Guillermo Olaso (Spain) Pere Riba
- Runners-up: (Spain) Pablo Andújar (Spain) Gerard Granollers Pujol
- Score: 7–6(1), 4–6, [10–5]

Events
Singles	Doubles
← 2009 ·	Open Tarragona Costa Daurada

Tomasz Bednarek and Mateusz Kowalczyk were the defending champions, but chose to not compete this year.
Guillermo Olaso and Pere Riba won the final against Pablo Andújar and Gerard Granollers Pujol 7–6(1), 4–6, [10–5].

== Seeds ==
1. (Spain) Guillermo Olaso / (Spain) Pere Riba (champions)
2. (Spain) Daniel Muñoz de la Nava / (Spain) Gabriel Trujillo Soler (first round)
3. (Spain) Pablo Andújar / (Spain) Gerard Granollers Pujol (final)
4. (France) Alexandre Sidorenko / (Netherlands) Boy Westerhof (semifinals)

== Draw ==
=== Key ===
- Q = Qualifier
- WC = Wild card
- LL = Lucky loser
- Alt = Alternate
- SE = Special exempt
- PR = Protected ranking
- ITF = ITF entry
- JE = Junior exempt
- w/o = Walkover
- r = Retired
- d = Defaulted
- SR = Special ranking

=== Draw ===
First round
1	(Spain) G Olaso (Spain) P Riba	6	6
WC	(Spain) P Gor (Spain) D Jordá	3	3
WC	(Chile) A Araya (Spain) J Muñoz Abreu	6^{3}	4
(Russia) N Nesterov (Spain) S Pérez Pérez	7	6
4	(France) A Sidorenko (Netherlands) B Westerhof	6	6
WC	(Spain) K García (Spain) Á Valeriano	0	0
(Netherlands) M Middelkoop (Netherlands Antilles) M van Haasteren	6	6
(Spain) D de Miguel (Spain) C Gómez-Ferre	2	3
(France) B Paire (France) O Patience	1	2
(Spain) J Checa Calvo (Spain) J Samper Montaña	6	6
(Spain) P Clar-Rosselló (Spain) P Santos	2	2
3	(Spain) P Andújar (Spain) G Granollers Pujol	6	6
(Spain) J Marse-Vidri (India) N Shaikh	0	2
(Spain) Á López Morón (Spain) M Mas	6	6
(Czech Republic) J Hájek (Czech Republic) J Pospíšil	7	6
2	(Spain) D Muñoz de la Nava (Spain) G Trujillo Soler	6^{3}	1

Quarterfinals
1	(Spain) G Olaso (Spain) P Riba	6	6
(Russia) N Nesterov (Spain) S Pérez-Pérez	0	3
4	(France) A Sidorenko (Netherlands) B Westerhof	6	6
(Netherlands) M Middelkoop (Netherlands Antilles) M van Haasteren	3	4
(Spain) J Checa Calvo (Spain) J Samper Montaña	0	2
3	(Spain) P Andújar (Spain) G Granollers Pujol	6	6
(Spain) Á López Morón (Spain) M Mas
(Czech Republic) J Hájek (Czech Republic) J Pospíšil	w/o

Semifinals
1	(Spain) G Olaso (Spain) P Riba	6	6
4	(France) A Sidorenko (Netherlands) B Westerhof	2	2
3	(Spain) P Andújar (Spain) G Granollers Pujol	6	6
(Spain) Á López Morón (Spain) M Mas	2	2

Finals
1	(Spain) G Olaso (Spain) P Riba	7	4	[10]
3	(Spain) P Andújar (Spain) G Granollers Pujol	6^{1}	6	[5]
