= 2009 Open Tarragona Costa Daurada – Doubles =

Doubles
- 2009 Open Tarragona Costa Daurada

Final
- Champions: (Poland) Tomasz Bednarek (Poland) Mateusz Kowalczyk
- Runners-up: (Italy) Flavio Cipolla (Italy) Alessandro Motti
- Score: 6–1, 6–1

Events
Singles	Doubles
← 2008 ·	Open Tarragona Costa Daurada	· 2010 →

Dušan Karol and Daniel Köllerer were the defending champions, but only Karol tried to defend his title.
He partnered with Jan Hájek, but they lost to Tomasz Bednarek and Mateusz Kowalczyk in the semifinals.
Polish pair won this tournament. They defeated Flavio Cipolla and Alessandro Motti 6–1, 6–1 in the final.

== Seeds ==
1. (Spain) Marcel Granollers / (Spain) Marc López (first round)
2. (Italy) Flavio Cipolla / (Italy) Alessandro Motti (final)
3. (Australia) Joseph Sirianni / (Brazil) Márcio Torres (first round)
4. (Russia) Dmitri Sitak / (United States) Kaes Van't Hof (first round)

== Draw ==
Key

- Q = Qualifier
- WC = Wild card
- LL = Lucky loser
- Alt = Alternate
- ITF = ITF entry
- PR = Protected ranking
- SR = Special ranking
- SE = Special exempt
- JE = Junior exempt
- JR = Junior Accelerator Programme entrant
- CO = College Accelerator Programme entrant
- NG = Next Gen Accelerator Program entrant
- w/o = Walkover
- r = Retired
- d = Defaulted

=== Draw ===
First round
1	(Spain) M Granollers (Spain) M López	1	4
(Poland) T Bednarek (Poland) M Kowalczyk	6	6
(Algeria) L Ouahab (Spain) G Trujillo-Soler	6	6
(Italy) M Crugnola (Italy) A di Mauro	3	4
4	(Russia) D Sitak (United States) K Van't Hof	6^{4}	7	[1]
(Czech Republic) J Hájek (Czech Republic) D Karol	7	6^{5}	[10]
(Spain) P Andújar (Spain) A Ramos-Viñolas	6	6^{5}	[4]
(Austria) A Haider-Maurer (Netherlands) B Westerhof	4	7	[10]
WC	(Spain) Marc Dolcet (Spain) Pablo Gor	1	2
(Austria) M Fischer (Austria) P Oswald	6	6
(Jamaica) D Brown (Canada) A Shamasdin	6	3	[10]
3	(Australia) J Sirianni (Brazil) M Torres	2	6	[7]
WC	(Spain) Á López Morón (Spain) A Portas	7	6
(United States) B Battistone (United States) D Battistone	6^{2}	3
WC	(Finland) H Laaksonen (Spain) Jordi Muñoz-Abreu	2	2
2	(Italy) F Cipolla (Italy) A Motti	6	6

Quarterfinals
(Poland) T Bednarek (Poland) M Kowalczyk	7	5	[10]
(Algeria) L Ouahab (Spain) G Trujillo-Soler	5	7	[4]
(Czech Republic) J Hájek (Czech Republic) D Karol
(Austria) A Haider-Maurer (Netherlands) B Westerhof	w/o
(Austria) M Fischer (Austria) P Oswald	6	6
(Jamaica) D Brown (Canada) A Shamasdin	3	4
WC	(Spain) Á López Morón (Spain) A Portas	1	7	[7]
2	(Italy) F Cipolla (Italy) A Motti	6	6^{9}	[10]

Semifinals
(Poland) T Bednarek (Poland) M Kowalczyk	6	6
(Czech Republic) J Hájek (Czech Republic) D Karol	3	3
(Austria) M Fischer (Austria) P Oswald	4	6	[7]
2	(Italy) F Cipolla (Italy) A Motti	6	4	[10]

Finals
(Poland) T Bednarek (Poland) M Kowalczyk	6	6
2	(Italy) F Cipolla (Italy) A Motti	1	1
