= 2010 BNP Paribas Primrose Bordeaux – Singles =

Singles
- 2010 BNP Paribas Primrose Bordeaux

Final
- Champion: (France) Richard Gasquet
- Runner-up: (France) Michaël Llodra
- Score: 4–6, 6–1, 6–4

Events
Singles	Doubles
← 2009 ·	BNP Paribas Primrose Bordeaux	· 2011 →

Marc Gicquel was the defending champion, but he chose not to compete this year.
Richard Gasquet win in the final 4–6, 6–1, 6–4, against Michaël Llodra.

== Seeds ==
1. (France) Michaël Llodra (finals)
2. (Belgium) Olivier Rochus (quarterfinals)
3. (France) Florent Serra (semifinals)
4. (Uzbekistan) Denis Istomin (semifinals)
5. (France) Arnaud Clément (second round)
6. (Belgium) Xavier Malisse (quarterfinals)
7. (France) Richard Gasquet (champion)
8. (Slovakia) Karol Beck (first round)

== Draw ==
=== Key ===
- Q = Qualifier
- WC = Wild card
- LL = Lucky loser
- Alt = Alternate
- SE = Special exempt
- PR = Protected ranking
- ITF = ITF entry
- JE = Junior exempt
- w/o = Walkover
- r = Retired
- d = Defaulted
- SR = Special ranking

=== Finals ===
Semifinals
1	(France) Michaël Llodra	7	6
4	(Uzbekistan) Denis Istomin	6^{3}	3
3	(France) Florent Serra	2	3
7	(France) Richard Gasquet	6	6

Final
1	(France) Michaël Llodra	6	1	4
7	(France) Richard Gasquet	4	6	6

=== Top half ===
First round
1	(France) M Llodra	6	6
(Austria) S Koubek	4	4
(Brazil) T Alves	0	6	6
(Belgium) S Darcis	6	4	3
Q	(Spain) J Checa-Calvo	2	2
Q	(France) B Paire	6	6
(Paraguay) R Delgado	6	7
8	(Slovakia) K Beck	3	5
4	(Uzbekistan) D Istomin	6	6
(Brazil) J Silva	2	1
(Belgium) K Vliegen	7	2	3
WC	(France) D Guez	6^{9}	6	6
(Argentina) J Acasuso	6^{4}	5
(France) É Roger-Vasselin	7	7
(Poland) M Przysiężny	6	3	5
5	(France) A Clément	4	6	7

Second round
1	(France) M Llodra	6	6
(Brazil) T Alves	4	2
Q	(France) B Paire	6	6
(Paraguay) R Delgado	2	1
4	(Uzbekistan) D Istomin	6	3	6
WC	(France) D Guez	4	6	3
(France) É Roger-Vasselin	6	6^{6}	6
5	(France) A Clément	2	7	3

Quarterfinals
1	(France) M Llodra	6	7
Q	(France) B Paire	3	5
4	(Uzbekistan) D Istomin	6	7
(France) É Roger-Vasselin	3	6^{6}

Semifinals
1	(France) M Llodra	7	6
4	(Uzbekistan) D Istomin	6^{3}	3

=== Bottom half ===
First round
6	(Belgium) X Malisse	6	7
(France) J Ouanna	2	6^{8}
(Germany) M Zverev	2	0	r
(Czech Republic) J Hernych	6	2
WC	(France) N Mahut	6	7
(Russia) I Kunitsyn	2	5
Q	(France) O Patience	2	2
3	(France) F Serra	6	6
7	(France) R Gasquet	6	6
WC	(France) T Ascione	3	1
(United Kingdom) A Bogdanovic	6	6
(United States) R Ginepri	1	4
WC	(France) L Rochette	6^{3}	1
SE	(Spain) A Ramos-Viñolas	7	6
Q	(Brazil) C Zampieri	6^{3}	4
2	(Belgium) O Rochus	7	6

Second round
6	(Belgium) X Malisse	6	4	7
(Czech Republic) J Hernych	2	6	6^{2}
WC	(France) N Mahut	1	3
3	(France) F Serra	6	6
7	(France) R Gasquet	6	6
(United Kingdom) A Bogdanovic	3	2
SE	(Spain) A Ramos-Viñolas	4	7	4
2	(Belgium) O Rochus	6	6^{6}	6

Quarterfinals
6	(Belgium) X Malisse	3	4
3	(France) F Serra	6	6
7	(France) R Gasquet	6	6
2	(Belgium) O Rochus	1	2

Semifinals
3	(France) F Serra	2	3
7	(France) R Gasquet	6	6
