= 2009 Yugra Cup – Singles =

Singles
- 2009 Yugra Cup

Final
- Champion: (Russia) Konstantin Kravchuk
- Runner-up: (Spain) Marcel Granollers
- Score: 1–6, 6–3, 6–2

Events
Singles	Doubles
← 2008 ·	Yugra Cup	· 2010 →

Konstantin Kravchuk defeated Marcel Granollers 1–6, 6–3, 6–2 in the final.

== Seeds ==
1. (Spain) Marcel Granollers (final)
2. (Russia) Alexandre Kudryavtsev (quarterfinals)
3. (Israel) Noam Okun (second round)
4. (Russia) Evgeny Kirillov (second round)
5. (Republic of Ireland) Conor Niland (second round)
6. (Slovakia) Ivo Klec (quarterfinals)
7. (Romania) Petru-Alexandru Luncanu (second round)
8. (Russia) Andrey Kumantsov (quarterfinals)

== Draw ==
=== Key ===
- Q = Qualifier
- WC = Wild card
- LL = Lucky loser
- Alt = Alternate
- SE = Special exempt
- PR = Protected ranking
- ITF = ITF entry
- JE = Junior exempt
- w/o = Walkover
- r = Retired
- d = Defaulted
- SR = Special ranking

=== Finals ===
Semifinals
1/WC	(Spain) Marcel Granollers	6	7
(Czech Republic) Jan Mertl	3	6^{7}
(Russia) Andrey Kuznetsov	6	3	4
(Russia) Konstantin Kravchuk	3	6	6

Final
1/WC	(Spain) Marcel Granollers	6	3	2
(Russia) Konstantin Kravchuk	1	6	6

=== Top half ===
First round
1/WC	(Spain) M Granollers	6	6
(France) F Martin	4	4
WC	(Russia) R Bekoev	7	2	2
(Germany) F Moser	6^{4}	6	6
(Czech Republic) D Lustig	6	6
(United States) JP Fruttero	4	1
Q	(Russia) A Sitak	6^{3}	2
7	(Romania) P-A Luncanu	7	6
3	(Israel) N Okun	6^{2}	6	6
Q	(Russia) M Fufygin	7	4	1
(Russia) N Nesterov	2	3
(Czech Republic) J Mertl	6	6
(Russia) P Chekhov	7	6
(Serbia) D Lajović	6^{5}	3
WC	(Russia) A Manegin	3	1
6/Q	(Slovakia) I Klec	6	6

Second round
1/WC	(Spain) M Granollers	6	4	6
(Germany) F Moser	4	6	1
(Czech Republic) D Lustig	6	6
7	(Romania) P-A Luncanu	2	4
3	(Israel) N Okun	7	6^{3}	5
(Czech Republic) J Mertl	6^{6}	7	7
(Russia) P Chekhov	2	4
6/Q	(Slovakia) I Klec	6	6

Quarterfinals
1/WC	(Spain) M Granollers	6	6
(Czech Republic) D Lustig	1	3
(Czech Republic) J Mertl	6	7
6/Q	(Slovakia) I Klec	4	5

Semifinals
1/WC	(Spain) M Granollers	6	7
(Czech Republic) J Mertl	3	6^{7}

=== Bottom half ===
First round
8/Q	(Russia) A Kumantsov	6	7
WC	(Russia) Y Vaschenko	2	6^{3}
(Russia) A Plotniy	6^{10}	3
(Russia) E Donskoy	7	6
(Russia) I Belyaev	3	4
4	(Russia) E Kirillov	6	6
(Russia) A Kuznetsov	6^{4}	6	6
(Russia) S Krotiouk	7	3	4
5	(Republic of Ireland) C Niland	6	6
(Serbia) D Savić	1	3
(Russia) D Matsukevich	4	4
(Russia) K Kravchuk	6	6
(Russia) D Sitak	6	3	3
(Russia) V Rudnev	4	6	6
(Germany) S Rieschick	3	3
2	(Russia) A Kudryavtsev	6	6

Second round
8/Q	(Russia) A Kumantsov	6^{3}	6	7
(Russia) E Donskoy	7	2	6
4	(Russia) E Kirillov	6	3	5
(Russia) A Kuznetsov	3	6	7
5	(Republic of Ireland) C Niland	6^{5}	2
(Russia) K Kravchuk	7	6
(Russia) V Rudnev	3	1
2	(Russia) A Kudryavtsev	6	6

Quarterfinals
8/Q	(Russia) A Kumantsov	2	2
(Russia) A Kuznetsov	6	6
(Russia) K Kravchuk	7	6
2	(Russia) A Kudryavtsev	6^{5}	4

Semifinals
(Russia) A Kuznetsov	6	3	4
(Russia) K Kravchuk	3	6	6
