= 2009 Yugra Cup – Doubles =

Doubles
- 2009 Yugra Cup

Final
- Champions: (Spain) Marcel Granollers (Spain) Gerard Granollers-Pujol
- Runners-up: (Russia) Evgeny Kirillov (Russia) Andrey Kuznetsov
- Score: 6–3, 6–2

Events
Singles	Doubles
← 2008 ·	Yugra Cup	· 2010 →

Spanish brothers Marcel and Gerard Granollers-Pujol won this tournament, by defeating Evgeny Kirillov and Andrey Kuznetsov 6–3, 6–2 in the final.

== Seeds ==
1. (Spain) Marcel Granollers / (Spain) Gerard Granollers-Pujol (champions)
2. (Russia) Alexandre Kudryavtsev / (Russia) Denis Matsukevich (quarterfinals)
3. (Germany) Frank Moser / (Germany) Sebastian Rieschick (quarterfinals)
4. (Russia) Artem Sitak / (Russia) Dmitri Sitak (semifinals)

== Draw ==
=== Key ===
- Q = Qualifier
- WC = Wild card
- LL = Lucky loser
- Alt = Alternate
- SE = Special exempt
- PR = Protected ranking
- ITF = ITF entry
- JE = Junior exempt
- w/o = Walkover
- r = Retired
- d = Defaulted
- SR = Special ranking

=== Finals ===
Semifinals
1	(Spain) M Granollers (Spain) G Granollers-Pujol	6	6
4	(Russia) A Sitak (Russia) D Sitak	3	3
(Russia) E Kirillov (Russia) A Kuznetsov	7	6^{5}	[10]
Q	(Czech Republic) D Lustig (Czech Republic) J Mertl	6^{4}	7	[8]

Final
1	(Spain) M Granollers (Spain) G Granollers-Pujol	6	6
(Russia) E Kirillov (Russia) A Kuznetsov	3	2
