= 2008 U.S. Men's Clay Court Championships =

- Date: April 14–20
- Edition: 40th
- Category: International Series
- Draw: 32S / 16D
- Prize money: $411,000
- Surface: Clay / outdoor
- Location: Houston, Texas, United States
- Venue: River Oaks Country Club

Champions

Singles
- (Spain) Marcel Granollers Pujol

Doubles
- (Latvia) Ernests Gulbis / (Germany) Rainer Schüttler
← 2007 ·	U.S. Men's Clay Court Championships	· 2009 →

The 2008 U.S. Men's Clay Court Championships was a men's tennis tournament played on outdoor clay courts. It was the 40th edition of the U.S. Men's Clay Court Championships, and was part of the International Series of the 2008 ATP Tour. It took place at River Oaks Country Club in Houston, Texas, United States, from April 14 through April 20, 2008. Seventh-seeded Marcel Granollers Pujol won the singles title.

The singles draw featured ATP No. 8, 2007 Davis Cup champion and Delray Beach finalist James Blake, Indian Wells quarterfinalist Tommy Haas, and Miami Masters runner-up Mardy Fish. Among other top players competing were Las Vegas winner Sam Querrey, Acapulco quarterfinalist Agustín Calleri, Dudi Sela, Marcel Granollers Pujol and Óscar Hernández.

== Finals ==
=== Singles ===
(Spain) Marcel Granollers Pujol defeated (United States) James Blake, 6–4, 1–6, 7–5

- It was Marcel Granollers Pujol's 1st career title.

=== Doubles ===
(Latvia) Ernests Gulbis / (Germany) Rainer Schüttler defeated (Uruguay) Pablo Cuevas / (Spain) Marcel Granollers Pujol, 7–5, 7–6^{(7–3)}
