= 2010 BNP Paribas Primrose Bordeaux =

- Date: May 10–16, 2010
- Edition: 3rd
- Location: Bordeaux, France

Champions

Singles
- (France) Richard Gasquet

Doubles
- (France) Nicolas Mahut / (France) Édouard Roger-Vasselin
← 2009 ·	BNP Paribas Primrose Bordeaux	· 2011 →

The 2010 BNP Paribas Primrose Bordeaux was a professional tennis tournament played on outdoor red clay courts. It was part of the 2010 ATP Challenger Tour. It took place in Bordeaux, France between May 10 and May 16, 2010.

== Entrants ==
=== Seeds ===
Nationality	Player	Ranking*	Seeding
FRA	Michaël Llodra	56	1
BEL	Olivier Rochus	59	2
FRA	Florent Serra	64	3
UZB	Denis Istomin	81	4
FRA	Arnaud Clément	83	5
BEL	Xavier Malisse	84	6
FRA	Richard Gasquet	86	7
SVK	Karol Beck	87	8

- Rankings are as of May 3, 2010.

=== Other entrants ===
The following players received wildcards into the singles main draw:

- (France) Thierry Ascione
- (France) David Guez
- (France) Nicolas Mahut
- (France) Laurent Rochette

The following players received entry from the qualifying draw:

- (Spain) José Checa-Calvo
- (France) Benoît Paire
- (France) Olivier Patience
- (Brazil) Caio Zampieri

The following player received special exempt into the main draw:

- (Spain) Albert Ramos-Viñolas

== Champions ==
=== Singles ===
(France) Richard Gasquet def. (France) Michaël Llodra, 4–6, 6–1, 6–4

=== Doubles ===
(France) Nicolas Mahut / (France) Édouard Roger-Vasselin def. (Slovakia) Karol Beck / (Czech Republic) Leoš Friedl, 5–7, 6–3, [10–7]
