= 2010 Open Tarragona Costa Daurada =

- Date: 4–11 October
- Edition: 5th
- Location: Tarragona, Catalonia, Spain

Champions

Singles
- (Spain) Marcel Granollers

Doubles
- (Spain) Guillermo Olaso / (Spain) Pere Riba
- Open Tarragona Costa Daurada

The 2010 Open Tarragona Costa Daurada was a professional tennis tournament played on clay courts. It was the fifth edition of the tournament which was part of the 2010 ATP Challenger Tour. It took place in Tarragona, Catalonia, Spain between 4 and 11 October 2010.

== ATP entrants ==
=== Seeds ===
Country	Player	Rank^{1}	Seed
ESP	Marcel Granollers	76	1
ESP	Pablo Andújar	77	2
ESP	Pere Riba	79	3
POR	Frederico Gil	84	4
CZE	Jan Hájek	93	5
ESP	Albert Ramos-Viñolas	120	6
ESP	Daniel Muñoz de la Nava	133	7
FRA	Benoît Paire	145	8

- Rankings are as of September 27, 2010.

=== Other entrants ===
The following players received wildcards into the singles main draw:

- (Zimbabwe) Tinotenda Chanakira
- (Portugal) Frederico Gil
- (Spain) Marcel Granollers
- (Spain) Sergio Gutiérrez-Ferrol

The following players received entry from the qualifying draw:

- (Spain) Gerard Granollers-Pujol
- (France) Axel Michon
- (Spain) Marcelo Palacios
- (Netherlands) Boy Westerhof
- (Spain) José Checa-Calvo (Lucky loser replacing Óscar Hernández)
- (Spain) Jordi Samper-Montaña (Lucky loser replacing Lamine Ouahab)

== Champions ==
=== Singles ===
(Spain) Marcel Granollers def. (Czech Republic) Jaroslav Pospíšil, 1–6, 7–5, 6–0

=== Doubles ===
(Spain) Guillermo Olaso / (Spain) Pere Riba def. (Spain) Pablo Andújar / (Spain) Gerard Granollers-Pujol, 7–6(1), 4–6, [10–5]
