= 2010 BNP Paribas Primrose Bordeaux – Doubles =

Doubles
- 2010 BNP Paribas Primrose Bordeaux

Final
- Champions: (France) Nicolas Mahut (France) Édouard Roger-Vasselin
- Runners-up: (Slovakia) Karol Beck (Czech Republic) Leoš Friedl
- Score: 5–7, 6–3, [10–7]

Events
Singles	Doubles
← 2009 ·	BNP Paribas Primrose Bordeaux	· 2011 →

Pablo Cuevas and Horacio Zeballos were the defending champions. Cuevas chose to compete in Madrid and Zeballos chose not to compete this year.
Nicolas Mahut and Édouard Roger-Vasselin won in the final 5–7, 6–3, [10–7], against Karol Beck and Leoš Friedl.

== Seeds ==
1. (Czech Republic) Martin Damm / (Slovakia) Filip Polášek (first round)
2. (United Kingdom) Ross Hutchins / (Australia) Jordan Kerr (quarterfinals)
3. (United Kingdom) Colin Fleming / (United Kingdom) Ken Skupski (quarterfinals)
4. (India) Rohan Bopanna / (Pakistan) Aisam-ul-Haq Qureshi (quarterfinals)

== Draw ==
=== Key ===
- Q = Qualifier
- WC = Wild card
- LL = Lucky loser
- Alt = Alternate
- SE = Special exempt
- PR = Protected ranking
- ITF = ITF entry
- JE = Junior exempt
- w/o = Walkover
- r = Retired
- d = Defaulted
- SR = Special ranking

=== Draw ===
First round
1	(Czech Republic) M Damm (Slovakia) F Polášek	3	4
WC	(France) D Guez (France) J Ouanna	6	6
(Poland) T Bednarek (Poland) M Kowalczyk	6	6
WC	(France) R Jouan (France) B Paire	4	4
4	(India) R Bopanna (Pakistan) A-u-H Qureshi	7	6
WC	(France) A Mannarino (France) X Pujo	6^{4}	2
(Switzerland) Y Allegro (South Africa) J Coetzee	6^{3}	4
(Slovakia) K Beck (Czech Republic) L Friedl	7	6
(Germany) P Marx (Germany) F Moser	6	6
(Paraguay) R Delgado (Brazil) A Sá	4	4
(United States) S Lipsky (United States) D Martin	7	3	[2]
3	(United Kingdom) C Fleming (United Kingdom) K Skupski	6^{2}	6	[10]
(France) M Llodra (Belgium) O Rochus	4	4
(France) N Mahut (France) É Roger-Vasselin	6	6
(Argentina) S Prieto (Netherlands) R Wassen	5	6^{0}
2	(United Kingdom) R Hutchins (Australia) J Kerr	7	7

Quarterfinals
WC	(France) D Guez (France) J Ouanna	1	3
(Poland) T Bednarek (Poland) M Kowalczyk	6	6
4	(India) R Bopanna (Pakistan) A-u-H Qureshi	6^{4}	2
(Slovakia) K Beck (Czech Republic) L Friedl	7	6
(Germany) P Marx (Germany) F Moser	6	6
3	(United Kingdom) C Fleming (United Kingdom) K Skupski	4	4
(France) N Mahut (France) É Roger-Vasselin	6	3	[10]
2	(United Kingdom) R Hutchins (Australia) J Kerr	4	6	[7]

Semifinals
(Poland) T Bednarek (Poland) M Kowalczyk	3	4
(Slovakia) K Beck (Czech Republic) L Friedl	6	6
(Germany) P Marx (Germany) F Moser	6^{5}	2
(France) N Mahut (France) É Roger-Vasselin	7	6

Finals
(Slovakia) K Beck (Czech Republic) L Friedl	7	3	[7]
(France) N Mahut (France) É Roger-Vasselin	5	6	[10]
