= 2009 Yugra Cup =

- Date: 30 November – 6 December
- Edition: 1st
- Location: Khanty-Mansiysk, Russia

Champions

Singles
- (Russia) Konstantin Kravchuk

Doubles
- (Spain) Marcel Granollers / (Spain) Gerard Granollers-Pujol
Yugra Cup	· 2010 →

The 2009 Yugra Cup was a professional tennis tournament played on indoor carpet courts. It was the first edition of the tournament which was part of the 2009 ATP Challenger Tour. It took place in Khanty-Mansiysk, Russia between 30 November and 6 December 2009.

== ATP entrants ==
=== Seeds ===
Country	Player	Rank^{1}	Seed
ESP	Marcel Granollers	104	1
RUS	Alexander Kudryavtsev	223	2
ISR	Noam Okun	254	3
RUS	Evgeny Kirillov	291	4
IRL	Conor Niland	301	5
SVK	Ivo Klec	312	6
ROU	Petru-Alexandru Luncanu	313	7
RUS	Andrey Kumantsov	346	8

- Rankings are as of November 23, 2009.

=== Other entrants ===
The following players received wildcards into the singles main draw:

- (Russia) Ruslan Bekoev
- (Spain) Marcel Granollers
- (Russia) Anton Manegin
- (Russia) Yury Vaschenko

The following players received entry from the qualifying draw:

- (Russia) Mikhail Fufygin
- (Slovakia) Ivo Klec
- (Russia) Andrey Kumantsov
- (Russia) Artem Sitak

== Champions ==
=== Singles ===
(Russia) Konstantin Kravchuk def. (Spain) Marcel Granollers, 1–6, 6–3, 6–2

=== Doubles ===
(Spain) Marcel Granollers / (Spain) Gerard Granollers-Pujol def. (Russia) Evgeny Kirillov / (Russia) Andrey Kuznetsov, 6–3, 6–2
