= 2009 BNP Paribas Primrose Bordeaux =

Tennis tournament

- Date: May 11–17, 2010
- Edition: 2nd
- Location: Bordeaux, France

Champions

Singles
- (France) Marc Gicquel

Doubles
- (Uruguay) Pablo Cuevas / (Argentina) Horacio Zeballos
← 2008 ·	BNP Paribas Primrose Bordeaux	· 2010 →

The 2009 BNP Paribas Primrose Bordeaux was a professional tennis tournament played on outdoor red clay courts. It was part of the 2009 ATP Challenger Tour. It took place in Bordeaux, France between May 11 and May 17, 2009.

== Singles entrants ==
=== Seeds ===
Nationality	Player	Ranking*	Seeding
FRA	Fabrice Santoro	44	1
FRA	Marc Gicquel	51	2
FRA	Arnaud Clément	57	3
ARG	Diego Junqueira	73	4
FRA	Michaël Llodra	78	5
CHI	Paul Capdeville	91	6
USA	Wayne Odesnik	93	7
UZB	Denis Istomin	94	8

- Rankings are as of May 4, 2009.

=== Other entrants ===
The following players received wildcards into the singles main draw:

- (Argentina) Gastón Gaudio
- (France) Romain Jouan
- (France) Mathieu Rodrigues
- (France) Alexandre Sidorenko

The following players received entry from the qualifying draw:

- (France) Thierry Ascione
- (Monaco) Jean-René Lisnard
- (France) Nicolas Renavand
- (France) Stéphane Robert

The following player received special exempt into the main draw:

- (South Africa) Kevin Anderson
- (Kazakhstan) Yuri Schukin

== Champions ==
=== Singles ===
(France) Marc Gicquel def. (France) Mathieu Montcourt, 3–6, 6–1, 6–4

=== Doubles ===
(Uruguay) Pablo Cuevas / (Argentina) Horacio Zeballos def. (France) Xavier Pujo / (France) Stéphane Robert, 4–6, 6–4, [10–4]
