= 2011 BNP Paribas Primrose Bordeaux – Singles =

Singles
- 2011 BNP Paribas Primrose Bordeaux

Final
- Champion: (France) Marc Gicquel
- Runner-up: (Argentina) Horacio Zeballos
- Score: 6–2, 6–4

Events
Singles	Doubles
← 2010 ·	BNP Paribas Primrose Bordeaux	· 2012 →

Richard Gasquet was the defending champion but chose to compete in Rome instead.
Marc Gicquel won the title, defeating Horacio Zeballos 6–2, 6–4 in the final.

== Seeds ==
1. (France) Jérémy Chardy (quarterfinals)
2. (Belgium) Olivier Rochus (first round)
3. (France) Julien Benneteau (semifinals)
4. (France) Nicolas Mahut (quarterfinals)
5. (United States) Alex Bogomolov Jr. (first round, retired)
6. (Germany) Mischa Zverev (second round, retired)
7. (France) Benoît Paire (second round)
8. (France) Florent Serra (quarterfinals)

== Draw ==
=== Key ===
- Q = Qualifier
- WC = Wild card
- LL = Lucky loser
- Alt = Alternate
- SE = Special exempt
- PR = Protected ranking
- ITF = ITF entry
- JE = Junior exempt
- w/o = Walkover
- r = Retired
- d = Defaulted
- SR = Special ranking

=== Finals ===
Semifinals
WC	(France) Marc Gicquel	1	6	6
3	(France) Julien Benneteau	6	2	3
(Argentina) Horacio Zeballos	6	6
Q	(France) Stéphane Robert	3	4

Final
WC	(France) Marc Gicquel	6	6
(Argentina) Horacio Zeballos	2	4

=== Top half ===
First round
1	(France) J Chardy	6	3	7
(Argentina) E Schwank	3	6	6^{5}
(Netherlands) J Huta Galung	6	7
Q	(Argentina) J Acasuso	4	6^{2}
WC	(France) M Gicquel	3	6	7
(Czech Republic) L Rosol	6	4	6^{2}
Q	(France) D Guez	5	6	3
6	(Germany) M Zverev	7	2	6
3	(France) J Benneteau	6	1	7
(Russia) A Kudryavtsev	4	6	6^{5}
(Brazil) R Dutra da Silva	6	3	7
(Colombia) A Falla	4	6	5
LL	(Spain) R Bautista-Agut	4	2
(Chile) P Capdeville	6	6
(France) A Clément	4	2
7	(France) B Paire	6	6

Second round
1	(France) J Chardy	6	7
(Netherlands) J Huta Galung	3	6^{2}
WC	(France) M Gicquel	5
6	(Germany) M Zverev	0^{r}
3	(France) J Benneteau	7	7
(Brazil) R Dutra da Silva	6^{3}	6^{4}
(Chile) P Capdeville	6	4	6
7	(France) B Paire	3	6	3

Quarterfinals
1	(France) J Chardy	6^{2}	7	6^{1}
WC	(France) M Gicquel	7	6^{1}	7
3	(France) J Benneteau	6	6
(Chile) P Capdeville	3	1

Semifinals
WC	(France) M Gicquel	1	6	6
3	(France) J Benneteau	6	2	3

=== Bottom half ===
First round
5	(United States) A Bogomolov Jr.	3	0^{r}
(Argentina) H Zeballos	6	3
(Belgium) S Darcis	4	1^{r}
WC	(France) R Jouan	6	2
(Kazakhstan) Y Schukin	6	6
(Ukraine) I Marchenko	1	2
WC	(France) M Teixeira	5	4
4	(France) N Mahut	7	6
8	(France) F Serra	4	6	6
Q	(Colombia) C Salamanca	6	3	1
WC	(France) J Eysseric	6
SE	(Chile) F González	3^{r}
Q	(France) S Robert	6	6^{4}	6
(Australia) M Matosevic	1	7	4
(Portugal) R Machado	3	6	6
2	(Belgium) O Rochus	6	3	4

Second round
(Argentina) H Zeballos	6	4	6
WC	(France) R Jouan	2	6	4
(Kazakhstan) Y Schukin	4	3
4	(France) N Mahut	6	6
8	(France) F Serra	6	3	6
WC	(France) J Eysseric	4	6	3
Q	(France) S Robert	6	6
(Portugal) R Machado	4	4

Quarterfinals
(Argentina) H Zeballos	6	6
4	(France) N Mahut	3	4
8	(France) F Serra	5	4
Q	(France) S Robert	7	6

Semifinals
(Argentina) H Zeballos	6	6
Q	(France) S Robert	3	4
