= Ipsos Bucharest Challenger =

ATP Challenger Tour
- Location: Bucharest, Romania
- Venue: Arenele BNR
- Category: ATP Challenger Tour
- Surface: Clay / Outdoors
- Draw: 32S/32Q/16D
- Prize money: €30,000
- Website: http://www.ipsoschallenger.ro/

The Ipsos Bucharest Challenger was a tennis tournament held in Bucharest, Romania held in 2007 and 2008. The event was part of the ATP Challenger Tour and was played on outdoor clay courts.

== Past finals ==
=== Singles ===
| Year | Champion | Runner-up | Score |
|---|---|---|---|
| 2007 | (Romania) Victor Hănescu | (Spain) Marcel Granollers | 7–6, 6–1 |
| 2008 | (Spain) Santiago Ventura | (Romania) Victor Crivoi | 5–7, 6–4, 6–2 |

=== Doubles ===
| Year | Champions | Runners-up | Score |
|---|---|---|---|
| 2007 | (Spain) Marcel Granollers (Spain) Santiago Ventura | (Romania) Florin Mergea (Romania) Horia Tecău | 6–2, 6–1 |
| 2008 | (Spain) Rubén Ramírez Hidalgo (Spain) Santiago Ventura | (Italy) Andrea Arnaboldi (Argentina) Máximo González | 6–3, 5–7, [10–6] |
