= 2011 BNP Paribas Primrose Bordeaux – Doubles =

Doubles
- 2011 BNP Paribas Primrose Bordeaux

Final
- Champions: (United Kingdom) Jamie Delgado (United Kingdom) Jonathan Marray
- Runners-up: (France) Julien Benneteau (France) Nicolas Mahut
- Score: 7–5, 6–3

Events
Singles	Doubles
← 2010 ·	BNP Paribas Primrose Bordeaux	· 2012 →

Nicolas Mahut and Édouard Roger-Vasselin were the defending champions; however, Roger-Vasselin chose not to compete this year.
As a result, Mahut played alongside Julien Benneteau. They reached the final, where they lost to Jamie Delgado and Jonathan Marray.

== Seeds ==
1. (Germany) Michael Kohlmann / (Austria) Alexander Peya (quarterfinals)
2. (United States) James Cerretani / (Canada) Adil Shamasdin (first round)
3. (France) Julien Benneteau / (France) Nicolas Mahut (final)
4. (United Kingdom) Jamie Delgado / (United Kingdom) Jonathan Marray (champions)

== Draw ==
=== Key ===
- Q = Qualifier
- WC = Wild card
- LL = Lucky loser
- Alt = Alternate
- SE = Special exempt
- PR = Protected ranking
- ITF = ITF entry
- JE = Junior exempt
- w/o = Walkover
- r = Retired
- d = Defaulted
- SR = Special ranking

=== Draw ===
First round
1	(Germany) M Kohlmann (Austria) A Peya	6	6
(United States) B Battistone (Portugal) R Machado	4	4
(Sweden) J Brunström (Sweden) A Siljeström	4	4
(France) J Chardy (France) S Robert	6	6
3	(France) J Benneteau (France) N Mahut	7	6
WC	(France) K de Schepper (France) Laurent Rochette	5	2
WC	(France) M Gicquel (Belgium) O Rochus	1	6^{7}
(Russia) M Elgin (Russia) A Kudryavtsev	6	7
Alt	(Colombia) JS Cabal (Colombia) R Farah	7	6^{5}	[10]
(Australia) R Junaid (Germany) P Marx	6^{4}	7	[6]
(Philippines) TC Huey (Germany) F Moser	6	6^{5}	[10]
4	(United Kingdom) J Delgado (United Kingdom) J Marray	4	7	[12]
WC	(France) P-H Herbert (France) N Renavand	6	6
(Argentina) L Arnold Ker (Argentina) H Zeballos	4	3
(Australia) P Hanley (Australia) J Kerr	6	6
2	(United States) J Cerretani (Canada) A Shamasdin	3	4

Quarterfinals
1	(Germany) M Kohlmann (Austria) A Peya	3	3
(France) J Chardy (France) S Robert	6	6
3	(France) J Benneteau (France) N Mahut	6	6
(Russia) M Elgin (Russia) A Kudryavtsev	3	4
Alt	(Colombia) JS Cabal (Colombia) R Farah	3	6	[6]
4	(United Kingdom) J Delgado (United Kingdom) J Marray	6	1	[10]
WC	(France) P-H Herbert (France) N Renavand	4	7	[10]
(Australia) P Hanley (Australia) J Kerr	6	6^{5}	[8]

Semifinals
(France) J Chardy (France) S Robert	3	5
3	(France) J Benneteau (France) N Mahut	6	7
4	(United Kingdom) J Delgado (United Kingdom) J Marray	6	7
WC	(France) P-H Herbert (France) N Renavand	3	5

Finals
3	(France) J Benneteau (France) N Mahut	5	3
4	(United Kingdom) J Delgado (United Kingdom) J Marray	7	6
