= 2012 BNP Paribas Primrose Bordeaux – Singles =

Singles
- 2012 BNP Paribas Primrose Bordeaux
- 2011 Champion: (France) Marc Gicquel

Final
- Champion: (Slovakia) Martin Kližan
- Runner-up: (Russia) Teymuraz Gabashvili
- Score: 7–5, 6–3

Events
Singles	Doubles
← 2011 ·	BNP Paribas Primrose Bordeaux	· 2013 →

Marc Gicquel was the defending champion, but he lost in the Second Round to Nicolas Mahut 3–6, 5–7.
Martin Kližan won the title defeating Teymuraz Gabashvili in the final 7–5, 6–3.

== Seeds ==
1. (France) Jérémy Chardy (second round)
2. (Belgium) Steve Darcis (second round)
3. (France) Benoît Paire (first round)
4. (Argentina) Leonardo Mayer (first round)
5. (Spain) Rubén Ramírez Hidalgo (first round)
6. (France) Édouard Roger-Vasselin (first round)
7. (Germany) Björn Phau (first round)
8. (Portugal) Rui Machado (first round)

== Draw ==
=== Key ===
- Q = Qualifier
- WC = Wild card
- LL = Lucky loser
- Alt = Alternate
- SE = Special exempt
- PR = Protected ranking
- ITF = ITF entry
- JE = Junior exempt
- w/o = Walkover
- r = Retired
- d = Defaulted
- SR = Special ranking

=== Finals ===
Semifinals
(Slovakia) Martin Kližan	6	7^{7}
(Spain) Roberto Bautista-Agut	1	6^{2}
Q	(Russia) Teymuraz Gabashvili	6	6
(Czech Republic) Lukáš Rosol	4	4

Final
(Slovakia) Martin Kližan	7	6
Q	(Russia) Teymuraz Gabashvili	5	3

=== Top half ===
First round
1	(France) J Chardy	4	6	6
Q	(France) P-H Herbert	6	4	4
Q	(Colombia) C Salamanca	2	2
(Slovakia) M Kližan	6	6
SE	(Belgium) R Bemelmans	6	5
WC	(France) J Ouanna	7	7
(Estonia) J Zopp	6	6
5	(Spain) R Ramírez Hidalgo	2	3
3	(France) B Paire	1	6	4
WC	(France) F Serra	6	2	6
(Australia) M Matosevic	2	6	6
(Turkey) M İlhan	6	3	4
(Spain) R Bautista-Agut	6	6
(France) S Robert	3	3
(Argentina) H Zeballos	6	6
7	(Germany) B Phau	3	2

Second round
1	(France) J Chardy	2	6	3
(Slovakia) M Kližan	6	4	6
WC	(France) J Ouanna	2	2
(Estonia) J Zopp	6	6
WC	(France) F Serra	0	1
(Australia) M Matosevic	6	6
(Spain) R Bautista-Agut	6	6^{7}	6
(Argentina) H Zeballos	2	7^{9}	1

Quarterfinals
(Slovakia) M Kližan	6	6^{4}	7^{7}
(Estonia) J Zopp	3	7^{7}	6^{5}
(Australia) M Matosevic	3	4
(Spain) R Bautista-Agut	6	6

Semifinals
(Slovakia) M Kližan	6	7^{7}
(Spain) R Bautista-Agut	1	6^{2}

=== Bottom half ===
First round
6	(France) É Roger-Vasselin	6^{2}	6^{6}
Q	(Russia) T Gabashvili	7^{7}	7^{8}
(France) A Clément	7^{7}	6
(South Africa) R de Voest	6^{5}	3
SE	(Chinese Taipei) T-h Yang	4	1
WC	(France) M Gicquel	6	6
(France) N Mahut	6	6
4	(Argentina) L Mayer	3	2
8	(Portugal) R Machado	6^{6}	6^{4}
WC	(France) P-H Mathieu	7^{8}	7^{7}
(Brazil) R Dutra da Silva	6	3	6
(United States) M Russell	2	6	3
(Belgium) D Goffin	6	5	3
(Czech Republic) L Rosol	2	7	6
Q	(Portugal) G Elias	4	6	6^{2}
2	(Belgium) S Darcis	6	1	7^{7}

Second round
Q	(Russia) T Gabashvili	w/o
(France) A Clément
WC	(France) M Gicquel	3	5
(France) N Mahut	6	7
WC	(France) P-H Mathieu	6	6
(Brazil) R Dutra da Silva	4	3
(Czech Republic) L Rosol	3	6	6
2	(Belgium) S Darcis	6	3	2

Quarterfinals
Q	(Russia) T Gabashvili	6	6
(France) N Mahut	4	3
WC	(France) P-H Mathieu	4	1
(Czech Republic) L Rosol	6	6

Semifinals
Q	(Russia) T Gabashvili	6	6
(Czech Republic) L Rosol	4	4
