= 2009 BNP Paribas Primrose Bordeaux – Singles =

Singles
- 2009 BNP Paribas Primrose Bordeaux

Final
- Champion: (France) Marc Gicquel
- Runner-up: (France) Mathieu Montcourt
- Score: 3–6, 6–1, 6–4

Events
Singles	Doubles
← 2008 ·	BNP Paribas Primrose Bordeaux	· 2010 →

Eduardo Schwank was the defending champion; however, he didn't take part in tournament this year.
Marc Gicquel won in the final 3–6, 6–1, 6–4, against Mathieu Montcourt.

== Seeds ==
1. (France) Fabrice Santoro (second round)
2. (France) Marc Gicquel (champion)
3. (France) Arnaud Clément (quarterfinals)
4. (Argentina) Diego Junqueira (first round)
5. (France) Michaël Llodra (second round)
6. (Chile) Paul Capdeville (first round)
7. (United States) Wayne Odesnik (second round)
8. (Uzbekistan) Denis Istomin (first round)

== Draw ==
=== Key ===
- Q = Qualifier
- WC = Wild card
- LL = Lucky loser
- Alt = Alternate
- SE = Special exempt
- PR = Protected ranking
- ITF = ITF entry
- JE = Junior exempt
- w/o = Walkover
- r = Retired
- d = Defaulted
- SR = Special ranking

=== Final four ===
Semifinals
(France) Laurent Recouderc	4	5
(France) Mathieu Montcourt	6	7
(Kazakhstan) Andrey Golubev	6^{4}	3
2	(France) Marc Gicquel	7	6

Final
(France) Mathieu Montcourt	6	1	4
2	(France) Marc Gicquel	3	6	6

=== Top half ===
First round
1	(France) F Santoro	7	2	7
(Czech Republic) L Rosol	6^{5}	6	6^{5}
Q	(Monaco) J-R Lisnard	2	6^{4}
WC	(Argentina) G Gaudio	6	7
(France) L Recouderc	2	6	6
(Spain) S Ventura	6	0	2
Q	(France) N Renavand	2	2
7	(United States) W Odesnik	6	6
3	(France) A Clément	6	7
(Italy) F Volandri	1	6^{2}
(Italy) T Tenconi	6	3	3
(Argentina) S Roitman	3	6	6
(France) M Montcourt	6^{5}	6	6
(Uruguay) P Cuevas	7	2	2
WC	(France) A Sidorenko	5	3
5	(France) M Llodra	7	6

Second round
1	(France) F Santoro	6	6^{7}	2
WC	(Argentina) G Gaudio	4	7	6
(France) L Recouderc	7	7
7	(United States) W Odesnik	6^{4}	5
3	(France) A Clément	6	6
(Argentina) S Roitman	2	2
(France) M Montcourt	6	3	7
5	(France) M Llodra	0	6	6^{10}

Quarterfinals
WC	(Argentina) G Gaudio	6	4	4
(France) L Recouderc	2	6	6
3	(France) A Clément	3	4
(France) M Montcourt	6	6

Semifinals
(France) L Recouderc	4	5
(France) M Montcourt	6	7

=== Bottom half ===
First round
8	(Uzbekistan) D Istomin	4	4
(France) J Ouanna	6	6
WC	(France) M Rodrigues	2	6	2
(Switzerland) S Bohli	6	0	6
(France) É Roger-Vasselin	4	6	7
(Argentina) H Zeballos	6	3	5
(Kazakhstan) A Golubev	6	7
4	(Argentina) D Junqueira	1	6^{5}
6	(Chile) P Capdeville	2	6^{4}
(France) N Mahut	6	7
SE	(Kazakhstan) Y Schukin	6^{5}	6	6
SE	(South Africa) K Anderson	7	3	1
Q	(France) S Robert	6^{2}	3
Q	(France) T Ascione	7	6
WC	(France) R Jouan	4	4
2	(France) M Gicquel	6	6

Second round
(France) J Ouanna	7	7
(Switzerland) S Bohli	6^{6}	6^{1}
(France) É Roger-Vasselin	3	6^{5}
(Kazakhstan) A Golubev	6	7
(France) N Mahut	6^{7}	6^{3}
SE	(Kazakhstan) Y Schukin	7	7
Q	(France) T Ascione	7	2	4
2	(France) M Gicquel	6^{6}	6	6

Quarterfinals
(France) J Ouanna	3	3
(Kazakhstan) A Golubev	6	6
SE	(Kazakhstan) Y Schukin	2	2
2	(France) M Gicquel	6	6

Semifinals
(Kazakhstan) A Golubev	6^{4}	3
2	(France) M Gicquel	7	6
