= 2011 BNP Paribas Primrose Bordeaux =

- Date: May 7–15, 2011
- Edition: 4th
- Location: Bordeaux, France

Champions

Singles
- (France) Marc Gicquel

Doubles
- (United Kingdom) Jamie Delgado / (United Kingdom) Jonathan Marray
← 2010 ·	BNP Paribas Primrose Bordeaux	· 2012 →

The 2011 BNP Paribas Primrose Bordeaux was a professional tennis tournament played on outdoor red clay courts. It was the fourth edition of the tournament. It was part of the 2011 ATP Challenger Tour. It took place in Bordeaux, France between May 7 and May 15, 2011.

== Entrants ==
=== Seeds ===
Nationality	Player	Ranking*	Seeding
FRA	Jérémy Chardy	53	1
BEL	Olivier Rochus	74	2
FRA	Julien Benneteau	88	3
FRA	Nicolas Mahut	90	4
USA	Alex Bogomolov Jr.	91	5
GER	Mischa Zverev	94	6
FRA	Benoît Paire	99	7
FRA	Florent Serra	100	8

- Rankings are as of May 2, 2011.

=== Other entrants ===
The following players received wildcards into the singles main draw:

- (France) Jonathan Eysseric
- (France) Marc Gicquel
- (France) Romain Jouan
- (France) Maxime Teixeira

The following players received entry as a special exempt into the singles main draw:

- (Chile) Fernando González

The following players received entry from the qualifying draw:

- (Argentina) José Acasuso
- (France) David Guez
- (France) Stéphane Robert
- (Colombia) Carlos Salamanca

== Champions ==
=== Singles ===
(France) Marc Gicquel def. (Argentina) Horacio Zeballos, 6–2, 6–4

=== Doubles ===
(United Kingdom) Jamie Delgado / (United Kingdom) Jonathan Marray def. (France) Julien Benneteau / (France) Nicolas Mahut, 7–5, 6–3
