= 2008 U.S. Men's Clay Court Championships – Doubles =

Doubles
- 2008 U.S. Men's Clay Court Championships

Final
- Champions: (Latvia) Ernests Gulbis (Germany) Rainer Schüttler
- Runners-up: (Uruguay) Pablo Cuevas (Spain) Marcel Granollers-Pujol
- Score: 7–5, 7–6^{(7–3)}

Details
- Draw: 16
- Seeds: 4

Events
Singles	Doubles
- U.S. Men's Clay Court Championships

Bob Bryan and Mike Bryan were the defending champions, but chose not to participate that year.

Ernests Gulbis and Rainer Schüttler won in the final 7–5, 7–6^{(7–3)}, against Pablo Cuevas and Marcel Granollers-Pujol.

== Seeds ==
1. (United States) Scott Lipsky / (United States) David Martin (first round)
2. (United States) Eric Butorac / (Australia) Ashley Fisher (first round)
3. (Uruguay) Pablo Cuevas / (Spain) Marcel Granollers-Pujol (final)
4. (Israel) Harel Levy / (United States) Jim Thomas (first round)

== Draw ==
Key

- Q = Qualifier
- WC = Wild card
- LL = Lucky loser
- Alt = Alternate
- ITF = ITF entry
- PR = Protected ranking
- SR = Special ranking
- SE = Special exempt
- JE = Junior exempt
- JR = Junior Accelerator Programme entrant
- CO = College Accelerator Programme entrant
- NG = Next Gen Accelerator Program entrant
- w/o = Walkover
- r = Retired
- d = Defaulted

=== Draw ===
First round
1	(United States) S Lipsky (United States) D Martin	6	4	[8]
(Australia) P Luczak (United States) V Spadea	4	6	[10]
WC	(United States) H Armando (United States) W Odesnik	6	7
WC	(United States) R Harrison (Japan) K Nishikori	4	6^{5}
4	(Israel) H Levy (United States) J Thomas	5	0
(Latvia) E Gulbis (Germany) R Schüttler	7	6
ALT	(United States) A Reichel (United States) C Wettengel	2	3
(South Africa) C Haggard (Russia) I Kunitsyn	6	6
(Argentina) A Calleri (Argentina) D Hartfield	7	4	[13]
(United States) A Delic (United States) J Isner	6^{6}	6	[11]
(United States) J Blake (United States) M Fish	2	2
3	(Uruguay) P Cuevas (Spain) M Granollers-Pujol	6	6
(Israel) D Sela (Serbia) V Troicki	5	2
(Argentina) C Berlocq (Spain) Ó Hernández	7	6
(Brazil) M Daniel (Argentina) S Roitman	3	6	[12]
2	(United States) E Butorac (Australia) A Fisher	6	3	[10]

Quarterfinals
(Australia) P Luczak (United States) V Spadea	6^{5}	6	[7]
WC	(United States) H Armando (United States) W Odesnik	7	1	[10]
(Latvia) E Gulbis (Germany) R Schüttler	6	6^{4}	[10]
(South Africa) C Haggard (Russia) I Kunitsyn	2	7	[8]
(Argentina) A Calleri (Argentina) D Hartfield	6^{6}	4
3	(Uruguay) P Cuevas (Spain) M Granollers-Pujol	7	6
(Argentina) C Berlocq (Spain) Ó Hernández	6	3	[8]
(Brazil) M Daniel (Argentina) S Roitman	1	6	[10]

Semifinals
WC	(United States) H Armando (United States) W Odesnik	2	4
(Latvia) E Gulbis (Germany) R Schüttler	6	6
3	(Uruguay) P Cuevas (Spain) M Granollers-Pujol	6	6
(Brazil) M Daniel (Argentina) S Roitman	0	2

Final
(Latvia) E Gulbis (Germany) R Schüttler	7	7
3	(Uruguay) P Cuevas (Spain) M Granollers-Pujol	5	6^{3}
