= 2008 U.S. Men's Clay Court Championships – Singles =

Singles
- 2008 U.S. Men's Clay Court Championships

Final
- Champion: (Spain) Marcel Granollers Pujol
- Runner-up: (United States) James Blake
- Score: 6–4, 1–6, 7–5

Details
- Draw: 32 (4Q / 3WC)
- Seeds: 8

Events
Singles	Doubles
- U.S. Men's Clay Court Championships

Ivo Karlović was the defending champion but chose not to participate that year.

Seventh-seeded Marcel Granollers Pujol won in the final 6–4, 1–6, 7–5, against James Blake.

== Seeds ==
1. (United States) James Blake (final)
2. (Germany) Tommy Haas (first round)
3. (United States) Mardy Fish (quarterfinals)
4. (United States) Sam Querrey (first round)
5. (Argentina) Agustín Calleri (quarterfinals)
6. (Israel) Dudi Sela (second round)
7. (Spain) Marcel Granollers Pujol (champion)
8. (Spain) Óscar Hernández (semifinals)

== Draw ==
Key

- Q = Qualifier
- WC = Wild card
- LL = Lucky loser
- Alt = Alternate
- ITF = ITF entry
- PR = Protected ranking
- SR = Special ranking
- SE = Special exempt
- JE = Junior exempt
- JR = Junior Accelerator Programme entrant
- CO = College Accelerator Programme entrant
- NG = Next Gen Accelerator Program entrant
- w/o = Walkover
- r = Retired
- d = Defaulted

=== Finals ===
Semifinals
1	(United States) James Blake	6	7
8	(Spain) Óscar Hernández	3	6^{3}
7	(Spain) Marcel Granollers Pujol	3	7	6
(United States) Wayne Odesnik	6	5	3

Final
1	(United States) James Blake	4	6	5
7	(Spain) Marcel Granollers Pujol	6	1	7

=== Top half ===
First round
1	(United States) J Blake	6	6
WC	(Japan) K Nishikori	4	4
Q	(United States) R Harrison	6	6
(Uruguay) P Cuevas	4	3
(Chile) P Capdeville	6	6
Q	(Argentina) D Hartfield	0	4
(United States) V Spadea	4	3
5	(Argentina) A Calleri	6	6
3	(United States) M Fish	7	6
(Germany) R Schüttler	6^{4}	3
(Argentina) C Berlocq	3	6	5
WC	(United States) H Armando	6	4	7
Q	(Spain) F Vicente	3	6^{5}
(United States) D Young	6	7
(Argentina) JP Brzezicki	6	3	2
8	(Spain) Ó Hernández	3	6	6

Second round
1	(United States) J Blake	6	6
Q	(United States) R Harrison	3	2
(Chile) P Capdeville	2	1
5	(Argentina) A Calleri	6	6
3	(United States) M Fish	6	6
WC	(United States) H Armando	3	2
(United States) D Young	4	4
8	(Spain) Ó Hernández	6	6

Quarterfinals
1	(United States) J Blake	6	6
5	(Argentina) A Calleri	4	3
3	(United States) M Fish	2	6^{5}
8	(Spain) Ó Hernández	6	7

Semifinals
1	(United States) J Blake	6	7
8	(Spain) Ó Hernández	3	6^{3}

=== Bottom half ===
First round
7	(Spain) M Granollers Pujol	6	6
(Latvia) E Gulbis	2	0
(Australia) P Luczak	6	6
Q	(Israel) H Levy	4	4
(Serbia) V Troicki	3	4
(Brazil) M Daniel	6	6
(Chile) N Massú	5	6	6
4	(United States) S Querrey	7	4	4
6	(Israel) D Sela	7	6
(United States) R Ginepri	6^{5}	2
(United States) W Odesnik	6	6
WC	(United States) A Delić	3	3
(Argentina) S Roitman	3	7	6
(United States) J Isner	6	6^{6}	3
(Russia) I Kunitsyn	5	6	6
2	(Germany) T Haas	7	4	4

Second round
7	(Spain) M Granollers Pujol	6	6
(Australia) P Luczak	3	2
(Brazil) M Daniel	7	6
(Chile) N Massú	6^{3}	2
6	(Israel) D Sela	3	5
(United States) W Odesnik	6	7
(Argentina) S Roitman	6	7
(Russia) I Kunitsyn	3	6^{3}

Quarterfinals
7	(Spain) M Granollers Pujol	6	6
(Brazil) M Daniel	3	2
(United States) W Odesnik	2	7	6
(Argentina) S Roitman	6	6^{4}	1

Semifinals
7	(Spain) M Granollers Pujol	3	7	6
(United States) W Odesnik	6	5	3
