= 2009 BNP Paribas Primrose Bordeaux – Doubles =

Doubles
- 2009 BNP Paribas Primrose Bordeaux

Final
- Champions: (Uruguay) Pablo Cuevas (Argentina) Horacio Zeballos
- Runners-up: (France) Xavier Pujo (France) Stéphane Robert
- Score: 4–6, 6–4, 10–4

Events
Singles	Doubles
← 2008 ·	BNP Paribas Primrose Bordeaux	· 2010 →

Diego Hartfield and Sergio Roitman were the defending champions. They didn't participate this year.
Pablo Cuevas and Horacio Zeballos won in the final. They defeated Xavier Pujo and Stéphane Robert 4–6, 6–4, 10–4.

== Seeds ==
1. (United States) James Cerretani / (Czech Republic) Jaroslav Levinský (quarterfinals)
2. (Sweden) ~~Johan Brunström~~ / (Netherlands Antilles) ~~Jean-Julien Rojer~~ (withdrew)
3. (Uruguay) Pablo Cuevas / (Argentina) Horacio Zeballos (champions)
4. (Australia) Rameez Junaid / (Germany) Philipp Marx (first round)

== Draw ==
=== Key ===
- Q = Qualifier
- WC = Wild card
- LL = Lucky loser
- Alt = Alternate
- SE = Special exempt
- PR = Protected ranking
- ITF = ITF entry
- JE = Junior exempt
- w/o = Walkover
- r = Retired
- d = Defaulted
- SR = Special ranking

=== Draw ===
First round
1	(United States) J Cerretani (Czech Republic) J Levinský
(South Africa) K Anderson (Switzerland) J-C Scherrer	w/o
(Germany) F Moser (Czech Republic) L Rosol	4	4
(France) M Gicquel (France) N Mahut	6	6
3	(Uruguay) P Cuevas (Argentina) H Zeballos	6	6
(Chile) P Capdeville (Argentina) D Junqueira	4	3
(France) T Ascione (France) J Ouanna	2	6	[8]
WC	(France) R Jouan (France) M Montcourt	6	3	[10]
(Argentina) S Roitman (Italy) T Tenconi	4	7	[6]
(France) A Clément (France) É Roger-Vasselin	6	5	[10]
WC	(France) A Gensse (France) N Renavand	4	6	[10]
4	(Australia) R Junaid (Germany) P Marx	6	3	[4]
(France) F Santoro (France) A Sidorenko	4	4
(Kazakhstan) A Golubev (Uzbekistan) D Istomin	6	6
WC	(France) X Pujo (France) S Robert	5	6	[10]
ALT	(United States) W Odesnik (Russia) D Sitak	7	4	[5]

Quarterfinals
1	(United States) J Cerretani (Czech Republic) J Levinský	3	2
(France) M Gicquel (France) N Mahut	6	6
3	(Uruguay) P Cuevas (Argentina) H Zeballos	6	5	[10]
WC	(France) R Jouan (France) M Montcourt	4	7	[3]
(France) A Clément (France) É Roger-Vasselin	6	6
WC	(France) A Gensse (France) N Renavand	3	0
(Kazakhstan) A Golubev (Uzbekistan) D Istomin	3	6^{3}
WC	(France) X Pujo (France) S Robert	6	7

Semifinals
(France) M Gicquel (France) N Mahut	2	6	[7]
3	(Uruguay) P Cuevas (Argentina) H Zeballos	6	3	[10]
(France) A Clément (France) É Roger-Vasselin	4	4
WC	(France) X Pujo (France) S Robert	6	6

Finals
3	(Uruguay) P Cuevas (Argentina) H Zeballos	4	6	[10]
WC	(France) X Pujo (France) S Robert	6	4	[4]
