= Yugra Cup =

Tournament information
- Location: Khanty-Mansiysk, Russia
- Surface: Carpet (indoor)
ATP Tour
- Category: ATP Challenger Tour
- Draw: 32S / 17Q / 16D
- Prize money: $50,000+H
WTA Tour
- Category: ITF Women's Circuit
- Draw: 32S / 32Q / 16D
- Prize money: $50,000

The Yugra Cup was a professional tennis tournament played on indoor carpet courts. It was part of the Association of Tennis Professionals (ATP) Challenger Tour and the International Tennis Federation (ITF) Women's Circuit. It was held in Khanty-Mansiysk, Russia, in 2009 and 2010. The men's edition was held in December, while the women's edition was held in March.

== Past finals ==
=== Men's singles ===
Year	Champion	Runner-up	Score
2009	(Russia) Konstantin Kravchuk	(Spain) Marcel Granollers	1–6, 6–3, 6–2

=== Women's singles ===
Year	Champion	Runner-up	Score
2010	(Russia) Anna Lapushchenkova	(Ukraine) Lyudmyla Kichenok	6–2, 6–2
2009	(Russia) Evgeniya Rodina	(Russia) Anna Lapushchenkova	6–3, 6–2

=== Men's doubles ===
Year	Champions	Runners-up	Score
2009	(Spain) Marcel Granollers (Spain) Gerard Granollers-Pujol	(Russia) Evgeny Kirillov (Russia) Andrey Kuznetsov	6–3, 6–2

=== Women's doubles ===
Year	Champions	Runners-up	Score
2010	(Russia) Alexandra Panova (Russia) Ksenia Pervak	(Ukraine) Lyudmyla Kichenok (Ukraine) Nadiya Kichenok	7–6^{(9–7)}, 2–6, [10–7]
2009	(Belarus) Ksenia Milevskaya (Ukraine) Lesya Tsurenko	(Georgia (country)) Oksana Kalashnikova (Russia) Valeria Savinykh	6–2, 6–3
