= Xavier Pujo =

French tennis player (born 1977)

- Country (sports): France
- Residence: Bordeaux, France
- Born: 5 December 1977 (age 48) Paris, France
- Plays: Right-handed
- Prize money: $60,262

Singles
- Career record: 0–0
- Career titles: 7 ITF
- Highest ranking: No. 279 (14 July 2003)

Grand Slam singles results
- French Open: Q2 (2003)

Doubles
- Career record: 0–0
- Career titles: 1 Challenger, 10 ITF
- Highest ranking: No. 342 (18 February 2008)
- Last updated on: 26 August 2019.

Xavier Pujo (born 5 December 1977) is a French coach and a former tennis player.

Pujo has a career high ATP singles ranking of 279 achieved on 14 July 2003. He also has a career high doubles ranking of 342 achieved on 18 February 2008.

Pujo has won 1 ATP Challenger doubles title at the 2007 Saint-Brieuc Challenger.

== Challenger finals ==
=== Doubles: 3 (1–2) ===
Result	W–L	Date	Tournament	Tier	Surface	Partner	Opponents	Score
Win	1–0	Apr 2007	Saint-Brieuc Challenger, France	Challenger	Clay	(France) Jean-Baptiste Perlant	(France) Jean-Christophe Faurel (France) Jérôme Haehnel	2–6, 6–2, [10–7]
Loss	1–1	May 2007	Dresden Challenger, Germany	Challenger	Clay	(France) Jean-Baptiste Perlant	(Germany) Tomas Behrend (Germany) Christopher Kas	3–6, 4–6
Loss	1–2	May 2009	Bordeaux Challenger, France	Challenger	Clay	(France) Stéphane Robert	(Uruguay) Pablo Cuevas (Argentina) Horacio Zeballos	6–4, 4–6, [4–10]
