= Open Tarragona Costa Daurada =

Defunct tennis tournament
- Tour: ATP Challenger Tour
- Founded: 2006
- Abolished: 2010
- Editions: 5
- Location: Tarragona, Catalonia, Spain
- Venue: Club de Tennis Tarragona
- Surface: Clay / outdoor
- Website: Official Website

The Open Tarragona Costa Daurada was a tennis tournament held in Tarragona, Spain since 2006. The event was part of the ATP Challenger Tour and was played on outdoor clay courts. Spanish player Alberto Martín detains the record for victories, two, in singles.

== Past finals ==
=== Singles ===
Year	Champion	Runner-up	Score	Ref.
2010	(Spain) Marcel Granollers	(Czech Republic) Jaroslav Pospíšil	1–6, 7–5, 6–0	
2009	(Spain) Daniel Gimeno-Traver	(Italy) Paolo Lorenzi	6–4, 6–0	
2008	(Spain) Alberto Martín (2)	(Germany) Simon Greul	6–7, 6–4, 6–4	
2007	(Spain) Alberto Martín (1)	(Australia) Peter Luczak	6–4, 7–5	
2006	(Italy) Paolo Lorenzi	(Morocco) Younes El Aynaoui	6–4, 7–6	

=== Doubles ===
Year	Champion	Runner-up	Score
2010	(Spain) Guillermo Olaso (Spain) Pere Riba	(Spain) Pablo Andújar (Spain) Gerard Granollers-Pujol	7–6(1), 4–6, [10–5]
2009	(Poland) Tomasz Bednarek (Poland) Mateusz Kowalczyk	(Italy) Flavio Cipolla (Italy) Alessandro Motti	6–1, 6–1
2008	(Czech Republic) Dušan Karol (Austria) Daniel Köllerer	(Spain) Marc Fornell (Spain) Marc López	6–2, 6–2
2007	(Spain) Marcel Granollers (Spain) Santiago Ventura	(Spain) Pablo Andújar (Spain) Daniel Muñoz-de la Nava	6–4, 7–6
2006	(United States) Hugo Armando (Spain) Gabriel Trujillo-Soler	(Spain) Álex López Morón (Spain) Santiago Ventura	6–3, 7–6
