= José Checa Calvo =

Spanish tennis player

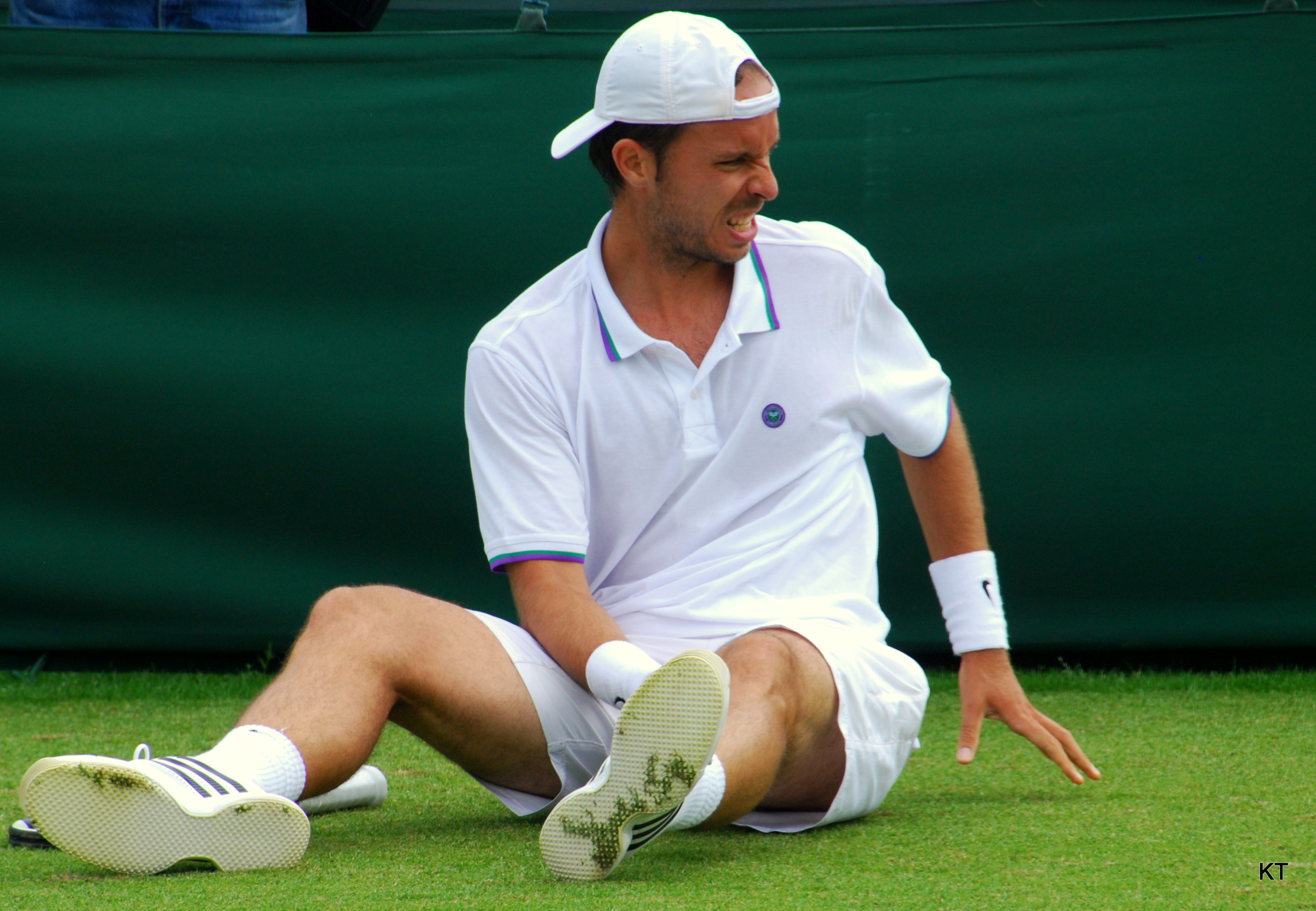
- Country (sports): Spain
- Born: 2 April 1985 (age 41) Las Pedroñeras, Cuenca, Spain
- Height: 6 ft 3 in (191 cm)
- Plays: Right-handed
- Prize money: $172,526

Singles
- Highest ranking: No. 230 (7 April 2014)

Grand Slam singles results
- Australian Open: Q1 (2010, 2014)
- French Open: Q1 (2014)
- Wimbledon: Q1 (2007, 2014)
- US Open: Q1 (2009)

Doubles
- Highest ranking: No. 266 (24 August 2009)

José "Pepe" Checa Calvo (born 2 April 1985) is a Spanish tennis coach and former professional player.

== Career ==
Born in the town of Las Pedroñeras, Checa is a product of the Cuenca Tennis Club, where he trained with his elder sisters. He began competing professionally in 2003.

Checa won 21 ITF singles titles during his career. On the ATP Challenger Tour, Checa was a Montauban semi-finalist in 2006 and beat world number 78 Bjorn Phau at the Tampere Open in 2009. After winning six ITF titles in 2013, he attained a career high singles ranking of 230 in April, 2014. He never made an ATP Tour main draw but featured in several qualifying tournaments including the 2014 Torneo Godó (ATP Tour 500), beating Ante Pavić in the first round.

Forced to retire from professional tennis in 2015 due to injuries, Checa transitioned straight into a career as a tour coach, taking charge of Santiago Giraldo. In 2017 he parted company with Giraldo and became coach of Andrey Kuznetsov. He was the coach of Ilya Ivashka, who rose to 50 in the world under his charge.

== ITF Futures titles ==
=== Singles: (21) ===
Titles by surface
Hard (5)
Clay (14)
Carpet (2)

No.	Date	Tournament	Surface	Opponent	Score
1.	Aug 2005	Spain F21, Santander	Clay	(Spain) José Antonio Sánchez de Luna	7–6^{5}, 4–6, 7–6^{6}
2.	Jun 2006	Spain F17, Maspalomas	Clay	(Serbia and Montenegro) Petar Popović	6–4, 6–2
3.	Jun 2008	Spain F22, Tenerife	Carpet	(Spain) Óscar Burrieza	2–6, 7–6^{0}, 6–4
4.	Oct 2008	Spain F39, Sabadell	Clay	(Spain) Gabriel Trujillo Soler	6–1, 6–3
5.	Nov 2008	Spain F41, Vilafranca	Clay	(Italy) Andrea Arnaboldi	4–6, 6–4, 6–0
6.	Jun 2009	Spain F19, Lanzarote	Hard	(Spain) Roberto Bautista Agut	6–1, 6–4
7.	Aug 2009	Spain F26, Xàtiva	Clay	(Spain) Agustin Boje-Ordonez	6–1, 6–4
8.	Nov 2010	Spain F39, Vilafranca	Clay	(Italy) Marco Viola	2–6, 6–4, 6–1
9.	Jun 2012	Spain F16, Martos	Hard	(Spain) Gerard Granollers	6–4, 6–3
10.	Jul 2012	Italy F17, Sassuolo	Clay	(Spain) Guillermo Olaso	6–2, 6–4
11.	Jul 2012	Italy F19, Fano	Clay	(Poland) Michał Przysiężny	6–4, 6–2
12.	Aug 2012	Spain F24, Vigo	Clay	(Venezuela) Ricardo Rodríguez	6–4, 3–6, 6–2
13.	May 2013	Spain F11, Vic	Clay	(Spain) Gerard Granollers	3–6, 6–4, 6–0
14.	Aug 2013	Spain F25, Béjar	Hard	(Spain) Andrés Artuñedo	4–0, Ret
15.	Sep 2013	Spain F29, Oviedo	Clay	(Spain) Juan Lizariturry	6–4, 6–7^{5}, 6–2
16.	Oct 2013	Spain F33, Sabadell	Clay	(Spain) Roberto Carballés Baena	3–6, 6–0, 6–2
17.	Nov 2013	Spain F39, Tenerife	Carpet	(Spain) Jaime Pulgar-Garcia	6–3, 6–7^{7}, 6–3
18.	Dec 2013	Spain F42, Lanzarote	Hard	(Italy) Andrea Basso	6–4, 6–1
19.	Jun 2014	Egypt F19, Sharm El Sheikh	Clay	(Italy) Riccardo Sinicropi	6–1, 6–3
20.	Apr 2015	Spain F7, Alcalá de Henares	Hard	(Spain) Georgi Rumenov Payakov	3–6, 6–4, 6–3
21.	Aug 2015	Spain F23, Xàtiva	Clay	(France) Johan Tatlot	6–4, 6–1
