= Marcel Granollers =

Spanish tennis player (born 1986)

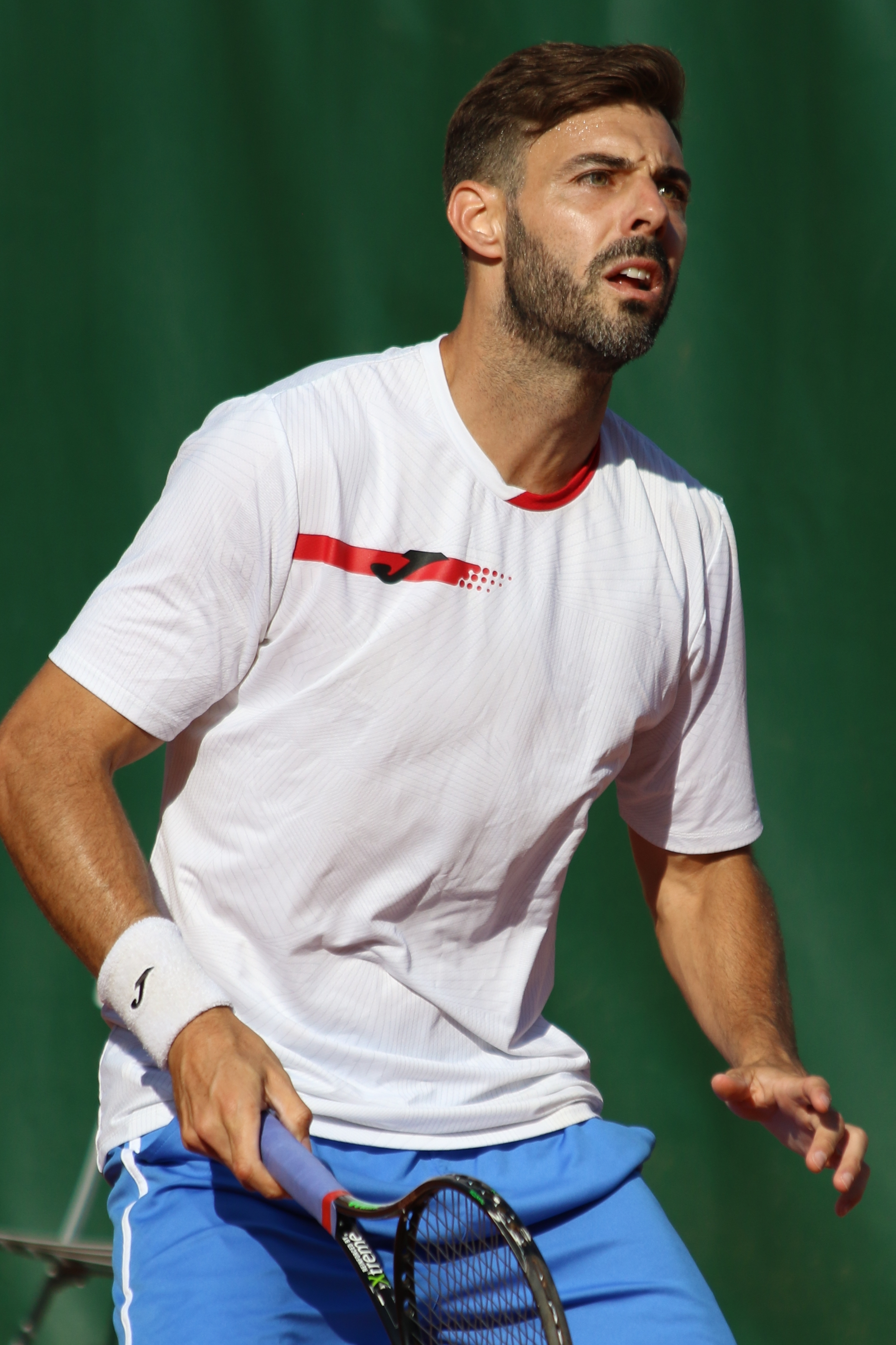
- Granollers at the 2021 French Open
- Country (sports): Spain
- Residence: Barcelona, Spain
- Born: 12 April 1986 (age 40) Barcelona, Spain
- Height: 1.91 m (6 ft 3 in)
- Turned pro: 2003
- Plays: Right-handed (two-handed backhand)
- Coach: Gerard Granollers
- Prize money: US $17,892,843
- Official website: marcelgranollers.com

Singles
- Career record: 202–250
- Career titles: 4
- Highest ranking: No. 19 (23 July 2012)

Grand Slam singles results
- Australian Open: 2R (2009, 2010, 2012, 2013, 2015, 2016)
- French Open: 4R (2012, 2014, 2016)
- Wimbledon: 2R (2009, 2010, 2014, 2015, 2016, 2019)
- US Open: 4R (2013)

Doubles
- Career record: 549–335
- Career titles: 33
- Highest ranking: No. 1 (6 May 2024)
- Current ranking: No. 4 (8 June 2026)

Grand Slam doubles results
- Australian Open: SF (2013, 2016, 2022, 2023, 2026)
- French Open: W (2025, 2026)
- Wimbledon: F (2021, 2023)
- US Open: W (2025)

Other doubles tournaments
- Tour Finals: W (2012)
- Olympic Games: 2R (2024)

Mixed doubles
- Career record: 1–3

Grand Slam mixed doubles results
- Australian Open: 2R (2018)
- French Open: 1R (2018)

Other mixed doubles tournaments
- Olympic Games: 1R (2024)

Team competitions
- Davis Cup: W (2008, 2011, 2019)
- Last updated on: 6 June 2026.

Marcel Granollers Pujol (Catalan pronunciation: [məɾˈsɛl ɣɾənuˈʎes puˈʒɔl]; Spanish: [maɾˈθel ɣɾanoˈʎeɾs puˈʝol]; (Note: In isolation, Granollers is pronounced [ɡɾənuˈʎes] in Catalan and [ɡɾanoˈʎeɾs] in Spanish.) born 12 April 1986) is a Spanish professional tennis player. He has been ranked as the world No. 1 in men's doubles by the Association of Tennis Professionals (ATP), becoming the second Spanish man to achieve the feat (after Emilio Sánchez Vicario in 1989). He has won 33 ATP Tour–level titles in doubles, including three majors at the 2025 and the 2026 French Opens and at the 2025 US Open, all partnering Horacio Zeballos. He also won the 2012 ATP World Tour Finals in doubles with Marc López, and has five runner-up finishes at the majors for a total of eight major finals.

In singles, Granollers has a career-high singles ranking of world No. 19, achieved in July 2012, and has won four ATP Tour titles.

== Personal life ==
Granollers' brother Gerard is also a tennis player, and they have won five Challenger doubles titles together.

== Career ==
=== 2006: Breaking top 200 ===
Granollers made the first round of the Wimbledon tournament in 2006, but lost to Andrei Pavel. In the qualifying rounds, he beat Stéphane Robert, Konstantinos Economidis and Marco Chiudinelli.

=== 2007: Breaking top 150 ===
In 2007, Granollers won the Naples and Rome Challengers for doubles with Flavio Cipolla, and the Maspalomas Challenger for doubles with Marc López. At the 2007 French Open, he made the second round of the men's doubles tournament with Feliciano López before they lost in three close sets to the number 4 seeds Fabrice Santoro and Nenad Zimonjić, who won 7–5, 1–6, 6–4. He lost at the French and Wimbledon Championships both times in the second round of qualifying for the main draws.

=== 2008: Top 60 & first ATP title in singles ===
2008 saw Granollers qualify for the Australian Open Singles Draw, but lost to Evgeny Korolev in straight sets in the first round. He reached the quarterfinals of the 2008 Abierto Mexicano Telcel in Acapulco, Mexico, an International Series Gold tournament, before losing to José Acasuso 7–6, 6–3. On 20 April, he won his first ATP singles title at the U.S. Men's Clay Court Championships, defeating World No. 8 James Blake in the final. He had saved two match points in the semifinals. The previous day, he and Pablo Cuevas lost in the doubles final. Following Rafael Nadal's announcement that he would not play the Davis Cup Final at Argentina on 21–23 November, Spain's Captain Emilio Sánchez announced that Marcel Granollers would replace Nadal. This was Granollers' first Davis Cup appearance, although he did not play any matches.

=== 2009: Three titles & top 25 debut in doubles ===
In 2009, Granollers won three ATP doubles titles at the 2009 Brasil Open, the 2009 Copa Telmex, and the 2009 Kremlin Cup, teaming up with Tommy Robredo, Alberto Martín, and Pablo Cuevas respectively.

=== 2010: First ATP 500 singles final ===
In the first round of the 2010 Australian Open, Granollers pulled off a remarkable comeback when he recovered from 2 sets down against world no.8 and French Open finalist, Robin Söderling. He then lost to Alejandro Falla in the 2nd round.

=== 2011: Top 30 debut & first ATP 500 title in singles ===
Granollers lost in the first round of the Australian Open to eventual champion Novak Djokovic, and he didn't win consecutive matches until the 2011 Miami Masters, where he got to the fourth round.

In July, he beat Stanislas Wawrinka, Mikhail Youzhny, and Fernando Verdasco to win his first title of the year and his second career title at the Swiss Open. In the US Open, he reached the third round of a Grand Slam for the first time in his career, to break into the top 30.

In November, Granollers claimed the title at the Valencia Open by defeating Juan Mónaco in three sets and said, "Winning here has been the biggest achievement in my whole career." He beat four Top 20 players: Alexandr Dolgopolov, Marin Čilić, Gaël Monfils and Juan Martín del Potro en route to the final at the ATP World Tour 500 tournament.

Granollers played for the victorious Spain Davis Cup team in 2011, losing the doubles rubber (with Fernando Verdasco) in the quarterfinal against United States.

=== 2012: Top 20 singles debut, ATP Finals & first Masters doubles titles ===
Marcel Granollers reached the fourth round of a Grand Slam for the first time at French Open, losing to David Ferrer in three straight sets. Granollers lost to Marin Čilić in the final match of Croatia Open on 15 July 2012.

Playing doubles alongside countryman Marc López, he went 3–4 in finals, winning titles at the Italian Open, Swiss Open and the ATP World Tour Finals. Granollers and Lopez were the first Spanish pair to play at the season-ending championships since Sergio Casal and Emilio Sánchez in 1994. They won the title defeating Indian duo Mahesh Bhupathi and Rohan Bopanna in the final.

He also partnered López at the 2012 Summer Olympics.

=== 2013: Success in doubles as World No. 4 & in singles with fourth title ===
Granollers reached a career-high ranking of World No. 4 in doubles on 25 February 2013.

He made it also to the fourth round of the US Open in singles for the first time, where he lost to top-seed Novak Djokovic in straight sets.

=== 2014: US & French Open doubles finalist, Two Masters semifinals ===
In 2014, he had a very consistent doubles performances at the French and US Opens, making the finals at both events with partner Marc López. They qualified for their third consecutive ATP Finals where they lost in the round robin stage for a second year in a row.

=== 2015–18: Second Masters doubles title, Three Masters finals ===
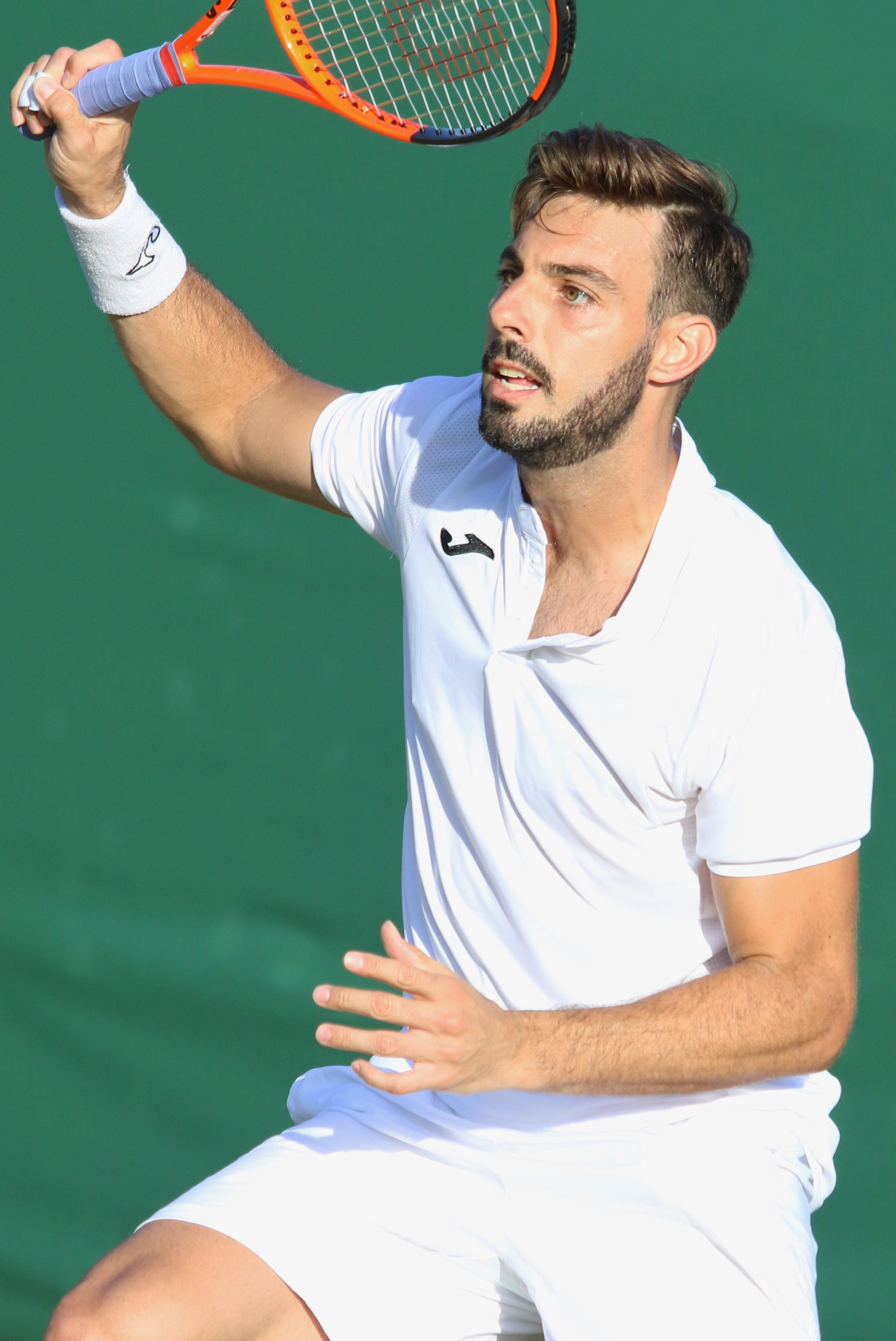
Granollers at the 2017 Wimbledon Championships

Granollers suffered a significant loss in form, with only one tour-level late round appearance: the semifinals in Zagreb Indoors losing to Andreas Seppi. His 2015 year-end singles ranking dropped to No. 84.

He reached the quarterfinals of the 2016 Monte-Carlo Rolex Masters before losing to Gaël Monfils in straight sets, making the main draw as a lucky loser.

He made it to the 4th round of the 2016 French Open after Rafael Nadal withdrew from their 3rd round encounter. He lost out to Dominic Thiem in 4 sets.

In doubles, Granollers reached the finals in both the 2015 and 2017 Masters 1000 in Rome, with Marc López and Ivan Dodig respectively. He also reached the final of the 2017 Rolex Paris Masters with Dodig. In 2018, he won the Paris Masters, partnering Rajeev Ram.

=== 2019–21: New partnership: US Open & Wimbledon finals, four Masters titles, back to top 5 ===
With his new partner Horacio Zeballos, Granollers won 6 titles starting in August 2019, and also made his first Grand Slam doubles final at the 2019 US Open, losing to the World No. 1 and top seeded pair Farah/Cabal. The pair won three Masters 1000: the 2019 Canadian Open, the 2020 Italian Open and the 2021 Mutua Madrid Open. As a result, he reentered the top 10 in doubles at World No. 9 on 9 September 2019 and No. 7 on 21 September 2020. He also reentered the top 5 on 12 July 2021 following the final at the 2021 Wimbledon Championships where they lost to World No. 1 and top seeds Mektic/Pavic.

In August 2021, they reached a second Masters 1000 final for 2021 and fourth overall at the 2021 Western & Southern Open in Cincinnati defeating Arévalo/Fognini. They defeated Austin Krajicek and Steve Johnson in the final to win their fourth Masters.

=== 2022: Two Grand Slam semifinals, five Masters quarterfinals, third straight ATP Finals ===
Granollers and Zebalos qualified for their third consecutive ATP Finals, having advanced to the semifinals of the year-end championships in 2020 and 2021. It was Granollers seventh participation.

=== 2023: 25th title, fourth straight ATP Finals & second final ===
At the 2023 Australian Open Granollers and Zeballos reached back-to-back semifinals.

At the 2023 French Open they upset top seeds Wesley Koolhof and Neal Skupski to reach also back-to-back semifinals. They lost to eventual champions Ivan Dodig and Austin Krajicek.

The pair won their first Masters of the season and fifth overall as a team at the 2023 Rolex Shanghai Masters. As a result, he returned to the top 10 on 16 October 2023.

Granollers and Zebalos qualified for their fourth consecutive ATP Finals. It was Granoller's eight participation. Granollers with Zeballos reached his second ATP Finals championship match but lost to Joe Salisbury and Rajeev Ram.

=== 2024–25: 500th win, World No. 1, French Open champion ===
At the 2024 BNP Paribas Open in Indian Wells, Granollers and Zeballos reached the final, saving a match point. At the 2024 Miami Open where he reached the semifinals, he recorded his 500th doubles career win en route.

At the 2024 Monte-Carlo Masters Granollers and Zeballos reached their third Masters semifinal in a row. A week later, on 22 April 2024, he reached a new career-high doubles ranking of world No. 3. At the next Masters 1000, the 2024 Mutua Madrid Open, with Zeballos, he reached the quarterfinals and both players moved into a new career-high ranking of No. 2. With reaching their fourth Masters semifinal of the season, with a win over Hugo Nys and Jan Zielinski, they became joint World No. 1 on 6 May 2024. They reached again a Masters final at the Italian Open, and fourth final for the season, defeating the newly formed pair of Alexander Bublik and Ben Shelton. They won their sixth Masters title as a team defeating Marcelo Arévalo and Mate Pavić.

At the 2024 French Open, they reached their third consecutive semifinal at this Major defeating 15th seeds Hugo Nys and Jan Zieliński, and then Tomas Machac and Zhang Zhizhen.

He won his ninth Masters title at the 2024 National Bank Open, second for the year and at this tournament, and tenth as a team with Zeballos.

Granollers and Zeballos reached the 2025 French Open final, their fourth major final together, defeating Hugo Nys and Edouard Roger-Vasselin. They defeated Joe Salisbury and Neal Skupski in the final, 6–0, 6–7^{(5–7)}, 7–5 to win title. It was both players' first Grand Slam men's doubles title, following five previous runner-up finishes for Granollers and three for Zeballos.

== Playing style ==
Granollers' good serve and net skills account for his excellent doubles record. His comparatively technically weak groundstrokes are underpowered with low takebacks on both wings but they provide a decent defensive framework. He is also known for his heavy grunting, so much as to result in ridicule and accusations of gamesmanship due to its loud volume and questionable timing during matches.

== Significant finals ==
=== Grand Slam finals ===
==== Doubles: 8 (3 titles, 5 runner-ups) ====
Result	Year	Championship	Surface	Partner	Opponents	Score
Loss	2014	French Open	Clay	(Spain) Marc López	(France) Julien Benneteau (France) Édouard Roger-Vasselin	3–6, 6–7^{(1–7)}
Loss	2014	US Open	Hard	(Spain) Marc López	(United States) Bob Bryan (United States) Mike Bryan	3–6, 4–6
Loss	2019	US Open	Hard	(Argentina) Horacio Zeballos	(Colombia) Juan Sebastián Cabal (Colombia) Robert Farah	4–6, 5–7
Loss	2021	Wimbledon	Grass	(Argentina) Horacio Zeballos	(Croatia) Nikola Mektić (Croatia) Mate Pavić	4–6, 6–7^{(5–7)}, 6–2, 5–7
Loss	2023	Wimbledon	Grass	(Argentina) Horacio Zeballos	(Netherlands) Wesley Koolhof (United Kingdom) Neal Skupski	4–6, 4–6
Win	2025	French Open	Clay	(Argentina) Horacio Zeballos	(United Kingdom) Joe Salisbury (United Kingdom) Neal Skupski	6–0, 6–7^{(5–7)}, 7–5
Win	2025	US Open	Hard	(Argentina) Horacio Zeballos	(United Kingdom) Joe Salisbury (United Kingdom) Neal Skupski	3–6, 7–6^{(7–5)}, 7–5
Win	2026	French Open (2)	Clay	(Argentina) Horacio Zeballos	(Finland) Harri Heliövaara (United Kingdom) Henry Patten	6–4, 6–2

=== Year-end championships finals ===
==== Doubles: 2 (1 title, 1 runner-up) ====
Result	Year	Championship	Surface	Partner	Opponents	Score
Win	2012	ATP World Tour Finals, London	Hard (i)	(Spain) Marc López	(India) Mahesh Bhupathi (India) Rohan Bopanna	7–5, 3–6, [10–3]
Loss	2023	ATP Finals, Turin	Hard (i)	(Argentina) Horacio Zeballos	(United States) Rajeev Ram (United Kingdom) Joe Salisbury	3–6, 4–6

=== Masters 1000 finals ===
==== Doubles: 17 (10 titles, 7 runner-ups) ====
Result	Year	Tournament	Surface	Partner	Opponents	Score
Loss	2009	Paris Masters	Hard (i)	(Spain) Tommy Robredo	(Canada) Daniel Nestor (Serbia) Nenad Zimonjić	3–6, 4–6
Win	2012	Italian Open	Clay	(Spain) Marc López	(Poland) Łukasz Kubot (Serbia) Janko Tipsarević	6–3, 6–2
Loss	2012	Canadian Open	Hard	(Spain) Marc López	(United States) Bob Bryan (United States) Mike Bryan	1–6, 6–4, [10–12]
Loss	2013	Cincinnati Masters	Hard	(Spain) Marc López	(United States) Bob Bryan (United States) Mike Bryan	4–6, 6–4, [4–10]
Loss	2015	Italian Open	Clay	(Spain) Marc López	(Uruguay) Pablo Cuevas (Spain) David Marrero	4–6, 5–7
Loss	2017	Italian Open	Clay	(Croatia) Ivan Dodig	(France) Pierre-Hugues Herbert (France) Nicolas Mahut	6–4, 4–6, [3–10]
Loss	2017	Paris Masters	Hard (i)	(Croatia) Ivan Dodig	(Poland) Łukasz Kubot (Brazil) Marcelo Melo	6–7^{(3–7)}, 6–3, [6–10]
Win	2018	Paris Masters	Hard (i)	(United States) Rajeev Ram	(Netherlands) Jean-Julien Rojer (Romania) Horia Tecău	6–4, 6–4
Win	2019	Canadian Open	Hard	(Argentina) Horacio Zeballos	(Netherlands) Robin Haase (Netherlands) Wesley Koolhof	7–5, 7–5
Win	2020	Italian Open (2)	Clay	(Argentina) Horacio Zeballos	(France) Jérémy Chardy (France) Fabrice Martin	6–4, 5–7, [10–8]
Win	2021	Madrid Open	Clay	(Argentina) Horacio Zeballos	(Croatia) Nikola Mektić (Croatia) Mate Pavić	1–6, 6–3, [10–8]
Win	2021	Cincinnati Masters	Hard	(Argentina) Horacio Zeballos	(United States) Steve Johnson (United States) Austin Krajicek	7–6^{(7–5)}, 7–6^{(7–5)}
Win	2023	Shanghai Masters	Hard	(Argentina) Horacio Zeballos	(India) Rohan Bopanna (Australia) Matthew Ebden	5–7, 6–2, [10–7]
Loss	2024	Indian Wells Masters	Hard	(Argentina) Horacio Zeballos	(Netherlands) Wesley Koolhof (Croatia) Nikola Mektić	6–7^{(2–7)}, 6–7^{(4–7)}
Win	2024	Italian Open (3)	Clay	(Argentina) Horacio Zeballos	(El Salvador) Marcelo Arévalo (Croatia) Mate Pavić	6–2, 6–2
Win	2024	Canadian Open (2)	Hard	(Argentina) Horacio Zeballos	(United States) Rajeev Ram (United Kingdom) Joe Salisbury	6–2, 7–6^{(7–4)}
Win	2025	Madrid Open (2)	Clay	(Argentina) Horacio Zeballos	(El Salvador) Marcelo Arévalo (Croatia) Mate Pavić	6–4, 6–4

== ATP career finals ==
=== Singles: 7 (4 titles, 3 runner-ups) ===
Legend Grand Slam tournaments (0–0) ATP World Tour Finals (0–0) ATP World Tour Masters 1000 (0–0) ATP World Tour 500 Series (1–1) ATP World Tour 250 Series (3–2)	Finals by surface Hard (1–1) Clay (3–2) Grass (0–0)	Finals by setting Outdoor (3–2) Indoor (1–1)

Result	W–L	Date	Tournament	Tier	Surface	Opponent	Score
Win	1–0	Apr 2008	U.S. Men's Clay Court Championships, United States	250 Series	Clay	(United States) James Blake	6–4, 1–6, 7–5
Loss	1–1	Nov 2010	Valencia Open, Spain	500 Series	Hard (i)	(Spain) David Ferrer	5–7, 3–6
Win	2–1	Jul 2011	Swiss Open, Switzerland	250 Series	Clay	(Spain) Fernando Verdasco	6–4, 3–6, 6–3
Win	3–1	Nov 2011	Valencia Open, Spain	500 Series	Hard (i)	(Argentina) Juan Mónaco	6–2, 4–6, 7–6^{(7–3)}
Loss	3–2	Jul 2012	Croatia Open, Croatia	250 Series	Clay	(Croatia) Marin Čilić	4–6, 2–6
Win	4–2	Aug 2013	Austrian Open Kitzbühel, Austria	250 Series	Clay	(Argentina) Juan Mónaco	0–6, 7–6^{(7–3)}, 6–4
Loss	4–3	Apr 2014	Grand Prix Hassan II, Morocco	250 Series	Clay	(Spain) Guillermo García López	7–5, 4–6, 3–6

=== Doubles: 63 (33 titles, 30 runner-ups) ===
Legend Grand Slam tournaments (3–5) ATP World Tour Finals (1–1) ATP World Tour Masters 1000 (10–7) ATP World Tour 500 Series (7–6) ATP World Tour 250 Series (12–11)	Finals by surface Hard (15–12) Clay (16–15) Grass (2–2)	Finals by setting Outdoor (26–24) Indoor (7–6)

Result	W–L	Date	Tournament	Tier	Surface	Partner	Opponents	Score
Loss	0–1	Apr 2008	U.S. Men's Clay Court Championships, United States	Intl Series	Clay	(Uruguay) Pablo Cuevas	(Latvia) Ernests Gulbis (Germany) Rainer Schüttler	5–7, 6–7^{(3–7)}
Win	1–1	Feb 2009	Brasil Open, Brazil	250 Series	Clay	(Spain) Tommy Robredo	(Argentina) Lucas Arnold Ker (Argentina) Juan Mónaco	6–4, 7–5
Win	2–1	Feb 2009	Buenos Aires Open, Argentina	250 Series	Clay	(Spain) Alberto Martín	(Spain) Nicolás Almagro (Spain) Santiago Ventura	6–3, 5–7, [10–8]
Win	3–1	Oct 2009	Kremlin Cup, Russia	250 Series	Hard (i)	(Uruguay) Pablo Cuevas	(Czech Republic) František Čermák (Slovakia) Michal Mertiňák	4–6, 7–5, [10–8]
Loss	3–2	Nov 2009	Valencia Open, Spain	500 Series	Hard (i)	(Spain) Tommy Robredo	(Czech Republic) František Čermák (Slovakia) Michal Mertiňák	4–6, 3–6
Loss	3–3	Nov 2009	Paris Masters, France	Masters 1000	Hard (i)	(Spain) Tommy Robredo	(Canada) Daniel Nestor (Serbia) Nenad Zimonjić	3–6, 4–6
Win	4–3	Jan 2010	Chennai Open, India	250 Series	Hard	(Spain) Santiago Ventura	(Chinese Taipei) Lu Yen-hsun (Serbia) Janko Tipsarević	7–5, 6–2
Win	5–3	Feb 2010	Brasil Open, Brazil (2)	250 Series	Clay	(Uruguay) Pablo Cuevas	(Poland) Łukasz Kubot (Austria) Oliver Marach	7–5, 6–4
Loss	5–4	May 2010	Estoril Open, Portugal	250 Series	Clay	(Uruguay) Pablo Cuevas	(Spain) Marc López (Spain) David Marrero	7–6^{(7–1)}, 4–6, [4–10]
Loss	5–5	Sep 2010	Romanian Open, Romania	250 Series	Clay	(Spain) Santiago Ventura	(Argentina) Juan Ignacio Chela (Poland) Łukasz Kubot	2–6, 7–5, [11–13]
Win	6–5	Jan 2011	Auckland Open, New Zealand	250 Series	Hard	(Spain) Tommy Robredo	(Sweden) Johan Brunström (Australia) Stephen Huss	6–4, 7–6^{(8–6)}
Loss	6–6	Feb 2011	Zagreb Indoors, Croatia	250 Series	Hard (i)	(Spain) Marc López	(Belgium) Dick Norman (Romania) Horia Tecău	3–6, 4–6
Loss	6–7	Jul 2011	Stuttgart Open, Germany	250 Series	Clay	(Spain) Marc López	(Austria) Jürgen Melzer (Germany) Philipp Petzschner	3–6, 4–6
Loss	6–8	Mar 2012	Mexican Open, Mexico	500 Series	Clay	(Spain) Marc López	(Spain) David Marrero (Spain) Fernando Verdasco	3–6, 4–6
Loss	6–9	Mar 2012	Barcelona Open, Spain	500 Series	Clay	(Spain) Marc López	(Poland) Mariusz Fyrstenberg (Poland) Marcin Matkowski	6–2, 6–7^{(7–9)}, [8–10]
Win	7–9	May 2012	Italian Open, Italy	Masters 1000	Clay	(Spain) Marc López	(Poland) Łukasz Kubot (Serbia) Janko Tipsarević	6–3, 6–2
Loss	7–10	Jul 2012	Croatia Open, Croatia	250 Series	Clay	(Spain) Marc López	(Spain) David Marrero (Spain) Fernando Verdasco	3–6, 6–7^{(4–7)}
Win	8–10	Jul 2012	Swiss Open, Switzerland	250 Series	Clay	(Spain) Marc López	(Colombia) Robert Farah (Colombia) Santiago Giraldo	6–4, 7–6^{(11–9)}
Loss	8–11	Aug 2012	Canadian Open, Canada	Masters 1000	Hard	(Spain) Marc López	(United States) Bob Bryan (United States) Mike Bryan	1–6, 6–4, [10–12]
Win	9–11	Nov 2012	ATP World Tour Finals, United Kingdom	Tour Finals	Hard (i)	(Spain) Marc López	(India) Mahesh Bhupathi (India) Rohan Bopanna	7–5, 3–6, [10–3]
Loss	9–12	Aug 2013	Cincinnati Masters, United States	Masters 1000	Hard	(Spain) Marc López	(United States) Bob Bryan (United States) Mike Bryan	4–6, 6–4, [4–10]
Win	10–12	Feb 2014	Buenos Aires Open, Argentina (2)	250 Series	Clay	(Spain) Marc López	(Uruguay) Pablo Cuevas (Argentina) Horacio Zeballos	7–5, 6–4
Loss	10–13	Jun 2014	French Open, France	Grand Slam	Clay	(Spain) Marc López	(France) Julien Benneteau (France) Édouard Roger-Vasselin	3–6, 6–7^{(1–7)}
Loss	10–14	Sep 2014	US Open, United States	Grand Slam	Hard	(Spain) Marc López	(United States) Bob Bryan (United States) Mike Bryan	3–6, 4–6
Loss	10–15	May 2015	Italian Open, Italy (2)	Masters 1000	Clay	(Spain) Marc López	(Uruguay) Pablo Cuevas (Spain) David Marrero	4–6, 5–7
Loss	10–16	Apr 2016	Barcelona Open, Spain	500 Series	Clay	(Uruguay) Pablo Cuevas	(United States) Bob Bryan (United States) Mike Bryan	5–7, 5–7
Win	11–16	Jul 2016	Swedish Open, Sweden	250 Series	Clay	(Spain) David Marrero	(New Zealand) Marcus Daniell (Brazil) Marcelo Demoliner	6–2, 6–3
Win	12–16	Oct 2016	Japan Open, Japan	500 Series	Hard	(Poland) Marcin Matkowski	(South Africa) Raven Klaasen (United States) Rajeev Ram	6–2, 7–6^{(7–4)}
Win	13–16	Oct 2016	Swiss Indoors, Switzerland	500 Series	Hard (i)	(United States) Jack Sock	(Sweden) Robert Lindstedt (New Zealand) Michael Venus	6–3, 6–4
Win	14–16	Feb 2017	Rotterdam Open, Netherlands	500 Series	Hard (i)	(Croatia) Ivan Dodig	(Netherlands) Wesley Koolhof (Netherlands) Matwé Middelkoop	7–6^{(7–5)}, 6–3
Loss	14–17	Apr 2017	Grand Prix Hassan II, Morocco	250 Series	Clay	(Spain) Marc López	(United Kingdom) Dominic Inglot (Croatia) Mate Pavić	4–6, 6–2, [9–11]
Loss	14–18	May 2017	Italian Open, Italy (3)	Masters 1000	Clay	(Croatia) Ivan Dodig	(France) Pierre-Hugues Herbert (France) Nicolas Mahut	6–4, 4–6, [3–10]
Win	15–18	Oct 2017	Swiss Indoors, Switzerland (2)	500 Series	Hard (i)	(Croatia) Ivan Dodig	(France) Fabrice Martin (France) Édouard Roger-Vasselin	7–5, 7–6^{(8–6)}
Loss	15–19	Nov 2017	Paris Masters, France (2)	Masters 1000	Hard (i)	(Croatia) Ivan Dodig	(Poland) Łukasz Kubot (Brazil) Marcelo Melo	6–7^{(3–7)}, 6–3, [6–10]
Win	16–19	Nov 2018	Paris Masters, France	Masters 1000	Hard (i)	(United States) Rajeev Ram	(Netherlands) Jean-Julien Rojer (Romania) Horia Tecău	6–4, 6–4
Win	17–19	Jul 2019	Hall of Fame Open, United States	250 Series	Grass	(Ukraine) Sergiy Stakhovsky	(El Salvador) Marcelo Arévalo (Mexico) Miguel Ángel Reyes-Varela	6–7^{(10–12)}, 6–4, [13–11]
Win	18–19	Aug 2019	Canadian Open, Canada	Masters 1000	Hard	(Argentina) Horacio Zeballos	(Netherlands) Robin Haase (Netherlands) Wesley Koolhof	7–5, 7–5
Loss	18–20	Sep 2019	US Open, United States	Grand Slam	Hard	(Argentina) Horacio Zeballos	(Colombia) Juan Sebastián Cabal (Colombia) Robert Farah	4–6, 5–7
Win	19–20	Feb 2020	Argentina Open, Argentina (3)	250 Series	Clay	(Argentina) Horacio Zeballos	(Argentina) Guillermo Durán (Argentina) Juan Ignacio Londero	6–4, 5–7, [18–16]
Win	20–20	Feb 2020	Rio Open, Brazil	500 Series	Clay	(Argentina) Horacio Zeballos	(Italy) Salvatore Caruso (Italy) Federico Gaio	6–4, 5–7, [10–7]
Loss	20–21	Sep 2020	Austrian Open Kitzbühel, Austria	250 Series	Clay	(Argentina) Horacio Zeballos	(United States) Austin Krajicek (Croatia) Franko Škugor	6–7^{(5–7)}, 5–7
Win	21–21	Sep 2020	Italian Open, Italy (2)	Masters 1000	Clay	(Argentina) Horacio Zeballos	(France) Jérémy Chardy (France) Fabrice Martin	6–4, 5–7, [10–8]
Loss	21–22	Mar 2021	Mexican Open, Mexico	500 Series	Hard	(Argentina) Horacio Zeballos	(United Kingdom) Ken Skupski (United Kingdom) Neal Skupski	6–7^{(3–7)}, 4–6
Win	22–22	May 2021	Madrid Open, Spain	Masters 1000	Clay	(Argentina) Horacio Zeballos	(Croatia) Nikola Mektić (Croatia) Mate Pavić	1–6, 6–3, [10–8]
Loss	22–23	Jul 2021	Wimbledon Championships, United Kingdom	Grand Slam	Grass	(Argentina) Horacio Zeballos	(Croatia) Nikola Mektić (Croatia) Mate Pavić	4–6, 6–7^{(5–7)}, 6–2, 5–7
Win	23–23	Aug 2021	Cincinnati Masters, United States	Masters 1000	Hard	(Argentina) Horacio Zeballos	(United States) Steve Johnson (United States) Austin Krajicek	7–6^{(7–5)}, 7–6^{(7–5)}
Win	24–23	Jun 2022	Halle Open, Germany	500 Series	Grass	(Argentina) Horacio Zeballos	(Germany) Tim Pütz (New Zealand) Michael Venus	6–4, 6–7^{(5–7)}, [14–12]
Loss	24–24	May 2023	Geneva Open, Switzerland	250 Series	Clay	(Argentina) Horacio Zeballos	(United Kingdom) Jamie Murray (New Zealand) Michael Venus	6–7^{(6–8)}, 6–7 ^{(3–7)}
Loss	24–25	Jul 2023	Wimbledon Championships, United Kingdom	Grand Slam	Grass	(Argentina) Horacio Zeballos	(Netherlands) Wesley Koolhof (United Kingdom) Neal Skupski	4–6, 4–6
Win	25–25	Oct 2023	Shanghai Masters, China	Masters 1000	Hard	(Argentina) Horacio Zeballos	(India) Rohan Bopanna (Australia) Matthew Ebden	5–7, 6–2, [10–7]
Loss	25–26	Nov 2023	ATP Finals, Italy	Tour Finals	Hard (i)	(Argentina) Horacio Zeballos	(United States) Rajeev Ram (United Kingdom) Joe Salisbury	3–6, 4–6
Loss	25–27	Jan 2024	Auckland Open, New Zealand	250 Series	Hard	(Argentina) Horacio Zeballos	(Netherlands) Wesley Koolhof (Croatia) Nikola Mektić	3–6, 7–6^{(7–5)}, [7–10]
Loss	25–28	Feb 2024	Argentina Open, Argentina	250 Series	Clay	(Argentina) Horacio Zeballos	(Italy) Simone Bolelli (Italy) Andrea Vavassori	2–6, 6–7^{(6–8)}
Loss	25–29	Mar 2024	Indian Wells Masters, United States	Masters 1000	Hard	(Argentina) Horacio Zeballos	(Netherlands) Wesley Koolhof (Croatia) Nikola Mektić	6–7^{(2–7)}, 6–7^{(4–7)}
Win	26–29	May 2024	Italian Open, Italy (3)	Masters 1000	Clay	(Argentina) Horacio Zeballos	(El Salvador) Marcelo Arévalo (Croatia) Mate Pavić	6–2, 6–2
Win	27–29	Aug 2024	Canadian Open, Canada (2)	Masters 1000	Hard	(Argentina) Horacio Zeballos	(United States) Rajeev Ram (United Kingdom) Joe Salisbury	6–2, 7–6^{(7–4)}
Win	28–29	Apr 2025	Țiriac Open, Romania	250 Series	Clay	(Argentina) Horacio Zeballos	(Germany) Jakob Schnaitter (Germany) Mark Wallner	7–6^{(7–3)}, 6–4
Win	29–29	May 2025	Madrid Open, Spain (2)	Masters 1000	Clay	(Argentina) Horacio Zeballos	(El Salvador) Marcelo Arévalo (Croatia) Mate Pavić	6–4, 6–4
Win	30–29	Jun 2025	French Open, France	Grand Slam	Clay	(Argentina) Horacio Zeballos	(United Kingdom) Joe Salisbury (United Kingdom) Neal Skupski	6–0, 6–7^{(5–7)}, 7–5
Win	31–29	Sep 2025	US Open, United States	Grand Slam	Hard	(Argentina) Horacio Zeballos	(United Kingdom) Joe Salisbury (United Kingdom) Neal Skupski	3–6, 7–6^{(7–5)}, 7–5
Win	32–29	Oct 2025	Swiss Indoors, Switzerland (3)	500 Series	Hard (i)	(Argentina) Horacio Zeballos	(Czech Republic) Adam Pavlásek (Poland) Jan Zieliński	6–2, 7–5
Loss	32–30	Feb 2026	Dallas Open, United States	500 Series	Hard (i)	(Argentina) Horacio Zeballos	(France) Théo Arribagé (France) Albano Olivetti	3–6, 6–7^{(4–7)}
Win	33–30	Jun 2026	French Open, France (2)	Grand Slam	Clay	(Argentina) Horacio Zeballos	(Finland) Harri Heliövaara (United Kingdom) Henry Patten	6–4, 6–2

== Challenger and Futures finals ==
=== Singles: 27 (13–14) ===
Legend (singles) ATP Challenger Tour (7–10) ITF Futures Tour (6–4)	Titles by surface Hard (9–5) Clay (4–9) Grass (0–0) Carpet (0–0)

Result	W–L	Date	Tournament	Tier	Surface	Opponent	Score
Win	1–0	Oct 2003	Spain F25, Martos	Futures	Hard	(Spain) Esteban Carril	6–2, 6–3
Win	2–0	May 2004	Spain F5, Reus	Futures	Clay	(Spain) Javier Genaro-Martínez	6–3, 6–3
Win	3–0	Oct 2004	Spain F25, Martos	Futures	Hard	(Germany) Tony Holzinger	6–3, 6–4
Loss	3–1	Feb 2005	Portugal F1, Faro	Futures	Hard	(Portugal) Fred Gil	2–6, 7–6^{(7–3)}, 3–6
Loss	3–2	Mar 2005	Portugal F2, Lagos	Futures	Hard	(France) David Guez	2–6, 4–6
Loss	3–3	Mar 2005	Portugal F3, Lagos	Futures	Hard	(Portugal) Fred Gil	1–6, 3–6
Loss	3–4	May 2005	Spain F7, Lleida	Futures	Clay	(Spain) Daniel Gimeno Traver	4–6, 1–6
Win	4–4	Jun 2005	Spain F12, La Palma	Futures	Hard	(Spain) Carlos Rexach-Itoiz	7–5, 6–7^{(5–7)}, 6–3
Win	5–4	Oct 2005	Spain F26, Martos	Futures	Hard	(Netherlands) Steven Korteling	6–2, 6–3
Win	6–4	Mar 2006	Portugal F1, Faro	Futures	Hard	(Germany) Tony Holzinger	6–1, 7–5
Loss	6–5	May 2006	Ostrava, Czech Republic	Challenger	Clay	(Czech Republic) Ivo Minář	1–6, 0–6
Loss	6–6	Jun 2006	Turin, Italy	Challenger	Clay	(Italy) Flavio Cipolla	3–6, 3–6
Win	7–6	Oct 2006	Barcelona, Spain	Challenger	Clay	(Spain) Óscar Hernández Pérez	6–4, 6–1
Loss	7–7	Sep 2007	Bucharest, Romania	Challenger	Clay	(Romania) Victor Hănescu	6–7^{(6–8)}, 1–6
Loss	7–8	Oct 2007	Belo Horizonte, Brazil	Challenger	Clay	(France) Nicolas Devilder	2–6, 7–6^{(7–4)}, 6–7^{(6–8)}
Loss	7–9	Nov 2007	Montevideo, Uruguay	Challenger	Clay	(Spain) Santiago Ventura	6–4, 0–6, 4–6
Win	8–9	Mar 2008	Tanger, Morocco	Challenger	Clay	(Spain) Daniel Gimeno Traver	6–4, 6–4
Loss	8–10	Mar 2008	Saint Brieuc, France	Challenger	Clay (i)	(Belgium) Christophe Rochus	2–6, 6–4, 1–6
Loss	8–11	Dec 2009	Khanty-Mansiysk, Russia	Challenger	Hard (i)	(Russia) Konstantin Kravchuk	6–1, 3–6, 2–6
Loss	8–12	Mar 2010	Rabat, Morocco	Challenger	Clay	(Spain) Rubén Ramírez Hidalgo	4–6, 4–6
Loss	8–13	Sep 2010	Todi, Italy	Challenger	Clay	(Argentina) Carlos Berlocq	4–6, 3–6
Win	9–13	Oct 2010	Tarragona, Spain	Challenger	Clay	(Czech Republic) Jaroslav Pospíšil	1–6, 7–5, 6–0
Win	10–13	Mar 2016	Irving, USA	Challenger	Hard	(United Kingdom) Aljaž Bedene	6–1, 6–1
Win	11–13	Jan 2018	Bangkok, Thailand	Challenger	Hard	(Germany) Mats Moraing	4–6, 6–3, 7–5
Win	12–13	Jan 2018	Bangkok, Thailand	Challenger	Hard	(Spain) Enrique López Pérez	4–6, 6–2, 6–0
Loss	12–14	Sep 2018	Tiburon, USA	Challenger	Hard	(United States) Michael Mmoh	3–6, 5–7
Win	13–14	Jan 2019	Danang, Vietnam	Challenger	Hard	(Italy) Matteo Viola	6–2, 6–0

=== Doubles: 39 (31 titles, 8 runners-up) ===
Legend (doubles) ATP Challenger Tour (22–7) ITF Futures Tour (9–1)	Titles by surface Hard (13–1) Clay (17–7) Grass (1–0) Carpet (0–0)

Result	W–L	Date	Tournament	Tier	Surface	Partner	Opponents	Score
Loss	0–1	Feb 2004	Spain F2, Algezares	Futures	Clay	(Spain) Marc Fornell Mestres	(Spain) Nicolás Almagro (Spain) Roberto Menéndez-Ferré	5–7, 4–6
Win	1–1	Aug 2004	Spain F19, Irun	Futures	Clay	(Ivory Coast) Valentin Sanon	(Spain) Ivan Esquerdo-Andreu (Spain) Marc Fornell Mestres	6–2, 6–0
Win	2–1	Aug 2004	Spain F20, Santander	Futures	Clay	(Ivory Coast) Valentin Sanon	(Spain) David Marrero (Spain) Pablo Santos González	w/o
Win	3–1	Sep 2004	Spain F24, Madrid	Futures	Hard	(Togo) Komlavi Loglo	(Austria) Marco Mirnegg (Austria) Marko Neunteibl	6–4, 6–0
Win	4–1	Oct 2004	Spain F26, El Ejido	Futures	Hard	(Romania) Adrian Cruciat	(Spain) Marc Rocafort Dolz (Spain) Javier Ruiz González	6–3, 6–3
Win	5–1	Feb 2005	Spain F3, Totana	Futures	Hard	(Spain) Marc Fornell Mestres	(Poland) Filip Urban (Germany) Marius Zay	6–2, 6–3
Win	6–1	Aug 2005	Segovia, Spain	Challenger	Hard	(Spain) Álex López Morón	(Italy) Daniele Bracciali (Italy) Uros Vico	6–4, 6–2
Win	7–1	Oct 2005	Spain F27, El Ejido	Futures	Hard	(Spain) David Marrero	(Spain) Marcos Jiménez-Letrado (Spain) Juan-Miguel Such-Pérez	6–4, 6–4
Win	8–1	Nov 2005	Spain F32, Gran Canaria	Futures	Hard	(Spain) David Marrero	(Spain) Antonio Baldellou-Esteva (Aruba) José Luis Muguruza	6–1, 6–3
Win	9–1	Mar 2006	Portugal F1, Faro	Futures	Hard	(Italy) Alessandro da Col	(Netherlands) Bart Beks (Netherlands) Matwé Middelkoop	6–4, 2–6, 6–2
Win	10–1	Mar 2006	Portugal F2, Lagos	Futures	Hard	(Portugal) Rui Machado	(Germany) Sebastian Fitz (Croatia) Franko Škugor	6–1, 6–1
Win	11–1	Jun 2006	Turin, Italy	Challenger	Clay	(Spain) Marc López	(Italy) Leonardo Azzaro (Italy) Flavio Cipolla	6–4, 6–3
Win	12–1	Jul 2006	Mantova, Italy	Challenger	Clay	(Spain) Pablo Andújar	(Italy) Alessandro Motti (Spain) Daniel Muñoz de la Nava	6–3, 5–7, [10–7]
Win	13–1	Aug 2006	Vigo, Spain	Challenger	Clay	(Spain) Pablo Andújar	(France) Augustin Gensse (Argentina) Horacio Zeballos	7–6^{(7–4)}, 6–1
Win	14–1	Sep 2006	Seville, Spain	Challenger	Clay	(Spain) Pablo Andújar	(United States) Hugo Armando (Spain) Carles Poch-Gradin	4–6, 6–3, [10–8]
Win	15–1	Oct 2006	Bratislava, Slovakia	Challenger	Clay	(Italy) Flavio Cipolla	(Spain) David Marrero (Spain) Pablo Santos González	7–6^{(7–2)}, 6–4
Loss	15–2	Oct 2006	Barcelona, Spain	Challenger	Clay	(Spain) Pablo Andújar	(Germany) Tomas Behrend (Italy) Flavio Cipolla	3–6, 2–6
Loss	15–3	Nov 2006	Aracaju, Brazil	Challenger	Clay	(Germany) Tomas Behrend	(Argentina) Máximo González (Argentina) Sergio Roitman	6–7^{(6–8)}, 6–3, [6–10]
Loss	15–4	Nov 2006	Buenos Aires, Argentina	Challenger	Clay	(Germany) Tomas Behrend	(Brazil) André Ghem (Brazil) Flávio Saretta	1–6, 4–6
Win	16–4	Apr 2007	Naples, Italy	Challenger	Clay	(Italy) Flavio Cipolla	(Italy) Marco Crugnola (Italy) Alessio di Mauro	6–4, 6–2
Win	17–4	May 2007	Rome, Italy	Challenger	Clay	(Italy) Flavio Cipolla	(Italy) Stefano Galvani (Italy) Manuel Jorquera	3–6, 6–1, [11–9]
Win	18–4	May 2007	Maspalomas, Spain	Challenger	Clay	(Spain) Marc López	(Italy) Leonardo Azzaro (Austria) Rainer Eitzinger	3–6, 6–1, [10–3]
Win	19–4	Aug 2007	Timișoara, Romania	Challenger	Clay	(Spain) Santiago Ventura	(North Macedonia) Lazar Magdinčev (North Macedonia) Predrag Rusevski	6–1, 6–4
Win	20–4	Sep 2007	Seville, Spain	Challenger	Clay	(Spain) Santiago Ventura	(Spain) Miquel Pérez Puigdomènech (Spain) José Antonio Sánchez de Luna	6–3, 6–3
Win	21–4	Sep 2007	Bucharest, Romania	Challenger	Clay	(Spain) Santiago Ventura	(Romania) Florin Mergea (Romania) Horia Tecău	6–2, 6–1
Win	22–4	Oct 2007	Tarragona, Spain	Challenger	Clay	(Spain) Santiago Ventura	(Spain) Pablo Andújar (Spain) Daniel Muñoz de la Nava	6–4, 7–6^{(7–3)}
Loss	22–5	Oct 2007	Bogotá, Colombia	Challenger	Clay	(Spain) Santiago Ventura	(Brazil) Thomaz Bellucci (Brazil) Bruno Soares	4–6, 6–4, [9–11]
Win	23–5	Oct 2007	Belo Horizonte, Brazil	Challenger	Clay	(Spain) Santiago Ventura	(Chile) Adrián García (Argentina) Leonardo Mayer	6–3, 6–3
Loss	23–6	Nov 2007	Montevideo, Uruguay	Challenger	Clay	(Spain) Santiago Ventura	(Uruguay) Pablo Cuevas (Peru) Luis Horna	w/o
Win	24–6	Mar 2008	Barletta, Italy	Challenger	Clay	(Italy) Flavio Cipolla	(Austria) Oliver Marach (Slovakia) Michal Mertiňák	6–3, 2–6, [11–9]
Win	25–6	Dec 2009	Khanty-Mansiysk, Russia	Challenger	Hard (i)	(Spain) Gerard Granollers Pujol	(Russia) Evgeny Kirillov (Russia) Andrey Kuznetsov	6–3, 6–2
Win	26–6	Jun 2010	Prostějov, Czech Republic	Challenger	Clay	(Spain) David Marrero	(Sweden) Johan Brunström (Netherlands Antilles) Jean-Julien Rojer	3–6, 6–4, [10–6]
Win	27–6	Jul 2010	Pozoblanco, Spain	Challenger	Hard	(Spain) Gerard Granollers Pujol	(United States) Brian Battistone (Sweden) Filip Prpic	6–4, 4–6, [10–4]
Loss	27–7	Sep 2010	Todi, Italy	Challenger	Clay	(Spain) Gerard Granollers Pujol	(Italy) Flavio Cipolla (Italy) Alessio di Mauro	1–6, 4–6
Win	28–7	Jan 2018	Bangkok, Thailand	Challenger	Hard	(Spain) Gerard Granollers Pujol	(Czech Republic) Zdeněk Kolář (Portugal) Gonçalo Oliveira	6–3, 7–6^{(8–6)}
Win	29–7	Feb 2018	Burnie, Australia	Challenger	Hard	(Spain) Gerard Granollers Pujol	(United States) Evan King (United States) Max Schnur	7–6^{(10–8)}, 6–2
Loss	29–8	Jul 2018	Winnipeg, Canada	Challenger	Hard	(Spain) Gerard Granollers Pujol	(Switzerland) Marc-Andrea Hüsler (Netherlands) Sem Verbeek	7–6^{(7–5)}, 3–6, [12–14]
Win	30–8	Jul 2018	Binghamton, USA	Challenger	Hard	(Spain) Gerard Granollers Pujol	(Colombia) Alejandro Gómez (Brazil) Caio Silva	7–6^{(7–2)}, 6–4
Win	31–8	Jun 2019	Surbiton, United Kingdom	Challenger	Grass	(Japan) Ben McLachlan	(South Korea) Kwon Soon-woo (India) Ramkumar Ramanathan	4–6, 6–3, [10–2]

== Performance timelines ==
Key
W	F	SF	QF	#R	RR	Q#	P#	DNQ	A	Z#	PO	G	S	B	NMS	NTI	P	NH

(W) winner; (F) finalist; (SF) semifinalist; (QF) quarterfinalist; (#R) rounds 4, 3, 2, 1; (RR) round-robin stage; (Q#) qualification round; (P#) preliminary round; (DNQ) did not qualify; (A) absent; (Z#) Davis/Fed Cup Zonal Group (with number indication) or (PO) play-off; (G) gold, (S) silver or (B) bronze Olympic/Paralympic medal; (NMS) not a Masters tournament; (NTI) not a Tier I tournament; (P) postponed; (NH) not held; (SR) strike rate (events won / competed); (W–L) win–loss record.
To avoid confusion and double counting, these charts are updated at the conclusion of a tournament or when the player's participation has ended.

=== Singles ===
Tournament	2006	2007	2008	2009	2010	2011	2012	2013	2014	2015	2016	2017	2018	2019	SR	W–L	Win%
Grand Slam tournaments
Australian Open	A	A	1R	2R	2R	1R	2R	2R	1R	2R	2R	1R	A	1R	0 / 11	6–11	35%
French Open	A	Q2	2R	1R	2R	2R	4R	1R	4R	2R	4R	1R	Q1	A	0 / 10	12–10	55%
Wimbledon	1R	Q2	1R	2R	2R	1R	1R	1R	2R	2R	2R	1R	Q2	2R	0 / 12	6–12	33%
US Open	A	Q1	1R	2R	2R	3R	2R	4R	3R	2R	2R	A	1R	1R	0 / 11	12–11	52%
Win–loss	0–1	0–0	1–4	3–4	4–4	3–4	5–4	4–4	6–4	4–4	5–4	0–3	0–1	1–3	0 / 44	36–44	45%
ATP Masters 1000
Indian Wells Masters	A	A	A	1R	A	1R	3R	1R	A	1R	2R	2R	A	A	0 / 7	2–7	22%
Miami Masters	A	A	A	A	A	4R	2R	2R	1R	1R	2R	1R	A	Q2	0 / 7	4–7	36%
Monte-Carlo Masters	A	Q1	A	2R	1R	1R	1R	2R	1R	2R	QF	1R	Q2	A	0 / 9	5–9	36%
Madrid Open	A	A	2R	1R	1R	2R	2R	1R	1R	3R	2R	1R	Q1	Q1	0 / 10	5–10	33%
Italian Open	A	A	A	1R	1R	Q1	3R	QF	2R	1R	A	A	A	A	0 / 6	6–6	50%
Canadian Open	A	A	A	A	A	A	QF	2R	1R	A	A	A	A	Q2	0 / 3	4–3	57%
Cincinnati Masters	A	A	A	A	A	A	1R	2R	1R	A	2R	A	A	A	0 / 4	2–4	33%
Shanghai Masters	NMS			A	A	1R	A	2R	1R	A	3R	A	A	Q2	0 / 4	3–4	43%
Paris Masters	A	A	2R	A	1R	1R	2R	2R	A	1R	A	A	A	A	0 / 6	2–6	25%
German Open	A	A	1R	Not Masters Series											0 / 1	0–1	0%
Win–loss	0–0	0–0	1–3	1–4	0–4	4–6	8–8	8–9	1–7	3–6	7–6	0–4	0–0	0–0	0 / 57	33–57	37%
Career statistics
	2006	2007	2008	2009	2010	2011	2012	2013	2014	2015	2016	2017	2018	2019	Career		
Tournaments	2	2	21	25	22	24	23	24	28	21	25	17	4	12	250		
Titles–Runners-up	0–0	0–0	1–1	0–0	0–1	2–2	0–1	1–1	0–1	0–0	0–0	0–0	0–0	0–0	4 / 7		
Overall win–loss	0–2	2–2	15–20	16–25	21–22	27–25	23–23	27–24	19–28	14–21	21–25	4–17	5–4	8–12	4 / 250	202–250	45%
Year-end ranking	160	132	56	91	42	27	34	38	46	84	37	177	96	111	$12,252,136		

=== Doubles ===
Current through the 2025 Davis Cup Finals.

Tournament	2007	2008	2009	2010	2011	2012	2013	2014	2015	2016	2017	2018	2019	2020	2021	2022	2023	2024	2025	SR	W–L
Grand Slam tournaments
Australian Open	A	2R	1R	2R	3R	1R	SF	2R	1R	SF	QF	2R	1R	3R	1R	SF	SF	3R	A	0 / 17	29–17
French Open	2R	2R	2R	1R	2R	1R	QF	F	1R	QF	QF	2R	1R	3R	2R	SF	SF	SF	W	1 / 19	40–17
Wimbledon	1R	QF	1R	QF	3R	1R	1R	3R	2R	3R	3R	2R	1R	NH	F	A	F	SF	SF	0 / 17	33–17
US Open	2R	1R	2R	SF	3R	SF	3R	F	3R	1R	3R	3R	F	1R	QF	1R	3R	QF	W	1 / 19	44–16
Win–loss	2–3	5–4	2–3	8–4	7–2	4–4	9–4	13–4	3–4	9–4	10–4	5–4	5–4	4–3	7–4	8–3	15–4	12–4	16–1	2 / 72	146–67
Year-end championship
ATP Finals	Did not qualify					W	RR	RR	DNQ		RR	DNQ		SF	SF	RR	F	RR	RR	1 / 10	15–20
ATP Masters Series 1000
Indian Wells Masters	A	A	A	A	1R	2R	2R	A	2R	1R	1R	A	A	NH	1R	2R	1R	F	1R	0 / 11	7–11
Miami Masters	A	A	A	A	1R	2R	SF	1R	1R	2R	QF	A	2R	NH	1R	QF	1R	SF	1R	0 / 13	13–13
Monte-Carlo Masters	A	A	A	1R	QF	SF	2R	1R	QF	1R	QF	QF	1R	NH	SF	QF	1R	SF	1R	0 / 15	13–14
Madrid Open	As Hamburg		QF	SF	2R	QF	2R	2R	SF	2R	QF	2R	1R	NH	W	QF	1R	SF	W	2 / 16	28–14
Italian Open	A	A	A	A	QF	W	SF	2R	F	QF	F	SF	A	W	QF	A	SF	W	QF	3 / 13	37–10
Canadian Open	A	A	A	A	A	F	QF	QF	A	A	A	A	W	NH	A	QF	SF	W	A	2 / 7	18–5
Cincinnati Masters	A	A	A	A	A	QF	F	2R	A	2R	A	A	A	QF	W	QF	1R	SF	A	1 / 9	14–8
Shanghai Masters	Not Held	QF	A	A	A	2R	QF	SF	A	QF	QF	A	2R	NH			W	2R	A	1 / 9	14–7
Paris Masters	A	A	F	1R	A	A	QF	SF	2R	A	F	W	2R	A	A	2R	QF	2R	2R	1 / 12	16–11
Win–loss	0–0	2–1	4–2	3–3	4–4	16–6	11–9	7–8	7–6	7–7	11–7	10–3	8–5	5–0	11–4	6–7	12–8	23–6	7–5	10/105	160–93
Career statistics
	2007	2008	2009	2010	2011	2012	2013	2014	2015	2016	2017	2018	2019	2020	2021	2022	2023	2024	2025	Career	
Titles–Finals	0–0	0–1	3–5	2–4	1–3	3–7	0–1	1–3	0–1	3–4	2–5	1–1	2–3	3–4	1–4	1–1	1–4	2–5	5–5	32–61	
Win–loss	8–7	19–23	33–17	34–21	32–17	43–22	31–23	38–24	15–18	35–16	36–21	20–15	28–19	24–8	27–16	25–21	38–23	45–16	34–10	566–340	62%
Year-end ranking	59	60	25	22	32	10	12	8	39	18	14	25	25	9	7	17	10	4	6	$15,868,397	

== Wins over top 10 players ==
- He has a 6–36 record against players who were, at the time the match was played, ranked in the top 10.

Year	2003	2004	2005	2006	2007	2008	2009	2010	2011	2012	2013	2014	2015	2016	2017–19	Total
Wins	0	0	0	0	0	1	0	1	1	0	1	1	0	1	0	6

#	Player	Rank	Tournament	Surface	Rd	Score
2008
1.	(United States) James Blake	8	Houston, United States	Clay	F	6–4, 1–6, 7–5
2010
2.	(Sweden) Robin Söderling	8	Australian Open, Australia	Hard	1R	5–7, 2–6, 6–4, 6–4, 6–2
2011
3.	(France) Gaël Monfils	10	Valencia, Spain	Hard	QF	7–6^{(14–12)}, 3–6, 6–4
2013
4.	(United Kingdom) Andy Murray	2	Rome, Italy	Clay	2R	6–3, 6–7^{(5–7)}, ret.
2014
5.	(Spain) David Ferrer	5	Tokyo, Japan	Hard	1R	4–6, 6–4, 6–4
2016
6.	(Czech Republic) Tomáš Berdych	9	Shanghai, China	Hard	2R	7–6^{(7–4)}, 7–6^{(7–1)}
