= 2018 Jinan International Open – Men's singles =

Men's singles
- 2018 Jinan International Open

Final
- Champion: (Australia) Alexei Popyrin
- Runner-up: (United Kingdom) James Ward
- Score: 3–6, 6–1, 7–5

Events
Singles	men	women
Doubles	men	women
← 2017 ·	Jinan International Open	· 2019 →

Lu Yen-hsun was the defending champion but chose not to defend his title.

Alexei Popyrin won the title after defeating James Ward 3–6, 6–1, 7–5 in the final.

== Seeds ==
1. (India) Ramkumar Ramanathan (first round)
2. (Switzerland) Henri Laaksonen (withdrew)
3. (Serbia) Nikola Milojević (first round)
4. (Kazakhstan) Alexander Bublik (first round)
5. (Japan) Tatsuma Ito (second round)
6. (Japan) Hiroki Moriya (first round)
7. (Serbia) Peđa Krstin (first round, retired)
8. (Chinese Taipei) Yang Tsung-hua (second round)

== Draw ==
=== Key ===
- Q = Qualifier
- WC = Wild card
- LL = Lucky loser
- Alt = Alternate
- SE = Special exempt
- PR = Protected ranking
- ITF = ITF entry
- JE = Junior exempt
- w/o = Walkover
- r = Retired
- d = Defaulted
- SR = Special ranking

=== Finals ===
Semifinals
Q	(Australia) Alexei Popyrin	6	3	6
WC	(China) Zhang Zhizhen	4	6	1
(United Kingdom) James Ward	6	6
WC	(China) Xia Zihao	2	1

Final
Q	(Australia) Alexei Popyrin	3	6	7
(United Kingdom) James Ward	6	1	5

=== Top half ===
First round
1	(India) R Ramanathan	3	4
(Finland) H Heliövaara	6	6
(Serbia) D Petrović	4	2
(Kazakhstan) D Yevseyev	6	6
Q	(China) Y Bai	3	5
Q	(Australia) A Popyrin	6	7
(Australia) A Santillan	4^{r}
8	(Chinese Taipei) T-h Yang	5
4	(Kazakhstan) A Bublik	6	3	6^{4}
(China) Z Li	4	6	7^{7}
WC	(China) X Gao	5	0^{r}
WC	(China) Zh Zhang	7	2
(Russia) R Safiullin	6	7^{7}
(Japan) Renta Tokuda	3	6^{3}
(Australia) M Banes	6	1	2
5	(Japan) T Ito	3	6	6

Second round
(Finland) H Heliövaara	2	4
(Kazakhstan) D Yevseyev	6	6
Q	(Australia) A Popyrin	4	7^{7}	7
8	(Chinese Taipei) T-h Yang	6	6^{4}	5
(China) Z Li	6	3	4
WC	(China) Zh Zhang	4	6	6
(Russia) R Safiullin	7^{9}	7
5	(Japan) T Ito	6^{7}	5

Quarterfinals
(Kazakhstan) D Yevseyev	3	6	3
Q	(Australia) A Popyrin	6	3	6
WC	(China) Zh Zhang	6	6
(Russia) R Safiullin	4	4

Semifinals
Q	(Australia) A Popyrin	6	3	6
WC	(China) Zh Zhang	4	6	1

=== Bottom half ===
First round
7	(Serbia) P Krstin	6^{6}	0^{r}
(India) A Kadhe	7^{8}	3
(United Kingdom) J Ward	2	7	6
WC	(China) Y He	6	5	1
Q	(India) Manish Sureshkumar	1	3
(South Korea) D-h Lee	6	6
(China) Y Wu	6	6
3	(Serbia) N Milojević	3	4
6	(Japan) H Moriya	3	4
(China) Ze Zhang	6	6
(Japan) Y Takahashi	6	6
(Japan) Hiroyasu Ehara	4	3
Q	(France) TK Wang	5	6^{3}
(China) D Wu	7	7^{7}
WC	(China) Xia Zihao	2	4
LL	(Chinese Taipei) T-l Wu	6	1^{r}

Second round
(India) A Kadhe	3	1
(United Kingdom) J Ward	6	6
(South Korea) D-h Lee	6	6
(China) Y Wu	0	3
(China) Ze Zhang	6	6
(Japan) Y Takahashi	4	3
(China) D Wu	4	2
WC	(China) Z Xia	6	6

Quarterfinals
(United Kingdom) J Ward	3	7	6
(South Korea) D-h Lee	6	5	4
(China) Ze Zhang	4^{r}
WC	(China) Z Xia	5

Semifinals
(United Kingdom) J Ward	6	6
WC	(China) Z Xia	2	1
