= 2018 Jinan International Open – Men's doubles =

Men's doubles
- 2018 Jinan International Open

Final
- Champions: (Chinese Taipei) Hsieh Cheng-peng (Chinese Taipei) Yang Tsung-hua
- Runners-up: (Kazakhstan) Alexander Bublik (Russia) Alexander Pavlioutchenkov
- Score: 7–6^{(7–5)}, 4–6, [10–5]

Events
Singles	men	women
Doubles	men	women
← 2017 ·	Jinan International Open	· 2019 →

Hsieh Cheng-peng and Peng Hsien-yin were the defending champions but chose to defend their title with different partners. Hsieh partnered Yang Tsung-hua and successfully defended his title. Peng partnered Yi Chu-huan but lost in the first round to Benjamin Lock and Rubin Statham.

Hsieh and Yang won the title after defeating Alexander Bublik and Alexander Pavlioutchenkov 7–6^{(7–5)}, 4–6, [10–5] in the final.

== Seeds ==
1. (Thailand) Sanchai Ratiwatana / (Thailand) Sonchat Ratiwatana (semifinals)
2. (Chinese Taipei) Peng Hsien-yin / (Chinese Taipei) Yi Chu-huan (first round)
3. (China) Gong Maoxin / (China) Zhang Ze (first round)
4. (India) Arjun Kadhe / (Japan) Toshihide Matsui (first round)

== Draw ==
=== Key ===
- Q = Qualifier
- WC = Wild card
- LL = Lucky loser
- Alt = Alternate
- SE = Special exempt
- PR = Protected ranking
- ITF = ITF entry
- JE = Junior exempt
- w/o = Walkover
- r = Retired
- d = Defaulted
- SR = Special ranking

First round
1	(Thailand) Sa Ratiwatana (Thailand) So Ratiwatana	6	6
WC	(China) Jin Yuquan (China) Li Zekai	2	2
(Chinese Taipei) T Chen (Croatia) M Sabanov	6^{5}	7^{7}	[10]
(Russia) M Elgin (Belarus) Y Shyla	7^{7}	6^{5}	[6]
3	(China) M Gong (China) Ze Zhang	6	3	[7]
(Chinese Taipei) C-p Hsieh (Chinese Taipei) T-h Yang	4	6	[10]
WC	(China) X Gao (China) F Sun	6	6
WC	(China) Y He (China) Zh Zhang	4	3
(Serbia) N Milojević (Japan) H Moriya	1	3
Alt	(India) S Mukund (Netherlands) Miliaan Niesten	6	6
(China) Z Li (China) D Wu	3	7	[11]
4	(India) A Kadhe (Japan) T Matsui	6	5	[9]
(Serbia) D Petrović (Croatia) I Sabanov	7^{7}	3	[8]
(Kazakhstan) A Bublik (Russia) A Pavlioutchenkov	6^{5}	6	[10]
(Zimbabwe) B Lock (New Zealand) R Statham	6	6
2	(Chinese Taipei) H-y Peng (Chinese Taipei) C-h Yi	4	4

Quarterfinals
1	(Thailand) Sa Ratiwatana (Thailand) So Ratiwatana	6	6
(Chinese Taipei) T Chen (Croatia) M Sabanov	2	3
(Chinese Taipei) C-p Hsieh (Chinese Taipei) T-h Yang	4	6	[10]
WC	(China) X Gao (China) F Sun	6	1	[6]
Alt	(India) S Mukund (Netherlands) M Niesten	6	3	[5]
(China) Z Li (China) D Wu	3	6	[10]
(Kazakhstan) A Bublik (Russia) A Pavlioutchenkov	6	0	[10]
(Zimbabwe) B Lock (New Zealand) R Statham	3	6	[5]

Semifinals
1	(Thailand) Sa Ratiwatana (Thailand) So Ratiwatana	1	0
(Chinese Taipei) C-p Hsieh (Chinese Taipei) T-h Yang	6	6
(China) Z Li (China) D Wu	6^{4}	6^{1}
(Kazakhstan) A Bublik (Russia) A Pavlioutchenkov	7^{7}	7^{7}

Final
(Chinese Taipei) C-p Hsieh (Chinese Taipei) T-h Yang	7^{7}	4	[10]
(Kazakhstan) A Bublik (Russia) A Pavlioutchenkov	6^{5}	6	[5]
