= 2024 Jinan Open – Men's doubles =

Men's doubles
- 2024 Jinan Open

Final
- Champions: (South Korea) Chung Yun-seong (Japan) Yuta Shimizu
- Runners-up: (Japan) Rio Noguchi (Australia) Edward Winter
- Score: 6–3, 6–7^{(5–7)}, [10–6]

Events
Singles	men	women
Doubles	men	women
← 2019 ·	Jinan Open	· 2025 →

Matthew Ebden and Divij Sharan were the defending champions but chose not to defend their title.

Chung Yun-seong and Yuta Shimizu won the title after defeating Rio Noguchi and Edward Winter 6–3, 6–7^{(5–7)}, [10–6] in the final.

== Seeds ==
1. (Chinese Taipei) Ray Ho / (South Korea) Nam Ji-sung (first round)
2. (South Korea) Chung Yun-seong / (Japan) Yuta Shimizu (champions)
3. (Philippines) Francis Alcantara / (China) Sun Fajing (semifinals)
4. (United Kingdom) Aidan McHugh / (New Zealand) Ajeet Rai (first round)

== Draw ==
=== Key ===
- Q = Qualifier
- WC = Wild card
- LL = Lucky loser
- Alt = Alternate
- ITF = ITF entry
- PR = Protected ranking
- SR = Special ranking
- SE = Special exempt
- JE = Junior exempt
- JR = Junior Accelerator Programme entrant
- CO = College Accelerator Programme entrant
- NG = Next Gen Accelerator Program entrant
- w/o = Walkover
- r = Retired
- d = Defaulted

=== Draw ===
First round
1	(Chinese Taipei) R Ho (South Korea) J-s Nam	0	6	[9]
(Japan) R Noguchi (Australia) E Winter	6	2	[11]
(Japan) Makoto Ochi (Japan) S Watanabe	6	1	[14]
(Thailand) P Isaro (Indonesia) C Rungkat	4	6	[12]
4	(United Kingdom) A McHugh (New Zealand) A Rai	6^{1}	2
(South Korea) Shin San-hui (France) A Weber	7^{7}	6
WC	(China) Jin Yuquan (China) Li Zekai	2	6	[3]
WC	(China) A Wang (China) Y Zhou	6	4	[10]
E Agafonov; E Karlovskiy	3	4
(South Africa) P Henning (South Africa) Kris van Wyk	6	6
Mikalai Haliak (Greece) S Sakellaridis	4	3
3	(Philippines) FC Alcantara (China) F Sun	6	6
B Bobrov; E Donskoy	3	2
(Chinese Taipei) T-h Huang (Chinese Taipei) T-l Wu	6	6
(China) J Cui (South Korea) Shin Woo-bin	4	2
2	(South Korea) Y-s Chung (Japan) Y Shimizu	6	6

Quarterfinals
(Japan) R Noguchi (Australia) E Winter	7^{7}	2	[10]
(Japan) M Ochi (Japan) S Watanabe	6^{1}	6	[8]
(South Korea) S-h Shin (France) A Weber	4	4
WC	(China) A Wang (China) Y Zhou	6	6
(South Africa) P Henning (South Africa) K van Wyk	6	4	[8]
3	(Philippines) FC Alcantara (China) F Sun	1	6	[10]
(Chinese Taipei) T-h Huang (Chinese Taipei) T-l Wu	6^{2}	6	[3]
2	(South Korea) Y-s Chung (Japan) Y Shimizu	7^{7}	3	[10]

Semifinals
(Japan) R Noguchi (Australia) E Winter	6	6
WC	(China) A Wang (China) Y Zhou	3	4
3	(Philippines) FC Alcantara (China) F Sun	6^{4}	4
2	(South Korea) Y-s Chung (Japan) Y Shimizu	7^{7}	6

Final
(Japan) R Noguchi (Australia) E Winter	3	7^{7}	[6]
2	(South Korea) Y-s Chung (Japan) Y Shimizu	6	6^{5}	[10]
