= 2024 Jinan Open – Men's singles =

Men's singles
- 2024 Jinan Open

Final
- Champion: (China) Wu Yibing
- Runner-up: (Japan) Rio Noguchi
- Score: 7–5, 6–3

Events
Singles	men	women
Doubles	men	women
← 2019 ·	Jinan Open	· 2025 →

Zhang Zhizhen was the defending champion but chose not to defend his title.

Wu Yibing won the title after defeating Rio Noguchi 7–5, 6–3 in the final.

== Seeds ==
1. (Japan) Yuta Shimizu (semifinals)
2. (China) Bai Yan (second round)
3. (United Kingdom) Ryan Peniston (first round)
4. (Chinese Taipei) Wu Tung-lin (second round)
5. (Japan) Rio Noguchi (final)
6. (China) Cui Jie (first round)
7. Mikalai Haliak (first round)
8. (Japan) Kaichi Uchida (first round)

== Draw ==
Key

- Q = Qualifier
- WC = Wild card
- LL = Lucky loser
- Alt = Alternate
- ITF = ITF entry
- PR = Protected ranking
- SR = Special ranking
- SE = Special exempt
- JE = Junior exempt
- JR = Junior Accelerator Programme entrant
- CO = College Accelerator Programme entrant
- NG = Next Gen Accelerator Program entrant
- w/o = Walkover
- r = Retired
- d = Defaulted

=== Finals ===
Semifinals
1	(Japan) Yuta Shimizu	6^{4}	6	5
5	(Japan) Rio Noguchi	7^{7}	3	7
WC	(China) Wu Yibing	3	6	6
Q	(United States) Keegan Smith	6	0	2

Final
5	(Japan) Rio Noguchi	5	3
WC	(China) Wu Yibing	7	6

=== Top half ===
First round
1	(Japan) Y Shimizu	6	6
WC	(China) Jin Yuquan	4	2
(United States) A Ayeni	6^{4}	2
(China) Y Zhou	7^{7}	6
(South Africa) P Henning	6	6
(Japan) H Moriya	0	4
Q	(South Korea) Shin San-hui	6	6
6	(China) J Cui	0	2
3	(United Kingdom) R Peniston	5	3
Q	(South Korea) Shin Woo-bin	7	6
Alt	(New Zealand) A Rai	6	1	6
(France) A Weber	4	6	3
(South Africa) Kris van Wyk	6^{3}	4
(United Kingdom) A McHugh	7^{7}	6
B Bobrov	5	4
5	(Japan) R Noguchi	7	6

Second round
1	(Japan) Y Shimizu	6	6
(China) Y Zhou	2	1
(South Africa) P Henning	6	6
Q	(South Korea) S-h Shin	2	3
Q	(South Korea) W-b Shin	3	6	6
Alt	(New Zealand) A Rai	6	1	4
(United Kingdom) A McHugh	3	3
5	(Japan) R Noguchi	6	6

Quarterfinals
1	(Japan) Y Shimizu	6	5	7
(South Africa) P Henning	4	7	5
Q	(South Korea) W-b Shin	3	2
5	(Japan) R Noguchi	6	6

Semifinals
1	(Japan) Y Shimizu	6^{4}	6	5
5	(Japan) R Noguchi	7^{7}	3	7

=== Bottom half ===
First round
8	(Japan) K Uchida	6^{9}	6	6^{9}
Q	(Australia) Jacob Bradshaw	7^{11}	2	7^{11}
(China) F Sun	6	6
E Karlovskiy	2	4
(Greece) S Sakellaridis	6	1	4
WC	(China) Y Wu	4	6	6
WC	(China) Xiao Linang	3	4
4	(Chinese Taipei) T-l Wu	6	6
7	Mikalai Haliak	4	1
Q	(United States) K Smith	6	6
(Czech Republic) D Palán	3	7^{7}	3
Q	(South Korea) J-s Nam	6	6^{5}	6
Q	(China) Y Mo	6	6
(Japan) Makoto Ochi	2	3
E Donskoy	2	6^{6}
2	(China) Y Bai	6	7^{8}

Second round
Q	(Australia) J Bradshaw	2	6	6^{4}
(China) F Sun	6	2	7^{7}
WC	(China) Y Wu	7	7
4	(Chinese Taipei) T-l Wu	5	5
Q	(United States) K Smith	7^{8}	7
Q	(South Korea) J-s Nam	6^{6}	5
Q	(China) Y Mo	6	6^{5}	6
2	(China) Y Bai	4	7^{7}	4

Quarterfinals
(China) F Sun	3	2
WC	(China) Y Wu	6	6
Q	(United States) K Smith	6	6
Q	(China) Y Mo	2	2

Semifinals
WC	(China) Y Wu	3	6	6
Q	(United States) K Smith	6	0	2
