= 2025 Busan Open – Singles =

Singles
- 2025 Busan Open

Final
- Champion: (France) Térence Atmane
- Runner-up: (Australia) Adam Walton
- Score: 6–3, 6–4

Events
Singles	Doubles
- Busan Open

Yasutaka Uchiyama was the defending champion but lost in the quarterfinals to Adam Walton.

Térence Atmane won the title after defeating Walton 6–3, 6–4 in the final.

== Seeds ==
1. (Australia) Adam Walton (final)
2. (United States) Christopher Eubanks (first round)
3. (United States) Brandon Holt (semifinals)
4. (Australia) Tristan Schoolkate (first round)
5. (Japan) Yasutaka Uchiyama (quarterfinals)
6. (Australia) Li Tu (second round)
7. (Japan) James Trotter (first round)
8. (France) Térence Atmane (champion)

== Draw ==
Key

- Q = Qualifier
- WC = Wild card
- LL = Lucky loser
- Alt = Alternate
- ITF = ITF entry
- PR = Protected ranking
- SR = Special ranking
- SE = Special exempt
- JE = Junior exempt
- JR = Junior Accelerator Programme entrant
- CO = College Accelerator Programme entrant
- NG = Next Gen Accelerator Program entrant
- w/o = Walkover
- r = Retired
- d = Defaulted

=== Finals ===
Semifinals
1	(Australia) Adam Walton	7^{8}	6^{3}	7
PR	(Australia) Jason Kubler	6^{6}	7^{7}	5
3	(United States) Brandon Holt	6^{5}	6	3
8	(France) Térence Atmane	7^{7}	3	6

Final
1	(Australia) Adam Walton	3	4
8	(France) Térence Atmane	6	6

=== Top half ===
First round
1	(Australia) A Walton	6	6
(Japan) R Noguchi	0	2
(Japan) S Shimabukuro	3	1
(Japan) Y Shimizu	6	6
WC	(South Korea) S-w Kwon	3	6	7
(France) A Escoffier	6	1	5
Q	(Germany) M Rosenkranz	6^{4}	3
5	(Japan) Y Uchiyama	7^{7}	6
4	(Australia) T Schoolkate	4	6	3
WC	(South Korea) G Campaña Lee	6	3	6
PR	(Australia) J Kubler	7	6
(Japan) R Sakamoto	5	4
(Finland) E Ruusuvuori	2	4
WC	(South Korea) H Chung	6	6
Q	M Sharipov	2	6	1
6	(Australia) L Tu	6	3	6

Second round
1	(Australia) A Walton	6	7^{7}
(Japan) Y Shimizu	2	6^{4}
WC	(South Korea) S-w Kwon	1	6	6^{1}
5	(Japan) Y Uchiyama	6	1	7^{7}
WC	(South Korea) G Campaña Lee	3	0
PR	(Australia) J Kubler	6	6
WC	(South Korea) H Chung	3	6	6
6	(Australia) L Tu	6	3	4

Quarterfinals
1	(Australia) A Walton	7	5	6
5	(Japan) Y Uchiyama	5	7	3
PR	(Australia) J Kubler	6	6
WC	(South Korea) H Chung	2	4

Semifinals
1	(Australia) A Walton	7^{8}	6^{3}	7
PR	(Australia) J Kubler	6^{6}	7^{7}	5

=== Bottom half ===
First round
7	(Japan) J Trotter	3	3
(Chinese Taipei) Y-h Hsu	6	6
Q	(United Kingdom) J Monday	3	4
Q	(South Korea) Shin San-hui	6	6
(Japan) Y Watanuki	3	6^{4}
(Australia) A Bolt	6	7^{7}
(France) C Lestienne	6	6^{2}	4
3	(United States) B Holt	1	7^{7}	6
8	(France) T Atmane	7^{7}	7^{7}
(Australia) J McCabe	6^{4}	6^{2}
Q	(Norway) V Durasovic	6	3	2
(Australia) O Jasika	0	6	6
A Kachmazov	7^{9}	4	3
Q	I Simakin	6^{7}	6	6
(United States) Z Svajda	3	7^{7}	6
2	(United States) C Eubanks	6	6^{3}	0

Second round
(Chinese Taipei) Y-h Hsu	6	6
Q	(South Korea) S-h Shin	2	2
(Australia) A Bolt	3	4
3	(United States) B Holt	6	6
8	(France) T Atmane	6	2	6
(Australia) O Jasika	3	6	4
Q	I Simakin	7^{7}	6
(United States) Z Svajda	6^{3}	1

Quarterfinals
(Chinese Taipei) Y-h Hsu	2	2
3	(United States) B Holt	6	6
8	(France) T Atmane	6	1	6
Q	I Simakin	4	6	3

Semifinals
3	(United States) B Holt	6^{5}	6	3
8	(France) T Atmane	7^{7}	3	6
