= 2019 Jinan International Open – Women's doubles =

Women's doubles
- 2019 Jinan International Open

Final
- Champions: (China) Yuan Yue (China) Zheng Wushuang
- Runners-up: (United Kingdom) Samantha Murray (United Kingdom) Eden Silva
- Score: 1–6, 6–4, [10–7]

Events
Singles	men	women
Doubles	men	women
← 2018 ·	Jinan International Open	· 2020 →

Wang Xinyu and You Xiaodi were the defending champions, but Wang chose to compete at the 2019 US Open instead. You partnered alongside Chihiro Muramatsu, but lost in the first round to Eudice Chong and Aldila Sutjiadi.

Yuan Yue and Zheng Wushuang won the title, defeating Samantha Murray and Eden Silva in the final, 1–6, 6–4, [10–7].

== Seeds ==
1. (Thailand) Peangtarn Plipuech / (Indonesia) Jessy Rompies (first round)
2. (Hong Kong) Eudice Chong / (Indonesia) Aldila Sutjiadi (quarterfinals)
3. (China) Jiang Xinyu / (China) Tang Qianhui (quarterfinals)
4. (United Kingdom) Samantha Murray / (United Kingdom) Eden Silva (final)

== Draw ==
=== Key ===
- Q = Qualifier
- WC = Wild card
- LL = Lucky loser
- Alt = Alternate
- SE = Special exempt
- PR = Protected ranking
- ITF = ITF entry
- JE = Junior exempt
- w/o = Walkover
- r = Retired
- d = Defaulted
- SR = Special ranking

=== Draw ===
First round
1	(Thailand) P Plipuech (Indonesia) J Rompies	5	7^{7}	[5]
(Bulgaria) A Naydenova (Australia) O Tjandramulia	7	6^{5}	[10]
(Japan) A Okuno (Japan) M Uchijima	4	6	[7]
(China) H Guo (China) J Kang	6	3	[10]
4	(United Kingdom) S Murray (United Kingdom) E Silva	w/o
(South Korea) S-j Jang (China) Yu Zhang
Alt	(Hong Kong) K-y Ng (Russia) Y Sizikova	3	0
(China) X Sun (China) F Xun	6	6
WC	(China) J Wang (China) J Zhang	1	3
WC	(China) J Chen (China) F Liu	6	6
(India) R Bhosale (China) Yi Zhang	2	4
3	(China) X Jiang (China) Q Tang	6	6
(Japan) M Hontama (Japan) E Sema	6	6^{7}	[1]
WC	(China) Y Yuan (China) W Zheng	1	7^{9}	[10]
(Japan) C Muramatsu (China) X You	3	3
2	(Hong Kong) E Chong (Indonesia) A Sutjiadi	6	6

Quarterfinals
(Bulgaria) A Naydenova (Australia) O Tjandramulia	1	4
(China) H Guo (China) J Kang	6	6
4	(United Kingdom) S Murray (United Kingdom) E Silva	6	5	[10]
(China) X Sun (China) F Xun	3	7	[1]
WC	(China) J Chen (China) F Liu	6	4	[10]
3	(China) X Jiang (China) Q Tang	3	6	[7]
WC	(China) Y Yuan (China) W Zheng	4	6	[10]
2	(Hong Kong) E Chong (Indonesia) A Sutjiadi	6	3	[7]

Semifinals
(China) H Guo (China) J Kang	6^{2}	6^{3}
2	(United Kingdom) S Murray (United Kingdom) E Silva	7^{7}	7^{7}
WC	(China) J Chen (China) F Liu	4	0
WC	(China) Y Yuan (China) W Zheng	6	6

Final
2	(United Kingdom) S Murray (United Kingdom) E Silva	6	4	[7]
WC	(China) Y Yuan (China) W Zheng	1	6	[10]
