= 2017 China International Challenger Jinan – Doubles =

Doubles
- 2017 China International Challenger Jinan

Final
- Champions: (Chinese Taipei) Hsieh Cheng-peng (Chinese Taipei) Peng Hsien-yin
- Runners-up: (India) Sriram Balaji (India) Vishnu Vardhan
- Score: 4–6, 6–4, [10–4]

Events
Singles	Doubles
- China International Challenger Jinan

This was the first edition of the tournament.

Hsieh Cheng-peng and Peng Hsien-yin won the title after defeating Sriram Balaji and Vishnu Vardhan 4–6, 6–4, [10–4] in the final.

== Seeds ==
1. (Chinese Taipei) Hsieh Cheng-peng / (Chinese Taipei) Peng Hsien-yin (champions)
2. (Chinese Taipei) Chen Ti / (Chinese Taipei) Yi Chu-huan (semifinals)
3. (India) Sriram Balaji / (India) Vishnu Vardhan (final)
4. (Belarus) Sergey Betov / (Russia) Alexander Kudryavtsev (semifinals)

== Draw ==
Key

- Q = Qualifier
- WC = Wild card
- LL = Lucky loser
- Alt = Alternate
- ITF = ITF entry
- PR = Protected ranking
- SR = Special ranking
- SE = Special exempt
- JE = Junior exempt
- JR = Junior Accelerator Programme entrant
- CO = College Accelerator Programme entrant
- NG = Next Gen Accelerator Program entrant
- w/o = Walkover
- r = Retired
- d = Defaulted

First round
(Japan) T Matsui (Serbia) N Milojević	w/o
(United States) Mousheg Hovhannisyan (New Zealand) F Tearney
4	(Belarus) S Betov (Russia) A Kudryavtsev	7	6
(Lithuania) R Berankis (Belarus) D Zhyrmont	5	2
(India) S Mukund (India) Sidharth Rawat	2	1
(Serbia) M Kecmanović (Spain) M Vilella Martínez	6	6
(China) D Wu (China) Zh Zhang	6	6
(Republic of Ireland) S Barry (Australia) D Kelly	4	4
(India) S Myneni (India) VS Prashanth	2	2
3	(India) S Balaji (India) V Vardhan	6	6
(South Korea) Kim Cheong-eui (Japan) K Takeuchi	5	4
(Japan) Yuya Kibi (Japan) Shuichi Sekiguchi	7	6

Quarterfinals
1	(Chinese Taipei) C-p Hsieh (Chinese Taipei) H-y Peng	6	6^{3}	[11]
(Japan) T Matsui (Serbia) N Milojević	3	7^{7}	[9]
4	(Belarus) S Betov (Russia) A Kudryavtsev	3	6	[11]
(Serbia) M Kecmanović (Spain) M Vilella Martínez	6	3	[9]
(China) D Wu (China) Zh Zhang	6^{4}	3
3	(India) S Balaji (India) V Vardhan	7^{7}	6
(Japan) Y Kibi (Japan) S Sekiguchi	2	3
2	(Chinese Taipei) T Chen (Chinese Taipei) C-h Yi	6	6

Semifinals
1	(Chinese Taipei) C-p Hsieh (Chinese Taipei) H-y Peng	6	6
4	(Belarus) S Betov (Russia) A Kudryavtsev	3	4
3	(India) S Balaji (India) V Vardhan	6	3	[10]
2	(Chinese Taipei) T Chen (Chinese Taipei) C-h Yi	4	6	[5]

Final
1	(Chinese Taipei) C-p Hsieh (Chinese Taipei) H-y Peng	4	6	[10]
3	(India) S Balaji (India) V Vardhan	6	4	[4]
