= 2017 China International Challenger Jinan – Singles =

Singles
- 2017 China International Challenger Jinan

Final
- Champion: (Chinese Taipei) Lu Yen-hsun
- Runner-up: (Lithuania) Ričardas Berankis
- Score: 6–3, 6–1

Events
Singles	Doubles
- China International Challenger Jinan

This was the first edition of the tournament.

Lu Yen-hsun won the title after defeating Ričardas Berankis 6–3, 6–1 in the final.

== Seeds ==
1. (Chinese Taipei) Lu Yen-hsun (champion)
2. (Russia) Evgeny Donskoy (semifinals, withdrew)
3. (Japan) Go Soeda (semifinals)
4. (South Korea) Lee Duck-hee (quarterfinals)
5. (Serbia) Nikola Milojević (second round)
6. (Lithuania) Ričardas Berankis (final)
7. (South Korea) Kwon Soon-woo (quarterfinals)
8. (Japan) Hiroki Moriya (first round)

== Draw ==
Key

- Q = Qualifier
- WC = Wild card
- LL = Lucky loser
- Alt = Alternate
- ITF = ITF entry
- PR = Protected ranking
- SR = Special ranking
- SE = Special exempt
- JE = Junior exempt
- JR = Junior Accelerator Programme entrant
- CO = College Accelerator Programme entrant
- NG = Next Gen Accelerator Program entrant
- w/o = Walkover
- r = Retired
- d = Defaulted

=== Finals ===
Semifinals
1	(Chinese Taipei) Lu Yen-hsun	4	7^{9}	6
3	(Japan) Go Soeda	6	6^{7}	4
6	(Lithuania) Ričardas Berankis	w/o
2	(Russia) Evgeny Donskoy

Final
1	(Chinese Taipei) Lu Yen-hsun	6	6
6	(Lithuania) Ričardas Berankis	3	1

=== Top half ===
First round
1	(Chinese Taipei) Y-h Lu	6	6
LL	(Belarus) S Betov	2	3
(New Zealand) F Tearney	0^{r}
(Serbia) M Kecmanović	1
(Russia) A Kudryavtsev	6	6
(India) S Mukund	3	2
Q	(India) Sidharth Rawat	2	4
7	(South Korea) S-w Kwon	6	6
3	(Japan) G Soeda	6	6
(India) S Balaji	2	2
(Spain) M Vilella Martínez	6^{7}	4
(China) D Wu	7^{9}	6
LL	(United States) Mousheg Hovhannisyan	6^{2}	2
Q	(Japan) K Takeuchi	7^{7}	6
(Belarus) D Zhyrmont	7^{8}	6
8	(Japan) H Moriya	6^{6}	2

Second round
1	(Chinese Taipei) Y-h Lu	6	6
(Serbia) M Kecmanović	0	4
(Russia) A Kudryavtsev	2	6	6^{5}
7	(South Korea) S-w Kwon	6	3	7^{7}
3	(Japan) G Soeda	6	6
(China) D Wu	1	1
Q	(Japan) K Takeuchi	7^{7}	6^{2}	7
(Belarus) D Zhyrmont	6^{5}	7^{7}	5

Quarterfinals
1	(Chinese Taipei) Y-h Lu	6	6
7	(South Korea) S-w Kwon	2	4
3	(Japan) G Soeda	6	6
Q	(Japan) K Takeuchi	0	0

Semifinals
1	(Chinese Taipei) Y-h Lu	4	7^{9}	6
3	(Japan) G Soeda	6	6^{7}	4

=== Bottom half ===
First round
6	(Lithuania) R Berankis	7	6
WC	(China) Zh Zhang	5	4
(India) V Vardhan	7^{7}	6
(Chinese Taipei) T Chen	6^{3}	3
(South Korea) Kim Cheong-eui	3	7^{7}	6
(Republic of Ireland) S Barry	6	6^{4}	4
(Japan) Yuya Kibi	2	2
4	(South Korea) D-h Lee	6	6
5	(Serbia) N Milojević	6	0
LL	(Japan) T Matsui	2	0^{r}
(Japan) T Niki	2	3
(Australia) D Kelly	6	6
Q	(India) VS Prashanth	4	4
(Japan) Shuichi Sekiguchi	6	6
PR	(India) S Myneni	2	2
2	(Russia) E Donskoy	6	6

Second round
6	(Lithuania) R Berankis	6	6
(India) V Vardhan	4	4
(South Korea) C-e Kim	2	1
4	(South Korea) D-h Lee	6	6
5	(Serbia) N Milojević	2	4
(Australia) D Kelly	6	6
(Japan) S Sekiguchi	2	3
2	(Russia) E Donskoy	6	6

Quarterfinals
6	(Lithuania) R Berankis	6	6
4	(South Korea) D-h Lee	1	2
(Australia) D Kelly	3	6	5
2	(Russia) E Donskoy	6	3	7

Semifinals
6	(Lithuania) R Berankis	w/o
2	(Russia) E Donskoy
