= 2019 Jinan International Open =

Tennis tournament

- Date: 26 August–1 September 2019 (women); 2–8 September 2019 (men)
- Edition: 3rd (men); 2nd (women)
- Category: ATP Challenger Tour; ITF Women's World Tennis Tour
- Prize money: $162,480 (men) $60,000 (women)
- Surface: Hard
- Location: Jinan, China

Champions

Men's singles
- (China) Zhang Zhizhen

Women's singles
- (China) You Xiaodi

Men's doubles
- (Australia) Matthew Ebden / (India) Divij Sharan

Women's doubles
- (China) Yuan Yue / (China) Zheng Wushuang
← 2018 ·	Jinan International Open	· 2024 →

The 2019 Jinan International Open was a professional tennis tournament played on outdoor hard courts. It was the third (men) and second (women) editions of the tournament which was part of the 2019 ATP Challenger Tour and the 2019 ITF Women's World Tennis Tour. It took place in Jinan, China between 26 August and 8 September 2019.

== Men's singles main-draw entrants ==
=== Seeds ===
Country	Player	Rank^{1}	Seed
IND	Prajnesh Gunneswaran	88	1
KOR	Kwon Soon-woo	90	2
AUS	Matthew Ebden	110	3
AUS	James Duckworth	131	4
JPN	Tatsuma Ito	132	5
JPN	Yasutaka Uchiyama	141	6
JPN	Go Soeda	155	7
CAN	Steven Diez	175	8
SRB	Peđa Krstin	210	9
JPN	Hiroki Moriya	213	10
ESP	Enrique López Pérez	220	11
CHN	Bai Yan	222	12
CHN	Li Zhe	225	13
AUS	Max Purcell	237	14
ESP	Roberto Ortega Olmedo	242	15
AUS	Akira Santillan	243	16

- ^{1} Rankings are as of 26 August 2019.

=== Other entrants ===
The following players received wildcards into the singles main draw:

- (China) Cui Jie
- (China) Gao Xin
- (China) He Yecong
- (China) Wu Di
- (China) Zhang Zhizhen

The following player received entry into the singles main draw as an alternate:

- (China) Sun Fajing

The following players received entry from the qualifying draw:

- (United States) Evan Song
- (Japan) Renta Tokuda

The following player received entry as a lucky loser:

- (China) Jin Yuquan

== Women's singles main-draw entrants ==
=== Seeds ===
Country	Player	Rank^{1}	Seed
CHN	Lu Jiajing	189	1
CHN	Ma Shuyue	235	2
AUS	Kaylah McPhee	242	3
SRB	Jovana Jakšić	244	4
CHN	Yuan Yue	254	5
CHN	Xun Fangying	258	6
CHN	Liu Fangzhou	263	7
POL	Urszula Radwańska	283	8

- ^{1} Rankings are as of 19 August 2019.

=== Other entrants ===
The following players received wildcards into the singles main draw:

- (China) Cao Siqi
- (China) Wu Meixu
- (China) Yuan Chengyiyi
- (China) Zheng Wushuang

The following players received entry from the qualifying draw:

- (France) Lou Brouleau
- (China) Guo Hanyu
- (Japan) Erika Sema
- (United Kingdom) Eden Silva
- (Indonesia) Aldila Sutjiadi
- (China) Wang Meiling
- (Hong Kong) Wu Ho-ching
- (Slovakia) Zuzana Zlochová

== Champions ==
=== Men's singles ===
- (China) Zhang Zhizhen def. (Japan) Go Soeda 7–5, 2–6, 6–4.

=== Women's singles ===
- (China) You Xiaodi def. (Australia) Kaylah McPhee, 6–3, 7–6^{(7–5)}

=== Men's doubles ===
- (Australia) Matthew Ebden / (India) Divij Sharan def. (South Korea) Nam Ji-sung / (South Korea) Song Min-kyu 7–6^{(7–4)}, 5–7, [10–3].

=== Women's doubles ===
- (China) Yuan Yue / (China) Zheng Wushuang def. (United Kingdom) Samantha Murray / (United Kingdom) Eden Silva, 1–6, 6–4, [10–7]
