= 2025 Busan Open =

- Date: 14–20 April
- Edition: 22nd
- Surface: Hard
- Location: Busan, South Korea

Champions

Singles
- (France) Térence Atmane

Doubles
- (Japan) Rio Noguchi / (Japan) Yuta Shimizu
- Busan Open

The 2025 Busan Open was a professional tennis tournament played on hardcourts. It was the 22nd edition of the tournament which was part of the 2025 ATP Challenger Tour. It took place in Busan, South Korea between 14 and 20 April 2025.

== Singles main-draw entrants ==
=== Seeds ===
Country	Player	Rank^{1}	Seed
AUS	Adam Walton	86	1
USA	Christopher Eubanks	110	2
USA	Brandon Holt	114	3
AUS	Tristan Schoolkate	119	4
JPN	Yasutaka Uchiyama	157	5
AUS	Li Tu	174	6
JPN	James Trotter	175	7
FRA	Térence Atmane	177	8

* ^{1} Rankings as of 7 April 2025.

=== Other entrants ===
The following players received wildcards into the singles main draw:

- (South Korea) Gerard Campaña Lee
- (South Korea) Chung Hyeon
- (South Korea) Kwon Soon-woo

The following player received entry into the singles main draw using a protected ranking:

- (Australia) Jason Kubler

The following players received entry from the qualifying draw:

- (Norway) Viktor Durasovic
- (United Kingdom) Johannus Monday
- (Germany) Mats Rosenkranz
- Marat Sharipov
- (South Korea) Shin San-hui
- Ilia Simakin

== Champions ==
=== Singles ===
- (France) Térence Atmane def. (Australia) Adam Walton 6–3, 6–4.

=== Doubles ===
- (Japan) Rio Noguchi / (Japan) Yuta Shimizu def. (Chinese Taipei) Ray Ho / (Australia) Matthew Romios 7–6^{(9–7)}, 6–4.
