= 2024 Jinan Open =

Tennis tournament

- Date: 19 August – 1 September
- Edition: 4th (men); 3rd (women)
- Category: ATP Challenger Tour; ITF Women's World Tennis Tour
- Surface: Hard
- Location: Jinan, China

Champions

Men's singles
- (China) Wu Yibing

Women's singles
- (China) Zheng Wushuang

Men's doubles
- (South Korea) Chung Yun-seong / (Japan) Yuta Shimizu

Women's doubles
- (China) Guo Meiqi / (China) Xiao Zhenghua
← 2019 ·	Jinan Open	· 2025 →

The 2024 Jinan Open was a professional tennis tournament played on outdoor hard courts. It was the fourth edition of the tournament which was part of the 2024 ATP Challenger Tour and the third edition of the tournament which was part of the 2024 ITF Women's World Tennis Tour. It took place in Jinan, China between 19 August and 1 September 2024.

== Men's singles main-draw entrants ==
=== Seeds ===
Country	Player	Rank^{1}	Seed
JPN	Yuta Shimizu	262	1
CHN	Bai Yan	277	2
GBR	Ryan Peniston	291	3
TPE	Wu Tung-lin	334	4
JPN	Rio Noguchi	338	5
CHN	Cui Jie	353	6
	Mikalai Haliak	379	7
JPN	Kaichi Uchida	382	8

- ^{1} Rankings are as of 12 August 2024.

=== Other entrants ===
The following players received wildcards into the singles main draw:

- (China) Jin Yuquan
- (China) Wu Yibing
- (China) Xiao Linang

The following player received entry into the singles main draw as an alternate:

- (New Zealand) Ajeet Rai

The following players received entry from the qualifying draw:

- (Australia) Jacob Bradshaw
- (China) Mo Yecong
- (South Korea) Nam Ji-sung
- (South Korea) Shin San-hui
- (South Korea) Shin Woo-bin
- (United States) Keegan Smith

== Women's singles main-draw entrants ==
=== Seeds ===
Country	Player	Rank^{1}	Seed
CHN	Lu Jiajing	271	1
TPE	Liang En-shuo	280	2
CHN	Shi Han	286	3
JPN	Kyōka Okamura	291	4
CHN	Yao Xinxin	312	5
CHN	Liu Fangzhou	317	6
USA	Hina Inoue	324	7
THA	Thasaporn Naklo	345	8

- ^{1} Rankings are as of 19 August 2024.

=== Other entrants ===
The following players received wildcards into the singles main draw:

- (China) Guo Meiqi
- (China) Tian Jialin
- (China) Xun Fangying

The following players received entry from the qualifying draw:

- (China) Chen Mengyi
- (Chinese Taipei) Cho Yi-tsen
- (India) Riya Bhatia
- (Japan) Mana Kawamura
- (Indonesia) Priska Madelyn Nugroho
- Ekaterina Shalimova
- (China) Tang Qianhui
- (China) Zhang Ruien

== Champions ==
=== Men's singles ===
- (China) Wu Yibing def. (Japan) Rio Noguchi 7–5, 6–3.

=== Men's doubles ===
- (South Korea) Chung Yun-seong / (Japan) Yuta Shimizu def. (Japan) Rio Noguchi / (Australia) Edward Winter 6–3, 6–7^{(5–7)}, [10–6].

=== Women's singles ===
- (China) Zheng Wushuang def. (China) Yao Xinxin, 6–2, 6–2

=== Women's doubles ===
- (China) Guo Meiqi / (China) Xiao Zhenghua def. (China) Feng Shuo / (China) Liu Fangzhou, 6–3, 1–6, [10–5]
