= 2019 Jinan International Open – Men's singles =

Men's singles
- 2019 Jinan International Open

Final
- Champion: (China) Zhang Zhizhen
- Runner-up: (Japan) Go Soeda
- Score: 7–5, 2–6, 6–4

Events
Singles	men	women
Doubles	men	women
- Jinan International Open

Alexei Popyrin was the defending champion but chose not to defend his title.

Zhang Zhizhen won the title after defeating Go Soeda 7–5, 2–6, 6–4 in the final.

== Seeds ==
All seeds receive a bye into the second round.

1. (India) Prajnesh Gunneswaran (quarterfinals)
2. (South Korea) Kwon Soon-woo (semifinals)
3. (Australia) Matthew Ebden (second round)
4. (Australia) James Duckworth (third round)
5. (Japan) Tatsuma Ito (third round)
6. (Japan) Yasutaka Uchiyama (second round)
7. (Japan) Go Soeda (final)
8. (Canada) Steven Diez (second round)
9. (Serbia) Peđa Krstin (second round)
10. (Japan) Hiroki Moriya (second round)
11. (Spain) Enrique López Pérez (semifinals)
12. (China) Bai Yan (second round)
13. (China) Li Zhe (quarterfinals)
14. (Australia) Max Purcell (quarterfinals)
15. (Spain) Roberto Ortega Olmedo (second round)
16. (Australia) Akira Santillan (third round)

== Draw ==
Key

- Q = Qualifier
- WC = Wild card
- LL = Lucky loser
- Alt = Alternate
- ITF = ITF entry
- PR = Protected ranking
- SR = Special ranking
- SE = Special exempt
- JE = Junior exempt
- JR = Junior Accelerator Programme entrant
- CO = College Accelerator Programme entrant
- NG = Next Gen Accelerator Program entrant
- w/o = Walkover
- r = Retired
- d = Defaulted

=== Finals ===
Quarterfinals
1	(India) Prajnesh Gunneswaran	6^{2}	6	3
7	(Japan) Go Soeda	7^{7}	3	6
13	(China) Li Zhe	3	7^{7}	3
11	(Spain) Enrique López Pérez	6	6^{5}	6
WC	(China) Zhang Zhizhen	7^{7}	6
14	(Australia) Max Purcell	6^{3}	1
(Russia) Teymuraz Gabashvili	6	3	4
2	(South Korea) Kwon Soon-woo	3	6	6

Semifinals
7	(Japan) Go Soeda	4	7^{7}	6
11	(Spain) Enrique López Pérez	6	6^{3}	2
WC	(China) Zhang Zhizhen	6	6
2	(South Korea) Kwon Soon-woo	4	3

Final
7	(Japan) Go Soeda	5	6	4
WC	(China) Zhang Zhizhen	7	2	6

=== Top half ===
==== Section 1 ====
First round
(France) TK Wang	6	5	3
Q	(Japan) Renta Tokuda	3	7	6
(Chinese Taipei) T-l Wu	6	6
(Australia) L Saville	3	1
WC	(China) D Wu	6	6
(United States) C Altamirano	4	4
(Netherlands) I Sijsling	3	2
(Portugal) G Oliveira	6	6

Second round
1	(India) P Gunneswaran	6	6
Q	(Japan) R Tokuda	2	2
(Chinese Taipei) T-l Wu	5	6	7
15	(Spain) R Ortega Olmedo	7	2	5
10	(Japan) H Moriya	3	5
WC	(China) D Wu	6	7
(Portugal) G Oliveira	3	0^{r}
7	(Japan) G Soeda	6	1

Third round
1	(India) P Gunneswaran	6	7^{7}
(Chinese Taipei) T-l Wu	4	6^{3}
WC	(China) D Wu	2	1
7	(Japan) G Soeda	6	6

Quarterfinals
1	(India) P Gunneswaran	6^{2}	6	3
7	(Japan) G Soeda	7^{7}	3	6

==== Section 2 ====
First round
(China) Ze Zhang	6	6
Alt	(China) F Sun	3	4
(Russia) I Nedelko	4	7	6
(South Korea) J-s Nam	6	5	3
(South Korea) Y-s Chung	2	4
(Japan) K Uchida	6	6
(Australia) A Vukic	3	6	3
(United Kingdom) J Ward	6	3	6

Second round
4	(Australia) J Duckworth	6	6
(China) Ze Zhang	1	4
(Russia) I Nedelko	6^{6}	6^{7}
13	(China) Z Li	7^{8}	7^{9}
11	(Spain) E López Pérez	7^{7}	6
(Japan) K Uchida	6^{4}	3
(United Kingdom) J Ward	4	7^{7}	6
6	(Japan) Y Uchiyama	6	6^{4}	0

Third round
4	(Australia) J Duckworth	6^{3}	3
13	(China) Z Li	7^{7}	6
11	(Spain) E López Pérez	7^{7}	6
(United Kingdom) J Ward	6^{4}	3

Quarterfinals
13	(China) Z Li	3	7^{7}	3
11	(Spain) E López Pérez	6	6^{5}	6

=== Bottom half ===
==== Section 3 ====
First round
WC	(China) Zh Zhang	2	6	6
WC	(China) J Cui	6	3	3
(Japan) Shintaro Imai	5	6	2
(Chinese Taipei) C-h Tseng	7	4	6
Q	(United States) Evan Song	6	6
(Australia) H Bourchier	4	3
LL	(China) Jin Yuquan	3	1
(Portugal) F Ferreira Silva	6	6

Second round
8	(Canada) S Diez	3	3
WC	(China) Zh Zhang	6	6
(Chinese Taipei) C-h Tseng	7^{7}	7^{7}
9	(Serbia) P Krstin	6^{2}	6^{1}
14	(Australia) M Purcell	6	1	6
Q	(United States) E Song	3	6	3
(Portugal) F Ferreira Silva	6	6
3	(Australia) M Ebden	4	4

Third round
WC	(China) Zh Zhang	6	6
(Chinese Taipei) C-h Tseng	4	3
14	(Australia) M Purcell	2	6	6
(Portugal) F Ferreira Silva	6	4	3

Quarterfinals
WC	(China) Zh Zhang	7^{7}	6
14	(Australia) M Purcell	6^{3}	1

==== Section 4 ====
First round
(France) Baptiste Crepatte	6	7^{8}
(Chinese Taipei) T-h Yang	4	6^{6}
(Russia) T Gabashvili	6	5	6
(Australia) Jacob Grills	4	7	1
(India) S Mukund	3	3
(Japan) Shuichi Sekiguchi	6	6
WC	(China) Y He	6	6
WC	(China) X Gao	1	4

Second round
5	(Japan) T Ito	6	6
(France) B Crepatte	4	0
(Russia) T Gabashvili	4	6	6
12	(China) Y Bai	6	3	2
16	(Australia) A Santillan	6	6
(Japan) S Sekiguchi	1	2
WC	(China) Y He	4	2
2	(South Korea) S-w Kwon	6	6

Third round
5	(Japan) T Ito	5	3
(Russia) T Gabashvili	7	6
16	(Australia) A Santillan	6^{6}	4
2	(South Korea) S-w Kwon	7^{8}	6

Quarterfinals
(Russia) T Gabashvili	6	3	4
2	(South Korea) S-w Kwon	3	6	6
