= 2018 Jinan International Open – Women's singles =

Women's singles
- 2018 Jinan International Open

Final
- Champion: (China) Zhu Lin
- Runner-up: (China) Wang Yafan
- Score: 6–4, 6–1

Events
Singles	men	women
Doubles	men	women
Jinan International Open	· 2019 →

This was the first edition of the tournament.

Zhu Lin won the title, defeating Wang Yafan in the final, 6–4, 6–1.

== Seeds ==
1. (Thailand) Luksika Kumkhum (semifinals)
2. (China) Wang Yafan (final)
3. (China) Duan Yingying (first round, retired)
4. (China) Zhu Lin (champion)
5. (China) Liu Fangzhou (second round, retired)
6. (South Korea) Jang Su-jeong (quarterfinals)
7. (India) Ankita Raina (quarterfinals)
8. (China) Lu Jingjing (second round)

== Draw ==
=== Key ===
- Q = Qualifier
- WC = Wild card
- LL = Lucky loser
- Alt = Alternate
- SE = Special exempt
- PR = Protected ranking
- ITF = ITF entry
- JE = Junior exempt
- w/o = Walkover
- r = Retired
- d = Defaulted
- SR = Special ranking

=== Finals ===
Semifinals
1	(Thailand) Luksika Kumkhum	6	6^{3}	6^{6}
4	(China) Zhu Lin	4	7^{7}	7^{8}
(China) Xun Fangying	3	6	4
2	(China) Wang Yafan	6	4	6

Final
4	(China) Zhu Lin	6	6
2	(China) Wang Yafan	4	1

=== Top half ===
First round
1	(Thailand) L Kumkhum	6	6
(China) Y Yuan	4	1
(Japan) H Kaji	0	4
(China) Yu Zhang	6	6
Q	(Hong Kong) E Chong	5	5
(Serbia) J Jakšić	7	7
(China) A Gai	2	6	2
6	(South Korea) S-j Jang	6	4	6
4	(China) L Zhu	6	6
WC	(China) Q Zheng	0	1
Q	(China) M Wang	6	6
WC	(China) W Yu	0	2
(Japan) E Sema	2	0
(Japan) M Minokoshi	6	6
Q	(Japan) M Hontama	1	7^{8}	5
5	(China) F Liu	6	6^{6}	7

Second round
1	(Thailand) L Kumkhum	6	6
(China) Yu Zhang	4	1
(Serbia) J Jakšić	4	6	3
6	(South Korea) S-j Jang	6	0	6
4	(China) L Zhu	3	6	6
Q	(China) M Wang	6	2	2
(Japan) M Minokoshi	6	0
5	(China) F Liu	4	0^{r}

Quarterfinals
1	(Thailand) L Kumkhum	6	6
6	(South Korea) S-j Jang	2	1
4	(China) L Zhu	6	6
(Japan) M Minokoshi	1	1

Semifinals
1	(Thailand) L Kumkhum	6	6^{3}	6^{6}
4	(China) L Zhu	4	7^{7}	7^{8}

=== Bottom half ===
First round
8	(China) Jin Lu	6	6
Q	(China) Y Ma	1	1
(Japan) M Inoue	3	2
(China) F Xun	6	6
(China) H Guo	7	2	7^{7}
(Russia) A Gasanova	5	6	6^{4}
(China) X You	5
3	(China) Y Duan	5^{r}
7	(India) A Raina	7^{10}	7
(China) J Kang	6^{8}	5
(China) W Zheng	3	6^{4}
(Chinese Taipei) E-s Liang	6	7^{7}
(China) S Ma	1	6	4
(China) K Zhang	6	4	6
(China) Xin Wang	4	4
2	(China) Y Wang	6	6

Second round
8	(China) Jin Lu	6^{6}	5
(China) F Xun	7^{8}	7
(China) H Guo	5	4
(China) X You	7	6
7	(India) A Raina	3	7^{17}	6
(Chinese Taipei) E-s Liang	6	6^{15}	3
(China) K Zhang	6^{6}	1
2	(China) Y Wang	7^{8}	6

Quarterfinals
(China) F Xun	3	6	6
(China) X You	6	2	3
7	(India) A Raina	6^{2}	4
2	(China) Y Wang	7^{7}	6

Semifinals
(China) F Xun	3	6	4
2	(China) Y Wang	6	4	6
