= 2022 BNP Paribas Primrose Bordeaux – Singles =

Singles
- 2022 BNP Paribas Primrose Bordeaux

Final
- Champion: (Australia) Alexei Popyrin
- Runner-up: (France) Quentin Halys
- Score: 2–6, 7–6^{(7–5)}, 7–6^{(7–4)}

Events
Singles	Doubles
← 2019 ·	BNP Paribas Primrose Bordeaux	· 2023 →

Lucas Pouille was the defending champion but lost in the first round to Martín Cuevas.

Alexei Popyrin won the title after defeating Quentin Halys 2–6, 7–6^{(7–5)}, 7–6^{(7–4)} in the final.

== Seeds ==
1. (France) Hugo Gaston (first round)
2. (France) Benjamin Bonzi (quarterfinals)
3. (France) Richard Gasquet (first round)
4. (Spain) Carlos Taberner (second round)
5. (Spain) Jaume Munar (quarterfinals)
6. (France) Quentin Halys (final)
7. (Brazil) Thiago Monteiro (first round)
8. (Peru) Juan Pablo Varillas (withdrew)

== Draw ==
=== Key ===
- Q = Qualifier
- WC = Wild card
- LL = Lucky loser
- Alt = Alternate
- SE = Special exempt
- PR = Protected ranking
- ITF = ITF entry
- JE = Junior exempt
- w/o = Walkover
- r = Retired
- d = Defaulted
- SR = Special ranking

=== Finals ===
Semifinals
6	(France) Quentin Halys	6^{10}	6	7^{7}
SE	Pavel Kotov	7^{12}	2	6^{3}
(Australia) Alexei Popyrin	6	3	6
Q	(Italy) Andrea Pellegrino	1	6	3

Final
6	(France) Quentin Halys	6	6^{5}	6^{4}
(Australia) Alexei Popyrin	2	7^{7}	7^{7}

=== Top half ===
First round
1	(France) H Gaston	2	2
(Spain) F Verdasco	6	6
(Uruguay) P Cuevas	6	6
WC	(France) A Fils	4	0
Q	(France) C Hemery	7^{7}	3	6^{4}
(United States) J Sock	6^{5}	6	7^{7}
WC	(France) H Grenier	5	4
6	(France) Q Halys	7	6
3	(France) R Gasquet	6	3	6^{6}
(United States) C Eubanks	4	6	7^{8}
(Portugal) G Elias	4	6	5
(Sweden) E Ymer	6	3	7
Q	(Brazil) J Menezes	2	1
(Japan) T Daniel	6	6
SE	P Kotov	6^{1}	6	7^{8}
7	(Brazil) T Monteiro	7^{7}	3	6^{6}

Second round
(Spain) F Verdasco	3	0
(Uruguay) P Cuevas	6	6
(United States) J Sock	2	1^{r}
6	(France) Q Halys	6	3
(United States) C Eubanks	2	4
(Sweden) E Ymer	6	6
(Japan) T Daniel	5	6	3
SE	P Kotov	7	3	6

Quarterfinals
(Uruguay) P Cuevas	7	6^{4}	4
6	(France) Q Halys	5	7^{7}	6
(Sweden) E Ymer	6^{2}	3
SE	P Kotov	7^{7}	6

Semifinals
6	(France) Q Halys	6^{10}	6	7^{7}
SE	P Kotov	7^{12}	2	6^{3}

=== Bottom half ===
First round
5	(Spain) J Munar	6	6
(United States) S Kozlov	2	3
(France) P-H Herbert	6	6^{3}	4
Q	(Morocco) E Benchetrit	3	7^{7}	6
(Australia) A Popyrin	7^{7}	6
LL	(Belgium) K Coppejans	6^{4}	3
(United Kingdom) L Broady	5	2
4	(Spain) C Taberner	7	6
LL	(India) R Ramanathan	4	4
Q	(Italy) A Pellegrino	6	6
Q	(Portugal) P Sousa	3	6^{7}
(Portugal) N Borges	6	7^{9}
Q	(Uruguay) M Cuevas	4	6	7^{7}
WC	(France) L Pouille	6	3	6^{5}
SE	(France) G Barrère	1	6	5
2	(France) B Bonzi	6	3	7

Second round
5	(Spain) J Munar	6	6
Q	(Morocco) E Benchetrit	3	1
(Australia) A Popyrin	6	3	6
4	(Spain) C Taberner	3	6	3
Q	(Italy) A Pellegrino	6	6
(Portugal) N Borges	2	2
Q	(Uruguay) M Cuevas	3	3
2	(France) B Bonzi	6	6

Quarterfinals
5	(Spain) J Munar	7^{7}	5	4
(Australia) A Popyrin	6^{5}	7	6
Q	(Italy) A Pellegrino	3	6	6
2	(France) B Bonzi	6	3	4

Semifinals
(Australia) A Popyrin	6	3	6
Q	(Italy) A Pellegrino	1	6	3
