= 2018 Jinan International Open =

- Date: 6–12 August
- Edition: 2nd (ATP); 1st (ITF)
- Category: ATP Challenger Tour; ITF Women's Circuit
- Prize money: $150,000 (ATP) $60,000 (ITF)
- Surface: Hard
- Location: Jinan, China

Champions

Men's singles
- (Australia) Alexei Popyrin

Women's singles
- (China) Zhu Lin

Men's doubles
- (Chinese Taipei) Hsieh Cheng-peng / (Chinese Taipei) Yang Tsung-hua

Women's doubles
- (China) Wang Xinyu / (China) You Xiaodi
← 2017 ·	Jinan International Open	· 2019 →

The 2018 Jinan International Open was a professional tennis tournament played on outdoor hard courts. It was the second (ATP) and first (ITF) editions of the tournament and was part of the 2018 ATP Challenger Tour and the 2018 ITF Women's Circuit. It took place in Jinan, China, on 6–12 August 2018.

== Men's singles main draw entrants ==
=== Seeds ===
Country	Player	Rank^{1}	Seed
IND	Ramkumar Ramanathan	111	1
~~SUI~~	~~Henri Laaksonen~~	~~137~~	~~2~~
SRB	Nikola Milojević	161	3
KAZ	Alexander Bublik	169	4
JPN	Tatsuma Ito	182	5
JPN	Hiroki Moriya	202	6
SRB	Peđa Krstin	207	7
TPE	Yang Tsung-hua	211	8

- ^{1} Rankings are as of 30 July 2018.

=== Other entrants ===
The following players received wildcards into the singles main draw:

- (China) Gao Xin
- (China) He Yecong
- (China) Xia Zihao
- (China) Zhang Zhizhen

The following players received entry from the qualifying draw:

- (China) Bai Yan
- (Australia) Alexei Popyrin
- (India) Manish Sureshkumar
- (France) Tak Khunn Wang

The following player received entry as a lucky loser:

- (Chinese Taipei) Wu Tung-lin

== Women's singles main draw entrants ==
=== Seeds ===
Country	Player	Rank^{1}	Seed
THA	Luksika Kumkhum	89	1
CHN	Wang Yafan	93	2
CHN	Duan Yingying	111	3
CHN	Zhu Lin	132	4
CHN	Liu Fangzhou	137	5
KOR	Jang Su-jeong	190	6
IND	Ankita Raina	195	7
CHN	Lu Jingjing	211	8

- ^{1} Rankings as of 30 July 2018.

=== Other entrants ===
The following players received a wildcard into the singles main draw:

- (China) Yu Wenjun
- (China) Zheng Qinwen

The following players received entry from the qualifying draw:

- (Hong Kong) Eudice Chong
- (Japan) Mai Hontama
- (China) Ma Yexin
- (China) Wang Meiling

== Champions ==
=== Men's singles ===
- (Australia) Alexei Popyrin def. (United Kingdom) James Ward 3–6, 6–1, 7–5.

=== Women's singles ===
- (China) Zhu Lin def. (China) Wang Yafan, 6–4, 6–1

=== Men's doubles ===
- (Chinese Taipei) Hsieh Cheng-peng / (Chinese Taipei) Yang Tsung-hua def. (Kazakhstan) Alexander Bublik / (Russia) Alexander Pavlioutchenkov 7–6^{(7–5)}, 4–6, [10–5].

=== Women's doubles ===
- (China) Wang Xinyu / (China) You Xiaodi def. (Chinese Taipei) Hsieh Shu-ying / (China) Lu Jingjing, 6–3, 6–7^{(5–7)}, [10–2]
