= 2019 Jinan International Open – Women's singles =

Women's singles
- 2019 Jinan International Open

Final
- Champion: (China) You Xiaodi
- Runner-up: (Australia) Kaylah McPhee
- Score: 6–3, 7–6^{(7–5)}

Events
Singles	men	women
Doubles	men	women
← 2018 ·	Jinan International Open	· 2020 →

Zhu Lin was the defending champion, but chose to participate at the 2019 US Open instead.

You Xiaodi won the title, defeating Kaylah McPhee in the final, 6–3, 7–6^{(7–5)}.

== Seeds ==
1. (China) Lu Jiajing (second round)
2. (China) Ma Shuyue (second round, retired)
3. (Australia) Kaylah McPhee (final)
4. (Serbia) Jovana Jakšić (semifinals)
5. (China) Yuan Yue (second round)
6. (China) Xun Fangying (first round)
7. (China) Liu Fangzhou (first round)
8. (Poland) Urszula Radwańska (first round)

== Draw ==
=== Key ===
- Q = Qualifier
- WC = Wild card
- LL = Lucky loser
- Alt = Alternate
- SE = Special exempt
- PR = Protected ranking
- ITF = ITF entry
- JE = Junior exempt
- w/o = Walkover
- r = Retired
- d = Defaulted
- SR = Special ranking

=== Finals ===
Semifinals
(China) You Xiaodi	1	7^{7}	7
4	(Serbia) Jovana Jakšić	6	6^{5}	5
3	(Australia) Kaylah McPhee	7^{7}	3	6
(Japan) Chihiro Muramatsu	6^{5}	6	1

Final
(China) You Xiaodi	6	7^{7}
3	(Australia) Kaylah McPhee	3	6^{5}

=== Top half ===
First round
1	(China) Jia Lu	6	6
Q	(Hong Kong) H-c Wu	1	5
WC	(China) C Yuan	3	1
(China) X You	6	6
Q	(China) H Guo	7	6
(South Korea) S-j Jang	5	4
(Bulgaria) A Naydenova	6	3	6
6	(China) F Xun	2	6	2
4	(Serbia) J Jakšić	6	7^{7}
(United Kingdom) S Murray	2	6^{3}
(Thailand) P Plipuech	5	5
(Japan) M Hontama	7	7
Q	(United Kingdom) E Silva	5	7	1
WC	(China) W Zheng	7	5	6
Q	(Japan) E Sema	2	6^{5}
5	(China) Y Yuan	6	7^{7}

Second round
1	(China) Jia Lu	2	3
(China) X You	6	6
Q	(China) H Guo	3	6	2
(Bulgaria) A Naydenova	6	4	6
4	(Serbia) J Jakšić	6	6
(Japan) M Hontama	3	3
WC	(China) W Zheng	3	6	6
5	(China) Y Yuan	6	3	2

Quarterfinals
(China) X You	5	7	6
(Bulgaria) A Naydenova	7	5	4
4	(Serbia) J Jakšić	6	3	6
WC	(China) W Zheng	4	6	3

Semifinals
(China) X You	1	7^{7}	7
4	(Serbia) J Jakšić	6	6^{5}	5

=== Bottom half ===
First round
7	(China) F Liu	6^{6}	2
(Belarus) Y Hatouka	7^{8}	6
WC	(China) S Cao	4	6	1
WC	(China) M Wu	6	4	6
(Thailand) N Luangnam	6	1	7^{7}
(China) Yu Zhang	4	6	6^{5}
(Japan) R Ozaki	6	1	5
3	(Australia) K McPhee	4	6	7
8	(Poland) U Radwańska	3	7^{9}	3
Q	(China) M Wang	6	6^{7}	6
Q	(France) L Brouleau	3	2
(Japan) C Muramatsu	6	6
(South Korea) D-b Kim	6	3	0
Q	(Indonesia) A Sutjiadi	2	6	6
Q	(Slovakia) Z Zlochová	6	5	4
2	(China) S Ma	1	7	6

Second round
(Belarus) Y Hatouka	2	2
WC	(China) M Wu	6	6
(Thailand) N Luangnam	0	0
3	(Australia) K McPhee	6	6
Q	(China) M Wang	2	1
(Japan) C Muramatsu	6	6
Q	(Indonesia) A Sutjiadi	3	6	3
2	(China) S Ma	6	1	0^{r}

Quarterfinals
WC	(China) M Wu	1	2
3	(Australia) K McPhee	6	6
(Japan) C Muramatsu	6	6
Q	(Indonesia) A Sutjiadi	4	2

Semifinals
3	(Australia) K McPhee	7^{7}	3	6
(Japan) C Muramatsu	6^{5}	6	1
