= 2022 BNP Paribas Primrose Bordeaux – Doubles =

Doubles
- 2022 BNP Paribas Primrose Bordeaux

Final
- Champions: (Brazil) Rafael Matos (Spain) David Vega Hernández
- Runners-up: (Monaco) Hugo Nys (Poland) Jan Zieliński
- Score: 6–4, 6–0

Events
Singles	Doubles
← 2019 ·	BNP Paribas Primrose Bordeaux	· 2023 →

Grégoire Barrère and Quentin Halys were the defending champions but chose not to defend their title.

Rafael Matos and David Vega Hernández won the title after defeating Hugo Nys and Jan Zieliński 6–4, 6–0 in the final.

== Seeds ==
1. (Brazil) Rafael Matos / (Spain) David Vega Hernández (champions)
2. (Monaco) Hugo Nys / (Poland) Jan Zieliński (final)
3. (Mexico) Hans Hach Verdugo / (Austria) Philipp Oswald (semifinals)
4. (Sweden) André Göransson / (United States) Nathaniel Lammons (semifinals)

== Draw ==
=== Key ===
- Q = Qualifier
- WC = Wild card
- LL = Lucky loser
- Alt = Alternate
- SE = Special exempt
- PR = Protected ranking
- ITF = ITF entry
- JE = Junior exempt
- w/o = Walkover
- r = Retired
- d = Defaulted
- SR = Special ranking

First round
1	(Brazil) R Matos (Spain) D Vega Hernández	1	6	[10]
(France) J Eysseric (France) L Pouille	6	3	[6]
(Monaco) R Arneodo (Poland) S Walków	4	6	[5]
(Switzerland) L Margaroli (United States) M Schnur	6	2	[10]
4	(Sweden) A Göransson (United States) N Lammons	6	6
(Italy) A Giannessi (Spain) C Taberner	3	4
WC	(France) A Fils (France) G Mpetshi Perricard	4	4
(France) H Gaston (France) A Olivetti	6	6
(India) D Sharan (New Zealand) A Sitak	4	4
(United States) N Monroe (Brazil) F Romboli	6	6
PR	(Portugal) G Elias (Portugal) P Sousa	6^{6}	4
3	(Mexico) H Hach Verdugo (Austria) P Oswald	7^{8}	6
(France) S Doumbia (France) F Reboul	6	6
WC	(France) G Debru (France) Pierre Delage	4	4
Alt	(Uruguay) M Cuevas (Uruguay) P Cuevas	3	6^{2}
2	(Monaco) H Nys (Poland) J Zieliński	6	7^{7}

Quarterfinals
1	(Brazil) R Matos (Spain) D Vega Hernández	2	6	[10]
(Switzerland) L Margaroli (United States) M Schnur	6	2	[8]
4	(Sweden) A Göransson (United States) N Lammons	6	6
(France) H Gaston (France) A Olivetti	4	4
(United States) N Monroe (Brazil) F Romboli	6	3	[4]
3	(Mexico) H Hach Verdugo (Austria) P Oswald	4	6	[10]
(France) S Doumbia (France) F Reboul	5	3
2	(Monaco) H Nys (Poland) J Zieliński	7	6

Semifinals
1	(Brazil) R Matos (Spain) D Vega Hernández	6	7^{7}
4	(Sweden) A Göransson (United States) N Lammons	4	6^{4}
3	(Mexico) H Hach Verdugo (Austria) P Oswald	3	2
2	(Monaco) H Nys (Poland) J Zieliński	6	6

Final
1	(Brazil) R Matos (Spain) D Vega Hernández	6	6
2	(Monaco) H Nys (Poland) J Zieliński	4	0
