= 2025 Busan Open – Doubles =

Doubles
- 2025 Busan Open

Final
- Champions: (Japan) Rio Noguchi (Japan) Yuta Shimizu
- Runners-up: (Chinese Taipei) Ray Ho (Australia) Matthew Romios
- Score: 7–6^{(9–7)}, 6–4

Events
Singles	Doubles
← 2024 ·	Busan Open	· 2026 →

Ray Ho and Nam Ji-sung were the defending champions but chose to defend their title with different partners. Ho partnered Matthew Romios but lost in the final to Rio Noguchi and Yuta Shimizu. Nam partnered Kaito Uesugi but lost in the quarterfinals to Kody Pearson and Adam Walton.

Noguchi and Shimizu won the title after defeating Ho and Romios 7–6^{(9–7)}, 6–4 in the final.

== Seeds ==
1. (Chinese Taipei) Ray Ho / (Australia) Matthew Romios (final)
2. (United States) Vasil Kirkov / (Netherlands) Bart Stevens (first round)
3. (Australia) Blake Bayldon / (United States) Reese Stalder (first round)
4. (Israel) Daniel Cukierman / (United Kingdom) Joshua Paris (first round)

== Draw ==
Key

- Q = Qualifier
- WC = Wild card
- LL = Lucky loser
- Alt = Alternate
- ITF = ITF entry
- PR = Protected ranking
- SR = Special ranking
- SE = Special exempt
- JE = Junior exempt
- JR = Junior Accelerator Programme entrant
- CO = College Accelerator Programme entrant
- NG = Next Gen Accelerator Program entrant
- w/o = Walkover
- r = Retired
- d = Defaulted

=== Draw ===
First round
1	(Chinese Taipei) R Ho (Australia) MC Romios	7^{7}	6
PR	(Australia) A Bolt (Australia) J Kubler	6^{3}	0
WC	(South Korea) Y-s Chung (South Korea) U-s Park	6^{6}	3
WC	(South Korea) Ann Suk (South Korea) J-m Lee	7^{8}	6
3	(Australia) B Bayldon (United States) R Stalder	6	0	[7]
(Chinese Taipei) Y-h Hsu (Japan) S Shimabukuro	2	6	[10]
(Japan) Y Uchiyama (Japan) Y Watanuki	6	6
(France) A Escoffier (France) L Sanchez	0	2
(Australia) K Pearson (Australia) A Walton	7^{7}	4	[12]
(Australia) Ja Delaney (Australia) T Schoolkate	6^{5}	6	[10]
(South Korea) J-s Nam (Japan) K Uesugi	7^{7}	6
4	(Israel) D Cukierman (United Kingdom) J Paris	6^{2}	4
(China) F Sun (Japan) K Uchida	1	6	[7]
(India) R Ramanathan (China) A Wang	6	2	[10]
(Japan) R Noguchi (Japan) Y Shimizu	7^{7}	6
2	(United States) V Kirkov (Netherlands) B Stevens	6^{3}	3

Quarterfinals
1	(Chinese Taipei) R Ho (Australia) MC Romios	7	6
WC	(South Korea) S Ann (South Korea) J-m Lee	5	3
(Chinese Taipei) Y-h Hsu (Japan) S Shimabukuro	w/o
(Japan) Y Uchiyama (Japan) Y Watanuki
(Australia) K Pearson (Australia) A Walton	2	7^{7}	[10]
(South Korea) J-s Nam (Japan) K Uesugi	6	6^{4}	[8]
(India) R Ramanathan (China) A Wang	3	5
(Japan) R Noguchi (Japan) Y Shimizu	6	7

Semifinals
1	(Chinese Taipei) R Ho (Australia) MC Romios	6	6
(Chinese Taipei) Y-h Hsu (Japan) S Shimabukuro	4	4
(Australia) K Pearson (Australia) A Walton	5	6	[6]
(Japan) R Noguchi (Japan) Y Shimizu	7	3	[10]

Final
1	(Chinese Taipei) R Ho (Australia) MC Romios	6^{7}	4
(Japan) R Noguchi (Japan) Y Shimizu	7^{9}	6
