= 2019 Jinan International Open – Men's doubles =

Men's doubles
- 2019 Jinan International Open

Final
- Champions: (Australia) Matthew Ebden (India) Divij Sharan
- Runners-up: (South Korea) Nam Ji-sung (South Korea) Song Min-kyu
- Score: 7–6^{(7–4)}, 5–7, [10–3]

Events
Singles	men	women
Doubles	men	women
- Jinan International Open

Hsieh Cheng-peng and Yang Tsung-hua were the defending champions but chose not to defend their title.

Matthew Ebden and Divij Sharan won the title after defeating Nam Ji-sung and Song Min-kyu 7–6^{(7–4)}, 5–7, [10–3] in the final.

== Seeds ==
1. (Australia) Matthew Ebden / (India) Divij Sharan (champions)
2. (Australia) Max Purcell / (Australia) Luke Saville (quarterfinals)
3. (China) Gong Maoxin / (China) Zhang Ze (first round)
4. (India) Saketh Myneni / (India) Jeevan Nedunchezhiyan (semifinals)

== Draw ==
Key

- Q = Qualifier
- WC = Wild card
- LL = Lucky loser
- Alt = Alternate
- ITF = ITF entry
- PR = Protected ranking
- SR = Special ranking
- SE = Special exempt
- JE = Junior exempt
- JR = Junior Accelerator Programme entrant
- CO = College Accelerator Programme entrant
- NG = Next Gen Accelerator Program entrant
- w/o = Walkover
- r = Retired
- d = Defaulted

First round
1	(Australia) M Ebden (India) D Sharan	6	6^{6}	[11]
(Canada) S Diez (Spain) E López Pérez	2	7^{8}	[9]
(Serbia) P Krstin (Australia) A Santillan	7	4	[10]
(United States) JP Fruttero (Chinese Taipei) T-h Yang	5	6	[5]
4	(India) S Myneni (India) J Nedunchezhiyan	6	6
(Japan) Shintaro Imai (Japan) T Matsui	4	3
(India) S Balaji (India) V Vardhan	6	6^{2}	[7]
(Japan) H Moriya (Portugal) G Oliveira	3	7^{7}	[10]
WC	(China) Jin Yuquan (China) Li Zekai	2	2
(China) Y Bai (Russia) T Gabashvili	6	6
WC	(China) X Gao (China) R Hua	7^{7}	1	[10]
3	(China) M Gong (China) Ze Zhang	6^{5}	6	[5]
(South Korea) J-s Nam (South Korea) M-k Song	5	6	[10]
(Thailand) Sa Ratiwatana (Thailand) So Ratiwatana	7	2	[8]
WC	(China) F Sun (China) D Wu	6^{6}	2
2	(Australia) M Purcell (Australia) L Saville	7^{8}	6

Quarterfinals
1	(Australia) M Ebden (India) D Sharan	6	6
(Serbia) P Krstin (Australia) A Santillan	1	4
4	(India) S Myneni (India) J Nedunchezhiyan	7	6
(Japan) H Moriya (Portugal) G Oliveira	5	2
(China) Y Bai (Russia) T Gabashvili	1	3
WC	(China) X Gao (China) R Hua	6	6
(South Korea) J-s Nam (South Korea) M-k Song	6	6
2	(Australia) M Purcell (Australia) L Saville	4	2

Semifinals
1	(Australia) M Ebden (India) D Sharan	6	6
4	(India) S Myneni (India) J Nedunchezhiyan	4	2
WC	(China) X Gao (China) R Hua	2	2
(South Korea) J-s Nam (South Korea) M-k Song	6	6

Final
1	(Australia) M Ebden (India) D Sharan	7^{7}	5	[10]
(South Korea) J-s Nam (South Korea) M-k Song	6^{4}	7	[3]
