= 2018 Jinan International Open – Women's doubles =

Women's doubles
- 2018 Jinan International Open

Final
- Champions: (China) Wang Xinyu (China) You Xiaodi
- Runners-up: (Chinese Taipei) Hsieh Shu-ying (China) Lu Jingjing
- Score: 6–3, 6–7^{(5–7)}, [10–2]

Events
| Singles | men | women |
| Doubles | men | women |
| Jinan International Open | · 2019 → |

This was the first edition of the tournament.

Wang Xinyu and You Xiaodi won the title, defeating Hsieh Shu-ying and Lu Jingjing in the final, 6–3, 6–7^{(5–7)}, [10–2].

== Seeds ==
1. (China) Jiang Xinyu / (China) Tang Qianhui (quarterfinals)
2. (China) Liang Chen / (China) Ye Qiuyu (quarterfinals)
3. (Chinese Taipei) Hsieh Shu-ying / (China) Lu Jingjing (final)
4. (South Korea) Jang Su-jeong / (Thailand) Luksika Kumkhum (semifinals)

== Draw ==
=== Key ===
- Q = Qualifier
- WC = Wild card
- LL = Lucky loser
- Alt = Alternate
- SE = Special exempt
- PR = Protected ranking
- ITF = ITF entry
- JE = Junior exempt
- w/o = Walkover
- r = Retired
- d = Defaulted
- SR = Special ranking

=== Draw ===
First round
1 | (China) X Jiang (China) Q Tang | 6^{5} | 6 | [11]
(China) S Feng (China) J Kang | 7^{7} | 2 | [9]
(China) Xin Wang (China) X You | 6 | 6
WC | (China) J Chen (China) Y Yuan | 2 | 3
4 | (South Korea) S-j Jang (Thailand) L Kumkhum | 7 | 4 | [10]
(Serbia) J Jakšić (Japan) E Sema | 5 | 6 | [7]
(China) F Liu (China) F Xun | 3 | 4
(Hong Kong) K-y Ng (Ukraine) O Savchuk | 6 | 6
WC | (China) W Yu (China) J Zhang | 2 | 6 | [4]
(Japan) M Inoue (Japan) H Kaji | 6 | 3 | [10]
(China) Y Sheng (China) W Zheng | 4 | 6^{1}
3 | (Chinese Taipei) S-y Hsieh (China) Jin Lu | 6 | 7^{7}
(China) H Guo (China) Yi Zhang | 4 | 6^{6}
(Russia) A Gasanova (India) A Raina | 6 | 7^{8}
(Japan) M Ayukawa (Japan) M Minokoshi | 2 | 4
2 | (China) C Liang (China) Q Ye | 6 | 6

Quarterfinals
1 | (China) X Jiang (China) Q Tang | 3 | 5
(China) Xin Wang (China) X You | 6 | 7
4 | (South Korea) S-j Jang (Thailand) L Kumkhum | 7 | 7^{7}
(Hong Kong) K-y Ng (Ukraine) O Savchuk | 5 | 6^{4}
(Japan) M Inoue (Japan) H Kaji | 4 | 3
3 | (Chinese Taipei) S-y Hsieh (China) Jin Lu | 6 | 6
(Russia) A Gasanova (India) A Raina | 6^{10} | 7 | [11]
2 | (China) C Liang (China) Q Ye | 7^{12} | 5 | [9]

Semifinals
(China) Xin Wang (China) X You | 7^{7} | 7
4 | (South Korea) S-j Jang (Thailand) L Kumkhum | 6^{0} | 5
3 | (Chinese Taipei) S-y Hsieh (China) Jin Lu | 6 | 6^{5} | [10]
(Russia) A Gasanova (India) A Raina | 4 | 7^{7} | [5]

Final
(China) Xin Wang (China) X You | 6 | 6^{5} | [10]
3 | (Chinese Taipei) S-y Hsieh (China) Jin Lu | 3 | 7^{7} | [2]
