= Alexei Popyrin =

Australian tennis player (born 1999)

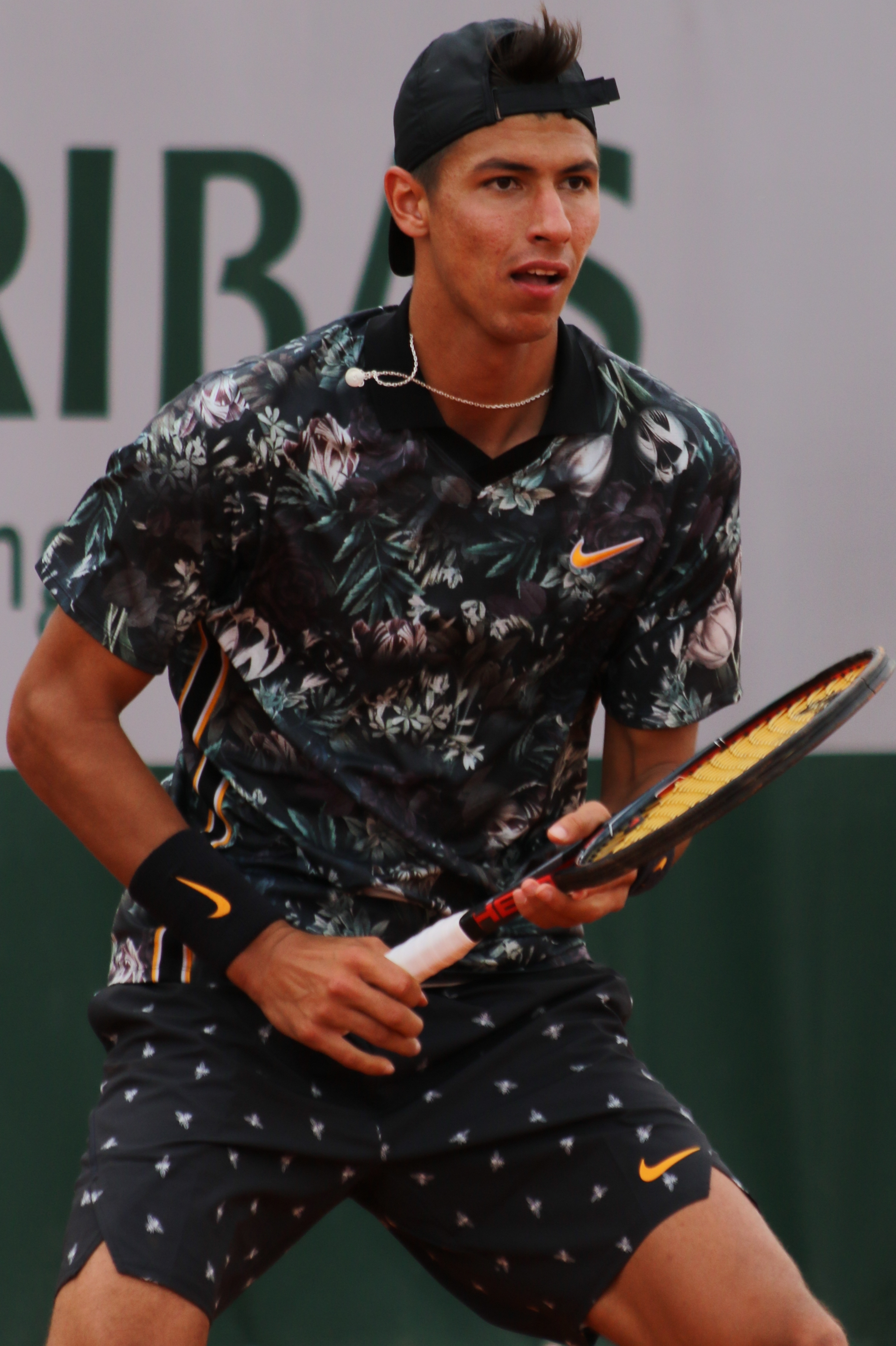
- Popyrin at the 2019 French Open
- Country (sports): Australia
- Residence: Australia
- Born: 5 August 1999 (age 27) Sydney, New South Wales, Australia
- Height: 1.96 m (6 ft 5 in)
- Turned pro: 2017
- Plays: Right-handed (two-handed backhand)
- Coach: Neville Godwin, Wayne Ferreira (2025–), Xavier Malisse (−2025)
- Prize money: US $9,839,618

Singles
- Career record: 120–153
- Career titles: 3
- Highest ranking: No. 19 (4 August 2025)
- Current ranking: No. 130 (31 August 2026)

Grand Slam singles results
- Australian Open: 3R (2019, 2020, 2023)
- French Open: 4R (2025)
- Wimbledon: 3R (2024)
- US Open: 4R (2024)

Other tournaments
- Olympic Games: 3R (2024)

Doubles
- Career record: 16–33
- Career titles: 1
- Highest ranking: No. 118 (23 February 2026)
- Current ranking: No. 588 (31 August 2026)

Grand Slam doubles results
- Australian Open: 3R (2019)
- French Open: 2R (2023)
- Wimbledon: 2R (2021)
- US Open: 1R (2021, 2022, 2023)

Other doubles tournaments
- Olympic Games: 1R (2024)

Grand Slam mixed doubles results
- Australian Open: 1R (2019)
- Last updated on: 31 August 2026.

Alexei Popyrin (Note: /əˈlɛksi ˈpɒpərɪn/ ə-LEK-see POP-ər-in) (born 5 August 1999) is an Australian professional tennis player. He has a career-high ATP singles ranking of world No. 19 achieved on 4 August 2025 and a best doubles ranking of No. 118 reached on 23 February 2026.

Popyrin has won three ATP Tour singles titles, the most significant at the 2024 Canada Open, an ATP 1000-level event. He represents Australia at the Davis Cup.

== Early life ==
Popyrin was born in Sydney, Australia to Russian immigrant parents Alex and Elena Popyrin.

Popyrin began playing tennis at the Kim Warwick Tennis Academy in Hornsby at the age of 4 and was in attendance for the historic 2008 Australian Open third round match between Lleyton Hewitt and Marcos Baghdatis. At the age of 8, Popyrin relocated to Dubai for two years due to his father's work commitments before moving to Alicante, Spain, where fellow Australian Alex de Minaur was his neighbour. Popyrin also spent time training in Nice, Marbella, and Dubai. He has trained at the Mouratoglou Tennis Academy since April 2017. His father, Alex, co-founded the Ultimate Tennis Showdown with Patrick Mouratoglou.

== Juniors ==
In 2011, Popyrin won the Australian u12s Grasscourt Championships and, with Chase Ferguson, won the u12s National Claycourt Doubles Championships. In the same year he competed in the Tennis Europe u12 circuit, winning the Stork International 12 & Under in Oetwil Am See (SUI), Torneo U12 – Porto San Giorgio in Porto San Giorgio (ITA), Torneo Citta Di Padova in Padova (ITA). Popyrin lost in the semi-finals at the Eddie Herr International Junior Tennis Championships – IMG / Bollettieri Sports Academy Bradenton, FL (USA), Passagespoirs Le Passage (FRA), as well as the final of the Campionati Internazionali BNL d'Italia U12 – Circolo Canottieri in Roma (ITA).

Popyrin started competing in ITF Junior circuit in 2013 and, in 2017, reached the semi-finals at the 2017 Australian Open in the junior doubles tournament. He then followed that up by winning 22 consecutive matches winning 4 consecutive tournaments : the Mediterranee Avenir – Club Olympic Casablancais Casablanca (MAR), Trofeo Bonfiglio – Tennis Club Milano Milan (ITA), the 2017 French Open junior singles title in May 2017 and his first ITF Professional tournament in Poland F4 Futures Mragowo (POL). While ranked number 2 in the juniors single rankings, Popyrin decided to focus on the professional circuit.

== Professional career ==
=== 2013–2018: Maiden Challenger title, top 150 ===
Popyrin entered his first ITF Futures professional tournament in October 2013 at 14 years of age where he lost a first round qualifying match to Slovak Martin Beran in Madrid. He secured his first professional qualifying win a year later in another Spanish ITF Futures tournament but failed to qualify for the main draw when he lost in the second round qualifying match. At the beginning of 2016, at the age of 16, Popyrin contested his first ATP Challenger Tour tournament after receiving a wildcard from Tennis Australia to compete in the 2016 Canberra Challenger. He was defeated in the first round by future top 10 player Diego Schwartzman.

In July 2016, he secured his first professional main draw win in an Italian ITF Futures tournament by defeating local talent Tommaso Roggero in straight sets before retiring hurt in the second round. Popyrin continued to play ITF Futures tournaments for the remainder of 2016 and ended the year with a world ranking of No. 1155. He won his first professional ITF title in July 2017 at the Poland F4 in Mragowo, Poland. This victory broke Popyrin into the top 1000 for the first time. He played several more ITF and Challenger tournaments for the remainder of 2017 and ended the year with a ranking of 622.

Popyrin started the 2018 season ranked No. 622, achieving a career-high ranking 25 times over the course of the season peaking at No.147 in November. In January 2018, he qualified for an ATP World Tour tournament for the first time at the Sydney International beating Nicolas Mahut and Federico Delbonis. He lost in round one to John Millman. Later in January, Popyrin made his Grand Slam debut at the 2018 Australian Open after being awarded a wildcard. He lost in round 1 to Tim Smyczek. Popyrin spent the next six months in Europe playing in challenger tournaments, increasing his ranking.

In August 2018, Popyrin qualified for and won his first Challenger title at the Jinan International in China beating James Ward in the final, becoming the third youngest teenager in 2018 to win a professional Challenger title. Popyrin continued to perform well and broke into the world's top 200 in late August. In October, Popyrin qualified for his second ATP World Tour main draw at the Stockholm Open, where he again lost to John Millman in round one. The following week, Popyrin again qualified for a main draw, this time at Swiss Indoors beating Benoit Paire and Mackenzie McDonald. He defeated compatriot Matthew Ebden for his first ATP World Tour win. Popyrin ended 2018 with a singles rank of No. 147.

=== 2019–2020: First major win, top 100 debut ===
Popyrin commenced 2019 with wildcards into the Brisbane International and Sydney International, losing in the first round in both. He also received a wildcard in the Australian Open, and achieved his first Grand Slam win by defeating Mischa Zverev in straight sets. Popyrin followed this up by beating Dominic Thiem and lost in the third round to Lucas Pouille in closely contested five sets.

During the first half of 2019 Popyrin qualified for the main draws of the ATP 250 tournaments in New York and Estoril, ATP 500 in Acapulco and Masters 1000 in Indian Wells and Monte Carlo. Following his success on the ATP tour, Popyrin was awarded a main draw wildcard into French Open. In the first round Popyrin defeated France's Ugo Humbert in four sets winning his first Roland Garros men's main draw match. He lost to Laslo Djere in the second round. He broke into ATP top 100 for the first time at World No. 99 on 24 June 2019.

In July 2019 Popyrin qualified for the main draw of the 2019 Wimbledon Championships Popyrin lost to Daniil Medvedev in the second round. In the same month, Popyrin received his first direct acceptance into ATP 250 tournament in Atlanta, where he lost in the quarterfinals.

2019 was a breakout year for Popyrin. He played at least second round in all four Grand Slams – 3rd round of Australia Open, 2nd Round of Roland Garros, 2nd Round of Wimbledon and 3rd Round in US Open losing in four closely contested sets to Matteo Berrettini. In 2019 Popyrin qualified for 10 Professional tournaments tying the record set by Mischa Zverev in 2016.

The Australian ended 2019 with an ATP singles rank of world No. 97.

=== 2021: First ATP title ===
Popyrin received a third wildcard into the main draw of the 2021 Australian Open similar to every year since 2018, with the exception of the 2020 Australian Open where he entered the main draw as direct entry. In the first round he defeated 13 seed David Goffin after saving four match points in 3 hours 43 minutes. He then lost in the second round to Lloyd Harris.

In February, Popyrin entered the Singapore Open and defeated Marin Čilić in the semi-final and Alexander Bublik in the final to win his first ATP title and achieved a career high singles ranking of 82.

At the 2021 French Open, Popyrin lost to Rafael Nadal in the first round.

At the US Open, Popyrin matched his career-best result, progressing through to the third round, which included a win over Grigor Dimitrov, Popyrin's fourth career top-20 win and third achieved in 2021.

Popyrin ended 2021 with an ATP singles ranking of world No. 61.

=== 2022: Second Challenger title, out of top 100 ===
Popyrin started his 2022 season at the Melbourne Summer Set 1. He lost in the second round to Tallon Griekspoor. In Sydney, he was defeated in the first round by Pedro Martínez. At the Australian Open, he lost in the first round to Arthur Rinderknech in five sets.

After the Australian Open, Popyrin competed at the Open Sud de France. He lost in the first round to fifth seed Filip Krajinović. In Rotterdam, he lost in the first round to Karen Khachanov. Seeded seventh at the Open 13 Provence, he was defeated in the first round by qualifier Roman Safiullin. At the Dubai Championships, he fell in the final round of qualifying to Jiří Veselý. However, due to Félix Auger-Aliassime withdrawing from the tournament due to a back injury, Popyrin entered the main draw as a lucky loser. He beat world No. 19, Nikoloz Basilashvili, in the first round. He lost in the second round to qualifier Ričardas Berankis. In March, he played at the BNP Paribas Open. He was defeated in the first round by qualifier Tomáš Macháč. At the Arizona Classic, he lost in the first round to second seed Lorenzo Musetti. In Miami, he was defeated in the second round by 21st seed and world No. 23, Marin Čilić.

Popyrin started his clay-court season at the Barcelona Open. He fell in the first round of qualifying to Andrea Pellegrino. At the Estoril Open, he lost in the first round of qualifying to Pierre-Hugues Herbert. Making it through qualifying at the Open du Pays d'Aix, he was defeated in the first round by fifth seed Pablo Cuevas. Popyrin won his second ATP Challenger Tour title at the BNP Paribas Primrose Bordeaux with a win over sixth seed Quentin Halys in the final.

=== 2023: Cincinnati quarterfinals, top 10 win ===
Popyrin started his season at the Adelaide International 1. After making it past qualifying, he upset second seed and world No. 6 Félix Auger-Aliassime, in the first round in straight sets. He went on to reach the quarterfinals where he lost to Yoshihito Nishioka in a tight three-set match. At the Adelaide International 2, he lost in the first round to compatriot and defending champion Thanasi Kokkinakis. Playing as a wildcard at his home slam, the Australian Open, he stunned eighth seed and world No. 9 Taylor Fritz, in the second round to advance to the third round for the third time at this event. He ended up losing in the third round to American rising star Ben Shelton. As a result, his ranking moved back into the top 100 from No. 113 to No. 90.

In February, Popyrin competed at the Bahrain Ministry of Interior Challenger in Manama, Bahrain. Seeded second, he made it to the quarterfinals where he lost to eighth seed and eventual champion, Thanasi Kokkinakis. In Dubai, he was defeated in the first round by qualifier Pavel Kotov. In March, he competed at the BNP Paribas Open. He fell in the final round of qualifying to Taro Daniel. However, due to the withdrawal of Kwon Soon-woo, Popyrin entered the main draw as a lucky loser. He lost in the second round to ninth seed and world No. 11 Hubert Hurkacz. At the Arizona Classic, he reached the quarterfinals where he was defeated by eventual champion Nuno Borges. In Miami, he was eliminated from the tournament in the second round by 26th seed Botic van de Zandschulp.

Popyrin started his clay-court season at the Grand Prix Hassan II. He lost in the second round to second seed and world No. 30, Dan Evans. Getting past qualifying at the Monte-Carlo Masters, he was defeated in the second round by Nicolás Jarry. Playing at the first edition of the Srpska Open, he upset fifth seed, Tallon Griekspoor, in the first round. He lost in the second round to Alex Molčan.

In Madrid, he was defeated in the first round by Quentin Halys. Making it past qualifying on his debut at the Italian Open, he earned his fifth Top 10 win of his career by upsetting world No. 10 Félix Auger-Aliassime, in the second round. Next, he defeated qualifier Roman Safiullin in the third round to reach the fourth round for the first time at a Masters level. He lost his fourth-round match to world No. 7 Holger Rune, in a three setter that lasted three hours. At the French Open, Popyrin lost in the first round to qualifier Aslan Karatsev.

In Surbiton, he lost in the first round of the singles to Luke Saville, but made the semi-finals of the doubles, partnering Aleksandar Vukic. He then beat Arthur Rinderknech in Rosmalen, before losing to eventual champion Tallon Griekspoor in the second round. He then qualified for Queen's Club, before losing to Jordan Thompson in the first round. In Wimbledon, Popyrin lost in five sets to Dominic Stricker in round one.

Popyrin's next tournament was Umag, where he defeated Benjamin Bonzi, third seed Sebastian Ofner, wildcard Dino Prižmić, seventh seed Matteo Arnaldi, and sixth seed Stan Wawrinka in the final to win his second ATP Tour title.

At the Cincinnati Open, he reached the fourth round of a Masters for a second time in the season and in his career, after entering as a lucky loser and defeating another lucky loser Daniel Altmaier and Nicolás Jarry by walkover. Next he reached his first Masters quarterfinal defeating Emil Ruusuvuori. As a result, he reached the top 40 in the rankings.

=== 2024: Canadian Open title, Olympics debut ===
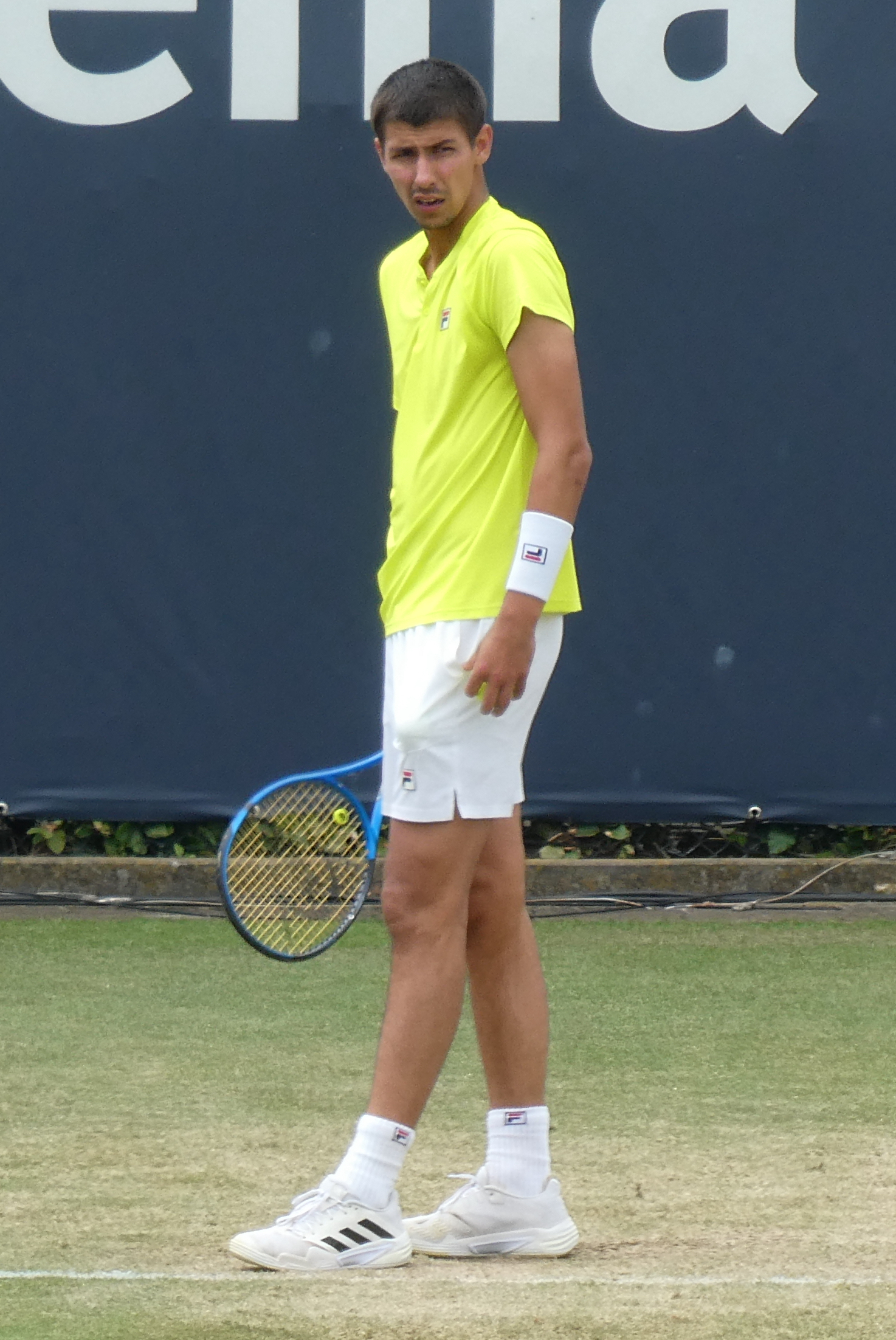
Popyrin at the 2024 Libéma Open

At the 2024 Australian Open, he reached the second round but lost to world No. 1, Novak Djokovic.

At the Qatar Open, he reached the semi-finals defeating wildcard Abdullah Shelbayh, qualifier Hugo Grenier and fourth seed Alexander Bublik. He lost to eventual champion and fourth seed Karen Khachanov.

Popyrin notably defeated the defending champion and sixth seed Andrey Rublev in the second round of the 2024 Monte-Carlo Masters, taking it in straight sets, his second career top 10 win on clay. Together with Alex de Minaur, they became the first Australians to reach the third round in Monte Carlo since Lleyton Hewitt and Wayne Arthurs in 2004.

The Australian made his debut at the 2024 Summer Olympics, France, where he reached the third round with wins over Nicolás Jarry and Stan Wawrinka. He lost to reigning Olympic champion Alexander Zverev.

Ranked No. 62, Popyrin won his first ATP 1000 title at the 2024 Canadian Open, on his debut at this Masters, replacing a withdrawn player to enter the main draw automatically. He defeated Tomáš Macháč and upset five top 20 players en route, eleventh seed Ben Shelton, seventh seed Grigor Dimitrov, saving three match points, fourth seed Hubert Hurkacz, Sebastian Korda and fifth seed Andrey Rublev in the final. As a result, Popyrin achieved a career high in the top 25 at world No. 23 in the singles rankings on 12 August 2024. He became the third Australian player to defeat at least two top 10 players in a Masters 1000 in the same season after Lleyton Hewitt and Nick Kyrgios. He became the lowest ranked finalist in men's singles since Harel Levy in 2000 who reached the final as a qualifier. He was just the eighth Aussie man to make an ATP 1000 final, and the fourth to win a title, joining Rafter, Philippoussis and Hewitt, while Kyrgios, De Minaur, Jason Stoltenberg and Todd Woodbridge, had all made the finals.

At the US Open, Popyrin reached the fourth round of a Grand Slam for the first time with an upset over defending champion Novak Djokovic in four sets. This marked the first time an Australian has beaten Djokovic at a Grand Slam since Lleyton Hewitt at the 2006 US Open. Popyrin lost in four sets to 20th seed Francis Tiafoe.

=== 2025: Monte-Carlo and Toronto quarterfinals ===
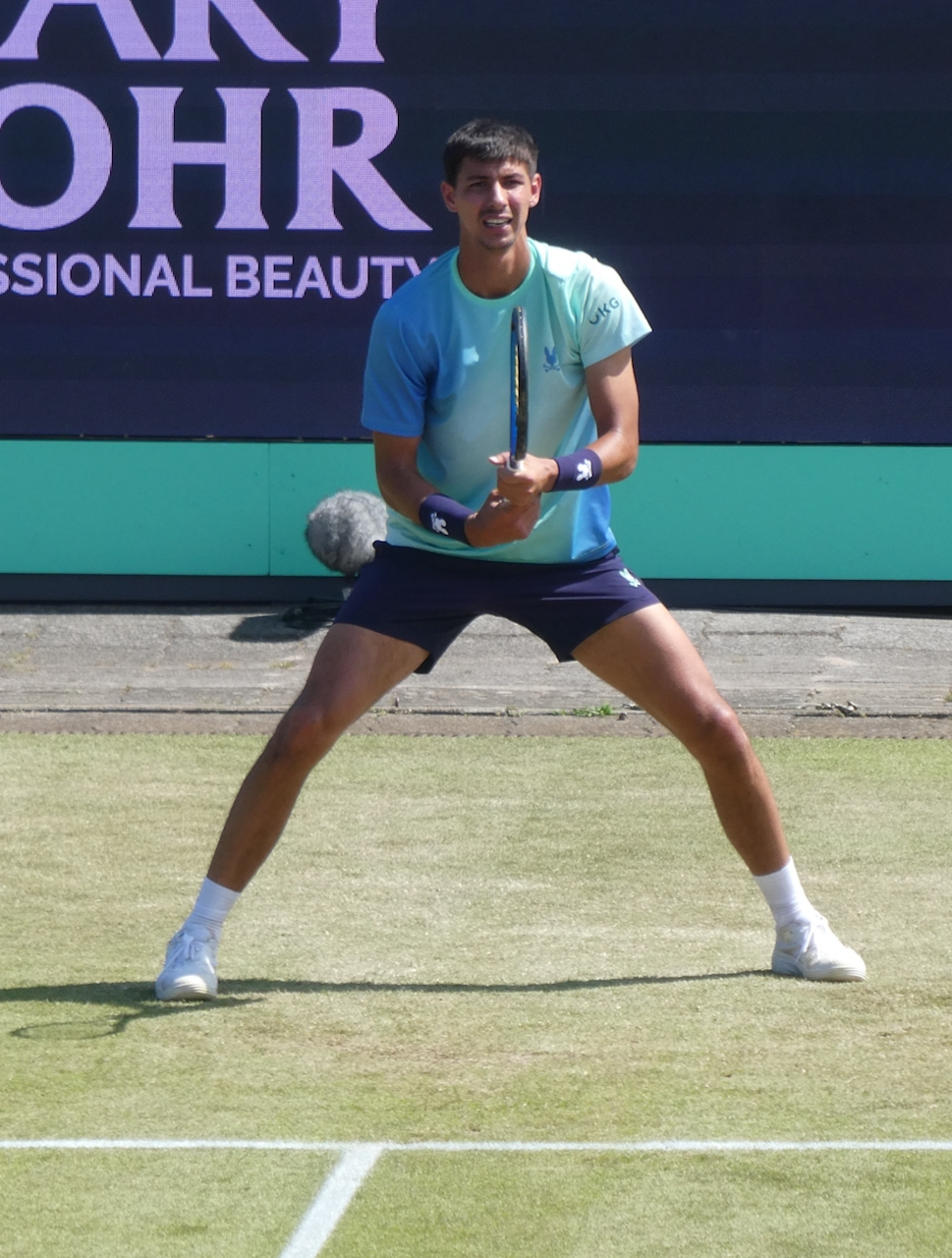
Popyrin at the 2025 Libéma Open

Popyrin had a rocky start to the year, losing to Matteo Arnaldi in Brisbane, Corentin Moutet at the Australian Open, Jiří Lehečka in Rotterdam, despite being seeded 25th, and Jack Draper in Doha. He finally picked up his first win of the season against Hady Habib in Dubai, but lost to Marin Čilić in the second round. He reached the third round of Indian Wells, beating Zizou Bergs before losing to Marcos Giron, and got upset in the second round of Miami by Roman Safiullin.

Popyrin was more successful on clay. He reached his third Masters 1000 quarterfinal in Monte-Carlo, beating Ugo Humbert, Frances Tiafoe and upsetting world No. 7 Casper Ruud before losing to Alejandro Davidovich Fokina. However, he was subsequently upset in the second round of Madrid by Alexander Bublik, and the first round of the Aix-en-Province Challenger to Stan Wawrinka. He defeated qualifier Carlos Taberner in Rome before losing to Daniil Medvedev in the third round. He finished off his clay season strongly, reaching the quarterfinals of Geneva and having his best performance at the French Open, where he reached the fourth round. On the grass courts, Popyrin only picked up one win, in Queen's Club against Aleksandar Vukic. He was subsequently upset in the first round of Wimbledon after losing to Arthur Fery in 4 sets.

As the defending champion, Popyrin reached his fourth Masters 1000 quarterfinal in Toronto, where he beat wildcard Nicolas Arseneault, 10th seed Daniil Medvedev and 5th seed and world No. 9 Holger Rune. He lost in 3 sets in the quarterfinals to Alexander Zverev.

=== 2026 ===
Popyrin started his 2026 season at the Brisbane International. He lost in the 1st round to qualifier Quentin Halys in three sets. In Adelaide, he fell in the 1st round to Reilly Opelka. At the Australian Open, he lost in the 1st round to Alexandre Müller in a five-set epic match where he served 40 aces.

After the Australian Open, Popyrin competed at the Bahrain Challenger. Despite being the top seed, he lost in the 1st round to Ugo Blanchet. At the ABN AMRO Open in Rotterdam, he fell in the 1st round to 2022 champion and eventual finalist, Félix Auger-Aliassime.

== National representation ==
=== Davis Cup ===
Popyrin made his Davis Cup debut for Australia in February 2019, at the age of 19, winning his first rubber against Bosnia and Herzegovina in Adelaide. He lost the first match of the Finals of the 2023 Davis Cup Finals to Matteo Arnaldi of Italy in three sets; Italy went on to win the next singles match to claim the trophy. Before that, he had helped get Australia to the finals by defeating Otto Virtanen of Finland in the first match of the semi-finals.

== Personal life ==
Popyrin has a brother, Anthony, and two sisters, Sonia and Anna. His brother played collegiate tennis at Arizona Christian University.

Popyrin speaks English, Russian and Spanish fluently. He is a supporter of English soccer club Everton FC.

The Australian is currently engaged to longtime partner Amy Pederick as of November 2024.

== Performance timelines ==
Key
W	F	SF	QF	#R	RR	Q#	P#	DNQ	A	Z#	PO	G	S	B	NMS	NTI	P	NH

(W) winner; (F) finalist; (SF) semifinalist; (QF) quarterfinalist; (#R) rounds 4, 3, 2, 1; (RR) round-robin stage; (Q#) qualification round; (P#) preliminary round; (DNQ) did not qualify; (A) absent; (Z#) Davis/Fed Cup Zonal Group (with number indication) or (PO) play-off; (G) gold, (S) silver or (B) bronze Olympic/Paralympic medal; (NMS) not a Masters tournament; (NTI) not a Tier I tournament; (P) postponed; (NH) not held; (SR) strike rate (events won / competed); (W–L) win–loss record.
To avoid confusion and double counting, these charts are updated at the conclusion of a tournament or when the player's participation has ended.

=== Singles ===
Current through the 2026 Eastbourne Open.

Tournament	2018	2019	2020	2021	2022	2023	2024	2025	2026	SR	W–L	Win %
Grand Slam tournaments
Australian Open	1R	3R	3R	2R	1R	3R	2R	1R	1R	0 / 9	8–9	47%
French Open	A	2R	1R	1R	1R	1R	1R	4R	1R	0 / 8	4–8	33%
Wimbledon	A	2R	NH	1R	1R	1R	3R	1R	1R	0 / 7	3–7	30%
US Open	A	3R	A	3R	2R	1R	4R	2R		0 / 6	9–6	60%
Win–loss	0–1	6–4	2–2	3–4	1–4	2–4	6–4	4–4	0–3	0 / 30	24–30	44%
National representation
Summer Olympics	Not Held			A	Not Held		3R	Not Held		0 / 1	2–1	67%
Davis Cup	A	QF	RR		A	F	SF	A		0 / 4	4–3	57%
ATP 1000 tournaments
Indian Wells Open	A	2R	NH	2R	1R	2R	A	3R	1R	0 / 6	4–6	40%
Miami Open	A	Q1	NH	3R	2R	2R	3R	2R	1R	0 / 6	6–6	50%
Monte-Carlo Masters	A	1R	NH	2R	A	2R	3R	QF	1R	0 / 6	7–6	54%
Madrid Open	A	A	NH	3R	A	1R	1R	2R	1R	0 / 5	2–5	29%
Italian Open	A	A	Q2	Q1	A	4R	1R	3R	3R	0 / 4	6–4	60%
Canadian Open	A	Q1	NH	Q1	Q2	A	W	QF	3R	1 / 3	11–2	85%
Cincinnati Open	A	Q2	A	Q2	Q1	QF	1R	1R		0 / 3	3–3	50%
Shanghai Masters	A	Q1	NH			1R	3R	A		0 / 2	1–2	33%
Paris Masters	A	A	A	3R	A	1R	3R	1R		0 / 4	4–4	50%
Win–loss	0–0	1–2	0–0	8–5	1–2	8–8	13–7	9–8	4–6	1 / 39	44–38	54%
Career statistics
Tournaments	4	19	5	22	17	23	22	23	18	Career total: 153		
Titles	0	0	0	1	0	1	1	0	0	Career total: 3		
Finals	0	0	0	1	0	1	1	0	0	Career total: 3		
Overall Win–Loss	1–4	12–19	2–5	22–22	5–17	23–23	28–22	17–23	10–18	120–153		
Win %	20%	39%	29%	50%	23%	50%	56%	43%	36%	44%		
Year-end ranking	147	97	113	61	121	40	24	54		$9,651,159		

=== Doubles ===
Current through the 2026 National Bank Open.

Tournament	2019	2020	2021	2022	2023	2024	2025	2026	SR	W–L	Win %
Grand Slam tournaments
Australian Open	3R	1R	1R	1R	2R	1R	A	A	0 / 6	3–6	33%
French Open	A	A	1R	A	2R	A	A	A	0 / 2	1–2	33%
Wimbledon	A	NH	2R	A	A	A	A	A	0 / 1	1–1	50%
US Open	A	A	1R	1R	1R	1R	A		0 / 4	0–4	0%
Win–loss	2–1	0–1	1–4	0–2	2–4	0–2	0–0	0–0	0 / 13	5–13	28%
National representation
Summer Olympics	Not Held		A	Not Held		1R	Not Held		0 / 1	0–1	0%
ATP 1000 tournaments
Monte-Carlo Masters	A	A	A	A	A	A	1R	A	0 / 1	0–1	0%
Madrid Open	A	A	A	A	A	1R	A	A	0 / 1	0–1	0%
Italian Open	A	A	A	A	A	1R	2R	A	0 / 2	1–2	0%
Shanghai Masters	A	A	A	A	1R	A	A		0 / 1	0–1	0%
Win–loss	0–0	0–0	0–0	0–0	0–1	0–2	1–2	0–0	0 / 5	1–5	17%
Career statistics
Tournaments	3	3	6	4	5	5	4	2	Career total: 32		
Titles	0	0	0	0	0	0	1	0	Career total: 1		
Finals	0	0	0	0	0	0	1	0	Career total: 1		
Overall win–loss	2–3	0–3	3–6	3–4	2–5	0–5	5–3	1–2	16–33		
Win %	40%	0%	33%	43%	29%	0%	63%	33%	33%		
Year-end ranking	278	1192	344	467	255	853	142				

== ATP 1000 tournaments finals ==
=== Singles: 1 (title) ===
Result	Year	Tournament	Surface	Opponent	Score
Win	2024	Canadian Open	Hard	Andrey Rublev	6–2, 6–4

== ATP Tour finals ==
=== Singles: 3 (3 titles) ===
Legend Grand Slam (–) ATP 1000 (1–0) ATP 500 (–) ATP 250 (2–0)	Finals by surface Hard (2–0) Clay (1–0) Grass (–)	Finals by setting Outdoor (2–0) Indoor (1–0)

Result	W–L	Date	Tournament	Tier	Surface	Opponent	Score
Win	1–0	Feb 2021	Singapore Open, Singapore	ATP 250	Hard (i)	(Kazakhstan) Alexander Bublik	4–6, 6–0, 6–2
Win	2–0	Jul 2023	Croatia Open, Croatia	ATP 250	Clay	(Switzerland) Stan Wawrinka	6–7^{(5–7)}, 6–3, 6–4
Win	3–0	Aug 2024	Canadian Open, Canada	ATP 1000	Hard	Andrey Rublev	6–2, 6–4

=== Doubles: 1 (title) ===
Legend Grand Slam (–) ATP 1000 (–) ATP 500 (1–0) ATP 250 (–)	Finals by surface Hard (1–0) Clay (–) Grass (–)	Finals by setting Outdoor (1–0) Indoor (–)

Result	W–L	Date	Tournament	Tier	Surface	Partner	Opponents	Score
Win	1–0	Mar 2025	Dubai Tennis Championships, UAE	ATP 500	Hard	(India) Yuki Bhambri	(Finland) Harri Heliövaara (United Kingdom) Henry Patten	3–6, 7–6^{(14–12)}, [10–8]

== ATP Challenger Tour finals ==
=== Singles: 2 (2 titles) ===
Legend ATP Challenger Tour (2–0)

Result	W–L	Date	Tournament	Tier	Surface	Opponent	Score
Win	1–0	Aug 2018	Jinan International Open, China	Challenger	Hard	(United Kingdom) James Ward	3–6, 6–1, 7–5
Win	2–0	May 2022	Bordeaux Challenger, France	Challenger	Clay	(France) Quentin Halys	2–6, 7–6^{(7–5)}, 7–6^{(7–4)}

=== Doubles: 1 (runner-up) ===
Legend ATP Challenger Tour (0–1)

Result	W–L	Date	Tournament	Tier	Surface	Partner	Opponents	Score
Loss	0–1	Jun 2023	Surbiton Trophy, United Kingdom	Challenger	Grass	(Australia) Aleksandar Vukic	(United Kingdom) Liam Broady (United Kingdom) Johnny O'Mara	4–6, 7–5, [8–10]

== ITF Tour finals ==
=== Singles: 2 (1 title, 1 runner-up) ===
Legend ITF Futures (1–1)

Result	W–L	Date	Tournament	Tier	Surface	Opponent	Score
Win	1–0	Jul 2017	F4 Mragowo, Poland	Futures	Clay	(Lithuania) Laurynas Grigelis	6–3, 3–6, 6–3
Loss	1–1	Nov 2017	F7 Jakarta, Indonesia	Futures	Hard	(Japan) Renta Tokuda	7–6^{(7–4)}, 2–6, 5–7

== Junior Grand Slam finals ==
=== Singles: 1 (title) ===
Result	Year	Tournament	Surface	Opponent	Score
Win	2017	French Open	Clay	(Spain) Nicola Kuhn	7–6^{(7–5)}, 6–3

== Team finals ==
=== Davis Cup: 1 (runner-up) ===
Result	Date	Tournament	Surface	Partners	Opponents	Score
Loss	Nov 2023	Davis Cup, Málaga, Spain	Hard (i)	(Australia) Alex de Minaur (Australia) Jordan Thompson (Australia) Max Purcell (Australia) Matthew Ebden	(Italy) Jannik Sinner (Italy) Lorenzo Musetti (Italy) Matteo Arnaldi (Italy) Lorenzo Sonego (Italy) Simone Bolelli	0–2

== Wins over top 10 players ==
- Popyrin has a 14–21 (40%) record against players who were, at the time the match was played, ranked in the top 10.

Season	2017	2018	2019	2020	2021	2022	2023	2024	2025	2026	Total
Wins	0	0	1	0	1	0	3	6	2	1	14

#	Player	Rank	Event	Surface	Rd	Score	APR
2019
1.	(Austria) Dominic Thiem	8	Australian Open, Australia	Hard	2R	7–5, 6–4, 2–0 ret.	149
2021
2.	(Greece) Stefanos Tsitsipas	3	Paris Masters, France	Hard (i)	2R	4–2 ret.	71
2023
3.	(Canada) Félix Auger-Aliassime	6	Adelaide International, Australia	Hard	1R	6–4, 7–6^{(7–5)}	120
4.	(United States) Taylor Fritz	9	Australian Open, Australia	Hard	2R	6–7^{(4–7)}, 7–6^{(7–2)}, 6–4, 6–7^{(6–8)}, 6–2	113
5.	(Canada) Félix Auger-Aliassime	10	Italian Open, Italy	Clay	2R	6–4, 4–6, 7–5	77
2024
6.	Andrey Rublev	6	Monte-Carlo Masters, Monaco	Clay	2R	6–4, 6–4	46
7.	(Bulgaria) Grigor Dimitrov	10	Canadian Open, Canada	Hard	3R	4–6, 7–6^{(7–5)}, 6–3	62
8.	(Poland) Hubert Hurkacz	6	Canadian Open, Canada	Hard	QF	3–6, 7–6^{(7–5)}, 7–5	62
9.	Andrey Rublev	8	Canadian Open, Canada	Hard	F	6–2, 6–4	62
10.	(Serbia) Novak Djokovic	2	US Open, United States	Hard	3R	6–4, 6–4, 2–6, 6–4	28
11.	Daniil Medvedev	5	Paris Masters, France	Hard (i)	2R	6–4, 2–6, 7–6^{(7–4)}	24
2025
12.	(Norway) Casper Ruud	7	Monte-Carlo Masters, Monaco	Clay	3R	6–4, 3–6, 7–5	27
13.	(Denmark) Holger Rune	9	Canadian Open, Canada	Hard	4R	4–6, 6–2, 6–3	26
2026
14.	(United States) Taylor Fritz	8	Geneva Open, Switzerland	Clay	2R	6–4, 6–4	61

* As of 29 May 2026

== Exhibition matches ==
=== Singles ===
Result	Date	Tournament	Surface	Opponent	Score
Loss	Jun 2024	Giorgio Armani Tennis Classic, London, United Kingdom	Grass	(Brazil) João Fonseca	6–7^{(11–13)}, 3–6
Loss	Jan 2025	Australian Open Opening Week, Melbourne, Australia	Hard	(Italy) Jannik Sinner	4–6, 6–7^{(2–7)}

== See also ==
- Australia Davis Cup team
- Sport in Australia
- Tennis in Australia
- Fastest recorded tennis serves
