= Rio Noguchi =

Japanese tennis player (born 1998)

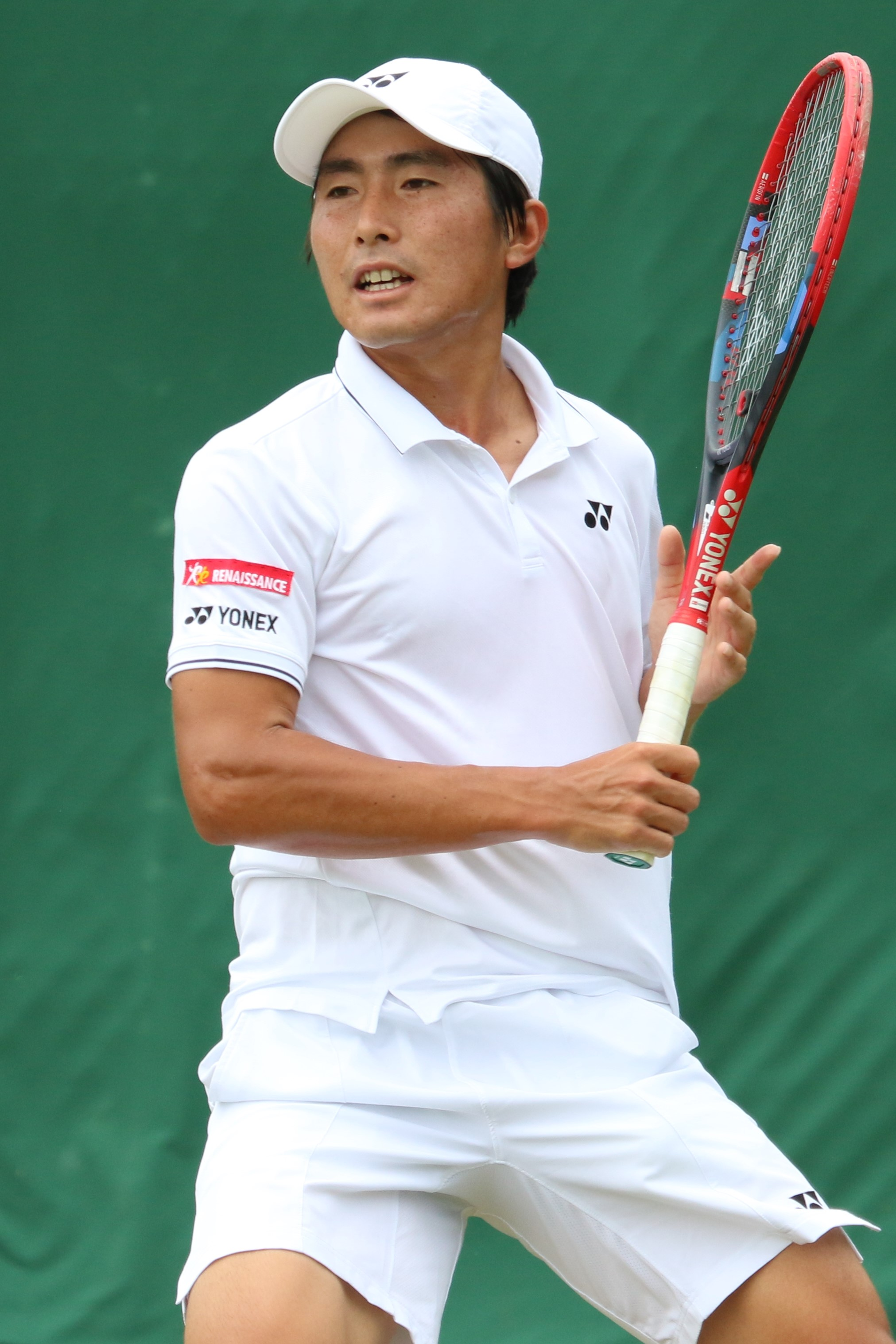
- Noguchi at the 2023 Wimbledon Championships
- Country (sports): Japan
- Born: 28 December 1998 (age 27) Fukuoka, Japan
- Height: 1.68 m (5 ft 6 in)
- Plays: Right-handed (two-handed backhand)
- Coach: Hiroyuki Kojima
- Prize money: US $554,701

Singles
- Career record: 1–1 (at ATP Tour level, Grand Slam level, and in Davis Cup)
- Career titles: 0
- Highest ranking: No. 196 (18 August 2025)
- Current ranking: No. 219 (31 August 2026)

Grand Slam singles results
- Australian Open: Q2 (2023)
- French Open: Q1 (2023, 2026)
- Wimbledon: Q2 (2023)
- US Open: Q1 (2025, 2026)

Doubles
- Career record: 0–1 (at ATP Tour level, Grand Slam level, and in Davis Cup)
- Career titles: 0
- Highest ranking: No. 166 (21 July 2025)
- Current ranking: No. 470 (31 August 2026)
- Last updated on: 1 September 2026.

Rio Noguchi (野口莉央, Noguchi Rio; born 28 December 1998) is a Japanese professional tennis player. He has a career high ATP singles ranking of No. 196 achieved on 18 August 2025 and a doubles ranking of No. 177 achieved on 5 May 2025.

== Career ==
=== 2022-2025: ATP debut, first ATP 500 win, Top 200 ===
Noguchi made his ATP main draw debut at the 2022 Rakuten Japan Open Tennis Championships after qualifying for the singles main draw, defeating Tatsuma Ito and Yusuke Takahashi to qualify. He won his first ATP and ATP 500 level match defeating fellow qualifier Ramkumar Ramanathan. He lost to Denis Shapovalov in the second round. As a result, he climbed 75 positions up the rankings into the top 250 on 17 October 2022.

== Performance timeline ==
Key
| W | F | SF | QF | #R | RR | Q# | DNQ | A | NH |

(W) winner; (F) finalist; (SF) semifinalist; (QF) quarterfinalist; (#R) rounds 4, 3, 2, 1; (RR) round-robin stage; (Q#) qualification round; (DNQ) did not qualify; (A) absent; (NH) not held; (SR) strike rate (events won / competed); (W–L) win–loss record.
To avoid confusion and double counting, these charts are updated at the conclusion of a tournament or when the player's participation has ended.

=== Singles ===
| Tournament | 2025 | 2026 | SR | W–L | Win % |
|---|---|---|---|---|---|
Grand Slam tournaments
| Australian Open | A | | 0 / 0 | 0–0 | – |
| French Open | A | | 0 / 0 | 0–0 | – |
| Wimbledon | A | | 0 / 0 | 0–0 | – |
| US Open | Q1 | Q1 | 0 / 0 | 0–0 | – |
| Win–loss | 0–0 | | 0 / 0 | 0–0 | – |
ATP Masters 1000
| Indian Wells Masters | A | | 0 / 0 | 0–0 | – |
| Miami Open | A | | 0 / 0 | 0–0 | – |
| Monte Carlo Masters | A | | 0 / 0 | 0–0 | – |
| Madrid Open | A | | 0 / 0 | 0-0 | – |
| Italian Open | A | | 0 / 0 | 0–0 | – |
| Canadian Open | A | | 0 / 0 | 0–0 | – |
| Cincinnati Masters | A | | 0 / 0 | 0–0 | – |
| Shanghai Masters | Q1 | | 0 / 0 | 0–0 | – |
| Paris Masters | A | | 0 / 0 | 0–0 | – |
| Win–loss | 0–0 | | 0 / 0 | 0–0 | – |

== ATP Challenger Tour finals ==
=== Singles: 5 (3 titles, 2 runner-ups) ===
| Legend ATP Challenger Tour (3–2) |

| Result | W–L | Date | Tournament | Tier | Surface | Opponent | Score |
|---|---|---|---|---|---|---|---|
| Loss | 0–1 | Oct 2022 | Playford, Australia | Challenger | Hard | (Australia) Rinky Hijikata | 1–6, 1–6 |
| Loss | 0–2 | Aug 2024 | Jinan, China | Challenger | Hard | (China) Wu Yibing | 5–7, 3–6 |
| Win | 1–2 | Jan 2025 | Nonthaburi, Thailand | Challenger | Hard | (China) Cui Jie | 7–6^{(11–9)}, 6–2 |
| Win | 2–2 | Jan 2026 | Nonthaburi, Thailand | Challenger | Hard | (Czech Republic) Marek Gengel | 6–3, 6–4 |
| Win | 3–2 | Mar 2026 | Yokkaichi, Japan | Challenger | Hard | (Japan) Yasutaka Uchiyama | 5–7, 7–6^{(7–5)}, 6–3 |

=== Doubles: 6 (3 titles, 3 runner-ups) ===
| Legend ATP Challenger Tour (3–3) |

| Result | W–L | Date | Tournament | Tier | Surface | Partner | Opponents | Score |
|---|---|---|---|---|---|---|---|---|
| Loss | 0–1 | Oct 2022 | Playford, Australia | Challenger | Hard | (Japan) Yusuke Takahashi | (Australia) Jeremy Beale (Australia) Calum Puttergill | 6–7^{(2–7)}, 4–6 |
| Loss | 0–2 | Nov 2022 | Yokkaichi, Japan | Challenger | Hard | (Japan) Masamichi Imamura | (Chinese Taipei) Yu Hsiou Hsu (Japan) Yuta Shimizu | 6–7^{(2–7)}, 4–6 |
| Loss | 0–3 | Aug 2024 | Jinan, China | Challenger | Hard | (Australia) Edward Winter | (Japan) Yuta Shimizu (South Korea) Chung Yun-seong | 3–6, 7–6^{(7–5)}, [6–10] |
| Win | 1–3 | Dec 2024 | Nonthaburi, Thailand | Challenger | Hard | (Japan) Kokoro Isomura | (Czech Republic) Zdeněk Kolář (Austria) Neil Oberleitner | 7–6^{(7–3)}, 7–6^{(11–9)} |
| Win | 2–3 | Feb 2025 | New Delhi, India | Challenger | Hard | (Japan) Masamichi Imamura | (India) Niki Kaliyanda Poonacha (Zimbabwe) Courtney John Lock | 6–4, 6–3 |
| Win | 3–3 | Apr 2025 | Busan, South Korea | Challenger | Hard | (Japan) Yuta Shimizu | (Chinese Taipei) Ray Ho (Australia) Matthew Romios | 7–6^{(9–7)}, 6–4 |

== ITF Futures/World Tennis Tour finals ==
=== Singles: 17 (8 titles, 9 runner-ups) ===
| Legend ITF Futures/WTT (8–9) | Finals by surface Hard (7–6) Clay (0–1) Grass (0–2) Carpet (1–0) |

| Result | W–L | Date | Tournament | Tier | Surface | Opponent | Score |
|---|---|---|---|---|---|---|---|
| Win | 1–0 | May 2018 | Vietnam F1, Thua Thien Hue | Futures | Hard | (South Korea) Nam Ji-sung | 7–6^{(7–5)}, 6–3 |
| Loss | 1–1 | Jun 2018 | Japan F7, Karuizawa | Futures | Clay | (Japan) Takashi Saito | 3–6, 4–6 |
| Win | 2–1 | Jun 2018 | Japan F8, Akishima | Futures | Carpet (i) | (Japan) Gengo Kikuchi | 6–3, 6–4 |
| Loss | 2–2 | Dec 2018 | Pakistan F1, Islamabad | Futures | Hard | (South Korea) Cheong-Eui Kim | 7–6^{(7–3)}, 2–6, 1–6 |
| Win | 2–3 | Dec 2018 | Pakistan F3, Islamabad | Futures | Hard | (Germany) Kai Wehnelt | 1–6, 5–7 |
| Loss | 2–4 | Jun 2019 | M25 Nonthaburi, Thailand | WTT | Hard | (India) Sidharth Rawat | 5–7, 0–6 |
| Loss | 2–5 | Oct 2019 | M25 Tay Ninh, Vietnam | WTT | Hard | (United States) Daniel Nguyen | 4–6, 2–6 |
| Loss | 2–6 | Mar 2020 | M25 Mildura, Australia | WTT | Grass | (United Kingdom) Brydan Klein | 5–7, 3–6 |
| Win | 3–6 | Oct 2021 | M25 Pretoria, South Africa | WTT | Hard | (Poland) Filip Peliwo | 6–3, 7–5 |
| Loss | 3–7 | Jun 2022 | M25 Harmon Air Force, Guam (USA) | WTT | Hard | (South Korea) Hong Seong-chan | 3–6, 2–6 |
| Win | 4–7 | Jul 2022 | M25 Idanha-a-Nova, Portugal | WTT | Hard | (Israel) Ben Patael | 6–2, 6–4 |
| Win | 5–7 | Jul 2022 | M25 Idanha-a-Nova, Portugal | WTT | Hard | (Israel) Ben Patael | 6–2, 7–6^{(7–5)} |
| Win | 6–7 | Sep 2022 | M25 Sapporo, Japan | WTT | Hard | (Japan) Shuichi Sekiguchi | 4–6, 7–5, 6–2 |
| Win | 7–7 | Sep 2022 | M25 Sapporo, Japan | WTT | Hard | (Japan) Tatsuma Ito | 6–1, 4–0 ret. |
| Loss | 7–8 | Oct 2022 | M25 Kashiwa, Japan | WTT | Hard | (Japan) Rimpei Kawakami | 0–0 def. |
| Loss | 7–9 | Mar 2024 | M25 Swan Hill, Australia | WTT | Grass | (Australia) Alex Bolt | 1–6, 2–6 |
| Win | 8–9 | Oct 2024 | M25 Cairns, Australia | WTT | Hard | (Australia) Blake Ellis | 6–7^{(5–7)}, 6–4, 7–6^{(7–4)} |

=== Doubles: 15 (7 titles, 8 runner-ups) ===
| Legend ITF Futures/WTT (7–8) | Finals by surface Hard (4–5) Clay (3–1) Grass (0–0) Carpet (0–2) |

| Result | W–L | Date | Tournament | Tier | Surface | Partner | Opponents | Score |
|---|---|---|---|---|---|---|---|---|
| Loss | 0–1 | Jun 2017 | Japan F8, Akishima | Futures | Carpet (i) | (Japan) Yuta Shimizu | (Japan) Yuto Sakai (Japan) Yunosuke Tanaka | 3–6, 2–6 |
| Win | 1–1 | Feb 2018 | Spain F3, Paguera | Futures | Clay | (South Korea) Chung Yun-seong | (Brazil) Bruno Santanna (Spain) David Vega Hernández | 2–6, 7–6^{(8–6)}, [10–8] |
| Loss | 1–2 | Jun 2018 | Japan F8, Karuizawa | Futures | Clay | (Japan) Yuichiro Inui | (Japan) Sora Fukuda (Japan) Hiromasa Oku | 5–7, 4–6 |
| Win | 2–2 | Dec 2018 | Pakistan F1, Islamabad | Futures | Hard | (South Korea) Cheong-Eui Kim | (Serbia) Darko Jandrić (Uzbekistan) Shonigmatjon Shofayziyev | 6–2, 6–4 |
| Loss | 2–3 | Dec 2018 | Pakistan F2, Islamabad | Futures | Hard | (Japan) Sora Fukuda | (Serbia) Darko Jandrić (South Korea) Cheong-Eui Kim | 3–6, 4–6 |
| Loss | 2–4 | Dec 2018 | Pakistan F3, Islamabad | Futures | Hard | (Japan) Ken Onishi | (Russia) Anton Chekhov (Germany) Kai Wehnelt | 3–6, 5–7 |
| Loss | 2–5 | Jun 2019 | M15 Akishima, Japan | WTT | Carpet (i) | (Japan) Yunosuke Tanaka | (Japan) Hiroyasu Ehara (Japan) Sho Katayama | 3–6, 4–6 |
| Win | 3–5 | Oct 2019 | M25 Tay Ninh, Vietnam | WTT | Hard | (Russia) Alexey Zakharov | (United States) Samuel Beren (United Kingdom) Billy Harris | 6–7^{(5–7)}, 6–4, [10–4] |
| Loss | 3–6 | Dec 2019 | M15 Doha, Qatar | WTT | Hard | (Morocco) Adam Moundir | (Ukraine) Danylo Kalenichenko (Belarus) Ivan Liutarevich | 3–6, 6–7^{(3–7)} |
| Win | 4–6 | Oct 2020 | M15 Sharm El Sheikh, Egypt | WTT | Hard | (Japan) Shintaro Mochizuki | (Netherlands) Ryan Nijboer (Netherlands) Gijs Brouwer | 6–2, 7–5 |
| Win | 5–6 | Apr 2021 | M15 Antalya, Turkey | WTT | Clay | (Japan) Shintaro Mochizuki | (Germany) Constantin Schmitz (Lebanon) Benjamin Hassan | 7–6^{(7–2)}, 6–2 |
| Loss | 5–7 | Aug 2021 | M25 Champaign, USA | WTT | Hard | (South Korea) Chung Yun-seong | (United States) Ben Shelton (United States) Eliot Spizzirri | 4–6, 0–6 |
| Loss | 5–8 | Nov 2021 | M25 Meitar, Israel | WTT | Hard | (Japan) Naoki Nakagawa | (Finland) Iiro Vasa (Finland) Eero Vasa | 1–6, 6–7^{(3–7)} |
| Win | 6–8 | Jul 2022 | M25 Idanha-a-Nova, Portugal | WTT | Hard | (Greece) Alexandros Skorilas | (Chinese Taipei) Ray Ho (Canada) Kelsey Stevenson | 6–7^{(4–7)}, 6–3, [10–3] |
| Win | 7–8 | May 2024 | M25 Kiseljak, Bosnia and Herzegovina | WTT | Clay | (Japan) Koki Matsuda | (Czech Republic) Matěj Vocel (Switzerland) Jakub Paul | 2–6, 7–6^{(7–5)}, [11–9] |
