= 2017 China International Challenger Jinan =

- Date: 7–12 August
- Edition: 1st
- Surface: Hard
- Location: Jinan, China

Champions

Singles
- (Chinese Taipei) Lu Yen-hsun

Doubles
- (Chinese Taipei) Hsieh Cheng-peng / (Chinese Taipei) Peng Hsien-yin
China International Challenger Jinan	· 2018 →

The 2017 China International Challenger Jinan was a professional tennis tournament played on hard courts. It was the first edition of the tournament which was part of the 2017 ATP Challenger Tour. It took place in Jinan, China between 7 and 12 August 2017.

== Singles main-draw entrants ==
=== Seeds ===
Country	Player	Rank^{1}	Seed
TPE	Lu Yen-hsun	89	1
RUS	Evgeny Donskoy	124	2
JPN	Go Soeda	138	3
KOR	Lee Duck-hee	151	4
SRB	Nikola Milojević	178	5
LTU	Ričardas Berankis	193	6
KOR	Kwon Soon-woo	203	7
JPN	Hiroki Moriya	212	8

- ^{1} Rankings are as of 31 July 2017.

=== Other entrants ===
The following player received a wildcard into the singles main draw:

- (China) Zhang Zhizhen

The following player received entry into the singles main draw with a protected ranking:

- (India) Saketh Myneni

The following players received entry from the qualifying draw:

- (India) Vijay Sundar Prashanth
- (India) Sidharth Rawat
- (Japan) Kento Takeuchi

The following players received entry as lucky losers:

- (Belarus) Sergey Betov
- (United States) Mousheg Hovhannisyan
- (Japan) Toshihide Matsui

== Champions ==
=== Singles ===
- (Chinese Taipei) Lu Yen-hsun def. (Lithuania) Ričardas Berankis 6–3, 6–1.

=== Doubles ===
- (Chinese Taipei) Hsieh Cheng-peng / (Chinese Taipei) Peng Hsien-yin def. (India) Sriram Balaji / (India) Vishnu Vardhan 4–6, 6–4, [10–4].
