= Jinan Open =

- 2026 Jinan Open

Tournament information
- Event name: Jinan Open (2024–); Jinan International Open (2018–2019); China International Challenger Jinan (2017)
- Location: Jinan, China
- Venue: Jinan Olympic Sports Center
- Surface: Hard

Current champions (2026)
- Men's singles: (Italy) Mattia Bellucci
- Women's singles: (Indonesia) Janice Tjen
- Men's doubles: (Japan) Jay Friend (Chinese Taipei) Ray Ho
- Women's doubles: Elena Pridankina; Ekaterina Reyngold
ATP Tour
- Category: ATP Challenger Tour 125 (2017-2019, 2025-)
- Draw: 32S / 32Q / 16D
- Prize money: $200,000
WTA Tour
- Category: WTA 125 (2025)
- Draw: 32S / 16Q / 16D
- Prize money: $115,000

The Jinan Open (Chinese: 济南国际网球公开赛; pinyin: Jǐnán Guójì Wǎngqiú Gōngkāi Sài) is a professional tennis tournament played on outdoor hardcourts. It is currently an ATP Challenger 125 and was also a WTA 125 event in 2025. The tournament is held annually in Jinan, China since 2017. It was previously part of the ITF Women's World Tennis Tour until 2025.

== Past finals ==
=== Men's singles ===
Year	Champion	Runner-up	Score
2026	(Italy) Mattia Bellucci	(Spain) Martín Landaluce	6–2, 4–6, 6–3
2025	(France) Arthur Cazaux	(United States) Mackenzie McDonald	6–3, 6–2
2024	(China) Wu Yibing	(Japan) Rio Noguchi	7–5, 6–3
2020–23	not held		
2019	(China) Zhang Zhizhen	(Japan) Go Soeda	7–5, 2–6, 6–4
2018	(Australia) Alexei Popyrin	(United Kingdom) James Ward	3–6, 6–1, 7–5
2017	(Chinese Taipei) Lu Yen-hsun	(Lithuania) Ričardas Berankis	6–3, 6–1

=== Women's singles ===
Year	Champion	Runner-up	Score
2026	not held		
2025	(Indonesia) Janice Tjen	(Hungary) Anna Bondár	6–4, 4–6, 6–4
↑ WTA 125 event ↑
2024	(China) Zheng Wushuang	(China) Yao Xinxin	6–2, 6–2
2020–23	not held		
2019	(China) You Xiaodi	(Australia) Kaylah McPhee	6–3, 7–6^{(7–5)}
2018	(China) Zhu Lin	(China) Wang Yafan	6–4, 6–1

=== Men's doubles ===
Year	Champions	Runners-up	Score
2026	(Japan) Jay Friend (Chinese Taipei) Ray Ho	(Netherlands) Thijmen Loof (Japan) Kaito Uesugi	2–6, 7–6^{(7–5)}, [10–4]
2025	(New Zealand) Finn Reynolds (New Zealand) James Watt	(India) Rithvik Choudary Bollipalli (India) Arjun Kadhe	7–5, 7–6^{(7–1)}
2024	(South Korea) Chung Yun-seong (Japan) Yuta Shimizu	(Japan) Rio Noguchi (Australia) Edward Winter	6–3, 6–7^{(5–7)}, [10–6]
2020–23	not held		
2019	(Australia) Matthew Ebden (India) Divij Sharan	(South Korea) Nam Ji-sung (South Korea) Song Min-kyu	7–6^{(7–4)}, 5–7, [10–3]
2018	(Chinese Taipei) Hsieh Cheng-peng (Chinese Taipei) Yang Tsung-hua	(Kazakhstan) Alexander Bublik (Russia) Alexander Pavlioutchenkov	7–6^{(7–5)}, 4–6, [10–5]
2017	(Chinese Taipei) Hsieh Cheng-peng (Chinese Taipei) Peng Hsien-yin	(India) Sriram Balaji (India) Vishnu Vardhan	4–6, 6–4, [10–4]

=== Women's doubles ===
Year	Champions	Runners-up	Score
2026	not held		
2025	Elena Pridankina; Ekaterina Reyngold	(India) Rutuja Bhosale (China) Zheng Wushuang	6–1, 6–3
↑ WTA 125 event ↑
2024	(China) Guo Meiqi (China) Xiao Zhenghua	(China) Feng Shuo (China) Liu Fangzhou	6–3, 1–6, [10–5]
2020–23	not held		
2019	(China) Yuan Yue (China) Zheng Wushuang	(United Kingdom) Samantha Murray (United Kingdom) Eden Silva	1–6, 6–4, [10–7]
2018	(China) Wang Xinyu (China) You Xiaodi	(Chinese Taipei) Hsieh Shu-ying (China) Lu Jingjing	6–3, 6–7^{(5–7)}, [10–2]
