= 2025 Queensland International III – Men's doubles =

Men's doubles
- 2025 Queensland International III

Final
- Champions: (Australia) Matt Hulme (Australia) Kody Pearson
- Runners-up: (India) Anirudh Chandrasekar (United States) Reese Stalder
- Score: 7–6^{(7–5)}, 3–6, [10–6]

Events
Singles	men	women
Doubles	men	women
- Queensland International

Joshua Charlton and Patrick Harper were the defending champions but only Charlton chose to defend his title, partnering Colin Sinclair. They lost in the semifinals to Anirudh Chandrasekar and Reese Stalder.

Matt Hulme and Kody Pearson won the title after defeating Chandrasekar and Stalder 7–6^{(7–5)}, 3–6, [10–6] in the final.

== Seeds ==
1. (Australia) Blake Bayldon / (Australia) Matthew Romios (quarterfinals)
2. (India) Anirudh Chandrasekar / (United States) Reese Stalder (final)
3. (Japan) Rio Noguchi / (Japan) Naoki Tajima (first round)
4. (Australia) Joshua Charlton / (Northern Mariana Islands) Colin Sinclair (semifinals)

== Draw ==
Key

- Q = Qualifier
- WC = Wild card
- LL = Lucky loser
- Alt = Alternate
- ITF = ITF entry
- PR = Protected ranking
- SR = Special ranking
- SE = Special exempt
- JE = Junior exempt
- JR = Junior Accelerator Programme entrant
- CO = College Accelerator Programme entrant
- NG = Next Gen Accelerator Program entrant
- w/o = Walkover
- r = Retired
- d = Defaulted

First round
1	(Australia) B Bayldon (Australia) MC Romios	6	4	[10]
(Australia) Ja Delaney (Australia) L Tu	3	6	[3]
(Australia) C Puttergill (Australia) D Sweeny	7^{7}	6
(United States) Christian Langmo (Poland) F Peliwo	6^{2}	1
3	(Japan) R Noguchi (Japan) N Tajima	6	5	[8]
(Australia) Ethan Cook (Australia) Tai Sach	3	7	[10]
(Australia) M Hulme (Australia) K Pearson	6	7^{7}
WC	(Australia) H Jones (Australia) Pavle Marinkov	1	6^{4}
(United Kingdom) F Bass (New Zealand) A Rai	6	6^{5}	[10]
WC	(Australia) C Hewitt (Australia) Duje Markovina	2	7^{7}	[8]
PR	(Australia) Je Delaney (United Kingdom) B Walkin	3	7^{7}	[7]
4	(Australia) J Charlton (Northern Mariana Islands) C Sinclair	6	6^{5}	[10]
Alt	(Japan) Kousuke Ogura (Japan) Leo Vithoontien	1	7^{7}	[10]
(Czech Republic) M Gengel (United Kingdom) Emile Hudd	6	6^{4}	[7]
(India) Aryan Shah (India) K Singh	7^{7}	0	[2]
2	(India) A Chandrasekar (United States) R Stalder	6^{4}	6	[10]

Quarterfinals
1	(Australia) B Bayldon (Australia) MC Romios	4	7^{7}	[3]
(Australia) C Puttergill (Australia) D Sweeny	6	6^{3}	[10]
(Australia) E Cook (Australia) T Sach	6	5	[8]
(Australia) M Hulme (Australia) K Pearson	4	7	[10]
(United Kingdom) F Bass (New Zealand) A Rai	7^{7}	4	[5]
4	(Australia) J Charlton (Northern Mariana Islands) C Sinclair	6^{4}	6	[10]
Alt	(Japan) K Ogura (Japan) L Vithoontien	7	1	[6]
2	(India) A Chandrasekar (United States) R Stalder	5	6	[10]

Semifinals
(Australia) C Puttergill (Australia) D Sweeny	4	3
(Australia) M Hulme (Australia) K Pearson	6	6
4	(Australia) J Charlton (Northern Mariana Islands) C Sinclair	6^{6}	7	[9]
2	(India) A Chandrasekar (United States) R Stalder	7^{8}	5	[11]

Final
(Australia) M Hulme (Australia) K Pearson	7^{7}	3	[10]
2	(India) A Chandrasekar (United States) R Stalder	6^{5}	6	[6]
