= 2026 Queensland International – Men's doubles =

Men's doubles
- 2026 Queensland International

Final
- Champions: (Australia) Blake Bayldon (Australia) Marc Polmans
- Runners-up: (Australia) Jake Delaney (Australia) Dane Sweeny
- Score: 6–4, 6–4

Events
| Singles | men | women |
| Doubles | men | women |
- Queensland International

Matt Hulme and Kody Pearson were the defending champions but lost in the first round to Jake Delaney and Dane Sweeny.

Blake Bayldon and Marc Polmans won the title after defeating Delaney and Sweeny 6–4, 6–4 in the final.

== Seeds ==
1. (Australia) Joshua Charlton / (Australia) Patrick Harper (first round)
2. (Japan) Yuta Shimizu / (Japan) Seita Watanabe (quarterfinals)
3. (Australia) Matt Hulme / (Australia) Kody Pearson (first round)
4. (Australia) Blake Bayldon / (Australia) Marc Polmans (champions)

== Draw ==
Key

- Q = Qualifier
- WC = Wild card
- LL = Lucky loser
- Alt = Alternate
- ITF = ITF entry
- PR = Protected ranking
- SR = Special ranking
- SE = Special exempt
- JE = Junior exempt
- JR = Junior Accelerator Programme entrant
- CO = College Accelerator Programme entrant
- NG = Next Gen Accelerator Program entrant
- w/o = Walkover
- r = Retired
- d = Defaulted

First round
1 | (Australia) J Charlton (Australia) P Harper | 6^{6} | 4
(United States) Dar Blanch (Japan) R Sakamoto | 7^{8} | 6
(Australia) A Bolt (Japan) Y Uchiyama | 6 | 7^{7}
(Japan) K Isomura (Japan) Renta Tokuda | 3 | 6^{3}
3 | (Australia) M Hulme (Australia) K Pearson | 5 | 6^{3}
(Australia) Ja Delaney (Australia) D Sweeny | 7 | 7^{7}
(Japan) M Imamura (Japan) N Tajima | 7^{7} | 7^{7}
(Australia) O Jasika (China) F Sun | 6^{5} | 6^{3}
WC | (Australia) Ty Host (Australia) Duje Markovina | 4 | 4
(Australia) Ethan Cook (Australia) Tai Sach | 6 | 6
WC | (Australia) C Hewitt (Australia) L Tu | 6 | 5 | [8]
4 | (Australia) B Bayldon (Australia) M Polmans | 3 | 7 | [10]
(France) C Denolly (China) A Wang | 6 | 4 | [6]
(Chinese Taipei) J Jung (Japan) K Uesugi | 4 | 6 | [10]
PR | (Australia) M Romios (United Kingdom) B Walkin | 6 | 6^{3} | [8]
2 | (Japan) Y Shimizu (Japan) S Watanabe | 3 | 7^{7} | [10]

Quarterfinals
(United States) Dar Blanch (Japan) R Sakamoto | 6 | 3 | [10]
(Australia) A Bolt (Japan) Y Uchiyama | 1 | 6 | [4]
(Australia) Ja Delaney (Australia) D Sweeny | 6 | 6
(Japan) M Imamura (Japan) N Tajima | 3 | 2
(Australia) E Cook (Australia) T Sach | 6 | 3 | [5]
4 | (Australia) B Bayldon (Australia) M Polmans | 4 | 6 | [10]
(Chinese Taipei) J Jung (Japan) K Uesugi | 3 | 6 | [11]
2 | (Japan) Y Shimizu (Japan) S Watanabe | 6 | 3 | [9]

Semifinals
(United States) Dar Blanch (Japan) R Sakamoto | 4 | 4
(Australia) Ja Delaney (Australia) D Sweeny | 6 | 6
4 | (Australia) B Bayldon (Australia) M Polmans | 4 | 7^{7} | [10]
(Chinese Taipei) J Jung (Japan) K Uesugi | 6 | 6^{4} | [6]

Final
(Australia) Ja Delaney (Australia) D Sweeny | 4 | 4
4 | (Australia) B Bayldon (Australia) M Polmans | 6 | 6
