= 2026 Queensland International II – Men's doubles =

Men's doubles
- 2026 Queensland International II

Final
- Champions: (Australia) Jake Delaney (Australia) Marc Polmans
- Runners-up: (Australia) Matt Hulme (Australia) Kody Pearson
- Score: 6–2, 6–3

Events
Singles	men	women
Doubles	men	women
- Queensland International

Blake Bayldon and Marc Polmans were the defending champions but chose to defend their title with different partners. Bayldon partnered Jesse Delaney but lost in the first round to Ethan Cook and Tai Sach. Polmans partnered Jake Delaney and successfully defended his title after defeating Matt Hulme and Kody Pearson 6–2, 6–3 in the final.

== Seeds ==
1. (Australia) Joshua Charlton / (Australia) Matthew Romios (semifinals)
2. (Australia) Jake Delaney / (Australia) Marc Polmans (champions)
3. (Australia) Matt Hulme / (Australia) Kody Pearson (final)
4. (Japan) Kokoro Isomura / (Japan) Kaito Uesugi (first round)

== Draw ==
Key

- Q = Qualifier
- WC = Wild card
- LL = Lucky loser
- Alt = Alternate
- ITF = ITF entry
- PR = Protected ranking
- SR = Special ranking
- SE = Special exempt
- JE = Junior exempt
- JR = Junior Accelerator Programme entrant
- CO = College Accelerator Programme entrant
- NG = Next Gen Accelerator Program entrant
- w/o = Walkover
- r = Retired
- d = Defaulted

First round
1	(Australia) J Charlton (Australia) M Romios	7^{11}	6
(Australia) O Jasika (China) F Sun	6^{9}	4
PR	(New Zealand) A Rai (United Kingdom) B Walkin	6	5	[10]
(Japan) M Imamura (Japan) N Tajima	2	7	[3]
3	(Australia) M Hulme (Australia) K Pearson	7^{7}	6
WC	(Australia) O Anderson (Australia) C Hewitt	6^{3}	4
(Australia) B Bayldon (Australia) Je Delaney	4	7^{7}	[7]
(Australia) Ethan Cook (Australia) Tai Sach	6	6^{5}	[10]
WC	(Australia) Ty Host (Australia) Duje Markovina	3	7^{7}	[10]
Alt	(Germany) J Mackenzie (Japan) Ryo Tabata	6	6^{3}	[7]
(France) C Denolly (China) A Wang	3	7^{7}	[10]
4	(Japan) K Isomura (Japan) K Uesugi	6	6^{5}	[7]
(Japan) H Matsuoka (Japan) Hikaru Shiraishi	3	6	[10]
(Japan) S Hazawa (France) A Weber	6	4	[4]
(Japan) Y Uchiyama (Japan) S Watanabe	7	3	[4]
2	(Australia) Ja Delaney (Australia) M Polmans	5	6	[10]

Quarterfinals
1	(Australia) J Charlton (Australia) M Romios	6	6
PR	(New Zealand) A Rai (United Kingdom) B Walkin	4	2
3	(Australia) M Hulme (Australia) K Pearson	5	7	[10]
(Australia) E Cook (Australia) T Sach	7	5	[4]
WC	(Australia) T Host (Australia) D Markovina	w/o
(France) C Denolly (China) A Wang
(Japan) H Matsuoka (Japan) H Shiraishi	3	1
2	(Australia) Ja Delaney (Australia) M Polmans	6	6

Semifinals
1	(Australia) J Charlton (Australia) M Romios	6^{4}	4
3	(Australia) M Hulme (Australia) K Pearson	7^{7}	6
WC	(Australia) T Host (Australia) D Markovina	4	4
2	(Australia) Ja Delaney (Australia) M Polmans	6	6

Final
3	(Australia) M Hulme (Australia) K Pearson	2	3
2	(Australia) Ja Delaney (Australia) M Polmans	6	6
