= 2026 Queensland International II =

- Date: 9 – 15 February
- Edition: 5th
- Surface: Hard
- Location: Brisbane, Australia

Champions

Men's singles
- (China) Zhang Zhizhen

Women's singles
- (Australia) Emerson Jones

Men's doubles
- (Australia) Jake Delaney / (Australia) Marc Polmans

Women's doubles
- (Japan) Natsumi Kawaguchi / (Japan) Sara Saito
- Brisbane Tennis International

The 2026 Brisbane Tennis International II was a professional tennis tournament played on hardcourts. It was the fifth edition of the tournament which was part of the 2026 ATP Challenger Tour and 2026 ITF Women's World Tennis Tour. It took place in Brisbane, Australia between 9 and 15 February 2026.

== Men's singles main-draw entrants ==
=== Seeds ===
Country	Player	Rank^{1}	Seed
~~AUS~~	~~Tristan Schoolkate~~	~~114~~	~~1~~
AUS	Dane Sweeny	151	2
JPN	Rei Sakamoto	184	3
AUS	Alex Bolt	188	4
~~AUS~~	~~James McCabe~~	~~208~~	~~5~~
CHN	Zhou Yi	220	6
CHN	Sun Fajing	273	7
USA	Darwin Blanch	278	8
JPN	Yasutaka Uchiyama	326	9

- ^{1} Rankings are as of 2 February 2026.

=== Other entrants ===
The following players received wildcards into the singles main draw:

- (Australia) Cruz Hewitt
- (Australia) Pavle Marinkov
- (Australia) Tai Sach

The following players received entry from the qualifying draw:

- (Australia) Matthew Dellavedova
- (Japan) Masamichi Imamura
- (Japan) Kokoro Isomura
- (Japan) Yuki Mochizuki
- (Japan) Naoki Nakagawa
- (Northern Mariana Islands) Colin Sinclair

The following players received entry as lucky losers:

- (Australia) Matt Hulme
- (Germany) Jamie Mackenzie

== Champions ==
=== Men's singles ===
- (China) Zhang Zhizhen def. (Australia) Alex Bolt 6–2, 6–4.

=== Women's singles ===
- (Australia) Emerson Jones def. (China) Zhu Lin 6–4, 7–5

=== Men's doubles ===
- (Australia) Jake Delaney / (Australia) Marc Polmans def. (Australia) Matt Hulme / (Australia) Kody Pearson 6–2, 6–3.

=== Women's doubles ===
- (Japan) Natsumi Kawaguchi / (Japan) Sara Saito def. (Australia) Gabriella Da Silva-Fick / (Australia) Tenika McGiffin 6–2, 6–4
