= 2025 Queensland International II – Men's doubles =

Men's doubles
- 2025 Queensland International II

Final
- Champions: (Australia) Joshua Charlton (Australia) Patrick Harper
- Runners-up: (Australia) Matt Hulme (New Zealand) James Watt
- Score: 4–6, 7–6^{(7–5)}, [12–10]

Events
Singles	men	women
Doubles	men	women
- Queensland International

Matthew Romios and Colin Sinclair were the defending champions but only Sinclair chose to defend his title, partnering Jake Delaney. They lost in the quarterfinals to Blake Ellis and Hsu Yu-hsiou.

Joshua Charlton and Patrick Harper won the title after defeating Matt Hulme and James Watt 4–6, 7–6^{(7–5)}, [12–10] in the final.

== Seeds ==
1. (United Kingdom) Charles Broom / (India) Anirudh Chandrasekar (first round)
2. (Australia) Joshua Charlton / (Australia) Patrick Harper (champions)
3. (Australia) Blake Ellis / (Chinese Taipei) Hsu Yu-hsiou (semifinals, withdrew)
4. (Australia) Blake Bayldon / (Netherlands) Mats Hermans (semifinals)

== Draw ==
Key

- Q = Qualifier
- WC = Wild card
- LL = Lucky loser
- Alt = Alternate
- ITF = ITF entry
- PR = Protected ranking
- SR = Special ranking
- SE = Special exempt
- JE = Junior exempt
- JR = Junior Accelerator Programme entrant
- CO = College Accelerator Programme entrant
- NG = Next Gen Accelerator Program entrant
- w/o = Walkover
- r = Retired
- d = Defaulted

=== Draw ===
First round
1	(United Kingdom) C Broom (India) A Chandrasekar	4	7^{7}	[7]
(Australia) Je Delaney (United Kingdom) M Whitehouse	6	6^{5}	[10]
(Australia) M Hulme (New Zealand) J Watt	6^{5}	6	[10]
(Czech Republic) M Gengel (France) M Janvier	7^{7}	2	[6]
4	(Australia) B Bayldon (Netherlands) M Hermans	4	6	[15]
(Australia) C Hewitt (Australia) Duje Markovina	6	3	[13]
(Chinese Taipei) T-h Huang (Japan) Hikaru Shiraishi	6	7
(Japan) M Imamura (Japan) S Watanabe	4	5
(Japan) Kosuke Ogura (Japan) Keisuke Saitoh	6^{2}	3
(Australia) Ja Delaney (Northern Mariana Islands) C Sinclair	7^{7}	6
(Australia) H Jones (Australia) Pavle Marinkov	3	7^{7}	[0]
3	(Australia) B Ellis (Chinese Taipei) Y-h Hsu	6	6^{2}	[10]
(Japan) S Hazawa (Japan) Shintaro Imai	6	6
(Japan) Yuki Mochizuki (Japan) N Nakagawa	0	3
(Australia) K Pearson (United States) J Sheehy	3	7^{7}	[8]
2	(Australia) J Charlton (Australia) P Harper	6	6^{5}	[10]

Quarterfinals
(Australia) Je Delaney (United Kingdom) M Whitehouse	6^{9}	3
(Australia) M Hulme (New Zealand) J Watt	7^{11}	6
4	(Australia) B Bayldon (Netherlands) M Hermans	6	7^{10}
(Chinese Taipei) T-h Huang (Japan) H Shiraishi	4	6^{8}
(Australia) Ja Delaney (Northern Mariana Islands) C Sinclair	4	4
3	(Australia) B Ellis (Chinese Taipei) Y-h Hsu	6	6
(Japan) S Hazawa (Japan) S Imai	6	3	[6]
2	(Australia) J Charlton (Australia) P Harper	4	6	[10]

Semifinals
(Australia) M Hulme (New Zealand) J Watt	7^{7}	6^{5}	[10]
4	(Australia) B Bayldon (Netherlands) M Hermans	6^{5}	7^{7}	[4]
3	(Australia) B Ellis (Chinese Taipei) Y-h Hsu
2	(Australia) J Charlton (Australia) P Harper	w/o

Final
(Australia) M Hulme (New Zealand) J Watt	6	6^{5}	[10]
2	(Australia) J Charlton (Australia) P Harper	4	7^{7}	[12]
