= 2026 Queensland International II – Men's singles =

Men's singles
- 2026 Queensland International II

Final
- Champion: (China) Zhang Zhizhen
- Runner-up: (Australia) Alex Bolt
- Score: 6–2, 6–4

Events
Singles	men	women
Doubles	men	women
- Queensland International

Dane Sweeny was the defending champion but lost in the quarterfinals to Hiroki Moriya.

Zhang Zhizhen won the title after defeating Alex Bolt 6–2, 6–4 in the final.

== Seeds ==
1. (Australia) Tristan Schoolkate (withdrew)
2. (Australia) Dane Sweeny (quarterfinals)
3. (Japan) Rei Sakamoto (semifinals)
4. (Australia) Alex Bolt (final)
5. (Australia) James McCabe (withdrew)
6. (China) Zhou Yi (first round)
7. (China) Sun Fajing (first round)
8. (United States) Darwin Blanch (quarterfinals)
9. (Japan) Yasutaka Uchiyama (second round)

== Draw ==
Key

- Q = Qualifier
- WC = Wild card
- LL = Lucky loser
- Alt = Alternate
- ITF = ITF entry
- PR = Protected ranking
- SR = Special ranking
- SE = Special exempt
- JE = Junior exempt
- JR = Junior Accelerator Programme entrant
- CO = College Accelerator Programme entrant
- NG = Next Gen Accelerator Program entrant
- w/o = Walkover
- r = Retired
- d = Defaulted

=== Finals ===
Semifinals
(China) Zhang Zhizhen	6	6
3	(Japan) Rei Sakamoto	1	4
4	(Australia) Alex Bolt	6	3	6
(Japan) Hiroki Moriya	3	6	3

Final
(China) Zhang Zhizhen	6	6
4	(Australia) Alex Bolt	2	4

=== Top half ===
First round
LL	(Germany) J Mackenzie	5	6	1
(Australia) M Polmans	7	2	6
(Japan) H Matsuoka	6	6
(Australia) Ja Delaney	4	4
WC	(Australia) Pavle Marinkov	6^{4}	3
(China) Z Zhang	7^{7}	6
WC	(Australia) C Hewitt	5	5
9	(Japan) Y Uchiyama	7	7
3	(Japan) R Sakamoto	6	6
Q	(Japan) Yuki Mochizuki	0	1
Q	(Northern Mariana Islands) C Sinclair	5	7^{7}	6
LL	(Australia) M Hulme	7	6^{4}	4
(Australia) L Tu	6^{6}	6	7^{7}
Q	(Japan) N Nakagawa	7^{8}	4	6^{2}
(Australia) B Ellis	7^{7}	3	7
7	(China) F Sun	6^{2}	6	5

Second round
(Australia) M Polmans	6	6^{2}	3
(Japan) H Matsuoka	4	7^{7}	6
(China) Z Zhang	6	7^{9}
9	(Japan) Y Uchiyama	4	6^{7}
3	(Japan) R Sakamoto	7	6
Q	(Northern Mariana Islands) C Sinclair	5	3
(Australia) L Tu	6	6
(Australia) B Ellis	4	4

Quarterfinals
(Japan) H Matsuoka	3	5
(China) Z Zhang	6	7
3	(Japan) R Sakamoto	7^{7}	6
(Australia) L Tu	6^{3}	4

Semifinals
(China) Z Zhang	6	6
3	(Japan) R Sakamoto	1	4

=== Bottom half ===
First round
8	(United States) Dar Blanch	6	7
(France) C Denolly	4	5
(France) A Weber	6	2	7
(Spain) D Jordà Sanchis	3	6	5
(Australia) O Jasika	4	6	7^{7}
(Japan) Hikaru Shiraishi	6	2	6^{5}
Q	(Japan) K Isomura	5	3
4	(Australia) A Bolt	7	6
6	(China) Y Zhou	4	6	2
WC	(Australia) Tai Sach	6	2	6
(Australia) M Bouzige	4	4
(Japan) H Moriya	6	6
Q	(Australia) Matthew Dellavedova	6	4	3
Q	(Japan) M Imamura	3	6	6
(Japan) T Daniel	5	4
2	(Australia) D Sweeny	7	6

Second round
8	(United States) Dar Blanch	6	6
(France) A Weber	1	3
(Australia) O Jasika	2	1^{r}
4	(Australia) A Bolt	6	4
WC	(Australia) T Sach	7^{8}	0	4
(Japan) H Moriya	6^{6}	6	6
Q	(Japan) M Imamura	3	2
2	(Australia) D Sweeny	6	6

Quarterfinals
8	(United States) Dar Blanch	5	3
4	(Australia) A Bolt	7	6
(Japan) H Moriya	7	7^{7}
2	(Australia) D Sweeny	5	6^{3}

Semifinals
4	(Australia) A Bolt	6	3	6
(Japan) H Moriya	3	6	3
