= 2026 River City Challenger – Men's doubles =

Men's doubles
- 2026 River City Challenger

Final
- Champions: (Australia) Blake Ellis (Australia) Li Tu
- Runners-up: (United States) Alafia Ayeni (Japan) Kokoro Isomura
- Score: 6–7^{(4–7)}, 6–4, [12–10]

Events
Singles	men	women
Doubles	men	women
- River City Challenger

Jake Delaney and Marc Polmans were the defending champions but only Delaney chose to defend his title, partnering Jesse Delaney. They lost in the first round to Alafia Ayeni and Kokoro Isomura.

Blake Ellis and Li Tu won the title after defeating Ayeni and Isomura 6–7^{(4–7)}, 6–4, [12–10] in the final.

== Seeds ==
1. (Australia) Blake Bayldon / (Australia) Thomas Fancutt (semifinals)
2. (Australia) Jake Delaney / (Australia) Jesse Delaney (first round)
3. (Chinese Taipei) Jason Jung / (New Zealand) Ajeet Rai (first round)
4. (Australia) Calum Puttergill / (Australia) Dane Sweeny (quarterfinals)

== Draw ==
Key

- Q = Qualifier
- WC = Wild card
- LL = Lucky loser
- Alt = Alternate
- ITF = ITF entry
- PR = Protected ranking
- SR = Special ranking
- SE = Special exempt
- JE = Junior exempt
- JR = Junior Accelerator Programme entrant
- CO = College Accelerator Programme entrant
- NG = Next Gen Accelerator Program entrant
- w/o = Walkover
- r = Retired
- d = Defaulted

First round
1	(Australia) B Bayldon (Australia) T Fancutt	7^{7}	6
(Germany) F Broska (Czech Republic) J Kumstát	6^{5}	4
(Australia) Enzo Aguiard (Australia) Pavle Marinkov	1	6	[11]
(Chinese Taipei) J Hsu (United States) E Zhu	6	4	[9]
3	(Chinese Taipei) J Jung (New Zealand) A Rai	6	0	[8]
(Australia) Ethan Cook (Australia) Tai Sach	3	6	[10]
(Japan) A Santillan (China) B Zheng	3	4
(Australia) B Ellis (Australia) L Tu	6	6
(New Zealand) Reece Falck (United States) B Suarez	7	6
Alt	(Australia) O Jasika (Australia) Christopher Sousou	5	4
(New Zealand) I Becroft (New Zealand) Anton Shepp	6	4	[6]
4	(Australia) C Puttergill (Australia) D Sweeny	2	6	[10]
(Japan) S Hazawa (Japan) Yamato Sueoka	3	7^{7}	[7]
(Australia) M Bouzige (Australia) Casey Hoole	6	6^{2}	[10]
(United States) A Ayeni (Japan) K Isomura	6	6
2	(Australia) Ja Delaney (Australia) Je Delaney	3	4

Quarterfinals
1	(Australia) B Bayldon (Australia) T Fancutt	6	6
(Australia) E Aguiard (Australia) P Marinkov	4	3
(Australia) E Cook (Australia) T Sach	3	6^{6}
(Australia) B Ellis (Australia) L Tu	6	7^{8}
(New Zealand) R Falck (United States) B Suarez	6	7
4	(Australia) C Puttergill (Australia) D Sweeny	4	5
(Australia) M Bouzige (Australia) C Hoole	6^{7}	1
(United States) A Ayeni (Japan) K Isomura	7^{9}	6

Semifinals
1	(Australia) B Bayldon (Australia) T Fancutt	5	3
(Australia) B Ellis (Australia) L Tu	7	6
(New Zealand) R Falck (United States) B Suarez	4	4
(United States) A Ayeni (Japan) K Isomura	6	6

Final
(Australia) B Ellis (Australia) L Tu	6^{4}	6	[12]
(United States) A Ayeni (Japan) K Isomura	7^{7}	4	[10]
