= 2025 Queensland International II =

- Date: 3 – 9 February
- Edition: 2nd
- Surface: Hard
- Location: Brisbane, Australia

Champions

Men's singles
- (Australia) Adam Walton

Women's singles
- (Australia) Kimberly Birrell

Men's doubles
- (Australia) Joshua Charlton / (Australia) Patrick Harper

Women's doubles
- (Japan) Miho Kuramochi / (China) Zheng Wushuang
- Brisbane QTC Tennis International

The 2025 Brisbane QTC Tennis International II was a professional tennis tournament played on hardcourts. It was the second edition of the tournament which was part of the 2025 ATP Challenger Tour and 2025 ITF Women's World Tennis Tour. It took place in Brisbane, Australia between 3 and 9 February 2025.

== Men's singles main-draw entrants ==
=== Seeds ===
| Country | Player | Rank^{1} | Seed |
|---|---|---|---|
| AUS | Adam Walton | 87 | 1 |
| AUS | Tristan Schoolkate | 147 | 2 |
| AUS | Alex Bolt | 168 | 3 |
| AUS | Li Tu | 169 | 4 |
| JPN | Yuta Shimizu | 196 | 5 |
| AUS | Omar Jasika | 208 | 6 |
| AUS | Bernard Tomic | 220 | 7 |
| AUS | James McCabe | 225 | 8 |

- ^{1} Rankings are as of 27 January 2025.

=== Other entrants ===
The following players received wildcards into the singles main draw:

- (Australia) Jacob Bradshaw
- (Australia) Jason Kubler
- (Australia) Pavle Marinkov

The following players received entry from the qualifying draw:

- (Australia) Jake Delaney
- (Australia) Matt Hulme
- (Japan) Kosuke Ogura
- (Japan) Keisuke Saitoh
- (Japan) Hikaru Shiraishi
- (France) Arthur Weber

The following player received entry as a lucky loser:

- (Japan) Hayato Matsuoka

== Champions ==
=== Men's singles ===
- (Australia) Adam Walton def. (Australia) Jason Kubler 7–6^{(8–6)}, 7–6^{(7–4)}.

=== Women's singles ===
- (Australia) Kimberly Birrell def. (Australia) Maddison Inglis 6–2, 4–6, 7–6^{(7–2)}.

=== Men's doubles ===
- (Australia) Joshua Charlton / (Australia) Patrick Harper def. (Australia) Matt Hulme / (New Zealand) James Watt 4–6, 7–6^{(7–5)}, [12–10].

=== Women's doubles ===
- (Japan) Miho Kuramochi / (China) Zheng Wushuang def. (France) Tessah Andrianjafitrimo / (Norway) Malene Helgø 7–6^{(8–6)}, 6–3.
