= 2026 River City Challenger – Men's singles =

Men's singles
- 2026 River City Challenger

Final
- Champion: (Denmark) August Holmgren
- Runner-up: (United States) Christian Langmo
- Score: 7–6^{(7–5)}, 6–2

Events
Singles	men	women
Doubles	men	women
- River City Challenger

Zhang Zhizhen was the defending champion but chose not to defend his title.

August Holmgren won the title after defeating Christian Langmo 7–6^{(7–5)}, 6–2 in the final.

== Seeds ==
1. (Australia) Dane Sweeny (quarterfinals)
2. (Australia) Christopher O'Connell (second round)
3. (Australia) Tristan Schoolkate (first round)
4. (Australia) Alex Bolt (quarterfinals)
5. (Australia) Bernard Tomic (quarterfinals)
6. (Czech Republic) Jan Kumstát (first round, withdrew)
7. (Australia) Matthew Dellavedova (second round)
8. (China) Shang Juncheng (semifinals)

== Draw ==
Key

- Q = Qualifier
- WC = Wild card
- LL = Lucky loser
- Alt = Alternate
- ITF = ITF entry
- PR = Protected ranking
- SR = Special ranking
- SE = Special exempt
- JE = Junior exempt
- JR = Junior Accelerator Programme entrant
- CO = College Accelerator Programme entrant
- NG = Next Gen Accelerator Program entrant
- w/o = Walkover
- r = Retired
- d = Defaulted

=== Finals ===
Semifinals
8	(China) Shang Juncheng	6^{3}	6^{1}
Q	(United States) Christian Langmo	7^{7}	7^{7}
(United States) Sebastian Gorzny	6^{5}	3
(Denmark) August Holmgren	7^{7}	6

Final
Q	(United States) Christian Langmo	6^{5}	2
(Denmark) August Holmgren	7^{7}	6

=== Top half ===
First round
1	(Australia) D Sweeny	6	6
Q	(New Zealand) Anton Shepp	3	1
WC	(Australia) Casey Hoole	6	6
Q	(Australia) Sam Ryan Ziegann	3	2
(Denmark) CE Overbeck	6	5	7^{7}
(Germany) F Broska	2	7	6^{4}
(Australia) Ja Delaney	3	6	4
8	(China) J Shang	6	3	6
3	(Australia) T Schoolkate	6	5	6^{4}
(Australia) C Hewitt	3	7	7^{7}
(Australia) Enzo Aguiard	4	2
(Japan) A Santillan	6	6
Q	(United States) Christian Langmo	7^{7}	6
WC	(Australia) Ymerali Ibraimi	6^{2}	3
(Australia) J McCabe	w/o
6	(Czech Republic) J Kumstát

Second round
1	(Australia) D Sweeny	6	7^{7}
WC	(Australia) C Hoole	4	6^{4}
(Denmark) CE Overbeck	7^{7}	2	1
8	(China) J Shang	6^{5}	6	6
(Australia) C Hewitt	6^{6}	4
(Japan) A Santillan	7^{8}	6
Q	(United States) C Langmo	6	4	6
(Australia) J McCabe	2	6	3

Quarterfinals
1	(Australia) D Sweeny	2	7^{7}	4
8	(China) J Shang	6	6^{5}	6
(Japan) A Santillan	7^{7}	6^{5}	4
Q	(United States) C Langmo	6^{4}	7^{7}	6

Semifinals
8	(China) J Shang	6^{3}	6^{1}
Q	(United States) C Langmo	7^{7}	7^{7}

=== Bottom half ===
First round
7	(Australia) Matthew Dellavedova	6	6^{7}	7^{7}
Q	(Australia) T Fancutt	1	7^{9}	6^{5}
(United States) S Gorzny	6	3	6
Q	(New Zealand) I Becroft	1	6	3
(United States) A Ayeni	6^{3}	7^{7}	6
(Australia) E Winter	7^{7}	6^{4}	2
Q	(Japan) H Moriya	2	3
4	(Australia) A Bolt	6	6
5	(Australia) B Tomic	6	4	7
WC	(Australia) B Ellis	3	6	5
(Australia) O Jasika	6	6
(India) D Suresh	3	2
(Denmark) A Holmgren	6	4	7
(Australia) P Sekulic	4	6	5
LL	(Australia) M Bouzige	4	1
2	(Australia) C O'Connell	6	6

Second round
7	(Australia) M Dellavedova	5	4
(United States) S Gorzny	7	6
(United States) A Ayeni	4	6	6^{4}
4	(Australia) A Bolt	6	3	7^{7}
5	(Australia) B Tomic	7^{7}	7^{7}
(Australia) O Jasika	6^{3}	6^{4}
(Denmark) A Holmgren	6	6
2	(Australia) C O'Connell	2	2

Quarterfinals
(United States) S Gorzny	4	6	6
4	(Australia) A Bolt	6	3	2
5	(Australia) B Tomic	2	7	3
(Denmark) A Holmgren	6	5	6

Semifinals
(United States) S Gorzny	6^{5}	3
(Denmark) A Holmgren	7^{7}	6
