= 2025 Queensland International III – Men's singles =

Men's singles
- 2025 Queensland International III

Final
- Champion: (Australia) Alex Bolt
- Runner-up: (Chinese Taipei) Wu Tung-lin
- Score: 6–3, 6–3

Events
Singles	men	women
Doubles	men	women
- Queensland International

Adam Walton was the defending champion but chose not to defend his title.

Alex Bolt won the title after defeating Wu Tung-lin 6–3, 6–3 in the final.

== Seeds ==
1. (Australia) James Duckworth (quarterfinals)
2. (Australia) Rinky Hijikata (first round)
3. (Australia) Bernard Tomic (quarterfinals)
4. (Australia) Jason Kubler (first round)
5. (Australia) James McCabe (first round)
6. (Australia) Alex Bolt (champion)
7. (Australia) Dane Sweeny (semifinals)
8. (Japan) Rio Noguchi (first round)

== Draw ==
Key

- Q = Qualifier
- WC = Wild card
- LL = Lucky loser
- Alt = Alternate
- ITF = ITF entry
- PR = Protected ranking
- SR = Special ranking
- SE = Special exempt
- JE = Junior exempt
- JR = Junior Accelerator Programme entrant
- CO = College Accelerator Programme entrant
- NG = Next Gen Accelerator Program entrant
- w/o = Walkover
- r = Retired
- d = Defaulted

=== Finals ===
Semifinals
6	(Australia) Alex Bolt	6	6
7	(Australia) Dane Sweeny	3	4
Q	(Chinese Taipei) Wu Tung-lin	6	7^{7}
Q	(Japan) Hayato Matsuoka	3	6^{4}

Final
6	(Australia) Alex Bolt	6	6
Q	(Chinese Taipei) Wu Tung-lin	3	3

=== Top half ===
First round
1	(Australia) J Duckworth	6	3
(Australia) O Jasika	0	2^{r}
(Australia) B Ellis	6	6
(Australia) M Bouzige	1	4
(Australia) M Polmans	1	7^{8}	6
(India) Aryan Shah	6	6^{6}	1
(Poland) F Peliwo	4	2
6	(Australia) A Bolt	6	6
3	(Australia) B Tomic	6	7
(Australia) L Tu	4	5
(Czech Republic) M Gengel	6	6
(India) K Singh	2	4
WC	(Australia) Tai Sach	3	6	6
(Japan) H Moriya	6	4	2
WC	(Australia) Pavle Marinkov	0	1
7	(Australia) D Sweeny	6	6

Second round
1	(Australia) J Duckworth	3	6	6
(Australia) B Ellis	6	1	4
(Australia) M Polmans	4	0
6	(Australia) A Bolt	6	6
3	(Australia) B Tomic	7	3	7^{7}
(Czech Republic) M Gengel	5	6	6^{3}
WC	(Australia) T Sach	2	3
7	(Australia) D Sweeny	6	6

Quarterfinals
1	(Australia) J Duckworth	5	1
6	(Australia) A Bolt	7	6
3	(Australia) B Tomic	7	3	2
7	(Australia) D Sweeny	5	6	6

Semifinals
6	(Australia) A Bolt	6	6
7	(Australia) D Sweeny	3	4

=== Bottom half ===
First round
5	(Australia) J McCabe	2	1
WC	(Australia) C Hewitt	6	6
Q	(Chinese Taipei) T-l Wu	7^{7}	6
(United States) Christian Langmo	6^{5}	4
Q	(Denmark) CE Overbeck	6	6
(Australia) P Sekulic	3	3
Q	(Japan) Leo Vithoontien	6	3	6
4	(Australia) J Kubler	3	6	3
8	(Japan) R Noguchi	2	6^{3}
(Australia) Ja Delaney	6	7^{7}
JR	(Netherlands) M Röttgering	6	6
Q	(Jamaica) B Bicknell	3	1
(Australia) Matthew Dellavedova	1	6	2
Q	(United Kingdom) Emile Hudd	6	2	6
Q	(Japan) H Matsuoka	6	6
2	(Australia) R Hijikata	4	2

Second round
WC	(Australia) C Hewitt	6	3	4
Q	(Chinese Taipei) T-l Wu	3	6	6
Q	(Denmark) CE Overbeck	6	7^{7}
Q	(Japan) L Vithoontien	2	6^{1}
(Australia) Ja Delaney	6^{2}	6	3
JR	(Netherlands) M Röttgering	7^{7}	3	2^{r}
Q	(United Kingdom) E Hudd	4	4
Q	(Japan) H Matsuoka	6	6

Quarterfinals
Q	(Chinese Taipei) T-l Wu	6	6
Q	(Denmark) CE Overbeck	3	4
(Australia) Ja Delaney	4	4
Q	(Japan) H Matsuoka	6	6

Semifinals
Q	(Chinese Taipei) T-l Wu	6	7^{7}
Q	(Japan) H Matsuoka	3	6^{4}
