= 2025 Queensland International II – Men's singles =

Men's singles
- 2025 Queensland International II

Final
- Champion: (Australia) Adam Walton
- Runner-up: (Australia) Jason Kubler
- Score: 7–6^{(8–6)}, 7–6^{(7–4)}

Events
Singles	men	women
Doubles	men	women
- Queensland International

Tristan Schoolkate was the defending champion but lost in the first round to Jason Kubler.

Adam Walton won the title after defeating Kubler 7–6^{(8–6)}, 7–6^{(7–4)} in the final.

== Seeds ==
1. (Australia) Adam Walton (champion)
2. (Australia) Tristan Schoolkate (first round)
3. (Australia) Alex Bolt (first round)
4. (Australia) Li Tu (quarterfinals)
5. (Japan) Yuta Shimizu (quarterfinals)
6. (Australia) Omar Jasika (semifinals)
7. (Australia) Bernard Tomic (first round)
8. (Australia) James McCabe (quarterfinals)

== Draw ==
Key

- Q = Qualifier
- WC = Wild card
- LL = Lucky loser
- Alt = Alternate
- ITF = ITF entry
- PR = Protected ranking
- SR = Special ranking
- SE = Special exempt
- JE = Junior exempt
- JR = Junior Accelerator Programme entrant
- CO = College Accelerator Programme entrant
- NG = Next Gen Accelerator Program entrant
- w/o = Walkover
- r = Retired
- d = Defaulted

=== Finals ===
Semifinals
1	(Australia) Adam Walton	6	6
6	(Australia) Omar Jasika	2	4
(United States) Christian Langmo	4	4
WC	(Australia) Jason Kubler	6	6

Final
1	(Australia) Adam Walton	7^{8}	7^{7}
WC	(Australia) Jason Kubler	6^{6}	6^{4}

=== Top half ===
First round
1	(Australia) A Walton	6	6
(United States) G Nanda	2	4
(Japan) H Moriya	6	6
Q	(France) A Weber	4	2
Q	(Japan) Keisuke Saitoh	5	2
(United States) Andre Ilagan	7	6
(Japan) M Imamura	6	3	6
7	(Australia) B Tomic	2	6	2
4	(Australia) L Tu	6	6
Q	(Japan) Hikaru Shiraishi	1	1
WC	(Australia) Pavle Marinkov	6^{5}	6	6^{5}
Q	(Australia) Ja Delaney	7^{7}	3	7^{7}
(Czech Republic) M Gengel	6	6
(United Kingdom) C Broom	1	2
(Australia) B Ellis	3	2
6	(Australia) O Jasika	6	6

Second round
1	(Australia) A Walton	6	6
(Japan) H Moriya	3	4
(United States) A Ilagan	2	7^{7}	6
(Japan) M Imamura	6	6^{3}	0
4	(Australia) L Tu	6	6^{7}	6
Q	(Australia) Ja Delaney	0	7^{9}	4
(Czech Republic) M Gengel	6^{1}	6	3
6	(Australia) O Jasika	7^{7}	3	6

Quarterfinals
1	(Australia) A Walton	6	6
(United States) A Ilagan	3	4
4	(Australia) L Tu	6	5	2
6	(Australia) O Jasika	2	7	6

Semifinals
1	(Australia) A Walton	6	6
6	(Australia) O Jasika	2	4

=== Bottom half ===
First round
5	(Japan) Y Shimizu	6	3	6
LL	(Japan) H Matsuoka	3	6	3
(Japan) N Nakagawa	6^{4}	6^{5}
Q	(Japan) Kosuke Ogura	7^{7}	7^{7}
(Australia) D Sweeny	2	2
(United States) Christian Langmo	6	6
(France) M Janvier	6	6
3	(Australia) A Bolt	4	4
8	(Australia) J McCabe	6	6
WC	(Australia) Jacob Bradshaw	3	1
Q	(Australia) M Hulme	0	6	6
(China) Y Zhou	6	4	4
(Australia) M Bouzige	5	6^{2}
(Chinese Taipei) Y-h Hsu	7	7^{7}
WC	(Australia) J Kubler	6	3	6
2	(Australia) T Schoolkate	4	6	3

Second round
5	(Japan) Y Shimizu	6	2	6
Q	(Japan) K Ogura	2	6	1
(United States) C Langmo	5	6	6
(France) M Janvier	7	4	4
8	(Australia) J McCabe	6	6
Q	(Australia) M Hulme	3	4
(Chinese Taipei) Y-h Hsu	2	1
WC	(Australia) J Kubler	6	6

Quarterfinals
5	(Japan) Y Shimizu	4	7^{7}	3
(United States) C Langmo	6	6^{5}	6
8	(Australia) J McCabe	6^{1}	1
WC	(Australia) J Kubler	7^{7}	6

Semifinals
(United States) C Langmo	4	4
WC	(Australia) J Kubler	6	6
