= 2025 Queensland International III =

- Date: 10 – 16 November
- Edition: 3rd
- Surface: Hard
- Location: Brisbane, Australia

Champions

Men's singles
- (Australia) Alex Bolt

Women's singles
- (United Kingdom) Katie Swan

Men's doubles
- (Australia) Matt Hulme / (Australia) Kody Pearson

Women's doubles
- (Australia) Destanee Aiava / (Australia) Maddison Inglis
- Queensland International

The 2025 Queensland International III was a professional tennis tournament played on hardcourts. It was the third edition of the tournament which was part of the 2025 ATP Challenger Tour and 2025 ITF Women's World Tennis Tour. It took place in Brisbane, Australia between 10 and 16 November 2025.

== Men's singles main-draw entrants ==
=== Seeds ===
Country	Player	Rank^{1}	Seed
AUS	James Duckworth	113	1
AUS	Rinky Hijikata	127	2
AUS	Bernard Tomic	185	3
AUS	Jason Kubler	188	4
AUS	James McCabe	195	5
AUS	Alex Bolt	198	6
AUS	Dane Sweeny	242	7
JPN	Rio Noguchi	246	8

- ^{1} Rankings are as of 3 November 2025.

=== Other entrants ===
The following players received wildcards into the singles main draw:

- (Australia) Cruz Hewitt
- (Australia) Pavle Marinkov
- (Australia) Tai Sach

The following player received entry into the singles main draw through the Junior Accelerator programme:

- (Netherlands) Mees Röttgering

The following players received entry from the qualifying draw:

- (Jamaica) Blaise Bicknell
- (United Kingdom) Emile Hudd
- (Japan) Hayato Matsuoka
- (Denmark) Carl Emil Overbeck
- (Japan) Leo Vithoontien
- (Chinese Taipei) Wu Tung-lin

== Champions ==
=== Men's singles ===
- (Australia) Alex Bolt def. (Chinese Taipei) Wu Tung-lin 6–3, 6–3.

=== Women's singles ===
- (United Kingdom) Katie Swan def. (China) Wei Sijia 3–6, 6–3, 6–3.

=== Men's doubles ===
- (Australia) Matt Hulme / (Australia) Kody Pearson def. (India) Anirudh Chandrasekar / (United States) Reese Stalder 7–6^{(7–5)}, 3–6, [10–6].

=== Women's doubles ===
- (Australia) Destanee Aiava / (Australia) Maddison Inglis def. (Australia) Gabriella Da Silva-Fick / (Australia) Tenika McGiffin 7–6^{(7–3)}, 7–6^{(9–7)}.
