= 2026 River City Challenger =

- Date: 9 – 15 November
- Edition: 6th
- Surface: Hard
- Location: Brisbane, Australia
- Venue: Queensland Tennis Centre (QTC)

Champions

Men's singles
- (Denmark) August Holmgren

Women's singles
- (Chinese Taipei) Joanna Garland

Men's doubles
- (Australia) Blake Ellis / (Australia) Li Tu

Women's doubles
- (Australia) Olivia Gadecki / (Chinese Taipei) Wan I-wen
- River City Challenger

The 2026 River City Challenger was a professional tennis tournament played on hardcourts. It was the sixth edition of the tournament which was part of the 2026 ATP Challenger Tour and 2026 ITF Women's World Tennis Tour. It took place in Brisbane, Australia between 9 and 15 November 2026.

== Men's singles main-draw entrants ==
=== Seeds ===
Country	Player	Rank^{1}	Seed
AUS	Dane Sweeny	114	1
AUS	Christopher O'Connell	117	2
AUS	Tristan Schoolkate	143	3
AUS	Alex Bolt	174	4
AUS	Bernard Tomic	181	5
~~CZE~~	~~Jan Kumstát~~	~~194~~	~~6~~
AUS	Matthew Dellavedova	235	7
CHN	Shang Juncheng	250	8

- ^{1} Rankings are as of 2 November 2026.

=== Other entrants ===
The following players received wildcards into the singles main draw:

- (Australia) Blake Ellis
- (Australia) Casey Hoole
- (Australia) Ymerali Ibraimi

The following players received entry from the qualifying draw:

- (New Zealand) Isaac Becroft
- (Australia) Thomas Fancutt
- (United States) Christian Langmo
- (Japan) Hiroki Moriya
- (Australia) Sam Ryan Ziegann
- (New Zealand) Anton Shepp

The following player received entry as a lucky loser:

- (Australia) Moerani Bouzige

== Champions ==
=== Men's singles ===
- (Denmark) August Holmgren def. (United States) Christian Langmo 7–6^{(7–5)}, 6–2.

=== Women's singles ===
- (Chinese Taipei) Joanna Garland def. (United States) Carol Young Suh Lee 5–7, 6–1, 6–2

=== Men's doubles ===
- (Australia) Blake Ellis / (Australia) Li Tu def. (United States) Alafia Ayeni / (Japan) Kokoro Isomura 6–7^{(4–7)}, 6–4, [12–10].

=== Women's doubles ===
- (Australia) Olivia Gadecki / (Chinese Taipei) Wan I-wen def. (Australia) Amy Stevens / (Australia) Belle Thompson 6–2, 6–0
