= Marc Polmans =

Australian tennis player (born 1997)

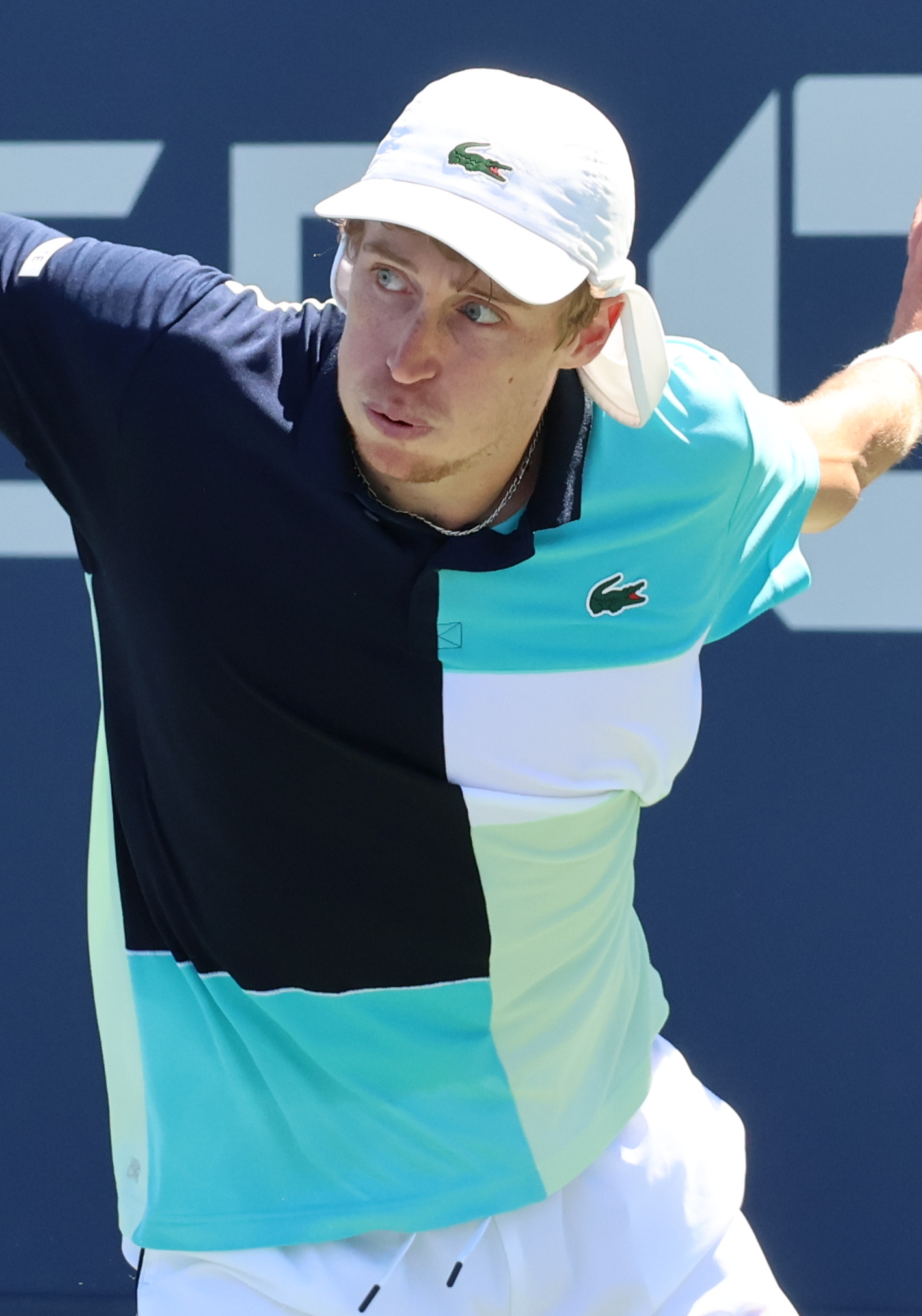
- Polmans at the 2023 US Open
- Country (sports): Australia
- Residence: Brighton East, Victoria, Australia
- Born: 2 May 1997 (age 29) Amanzimtoti, South Africa
- Height: 1.88 m (6 ft 2 in)
- Turned pro: 2015
- Plays: Right-handed (two-handed backhand)
- Coach: Greg Polmans, Marcel du Coudray
- Prize money: US $2,225,820

Singles
- Career record: 6–18
- Career titles: 0
- Highest ranking: No. 116 (12 October 2020)
- Current ranking: No. 350 (27 July 2026)

Grand Slam singles results
- Australian Open: 2R (2020)
- French Open: 2R (2020)
- Wimbledon: 2R (2021)
- US Open: 1R (2020)

Doubles
- Career record: 39–30
- Career titles: 3
- Highest ranking: No. 21 (27 July 2026)
- Current ranking: No. 21 (27 July 2026)

Grand Slam doubles results
- Australian Open: F (2026)
- Wimbledon: 2R (2026)
- US Open: 3R (2026)

Grand Slam mixed doubles results
- Australian Open: SF (2021, 2023, 2024)
- Wimbledon: F (2026)
- Last updated on: 27 July 2026.

Marc David Polmans (born 2 May 1997) is a South African-born Australian professional tennis player. He has a career-high ATP singles ranking of No. 116 achieved on 12 October 2020 and a best doubles ranking of world No. 21 achieved on 27 July 2026. Polmans has won three ATP Tour doubles titles. He also reached the 2026 Australian Open men's doubles final with compatriot Jason Kubler, and the 2026 Wimbledon mixed doubles final with Storm Hunter.

== Junior career ==
Polmans had good results on the ITF junior circuit. He won the boys' doubles title at the 2015 Australian Open, with compatriot Jake Delaney. The pair defeated Hubert Hurkacz and Alex Molčan in the final.

== Professional career ==
=== 2012–2015: First professional matches ===
Polmans turned pro in 2012 and ended the year with a ranking of 1813. Over the next three years, he played predominantly in the ITF Men's Tour. The Aussie won his first title with Steven de Waard at the Australia F9, a Futures-level event, in 2014. The pair won five more titles the next year.

Polmans reached the second round of qualifying in the 2015 Australian Open where he defeated Jordi Samper-Montaña in the first round before losing to Tim Smyczek.

=== 2016–2017: Australian doubles semifinal, ATP singles debut ===
Polmans commenced 2016 with a singles ranking of 841. He lost in the first round of qualifying at the 2016 Australian Open. In June 2016, Polmans won his first singles title in Mozambique F1. This was followed by another title the following week. Over the next 3 months, Polmans reached a further 6 finals, winning 2 including one in Alice Springs. In November, Polmans reached his first ATP Challenger Tour final in Canberra. He lost to compatriot James Duckworth in straight sets. He ended 2016 with a ranking of No. 226.

Polmans commenced 2017 at the Happy Valley Challenger with a loss. Polmans lost in the 2017 Australian Open qualifying first round. In doubles, Polmans with Andrew Whittington as a wildcard pair, reached the semifinals. Polmans made the second round of the French Open qualifying.

He received a wildcard entry to the 2017 Croatia Open, marking his first singles main draw appearance on the ATP World Tour but lost to Alessandro Giannessi. In July, Polmans made the main draw of the Citi Open in Washington as a lucky loser, losing to Jared Donaldson. Polmans ended the year on the Challenger circuit with his best result being a semi-final appearance at Canberra. Polmans ended 2017 with a singles ranking of No. 323 and doubles ranking of No. 70.

=== 2018: First challenger title ===
In February, Polmans won his maiden challenger title at the 2018 Launceston Tennis International. In April he lost to Noah Rubin of the US in the finals of the 2018 Tallahassee Tennis Challenger in Florida. In May and June, Polmans lost in the first round of French Open qualifying and Wimbledon qualifying. He continued to play across the Challenger tour of Europe. In August, Polmans lost in the final round of qualifying for the US Open. In October, Polmans partnered Jeremy Beale to win his first doubles challenger title at Traralgon.

=== 2019: Major debut at Australian Open, Challenger title, first ATP win ===
Polmans was awarded a wildcard into the 2019 Australian Open. He lost in the first round to USA's Denis Kudla in five sets 5–7, 1–6, 6–2, 6–3, 6–2.

In March, Polmans won his second ATP Challenger title when defeating Italy's Lorenzo Giustino 6–4, 4–6, 7–6^{(4)}.

In July, Polman qualified for the main draw of the Washington Open. Polmans defeated Malek Jaziri for his first main draw win on the ATP Tour. In August, Polmans lost in the first round of 2019 US Open – Men's singles qualifying.

=== 2020: First two Major wins, US and French Open debut ===
In January participating again as a wildcard, Polman won his first main draw singles match at the Australian Open over Mikhail Kukushkin. Polmans also won his first French Open match as a lucky loser against Ugo Humbert.

Having reached a career-high singles ranking of World No. 116 on 12 October 2020, Polmans ended 2020 with a singles ranking of World No. 124 and a doubles ranking of World No. 130.

=== 2021: Australian mixed doubles semifinal, Wimbledon singles debut ===
For the third year in a row being awarded a wildcard, he lost in the first round of the Australian Open to Márton Fucsovics but he made the semifinals of the 2021 Australian Open – Mixed doubles with Storm Sanders.

He qualified for the first time in his career into the main singles draw of the 2021 Wimbledon Championships. Polmans defeated former quarterfinalist Lu Yen-hsun in the first round. Polmans lost to 19th seed Cristian Garín in round two.

In July, Polmans reached the quarterfinal at the Kitzbühel Open in doubles partnering Pedro Martínez. Polmans ended 2021 with a singles ranking of World No. 196 and a doubles ranking of World No. 103.

=== 2022–2024: Hiatus, substantial rankings drop, comeback ===
Polmans lost in the second round of qualifying at the 2022 Australian Open. He also lost in the first round of qualifying at the 2022 US Open. He won his seventh doubles Challenger title in Korea with Max Purcell and returned to the top 300 in doubles jumping up 345 places to world No. 297 on 24 October 2022.

Polmans was disqualified in the last round of qualifying at the 2023 Rolex Shanghai Masters for hitting a ball at the umpire in frustration and subsequently lost all the rankings points and prize money.

Polmans made back to back semifinals at the 2023 Australian Open and 2024 Australian Opens with Olivia Gadecki as a wildcard pair. In singles, at the 2024 tournament, ranked No. 154, he also received another wildcard for the main draw and his fourth overall but lost in straight sets to compatriot Alexei Popyrin.

=== 2026: First ATP titles, Wimbledon mixed doubles final ===
Entering as a wildcard pairing, Polmans and compatriot Jason Kubler were runners-up at the Australian Open, losing to sixth seeds Christian Harrison and Neal Skupski in the final.

Playing with Romain Arneodo, he won his first ATP Tour doubles title at the Geneva Open in May, defeating Yuki Bhambri and Michael Venus in the final.

Teaming with fellow Australian player Storm Hunter, Polmans reached the mixed doubles final at Wimbledon, losing to second seeds Marcelo Arévalo and Jeļena Ostapenko in three sets.

In July, partnering Lucas Miedler, he won the doubles title at the Gstaad Open, defeating Marcelo Demoliner and Robert Galloway in the final. Six days later they overcame Jakob Schnaitter and Mark Wallner in the final to claim the trophy at the Kitzbühel Open.

== Coaching ==
Since July 2019, Polmans has been coached by Marcel du Coudray, former coach of world number 3 Nikolay Davydenko. Polmans was coached by former Top 100 player, Peter Luczak, at the Tennis Australia National Academy in Melbourne.

== Personal life ==
Polmans supports Collingwood in the Australian Football League. Recently engaged to his fiancè Jenna Laubser as of November 28th 2025.

== Performance timelines ==
Key
| W | F | SF | QF | #R | RR | Q# | P# | DNQ | A | Z# | PO | G | S | B | NMS | NTI | P | NH |

(W) winner; (F) finalist; (SF) semifinalist; (QF) quarterfinalist; (#R) rounds 4, 3, 2, 1; (RR) round-robin stage; (Q#) qualification round; (P#) preliminary round; (DNQ) did not qualify; (A) absent; (Z#) Davis/Fed Cup Zonal Group (with number indication) or (PO) play-off; (G) gold, (S) silver or (B) bronze Olympic/Paralympic medal; (NMS) not a Masters tournament; (NTI) not a Tier I tournament; (P) postponed; (NH) not held; (SR) strike rate (events won / competed); (W–L) win–loss record.
To avoid confusion and double counting, these charts are updated at the conclusion of a tournament or when the player's participation has ended.

=== Singles ===
| Tournament | 2014 | 2015 | 2016 | 2017 | 2018 | 2019 | 2020 | 2021 | 2022 | 2023 | 2024 | 2025 | 2026 | SR | W–L | Win% |
|---|---|---|---|---|---|---|---|---|---|---|---|---|---|---|---|---|
Grand Slam tournaments
| Australian Open | Q1 | Q2 | Q1 | Q1 | Q1 | 1R | 2R | 1R | Q2 | Q2 | 1R | Q2 | Q1 | 0 / 4 | 1–4 | 20% |
| French Open | A | A | A | Q2 | Q1 | Q2 | 2R | Q3 | A | Q2 | Q1 | A | A | 0 / 1 | 1–1 | 50% |
| Wimbledon | A | A | A | Q1 | Q1 | Q2 | NH | 2R | A | Q3 | Q1 | A | A | 0 / 1 | 1–1 | 50% |
| US Open | A | A | A | Q1 | Q3 | Q1 | 1R | Q1 | Q1 | Q3 | Q2 | A | A | 0 / 1 | 0–1 | 0% |
| Win–loss | 0–0 | 0–0 | 0–0 | 0–0 | 0–0 | 0–1 | 2–3 | 1–2 | 0–0 | 0–0 | 0–1 | 0–0 | 0–0 | 0 / 7 | 3–7 | 30% |
ATP Masters 1000
| Indian Wells Masters | A | A | A | A | A | A | NH | A | A | A | Q1 | A | A | 0 / 0 | 0-0 | – |
| Miami Open | A | A | A | A | A | A | NH | A | A | A | A | A | A | 0 / 0 | 0-0 | – |
| Monte-Carlo Masters | A | A | A | A | A | A | NH | A | A | A | A | A | A | 0 / 0 | 0–0 | – |
| Madrid Open | A | A | A | A | A | A | NH | A | A | A | A | A | A | 0 / 0 | 0–0 | – |
| Italian Open | A | A | A | A | A | A | Q2 | A | A | A | A | A | A | 0 / 0 | 0–0 | – |
| Canadian Open | A | A | A | A | A | Q2 | NH | A | A | A | A | A | A | 0 / 0 | 0–0 | – |
| Cincinnati Masters | A | A | A | A | A | A | A | A | A | A | A | A | A | 0 / 0 | 0–0 | – |
| Shanghai Masters | A | A | A | A | A | A | NH | | | Q2 | A | A | A | 0 / 0 | 0–0 | – |
| Paris Masters | A | A | A | A | A | A | Q1 | A | A | A | A | A | A | 0 / 0 | 0–0 | – |
| Win–loss | 0–0 | 0–0 | 0–0 | 0–0 | 0–0 | 0–0 | 0–0 | 0–0 | 0–0 | 0–0 | 0–0 | 0–0 | 0–0 | 0 / 0 | 0–0 | – |
Career statistics
| Year-end ranking | 1046 | 841 | 222 | 323 | 166 | 130 | 124 | 196 | 334 | 150 | 321 | 396 | | | | |

=== Doubles ===
| Tournament | 2017 | 2018 | 2019 | 2020 | 2021 | 2022 | 2023 | 2024 | 2025 | 2026 | SR | W–L | Win % |
|---|---|---|---|---|---|---|---|---|---|---|---|---|---|
Grand Slam tournaments
| Australian Open | SF | 1R | 1R | QF | 3R | 1R | 2R | 1R | 2R | F | 0 / 10 | 16–10 | 62% |
| French Open | A | A | A | A | A | A | A | A | A | A | 0 / 0 | 0–0 | — |
| Wimbledon | 1R | A | A | NH | A | A | A | A | A | 2R | 0 / 2 | 1–2 | 33% |
| US Open | 1R | A | A | A | 1R | A | A | A | A | 3R | 0 / 3 | 2–3 | 40% |
| Win–Loss | 4–3 | 0–1 | 0–1 | 3–1 | 2–2 | 0–1 | 1–1 | 0–1 | 1–1 | 8–3 | 0 / 15 | 19–15 | 56% |

== Grand Slam tournaments finals ==
=== Doubles: 1 (runner-up) ===
| Result | Year | Tournament | Surface | Partner | Opponents | Score |
|---|---|---|---|---|---|---|
| Loss | 2026 | Australian Open | Hard | (Australia) Jason Kubler | (United States) Christian Harrison (United Kingdom) Neal Skupski | 6–7^{(4–7)}, 4–6 |

=== Mixed doubles: 1 (1 runner-up) ===
| Result | Year | Tournament | Surface | Partner | Opponents | Score |
|---|---|---|---|---|---|---|
| Loss | 2026 | Wimbledon | Grass | (Australia) Storm Hunter | (El Salvador) Marcelo Arévalo (Latvia) Jeļena Ostapenko | 6–4, 5–7, 2–6 |

== ATP Tour finals ==
=== Doubles: 4 (3 titles, 1 runner-up) ===
| Legend Grand Slam (0–1) ATP 1000 (–) ATP 500 (–) ATP 250 (3–0) | Finals by surface Hard (0–1) Clay (3–0) Grass (–) | Finals by setting Outdoor (3–1) Indoor (–) |

| Result | W–L | Date | Tournament | Tier | Surface | Partner | Opponents | Score |
|---|---|---|---|---|---|---|---|---|
| Loss | 0–1 | Jan 2026 | Australian Open, Australia | Grand Slam | Hard | (Australia) Jason Kubler | (United States) Christian Harrison (United Kingdom) Neal Skupski | 6–7^{(4–7)}, 4–6 |
| Win | 1–1 | May 2026 | Geneva Open, Switzerland | ATP 250 | Clay | (Monaco) Romain Arneodo | (India) Yuki Bhambri (New Zealand) Michael Venus | 3–6, 7–6^{(7–2)}, [10–7] |
| Win | 2–1 | Jul 2026 | Swiss Open Gstaad, Switzerland | ATP 250 | Clay | (Austria) Lucas Miedler | (Brazil) Marcelo Demoliner (United States) Robert Galloway | 6–4, 6–3 |
| Win | 3–1 | Jul 2026 | Austrian Open Kitzbühel, Austria | ATP 250 | Clay | (Austria) Lucas Miedler | (Germany) Jakob Schnaitter (Germany) Mark Wallner | 6–2, 6–2 |

== ATP Challenger and ITF Tour finals ==
=== Singles: 31 (15–16) ===
| Legend ATP Challenger Tour (3–7) ITF Futures/World Tennis Tour (12–9) | Finals by surface Hard (8–11) Clay (5–5) Grass (2–0) |

| Result | W–L | Date | Tournament | Tier | Surface | Opponent | Score |
|---|---|---|---|---|---|---|---|
| Win | 1–0 | Jun 2016 | Mozambique F1, Maputo | Futures | Hard | (South Africa) Lloyd Harris | 4–6, 6–2, 7–5 |
| Win | 2–0 | Jun 2016 | Mozambique F2, Maputo | Futures | Hard | (Australia) Jeremy Beale | 6–1, 6–1 |
| Loss | 2–1 | Jun 2016 | Zimbabwe F1, Harare | Futures | Hard | (Zimbabwe) Benjamin Lock | 7–5, 6–7^{(5–7)}, 5–7 |
| Win | 3–1 | Jul 2016 | Zimbabwe F2, Harare | Futures | Clay | (South Africa) Lloyd Harris | 6–2, 6–2 |
| Loss | 3–2 | Jul 2016 | USA F25, Edwardsville | Futures | Hard | (United States) Tennys Sandgren | 6–7^{(4–7)}, 6–1, 3–6 |
| Loss | 3–3 | Aug 2016 | USA F26, Decatur | Futures | Clay | (Ecuador) Roberto Quiroz | 0–6, 6–3, 6–7^{(6–8)} |
| Win | 4–3 | Sep 2016 | Australia F5, Alice Springs | Futures | Hard | (United States) Jarmere Jenkins | 6–1, 6–7^{(3–7)}, 7–6^{(7–4)} |
| Loss | 4–4 | Oct 2016 | Australia F6, Brisbane | Futures | Hard | (United States) Jarmere Jenkins | 1–6, 5–7 |
| Loss | 4–5 | Nov 2016 | Canberra, Australia | Challenger | Hard | (Australia) James Duckworth | 5–7, 3–6 |
| Win | 5–5 | Mar 2017 | Australia F2, Canberra | Futures | Clay | (Australia) Blake Mott | 7–6^{(7–2)}, 3–6, 6–4 |
| Win | 6–5 | Mar 2017 | Australia F3, Canberra | Futures | Clay | (Australia) Maverick Banes | 6–7^{(5–7)}, 7–6^{(7–1)}, 6–4 |
| Loss | 6–6 | May 2017 | Italy F11, Santa Margherita di Pula | Futures | Clay | (Switzerland) Adrian Bodmer | 3–6, 2–6 |
| Win | 7–6 | Feb 2018 | Launceston, Australia | Challenger | Hard | (Australia) Bradley Mousley | 6–2, 6–2 |
| Win | 8–6 | Mar 2018 | Australia F1, Renmark | Futures | Grass | (Australia) Luke Saville | 6–1, 6–4 |
| Win | 9–6 | Mar 2018 | Australia F2, Mildura | Futures | Grass | (Australia) Thomas Fancutt | 7–6^{(7–4)}, 6–3 |
| Win | 10–6 | Mar 2018 | Australia F3, Mornington | Futures | Clay | (Australia) Max Purcell | 7–6^{(7–5)}, 6–2 |
| Loss | 10–7 | Apr 2018 | Australia F4, Mornington | Futures | Clay | (Australia) Max Purcell | 5–7, 4–6 |
| Loss | 10–8 | Apr 2018 | Tallahassee, USA | Challenger | Clay | (United States) Noah Rubin | 2–6, 6–3, 4–6 |
| Loss | 10–9 | Oct 2018 | Stockton, USA | Challenger | Hard | (South Africa) Lloyd Harris | 2–6, 2–6 |
| Win | 11–9 | Mar 2019 | Zhangjiagang, China, P.R. | Challenger | Hard | (Italy) Lorenzo Giustino | 6–4, 4–6, 7–6^{(7–4)} |
| Loss | 11–10 | Sep 2019 | Kaohsiung, Taiwan | Challenger | Hard | (Australia) John Millman | 4–6, 2–6 |
| Win | 12–10 | Oct 2019 | Traralgon, Australia | Challenger | Hard | (Australia) Andrew Harris | 7–5, 6–3 |
| Loss | 12–11 | Oct 2022 | Sydney, Australia | Challenger | Hard | (Chinese Taipei) Hsu Yu-hsiou | 4–6, 6–7^{(5–7)} |
| Win | 13–11 | Mar 2023 | M25 Canberra, Australia | World Tennis Tour | Clay | (Japan) Tatsuma Ito | 6–0, 4–6, 6–4 |
| Loss | 13–12 | Mar 2023 | M25 Canberra, Australia | World Tennis Tour | Clay | (Australia) Dane Sweeny | 7–6^{(7–1)}, 6–7^{(5–7)}, 4–6 |
| Loss | 13–13 | Sep 2023 | Guangzhou, China | Challenger | Hard | (France) Térence Atmane | 6–4, 6–7^{(7–9)}, 4–6 |
| Loss | 13–14 | Oct 2023 | Sydney, Australia | Challenger | Hard | (Japan) Taro Daniel | 2–6, 4–6 |
| Loss | 13–15 | Oct 2024 | M25 Cairns, Australia | World Tennis Tour | Hard | (Australia) Omar Jasika | 3–6, 4–6 |
| Loss | 13–16 | Sep 2025 | M25 Tamworth, Australia | World Tennis Tour | Hard | (Australia) Dane Sweeny | 6–2, 4–6, 3–6 |
| Win | 14–16 | Oct 2025 | M25 Perth, Australia | World Tennis Tour | Hard | (Japan) Kaichi Uchida | 3–6, 6–4, 7–6^{(8–6)} |
| Win | 15–16 | Oct 2025 | M25 Brisbane, Australia | World Tennis Tour | Hard | (Australia) Dane Sweeny | 1–6, 7–6^{(7–2)}, 6–3 |

=== Doubles: 31 (23–8) ===
| Legend ATP Challenger Tour (11–4) ITF Futures Tour (12–4) | Finals by surface Hard (15–6) Clay (6–2) Grass (2–0) |

| Result | W–L | Date | Tournament | Tier | Surface | Partner | Opponents | Score |
|---|---|---|---|---|---|---|---|---|
| Win | 1–0 | Nov 2014 | Australia F9, Wollongong | Futures | Hard | (Australia) Steven de Waard | (United States) Mitchell Krueger (Australia) Andrew Whittington | 7–6^{(7–2)}, 7–6^{(7–2)} |
| Loss | 1–1 | Mar 2015 | Australia F4, Melbourne | Futures | Clay | (Australia) Steven de Waard | (New Zealand) Jordan Thompson (Australia) Andrew Whittington | 2–6, 6–7^{(5–7)} |
| Win | 2–1 | Apr 2015 | Australia F5, Mornington | Futures | Clay | (Australia) Steven de Waard | (Australia) Matthew Barton (Germany) Peter Torebko | 7–6^{(8–6)}, 6–1 |
| Win | 3–1 | May 2015 | Italy F11, Lecco | Futures | Clay | (Australia) Peter Luczak | (Netherlands) David Pel (France) Maxime Tabatruong | 6–4, 6–2 |
| Win | 4–1 | Jul 2015 | Belgium F6, Knokke | Futures | Clay | (Australia) Steven de Waard | (Australia) Maverick Banes (Australia) Jacob Grills | 5–7, 7–6^{(7–2)}, [10–5] |
| Win | 5–1 | Oct 2015 | Australia F8, Toowoomba | Futures | Hard | (Australia) Steven de Waard | (Australia) Jake Delaney (Australia) Max Purcell | 6–4, 6–3 |
| Win | 6–1 | Oct 2015 | Australia F9, Brisbane | Futures | Hard | (Australia) Steven de Waard | (Australia) Thomas Fancutt (Australia) Darren Polkinghorne | 6–0, 6–1 |
| Loss | 6–2 | Nov 2015 | Australia F10, Wollongong | Futures | Hard | (Australia) Steven de Waard | (Australia) Maverick Banes (New Zealand) Finn Tearney | 7–6^{(8–6)}, 5–7, [6–10] |
| Win | 7–2 | Nov 2015 | Australia F11, Wollongong | Futures | Hard | (Australia) Steven de Waard | (Australia) Ashley Fisher (Australia) Dayne Kelly | 6–2, 4–6, [10–7] |
| Loss | 7–3 | Feb 2016 | Australia F1, Port Pirie | Futures | Hard | (New Zealand) Jose Statham | (Australia) Alex Bolt (Australia) Andrew Whittington | 6–7^{(1–7)}, 3–6 |
| Win | 8–3 | Mar 2016 | Australia F2, Mildura | Futures | Grass | (Australia) Steven de Waard | (Australia) Alex Bolt (Australia) Andrew Whittington | 6–3, 6–7^{(9–11)}, [10–6] |
| Win | 9–3 | Mar 2016 | Australia F4, Mornington | Futures | Hard | (Australia) Steven de Waard | (Australia) Bradley Mousley (Australia) Gavin van Peperzeel | 6–2, 6–3 |
| Loss | 9–4 | Apr 2016 | Tallahassee, USA | Challenger | Clay | (Australia) Peter Luczak | (United States) Dennis Novikov (Chile) Julio Peralta | 6–3, 4–6, [10–12] |
| Loss | 9–5 | Jul 2016 | USA F25, Edwardsville | Futures | Hard | (United Kingdom) Luke Bambridge | (United States) Conor Smith (United States) Jackson Withrow | 3–6, 2–6 |
| Win | 10–5 | Sep 2016 | Australia F5, Alice Springs | Futures | Hard | (Australia) Luke Saville | (Australia) Thomas Fancutt (Australia) Calum Puttergill | 6–1, 6–2 |
| Win | 11–5 | Oct 2016 | Australia F8, Cairns | Futures | Hard | (Australia) Luke Saville | (United States) Nathan Pasha (Australia) Darren Polkinghorne | 4–6, 6–3, [10–7] |
| Loss | 11–6 | Jan 2017 | Happy Valley, Australia | Challenger | Hard | (Australia) Steven de Waard | (United States) Max Schnur (Chile) Hans Podlipnik Castillo | 6–7^{(5–7)}, 6–4, [6–10] |
| Win | 12–6 | Mar 2017 | Australia F3, Canberra | Futures | Clay | (Australia) Bradley Mousley | (Australia) Steven de Waard (Australia) Scott Puodziunas | 6–4, 7–6^{(7–4)} |
| Loss | 12–7 | Aug 2018 | Lexington, USA | Challenger | Hard | (Belgium) Joris De Loore | (United States) Robert Galloway (Colombia) Roberto Maytín | 3–6, 1–6 |
| Loss | 12–8 | Aug 2018 | Vancouver, Canada | Challenger | Hard | (Australia) Max Purcell | (United Kingdom) Luke Bambridge (United Kingdom) Neal Skupski | 6–4, 3–6, [6–10] |
| Win | 13–8 | Oct 2018 | Traralgon, Australia | Challenger | Hard | (Australia) Jeremy Beale | (Australia) Max Purcell (Australia) Luke Saville | 6–2, 6–4 |
| Win | 14–8 | Jul 2019 | Gatineau, Canada | Challenger | Hard | (United States) Alex Lawson | (United States) Dennis Novikov (Mexico) Hans Hach Verdugo | 6–4, 3–6, [10–7] |
| Win | 15–8 | Oct 2019 | Ningbo, China | Challenger | Hard | (Australia) Andrew Harris | (Australia) Alex Bolt (Australia) Matt Reid | 6–0, 6–1 |
| Win | 16–8 | May 2021 | Ostrava, Czech Republic | Challenger | Clay | (Ukraine) Sergiy Stakhovsky | (Czech Republic) Andrew Paulson (Czech Republic) Patrik Rikl | 7–6^{(7–4)}, 3–6, [10–7] |
| Win | 17–8 | May 2021 | Prague, Czech Republic | Challenger | Clay | (Ukraine) Sergiy Stakhovsky | (Croatia) Ivan Sabanov (Croatia) Matej Sabanov | 6-3, 6–4 |
| Win | 18–8 | June 2021 | Nottingham, UK | Challenger | Grass | (Australia) Matt Reid | (France) Benjamin Bonzi (France) Antoine Hoang | 6–4, 4–6, [10–8] |
| Win | 19–8 | Oct 2022 | Busan, South Korea | Challenger | Hard | (Australia) Max Purcell | (South Korea) Nam Ji-sung (South Korea) Song Min-kyu | 6–7^{(5–7)}, 6–2, [12–10] |
| Win | 20–8 | Feb 2023 | Burnie, Australia | Challenger | Hard | (Australia) Max Purcell | (Australia) Luke Saville (Australia) Tristan Schoolkate | 7–6^{(7–4)}, 6–4 |
| Win | 21–8 | Nov 2025 | Sydney, Australia | Challenger | Hard | (Australia) Rinky Hijikata | (Australia) Calum Puttergill (Australia) Dane Sweeny | 6–0, 6–4 |
| Win | 22–8 | Feb 2026 | Brisbane, Australia | Challenger | Hard | (Australia) Blake Bayldon | (Australia) Jake Delaney (Australia) Dane Sweeny | 6–4, 6–4 |
| Win | 23–8 | Feb 2026 | Brisbane, Australia | Challenger | Hard | (Australia) Jake Delaney | (Australia) Matt Hulme (Australia) Kody Pearson | 6–2, 6–3 |

== Junior Grand Slam finals ==
=== Doubles: 1 (title) ===
| Result | Year | Tournament | Surface | Partner | Opponent | Score |
|---|---|---|---|---|---|---|
| Win | 2015 | Australian Open | Hard | (Australia) Jake Delaney | (Poland) Hubert Hurkacz (Slovakia) Alex Molčan | 0–6, 6–2, [10–8] |
