= Patrick Harper =

Australian tennis player (born 2000)

- Country (sports): Australia
- Born: 28 January 2000 (age 26) Rockhampton, Australia
- Height: 1.83 m (6 ft 0 in)
- Plays: Right-handed
- College: Tennessee
- Prize money: $48,601

Singles
- Career record: 0–0
- Career titles: 0
- Highest ranking: No. 1,673 (30 April 2018)

Doubles
- Career record: 0–0
- Career titles: 6 Challengers, 3 ITF
- Highest ranking: No. 115 (12 January 2026)
- Current ranking: No. 115 (19 January 2026)

Grand Slam doubles results
- Australian Open: 1R (2026)
- Last updated on: 19 January 2026.

Patrick Harper (born 28 January 2000) is an Australian tennis player.

Harper has a career high ATP singles ranking of No. 1,673 achieved on 30 April 2018 and a career high ATP doubles ranking of No. 115 achieved on 12 January 2026.

Harper has won three ATP Challenger doubles titles at the 2024 Knoxville Challenger and the Columbus Challenger, both with Johannus Monday, and the 2025 Queensland International II with Joshua Charlton.

Harper played college tennis at Tennessee, where he won the 2021 NCAA doubles title with Adam Walton.

== ATP Challenger and ITF Tour Finals ==
=== Doubles: 18 (9 titles, 9 runner-ups) ===
Legend (doubles) ATP Challenger Tour (6–6) Futures/ITF World Tennis Tour (3–3)	Finals by surface Hard (9–6) Clay (0–3) Grass (0–0) Carpet (0–0)

Result	W–L	Date	Tournament	Tier	Surface	Partner	Opponents	Score
Win	1–0	Jul 2023	M25 Decatur, USA	World Tour	Hard	(Japan) Shunsuke Mitsui	(United States) Jacob Brumm (United States) Ezekiel Clark	7–6^{(7–2)}, 6–4
Loss	1–1	Aug 2023	M25 Southaven, USA	World Tour	Hard	(Japan) Shunsuke Mitsui	(United States) Ryan Seggerman (United States) Patrik Trhac	4–6, 3–6
Win	2–1	Sep 2023	M25 Bagneres-de-Bigorre, France	World Tour	Hard	(Germany) Mark Wallner	(France) Robin Bertrand (United Kingdom) Millen Hurrion	3–6, 6–3, [10–7]
Win	3–1	Sep 2023	M25 Plaisir, France	World Tour	Hard	(Germany) Mark Wallner	(United States) Jack Vance (United States) Tennyson Whiting	6–4, 7–6^{(7–3)}
Loss	3–2	Mar 2024	M25 Bakersfield, USA	World Tour	Hard	(United Kingdom) Emile Hudd	(Denmark) August Holmgren (United States) Nathan Ponwith	1–6, 6–7^{(4–7)}
Loss	3–3	Apr 2024	San Miguel de Tucuman, Argentina	Challenger	Clay	(United Kingdom) David Stevenson	(Brazil) Luís Britto (Argentina) Gonzalo Villanueva	3–6, 2–6
Loss	3–4	Apr 2024	Concepcion, Chile	Challenger	Clay	(United Kingdom) David Stevenson	(Japan) Seita Watanabe (Japan) Takeru Yuzuki	1–6, 6–7^{(6–8)}
Loss	3–5	Apr 2024	Porto Alegre, Brazil	Challenger	Clay	(United Kingdom) David Stevenson	(Dominican Republic) Roberto Cid Subervi (Japan) Kaichi Uchida	7–5, 6–7^{(1–7)}, [6–10]
Win	4–5	Oct 2024	Knoxville, USA	Challenger	Hard	(United Kingdom) Johannus Monday	(United States) Micah Braswell (United States) Eliot Spizzirri	6–2, 6–2
Loss	4–6	Nov 2024	M25 Austin, USA	World Tour	Hard	(Canada) Cleeve Harper	(Belgium) Pierre-Yves Bailly (United States) Stefan Dostanic	5–7, 3–6
Loss	4–7	Jan 2025	Brisbane, Australia	Challenger	Hard	(Australia) Joshua Charlton	(Australia) Matthew Romios (Northern Mariana Islands) Colin Sinclair	6–7^{2–7}, 5–7
Win	5–7	Feb 2025	Brisbane, Australia	Challenger	Hard	(Australia) Joshua Charlton	(Australia) Matt Hulme (Australia) James Watt	4–6, 7–6^{(7–5)}, [12–10]
Loss	5–8	Jun 2025	Cary, USA	Challenger	Hard	(United States) Trey Hilderbrand	(Australia) Finn Reynolds (Australia) James Watt	3–6, 7–6^{(7–1)}, [5–10]
Win	6–8	Sep 2025	Columbus, USA	Challenger	Hard (i)	(United Kingdom) Johannus Monday	(United States) George Goldhoff (United States) Theodore Winegar	6–4, 6–3
Win	7–8	Oct 2025	Lincoln, USA	Challenger	Hard	(United Kingdom) Johannus Monday	(India) Aryan Shah (India) Dhakshineswar Suresh	6–4, 7–5
Win	8–8	Nov 2025	Knoxville, USA	Challenger	Hard (i)	(United States) Quinn Vandecasteele	(United States) Mitchell Krueger (Antigua and Barbuda) Jody Maginley	6–7^{(6–8)}, 7–6^{(7–4)}, [12–10]
Win	9–8	Nov 2025	Champaign, USA	Challenger	Hard (i)	(Japan) Shunsuke Mitsui	(United States) Ryan Seggerman (United States) Keegan Smith	7–5, 6–7^{(3–7)}, [12–10]
Loss	9–9	Jan 2026	Canberra, Australia	Challenger	Hard	(Australia) Blake Bayldon	(United States) Mac Kiger (United States) Reese Stalder	6–7^{(3–7)}, 3–6
