= Queensland International =

Brisbane Tennis International
- 2026 River City Challenger

Tournament information
- Location: Brisbane, Australia
- Venue: Queensland Tennis Centre (QTC)
- Surface: Hard
ATP Tour
- Category: ATP Challenger Tour
- Draw: 32S/24Q/16D
- Prize money: Challenger 75
WTA Tour
- Category: ITF Women's Circuit
- Draw: 32S/16D
- Prize money: W75-W50

The Brisbane Tennis International is a professional tennis tournament played on hardcourts. It is currently part of the ATP Challenger Tour and ITF Women's World Tennis Tour. It was first held in Brisbane, Australia in 2025.

== Past finals ==
=== Men's singles ===
Year	Champion	Runner-up	Score
2026 (3)	(Denmark) August Holmgren	(United States) Christian Langmo	7–6^{(7–5)}, 6–2
2026 (2)	(China) Zhang Zhizhen	(Australia) Alex Bolt	6–2, 6–4
2026 (1)	(Australia) Dane Sweeny	(Australia) Tristan Schoolkate	3–6, 7–6^{(7–5)}, 7–6^{(7–4)}
2025 (3)	(Australia) Alex Bolt	(Chinese Taipei) Wu Tung-lin	6–3, 6–3
2025 (2)	(Australia) Adam Walton	(Australia) Jason Kubler	7–6^{(8–6)}, 7–6^{(7–4)}
2025 (1)	(Australia) Tristan Schoolkate	(Czech Republic) Marek Gengel	7–6^{(7–3)}, 7–6^{(7–4)}

=== Men's doubles ===
Year	Champions	Runners-up	Score
2026 (3)	(Australia) Blake Ellis (Australia) Li Tu	(United States) Alafia Ayeni (Japan) Kokoro Isomura	6–7^{(4–7)}, 6–4, [12–10]
2026 (2)	(Australia) Jake Delaney (Australia) Marc Polmans	(Australia) Matt Hulme (Australia) Kody Pearson	6–2, 6–3
2026 (1)	(Australia) Blake Bayldon (Australia) Marc Polmans	(Australia) Jake Delaney (Australia) Dane Sweeny	6–4, 6–4
2025 (3)	(Australia) Matt Hulme (Australia) Kody Pearson	(India) Anirudh Chandrasekar (United States) Reese Stalder	7–6^{(7–5)}, 3–6, [10–6]
2025 (2)	(Australia) Joshua Charlton (Australia) Patrick Harper	(Australia) Matt Hulme (New Zealand) James Watt	4–6, 7–6^{(7–5)}, [12–10]
2025 (1)	(Australia) Matthew Romios (Northern Mariana Islands) Colin Sinclair	(Australia) Joshua Charlton (Australia) Patrick Harper	7–6^{(7–2)}, 7–5

=== Women's singles ===
Year	Champion	Runner-up	Score
2026 (2)	(Australia) Emerson Jones	(China) Zhu Lin	6–4, 7–5
2026 (1)	(Australia) Talia Gibson	(Japan) Nao Hibino	6–3, 7–6^{(9–7)}
2025 (3)	(United Kingdom) Katie Swan	(China) Wei Sijia	3–6, 6–3, 6–3
2025 (2)	(Australia) Kimberly Birrell	(Australia) Maddison Inglis	6–2, 4–6, 7–6^{(7–2)}
2025 (1)	(Australia) Priscilla Hon	(Switzerland) Leonie Küng	6–4, 4–6, 6–2

=== Women's doubles ===
Year	Champions	Runners-up	Score
2026 (2)	(Japan) Natsumi Kawaguchi (Japan) Sara Saito	(Australia) Gabriella Da Silva-Fick (Australia) Tenika McGiffin	6–2, 6–4
2026 (1)	(Japan) Hayu Kinoshita (China) Zhang Ying	(Australia) Petra Hule (Australia) Elena Micic	7–6^{(7–5)}, 7–5
2025 (3)	(Australia) Destanee Aiava (Australia) Maddison Inglis	(Australia) Gabriella Da Silva-Fick (Australia) Tenika McGiffin	7–6^{(7–3)}, 7–6^{(9–7)}
2025 (2)	(Japan) Miho Kuramochi (China) Zheng Wushuang	(France) Tessah Andrianjafitrimo (Norway) Malene Helgø	7–6^{(8–6)}, 6–3.
2025 (1)	(Australia) Petra Hule (Australia) Elena Micic	(Australia) Lizette Cabrera (Australia) Taylah Preston	2–6, 6–2, [10–6]
