= Jesse Delaney =

Australian tennis player (born 1998)

- Country (sports): Australia
- Born: 14 November 1998 (age 27) Sydney, Australia
- Height: 1.73 m (5 ft 8 in)
- Plays: Right-handed (two-handed backhand)
- Coach: Ricky Bobby
- Prize money: US $83,195

Singles
- Career record: 0–0 (at ATP Tour level, Grand Slam level and in Davis Cup)
- Career titles: 0
- Highest ranking: No. 833 (8 September 2025)
- Current ranking: No. 1,117 (26 October 2026)

Doubles
- Career record: 0–0 (at ATP Tour level, Grand Slam level and in Davis Cup)
- Career titles: 1 Challenger, 10 ITF
- Highest ranking: No. 215 (26 October 2026)
- Current ranking: No. 215 (26 October 2026)
- Last updated on: 26 October 2026.

Jesse Delaney (born 14 November 1998) is an Australian tennis player. He has a career high ATP singles ranking of No. 833 achieved on 8 September 2025 and a career high ATP doubles ranking of No. 215 achieved on 26 October 2026.

Delaney has won one ATP Challenger doubles title at the 2026 Shanghai Challenger.

== Personal life ==
He is the younger brother of professional tennis player Jake Delaney.
