= Joshua Charlton =

Australian tennis player (born 1999)

- Country (sports): Australia
- Born: 29 July 1999 (age 27) Traralgon, Australia
- Height: 1.91 m (6 ft 3 in)
- Plays: Left-handed (two-handed backhand)
- College: Oregon
- Prize money: US $75,307

Singles
- Career record: 0–0 (at ATP Tour level, Grand Slam level, and in Davis Cup)
- Career titles: 0
- Highest ranking: No. 741 (18 May 2026)
- Current ranking: No. 827 (19 October 2026)

Doubles
- Career record: 0–0 (at ATP Tour level, Grand Slam level, and in Davis Cup)
- Career titles: 1 Challenger, 9 ITF
- Highest ranking: No. 174 (19 October 2026)
- Current ranking: No. 174 (19 October 2026)
- Last updated on: 19 October 2026.

Joshua Charlton (born 29 July 1999) is an Australian tennis player. Charlton has a career high ATP singles ranking of No. 741 achieved on 18 May 2026 and a career high ATP doubles ranking of No. 174 achieved on 19 October 2026.

Charlton has won one ATP Challenger doubles title at the 2025 Queensland International II, partnering Patrick Harper to defeat Matt Hulme and James Watt in the final.

Charlton played college tennis at Oregon.
