= Jake Delaney =

Australian tennis player (born 1997)

- Country (sports): Australia
- Residence: Sydney, Australia
- Born: 14 May 1997 (age 29) Sydney, Australia
- Height: 1.85 m (6 ft 1 in)
- Plays: Right-handed (two-handed backhand)
- Coach: George Costanza
- Prize money: US $184,094

Singles
- Career record: 0–0
- Career titles: 0
- Highest ranking: No. 338 (9 November 2026)
- Current ranking: No. 338 (9 November 2026)

Doubles
- Career record: 0–0
- Career titles: 0
- Highest ranking: No. 136 (2 November 2026)
- Current ranking: No. 136 (2 November 2026)
- Last updated on: 9 November 2026.

Jake Delaney (born 14 May 1997, in Sydney) is an Australian tennis player. He has a career-high ATP singles ranking of No. 338 achieved on 9 November 2026 and a best doubles ranking of No. 136 achieved on 2 November 2026.

== ATP Challenger Tour finals ==
=== Doubles: 7 (4 title, 3 runner-up) ===
Legend ATP Challenger Tour (4–3)

Result	W–L	Date	Tournament	Tier	Surface	Partner	Opponents	Score
Loss	0–1	Oct 2024	Playford Tennis International, Australia	Challenger	Hard	(Australia) Jesse Delaney	(New Zealand) Blake Ellis (Australia) Thomas Fancutt	1–6, 7–5, [5–10]
Win	1–1	Nov 2025	Playford Tennis International, Australia	Challenger	Hard	(Australia) Li Tu	(India) Anirudh Chandrasekar (United States) Reese Stalder	6–7^{(5–7)}, 7–5, [10–8]
Loss	1–2	Jan 2026	BNC Tennis Open, New Caledonia	Challenger	Hard	(Australia) Calum Puttergill	(Japan) Yusuke Kusuhara (Japan) Shunsuke Nakagawa	5–7, 3–6
Loss	1–3	Feb 2026	Queensland International, Australia	Challenger	Hard	(Australia) Dane Sweeny	(Australia) Blake Bayldon (Australia) Marc Polmans	4–6, 4–6
Win	2–3	Feb 2026	Queensland International, Australia	Challenger	Hard	(Australia) Marc Polmans	(Australia) Matt Hulme (Australia) Kody Pearson	6–2, 6–3
Win	3–3	Mar 2026	Banorte Tennis Open, Mexico	Challenger	Clay	(Australia) Tristan Schoolkate	(Argentina) Facundo Mena (Mexico) Rodrigo Pacheco Méndez	6–4, 7–6^{(7–2)}
Win	4–3	Sep 2026	Shanghai Challenger, China	Challenger	Hard	(Australia) Jesse Delaney	Petr Bar Biryukov (Italy) Alexander Binda	6–4, 7–6^{(7–2)}

== ITF Tour finals ==
=== Singles: 12 (6 titles, 6 runner-ups) ===
Legend ITF WTT (6–6)	Finals by surface Hard (6–5) Clay (0–1)

Result	W–L	Date	Tournament	Tier	Surface	Opponent	Score
Loss	0–1	Sep 2023	M25 Darwin, Australia	WTT	Hard	(Australia) Blake Mott	2–6, 6–2, 3–6
Loss	0–2	Oct 2023	M25 Cairns, Australia	WTT	Hard	(Australia) Omar Jasika	7–6^{(7–4)}, 4–6, 4–6
Win	1–2	Jun 2024	M15 Harmon, Guam (US)	WTT	Hard	(Japan) Ryuki Matsuda	6–7^{(4–7)}, 7–5, 6–3
Loss	1–3	Jun 2024	M15 Hong Kong, Hong Kong (China SAR)	WTT	Hard	(Japan) Shintaro Imai	4–6, 4–6
Loss	1–4	Sep 2024	M25 Darwin, Australia	WTT	Hard	(Australia) Omar Jasika	5–7, 5–7
Win	2–4	Jul 2025	M15 Nakhon Pathom, Thailand	WTT	Hard	(Japan) Takuya Kumasaka	6–2, 6–2
Win	3–4	May 2026	M15 Wuning, China	WTT	Hard	(South Korea) Park Ui-sung	7–5, 6–4
Loss	3–5	May 2026	M15 Karuizawa, Japan	WTT	Clay	(United States) Evan Zhu	6–2, 4–6, 2–6
Win	4–5	Jun 2026	M15 Harmon, Guam (US)	WTT	Hard	(Morocco) Youssef Kadiri Hassani	6–3, 4–6, 6–3
Win	5–5	Jun 2026	M15 Tokyo, Japan	WTT	Hard	(Japan) Masamichi Imamura	6–1, 6–4
Loss	5–6	Jul 2026	M25 Brisbane, Australia	WTT	Hard	(Australia) Matt Hulme	6–7^{(5–7)}, 6–2, 6–7^{(9–11)}
Win	6–6	Jul 2026	M15 Brisbane, Australia	WTT	Hard	(Australia) Matthew Dellavedova	7–5, 6–3

=== Doubles: 17 (8 titles, 9 runner-ups) ===
Legend ITF Futures/WTT (8–9)	Finals by surface Hard (8–9) Clay (–) Grass (–)

Result	W–L	Date	Tournament	Tier	Surface	Partner	Opponents	Score
Loss	0–1	Oct 2015	Australia F8, Toowoomba	Futures	Hard	(Australia) Max Purcell	(Australia) Steven de Waard (Australia) Marc Polmans	4–6, 3–6
Loss	0–2	Jun 2018	Guam F1, Tumon	Futures	Hard	(Australia) Thomas Fancutt	(Japan) Hiroyasu Ehara (Japan) Sho Katayama	3–6, 3–6
Win	1–2	Oct 2019	M25 Brisbane, Australia	WTT	Hard	(Australia) Luke Saville	(Philippines) Francis Alcantara (Australia) Harry Bourchier	6–1, 3–6, [10–6]
Loss	1–3	Nov 2019	M15 Maputo, Mozambique	WTT	Hard	(Mozambique) Bruno Nhavene	(Zimbabwe) Benjamin Lock (Zimbabwe) Courtney John Lock	4–6, 3–6
Win	2–3	Dec 2022	M15 Wellington, New Zealand	WTT	Hard	(New Zealand) Finn Reynolds	(New Zealand) Isaac Becroft (Australia) Kody Pearson	6–2, 6–7^{(4–7)}, [10–8]
Win	3–3	Aug 2024	M25 Nakhon Si Thammarat, Thailand	WTT	Hard	(Australia) Jesse Delaney	(India) Sai Karteek Reddy Ganta (Thailand) Wishaya Trongcharoenchaikul	6–7^{(5–7)}, 6–4, [10–7]
Win	4–3	Sep 2024	M25 Nakhon Si Thammarat, Thailand	WTT	Hard	(Australia) Jesse Delaney	(India) Sai Karteek Reddy Ganta (United States) Nick Chappell	7–6^{(7–4)}, 7–6^{(7–3)}
Win	5–3	Sep 2024	M25 Darwin, Australia	WTT	Hard	(Australia) Joshua Charlton	(New Zealand) James Watt (Australia) Matt Hulme	6–3, 6–4
Win	6–3	Sep 2024	M25 Darwin, Australia	WTT	Hard	(Australia) Jesse Delaney	(New Zealand) James Watt (Australia) Matt Hulme	6–4, 6–4
Loss	6–4	Oct 2024	M25 Cairns, Australia	WTT	Hard	(Australia) Jesse Delaney	(Belgium) Tibo Colson (Netherlands) Thijmen Loof	3–6, 2–6
Win	7–4	Nov 2024	M25 Caloundra, Australia	WTT	Hard	(Australia) Jesse Delaney	(Australia) Joshua Charlton (United Kingdom) Emile Hudd	6–3, 6–3
Loss	7–5	Mar 2025	M25 Swan Hill, Australia	WTT	Hard	(Australia) Jesse Delaney	(Australia) Joshua Charlton (Australia) Ajeet Rai	4–6, 4–6
Loss	7–6	Jul 2025	M15 Nakhon Pathom, Thailand	WTT	Hard	(Japan) Ryotaro Taguchi	(South Korea) Park Ui-sung (Thailand) Wishaya Trongcharoenchaikul	6–7^{5–7}, 6–2, [6–10]
Loss	7–7	Sep 2025	M25 Tamworth, Australia	WTT	Hard	(Australia) Jesse Delaney	(Australia) Joshua Charlton (Australia) Calum Puttergill	1–6, 7–6^{7–5}, [9–11]
Win	8–7	May 2026	M15 Wuning, China	WTT	Hard	(Australia) Jesse Delaney	(South Korea) Choe Jae-sung (South Korea) Park Ui-sung	6–2, 6–7^{(4–7)}, [10–7]
Loss	8–8	Jun 2026	M15 Tokyo, Japan	WTT	Hard	(Japan) Yusuke Kusuhara	(United States) Hunter Heck (Mexico) Alan Magadán	3–6, 2–6
Loss	8–9	Jun 2026	M15 Tokyo, Japan	WTT	Hard	(Japan) Shunsuke Nakagawa	(Japan) Yusuke Kusuhara (Australia) Max Purcell	7–5^{(7–3)}, 3–6, [9–11]

== Junior Grand Slam finals ==
=== Doubles: 1 (1 title) ===
Result	Year	Tournament	Surface	Partner	Opponents	Score
Win	2015	Australian Open	Hard	(Australia) Marc Polmans	(Poland) Hubert Hurkacz (Slovakia) Alex Molčan	0–6, 6–2, [10–8]
