= Alex Bolt =

Australian professional tennis player (born 1993)

- Bolt at 2026 Wimbledon Championships
- Country (sports): Australia
- Born: 5 January 1993 (age 33) Murray Bridge, Australia
- Height: 1.83 m (6 ft 0 in)
- Turned pro: 2011
- Plays: Left-handed (two-handed backhand)
- Coach: Jaymon Crabb, Aiden Hill
- Prize money: US $2,326,955

Singles
- Career record: 18–35
- Career titles: 0
- Highest ranking: No. 125 (4 March 2019)
- Current ranking: No. 209 (16 November 2026)

Grand Slam singles results
- Australian Open: 3R (2019)
- French Open: Q1 (2013, 2015, 2018, 2019, 2020, 2021, 2023, 2025, 2026)
- Wimbledon: 2R (2021)
- US Open: Q3 (2018)

Doubles
- Career record: 16–21
- Career titles: 0
- Highest ranking: No. 81 (15 January 2018)
- Current ranking: No. 943 (16 November 2026)

Grand Slam doubles results
- Australian Open: QF (2014, 2017)
- Wimbledon: 1R (2014, 2018)

Grand Slam mixed doubles results
- Australian Open: 2R (2025)
- Last updated on: 17 November 2026.

Alex Bolt (born 5 January 1993) is an Australian professional tennis player. He plays mainly on the ATP Challenger Tour. His career-high rankings by the ATP are world No. 125 in singles and world No. 81 in doubles. Highlights of his career include quarterfinal appearances at the 2014 Australian Open men's doubles and at the 2017 Australian Open with Andrew Whittington and Bradley Mousley respectively.

== Career ==
=== 2010-2013: Career beginnings, top 400 ===
Bolt began his tennis career in Murray Bridge competing in the Murray Bridge Lawn Tennis Association. He made his ITF debut in October 2010 at the Australia F8, where he made the second round.

Throughout 2011, Bolt competed on the Futures circuit. His best performance was a semi final result in the Australian F7 in September. Bolt finished 2011 with a ranking of No. 897.

Bolt lost in the first round of qualifying for the 2012 Brisbane International to countryman, Luke Saville. Bolt spent the rest of 2012 competing on the Futures Circuit and reached his first final and winning the Australian F7 in Happy Valley, South Australia; this was his first career title. He competed in four finals from October–December; winning one. Bolt ended 2012 with a ranking of No. 483.

Bolt entered the qualifying rounds of Sydney International, where he made the second round, before losing to Guillermo Garcia-Lopez. He also made the second round of qualifying for the 2013 Australian Open, losing a tight contest 4–6, 7–5, 6–8 to Florent Serra.

Between February and May, Bolt competed in a number of Future tournaments, making the semi-finals in Australia F1, F2 and China F1. He lost in the first round of qualifying in the 2013 French Open to James Duckworth.

From June – September, Bolt played a number of Futures throughout Europe, mainly on clay, before returning to Australia the play in the futures there. his best result reaching the final of Cairns F7, losing to his doubles partner Andrew Whittington, 4–6, 4–6. Bolt ended 2013 with a ranking of No. 364.

=== 2014: Major wildcard & debut in doubles, First Challenger title ===
Bolt was given wildcards into both the 2014 Brisbane International and 2014 Australian Open qualifying, but lost in round 1 in both. Whittington and Bolt were given wildcards into the Men's doubles main draw. The pair defeated the No. 3 seeds David Marrero and Fernando Verdasco in round two, ultimately losing at the quarter-final stage to number 8 seed Daniel Nestor and Nenad Zimonjić. The match was played on Rod Laver Arena; the pairs first appearance on centre court.

In February, he made the quarter-final of the Burnie Challenger, losing to eventual runner-up Hiroki Moriya; before playing a number of Australian Futures, winning the F4 and coming runner-up in F5.

Bolt won his first ATP Challenger Tour title on 3 May at the China International against Nikola Mektić in straight sets, increasing his ranking to a career high of No.240. He also won the doubles, pairing with Andrew Whittington. At Wimbledon, Bolt fell just short of making his grand slam debut, losing in the final round of qualifying to Russian Konstantin Kravchuk in four sets. In September, Bolt made the semi-finals of the Napa Challenger.

=== 2015: Masters 1000 debut ===
Bolt at 2015 Wimbledon Championships

Bolt commenced 2015 at the Onkaparinga Challenger where he lost in the semifinals to Ryan Harrison. Bolt missed the 2015 Australian Open singles, but played in the doubles as a wildcard pair with Andrew Whittington reaching the third round. In February, Bolt made his second career ATP Challenger Tour final in Burnie. He lost in straight sets to Chung Hyeon.

In March, Bolt made his first ATP Masters 1000 main draw in Indian Wells, after two wins in qualification. He lost in straight sets to Robin Haase in the 1st round.

He lost in the first round of qualifying for the French Open to Bjorn Fratangelo, before turning to grass, where he completed in and qualified for three challenger events in a row, at Manchester, Surbiton and Ilkley. Bolt played in North America from July to August with limited success, before returning to Australia's Futures circuit where he made the final of the Cairns F7, but lost in three sets to Finn Tearney. In October and November, Bolt made quarter finals of both the Latrobe and Canberra Challengers.

Bolt finished 2015 with a singles ranking of No. 269.

=== 2016: Hiatus ===
Bolt commenced 2016 at the Onkaparinga Challenger when he made the quarter-final. He lost in the first round of qualifying for the 2016 Australian Open. In January and February, Bolt made the quarter-final of the Maui Challenger and Launceston Challenger, before returning to play three ITF tournaments across Australia, before taking a tennis hiatus that would last the remainder of the year.

Bolt ended 2016 with a ranking of No. 586.

=== 2017: Return to tennis and singles Grand Slam debut ===
Bolt returned from a 9-month hiatus in January 2017 to qualify for the Happy Valley Challenger. Bolt said; "This is my first tournament since March so it’s good to be back. I’m loving playing tennis again. It’s great fun and hopefully this run continues". Bolt defeated Tatsuma Ito before losing to Omar Jasika in round 2.

Bolt then qualified for the 2017 Australian Open, defeating Marius Copil, Matthias Bachinger and Julien Benneteau. This was Bolt's grand slam single debut. He lost to Yoshihito Nishioka in round 1. In Doubles, Bolt paired with Bradley Mousley where he reached the quarter-finals for the second time. Bolt reached the quarterfinals of both the Burnie International and Launceston International, but reached the finals in the Launceston doubles with Andrew Whittington. In February, Bolt travelled to Asia but failed to qualify for any Challenger events in singles, before returning to the futures tour in Australia. In May, Bolt travelled to Europe, where he qualified for and made the final of the Ilkley Trophy, losing to Marton Fucsovics in straight sets. This was Bolt's first appearance in a Challenger final for two years. With the result, his ranking jumped from 438 to 306 in the world. In October, Bolt made his second Challenger tour final of the season at Traralgon where he lost to fellow Aussie Jason Kubler in three tight sets.

In December, Bolt competed in the Australian Wildcard Playoff for a spot in the 2018 Australian Open. Despite losing to Alex De Minaur in the final, Bolt's performance throughout the tournament and strong 2017 earned him a discretionary wildcard into the Australian Open. He also received a wildcard into the main draw of the doubles with partner Bradley Mousley, who he made the quarter-finals with in 2017.

Bolt finished the year with a singles ranking of No. 192, an improvement of almost 400 places from the end of 2016. Bolt also had a handy year on the doubles circuit, making five Challenger finals with three victories to finish the season ranked No. 86, a career high doubles ranking.

=== 2018: First ATP singles win ===
Bolt started the season in his home state of South Australia at the inaugural Playford Challenger event, where he lost to Jason Kubler.

Bolt received a wildcard into the 2018 Sydney International in both singles and doubles, partnering compatriot Jordan Thompson. In the singles draw, Bolt lost in the first round to Ričardas Berankis.

At the Australian Open Bolt lost to Viktor Troicki as a wildcard in the first round in 5 sets. Bolt partnered Brad Mousley for doubles and lost in round 1 in 3 sets. In March, Bolt qualified for and won the Zhuhai Challenger.

In June, Bolt won his first ATP World Tour match at the Rosmalen Grass Court Championships, defeating Vasek Pospisil in round 1.

At the 2018 Wimbledon Championships Bolt qualified for the first time for the singles main draw of this Grand Slam. He lost to 21st seed Kyle Edmund in the first round. Bolt also partnered 2002 Men's singles Wimbledon champion Lleyton Hewitt in doubles after the pair received a wildcard. The pair lost also in the first round. In July, Bolt qualified for Hall of Fame Tennis Championships, Atlanta and Washington but lost in first round of all three. In August, Bolt lost in the final round of qualifying for the US Open.

=== 2019: Australian Open first win and third round, top 125 ===
Bolt received a wildcard in the Australian Open where he defeated Jack Sock in four sets for his first Grand Slam win. He defeated 29th seed Gilles Simon in the second round after saving four match points in the fourth set, but lost to Alexander Zverev in the third round.

=== 2020: First ATP Tour quarterfinal ===
In January 2020, Bolt reached the quarterfinal of the 2020 Adelaide International as a wildcard.

He was awarded a wildcard into the 2020 Australian Open and played Albert Ramos Viñolas in the first round, winning in five sets, before losing in the second round in five sets to eventual finalist, Dominic Thiem. Bolt finished the year with a ranking of World No. 171.

=== 2021: Second ATP Tour quarterfinal ===
He was awarded a fourth wildcard in a row for the Australian Open main draw where he lost to Grigor Dimitrov in the second round.

In June, Bolt won the 2021 Nottingham Trophy Challenger as a qualifier defeating Kamil Majchrzak. Following this successful run, Bolt received a wildcard to the Wimbledon main draw, where he defeated Filip Krajinović, before losing to Cameron Norrie in the second round.

In July, Bolt reached his second ATP Tour singles quarterfinal at Los Cabos. Bolt finished the year with a ranking of World No. 137.

=== 2022: Fifth consecutive singles Australian wildcard ===
Bolt was awarded, for a fifth consecutive year, a wildcard into the 2022 Australian Open singles main draw. He lost to Alejandro Davidovich Fokina in the first round. Bolt took a break from tennis, returning in October, winning the M25 Cairns on return.

Bolt finished the year with a ranking of World No. 636.

=== 2023: Australian Open doubles third round ===
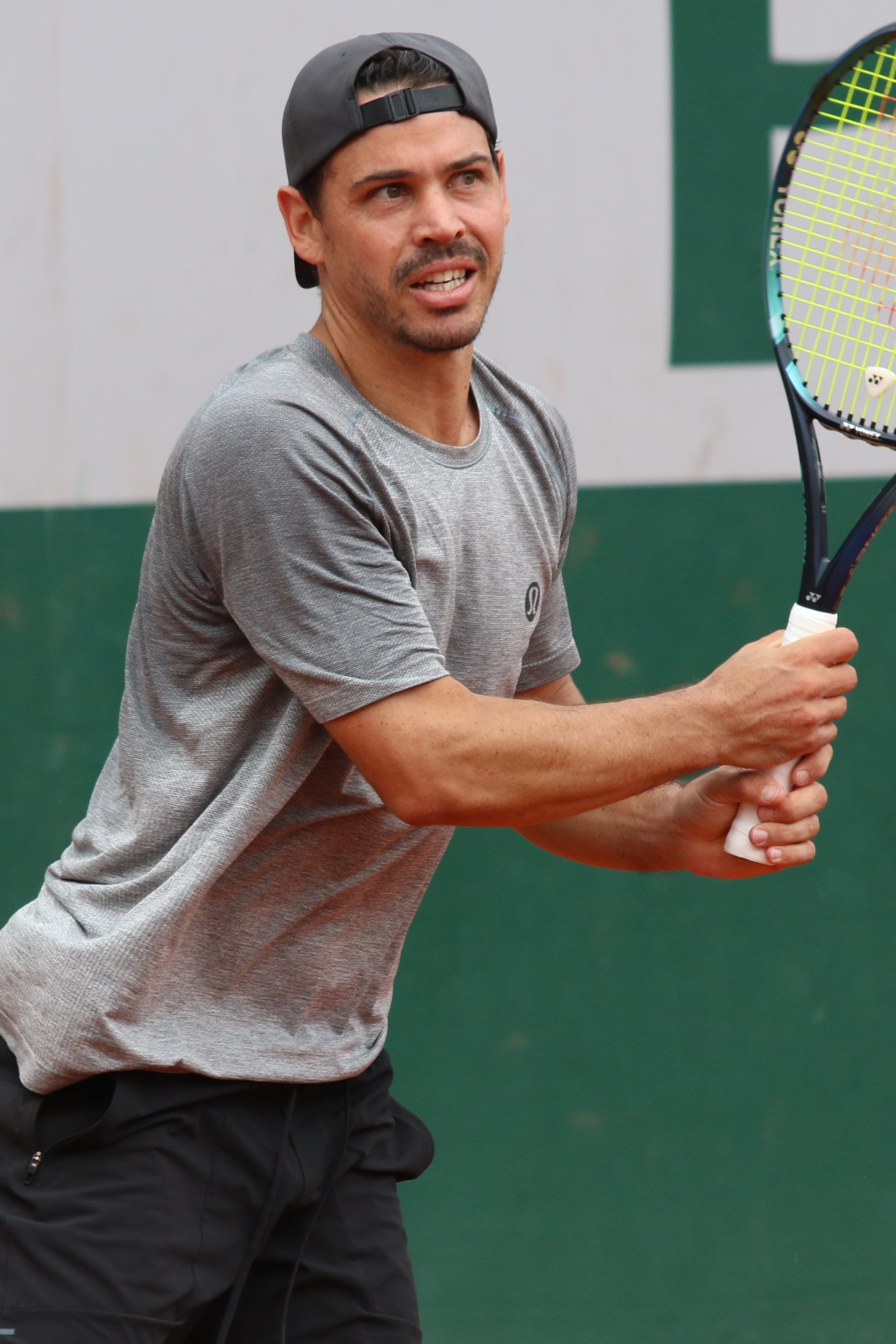
Bolt at the 2023 French Open

Bolt participated in the doubles event at the 2023 Australian Open partnering Luke Saville where they reached the third round.

=== 2024-2025: ATP quarterfinal, back to top 200 ===
At the 2024 Wimbledon Championships where he entered as an alternate in the qualifying competition, Bolt reached the main draw with a five-set win over Leandro Riedi, coming from a two sets to love down deficit, saving a match point in the process. He lost in the first round to eighth seed Casper Ruud in straight sets.

Bolt made it through qualifying at the 2024 Hall of Fame Open going on to defeat Jakub Menšík and fifth seed Brandon Nakashima before losing to second seed and eventual champion Marcos Giron in the quarterfinals.

In May, Bolt reached a Challenger final at the Wuxi Open, losing to Sun Fajing. The following month he qualified for the Queen's Club Championships, but lost to Jacob Fearnley in the first round.

== Personal life ==
Bolt was born in Murray Bridge, South Australia. He began playing tennis at the age of seven and also spent time playing Australian rules football and basketball throughout his youth. During his hiatus from tennis in 2016, Bolt began playing local football for the Mypolonga Tigers in River Murray Football League and worked as a fence-builder.

Bolt is an avid supporter of the Port Adelaide Football Club in the Australian Football League.

He is in a relationship with British professional tennis player Katie Swan.

== ATP Challenger and ITF Tour finals ==
=== Singles: 31 (12–19) ===
| Legend (singles) ATP Challenger Tour (4–11) ITF Futures Tour (8–8) | Titles by surface Hard (7–17) Clay (2–1) Grass (3–1) Carpet (0–0) |

| Result | W–L | Date | Tournament | Tier | Surface | Opponent | Score |
|---|---|---|---|---|---|---|---|
| Win | 1–0 | Sep 2012 | Australia F7, Happy Valley | Futures | Hard | (Australia) Adam Feeney | 5–7, 6–3, 6–1 |
| Loss | 1–1 | Oct 2012 | Australia F9, Esperance | Futures | Hard | (Australia) Adam Feeney | 6–3, 6–7^{(2–7)}, 2–6 |
| Loss | 1–2 | Dec 2012 | Hong Kong F1, Hong Kong | Futures | Hard | (Russia) Victor Baluda | 4–6, 2–6 |
| Win | 2–2 | Dec 2012 | Hong Kong F2, Hong Kong | Futures | Hard | (Russia) Victor Baluda | 6–3, 7–5 |
| Loss | 2–3 | Dec 2012 | Hong Kong F3, Hong Kong | Futures | Hard | (Netherlands) Miliaan Niesten | 2–6, 6–1, 4–6 |
| Loss | 2–4 | Sep 2013 | Australia F7, Cairns | Futures | Hard | (Australia) Andrew Whittington | 4–6, 4–6 |
| Win | 3–4 | Apr 2014 | Australia F4, Melbourne | Futures | Clay | (Australia) Blake Mott | 6–3, 6–2 |
| Loss | 3–5 | Apr 2014 | Australia F5, Glen Iris | Futures | Clay | (Australia) Luke Saville | 6–4, 6–7^{(4–7)}, 4–6 |
| Win | 4–5 | May 2014 | Anning, China, P.R. | Challenger | Clay | (Croatia) Nikola Mektić | 6–2, 7–5 |
| Loss | 4–6 | Feb 2015 | Burnie, Australia | Challenger | Hard | (South Korea) Chung Hyeon | 2–6, 5–7 |
| Loss | 4–7 | Oct 2015 | Australia F7, Cairns | Futures | Hard | (New Zealand) Finn Tearney | 7–6^{(7–5)}, 3–6, 3–6 |
| Loss | 4–8 | Jun 2017 | Ilkley, UK | Challenger | Grass | (Hungary) Márton Fucsovics | 1–6, 4–6 |
| Loss | 4–9 | Oct 2017 | Traralgon, Australia | Challenger | Hard | (Australia) Jason Kubler | 6–2, 6–7^{(6–8)}, 6–7^{(3–7)} |
| Win | 5–9 | Mar 2018 | Zhuhai, China, P.R. | Challenger | Hard | (Poland) Hubert Hurkacz | 5–7, 7–6^{(7–4)}, 6–2 |
| Loss | 5–10 | Oct 2018 | Fairfield, USA | Challenger | Hard | (United States) Bjorn Fratangelo | 4–6, 3–6 |
| Loss | 5–11 | Aug 2019 | Lexington, USA | Challenger | Hard | (Italy) Jannik Sinner | 4–6, 6–3, 4–6 |
| Loss | 5–12 | Feb 2020 | Launceston, Australia | Challenger | Hard | (Egypt) Mohamed Safwat | 6–7^{5–7}, 1-6 |
| Win | 6–12 | Jun 2021 | Nottingham, UK | Challenger | Grass | (Poland) Kamil Majchrzak | 4–6, 6–4, 6–3 |
| Win | 7–12 | Oct 2022 | M25 Cairns, Australia | World Tennis Tour | Hard | (Northern Mariana Islands) Colin Sinclair | 6–3, 6–2 |
| Loss | 7–13 | Feb 2023 | M25 Burnie, Australia | World Tennis Tour | Hard | (Japan) Yuta Shimizu | 4–6, 4–6 |
| Win | 8–13 | Feb 2023 | M25 Santo Domingo, Dominican Republic | World Tennis Tour | Hard | (Australia) Adam Walton | 4–6, 6–1, 7–6^{(7–5)} |
| Win | 9–13 | Mar 2023 | M25 Bakersfield, USA | World Tennis Tour | Hard | (United States) Kyle Kang | 6–3, 7–6^{(7–3)} |
| Loss | 9–14 | Feb 2024 | Burnie, Australia | Challenger | Hard | (Australia) Omar Jasika | 2–6, 7–6^{(7–2)}, 3–6 |
| Loss | 9–15 | Mar 2024 | M25 Traralgon, Australia | World Tennis Tour | Hard | (Australia) Li Tu | 4–6, 2–6 |
| Win | 10–15 | Mar 2024 | M25 Mildura, Australia | World Tennis Tour | Grass | (Australia) Luke Saville | 6–2, 6–2 |
| Win | 11–15 | Mar 2024 | M25 Swan Hill, Australia | World Tennis Tour | Grass | (Japan) Rio Noguchi | 6–1, 6–2 |
| Loss | 11–16 | Nov 2024 | Matsuyama, Japan | Challenger | Hard | (United States) Nicolas Moreno de Alboran | 6–7^{(4–7)}, 2–6 |
| Loss | 11–17 | May 2025 | Wuxi, China | Challenger | Hard | (China) Sun Fajing | 6–7^{(4–7)}, 4–6 |
| Loss | 11–18 | Sep 2025 | Jingshan, China | Challenger | Hard | (United States) Eliot Spizzirri | 4–6, 4–6 |
| Win | 12–18 | Nov 2025 | Brisbane, Australia | Challenger | Hard | (Chinese Taipei) Wu Tung-lin | 6–3, 6–3 |
| Loss | 12–19 | Feb 2026 | Brisbane, Australia | Challenger | Hard | (China) Zhang Zhizhen | 2–6, 4–6 |

=== Doubles: 33 (20–13) ===
| Legend (doubles) ATP Challenger Tour (9–9) ITF Futures Tour (11–4) | Titles by surface Hard (14–10) Clay (5–2) Grass (1–1) Carpet (0–0) |

| Result | W–L | Date | Tournament | Tier | Surface | Partner | Opponents | Score |
|---|---|---|---|---|---|---|---|---|
| Win | 1–0 | Apr 2012 | Italy F4, Vercelli | Futures | Clay | (Australia) Andrew Whittington | (Italy) Erik Crepaldi (Italy) Claudio Grassi | 6–3, 7–6^{(11–9)} |
| Win | 2–0 | Jun 2012 | Slovenia F2, Maribor | Futures | Clay | (Australia) Andrew Whittington | (Serbia) Miki Janković (Slovenia) Nik Razboršek | 6–4, 7–6^{(7–4)} |
| Win | 3–0 | Jun 2012 | Germany F6, Köln | Futures | Clay | (Australia) Andrew Whittington | (Germany) Jan-Lennard Struff (Germany) Mattis Wetzel | 6–1, 6–0 |
| Loss | 3–1 | Sep 2012 | Australia F8, Port Pirie | Futures | Hard | (Australia) Jack Schipanski | (Australia) Jay Andrijic (Australia) Adam Feeney | 2–6, 2–6 |
| Win | 4–1 | Oct 2012 | Australia F9, Esperance | Futures | Hard | (Australia) Benjamin Mitchell | (Australia) Adam Feeney (Australia) Zach Itzstein | 6–2, 6–3 |
| Win | 5–1 | Feb 2013 | Australia F1, Melbourne | Futures | Hard | (Australia) Nick Kyrgios | (Australia) Ryan Agar (Austria) Sebastian Bader | 7–6^{(8–6)}, 6–4 |
| Loss | 5–2 | Mar 2013 | Sydney, Australia | Challenger | Hard | (Australia) Nick Kyrgios | (Australia) Brydan Klein (Australia) Dane Propoggia | 4–6, 6–4, [9–11] |
| Loss | 5–3 | Jun 2013 | Italy F12, Padova | Futures | Clay | (Germany) Sami Reinwein | (Argentina) Andrés Molteni (Italy) Walter Trusendi | 7–6^{(12–10)}, 3–6, [5–10] |
| Loss | 5–4 | Jun 2013 | Milan, Italy | Challenger | Hard | (Chinese Taipei) Peng Hsien-yin | (Italy) Marco Crugnola (Italy) Daniele Giorgini | 6–4, 5–7, [8–10] |
| Win | 6–4 | Sep 2013 | Australia F6, Toowoomba | Futures | Hard | (Australia) Andrew Whittington | (Australia) Adam Feeney (Australia) Gavin van Peperzeel | 6–1, 3–6, [10–7] |
| Win | 7–4 | Sep 2013 | Australia F7, Cairns | Futures | Hard | (Australia) Andrew Whittington | (Australia) Isaac Frost (Japan) Kento Takeuchi | 6–3, 6–2 |
| Win | 8–4 | Sep 2013 | Australia F8, Alice Springs | Futures | Hard | (Australia) Andrew Whittington | (Australia) Adam Feeney (Australia) Gavin van Peperzeel | 6–3, 6–3 |
| Loss | 8–5 | Oct 2013 | Melbourne, Australia | Challenger | Hard | (Australia) Andrew Whittington | (Australia) Thanasi Kokkinakis (Australia) Benjamin Mitchell | 3–6, 2–6 |
| Win | 9–5 | May 2014 | Anning, China | Challenger | Clay | (Australia) Andrew Whittington | (United Kingdom) Daniel Cox (China) Gong Maoxin | 6–4, 6–3 |
| Loss | 9–6 | Jan 2015 | Happy Valley, Australia | Challenger | Hard | (Australia) Andrew Whittington | (Kazakhstan) Aleksandr Nedovyesov (Russia) Andrey Kuznetsov | 5–7, 4–6 |
| Loss | 9–7 | Oct 2015 | Australia F6, Alice Springs | Futures | Hard | (Australia) Jordan Thompson | (China) Gao Xin (China) Li Zhe | 6–3, 3–6, [1–10] |
| Win | 10–7 | Nov 2015 | Canberra, Australia | Challenger | Hard | (Australia) Andrew Whittington | (United Kingdom) Brydan Klein (Australia) Dane Propoggia | 7–6^{(7–2)}, 6–3 |
| Loss | 10–8 | Jan 2016 | Maui, USA | Challenger | Hard | (Germany) Frank Moser | (Chinese Taipei) Jason Jung (United States) Dennis Novikov | 3–6, 6–4, [8–10] |
| Win | 11–8 | Feb 2016 | Australia F1, Port Pirie | Futures | Hard | (Australia) Andrew Whittington | (Australia) Marc Polmans (New Zealand) Jose Statham | 7–6^{(7–1)}, 6–3 |
| Loss | 11–9 | Mar 2016 | Australia F2, Mildura | Futures | Grass | (Australia) Andrew Whittington | (Australia) Steven de Waard (Australia) Marc Polmans | 3–6, 7–6^{(11–9)}, [6–10] |
| Loss | 11–10 | Feb 2017 | Launceston, Australia | Challenger | Hard | (Australia) Andrew Whittington | (Australia) Bradley Mousley (Australia) Luke Saville | 2–6, 1–6 |
| Win | 12–10 | Mar 2017 | Australia F1, Mildura | Futures | Grass | (Australia) Dane Propoggia | (Australia) Harry Bourchier (Australia) Gavin van Peperzeel | 6–3, 6–7^{(2–7)}, [11–9] |
| Win | 13–10 | May 2017 | Italy F14, Frascati | Futures | Clay | (Australia) Jason Kubler | (Italy) Federico Maccari (Italy) Andrea Vavassori | 6–1, 7–6^{(8–6)} |
| Win | 14–10 | Aug 2017 | Lexington, USA | Challenger | Hard | (Australia) Max Purcell | (France) Tom Jomby (United States) Eric Quigley | 7–5, 6–4 |
| Loss | 14–11 | Aug 2017 | Aptos, USA | Challenger | Hard | (Australia) Jordan Thompson | (Israel) Jonathan Erlich (United Kingdom) Neal Skupski | 3–6, 6–2, [8–10] |
| Win | 15–11 | Oct 2017 | Traralgon, Australia | Challenger | Hard | (Australia) Bradley Mousley | (United States) Evan King (United States) Nathan Pasha | 6–4, 6–2 |
| Win | 16–11 | Nov 2017 | Canberra, Australia | Challenger | Hard | (Australia) Bradley Mousley | (Australia) Luke Saville (Australia) Andrew Whittington | 6–3, 6–2 |
| Win | 17–11 | Feb 2018 | Launceston, Australia | Challenger | Hard | (Australia) Bradley Mousley | (United States) Sekou Bangoura (United States) Nathan Pasha | 7–6^{(8–6)}, 6–0 |
| Loss | 17–12 | Apr 2019 | Nanchang, China | Challenger | Clay (i) | (Australia) Akira Santillan | (Netherlands) Sander Arends (Austria) Tristan-Samuel Weissborn | 2–6, 4–6 |
| Loss | 17–13 | Oct 2019 | Ningbo, China | Challenger | Hard | (Australia) Matt Reid | (Australia) Andrew Harris (Australia) Marc Polmans | 0–6, 1–6 |
| Win | 18–13 | Jun 2023 | Tyler, United States | Challenger | Hard | (Australia) Andrew Harris | (United States) Evan King (United States) Reese Stalder | 6–1, 6–4 |
| Win | 19-13 | Sep 2023 | Shanghai, China | Challenger | Hard | (Australia) Luke Saville | (China) Rigele Te (China) Yunchaokete Bu | 4–6, 6–3, [11–9] |
| Win | 20–13 | Feb 2024 | Burnie, Australia | Challenger | Hard | (Australia) Luke Saville | (Australia) Tristan Schoolkate (Australia) Adam Walton | 5–7, 6–3, [12–10] |

== Performance timelines ==
Key
| W | F | SF | QF | #R | RR | Q# | DNQ | A | NH |

(W) winner; (F) finalist; (SF) semifinalist; (QF) quarterfinalist; (#R) rounds 4, 3, 2, 1; (RR) round-robin stage; (Q#) qualification round; (DNQ) did not qualify; (A) absent; (NH) not held; (SR) strike rate (events won / competed); (W–L) win–loss record.
To avoid confusion and double counting, these charts are updated at the conclusion of a tournament or when the player's participation has ended.

=== Singles ===
| Tournament | 2013 | 2014 | 2015 | 2016 | 2017 | 2018 | 2019 | 2020 | 2021 | 2022 | 2023 | 2024 | 2025 | 2026 | SR | W–L | Win% |
|---|---|---|---|---|---|---|---|---|---|---|---|---|---|---|---|---|---|
Grand Slam tournaments
| Australian Open | Q2 | Q1 | A | Q1 | 1R | 1R | 3R | 2R | 2R | 1R | Q2 | A | Q1 | Q1 | 0 / 6 | 4–6 | 40% |
| French Open | Q1 | A | Q1 | A | A | Q1 | Q1 | Q1 | Q1 | A | Q1 | A | Q1 | | 0 / 0 | 0–0 | – |
| Wimbledon | A | Q3 | A | A | A | 1R | Q2 | NH | 2R | A | Q1 | 1R | 1R | | 0 / 4 | 1–4 | 20% |
| US Open | A | Q1 | A | A | A | Q3 | Q1 | A | A | A | A | Q2 | Q1 | | 0 / 0 | 0–0 | – |
| Win–loss | 0–0 | 0–0 | 0–0 | 0–0 | 0–1 | 0–2 | 2–1 | 1–1 | 2–2 | 0–1 | 0–0 | 0–1 | 0–1 | 0–0 | 0 / 10 | 5–10 | 33% |
ATP Tour Masters 1000
| Indian Wells Masters | A | A | 1R | A | A | A | 2R | NH | Q1 | Q1 | A | A | A | | 0 / 2 | 1–2 | 33% |
| Miami Open | A | A | Q1 | A | A | A | Q1 | NH | A | Q1 | A | A | A | | 0 / 0 | 0–0 | – |
| Monte-Carlo Masters | A | A | A | A | A | A | A | NH | A | A | A | A | A | | 0 / 0 | 0–0 | – |
| Madrid Open | A | A | A | A | A | A | A | NH | A | A | A | A | A | | 0 / 0 | 0–0 | – |
| Italian Open | A | A | A | A | A | A | A | A | A | A | A | A | A | | 0 / 0 | 0–0 | – |
| Canadian Open | A | A | A | A | A | A | A | NH | A | A | A | A | A | | 0 / 0 | 0–0 | – |
| Cincinnati Masters | A | A | A | A | A | A | A | A | A | A | A | A | A | | 0 / 0 | 0–0 | – |
| Shanghai Masters | A | A | A | A | A | A | A | NH | | | Q1 | Q2 | A | | 0 / 0 | 0–0 | – |
| Paris Masters | A | A | A | A | A | A | A | A | A | A | A | A | A | | 0 / 0 | 0–0 | – |
| Win–loss | 0–0 | 0–0 | 0–1 | 0–0 | 0–0 | 0–0 | 1–1 | 0–0 | 0–0 | 0–0 | 0–0 | 0–0 | 0–0 | 0–0 | 0 / 2 | 1–2 | 33% |
Career statistics
| | 2013 | 2014 | 2015 | 2016 | 2017 | 2018 | 2019 | 2020 | 2021 | 2022 | 2023 | 2024 | 2025 | 2026 | Career | | |
| Tournaments | 0 | 0 | 1 | 0 | 2 | 7 | 4 | 3 | 6 | 3 | 2 | 3 | 2 | | 33 | | |
| Overall win–loss | 0–0 | 0–0 | 0–1 | 0–0 | 0–2 | 1–7 | 3–4 | 3–3 | 6–6 | 0–3 | 1–2 | 3–3 | 0–2 | | 17–33 | | |
| Year-end ranking | 474 | 203 | 269 | 586 | 189 | 154 | 159 | 171 | 137 | 636 | 329 | 157 | | | 34% | | |

=== Doubles ===
| Tournament | 2013 | 2014 | 2015 | 2016 | 2017 | 2018 | 2019 | 2020 | 2021 | 2022 | 2023 | 2024 | SR | W–L |
|---|---|---|---|---|---|---|---|---|---|---|---|---|---|---|
Grand Slam tournaments
| Australian Open | 2R | QF | 3R | 1R | QF | 1R | 1R | 1R | A | 1R | 3R | 1R | 0 / 11 | 11–11 |
| French Open | A | A | A | A | A | A | A | A | A | A | A | A | 0 / 0 | 0–0 |
| Wimbledon | A | 1R | A | A | A | 1R | A | NH | A | A | A | A | 0 / 2 | 0–2 |
| US Open | A | A | A | A | A | A | A | A | A | A | A | A | 0 / 0 | 0–0 |
| Win–loss | 1–1 | 3–2 | 2–1 | 0–1 | 3–1 | 0–2 | 0–1 | 0–1 | 0–0 | 0–1 | 2–1 | 0–1 | 0 / 13 | 11–13 |
National representation
| Davis Cup | A | A | A | A | A | A | A | RR | | A | A | A | 0 / 1 | 1–0 |
Career statistics
| Tournaments | 1 | 2 | 1 | 1 | 2 | 4 | 2 | 2 | 1 | 2 | 1 | 2 | 20 | |
| Overall win–loss | 1–1 | 3–2 | 2–1 | 0–1 | 5–2 | 1–4 | 1–2 | 0–2 | 1–0 | 0–2 | 2–1 | 0–2 | 16–20 | |
| Year-end ranking | 157 | 107 | 159 | 510 | 86 | 242 | 254 | 344 | 737 | 1272 | 175 | | 47% | |

== National representation ==
All Davis Cup matches: 1–0 (Singles: 0–0, Doubles: 1–0)
| Round | Date | Opponents | Tie score | Venue | Surface | Match | Opponent(s) | Rubber score |
2019 Davis Cup Finals
| RR | 27 Nov 2021 | Hungary | 2–1 | Turin | Hard (i) | Doubles (with John Peers) | Fábián Marozsán / Zsombor Piros | 6–3, 6–7^{(11–13), 6–3} |
