= Cruz Hewitt =

Australian tennis player (born 2008)

- Full name: Cruz Lleyton Hewitt
- Country (sports): Australia
- Born: 11 December 2008 (age 17) St Leonards, New South Wales, Australia
- Height: 1.85 m (6 ft 1 in)
- Plays: Right-handed (two-handed backhand)
- Coach: Peter Luczak
- Prize money: US $154,554

Singles
- Career record: 2–2 (at ATP Tour level, Grand Slam level, and in Davis Cup)
- Career titles: 0
- Highest ranking: No. 314 (26 October 2026)
- Current ranking: No. 314 (26 October 2026)

Grand Slam singles results
- Australian Open: Q1 (2025, 2026)
- Australian Open Junior: 2R (2025)
- French Open Junior: 1R (2025)
- Wimbledon Junior: F (2026)
- US Open Junior: 1R (2025)

Doubles
- Career record: 0–2 (at ATP Tour level, Grand Slam level, and in Davis Cup)
- Career titles: 0
- Highest ranking: No. 690 (29 June 2026)
- Current ranking: No. 1,064 (26 October 2026)

Grand Slam doubles results
- Australian Open: 1R (2026)
- Australian Open Junior: 1R (2025)
- Wimbledon Junior: 2R (2025)
- US Open Junior: 2R (2025)

Grand Slam mixed doubles results
- Australian Open: 1R (2026)
- Last updated on: 26 October 2026.

Cruz Lleyton Hewitt (born 11 December 2008) is an Australian tennis player. He has a career-high ATP singles ranking of No. 314 achieved on 26 October 2026 and a doubles ranking of No. 690, reached on 29 June 2026.

== Early life and background ==
Hewitt was born in Sydney, Australia on 11 December 2008 at the Royal North Shore Hospital. His father, Lleyton Hewitt, is a former professional tennis player who reached the world No. 1 ranking and won two Grand Slams–the 2001 US Open and 2002 Wimbledon–throughout his career. His mother, Bec, is a former actress and singer best known for her role on the soap opera Home and Away. Hewitt's aunt, Jaslyn, is also a former professional tennis player who competed on the women's circuit and his grandfather, Glynn, was a professional Australian rules footballer who played at the highest level for the AFL club Richmond in the 1970s. His great-uncle Darryl Hewitt is also a retired footballer who played at the highest level for St Kilda, and Cruz's great-grandfather Max Hewitt played football for West Adelaide in the 1950s and 1960s, a football career which was rewarded with a SANFL Life Membership upon retirement.

Hewitt spent the first seven years of his life predominantly living in the Bahamas where he developed a passion for soccer, before relocating to Melbourne in 2016 after his father retired from professional tennis and began working at Tennis Australia's headquarters. In 2021, the Hewitt family moved to the Gold Coast in an attempt to further Cruz's tennis prospects by training at the KDV Tennis Academy with high-level coaches and opposition at state-of-the-art facilities.

== Junior career ==
Hewitt entered his first ITF junior tournament a month after his 13th birthday in January 2022, receiving a wildcard entry into the J1 Traralgon qualifying draw. He was defeated in straight sets by eventual quarterfinalist Daniel Verbeek 2–6, 0–6. He claimed his first junior ITF victory at a J5 Darwin tournament in May 2022 when he was victorious in a main draw first-round match against Jett Grech 6–2, 6–2 before being defeated in the second round. In November 2022, still aged 13, the Australian claimed his first junior ITF title in a Fijian J5 Lautoka tournament with victory in the final against compatriot Cristian Care. In doing so, he became the youngest male to win an ITF junior tournament that year.

Hewitt began 2023 by entering the qualifying draw for the Australian Open, where he was defeated in three sets by number-one seed Adhithya Ganesan in the first round. He won his second junior ITF title in the Virgin Islands at a J30 Christiansted tournament in May 2023 with a 6–3, 6–3 victory in the final against American Ryan Cozad. Hewitt claimed his third ITF junior title a month later with a win in a J60 Darwin tournament. Hewitt ended the 2023 season with a fourth junior ITF title in Thailand at a J60 Nonthaburi tournament with a 7–5, 6–1 final win against Russian Makar Krivoshchekov.

In January 2024, Hewitt made his junior Grand Slam debut at 15 years of age when he received a wildcard entry into the Australian Open boys' singles main draw event. He was defeated in the first round by sixth-seeded American Alexander Razeghi 2–6, 3–6 in front of a large show court crowd. In October 2024, still aged 15, Hewitt entered the top 100 in the under-18 junior rankings after claiming a seventh title at a New Zealand J100 tournament in Christchurch.

Hewitt had good results on the ITF junior circuit, holding a singles win-loss record of 93–39 and reached an ITF junior combined ranking of No. 38 on 5 January 2026. In June 2026, Hewitt returned to the junior circuit to contest the 2026 Wimbledon Championships and progressed through to the final of the tournament without dropping a set. He lost the final to Jordan Lee in three sets.

== Professional career ==
=== 2023-2024: Pro beginnings ===
Hewitt entered his first professional tournament at 14 years of age in September 2023 when he gained direct entry into the qualifying draw of an ITF M25 tournament in Darwin. He claimed third-set tiebreaker victories in his first two qualifying matches but was defeated in straight sets in the final round of qualifying.

Hewitt continued to enter and unsuccessfully qualify for professional ITF tournaments over the next 12 months before receiving a wildcard entry into the main draw of an Indonesian ITF M15 event in Bali in August 2024. Here, he claimed his first professional main draw win—against Thijmen Loof 6–4, 6–4—at the age of 15.

=== 2025: Grand Slam qualifying debut ===
Hewitt began his season at the 2025 Canberra International after receiving a wildcard entry into the qualifying draw. He lost in straight sets to Brandon Holt in the first qualifying round. As is customary each year, Tennis Australia often awards several senior Australian Open qualifying wildcards to its top ranked juniors and as second highest ranked Australian junior male at the beginning of the 2025 season, Hewitt was awarded a qualifying wildcard into the 2025 Australian Open where he made his senior Grand Slam debut. He lost in the first qualifying round in straight sets to former top 20 player Nikoloz Basilashvili.

In November, he played doubles with his father Lleyton at the 2025 NSW Sydney Open, Australia, where they got a wildcard and reached the quarterfinals. In the quarterfinals they were defeated in straight sets by fellow Australians Calum Puttergill and Dane Sweeny. The pair also entered the Playford Tennis International, but ultimately conceded a walkover; though Cruz played in the singles draw.

=== 2026: ATP debut and first tour-level win ===
Hewitt spent the first half of the 2026 season focusing on competing in professional Challenger and Futures tournaments with the highlight occurring in March 2026 when he reached his first professional final in an Australian Futures tournament in Wodonga where he was defeated in the final by Colin Sinclair in straight sets. Following his run to the junior Wimbledon final in June 2026, tournament organisers at the 2026 Washington DC Open announced via social media that "the future is here" by awarding both junior Wimbledon finalists Hewitt and Jordan Lee wildcard entries into the qualifying tournament in July 2026.

Entering the Washington tournament ranked No. 612, Hewitt impressively led former top 25 player Dušan Lajović 5-2 before the Serbian retired in the first round of qualifying and Hewitt impressed once again in the second round of qualifying when he led 6-1 6-7 2-0 against the American number 1 seed Zachary Svajda before also succumbing to a retirement, which saw Hewitt qualifying for his first ever ATP main draw event. Hewitt recorded his first ATP Tour win over American top 80 player Marcos Giron and became the fourth man born in 2008 or later to win a tour-level match (excluding Davis Cup). Hewitt then faced compatriot and world no. 6 Alex de Minaur in the second round of the Washington event, which he lost.

== Personal life ==
Hewitt identifies the Australian Open as his favorite Grand Slam, citing the packed stadiums and passionate crowds, making him feel "at home". His dream doubles partner is compatriot Alex de Minaur, and says he admires Ben Shelton's serve.

Beyond tennis, Hewitt is a supporter of the Adelaide Crows in the Australian Football League, like his father.

== Performance timeline ==
Key
W	F	SF	QF	#R	RR	Q#	DNQ	A	NH

(W) winner; (F) finalist; (SF) semifinalist; (QF) quarterfinalist; (#R) rounds 4, 3, 2, 1; (RR) round-robin stage; (Q#) qualification round; (DNQ) did not qualify; (A) absent; (NH) not held; (SR) strike rate (events won / competed); (W–L) win–loss record.
To avoid confusion and double counting, these charts are updated at the conclusion of a tournament or when the player's participation has ended.

=== Singles ===
Current through the 2026 Australian Open.

Tournament	2025	2026	SR	W–L	Win %
Grand Slam tournaments
Australian Open	Q1	Q1	0 / 0	0–0	–
French Open	A	A	0 / 0	0–0	–
Wimbledon	A	A	0 / 0	0–0	–
US Open	A		0 / 0	0–0	–
Win–loss	0–0	0–0	0 / 0	0–0	–
ATP Masters 1000
Indian Wells Masters	A	A	0 / 0	0–0	–
Miami Open	A	A	0 / 0	0–0	–
Monte Carlo Masters	A	A	0 / 0	0–0	–
Madrid Open	A	A	0 / 0	0-0	–
Italian Open	A	A	0 / 0	0–0	–
Canadian Open	A		0 / 0	0–0	–
Cincinnati Masters	A		0 / 0	0–0	–
Shanghai Masters	A		0 / 0	0–0	–
Paris Masters	A		0 / 0	0–0	–
Win–loss	0–0	0–0	0 / 0	0–0	–

== ITF World Tennis Tour finals ==
=== Singles: 2 (2 runner-ups) ===
Finals by surface
Hard (0–1)
Grass (0–1)

Result	W–L	Date	Tournament	Surface	Opponent	Score
Loss	0–1	Feb 2025	M25 Launceston, Australia	Hard	(Australia) Jason Kubler	2–6, 4–6
Loss	0–2	Mar 2026	M15 Wodonga, Australia	Grass	(Northern Mariana Islands) Colin Sinclair	3–6, 2–6

=== Doubles: 3 (1 title, 2 runner-ups) ===
Finals by surface
Hard (1–2)

Result	W–L	Date	Tournament	Surface	Partner	Opponents	Score
Loss	0–1	Aug 2025	M15 Brisbane, Australia	Hard	(Turkey) Mustafa Ege Şık	(Australia) Ethan Cook (Australia) Tai Sach	7–5, 2–6, [9–11]
Win	1–1	Sep 2025	M25 Tamworth, Australia	Hard	(Australia) Jesse Delaney	(Australia) Ethan Cook (Australia) Tai Sach	3–6, 6–3, [10–4]
Loss	1–2	Apr 2026	M15 Singapore, Singapore	Hard (i)	(Australia) Chen Dong	(United Kingdom) Emile Hudd (Australia) Matt Hulme	3–6, 2–6

== Junior Grand Slam finals ==
=== Singles: 1 (runner-up) ===
Result	Year	Tournament	Surface	Opponent	Score
Loss	2026	Wimbledon	Grass	(United States) Jordan Lee	6–4, 4–6, 5–7
