= Blake Bayldon =

Australian tennis player (born 1998)

- Country (sports): Australia
- Born: 7 December 1998 (age 27) Sydney, Australia
- Height: 1.83 m (6 ft 0 in)
- Plays: Left-handed (two-handed backhand)
- College: Boise State
- Prize money: $103,941

Singles
- Career record: 0–0 (at ATP Tour level, Grand Slam level, and in Davis Cup)
- Career titles: 0
- Highest ranking: No. 1,248 (17 March 2025)

Doubles
- Career record: 2–5 (at ATP Tour level, Grand Slam level, and in Davis Cup)
- Career titles: 1 Challenger, 3 ITF
- Highest ranking: No. 95 (25 August 2025)
- Current ranking: No. 105 (23 February 2026)

Grand Slam doubles results
- US Open: 1R (2025)

Grand Slam mixed doubles results
- Australian Open: 1R (2026)
- Last updated on: 27 February 2026.

Blake Bayldon (born 7 December 1998) is an Australian tennis player. He has a career high ATP doubles ranking of world No. 95 achieved on 25 August 2025.

== College ==
He played college tennis at Barry before transferring to Boise State.

== Professional career ==
=== 2024: Doubles ATP Tour debut ===
Bayldon made his ATP main draw debut at the 2024 Hangzhou Open in the doubles main draw with compatriot Thomas Fancutt.

=== 2025: Maiden Challenger doubles title, first ATP Tour doubles final ===
He won his maiden ATP Challenger Tour doubles title at the 2025 Open Nouvelle-Calédonie with Colin Sinclair from the Mariana Islands.

Partnering Matthew Romios at the Challenger 125 2025 Bengaluru Open, he lost to Anirudh Chandrasekar and Ray Ho in the final.

Playing his second ATP tour main draw in doubles at the 2025 Los Cabos Open partnering compatriot Tristan Schoolkate, Bayldon recorded his first wins on this level and reached his first final.

== ATP career finals ==
=== Doubles: 1 (0 title, 1 runners-up) ===
Legend Grand Slams (0–0) ATP Finals (0–0) ATP Masters 1000 (0–0) ATP 500 (0–0) ATP 250 (0–0)	Titles by surface Hard (0–1) Clay (0–0) Grass (0–0)

Result	W–L	Date	Tournament	Tier	Surface	Partner	Opponents	Score
Loss	0–1	Jul 2025	Los Cabos Open, Mexico	ATP 250	Hard	(Australia) Tristan Schoolkate	(United States) Robert Cash (United States) JJ Tracy	6–7^{(4–7)}, 4–6
