= Kody Pearson =

Australian tennis player (born 1999)

- Country (sports): Australia
- Born: 26 July 1999 (age 26) Rockdale, Australia
- Height: 1.78 m (5 ft 10 in)
- Plays: Right-handed (one-handed backhand)
- College: Tulsa (2018–2023)
- Prize money: $63,687

Singles
- Career record: 0–0 (at ATP Tour level, Grand Slam level, and in Davis Cup)
- Career titles: 0
- Highest ranking: No. 790 (11 December 2023)
- Current ranking: No. 1,375 (17 November 2025)

Doubles
- Career record: 0–0 (at ATP Tour level, Grand Slam level, and in Davis Cup)
- Career titles: 1 Challenger, 6 ITF
- Highest ranking: No. 187 (17 November 2025)
- Current ranking: No. 187 (17 November 2025)
- Last updated on: 17 November 2025.

Kody Pearson (born 26 July 1999) is an Australian tennis player.

Pearson has a career high ATP singles ranking of No. 790 achieved on 11 December 2023 and a career high ATP doubles ranking of No. 187 achieved on 17 November 2025.

Pearson has won one ATP Challenger doubles title at the 2025 Queensland International III.

Pearson played college tennis at Tulsa.
