= Matt Hulme =

Australian tennis player

- Country (sports): Australia
- Born: 17 February 1999 (age 27) Brisbane, Australia
- Height: 1.91 m (6 ft 3 in)
- Plays: Right-handed (two-handed backhand)
- College: Omaha
- Prize money: US $53,976

Singles
- Career record: 0–0 (at ATP Tour level, Grand Slam level, and in Davis Cup)
- Career titles: 0
- Highest ranking: No. 749 (14 September 2026)
- Current ranking: No. 749 (14 September 2026)

Doubles
- Career record: 0–0 (at ATP Tour level, Grand Slam level, and in Davis Cup)
- Career titles: 2 Challenger, 4 ITF
- Highest ranking: No. 230 (2 February 2026)
- Current ranking: No. 311 (14 September 2026)
- Last updated on: 14 September 2026.

Matt Hulme (born 17 February 1999) is an Australian tennis player. He has a career high ATP singles ranking of world No. 749 achieved on 14 September 2026 and a career high doubles ranking of No. 230 achieved on 2 February 2026.

Hulme won his first ATP Challenger doubles title at the 2025 Côte d'Ivoire Open, where he played alongside Dutchman Thijmen Loof.

== Career ==
Playing alongside James Watt, he won the doubles title at the International Tennis Federation $25,000 men's world tour tournament in Cairns, Australia in October 2024. In February 2025, he and Watt reached the final of the 2025 Queensland International II in Brisbane where they lost to Joshua Charlton and Patrick Harper, in a tight match 4-6, 7-6(5),12-10.

In April 2025, playing alongside Thijmen Loof, he reached the final of the men’s doubles at the 2025 Côte d'Ivoire Open in Abidjan on the Challenger tour, where they defeated Clement Chidekh and Jody Maginley in straight sets. In November 2025, he won the men’s doubles at the 2025 Queensland International III, playing alongside Kody Pearson.

== College ==
Hulme played college tennis at Omaha.
