= 2025 Mexico City Open =

- Date: 7 – 13 April
- Edition: 4th
- Surface: Clay
- Location: Mexico City, Mexico

Champions

Singles
- (Brazil) Felipe Meligeni Alves

Doubles
- (Mexico) Santiago González / (United States) Austin Krajicek
← 2024 ·	Mexico City Open	· 2026 →

The 2025 Mexico City Open was a professional tennis tournament played on clay courts. It was the fourth edition of the tournament which was part of the 2025 ATP Challenger Tour. It took place in Mexico City, Mexico between 7 and 13 April 2025.

== Singles main-draw entrants ==
=== Seeds ===
Country	Player	Rank^{1}	Seed
AUS	James Duckworth	89	1
ARG	Thiago Agustín Tirante	111	2
FRA	Adrian Mannarino	144	3
BRA	Felipe Meligeni Alves	152	4
ARG	Juan Pablo Ficovich	155	5
CAN	Alexis Galarneau	162	6
SUI	Marc-Andrea Hüsler	168	7
~~FRA~~	~~Hugo Grenier~~	~~182~~	~~8~~

- ^{1} Rankings are as of 31 March 2025.

=== Other entrants ===
The following players received wildcards into the singles main draw:

- (Mexico) Rodrigo Alujas
- (United States) Darwin Blanch
- (Mexico) Alex Hernández

The following players received entry into the singles main draw as alternates:

- (United States) Maxime Cressy
- (France) Luka Pavlovic

The following players received entry from the qualifying draw:

- (Canada) Juan Carlos Aguilar
- (United States) Andres Martin
- (Austria) Maximilian Neuchrist
- (Austria) Neil Oberleitner
- (United States) Alfredo Perez
- (Brazil) Pedro Sakamoto

The following player received entry as a lucky loser:

- (France) Tom Paris

== Champions ==
=== Singles ===
- (Brazil) Felipe Meligeni Alves def. (France) Luka Pavlovic 6–3, 6–3.

=== Doubles ===
- (Mexico) Santiago González / (United States) Austin Krajicek def. (United States) Ryan Seggerman / (United States) Patrik Trhac 7–6^{(11–9)}, 3–6, [10–5].
