= 2023 Mexico City Open – Singles =

Singles
- 2023 Mexico City Open

Final
- Champion: (Germany) Dominik Koepfer
- Runner-up: (Argentina) Thiago Agustín Tirante
- Score: 2–6, 6–4, 6–2

Events
Singles	Doubles
← 2022 ·	Mexico City Open	· 2024 →

Marc-Andrea Hüsler was the defending champion but lost in the second round to Federico Gaio.

Dominik Koepfer won the title after defeating Thiago Agustín Tirante 2–6, 6–4, 6–2 in the final.

== Seeds ==
1. (Switzerland) Marc-Andrea Hüsler (second round)
2. (Colombia) Daniel Elahi Galán (second round)
3. (Argentina) Facundo Bagnis (first round)
4. (Australia) James Duckworth (second round)
5. (Germany) Yannick Hanfmann (first round)
6. (Chile) Alejandro Tabilo (second round)
7. (Brazil) Felipe Meligeni Alves (second round)
8. (Italy) Luciano Darderi (first round)

== Draw ==
=== Key ===
- Q = Qualifier
- WC = Wild card
- LL = Lucky loser
- Alt = Alternate
- SE = Special exempt
- PR = Protected ranking
- ITF = ITF entry
- JE = Junior exempt
- w/o = Walkover
- r = Retired
- d = Defaulted
- SR = Special ranking

=== Finals ===
Semifinals
Q	(Germany) Dominik Koepfer	6	6
Q	(Austria) Maximilian Neuchrist	2	4
Alt	(Argentina) Thiago Agustín Tirante	7^{7}	4	6
(United Kingdom) Jan Choinski	6^{5}	6	4

Final
Q	(Germany) Dominik Koepfer	2	6	6
Alt	(Argentina) Thiago Agustín Tirante	6	4	2

=== Top half ===
First round
1	(Switzerland) M-A Hüsler	6	7
(Argentina) F Mena	4	5
Q	(Italy) F Gaio	7^{7}	3	7^{7}
Q	(Argentina) JI Londero	6^{5}	6	6^{5}
(Japan) R Noguchi	3	2
Q	(Germany) D Koepfer	6	6
(Chile) T Barrios Vera	6	7
5	(Germany) Y Hanfmann	3	5
3	(Argentina) F Bagnis	3	4
(United States) N Moreno de Alboran	6	6
Q	(Germany) Elmar Ejupovic	7^{10}	6^{5}	2
(Switzerland) A Bellier	6^{8}	7^{7}	6
(United States) M Krueger	4	6	1
Q	(Austria) M Neuchrist	6	1	6
(Argentina) JP Ficovich	3	3
7	(Brazil) F Meligeni Alves	6	6

Second round
1	(Switzerland) M-A Hüsler	6	0	3
Q	(Italy) F Gaio	3	6	6
Q	(Germany) D Koepfer	4	6	7
(Chile) T Barrios Vera	6	4	5
(United States) N Moreno de Alboran	4	7	4
(Switzerland) A Bellier	6	5	6
Q	(Austria) M Neuchrist	7^{7}	7^{7}
7	(Brazil) F Meligeni Alves	6^{2}	6^{5}

Quarterfinals
Q	(Italy) F Gaio	4	6	6^{5}
Q	(Germany) D Koepfer	6	4	7^{7}
(Switzerland) A Bellier	6^{4}	6^{5}
Q	(Austria) M Neuchrist	7^{7}	7^{7}

Semifinals
Q	(Germany) D Koepfer	6	6
Q	(Austria) M Neuchrist	2	4

=== Bottom half ===
First round
8	(Italy) L Darderi	4	4
(Argentina) R Olivo	6	6
WC	(Australia) B Tomic	2	2
Alt	(Argentina) TA Tirante	6	6
(Argentina) GA Olivieri	2	0
WC	(Colombia) N Mejía	6	6
WC	(Mexico) R Pacheco Méndez	2	5
4	(Australia) J Duckworth	6	7
6	(Chile) A Tabilo	7	6
(South Korea) S-c Hong	5	3
(France) E Couacaud	6^{4}	7	6
(Dominican Republic) N Hardt	7^{7}	5	3
(United Kingdom) J Choinski	6	6
(Canada) A Galarneau	2	2
Q	(France) T Atmane	3	4
2	(Colombia) DE Galán	6	6

Second round
(Argentina) R Olivo	7^{11}	4	3
Alt	(Argentina) TA Tirante	6^{9}	6	6
WC	(Colombia) N Mejía	6	5	7^{7}
4	(Australia) J Duckworth	2	7	6^{5}
6	(Chile) A Tabilo	5	6	4
(France) E Couacaud	7	3	6
(United Kingdom) J Choinski	4	6	6
2	(Colombia) DE Galán	6	3	2

Quarterfinals
Alt	(Argentina) TA Tirante	6	3	7^{7}
WC	(Colombia) N Mejía	1	6	6^{4}
(France) E Couacaud	1	2
(United Kingdom) J Choinski	6	6

Semifinals
Alt	(Argentina) TA Tirante	7^{7}	4	6
(United Kingdom) J Choinski	6^{5}	6	4
