= 2023 Mexico City Open – Doubles =

Doubles
- 2023 Mexico City Open

Final
- Champions: (Bolivia) Boris Arias (Bolivia) Federico Zeballos
- Runners-up: (United States) Evan King (United States) Reese Stalder
- Score: 7–5, 5–7, [10–2]

Events
Singles	Doubles
← 2022 ·	Mexico City Open	· 2024 →

Nicolás Jarry and Matheus Pucinelli de Almeida were the defending champions but chose not to defend their title.

Boris Arias and Federico Zeballos won the title after defeating Evan King and Reese Stalder 7–5, 5–7, [10–2] in the final.

== Seeds ==
1. (Sweden) André Göransson / (Japan) Ben McLachlan (quarterfinals)
2. (Kazakhstan) Andrey Golubev / (Kazakhstan) Aleksandr Nedovyesov (first round)
3. (United States) Robert Galloway / (Mexico) Miguel Ángel Reyes-Varela (semifinals)
4. (United States) William Blumberg / (United Kingdom) Julian Cash (quarterfinals)

== Draw ==
=== Key ===
- Q = Qualifier
- WC = Wild card
- LL = Lucky loser
- Alt = Alternate
- SE = Special exempt
- PR = Protected ranking
- ITF = ITF entry
- JE = Junior exempt
- w/o = Walkover
- r = Retired
- d = Defaulted
- SR = Special ranking

First round
1	(Sweden) A Göransson (Japan) B McLachlan	6	6
WC	(Mexico) Luciano Alcocer (Mexico) Armando Sotelo	2	2
(Philippines) R Gonzales (Zimbabwe) B Lock	6^{4}	3
(Bolivia) B Arias (Bolivia) F Zeballos	7^{7}	6
4	(United States) W Blumberg (United Kingdom) J Cash	6	3	[10]
(Chile) T Barrios Vera (Chile) A Tabilo	4	6	[6]
(Italy) L Darderi (Venezuela) LD Martínez	5	3
(France) J Eysseric (Netherlands) D Pel	7	6
(Ecuador) D Hidalgo (Colombia) C Rodríguez	6	6
(Mexico) H Hach Verdugo (Australia) L Saville	3	2
WC	(Mexico) R Pacheco Méndez (Argentina) TA Tirante	4	2
3	(United States) R Galloway (Mexico) MÁ Reyes-Varela	6	6
(United States) E King (United States) R Stalder	7	2	[13]
(Switzerland) A Bellier (France) E Couacaud	5	6	[11]
(United States) A Lawson (Austria) M Neuchrist	6	6
2	(Kazakhstan) A Golubev (Kazakhstan) A Nedovyesov	3	4

Quarterfinals
1	(Sweden) A Göransson (Japan) B McLachlan	6	4	[8]
(Bolivia) B Arias (Bolivia) F Zeballos	4	6	[10]
4	(United States) W Blumberg (United Kingdom) J Cash	5	2
(France) J Eysseric (Netherlands) D Pel	7	6
(Ecuador) D Hidalgo (Colombia) C Rodríguez	1	6	[7]
3	(United States) R Galloway (Mexico) MÁ Reyes-Varela	6	4	[10]
(United States) E King (United States) R Stalder	6^{4}	7	[10]
(United States) A Lawson (Austria) M Neuchrist	7^{7}	5	[8]

Semifinals
(Bolivia) B Arias (Bolivia) F Zeballos	7^{7}	7^{11}
(France) J Eysseric (Netherlands) D Pel	6^{4}	6^{9}
3	(United States) R Galloway (Mexico) MÁ Reyes-Varela	6^{3}	6^{5}
(United States) E King (United States) R Stalder	7^{7}	7^{7}

Final
(Bolivia) B Arias (Bolivia) F Zeballos	7	5	[10]
(United States) E King (United States) R Stalder	5	7	[2]
