= 2026 Mexico City Open =

- Date: 6 – 12 April
- Edition: 5th
- Surface: Clay
- Location: Mexico City, Mexico

Champions

Singles
- (Australia) James Duckworth

Doubles
- (Mexico) Santiago González / (United States) Ryan Seggerman
- Mexico City Open

The 2026 Mexico City Open presentado por Banco BX+ was a professional tennis tournament played on clay courts. It was the fifth edition of the tournament which was part of the 2026 ATP Challenger Tour. It took place in Mexico City, Mexico between 6 and 12 April 2026.

== Singles main-draw entrants ==
=== Seeds ===
Country	Player	Rank^{1}	Seed
AUS	James Duckworth	95	1
AUS	Tristan Schoolkate	119	2
USA	Mackenzie McDonald	125	3
COL	Nicolás Mejía	171	4
GBR	Jay Clarke	185	5
ARG	Juan Pablo Ficovich	198	6
FRA	Luka Pavlovic	209	7
SUI	Marc-Andrea Hüsler	219	8

- ^{1} Rankings are as of 30 March 2026.

=== Other entrants ===
The following players received wildcards into the singles main draw:

- (Mexico) Rodrigo Alujas
- (Mexico) Alex Hernández
- (Mexico) Alan Magadán

The following player received entry into the singles main draw using a protected ranking:

- (United States) Aidan Mayo

The following player received entry into the singles main draw as an alternate:

- (France) Corentin Denolly

The following players received entry from the qualifying draw:

- (Slovenia) Bor Artnak
- (Belgium) Tibo Colson
- (Mexico) Alejandro Hayen
- (Ukraine) Vladyslav Orlov
- (United States) Karl Poling
- (Colombia) Miguel Tobón

== Champions ==
=== Singles ===
- (Australia) James Duckworth def. (Italy) Stefano Napolitano 6–7^{(7–9)}, 7–6^{(7–3)}, 6–2.

=== Doubles ===
- (Mexico) Santiago González / (United States) Ryan Seggerman def. (Ecuador) Diego Hidalgo / (United States) Patrik Trhac 6–4, 4–6, [10–8].
