= 2025 Serve First Open – Singles =

Singles
- 2025 Serve First Open

Final
- Champion: (Italy) Mattia Bellucci
- Runner-up: (Kazakhstan) Alexander Shevchenko
- Score: 7–6^{(7–5)}, 3–1 ret.

Events
Singles	Doubles
- Serve First Open

This was the first edition of the tournament.

Mattia Bellucci won the title after Alexander Shevchenko retired trailing 6–7^{(5–7)}, 1–3 in the final.

== Seeds ==
The top four seeds received a bye into the second round.

1. (Belgium) Zizou Bergs (second round)
2. (Japan) Kei Nishikori (withdrew)
3. (Italy) Mattia Bellucci (champion)
4. (Austria) Filip Misolic (quarterfinals)
5. (Kazakhstan) Alexander Shevchenko (final, retired)
6. (Georgia (country)) Nikoloz Basilashvili (quarterfinals, retired)
7. (Japan) Shintaro Mochizuki (semifinals)
8. (Slovakia) Lukáš Klein (quarterfinals)
9. (Portugal) Jaime Faria (semifinals)

== Draw ==
Key

- Q = Qualifier
- WC = Wild card
- LL = Lucky loser
- Alt = Alternate
- ITF = ITF entry
- PR = Protected ranking
- SR = Special ranking
- SE = Special exempt
- JE = Junior exempt
- JR = Junior Accelerator Programme entrant
- CO = College Accelerator Programme entrant
- NG = Next Gen Accelerator Program entrant
- w/o = Walkover
- r = Retired
- d = Defaulted

=== Finals ===
Semifinals
9	(Portugal) Jaime Faria	0	4
3	(Italy) Mattia Bellucci	6	6
7	(Japan) Shintaro Mochizuki	6	1	1
5	(Kazakhstan) Alexander Shevchenko	4	6	6

Final
3	(Italy) Mattia Bellucci	7^{7}	3
5	(Kazakhstan) Alexander Shevchenko	6^{5}	1^{r}

=== Top half ===
First round
Alt	(Estonia) M Lajal	1	6	7
LL	(United States) S Kirchheimer	6	3	5
WC	(United States) K Bigun	6	6
Alt	(Japan) R Sakamoto	3	1
(Lebanon) H Habib	7^{11}	1	5
9	(Portugal) J Faria	6^{9}	6	7
Alt	(Portugal) H Rocha	3	6	6
Q	(United States) M Damm	6	3	4
(Australia) J McCabe	3	7	0
Q	(United Kingdom) J Fearnley	6	5	0^{r}
Q	(United States) R Seggerman	4	0^{r}
8	(Slovakia) L Klein	6	0

Second round
1	(Belgium) Z Bergs	4	3
Alt	(Estonia) M Lajal	6	6
WC	(United States) K Bigun	6	0	1^{r}
9	(Portugal) J Faria	3	6	4
3	(Italy) M Bellucci	7^{7}	6
Alt	(Portugal) H Rocha	6^{5}	4
(Australia) J McCabe	5	1
8	(Slovakia) L Klein	7	6

Quarterfinals
Alt	(Estonia) M Lajal	7	4	6^{8}
9	(Portugal) J Faria	5	6	7^{10}
3	(Italy) M Bellucci	6	6
8	(Slovakia) L Klein	4	2

Semifinals
9	(Portugal) J Faria	0	4
3	(Italy) M Bellucci	6	6

=== Bottom half ===
First round
7	(Japan) S Mochizuki	7	7^{7}
WC	(United States) A Rybakov	5	6^{2}
LL	(United States) K Poling	1	6	6
(United Kingdom) D Evans	6	4	4
Alt	(Japan) J Trotter	6	6
(Spain) M Landaluce	4	3
6	(Georgia (country)) N Basilashvili	6	3	7
(United States) C Eubanks	3	6	5
WC	(United States) Dar Blanch	5	6	3
Alt	(United States) M Cassone	7	3	6
(Japan) Y Nishioka	3	5
Alt	(Japan) S Shimabukuro	6	7

Second round
7	(Japan) S Mochizuki	6	6
LL	(United States) K Poling	3	0
Alt	(Japan) J Trotter	3	6^{1}
4	(Austria) F Misolic	6	7^{7}
6	(Georgia (country)) N Basilashvili	2	6	6
Alt	(United States) M Cassone	6	3	1
Alt	(Japan) S Shimabukuro	3	3
5	(Kazakhstan) A Shevchenko	6	6

Quarterfinals
7	(Japan) S Mochizuki	6	4	6
4	(Austria) F Misolic	4	6	4
6	(Georgia (country)) N Basilashvili	6	6^{3}	1^{r}
5	(Kazakhstan) A Shevchenko	3	7^{7}	4

Semifinals
7	(Japan) S Mochizuki	6	1	1
5	(Kazakhstan) A Shevchenko	4	6	6
