= 2026 Mexico City Open – Doubles =

Doubles
- 2026 Mexico City Open

Final
- Champions: (Mexico) Santiago González (United States) Ryan Seggerman
- Runners-up: (Ecuador) Diego Hidalgo (United States) Patrik Trhac
- Score: 6–4, 4–6, [10–8]

Events
Singles	Doubles
- Mexico City Open

Santiago González and Austin Krajicek were the defending champions but only González chose to defend his title, partnering Ryan Seggerman. He successfully defended his title after defeating Diego Hidalgo and Patrik Trhac 6–4, 4–6, [10–8] in the final.

== Seeds ==
1. (Mexico) Santiago González / (United States) Ryan Seggerman (champions)
2. (Ecuador) Diego Hidalgo / (United States) Patrik Trhac (final)
3. (Mexico) Miguel Ángel Reyes-Varela / (Bolivia) Federico Zeballos (quarterfinals)
4. (Australia) Jake Delaney / (Australia) Marc Polmans (first round)

== Draw ==
Key

- Q = Qualifier
- WC = Wild card
- LL = Lucky loser
- Alt = Alternate
- ITF = ITF entry
- PR = Protected ranking
- SR = Special ranking
- SE = Special exempt
- JE = Junior exempt
- JR = Junior Accelerator Programme entrant
- CO = College Accelerator Programme entrant
- NG = Next Gen Accelerator Program entrant
- w/o = Walkover
- r = Retired
- d = Defaulted

First round
1	(Mexico) S González (United States) R Seggerman	6	6
(United States) P Kumar (United States) K Poling	2	4
WC	(Mexico) AF Rubio Fierros (Mexico) M Sánchez	6^{5}	7^{9}	[4]
(Antigua and Barbuda) J Maginley (Colombia) N Mejía	7^{7}	6^{7}	[10]
4	(Australia) Ja Delaney (Australia) M Polmans	4	3
(Netherlands) T Loof (United States) D Milavsky	6	6
WC	(Mexico) A Hernández (Mexico) A Magadán	6	7^{7}
(United States) A Ayeni (United Kingdom) J Clarke	2	6^{4}
(United States) N Lammons (United States) J Withrow	7^{7}	6
(France) C Denolly (Spain) Iván Marrero Curbelo	6^{4}	3
(Australia) P Harper (Australia) T Schoolkate	4	4
3	(Mexico) M Reyes-Varela (Bolivia) F Zeballos	6	6
(Ukraine) V Orlov (France) L Pavlovic	6	7^{8}
(Brazil) M Alves (Chile) M Soto	1	6^{6}
(Argentina) F Mena (Mexico) R Pacheco Méndez	6^{2}	5
2	(Ecuador) D Hidalgo (United States) P Trhac	7^{7}	7

Quarterfinals
1	(Mexico) S González (United States) R Seggerman	6	6
(Antigua and Barbuda) J Maginley (Colombia) N Mejía	3	4
(Netherlands) T Loof (United States) D Milavsky	6	6
WC	(Mexico) A Hernández (Mexico) A Magadán	1	2
(United States) N Lammons (United States) J Withrow	6	3	[10]
3	(Mexico) M Reyes-Varela (Bolivia) F Zeballos	3	6	[6]
(Ukraine) V Orlov (France) L Pavlovic	3	2
2	(Ecuador) D Hidalgo (United States) P Trhac	6	6

Semifinals
1	(Mexico) S González (United States) R Seggerman	6	6
(Netherlands) T Loof (United States) D Milavsky	4	1
(United States) N Lammons (United States) J Withrow	6^{5}	7^{8}	[8]
2	(Ecuador) D Hidalgo (United States) P Trhac	7^{7}	6^{6}	[10]

Final
1	(Mexico) S González (United States) R Seggerman	6	4	[10]
2	(Ecuador) D Hidalgo (United States) P Trhac	4	6	[8]
