= 2025 Serve First Open – Doubles =

Doubles
- 2025 Serve First Open

Final
- Champions: (United States) Ryan Seggerman (United States) Patrik Trhac
- Runners-up: (India) Sriram Balaji (India) Rithvik Choudary Bollipalli
- Score: 6–4, 7–6^{(7–3)}

Events
Singles	Doubles
- Serve First Open

This was the first edition of the tournament.

Ryan Seggerman and Patrik Trhac won the title after defeating Sriram Balaji and Rithvik Choudary Bollipalli 6–4, 7–6^{(7–3)} in the final.

== Seeds ==
1. (Germany) Jakob Schnaitter / (Germany) Mark Wallner (quarterfinals)
2. (India) Sriram Balaji / (India) Rithvik Choudary Bollipalli (final)
3. (United States) Vasil Kirkov / (Netherlands) Bart Stevens (semifinals)
4. (United States) Ryan Seggerman / (United States) Patrik Trhac (champions)

== Draw ==
Key

- Q = Qualifier
- WC = Wild card
- LL = Lucky loser
- Alt = Alternate
- ITF = ITF entry
- PR = Protected ranking
- SR = Special ranking
- SE = Special exempt
- JE = Junior exempt
- JR = Junior Accelerator Programme entrant
- CO = College Accelerator Programme entrant
- NG = Next Gen Accelerator Program entrant
- w/o = Walkover
- r = Retired
- d = Defaulted

=== Draw ===
First round
(Chinese Taipei) J Jung (United States) R Stalder	6	6
(Costa Rica) J Flores (United States) K Poling	3	1
(Austria) F Misolic (Kazakhstan) A Shevchenko	4	7	[4]
WC	(France) M Westphal (United States) T Winegar	6	5	[10]
(Australia) J McCabe (Australia) L Saville	2	3
(United States) T Hilderbrand (United States) M Kiger	6	6

Quarterfinals
1	(Germany) J Schnaitter (Germany) M Wallner	5	3
(Chinese Taipei) J Jung (United States) R Stalder	7	6
4	(United States) R Seggerman (United States) P Trhac	6	7^{8}
WC	(France) M Westphal (United States) T Winegar	4	6^{6}
(United States) T Hilderbrand (United States) M Kiger	7^{16}	4	[6]
3	(United States) V Kirkov (Netherlands) B Stevens	6^{14}	6	[10]
(Australia) P Harper (Thailand) P Isaro	4	6	[10]
2	(India) S Balaji (India) RC Bollipalli	6	4	[12]

Semifinals
(Chinese Taipei) J Jung (United States) R Stalder	4	4
4	(United States) R Seggerman (United States) P Trhac	6	6
3	(United States) V Kirkov (Netherlands) B Stevens	5	6^{6}
2	(India) S Balaji (India) RC Bollipalli	7	7^{8}

Final
4	(United States) R Seggerman (United States) P Trhac	6	7^{7}
2	(India) S Balaji (India) RC Bollipalli	4	6^{3}
