= 2026 Mexico City Open – Singles =

Singles
- 2026 Mexico City Open

Final
- Champion: (Australia) James Duckworth
- Runner-up: (Italy) Stefano Napolitano
- Score: 6–7^{(7–9)}, 7–6^{(7–3)}, 6–2

Events
Singles	Doubles
- Mexico City Open

Felipe Meligeni Alves was the defending champion but chose not to defend his title.

James Duckworth won the title after defeating Stefano Napolitano 6–7^{(7–9)}, 7–6^{(7–3)}, 6–2 in the final.

== Seeds ==
1. (Australia) James Duckworth (champion)
2. (Australia) Tristan Schoolkate (quarterfinals)
3. (United States) Mackenzie McDonald (first round)
4. (Colombia) Nicolás Mejía (second round)
5. (United Kingdom) Jay Clarke (first round)
6. (Argentina) Juan Pablo Ficovich (second round)
7. (France) Luka Pavlovic (semifinals)
8. (Switzerland) Marc-Andrea Hüsler (first round)

== Draw ==
Key

- Q = Qualifier
- WC = Wild card
- LL = Lucky loser
- Alt = Alternate
- ITF = ITF entry
- PR = Protected ranking
- SR = Special ranking
- SE = Special exempt
- JE = Junior exempt
- JR = Junior Accelerator Programme entrant
- CO = College Accelerator Programme entrant
- NG = Next Gen Accelerator Program entrant
- w/o = Walkover
- r = Retired
- d = Defaulted

=== Finals ===
Semifinals
1	(Australia) James Duckworth	7^{9}	6
Q	(Belgium) Tibo Colson	6^{7}	4
7	(France) Luka Pavlovic	3	4
(Italy) Stefano Napolitano	6	6

Final
1	(Australia) James Duckworth	6^{7}	7^{7}	6
(Italy) Stefano Napolitano	7^{9}	6^{3}	2

=== Top half ===
First round
1	(Australia) J Duckworth	6	6
(United States) M Mmoh	4	3
(France) Raphael Perot	3	1
(United States) S Kozlov	6	6
Q	(Mexico) Alejandro Hayen	1	4
(Kazakhstan) B Zhukayev	6	6
Alt	(France) C Denolly	1	6	6
8	(Switzerland) M-A Hüsler	6	2	1
4	(Colombia) N Mejía	3	7^{7}	6
Q	(Ukraine) V Orlov	6	6^{3}	0
Q	(Belgium) T Colson	1	6	6
Q	(Colombia) Miguel Tobón	6	3	3
WC	(Mexico) A Hernández	7	6
Q	(United States) K Poling	5	4
(United States) D Milavsky	4	3
6	(Argentina) JP Ficovich	6	6

Second round
1	(Australia) J Duckworth	6	6
(United States) S Kozlov	3	2
(Kazakhstan) B Zhukayev	7	7^{7}
Alt	(France) C Denolly	5	6^{5}
4	(Colombia) N Mejía	5	3
Q	(Belgium) T Colson	7	6
WC	(Mexico) A Hernández	7	4	6
6	(Argentina) JP Ficovich	5	6	4

Quarterfinals
1	(Australia) J Duckworth	4	6	6
(Kazakhstan) B Zhukayev	6	3	4
Q	(Belgium) T Colson	7^{7}	2	7
WC	(Mexico) A Hernández	6^{5}	6	5

Semifinals
1	(Australia) J Duckworth	7^{9}	6
Q	(Belgium) T Colson	6^{7}	4

=== Bottom half ===
First round
7	(France) L Pavlovic	7^{7}	4	6
(Argentina) F Mena	6^{4}	6	2
(Canada) D Martin	6	3	6^{2}
PR	(United States) A Mayo	3	6	7^{7}
Q	(Slovenia) B Artnak	6	4	6
WC	(Mexico) A Magadán	3	6	4
(Mexico) R Pacheco Méndez	6	6
3	(United States) M McDonald	2	2
5	(United Kingdom) J Clarke	6	3	5
(Chile) M Soto	1	6	7
(United States) A Martin	4	4
(Italy) S Napolitano	6	6
(Australia) M Polmans	6	6
WC	(Mexico) Rodrigo Alujas	1	1
(Jamaica) B Bicknell	5	5
2	(Australia) T Schoolkate	7	7

Second round
7	(France) L Pavlovic	6	3	7^{10}
PR	(United States) A Mayo	1	6	6^{8}
Q	(Slovenia) B Artnak	4	6	5
(Mexico) R Pacheco Méndez	6	3	7
(Chile) M Soto	1	6^{8}
(Italy) S Napolitano	6	7^{10}
(Australia) M Polmans	6^{5}	5
2	(Australia) T Schoolkate	7^{7}	7

Quarterfinals
7	(France) L Pavlovic	2	6	7^{7}
(Mexico) R Pacheco Méndez	6	4	6^{1}
(Italy) S Napolitano	3	6	6
2	(Australia) T Schoolkate	6	1	4

Semifinals
7	(France) L Pavlovic	3	4
(Italy) S Napolitano	6	6
