= 2026 Los Cabos Open =

- Date: 27 July–1 August
- Edition: 10th
- Draw: 28S / 16D
- Surface: Hard / outdoor
- Location: Los Cabos, Mexico
- Venue: Cabo Sports Complex

Champions

Singles
- (France) Arthur Géa

Doubles
- (United States) Ryan Seggerman / (United States) Patrik Trhac
- Los Cabos Open

The 2026 Los Cabos Open (known as the Mifel Tennis Open by Telcel Oppo for sponsorship reasons) was an ATP tennis tournament played on outdoor hardcourts. It was the 10th edition of the tournament, and part of the ATP 250 series of the 2026 ATP Tour. It took place in Los Cabos, Mexico from 27 July through 1 August 2026.

== Champions ==
=== Singles ===
- (France) Arthur Géa def. (Canada) Denis Shapovalov 6–3, 6–4.

=== Doubles ===
- (United States) Ryan Seggerman / (United States) Patrik Trhac def. (New Zealand) Finn Reynolds / (New Zealand) James Watt 7–6^{(7–4)}, 6–7^{(5–7)}, [10–8].

== Singles main-draw entrants ==
=== Seeds ===
Country	Player	Rank^{1}	Seed
CZE	Jiří Lehečka	12	1
ITA	Luciano Darderi	21	2
ARG	Francisco Cerúndolo	22	3
	Karen Khachanov	26	4
GBR	Cameron Norrie	39	5
FRA	Corentin Moutet	40	6
ESP	Martín Landaluce	62	7
CAN	Denis Shapovalov	67	8

- Rankings are as of 20 July 2026.

=== Other entrants ===
The following players received wildcards into the main draw:

- (Bulgaria) ~~Grigor Dimitrov~~
- (France) Moïse Kouamé
- (Mexico) Rodrigo Pacheco Méndez

The following player received entry through the Next Gen Accelerator program:

- (United States) Darwin Blanch

The following players received entry from the qualifying draw:

- (United States) Tristan Boyer
- (Mexico) Alex Hernández
- (South Korea) Kwon Soon-woo
- (United States) Aidan Mayo

The following players received entry as lucky losers:

- (Australia) Bernard Tomic
- (Australia) Edward Winter

=== Withdrawals ===
- (Argentina) Sebastián Báez → replaced by (Canada) Gabriel Diallo
- (Argentina) Román Andrés Burruchaga → replaced by (Hong Kong) Coleman Wong
- (Bulgaria) Grigor Dimitrov → replaced by (Australia) Edward Winter
- (Argentina) Mariano Navone → replaced by (Australia) Bernard Tomic
- (Argentina) Thiago Agustín Tirante → replaced by (United States) Michael Zheng
- (Argentina) Camilo Ugo Carabelli → replaced by (Czech Republic) Dalibor Svrčina

== Doubles main-draw entrants ==
=== Seeds ===
Country	Player	Country	Player	Rank^{1}	Seed
USA	Rajeev Ram	GBR	Joe Salisbury	67	1
BRA	Orlando Luz	BRA	Rafael Matos	84	2
USA	Robert Galloway	USA	Evan King	96	3
NED	Jean-Julien Rojer	USA	Theodore Winegar	141	4

- ^{1} Rankings are as of 20 July 2026.

=== Other entrants ===
The following pairs received wildcards into the doubles main draw:

- (Mexico) Luis Carlos Álvarez / (Mexico) Alan Magadán
- (Mexico) Alex Hernández / (Colombia) Nicolás Mejía

The following pair received entry as alternates:

- ~~(Czech Republic) Dalibor Svrčina / (Australia) Bernard Tomic~~

=== Withdrawal ===
- (United States) Tristan Boyer / (Australia) Edward Winter → not replaced
