= 2025 Croatia Open Umag =

- Date: 20–26 July
- Edition: 35th
- Category: ATP 250
- Draw: 28S / 16D
- Surface: Clay
- Location: Umag, Croatia

Champions

Singles
- (Italy) Luciano Darderi

Doubles
- (Monaco) Romain Arneodo / (France) Manuel Guinard
- Croatia Open

The 2025 Croatia Open Umag, also known as the Plava Laguna Croatia Open Umag (for sponsorship reasons), was a men's tennis tournament played on outdoor clay courts. It was the 35th edition of the Croatia Open, and an ATP 250 tournament on the 2025 ATP Tour. It took place at the International Tennis Center in Umag, Croatia, from 20 July until 26 July 2025. Second-seeded Luciano Darderi won the singles title.

== Finals ==
=== Singles ===
- (Italy) Luciano Darderi defeated (Spain) Carlos Taberner, 6–3, 6–3

=== Doubles ===
- (Monaco) Romain Arneodo / (France) Manuel Guinard defeated (United States) Patrik Trhac / (United Kingdom) Marcus Willis, 7−5, 7−6^{(7−2)}

== Singles main draw entrants ==
=== Seeds ===
Country	Player	Rank^{1}	Seed
ARG	Francisco Cerúndolo	20	1
ITA	Luciano Darderi	55	2
ARG	Camilo Ugo Carabelli	59	3
BIH	Damir Džumhur	70	4
ARG	Mariano Navone	75	5
ESP	Roberto Carballés Baena	79	6
POL	Kamil Majchrzak	81	7
CZE	Vít Kopřiva	83	8

- ^{1} Rankings are as of 14 July 2025.

=== Other entrants ===
The following players received wildcards into the main draw:

- (Croatia) Matej Dodig
- (Croatia) Mili Poljičak
- (Croatia) Dino Prižmić

The following player received entry as an emergency subtitution:

- (Switzerland) Stan Wawrinka

The following players received entry from the qualifying draw:

- (France) Titouan Droguet
- (Ecuador) Álvaro Guillén Meza
- (Spain) Pablo Llamas Ruiz
- (Italy) Giulio Zeppieri

=== Withdrawals ===
- (Netherlands) Tallon Griekspoor → replaced by (France) Pierre-Hugues Herbert
- (Poland) Hubert Hurkacz → replaced by (Italy) Francesco Passaro
- (France) Valentin Royer → replaced by (Serbia) Dušan Lajović
- (Greece) Stefanos Tsitsipas → replaced by (Switzerland) Stan Wawrinka

== Doubles main draw entrants ==
=== Seeds ===
Country	Player	Country	Player	Rank^{1}	Seed
ARG	Guido Andreozzi	NED	Sander Arends	72	1
CZE	Adam Pavlásek	POL	Jan Zieliński	80	2
~~CRO~~	~~Ivan Dodig~~	~~GBR~~	~~Jamie Murray~~	~~87~~	~~3~~
MON	Romain Arneodo	FRA	Manuel Guinard	98	4

- ^{1} Rankings as of 14 July 2025.

=== Other entrants ===
The following pairs received wildcards into the doubles main draw:

- (Croatia) Matej Dodig / (Croatia) Nino Serdarušić
- (Croatia) Luka Mikrut / (Croatia) Mili Poljičak

=== Withdrawals ===
- (Spain) Roberto Carballés Baena / (Spain) David Vega Hernández → replaced by (United States) Patrik Trhac / (United Kingdom) Marcus Willis
- (Croatia) Ivan Dodig / (United Kingdom) Jamie Murray → no replacement
