= 2024 Mexico City Open – Singles =

Singles
- 2024 Mexico City Open

Final
- Champion: (Argentina) Thiago Agustín Tirante
- Runner-up: (Canada) Alexis Galarneau
- Score: 6–1, 6–3

Events
| Singles | Doubles |
- Mexico City Open

Dominik Koepfer was the defending champion but chose not to defend his title.

Thiago Agustín Tirante won the title after defeating Alexis Galarneau 6–1, 6–3 in the final.

== Seeds ==
1. (Argentina) Thiago Agustín Tirante (champion)
2. (Australia) Adam Walton (first round)
3. (France) Giovanni Mpetshi Perricard (second round)
4. (Australia) Marc Polmans (second round)
5. (Kazakhstan) Beibit Zhukayev (quarterfinals)
6. (United Kingdom) Oliver Crawford (quarterfinals)
7. (Australia) Omar Jasika (first round)
8. (Switzerland) Marc-Andrea Hüsler (first round)

== Draw ==
Key

- Q = Qualifier
- WC = Wild card
- LL = Lucky loser
- Alt = Alternate
- ITF = ITF entry
- PR = Protected ranking
- SR = Special ranking
- SE = Special exempt
- JE = Junior exempt
- JR = Junior Accelerator Programme entrant
- CO = College Accelerator Programme entrant
- NG = Next Gen Accelerator Program entrant
- w/o = Walkover
- r = Retired
- d = Defaulted

=== Finals ===
Semifinals
1 | (Argentina) Thiago Agustín Tirante | 6 | 7^{7}
(Australia) Bernard Tomic | 4 | 6^{2}
(France) Maxime Janvier | 6^{3} | 6 | 3
(Canada) Alexis Galarneau | 7^{7} | 4 | 6

Final
1 | (Argentina) Thiago Agustín Tirante | 6 | 6
(Canada) Alexis Galarneau | 1 | 3

=== Top half ===
First round
1 | (Argentina) TA Tirante | 7 | 6
(Italy) F Gaio | 5 | 3
Q | (Germany) Elmar Ejupovic | 4 | 3
(Argentina) JP Ficovich | 6 | 6
Q | (South Korea) G Campaña Lee | 6^{2} | 6 | 5
(Bolivia) M Dellien | 7^{7} | 3 | 7
WC | (Mexico) E Escobedo | 6^{5} | 4
6 | (United Kingdom) O Crawford | 7^{7} | 6
4 | (Australia) M Polmans | 6 | 2 | 6
(Australia) T Schoolkate | 3 | 6 | 2
Q | (Mexico) A Hernández | 6 | 4 | 5
Q | (Tunisia) S Mansouri | 4 | 6 | 7
(Portugal) G Oliveira | 6 | 6
Q | (United States) A Ayeni | 4 | 2
(Australia) B Tomic | 6 | 6
7 | (Australia) O Jasika | 3 | 1

Second round
1 | (Argentina) TA Tirante | 7 | 6
(Argentina) JP Ficovich | 5 | 1
(Bolivia) M Dellien | 2 | 4
6 | (United Kingdom) O Crawford | 6 | 6
4 | (Australia) M Polmans | 4 | 6 | 5
Q | (Tunisia) S Mansouri | 6 | 3 | 7
(Portugal) G Oliveira | 6^{4} | 2
(Australia) B Tomic | 7^{7} | 6

Quarterfinals
1 | (Argentina) TA Tirante | 6 | 6
6 | (United Kingdom) O Crawford | 4 | 4
Q | (Tunisia) S Mansouri | 7^{7} | 4 | 4
(Australia) B Tomic | 6^{5} | 6 | 6

Semifinals
1 | (Argentina) TA Tirante | 6 | 7^{7}
(Australia) B Tomic | 4 | 6^{2}

=== Bottom half ===
First round
8 | (Switzerland) M-A Hüsler | 7^{7} | 4 | 2
(United States) A Mayo | 6^{2} | 6 | 6
(Italy) A Giannessi | 6 | 3 | 6
WC | (Canada) V Pospisil | 3 | 6 | 4
(France) M Janvier | 3 | 6 | 6
(United States) T-S Kwiatkowski | 6 | 3 | 1
SE | (Chile) M Soto | 6 | 6^{6} | 4
3 | (France) G Mpetshi Perricard | 4 | 7^{8} | 6
5 | (Kazakhstan) B Zhukayev | 4 | 6 | 6
Q | (Zimbabwe) B Lock | 6 | 3 | 4
WC | (Mexico) R Pacheco Méndez | 6^{8} | 6 | 7^{9}
(Switzerland) A Bellier | 7^{10} | 4 | 6^{7}
(Italy) G Fonio | 3 | 2
SE | (Colombia) N Mejía | 6 | 6
(Canada) A Galarneau | 6 | 7^{7}
2 | (Australia) A Walton | 3 | 6^{5}

Second round
(United States) A Mayo | 3 | 7^{7} | 6
(Italy) A Giannessi | 6 | 6^{4} | 3
(France) M Janvier | 4 | 7^{9} | 6
3 | (France) G Mpetshi Perricard | 6 | 6^{7} | 3
5 | (Kazakhstan) B Zhukayev | 6 | 6
WC | (Mexico) R Pacheco Méndez | 3 | 4
SE | (Colombia) N Mejía | 1 | 4
(Canada) A Galarneau | 6 | 6

Quarterfinals
(United States) A Mayo | 1 | 3
(France) M Janvier | 6 | 6
5 | (Kazakhstan) B Zhukayev | 6^{8} | 4
(Canada) A Galarneau | 7^{10} | 6

Semifinals
(France) M Janvier | 6^{3} | 6 | 3
(Canada) A Galarneau | 7^{7} | 4 | 6
