= 2025 Croatia Open Umag – Doubles =

Doubles
- 2025 Croatia Open Umag

Final
- Champions: (Monaco) Romain Arneodo (France) Manuel Guinard
- Runners-up: (United States) Patrik Trhac (United Kingdom) Marcus Willis
- Score: 7−5, 7−6^{(7−2)}

Details
- Draw: 16
- Seeds: 4

Events
Singles	Doubles
- Croatia Open

Romain Arneodo and Manuel Guinard defeated Patrik Trhac and Marcus Willis in the final, 7−5, 7−6^{(7−2)} to win the doubles tennis title at the 2025 Croatia Open Umag. It was the third ATP Tour doubles title for Arneodo and second for Guinard.

Guido Andreozzi and Miguel Ángel Reyes-Varela were the reigning champions, but Reyes-Varela chose to participate in Kitzbühel instead. Andreozzi partnered Sander Arends, but lost in the first round to Trhac and Willis.

== Seeds ==
1. (Argentina) Guido Andreozzi / (Netherlands) Sander Arends (first round)
2. (Czech Republic) Adam Pavlásek / (Poland) Jan Zieliński (quarterfinals)
3. (Croatia) Ivan Dodig / (United Kingdom) Jamie Murray (withdrew)
4. (Monaco) Romain Arneodo / (France) Manuel Guinard (champions)

== Draw ==
Key

- Q = Qualifier
- WC = Wild card
- LL = Lucky loser
- Alt = Alternate
- ITF = ITF entry
- PR = Protected ranking
- SR = Special ranking
- SE = Special exempt
- JE = Junior exempt
- JR = Junior Accelerator Programme entrant
- CO = College Accelerator Programme entrant
- NG = Next Gen Accelerator Program entrant
- w/o = Walkover
- r = Retired
- d = Defaulted

=== Draw ===
First round
1	(Argentina) G Andreozzi (Netherlands) S Arends	4	4
(United States) P Trhac (United Kingdom) M Willis	6	6
(United States) G Goldhoff (France) G Jacq	6	3	[10]
WC	(Croatia) L Mikrut (Croatia) M Poljičak	3	6	[7]
(United States) V Kirkov (Netherlands) B Stevens	2	3
(Poland) K Drzewiecki (Chinese Taipei) R Ho	6	6
(Brazil) M Demoliner (Belgium) S Gillé	5	6	[9]
PR	(Argentina) G Durán (Argentina) C Ugo Carabelli	7	4	[11]
WC	(Croatia) M Dodig (Croatia) N Serdarušić	2	6	[12]
4	(Monaco) R Arneodo (France) M Guinard	6	4	[14]
(France) T Arribagé (Brazil) O Luz	6	6
(Canada) C Harper (United States) R Seggerman	3	4
(Spain) Í Cervantes (Netherlands) M Middelkoop	6^{6}	4
2	(Czech Republic) A Pavlásek (Poland) J Zieliński	7^{8}	6

Quarterfinals
(United States) P Trhac (United Kingdom) M Willis	6	3	[10]
(United States) G Goldhoff (France) G Jacq	4	6	[6]
(Ecuador) G Escobar (Ecuador) D Hidalgo	6	7
(Poland) K Drzewiecki (Chinese Taipei) R Ho	3	5
PR	(Argentina) G Durán (Argentina) C Ugo Carabelli	5	6^{6}
4	(Monaco) R Arneodo (France) M Guinard	7	7^{8}
(France) T Arribagé (Brazil) O Luz	6^{3}	7	[10]
2	(Czech Republic) A Pavlásek (Poland) J Zieliński	7^{7}	5	[8]

Semifinals
(United States) P Trhac (United Kingdom) M Willis	6	6
(Ecuador) G Escobar (Ecuador) D Hidalgo	4	3
4	(Monaco) R Arneodo (France) M Guinard	6	6
(France) T Arribagé (Brazil) O Luz	3	4

Final
(United States) P Trhac (United Kingdom) M Willis	5	6^{2}
4	(Monaco) R Arneodo (France) M Guinard	7	7^{7}
