= 2025 Mexico City Open – Doubles =

Doubles
- 2025 Mexico City Open

Final
- Champions: (Mexico) Santiago González (United States) Austin Krajicek
- Runners-up: (United States) Ryan Seggerman (United States) Patrik Trhac
- Score: 7–6^{(11–9)}, 3–6, [10–5]

Events
Singles	Doubles
- Mexico City Open

Ryan Seggerman and Patrik Trhac were the defending champions but lost in the final to Santiago González and Austin Krajicek.

González and Krajicek won the title after defeating Seggerman and Trhac 7–6^{(11–9)}, 3–6, [10–5] in the final.

== Seeds ==
1. (India) Sriram Balaji / (Mexico) Miguel Ángel Reyes-Varela (semifinals)
2. (Colombia) Nicolás Barrientos / (India) Rithvik Choudary Bollipalli (quarterfinals)
3. (Mexico) Santiago González / (United States) Austin Krajicek (champions)
4. (Ecuador) Gonzalo Escobar / (Ecuador) Diego Hidalgo (semifinals)

== Draw ==
Key

- Q = Qualifier
- WC = Wild card
- LL = Lucky loser
- Alt = Alternate
- ITF = ITF entry
- PR = Protected ranking
- SR = Special ranking
- SE = Special exempt
- JE = Junior exempt
- JR = Junior Accelerator Programme entrant
- CO = College Accelerator Programme entrant
- NG = Next Gen Accelerator Program entrant
- w/o = Walkover
- r = Retired
- d = Defaulted

=== Draw ===
First round
1	(India) S Balaji (Mexico) M Reyes-Varela	6	6
PR	(Brazil) M Alves (Italy) S Napolitano	3	2
(Austria) N Oberleitner (Chile) M Soto	7	6
(Japan) S Watanabe (Japan) T Yuzuki	5	4
3	(Mexico) S González (United States) A Krajicek	6	6
WC	(Argentina) JP Ficovich (Mexico) R Pacheco Méndez	4	2
Alt	(Ukraine) V Orlov (Argentina) S Rodríguez Taverna	6^{8}	7	[3]
(Brazil) F Meligeni Alves (Brazil) M Zormann	7^{10}	5	[10]
(United States) M Kiger (United States) R Stalder	7	6
I Liutarevich (United Kingdom) M Willis	5	1
(Bolivia) B Arias (Bolivia) F Zeballos	3	4
4	(Ecuador) G Escobar (Ecuador) D Hidalgo	6	6
(United States) R Seggerman (United States) P Trhac	6	6
WC	(France) A Mannarino (United States) Lev Seidman	3	4
(Chinese Taipei) R Ho (Australia) MC Romios	6	3	[7]
2	(Colombia) N Barrientos (India) RC Bollipalli	3	6	[10]

Quarterfinals
1	(India) S Balaji (Mexico) M Reyes-Varela	3	6	[11]
(Austria) N Oberleitner (Chile) M Soto	6	3	[9]
3	(Mexico) S González (United States) A Krajicek	6	6
(Brazil) F Meligeni Alves (Brazil) M Zormann	2	3
(United States) M Kiger (United States) R Stalder	6^{3}	2
4	(Ecuador) G Escobar (Ecuador) D Hidalgo	7^{7}	6
(United States) R Seggerman (United States) P Trhac	6	7^{7}
2	(Colombia) N Barrientos (India) RC Bollipalli	4	6^{5}

Semifinals
1	(India) S Balaji (Mexico) M Reyes-Varela	4	5
3	(Mexico) S González (United States) A Krajicek	6	7
4	(Ecuador) G Escobar (Ecuador) D Hidalgo	6^{3}	6^{5}
(United States) R Seggerman (United States) P Trhac	7^{7}	7^{7}

Final
3	(Mexico) S González (United States) A Krajicek	7^{11}	3	[10]
(United States) R Seggerman (United States) P Trhac	6^{9}	6	[5]
