= 2024 Mexico City Open =

- Date: 1 – 7 April
- Edition: 3rd
- Surface: Clay
- Location: Mexico City, Mexico

Champions

Singles
- (Argentina) Thiago Agustín Tirante

Doubles
- (United States) Ryan Seggerman / (United States) Patrik Trhac
- Mexico City Open

The 2024 Mexico City Open was a professional tennis tournament played on clay courts. It was the third edition of the tournament which was part of the 2024 ATP Challenger Tour. It took place in Mexico City, Mexico between 1 and 7 April 2024.

== Singles main-draw entrants ==
=== Seeds ===
Country	Player	Rank^{1}	Seed
ARG	Thiago Agustín Tirante	99	1
AUS	Adam Walton	150	2
FRA	Giovanni Mpetshi Perricard	165	3
AUS	Marc Polmans	167	4
KAZ	Beibit Zhukayev	191	5
GBR	Oliver Crawford	203	6
AUS	Omar Jasika	208	7
SUI	Marc-Andrea Hüsler	209	8

- ^{1} Rankings are as of 18 March 2024.

=== Other entrants ===
The following players received wildcards into the singles main draw:

- (Mexico) Ernesto Escobedo
- (Mexico) Rodrigo Pacheco Méndez
- (Canada) Vasek Pospisil

The following players received entry into the singles main draw as special exempts:

- (Colombia) Nicolás Mejía
- (Chile) Matías Soto

The following players received entry from the qualifying draw:

- (United States) Alafia Ayeni
- (South Korea) Gerard Campaña Lee
- (Germany) Elmar Ejupovic
- (Mexico) Alex Hernández
- (Zimbabwe) Benjamin Lock
- (Tunisia) Skander Mansouri

== Champions ==
=== Singles ===
- (Argentina) Thiago Agustín Tirante def. (Canada) Alexis Galarneau 6–1, 6–3.

=== Doubles ===
- (United States) Ryan Seggerman / (United States) Patrik Trhac def. (Australia) Tristan Schoolkate / (Australia) Adam Walton 5–7, 6–4, [10–5].
