= 2023 Mexico City Open =

- Date: 27 March – 2 April
- Edition: 2nd
- Surface: Clay
- Location: Mexico City, Mexico

Champions

Singles
- (Germany) Dominik Koepfer

Doubles
- (Bolivia) Boris Arias / (Bolivia) Federico Zeballos
| ← 2022 · | Mexico City Open | · 2024 → |

The 2023 Mexico City Open was a professional tennis tournament played on clay courts. It was the second edition of the tournament which was part of the 2023 ATP Challenger Tour. It took place in Mexico City, Mexico between 27 March and 2 April 2023.

== Singles main-draw entrants ==
=== Seeds ===
| Country | Player | Rank^{1} | Seed |
|---|---|---|---|
| SUI | Marc-Andrea Hüsler | 47 | 1 |
| COL | Daniel Elahi Galán | 89 | 2 |
| ARG | Facundo Bagnis | 100 | 3 |
| AUS | James Duckworth | 112 | 4 |
| GER | Yannick Hanfmann | 134 | 5 |
| CHI | Alejandro Tabilo | 162 | 6 |
| BRA | Felipe Meligeni Alves | 164 | 7 |
| ITA | Luciano Darderi | 173 | 8 |

- ^{1} Rankings are as of 20 March 2023.

=== Other entrants ===
The following players received wildcards into the singles main draw:

- (Colombia) Nicolás Mejía
- (Mexico) Rodrigo Pacheco Méndez
- (Australia) Bernard Tomic

The following player received entry into the singles main draw as an alternate:

- (Argentina) Thiago Agustín Tirante

The following players received entry from the qualifying draw:

- (France) Térence Atmane
- (Germany) Elmar Ejupovic
- (Italy) Federico Gaio
- (Germany) Dominik Koepfer
- (Argentina) Juan Ignacio Londero
- (Austria) Maximilian Neuchrist

== Champions ==
=== Singles ===
- (Germany) Dominik Koepfer def. (Argentina) Thiago Agustín Tirante 2–6, 6–4, 6–2.

=== Doubles ===
- (Bolivia) Boris Arias / (Bolivia) Federico Zeballos def. (United States) Evan King / (United States) Reese Stalder 7–5, 5–7, [10–2].
