= 2025 Mexico City Open – Singles =

Singles
- 2025 Mexico City Open

Final
- Champion: (Brazil) Felipe Meligeni Alves
- Runner-up: (France) Luka Pavlovic
- Score: 6–3, 6–3

Events
Singles	Doubles
- Mexico City Open

Thiago Agustín Tirante was the defending champion but lost in the first round to Aziz Dougaz.

Felipe Meligeni Alves won the title after defeating Luka Pavlovic 6–3, 6–3 in the final.

== Seeds ==
1. (Australia) James Duckworth (second round)
2. (Argentina) Thiago Agustín Tirante (first round)
3. (France) Adrian Mannarino (semifinals)
4. (Brazil) Felipe Meligeni Alves (champion)
5. (Argentina) Juan Pablo Ficovich (first round)
6. (Canada) Alexis Galarneau (first round)
7. (Switzerland) Marc-Andrea Hüsler (semifinals)
8. (France) Hugo Grenier (withdrew)

== Draw ==
Key

- Q = Qualifier
- WC = Wild card
- LL = Lucky loser
- Alt = Alternate
- ITF = ITF entry
- PR = Protected ranking
- SR = Special ranking
- SE = Special exempt
- JE = Junior exempt
- JR = Junior Accelerator Programme entrant
- CO = College Accelerator Programme entrant
- NG = Next Gen Accelerator Program entrant
- w/o = Walkover
- r = Retired
- d = Defaulted

=== Finals ===
Semifinals
Alt	(France) Luka Pavlovic	6	7^{7}
3	(France) Adrian Mannarino	4	6^{3}
4	(Brazil) Felipe Meligeni Alves	3	6	7^{7}
7	(Switzerland) Marc-Andrea Hüsler	6	3	6^{3}

Final
Alt	(France) Luka Pavlovic	3	3
4	(Brazil) Felipe Meligeni Alves	6	6

=== Top half ===
First round
1	(Australia) J Duckworth	6	7^{7}
(Brazil) M Alves	3	6^{3}
(Argentina) S Rodríguez Taverna	1	4
(Peru) JP Varillas	6	6
Alt	(France) L Pavlovic	7^{7}	7^{8}
(Italy) S Napolitano	6^{5}	6^{6}
(Mexico) R Pacheco Méndez	6	6
6	(Canada) A Galarneau	3	3
3	(France) A Mannarino	7^{7}	6
(United States) A Mayo	6^{5}	4
(Colombia) N Mejía	7^{7}	6
Alt	(United States) M Cressy	6^{3}	3
WC	(Mexico) A Hernández	6	6
Q	(Brazil) P Sakamoto	3	1
(Australia) B Tomic	6	6
LL	(France) T Paris	4	2

Second round
1	(Australia) J Duckworth	6	4	4
(Peru) JP Varillas	2	6	6
Alt	(France) L Pavlovic	7^{7}	6
(Mexico) R Pacheco Méndez	6^{4}	3
3	(France) A Mannarino	6	2	6
(Colombia) N Mejía	2	6	2
WC	(Mexico) A Hernández	4	2
(Australia) B Tomic	6	6

Quarterfinals
(Peru) JP Varillas	3	6	4
Alt	(France) L Pavlovic	6	0	6
3	(France) A Mannarino	5	6	6
(Australia) B Tomic	7	1	1

Semifinals
Alt	(France) L Pavlovic	6	7^{7}
3	(France) A Mannarino	4	6^{3}

=== Bottom half ===
First round
5	(Argentina) JP Ficovich	6^{2}	4
Q	(United States) A Perez	7^{7}	6
Q	(Canada) JC Aguilar	1	0
Q	(United States) A Martin	6	6
WC	(Mexico) Rodrigo Alujas	6	2	3
WC	(United States) Dar Blanch	3	6	6
(Kazakhstan) B Zhukayev	6	3	6^{9}
4	(Brazil) F Meligeni Alves	3	6	7^{11}
7	(Switzerland) M-A Hüsler	7^{8}	6
(Germany) P Zahraj	6^{6}	1
(France) M Janvier	1	6	6^{7}
Q	(Austria) N Oberleitner	6	4	7^{9}
(Chile) M Soto	7^{7}	6
Q	(Austria) M Neuchrist	6^{5}	3
(Tunisia) A Dougaz	6	3	6
2	(Argentina) TA Tirante	3	6	3

Second round
Q	(United States) A Perez	6	7
Q	(United States) A Martin	1	5
WC	(United States) Dar Blanch	6^{4}	3
4	(Brazil) F Meligeni Alves	7^{7}	6
7	(Switzerland) M-A Hüsler	6	6
Q	(Austria) N Oberleitner	4	4
(Chile) M Soto	4	3
(Tunisia) A Dougaz	6	6

Quarterfinals
Q	(United States) A Perez	3	2
4	(Brazil) F Meligeni Alves	6	6
7	(Switzerland) M-A Hüsler	6^{7}	6	7
(Tunisia) A Dougaz	7^{9}	1	5

Semifinals
4	(Brazil) F Meligeni Alves	3	6	7^{7}
7	(Switzerland) M-A Hüsler	6	3	6^{3}
