= 2025 Queensland International =

- Date: 27 January – 2 February
- Edition: 1st
- Surface: Hard
- Location: Brisbane, Australia

Champions

Men's singles
- (Australia) Tristan Schoolkate

Women's singles
- (Australia) Priscilla Hon

Men's doubles
- (Australia) Matthew Romios / (Northern Mariana Islands) Colin Sinclair

Women's doubles
- (Australia) Petra Hule / (Australia) Elena Micic
- Brisbane QTC Tennis International

The 2025 Brisbane QTC Tennis International was a professional tennis tournament played on hardcourts. It was the first edition of the tournament which was part of the 2025 ATP Challenger Tour and 2025 ITF Women's World Tennis Tour. It took place in Brisbane, Australia between 27 January and 2 February 2025.

== Men's singles main-draw entrants ==
=== Seeds ===
Country	Player	Rank^{1}	Seed
AUS	Rinky Hijikata	72	1
AUS	Adam Walton	90	2
AUS	Li Tu	168	3
AUS	Alex Bolt	172	4
AUS	Tristan Schoolkate	173	5
AUS	Omar Jasika	179	6
JPN	Yuta Shimizu	193	7
AUS	Bernard Tomic	212	8

- ^{1} Rankings are as of 13 January 2025.

=== Other entrants ===
The following players received wildcards into the singles main draw:

- (Australia) Hayden Jones
- (Australia) Jason Kubler
- (Australia) Pavle Marinkov

The following players received entry from the qualifying draw:

- (Australia) Jacob Bradshaw
- (United States) Jacob Brumm
- (Japan) Shinji Hazawa
- (Australia) Matt Hulme
- (Japan) Kokoro Isomura
- (Ukraine) Illya Marchenko

== Champions ==
=== Men's singles ===
- (Australia) Tristan Schoolkate def. (Czech Republic) Marek Gengel 7–6^{(7–3)}, 7–6^{(7–4)}.

=== Women's singles ===
- (Australia) Priscilla Hon def. (Switzerland) Leonie Küng 6–4, 4–6, 6–2.

=== Men's doubles ===
- (Australia) Matthew Romios / (Northern Mariana Islands) Colin Sinclair def. (Australia) Joshua Charlton / (Australia) Patrick Harper 7–6^{(7–2)}, 7–5.

=== Women's doubles ===
- (Australia) Petra Hule / (Australia) Elena Micic def. (Australia) Lizette Cabrera / (Australia) Taylah Preston 2–6, 6–2, [10–6].
