= 2022 Mexico City Open – Singles =

Singles
- 2022 Mexico City Open

Final
- Champion: (Switzerland) Marc-Andrea Hüsler
- Runner-up: (Argentina) Tomás Martín Etcheverry
- Score: 6–4, 6–2

Events
Singles	Doubles
- Mexico City Open

This was the first edition of the tournament.

Marc-Andrea Hüsler won the title after defeating Tomás Martín Etcheverry 6–4, 6–2 in the final.

== Seeds ==
1. (Argentina) Facundo Bagnis (first round)
2. (Argentina) Tomás Martín Etcheverry (final)
3. (United States) Stefan Kozlov (first round, retired)
4. (Slovakia) Andrej Martin (first round)
5. (Argentina) Juan Ignacio Londero (second round)
6. (United States) Ernesto Escobedo (first round)
7. (Chile) Nicolás Jarry (semifinals)
8. (United Kingdom) Jay Clarke (second round)

== Draw ==
Key

- Q = Qualifier
- WC = Wild card
- LL = Lucky loser
- Alt = Alternate
- ITF = ITF entry
- PR = Protected ranking
- SR = Special ranking
- SE = Special exempt
- JE = Junior exempt
- JR = Junior Accelerator Programme entrant
- CO = College Accelerator Programme entrant
- NG = Next Gen Accelerator Program entrant
- w/o = Walkover
- r = Retired
- d = Defaulted

=== Finals ===
Semifinals
(Switzerland) Marc-Andrea Hüsler	7^{7}	6
(Brazil) Felipe Meligeni Alves	6^{5}	2
7/WC	(Chile) Nicolás Jarry	6	5	6^{4}
2	(Argentina) Tomás Martín Etcheverry	3	7	7^{7}

Final
(Switzerland) Marc-Andrea Hüsler	6	6
2	(Argentina) Tomás Martín Etcheverry	4	2

=== Top half ===
First round
1	(Argentina) F Bagnis	3	2
(Argentina) JP Ficovich	6	6
(Switzerland) M-A Hüsler	3	6	6
Q	(Brazil) Gilbert Klier Júnior	6	3	4
(France) M Janvier	6	7^{7}
WC	(Mexico) LC Álvarez	3	6^{2}
(Portugal) G Oliveira	5	7^{8}	3
5	(Argentina) JI Londero	7	6^{6}	6
4	(Slovakia) A Martin	2	1
(Netherlands) J de Jong	6	6
(Argentina) R Olivo	6	4	7^{7}
Q	(United States) N Chappell	4	6	6^{2}
Q	(United States) K Smith	6	3	4
Alt	(Serbia) P Krstin	4	6	6
(Brazil) F Meligeni Alves	1	7^{7}	6
6	(United States) E Escobedo	6	6^{5}	2

Second round
(Argentina) JP Ficovich	4	1
(Switzerland) M-A Hüsler	6	6
(France) M Janvier	3	6	7^{7}
5	(Argentina) JI Londero	6	3	6^{5}
(Netherlands) J de Jong	0	6	3
(Argentina) R Olivo	6	2	6
Alt	(Serbia) P Krstin	1	4
(Brazil) F Meligeni Alves	6	6

Quarterfinals
(Switzerland) M-A Hüsler	6	6
(France) M Janvier	3	3
(Argentina) R Olivo	6^{5}	3
(Brazil) F Meligeni Alves	7^{7}	6

Semifinals
(Switzerland) M-A Hüsler	7^{7}	6
(Brazil) F Meligeni Alves	6^{5}	2

=== Bottom half ===
First round
7/WC	(Chile) N Jarry	4	7^{7}	6
Alt	(Norway) V Durasovic	6	6^{5}	2
(Brazil) M Pucinelli de Almeida	5	7^{7}	7^{8}
Alt	(Uzbekistan) D Istomin	7	6^{5}	6^{6}
(Argentina) F Mena	1	6	3
Q	(Colombia) N Barrientos	6	2	6
(Austria) G Melzer	6	0
3	(United States) S Kozlov	4	0^{r}
8	(United Kingdom) J Clarke	6	6^{3}	6
Alt	(Australia) B Tomic	4	7^{7}	3
(Italy) F Gaio	3	6	4
Q	(Brazil) M Alves	6	3	6
Q	(Germany) Elmar Ejupovic	6	6
WC	(Mexico) A Hernández	4	4
E Donskoy	3	2
2	(Argentina) TM Etcheverry	6	6

Second round
7/WC	(Chile) N Jarry	7^{7}	6
(Brazil) M Pucinelli de Almeida	6^{5}	2
Q	(Colombia) N Barrientos	1	1
(Austria) G Melzer	6	6
8	(United Kingdom) J Clarke	5	3
Q	(Brazil) M Alves	7	6
Q	(Germany) E Ejupovic	1	6^{2}
2	(Argentina) TM Etcheverry	6	7^{7}

Quarterfinals
7/WC	(Chile) N Jarry	7^{7}	7
(Austria) G Melzer	6^{4}	5
Q	(Brazil) M Alves	1	1
2	(Argentina) TM Etcheverry	6	6

Semifinals
7/WC	(Chile) N Jarry	6	5	6^{4}
2	(Argentina) TM Etcheverry	3	7	7^{7}
