= 2026 Los Cabos Open – Doubles =

Doubles
- 2026 Los Cabos Open

Final
- Champions: (United States) Ryan Seggerman (United States) Patrik Trhac
- Runners-up: (New Zealand) Finn Reynolds (New Zealand) James Watt
- Score: 7–6^{(7–4)}, 6–7^{(5–7)}, [10–8]

Details
- Draw: 16 (2WC)
- Seeds: 4

Events
Singles	Doubles
- Los Cabos Open

Ryan Seggerman and Patrik Trhac defeated Finn Reynolds and James Watt in the final, 7–6^{(7–4)}, 6–7^{(5–7)}, [10–8] to win the doubles tennis title at the 2026 Los Cabos Open. It was the first ATP Tour title for both players.

Robert Cash and JJ Tracy were the reigning champions, but chose to compete separately in Washington instead.

== Seeds ==
1. (United States) Rajeev Ram / (United Kingdom) Joe Salisbury (first round)
2. (Brazil) Orlando Luz / (Brazil) Rafael Matos (semifinals)
3. (United States) Robert Galloway / (United States) Evan King (first round)
4. (Netherlands) Jean-Julien Rojer / (United States) Theodore Winegar (first round)

== Draw ==
Key

- Q = Qualifier
- WC = Wild card
- LL = Lucky loser
- Alt = Alternate
- ITF = ITF entry
- PR = Protected ranking
- SR = Special ranking
- SE = Special exempt
- JE = Junior exempt
- JR = Junior Accelerator Programme entrant
- CO = College Accelerator Programme entrant
- NG = Next Gen Accelerator Program entrant
- w/o = Walkover
- r = Retired
- d = Defaulted

=== Draw ===
First round
1	(United States) R Ram (United Kingdom) J Salisbury	3	4
(Ecuador) G Escobar (India) N Kaliyanda Poonacha	6	6
WC	(Mexico) LC Álvarez (Mexico) A Magadán	w/o
Alt	(Czech Republic) D Svrčina (Australia) B Tomic
3	(United States) R Galloway (United States) E King	6	3	[8]
(New Zealand) F Reynolds (New Zealand) J Watt	4	6	[10]
(Australia) R Hijikata (United States) R Stalder	6	4	[10]
I Liutarevich (Mexico) MÁ Reyes-Varela	3	6	[8]
(United States) R Seggerman (United States) P Trhac	7	6
WC	(Mexico) A Hernández (Colombia) N Mejía	5	3
(Chinese Taipei) R Ho (United States) B Kittay	7^{7}	4	[10]
4	(Netherlands) J-J Rojer (United States) T Winegar	6^{5}	6	[5]
(South Korea) J-s Nam (Japan) T Yuzuki	3	4
(Thailand) P Isaro (United Kingdom) J Paris	6	6
(Mexico) S González (Mexico) R Pacheco Méndez	3	3
2	(Brazil) O Luz (Brazil) R Matos	6	6

Quarterfinals
(Ecuador) G Escobar (India) N Kaliyanda Poonacha	6	6
WC	(Mexico) LC Álvarez (Mexico) A Magadán	1	1
(New Zealand) F Reynolds (New Zealand) J Watt	6	6
(Australia) R Hijikata (United States) R Stalder	2	4
(United States) R Seggerman (United States) P Trhac	7^{7}	6
(Chinese Taipei) R Ho (United States) B Kittay	6^{5}	3
(Thailand) P Isaro (United Kingdom) J Paris	1	5
2	(Brazil) O Luz (Brazil) R Matos	6	7

Semifinals
(Ecuador) G Escobar (India) N Kaliyanda Poonacha	3	6^{3}
(New Zealand) F Reynolds (New Zealand) J Watt	6	7^{7}
(United States) R Seggerman (United States) P Trhac	7^{12}	7^{7}
2	(Brazil) O Luz (Brazil) R Matos	6^{10}	6^{3}

Final
(New Zealand) F Reynolds (New Zealand) J Watt	6^{4}	7^{7}	[8]
(United States) R Seggerman (United States) P Trhac	7^{7}	6^{5}	[10]
