= 2022 Mexico City Open =

- Date: 4–10 April
- Edition: 1st
- Surface: Clay
- Location: Mexico City, Mexico

Champions

Singles
- (Switzerland) Marc-Andrea Hüsler

Doubles
- (Chile) Nicolás Jarry / (Brazil) Matheus Pucinelli de Almeida
Mexico City Open	· 2023 →

The 2022 Mexico City Open was a professional tennis tournament played on clay courts. It was the first edition of the tournament which was part of the 2022 ATP Challenger Tour. It took place in Mexico City, Mexico between 4 and 10 April 2022.

== Singles main-draw entrants ==
=== Seeds ===
Country	Player	Rank^{1}	Seed
ARG	Facundo Bagnis	104	1
ARG	Tomás Martín Etcheverry	108	2
USA	Stefan Kozlov	120	3
SVK	Andrej Martin	128	4
ARG	Juan Ignacio Londero	130	5
USA	Ernesto Escobedo	133	6
CHI	Nicolás Jarry	142	7
GBR	Jay Clarke	168	8

- ^{1} Rankings are as of 21 March 2022.

=== Other entrants ===
The following players received wildcards into the singles main draw:

- (Mexico) Luis Carlos Álvarez
- (Mexico) Alex Hernández
- (Chile) Nicolás Jarry

The following players received entry into the singles main draw as alternates:

- (Norway) Viktor Durasovic
- (Uzbekistan) Denis Istomin
- (Serbia) Peđa Krstin
- (Australia) Bernard Tomic

The following players received entry from the qualifying draw:

- (Brazil) Mateus Alves
- (Colombia) Nicolás Barrientos
- (United States) Nick Chappell
- (Germany) Elmar Ejupovic
- (Brazil) Gilbert Klier Júnior
- (United States) Keegan Smith

== Champions ==
=== Singles ===
- (Switzerland) Marc-Andrea Hüsler def. (Argentina) Tomás Martín Etcheverry 6–4, 6–2.

=== Doubles ===
- (Chile) Nicolás Jarry / (Brazil) Matheus Pucinelli de Almeida def. (France) Jonathan Eysseric / (New Zealand) Artem Sitak 6–2, 6–3.
