= 2022 Mexico City Open – Doubles =

Doubles
- 2022 Mexico City Open

Final
- Champions: (Chile) Nicolás Jarry (Brazil) Matheus Pucinelli de Almeida
- Runners-up: (France) Jonathan Eysseric (New Zealand) Artem Sitak
- Score: 6–2, 6–3

Events
Singles	Doubles
- Mexico City Open

This was the first edition of the tournament.

Nicolás Jarry and Matheus Pucinelli de Almeida won the title after defeating Jonathan Eysseric and Artem Sitak 6–2, 6–3 in the final.

== Seeds ==
1. (Colombia) Nicolás Barrientos / (Mexico) Miguel Ángel Reyes-Varela (quarterfinals)
2. (Venezuela) Luis David Martínez / (Brazil) Felipe Meligeni Alves (first round)
3. (Slovakia) Andrej Martin / (Austria) Tristan-Samuel Weissborn (first round)
4. (Portugal) Gonçalo Oliveira / (India) Divij Sharan (first round)

== Draw ==
Key

- Q = Qualifier
- WC = Wild card
- LL = Lucky loser
- Alt = Alternate
- ITF = ITF entry
- PR = Protected ranking
- SR = Special ranking
- SE = Special exempt
- JE = Junior exempt
- JR = Junior Accelerator Programme entrant
- CO = College Accelerator Programme entrant
- NG = Next Gen Accelerator Program entrant
- w/o = Walkover
- r = Retired
- d = Defaulted

First round
1	(Colombia) N Barrientos (Mexico) MÁ Reyes-Varela	6	6
(United States) A Lawson (United States) R Stalder	4	4
E Donskoy (Kazakhstan) G Lomakin	6	6
(Argentina) JI Londero (Switzerland) J Paul	2	2
4	(Portugal) G Oliveira (India) D Sharan	7	5	[8]
Alt	(Brazil) M Alves (United States) E Escobedo	5	7	[10]
(Argentina) JP Ficovich (Argentina) F Mena	3	1
(Chile) N Jarry (Brazil) M Pucinelli de Almeida	6	6
(Switzerland) M-A Hüsler (United States) E King	6	6
(Netherlands) J de Jong (Netherlands) B Stevens	2	4
(France) J Eysseric (New Zealand) A Sitak	3	7^{8}	[14]
3	(Slovakia) A Martin (Austria) T-S Weissborn	6	6^{6}	[12]
(Bolivia) B Arias (Bolivia) F Zeballos	7^{7}	6
WC	(Mexico) M Sánchez (Australia) B Tomic	6^{0}	4
WC	(Spain) A Menéndez Maceiras (Mexico) L Patiño	3	6	[12]
2	(Venezuela) LD Martínez (Brazil) F Meligeni Alves	6	3	[10]

Quarterfinals
1	(Colombia) N Barrientos (Mexico) MÁ Reyes-Varela	6	4	[6]
E Donskoy (Kazakhstan) G Lomakin	1	6	[10]
Alt	(Brazil) M Alves (United States) E Escobedo	6^{3}	6^{2}
(Chile) N Jarry (Brazil) M Pucinelli de Almeida	7^{7}	7^{7}
(Switzerland) M-A Hüsler (United States) E King	3	6^{8}
(France) J Eysseric (New Zealand) A Sitak	6	7^{10}
(Bolivia) B Arias (Bolivia) F Zeballos	6	6
WC	(Spain) A Menéndez Maceiras (Mexico) L Patiño	4	2

Semifinals
E Donskoy (Kazakhstan) G Lomakin	3	4
(Chile) N Jarry (Brazil) M Pucinelli de Almeida	6	6
(France) J Eysseric (New Zealand) A Sitak	6	6^{8}	[10]
(Bolivia) B Arias (Bolivia) F Zeballos	4	7^{10}	[6]

Final
(Chile) N Jarry (Brazil) M Pucinelli de Almeida	6	6
(France) J Eysseric (New Zealand) A Sitak	2	3
