= 2025 Queensland International – Men's doubles =

Men's doubles
- 2025 Queensland International

Final
- Champions: (Australia) Matthew Romios (Northern Mariana Islands) Colin Sinclair
- Runners-up: (Australia) Joshua Charlton (Australia) Patrick Harper
- Score: 7–6^{(7–2)}, 7–5

Events
Singles	men	women
Doubles	men	women
- Queensland International

This was the first edition of the tournament.

Matthew Romios and Colin Sinclair won the title after defeating Joshua Charlton and Patrick Harper 7–6^{(7–2)}, 7–5 in the final.

== Seeds ==
1. (United Kingdom) Charles Broom / (India) Anirudh Chandrasekar (quarterfinals)
2. (Australia) Blake Ellis / (Australia) Adam Walton (semifinals)
3. (Australia) Joshua Charlton / (Australia) Patrick Harper (final)
4. (Australia) Matthew Romios / (Northern Mariana Islands) Colin Sinclair (champions)

== Draw ==
Key

- Q = Qualifier
- WC = Wild card
- LL = Lucky loser
- Alt = Alternate
- ITF = ITF entry
- PR = Protected ranking
- SR = Special ranking
- SE = Special exempt
- JE = Junior exempt
- JR = Junior Accelerator Programme entrant
- CO = College Accelerator Programme entrant
- NG = Next Gen Accelerator Program entrant
- w/o = Walkover
- r = Retired
- d = Defaulted

=== Draw ===
First round
1	(United Kingdom) C Broom (India) A Chandrasekar	6	6
WC	(Australia) H Jones (Australia) Pavle Marinkov	4	3
(Australia) M Bouzige (United States) Andre Ilagan	4	4
(United States) Christian Langmo (United States) G Nanda	6	6
3	(Australia) J Charlton (Australia) P Harper	4	6	[10]
(Australia) M Hulme (New Zealand) J Watt	6	4	[6]
(Australia) Je Delaney (Japan) M Imamura	6	6
Alt	(Japan) Hikaru Shiraishi (France) A Weber	2	2
(Czech Republic) M Gengel (France) M Janvier	1	6^{4}
(Australia) Ja Delaney (United Kingdom) M Whitehouse	6	7^{7}
(Japan) S Hazawa (Japan) Y Shimizu	4	6	[2]
4	(Australia) MC Romios (Northern Mariana Islands) C Sinclair	6	3	[10]
(Australia) K Pearson (United States) J Sheehy	6^{4}	6	[10]
(Australia) C Puttergill (Australia) D Sweeny	7^{7}	3	[8]
(Australia) B Bayldon (Netherlands) M Hermans	2	7^{7}	[7]
2/WC	(Australia) B Ellis (Australia) A Walton	6	6^{4}	[10]

Quarterfinals
1	(United Kingdom) C Broom (India) A Chandrasekar	6	3	[8]
(United States) C Langmo (United States) G Nanda	1	6	[10]
3	(Australia) J Charlton (Australia) P Harper	7	6
(Australia) Je Delaney (Japan) M Imamura	5	2
(Australia) Ja Delaney (United Kingdom) M Whitehouse	3	4
4	(Australia) MC Romios (Northern Mariana Islands) C Sinclair	6	6
(Australia) K Pearson (United States) J Sheehy	6^{6}	2
2/WC	(Australia) B Ellis (Australia) A Walton	7^{8}	6

Semifinals
(United States) C Langmo (United States) G Nanda	3	4
3	(Australia) J Charlton (Australia) P Harper	6	6
4	(Australia) MC Romios (Northern Mariana Islands) C Sinclair	7^{8}	7^{7}
2/WC	(Australia) B Ellis (Australia) A Walton	6^{6}	6^{4}

Final
3	(Australia) J Charlton (Australia) P Harper	6^{2}	5
4	(Australia) MC Romios (Northern Mariana Islands) C Sinclair	7^{7}	7
