= 2025 Croatia Open Umag – Singles =

Singles
- 2025 Croatia Open Umag

Final
- Champion: (Italy) Luciano Darderi
- Runner-up: (Spain) Carlos Taberner
- Score: 6−3, 6−3

Details
- Draw: 28 (4Q / 3WC)
- Seeds: 8

Events
Singles	Doubles
← 2024 ·	Croatia Open	· 2026 →

Luciano Darderi defeated Carlos Taberner in the final, 6–3, 6–3 to win the singles tennis title at the 2025 Croatia Open Umag. It was his fourth career ATP Tour title and his second consecutive title in as many weeks, having won the previous week in Båstad.

Francisco Cerúndolo was the defending champion, but lost in the second round to Taberner.

== Seeds ==
The top four seeds received a bye into the second round.

1. (Argentina) Francisco Cerúndolo (second round)
2. (Italy) Luciano Darderi (champion)
3. (Argentina) Camilo Ugo Carabelli (semifinals)
4. (Bosnia and Herzegovina) Damir Džumhur (semifinals)
5. (Argentina) Mariano Navone (second round)
6. (Spain) Roberto Carballés Baena (first round)
7. (Poland) Kamil Majchrzak (first round)
8. (Czech Republic) Vít Kopřiva (second round)

== Draw ==
=== Key ===
- Q = Qualifier
- WC = Wild card
- LL = Lucky loser
- Alt = Alternate
- ITF = ITF entry
- PR = Protected ranking
- SR = Special ranking
- SE = Special exempt
- JE = Junior exempt
- JR = Junior Accelerator Programme entrant
- CO = College Accelerator Programme entrant
- NG = Next Gen Accelerator Program entrant
- w/o = Walkover
- r = Retired
- d = Defaulted

=== Finals ===
Semifinals
(Spain) Carlos Taberner	6	6
4	(Bosnia and Herzegovina) Damir Džumhur	2	1
3	(Argentina) Camilo Ugo Carabelli	6^{6}	3
2	(Italy) Luciano Darderi	7^{8}	6

Final
(Spain) Carlos Taberner	3	3
2	(Italy) Luciano Darderi	6	6

=== Top half ===
First round
(Spain) C Taberner	6	7^{7}
(France) P-H Herbert	4	6^{1}
(Netherlands) J de Jong	6	6
WC	(Croatia) M Poljičak	3	3
(Chile) T Barrios Vera	1	2
5	(Argentina) M Navone	6	6
Q	(Ecuador) Á Guillén Meza	4	1
(Switzerland) S Wawrinka	6	6
Q	(France) T Droguet	6	6
(Chile) C Garín	3	3
(Belgium) R Collignon	6	4	3
8	(Czech Republic) V Kopřiva	3	6	6

Second round
1	(Argentina) F Cerúndolo	7^{7}	4	5
(Spain) C Taberner	6^{2}	6	7
(Netherlands) J de Jong	6	6
5	(Argentina) M Navone	3	4
4	(Bosnia and Herzegovina) D Džumhur	6	7
(Switzerland) S Wawrinka	4	5
Q	(France) T Droguet	6	6
8	(Czech Republic) V Kopřiva	2	3

Quarterfinals
(Spain) C Taberner	7	6
(Netherlands) J de Jong	5	3
4	(Bosnia and Herzegovina) D Džumhur	3	7	6
Q	(France) T Droguet	6	5	2

Semifinals
(Spain) C Taberner	6	6
4	(Bosnia and Herzegovina) D Džumhur	2	1

=== Bottom half ===
First round
7	(Poland) K Majchrzak	2	4
Q	(Spain) P Llamas Ruiz	6	6
(Serbia) D Lajović	3	4
(France) T Atmane	6	6
WC	(Croatia) M Dodig	6	1	2
(Italy) F Passaro	4	6	6
6	(Spain) R Carballés Baena	3	4
(Georgia (country)) N Basilashvili	6	6
WC	(Croatia) D Prižmić	6	6
(Denmark) E Møller	4	2
(Chinese Taipei) C-h Tseng	7	6
Q	(Italy) G Zeppieri	5	4

Second round
Q	(Spain) P Llamas Ruiz	6	6
(France) T Atmane	3	3
(Italy) F Passaro	7^{7}	2	3
3	(Argentina) C Ugo Carabelli	6^{5}	6	6
(Georgia (country)) N Basilashvili	6	3	2
WC	(Croatia) D Prižmić	2	6	6
(Chinese Taipei) C-h Tseng	5	0
2	(Italy) L Darderi	7	6

Quarterfinals
Q	(Spain) P Llamas Ruiz	4	2^{r}
3	(Argentina) C Ugo Carabelli	6	5
WC	(Croatia) D Prižmić	6	2	3
2	(Italy) L Darderi	1	6	6

Semifinals
3	(Argentina) C Ugo Carabelli	6^{6}	3
2	(Italy) L Darderi	7^{8}	6

== Qualifying ==
=== Seeds ===
1. (Italy) Andrea Pellegrino (qualifying competition)
2. (Lithuania) Vilius Gaubas (qualifying competition)
3. (Argentina) Marco Trungelliti (first round)
4. (Argentina) Federico Coria (first round)
5. (France) Kyrian Jacquet (first round)
6. (France) Ugo Blanchet (first round)
7. (France) Titouan Droguet (qualified)
8. (France) Luca Van Assche (qualifying competition)

=== Qualifiers ===
1. (Spain) Pablo Llamas Ruiz
2. (France) Titouan Droguet
3. (Ecuador) Álvaro Guillén Meza
4. (Italy) Giulio Zeppieri

=== Qualifying draw ===
==== First qualifier ====
First round
1	(Italy) Andrea Pellegrino	6	2	7^{7}
(Ukraine) Vitaliy Sachko	2	6	6^{1}
PR	(Spain) Pablo Llamas Ruiz	3	6	7^{7}
5	(France) Kyrian Jacquet	6	3	6^{2}

Qualifying competition
1	(Italy) Andrea Pellegrino	3	4
PR	(Spain) Pablo Llamas Ruiz	6	6

==== Second qualifier ====
First round
2	(Lithuania) Vilius Gaubas	6	6
(Italy) Federico Arnaboldi	3	2
WC	(Germany) Niels McDonald	4	3
7	(France) Titouan Droguet	6	6

Qualifying competition
2	(Lithuania) Vilius Gaubas	6	3	3
7	(France) Titouan Droguet	4	6	6

==== Third qualifier ====
First round
3	(Argentina) Marco Trungelliti	6^{2}	2
WC	(Croatia) Luka Mikrut	7^{7}	6
(Ecuador) Álvaro Guillén Meza	6	3	6
6	(France) Ugo Blanchet	4	6	2

Qualifying competition
WC	(Croatia) Luka Mikrut	3	1
(Ecuador) Álvaro Guillén Meza	6	6

==== Fourth qualifier ====
First round
4	(Argentina) Federico Coria	2	1
PR	(Italy) Giulio Zeppieri	6	6
Alt	(Italy) Marco Cecchinato	3	6^{3}
8	(France) Luca Van Assche	6	7^{7}

Qualifying competition
PR	(Italy) Giulio Zeppieri	6	6
8	(France) Luca Van Assche	3	4
