= 2025 Queensland International – Men's singles =

Men's singles
- 2025 Queensland International

Final
- Champion: (Australia) Tristan Schoolkate
- Runner-up: (Czech Republic) Marek Gengel
- Score: 7–6^{(7–3)}, 7–6^{(7–4)}

Events
Singles	men	women
Doubles	men	women
- Queensland International

This was the first edition of the tournament.

Tristan Schoolkate won the title after defeating Marek Gengel 7–6^{(7–3)}, 7–6^{(7–4)} in the final.

== Seeds ==
1. (Australia) Rinky Hijikata (second round)
2. (Australia) Adam Walton (semifinals)
3. (Australia) Li Tu (first round)
4. (Australia) Alex Bolt (quarterfinals)
5. (Australia) Tristan Schoolkate (champion)
6. (Australia) Omar Jasika (semifinals)
7. (Japan) Yuta Shimizu (second round)
8. (Australia) Bernard Tomic (quarterfinals)

== Draw ==
Key

- Q = Qualifier
- WC = Wild card
- LL = Lucky loser
- Alt = Alternate
- ITF = ITF entry
- PR = Protected ranking
- SR = Special ranking
- SE = Special exempt
- JE = Junior exempt
- JR = Junior Accelerator Programme entrant
- CO = College Accelerator Programme entrant
- NG = Next Gen Accelerator Program entrant
- w/o = Walkover
- r = Retired
- d = Defaulted

=== Finals ===
Semifinals
6	(Australia) Omar Jasika	6^{4}	3
(Czech Republic) Marek Gengel	7^{7}	6
5	(Australia) Tristan Schoolkate	4	6	7^{7}
2	(Australia) Adam Walton	6	3	6^{5}

Final
(Czech Republic) Marek Gengel	6^{3}	6^{4}
5	(Australia) Tristan Schoolkate	7^{7}	7^{7}

=== Top half ===
First round
1	(Australia) R Hijikata	6^{3}	6	6
WC	(Australia) H Jones	7^{7}	4	0
(Australia) J McCabe	6	7^{7}
(Australia) M Bouzige	1	6^{4}
(United States) Christian Langmo	6	6
Q	(Ukraine) I Marchenko	4	3
Q	(Australia) Jacob Bradshaw	3	1
6	(Australia) O Jasika	6	6
3	(Australia) L Tu	6^{3}	4
(Australia) B Ellis	7^{7}	6
Q	(United States) Jacob Brumm	3	6	2
WC	(Australia) Pavle Marinkov	6	4	6
(Czech Republic) M Gengel	6	6
(Japan) N Nakagawa	4	3
(Japan) M Imamura	4	4
7	(Japan) Y Shimizu	6	6

Second round
1	(Australia) R Hijikata	4	5
(Australia) J McCabe	6	7
(United States) C Langmo	5	5
6	(Australia) O Jasika	7	7
(Australia) B Ellis	6	7
WC	(Australia) P Marinkov	4	5
(Czech Republic) M Gengel	3	6	6
7	(Japan) Y Shimizu	6	4	0

Quarterfinals
(Australia) J McCabe	7^{9}	2	5
6	(Australia) O Jasika	6^{7}	6	7
(Australia) B Ellis	4	6	5
(Czech Republic) M Gengel	6	3	7

Semifinals
6	(Australia) O Jasika	6^{4}	3
(Czech Republic) M Gengel	7^{7}	6

=== Bottom half ===
First round
5	(Australia) T Schoolkate	7	6
(China) Y Zhou	5	3
(Australia) D Sweeny	3	3
(Australia) Matthew Dellavedova	6	6
(United States) G Nanda	1	7^{8}	7
(France) M Janvier	6	6^{6}	5
Q	(Australia) M Hulme	5	3
4	(Australia) A Bolt	7	6
8	(Australia) B Tomic	6	0	7^{7}
(United Kingdom) C Broom	1	6	6^{3}
(Japan) H Moriya	0	4
WC	(Australia) J Kubler	6	6
Q	(Japan) S Hazawa	6	1
Q	(Japan) K Isomura	4	0^{r}
(United States) Andre Ilagan	2	4
2	(Australia) A Walton	6	6

Second round
5	(Australia) T Schoolkate	6	7^{8}
(Australia) M Dellavedova	2	6^{6}
(United States) G Nanda	6	6^{8}	6^{4}
4	(Australia) A Bolt	4	7^{10}	7^{7}
8	(Australia) B Tomic	6	6^{6}	7^{7}
WC	(Australia) J Kubler	3	7^{8}	6^{3}
Q	(Japan) S Hazawa	4	3
2	(Australia) A Walton	6	6

Quarterfinals
5	(Australia) T Schoolkate	6	7
4	(Australia) A Bolt	3	5
8	(Australia) B Tomic	4	5
2	(Australia) A Walton	6	7

Semifinals
5	(Australia) T Schoolkate	4	6	7^{7}
2	(Australia) A Walton	6	3	6^{5}
