= 2025 Serve First Open =

- Date: 12–17 August
- Edition: 1st
- Surface: Hard
- Location: Sumter, South Carolina, United States

Champions

Singles
- (Italy) Mattia Bellucci

Doubles
- (United States) Ryan Seggerman / (United States) Patrik Trhac
- Serve First Open

The 2025 Serve First Open was a professional tennis tournament played on hardcourts. It was the first edition of the tournament which was part of the 2025 ATP Challenger Tour. It took place in Sumter, South Carolina, United States between 12 and 17 August 2025.

== Singles main draw entrants ==
=== Seeds ===
Country	Player	Rank^{1}	Seed
BEL	Zizou Bergs	54	1
~~JPN~~	~~Kei Nishikori~~	~~65~~	~~2~~
ITA	Mattia Bellucci	74	3
AUT	Filip Misolic	96	4
KAZ	Alexander Shevchenko	102	5
GEO	Nikoloz Basilashvili	112	6
JPN	Shintaro Mochizuki	120	7
SVK	Lukáš Klein	122	8
POR	Jaime Faria	124	9

- ^{1} Rankings as of 4 August 2025.

=== Other entrants ===
The following players received wildcards into the singles main draw:

- (United States) Kaylan Bigun
- (United States) Darwin Blanch
- (United States) Alex Rybakov

The following players received entry into the singles main draw as alternates:

- (United States) Murphy Cassone
- (Estonia) Mark Lajal
- (Portugal) Henrique Rocha
- (Japan) Rei Sakamoto
- (Japan) Sho Shimabukuro
- (Japan) James Trotter

The following players received entry from the qualifying draw:

- (United States) Martin Damm
- (United Kingdom) Jacob Fearnley
- (Croatia) ~~Borna Gojo~~
- (United States) Ryan Seggerman

The following players received entry as lucky losers:

- (United States) Strong Kirchheimer
- (United States) Karl Poling

== Champions ==
=== Singles ===
- (Italy) Mattia Bellucci def. (Kazakhstan) Alexander Shevchenko 7–6^{(7–5)}, 3–1 ret.

=== Doubles ===
- (United States) Ryan Seggerman / (United States) Patrik Trhac def. (India) Sriram Balaji / (India) Rithvik Choudary Bollipalli 6–4, 7–6^{(7–3)}.
