= 2026 Los Cabos Open – Singles =

Singles
- 2026 Los Cabos Open

Final
- Champion: (France) Arthur Géa
- Runner-up: (Canada) Denis Shapovalov
- Score: 6–3, 6–4

Details
- Draw: 28 (4Q / 3WC )
- Seeds: 8

Events
| Singles | Doubles |
- Los Cabos Open

Arthur Géa defeated defending champion Denis Shapovalov in the final, 6–3, 6–4 to win the singles tennis title at the 2026 Los Cabos Open. It was his first ATP Tour title, making him the youngest winner in Los Cabos Open history and the sixth ATP Tour champion born in 2005 or later.

== Seeds ==
The top four seeds received a bye into the second round.

1. (Czech Republic) Jiří Lehečka (second round)
2. (Italy) Luciano Darderi (second round, retired)
3. (Argentina) Francisco Cerúndolo (quarterfinals)
4. Karen Khachanov (second round)
5. (United Kingdom) Cameron Norrie (semifinals)
6. (France) Corentin Moutet (first round)
7. (Spain) Martín Landaluce (first round)
8. (Canada) Denis Shapovalov (final)

== Draw ==
Key

- Q = Qualifier
- WC = Wild card
- LL = Lucky loser
- Alt = Alternate
- ITF = ITF entry
- PR = Protected ranking
- SR = Special ranking
- SE = Special exempt
- JE = Junior exempt
- JR = Junior Accelerator Programme entrant
- CO = College Accelerator Programme entrant
- NG = Next Gen Accelerator Program entrant
- w/o = Walkover
- r = Retired
- d = Defaulted

=== Finals ===
Semifinals
(Hong Kong) Coleman Wong | 6^{7} | 3
(France) Arthur Géa | 7^{9} | 6
5 | (United Kingdom) Cameron Norrie | 3 | 7 | 4
8 | (Canada) Denis Shapovalov | 6 | 5 | 6

Final
(France) Arthur Géa | 6 | 6
8 | (Canada) Denis Shapovalov | 3 | 4

=== Top half ===
First round
(Hong Kong) C Wong | 6 | 6
NG | (United States) Dar Blanch | 3 | 4
WC | (France) M Kouamé | 1 | 4
LL | (Australia) E Winter | 6 | 6
(United States) J Brooksby | 6 | 6
6 | (France) C Moutet | 4 | 4
(Canada) G Diallo | 5 | 2
Q | (United States) T Boyer | 7 | 6
Q | (South Korea) S-w Kwon | 4 | 7^{10} | 2
(France) A Géa | 6 | 6^{8} | 6
(United States) M Zheng | 6 | 6
7 | (Spain) M Landaluce | 4 | 3

Second round
1 | (Czech Republic) J Lehečka | 6 | 3 | 4
(Hong Kong) C Wong | 1 | 6 | 6
LL | (Australia) E Winter | 3 | 4
(United States) J Brooksby | 6 | 6
3 | (Argentina) F Cerúndolo | 6^{4} | 4
Q | (United States) T Boyer | 7^{7} | 3^{r}
(France) A Géa | 0 | 6 | 6
(United States) M Zheng | 6 | 4 | 0

Quarterfinals
(Hong Kong) C Wong | 6 | 7
(United States) J Brooksby | 1 | 5
3 | (Argentina) F Cerúndolo | 7^{13} | 4 | 0
(France) A Géa | 6^{11} | 6 | 6

Semifinals
(Hong Kong) C Wong | 6^{7} | 3
(France) A Géa | 7^{9} | 6

=== Bottom half ===
First round
5 | (United Kingdom) C Norrie | 6 | 6
(United States) A Kovacevic | 4 | 1
Q | (United States) A Mayo | 6 | 3 | 4
(Australia) J Duckworth | 4 | 6 | 6
Q | (Mexico) A Hernández | 1 | 0
LL | (Australia) B Tomic | 6 | 6
8 | (Canada) D Shapovalov | 2 | 6 | 6
(Australia) R Hijikata | 6 | 3 | 2
(Japan) S Shimabukuro | 7^{7} | 5 | 2
WC | (Mexico) R Pacheco Méndez | 6^{4} | 7 | 6
(Czech Republic) D Svrčina | 6^{2} | 7^{7} | 6
(Australia) A Walton | 7^{7} | 6^{2} | 3

Second round
5 | (United Kingdom) C Norrie | 6 | 6
(Australia) J Duckworth | 4 | 4
LL | (Australia) B Tomic | 6 | 6
4 | K Khachanov | 2 | 4
8 | (Canada) D Shapovalov | 6 | 6
WC | (Mexico) R Pacheco Méndez | 3 | 2
(Czech Republic) D Svrčina | 3
2 | (Italy) L Darderi | 0^{r}

Quarterfinals
5 | (United Kingdom) C Norrie | 6 | 6
LL | (Australia) B Tomic | 1 | 0
8 | (Canada) D Shapovalov | 6 | 6
(Czech Republic) D Svrčina | 4 | 2

Semifinals
5 | (United Kingdom) C Norrie | 3 | 7 | 4
8 | (Canada) D Shapovalov | 6 | 5 | 6

== Qualifying ==
=== Seeds ===
1. (Colombia) Nicolás Mejía (first round)
2. (South Korea) Kwon Soon-woo (qualified)
3. (United States) Tristan Boyer (qualified)
4. (Croatia) Borna Gojo (withdrew)
5. (Australia) Bernard Tomic (qualifying competition, withdrew, lucky loser)
6. (United States) Colton Smith (first round)
7. (United States) Garrett Johns (first round)
8. (Australia) Edward Winter (qualifying competition, lucky loser)

=== Qualifiers ===
1. (Mexico) Alex Hernández
2. (South Korea) Kwon Soon-woo
3. (United States) Tristan Boyer
4. (United States) Aidan Mayo

=== Lucky losers ===
1. (Australia) Bernard Tomic
2. (Australia) Edward Winter

=== Qualifying draw ===
==== First qualifier ====
First round
1 | (Colombia) Nicolás Mejía | 5 | 2
(Mexico) Alex Hernández | 7 | 6
Alt | (Mexico) Alan Magadán | 2 | 6 | 6
7 | (United States) Garrett Johns | 6 | 1 | 1

Qualifying competition
(Mexico) Alex Hernández | 6 | 7^{8}
Alt | (Mexico) Alan Magadán | 3 | 6^{6}

==== Second qualifier ====
First round
2 | (South Korea) Kwon Soon-woo | 6 | 6
WC | (Mexico) Alan Fernando Rubio Fierros | 3 | 4
Alt | (Mexico) Luis Carlos Álvarez | 6 | 4 | 2
8 | (Australia) Edward Winter | 3 | 6 | 6

Qualifying competition
2 | (South Korea) Kwon Soon-woo | 7 | 6
8 | (Australia) Edward Winter | 5 | 2

==== Third qualifier ====
First round
3 | (United States) Tristan Boyer | 7^{7} | 6
Alt | (Italy) Lorenzo Claverie | 6^{1} | 3
(Colombia) Miguel Tobón | 7 | 4 | 6^{5}
5 | (Australia) Bernard Tomic | 5 | 6 | 7^{7}

Qualifying competition
3 | (United States) Tristan Boyer | w/o
5 | (Australia) Bernard Tomic

==== Fourth qualifier ====
First round
Alt | (United States) Evan King | 4 | 2
PR | (United States) Aidan Mayo | 6 | 6
WC | (Spain) Roger Pascual Ferrà | 4 | 6 | 6
6 | (United States) Colton Smith | 6 | 2 | 4

Qualifying competition
PR | (United States) Aidan Mayo | 6 | 6
WC | (Spain) Roger Pascual Ferrà | 1 | 4
