= 2024 Mexico City Open – Doubles =

Doubles
- 2024 Mexico City Open

Final
- Champions: (United States) Ryan Seggerman (United States) Patrik Trhac
- Runners-up: (Australia) Tristan Schoolkate (Australia) Adam Walton
- Score: 5–7, 6–4, [10–5]

Events
Singles	Doubles
- Mexico City Open

Boris Arias and Federico Zeballos were the defending champions but chose not to defend their title.

Ryan Seggerman and Patrik Trhac won the title after defeating Tristan Schoolkate and Adam Walton 5–7, 6–4, [10–5] in the final.

== Seeds ==
1. (United Kingdom) Luke Johnson / (Tunisia) Skander Mansouri (semifinals)
2. (United States) Christian Harrison / (United Kingdom) Marcus Willis (semifinals)
3. (India) Rithvik Choudary Bollipalli / (India) Niki Kaliyanda Poonacha (quarterfinals)
4. (Australia) Tristan Schoolkate / (Australia) Adam Walton (final)

== Draw ==
Key

- Q = Qualifier
- WC = Wild card
- LL = Lucky loser
- Alt = Alternate
- ITF = ITF entry
- PR = Protected ranking
- SR = Special ranking
- SE = Special exempt
- JE = Junior exempt
- JR = Junior Accelerator Programme entrant
- CO = College Accelerator Programme entrant
- NG = Next Gen Accelerator Program entrant
- w/o = Walkover
- r = Retired
- d = Defaulted

=== Draw ===
First round
1	(United Kingdom) L Johnson (Tunisia) S Mansouri	6	6
(France) G Mpetshi Perricard (France) L Sanchez	3	4
WC	(Colombia) N Mejía (Argentina) TA Tirante	6	7^{7}
(United States) G Goldhoff (Japan) J Trotter	4	6^{1}
3	(India) RC Bollipalli (India) N Kaliyanda Poonacha	6	7^{7}
(Italy) F Gaio (Italy) A Giannessi	3	6^{5}
(United States) R Seggerman (United States) P Trhac	7	6
(Australia) M Polmans (Australia) C Puttergill	5	4
WC	(Mexico) H Hach Verdugo (Canada) V Pospisil	2	4
(United States) M Kiger (Chile) M Soto	6	6
(Portugal) G Oliveira (United Kingdom) J Paris	7^{12}	4	[8]
4	(Australia) T Schoolkate (Australia) A Walton	6^{10}	6	[10]
(Australia) T Fancutt (United States) H Reese	6	6
(Australia) O Jasika (Austria) D Pichler	4	1
(Zimbabwe) B Lock (New Zealand) R Statham	1	2
2	(United States) C Harrison (United Kingdom) M Willis	6	6

Quarterfinals
1	(United Kingdom) L Johnson (Tunisia) S Mansouri	w/o
WC	(Colombia) N Mejía (Argentina) TA Tirante
3	(India) RC Bollipalli (India) N Kaliyanda Poonacha	4	6^{3}
(United States) R Seggerman (United States) P Trhac	6	7^{7}
(United States) M Kiger (Chile) M Soto	4	6	[10]
4	(Australia) T Schoolkate (Australia) A Walton	6	3	[12]
(Australia) T Fancutt (United States) H Reese	3	4
2	(United States) C Harrison (United Kingdom) M Willis	6	6

Semifinals
1	(United Kingdom) L Johnson (Tunisia) S Mansouri	4	4
(United States) R Seggerman (United States) P Trhac	6	6
4	(Australia) T Schoolkate (Australia) A Walton	6	7^{12}
2	(United States) C Harrison (United Kingdom) M Willis	3	6^{10}

Final
(United States) R Seggerman (United States) P Trhac	5	6	[10]
4	(Australia) T Schoolkate (Australia) A Walton	7	4	[5]
