= Serve First Open =

- 2025 Serve First Open

ATP Challenger Tour
- Location: Sumter, South Carolina, United States
- Category: ATP Challenger Tour 125
- Surface: Hard
- Website: website

The Serve First Open is a professional tennis tournament played on hardcourts. It is currently part of the ATP Challenger Tour. It was first held in Sumter, South Carolina, United States in 2025.

== Past finals ==
=== Singles ===
Year	Champion	Runner-up	Score
2025	(Italy) Mattia Bellucci	(Kazakhstan) Alexander Shevchenko	7–6^{(7–5)}, 3–1 ret.

=== Doubles ===
Year	Champions	Runners-up	Score
2025	(United States) Ryan Seggerman (United States) Patrik Trhac	(India) Sriram Balaji (India) Rithvik Choudary Bollipalli	6–4, 7–6^{(7–3)}
