= Tristan Schoolkate =

Australian tennis player (born 2001)

- Schoolkate at the 2026 Wimbledon Championships
- Country (sports): Australia
- Residence: Perth, Australia
- Born: 26 February 2001 (age 25) Perth, Australia
- Height: 1.83 m (6 ft 0 in)
- Plays: Right-handed (two-handed backhand)
- Coach: Andrew Roberts, Gavin Van Peperzeel
- Prize money: US $1,787,181

Singles
- Career record: 7–17
- Career titles: 0
- Highest ranking: No. 95 (15 September 2025)
- Current ranking: No. 153 (28 September 2026)

Grand Slam singles results
- Australian Open: 2R (2025)
- French Open: 1R (2025)
- Wimbledon: Q3 (2026)
- US Open: 2R (2024, 2025, 2026)

Doubles
- Career record: 6–9
- Career titles: 0
- Highest ranking: No. 120 (27 January 2025)
- Current ranking: No. 455 (28 September 2026)

Grand Slam doubles results
- Australian Open: 2R (2022, 2025)
- Last updated on: 28 September 2026.

Tristan Schoolkate (born 26 February 2001) is an Australian professional tennis player. He has a career high ATP singles ranking of world No. 95 achieved on 15 September 2025 and a doubles ranking of No. 120 achieved on 27 January 2025.

== Personal life ==
Schoolkate began playing tennis at age four and was initially coached by his father, who was a tennis coach at Claremont Lawn Tennis Club. His grandparents are from the Netherlands.

In August 2015, he represented Australia at the ITF World Junior Tennis Finals in Prostejov, Czech Republic.

== Career ==
=== 2019–2020: Beginnings and first ITF titles ===
Schoolkate made his ITF Men's World Tennis Tour main draw debut in Darwin in September 2019 and his ATP Challenger Tour main draw debut in October 2019 in Traralgon.

=== 2021: ATP Tour debut ===
In January 2021, Schoolkate made the second round of the 2021 Australian Open – Men's singles qualifying, losing to Bernard Tomic. He made his ATP Tour debut at the 2021 Great Ocean Road Open after receiving a wildcard into the main draw. He lost in straight sets to Botic van de Zandschulp.

In September 2021, Schoolkate won his first ITF singles title in Plaisir, France. In October 2021, he won his first ITF doubles title.

=== 2022–2023 ===
Schoolkate lost in the first qualifying round at the 2022 Australian Open. In April 2022, he achieved a new career-high ranking of No. 504, after reaching the final at the ITF M25 Canberra tournament.

=== 2024: First Challenger title, Major debut & first wins, top 150 ===
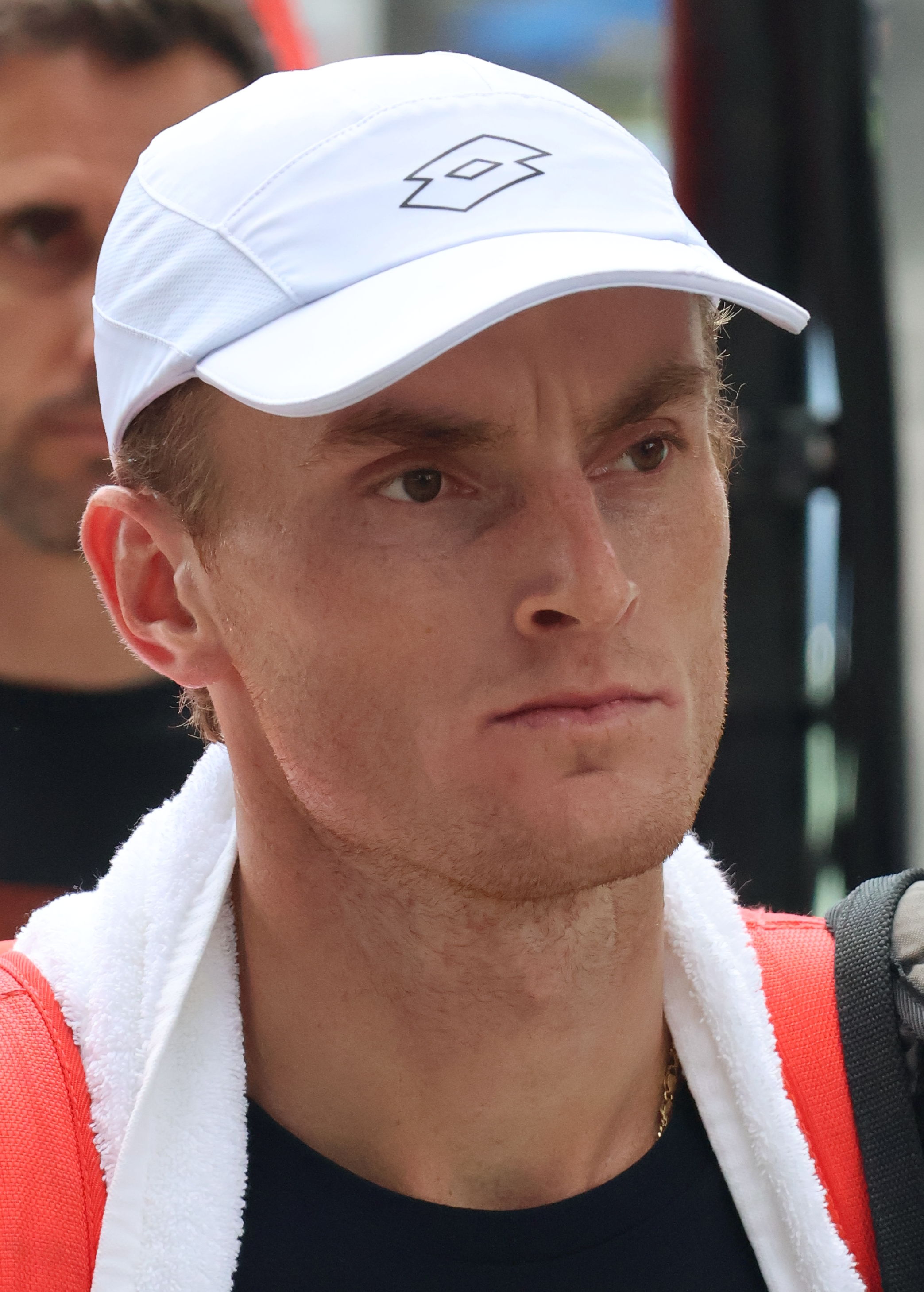
Schoolkate at the 2024 Washington Open

Ranked No. 241 at the 2024 Guangzhou International, Schoolkate defeated compatriot and third seed Adam Walton to lift his first Challenger singles trophy. At the same tournament he won the doubles title with Blake Ellis. As a result he reached the top 200 in the rankings at world No. 187 on 6 May 2024. At the 2024 Winston-Salem Open, he qualified for the main draw, but lost in the first round to fellow qualifier Learner Tien.

Ranked No. 193, for his Grand Slam debut, he received a wildcard for the 2024 US Open and defeated Taro Daniel in five sets, recording his first Major win. He lost to Jakub Menšík in the second round in a match which went to a fifth set tiebreak.

=== 2025: First quarterfinal, first doubles final, top 100 ===
Schoolkate received a main draw wildcard for the Australian Open for his debut at his home Slam and again defeated Taro Daniel, this time in four sets. He lost in the second round to world No. 1 and defending champion Jannik Sinner also in four sets. As a result he reached the top 150 at a new career-high of world No. 146 on 27 January 2025.

Schoolkate won his second Challenger title at the Queensland International, defeating Marek Gengel in the final in straight sets.

He was given a wildcard into the main-draw at the French Open, but lost to Márton Fucsovics in the first round.

Seeded seventh, Schoolkate won his third Challenger title at the Ilkley Open, defeating wildcard entrant Jack Pinnington Jones in the final.

In July, Schoolkate reached his first ATP Tour quarterfinal at the Los Cabos Open, defeating fifth seed Daniel Altmaier in the second round. He lost to third seed Denis Shapovalov in the quarterfinal. He also reached the final of the doubles tournament, the first of his career, pairing with Blake Bayldon. Later that month, Schoolkate won his second Masters 1000 match at the Canadian Open by defeating João Fonseca in the first round, thus registering his first top 50 win. He lost to 32nd seed Matteo Arnaldi in the second round.

== Performance timelines ==
Key
W	F	SF	QF	#R	RR	Q#	P#	DNQ	A	Z#	PO	G	S	B	NMS	NTI	P	NH

(W) winner; (F) finalist; (SF) semifinalist; (QF) quarterfinalist; (#R) rounds 4, 3, 2, 1; (RR) round-robin stage; (Q#) qualification round; (P#) preliminary round; (DNQ) did not qualify; (A) absent; (Z#) Davis/Fed Cup Zonal Group (with number indication) or (PO) play-off; (G) gold, (S) silver or (B) bronze Olympic/Paralympic medal; (NMS) not a Masters tournament; (NTI) not a Tier I tournament; (P) postponed; (NH) not held; (SR) strike rate (events won / competed); (W–L) win–loss record.
To avoid confusion and double counting, these charts are updated at the conclusion of a tournament or when the player's participation has ended.

Only main-draw results in ATP Tour, Grand Slam tournaments, Davis Cup and Olympic Games are included in win–loss records.

=== Singles ===
Current through the 2026 US Open.

Tournament	2020	2021	2022	2023	2024	2025	2026	SR	W–L	Win %
Grand Slam tournaments
Australian Open	Q1	Q2	Q1	Q3	Q2	2R	1R	0 / 2	1–2	33%
French Open	A	A	A	A	A	1R	Q2	0 / 1	0–1	0%
Wimbledon	NH	A	A	A	Q1	Q2	Q3	0 / 0	0–0	–
US Open	A	A	A	A	2R	2R	2R	0 / 3	3–3	50%
Win–loss	0–0	0–0	0–0	0–0	1–1	2–3	1–2	0 / 3	4–6	40%
ATP Masters 1000
Indian Wells Masters	NH	A	A	A	A	Q1	1R	0 / 1	0–1	0%
Miami Open	NH	A	A	A	A	2R	Q1	0 / 1	1–1	50%
Monte Carlo Masters	NH	A	A	A	A	A	A	0 / 0	0–0	–
Madrid Open	NH	A	A	A	A	A	A	0 / 0	0-0	–
Italian Open	A	A	A	A	A	A	A	0 / 0	0–0	–
Canadian Open	NH	A	A	A	A	2R	A	0 / 1	1–1	50%
Cincinnati Masters	A	A	A	A	A	Q1	A	0 / 0	0–0	–
Shanghai Masters	NH			A	A	1R		0 / 1	0–1	0%
Paris Masters	A	A	A	A	A	A		0 / 0	0–0	–
Win–loss	0–0	0–0	0–0	0–0	0–0	2–3	0–1	0 / 4	2–4	33%
Career statistics
Tournaments	0	1	0	0	3	9	5	Career total: 18		
Titles	0	0	0	0	0	0	0	Career total: 0		
Finals	0	0	0	0	0	0	0	Career total: 0		
Overall win–loss	0–0	0–1	0–0	0–0	1–3	6–9	1–5	0 / 18	8–18	31%
Year-end ranking	839	623	367	260	168	100		$1,787,181		

=== Doubles ===
Current after the 2026 US Open.

Tournament	2021	2022	2023	2024	2025	2026	SR	W–L	Win %
Grand Slam tournaments
Australian Open	A	2R	A	1R	2R	1R	0 / 4	2–4	33%
French Open	A	A	A	A	A	A	0 / 0	0–0	–
Wimbledon	A	A	A	A	A	A	0 / 0	0–0	–
US Open	A	A	A	A	A	A	0 / 0	0–0	–
Win–loss	0–0	1–1	0–0	0–1	1–1	0–1	0 / 4	2–4	33%
Career statistics
Tournaments	1	1	0	2	4	2	Career total: 10		
Titles	0	0	0	0	0	0	Career total: 0		
Finals	0	0	0	0	0	0	Career total: 0		
Overall win–loss	0–1	1–1	0–0	1–1	4–4	0–2	0 / 10	6–10	38%
Year-end ranking	494	210	159	136	202				

== ATP career finals ==
=== Doubles: 1 (1 runner-up) ===
Legend Grand Slams (0–0) ATP Finals (0–0) ATP Masters 1000 (0–0) ATP 500 (0–0) ATP 250 (0–1)	Titles by surface Hard (0–1) Clay (0–0) Grass (0–0)

Result	W–L	Date	Tournament	Tier	Surface	Partner	Opponents	Score
Loss	0–1	Jul 2025	Los Cabos Open, Mexico	ATP 250	Hard	(Australia) Blake Bayldon	(United States) Robert Cash (United States) JJ Tracy	6–7^{(4–7)}, 4–6

== ATP Challenger and ITF Tour finals ==
=== Singles: 11 (6 titles, 5 runner-ups) ===
Legend (singles) ATP Challenger Tour (4–2) Futures/ITF World Tennis Tour (2–3)	Finals by surface Hard (4–3) Clay (0–2) Grass (2–0)

Result	W–L	Date	Tournament	Tier	Surface	Opponent	Score
Win	1–0	Sep 2021	M25+H Plaisir, France	World Tennis Tour	Hard (i)	(France) Alexandre Reco	6–4, 7–5
Loss	1–1	Mar 2022	M25 Canberra, Australia	World Tennis Tour	Clay	(Australia) Jason Kubler	6–7^{(3–7)}, 1–6
Loss	1–2	May 2022	M15 Cairo, Egypt	World Tennis Tour	Clay	(Argentina) Ignacio Monzon	1–6, 1–6
Loss	1–3	Nov 2022	M25 Traralgon, Australia	World Tennis Tour	Hard	(Australia) Edward Winter	4–6, 2–6
Win	2–3	Feb 2023	M25 Swan Hill, Australia	World Tennis Tour	Grass	(Australia) Philip Sekulic	4–6, 6–4, 6–3
Win	3–3	May 2024	Guangzhou, China	Challenger	Hard	(Australia) Adam Walton	6–3, 3–6, 6–3
Win	4–3	Feb 2025	Brisbane, Australia	Challenger	Hard	(Czech Republic) Marek Gengel	7–6^{(7–3)}, 7–6^{(7–4)}
Loss	4–4	Apr 2025	Guangzhou, China	Challenger	Hard	(France) Térence Atmane	3–6, 6–7^{(4–7)}
Win	5–4	June 2025	Ilkley, UK	Challenger	Grass	(United Kingdom) Jack Pinnington Jones	6–7^{(8–10)}, 6–4, 6–3
Loss	5–5	Feb 2026	Brisbane, Australia	Challenger	Hard	(Australia) Dane Sweeny	6–3, 6–7^{(5–7)}, 6–7^{(4–7)}
Win	6–5	Oct 2026	Guangzhou, China	Challenger	Hard	(Hong Kong) Coleman Wong	4–6, 7–6^{(7–3)}, 6–4

=== Doubles: 22 (14 titles, 8 runner-ups) ===
Legend (doubles) ATP Challenger Tour (7–5) Futures/ITF World Tennis Tour (7–3)	Finals by surface Hard (11–7) Clay (2–1) Grass (1–0)

Result	W–L	Date	Tournament	Tier	Surface	Partner	Opponents	Score
Win	1–0	Oct 2021	M25 Nevers, France	World Tennis Tour	Hard (i)	(Australia) Blake Ellis	(United Kingdom) Millen Hurrion (United Kingdom) Ben Jones	5–7, 7–6^{(7–5)}, [10–8]
Win	2–0	Oct 2021	M25 Sarreguemines, France	World Tennis Tour	Hard (i)	(Australia) Blake Ellis	(France) Constantin Bittoun Kouzmine (Germany) Hendrik Jebens	7–6^{(7–5)}, 3–6, [10–5]
Loss	2–1	Nov 2021	M25 Saint-Dizier, France	World Tennis Tour	Hard (i)	(Australia) Blake Ellis	(Bulgaria) Alexander Donski (Greece) Petros Tsitsipas	4–6, 6–4 [7–10]
Loss	2–2	Nov 2021	M25 Villers-lès-Nancy, France	World Tennis Tour	Hard (i)	(Australia) Blake Ellis	(Bulgaria) Alexander Donski (Greece) Petros Tsitsipas	6–7, 2–3 (ret.)
Loss	2–3	Feb 2022	M25 Bendigo, Australia	World Tennis Tour	Hard	(Australia) Blake Ellis	(Australia) Calum Puttergill (Australia) Brandon Walkin	2–6, 3–6
Win	3–3	May 2022	M15 Cairo, Egypt	World Tennis Tour	Clay	(Northern Mariana Islands) Colin Sinclair	(Austria) David Pichler (Ukraine) Volodymyr Uzhylovskyi	6–1, 7–5
Win	4–3	Oct 2022	M25 Cairns, Australia	World Tennis Tour	Hard	(Australia) Blake Ellis	(Australia) Aaron Addison (Australia) Calum Puttergill	6–4, 6–1
Win	5–3	Oct 2022	Sydney, Australia	Challenger	Hard	(Australia) Blake Ellis	(New Zealand) Ajeet Rai (Japan) Yuta Shimizu	4–6, 7–5, [11–9]
Loss	5–4	Feb 2023	Burnie, Australia	Challenger	Hard	(Australia) Luke Saville	(Australia) Marc Polmans (Australia) Max Purcell	6–7^{(4–7)}, 4–6
Win	6–4	Feb 2023	M25 Burnie, Australia	World Tennis Tour	Hard	(Australia) Luke Saville	(Australia) Calum Puttergill (Australia) Adam Walton	7–5, 6–4
Win	7–4	Feb 2023	M25 Swan Hill, Australia	World Tennis Tour	Grass	(Australia) Luke Saville	(Australia) Blake Bayldon (Australia) Edward Winter	6–3, 7–6^{(7–3)}
Win	8–4	Feb 2023	M25 Swan Hill, Australia	World Tennis Tour	Hard	(Australia) Luke Saville	(Australia) Blake Ellis (Australia) Matthew Christopher Romios	6–3, 6–4
Win	9–4	Jul 2023	Bloomfield Hills, United States	Challenger	Hard	(Australia) Adam Walton	(Australia) Blake Ellis (Australia) Calum Puttergill	7–5, 6–3
Loss	9–5	Jul 2023	Granby, Canada	Challenger	Hard	(Australia) Adam Walton	(United States) Christian Harrison (Latvia) Mikelis Libietis	4–6, 3–6
Loss	9–6	Oct 2023	Playford, Australia	Challenger	Hard	(Australia) Blake Ellis	(United States) Ryan Seggerman (United States) Patrik Trhac	3–6, 6–7^{(3–7)}
Loss	9–7	Feb 2024	Burnie, Australia	Challenger	Hard	(Australia) Adam Walton	(Australia) Alex Bolt (Australia) Luke Saville	7–5, 3–6, [10–12]
Win	10–7	Feb 2024	Pune, India	Challenger	Hard	(Australia) Adam Walton	(France) Dan Added (South Korea) Chung Yun-seong	7–6^{(7–4)}, 7–5
Loss	10–8	Mar 2024	Mexico City, Mexico	Challenger	Clay	(Australia) Adam Walton	(United States) Ryan Seggerman (United States) Patrik Trhac	7–5, 4–6, [5–10]
Win	11–8	May 2024	Guangzhou, China	Challenger	Hard	(Australia) Blake Ellis	(South Korea) Nam Ji-sung (Finland) Patrik Niklas-Salminen	6–2, 6–7^{(4–7)}, [10–4]
Win	12–8	Sep 2024	Charleston, United States	Challenger	Hard	(Australia) Luke Saville	(Australia) Calum Puttergill (Australia) Dane Sweeny	6–7^{(3–7)}, 6–1, [10–3]
Win	13–8	Sep 2024	Tiburon, United States	Challenger	Hard	(Australia) Luke Saville	(United States) Patrick Kypson (United States) Eliot Spizzirri	6–4, 6–2
Win	14–8	Mar 2026	San Luis Potosí, Mexico	Challenger	Clay	(Australia) Jake Delaney	(Argentina) Facundo Mena (Mexico) Rodrigo Pacheco Méndez	6–4, 7–6^{(7–2)}
