= Patrik Trhac =

American tennis player (born 1998)

- Country (sports): United States
- Born: 31 October 1998 (age 27) San Diego, United States
- Height: 6 ft 6 in (1.98 m)
- Plays: Right-handed (two-handed backhand)
- College: Idaho State; Utah
- Prize money: US $325,478

Singles
- Career record: 0–0
- Career titles: 0
- Highest ranking: No. 1,485 (August 18, 2025)

Doubles
- Career record: 20–23
- Career titles: 1
- Highest ranking: No. 60 (September 14, 2026)
- Current ranking: No. 60 (September 14, 2026)

Grand Slam doubles results
- Australian Open: 1R (2026)
- French Open: 2R (2026)
- Wimbledon: 2R (2025, 2026)
- US Open: 2R (2026)
- Last updated on: September 14, 2026.

Patrik Trhac (Note: Czech: Trháč) (born October 31, 1998) is an American tennis player. He has a career-high ATP doubles ranking of world No. 60 achieved on September 14, 2026.

== College career ==
Trhac played college tennis at Idaho State before transferring to Utah.

== Professional career ==
=== 2023: Pro beginnings, First Challenger title ===
Trhac reached his first ITF-level final at the 2023 M15 San Diego, partnering Isaiah Strode. However, the pair lost to Daniel de Jonge and Andrew Rogers. With fellow American Ryan Seggerman, the duo won eight consecutive ITF doubles titles between July and October 2023.

The pair won their first ATP Challenger doubles title at the 2023 City of Playford Tennis International, and then won the 2023 NSW Open title the following week.

=== 2024: First ATP final, top 100 in doubles ===
In January 2024, following back-to-back Challenger titles at the Southern California Open I and II, Trhac and Seggerman received a wildcard for the Masters 1000 at Indian Wells, making their ATP debut. The pair defeated sixth-seeded Máximo González and Andrés Molteni in the first round. In the round of 16, they lost to eventual champions Wesley Koolhof and Nikola Mektić.

After 13 straight victories in ITF circuit and ATP Challenger Tour finals, the pair lost their first final at the 2024 Upper Austria Open.

They received entry into the 2024 Libéma Open, their second ATP-level event. As a result, Trhac reached the top 100 in doubles on June 24, 2024. With Seggerman, the duo won the Cranbrook Tennis Classic, their seventh Challenger-level title. As a result, Trhac rose to a new career-high doubles ranking of world No. 89 on July 15, 2024.

Trhac and Seggerman received a wildcard to the US Open, making their Grand Slam tournament debut, but lost in the first round to Yuki Bhambri and Albano Olivetti.

=== 2025: Tenth Challenger title with Seggerman, top 75 ===
Partnering Marcus Willis, Trhac reached his first ATP Tour doubles final at the Croatia Open, losing to fourth seeds Romain Arneodo and Manuel Guinard.

Trhac gained his first ATP singles ranking points at the 2025 Serve First Open, where he defeated Vladislav Melnic in the first qualifying round, before losing to longtime doubles partner Ryan Seggerman in the final qualifying round. Additionally, Trhac and Seggerman won their 10th Challenger doubles title together, defeating Sriram Balaji and Rithvik Choudary Bollipalli in the final.

== Doubles performance timeline ==
Key
W	F	SF	QF	#R	RR	Q#	DNQ	A	NH

(W) winner; (F) finalist; (SF) semifinalist; (QF) quarterfinalist; (#R) rounds 4, 3, 2, 1; (RR) round-robin stage; (Q#) qualification round; (DNQ) did not qualify; (A) absent; (NH) not held; (SR) strike rate (events won / competed); (W–L) win–loss record.
To avoid confusion and double counting, these charts are updated at the conclusion of a tournament or when the player's participation has ended.

Current through the 2025 Croatia Open.

Tournament	2024	2025	SR	W–L
Grand Slam tournaments
Australian Open	A	A	0 / 0	0–0
French Open	A	A	0 / 0	0–0
Wimbledon	A	2R	0 / 1	1–1
US Open	1R	1R	0 / 2	0–2
Win–loss	0–1	1–2	0 / 3	1–3
ATP Masters 1000
Indian Wells Open	2R	2R	0 / 2	2–2
Career statistics
Tournaments	5	5	10	
Titles	0	0	0	
Finals	0	1	1	
Overall win–loss	1–5	6–5	7–10	
Year-end ranking	91		41%	

== ATP Tour finals ==
=== Doubles: 2 (1 title, 1 runner-up) ===
Legend Grand Slam (0–0) ATP 1000 (0–0) ATP 500 (0–0) ATP 250 (1–1)	Finals by surface Hard (1–0) Clay (0–1) Grass (0–0)

Result	W–L	Date	Tournament	Tier	Surface	Partner	Opponents	Score
Loss	0–1	Jul 2025	Croatia Open, Croatia	ATP 250	Clay	(United Kingdom) Marcus Willis	(Monaco) Romain Arneodo (France) Manuel Guinard	5–7, 6–7^{(2–7)}
Win	1–1	Aug 2026	Los Cabos Open, Mexico	ATP 250	Hard	(United States) Ryan Seggerman	(New Zealand) Finn Reynolds (New Zealand) James Watt	7–6^{(7–4)}, 6–7^{(5–7)}, [10–8]

== ATP Challenger finals ==
=== Doubles: 20 (14–6) ===
Finals by surface
Hard (11–1)
Clay (2–4)
Grass (1–1)

Result	W–L	Date	Tournament	Surface	Partner	Opponents	Score
Win	1–0	Oct 2023	City of Playford, Australia	Hard	(United States) Ryan Seggerman	(Australia) Blake Ellis (Australia) Tristan Schoolkate	6–3, 7–6^{(7–3)}
Win	2–0	Nov 2023	Sydney, Australia	Hard	(United States) Ryan Seggerman	(Philippines) Ruben Gonzales (South Korea) Nam Ji-sung	6–4, 6–4
Win	3–0	Jan 2024	Indian Wells, US	Hard	(United States) Ryan Seggerman	(United States) Thai-Son Kwiatkowski (United States) Alex Lawson	6–2, 7–6^{(7–3)}
Win	4–0	Jan 2024	Indian Wells, US	Hard	(United States) Ryan Seggerman	(Australia) Thomas Fancutt (New Zealand) Ajeet Rai	6–4, 3–6, [10–3]
Win	5–0	Apr 2024	Mexico City, Mexico	Clay	(United States) Ryan Seggerman	(Australia) Tristan Schoolkate (Australia) Adam Walton	5–7, 6–4, [10–5]
Loss	5–1	May 2024	Mauthausen, Austria	Clay	(United States) Ryan Seggerman	(Germany) Constantin Frantzen (Germany) Hendrik Jebens	4–6, 4–6
Win	6–1	May 2024	Skopje, North Macedonia	Clay	(United States) Ryan Seggerman	(Czech Republic) Andrew Paulson (Czech Republic) Patrik Rikl	6–3, 7–6^{(7–4)}
Loss	6–2	Jun 2024	Sassuolo, Italy	Clay	(United States) Ryan Seggerman	(Italy) Marco Bortolotti (Australia) Matthew Romios	6–7^{(7–9)}, 6–2, [9–11]
Win	7–2	Jul 2024	Bloomfield Hills, US	Hard	(United States) Ryan Seggerman	(United States) Ozan Baris (United States) Nishesh Basavareddy	4–6, 6–3, [10–6]
Win	8–2	Oct 2024	Fairfield, US	Hard	(United States) Ryan Seggerman	(Romania) Gabi Adrian Boitan (United States) Bruno Kuzuhara	6–2, 3–6, [10–5]
Win	9–2	Oct 2024	Calgary, Canada	Hard	(United States) Ryan Seggerman	(United States) Robert Cash (United States) JJ Tracy	6–3, 7–6^{(7–3)}
Loss	9–3	Oct 2024	Sioux Falls, US	Hard (i)	(United States) Ryan Seggerman	(Canada) Liam Draxl (Canada) Cleeve Harper	5–7, 3–6
Loss	9–4	Apr 2025	Mexico City, Mexico	Clay	(United States) Ryan Seggerman	(Mexico) Santiago González (United States) Austin Krajicek	6–7^{(9–11)}, 6–3, [5–10]
Loss	9–5	Jun 2025	Birmingham, UK	Grass	(Ecuador) Diego Hidalgo	(Brazil) Marcelo Demoliner (France) Sadio Doumbia	4–6, 6–3, [5–10]
Win	10–5	Jun 2025	Ilkley, UK	Grass	(Ecuador) Diego Hidalgo	(United Kingdom) Charles Broom (United Kingdom) Ben Jones	6–3, 6–7^{(8–10)}, [10–7]
Win	11–5	Aug 2025	Sumter, United States	Hard	(United States) Ryan Seggerman	(India) Rithvik Choudary Bollipalli (India) Sriram Balaji	6–4, 7–6^{(7–3)}
Win	12–5	Nov 2025	Lyon, France	Hard (i)	(Ecuador) Diego Hidalgo	(India) Sriram Balaji (Germany) Hendrik Jebens	6–3, 6–4
Win	13–5	Mar 2026	Phoenix, US	Hard	(Ecuador) Diego Hidalgo	(Monaco) Hugo Nys (France) Édouard Roger-Vasselin	6–7^{(6–8)}, 6–3, [10–4]
Win	14–5	Mar 2026	Morelia, Mexico	Hard	(Ecuador) Diego Hidalgo	(United States) Nathaniel Lammons (United States) Jackson Withrow	7–6^{(7–5)}, 7–6^{(7–4)}
Loss	14–6	Apr 2026	Mexico City, Mexico	Clay	(Ecuador) Diego Hidalgo	(Mexico) Santiago González (United States) Ryan Seggerman	4–6, 6–4, [8–10].

== ITF finals ==
=== Doubles: 9 (8–1) ===
Finals by surface
Hard (7–1)
Clay (1–0)

Result	W–L	Date	Tournament	Surface	Partner	Opponents	Score
Loss	0–1	Jun 2023	M15 San Diego, US	Hard	(United States) Isaiah Strode	(Netherlands) Daniel de Jonge (United States) Andrew Rogers	6–3, 6–7^{(5–7)}, [4–10]
Win	1–1	Jul 2023	M15 Lakewood, US	Hard	(United States) Ryan Seggerman	(United States) Alfredo Perez (United States) Jamie Vance	6–2, 6–4
Win	2–1	Jul 2023	M15 Lakewood, US	Hard	(United States) Ryan Seggerman	(United States) Jack Anthrop (United States) Bryce Nakashima	7–5, 6–2
Win	3–1	Aug 2023	M25 Southaven, US	Hard	(United States) Ryan Seggerman	(Australia) Patrick Harper (Japan) Shunsuke Mitsui	6–4, 6–3
Win	4–1	Aug 2023	M15 Monastir, Tunisia	Hard	(United States) Ryan Seggerman	(Italy) Luca Fantini (Morocco) Younes Lalami Laaroussi	6–1, 6–3
Win	5–1	Aug 2023	M15 Monastir, Tunisia	Hard	(United States) Ryan Seggerman	(Slovakia) Lucas Pokorny (South Africa) Kris van Wyk	6–4, 7–5
Win	6–1	Sep 2023	M15 Monastir, Tunisia	Hard	(United States) Ryan Seggerman	(India) Chirag Duhan (United States) Garrett Johns	6–1, 6–3
Win	7–1	Sep 2023	M25 Monastir, Tunisia	Hard	(United States) Ryan Seggerman	(Australia) Thomas Braithwaite (Australia) Timothy Gray	7–5, 6–4
Win	8–1	Oct 2023	M25 Zapopan, Mexico	Clay	(United States) Ryan Seggerman	(Chile) Miguel Angel Cabrera (Brazil) Joao Vitor Goncalves Ceolin	6–2, 6–4
