= Ryan Seggerman =

American tennis player (born 1999)

- Country (sports): United States
- Born: August 6, 1999 (age 27) San Diego, United States
- Height: 6 ft 4 in (1.93 m)
- Plays: Right-handed
- College: Princeton; North Carolina
- Prize money: US $579,120

Singles
- Career record: 0–0
- Career titles: 0
- Highest ranking: No. 348 (August 26, 2024)
- Current ranking: No. 563 (November 2, 2026)

Doubles
- Career record: 32–36
- Career titles: 2
- Highest ranking: No. 45 (November 2, 2026)
- Current ranking: No. 45 (November 2, 2026)

Grand Slam doubles results
- Australian Open: 1R (2025, 2026)
- French Open: 2R (2025)
- Wimbledon: 2R (2025, 2026)
- US Open: 2R (2026)
- Last updated on: November 2, 2026.

Ryan Seggerman (born August 6, 1999) is an American tennis player who specializes in doubles. He has a career-high ATP doubles ranking of world No. 45 achieved on November 2, 2026, and a singles ranking of No. 348, reached on August 26, 2024.

Seggerman has won two ATP Tour doubles titles. He played college tennis at Princeton before transferring to North Carolina.

== Career ==
=== 2023: Eight straight ITF doubles titles ===
Seggerman won his first ITF singles title in 2023 at the M25 Monastir tournament, defeating Ilia Simakin in the final. With fellow American Patrik Trhac, the duo won eight consecutive ITF doubles titles between July and October 2023.

The pair won their first ATP Challenger doubles title at the 2023 City of Playford Tennis International, and then won the 2023 NSW Open title the following week.

=== 2024: ATP Tour and Grand Slam debuts ===
==== Singles ====
Seggerman reached the semifinals as a qualifier at both the 2024 Macedonian Open and at the 2024 Cranbrook Tennis Classic.

Seggerman reached the main draw as a qualifier at the 2024 Lexington Challenger, rising into the top 400 for the first time on 5 August 2024. He reached the quarterfinals of the RD Open, giving him a new career-high ranking of No. 350 on 19 August 2024. Seggerman received entry into the 2024 Winston-Salem Open qualifying singles draw, but lost in the first round.

==== Doubles ====
In January 2024, following back to back Challenger titles in 2024 Indian Wells, Seggerman and Trhac received a wildcard for the Masters 1000 2024 BNP Paribas Open, making their ATP debut. The pair defeated sixth-seeded Máximo González and Andrés Molteni in the first round. In the round of 16, they lost to eventual champions Wesley Koolhof and Nikola Mektić.

After 13 straight victories in ITF circuit and ATP Challenger Tour finals, the pair lost their first final at the 2024 Upper Austria Open. With Trhac, the pair received entry into the 2024 Libéma Open, their second tour-level event. As a result, Seggerman reached the top 100 in doubles on 24 June 2024.

With Trhac, the duo won the 2024 Cranbrook Tennis Classic, their seventh Challenger level title. As a result, Seggerman rose to a new career high doubles ranking of No. 89 on 15 July 2024.

Seggerman and Trhac received a wildcard to the 2024 US Open, making their Grand Slam debut but lost in the first round to Yuki Bhambri and Albano Olivetti.

Seggerman and Szymon Walków reached the final at the 2024 Szczecin Open. This gave Seggerman a new career high doubles ranking of world No. 87 on 16 September 2024.

=== 2025: Tenth Challenger title with Trhac, Top 75 ===
Seggerman began his 2025 campaign with a doubles title at the 2025 Canberra challenger, partnering countryman Eliot Spizzirri. The pair saved a championship point in their title match win over Pierre-Hugues Herbert and Jérôme Kym.

Seggerman made his Australian Open debut in the doubles tournament alongside Rithvik Choudary Bollipalli. The duo lost in straight sets to eventual champions Harri Heliövaara and Henry Patten.

Following the Australian Open, Seggerman partnered with John-Patrick Smith and they lost in the qualifying final in Dallas, the first round in Delray Beach, and the first qualifying round in Rio de Janeiro. They picked up their first two wins together at the 2025 Chile Open, reaching the semifinals before losing to top-seeded Máximo González and Andrés Molteni. As a result, Seggerman reached a career-high doubles ranking of No. 71 on 3 March 2025.

At the 2025 BNP Paribas Open, Seggerman rejoined Trhac at the same tournament where they won their first ATP match a year prior. The pair received entry as alternates, and defeated a team of top-20 singles players, Karen Khachanov and Andrey Rublev 6–2, 6(4)–7, [10–7].

At the 2025 Serve First Open, Trhac and Seggerman won their 10th Challenger doubles title together, defeating Sriram Balaji and Rithvik Choudary Bollipalli in the final.

== ATP Tour finals ==
=== Doubles: 4 (2 titles, 2 runner-ups) ===
Legend ATP 500 (0–1) ATP 250 (2–1)	Finals by surface Hard (2–2)	Finals by setting Outdoor (1–1) Indoor (1–1)

Result	W–L	Date	Tournament	Tier	Surface	Partner	Opponents	Score
Loss	0–1	Feb 2026	Delray Beach Open, US	ATP 250	Hard	(United States) Benjamin Kittay	(United States) Austin Krajicek (Croatia) Nikola Mektić	7–6^{(7–3)}, 3–6, [9–11]
Win	1–1	Aug 2026	Los Cabos Open, Mexico	ATP 250	Hard	(United States) Patrik Trhac	(New Zealand) Finn Reynolds (New Zealand) James Watt	7–6^{(7–4)}, 6–7^{(5–7)}, [10–8]
Win	2–1	Oct 2026	Almaty Open, Kazakhstan	ATP 250	Hard (i)	(India) Yuki Bhambri	(Austria) Lucas Miedler (Austria) Neil Oberleitner	7–6^{(7–3)}, 6–7^{(1–7)}, [10–2]
Loss	2–2	Oct 2026	Vienna Open, Austria	ATP 500	Hard (i)	(United States) Learner Tien	(Austria) Lucas Miedler (Austria) Neil Oberleitner	1–6, 5–7

== ATP Challenger and ITF Tour finals ==
=== Singles: 1 (title) ===
Result	W–L	Date	Tournament	Surface	Opponent	Score
Win	1–0	Sep 2023	M25 Monastir, Tunisia	Hard	Ilia Simakin	7–5, 6–4

=== Doubles: 37 (26 titles, 11 runner-ups) ===
Legend ATP Challenger (18–10) ITF Futures/World Tennis (8–1)	Finals by surface Hard (18–4) Clay (8–7)

Result	W–L	Date	Tournament	Surface	Partner	Opponents	Score
Win	1–0	Oct 2023	Playford International, Australia	Hard	(United States) Patrik Trhac	(Australia) Blake Ellis (Australia) Tristan Schoolkate	6–3, 7–6^{(7–3)}
Win	2–0	Nov 2023	Sydney International, Australia	Hard	(United States) Patrik Trhac	(Philippines) Ruben Gonzales (South Korea) Nam Ji-sung	6–4, 6–4
Win	3–0	Jan 2024	Southern California Open, US	Hard	(United States) Patrik Trhac	(United States) Thai-Son Kwiatkowski (United States) Alex Lawson	6–2, 7–6^{(7–3)}
Win	4–0	Jan 2024	Southern California Open, US (2)	Hard	(United States) Patrik Trhac	(Australia) Thomas Fancutt (New Zealand) Ajeet Rai	6–4, 3–6, [10–3]
Win	5–0	Apr 2024	Mexico City Open, Mexico	Clay	(United States) Patrik Trhac	(Australia) Tristan Schoolkate (Australia) Adam Walton	5–7, 6–4, [10–5]
Loss	5–1	May 2024	Danube Upper Open, Austria	Clay	(United States) Patrik Trhac	(Germany) Constantin Frantzen (Germany) Hendrik Jebens	4–6, 4–6
Win	6–1	May 2024	Macedonian Open, North Macedonia	Clay	(United States) Patrik Trhac	(Czech Republic) Andrew Paulson (Czech Republic) Patrik Rikl	6–3, 7–6^{(7–4)}
Loss	6–2	Jun 2024	Emilia-Romagna Open, Italy	Clay	(United States) Patrik Trhac	(Italy) Marco Bortolotti (Australia) Matthew Romios	6–7^{(7–9)}, 6–2, [9–11]
Win	7–2	Jul 2024	Cranbrook Tennis Classic, US	Hard	(United States) Patrik Trhac	(United States) Ozan Baris (United States) Nishesh Basavareddy	4–6, 6–3, [10–6]
Loss	7–3	Sep 2024	Szczecin Open, Poland	Clay	(Poland) Szymon Walków	(Argentina) Guido Andreozzi (France) Théo Arribagé	2–6, 1–6
Win	8–3	Oct 2024	Fairfield Challenger, US	Hard	(United States) Patrik Trhac	(Romania) Gabi Adrian Boitan (United States) Bruno Kuzuhara	6–2, 3–6, [10–5]
Win	9–3	Oct 2024	Calgary Challenger, Canada	Hard	(United States) Patrik Trhac	(United States) Robert Cash (United States) JJ Tracy	6–3, 7–6^{(7–3)}
Loss	9–4	Oct 2024	Sioux Falls Challenger, US	Hard (i)	(United States) Patrik Trhac	(Canada) Liam Draxl (Canada) Cleeve Harper	5–7, 3–6
Loss	9–5	Nov 2024	Puerto Vallarta Open, Mexico	Hard	(United States) Karl Poling	(Canada) Liam Draxl (Canada) Benjamin Sigouin	6–7^{(5–7)}, 2–6
Win	10–5	Jan 2025	Canberra International, Australia	Hard	(United States) Eliot Spizzirri	(France) Pierre-Hugues Herbert (Switzerland) Jérôme Kym	1–6, 7–5, [10–5]
Loss	10–6	Apr 2025	Mexico City Open, Mexico	Clay	(United States) Patrik Trhac	(Mexico) Santiago González (United States) Austin Krajicek	6–7^{(9–11)}, 6–3, [5–10]
Loss	10–7	Apr 2025	Danube Upper Open, Austria	Clay	(United Kingdom) David Stevenson	(Austria) Nico Hipfl (Switzerland) Jérôme Kym	5–7, 6–3, [2–10]
Win	11–7	Jun 2025	Emilia-Romagna Open, Italy	Clay	(Australia) Matthew Romios	(Austria) Alexander Erler (Germany) Constantin Frantzen	7–6^{(7–4)}, 3–6, [10–7]
Win	12–7	Jun 2025	Aspria Tennis Cup, Italy	Clay	(Australia) Matthew Romios	(United States) George Goldhoff (Chinese Taipei) Ray Ho	3–6, 7–5, [10–8]
Loss	12–8	Jul 2025	Iași Open, Romania	Clay	(Canada) Cleeve Harper	(Poland) Szymon Kielan (Poland) Filip Pieczonka	5–7, 3–6
Win	13–8	Aug 2025	Chicago Men's Challenger, US	Hard	(United States) Mac Kiger	(United States) Theodore Winegar (United States) Michael Zheng	6–4, 3–6, [10–5]
Win	14–8	Aug 2025	Serve First Open, US	Hard	(United States) Patrik Trhac	(India) Sriram Balaji (India) Rithvik Choudary Bollipalli	6–4, 7–6^{(7–3)}
Win	15–8	Sep 2025	Guangzhou International, China	Hard	(Australia) Matthew Romios	(Japan) Seita Watanabe (Japan) Kaito Uesugi	6–1, 6–3
Loss	15–9	Nov 2025	Champaign Challenger, US	Hard (i)	(United States) Keegan Smith	(Australia) Patrick Harper (Japan) Shunsuke Mitsui	5–7, 7–6^{(7–3)}, [10–12]
Win	16–9	Apr 2026	Mexico City Open, Mexico (2)	Clay	(Mexico) Santiago González	(Ecuador) Diego Hidalgo (United States) Patrik Trhac	6–4, 4–6, [10–8]
Win	17–9	May 2026	Abruzzo Open, Italy	Clay	(United States) Benjamin Kittay	(France) Arthur Reymond (France) Luca Sanchez	6–4, 7–6^{(7–3)}
Loss	17–10	June 2026	Internazionali Città di Perugia, Italy	Clay	(United States) Theodore Winegar	(Belgium) Sander Gillé (Netherlands) Sem Verbeek	6–7^{(3–7)}, 6–4, [6–10]
Win	18–10	Jun 2026	Emilia-Romagna Open, Italy (2)	Clay	(Switzerland) Jakub Paul	(Thailand) Pruchya Isaro (India) Niki Kaliyanda Poonacha	6–2, 7–6^{(7–5)}

Result	W–L	Date	Tournament	Surface	Partner	Opponents	Score
Loss	0–1	Sep 2016	US F29, Irvine	Hard	(United States) Timothy Sah	(United States) Mackenzie McDonald (United States) Deiton Baughman	4–6, 3–6
Win	1–1	Jul 2023	M15 Lakewood, US	Hard	(United States) Patrik Trhac	(United States) Alfredo Perez (United States) Jamie Vance	6–2, 6–4
Win	2–1	Jul 2023	M15 Lakewood, US	Hard	(United States) Patrik Trhac	(United States) Jack Anthrop (United States) Bryce Nakashima	7–5, 6–2
Win	3–1	Aug 2023	M25 Southaven, US	Hard	(United States) Patrik Trhac	(Australia) Patrick Harper (Japan) Shunsuke Mitsui	6–4, 6–3
Win	4–1	Aug 2023	M15 Monastir, Tunisia	Hard	(United States) Patrik Trhac	(Italy) Luca Fantini (Morocco) Younes Lalami Laaroussi	6–1, 6–3
Win	5–1	Aug 2023	M15 Monastir, Tunisia	Hard	(United States) Patrik Trhac	(Slovakia) Lukáš Pokorný (South Africa) Kris van Wyk	6–4, 7–5
Win	6–1	Sep 2023	M15 Monastir, Tunisia	Hard	(United States) Patrik Trhac	(India) Chirag Duhan (United States) Garrett Johns	6–1, 6–3
Win	7–1	Sep 2023	M25 Monastir, Tunisia	Hard	(United States) Patrik Trhac	(Australia) Thomas Braithwaite (Australia) Timothy Gray	7–5, 6–4
Win	8–1	Oct 2023	M25 Zapopan, Mexico	Clay	(United States) Patrik Trhac	(Chile) Miguel Ángel Cabrera (Brazil) João Vitor G. Ceolin	6–2, 6–4
