= Mexico City Open (tennis) =

- 2026 Mexico City Open

ATP Challenger Tour
- Event name: Mexico City Open
- Location: Mexico City, Mexico
- Venue: Estadio Rafael 'Pelón' Osuna, Centro Deportivo Chapultepec
- Category: ATP Challenger Tour 125
- Surface: Clay
- Prize money: $200,000 (2025), $164,000 (2024)
- Website: Website

The Mexico City Open is a professional tennis tournament played on clay courts. It is currently part of the Association of Tennis Professionals (ATP) Challenger Tour. It is held annually in Mexico City, Mexico. In December 2024 it was named ATP Challenger Tour's Tournament of the Year.

== Past finals ==
=== Singles ===
Year	Champion	Runner-up	Score
2026	(Australia) James Duckworth	(Italy) Stefano Napolitano	6–7^{(7–9)}, 7–6^{(7–3)}, 6–2
2025	(Brazil) Felipe Meligeni Alves	(France) Luka Pavlovic	6–3, 6–3
2024	(Argentina) Thiago Agustín Tirante	(Canada) Alexis Galarneau	6–1, 6–3
2023	(Germany) Dominik Koepfer	(Argentina) Thiago Agustín Tirante	2–6, 6–4, 6–2
2022	(Switzerland) Marc-Andrea Hüsler	(Argentina) Tomás Martín Etcheverry	6–4, 6–2

=== Doubles ===
Year	Champions	Runners-up	Score
2026	(Mexico) Santiago González (United States) Ryan Seggerman	(Ecuador) Diego Hidalgo (United States) Patrik Trhac	6–4, 4–6, [10–8]
2025	(Mexico) Santiago González (United States) Austin Krajicek	(United States) Ryan Seggerman (United States) Patrik Trhac	7–6^{(11–9)}, 3–6, [10–5]
2024	(United States) Ryan Seggerman (United States) Patrik Trhac	(Australia) Tristan Schoolkate (Australia) Adam Walton	5–7, 6–4, [10–5]
2023	(Bolivia) Boris Arias (Bolivia) Federico Zeballos	(United States) Evan King (United States) Reese Stalder	7–5, 5–7, [10–2]
2022	(Chile) Nicolás Jarry (Brazil) Matheus Pucinelli de Almeida	(France) Jonathan Eysseric (New Zealand) Artem Sitak	6–2, 6–3
