= 2025 Tunis Open – Singles =

Singles
- 2025 Tunis Open

Final
- Champion: (Hungary) Zsombor Piros
- Runner-up: (France) Titouan Droguet
- Score: 7–5, 7–6^{(7–3)}

Events
Singles	Doubles
← 2024 ·	Tunis Open	· 2026 →

Oriol Roca Batalla was the defending champion but lost in the second round to Zsombor Piros.

Piros won the title after defeating Titouan Droguet 7–5, 7–6^{(7–3)} in the final.

== Seeds ==
1. (France) Valentin Royer (quarterfinals)
2. (United States) Emilio Nava (second round)
3. (Argentina) Federico Coria (quarterfinals, retired)
4. (Hong Kong) Coleman Wong (quarterfinals)
5. (Luxembourg) Chris Rodesch (semifinals)
6. (Japan) Yuta Shimizu (second round)
7. (Tunisia) Aziz Dougaz (first round)
8. (Hungary) Zsombor Piros (champion)

== Draw ==
=== Key ===
- Q = Qualifier
- WC = Wild card
- LL = Lucky loser
- Alt = Alternate
- ITF = ITF entry
- PR = Protected ranking
- SR = Special ranking
- SE = Special exempt
- JE = Junior exempt
- JR = Junior Accelerator Programme entrant
- CO = College Accelerator Programme entrant
- NG = Next Gen Accelerator Program entrant
- w/o = Walkover
- r = Retired
- d = Defaulted

=== Finals ===
Semifinals
5	(Luxembourg) Chris Rodesch	2	6	2
(France) Titouan Droguet	6	1	6
Q	Ivan Gakhov	2	1
8	(Hungary) Zsombor Piros	6	6

Final
(France) Titouan Droguet	5	6^{3}
8	(Hungary) Zsombor Piros	7	7^{7}

=== Top half ===
First round
1	(France) V Royer	6	6
Alt	(France) R Bertrand	3	2
WC	(Tunisia) M Echargui	7^{7}	6
Q	(New Zealand) J Watt	6^{5}	3
(Romania) FC Jianu	3	2
JR	(Czech Republic) M Mrva	6	6
(Germany) H Squire	3	6^{6}
5	(Luxembourg) C Rodesch	6	7^{8}
3	(Argentina) F Coria	6	7
WC	(Tunisia) A Ouakaa	3	5
Alt	(France) C Denolly	4	2
Alt	(Italy) E Dalla Valle	6	6
(France) Mathys Erhard	6	4	3
(France) T Droguet	2	6	6
WC	(France) B Paire	1^{r}
6	(Japan) Y Shimizu	4

Second round
1	(France) V Royer	6	4	6
WC	(Tunisia) M Echargui	4	6	0
JR	(Czech Republic) M Mrva	1	4
5	(Luxembourg) C Rodesch	6	6
3	(Argentina) F Coria	6	7
Alt	(Italy) E Dalla Valle	4	5
(France) T Droguet	6	6
6	(Japan) Y Shimizu	4	3

Quarterfinals
1	(France) V Royer	3	4
5	(Luxembourg) C Rodesch	6	6
3	(Argentina) F Coria	1	1^{r}
(France) T Droguet	6	1

Semifinals
5	(Luxembourg) C Rodesch	2	6	2
(France) T Droguet	6	1	6

=== Bottom half ===
First round
7	(Tunisia) A Dougaz	6	6^{4}	5
(Australia) B Tomic	1	7^{7}	7
Q	I Gakhov	6^{5}	7^{7}	6
Q	(Spain) Àlex Martí Pujolràs	7^{7}	6^{3}	1
Q	(Germany) C Negritu	4	7	4
(Bolivia) M Dellien	6	5	6
(Mexico) R Pacheco Méndez	2	2
4	(Hong Kong) C Wong	6	6
8	(Hungary) Z Piros	7	6
Q	(Czech Republic) H Bartoň	5	2
(Spain) O Roca Batalla	6	6
(Lithuania) E Butvilas	3	3
SE	(Italy) F Maestrelli	7^{9}	6
(Switzerland) R Bertola	6^{7}	4
Q	(France) D Added	2	5
2	(United States) Em Nava	6	7

Second round
(Australia) B Tomic	1	4
Q	I Gakhov	6	6
(Bolivia) M Dellien	5	5
4	(Hong Kong) C Wong	7	7
8	(Hungary) Z Piros	6	6
(Spain) O Roca Batalla	4	2
SE	(Italy) F Maestrelli	7^{7}	6
2	(United States) Em Nava	6^{1}	3

Quarterfinals
Q	I Gakhov	6^{3}	6	6
4	(Hong Kong) C Wong	7^{7}	2	4
8	(Hungary) Z Piros	6	6
SE	(Italy) F Maestrelli	3	2

Semifinals
Q	I Gakhov	2	1
8	(Hungary) Z Piros	6	6
