= 2014 Tunis Open – Singles =

Singles
- 2014 Tunis Open

Final
- Champion: (Italy) Simone Bolelli
- Runner-up: (Germany) Julian Reister
- Score: 6–4, 6–2

Events
Singles	Doubles
← 2013 ·	Tunis Open	· 2018 →

Adrian Ungur was the defending champion, but lost in the quarterfinals to Mate Delić.

Simone Bolelli won the title, defeating Julian Reister in the final, 6–4, 6–2.

== Seeds ==
1. (France) Kenny de Schepper (first round)
2. (Germany) Tobias Kamke (first round)
3. (Russia) Evgeny Donskoy (quarterfinals)
4. (Argentina) Facundo Argüello (second round, retired)
5. (Romania) Adrian Ungur (quarterfinals)
6. (Tunisia) Malek Jaziri (first round)
7. (Germany) Julian Reister (final)
8. (France) Pierre-Hugues Herbert (first round)

== Draw ==
=== Key ===
- Q = Qualifier
- WC = Wild card
- LL = Lucky loser
- Alt = Alternate
- SE = Special exempt
- PR = Protected ranking
- ITF = ITF entry
- JE = Junior exempt
- w/o = Walkover
- r = Retired
- d = Defaulted
- SR = Special ranking

=== Finals ===
Semifinals
PR	(Italy) Simone Bolelli	6	6
SE	(Croatia) Mate Delić	4	4
7	(Germany) Julian Reister	6	6
(Turkey) Marsel İlhan	1	1

Final
PR	(Italy) Simone Bolelli	6	6
7	(Germany) Julian Reister	4	2

=== Top half ===
First round
1	(France) K de Schepper	6	2	4
PR	(Italy) S Bolelli	4	6	6
Q	(Spain) J Lizariturry	4	3
(Italy) T Fabbiano	6	6
(France) V Millot	3	2^{r}
(Italy) A Arnaboldi	6	5
(France) G Burquier	5	7	6
6	(Tunisia) M Jaziri	7	5	3
4	(Argentina) F Argüello	6	7
(Spain) J Checa Calvo	1	5
SE	(Croatia) M Delić	6	6
WC	(Tunisia) Ameur Ben Hassen	3	4
(France) M Gicquel	6	3	6
(Romania) M Copil	2	6	3
(Netherlands) J Huta Galung	2^{r}
5	(Romania) A Ungur	5

Second round
PR	(Italy) S Bolelli	6	6
(Italy) T Fabbiano	3	4
(Italy) A Arnaboldi	6	6
(France) G Burquier	2	2
4	(Argentina) F Argüello	3	0^{r}
SE	(Croatia) M Delić	6	2
(France) M Gicquel	2	3
5	(Romania) A Ungur	6	6

Quarterfinals
PR	(Italy) S Bolelli	6	6
(Italy) A Arnaboldi	0	3
SE	(Croatia) M Delić	6	6
5	(Romania) A Ungur	4	1

Semifinals
PR	(Italy) S Bolelli	6	6
SE	(Croatia) M Delić	4	4

=== Bottom half ===
First round
7	(Germany) J Reister	6	6
WC	(Portugal) Danyal Sualehe	0	0
(Italy) M Cecchinato	4	6	6
WC	(Tunisia) Abid Mehdi	6	1	2
(Italy) P Starace	6	6
(France) D Guez	3	1
PR	(Spain) I Cervantes	6^{5}	7	0^{r}
3	(Russia) E Donskoy	7^{7}	5	5
8	(France) PH Herbert	2	3
(Croatia) A Pavić	6	6
Q	(Italy) F Cipolla	6^{8}	6	6
Q	(Italy) G Naso	7^{10}	0	1
Q	(Italy) A Giannessi	5	4
(Turkey) M İlhan	7	6
WC	(Morocco) L Ouahab	6^{5}	6	6
2	(Germany) T Kamke	7^{7}	4	1

Second round
7	(Germany) J Reister	6	7^{8}
(Italy) M Cecchinato	2	6^{6}
(Italy) P Starace	5	6^{0}
3	(Russia) E Donskoy	7	7^{7}
(Croatia) A Pavić	6	4	6
Q	(Italy) F Cipolla	3	6	2
(Turkey) M İlhan	5	6	6
WC	(Morocco) L Ouahab	7	4	3

Quarterfinals
7	(Germany) J Reister	6	6
3	(Russia) E Donskoy	2	1
(Croatia) A Pavić	4	4
(Turkey) M İlhan	6	6

Semifinals
7	(Germany) J Reister	6	6
(Turkey) M İlhan	1	1
