= 2019 Tunis Open – Singles =

Singles
- 2019 Tunis Open

Final
- Champion: (Uruguay) Pablo Cuevas
- Runner-up: (Portugal) João Domingues
- Score: 7–5, 6–4

Events
Singles	Doubles
← 2018 ·	Tunis Open	· 2022 →

Guido Andreozzi was the defending champion but chose not to defend his title.

Pablo Cuevas won the title after defeating João Domingues 7–5, 6–4 in the final.

== Seeds ==
All seeds receive a bye into the second round.

1. (Uruguay) Pablo Cuevas (champion)
2. (Portugal) Pedro Sousa (third round)
3. (Spain) Guillermo García López (second round)
4. (Spain) Pedro Martínez (second round)
5. (Argentina) Facundo Bagnis (second round)
6. (Germany) Oscar Otte (third round)
7. (France) Quentin Halys (second round)
8. (Italy) Stefano Travaglia (second round)
9. (Belgium) Ruben Bemelmans (third round)
10. (Italy) Lorenzo Giustino (semifinals)
11. (Estonia) Jürgen Zopp (second round)
12. (Spain) Daniel Gimeno Traver (quarterfinals)
13. (Argentina) Facundo Argüello (quarterfinals)
14. (Italy) Roberto Marcora (second round)
15. (Italy) Stefano Napolitano (second round)
16. (Russia) Alexey Vatutin (second round)

== Draw ==
=== Key ===
- Q = Qualifier
- WC = Wild card
- LL = Lucky loser
- Alt = Alternate
- SE = Special exempt
- PR = Protected ranking
- ITF = ITF entry
- JE = Junior exempt
- w/o = Walkover
- r = Retired
- d = Defaulted
- SR = Special ranking

=== Finals ===
Quarterfinals
1/WC	(Uruguay) Pablo Cuevas	6	7
12	(Spain) Daniel Gimeno Traver	2	5
13	(Argentina) Facundo Argüello	6	3	4
10	(Italy) Lorenzo Giustino	2	6	6
(Italy) Gian Marco Moroni	7	4	5
(Portugal) João Domingues	5	6	7
(Brazil) Thomaz Bellucci	6	6
(Hungary) Attila Balázs	2	2

Semifinals
1/WC	(Uruguay) Pablo Cuevas	6	6
10	(Italy) Lorenzo Giustino	2	4
(Portugal) João Domingues	6	6
(Brazil) Thomaz Bellucci	4	4

Final
1/WC	(Uruguay) Pablo Cuevas	7	6
(Portugal) João Domingues	5	4

=== Top half ===
==== Section 1 ====
First round
(Argentina) P Cachin	6	6
ITF	(Russia) I Nedelko	3	2
(Serbia) V Troicki	6^{4}	6	3
WC	(Tunisia) A Dougaz	7^{7}	4	0^{r}
(Croatia) V Galović	6	4	6
(Spain) M Vilella Martínez	2	6	4
(France) B Bonzi	6	2	5
(Italy) F Gaio	2	6	7

Second round
1/WC	(Uruguay) P Cuevas	6	6
(Argentina) P Cachin	3	2
(Serbia) V Troicki	7	7^{7}
15	(Italy) S Napolitano	5	6^{4}
12	(Spain) D Gimeno Traver	7	6
(Croatia) V Galović	5	1
(Italy) F Gaio	6	3	6
8	(Italy) S Travaglia	2	6	4

Third round
1/WC	(Uruguay) P Cuevas	7	6
(Serbia) V Troicki	5	4
12	(Spain) D Gimeno Traver	7	6
(Italy) F Gaio	5	3

Quarterfinals
1/WC	(Uruguay) P Cuevas	6	7
12	(Spain) D Gimeno Traver	2	5

==== Section 2 ====
First round
ITF	(Tunisia) S Mansouri	6	7^{7}
(France) E Benchetrit	4	6^{5}
Q	(Spain) D Vega Hernández	3	1
(Bosnia and Herzegovina) T Brkić	6	6
(Czech Republic) Z Kolař	6	6
ITF	(Spain) D Pérez Sanz	4	3
(France) J Tatlot	6	6^{4}	6
(France) G Sakharov	1	7^{7}	3

Second round
4	(Spain) P Martínez	6	3	4
ITF	(Tunisia) S Mansouri	1	6	6
(Bosnia and Herzegovina) T Brkić	4	3
13	(Argentina) F Argüello	6	6
10	(Italy) L Giustino	6	6
(Czech Republic) Z Kolař	1	3
(France) J Tatlot	6	7^{7}
5	(Argentina) F Bagnis	2	6^{1}

Third round
ITF	(Tunisia) S Mansouri	5	3
13	(Argentina) F Argüello	7	6
10	(Italy) L Giustino	6	5	6
(France) J Tatlot	1	7	3

Quarterfinals
13	(Argentina) F Argüello	6	3	4
10	(Italy) L Giustino	2	6	6

=== Bottom half ===
==== Section 3 ====
First round
(Bosnia and Herzegovina) A Šetkić	4	4
(Romania) D Dima	6	6
(Italy) GM Moroni	6	5	7
ITF	(Italy) R Bonadio	3	7	5
ITF	(Spain) O Roca Batalla	2	6	4
(Argentina) F Coria	6	4	6
(Germany) K Krawietz	2	4
(Portugal) J Domingues	6	6

Second round
6	(Germany) O Otte	7^{7}	7^{9}
(Romania) D Dima	6^{5}	6^{7}
(Italy) GM Moroni	6	6^{3}	6
11	(Estonia) J Zopp	4	7^{7}	2
14	(Italy) R Marcora	3	4
(Argentina) F Coria	6	6
(Portugal) J Domingues	6	5	6
3/WC	(Spain) G García López	4	7	4

Third round
6	(Germany) O Otte	2	3
(Italy) GM Moroni	6	6
(Argentina) F Coria	4	6	2
(Portugal) J Domingues	6	3	6

Quarterfinals
(Italy) GM Moroni	7	4	5
(Portugal) J Domingues	5	6	7

==== Section 4 ====
First round
(Germany) D Masur	6	2	5
(Brazil) T Bellucci	2	6	7
(Croatia) N Serdarušić	6	6
WC	(Chinese Taipei) C-h Tseng	4	3
WC	(Tunisia) M Echargui	2	0
(Hungary) A Balázs	6	6
Alt	(France) A Escoffier	4	3
Q	(Italy) A Vavassori	6	6

Second round
7	(France) Q Halys	6	4	2
(Brazil) T Bellucci	1	6	6
(Croatia) N Serdarušić	4	3
9	(Belgium) R Bemelmans	6	6
16	(Russia) A Vatutin	5	2
(Hungary) A Balázs	7	6
Q	(Italy) A Vavassori	2	6	1
2	(Portugal) P Sousa	6	2	6

Third round
(Brazil) T Bellucci	2	6	6
9	(Belgium) R Bemelmans	6	3	3
(Hungary) A Balázs	4	6	6
2	(Portugal) P Sousa	6	3	2

Quarterfinals
(Brazil) T Bellucci	6	6
(Hungary) A Balázs	2	2
