= 2014 Tunis Open – Doubles =

Doubles
- 2014 Tunis Open

Final
- Champions: (France) Pierre-Hugues Herbert (Canada) Adil Shamasdin
- Runners-up: (Netherlands) Stephan Fransen (Netherlands) Jesse Huta Galung
- Score: 6–3, 7–6^{(7–5)}

Events
Singles	Doubles
← 2013 ·	Tunis Open	· 2018 →

Dominik Meffert and Philipp Oswald were the defending champions, but did not compete.

Pierre-Hugues Herbert and Adil Shamasdin won the title, defeating Stephan Fransen and Jesse Huta Galung in the final, 6–3, 7–6^{(7–5)}.

== Seeds ==
1. (United States) James Cerretani / (Sweden) Andreas Siljeström (semifinals)
2. (France) Pierre-Hugues Herbert / (Canada) Adil Shamasdin (champions)
3. (Philippines) Ruben Gonzales / (New Zealand) Artem Sitak (first round)
4. (Netherlands) Stephan Fransen / (Netherlands) Jesse Huta Galung (final)

== Draw ==
=== Key ===
- Q = Qualifier
- WC = Wild card
- LL = Lucky loser
- Alt = Alternate
- SE = Special exempt
- PR = Protected ranking
- ITF = ITF entry
- JE = Junior exempt
- w/o = Walkover
- r = Retired
- d = Defaulted
- SR = Special ranking

=== Draw ===
First round
1	(United States) J Cerretani (Sweden) A Siljeström
(Italy) S Bolelli (Italy) P Starace	w/o
(Romania) M Copil (Romania) A Ungur	6	5	[4]
PR	(Argentina) F Argüello (Spain) I Cervantes	3	7	[10]
4	(Netherlands) S Fransen (Netherlands) JH Galung	6	4	[10]
(France) M Gicquel (France) D Guez	1	6	[4]
(Italy) F Cipolla (Germany) J Reister	6	6
WC	(France) G Burquier (France) F Serra	4	2
WC	(Spain) J Lizariturry (Morocco) L Ouahab	6	6
(Croatia) A Pavić (Serbia) G Tošić	2	1
(Italy) A Arnaboldi (Italy) T Fabbiano	7^{9}	6^{6}	[10]
3	(Philippines) R Gonzales (New Zealand) A Sitak	6^{7}	7^{8}	[8]
WC	(Tunisia) Mehdi Abid (Tunisia) Ameur Ben Hassen	3	6^{2}
(Netherlands) A van der Duim (Netherlands) B Westerhof	6	7^{7}
(Italy) M Cecchinato (Italy) A Giannessi	1	2
2	(France) P-H Herbert (Canada) A Shamasdin	6	6

Quarterfinals
1	(United States) J Cerretani (Sweden) A Siljeström
PR	(Argentina) F Argüello (Spain) I Cervantes	w/o
4	(Netherlands) S Fransen (Netherlands) JH Galung	6	6
(Italy) F Cipolla (Germany) J Reister	4	0
WC	(Spain) J Lizariturry (Morocco) L Ouahab	1	0
(Italy) A Arnaboldi (Italy) T Fabbiano	6	6
(Netherlands) A van der Duim (Netherlands) B Westerhof	3	0
2	(France) P-H Herbert (Canada) A Shamasdin	6	6

Semifinals
1	(United States) J Cerretani (Sweden) A Siljeström	6^{2}	6	[6]
4	(Netherlands) S Fransen (Netherlands) JH Galung	7^{7}	3	[10]
(Italy) A Arnaboldi (Italy) T Fabbiano	3	4
2	(France) P-H Herbert (Canada) A Shamasdin	6	6

Final
4	(Netherlands) S Fransen (Netherlands) JH Galung	3	6^{5}
2	(France) P-H Herbert (Canada) A Shamasdin	6	7^{7}
