= 2019 Tunis Open – Doubles =

Doubles
- 2019 Tunis Open

Final
- Champions: (Belgium) Ruben Bemelmans (Germany) Tim Pütz
- Runners-up: (Argentina) Facundo Argüello (Argentina) Guillermo Durán
- Score: 6–3, 6–1

Events
Singles	Doubles
← 2018 ·	Tunis Open	· 2022 →

Denys Molchanov and Igor Zelenay were the defending champions but chose not to defend their title.

Ruben Bemelmans and Tim Pütz won the title after defeating Facundo Argüello and Guillermo Durán 6–3, 6–1 in the final.

== Seeds ==
1. (Belgium) Sander Gillé / (India) Leander Paes (first round)
2. (France) Jonathan Eysseric / (Croatia) Antonio Šančić (quarterfinals)
3. (Italy) Andrea Vavassori / (Spain) David Vega Hernández (semifinals)
4. (Bosnia and Herzegovina) Tomislav Brkić / (Croatia) Tomislav Draganja (semifinals)

== Draw ==
=== Key ===
- Q = Qualifier
- WC = Wild card
- LL = Lucky loser
- Alt = Alternate
- SE = Special exempt
- PR = Protected ranking
- ITF = ITF entry
- JE = Junior exempt
- w/o = Walkover
- r = Retired
- d = Defaulted
- SR = Special ranking

First round
1	(Belgium) S Gillé (India) L Paes	6	4	[10]
(Argentina) F Argüello (Argentina) G Durán	1	6	[12]
WC	(Tunisia) Skander Ben Abdallah (Tunisia) Adam Nagoudi	1	1
(France) B Bonzi (France) Q Halys	6	6
4	(Bosnia and Herzegovina) T Brkić (Croatia) T Draganja	3	6	[10]
(Sweden) A Siljeström (Poland) S Walków	6	3	[7]
(Portugal) J Domingues (Portugal) P Sousa	3	6^{4}
(Spain) D Gimeno Traver (Spain) P Martínez	6	7^{7}
WC	(Tunisia) S Mansouri (Serbia) N Zimonjić	6	6
WC	(Tunisia) A Ghorbel (Bulgaria) V Mladenov	4	4
ITF	(Spain) S Martos Gornés (Spain) D Pérez Sanz	4	1
3	(Italy) A Vavassori (Spain) D Vega Hernández	6	6
(Belgium) R Bemelmans (Germany) T Pütz	6	7^{7}
(Czech Republic) Z Kolář (Netherlands) M Vervoort	4	6^{5}
Alt	(Argentina) F Agamenone (Argentina) F Bagnis	4	2
2	(France) J Eysseric (Croatia) A Šančić	6	6

Quarterfinals
(Argentina) F Argüello (Argentina) G Durán	7^{7}	6
(France) B Bonzi (France) Q Halys	6^{5}	4
4	(Bosnia and Herzegovina) T Brkić (Croatia) T Draganja	7	6
(Spain) D Gimeno Traver (Spain) P Martínez	5	2
WC	(Tunisia) S Mansouri (Serbia) N Zimonjić	2	6^{3}
3	(Italy) A Vavassori (Spain) D Vega Hernández	6	7^{7}
(Belgium) R Bemelmans (Germany) T Pütz	6	6
2	(France) J Eysseric (Croatia) A Šančić	4	1

Semifinals
(Argentina) F Argüello (Argentina) G Durán	6	6
4	(Bosnia and Herzegovina) T Brkić (Croatia) T Draganja	3	2
3	(Italy) A Vavassori (Spain) D Vega Hernández	6^{5}	7^{7}	[5]
(Belgium) R Bemelmans (Germany) T Pütz	7^{7}	6^{4}	[10]

Final
(Argentina) F Argüello (Argentina) G Durán	3	1
(Belgium) R Bemelmans (Germany) T Pütz	6	6
