= 2024 Tunis Open – Doubles =

Doubles
- 2024 Tunis Open

Final
- Champions: (Argentina) Federico Agustín Gómez (United Kingdom) Marcus Willis
- Runners-up: (Czech Republic) Patrik Rikl (Czech Republic) Michael Vrbenský
- Score: 4–6, 6–1, [10–6]

Events
Singles	Doubles
← 2023 ·	Tunis Open	· 2025 →

Théo Arribagé and Luca Sanchez were the defending champions but only Sanchez chose to defend his title, partnering Clément Chidekh. They lost in the quarterfinals to Patrik Rikl and Michael Vrbenský.

Federico Agustín Gómez and Marcus Willis won the title after defeating Rikl and Vrbenský 4–6, 6–1, [10–6] in the final.

== Seeds ==
1. (Spain) Sergio Martos Gornés / (Greece) Petros Tsitsipas (quarterfinals)
2. (United States) Ryan Seggerman / (United States) Patrik Trhac (first round)
3. (Argentina) Federico Agustín Gómez / (United Kingdom) Marcus Willis (champions)
4. (United Kingdom) Scott Duncan / (United Kingdom) Ben Jones (first round)

== Draw ==
=== Key ===
- Q = Qualifier
- WC = Wild card
- LL = Lucky loser
- Alt = Alternate
- ITF = ITF entry
- PR = Protected ranking
- SR = Special ranking
- SE = Special exempt
- JE = Junior exempt
- JR = Junior Accelerator Programme entrant
- CO = College Accelerator Programme entrant
- NG = Next Gen Accelerator Program entrant
- w/o = Walkover
- r = Retired
- d = Defaulted

=== Draw ===
First round
1	(Spain) S Martos Gornés (Greece) Pe Tsitsipas	6	6
WC	(Tunisia) Mehdi Ben Arab (Tunisia) Anas Bennour Dit Sahli	1	1
WC	(Tunisia) Rayen Hermassi (Tunisia) Omar Knani	4	7	[8]
Aleksandr Lobanov (Tunisia) A Ouakaa	6	5	[10]
3	(Argentina) FA Gómez (United Kingdom) M Willis	6	6
(Italy) Augusto Virgili (Italy) Alexander Weis	3	3
(Peru) A Merino (Germany) C Negritu	6	7
(Dominican Republic) N Hardt (Australia) A Taylor	1	5
(France) C Chidekh (France) L Sanchez	6	7
(Croatia) Z Babić (New Zealand) F Reynolds	4	5
(Czech Republic) P Rikl (Czech Republic) M Vrbenský	6	6
4	(United Kingdom) S Duncan (United Kingdom) B Jones	2	2
(United States) Nicholas Bybel (United Kingdom) O Crawford	6	6
(Austria) F Misolic (Egypt) M Safwat	2	3
(Bosnia and Herzegovina) D Džumhur (Serbia) M Sabanov	6	7^{7}
2	(United States) R Seggerman (United States) P Trhac	4	6^{4}

Quarterfinals
1	(Spain) S Martos Gornés (Greece) Pe Tsitsipas	6^{4}	3
A Lobanov (Tunisia) A Ouakaa	7^{7}	6
3	(Argentina) FA Gómez (United Kingdom) M Willis	6^{5}	6	[10]
(Peru) A Merino (Germany) C Negritu	7^{7}	2	[7]
(France) C Chidekh (France) L Sanchez	2	3
(Czech Republic) P Rikl (Czech Republic) M Vrbenský	6	6
(United States) N Bybel (United Kingdom) O Crawford
(Bosnia and Herzegovina) D Džumhur (Serbia) M Sabanov	w/o

Semifinals
A Lobanov (Tunisia) A Ouakaa	2	3
3	(Argentina) FA Gómez (United Kingdom) M Willis	6	6
(Czech Republic) P Rikl (Czech Republic) M Vrbenský	6	6
(Bosnia and Herzegovina) D Džumhur (Serbia) M Sabanov	3	3

Final
3	(Argentina) FA Gómez (United Kingdom) M Willis	4	6	[10]
(Czech Republic) P Rikl (Czech Republic) M Vrbenský	6	1	[6]
