= 2019 Tunis Open =

- Date: 15–21 April
- Edition: 11th
- Draw: 48S / 16D
- Surface: Clay
- Location: Tunis, Tunisia

Champions

Singles
- (Uruguay) Pablo Cuevas

Doubles
- (Belgium) Ruben Bemelmans / (Germany) Tim Pütz
| ← 2018 · | Tunis Open | · 2022 → |

The 2019 Tunis Open was a professional tennis tournament played on clay courts. It was the eleventh edition of the tournament which was part of the 2019 ATP Challenger Tour. It took place in Tunis, Tunisia between 15 and 21 April 2019.

== Singles main-draw entrants ==
=== Seeds ===
| Country | Player | Rank^{1} | Seed |
|---|---|---|---|
| URU | Pablo Cuevas | 83 | 1 |
| POR | Pedro Sousa | 105 | 2 |
| ESP | Guillermo García López | 115 | 3 |
| ESP | Pedro Martínez | 140 | 4 |
| ARG | Facundo Bagnis | 142 | 5 |
| GER | Oscar Otte | 150 | 6 |
| FRA | Quentin Halys | 153 | 7 |
| ITA | Stefano Travaglia | 155 | 8 |
| BEL | Ruben Bemelmans | 163 | 9 |
| ITA | Lorenzo Giustino | 169 | 10 |
| EST | Jürgen Zopp | 171 | 11 |
| ESP | Daniel Gimeno Traver | 189 | 12 |
| ARG | Facundo Argüello | 190 | 13 |
| ITA | Roberto Marcora | 193 | 14 |
| ITA | Stefano Napolitano | 199 | 15 |
| RUS | Alexey Vatutin | 201 | 16 |

- ^{1} Rankings are as of 8 April 2019.

=== Other entrants ===
The following players received wildcards into the singles main draw:

- (Uruguay) Pablo Cuevas
- (Tunisia) Aziz Dougaz
- (Tunisia) Moez Echargui
- (Spain) Guillermo García López
- (Chinese Taipei) Tseng Chun-hsin

The following player received entry into the singles main draw as an alternate:

- (France) Antoine Escoffier

The following players received entry into the singles main draw using their ITF World Tennis Ranking:

- (Italy) Riccardo Bonadio
- (Tunisia) Skander Mansouri
- (Russia) Ivan Nedelko
- (Spain) David Pérez Sanz
- (Spain) Oriol Roca Batalla

The following players received entry from the qualifying draw:

- (Italy) Andrea Vavassori
- (Spain) David Vega Hernández

== Champions ==
=== Singles ===
- (Uruguay) Pablo Cuevas def. (Portugal) João Domingues 7–5, 6–4.

=== Doubles ===
- (Belgium) Ruben Bemelmans / (Germany) Tim Pütz def. (Argentina) Facundo Argüello / (Argentina) Guillermo Durán 6–3, 6–1.
