= 2012 Tunis Open – Singles =

Singles
- 2012 Tunis Open

Final
- Champion: (Spain) Rubén Ramírez Hidalgo
- Runner-up: (France) Jérémy Chardy
- Score: 6–1, 6–4

Events
Singles	Doubles
← 2010 ·	Tunis Open	· 2013 →

José Acasuso was the defending champion but decided not to participate.
Rubén Ramírez Hidalgo won the title defeating Jérémy Chardy in the final 6–1, 6–4.

== Seeds ==
1. (Spain) Marcel Granollers (semifinals)
2. (France) Jérémy Chardy (final)
3. (Tunisia) Malek Jaziri (second round)
4. (Spain) Rubén Ramírez Hidalgo (champion)
5. (Argentina) Horacio Zeballos (second round)
6. (Estonia) Jürgen Zopp (semifinals)
7. (Italy) Alessandro Giannessi (second round, withdrew due to a throat infection)
8. (Turkey) Marsel İlhan (quarterfinals)

== Draw ==
=== Key ===
- Q = Qualifier
- WC = Wild card
- LL = Lucky loser
- Alt = Alternate
- SE = Special exempt
- PR = Protected ranking
- ITF = ITF entry
- JE = Junior exempt
- w/o = Walkover
- r = Retired
- d = Defaulted
- SR = Special ranking

=== Finals ===
Semifinals
1/WC	(Spain) Marcel Granollers	6^{4}	6^{3}
4	(Spain) Rubén Ramírez Hidalgo	7^{7}	7^{7}
6	(Estonia) Jürgen Zopp	1	6^{2}
2	(France) Jérémy Chardy	6	7^{7}

Final
4	(Spain) Rubén Ramírez Hidalgo	6	6
2	(France) Jérémy Chardy	1	4

=== Top half ===
First round
1/WC	(Spain) M Granollers	6	7
(Japan) Y Sugita	2	5
(France) G Burquier	2	6^{4}
(Italy) M Viola	6	7^{7}
(Spain) R Bautista-Agut	6	6
Q	(Italy) R Ghedin	0	3
(France) F Serra	0	7	2
5	(Argentina) H Zeballos	6	5	6
4	(Spain) R Ramírez Hidalgo	6	6
Q	(France) Laurent Rochette	0	3
Q	(Italy) Antonio Comporto	6	6^{0}	0
(France) S Robert	2	7^{7}	6
(Poland) J Janowicz	7	6
(France) K de Schepper	5	4
WC	(Tunisia) Skander Mansouri	3	2
7	(Italy) A Giannessi	6	6

Second round
1/WC	(Spain) M Granollers	6	6
(Italy) M Viola	3	1
(Spain) R Bautista-Agut	4	6	6
5	(Argentina) H Zeballos	6	4	1
4	(Spain) R Ramírez Hidalgo	6^{5}	6	6
(France) S Robert	7^{7}	4	2
(Poland) J Janowicz	w/o
7	(Italy) A Giannessi

Quarterfinals
1/WC	(Spain) M Granollers	6	7
(Spain) R Bautista-Agut	3	5
4	(Spain) R Ramírez Hidalgo	7	6
(Poland) J Janowicz	5	2

Semifinals
1/WC	(Spain) M Granollers	6^{4}	6^{3}
4	(Spain) R Ramírez Hidalgo	7^{7}	7^{7}

=== Bottom half ===
First round
6	(Estonia) J Zopp	6^{14}	7^{7}	6
(Spain) A Menéndez	7^{16}	6^{5}	1
Q	(Italy) G Naso	6	6
SE	(France) V Millot	4	3
(France) M Gicquel	6	6
WC	(Tunisia) H Abid	0	1
(France) M Teixeira	3	6	4
3	(Tunisia) M Jaziri	6	3	6
8	(Turkey) M İlhan	7^{7}	4	6
(France) R Jouan	6^{3}	6	3
(Italy) S Galvani	1	0^{0}
(France) A Gensse	6	1
(Germany) P Torebko	4	6	5
WC	(Algeria) L Ouahab	6	4	7
SE	(Bosnia and Herzegovina) M Bašić	4	4
2	(France) J Chardy	6	6

Second round
6	(Estonia) J Zopp	6	6
Q	(Italy) G Naso	2	4
(France) M Gicquel	7^{7}	6
3	(Tunisia) M Jaziri	6^{5}	0
8	(Turkey) M İlhan	4
(France) A Gensse	1^{r}
WC	(Algeria) L Ouahab	3	6	6^{1}
2	(France) J Chardy	6	4	7^{7}

Quarterfinals
6	(Estonia) J Zopp	6	7^{7}
(France) M Gicquel	1	6^{3}
8	(Turkey) M İlhan	4	6	4
2	(France) J Chardy	6	4	6

Semifinals
6	(Estonia) J Zopp	1	6^{2}
2	(France) J Chardy	6	7^{7}
