= 2012 Tunis Open – Doubles =

Doubles
- 2012 Tunis Open

Final
- Champions: (Poland) Jerzy Janowicz (Estonia) Jürgen Zopp
- Runners-up: (United States) Nicholas Monroe (Germany) Simon Stadler
- Score: 7–6^{(7–1)}, 6–3

Events
Singles	Doubles
← 2010 ·	Tunis Open	· 2013 →

Jeff Coetzee and Kristof Vliegen were the defending champions but decided not to participate.
Jerzy Janowicz and Jürgen Zopp won the title after defeating Nicholas Monroe and Simon Stadler 7–6^{(7–1)}, 6–3 in the final.

== Seeds ==
1. (Spain) Adrián Menéndez / (Argentina) Horacio Zeballos (quarterfinals)
2. (United States) Nicholas Monroe / (Germany) Simon Stadler (finals)
3. (Spain) Roberto Bautista-Agut / (Spain) Rubén Ramírez Hidalgo (quarterfinals)
4. (France) Stéphane Robert / (France) Laurent Rochette (quarterfinals)

== Draw ==
=== Key ===
- Q = Qualifier
- WC = Wild card
- LL = Lucky loser
- Alt = Alternate
- SE = Special exempt
- PR = Protected ranking
- ITF = ITF entry
- JE = Junior exempt
- w/o = Walkover
- r = Retired
- d = Defaulted
- SR = Special ranking

=== Draw ===
First round
(Tunisia) H Abid (Tunisia) M Jaziri	3	1
(France) G Burquier (France) R Jouan	6	6
4	(France) S Robert (France) Laurent Rochette	7^{7}	2	[10]
(Italy) S Ianni (Germany) P Torebko	6^{3}	6	[6]
(France) J Chardy (France) M Gicquel	6	5	[7]
(Poland) J Janowicz (Estonia) J Zopp	1	7	[10]
(Italy) A di Mauro (Italy) G Naso	w/o
(Italy) A Giannessi (Italy) M Viola
(Italy) Antonio Comporto (Tunisia) Skander Mansouri	1	1
3	(Spain) R Bautista-Agut (Spain) R Ramírez Hidalgo	6	6
WC	(Tunisia) Mohammed Affes (Tunisia) Maher Boughnimi	0	4
(Italy) S Galvani (Italy) R Ghedin	6	6
WC	(Tunisia) Mehdi Abid (Tunisia) Ameur Ben Hassen	2	3
2	(United States) N Monroe (Germany) S Stadler	6	6

Quarterfinals
1	(Spain) A Menéndez (Argentina) H Zeballos	7	2	[7]
(France) G Burquier (France) R Jouan	5	6	[10]
4	(France) S Robert (France) Laurent Rochette	3	3
(Poland) J Janowicz (Estonia) J Zopp	6	6
(Italy) A di Mauro (Italy) G Naso	6	5	[10]
3	(Spain) R Bautista-Agut (Spain) R Ramírez Hidalgo	3	7	[8]
(Italy) S Galvani (Italy) R Ghedin	2	4
2	(United States) N Monroe (Germany) S Stadler	6	6

Semifinals
(France) G Burquier (France) R Jouan	3	5
(Poland) J Janowicz (Estonia) J Zopp	6	7
(Italy) A di Mauro (Italy) G Naso	7	2	[10]
2	(United States) N Monroe (Germany) S Stadler	5	6	[12]

Final
(Poland) J Janowicz (Estonia) J Zopp	7^{7}	6
2	(United States) N Monroe (Germany) S Stadler	6^{1}	3
