= 2025 Tunis Open =

- Date: 12–17 May
- Edition: 15th
- Surface: Clay
- Location: Tunis, Tunisia

Champions

Singles
- (Hungary) Zsombor Piros

Doubles
- (Czech Republic) Hynek Bartoň / (Czech Republic) Michael Vrbenský
← 2024 ·	Tunis Open	· 2026 →

The 2025 Tunis Open, known as the Kia Tunis Open, was a professional tennis tournament played on clay courts. It was the 15th edition of the tournament which was part of the 2025 ATP Challenger Tour. It took place in Tunis, Tunisia between 12 and 17 May 2025.

== Singles main-draw entrants ==
=== Seeds ===
Country	Player	Rank^{1}	Seed
FRA	Valentin Royer	117	1
USA	Emilio Nava	137	2
ARG	Federico Coria	141	3
HKG	Coleman Wong	174	4
LUX	Chris Rodesch	178	5
JPN	Yuta Shimizu	193	6
TUN	Aziz Dougaz	198	7
HUN	Zsombor Piros	204	8

- ^{1} Rankings are as of 5 May 2025.

=== Other entrants ===
The following players received wildcards into the singles main draw:

- (Tunisia) Moez Echargui
- (Tunisia) Aziz Ouakaa
- (France) Benoît Paire

The following player received entry into the singles main draw as a special exempt:

- (Italy) Francesco Maestrelli

The following player received entry into the singles main draw through the Junior Accelerator programme:

- (Czech Republic) Maxim Mrva

The following players received entry into the singles main draw as alternates:

- (France) Robin Bertrand
- (Italy) Enrico Dalla Valle
- (France) Corentin Denolly

The following players received entry from the qualifying draw:

- (France) Dan Added
- (Czech Republic) Hynek Bartoň
- Ivan Gakhov
- (Spain) Àlex Martí Pujolràs
- (Germany) Christoph Negritu
- (New Zealand) James Watt

== Champions ==
=== Singles ===
- (Hungary) Zsombor Piros def. (France) Titouan Droguet 7–5, 7–6^{(7–3)}.

=== Doubles ===
- (Czech Republic) Hynek Bartoň / (Czech Republic) Michael Vrbenský def. (India) Siddhant Banthia / (Bulgaria) Alexander Donski 5–7, 6–4, [10–7].
