= 2010 Tunis Open – Singles =

Singles
- 2010 Tunis Open

Final
- Champion: (Argentina) José Acasuso
- Runner-up: (Germany) Daniel Brands
- Score: 6–3, 6–4

Events
Singles	Doubles
← 2009 ·	Tunis Open	· 2012 →

Gastón Gaudio was the defending champion, but he chose not to compete due to a foot injury.
José Acasuso won in the final 6–3, 6–4 against Daniel Brands.

== Seeds ==
1. (France) Florent Serra (first round)
2. (France) Arnaud Clément (first round)
3. (Ukraine) Illya Marchenko (second round)
4. (Germany) Daniel Brands (final)
5. (Russia) Igor Kunitsyn (first round)
6. (Portugal) Rui Machado (second round)
7. (Portugal) Frederico Gil (semifinals)
8. (Belgium) Christophe Rochus (second round)

== Draw ==
=== Key ===
- Q = Qualifier
- WC = Wild card
- LL = Lucky loser
- Alt = Alternate
- SE = Special exempt
- PR = Protected ranking
- ITF = ITF entry
- JE = Junior exempt
- w/o = Walkover
- r = Retired
- d = Defaulted
- SR = Special ranking

=== Finals ===
Semifinals
7	(Portugal) Frederico Gil	6^{6}	1
4	(Germany) Daniel Brands	7	6
(Belgium) Kristof Vliegen	0	1^{r}
(Argentina) José Acasuso	6	2

Final
4	(Germany) Daniel Brands	3	4
(Argentina) José Acasuso	6	6

=== Top half ===
First round
1	(France) F Serra	4	3
(France) É Roger-Vasselin	6	6
(Spain) R Ramírez Hidalgo	4	1
(Spain) D Muñoz-De La Nava	6	6
WC	(Morocco) R El Amrani	6^{1}	6	6
(Slovakia) D Hrbatý	7	2	3
(Serbia) I Bozoljac	6^{10}	6	2
7	(Portugal) F Gil	7	2	6
4	(Germany) D Brands	6	6
WC	(Germany) N Kiefer	2	4
Q	(Portugal) J Sousa	6	5	4
WC	(Tunisia) M Jaziri	1	7	6
Q	(Spain) I Cervantes-Huegun	3	7	2
(France) V Millot	6	5	6
(France) L Recouderc	2	4
6	(Portugal) R Machado	6	6

Second round
(France) É Roger-Vasselin	6	6
(Spain) D Muñoz-De La Nava	1	4
WC	(Morocco) R El Amrani	4	3
7	(Portugal) F Gil	6	6
4	(Germany) D Brands	7	6
WC	(Tunisia) M Jaziri	6^{5}	1
(France) V Millot	6	6
6	(Portugal) R Machado	4	2

Quarterfinals
(France) É Roger-Vasselin	6^{5}	6	2
7	(Portugal) F Gil	7	2	6
4	(Germany) D Brands	5	6	7
(France) V Millot	7	3	6^{2}

Semifinals
7	(Portugal) F Gil	6^{6}	1
4	(Germany) D Brands	7	6

=== Bottom half ===
First round
5	(Russia) I Kunitsyn	5	4
(Germany) J Reister	7	6
(Algeria) L Ouahab	6	6
Q	(Serbia) B Pašanski	2	3
(Belgium) K Vliegen	4	6	7
(Chile) J Aguilar	6	3	6^{3}
WC	(Morocco) M Ziadi	2	2
3	(Ukraine) I Marchenko	6	6
8	(Belgium) C Rochus	6	6
(France) T Ascione	4	2
(Turkey) M İlhan	6	6
(France) J Ouanna	4	4
(Argentina) J Acasuso	6	6
(Spain) P Andújar	2	4
Q	(Germany) P Torebko	7	6
2	(France) A Clément	6^{4}	3

Second round
(Germany) J Reister	5	5^{r}
(Algeria) L Ouahab	7	5
(Belgium) K Vliegen	3	7	7
3	(Ukraine) I Marchenko	6	6^{3}	6^{4}
8	(Belgium) C Rochus	6	5	2
(Turkey) M İlhan	1	7	6
(Argentina) J Acasuso	6	6
Q	(Germany) P Torebko	3	4

Quarterfinals
(Algeria) L Ouahab	2	6^{6}
(Belgium) K Vliegen	6	7
(Turkey) M İlhan	2	6	4
(Argentina) J Acasuso	6	4	6

Semifinals
(Belgium) K Vliegen	0	1^{r}
(Argentina) J Acasuso	6	2
