= 2009 Tunis Open – Doubles =

Doubles
- 2009 Tunis Open

Final
- Champions: (Argentina) Brian Dabul (Argentina) Leonardo Mayer
- Runners-up: (Sweden) Johan Brunström (Netherlands Antilles) Jean-Julien Rojer
- Score: 6–4, 7–6(6)

Events
Singles	Doubles
← 2008 ·	Tunis Open	· 2010 →

Thomaz Bellucci and Bruno Soares were the defending champions; however, they didn't play this year.
Brian Dabul and Leonardo Mayer defeated 6–4, 7–6(6) Johan Brunström and Jean-Julien Rojer in the final.

== Seeds ==
1. (Australia) Paul Hanley / (United Kingdom) Jamie Murray (first round)
2. (Sweden) Johan Brunström / (Netherlands Antilles) Jean-Julien Rojer (final)
3. (United States) James Cerretani / (Belgium) Dick Norman (quarterfinals)
4. (Argentina) Sebastián Prieto / (Argentina) Sergio Roitman (quarterfinals)

== Draw ==
=== Key ===
- Q = Qualifier
- WC = Wild card
- LL = Lucky loser
- Alt = Alternate
- ITF = ITF entry
- PR = Protected ranking
- SR = Special ranking
- SE = Special exempt
- JE = Junior exempt
- JR = Junior Accelerator Programme entrant
- CO = College Accelerator Programme entrant
- NG = Next Gen Accelerator Program entrant
- w/o = Walkover
- r = Retired
- d = Defaulted

=== Draw ===
First round
1	(Australia) P Hanley (United Kingdom) J Murray	4	6	[5]
(Brazil) M Daniel (Argentina) D Junqueira	6	4	[10]
ALT	(Serbia) I Bozoljac (Serbia) D Savić	6	2	[6]
WC	(Tunisia) I Jallali (Tunisia) W Jallali	3	6	[10]
4	(Argentina) S Prieto (Argentina) S Roitman	3	6	[10]
(Spain) P Andújar (France) A Sidorenko	6	2	[4]
(Australia) R Junaid (Germany) P Marx	5	2
(Argentina) B Dabul (Argentina) L Mayer	7	6
(Switzerland) Y Allegro (Romania) H Tecău	6	6
WC	(Tunisia) M Jaziri (Algeria) L Ouahab	1	3
(Italy) A Motti (Italy) S Vagnozzi	6^{1}	3
3	(United States) J Cerretani (Belgium) D Norman	7	6
WC	(Tunisia) A Ghorbel (Tunisia) F Zaier	2	2
(Portugal) R Machado (Spain) D Muñoz-De La Nava	6	6
(France) M Montcourt (France) L Recouderc	2	4
2	(Sweden) J Brunström (Netherlands Antilles) J-J Rojer	6	6

Quarterfinals
(Brazil) M Daniel (Argentina) D Junqueira	3	6	[10]
WC	(Tunisia) I Jallali (Tunisia) W Jallali	6	1	[5]
4	(Argentina) S Prieto (Argentina) S Roitman	7	3	[7]
(Argentina) B Dabul (Argentina) L Mayer	6^{5}	6	[10]
(Switzerland) Y Allegro (Romania) H Tecău	6	6
3	(United States) J Cerretani (Belgium) D Norman	3	3
(Portugal) R Machado (Spain) D Muñoz-De La Nava	4	2
2	(Sweden) J Brunström (Netherlands Antilles) J-J Rojer	6	6

Semifinals
(Brazil) M Daniel (Argentina) D Junqueira	4	1
(Argentina) B Dabul (Argentina) L Mayer	6	6
(Switzerland) Y Allegro (Romania) H Tecău	2	5
2	(Sweden) J Brunström (Netherlands Antilles) J-J Rojer	6	7

Finals
(Argentina) B Dabul (Argentina) L Mayer	6	7
2	(Sweden) J Brunström (Netherlands Antilles) J-J Rojer	4	6^{6}
