= 2009 Tunis Open – Singles =

Singles
- 2009 Tunis Open

Final
- Champion: (Argentina) Gastón Gaudio
- Runner-up: (Portugal) Frederico Gil
- Score: 6–2, 1–6, 6–3

Events
Singles	Doubles
← 2008 ·	Tunis Open	· 2010 →

Thomaz Bellucci was the defender of championship title, but he chose to not participate this year.
Gastón Gaudio won in the final 6–2, 1–6, 6–3, against Frederico Gil.

== Seeds ==
1. (Finland) Jarkko Nieminen (semifinals)
2. (France) Nicolas Devilder (second round)
3. (Germany) Björn Phau (second round)
4. (Portugal) Frederico Gil (final)
5. (Argentina) Diego Junqueira (quarterfinals)
6. (Spain) Pablo Andújar (first round)
7. (United States) Wayne Odesnik (first round)
8. (Argentina) Leonardo Mayer (first round)

== Draw ==
=== Key ===
- Q = Qualifier
- WC = Wild card
- LL = Lucky loser
- Alt = Alternate
- SE = Special exempt
- PR = Protected ranking
- ITF = ITF entry
- JE = Junior exempt
- w/o = Walkover
- r = Retired
- d = Defaulted
- SR = Special ranking

=== Final four ===
Semifinals
1	(Finland) Jarkko Nieminen	2	0^{r}
WC	(Argentina) Gastón Gaudio	6	1
4	(Portugal) Frederico Gil	6	6
(Croatia) Roko Karanušić	1	0

Final
WC	(Argentina) Gastón Gaudio	6	1	6
4	(Portugal) Frederico Gil	2	6	3

=== Top half ===
First round
1	(Finland) J Nieminen	7	3	7
(Spain) D Muñoz-De La Nava	5	6	6^{4}
(Argentina) B Dabul	6	2	6
WC	(Tunisia) M Jaziri	4	6	3
(Argentina) G Cañas	7	1	6
Q	(Portugal) P Sousa	5	6	3
(Germany) D Gremelmayr	6	6^{1}	6
8	(Argentina) L Mayer	1	7	3
3	(Germany) B Phau	7	7
(Serbia) D Savić	5	5
(Germany) D Brands	4	2
WC	(Argentina) G Gaudio	6	6
(France) A Sidorenko	6	6
WC	(Romania) A Ungur	3	2
(Algeria) L Ouahab	6	7
(Spain) P Andújar	1	6^{6}

Second round
1	(Finland) J Nieminen	4	6	6
(Argentina) B Dabul	6	2	3
(Argentina) G Cañas	6^{5}	7	6
(Germany) D Gremelmayr	7	6^{4}	0
3	(Germany) B Phau	6	2	4
WC	(Argentina) G Gaudio	3	6	6
(France) A Sidorenko	6	6
(Algeria) L Ouahab	1	2

Quarterfinals
1	(Finland) J Nieminen	6	6
(Argentina) G Cañas	2	4
WC	(Argentina) G Gaudio	6	6
(France) A Sidorenko	0	2

Semifinals
1	(Finland) J Nieminen	2	0^{r}
WC	(Argentina) G Gaudio	6	1

=== Bottom half ===
First round
7	(United States) W Odesnik	3	2
(Brazil) M Daniel	6	6
(Kazakhstan) M Kukushkin	6	4	2
(Portugal) R Machado	2	6	6
(Croatia) A Veić	6	3	6
Q	(Spain) A Ramos-Viñolas	1	6	3
(Argentina) S Roitman	4	1
4	(Portugal) F Gil	6	6
5	(Argentina) D Junqueira	3	7	6
(Serbia) I Bozoljac	6	5	3
Q	(France) L Recouderc	6	7
(France) M Montcourt	3	5
(Croatia) R Karanušić	6	6
WC	(Tunisia) W Jallali	2	2
(Serbia) B Pašanski	6^{1}	6^{4}
2	(France) N Devilder	7	7

Second round
(Brazil) M Daniel	1	2
(Portugal) R Machado	6	6
(Croatia) A Veić	4	2
4	(Portugal) F Gil	6	6
5	(Argentina) D Junqueira	6	6
Q	(France) L Recouderc	4	2
(Croatia) R Karanušić	7	3	6
2	(France) N Devilder	6^{2}	6	3

Quarterfinals
(Portugal) R Machado	1	6^{6}
4	(Portugal) F Gil	6	7
5	(Argentina) D Junqueira	7	4	2
(Croatia) R Karanušić	6^{6}	6	6

Semifinals
4	(Portugal) F Gil	6	6
(Croatia) R Karanušić	1	0
