= 2022 Tunis Open – Doubles =

Doubles
- 2022 Tunis Open

Final
- Champions: (Colombia) Nicolás Barrientos (Mexico) Miguel Ángel Reyes-Varela
- Runners-up: (Austria) Alexander Erler (Austria) Lucas Miedler
- Score: 6–7^{(3–7)}, 6–3, [11–9]

Events
Singles	Doubles
← 2019 ·	Tunis Open	· 2023 →

Ruben Bemelmans and Tim Pütz were the defending champions but chose not to defend their title.

Nicolás Barrientos and Miguel Ángel Reyes-Varela won the title after defeating Alexander Erler and Lucas Miedler 6–7^{(3–7)}, 6–3, [11–9] in the final.

== Seeds ==
1. (Austria) Alexander Erler / (Austria) Lucas Miedler (final)
2. (Colombia) Nicolás Barrientos / (Mexico) Miguel Ángel Reyes-Varela (champions)
3. (United States) Nicholas Monroe / (Brazil) Fernando Romboli (first round)
4. (Poland) Karol Drzewiecki / (United States) Alex Lawson (semifinals)

== Draw ==
=== Key ===
- Q = Qualifier
- WC = Wild card
- LL = Lucky loser
- Alt = Alternate
- SE = Special exempt
- PR = Protected ranking
- ITF = ITF entry
- JE = Junior exempt
- w/o = Walkover
- r = Retired
- d = Defaulted
- SR = Special ranking

First round
1	(Austria) A Erler (Austria) L Miedler	7^{7}	6
(France) M Janvier (Tunisia) M Jaziri	6^{4}	4
(Germany) N Kuhn (Spain) A Menéndez Maceiras	4	7^{7}	[5]
(Netherlands) G Brouwer (Netherlands) J Sels	6	6^{3}	[10]
4	(Poland) K Drzewiecki (United States) A Lawson	4	6	[12]
(Italy) R Brancaccio (Spain) Eduard Esteve Lobato	6	3	[10]
(Tunisia) S Mansouri (Australia) L Tu	6	7^{8}
(United States) E King (Switzerland) L Margaroli	4	6^{6}
(India) S Balaji (India) J Nedunchezhiyan	6	6
WC	(Tunisia) M Echargui (Germany) Elmar Ejupovic	3	4
(Belgium) M Geerts (Czech Republic) M Vrbenský	6	6
3	(United States) N Monroe (Brazil) F Romboli	4	3
PR	(Spain) Í Cervantes (Spain) O Roca Batalla	6	3	[10]
(Poland) D Michalski (Spain) N Sánchez Izquierdo	3	6	[7]
WC	(Tunisia) Wissam Abderrahman (Tunisia) A Ouakaa	5	2
2	(Colombia) N Barrientos (Mexico) MÁ Reyes-Varela	7	6

Quarterfinals
1	(Austria) A Erler (Austria) L Miedler	6	6
(Netherlands) G Brouwer (Netherlands) J Sels	3	2
4	(Poland) K Drzewiecki (United States) A Lawson	6	7^{7}
(Tunisia) S Mansouri (Australia) L Tu	2	6^{3}
(India) S Balaji (India) J Nedunchezhiyan	6	7^{7}
(Belgium) M Geerts (Czech Republic) M Vrbenský	1	6^{1}
PR	(Spain) Í Cervantes (Spain) O Roca Batalla	6	2	[12]
2	(Colombia) N Barrientos (Mexico) MÁ Reyes-Varela	4	6	[14]

Semifinals
1	(Austria) A Erler (Austria) L Miedler	6^{10}	7^{7}	[10]
4	(Poland) K Drzewiecki (United States) A Lawson	7^{12}	6^{4}	[4]
(India) S Balaji (India) J Nedunchezhiyan	6^{4}	3
2	(Colombia) N Barrientos (Mexico) MÁ Reyes-Varela	7^{7}	6

Final
1	(Austria) A Erler (Austria) L Miedler	7^{7}	3	[9]
2	(Colombia) N Barrientos (Mexico) MÁ Reyes-Varela	6^{3}	6	[11]
