= 2010 Tunis Open – Doubles =

Doubles
- 2010 Tunis Open

Final
- Champions: (South Africa) Jeff Coetzee (Belgium) Kristof Vliegen
- Runners-up: (United States) James Cerretani (Canada) Adil Shamasdin
- Score: 7–6^{(7–3)}, 6–3

Events
| Singles | Doubles |
| ← 2009 · | Tunis Open | · 2012 → |

Brian Dabul and Leonardo Mayer were the defending champions; however, Dabul chose to compete in Manta instead and Mayer chose to compete in Rome instead.
Jeff Coetzee and Kristof Vliegen won in the final 7–6^{(7–3)}, 6–3, against James Cerretani and Adil Shamasdin.

== Seeds ==
1. (India) Rohan Bopanna / (Pakistan) Aisam-ul-Haq Qureshi (quarterfinals)
2. (Czech Republic) Leoš Friedl / (Czech Republic) David Škoch (quarterfinals)
3. (Argentina) Sebastián Prieto / (Netherlands) Rogier Wassen (first round)
4. (United Kingdom) Jamie Delgado / (United Kingdom) Colin Fleming (first round)

== Draw ==
=== Key ===
- Q = Qualifier
- WC = Wild card
- LL = Lucky loser
- Alt = Alternate
- ITF = ITF entry
- PR = Protected ranking
- SR = Special ranking
- SE = Special exempt
- JE = Junior exempt
- JR = Junior Accelerator Programme entrant
- CO = College Accelerator Programme entrant
- NG = Next Gen Accelerator Program entrant
- w/o = Walkover
- r = Retired
- d = Defaulted

=== Draw ===
First round
1 | (India) R Bopanna (Pakistan) A-u-H Qureshi | w/o
(France) T Ascione (France) A Clément
(Portugal) F Gil (Brazil) M Melo | 6 | 6
WC | (Morocco) R El Amrani (Tunisia) M Jaziri | 4 | 0
3 | (Argentina) S Prieto (Netherlands) R Wassen | 6^{3} | 6 | [7]
WC | (Spain) D Muñoz-De La Nava (Morocco) M Ziadi | 7 | 1 | [10]
(South Africa) J Coetzee (Belgium) K Vliegen | 6 | 6
(Algeria) L Ouahab (Spain) R Ramírez Hidalgo | 2 | 1
(Portugal) R Machado (France) É Roger-Vasselin | 6 | 6
WC | (Spain) P Andújar (Belgium) C Rochus | 2 | 3
(Serbia) I Bozoljac (Romania) H Tecău | 6 | 6
4 | (United Kingdom) J Delgado (United Kingdom) C Fleming | 1 | 1
(United States) J Cerretani (Canada) A Shamasdin | 6 | 6
(Australia) R Junaid (Italy) A Motti | 1 | 2
(Germany) D Brands (Germany) J Reister | 6 | 1 | [8]
2 | (Czech Republic) L Friedl (Czech Republic) D Škoch | 3 | 6 | [10]

Quarterfinals
1 | (India) R Bopanna (Pakistan) A-u-H Qureshi | 5 | 6 | [9]
(Portugal) F Gil (Brazil) M Melo | 7 | 3 | [11]
(Spain) D Muñoz-De La Nava (Morocco) M Ziadi | 6 | 6^{3} | [5]
(South Africa) J Coetzee (Belgium) K Vliegen | 3 | 7 | [10]
(Portugal) R Machado (France) É Roger-Vasselin | 7 | 2 | [15]
(Serbia) I Bozoljac (Romania) H Tecău | 6^{7} | 6 | [13]
(United States) J Cerretani (Canada) A Shamasdin | 7 | 6
2 | (Czech Republic) L Friedl (Czech Republic) D Škoch | 6^{6} | 4

Semifinals
(Portugal) F Gil (Brazil) M Melo | 2 | 6^{5}
(South Africa) J Coetzee (Belgium) K Vliegen | 6 | 7
(Portugal) R Machado (France) É Roger-Vasselin | 0 | 3
(United States) J Cerretani (Canada) A Shamasdin | 6 | 6

Finals
(South Africa) J Coetzee (Belgium) K Vliegen | 7 | 6
(United States) J Cerretani (Canada) A Shamasdin | 6^{3} | 3
