= 2012 Tunis Open =

- Date: April 30 – May 6
- Edition: 7th
- Surface: Clay
- Location: Tunis, Tunisia

Champions

Singles
- (Spain) Rubén Ramírez Hidalgo

Doubles
- (Poland) Jerzy Janowicz / (Estonia) Jürgen Zopp
← 2010 ·	Tunis Open	· 2013 →

The 2012 Tunis Open was a professional tennis tournament played on clay courts. It was the seventh edition of the tournament which was part of the 2012 ATP Challenger Tour and the Tretorn SERIE+ tour. It took place in Tunis, Tunisia between April 30 and May 6, 2012.

== ATP entrants ==
=== Seeds ===
Country	Player	Rank^{1}	Seed
ESP	Marcel Granollers	26	1
FRA	Jérémy Chardy	59	2
TUN	Malek Jaziri	87	3
ESP	Rubén Ramírez Hidalgo	99	4
ARG	Horacio Zeballos	115	5
EST	Jürgen Zopp	125	6
ITA	Alessandro Giannessi	128	7
TUR	Marsel İlhan	129	8

- ^{1} Rankings are as of April 23, 2012.

=== Other entrants ===
The following players received wildcards into the singles main draw:

- (Tunisia) Haithem Abid
- (Spain) Marcel Granollers
- (Tunisia) Skander Mansouri
- (Algeria) Lamine Ouahab

The following players received entry as a special exempt into the singles main draw:

- (Bosnia and Herzegovina) Mirza Bašić
- (France) Vincent Millot

The following players received entry from the qualifying draw:

- (Italy) Antonio Comporto
- (Italy) Riccardo Ghedin
- (Italy) Gianluca Naso
- (France) Laurent Rochette

== Champions ==
=== Singles ===
- (Spain) Rubén Ramírez Hidalgo def. (France) Jérémy Chardy, 6–1, 6–4

=== Doubles ===
- (Poland) Jerzy Janowicz / (Estonia) Jürgen Zopp def. (United States) Nicholas Monroe / (Germany) Simon Stadler, 7–6^{(7–1)}, 6–3
