= 2014 Tunis Open =

- Date: 28 April – 4 May
- Edition: 9th
- Draw: 32S / 16D
- Prize money: $125,000+H
- Surface: Clay
- Location: Tunis, Tunisia

Champions

Singles
- (Italy) Simone Bolelli

Doubles
- (France) Pierre-Hugues Herbert / (Canada) Adil Shamasdin
← 2013 ·	Tunis Open	· 2018 →

The 2014 Tunis Open was a professional tennis tournament played on clay courts. It was the ninth edition of the tournament which was part of the 2014 ATP Challenger Tour. It took place in Tunis, Tunisia between 28 April and 4 May 2014.

== Singles main-draw entrants ==
=== Seeds ===
Country	Player	Rank	Seed
FRA	Kenny de Schepper	63	1
GER	Tobias Kamke	91	2
RUS	Evgeny Donskoy	99	3
ARG	Facundo Argüello	107	4
ROU	Adrian Ungur	118	5
TUN	Malek Jaziri	120	6
GER	Julian Reister	128	7
FRA	Pierre-Hugues Herbert	135	8

=== Other entrants ===
The following players received wildcards into the singles main draw:

- (Tunisia) Ameur Ben Hassen
- (Portugal) Danyal Sualehe
- (Tunisia) Abid Mehdi
- (Morocco) Lamine Ouahab

The following players received entry from the qualifying draw:

- (Italy) Gianluca Naso
- (Spain) Juan Lizariturry
- (Italy) Alessandro Giannessi
- (Italy) Flavio Cipolla

== Doubles main-draw entrants ==
=== Seeds ===
Country	Player	Country	Player	Rank	Seed
USA	James Cerretani	SWE	Andreas Siljeström	260	1
FRA	Pierre-Hugues Herbert	CAN	Adil Shamasdin	267	2
PHI	Ruben Gonzales	NZL	Artem Sitak	300	3
NED	Stephan Fransen	NED	Jesse Huta Galung	305	4

=== Other entrants ===
The following pairs received wildcards into the doubles main draw:

- (France) Grégoire Burquier / (France) Florent Serra
- (Spain) Juan Lizariturry / (Morocco) Lamine Ouahab
- (Tunisia) Mehdi Abid / (Tunisia) Ameur Ben Hassen

== Champions ==
=== Singles ===
- (Italy) Simone Bolelli def. (Germany) Julian Reister, 6–4, 6–2

=== Doubles ===
- (France) Pierre-Hugues Herbert / (Canada) Adil Shamasdin def. (Netherlands) Stephan Fransen / (Netherlands) Jesse Huta Galung, 6–3, 7–6^{(7–5)}
