= 2025 Tunis Open – Doubles =

Doubles
- 2025 Tunis Open

Final
- Champions: (Czech Republic) Hynek Bartoň (Czech Republic) Michael Vrbenský
- Runners-up: (India) Siddhant Banthia (Bulgaria) Alexander Donski
- Score: 5–7, 6–4, [10–7]

Events
Singles	Doubles
- Tunis Open

Federico Agustín Gómez and Marcus Willis were the defending champions but chose not to defend their title.

Hynek Bartoň and Michael Vrbenský won the title after defeating Siddhant Banthia and Alexander Donski 5–7, 6–4, [10–7] in the final.

== Seeds ==
1. (United States) George Goldhoff / (United States) Trey Hilderbrand (semifinals)
2. (Peru) Alexander Merino / (Germany) Christoph Negritu (semifinals)
3. (Tunisia) Skander Mansouri / (Tunisia) Aziz Ouakaa (first round)
4. (New Zealand) Finn Reynolds / (New Zealand) James Watt (quarterfinals)

== Draw ==
Key

- Q = Qualifier
- WC = Wild card
- LL = Lucky loser
- Alt = Alternate
- ITF = ITF entry
- PR = Protected ranking
- SR = Special ranking
- SE = Special exempt
- JE = Junior exempt
- JR = Junior Accelerator Programme entrant
- CO = College Accelerator Programme entrant
- NG = Next Gen Accelerator Program entrant
- w/o = Walkover
- r = Retired
- d = Defaulted

=== Draw ===
First round
1	(United States) G Goldhoff (United States) T Hilderbrand	6	6
(Italy) E Dalla Valle (France) C Denolly	3	3
(Spain) B Pujol Navarro (Canada) K Stevenson	6^{9}	2
Alt	(Switzerland) K Feldbausch (Mexico) R Pacheco Méndez	7^{11}	3^{r}
4	(New Zealand) F Reynolds (New Zealand) J Watt	6	6
(Bulgaria) A Genov (Netherlands) T Loof	2	3
(Czech Republic) D Poljak (Germany) T Rühl	6	1	[7]
(Czech Republic) H Bartoň (Czech Republic) M Vrbenský	4	6	[10]
(India) S Banthia (Bulgaria) A Donski	6	6
WC	(Tunisia) Omar Knani (Tunisia) Alaa Trifi	1	2
(Romania) FC Jianu (Spain) O Roca Batalla	6	6
3	(Tunisia) S Mansouri (Tunisia) A Ouakaa	1	1
Alt	(France) R Bertrand (India) A Kalyanpur	3	6	[11]
(Romania) A Jecan (Romania) B Pavel	6	3	[9]
(France) A Reymond (France) L Sanchez	5	4
2	(Peru) A Merino (Germany) C Negritu	7	6

Quarterfinals
1	(United States) G Goldhoff (United States) T Hilderbrand	6	6
(Spain) B Pujol Navarro (Canada) K Stevenson	4	2
4	(New Zealand) F Reynolds (New Zealand) J Watt	6^{1}	6^{5}
(Czech Republic) H Bartoň (Czech Republic) M Vrbenský	7^{7}	7^{7}
(India) S Banthia (Bulgaria) A Donski	w/o
(Romania) FC Jianu (Spain) O Roca Batalla
Alt	(France) R Bertrand (India) A Kalyanpur	0	6^{6}
2	(Peru) A Merino (Germany) C Negritu	6	7^{8}

Semifinals
1	(United States) G Goldhoff (United States) T Hilderbrand	6^{10}	4
(Czech Republic) H Bartoň (Czech Republic) M Vrbenský	7^{12}	6
(India) S Banthia (Bulgaria) A Donski	6	7^{8}
2	(Peru) A Merino (Germany) C Negritu	2	6^{6}

Final
(Czech Republic) H Bartoň (Czech Republic) M Vrbenský	5	6	[10]
(India) S Banthia (Bulgaria) A Donski	7	4	[7]
