= 2022 Tunis Open – Singles =

Singles
- 2022 Tunis Open

Final
- Champion: (Spain) Roberto Carballés Baena
- Runner-up: (Netherlands) Gijs Brouwer
- Score: 6–1, 6–1

Events
Singles	Doubles
- Tunis Open

Pablo Cuevas was the defending champion but chose not to participate.

Roberto Carballés Baena won the title after defeating Gijs Brouwer 6–1, 6–1 in the final.

== Seeds ==
1. (Australia) Jordan Thompson (second round)
2. (Spain) Roberto Carballés Baena (champion)
3. (Spain) Javier Barranco Cosano (first round)
4. (Portugal) Frederico Ferreira Silva (quarterfinals)
5. (Netherlands) Jelle Sels (second round)
6. (Germany) Nicola Kuhn (quarterfinals)
7. (China) Zhang Zhizhen (semifinals)
8. (Belgium) Kimmer Coppejans (first round)

== Draw ==
Key

- Q = Qualifier
- WC = Wild card
- LL = Lucky loser
- Alt = Alternate
- ITF = ITF entry
- PR = Protected ranking
- SR = Special ranking
- SE = Special exempt
- JE = Junior exempt
- JR = Junior Accelerator Programme entrant
- CO = College Accelerator Programme entrant
- NG = Next Gen Accelerator Program entrant
- w/o = Walkover
- r = Retired
- d = Defaulted

=== Finals ===
Semifinals
(Austria) Filip Misolic	2	2
(Netherlands) Gijs Brouwer	6	6
7	(China) Zhang Zhizhen	2	1
2	(Spain) Roberto Carballés Baena	6	6

Final
(Netherlands) Gijs Brouwer	1	1
2	(Spain) Roberto Carballés Baena	6	6

=== Top half ===
First round
1	(Australia) J Thompson	6	6
Q	(Switzerland) R Bertola	1	4
(Austria) L Miedler	2	6	1
(Austria) F Misolic	6	3	6
Alt	(Serbia) P Krstin	4	0
(Poland) D Michalski	6	6
Alt	(France) C Hemery	4	1
6	(Germany) N Kuhn	6	6
3	(Spain) J Barranco Cosano	4	5
(France) M Janvier	6	7
(Netherlands) G Brouwer	7^{7}	6
Q	(Bosnia and Herzegovina) A Šetkić	6^{3}	3
(Spain) O Roca Batalla	6	6
Q	(United Kingdom) F Gill	1	4
Q	(Austria) A Erler	7^{7}	7^{7}
8	(Belgium) K Coppejans	6^{5}	6^{1}

Second round
1	(Australia) J Thompson	7^{7}	6^{7}	1
(Austria) F Misolic	6^{5}	7^{9}	6
(Poland) D Michalski	2	6^{1}
6	(Germany) N Kuhn	6	7^{7}
(France) M Janvier	4	6^{2}
(Netherlands) G Brouwer	6	7^{7}
(Spain) O Roca Batalla	7	7^{7}
Q	(Austria) A Erler	5	6^{2}

Quarterfinals
(Austria) F Misolic	6	6
6	(Germany) N Kuhn	3	4
(Netherlands) G Brouwer	6	6
(Spain) O Roca Batalla	4	3

Semifinals
(Austria) F Misolic	2	2
(Netherlands) G Brouwer	6	6

=== Bottom half ===
First round
7	(China) Zh Zhang	6	6
(Belgium) R Bemelmans	3	1
(Spain) N Sánchez Izquierdo	6	2	7
A Vatutin	3	6	5
Q	(Spain) M Damas	4	2
Q	(Spain) C Sánchez Jover	6	6
WC	(Tunisia) S Mansouri	4	2
4	(Portugal) F Ferreira Silva	6	6
5	(Netherlands) J Sels	4	6	6
Alt	(Tunisia) M Jaziri	6	2	1
Alt	(Belgium) M Geerts	2	6	6
WC	(Tunisia) A Ouakaa	6	4	1
WC	(Tunisia) M Echargui	1	5
(Spain) Eduard Esteve Lobato	6	7
(Italy) R Brancaccio	7^{7}	0	1
2	(Spain) R Carballés Baena	6^{5}	6	6

Second round
7	(China) Zh Zhang	6	7
(Spain) N Sánchez Izquierdo	3	5
Q	(Spain) C Sánchez Jover	3	6^{6}
4	(Portugal) F Ferreira Silva	6	7^{8}
5	(Netherlands) J Sels	1	6	3
Alt	(Belgium) M Geerts	6	4	6
(Spain) E Esteve Lobato	1	1
2	(Spain) R Carballés Baena	6	6

Quarterfinals
7	(China) Zh Zhang	7	6
4	(Portugal) F Ferreira Silva	5	3
Alt	(Belgium) M Geerts	5	1
2	(Spain) R Carballés Baena	7	6

Semifinals
7	(China) Zh Zhang	2	1
2	(Spain) R Carballés Baena	6	6
