= 2013 Tunis Open =

- Date: 29 April – 5 May
- Edition: 8th
- Draw: 32S / 16D
- Prize money: $125,000+H
- Surface: Clay
- Location: Tunis, Tunisia

Champions

Singles
- (Romania) Adrian Ungur

Doubles
- (Germany) Dominik Meffert / (Austria) Philipp Oswald
| ← 2012 · | Tunis Open | · 2014 → |

The 2013 Tunis Open was a professional tennis tournament played on clay courts. It was the eighth edition of the tournament which was part of the 2013 ATP Challenger Tour. It took place in Tunis, Tunisia between 29 April and 5 May 2013.

== Singles main draw entrants ==
=== Seeds ===
| Country | Player | Rank^{1} | Seed |
|---|---|---|---|
| ESP | Marcel Granollers | 36 | 1 |
| ESP | Guillermo García López | 87 | 2 |
| GER | Benjamin Becker | 92 | 3 |
| FRA | Kenny de Schepper | 102 | 4 |
| ESP | Rubén Ramírez Hidalgo | 103 | 5 |
| ESP | Daniel Muñoz de la Nava | 125 | 6 |
| ITA | Matteo Viola | 127 | 7 |
| ITA | Flavio Cipolla | 133 | 8 |

- ^{1} Rankings are as of April 22, 2013.

=== Other entrants ===
The following players received wildcards into the singles main draw:

- (Tunisia) Mohamed Haythem Abid
- (Spain) Marcel Granollers
- (Tunisia) Skander Mansouri
- (Algeria) Lamine Ouahab

The following player received entry using a protected ranking:

- (France) Laurent Rochette

The following players received entry from the qualifying draw:

- (Italy) Andrea Arnaboldi
- (Austria) Michael Linzer
- (Spain) Enrique López Pérez
- (France) Florian Reynet

The following player received entry as a lucky loser:

- (Italy) Riccardo Ghedin

== Doubles main draw entrants ==
=== Seeds ===
| Country | Player | Country | Player | Rank^{1} | Seed |
|---|---|---|---|---|---|
| USA | James Cerretani | CAN | Adil Shamasdin | 158 | 1 |
| GBR | Jamie Delgado | SWE | Andreas Siljeström | 201 | 2 |
| ESP | Gerard Granollers | ESP | Marcel Granollers | 242 | 3 |
| AUS | Rameez Junaid | ESP | Adrián Menéndez Maceiras | 259 | 4 |

- ^{1} Rankings as of April 22, 2013.

=== Other entrants ===
The following pairs received wildcards into the doubles main draw:

- (Tunisia) Mehdi Abid / (Tunisia) Ameur Ben Hassen
- (Tunisia) Skander Mansouri / (Algeria) Lamine Ouahab
- (France) Julien Obry / (France) Florian Reynet

The following pair received entry using a protected ranking:

- (France) Laurent Rochette / (Argentina) Diego Schwartzman

The following pair received entry as an alternate:

- (Spain) Arnau Brugués Davi / (Spain) Enrique López Pérez

== Champions ==
=== Singles ===
- (Romania) Adrian Ungur def. (Argentina) Diego Sebastián Schwartzman, 4–6, 6–0, 6–2

=== Doubles ===
- (Germany) Dominik Meffert / (Austria) Philipp Oswald def. (United Kingdom) Jamie Delgado / (Sweden) Andreas Siljeström, 3–6, 7–6^{(7–0)}, [10–7]
