= 2024 Tunis Open – Singles =

Singles
- 2024 Tunis Open

Final
- Champion: (Spain) Oriol Roca Batalla
- Runner-up: (France) Valentin Royer
- Score: 7–6^{(7–5)}, 7–5

Events
Singles	Doubles
- Tunis Open

Sho Shimabukuro was the defending champion but lost in the second round to Clément Tabur.

Oriol Roca Batalla won the title after defeating Valentin Royer 7–6^{(7–5)}, 7–5 in the final.

== Seeds ==
1. (Monaco) Valentin Vacherot (semifinals)
2. (Bosnia and Herzegovina) Damir Džumhur (semifinals)
3. (France) Titouan Droguet (withdrew)
4. (Netherlands) Jesper de Jong (first round)
5. (Japan) Sho Shimabukuro (second round)
6. (France) Benjamin Bonzi (first round)
7. (Italy) Stefano Travaglia (first round)
8. (Argentina) Genaro Alberto Olivieri (quarterfinals)

== Draw ==
Key

- Q = Qualifier
- WC = Wild card
- LL = Lucky loser
- Alt = Alternate
- ITF = ITF entry
- PR = Protected ranking
- SR = Special ranking
- SE = Special exempt
- JE = Junior exempt
- JR = Junior Accelerator Programme entrant
- CO = College Accelerator Programme entrant
- NG = Next Gen Accelerator Program entrant
- w/o = Walkover
- r = Retired
- d = Defaulted

=== Finals ===
Semifinals
1	(Monaco) Valentin Vacherot	6^{5}	4
(France) Valentin Royer	7^{7}	6
(Spain) Oriol Roca Batalla	6	7^{7}
2	(Bosnia and Herzegovina) Damir Džumhur	3	6^{5}

Final
(France) Valentin Royer	6^{5}	5
(Spain) Oriol Roca Batalla	7^{7}	7

=== Top half ===
First round
1	(Monaco) V Vacherot	6	6
WC	(Georgia (country)) N Basilashvili	1	4
Q	(Italy) Alexander Weis	4	2
(Dominican Republic) N Hardt	6	6
Q	(United Kingdom) F Gill	5	3
Alt	(Netherlands) G Brouwer	7	6
Q	(Kazakhstan) T Skatov	5	6	6
6	(France) B Bonzi	7	3	2
4	(Netherlands) J de Jong	3	7	4
(France) V Royer	6	5	6
(France) M Janvier	6^{3}	4
Alt	(Tunisia) A Dougaz	7^{7}	6
WC	(Tunisia) A Ouakaa	2	3
(United Kingdom) O Crawford	6	6
(Cyprus) M Efstathiou	0	0^{r}
8	(Argentina) GA Olivieri	6	2

Second round
1	(Monaco) V Vacherot	6	6
(Dominican Republic) N Hardt	1	1
Alt	(Netherlands) G Brouwer	2	3
Q	(Kazakhstan) T Skatov	6	6
(France) V Royer	6	5	7
Alt	(Tunisia) A Dougaz	4	7	5
(United Kingdom) O Crawford	6	5	3
8	(Argentina) GA Olivieri	3	7	6

Quarterfinals
1	(Monaco) V Vacherot	6	6
Q	(Kazakhstan) T Skatov	1	2
(France) V Royer	6	6
8	(Argentina) GA Olivieri	1	2

Semifinals
1	(Monaco) V Vacherot	6^{5}	4
(France) V Royer	7^{7}	6

=== Bottom half ===
First round
7	(Italy) S Travaglia	7	3	1
(Bolivia) M Dellien	5	6	6
Alt	(United States) M Krueger	7^{7}	6
(Austria) F Misolic	6^{3}	4
(Estonia) M Lajal	3	6	6^{7}
(Spain) O Roca Batalla	6	3	7^{9}
(United Kingdom) B Harris	5	2
LL	(France) T Lamasine	7	6
5	(Japan) S Shimabukuro	6	6
Q	(South Korea) G Campaña Lee	4	4
(France) C Tabur	7^{9}	6
Q	(Italy) M Cecchinato	6^{7}	4
WC	(Spain) M Landaluce	6	3	7^{7}
(France) C Hemery	3	6	6^{5}
Q	(Czech Republic) M Vrbenský	5	3
2	(Bosnia and Herzegovina) D Džumhur	7	6

Second round
(Bolivia) M Dellien	6	6
Alt	(United States) M Krueger	3	4
(Spain) O Roca Batalla	6	6
LL	(France) T Lamasine	2	3
5	(Japan) S Shimabukuro	2	6^{6}
(France) C Tabur	6	7^{8}
WC	(Spain) M Landaluce	0	6	4
2	(Bosnia and Herzegovina) D Džumhur	6	3	6

Quarterfinals
(Bolivia) M Dellien	6	0	4
(Spain) O Roca Batalla	4	6	6
(France) C Tabur	5	6	2
2	(Bosnia and Herzegovina) D Džumhur	7	3	6

Semifinals
(Spain) O Roca Batalla	6	7^{7}
2	(Bosnia and Herzegovina) D Džumhur	3	6^{5}
