= 2009 Tunis Open =

- Date: April 27 – March 3
- Edition: 5th
- Location: Tunis, Tunisia

Champions

Singles
- (Argentina) Gastón Gaudio

Doubles
- (Argentina) Brian Dabul / (Argentina) Leonardo Mayer
← 2008 ·	Tunis Open	· 2010 →

The 2009 Tunis Open was a professional tennis tournament played on outdoor red clay courts. It was part of the Tretorn SERIE+ of the 2009 ATP Challenger Tour. It took place in Tunis, Tunisia between April 27 and March 3, 2009.

== Singles entrants ==
=== Seeds ===
Nationality	Player	Ranking*	Seeding
FIN	Jarkko Nieminen	50	1
FRA	Nicolas Devilder	64	2
GER	Björn Phau	65	3
POR	Frederico Gil	75	4
ARG	Diego Junqueira	77	5
ESP	Pablo Andújar	91	6
USA	Wayne Odesnik	98	7
ARG	Leonardo Mayer	105	8

- Rankings are as of April 20, 2009.

=== Other entrants ===
The following players received wildcards into the singles main draw:

- (Argentina) Gastón Gaudio
- (Tunisia) Walid Jallali
- (Tunisia) Malek Jaziri
- (Romania) Adrian Ungur

The following players received entry from the qualifying draw:

- (Spain) Albert Ramos-Viñolas
- (France) Laurent Recouderc
- (Serbia) David Savić
- (Portugal) Pedro Sousa

== Champions ==
=== Men's singles ===
(Argentina) Gastón Gaudio def. (Portugal) Frederico Gil, 6–2, 1–6, 6–3

=== Men's doubles ===
(Argentina) Brian Dabul / (Argentina) Leonardo Mayer def. (Sweden) Johan Brunström / (Netherlands Antilles) Jean-Julien Rojer, 6–4, 7–6(6)
