= 2018 Tunis Open – Doubles =

Doubles
- 2018 Tunis Open

Final
- Champions: (Ukraine) Denys Molchanov (Slovakia) Igor Zelenay
- Runners-up: (France) Jonathan Eysseric (United Kingdom) Joe Salisbury
- Score: 7–6^{(7–4)}, 6–2

Events
Singles	Doubles
- Tunis Open

Pierre-Hugues Herbert and Adil Shamasdin were the defending champions but only Shamasdin chose to defend his title, partnering Sander Arends. Shamasdin lost in the quarterfinals to Dennis Novak and Tristan-Samuel Weissborn.

Denys Molchanov and Igor Zelenay won the title after defeating Jonathan Eysseric and Joe Salisbury 7–6^{(7–4)}, 6–2 in the final.

== Seeds ==
1. (Brazil) Marcelo Demoliner / (Sweden) Robert Lindstedt (quarterfinals)
2. (Czech Republic) Roman Jebavý / (Romania) Florin Mergea (quarterfinals)
3. (Netherlands) Sander Arends / (Canada) Adil Shamasdin (quarterfinals)
4. (Argentina) Guillermo Durán / (Argentina) Máximo González (first round)

== Draw ==
Key

- Q = Qualifier
- WC = Wild card
- LL = Lucky loser
- Alt = Alternate
- ITF = ITF entry
- PR = Protected ranking
- SR = Special ranking
- SE = Special exempt
- JE = Junior exempt
- JR = Junior Accelerator Programme entrant
- CO = College Accelerator Programme entrant
- NG = Next Gen Accelerator Program entrant
- w/o = Walkover
- r = Retired
- d = Defaulted

First round
1	(Brazil) M Demoliner (Sweden) R Lindstedt	6	7
WC	(Italy) J Ocleppo (Italy) A Vavassori	4	5
(Portugal) J Domingues (Portugal) G Oliveira	4	7	[7]
(Belgium) S Gillé (Belgium) J Vliegen	6	5	[10]
4	(Argentina) G Durán (Argentina) M González	6	2	[7]
(United Kingdom) L Broady (United Kingdom) S Clayton	2	6	[10]
WC	(Tunisia) M Echargui (Australia) A Popyrin	4	2
(Ukraine) D Molchanov (Slovakia) I Zelenay	6	6
(Portugal) G Elias (Portugal) P Sousa	3	2
(Austria) D Novak (Austria) T-S Weissborn	6	6
WC	(Tunisia) Mohamed Ali Bellalouna (Tunisia) Adam Nagoudi	3	2
3	(Netherlands) S Arends (Canada) A Shamasdin	6	6
(Germany) A Mies (Ukraine) V Uzhylovskyi	5	3
(France) J Eysseric (United Kingdom) J Salisbury	7	6
(Spain) P Martínez (Spain) D Vega Hernández	2	3
2	(Czech Republic) R Jebavý (Romania) F Mergea	6	6

Quarterfinals
1	(Brazil) M Demoliner (Sweden) R Lindstedt	6^{6}	3
(Belgium) S Gillé (Belgium) J Vliegen	7^{8}	6
(United Kingdom) L Broady (United Kingdom) S Clayton	4	1
(Ukraine) D Molchanov (Slovakia) I Zelenay	6	6
(Austria) D Novak (Austria) T-S Weissborn	7	6
3	(Netherlands) S Arends (Canada) A Shamasdin	5	4
(France) J Eysseric (United Kingdom) J Salisbury	7	6
2	(Czech Republic) R Jebavý (Romania) F Mergea	5	3

Semifinals
(Belgium) S Gillé (Belgium) J Vliegen	4	6	[3]
(Ukraine) D Molchanov (Slovakia) I Zelenay	6	4	[10]
(Austria) D Novak (Austria) T-S Weissborn	4	3
(France) J Eysseric (United Kingdom) J Salisbury	6	6

Final
(Ukraine) D Molchanov (Slovakia) I Zelenay	7^{7}	6
(France) J Eysseric (United Kingdom) J Salisbury	6^{4}	2
