= 2013 Tunis Open – Singles =

Singles
- 2013 Tunis Open

Final
- Champion: (Romania) Adrian Ungur
- Runner-up: (Argentina) Diego Sebastián Schwartzman
- Score: 4–6, 6–0, 6–2

Events
Singles	Doubles
- Tunis Open

Rubén Ramírez Hidalgo was the defending champion, but lost to Diego Sebastián Schwartzman in the first round.
Adrian Ungur defeated Schwartzman 4–6, 6–0, 6–2 in the final to win the title.

== Seeds ==
1. (Spain) Marcel Granollers (second round, retired)
2. (Spain) Guillermo García-López (withdrew due to an infection)
3. (Germany) Benjamin Becker (first round)
4. (France) Kenny de Schepper (semifinals)
5. (Spain) Rubén Ramírez Hidalgo (first round, retired due to general exhaustion)
6. (Spain) Daniel Muñoz de la Nava (second round)
7. (Italy) Matteo Viola (first round, retired due to a low back injury)
8. (Italy) Flavio Cipolla (second round)

== Draw ==
Key

- Q = Qualifier
- WC = Wild card
- LL = Lucky loser
- Alt = Alternate
- ITF = ITF entry
- PR = Protected ranking
- SR = Special ranking
- SE = Special exempt
- JE = Junior exempt
- JR = Junior Accelerator Programme entrant
- CO = College Accelerator Programme entrant
- NG = Next Gen Accelerator Program entrant
- w/o = Walkover
- r = Retired
- d = Defaulted

=== Finals ===
Semifinals
(Argentina) Diego Sebastián Schwartzman	7^{9}	6
4	(France) Kenny de Schepper	6^{7}	1
(Romania) Adrian Ungur	2	6	7
(France) Florent Serra	6	1	5

Final
(Argentina) Diego Sebastián Schwartzman	6	0	2
(Romania) Adrian Ungur	4	6	6

=== Top half ===
First round
1/WC	(Spain) M Granollers	6	6
(Spain) A Brugués-Davi	4	2
(France) N Mahut	3	6^{3}
WC	(Algeria) L Ouahab	6	7^{7}
Q	(France) Florian Reynet	4	1
(Spain) A Menéndez-Maceiras	6	6
(Argentina) DS Schwartzman	6	5
5	(Spain) R Ramírez Hidalgo	4	2^{r}
4	(France) K de Schepper	4	7^{8}	6
(Spain) G Granollers	6	6^{6}	1
(Uzbekistan) F Dustov	6^{6}	7	3
(Italy) A di Mauro	7^{8}	5	6
Q	(Italy) A Arnaboldi	7	6^{7}	6
(Germany) D Meffert	5	7^{9}	3
Q	(Spain) E López-Pérez	3	2
6	(Spain) D Muñoz de la Nava	6	6

Second round
1/WC	(Spain) M Granollers	6	2	0^{r}
WC	(Algeria) L Ouahab	4	6	3
(Spain) A Menéndez-Maceiras	6	5	0
(Argentina) DS Schwartzman	4	7	6
4	(France) K de Schepper	7^{7}	6
(Italy) A di Mauro	6^{2}	0
Q	(Italy) A Arnaboldi	6^{3}	6	7^{7}
6	(Spain) D Muñoz de la Nava	7^{7}	1	6^{3}

Quarterfinals
WC	(Algeria) L Ouahab	2	6^{7}
(Argentina) DS Schwartzman	6	7^{9}
4	(France) K de Schepper	7^{7}	6
Q	(Italy) A Arnaboldi	6^{5}	1

Semifinals
(Argentina) DS Schwartzman	7^{9}	6
4	(France) K de Schepper	6^{7}	1

=== Bottom half ===
First round
7	(Italy) M Viola	6	6^{2}	3^{r}
(Ukraine) I Sergeyev	4	7^{7}	5
(Romania) A Ungur	7	6
(Serbia) B Pašanski	5	0
(Turkey) M İlhan	6^{5}	6	3
(Moldova) R Albot	7^{7}	3	6
(Tunisia) M Jaziri	6	6
3	(Germany) B Becker	1	4
8	(Italy) F Cipolla	6	6
WC	(Tunisia) Mohamed Haythem Abid	1	3
WC	(Tunisia) S Mansouri	4	6	1
(Ukraine) O Nedovyesov	6	3	6
Q	(Austria) M Linzer	6^{4}	3
(France) F Serra	7^{7}	6
PR	(France) Laurent Rochette	1	5
LL	(Italy) R Ghedin	6	7

Second round
(Ukraine) I Sergeyev	1	2
(Romania) A Ungur	6	6
(Moldova) R Albot	6	6
(Tunisia) M Jaziri	1	4
8	(Italy) F Cipolla	6^{3}	3
(Ukraine) O Nedovyesov	7^{7}	6
(France) F Serra	7	6
LL	(Italy) R Ghedin	5	3

Quarterfinals
(Romania) A Ungur	7	7^{7}
(Moldova) R Albot	5	6^{4}
(Ukraine) O Nedovyesov	6^{5}	4
(France) F Serra	7^{7}	6

Semifinals
(Romania) A Ungur	2	6	7
(France) F Serra	6	1	5
