= 2010 Tunis Open =

- Date: April 26 – May 2, 2010
- Edition: 6th
- Location: Tunis, Tunisia

Champions

Singles
- (Argentina) José Acasuso

Doubles
- (South Africa) Jeff Coetzee / (Belgium) Kristof Vliegen
← 2009 ·	Tunis Open	· 2011 →

The 2010 Tunis Open was a professional tennis tournament played on red clay courts. It was part of the Tretorn SERIE+ of the 2010 ATP Challenger Tour. It took place in Tunis, Tunisia between April 26 and May 2, 2010.

== ATP entrants ==
=== Seeds ===
Nationality	Player	Ranking*	Seeding
FRA	Florent Serra	62	1
FRA	Arnaud Clément	75	2
UKR	Illya Marchenko	79	3
GER	Daniel Brands	87	4
RUS	Igor Kunitsyn	106	5
POR	Rui Machado	116	6
POR	Frederico Gil	120	7
BEL	Christophe Rochus	122	8

- Rankings are as of April 19, 2010.

=== Other entrants ===
The following players received wildcards into the singles main draw:

- (Morocco) Reda El Amrani
- (Tunisia) Malek Jaziri
- (Germany) Nicolas Kiefer
- (Morocco) Mehdi Ziadi

The following players received entry from the qualifying draw:

- (Spain) Iñigo Cervantes-Huegun
- (Serbia) Boris Pašanski
- (Portugal) João Sousa
- (Germany) Peter Torebko

== Champions ==
=== Singles ===
(Argentina) José Acasuso def. (Germany) Daniel Brands, 6–3, 6–4

=== Doubles ===
(South Africa) Jeff Coetzee / (Belgium) Kristof Vliegen def. (United States) James Cerretani / (Canada) Adil Shamasdin, 7–6(3), 6–3
