= 2018 Tunis Open – Singles =

Singles
- 2018 Tunis Open

Final
- Champion: (Argentina) Guido Andreozzi
- Runner-up: (Spain) Daniel Gimeno Traver
- Score: 6–2, 3–0 ret.

Events
Singles	Doubles
- Tunis Open

Simone Bolelli was the defending champion but chose not to defend his title.

Guido Andreozzi won the title after Daniel Gimeno Traver retired trailing 2–6, 0–3 in the final.

== Seeds ==
1. (Czech Republic) Jiří Veselý (withdrew)
2. (Georgia (country)) Nikoloz Basilashvili (quarterfinals)
3. (Tunisia) Malek Jaziri (first round)
4. (Moldova) Radu Albot (first round)
5. (Italy) Thomas Fabbiano (semifinals)
6. (Portugal) Gastão Elias (second round)
7. (Portugal) Pedro Sousa (quarterfinals, retired)
8. (Sweden) Elias Ymer (first round)

== Draw ==
Key

- Q = Qualifier
- WC = Wild card
- LL = Lucky loser
- Alt = Alternate
- ITF = ITF entry
- PR = Protected ranking
- SR = Special ranking
- SE = Special exempt
- JE = Junior exempt
- JR = Junior Accelerator Programme entrant
- CO = College Accelerator Programme entrant
- NG = Next Gen Accelerator Program entrant
- w/o = Walkover
- r = Retired
- d = Defaulted

=== Finals ===
Semifinals
5	(Italy) Thomas Fabbiano	1	4
Q	(Spain) Daniel Gimeno Traver	6	6
(Portugal) João Domingues	7	5	3
(Argentina) Guido Andreozzi	5	7	6

Final
Q	(Spain) Daniel Gimeno Traver	2	0^{r}
(Argentina) Guido Andreozzi	6	3

=== Top half ===
First round
LL	(Germany) D Masur	3
WC	(Morocco) L Ouahab	0^{r}
(France) C Moutet	7^{7}	6
(United Kingdom) L Broady	6^{4}	3
Q	(France) M Janvier	6	6
(Norway) C Ruud	4	4
Q	(Hungary) Z Piros	2	6^{4}
5	(Italy) T Fabbiano	6	7^{7}
4	(Moldova) R Albot	1	1
(France) B Bonzi	6	6
Q	(Czech Republic) L Rosol	7	0
(Spain) C Taberner	5	0^{r}
(Austria) D Novak	4	7	1
Q	(Spain) D Gimeno Traver	6	5	6
(Portugal) G Oliveira	2	2
6	(Portugal) G Elias	6	6

Second round
LL	(Germany) D Masur	1	6	3
(France) C Moutet	6	4	6
Q	(France) M Janvier	6	6^{5}	3
5	(Italy) T Fabbiano	3	7^{7}	6
(France) B Bonzi	4	6	3
Q	(Czech Republic) L Rosol	6	3	6
Q	(Spain) D Gimeno Traver	4	6	7^{7}
6	(Portugal) G Elias	6	3	6^{2}

Quarterfinals
(France) C Moutet	5	2
5	(Italy) T Fabbiano	7	6
Q	(Czech Republic) L Rosol	1	2
Q	(Spain) D Gimeno Traver	6	6

Semifinals
5	(Italy) T Fabbiano	1	4
Q	(Spain) D Gimeno Traver	6	6

=== Bottom half ===
First round
7	(Portugal) P Sousa	6	4	6
(Austria) S Ofner	3	6	2
WC	(Tunisia) M Echargui	3	6^{3}
(Estonia) J Zopp	6	7^{7}
(Portugal) J Domingues	6	6
WC	(Tunisia) Mohamed Ali Bellalouna	0	0
(Slovakia) J Kovalík	6	7^{7}
3	(Tunisia) M Jaziri	4	6^{5}
8	(Sweden) E Ymer	5	3
(Belarus) E Gerasimov	7	6
(Argentina) G Andreozzi	6	7
(Italy) S Napolitano	2	5
WC	(Australia) A Popyrin	4	7^{7}	6
(Serbia) N Milojević	6	6^{4}	3
(Germany) T Kamke	4	3
2/SE	(Georgia (country)) N Basilashvili	6	6

Second round
7	(Portugal) P Sousa	6	6
(Estonia) J Zopp	2	2
(Portugal) J Domingues	6	7
(Slovakia) J Kovalík	4	5
(Belarus) E Gerasimov	4	3
(Argentina) G Andreozzi	6	6
WC	(Australia) A Popyrin	5	4
2/SE	(Georgia (country)) N Basilashvili	7	6

Quarterfinals
7	(Portugal) P Sousa	6	1^{r}
(Portugal) J Domingues	4	3
(Argentina) G Andreozzi	6	6
2/SE	(Georgia (country)) N Basilashvili	1	2

Semifinals
(Portugal) J Domingues	7	5	3
(Argentina) G Andreozzi	5	7	6
