= 2002 ATP Challenger Series =

Tennis tour

Details
- Duration: 31 December 2001 – 8 December 2002
- Edition: 25th
- Tournaments: 122

Achievements (singles)

The ATP Challenger Series is the second tier tour for professional tennis organised by the Association of Tennis Professionals (ATP). The 2002 ATP Challenger Series calendar comprised 122 tournaments, with prize money ranging from $25,000 up to $150,000.

== Schedule ==
=== January ===
Date	Country	Tournament	Prizemoney	Surface	Singles champion	Doubles champions
31.12. 2001	Brazil	Aberto de São Paulo	$ 25,000	Hard	(Canada) Frédéric Niemeyer	(United States) Brandon Coupe (Canada) Frédéric Niemeyer
21.01.	Germany	Heilbronn Open	$ 100,000	Carpet (i)	(Germany) Alexander Popp	(North Macedonia) Aleksandar Kitinov (Sweden) Johan Landsberg
21.01.	United States	Hilton Waikoloa Village USTA Challenger	$ 50,000	Hard	(United States) James Blake	(Romania) Gabriel Trifu (United States) Glenn Weiner
28.01.	France	Internationaux de Tennis de Brest	$ 100,000	Hard (i)	(Georgia (country)) Irakli Labadze	(Australia) Ben Ellwood (Australia) Stephen Huss
28.01.	United States	Challenger of Dallas	$ 50,000	Hard (i)	(United States) Jeff Morrison	(Italy) Giorgio Galimberti (Canada) Frédéric Niemeyer
28.01.	Germany	Warsteiner Challenger Lübeck	$ 25,000	Carpet (i)	(Netherlands) Raemon Sluiter	(France) Grégory Carraz (France) Nicolas Mahut

=== February ===
Date	Country	Tournament	Prizemoney	Surface	Singles champion	Doubles champions
04.02.	Poland	KGHM Polish Indoors	$ 150,000	Hard (i)	(Italy) Davide Sanguinetti	(Australia) Ben Ellwood (Australia) Stephen Huss
04.02.	United States	Joplin Challenger	$ 50,000	Hard (i)	(United States) Jack Brasington	(United States) Justin Gimelstob (United States) Scott Humphries
04.02.	Serbia	Belgrade Challenger	$ 25,000	Carpet (i)	(Croatia) Mario Ančić	(Federal Republic of Yugoslavia) Dušan Vemić (Croatia) Lovro Zovko
04.02.	Germany	Volkswagen Challenger	$ 25,000	Carpet (i)	(Germany) Jakub Herm-Záhlava	(Czech Republic) Jan Hernych (South Africa) Shaun Rudman
18.02.	France	Challenger 42	$ 75,000	Hard (i)	(Austria) Julian Knowle	(Austria) Julian Knowle (Austria) Jürgen Melzer
18.02.	Great Britain	Hull Challenger	$ 25,000	Carpet (i)	(Russia) Denis Golovanov	(Germany) Michael Kohlmann (France) Michaël Llodra
25.02.	Vietnam	Heineken Challenger	$ 50,000	Hard	(Japan) Takao Suzuki	(Israel) Amir Hadad (Austria) Alexander Peya
25.02.	France	Challenger Ford de Cherbourg-Octeville	$ 37.500	Hard (i)	(France) Lionel Roux	(Israel) Noam Behr (Israel) Jonathan Erlich
25.02.	Germany	Warsteiner Challenger	$ 25,000	Carpet (i)	(Netherlands) Raemon Sluiter	(The Bahamas) Mark Merklein (South Africa) Paul Rosner

=== March ===
Date	Country	Tournament	Prizemoney	Surface	Singles champion	Doubles champions
04.03.	Japan	Shimadzu All Japan Indoor Tennis Championships	$ 25,000	Carpet (i)	(Japan) Takao Suzuki	(Finland) Tuomas Ketola (Germany) Alexander Waske
04.03.	Germany	Residenza Open Magdeburg	$ 25,000	Carpet (i)	(Belgium) Dick Norman	(Germany) Franz Stauder (Ukraine) Orest Tereshchuk
11.03.	United States	North Miami Beach Challenger	$ 50,000	Hard	(United States) Vince Spadea	(United States) Eric Nunez (United States) Graydon Oliver
11.03.	Australia	Gosford Challenger	$ 25,000	Hard	(South Africa) Louis Vosloo	(Switzerland) Yves Allegro (South Africa) Justin Bower
11.03.	Japan	Osaka Challenger	$ 25,000	Hard	(Japan) Takao Suzuki	(Slovakia) Karol Beck (France) Cedric Kauffmann
11.03.	Ecuador	Abierto Internacional de Salinas	$ 25,000	Hard	(Peru) Iván Miranda	(United States) Brandon Coupe (United States) Jeff Salzenstein
18.03.	New Zealand	Hamilton Challenger	$ 25,000	Hard	(United States) Brian Vahaly	(Australia) Jaymon Crabb (Australia) Peter Luczak
18.03.	Italy	Olbia Challenger	$ 25,000	Clay	(Spain) Didac Pérez	(Italy) Filippo Messori (Italy) Vincenzo Santopadre
25.03.	Mexico	San Luis Potosí Challenger	$ 50,000	Clay	(Belgium) Dick Norman	(Belgium) Dick Norman (Bulgaria) Orlin Stanoytchev
25.03.	Italy	Torneo Internazionale di Tennis Città della Disfida Open	$ 25,000	Clay	(Spain) Sergi Bruguera	(Italy) Massimo Bertolini (Italy) Cristian Brandi

=== April ===
Date	Country	Tournament	Prizemoney	Surface	Singles champion	Doubles champions
01.04.	Tunisia	TCT Open	$ 75,000	Clay	(Netherlands) Raemon Sluiter	(Spain) Álex López Morón (Argentina) Andrés Schneiter
01.04.	United States	Tarzana Challenger	$ 50,000	Hard	(United States) Eric Taino	(Switzerland) George Bastl (South Africa) Neville Godwin
01.04.	Mexico	León Challenger	$ 25,000	Hard	(Germany) Alexander Waske	(Israel) Noam Behr (Czech Republic) Ota Fukárek
08.04.	United States	USTA Challenger of Calabasas	$ 50,000	Hard	(United States) Michael Chang	(South Africa) Paul Rosner (United States) Glenn Weiner
08.04.	Italy	San Remo Challenger	$ 25,000	Clay	(Germany) Oliver Gross	(Italy) Daniele Bracciali (Italy) Giorgio Galimberti
15.04.	Bermuda	XL Bermuda Open	$ 100,000	Clay	(Brazil) Flávio Saretta	(Switzerland) George Bastl (South Africa) Neville Godwin
22.04.	Italy	Naples Challenger	$ 25,000	Clay	(Spain) David Ferrer	(Romania) Gabriel Trifu (Belarus) Vladimir Voltchkov
29.04.	Italy	Rome Challenger	$ 25,000	Clay	(Argentina) Martín Vassallo Argüello	(Romania) Gabriel Trifu (Belarus) Vladimir Voltchkov

=== May ===
Date	Country	Tournament	Prizemoney	Surface	Singles champion	Doubles champions
06.05.	United States	Birmingham Challenger	$ 50,000	Clay	(United States) Alex Kim	(United States) Mardy Fish (United States) Jeff Morrison
06.05.	Great Britain	Edinburgh Challenger	$ 25,000	Clay	(Brazil) Alexandre Simoni	(South Africa) Jeff Coetzee (South Africa) Myles Wakefield
06.05.	Slovenia	Ljubljana Challenger	$ 25,000	Clay	(France) Arnaud Di Pasquale	(Argentina) Mariano Hood (Argentina) Edgardo Massa
13.05.	Czech Republic	ECM Prague Open	$ 50,000	Clay	(France) Olivier Patience	(Czech Republic) František Čermák (Czech Republic) Ota Fukárek
13.05.	Croatia	Zagreb Challenger	$ 50,000	Clay	(Peru) Luis Horna	(Belgium) Dick Norman (Belgium) Tom Vanhoudt
13.05.	Spain	Valencia Challenger	$ 37.500	Clay	(Spain) David Ferrer	(Australia) Tim Crichton (Australia) Todd Perry
13.05.	Uzbekistan	Fergana Challenger	$ 25,000	Hard	(Chinese Taipei) Jimmy Wang	(South Africa) Rik de Voest (South Africa) Dirk Stegmann
13.05.	United States	Rocky Mount Challenger	$ 25,000	Clay	(United States) Robby Ginepri	(The Bahamas) Mark Merklein (United States) Eric Taino
20.05.	Hungary	Budapest Challenger I	$ 25,000	Clay	(Argentina) Mariano Delfino	(Slovakia) Karol Beck (Czech Republic) Jaroslav Levinský
27.05.	Italy	Turin Challenger	$ 25,000	Clay	(Netherlands) Martin Verkerk	(Romania) Victor Hănescu (Spain) Óscar Hernández

=== June ===
Date	Country	Tournament	Prizemoney	Surface	Singles champion	Doubles champions
03.06.	Czech Republic	Unicredit Czech Open	$ 100,000	Clay	(Argentina) Guillermo Coria	(Czech Republic) František Čermák (Czech Republic) Ota Fukárek
03.06.	Germany	Schickedanz Open	$ 50,000	Clay	(Peru) Luis Horna	(Spain) Salvador Navarro (Spain) Gabriel Trujillo Soler
03.06.	Great Britain	Surbiton Trophy	$ 50,000	Grass	(United States) Jeff Morrison	(Brazil) André Sá (United States) Jim Thomas
03.06.	United States	Tallahassee Challenger	$ 50,000	Hard	(United States) Brian Vahaly	(United States) Levar Harper-Griffith (United States) Jeff Williams
10.06.	Italy	Biella Challenger	$ 100,000	Clay	(Slovakia) Dominik Hrbatý	(Italy) Giorgio Galimberti (Slovakia) Dominik Hrbatý
10.06.	Germany	ATU Cup	$ 50,000	Clay	(Peru) Luis Horna	(Germany) Jens Knippschild (Federal Republic of Yugoslavia) Dušan Vemić
17.06.	Germany	Nord/LB Open	$ 125,000	Clay	(Spain) David Sánchez	(Argentina) Mariano Hood (Peru) Luis Horna
17.06.	Switzerland	Lugano Challenger	$ 50,000	Clay	(Argentina) Guillermo Coria	(Spain) Emilio Benfele Álvarez (Italy) Giorgio Galimberti
24.06.	Andorra	Andorra Challenger	$ 25,000	Hard (i)	(Belgium) Dick Norman	(South Africa) Wesley Moodie (South Africa) Shaun Rudman
24.06.	Germany	Wartburg Open	$ 25,000	Clay	(Czech Republic) Tomáš Zíb	(Netherlands) Edwin Kempes (Netherlands) Martin Verkerk
24.06.	Italy	Sassuolo Challenger	$ 25,000	Clay	(Spain) David Ferrer	(Italy) Leonardo Azzaro (Italy) Potito Starace

=== July ===
Date	Country	Tournament	Prizemoney	Surface	Singles champion	Doubles champions
01.07.	Germany	Müller Cup	$ 50,000	Clay	(Germany) Oliver Gross	(Czech Republic) Leoš Friedl (Czech Republic) David Škoch
01.07.	Italy	Mantova Challenger	$ 25,000	Clay	(Argentina) Mariano Puerta	(Italy) Massimo Bertolini (Italy) Giorgio Galimberti
01.07.	France	Montauban Challenger	$ 25,000	Clay	(France) Richard Gasquet	(Austria) Oliver Marach (Uzbekistan) Oleg Ogorodov
08.07.	Great Britain	West of England Tennis	$ 50,000	Grass	(Slovakia) Karol Beck	(Australia) Dejan Petrović (Pakistan) Aisam-ul-Haq Qureshi
08.07.	Canada	Granby Challenger	$ 50,000	Hard	(Australia) Peter Luczak	(Israel) Noam Behr (United States) Michael Joyce
08.07.	Netherlands	Scheveningen Challenger	$ 50,000	Clay	(Netherlands) Raemon Sluiter	(Netherlands) Edwin Kempes (Netherlands) Martin Verkerk
08.07.	Germany	Oberstaufen Cup	$ 25,000	Clay	(France) Nicolas Thomann	(Chile) Jaime Fillol Jr. (Brazil) Ricardo Schlachter
15.07.	United States	Aptos Challenger	$ 50,000	Hard	(United States) Brian Vahaly	(Israel) Amir Hadad (Argentina) Martín Vassallo Argüello
15.07.	Great Britain	Manchester Challenger	$ 50,000	Grass	(Belarus) Vladimir Voltchkov	(Slovakia) Karol Beck (Pakistan) Aisam-ul-Haq Qureshi
15.07.	Russia	Togliatti Cup	$ 25,000	Hard	(Austria) Alexander Peya	(Russia) Philipp Mukhometov (Russia) Dmitry Vlasov
22.07.	Brazil	Campos Challenger	$ 75,000	Hard	(Brazil) Ricardo Mello	(Mexico) Alejandro Hernández (Brazil) Daniel Melo
22.07.	Netherlands	Hilversum Challenger	$ 75,000	Clay	(Czech Republic) Tomáš Zíb	(Italy) Stefano Pescosolido (Pakistan) Aisam-ul-Haq Qureshi
22.07.	Hungary	Budaors Challenger	$ 50,000	Clay	(Argentina) Diego Moyano	(Chile) Hermes Gamonal (Chile) Adrián García
22.07.	Finland	Tampere Challenger	$ 50,000	Clay	(Finland) Jarkko Nieminen	(United States) Doug Bohaboy (United States) Nick Rainey
29.07.	San Marino	San Marino Challenger	$ 100,000	Clay	(Argentina) José Acasuso	(Czech Republic) Leoš Friedl (Czech Republic) David Škoch
29.07.	Spain	Segovia Challenger	$ 100,000	Hard	(France) Olivier Mutis	(Australia) Tim Crichton (Australia) Todd Perry
29.07.	United States	Lexington Challenger	$ 50,000	Hard	(Australia) Scott Draper	(United States) Jack Brasington (United States) Glenn Weiner
29.07.	Brazil	Belo Horizonte Challenger	$ 25,000	Hard	(Brazil) Ricardo Mello	(Brazil) Daniel Melo (Brazil) Marcelo Melo
29.07.	Russia	St. Petersburg Challenger	$ 25,000	Clay	(Argentina) Sergio Roitman	(Slovakia) František Čermák (Slovakia) Jaroslav Levinský
29.07.	Great Britain	Wrexham Challenger	$ 25,000	Hard	(Germany) Lars Burgsmüller	(Italy) Stefano Pescosolido (Italy) Gianluca Pozzi

=== August ===
Date	Country	Tournament	Prizemoney	Surface	Singles champion	Doubles champions
05.08.	Spain	Córdoba Challenger	$ 75,000	Hard	(France) Jean-François Bachelot	(Czech Republic) Ota Fukárek (South Africa) Paul Rosner
05.08.	United States	Binghamton Professional Tennis Tournament	$ 50,000	Hard	(Australia) Scott Draper	(United States) Paul Goldstein (United States) Scott Humphries
05.08.	Brazil	Gramado Challenger	$ 25,000	Hard	(Brazil) Júlio Silva	(Brazil) Alessandro Guevara (Australia) Dejan Petrović
05.08.	Italy	Trani Challenger	$ 25,000	Clay	(Argentina) Mariano Delfino	(Argentina) Mariano Delfino (Argentina) Roberto Álvarez
12.08.	United States	Bronx Challenger	$ 50,000	Hard	(United States) Mardy Fish	(United Kingdom) Jamie Delgado (United Kingdom) Arvind Parmar
12.08.	Austria	Graz Challenger	$ 50,000	Hard	(France) Olivier Mutis	(Poland) Mariusz Fyrstenberg (Poland) Marcin Matkowski
19.08.	Switzerland	Geneva Challenger	$ 37.500	Clay	(Belgium) Kristof Vliegen	(Romania) Victor Hănescu (Argentina) Leonardo Olguín
19.08.	Italy	Manerbio Challenger	$ 25,000	Clay	(Spain) David Ferrer	(Poland) Mariusz Fyrstenberg (Poland) Marcin Matkowski
26.08.	Italy	Brindisi Challenger	$ 25,000	Clay	(Argentina) Mariano Puerta	(Argentina) Mariano Delfino (Argentina) Sergio Roitman
26.08.	Germany	Black Forest Open	$ 25,000	Clay	(Netherlands) Dennis van Scheppingen	(Argentina) Diego del Río (Argentina) Leonardo Olguín

=== September ===
Date	Country	Tournament	Prizemoney	Surface	Singles champion	Doubles champions
02.09.	Ukraine	Kyiv Challenger	$ 50,000	Clay	(Georgia (country)) Irakli Labadze	(Argentina) Federico Browne (Netherlands) Fred Hemmes
02.09.	Germany	Rhein-Main Challenger	$ 25,000	Clay	(France) Olivier Mutis	(Argentina) Diego del Río (Argentina) Andrés Schneiter
02.09.	Romania	Brașov Challenger	$ 25,000	Clay	(Spain) Rubén Ramírez Hidalgo	(Germany) Christopher Kas (Austria) Herbert Wiltschnig
09.09.	Hungary	Budapest Challenger II	$ 25,000	Clay	(Netherlands) Dennis van Scheppingen	(Australia) Paul Baccanello (Argentina) Sergio Roitman
09.09.	Ukraine	Donetsk Challenger	$ 25,000	Clay	(Argentina) Federico Browne	(Italy) Leonardo Azzaro (Argentina) Federico Browne
09.09.	Bulgaria	Sofia Challenger	$ 25,000	Clay	(Germany) Tomas Behrend	(Germany) Christopher Kas (Austria) Oliver Marach
16.09.	Poland	Szczecin Challenger	$ 125,000	Clay	(Russia) Nikolay Davydenko	(Argentina) José Acasuso (Argentina) Andrés Schneiter
16.09.	Turkey	Istanbul Challenger	$ 75,000	Hard	(Czech Republic) Petr Luxa	(North Macedonia) Aleksandar Kitinov (Croatia) Lovro Zovko
16.09.	United States	Waco Challenger	$ 50,000	Hard	(Chile) Hermes Gamonal	(United States) Huntley Montgomery (United States) Ryan Sachire
16.09.	Bosnia and Herzegovina	Banja Luka Challenger	$ 25,000	Clay	Not completed	(Czech Republic) Jaroslav Levinský (Russia) Yuri Schukin
23.09.	United States	Tulsa Challenger	$ 50,000	Hard	(United States) Robert Kendrick	(United States) Scott Humphries (The Bahamas) Mark Merklein
23.09.	Portugal	Maia Challenger	$ 25,000	Clay	(Romania) Victor Hănescu	(Argentina) Sebastián Prieto (Argentina) Sergio Roitman
23.09.	Uzbekistan	Samarkand Challenger	$ 25,000	Clay	(Greece) Vasilis Mazarakis	(Argentina) Federico Browne (Netherlands) Rogier Wassen
30.09.	United States	Fresno Challenger	$ 50,000	Hard	(Australia) Scott Draper	(United States) Huntley Montgomery (United States) Tripp Phillips
30.09.	France	Grenoble Challenger	$ 50,000	Hard (i)	(France) Michaël Llodra	(Australia) Todd Larkham (Australia) Michael Tebbutt
30.09.	Spain	Seville Challenger	$ 37.500	Clay	(France) Olivier Mutis	(Argentina) Mariano Hood (Peru) Luis Horna
30.09.	Uzbekistan	Bukhara Challenger	$ 25,000	Hard	(Netherlands) John van Lottum	(Switzerland) Yves Allegro (Switzerland) Marco Chiudinelli

=== October ===
Date	Country	Tournament	Prizemoney	Surface	Singles champion	Doubles champions
07.10.	Spain	Barcelona Challenger	$ 50,000	Clay	(Spain) Rubén Ramírez Hidalgo	(Spain) Emilio Benfele Álvarez (Argentina) Mariano Hood
07.10.	Ecuador	Quito Challenger	$ 25,000	Clay	(Belgium) Dick Norman	(United States) Hugo Armando (Venezuela) Kepler Orellana
14.10.	Egypt	Cairo Challenger	$ 50,000	Clay	(Italy) Stefano Galvani	(Germany) Karsten Braasch (Germany) Tomas Behrend
14.10.	Canada	Burbank Challenger	$ 25,000	Hard	(United States) Robby Ginepri	(Sweden) Björn Rehnquist (South Africa) Louis Vosloo
21.10.	South Korea	Seoul Challenger	$ 25,000	Hard	(Austria) Werner Eschauer	(Australia) Jaymon Crabb (New Zealand) Mark Nielsen
21.10.	United States	San Antonio Challenger	$ 50,000	Hard	(United States) Mardy Fish	(United States) Diego Ayala (United States) Robert Kendrick
28.10.	Brazil	São Paulo Challenger	$ 25,000	Clay	(Argentina) Franco Squillari	(Argentina) Mariano Hood (Argentina) Sebastián Prieto
28.10.	Germany	Lambertz Open by STAWAG	$ 50,000	Carpet (i)	(Belarus) Vladimir Voltchkov	(United States) Jim Thomas (Belgium) Tom Vanhoudt
28.10.	United States	Azalea Orthopedic Challenger	$ 50,000	Hard	(United States) Paul Goldstein	(Australia) Peter Luczak (Russia) Dmitry Tursunov
28.10.	Great Britain	Nottingham Challenger	$ 25,000	Clay	(Belgium) Gilles Elseneer	(Australia) Ashley Fisher (Australia) Stephen Huss
28.10.	Réunion	Réunion Challenger	$ 25,000	Hard	(Argentina) Federico Browne	(Argentina) Federico Browne (Israel) Jonathan Erlich

=== November ===
Date	Country	Tournament	Prizemoney	Surface	Singles champion	Doubles champions
04.11.	Slovakia	Bratislava Challenger	$ 100,000	Carpet (i)	(France) Antony Dupuis	(United States) Scott Humphries (The Bahamas) Mark Merklein
04.11.	Germany	Okal Cup	$ 25,000	Carpet (i)	(Germany) Lars Burgsmüller	(Switzerland) Yves Allegro (Croatia) Lovro Zovko
11.11.	Finland	Helsinki Challenger	$ 50,000	Hard (i)	(Finland) Jarkko Nieminen	(Croatia) Mario Ančić (Croatia) Lovro Zovko
11.11.	United States	Knoxville Challenger	$ 50,000	Hard (i)	Netherlands Martin Verkerk	(Russia) Dmitry Tursunov (Netherlands) Martin Verkerk
18.11.	United States	Champaign Challenger	$ 50,000	Hard (i)	(United States) Robby Ginepri	(Romania) Gabriel Trifu (United States) Glenn Weiner
18.11.	Czech Republic	Prague Challenger II	$ 25,000	Carpet (i)	(Croatia) Mario Ančić	(Slovakia) Karol Beck (Czech Republic) Jaroslav Levinský
18.11.	Mexico	Puebla Challenger	$ 25,000	Hard (i)	(United States) Alex Bogomolov Jr.	(Mexico) Miguel Gallardo Valles (Mexico) Alejandro González
25.11.	Italy	Milan Challenger	$ 50,000	Carpet (i)	(Croatia) Mario Ančić	(Italy) Massimo Bertolini (Italy) Giorgio Galimberti
25.11.	Japan	Yokohama Challenger	$ 25,000	Carpet	(South Korea) Lee Hyung-taik	(Chinese Taipei) Lu Yen-hsun (Thailand) Danai Udomchoke

=== December ===
Date	Country	Tournament	Prizemoney	Surface	Singles champion	Doubles champions
02.12.	Thailand	Bangkok Challenger	$ 25,000	Hard	(Netherlands) John van Lottum	(Australia) Anthony Ross (Australia) Grant Silcock
