= 2024 Tunis Open =

- Date: 13–18 May
- Edition: 14th
- Surface: Clay
- Location: Tunis, Tunisia

Champions

Singles
- (Spain) Oriol Roca Batalla

Doubles
- (Argentina) Federico Agustín Gómez / (United Kingdom) Marcus Willis
- Tunis Open

The 2024 Tunis Open, known as the Kia Tunis Open, was a professional tennis tournament played on clay courts. It was the 14th edition of the tournament which was part of the 2024 ATP Challenger Tour. It took place in Tunis, Tunisia between 13 and 18 May 2024.

== Singles main-draw entrants ==
=== Seeds ===
Country	Player	Rank^{1}	Seed
MON	Valentin Vacherot	120	1
BIH	Damir Džumhur	131	2
~~FRA~~	~~Titouan Droguet~~	~~146~~	~~3~~
NED	Jesper de Jong	162	4
JPN	Sho Shimabukuro	165	5
FRA	Benjamin Bonzi	175	6
ITA	Stefano Travaglia	186	7
ARG	Genaro Alberto Olivieri	191	8

- ^{1} Rankings are as of 6 May 2024.

=== Other entrants ===
The following players received wildcards into the singles main draw:

- (Georgia (country)) Nikoloz Basilashvili
- (Spain) Martín Landaluce
- (Tunisia) Aziz Ouakaa

The following players received entry into the singles main draw as alternates:

- (Netherlands) Gijs Brouwer
- (Tunisia) Aziz Dougaz
- (United States) Mitchell Krueger

The following players received entry from the qualifying draw:

- (South Korea) Gerard Campaña Lee
- (Italy) Marco Cecchinato
- (United Kingdom) Felix Gill
- (Kazakhstan) Timofey Skatov
- (Czech Republic) Michael Vrbenský
- (Italy) Alexander Weis

The following player received entry as a lucky loser:

- (France) Tristan Lamasine

== Champions ==
=== Singles ===
- (Spain) Oriol Roca Batalla def. (France) Valentin Royer 7–6^{(7–5)}, 7–5.

=== Doubles ===
- (Argentina) Federico Agustín Gómez / (United Kingdom) Marcus Willis def. (Czech Republic) Patrik Rikl / (Czech Republic) Michael Vrbenský 4–6, 6–1, [10–6].
