= 2022 Tunis Open =

- Date: 16–21 May
- Edition: 12th
- Surface: Clay
- Location: Tunis, Tunisia

Champions

Singles
- (Spain) Roberto Carballés Baena

Doubles
- (Colombia) Nicolás Barrientos / (Mexico) Miguel Ángel Reyes-Varela
- Tunis Open

The 2022 Tunis Open, known as the Tunis Open by Kia, was a professional tennis tournament played on clay courts. It was the 12th edition of the tournament which was part of the 2022 ATP Challenger Tour. It took place in Tunis, Tunisia between 16 and 21 May 2022.

== Singles main-draw entrants ==
=== Seeds ===
Country	Player	Rank^{1}	Seed
AUS	Jordan Thompson	85	1
ESP	Roberto Carballés Baena	96	2
ESP	Javier Barranco Cosano	251	3
POR	Frederico Ferreira Silva	255	4
NED	Jelle Sels	256	5
GER	Nicola Kuhn	258	6
CHN	Zhang Zhizhen	261	7
BEL	Kimmer Coppejans	267	8

- ^{1} Rankings are as of 9 May 2022.

=== Other entrants ===
The following players received wildcards into the singles main draw:

- (Tunisia) Moez Echargui
- (Tunisia) Skander Mansouri
- (Tunisia) Aziz Ouakaa

The following players received entry into the singles main draw as alternates:

- (Belgium) Michael Geerts
- (France) Calvin Hemery
- (Tunisia) Malek Jaziri
- (Serbia) Peđa Krstin

The following players received entry from the qualifying draw:

- (Switzerland) Rémy Bertola
- (Spain) Miguel Damas
- (Austria) Alexander Erler
- (United Kingdom) Felix Gill
- (Spain) Carlos Sánchez Jover
- (Bosnia and Herzegovina) Aldin Šetkić

== Champions ==
=== Singles ===
- (Spain) Roberto Carballés Baena def. (Netherlands) Gijs Brouwer 6–1, 6–1.

=== Doubles ===
- (Colombia) Nicolás Barrientos / (Mexico) Miguel Ángel Reyes-Varela def. (Austria) Alexander Erler / (Austria) Lucas Miedler 6–7^{(3–7)}, 6–3, [11–9].
