= 2013 Tunis Open – Doubles =

Doubles
- 2013 Tunis Open

Final
- Champions: (Germany) Dominik Meffert (Austria) Philipp Oswald
- Runners-up: (United Kingdom) Jamie Delgado (Sweden) Andreas Siljeström
- Score: 3–6, 7–6^{(7–0)}, [10–7]

Events
| Singles | Doubles |
- Tunis Open

Jerzy Janowicz and Jürgen Zopp were the defending champions but decided not to participate.
Dominik Meffert and Philipp Oswald defeated Jamie Delgado and Andreas Siljeström 3–6, 7–6^{(7–0)}, [10–7] in the final to win the title.

== Seeds ==
1. (United States) James Cerretani / (Canada) Adil Shamasdin (first round)
2. (United Kingdom) Jamie Delgado / (Sweden) Andreas Siljeström (final)
3. (Spain) Gerard Granollers / (Spain) Marcel Granollers (quarterfinals, withdrawn)
4. (Australia) Rameez Junaid / (Spain) Adrián Menéndez-Maceiras (first round)

== Draw ==
Key

- Q = Qualifier
- WC = Wild card
- LL = Lucky loser
- Alt = Alternate
- ITF = ITF entry
- PR = Protected ranking
- SR = Special ranking
- SE = Special exempt
- JE = Junior exempt
- JR = Junior Accelerator Programme entrant
- CO = College Accelerator Programme entrant
- NG = Next Gen Accelerator Program entrant
- w/o = Walkover
- r = Retired
- d = Defaulted

=== Draw ===
First round
1 | (United States) J Cerretani (Canada) A Shamasdin | 7^{7} | 6^{4} | [6]
(France) N Mahut (France) F Serra | 6^{1} | 7^{7} | [10]
WC | (Tunisia) Mehdi Abid (Tunisia) Ameur Ben Hassen | 1 | 0
(Germany) D Meffert (Austria) P Oswald | 6 | 6
3 | (Spain) G Granollers (Spain) M Granollers | 6 | 6
WC | (France) Julien Obry (France) Florian Reynet | 1 | 3
WC | (Tunisia) S Mansouri (Algeria) L Ouahab | w/o
(Spain) D Muñoz de la Nava (Spain) R Ramírez Hidalgo
PR | (France) Laurent Rochette (Argentina) DS Schwartzman | 2 | 1
(Ukraine) O Nedovyesov (Ukraine) I Sergeyev | 6 | 6
(Italy) F Cipolla (Italy) A di Mauro | 6 | 6
4 | (Australia) R Junaid (Spain) A Menéndez-Maceiras | 2 | 1
(Moldova) R Albot (Germany) B Becker | 6 | 6
Alt | (Spain) A Brugués-Davi (Spain) E López-Pérez | 2 | 2
(Uzbekistan) F Dustov (Romania) A Ungur | 5 | 3
2 | (United Kingdom) J Delgado (Sweden) A Siljeström | 7 | 6

Quarterfinals
(France) N Mahut (France) F Serra | 6^{5} | 6^{3}
(Germany) D Meffert (Austria) P Oswald | 7^{7} | 7^{7}
3 | (Spain) G Granollers (Spain) M Granollers
WC | (Tunisia) S Mansouri (Algeria) L Ouahab | w/o
(Ukraine) O Nedovyesov (Ukraine) I Sergeyev | 4 | 1
(Italy) F Cipolla (Italy) A di Mauro | 6 | 6
(Moldova) R Albot (Germany) B Becker | 6^{6} | 6^{7}
2 | (United Kingdom) J Delgado (Sweden) A Siljeström | 7^{8} | 7^{9}

Semifinals
(Germany) D Meffert (Austria) P Oswald | 6 | 6
WC | (Tunisia) S Mansouri (Algeria) L Ouahab | 2 | 3
(Italy) F Cipolla (Italy) A di Mauro | 2 | 2
2 | (United Kingdom) J Delgado (Sweden) A Siljeström | 6 | 6

Final
(Germany) D Meffert (Austria) P Oswald | 3 | 7^{7} | [10]
2 | (United Kingdom) J Delgado (Sweden) A Siljeström | 6 | 6^{0} | [7]
