= Hynek Bartoň =

Czech tennis player (born 2004)

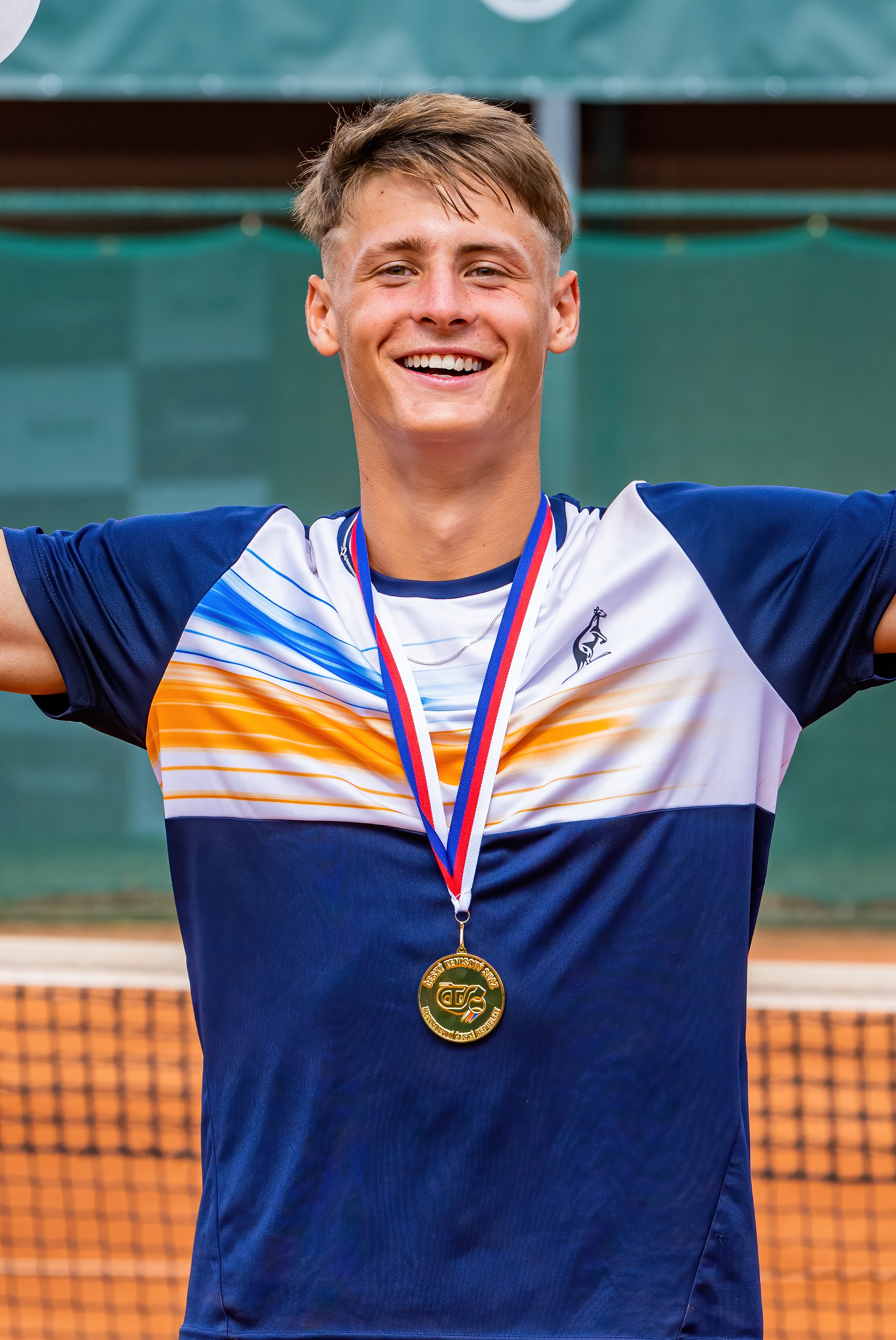
- Bartoň in 2022
- Country (sports): Czech Republic
- Residence: Prague, Czech Republic
- Born: 5 April 2004 (age 22) Nový Jičín, Czech Republic
- Height: 1.83 m (6 ft 0 in)
- Turned pro: 2022
- Plays: Right-handed (two-handed backhand)
- Prize money: US $169,248

Singles
- Career record: 0–0
- Career titles: 0
- Highest ranking: No. 247 (15 June 2026)
- Current ranking: No. 247 (15 June 2026)

Doubles
- Career record: 0–0
- Career titles: 0
- Highest ranking: No. 229 (4 August 2025)
- Current ranking: No. 264 (15 June 2026)
- Last updated on: 15 June 2026.

Hynek Bartoň (born 5 April 2004) is a Czech professional tennis player. He has a career-high ATP singles ranking of No. 247 achieved on 15 June 2026 and a doubles ranking of No. 229 achieved on 4 August 2025.

== Early life ==
Bartoň grew up in Kopřivnice, Nový Jičín. His father, Miroslav, is a former handball player. His older brother, Dominik, played collegiate tennis for the University of North Florida. Bartoň played for TK Agrofert Prostějov before moving to TK Sparta Prague.

== Junior career ==
In July 2021, Bartoň won the J3 Moravia Steel Sparta Cup in Prague. In June 2022, he won the J1 ITF German Juniors in Bamberg, defeating top seed Rodrigo Pacheco Méndez in the final. That August, he won the Pardubice Junior, a prestigious junior tournament in the Czech Republic. The following month, he reached the boys' singles quarterfinals of the US Open.

== Professional career ==
In September 2022, after winning the Pardubice Junior tournament the previous month, Bartoň also won the $25k Pardubice Open as a wildcard. En route to the title, he defeated second seed Andrew Paulson and third seed Felix Gill in the final.

In June 2023, he made his Challenger debut after qualifying for the Czech Open, and upset eighth seed Flavio Cobolli in the first round. Later that month, he reached the final of the $15k Kamen Open, but lost to Svyatoslav Gulin. In August, he reached the final of the $25k BKT Advantage Cup in Bielsko-Biała, but lost to third seed Juan Bautista Torres. In October, he reached the second round of the Ortisei Challenger after defeating David Jordà Sanchis.

In July 2024, he and partner Jiří Veselý reached the doubles semifinals of the Tampere Open after upsetting the top-seeded team of Nam Ji-sung and Hunter Reese.

He won his first Challenger doubles title in May 2025 at the Tunis Open, partnering compatriot Michael Vrbenský and defeating Siddhant Banthia and Alexander Donski in the final.

== ATP Challenger and ITF World Tennis Tour finals ==
=== Singles: 6 (2 titles, 4 runner-ups) ===
Legend
ITF World Tennis Tour (2–4)

Result	W–L	Date	Tournament	Tier	Surface	Opponent	Score
Win	1–0	Sep 2022	M25 Pardubice, Czech Republic	World Tennis Tour	Clay	(United Kingdom) Felix Gill	7–5, 7–5
Loss	1–1	Jun 2023	M15 Kamen, Germany	World Tennis Tour	Clay	(Russia) Svyatoslav Gulin	6–2, 4–6, 2–6
Loss	1–2	Aug 2023	M25 Bielsko-Biała, Poland	World Tennis Tour	Clay	(Argentina) Juan Bautista Torres	4–6, 5–7
Loss	1–3	Nov 2023	M25 Vale do Lobo, Portugal	World Tennis Tour	Hard	(Portugal) Henrique Rocha	3–6, 1–6
Loss	1–4	Mar 2024	M25 Vale do Lobo, Portugal	World Tennis Tour	Hard	(Portugal) Jaime Faria	2–6, 1–3, ret.
Win	2–4	Mar 2026	M15 Foggia, Italy	World Tennis Tour	Clay	(Italy) Francesco Forti	6–7^{(11–13)}, 6–4, 6–4

=== Doubles: 6 (2 titles, 4 runner-ups) ===
Legend
ATP Challenger Tour (2–1)
ITF World Tennis Tour (0–3)

Result	W–L	Date	Tournament	Tier	Surface	Partner	Opponents	Score
Loss	0–1	Jun 2023	M15 Kuršumlijska Banja, Serbia	World Tennis Tour	Clay	(Switzerland) Patrick Schön	(United States) William Grant (United States) Tyler Zink	7–6^{(7–3)}, 4–6, [12–14]
Loss	0–2	Nov 2023	M25 Vale do Lobo, Portugal	World Tennis Tour	Hard	(Czech Republic) Michal Lušovský	(Portugal) Francisco Rocha (Portugal) Henrique Rocha	0–3 ret.
Loss	0–3	Nov 2023	M25 Vale do Lobo, Portugal	World Tennis Tour	Hard	(Czech Republic) Michal Lušovský	(Czech Republic) David Poljak (Czech Republic) Matěj Vocel	6–4, 3–6, [9–11]
Win	1–3	May 2025	Tunis, Tunisia	Challenger	Clay	(Czech Republic) Michael Vrbenský	(India) Siddhant Banthia (Bulgaria) Alexander Donski	5–7, 6–4, [10–7]
Win	2–3	Apr 2026	Sarasota, United States	Challenger	Clay	(United States) Martin Damm	(United States) Garrett Johns (United States) Theodore Winegar	6–2, 6–1
Loss	2–4	May 2026	Tunis, Tunisia	Challenger	Clay	(Czech Republic) Michael Vrbenský	(Spain) Sergio Martos Gornés (Poland) Szymon Walków	6–1, 5–7, [8–10]
