= 2018 Tunis Open =

- Date: 16–22 April
- Edition: 10th
- Draw: 32S / 16D
- Surface: Clay
- Location: Tunis, Tunisia

Champions

Singles
- (Argentina) Guido Andreozzi

Doubles
- (Ukraine) Denys Molchanov / (Slovakia) Igor Zelenay
- Tunis Open

The 2018 Tunis Open was a professional tennis tournament played on clay courts. It was the tenth edition of the tournament which was part of the 2018 ATP Challenger Tour. It took place in Tunis, Tunisia between 16 and 22 April 2018.

== Singles main-draw entrants ==
=== Seeds ===
Country	Player	Rank^{1}	Seed
~~CZE~~	~~Jiří Veselý~~	~~65~~	~~1~~
GEO	Nikoloz Basilashvili	86	2
TUN	Malek Jaziri	91	3
MDA	Radu Albot	93	4
ITA	Thomas Fabbiano	102	5
POR	Gastão Elias	106	6
POR	Pedro Sousa	118	7
SWE	Elias Ymer	134	8

- ^{1} Rankings are as of 9 April 2018.

=== Other entrants ===
The following players received wildcards into the singles main draw:

- (Tunisia) Mohamed Ali Bellalouna
- (Tunisia) Moez Echargui
- (Morocco) Lamine Ouahab
- (Australia) Alexei Popyrin

The following player received entry into the singles main draw as a special exempt:

- (Georgia (country)) Nikoloz Basilashvili

The following players received entry from the qualifying draw:

- (Spain) Daniel Gimeno Traver
- (France) Maxime Janvier
- (Hungary) Zsombor Piros
- (Czech Republic) Lukáš Rosol

The following player received entry as a lucky loser:

- (Germany) Daniel Masur

== Champions ==
=== Singles ===
- (Argentina) Guido Andreozzi def. (Spain) Daniel Gimeno Traver 6–2, 3–0 ret.

=== Doubles ===
- (Ukraine) Denys Molchanov / (Slovakia) Igor Zelenay def. (France) Jonathan Eysseric / (United Kingdom) Joe Salisbury 7–6^{(7–4)}, 6–2.
