= Tunis Open =

- 2025 Tunis Open

ATP Challenger Tour
- Event name: Kia Tunis Open
- Location: Tunis, Tunisia
- Venue: Tennis Club de Tunis
- Category: ATP Challenger Tour
- Surface: Clay
- Draw: 32S/21Q/16D
- Prize money: US$100,000 (2025), 82,000 (2024), 125,000+H (2022)
- Website: website

Current champions (2025)
- Singles: (Hungary) Zsombor Piros
- Doubles: (Czech Republic) Hynek Bartoň (Czech Republic) Michael Vrbenský

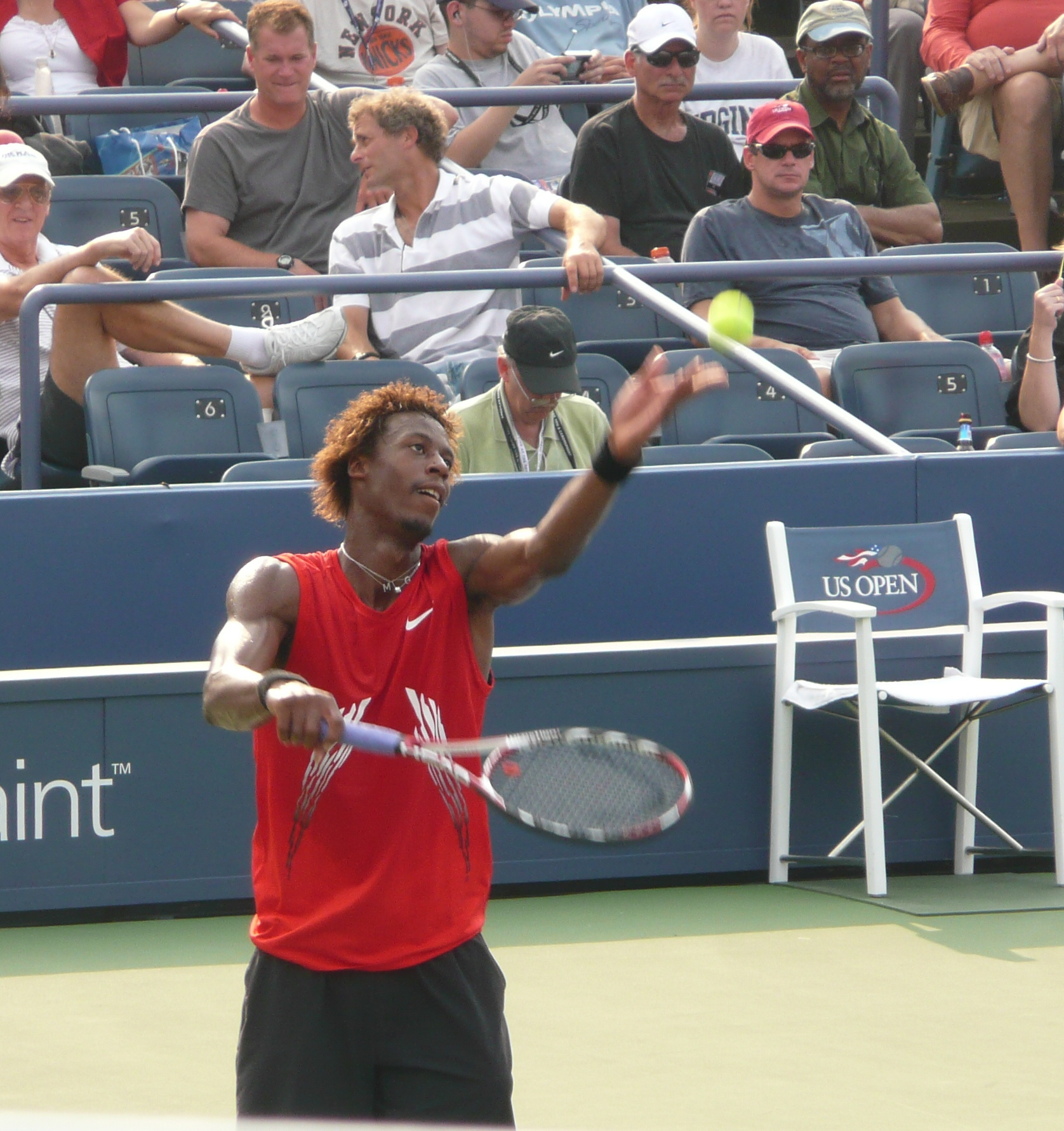
Eventual top-tenner Gaël Monfils won the 2005 all-French singles final against Fabrice Santoro

The Kia Tunis Open is a professional tennis tournament played on outdoor red clay courts. It is currently part of the Association of Tennis Professionals (ATP) Challenger Tour. It is held annually at the Tennis Club de Tunis (TCT) in Tunis, Tunisia, since 2002. After a two year absence, the event made its return on the Challenger tour in 2022.

Simone Bolelli is the record singles holder with two wins.

== Past finals ==
=== Singles ===
Year	Champion	Runner-up	Score
2005	(France) Gaël Monfils	(France) Fabrice Santoro	7–5, 3–6, 7–6^{(11–9)}
2006	(Algeria) Lamine Ouahab	(Morocco) Younes El Aynaoui	walkover
2007	(Italy) Simone Bolelli (1)	(Romania) Andrei Pavel	4–6, 7–6^{(7–4)}, 6–2
2008	(Brazil) Thomaz Bellucci	(Serbia) Dušan Vemić	6–2, 6–4
2009	(Argentina) Gastón Gaudio	(Portugal) Frederico Gil	6–2, 1–6, 6–3
2010	(Argentina) José Acasuso	(Germany) Daniel Brands	6–3, 6–4
2011	Not Held		
2012	(Spain) Rubén Ramírez Hidalgo	(France) Jérémy Chardy	6–1, 6–4
2013	(Romania) Adrian Ungur	(Argentina) Diego Schwartzman	4–6, 6–0, 6–2
2014	(Italy) Simone Bolelli (2)	(Germany) Julian Reister	6–4, 6–2
2015- 2017	Not Held		
2018	(Argentina) Guido Andreozzi	(Spain) Daniel Gimeno Traver	6–2, 3–0 ret.
2019	(Uruguay) Pablo Cuevas	(Portugal) João Domingues	7–5, 6–4
2020- 2021	Not Held		
2022	(Spain) Roberto Carballés Baena	(Netherlands) Gijs Brouwer	6–1, 6–1
2023	(Japan) Sho Shimabukuro	(France) Geoffrey Blancaneaux	6–4, 6–4
2024	(Spain) Oriol Roca Batalla	(France) Valentin Royer	7–6^{(7–5)}, 7–5
2025	(Hungary) Zsombor Piros	(France) Titouan Droguet	7–5, 7–6^{(7–3)}
2026	(United States) Tristan Boyer	(United States) Dali Blanch	6–1, 6–0

=== Doubles ===
Year	Champions	Runners-up	Score
2005	(Germany) Tomas Behrend (Sweden) Robert Lindstedt	(Switzerland) Marco Chiudinelli (Switzerland) Jean-Claude Scherrer	3–6, 6–1, 6–3
2006	(Spain) Daniel Gimeno Traver (Spain) Iván Navarro	(Netherlands) Bart Beks (Netherlands) Martijn van Haasteren	6–2, 7–5
2007	(Poland) Łukasz Kubot (Austria) Oliver Marach	(Spain) Marc Fornell (Algeria) Lamine Ouahab	6–2, 6–2
2008	(Brazil) Thomaz Bellucci (Brazil) Bruno Soares	(Switzerland) Jean-Claude Scherrer (France) Nicolas Tourte	6–3, 6–4
2009	(Argentina) Brian Dabul (Argentina) Leonardo Mayer	(Sweden) Johan Brunström (Netherlands Antilles) Jean-Julien Rojer	6–4, 7–6^{(8–6)}
2010	(South Africa) Jeff Coetzee (Belgium) Kristof Vliegen	(United States) James Cerretani (Canada) Adil Shamasdin	7–6^{(7–3)}, 6–3
2011	Not Held		
2012	(Poland) Jerzy Janowicz (Estonia) Jürgen Zopp	(United States) Nicholas Monroe (Germany) Simon Stadler	7–6^{(7–1)}, 6–3
2013	(Germany) Dominik Meffert (Austria) Philipp Oswald	(United Kingdom) Jamie Delgado (Sweden) Andreas Siljeström	3–6, 7–6^{(7–0)}, [10–7]
2014	(France) Pierre-Hugues Herbert (Canada) Adil Shamasdin	(Netherlands) Stephan Fransen (Netherlands) Jesse Huta Galung	6–3, 7–6^{(7–5)}
2015- 2017	Not Held		
2018	(Ukraine) Denys Molchanov (Slovakia) Igor Zelenay	(France) Jonathan Eysseric (United Kingdom) Joe Salisbury	7–6^{(7–4)}, 6–2
2019	(Belgium) Ruben Bemelmans (Germany) Tim Pütz	(Argentina) Facundo Argüello (Argentina) Guillermo Durán	6–3, 6–1
2020- 2021	Not Held		
2022	(Colombia) Nicolás Barrientos (Mexico) Miguel Ángel Reyes-Varela	(Austria) Alexander Erler (Austria) Lucas Miedler	6–7^{(3–7)}, 6–3, [11–9]
2023	(France) Théo Arribagé (France) Luca Sanchez	(Australia) James McCabe (Tunisia) Aziz Ouakaa	4–6, 6–3, [10–5]
2024	(Argentina) Federico Agustín Gómez (United Kingdom) Marcus Willis	(Czech Republic) Patrik Rikl (Czech Republic) Michael Vrbenský	4–6, 6–1, [10–6]
2025	(Czech Republic) Hynek Bartoň (Czech Republic) Michael Vrbenský	(India) Siddhant Banthia (Bulgaria) Alexander Donski	5–7, 6–4, [10–7]
2026	(Spain) Sergio Martos Gornés (Poland) Szymon Walków	(Czech Republic) Hynek Bartoň (Czech Republic) Michael Vrbenský	1–6, 7–5, [10–8]
