= 2024 Burnie International – Men's doubles =

Men's doubles
- 2024 Burnie International

Final
- Champions: (Australia) Alex Bolt (Australia) Luke Saville
- Runners-up: (Australia) Tristan Schoolkate (Australia) Adam Walton
- Score: 5–7, 6–3, [12–10]

Events
Singles	men	women
Doubles	men	women
← 2023 ·	Burnie International	· 2024 →

Marc Polmans and Max Purcell were the defending champions but chose not to defend their title.

Alex Bolt and Luke Saville won the title after defeating Tristan Schoolkate and Adam Walton 5–7, 6–3, [12–10] in the final.

== Seeds ==
1. (Australia) Alex Bolt / (Australia) Luke Saville (champions)
2. (Australia) Tristan Schoolkate / (Australia) Adam Walton (final)
3. (Australia) Blake Ellis / (Australia) Calum Puttergill (quarterfinals)
4. (Greece) Stefanos Sakellaridis / (Australia) Adam Taylor (first round)

== Draw ==
Key

- Q = Qualifier
- WC = Wild card
- LL = Lucky loser
- Alt = Alternate
- ITF = ITF entry
- PR = Protected ranking
- SR = Special ranking
- SE = Special exempt
- JE = Junior exempt
- JR = Junior Accelerator Programme entrant
- CO = College Accelerator Programme entrant
- NG = Next Gen Accelerator Program entrant
- w/o = Walkover
- r = Retired
- d = Defaulted

First round
1	(Australia) A Bolt (Australia) L Saville	6	6
WC	(Australia) Jacob Bradshaw (Australia) J Delaney	2	2
(Australia) MC Romios (Australia) D Sweeny	6	6
WC	(Australia) M Bouzige (Australia) B Mott	3	4
4	(Greece) S Sakellaridis (Australia) A Taylor	2	6	[5]
(Australia) B Bayldon (Australia) K Pearson	6	4	[10]
(Australia) P Harper (Australia) A Harris	6^{5}	5
PR	(Japan) T Ichikawa (Japan) S Watanabe	7^{7}	7
(United States) Christian Langmo (Australia) B Walkin	6	3	[4]
(Japan) Shintaro Imai (Japan) Y Uchiyama	3	6	[10]
(France) M Chazal; Mikalai Haliak	1	4
3	(Australia) B Ellis (Australia) C Puttergill	6	6
(Japan) Yuki Mochizuki (Japan) Makoto Ochi	6^{5}	6^{4}
(Japan) H Moriya (Japan) Y Takahashi	7^{7}	7^{7}
(Australia) O Jasika (Japan) R Noguchi	5	2
2	(Australia) T Schoolkate (Australia) A Walton	7	6

Quarterfinals
1	(Australia) A Bolt (Australia) L Saville	6	7^{7}
(Australia) MC Romios (Australia) D Sweeny	2	6^{5}
(Australia) B Bayldon (Australia) K Pearson	6^{4}	7	[10]
PR	(Japan) T Ichikawa (Japan) S Watanabe	7^{7}	5	[7]
(Japan) S Imai (Japan) Y Uchiyama	6	3	[10]
3	(Australia) B Ellis (Australia) C Puttergill	4	6	[8]
(Japan) H Moriya (Japan) Y Takahashi	3	6	[6]
2	(Australia) T Schoolkate (Australia) A Walton	6	3	[10]

Semifinals
1	(Australia) A Bolt (Australia) L Saville	6	6
(Australia) B Bayldon (Australia) K Pearson	4	2
(Japan) S Imai (Japan) Y Uchiyama	7	2	[7]
2	(Australia) T Schoolkate (Australia) A Walton	5	6	[10]

Final
1	(Australia) A Bolt (Australia) L Saville	5	6	[12]
2	(Australia) T Schoolkate (Australia) A Walton	7	3	[10]
