= 2024 Burnie International =

- Date: 29 January – 4 February
- Edition: 19th (men); 13th (women)
- Category: ATP Challenger Tour; ITF Women's World Tennis Tour
- Surface: Hard
- Location: Burnie, Australia

Champions

Men's singles
- (Australia) Omar Jasika

Women's singles
- (Australia) Priscilla Hon

Men's doubles
- (Australia) Alex Bolt / (Australia) Luke Saville

Women's doubles
- (New Zealand) Paige Hourigan / (New Zealand) Erin Routliffe
← 2023 ·	Burnie International	· 2024 →

The 2024 Burnie International was a professional tennis tournament played on outdoor hard courts. It was the 19th (men) and 13th (women) editions of the tournament which was part of the 2024 ATP Challenger Tour and the 2024 ITF Women's World Tennis Tour. It took place in Burnie, Australia between 29 January and 4 February 2024.

== Men's singles main-draw entrants ==
=== Seeds ===
Country	Player	Rank^{1}	Seed
AUS	Rinky Hijikata	71	1
AUS	Marc Polmans	154	2
AUS	Adam Walton	174	3
AUS	Tristan Schoolkate	249	4
AUS	Dane Sweeny	257	5
JPN	Yasutaka Uchiyama	268	6
AUS	James McCabe	269	7
AUS	Philip Sekulic	274	8

- ^{1} Rankings are as of 15 January 2024.

=== Other entrants ===
The following players received wildcards into the singles main draw:

- (Australia) Moerani Bouzige
- (Australia) Jacob Bradshaw
- (Australia) Hayden Jones

The following players received entry from the qualifying draw:

- (Australia) Matt Hulme
- (Japan) Shintaro Imai
- (Japan) Kokoro Isomura
- (Australia) Scott Jones
- (Japan) Takuya Kumasaka
- (Japan) Yuki Mochizuki

== Women's singles main-draw entrants ==
=== Seeds ===
Country	Player	Rank^{1}	Seed
CZE	Gabriela Knutson	168	1
AUS	Priscilla Hon	205	2
AUS	Destanee Aiava	208	3
AUS	Jaimee Fourlis	214	4
CHN	Ma Yexin	220	5
CHN	You Xiaodi	225	6
CHN	Wei Sijia	233	7
THA	Mananchaya Sawangkaew	259	8

- ^{1} Rankings are as of 15 January 2024.

=== Other entrants ===
The following players received wildcards into the singles main draw:

- (Australia) Maya Joint
- (Australia) Ivana Popovic

The following player received entry using a junior exempt:

- (Slovakia) Renáta Jamrichová

The following player received entry using a special ranking:

- (Romania) Irina Fetecău

The following players received entry from the qualifying draw:

- (Australia) Gabriella Da Silva-Fick
- (Japan) Miho Kuramochi
- (Australia) Elena Micic
- (Japan) Yuki Naito
- (Australia) Alana Parnaby
- (Spain) Kaitlin Quevedo
- (Japan) Erika Sema
- (Japan) Ena Shibahara

== Champions ==
=== Men's singles ===
- (Australia) Omar Jasika def. (Australia) Alex Bolt 6–2, 6–7^{(2–7)}, 6–3.

=== Women's singles ===
- (Australia) Priscilla Hon def. (Japan) Sara Saito 6–3, 6–0.

=== Men's doubles ===
- (Australia) Alex Bolt / (Australia) Luke Saville def. (Australia) Tristan Schoolkate / (Australia) Adam Walton 5–7, 6–3, [12–10].

=== Women's doubles ===
- (New Zealand) Paige Hourigan / (New Zealand) Erin Routliffe def. (Japan) Kyōka Okamura / (Japan) Ayano Shimizu 7–6^{(7–5)}, 6–4.
