= 2024 Burnie International II – Men's singles =

Men's singles
- 2024 Burnie International II

Final
- Champion: (Australia) Adam Walton
- Runner-up: (Australia) Dane Sweeny
- Score: 6–2, 7–6^{(7–4)}

Events
Singles	men	women
Doubles	men	women
← 2024 ·	Burnie International	· 2025 →

Omar Jasika was the defending champion but lost in the second round to Tristan Schoolkate.

Adam Walton won the title after defeating Dane Sweeny 6–2, 7–6^{(7–4)} in the final.

== Seeds ==
1. (Australia) Adam Walton (champion)
2. (Japan) Yuta Shimizu (second round)
3. (Australia) Li Tu (quarterfinals)
4. (Australia) Dane Sweeny (final)
5. (Australia) Tristan Schoolkate (semifinals)
6. (Japan) Yasutaka Uchiyama (semifinals, retired)
7. (Australia) James McCabe (quarterfinals)
8. (Australia) Philip Sekulic (quarterfinals)

== Draw ==
=== Key ===
- Q = Qualifier
- WC = Wild card
- LL = Lucky loser
- Alt = Alternate
- SE = Special exempt
- PR = Protected ranking
- ITF = ITF entry
- JE = Junior exempt
- w/o = Walkover
- r = Retired
- d = Defaulted
- SR = Special ranking

=== Finals ===
Semifinals
1	(Australia) Adam Walton	6	6
5	(Australia) Tristan Schoolkate	4	4
4	(Australia) Dane Sweeny	6	3
6	(Japan) Yasutaka Uchiyama	2	1^{r}

Final
1	(Australia) Adam Walton	6	7^{7}
4	(Australia) Dane Sweeny	2	6^{4}

=== Top half ===
First round
1	(Australia) A Walton	7	6
LL	(Australia) Jacob Bradshaw	5	3
Q	(Australia) C Puttergill	4	6	3
Q	(United States) Andre Ilagan	6	3	6
(Australia) Matthew Dellavedova	2	0
(Japan) H Moriya	6	6
(France) M Chazal	3	4
8	(Australia) P Sekulic	6	6
3	(Australia) L Tu	6	6
(Greece) S Sakellaridis	3	3
Mikalai Haliak	1	7^{7}	3
(Japan) Y Takahashi	6	6^{3}	6
(Australia) O Jasika	6	7^{7}
WC	(Australia) H Jones	3	6^{3}
WC	(Australia) J Delaney	3	2
5	(Australia) T Schoolkate	6	6

Second round
1	(Australia) A Walton	6	6^{3}	6
Q	(United States) A Ilagan	2	7^{7}	3
(Japan) H Moriya	4	3
8	(Australia) P Sekulic	6	6
3	(Australia) L Tu	6	3	6
(Japan) Y Takahashi	4	6	3
(Australia) O Jasika	2	3
5	(Australia) T Schoolkate	6	6

Quarterfinals
1	(Australia) A Walton	6	1	7^{7}
8	(Australia) P Sekulic	2	6	6^{2}
3	(Australia) L Tu	6^{4}	4
5	(Australia) T Schoolkate	7^{7}	6

Semifinals
1	(Australia) A Walton	6	6
5	(Australia) T Schoolkate	4	4

=== Bottom half ===
First round
7	(Australia) J McCabe	6	6
(Australia) B Ellis	4	4
(Australia) L Saville	6	6
(Zimbabwe) B Lock	1	0
Q	(Japan) M Imamura	5	2
Alt	(Japan) Makoto Ochi	7	6
(Japan) R Noguchi	4	4
4	(Australia) D Sweeny	6	6
6	(Japan) Y Uchiyama	6	6
Q	(Japan) Takuya Kumasaka	0	2
WC	(Australia) M Hulme	6	7^{7}
Q	(Japan) Yuki Mochizuki	3	6^{4}
Q	(Japan) T Ichikawa	6^{5}	4
(United States) Christian Langmo	7^{7}	6
(Australia) A Bolt	3	2
2	(Japan) Y Shimizu	6	6

Second round
7	(Australia) J McCabe	6	6
(Australia) L Saville	4	4
Alt	(Japan) M Ochi	3	6	2
4	(Australia) D Sweeny	6	4	6
6	(Japan) Y Uchiyama	3	6	6
WC	(Australia) M Hulme	6	3	4
(United States) C Langmo	6	7^{7}
2	(Japan) Y Shimizu	3	6^{1}

Quarterfinals
7	(Australia) J McCabe	1	6	4
4	(Australia) D Sweeny	6	2	6
6	(Japan) Y Uchiyama	6	6
(United States) C Langmo	2	2

Semifinals
4	(Australia) D Sweeny	6	3
6	(Japan) Y Uchiyama	2	1^{r}
