= 2023 Burnie International – Men's singles =

Men's singles
- 2023 Burnie International

Final
- Champion: (Australia) Rinky Hijikata
- Runner-up: (Australia) James Duckworth
- Score: 6–3, 6–3

Events
Singles	men	women
Doubles	men	women
- Burnie International

Taro Daniel was the defending champion but chose not to defend his title.

Rinky Hijikata won the title after defeating James Duckworth 6–3, 6–3 in the final.

== Seeds ==
1. (Australia) James Duckworth (final)
2. (Australia) Rinky Hijikata (champion)
3. (Australia) Max Purcell (second round)
4. (Japan) Rio Noguchi (first round)
5. (Australia) Omar Jasika (first round)
6. (Australia) Dane Sweeny (first round)
7. (Japan) Hiroki Moriya (second round)
8. (Japan) Yasutaka Uchiyama (first round)

== Draw ==
Key

- Q = Qualifier
- WC = Wild card
- LL = Lucky loser
- Alt = Alternate
- ITF = ITF entry
- PR = Protected ranking
- SR = Special ranking
- SE = Special exempt
- JE = Junior exempt
- JR = Junior Accelerator Programme entrant
- CO = College Accelerator Programme entrant
- NG = Next Gen Accelerator Program entrant
- w/o = Walkover
- r = Retired
- d = Defaulted

=== Finals ===
Semifinals
1	(Australia) James Duckworth	7	4	6
(Australia) Marc Polmans	5	6	2
(Japan) Yuta Shimizu	1	4
2	(Australia) Rinky Hijikata	6	6

Final
1	(Australia) James Duckworth	3	3
2	(Australia) Rinky Hijikata	6	6

=== Top half ===
First round
1	(Australia) J Duckworth	6	6
(Japan) Makoto Ochi	1	4
Q	(Australia) Ja Delaney	7	7^{7}
WC	(Australia) Jeremy Jin	5	6^{5}
Q	(Australia) MC Romios	5	1
(Australia) P Sekulic	7	6
Q	(Japan) Daisuke Sumizawa	3	3
7	(Japan) H Moriya	6	6
3	(Australia) M Purcell	6	7
WC	(Australia) A Bolt	2	5
(Australia) M Polmans	6	6
Q	(Australia) B Walkin	2	4
(Australia) A Walton	7	6
(Japan) Yuki Mochizuki	5	1
(Japan) Shuichi Sekiguchi	6	6
6	(Australia) D Sweeny	2	4

Second round
1	(Australia) J Duckworth	6	3	6
Q	(Australia) Ja Delaney	1	6	1
(Australia) P Sekulic	7^{7}	6^{4}	7^{7}
7	(Japan) H Moriya	6^{2}	7^{7}	6^{5}
3	(Australia) M Purcell	4	6	3
(Australia) M Polmans	6	2	6
(Australia) A Walton	6	6
(Japan) S Sekiguchi	3	2

Quarterfinals
1	(Australia) J Duckworth	6	6^{4}	7
(Australia) P Sekulic	2	7^{7}	5
(Australia) M Polmans	6	6
(Australia) A Walton	3	3

Semifinals
1	(Australia) J Duckworth	7	4	6
(Australia) M Polmans	5	6	2

=== Bottom half ===
First round
8	(Japan) Y Uchiyama	6	6^{4}	5
(Australia) T Fancutt	3	7^{7}	7
(Japan) S Hazawa	6	2	7^{7}
Q	(Australia) Charlie Camus	4	6	6^{4}
(France) M Chazal	2	4
(Japan) Y Shimizu	6	6
(Australia) T Schoolkate	6	2	6
4	(Japan) R Noguchi	3	6	1
5	(Australia) O Jasika	3	6^{1}
(Australia) J McCabe	6	7^{7}
(Australia) D Kelly	3	6	6
(Japan) N Nakagawa	6	2	3
WC	(Australia) B Ellis	6	7
(Australia) L Saville	4	5
Q	(Japan) Y Takahashi	3	2
2	(Australia) R Hijikata	6	6

Second round
(Australia) T Fancutt	4	6	6
(Japan) S Hazawa	6	3	3
(Japan) Y Shimizu	6	6
(Australia) T Schoolkate	1	3
(Australia) J McCabe	7^{7}	6
(Australia) D Kelly	6^{3}	0
WC	(Australia) B Ellis	1	3
2	(Australia) R Hijikata	6	6

Quarterfinals
(Australia) T Fancutt	4	1
(Japan) Y Shimizu	6	6
(Australia) J McCabe	5	2
2	(Australia) R Hijikata	7	6

Semifinals
(Japan) Y Shimizu	1	4
2	(Australia) R Hijikata	6	6
