= 2024 Burnie International II =

- Date: 5 – 11 February
- Edition: 20th (men); 14th (women)
- Category: ATP Challenger Tour; ITF Women's World Tennis Tour
- Surface: Hard
- Location: Burnie, Australia

Champions

Men's singles
- (Australia) Adam Walton

Women's singles
- (Australia) Maya Joint

Men's doubles
- (Zimbabwe) Benjamin Lock / (Japan) Yuta Shimizu

Women's doubles
- (China) Tang Qianhui / (China) You Xiaodi
← 2024 ·	Burnie International	· 2025 →

The 2024 Burnie International II was a professional tennis tournament played on outdoor hard courts. It was the 20th (men) and 14th (women) editions of the tournament which was part of the 2024 ATP Challenger Tour and the 2024 ITF Women's World Tennis Tour. It took place in Burnie, Australia between 5 and 11 February 2024.

== Champions ==
=== Men's singles ===
- (Australia) Adam Walton def. (Australia) Dane Sweeny 6–2, 7–6^{(7–4)}.

=== Women's singles ===
- (Australia) Maya Joint def. (Japan) Aoi Ito, 1–6, 6–1, 7–5

=== Men's doubles ===
- (Zimbabwe) Benjamin Lock / (Japan) Yuta Shimizu def. (Australia) Blake Bayldon / (Australia) Kody Pearson 6–4, 7–6^{(7–4)}.

=== Women's doubles ===
- (China) Tang Qianhui / (China) You Xiaodi def. (China) Ma Yexin / (Australia) Alana Parnaby, 6–4, 7–5

== Men's singles main-draw entrants ==
=== Seeds ===
Country	Player	Rank^{1}	Seed
AUS	Adam Walton	177	1
JPN	Yuta Shimizu	212	2
AUS	Li Tu	215	3
AUS	Dane Sweeny	233	4
AUS	Tristan Schoolkate	257	5
JPN	Yasutaka Uchiyama	268	6
AUS	James McCabe	270	7
AUS	Philip Sekulic	273	8

- ^{1} Rankings are as of 29 January 2024.

=== Other entrants ===
The following players received wildcards into the singles main draw:

- (Australia) Jake Delaney
- (Australia) Matt Hulme
- (Australia) Hayden Jones

The following player received entry into the singles main draw as an alternate:

- (Japan) Makoto Ochi

The following players received entry from the qualifying draw:

- (Japan) Taisei Ichikawa
- (United States) Andre Ilagan
- (Japan) Masamichi Imamura
- (Japan) Takuya Kumasaka
- (Japan) Yuki Mochizuki
- (Australia) Calum Puttergill

The following player received entry as a lucky loser:

- (Australia) Jacob Bradshaw

== Women's singles main-draw entrants ==
=== Seeds ===
Country	Player	Rank^{1}	Seed
CZE	Gabriela Knutson	158	1
AUS	Priscilla Hon	201	2
AUS	Destanee Aiava	202	3
CHN	Ma Yexin	205	4
CHN	Wei Sijia	215	5
AUS	Jaimee Fourlis	219	6
CHN	You Xiaodi	224	7
THA	Mananchaya Sawangkaew	260	8

- ^{1} Rankings are as of 29 January 2024.

=== Other entrants ===
The following players received wildcards into the singles main draw:

- (Australia) Maya Joint
- (Australia) Emerson Jones
- (Australia) Elena Micic

The following player received entry using a special ranking:

- (Romania) Irina Fetecău

The following players received entry from the qualifying draw:

- (Australia) Melisa Ercan
- (Japan) Miho Kuramochi
- (Japan) Mio Mushika
- (Japan) Yuki Naito
- (Australia) Alana Parnaby
- (Australia) Ivana Popovic
- (Japan) Erika Sema
- (Japan) Ena Shibahara
