= 2020 Burnie International – Men's doubles =

Men's doubles
- 2020 Burnie International

Final
- Champions: (Finland) Harri Heliövaara (Netherlands) Sem Verbeek
- Runners-up: (Switzerland) Luca Margaroli (Italy) Andrea Vavassori
- Score: 7–6^{(7–5)}, 7–6^{(7–4)}

Events
Singles	men	women
Doubles	men	women
← 2019 ·	Burnie International	· 2023 →

Lloyd Harris and Dudi Sela were the defending champions but chose not to defend their title.

Harri Heliövaara and Sem Verbeek won the title after defeating Luca Margaroli and Andrea Vavassori 7–6^{(7–5)}, 7–6^{(7–4)} in the final.

== Seeds ==
1. (Ukraine) Denys Molchanov / (Belarus) Andrei Vasilevski (first round)
2. (Spain) Gerard Granollers / (Spain) David Vega Hernández (first round)
3. (Switzerland) Luca Margaroli / (Italy) Andrea Vavassori (final)
4. (Finland) Harri Heliövaara / (Netherlands) Sem Verbeek (champions)

== Draw ==
Key

- Q = Qualifier
- WC = Wild card
- LL = Lucky loser
- Alt = Alternate
- ITF = ITF entry
- PR = Protected ranking
- SR = Special ranking
- SE = Special exempt
- JE = Junior exempt
- JR = Junior Accelerator Programme entrant
- CO = College Accelerator Programme entrant
- NG = Next Gen Accelerator Program entrant
- w/o = Walkover
- r = Retired
- d = Defaulted

First round
1	(Ukraine) D Molchanov (Belarus) A Vasilevski	1	4
(United States) N Pasha (United States) M Schnur	6	6
(Germany) J Lenz (Germany) Y Maden	6	6
(United States) E King (Zimbabwe) B Lock	2	3
3	(Switzerland) L Margaroli (Italy) A Vavassori	6	6
WC	(Australia) T Schoolkate (Australia) D Sweeny	2	4
(Belgium) K Coppejans (Spain) S Martos Gornés	6	6
(United Kingdom) L Broady (United Kingdom) J Clarke	4	4
WC	(Australia) H Bourchier (Australia) A Santillan	4	2
PR	(Slovenia) B Kavčič (Egypt) M Safwat	6	6
WC	(Australia) C Guccione (Australia) M Reid	2	7	[6]
4	(Finland) H Heliövaara (Netherlands) S Verbeek	6	5	[10]
(France) S Doumbia (France) F Reboul	6	4	[10]
(Canada) S Diez (Netherlands) M Vervoort	1	6	[6]
(Croatia) B Gojo (China) Z Li	1	7	[10]
2	(Spain) G Granollers (Spain) D Vega Hernández	6	5	[6]

Quarterfinals
(United States) N Pasha (United States) M Schnur	6	6^{5}	[10]
(Germany) J Lenz (Germany) Y Maden	3	7^{7}	[7]
3	(Switzerland) L Margaroli (Italy) A Vavassori	6	7^{7}
(Belgium) K Coppejans (Spain) S Martos Gornés	2	6^{4}
PR	(Slovenia) B Kavčič (Egypt) M Safwat	2	1
4	(Finland) H Heliövaara (Netherlands) S Verbeek	6	6
(France) S Doumbia (France) F Reboul	6^{3}	5
(Croatia) B Gojo (China) Z Li	7^{7}	7

Semifinals
(United States) N Pasha (United States) M Schnur	6^{2}	4
3	(Switzerland) L Margaroli (Italy) A Vavassori	7^{7}	6
4	(Finland) H Heliövaara (Netherlands) S Verbeek	7^{11}	6
(Croatia) B Gojo (China) Z Li	6^{9}	3

Final
3	(Switzerland) L Margaroli (Italy) A Vavassori	6^{5}	6^{4}
4	(Finland) H Heliövaara (Netherlands) S Verbeek	7^{7}	7^{7}
