= 2020 Burnie International =

- Date: 27 January–2 February 2020
- Edition: 17th (men); 11th (women)
- Category: ATP Challenger Tour; ITF Women's World Tennis Tour
- Prize money: $54,160 (men) $60,000 (women)
- Surface: Hard
- Location: Burnie, Australia

Champions

Men's singles
- (Japan) Taro Daniel

Women's singles
- (Australia) Maddison Inglis

Men's doubles
- (Finland) Harri Heliövaara / (Netherlands) Sem Verbeek

Women's doubles
- (Australia) Ellen Perez / (Australia) Storm Sanders
| ← 2019 · | Burnie International | · 2023 → |

The 2020 Burnie International was a professional tennis tournament played on outdoor hard courts. It was the seventeenth (men) and eleventh (women) editions of the tournament which was part of the 2020 ATP Challenger Tour and the 2020 ITF Women's World Tennis Tour. It took place in Burnie, Australia between 27 January and 2 February 2020.

== Men's singles main-draw entrants ==
=== Seeds ===
| Country | Player | Rank^{1} | Seed |
|---|---|---|---|
| JPN | Taro Daniel | 110 | 1 |
| GER | Yannick Maden | 125 | 2 |
| CAN | Steven Diez | 134 | 3 |
| AUS | Alex Bolt | 140 | 4 |
| ITA | Lorenzo Giustino | 150 | 5 |
| GBR | Jay Clarke | 155 | 6 |
| SRB | Nikola Milojević | 156 | 7 |
| BEL | Kimmer Coppejans | 158 | 8 |
| AUS | Andrew Harris | 162 | 9 |
| GER | Yannick Hanfmann | 167 | 10 |
| EGY | Mohamed Safwat | 173 | 11 |
| CHN | Li Zhe | 206 | 12 |
| TPE | Wu Tung-lin | 232 | 13 |
| KOR | Lee Duck-hee | 236 | 14 |
| GBR | Liam Broady | 237 | 15 |
| GER | Julian Lenz | 238 | 16 |

- ^{1} Rankings are as of 20 January 2020.

=== Other entrants ===
The following players received wildcards into the singles main draw:

- (Australia) Alexander Crnokrak
- (Australia) Blake Ellis
- (Australia) Matthew Romios
- (Australia) Tristan Schoolkate
- (Australia) Dane Sweeny

The following player received entry into the singles main draw as an alternate:

- (Italy) Liam Caruana

The following players received entry from the qualifying draw:

- (Japan) Takuto Niki
- (Greece) Petros Tsitsipas

== Women's singles main-draw entrants ==
=== Seeds ===
| Country | Player | Rank^{1} | Seed |
|---|---|---|---|
| ESP | Sara Sorribes Tormo | 91 | 1 |
| ESP | Paula Badosa | 97 | 2 |
| AUS | Lizette Cabrera | 121 | 3 |
| AUS | Maddison Inglis | 130 | 4 |
| USA | Sachia Vickery | 150 | 5 |
| RUS | Kamilla Rakhimova | 190 | 6 |
| GBR | Naiktha Bains | 201 | 7 |
| USA | Asia Muhammad | 216 | 8 |

- ^{1} Rankings are as of 20 January 2020.

=== Other entrants ===
The following players received wildcards into the singles main draw:

- (Australia) Isabella Bozicevic
- (Australia) Alexandra Bozovic
- (Australia) Ellen Perez
- (Australia) Ivana Popovic

The following players received entry from the qualifying draw:

- (Japan) Mana Ayukawa
- (Australia) Gabriella Da Silva-Fick
- (Japan) Nagi Hanatani
- (Japan) Mai Hontama
- (New Zealand) Paige Hourigan
- (Australia) Amber Marshall
- (France) Irina Ramialison
- (Japan) Himari Satō

The following player received entry as a lucky loser:

- (New Zealand) Erin Routliffe

== Champions ==
=== Men's singles ===
- (Japan) Taro Daniel def. (Germany) Yannick Hanfmann 6–2, 6–2.

=== Women's singles ===
- (Australia) Maddison Inglis def. (United States) Sachia Vickery, 2–6, 6–3, 7–5

=== Men's doubles ===
- (Finland) Harri Heliövaara / (Netherlands) Sem Verbeek def. (Switzerland) Luca Margaroli / (Italy) Andrea Vavassori 7–6^{(7–5)}, 7–6^{(7–4)}.

=== Women's doubles ===
- (Australia) Ellen Perez / (Australia) Storm Sanders def. (United States) Desirae Krawczyk / (United States) Asia Muhammad, 6–3, 6–2
