= 2024 Burnie International – Women's singles =

Women's singles
- 2024 Burnie International

Final
- Champion: (Australia) Priscilla Hon
- Runner-up: (Japan) Sara Saito
- Score: 6–3, 6–0

Events
Singles	men	women
Doubles	men	women
← 2023 ·	Burnie International	· 2024 →

Storm Hunter was the defending champion but chose not to defend her title.

Priscilla Hon won the title, defeating Sara Saito in the final, 6–3, 6–0.

== Seeds ==
1. (Czech Republic) Gabriela Knutson (first round)
2. (Australia) Priscilla Hon (champion)
3. (Australia) Destanee Aiava (second round)
4. (Australia) Jaimee Fourlis (second round)
5. (China) Ma Yexin (first round)
6. (China) You Xiaodi (second round)
7. (China) Wei Sijia (first round)
8. (Thailand) Mananchaya Sawangkaew (quarterfinals)

== Draw ==
=== Key ===
- Q = Qualifier
- WC = Wild card
- LL = Lucky loser
- Alt = Alternate
- SE = Special exempt
- PR = Protected ranking
- ITF = ITF entry
- JE = Junior exempt
- w/o = Walkover
- r = Retired
- d = Defaulted
- SR = Special ranking

=== Finals ===
Semifinals
(Japan) Aoi Ito	5	0
(Japan) Sara Saito	7	6
Q	(Japan) Ena Shibahara	6^{3}	4
2	(Australia) Priscilla Hon	7^{7}	6

Final
(Japan) Sara Saito	3	0
2	(Australia) Priscilla Hon	6	6

=== Top half ===
First round
1	(Czech Republic) G Knutson	3	3
(Japan) A Ito	6	6
JE	(Slovakia) R Jamrichová	2	0^{r}
(United Kingdom) A Banks	6	2
SR	(Romania) I Fetecău	6	5	6
Q	(Australia) E Micic	0	7	2
(Japan) S Hosogi	2	7^{7}	6
5	(China) Y Ma	6	6^{3}	0
3	(Australia) D Aiava	6	6
Q	(Japan) E Sema	1	2
(Australia) TN Smith	4	1
(Japan) S Saito	6	6
Q	(Australia) G Da Silva-Fick	4	2
Q	(Japan) Y Naito	6	6
(Japan) A Shimizu	3	2
6	(China) X You	6	6

Second round
(Japan) A Ito	6	6
(United Kingdom) A Banks	1	4
SR	(Romania) I Fetecău	1	1
(Japan) S Hosogi	6	6
3	(Australia) D Aiava	3	5
(Japan) S Saito	6	7
Q	(Japan) Y Naito	6	0	6
6	(China) X You	4	6	4

Quarterfinals
(Japan) A Ito	6	3	7
(Japan) S Hosogi	2	6	5
(Japan) S Saito	6	6
Q	(Japan) Y Naito	2	1

Semifinals
(Japan) A Ito	5	0
(Japan) S Saito	7	6

=== Bottom half ===
First round
7	(China) S Wei	2	6^{5}
Q	(Japan) E Shibahara	6	7^{7}
(Australia) L Cabrera	3	0
Q	(Japan) M Kuramochi	6	6
(Japan) H Kaji	1	6^{4}
WC	(Australia) M Joint	6	7^{7}
Q	(Spain) K Quevedo	4	6	6^{6}
4	(Australia) J Fourlis	6	1	7^{8}
8	(Thailand) M Sawangkaew	6	6
Q	(Australia) A Parnaby	2	0
(Japan) K Okamura	6^{4}	4
WC	(Australia) I Popovic	7^{7}	6
(United Kingdom) K Swan	6	1	5
(Australia) P Hule	4	6	7
(Australia) K McPhee	1	7	2
2	(Australia) P Hon	6	5	6

Second round
Q	(Japan) E Shibahara	6	3	6
Q	(Japan) M Kuramochi	2	6	3
WC	(Australia) M Joint	6	6
4	(Australia) J Fourlis	2	2
8	(Thailand) M Sawangkaew	6	2	7^{16}
WC	(Australia) I Popovic	4	6	6^{14}
(Australia) P Hule	3	3
2	(Australia) P Hon	6	6

Quarterfinals
Q	(Japan) E Shibahara	6	4	7^{12}
WC	(Australia) M Joint	4	6	6^{10}
8	(Thailand) M Sawangkaew	6	0	2
2	(Australia) P Hon	4	6	6

Semifinals
Q	(Japan) E Shibahara	6^{3}	4
2	(Australia) P Hon	7^{7}	6
