= 2024 Burnie International – Men's singles =

Men's singles
- 2024 Burnie International

Final
- Champion: (Australia) Omar Jasika
- Runner-up: (Australia) Alex Bolt
- Score: 6–2, 6–7^{(2–7)}, 6–3

Events
Singles	men	women
Doubles	men	women
- Burnie International

Rinky Hijikata was the defending champion but lost in the second round to Omar Jasika.

Jasika won the title after defeating Alex Bolt 6–2, 6–7^{(2–7)}, 6–3 in the final.

== Seeds ==
1. (Australia) Rinky Hijikata (second round)
2. (Australia) Marc Polmans (quarterfinals)
3. (Australia) Adam Walton (second round)
4. (Australia) Tristan Schoolkate (first round)
5. (Australia) Dane Sweeny (quarterfinals)
6. (Japan) Yasutaka Uchiyama (semifinals)
7. (Australia) James McCabe (second round)
8. (Australia) Philip Sekulic (second round)

== Draw ==
Key

- Q = Qualifier
- WC = Wild card
- LL = Lucky loser
- Alt = Alternate
- ITF = ITF entry
- PR = Protected ranking
- SR = Special ranking
- SE = Special exempt
- JE = Junior exempt
- JR = Junior Accelerator Programme entrant
- CO = College Accelerator Programme entrant
- NG = Next Gen Accelerator Program entrant
- w/o = Walkover
- r = Retired
- d = Defaulted

=== Finals ===
Semifinals
(Australia) Omar Jasika	7	6
Q	(Japan) Shintaro Imai	5	3
(Australia) Alex Bolt	6^{7}	7^{7}	6
6	(Japan) Yasutaka Uchiyama	7^{9}	6^{4}	3

Final
(Australia) Omar Jasika	6	6^{2}	6
(Australia) Alex Bolt	2	7^{7}	3

=== Top half ===
First round
1	(Australia) R Hijikata	6	6
Q	(Japan) Takuya Kumasaka	4	2
Q	(Australia) Scott Jones	4	4
(Australia) O Jasika	6	6
(Japan) R Noguchi	6	6
(Australia) B Mott	1	4
WC	(Australia) M Bouzige	3	2
5	(Australia) D Sweeny	6	6
4	(Australia) T Schoolkate	3	0
(Australia) L Saville	6	6
Q	(Japan) Yuki Mochizuki	6	5	2
WC	(Australia) H Jones	4	7	6
Q	(Japan) K Isomura	6	2	3
Q	(Japan) Shintaro Imai	2	6	6
(Australia) B Ellis	3	4
8	(Australia) P Sekulic	6	6

Second round
1	(Australia) R Hijikata	7	4	4
(Australia) O Jasika	5	6	6
(Japan) R Noguchi	3	4
5	(Australia) D Sweeny	6	6
(Australia) L Saville	7	4	6
WC	(Australia) H Jones	5	6	3
Q	(Japan) S Imai	6^{9}	7	6
8	(Australia) P Sekulic	7^{11}	5	3

Quarterfinals
(Australia) O Jasika	6	6
5	(Australia) D Sweeny	3	3
(Australia) L Saville	4	6^{4}
Q	(Japan) S Imai	6	7^{7}

Semifinals
(Australia) O Jasika	7	6
Q	(Japan) S Imai	5	3

=== Bottom half ===
First round
7	(Australia) J McCabe	6	6
(Australia) Matthew Dellavedova	0	2
(Japan) H Moriya	6	6
(France) M Chazal	3	1
(Greece) S Sakellaridis	0	3
(Australia) A Bolt	6	6
Q	(Australia) M Hulme	6^{3}	4
3	(Australia) A Walton	7^{7}	6
6	(Japan) Y Uchiyama	6	6
(Australia) J Delaney	3	1
WC	(Australia) Jacob Bradshaw	6^{2}	6^{3}
(Japan) Y Takahashi	7^{7}	7^{7}
(United States) Christian Langmo	6	5	6^{6}
Mikalai Haliak	3	7	7^{8}
(Japan) Makoto Ochi	2	1
2	(Australia) M Polmans	6	6

Second round
7	(Australia) J McCabe	2	3
(Japan) H Moriya	6	6
(Australia) A Bolt	6	6
3	(Australia) A Walton	3	2
6	(Japan) Y Uchiyama	6	6
(Japan) Y Takahashi	2	4
M Haliak	3	6	6^{9}
2	(Australia) M Polmans	6	4	7^{11}

Quarterfinals
(Japan) H Moriya	6	6^{5}	2
(Australia) A Bolt	2	7^{7}	6
6	(Japan) Y Uchiyama	3	6	6
2	(Australia) M Polmans	6	3	4

Semifinals
(Australia) A Bolt	6^{7}	7^{7}	6
6	(Japan) Y Uchiyama	7^{9}	6^{4}	3
