= 2026 Queensland International – Men's singles =

Men's singles
- 2026 Queensland International

Final
- Champion: (Australia) Dane Sweeny
- Runner-up: (Australia) Tristan Schoolkate
- Score: 3–6, 7–6^{(7–5)}, 7–6^{(7–4)}

Events
Singles	men	women
Doubles	men	women
- Queensland International

Alex Bolt was the defending champion but lost in the quarterfinals to Yasutaka Uchiyama.

Dane Sweeny won the title after defeating Tristan Schoolkate 3–6, 7–6^{(7–5)}, 7–6^{(7–4)} in the final.

== Seeds ==
1. (Australia) Adam Walton (first round)
2. (Australia) Tristan Schoolkate (final)
3. (Australia) Alex Bolt (quarterfinals)
4. (Australia) James McCabe (quarterfinals)
5. (Australia) Dane Sweeny (champion)
6. (Japan) Rei Sakamoto (quarterfinals)
7. (China) Sun Fajing (second round)
8. (Japan) Yasutaka Uchiyama (semifinals)

== Draw ==
Key

- Q = Qualifier
- WC = Wild card
- LL = Lucky loser
- Alt = Alternate
- ITF = ITF entry
- PR = Protected ranking
- SR = Special ranking
- SE = Special exempt
- JE = Junior exempt
- JR = Junior Accelerator Programme entrant
- CO = College Accelerator Programme entrant
- NG = Next Gen Accelerator Program entrant
- w/o = Walkover
- r = Retired
- d = Defaulted

=== Finals ===
Semifinals
5	(Australia) Dane Sweeny	6	6
8	(Japan) Yasutaka Uchiyama	3	3
(Australia) Blake Ellis	4	4
2	(Australia) Tristan Schoolkate	6	6

Final
5	(Australia) Dane Sweeny	3	7^{7}	7^{7}
2	(Australia) Tristan Schoolkate	6	6^{5}	6^{4}

=== Top half ===
First round
1	(Australia) A Walton	6	3	4
Q	(Japan) N Nakagawa	4	6	6
WC	(Australia) C Hewitt	6	7^{7}
(Japan) H Matsuoka	3	6^{5}
WC	(Australia) Tai Sach	6	7^{8}
(Australia) O Jasika	4	6^{6}
Q	(Japan) S Mitsui	2^{r}
5	(Australia) D Sweeny	3
3	(Australia) A Bolt	4	6	6
(France) C Denolly	6	3	2
(Japan) Y Shimizu	7^{7}	1	6
(Japan) Renta Tokuda	6^{4}	6	4
(United States) Dar Blanch	6^{5}	6	3
Q	(Australia) Pavle Marinkov	7^{7}	3	6
(Japan) H Moriya	2	1
8	(Japan) Y Uchiyama	6	6

Second round
Q	(Japan) N Nakagawa	4	6	1
WC	(Australia) C Hewitt	6	3	6
WC	(Australia) T Sach	1	1
5	(Australia) D Sweeny	6	6
3	(Australia) A Bolt	6	6
(Japan) Y Shimizu	3	4
Q	(Australia) P Marinkov	4	6	1
8	(Japan) Y Uchiyama	6	3	6

Quarterfinals
WC	(Australia) C Hewitt	1	1
5	(Australia) D Sweeny	6	6
3	(Australia) A Bolt	2	7^{11}	2
8	(Japan) Y Uchiyama	6	6^{9}	6

Semifinals
5	(Australia) D Sweeny	6	6
8	(Japan) Y Uchiyama	3	3

=== Bottom half ===
First round
7	(China) F Sun	6	6
(Spain) D Jordà Sanchis	4	3
(Australia) B Ellis	7^{7}	7^{8}
(Japan) Hikaru Shiraishi	6^{5}	6^{6}
Alt	(Australia) Matthew Dellavedova	2	2
Q	(Japan) S Hazawa	6	6
Q	(Japan) K Isomura	2	3
4	(Australia) J McCabe	6	6
6	(Japan) R Sakamoto	6	6
WC	(Australia) P Sekulic	3	4
(Australia) Ja Delaney	3	5
(Japan) T Daniel	6	7
Q	(Australia) M Hulme	6	3	5
(Australia) L Tu	3	6	7
(Australia) M Bouzige	6^{4}	2
2	(Australia) T Schoolkate	7^{7}	6

Second round
7	(China) F Sun	6^{5}	4
(Australia) B Ellis	7^{7}	6
Q	(Japan) S Hazawa	4	4
4	(Australia) J McCabe	6	6
6	(Japan) R Sakamoto	7^{7}	6
(Japan) T Daniel	6^{5}	2
(Australia) L Tu	3	4
2	(Australia) T Schoolkate	6	6

Quarterfinals
(Australia) B Ellis	6^{6}	6	6
4	(Australia) J McCabe	7^{8}	4	3
6	(Japan) R Sakamoto	3	4
2	(Australia) T Schoolkate	6	6

Semifinals
(Australia) B Ellis	4	4
2	(Australia) T Schoolkate	6	6
