= 2020 Burnie International – Men's singles =

Men's singles
- 2020 Burnie International

Final
- Champion: (Japan) Taro Daniel
- Runner-up: (Germany) Yannick Hanfmann
- Score: 6–2, 6–2

Events
Singles	men	women
Doubles	men	women
- Burnie International

Steven Diez was the defending champion but lost in the second round to Jason Kubler.

Taro Daniel won the title after defeating Yannick Hanfmann 6–2, 6–2 in the final.

== Seeds ==
All seeds receive a bye into the second round.

1. (Japan) Taro Daniel (champion)
2. (Germany) Yannick Maden (third round)
3. (Canada) Steven Diez (second round)
4. (Australia) Alex Bolt (quarterfinals)
5. (Italy) Lorenzo Giustino (third round)
6. (United Kingdom) Jay Clarke (semifinals)
7. (Serbia) Nikola Milojević (third round)
8. (Belgium) Kimmer Coppejans (third round)
9. (Australia) Andrew Harris (second round)
10. (Germany) Yannick Hanfmann (final)
11. (Egypt) Mohamed Safwat (quarterfinals)
12. (China) Li Zhe (quarterfinals)
13. (Chinese Taipei) Wu Tung-lin (third round)
14. (South Korea) Lee Duck-hee (third round)
15. (United Kingdom) Liam Broady (second round)
16. (Germany) Julian Lenz (second round)

== Draw ==
Key

- Q = Qualifier
- WC = Wild card
- LL = Lucky loser
- Alt = Alternate
- ITF = ITF entry
- PR = Protected ranking
- SR = Special ranking
- SE = Special exempt
- JE = Junior exempt
- JR = Junior Accelerator Programme entrant
- CO = College Accelerator Programme entrant
- NG = Next Gen Accelerator Program entrant
- w/o = Walkover
- r = Retired
- d = Defaulted

=== Finals ===
Quarterfinals
1	(Japan) Taro Daniel	6	6
11	(Egypt) Mohamed Safwat	3	2
4	(Australia) Alex Bolt	6	5	2
6	(United Kingdom) Jay Clarke	4	7	6
12	(China) Li Zhe	6^{6}	6	2
(Australia) Jason Kubler	7^{8}	4	6
10	(Germany) Yannick Hanfmann	6	6
(Greece) Michail Pervolarakis	4	1

Semifinals
1	(Japan) Taro Daniel	6	6
6	(United Kingdom) Jay Clarke	3	1
(Australia) Jason Kubler	4	1
10	(Germany) Yannick Hanfmann	6	6

Final
1	(Japan) Taro Daniel	6	6
10	(Germany) Yannick Hanfmann	2	2

=== Top half ===
==== Section 1 ====
First round
(Croatia) V Galović	1	6^{5}
(Japan) Y Shimizu	6	7^{7}
(United States) Evan Song	6	7^{9}
(Canada) F Peliwo	2	6^{7}
(Croatia) B Gojo	6	6
(Argentina) MF Descotte	1	3
(Australia) M Banes	3	6^{6}
(Australia) H Bourchier	6	7^{8}

Second round
1	(Japan) T Daniel	7^{7}	7^{7}
(Japan) Y Shimizu	6^{4}	6^{5}
(United States) E Song	0	3
13	(Chinese Taipei) T-l Wu	6	6
11	(Egypt) M Safwat	3	7	6
(Croatia) B Gojo	6	5	3
(Australia) H Bourchier	7	3	4
8	(Belgium) K Coppejans	5	6	6

Third round
1	(Japan) T Daniel	6	6
13	(Chinese Taipei) T-l Wu	4	4
11	(Egypt) M Safwat	3	6	6
8	(Belgium) K Coppejans	6	3	4

Quarterfinals
1	(Japan) T Daniel	6	6
11	(Egypt) M Safwat	3	2

==== Section 2 ====
First round
Q	(Japan) T Niki	5	3
Alt	(Italy) L Caruana	7	6
(Australia) B Mott	2	4
(United States) E King	6	6
(Germany) D Altmaier	5	6	6
WC	(Australia) Alexander Crnokrak	7	4	4
(United Kingdom) B Klein	6	4	6
WC	(Australia) M Romios	3	6	2

Second round
4	(Australia) A Bolt	7	7
Alt	(Italy) L Caruana	5	5
(United States) E King	4	3
14	(South Korea) D-h Lee	6	6
9	(Australia) A Harris	3	4
(Germany) D Altmaier	6	6
(United Kingdom) B Klein	6	3	4
6	(United Kingdom) J Clarke	1	6	6

Third round
4	(Australia) A Bolt	6	6
14	(South Korea) D-h Lee	3	2
(Germany) D Altmaier	1	7^{7}	4
6	(United Kingdom) J Clarke	6	6^{5}	6

Quarterfinals
4	(Australia) A Bolt	6	5	2
6	(United Kingdom) J Clarke	4	7	6

=== Bottom half ===
==== Section 3 ====
First round
(Italy) A Vavassori	7	4	6
WC	(Australia) D Sweeny	5	6	0
(Australia) D Kelly	2	7^{7}	4
(Australia) Jacob Grills	6	6^{4}	6
(France) S Doumbia	2	5
(Slovenia) B Kavčič	6	7
(Australia) J Kubler	6	6
WC	(Australia) B Ellis	4	4

Second round
5	(Italy) L Giustino	6	6
(Italy) A Vavassori	3	3
(Australia) J Grills	1	0
12	(China) Z Li	6	6
16	(Germany) J Lenz	4	4
(Slovenia) B Kavčič	6	6
(Australia) J Kubler	4	6	6
3	(Canada) S Diez	6	3	2

Third round
5	(Italy) L Giustino	4	2
12	(China) Z Li	6	6
(Slovenia) B Kavčič	7^{9}	4	4
(Australia) J Kubler	6^{7}	6	6

Quarterfinals
12	(China) Z Li	6^{6}	6	2
(Australia) J Kubler	7^{8}	4	6

==== Section 4 ====
First round
(Zimbabwe) B Lock	4	6	6
Q	(Greece) Pe Tsitsipas	6	2	2
(Australia) A Santillan	4	3
WC	(Australia) T Schoolkate	6	6
(Greece) M Pervolarakis	6	6
(Germany) Tobias Simon	3	4
(Australia) T Fancutt	4	6^{4}
(Japan) R Noguchi	6	7^{7}

Second round
7	(Serbia) N Milojević	6	6
(Zimbabwe) B Lock	1	4
WC	(Australia) T Schoolkate	2	3
10	(Germany) Y Hanfmann	6	6
15	(United Kingdom) L Broady	0	6	6^{1}
(Greece) M Pervolarakis	6	3	7^{7}
(Japan) R Noguchi	2	2
2	(Germany) Y Maden	6	6

Third round
7	(Serbia) N Milojević	4	4
10	(Germany) Y Hanfmann	6	6
(Greece) M Pervolarakis	6	6
2	(Germany) Y Maden	1	0

Quarterfinals
10	(Germany) Y Hanfmann	6	6
(Greece) M Pervolarakis	4	1
