= 2020 Burnie International – Women's doubles =

Women's doubles
- 2020 Burnie International

Final
- Champions: (Australia) Ellen Perez (Australia) Storm Sanders
- Runners-up: (United States) Desirae Krawczyk (United States) Asia Muhammad
- Score: 6–3, 6–2

Events
Singles	men	women
Doubles	men	women
← 2019 ·	Burnie International	· 2023 →

Ellen Perez and Arina Rodionova were the defending champions but Rodionova chose not to participate.

Perez partnered alongside Storm Sanders and successfully defended her title, defeating Desirae Krawczyk and Asia Muhammad in the final, 6–3, 6–2.

== Seeds ==
1. (United States) Desirae Krawczyk / (United States) Asia Muhammad (final)
2. (Australia) Ellen Perez / (Australia) Storm Sanders (champions)
3. (New Zealand) Erin Routliffe / (Hungary) Fanny Stollár (quarterfinals)
4. (Australia) Alison Bai / (Australia) Jaimee Fourlis (first round)

== Draw ==
=== Key ===
- Q = Qualifier
- WC = Wild card
- LL = Lucky loser
- Alt = Alternate
- SE = Special exempt
- PR = Protected ranking
- ITF = ITF entry
- JE = Junior exempt
- w/o = Walkover
- r = Retired
- d = Defaulted
- SR = Special ranking

=== Draw ===
First round
1	(United States) D Krawczyk (United States) A Muhammad	3	6	[11]
(Japan) N Hanatani (Australia) A Parnaby	6	2	[9]
(Australia) A Myers (Australia) B Woolcock	7	6
(United States) J Elie (United States) S Vickery	5	1
4	(Australia) A Bai (Australia) J Fourlis	6^{7}	6	[4]
WC	(Australia) G Da Silva-Fick (Australia) I Popovic	7^{9}	2	[10]
(Japan) M Ayukawa (Japan) A Shimizu	6	7
(Australia) A Bozovic (Australia) A Marshall	2	5
(Australia) D Aiava (New Zealand) P Hourigan	6	6
(France) I Ramialison (Slovakia) Z Zlochová	1	3
(Chinese Taipei) Y-h Lee (Chinese Taipei) F-h Wu	3	3
3	(New Zealand) E Routliffe (Hungary) F Stollár	6	6
(Japan) H Arakawa (Japan) C Muramatsu	6	6
WC	(Australia) L Ashley (Australia) I Bozicevic	2	2
(Japan) K Okamura (Russia) K Rakhimova	3	2
2	(Australia) E Perez (Australia) S Sanders	6	6

Quarterfinals
1	(United States) D Krawczyk (United States) A Muhammad	2	6	[10]
(Australia) A Myers (Australia) B Woolcock	6	3	[5]
WC	(Australia) G Da Silva-Fick (Australia) I Popovic	4	4
(Japan) M Ayukawa (Japan) A Shimizu	6	6
(Australia) D Aiava (New Zealand) P Hourigan	3	6	[15]
3	(New Zealand) E Routliffe (Hungary) F Stollár	6	3	[13]
(Japan) H Arakawa (Japan) C Muramatsu	2	2
2	(Australia) E Perez (Australia) S Sanders	6	6

Semifinals
1	(United States) D Krawczyk (United States) A Muhammad	6	6
(Japan) M Ayukawa (Japan) A Shimizu	2	0
(Australia) D Aiava (New Zealand) P Hourigan	4	4
2	(Australia) E Perez (Australia) S Sanders	6	6

Final
1	(United States) D Krawczyk (United States) A Muhammad	3	2
2	(Australia) E Perez (Australia) S Sanders	6	6
