= 2023 Burnie International =

- Date: 30 January – 5 February
- Edition: 18th (men); 12th (women)
- Category: ATP Challenger Tour; ITF Women's World Tennis Tour
- Surface: Hard
- Location: Burnie, Australia

Champions

Men's singles
- (Australia) Rinky Hijikata

Women's singles
- (Australia) Storm Hunter

Men's doubles
- (Australia) Marc Polmans / (Australia) Max Purcell

Women's doubles
- (Japan) Mai Hontama / (Japan) Eri Hozumi
← 2020 ·	Burnie International	· 2024 →

The 2023 Burnie International was a professional tennis tournament played on outdoor hard courts. It was the 18th (men) and 12th (women) editions of the tournament which was part of the 2023 ATP Challenger Tour and the 2023 ITF Women's World Tennis Tour. It took place in Burnie, Australia between 30 January and 5 February 2023.

== Men's singles main-draw entrants ==
=== Seeds ===
Country	Player	Rank^{1}	Seed
AUS	James Duckworth	156	1
AUS	Rinky Hijikata	169	2
AUS	Max Purcell	205	3
JPN	Rio Noguchi	208	4
AUS	Omar Jasika	226	5
AUS	Dane Sweeny	246	6
JPN	Hiroki Moriya	275	7
JPN	Yasutaka Uchiyama	302	8

- ^{1} Rankings are as of 16 January 2023.

=== Other entrants ===
The following players received wildcards into the singles main draw:

- (Australia) Alex Bolt
- (Australia) Blake Ellis
- (Australia) Jeremy Jin

The following players received entry from the qualifying draw:

- (Australia) Charlie Camus
- (Australia) Jake Delaney
- (Australia) Matthew Romios
- (Japan) Daisuke Sumizawa
- (Japan) Yusuke Takahashi
- (Australia) Brandon Walkin

== Women's singles main draw entrants ==
=== Seeds ===
Country	Player	Rank^{1}	Seed
AUS	Jaimee Fourlis	160	1
AUS	Kimberly Birrell	167	2
AUS	Priscilla Hon	170	3
JPN	Mai Hontama	194	4
AUS	Olivia Gadecki	199	5
AUS	Storm Hunter	239	6
AUS	Lizette Cabrera	268	7
JPN	Himeno Sakatsume	284	8

- ^{1} Rankings as of 16 January 2023.

=== Other entrants ===
The following players received a wildcard into the singles main draw:

- (Australia) Elysia Bolton
- (Australia) Storm Hunter
- (Australia) Alexandra Osborne
- (Australia) Tina Nadine Smith

The following players received entry from the qualifying draw:

- (Australia) Roopa Bains
- (France) Yaroslava Bartashevich
- (Slovakia) Nikola Daubnerová
- (Japan) Eri Hozumi
- (Slovakia) Renáta Jamrichová
- (Australia) Milan Krish
- (Australia) Elena Micic
- (Germany) Ella Seidel

== Champions ==
=== Men's singles ===
- (Australia) Rinky Hijikata def. (Australia) James Duckworth 6–3, 6–3.

=== Women's singles ===
- (Australia) Storm Hunter def. (Australia) Olivia Gadecki 6–4, 6–3.

=== Men's doubles ===
- (Australia) Marc Polmans / (Australia) Max Purcell def. (Australia) Luke Saville / (Australia) Tristan Schoolkate 7–6^{(7–4)}, 6–4.

=== Women's doubles ===
- (Japan) Mai Hontama / (Japan) Eri Hozumi def. (Australia) Arina Rodionova / (Japan) Ena Shibahara 4–6, 6–3, [10–6].
