= 2023 Burnie International – Women's singles =

Women's singles
- 2023 Burnie International

Final
- Champion: (Australia) Storm Hunter
- Runner-up: (Australia) Olivia Gadecki
- Score: 6–4, 6–3

Events
| Singles | men | women |
| Doubles | men | women |
| ← 2020 · | Burnie International | · 2024 → |

Maddison Inglis was the defending champion but chose not to participate.

Storm Hunter won the title, defeating Olivia Gadecki in the final, 6–4, 6–3.

== Seeds ==
1. (Australia) Jaimee Fourlis (semifinals)
2. (Australia) Kimberly Birrell (second round)
3. (Australia) Priscilla Hon (quarterfinals)
4. (Japan) Mai Hontama (quarterfinals)
5. (Australia) Olivia Gadecki (final)
6. (Australia) Storm Hunter (champion)
7. (Australia) Lizette Cabrera (semifinals)
8. (Japan) Himeno Sakatsume (first round)

== Draw ==
=== Key ===
- Q = Qualifier
- WC = Wild card
- LL = Lucky loser
- Alt = Alternate
- SE = Special exempt
- PR = Protected ranking
- ITF = ITF entry
- JE = Junior exempt
- w/o = Walkover
- r = Retired
- d = Defaulted
- SR = Special ranking

=== Finals ===
Semifinals
1 | (Australia) Jaimee Fourlis | 4 | 6^{0}
5 | (Australia) Olivia Gadecki | 6 | 7^{7}
7 | (Australia) Lizette Cabrera | 3 | 4
6/WC | (Australia) Storm Hunter | 6 | 6

Final
5 | (Australia) Olivia Gadecki | 4 | 3
6/WC | (Australia) Storm Hunter | 6 | 6

=== Top half ===
First round
1 | (Australia) J Fourlis | 6 | 7
(Kazakhstan) A Danilina | 3 | 5
Q | (Japan) E Hozumi | 4 | 6 | 6
WC | (Australia) E Bolton | 6 | 4 | 4
(Australia) P Hule | 6^{3} | 6 | 7
(Japan) E Sema | 7^{7} | 4 | 5
WC | (Australia) TN Smith | 7^{8} | 3 | 6
8 | (Japan) H Sakatsume | 6^{6} | 6 | 4
3 | (Australia) P Hon | 6 | 6
Q | (France) Y Bartashevich | 3 | 0
(Japan) E Shibahara | 6 | 6
(Japan) H Kuwata | 2 | 2
WC | (Australia) A Osborne | 4 | 1
(Australia) Ar Rodionova | 6 | 6
(Japan) M Matsuda | 3 | 3
5 | (Australia) O Gadecki | 6 | 6

Second round
1 | (Australia) J Fourlis | 6 | 5 | 6
Q | (Japan) E Hozumi | 3 | 7 | 3
(Australia) P Hule | 7 | 6
WC | (Australia) TN Smith | 5 | 3
3 | (Australia) P Hon | 6 | 7
(Japan) E Shibahara | 1 | 5
(Australia) Ar Rodionova | 6 | 6^{5} | 4
5 | (Australia) O Gadecki | 3 | 7^{7} | 6

Quarterfinals
1 | (Australia) J Fourlis | 6 | 6
(Australia) P Hule | 4 | 0
3 | (Australia) P Hon | 2 | 2
5 | (Australia) O Gadecki | 6 | 6

Semifinals
1 | (Australia) J Fourlis | 4 | 6^{0}
5 | (Australia) O Gadecki | 6 | 7^{7}

=== Bottom half ===
First round
7 | (Australia) L Cabrera | 6 | 7^{7}
(Australia) D Aiava | 1 | 6^{3}
Q | (Australia) R Bains | 1 | 0
(United Kingdom) N Bains | 6 | 6
Q | (Germany) E Seidel | 6 | 7^{7}
(France) I Ramialison | 4 | 6^{5}
Q | (Slovakia) N Daubnerová | 1 | 4
4 | (Japan) M Hontama | 6 | 6
6/WC | (Australia) S Hunter | 6 | 6
Q | (Australia) E Micic | 0 | 0
(Australia) A Bozovic | 6 | 6
Q | (Slovakia) R Jamrichová | 2 | 2
(Australia) T Gibson | 4 | 7 | 1
(China) Y Ma | 6 | 5 | 6
Q | (Australia) M Krish | 1 | 0
2 | (Australia) K Birrell | 6 | 6

Second round
7 | (Australia) L Cabrera | 6 | 6
(United Kingdom) N Bains | 3 | 2
Q | (Germany) E Seidel | 1 | 3
4 | (Japan) M Hontama | 6 | 6
6/WC | (Australia) S Hunter | 7 | 6
(Australia) A Bozovic | 5 | 4
(China) Y Ma | 7^{7} | 7^{7}
2 | (Australia) K Birrell | 6^{4} | 6^{3}

Quarterfinals
7 | (Australia) L Cabrera | 6 | 6
4 | (Japan) M Hontama | 1 | 3
6/WC | (Australia) S Hunter | 6 | 6
(China) Y Ma | 3 | 4

Semifinals
7 | (Australia) L Cabrera | 3 | 4
6/WC | (Australia) S Hunter | 6 | 6
