= 2026 Queensland International =

- Date: 2 – 8 February
- Edition: 4th
- Surface: Hard
- Location: Brisbane, Australia

Champions

Men's singles
- (Australia) Dane Sweeny

Women's singles
- (Australia) Talia Gibson

Men's doubles
- (Australia) Blake Bayldon / (Australia) Marc Polmans

Women's doubles
- (Japan) Hayu Kinoshita / (China) Zhang Ying
- Brisbane Tennis International

The 2026 Brisbane Tennis International I was a professional tennis tournament played on hardcourts. It was the fourth edition of the tournament which was part of the 2026 ATP Challenger Tour and 2026 ITF Women's World Tennis Tour. It took place in Brisbane, Australia between 2 and 8 February 2026.

== Men's singles main-draw entrants ==
=== Seeds ===
Country	Player	Rank^{1}	Seed
AUS	Adam Walton	81	1
AUS	Tristan Schoolkate	98	2
AUS	Alex Bolt	171	3
AUS	James McCabe	173	4
AUS	Dane Sweeny	182	5
JPN	Rei Sakamoto	203	6
CHN	Sun Fajing	271	7
JPN	Yasutaka Uchiyama	302	8

- ^{1} Rankings are as of 19 January 2026.

=== Other entrants ===
The following players received wildcards into the singles main draw:

- (Australia) Cruz Hewitt
- (Australia) Tai Sach
- (Australia) Philip Sekulic

The following player received entry into the singles main draw as an alternate:

- (Australia) Matthew Dellavedova

The following players received entry from the qualifying draw:

- (Japan) Shinji Hazawa
- (Australia) Matt Hulme
- (Japan) Kokoro Isomura
- (Australia) Pavle Marinkov
- (Japan) Shunsuke Mitsui
- (Japan) Naoki Nakagawa

== Women's singles main-draw entrants ==
=== Seeds ===
Country	Player	Rank^{1}	Seed
AUS	Talia Gibson	119	1
AUS	Emerson Jones	153	2
AUS	Taylah Preston	161	3
CHN	Zhu Lin	164	4
JPN	Ena Shibahara	192	5
JPN	Nao Hibino	204	6
CHN	Ma Yexin	225	7
JPN	Sara Saito	262	8

- ^{1} Rankings are as of 19 January 2026.

=== Other entrants ===
The following players received wildcards into the singles main draw:

- (Australia) Petra Hule
- (Australia) Laquisa Khan
- (Australia) Sarah Mildren
- (Australia) Sarah Rokusek

The following players received entry from the qualifying draw:

- (New Zealand) Monique Barry
- (Japan) Nagi Hanatani
- (South Korea) Jang Su-jeong
- (Japan) Naho Sato
- (Hong Kong) Shek Cheuk-ying
- (Australia) Amy Stevens
- (China) Yuan Chengyiyi
- (China) Zhang Ruien

== Champions ==
=== Men's singles ===
- (Australia) Dane Sweeny def. (Australia) Tristan Schoolkate 3–6, 7–6^{(7–5)}, 7–6^{(7–4)}.

=== Women's singles ===
- (Australia) Talia Gibson def. (Japan) Nao Hibino 6–3, 7–6^{(9–7)}

=== Men's doubles ===
- (Australia) Blake Bayldon / (Australia) Marc Polmans def. (Australia) Jake Delaney / (Australia) Dane Sweeny 6–4, 6–4.

=== Women's doubles ===
- (Japan) Hayu Kinoshita / (China) Zhang Ying def. (Australia) Petra Hule / (Australia) Elena Micic 7–6^{(7–5)}, 7–5
