= 2024 Burnie International II – Women's doubles =

Women's doubles
- 2024 Burnie International II

Final
- Champions: (China) Tang Qianhui (China) You Xiaodi
- Runners-up: (China) Ma Yexin (Australia) Alana Parnaby
- Score: 6–4, 7–5

Events
Singles	men	women
Doubles	men	women
← 2023 ·	Burnie International	· 2025 →

Destanee Aiava and Naiktha Bains were the defending champions but Bains chose not to participate. Aiava partnered alongside Ella Simmons, but lost in the first round to Kyōka Okamura and Ayano Shimizu.

Tang Qianhui and You Xiaodi won the title, defeating Ma Yexin and Alana Parnaby in the final, 6–4, 7–5.

== Seeds ==
1. (Australia) Priscilla Hon / (Australia) Kaylah McPhee (first round)
2. (Japan) Kyōka Okamura / (Japan) Ayano Shimizu (quarterfinals)
3. (China) Tang Qianhui / (China) You Xiaodi (champions)
4. (Australia) Alexandra Osborne / (Indonesia) Jessy Rompies (first round)

== Draw ==
=== Key ===
- Q = Qualifier
- WC = Wild card
- LL = Lucky loser
- Alt = Alternate
- SE = Special exempt
- PR = Protected ranking
- ITF = ITF entry
- JE = Junior exempt
- w/o = Walkover
- r = Retired
- d = Defaulted
- SR = Special ranking

First round
1	(Australia) P Hon (Australia) K McPhee	5	4
(Japan) A Ito (Japan) S Saito	7	6
(China) Y Dang (Hong Kong) H-c Wu	2	6^{2}
(Australia) E Micic (Australia) TN Smith	6	7^{7}
3	(China) Q Tang (China) X You	6	6
(New Zealand) M Barry (Australia) E Jones	4	1
(Indonesia) B Gumulya (Japan) Y Naito	2	4
(South Korea) Y-w Ku (Japan) M Kuramochi	6	6
(China) Y Ma (Australia) A Parnaby	6	7^{8}
(Japan) Mi Mushika (Japan) Hik Sato	1	6^{6}
(Australia) M Ercan (Australia) P Hule	6^{4}	7^{7}	[10]
4	(Australia) A Osborne (Indonesia) J Rompies	7^{7}	6^{3}	[8]
(Australia) J Fourlis (United Kingdom) K Swan	6	6
(Australia) M Joint (Australia) T McGiffin	3	1
(Australia) D Aiava (Australia) E Simmons	5	1
2	(Japan) K Okamura (Japan) A Shimizu	7	6

Quarterfinals
(Japan) A Ito (Japan) S Saito	6	6
(Australia) E Micic (Australia) TN Smith	3	3
3	(China) Q Tang (China) X You	6	6
(South Korea) Y-w Ku (Japan) M Kuramochi	3	3
(China) Y Ma (Australia) A Parnaby	3	7^{7}	[10]
(Australia) M Ercan (Australia) P Hule	6	6^{4}	[4]
(Australia) J Fourlis (United Kingdom) K Swan	6	6
2	(Japan) K Okamura (Japan) A Shimizu	4	3

Semifinals
(Japan) A Ito (Japan) S Saito	2	4
3	(China) Q Tang (China) X You	6	6
(China) Y Ma (Australia) A Parnaby	4
(Australia) J Fourlis (United Kingdom) K Swan	1^{r}

Final
3	(China) Q Tang (China) X You	6	7
(China) Y Ma (Australia) A Parnaby	4	5
