= 2023 Tunis Open – Doubles =

Doubles
- 2023 Tunis Open

Final
- Champions: (France) Théo Arribagé (France) Luca Sanchez
- Runners-up: (Australia) James McCabe (Tunisia) Aziz Ouakaa
- Score: 4–6, 6–3, [10–5]

Events
Singles	Doubles
← 2022 ·	Tunis Open	· 2024 →

Nicolás Barrientos and Miguel Ángel Reyes-Varela were the defending champions but chose not to defend their title.

Théo Arribagé and Luca Sanchez won the title after defeating James McCabe and Aziz Ouakaa 4–6, 6–3, [10–5] in the final.

== Seeds ==
1. (Poland) Karol Drzewiecki / (Austria) Neil Oberleitner (first round)
2. (United States) Alex Lawson / (Greece) Michail Pervolarakis (first round)
3. (France) Théo Arribagé / (France) Luca Sanchez (champions)
4. (Norway) Viktor Durasovic / (New Zealand) Artem Sitak (quarterfinals)

== Draw ==
=== Key ===
- Q = Qualifier
- WC = Wild card
- LL = Lucky loser
- Alt = Alternate
- SE = Special exempt
- PR = Protected ranking
- ITF = ITF entry
- JE = Junior exempt
- w/o = Walkover
- r = Retired
- d = Defaulted
- SR = Special ranking

First round
1	(Poland) K Drzewiecki (Austria) N Oberleitner	5	6^{6}
(Japan) S Mochizuki (Japan) R Noguchi	7	7^{8}
(India) N Kaliyanda Poonacha (Australia) A Taylor	6	6
WC	(Tunisia) Rayen Hermassi (Tunisia) Youssef Labbene	3	2
4	(Norway) V Durasovic (New Zealand) A Sitak	7^{11}	6
(Australia) A Bolt (Japan) S Shimabukuro	6^{9}	3
(Tunisia) A Dougaz (Tunisia) M Jaziri	2	2
WC	(Australia) J McCabe (Tunisia) A Ouakaa	6	6
(France) G Blancaneaux (Argentina) R Olivo	5	4
3	(France) T Arribagé (France) L Sanchez	7	6
(France) A Hoang (France) G Jacq	6	1	[10]
(Australia) C Puttergill (Canada) K Stevenson	4	6	[3]
Alt	(Lebanon) H Habib (Netherlands) M Houkes	7^{7}	3	[10]
2	(United States) A Lawson (Greece) M Pervolarakis	6^{4}	6	[5]

Quarterfinals
(Japan) S Mochizuki (Japan) R Noguchi	5	6	[4]
(India) N Kaliyanda Poonacha (Australia) A Taylor	7	4	[10]
4	(Norway) V Durasovic (New Zealand) A Sitak	2	2
WC	(Australia) J McCabe (Tunisia) A Ouakaa	6	6
(United Kingdom) C Broom (Germany) T Sandkaulen	5	5
3	(France) T Arribagé (France) L Sanchez	7	7
(France) A Hoang (France) G Jacq	6	3	[6]
Alt	(Lebanon) H Habib (Netherlands) M Houkes	0	6	[10]

Semifinals
(India) N Kaliyanda Poonacha (Australia) A Taylor	6^{4}	6	[6]
WC	(Australia) J McCabe (Tunisia) A Ouakaa	7^{7}	4	[10]
3	(France) T Arribagé (France) L Sanchez	7^{13}	6
Alt	(Lebanon) H Habib (Netherlands) M Houkes	6^{11}	2

Final
WC	(Australia) J McCabe (Tunisia) A Ouakaa	6	3	[5]
3	(France) T Arribagé (France) L Sanchez	4	6	[10]
