= 2020 Burnie International – Women's singles =

Women's singles
- 2020 Burnie International

Final
- Champion: (Australia) Maddison Inglis
- Runner-up: (United States) Sachia Vickery
- Score: 2–6, 6–3, 7–5

Events
| Singles | men | women |
| Doubles | men | women |
- Burnie International

Belinda Woolcock was the defending champion but lost in the first round to Paula Badosa, in a repeat of the previous year's final.

Maddison Inglis won the title, defeating Sachia Vickery in the final, 2–6, 6–3, 7–5.

== Seeds ==
1. (Spain) Sara Sorribes Tormo (first round)
2. (Spain) Paula Badosa (semifinals)
3. (Australia) Lizette Cabrera (quarterfinals)
4. (Australia) Maddison Inglis (champion)
5. (United States) Sachia Vickery (final)
6. (Russia) Kamilla Rakhimova (quarterfinals)
7. (United Kingdom) Naiktha Bains (second round)
8. (United States) Asia Muhammad (first round)

== Draw ==
Key

- Q = Qualifier
- WC = Wild card
- LL = Lucky loser
- Alt = Alternate
- ITF = ITF entry
- PR = Protected ranking
- SR = Special ranking
- SE = Special exempt
- JE = Junior exempt
- JR = Junior Accelerator Programme entrant
- CO = College Accelerator Programme entrant
- NG = Next Gen Accelerator Program entrant
- w/o = Walkover
- r = Retired
- d = Defaulted

=== Finals ===
Semifinals
WC | (Australia) Ivana Popovic | 4 | 2
5 | (United States) Sachia Vickery | 6 | 6
4 | (Australia) Maddison Inglis | 7 | 7
2 | (Spain) Paula Badosa | 5 | 5

Final
5 | (United States) Sachia Vickery | 6 | 3 | 5
4 | (Australia) Maddison Inglis | 2 | 6 | 7

=== Top half ===
First round
1 | (Spain) S Sorribes Tormo | 2 | 6 | 2
WC | (Australia) I Popovic | 6 | 2 | 6
Q | (New Zealand) P Hourigan | 1 | 1
Q | (Japan) M Hontama | 6 | 6
(Japan) C Muramatsu | 6 | 6
Q | (Australia) G Da Silva-Fick | 4 | 4
(Japan) K Okamura | 7^{11} | 6
8 | (United States) A Muhammad | 6^{9} | 1
3 | (Australia) L Cabrera | 6 | 6
WC | (Australia) I Bozicevic | 1 | 2
(Hungary) F Stollár | 7^{8} | 6
(Chinese Taipei) Y-h Lee | 6^{6} | 2
(Slovakia) Z Zlochová | 1 | 6 | 6
(Poland) U Radwańska | 6 | 3 | 2
(Japan) A Shimizu | 2 | 3
5 | (United States) S Vickery | 6 | 6

Second round
WC | (Australia) I Popovic | 6 | 3 | 7
Q | (Japan) M Hontama | 2 | 6 | 5
(Japan) C Muramatsu | 6 | 6
(Japan) K Okamura | 3 | 4
3 | (Australia) L Cabrera | 7^{7} | 5 | 6
(Hungary) F Stollár | 6^{5} | 7 | 2
(Slovakia) Z Zlochová | 2 | 2
5 | (United States) S Vickery | 6 | 6

Quarterfinals
WC | (Australia) I Popovic | 7^{7} | 4 | 6
(Japan) C Muramatsu | 6^{5} | 6 | 4
3 | (Australia) L Cabrera | 5 | 1
5 | (United States) S Vickery | 7 | 6

Semifinals
WC | (Australia) I Popovic | 4 | 2
5 | (United States) S Vickery | 6 | 6

=== Bottom half ===
First round
7 | (United Kingdom) N Bains | 6 | 4 | 6
(Australia) D Aiava | 4 | 6 | 4
(Australia) A Myers | 6 | 6
WC | (Australia) E Perez | 3 | 4
Q | (France) I Ramialison | 4 | 4
LL | (New Zealand) E Routliffe | 6 | 6
Q | (Japan) M Ayukawa | 2 | 2
4 | (Australia) M Inglis | 6 | 6
6 | (Russia) K Rakhimova | 6 | 6
Q | (Japan) N Hanatani | 0 | 0
(Australia) J Fourlis | 7^{7} | 6
WC | (Australia) A Bozovic | 6^{4} | 3
Q | (Japan) H Sato | 3 | 2
Q | (Australia) A Marshall | 6 | 6
(Australia) B Woolcock | 3 | 2
2 | (Spain) P Badosa | 6 | 6

Second round
7 | (United Kingdom) N Bains | 3 | 3
(Australia) A Myers | 6 | 6
LL | (New Zealand) E Routliffe | 2 | 1
4 | (Australia) M Inglis | 6 | 6
6 | (Russia) K Rakhimova | 6 | 3 | 7
(Australia) J Fourlis | 2 | 6 | 5
Q | (Australia) A Marshall | 0 | 2
2 | (Spain) P Badosa | 6 | 6

Quarterfinals
(Australia) A Myers | 4 | 4
4 | (Australia) M Inglis | 6 | 6
6 | (Russia) K Rakhimova | 6^{6} | 2
2 | (Spain) P Badosa | 7^{8} | 6

Semifinals
4 | (Australia) M Inglis | 7 | 7
2 | (Spain) P Badosa | 5 | 5
