= 2024 Burnie International – Women's doubles =

Women's doubles
- 2024 Burnie International

Final
- Champions: (New Zealand) Paige Hourigan (New Zealand) Erin Routliffe
- Runners-up: (Japan) Kyōka Okamura (Japan) Ayano Shimizu
- Score: 7–6^{(7–5)}, 6–4

Events
Singles	men	women
Doubles	men	women
← 2023 ·	Burnie International	· 2025 →

Mai Hontama and Eri Hozumi were the defending champions but chose not to participate.

Paige Hourigan and Erin Routliffe won the title, defeating Kyōka Okamura and Ayano Shimizu in the final, 7–6^{(7–5)}, 6–4.

== Seeds ==
1. (Australia) Priscilla Hon / (Australia) Kaylah McPhee (first round)
2. (Japan) Aoi Ito / (Japan) Erika Sema (semifinals)
3. (Japan) Kyōka Okamura / (Japan) Ayano Shimizu (final)
4. (China) Tang Qianhui / (China) You Xiaodi (first round)

== Draw ==
=== Key ===
- Q = Qualifier
- WC = Wild card
- LL = Lucky loser
- Alt = Alternate
- SE = Special exempt
- PR = Protected ranking
- ITF = ITF entry
- JE = Junior exempt
- w/o = Walkover
- r = Retired
- d = Defaulted
- SR = Special ranking

First round
1	(Australia) P Hon (Australia) K McPhee	6	0	[3]
(Australia) A Osborne (Indonesia) J Rompies	1	6	[10]
(Indonesia) B Gumulya (Thailand) M Sawangkaew	4	1
(Australia) J Fourlis (United Kingdom) K Swan	6	6
3	(Japan) K Okamura (Japan) A Shimizu	7^{7}	2	[10]
(South Korea) Y-w Ku (Japan) Y Naito	6^{4}	6	[4]
(New Zealand) M Barry (Hong Kong) H-c Wu	6	1	[8]
(China) Y Ma (Australia) A Parnaby	1	6	[10]
(Australia) E Micic (Australia) TN Smith	2	7	[14]
(Australia) G Da Silva-Fick (Australia) P Hule	6	5	[12]
(New Zealand) P Hourigan (New Zealand) E Routliffe	7	7^{7}
4	(China) Q Tang (China) X You	5	6^{4}
(Australia) D Aiava (Australia) E Simmons	1	6	[6]
(Australia) M Joint (Australia) T McGiffin	6	3	[10]
(Japan) Mi Mushika (Japan) Hik Sato	5	6	[1]
2	(Japan) A Ito (Japan) E Sema	7	4	[10]

Quarterfinals
(Australia) A Osborne (Indonesia) J Rompies	4	3
(Australia) J Fourlis (United Kingdom) K Swan	6	6
3	(Japan) K Okamura (Japan) A Shimizu	6	6
(China) Y Ma (Australia) A Parnaby	1	1
(Australia) E Micic (Australia) TN Smith	4	2
(New Zealand) P Hourigan (New Zealand) E Routliffe	6	6
(Australia) M Joint (Australia) T McGiffin	3	1
2	(Japan) A Ito (Japan) E Sema	6	6

Semifinals
(Australia) J Fourlis (United Kingdom) K Swan	6	3	[11]
3	(Japan) K Okamura (Japan) A Shimizu	1	6	[13]
(New Zealand) P Hourigan (New Zealand) E Routliffe	6	7
2	(Japan) A Ito (Japan) E Sema	4	5

Final
(Japan) K Okamura (Japan) A Shimizu	6^{5}	4
(New Zealand) P Hourigan (New Zealand) E Routliffe	7^{7}	6
