= 2023 Tunis Open =

- Date: 15–20 May
- Edition: 13th
- Surface: Clay
- Location: Tunis, Tunisia

Champions

Singles
- (Japan) Sho Shimabukuro

Doubles
- (France) Théo Arribagé / (France) Luca Sanchez
← 2022 ·	Tunis Open	· 2024 →

The 2023 Tunis Open, known as the Kia Tunis Open, was a professional tennis tournament played on clay courts. It was the 13th edition of the tournament which was part of the 2023 ATP Challenger Tour. It took place in Tunis, Tunisia between 15 and 20 May 2023.

== Singles main-draw entrants ==
=== Seeds ===
Country	Player	Rank^{1}	Seed
CRO	Borna Gojo	102	1
GBR	Liam Broady	138	2
CHI	Tomás Barrios Vera	143	3
GER	Maximilian Marterer	148	4
ARG	Thiago Agustín Tirante	150	5
POR	João Sousa	156	6
ITA	Mattia Bellucci	165	7
BIH	Damir Džumhur	172	8

- ^{1} Rankings are as of 8 May 2023.

=== Other entrants ===
The following players received wildcards into the singles main draw:

- (Tunisia) Aziz Dougaz
- (Tunisia) Malek Jaziri
- (Tunisia) Aziz Ouakaa

The following player received entry into the singles main as a special exempt:

- (Czech Republic) Jakub Menšík

The following player received entry into the singles main draw as an alternate:

- (Uruguay) Pablo Cuevas

The following players received entry from the qualifying draw:

- (Netherlands) Jesper de Jong
- (Japan) Shintaro Mochizuki
- (Spain) Daniel Rincón
- (Japan) Sho Shimabukuro
- (Italy) Alexander Weis
- (Switzerland) Damien Wenger

The following player received entry as a lucky loser:

- (Colombia) Nicolás Mejía

== Champions ==
=== Singles ===
- (Japan) Sho Shimabukuro def. (France) Geoffrey Blancaneaux 6–4, 6–4.

=== Doubles ===
- (France) Théo Arribagé / (France) Luca Sanchez def. (Australia) James McCabe / (Tunisia) Aziz Ouakaa 4–6, 6–3, [10–5].
