= 2023 Burnie International – Men's doubles =

Men's doubles
- 2023 Burnie International

Final
- Champions: (Australia) Marc Polmans (Australia) Max Purcell
- Runners-up: (Australia) Luke Saville (Australia) Tristan Schoolkate
- Score: 7–6^{(7–4)}, 6–4

Events
| Singles | men | women |
| Doubles | men | women |
- Burnie International

Harri Heliövaara and Sem Verbeek were the defending champions but chose not to defend their title.

Marc Polmans and Max Purcell won the title after defeating Luke Saville and Tristan Schoolkate 7–6^{(7–4)}, 6–4 in the final.

== Seeds ==
1. (Australia) Luke Saville / (Australia) Tristan Schoolkate (final)
2. (Australia) Marc Polmans / (Australia) Max Purcell (champions)
3. (Australia) Calum Puttergill / (Australia) Dane Sweeny (quarterfinals)
4. (Japan) Shinji Hazawa / (Japan) Yuta Shimizu (semifinals)

== Draw ==
Key

- Q = Qualifier
- WC = Wild card
- LL = Lucky loser
- Alt = Alternate
- ITF = ITF entry
- PR = Protected ranking
- SR = Special ranking
- SE = Special exempt
- JE = Junior exempt
- JR = Junior Accelerator Programme entrant
- CO = College Accelerator Programme entrant
- NG = Next Gen Accelerator Program entrant
- w/o = Walkover
- r = Retired
- d = Defaulted

First round
1 | (Australia) L Saville (Australia) T Schoolkate | 7^{7} | 6
(Australia) B Bayldon (France) M Chazal | 6^{3} | 3
(Japan) Yuki Mochizuki (Japan) Makoto Ochi | 2 | 6 | [7]
(Japan) H Moriya (Japan) R Noguchi | 6 | 4 | [10]
3 | (Australia) C Puttergill (Australia) D Sweeny | 6 | 6
(Australia) Mitchell Harper (Australia) Zaharije-Zak Talic | 3 | 3
(Australia) D Kelly (Australia) MC Romios | 7^{7} | 6
(Australia) T Fancut (Australia) B Walkin | 6^{4} | 4
(Japan) Daisuke Sumizawa (Japan) Y Takahashi | 3 | 1
(Japan) Shuichi Sekiguchi (Japan) Y Uchiyama | 6 | 6
(Australia) A Taylor (Australia) J Taylor | 4 | 4
4 | (Japan) S Hazawa (Japan) Y Shimizu | 6 | 6
(Australia) J McCabe (Australia) E Winter | 7^{7} | 6
PR | (Australia) Ja Delaney (Australia) Jeremy Jin | 6^{5} | 2
(Australia) B Ellis (Australia) A Walton | 1 | 3
2 | (Australia) M Polmans (Australia) M Purcell | 6 | 6

Quarterfinals
1 | (Australia) L Saville (Australia) T Schoolkate | 6 | 6
(Japan) H Moriya (Japan) R Noguchi | 0 | 3
3 | (Australia) C Puttergill (Australia) D Sweeny | 6 | 3 | [7]
(Australia) D Kelly (Australia) MC Romios | 3 | 6 | [10]
(Japan) S Sekiguchi (Japan) Y Uchiyama | 3 | 6 | [6]
4 | (Japan) S Hazawa (Japan) Y Shimizu | 6 | 3 | [10]
(Australia) J McCabe (Australia) E Winter | 2 | 1
2 | (Australia) M Polmans (Australia) M Purcell | 6 | 6

Semifinals
1 | (Australia) L Saville (Australia) T Schoolkate | 7 | 6
(Australia) D Kelly (Australia) MC Romios | 5 | 3
4 | (Japan) S Hazawa (Japan) Y Shimizu | 6^{8} | 6^{3}
2 | (Australia) M Polmans (Australia) M Purcell | 7^{10} | 7^{7}

Final
1 | (Australia) L Saville (Australia) T Schoolkate | 6^{4} | 4
2 | (Australia) M Polmans (Australia) M Purcell | 7^{7} | 6
