= 2023 Tunis Open – Singles =

Singles
- 2023 Tunis Open

Final
- Champion: (Japan) Sho Shimabukuro
- Runner-up: (France) Geoffrey Blancaneaux
- Score: 6–4, 6–4

Events
Singles	Doubles
← 2022 ·	Tunis Open	· 2024 →

Roberto Carballés Baena was the defending champion but chose not to defend his title.

Sho Shimabukuro won the title after defeating Geoffrey Blancaneaux 6–4, 6–4 in the final.

== Seeds ==
1. (Croatia) Borna Gojo (semifinals)
2. (United Kingdom) Liam Broady (first round)
3. (Chile) Tomás Barrios Vera (second round)
4. (Germany) Maximilian Marterer (quarterfinals, retired)
5. (Argentina) Thiago Agustín Tirante (second round)
6. (Portugal) João Sousa (first round)
7. (Italy) Mattia Bellucci (first round)
8. (Bosnia and Herzegovina) Damir Džumhur (quarterfinals)

== Draw ==
=== Key ===
- Q = Qualifier
- WC = Wild card
- LL = Lucky loser
- Alt = Alternate
- SE = Special exempt
- PR = Protected ranking
- ITF = ITF entry
- JE = Junior exempt
- w/o = Walkover
- r = Retired
- d = Defaulted
- SR = Special ranking

=== Finals ===
Semifinals
1	(Croatia) Borna Gojo	2	3
(France) Geoffrey Blancaneaux	6	6
Q	(Japan) Sho Shimabukuro	6	6
Q	(Netherlands) Jesper de Jong	3	1

Final
(France) Geoffrey Blancaneaux	4	4
Q	(Japan) Sho Shimabukuro	6	6

=== Top half ===
First round
1	(Croatia) B Gojo	6	7^{7}
LL	(Colombia) N Mejía	4	6^{4}
Q	(Switzerland) D Wenger	2	2
(Japan) R Noguchi	6	6
SE	(Czech Republic) J Menšík	6	6
(France) L Lokoli	4	2
(Romania) ND Ionel	7^{7}	6
7	(Italy) M Bellucci	6^{5}	2
4	(Germany) M Marterer	6	6
(Chile) A Tabilo	3	2
(Belgium) J De Loore	6	5	3
Q	(Spain) D Rincón	4	7	6
(Belgium) K Coppejans	6	6
(Italy) F Maestrelli	3	4
(France) G Blancaneaux	6	5	6
6	(Portugal) J Sousa	3	7	4

Second round
1	(Croatia) B Gojo	6	6
(Japan) R Noguchi	2	1
SE	(Czech Republic) J Menšík	6^{5}	6	7
(Romania) ND Ionel	7^{7}	4	5
4	(Germany) M Marterer	6	6
Q	(Spain) D Rincón	3	4
(Belgium) K Coppejans	2	6	3
(France) G Blancaneaux	6	2	6

Quarterfinals
1	(Croatia) B Gojo	6	6
SE	(Czech Republic) J Menšík	2	0
4	(Germany) M Marterer	2^{r}
(France) G Blancaneaux	5

Semifinals
1	(Croatia) B Gojo	2	3
(France) G Blancaneaux	6	6

=== Bottom half ===
First round
5	(Argentina) TA Tirante	6	6
Q	(Japan) S Mochizuki	4	4
WC	(Tunisia) M Jaziri	3	1
WC	(Tunisia) A Dougaz	6	6
(Argentina) GA Olivieri	7^{7}	3	4
Q	(Japan) S Shimabukuro	6^{2}	6	6
(Italy) M Gigante	1	0^{r}
3	(Chile) T Barrios Vera	6	1
8	(Bosnia and Herzegovina) D Džumhur	1	6	6
WC	(Tunisia) A Ouakaa	6	0	2
(Austria) D Novak	2	6	7^{7}
(Belgium) G-A Bailly	6	3	6^{3}
Q	(Netherlands) J de Jong	7^{7}	2
Alt	(Uruguay) P Cuevas	6^{0}	1^{r}
Q	(Italy) Alexander Weis	6	5	6
2	(United Kingdom) L Broady	0	7	3

Second round
5	(Argentina) TA Tirante	4	3
WC	(Tunisia) A Dougaz	6	6
Q	(Japan) S Shimabukuro	3	6	6
3	(Chile) T Barrios Vera	6	3	2
8	(Bosnia and Herzegovina) D Džumhur	6	6
(Austria) D Novak	4	0
Q	(Netherlands) J de Jong	6	6
Q	(Italy) A Weis	4	3

Quarterfinals
WC	(Tunisia) A Dougaz	6	5	3
Q	(Japan) S Shimabukuro	2	7	6
8	(Bosnia and Herzegovina) D Džumhur	5	6	3
Q	(Netherlands) J de Jong	7	4	6

Semifinals
Q	(Japan) S Shimabukuro	6	6
Q	(Netherlands) J de Jong	3	1
