= 2023 Burnie International – Women's doubles =

Women's doubles
- 2023 Burnie International

Final
- Champions: (Japan) Mai Hontama (Japan) Eri Hozumi
- Runners-up: (Australia) Arina Rodionova (Japan) Ena Shibahara
- Score: 4–6, 6–3, [10–6]

Events
Singles	men	women
Doubles	men	women
← 2020 ·	Burnie International	· 2024 →

Storm Hunter and Ellen Perez were the defending champions but chose not to participate.

Mai Hontama and Eri Hozumi won the title, defeating Arina Rodionova and Ena Shibahara in the final, 4–6, 6–3, [10–6].

== Seeds ==
1. (Australia) Arina Rodionova / (Japan) Ena Shibahara (final)
2. (Japan) Mai Hontama / (Japan) Eri Hozumi (champions)
3. (Australia) Alexandra Bozovic / (Australia) Lizette Cabrera (semifinals)
4. (Japan) Hiroko Kuwata / (China) Ma Yexin (first round)

== Draw ==
=== Key ===
- Q = Qualifier
- WC = Wild card
- LL = Lucky loser
- Alt = Alternate
- SE = Special exempt
- PR = Protected ranking
- ITF = ITF entry
- JE = Junior exempt
- w/o = Walkover
- r = Retired
- d = Defaulted
- SR = Special ranking

First round
1	(Australia) Ar Rodionova (Japan) E Shibahara	6	6
(Slovakia) N Daubnerová (Slovakia) R Jamrichová	3	4
(Australia) J Fourlis (Australia) P Hon	2	6^{3}
(Australia) D Aiava (United Kingdom) N Bains	6	7^{7}
3	(Australia) A Bozovic (Australia) L Cabrera	2	6	[10]
(Australia) L Fairclough (Australia) O Gadecki	6	3	[3]
(Japan) H Sakatsume (Japan) R Sawayanagi	4	7^{7}	[10]
WC	(Australia) T Bajagic (Australia) E Micic	6	6^{5}	[3]
(Australia) R Bains (Australia) A Smith	2	0
(Australia) T Gibson (Australia) P Hule	6	6
(Japan) M Matsuda (Japan) E Shimizu	6	6
4	(Japan) H Kuwata (China) Y Ma	3	4
(Japan) E Hayashi (Japan) E Sema	6	6
(France) Y Bartashevich (Germany) E Seidel	4	4
(New Zealand) P Hourigan (Australia) A Osborne	6^{2}	6	[7]
2	(Japan) M Hontama (Japan) E Hozumi	7^{7}	3	[10]

Quarterfinals
1	(Australia) Ar Rodionova (Japan) E Shibahara	6	6
(Australia) D Aiava (United Kingdom) N Bains	2	3
3	(Australia) A Bozovic (Australia) L Cabrera	6	6
(Japan) H Sakatsume (Japan) R Sawayanagi	3	3
(Australia) T Gibson (Australia) P Hule	6	6
(Japan) M Matsuda (Japan) E Shimizu	2	1
(Japan) E Hayashi (Japan) E Sema	0	4
2	(Japan) M Hontama (Japan) E Hozumi	6	6

Semifinals
1	(Australia) Ar Rodionova (Japan) E Shibahara	7	7
3	(Australia) A Bozovic (Australia) L Cabrera	5	5
(Australia) T Gibson (Australia) P Hule	4	4
2	(Japan) M Hontama (Japan) E Hozumi	6	6

Final
1	(Australia) Ar Rodionova (Japan) E Shibahara	6	3	[6]
2	(Japan) M Hontama (Japan) E Hozumi	4	6	[10]
