= 2024 Burnie International II – Women's singles =

Women's singles
- 2024 Burnie International II

Final
- Champion: (Australia) Maya Joint
- Runner-up: (Japan) Aoi Ito
- Score: 1–6, 6–1, 7–5

Events
Singles	men	women
Doubles	men	women
← 2023 ·	Burnie International	· 2025 →

Jaimee Fourlis was the defending champion but lost in the second round to Petra Hule.

Maya Joint won the title, defeating Aoi Ito in the final, 1–6, 6–1, 7–5.

== Seeds ==
1. (Czech Republic) Gabriela Knutson (first round)
2. (Australia) Priscilla Hon (second round)
3. (Australia) Destanee Aiava (second round)
4. (China) Ma Yexin (second round)
5. (China) Wei Sijia (semifinals)
6. (Australia) Jaimee Fourlis (second round)
7. (China) You Xiaodi (first round)
8. (Thailand) Mananchaya Sawangkaew (second round)

== Draw ==
Key

- Q = Qualifier
- WC = Wild card
- LL = Lucky loser
- Alt = Alternate
- ITF = ITF entry
- PR = Protected ranking
- SR = Special ranking
- SE = Special exempt
- JE = Junior exempt
- JR = Junior Accelerator Programme entrant
- CO = College Accelerator Programme entrant
- NG = Next Gen Accelerator Program entrant
- w/o = Walkover
- r = Retired
- d = Defaulted

=== Finals ===
Semifinals
(Japan) Sara Saito	6	2	3
(Japan) Aoi Ito	3	6	6
WC	(Australia) Maya Joint	6	6
5	(China) Wei Sijia	3	4

Final
(Japan) Aoi Ito	6	1	5
WC	(Australia) Maya Joint	1	6	7

=== Top half ===
First round
1	(Czech Republic) G Knutson	5	6	1
(Japan) S Saito	7	3	6
Q	(Japan) E Shibahara	6	6
(Japan) S Hosogi	1	3
(United Kingdom) A Banks	6^{5}	5
(Australia) P Hule	7^{7}	7
(Japan) A Shimizu	3	7	0
6	(Australia) J Fourlis	6	5	6
3	(Australia) D Aiava	6	7
WC	(Australia) E Micic	3	5
(Japan) A Ito	7^{7}	6
Q	(Australia) I Popovic	6^{3}	4
Q	(Australia) M Ercan	6	6
Q	(Japan) Mi Mushika	4	4
(United Kingdom) K Swan	6	6
7	(China) X You	2	4

Second round
(Japan) S Saito	7^{7}	6
Q	(Japan) E Shibahara	6^{3}	3
(Australia) P Hule	6	7
6	(Australia) J Fourlis	2	5
3	(Australia) D Aiava	2	2
(Japan) A Ito	6	6
Q	(Australia) M Ercan	3	2
(United Kingdom) K Swan	6	6

Quarterfinals
(Japan) S Saito	4	6	6
(Australia) P Hule	6	1	3
(Japan) A Ito	6	7
(United Kingdom) K Swan	3	5

Semifinals
(Japan) S Saito	6	2	3
(Japan) A Ito	3	6	6

=== Bottom half ===
First round
8	(Thailand) M Sawangkaew	6	6
(Japan) K Okamura	3	3
(Australia) L Cabrera	3	3
WC	(Australia) M Joint	6	6
Q	(Australia) A Parnaby	3	7	1
(Australia) K McPhee	6	5	6
Q	(Japan) Y Naito	6^{1}	2
4	(China) Y Ma	7^{7}	6
5	(China) S Wei	3	6	7^{8}
SR	(Romania) I Fetecău	6	4	6^{6}
WC	(Australia) E Jones	6	7^{8}
(Australia) TN Smith	3	6^{6}
(Japan) H Kaji	6	6
Q	(Japan) E Sema	1	3
Q	(Japan) M Kuramochi	1	5
2	(Australia) P Hon	6	7

Second round
8	(Thailand) M Sawangkaew	3	1
WC	(Australia) M Joint	6	6
(Australia) K McPhee	6	6
4	(China) Y Ma	1	1
5	(China) S Wei	6	6
WC	(Australia) E Jones	3	3
(Japan) H Kaji	3	6	6
2	(Australia) P Hon	6	3	3

Quarterfinals
WC	(Australia) M Joint	7	6
(Australia) K McPhee	5	0
5	(China) S Wei	6	6
(Japan) H Kaji	3	4

Semifinals
WC	(Australia) M Joint	6	6
5	(China) S Wei	3	4
