= 2024 Burnie International II – Men's doubles =

Men's doubles
- 2024 Burnie International II

Final
- Champions: (Zimbabwe) Benjamin Lock (Japan) Yuta Shimizu
- Runners-up: (Australia) Blake Bayldon (Australia) Kody Pearson
- Score: 6–4, 7–6^{(7–4)}

Events
Singles	men	women
Doubles	men	women
- Burnie International

Alex Bolt and Luke Saville were the defending champions but lost in the semifinals to Blake Bayldon and Kody Pearson.

Benjamin Lock and Yuta Shimizu won the title after defeating Bayldon and Pearson 6–4, 7–6^{(7–4)} in the final.

== Seeds ==
1. (Australia) Blake Ellis / (Australia) Calum Puttergill (semifinals)
2. (Australia) Alex Bolt / (Australia) Luke Saville (semifinals)
3. (Australia) Matthew Romios / (Australia) Brandon Walkin (quarterfinals)
4. (Zimbabwe) Benjamin Lock / (Japan) Yuta Shimizu (champions)

== Draw ==
Key

- Q = Qualifier
- WC = Wild card
- LL = Lucky loser
- Alt = Alternate
- ITF = ITF entry
- PR = Protected ranking
- SR = Special ranking
- SE = Special exempt
- JE = Junior exempt
- JR = Junior Accelerator Programme entrant
- CO = College Accelerator Programme entrant
- NG = Next Gen Accelerator Program entrant
- w/o = Walkover
- r = Retired
- d = Defaulted

First round
1	(Australia) B Ellis (Australia) C Puttergill	7	6
PR	(Japan) M Imamura (Japan) N Tajima	5	2
(Japan) T Ichikawa (Japan) S Watanabe	6	3	[8]
Alt	(Japan) Shintaro Imai (Japan) H Moriya	3	6	[10]
4	(Zimbabwe) B Lock (Japan) Y Shimizu	6	6
(France) M Chazal; Mikalai Haliak	3	1
(Greece) S Sakellaridis (Australia) A Taylor	6^{4}	6^{6}
(Australia) Jacob Bradshaw (Australia) Mitchell Harper	7^{7}	7^{8}
(Australia) B Bayldon (Australia) K Pearson	3	7^{9}	[10]
(Australia) Ja Delaney (Australia) Je Delaney	6	6^{7}	[5]
(Australia) Corey Gaal (Australia) Pavle Marinkov	6	3	[9]
3	(Australia) MC Romios (Australia) B Walkin	3	6	[11]
Alt	(Australia) Jayden Court (United States) Andre Ilagan	6	6^{5}	[10]
(Australia) P Harper (Australia) M Hulme	3	7^{7}	[5]
(Japan) Yuki Mochizuki (Japan) Makoto Ochi	3	1
2	(Australia) A Bolt (Australia) L Saville	6	6

Quarterfinals
1	(Australia) B Ellis (Australia) C Puttergill	6	6
Alt	(Japan) S Imai (Japan) H Moriya	1	1
4	(Zimbabwe) B Lock (Japan) Y Shimizu	6	6
(Australia) J Bradshaw (Australia) M Harper	4	2
(Australia) B Bayldon (Australia) K Pearson	6	7
3	(Australia) MC Romios (Australia) B Walkin	3	5
Alt	(Australia) J Court (United States) A Ilagan	3	5
2	(Australia) A Bolt (Australia) L Saville	6	7

Semifinals
1	(Australia) B Ellis (Australia) C Puttergill	6^{6}	2
4	(Zimbabwe) B Lock (Japan) Y Shimizu	7^{8}	6
(Australia) B Bayldon (Australia) K Pearson	6	6
2	(Australia) A Bolt (Australia) L Saville	1	4

Final
4	(Zimbabwe) B Lock (Japan) Y Shimizu	6	7^{7}
(Australia) B Bayldon (Australia) K Pearson	4	6^{4}
