= Ivana Popovic =

Australian tennis player

- Country (sports): Australia
- Residence: Sydney, Australia
- Born: 19 September 2000 (age 25) Sydney, Australia
- Plays: Right (two-handed backhand)
- Prize money: $124,627

Singles
- Career record: 91–86
- Career titles: 0
- Highest ranking: No. 354 (10 August 2020)

Grand Slam singles results
- Australian Open: Q2 (2024)

Doubles
- Career record: 32–39
- Career titles: 2 ITF
- Highest ranking: No. 250 (15 November 2021)

Grand Slam doubles results
- Australian Open: 1R (2021)

Grand Slam mixed doubles results
- Australian Open: 1R (2021)

Ivana Popovic (born 19 September 2000) is an Australian former tennis player.

Popovic has a highest singles ranking by the Women's Tennis Association (WTA) of 354, achieved on 10 August 2020. She also has a career-high WTA doubles ranking of 250, set on 15 November 2021.

Popovic made her WTA Tour main-draw debut at the 2021 Gippsland Trophy, where she received a wildcard into the doubles competition, partnering Abbie Myers.

Her brother Milislav Popovic is a professional footballer.

== ITF Circuit finals ==
=== Singles: 1 (runner-up) ===
Legend W25 tournaments (0–1)	Finals by surface Hard (0–1)

Result	Date	Tournament	Tier	Surface	Opponent	Score
Loss	Dec 2023	ITF Papamoa, New Zealand	W25	Hard	(Australia) Talia Gibson	3–6, 4–6

=== Doubles: 3 (2 titles, 1 runner-up) ===
Legend W60 tournaments W25 tournaments (2–1)	Finals by surface Hard (0–1) Clay (2–0)

Result	W–L	Date	Tournament	Tier	Surface	Partner	Opponents	Score
Win	1–0	Jul 2019	ITF Aschaffenburg, Germany	W25	Clay	(Italy) Tatiana Pieri	(Spain) Irene Burillo (Greece) Despina Papamichail	7–6^{(5)}, 6–4
Loss	1–1	Sep 2021	ITF Fort Worth, United States	W25	Hard	(United States) Rasheeda McAdoo	(United States) Sophie Chang (United States) Amy Zhu	6–4, 3–6, [8–10]
Win	2–1	Aug 2023	Vrnjačka Banja Open, Serbia	W25	Clay	(Serbia) Elena Milovanović	(Italy) Diletta Cherubini (Finland) Laura Hietaranta	6–4, 6–1
