= James McCabe (tennis) =

Filipino-born Australian tennis player (born 2003)

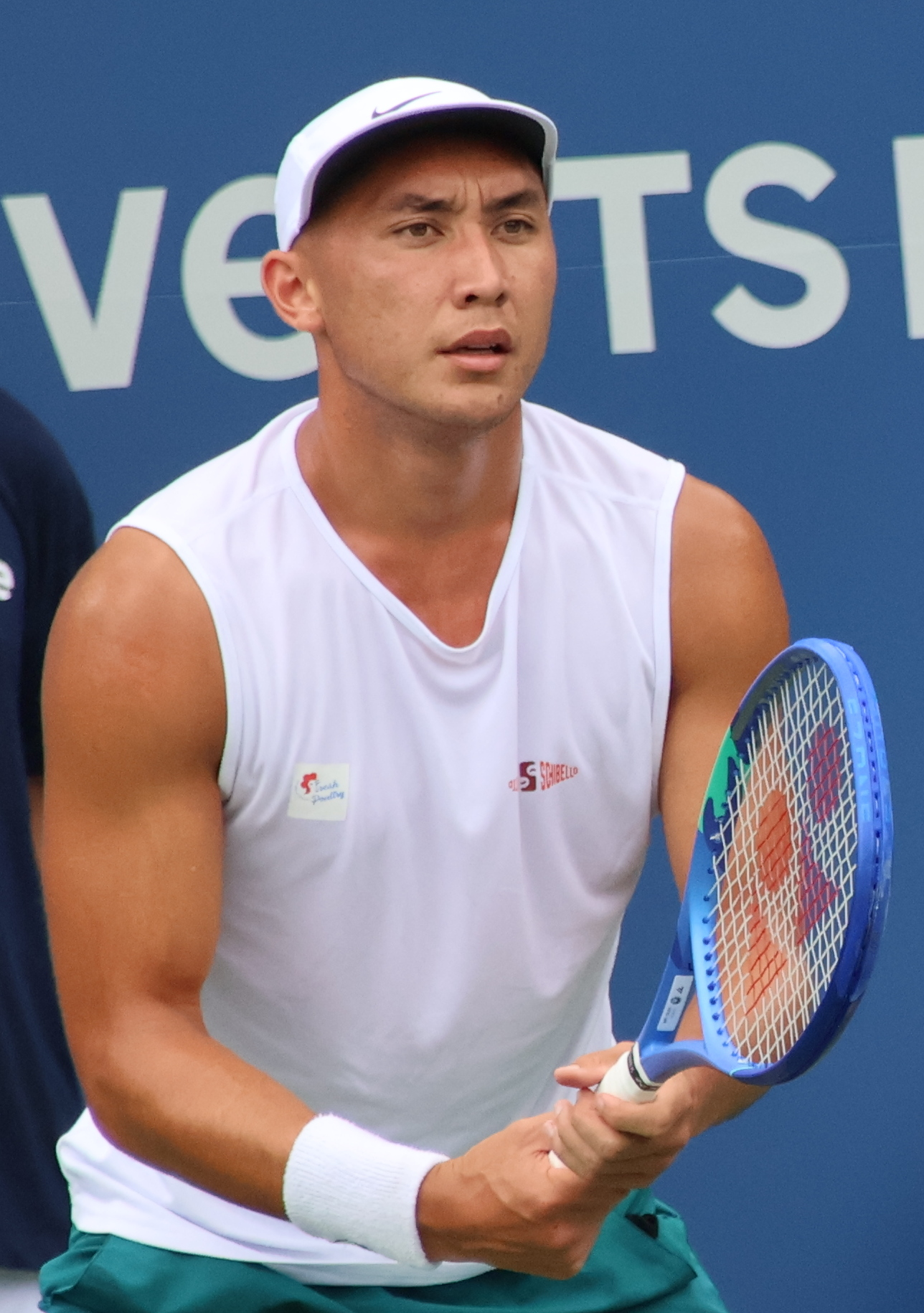
- McCabe at the 2025 Washington Open
- Country (sports): Australia
- Born: 5 July 2003 (age 23) Iba, Philippines
- Height: 1.88 m (6 ft 2 in)
- Plays: Right-handed (two-handed backhand)
- Coach: Patrick McCabe, Wally Masur
- Prize money: US $787,074

Singles
- Career record: 1–7
- Career titles: 0
- Highest ranking: No. 164 (14 July 2025)
- Current ranking: No. 233 (18 May 2026)

Grand Slam singles results
- Australian Open: 2R (2025)
- French Open: Q1 (2025, 2026)
- Wimbledon: 1R (2025)
- US Open: Q2 (2025)

Doubles
- Career record: 2–3
- Career titles: 0
- Highest ranking: No. 302 (31 July 2023)
- Current ranking: No. 356 (18 May 2026)

Grand Slam doubles results
- Australian Open: 3R (2026)
- Last updated on: 19 May 2026.

James Fernandez McCabe (born 5 July 2003) is an Australian professional tennis player. He has a career-high ATP singles ranking of No. 164 achieved on 14 July 2025 and a doubles ranking of No. 302 achieved on 31 July 2023.

== Early life ==
McCabe was born in Iba, Philippines to an Irish father and a Filipina mother. He holds dual Irish and Australian citizenship. At six months of age he moved to Sydney, Australia where he was raised. McCabe broke the national U10 beep test record in 2013, was crowned the Australian national junior 200m butterfly swimming champion, won the 2019 U16 Australian national championship in tennis as well as being an accomplished flautist with an AMusA (Associate in Music, Australia) diploma.

== Professional career ==
=== 2021 ===
McCabe began competing in professional events in late 2021 and was able to reach the quarterfinals of the first ITF Futures event he entered in Tunisia in October 2021 after winning all three matches in the qualifying draw. He continued playing Tunisian ITF Futures tournaments for the remainder of the 2021 season which included a second quarterfinal appearance in November and his results during this period boosted his singles ranking to finish the year at No.1209.

=== 2022–23 ===
In January 2022, he was rewarded for strong finish to the 2021 season with a main draw wildcard into his first ATP Challenger in Bendigo as well as a qualifying wildcard into the 2022 Australian Open. McCabe was also rewarded with a main draw wildcard entry into the doubles draw and partnered Alex Bolt. The pair were defeated in the first round by eventual champions Nick Kyrgios and Thanasi Kokkinakis.

McCabe won his first professional tournament in February 2022 when he defeated Dane Sweeny in the final of the ITF Futures tournament in Canberra and followed it up the a second Futures title the following month in Bendigo.

He spent the 2022 season playing on the ITF Futures and ATP Challenger circuits and was able to improve his singles ranking to No. 405 in 2022 and No. 272 in 2023.

=== 2024–26: ATP, Grand Slam debuts and first win, top 200 ===
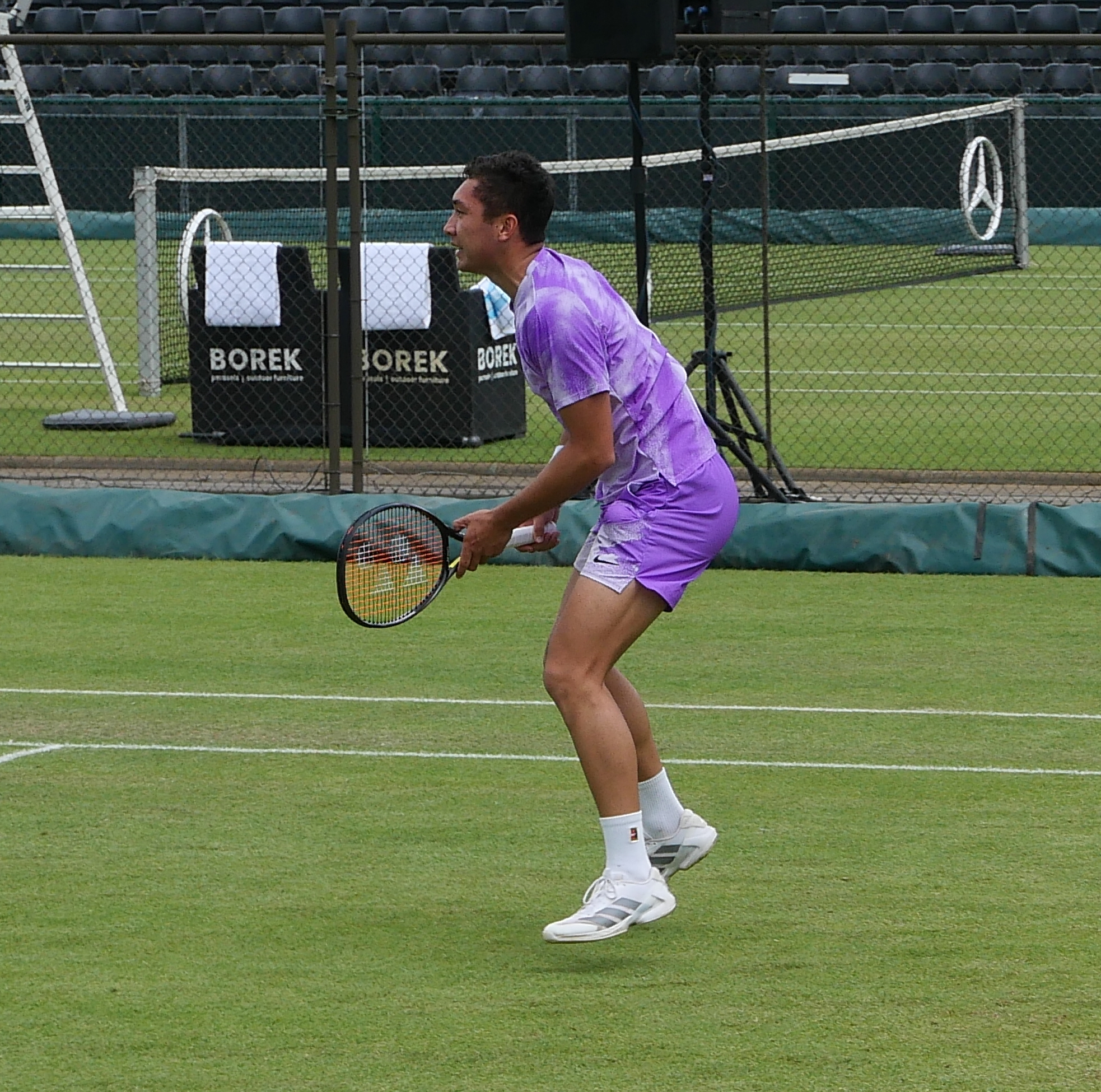

In January 2024, it was announced McCabe was awarded a wildcard for the 2024 Australian Open main draw singles event making his Grand Slam debut.

He entered the main draw of the 2024 Adelaide International as a lucky loser, making his ATP debut. He also entered the main draw of the 2024 Hangzhou Open as a lucky loser.

Ranked No. 258, McCabe was awarded a consecutive main draw wildcard at the 2025 Australian Open where he recorded his first Grand Slam win in straight sets over qualifier Martín Landaluce.

At his Wimbledon qualifying debut, he won three matches including a victory over world No. 107 Tomás Barrios Vera to achieve his first Wimbledon main draw entry.

== Performance timeline ==
Key
W	F	SF	QF	#R	RR	Q#	DNQ	A	NH

(W) winner; (F) finalist; (SF) semifinalist; (QF) quarterfinalist; (#R) rounds 4, 3, 2, 1; (RR) round-robin stage; (Q#) qualification round; (DNQ) did not qualify; (A) absent; (NH) not held; (SR) strike rate (events won / competed); (W–L) win–loss record.

=== Singles ===
Tournament!	2022	2023	2024	2025	2026	SR	W–L	Win %
Grand Slam tournaments
Australian Open	Q1	Q1	1R	2R	Q2	0 / 2	1–2	33%
French Open	A	A	A	Q1		0 / 0	0–0	–
Wimbledon	A	A	A	1R		0 / 1	0–1	0%
US Open	A	A	A	Q2		0 / 0	0–0	–
Win–loss	0–0	0–0	0–1	1–2	0–0	0 / 3	1–3	25%
ATP Masters 1000
Indian Wells Masters	A	A	A	A		0 / 0	0–0	–
Miami Open	A	A	A	A		0 / 0	0–0	–
Monte Carlo Masters	A	A	A	A		0 / 0	0–0	–
Madrid Open	A	A	A	A		0 / 0	0-0	–
Italian Open	A	A	A	A		0 / 0	0–0	–
Canadian Open	A	A	A	A		0 / 0	0–0	–
Cincinnati Masters	A	A	A	A		0 / 0	0–0	–
Shanghai Masters	NH	Q2	A	Q1		0 / 0	0–0	–
Paris Masters	A	A	A	A		0 / 0	0–0	–
Win–loss	0–0	0–0	0–0	0–0	0–0	0 / 0	0–0	–

== ATP Challenger Tour finals ==
=== Doubles: 1 (runner-up) ===
Legend ATP Challenger Tour (0–1)

Result	W–L	Date	Tournament	Tier	Surface	Partner	Opponents	Score
Loss	0–1	May 2023	Tunis Open, Tunisia	Challenger	Clay	(Tunisia) Aziz Ouakaa	(France) Théo Arribagé (France) Luca Sanchez	6–4, 3–6, [5–10]

== ITF Tour finals ==
=== Singles: 4 (2 titles, 2 runner-ups) ===
Legend ITF WTT (2–2)	Finals by surface Hard (1–2) Grass (1–0)

Result	W–L	Date	Tournament	Tier	Surface	Opponent	Score
Loss	0–1	Feb 2022	M25 Canberra, Australia	WTT	Hard	(Australia) Dane Sweeny	7–5, 6–7^{(6–8)}, 3–6
Loss	0–2	Mar 2022	M25 Bendigo, Australia	WTT	Hard	(Australia) Omar Jasika	1–6, 2–6
Win	1–2	Jul 2024	M25 Nottingham, UK	WTT	Grass	(United Kingdom) George Loffhagen	6–0, 6–1
Win	2–2	Aug 2024	M25 Roehampton, UK	WTT	Hard	(Japan) Masamichi Imamura	7–5, 4–6, 6–3

=== Doubles: 1 (runner-up) ===
Legend ITF WTT (0–1)

Result	W–L	Date	Tournament	Tier	Surface	Partner	Opponents	Score
Loss	0–1	Oct 2022	M25 Cairns, Australia	WTT	Hard	(Australia) Adam Walton	(United States) Kyle Seelig (Northern Mariana Islands) Colin Sinclair	4–6, 2–6
