= Dane Sweeny =

Australian tennis player (born 2001)

- Sweeny at the 2026 Wimbledon Championships
- Country (sports): Australia
- Residence: Sunshine Coast, Queensland, Australia
- Born: 12 February 2001 (age 25) Penrith, New South Wales, Australia
- Height: 1.70 m (5 ft 7 in)
- Plays: Right-handed (Two-Handed Backhand)
- Coach: Clay Sweeny
- Prize money: US $1,295,300

Singles
- Career record: 5–8
- Career titles: 0
- Highest ranking: No. 109 (14 September 2026)
- Current ranking: No. 109 (14 September 2026)

Grand Slam singles results
- Australian Open: 2R (2026)
- French Open: Q1 (2024, 2026)
- Wimbledon: 1R (2026)
- US Open: 3R (2026)

Doubles
- Career record: 2–5
- Career titles: 0
- Highest ranking: No. 160 (14 November 2022)
- Current ranking: No. 253 (14 September 2026)

Grand Slam doubles results
- Australian Open: 3R (2022)

Grand Slam mixed doubles results
- Australian Open: 1R (2024)
- Last updated on: 14 September 2026.

Dane Sweeny (born 12 February 2001) is an Australian professional tennis player. He has a career-high ATP singles ranking of No. 109 achieved on 14 September 2026 and a best doubles ranking of No. 160 reached on 14 November 2022.

== Early life ==
Sweeny was born in Sydney and moved to the Sunshine Coast at three years of age, where he was raised and attended Siena Catholic College before finishing his secondary schooling at Brisbane Boys' College. He began playing tennis at two years of age and played the majority of his junior tennis at the Mooloolaba Tennis Club.

== Career ==
=== 2015–2019: Juniors, First pro matches ===
In August 2015, Sweeny represented Australia at the ITF World Junior Tennis Finals in Prostějov, Czech Republic. He reached a career high of No. 21 in the ITF Junior Rankings on 27 May 2019.

In March 2018, Sweeny made his ITF Men's World Tennis Tour main draw debut in Mornington, Victoria. He made his ATP Challenger Tour main draw debut in October 2019 in Traralgon.

=== 2021: ATP debut and first win ===
In January 2021, Sweeny made the third and final round of the 2021 Australian Open – Men's singles qualifying.

Sweeny was awarded a wildcard into the 2021 Great Ocean Road Open, where he made his ATP Tour main draw debut. Sweeny defeated Nam Ji-sung in the first round before losing to Aljaž Bedene in round two.

In August and September, Sweeny played in the ITF circuit in Monastir, reaching the semifinal in one. On 27 September 2021, Sweeny achieved a career-high singles ranking of No. 533. He broke into the world's top 500 on 15 November 2021. Sweeny ended 2021 with a singles ranking of No. 492.

=== 2022: Major doubles & Top 250 singles debuts ===
Sweeny reached the second round of the 2022 Australian Open – Men's singles qualifying. He made his debut in doubles as a wildcard pair partnering compatriot Li Tu, reaching the third round where they lost to second seeds Rajeev Ram/Joe Salisbury.

In February 2022, Sweeny won his first ITF titles in singles and doubles in Canberra.

He made his top 250 debut on 3 October 2022 at world No. 247.

=== 2023–2026: Major, Masters debuts and first wins, top 150 ===
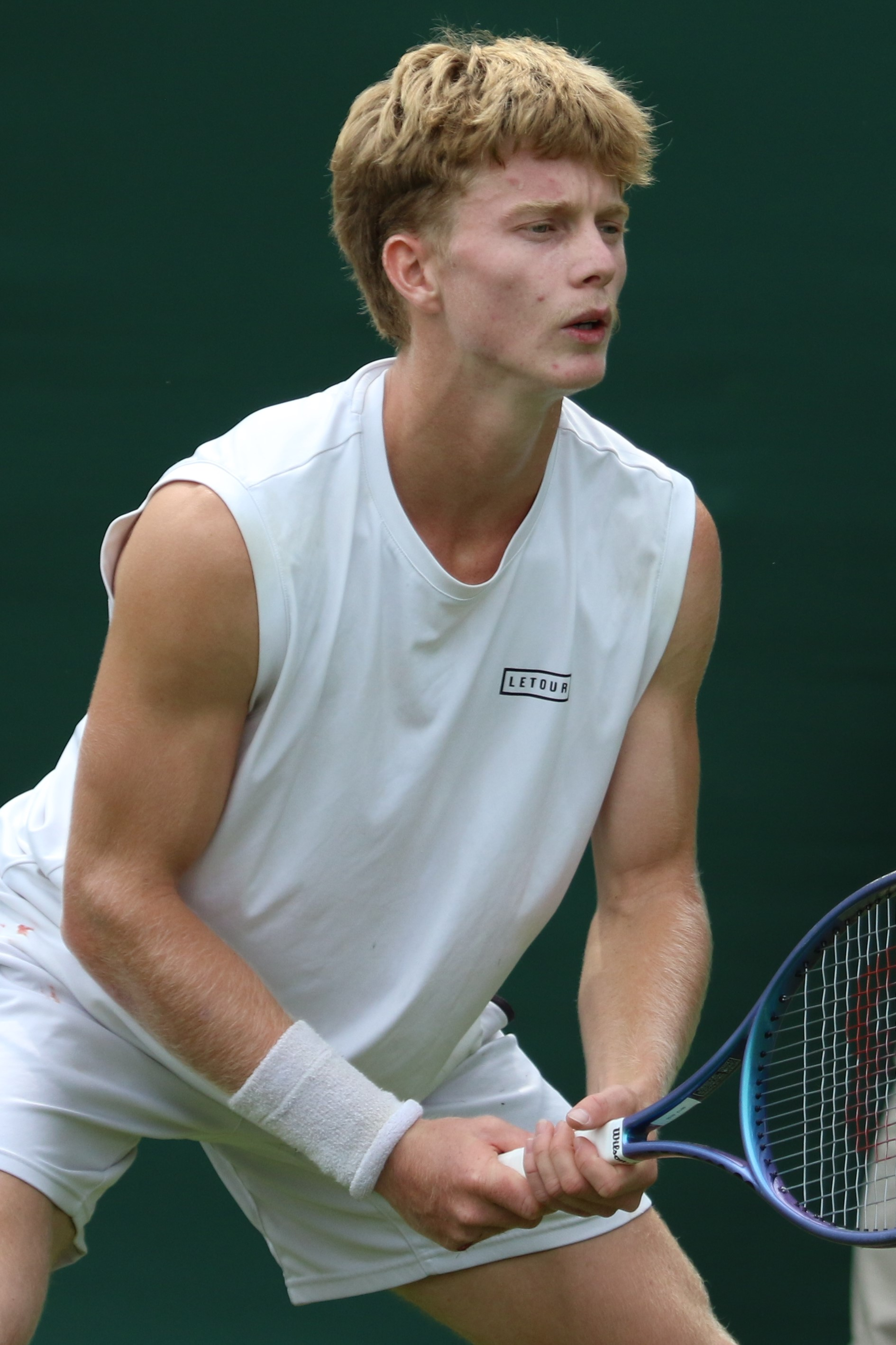
Sweeny at the 2023 Wimbledon Championships

In October 2023, Sweeny qualified for a Masters 1000 at the Shanghai for the first time. He recorded his first main-draw win at this level against Taro Daniel, which was also his first top 100 win.

He qualified for the 2024 Australian Open, making his Grand Slam debut, but lost to Francisco Cerúndolo. Sweeny recorded his first Grand Slam win at the 2026 Australian Open defeating Gael Monfils, as a qualifier.

== Performance timelines ==
Key
W	F	SF	QF	#R	RR	Q#	P#	DNQ	A	Z#	PO	G	S	B	NMS	NTI	P	NH

(W) winner; (F) finalist; (SF) semifinalist; (QF) quarterfinalist; (#R) rounds 4, 3, 2, 1; (RR) round-robin stage; (Q#) qualification round; (P#) preliminary round; (DNQ) did not qualify; (A) absent; (Z#) Davis/Fed Cup Zonal Group (with number indication) or (PO) play-off; (G) gold, (S) silver or (B) bronze Olympic/Paralympic medal; (NMS) not a Masters tournament; (NTI) not a Tier I tournament; (P) postponed; (NH) not held; (SR) strike rate (events won / competed); (W–L) win–loss record.
To avoid confusion and double counting, these charts are updated at the conclusion of a tournament or when the player's participation has ended.

Only main-draw results in ATP Tour, Grand Slam tournaments, Davis Cup and Olympic Games are included in win–loss records.

=== Singles ===
Current after the 2026 Rolex Shanghai Masters.

Tournament	2021	2022	2023	2024	2025	2026	SR	W–L	Win %
Grand Slam tournaments
Australian Open	Q3	Q2	Q2	1R	Q2	2R	0 / 2	1–2	33%
French Open	A	A	A	Q1	Q1	Q1	0 / 0	0–0	–
Wimbledon	A	A	Q1	Q1	Q1	1R	0 / 1	0–1	0%
US Open	A	A	A	A	A	3R	0 / 1	2–1	67%
Win–loss	0–0	0–0	0–0	0–1	0–0	3–3	0 / 4	3–4	43%
ATP Masters 1000
Indian Wells						Q2	0 / 0	0–0	–
Miami Open						Q1	0 / 0	0–0	–
Canadian Open			Q1			Q1	0 / 0	0–0	–
Cincinnati Open						Q1	0 / 0	0–0	–
Shanghai Masters	NH		2R			Q2	0 / 1	1–1	50%
Career statistics
Tournaments	1	0	2	1	0	5	total: 9		
Titles	0	0	0	0	0	0	total: 0		
Finals	0	0	0	0	0	0	total: 0		
Overall win–loss	1–1	0–0	1–2	0–1	0–0	3–5	0 / 9	5–9	36%
Year-end ranking	492	251	256	345	215				

== ATP Challenger Tour finals ==
=== Singles: 3 (1 title, 2 runner-ups) ===
Legend ATP Challenger Tour (1–2)

Result	W–L	Date	Tournament	Tier	Surface	Opponent	Score
Loss	0–1	Feb 2024	Burnie International II, Australia	Challenger	Hard	(Australia) Adam Walton	2–6, 6–7^{(4–7)}
Loss	0–2	Nov 2025	Playford Tennis International, Australia	Challenger	Hard	(Australia) Rinky Hijikata	0–6, 7–6^{(10–8)}, 4–6
Win	1–2	Feb 2026	Queensland International, Australia	Challenger	Hard	(Australia) Tristan Schoolkate	3–6, 7–6^{(7–5)}, 7–6^{(7–4)}

=== Doubles: 3 (3 runner-ups) ===
Legend ATP Challenger Tour (0–3)

Result	W–L	Date	Tournament	Tier	Surface	Partner	Opponents	Score
Loss	0–1	Sep 2024	LTP Men's Open, US	Challenger	Hard	(Australia) Calum Puttergill	(Australia) Luke Saville (Australia) Tristan Schoolkate	7–6^{(7–1)}, 1–6, [3–10]
Loss	0–2	Nov 2025	NSW Open, Australia	Challenger	Hard	(Australia) Calum Puttergill	(Australia) Rinky Hijikata (Australia) Marc Polmans	0–6, 4–6
Loss	0–3	Feb 2026	Queensland International, Australia	Challenger	Hard	(Australia) Jake Delaney	(Australia) Blake Bayldon (Australia) Marc Polmans	4–6, 4–6

== ITF World Tennis Tour finals ==
=== Singles: 20 (15 titles, 5 runner-ups) ===
Legend ITF WTT (14–5)	Finals by surface Hard (14–4) Clay (1–0) Grass (0–1)

Result	W–L	Date	Tournament	Tier	Surface	Opponent	Score
Loss	0–1	Nov 2021	M25 Saint-Dizier, France	WTT	Hard (i)	(Australia) Li Tu	6–1, 1–6, 4–6
Win	1–1	Feb 2022	M25 Canberra, Australia	WTT	Hard	(Australia) Akira Santillan	6–3, 4–6, 7–5
Win	2–1	Feb 2022	M25 Canberra, Australia	WTT	Hard	(Australia) James McCabe	5–7, 7–6^{(8–6)}, 6–3
Win	3–1	Jul 2022	M15 Caloundra, Australia	WTT	Hard	(Australia) Thomas Fancutt	6–3, 6—4
Loss	3–2	Nov 2021	M15 Caloundra, Australia	WTT	Hard	(Australia) Dayne Kelly	1–6, 6–1, 5–7
Win	4–2	Sep 2022	M25 Darwin, Australia	WTT	Hard	(United States) Kyle Seelig	4–6, 6–2, 6–1
Win	5–2	Sep 2022	M25 Darwin, Australia	WTT	Hard	(Australia) Omar Jasika	6–3, 6–7^{(4–7)}, 6–4
Win	6–2	Oct 2022	M25 Cairns, Australia	WTT	Hard	(Australia) Philip Sekulic	6–2, 6–3
Win	7–2	Mar 2023	M25 Canberra, Australia	WTT	Clay	(Australia) Marc Polmans	6–7^{(1–7)}, 7–6^{(7–5)}, 6–4
Loss	7–3	Mar 2025	M25 Swan Hill, Australia	WTT	Grass	(Australia) Blake Ellis	6–2, 3–6, 6–7^{(4–7)}
Loss	7–4	Jul 2025	M15 Los Angeles, US	WTT	Hard	(United States) Kyle Kang	5–7, 4–6
Win	8–4	Jul 2025	M15 San Diego, US	WTT	Hard	(United States) Keegan Smith	1–6, 6–3, 6–2
Win	9–4	Aug 2025	M15 Brisbane, Australia	WTT	Hard	(Australia) Derek Pham	walkover
Win	10–4	Aug 2025	M15 Brisbane, Australia	WTT	Hard	(Australia) Jesse Delaney	6–2, 6–2
Win	11–4	Aug 2025	M25 Taipei, Chinese Taipei	WTT	Hard	(South Korea) Kwon Soon-woo	6–2, 3–0 ret.
Win	12–4	Sep 2025	M25 Tamworth, Australia	WTT	Hard	(Australia) Marc Polmans	2–6, 6–4, 6–3
Win	13–4	Sep 2025	M25 Tamworth, Australia	WTT	Hard	(Australia) Matthew Dellavedova	6–2, 6–1
Win	14–4	Sep 2025	M25 Perth, Australia	WTT	Hard	(Australia) Scott Jones	6–1, 6–3
Loss	14–5	Oct 2025	M25 Brisbane, Australia	WTT	Hard	(Australia) Marc Polmans	6–1, 6–7^{(2–7)}, 3–6
Win	15–5	Oct 2025	M25 Brisbane, Australia	WTT	Hard	(Denmark) Carl Emil Overbeck	6–7^{(5–7)}, 6–3, 6–2

=== Doubles: 10 (6 titles, 4 runner-ups) ===
Legend ITF WTT (6–4)	Finals by surface Hard (5–3) Clay (1–1)

Result	W–L	Date	Tournament	Tier	Surface	Partner	Opponents	Score
Loss	0–1	Mar 2019	M15 Mornington, Australia	WTT	Clay	(Australia) Thomas Fancutt	(Australia) Calum Puttergill (Australia) Brandon Walkin	1–6, 5–7
Win	1–1	Aug 2021	M15 Monastir, Tunisia	WTT	Hard	(Australia) Blake Ellis	(Kazakhstan) Timur Khabibulin (Kazakhstan) Beibit Zhukayev	7–6, 6–1
Win	2–1	Feb 2022	M25 Canberra, Australia	WTT	Hard	(Australia) Li Tu	(Australia) Jayden Court (Australia) David Hough	6–3, 7–5
Loss	2–2	Mar 2022	M25 Bendigo, Australia	WTT	Hard	(Australia) Li Tu	(Australia) Akira Santillan (Australia) Philip Sekulic	5–7, 7–6, [7–10]
Win	3–2	Mar 2022	M25 Canberra, Australia	WTT	Clay	(Australia) Li Tu	(Australia) Matthew Romios (Ukraine) Eric Vanshelboim	7–6, 3–6, [10–7]
Loss	3–3	Mar 2022	M25 Monastir, Tunisia	WTT	Hard	(Australia) Jayden Court	(Chinese Taipei) Hsu Yu-hsiou (China) Sun Fajing	6–7^{(4–7)}, 3–6,
Win	4–3	Jun 2022	M25 Tulsa, US	WTT	Hard	(Chinese Taipei) Hsu Yu-hsiou	(United States) Ezekiel Clark (United States) Nathan Ponwith	6–3, 6–2
Loss	4–4	Jun 2022	M25 Dallas, US	WTT	Hard	(Chinese Taipei) Hsu Yu-hsiou	(United States) Govind Nanda (United States) Tyler Zink	4–6, 4–6
Win	5–4	Sep 2022	M25 Darwin, Australia	WTT	Hard	(Australia) Calum Puttergill	(Australia) Joshua Charlton (Australia) Adam Walton	7–6^{(7–5)}, 6–3
Win	6–4	Sep 2025	M25 Perth, Australia	WTT	Hard	(Australia) Calum Puttergill	(Australia) Chen Dong (Poland) Filip Peliwo	6–4, 6–7^{(6–8)}, [10–1]
