= 2019 ITF Men's World Tennis Tour (July–September) =

The 2019 ITF Men's World Tennis Tour is the 2019 edition of the second tier tour for men's professional tennis. It is organised by the International Tennis Federation and is a tier below the ATP Tour. The ITF Men's World Tennis Tour includes tournaments with prize money ranging from $15,000 to $25,000.

== Key ==
M25 tournaments
M15 tournaments

== Month ==
=== July ===
Week of	Tournament	Winner	Runners-up	Semifinalists	Quarterfinalists
July 1	Buenos Aires, Argentina; Clay; M25; Singles and Doubles Draws	(Argentina) Juan Pablo Ficovich; 7–5, 6–7^{(5–7)}, 6–3	(Argentina) Francisco Cerúndolo	(Argentina) Camilo Ugo Carabelli (Argentina) Juan Bautista Otegui	(Argentina) Santiago Rodríguez Taverna (Argentina) Maximiliano Estévez (Argentina) Francisco Comesaña (Argentina) Hernán Casanova
July 1	Buenos Aires, Argentina; Clay; M25; Singles and Doubles Draws	(Argentina) Hernán Casanova (Argentina) Maximiliano Estévez; 6–3, 6–2	(Brazil) Mateus Alves (Chile) Matías Soto	(Argentina) Camilo Ugo Carabelli (Argentina) Juan Bautista Otegui	(Argentina) Santiago Rodríguez Taverna (Argentina) Maximiliano Estévez (Argentina) Francisco Comesaña (Argentina) Hernán Casanova
July 1	Lasne, Belgium; Clay; M25; Singles and Doubles Draws	(Belgium) Jeroen Vanneste; 6–1, 7–5	(Germany) Jeremy Jahn	(France) Rayane Roumane (Sweden) Markus Eriksson	(Russia) Savriyan Danilov (Chile) Bastián Malla (Belgium) Zizou Bergs (Argentina) Facundo Mena
July 1	Lasne, Belgium; Clay; M25; Singles and Doubles Draws	(United States) Hunter Johnson (United States) Yates Johnson; 6–3, 7–6^{(7–5)}	(Peru) Sergio Galdós (Argentina) Facundo Mena	(France) Rayane Roumane (Sweden) Markus Eriksson	(Russia) Savriyan Danilov (Chile) Bastián Malla (Belgium) Zizou Bergs (Argentina) Facundo Mena
July 1	Kunshan, China; Hard; M25; Singles and Doubles Draws	(China) Sun Fajing; 6–2, 6–2	(Chinese Taipei) Yang Tsung-hua	(Sweden) Jonathan Mridha (China) Xia Haitong	(United States) Michael Zhu (Japan) Shinji Hazawa (New Zealand) Rhett Purcell (China) Li Yuanfeng
July 1	Kunshan, China; Hard; M25; Singles and Doubles Draws	(China) Gao Xin (China) Sun Fajing; 6–2, 7–6^{(7–5)}	(China) Hua Runhao (China) Zeng Shihong	(Sweden) Jonathan Mridha (China) Xia Haitong	(United States) Michael Zhu (Japan) Shinji Hazawa (New Zealand) Rhett Purcell (China) Li Yuanfeng
July 1	Bourg-en-Bresse, France; Clay; M25; Singles and Doubles Draws	(France) Maxime Hamou; 6–4, 6–7^{(4–7)}, 6–3	(France) Kyrian Jacquet	(France) Sadio Doumbia (France) Maxime Chazal	(France) Jonathan Eysseric (France) Florent Bax (Morocco) Lamine Ouahab (France) Pierre Faivre
July 1	Bourg-en-Bresse, France; Clay; M25; Singles and Doubles Draws	(France) Matteo Martineau (France) Arthur Reymond; 6–1, 7–6^{(7–4)}	(France) Sadio Doumbia (France) Fabien Reboul	(France) Sadio Doumbia (France) Maxime Chazal	(France) Jonathan Eysseric (France) Florent Bax (Morocco) Lamine Ouahab (France) Pierre Faivre
July 1	Cuneo, Italy; Clay; M25; Singles and Doubles Draws	(Dominican Republic) José Hernández-Fernández; 6–7^{(6–8)}, 6–4, 7–5	(Italy) Francesco Forti	(Argentina) Tomás Martín Etcheverry (Netherlands) Gijs Brouwer	(Italy) Julian Ocleppo (Italy) Andrea Basso (Bulgaria) Dimitar Kuzmanov (Netherlands) Jelle Sels
July 1	Cuneo, Italy; Clay; M25; Singles and Doubles Draws	(Romania) Victor Vlad Cornea (Romania) Alexandru Jecan; 6–4, 6–3	(Argentina) Tomás Martín Etcheverry (Italy) Andrea Gola	(Argentina) Tomás Martín Etcheverry (Netherlands) Gijs Brouwer	(Italy) Julian Ocleppo (Italy) Andrea Basso (Bulgaria) Dimitar Kuzmanov (Netherlands) Jelle Sels
July 1	Bakio, Spain; Hard; M25; Singles and Doubles Draws	(France) Laurent Lokoli; 6–3, 6–3	(France) Hugo Grenier	(Spain) Andrés Artuñedo (Spain) Carlos Boluda-Purkiss	(United States) Peter Kobelt (Spain) Carlos Sánchez Jover (Russia) Alexander Zhurbin (Spain) Pablo Vivero González
July 1	Bakio, Spain; Hard; M25; Singles and Doubles Draws	(Colombia) Alejandro Gómez (United States) Junior Alexander Ore; 1–6, 6–2, [11–9]	(United States) Alafia Ayeni (Spain) Carlos Sánchez Jover	(Spain) Andrés Artuñedo (Spain) Carlos Boluda-Purkiss	(United States) Peter Kobelt (Spain) Carlos Sánchez Jover (Russia) Alexander Zhurbin (Spain) Pablo Vivero González
July 1	Saarlouis, Germany; Clay; M15; Singles and Doubles Draws	(Dominican Republic) Nick Hardt; 6–0, 6–4	(Italy) Fabrizio Ornago	(Brazil) Bruno Sant'Anna (Germany) Dominik Böhler	(Russia) Bogdan Bobrov (Germany) Pascal Meis (Germany) Adrian Obert (Slovakia) Lukáš Klein
July 1	Saarlouis, Germany; Clay; M15; Singles and Doubles Draws	(Australia) James Frawley (Germany) Mats Rosenkranz; 6–4, 6–2	(Luxembourg) Tom Diederich (Germany) Lasse Muscheites	(Brazil) Bruno Sant'Anna (Germany) Dominik Böhler	(Russia) Bogdan Bobrov (Germany) Pascal Meis (Germany) Adrian Obert (Slovakia) Lukáš Klein
July 1	Cancún, Mexico; Hard; M15; Singles and Doubles Draws	(Colombia) Nicolás Mejía; 6–2, 7–5	(United States) Nicolas Moreno de Alboran	(United States) Nick Chappell (United States) Alexander Lebedev	(Mexico) Gerardo López Villaseñor (United Kingdom) Ben Jones (The Bahamas) Justin Roberts (United States) Austin Rapp
July 1	Cancún, Mexico; Hard; M15; Singles and Doubles Draws	(United States) Austin Rapp (United States) Reese Stalder; 7–6^{(7–3)}, 6–2	(United States) Nick Chappell (United States) Grey Hamilton	(United States) Nick Chappell (United States) Alexander Lebedev	(Mexico) Gerardo López Villaseñor (United Kingdom) Ben Jones (The Bahamas) Justin Roberts (United States) Austin Rapp
July 1	The Hague, Netherlands; Clay; M15; Singles and Doubles Draws	(Argentina) Matías Zukas; 6–4, 6–2	(Netherlands) Ryan Nijboer	(Netherlands) Igor Sijsling (France) Geoffrey Blancaneaux	(France) Manuel Guinard (Netherlands) Michiel de Krom (France) Yanais Laurent (Netherlands) Guy den Heijer
July 1	The Hague, Netherlands; Clay; M15; Singles and Doubles Draws	(Netherlands) Jesper de Jong (Netherlands) Ryan Nijboer; 6–1, 6–4	(Netherlands) Michiel de Krom (Brazil) João Lucas Reis da Silva	(Netherlands) Igor Sijsling (France) Geoffrey Blancaneaux	(France) Manuel Guinard (Netherlands) Michiel de Krom (France) Yanais Laurent (Netherlands) Guy den Heijer
July 1	Wrocław, Poland; Clay; M15; Singles and Doubles Draws	(Czech Republic) Václav Šafránek; 6–3, 3–6, 6–3	(Czech Republic) Petr Nouza	(Russia) Alexander Shevchenko (Russia) Alexey Zakharov	(Romania) Dan Alexandru Tomescu (Czech Republic) Tomáš Jiroušek (Poland) Michał Dembek (Poland) Maciej Rajski
July 1	Wrocław, Poland; Clay; M15; Singles and Doubles Draws	(Poland) Jan Zieliński (Poland) Kacper Żuk; 6–4, 6–3	(Poland) Jan Gałka (Poland) Piotr Galus	(Russia) Alexander Shevchenko (Russia) Alexey Zakharov	(Romania) Dan Alexandru Tomescu (Czech Republic) Tomáš Jiroušek (Poland) Michał Dembek (Poland) Maciej Rajski
July 1	Idanha-a-Nova, Portugal; Hard; M15; Singles and Doubles Draws	(Portugal) Nuno Borges; 3–6, 6–3, 6–2	(Portugal) Fred Gil	(Portugal) Tiago Cação (Germany) Robert Strombachs	(United Kingdom) Aidan McHugh (United Kingdom) Andrew Watson (Bolivia) Juan Carlos Aguilar (Croatia) Matija Pecotić
July 1	Idanha-a-Nova, Portugal; Hard; M15; Singles and Doubles Draws	(Portugal) Nuno Borges (Portugal) Francisco Cabral; 6–4, 6–3	(Portugal) Francisco Dias (Portugal) Gonçalo Falcão	(Portugal) Tiago Cação (Germany) Robert Strombachs	(United Kingdom) Aidan McHugh (United Kingdom) Andrew Watson (Bolivia) Juan Carlos Aguilar (Croatia) Matija Pecotić
July 1	Belgrade, Serbia; Clay; M15; Singles and Doubles Draws	(Serbia) Marko Miladinović; 6–3, 6–3	(Hungary) Fábián Marozsán	(Romania) Bogdan Ionuț Apostol (Hungary) Gergely Madarász	(Bulgaria) Alexandar Lazarov (Bosnia and Herzegovina) Nerman Fatić (Montenegro) Ljubomir Čelebić (Serbia) Marko Tepavac
July 1	Belgrade, Serbia; Clay; M15; Singles and Doubles Draws	(Russia) Artem Dubrivnyy (Russia) Alexander Ovcharov; 6–7^{(5–7)}, 6–1, [10–7]	(Serbia) Strahinja Rakić (Slovenia) Matic Špec	(Romania) Bogdan Ionuț Apostol (Hungary) Gergely Madarász	(Bulgaria) Alexandar Lazarov (Bosnia and Herzegovina) Nerman Fatić (Montenegro) Ljubomir Čelebić (Serbia) Marko Tepavac
July 1	Tabarka, Tunisia; Clay; M15; Singles and Doubles Draws	(Argentina) Nicolás Alberto Arreche; 6–3, 6–2	(France) Quentin Robert	(Argentina) Manuel Peña López (Switzerland) Jakub Paul	(Italy) Marco Miceli (Italy) Davide Pontoglio (Austria) David Pichler (Argentina) Guido Iván Justo
July 1	Tabarka, Tunisia; Clay; M15; Singles and Doubles Draws	(Austria) David Pichler (Italy) Alexander Weis; 7–5, 7–5	(Peru) Alexander Merino (Argentina) Manuel Peña López	(Argentina) Manuel Peña López (Switzerland) Jakub Paul	(Italy) Marco Miceli (Italy) Davide Pontoglio (Austria) David Pichler (Argentina) Guido Iván Justo
July 1	Pittsburgh, United States; Clay; M15; Singles and Doubles Draws	(Moldova) Alexander Cozbinov; 2–6, 6–2, 6–1	(Sweden) Simon Freund	(United States) Michael Shabaz (United States) Paul Oosterbaan	(Romania) Dragoș Constantin Ignat (United States) Tyler Mercier (United States) Maksim Tikhomirov (United States) Adam El Mihdawy
July 1	Pittsburgh, United States; Clay; M15; Singles and Doubles Draws	(Sweden) Simon Freund (United States) John Harrison Richmond; 6–2, 4–6, [10–6]	(United States) Maksim Tikhomirov (Ukraine) Volodymyr Uzhylovskyi	(United States) Michael Shabaz (United States) Paul Oosterbaan	(Romania) Dragoș Constantin Ignat (United States) Tyler Mercier (United States) Maksim Tikhomirov (United States) Adam El Mihdawy
July 8	Qujing, China; Hard (indoor); M25; Singles and Doubles Draws	(China) Bai Yan; 6–3, 6–1	(China) Sun Fajing	(Chinese Taipei) Yang Tsung-hua (Japan) Jumpei Yamasaki	(China) Wang Chukang (Sweden) Jonathan Mridha (Japan) Rio Noguchi (Japan) Kento Takeuchi
July 8	Qujing, China; Hard (indoor); M25; Singles and Doubles Draws	(China) Hua Runhao (China) Sun Fajing; 6–1, 6–1	(Philippines) Francis Alcantara (New Zealand) Rhett Purcell	(Chinese Taipei) Yang Tsung-hua (Japan) Jumpei Yamasaki	(China) Wang Chukang (Sweden) Jonathan Mridha (Japan) Rio Noguchi (Japan) Kento Takeuchi
July 8	Ajaccio, France; Hard; M25+H; Singles and Doubles Draws	(France) Laurent Lokoli; 3–6, 7–5, 6–3	(France) Quentin Robert	(France) Hugo Grenier (Argentina) Agustín Velotti	(Brazil) Thiago Seyboth Wild (France) Antoine Cornut-Chauvinc (United States) Alafia Ayeni (Zimbabwe) Benjamin Lock
July 8	Ajaccio, France; Hard; M25+H; Singles and Doubles Draws	(France) Yanais Laurent (Brazil) Thiago Seyboth Wild; 6–4, 1–6, [10–8]	(Germany) Fabian Fallert (Germany) Hendrik Jebens	(France) Hugo Grenier (Argentina) Agustín Velotti	(Brazil) Thiago Seyboth Wild (France) Antoine Cornut-Chauvinc (United States) Alafia Ayeni (Zimbabwe) Benjamin Lock
July 8	Casinalbo, Italy; Clay; M25; Singles and Doubles Draws	(Sweden) Christian Lindell; 7–6^{(7–5)}, 5–7, 6–3	(Australia) Christopher O'Connell	(Romania) Alexandru Jecan (Netherlands) Gijs Brouwer	(Italy) Francesco Forti (France) Sadio Doumbia (Brazil) Pedro Sakamoto (Peru) Juan Pablo Varillas
July 8	Casinalbo, Italy; Clay; M25; Singles and Doubles Draws	(Croatia) Ivan Sabanov (Croatia) Matej Sabanov; 6–7^{(6–8)}, 6–3, [10–7]	(France) Sadio Doumbia (Russia) Kirill Kivattsev	(Romania) Alexandru Jecan (Netherlands) Gijs Brouwer	(Italy) Francesco Forti (France) Sadio Doumbia (Brazil) Pedro Sakamoto (Peru) Juan Pablo Varillas
July 8	Getxo, Spain; Clay; M25; Singles and Doubles Draws	(France) Jules Okala; 6–4, 6–1	(Spain) Carlos Boluda-Purkiss	(Spain) Pol Martín Tiffon (Colombia) Alejandro Gómez	(Bolivia) Luis Diego Chávez Villalpando (Chile) Bastián Malla (Belgium) Michael Geerts (Bolivia) Federico Zeballos
July 8	Getxo, Spain; Clay; M25; Singles and Doubles Draws	(Colombia) Alejandro Gómez (United States) Junior Alexander Ore; 6–2, 6–7^{(5–7)}, [10–6]	(Spain) Sergio Martos Gornés (Spain) Jaume Pla Malfeito	(Spain) Pol Martín Tiffon (Colombia) Alejandro Gómez	(Bolivia) Luis Diego Chávez Villalpando (Chile) Bastián Malla (Belgium) Michael Geerts (Bolivia) Federico Zeballos
July 8	Buenos Aires, Argentina; Clay; M15; Singles and Doubles Draws	(Argentina) Genaro Alberto Olivieri; 6–4, 2–6, 7–6^{(7–4)}	(Argentina) Juan Pablo Ficovich	(Argentina) Hernán Casanova (Peru) Nicolás Álvarez	(Argentina) Camilo Ugo Carabelli (Argentina) Juan Bautista Otegui (Argentina) Juan Ignacio Galarza (Argentina) Maximiliano Estévez
July 8	Buenos Aires, Argentina; Clay; M15; Singles and Doubles Draws	(Argentina) Leonardo Aboian (Argentina) Juan Pablo Grassi Mazzuchi; 6–3, 6–3	(Peru) Nicolás Álvarez (Bolivia) Sebastián Eguez	(Argentina) Hernán Casanova (Peru) Nicolás Álvarez	(Argentina) Camilo Ugo Carabelli (Argentina) Juan Bautista Otegui (Argentina) Juan Ignacio Galarza (Argentina) Maximiliano Estévez
July 8	Telfs, Austria; Clay; M15; Singles and Doubles Draws	(Switzerland) Sandro Ehrat; 6–4, 6–7^{(6–8)}, 6–3	(Austria) Alexander Erler	(Czech Republic) Petr Nouza (Czech Republic) Vít Kopřiva	(Austria) Jakob Aichhorn (Netherlands) Mick Veldheer (Austria) David Pichler (Czech Republic) Tomáš Macháč
July 8	Telfs, Austria; Clay; M15; Singles and Doubles Draws	(Czech Republic) Michal Konečný (Ukraine) Vitaliy Sachko; 6–2, 6–3	(Czech Republic) Vít Kopřiva (Austria) David Pichler	(Czech Republic) Petr Nouza (Czech Republic) Vít Kopřiva	(Austria) Jakob Aichhorn (Netherlands) Mick Veldheer (Austria) David Pichler (Czech Republic) Tomáš Macháč
July 8	Marburg, Germany; Clay; M15; Singles and Doubles Draws	(Germany) Louis Wessels; 7–6^{(7–4)}, 7–6^{(7–5)}	(Netherlands) Jesper de Jong	(Peru) Mauricio Echazú (Netherlands) Ryan Nijboer	(Germany) Kai Wehnelt (Germany) Mats Rosenkranz (Czech Republic) Robin Staněk (Switzerland) Mirko Martinez
July 8	Marburg, Germany; Clay; M15; Singles and Doubles Draws	(Romania) Vasile Antonescu (Romania) Patrick Grigoriu; 7–6^{(7–5)}, 4–6, [10–6]	(Australia) James Frawley (Germany) Mats Rosenkranz	(Peru) Mauricio Echazú (Netherlands) Ryan Nijboer	(Germany) Kai Wehnelt (Germany) Mats Rosenkranz (Czech Republic) Robin Staněk (Switzerland) Mirko Martinez
July 8	Almaty, Kazakhstan; Hard; M15; Singles and Doubles Draws	(Kazakhstan) Andrey Golubev; 6–1, 6–2	(Kazakhstan) Denis Yevseyev	(Russia) Konstantin Kravchuk (United States) Sebastian Korda	(South Korea) Nam Ji-sung (Russia) Evgenii Tiurnev (Kazakhstan) Dostanbek Tashbulatov (Turkey) Marsel İlhan
July 8	Almaty, Kazakhstan; Hard; M15; Singles and Doubles Draws	(Kazakhstan) Andrey Golubev (Russia) Konstantin Kravchuk; 6–3, 6–2	(United States) Sebastian Korda (Kazakhstan) Denis Yevseyev	(Russia) Konstantin Kravchuk (United States) Sebastian Korda	(South Korea) Nam Ji-sung (Russia) Evgenii Tiurnev (Kazakhstan) Dostanbek Tashbulatov (Turkey) Marsel İlhan
July 8	Vilnius, Lithuania; Clay; M15; Singles and Doubles Draws	(Russia) Ivan Nedelko; 6–4, 5–7, 6–1	(Russia) Savriyan Danilov	(Russia) Denis Klok (France) Laurent Rochette	(Latvia) Mārtiņš Podžus (Ukraine) Georgii Kravchenko (Argentina) Matías Zukas (Lithuania) Robertas Vrzesinski
July 8	Vilnius, Lithuania; Clay; M15; Singles and Doubles Draws	(Russia) Mikhail Korovin (Ukraine) Oleg Prihodko; 7–6^{(7–3)}, 7–6^{(7–3)}	(Lithuania) Feliksas Sakalauskas (Lithuania) Tomas Vaišė	(Russia) Denis Klok (France) Laurent Rochette	(Latvia) Mārtiņš Podžus (Ukraine) Georgii Kravchenko (Argentina) Matías Zukas (Lithuania) Robertas Vrzesinski
July 8	Cancún, Mexico; Hard; M15; Singles and Doubles Draws	(Colombia) Nicolás Mejía; 6–1, 6–2	(United States) Gage Brymer	(United Kingdom) Jack Draper (United States) Nicolas Moreno de Alboran	(United States) Aron Pierce (Bolivia) Alejandro Mendoza (Japan) Naoki Nakagawa (Mexico) Luis Patiño
July 8	Cancún, Mexico; Hard; M15; Singles and Doubles Draws	(Antigua and Barbuda) Jody Maginley (The Bahamas) Justin Roberts; 6–3, 6–2	(United States) Eric Hadigian (United States) Tanner Smith	(United Kingdom) Jack Draper (United States) Nicolas Moreno de Alboran	(United States) Aron Pierce (Bolivia) Alejandro Mendoza (Japan) Naoki Nakagawa (Mexico) Luis Patiño
July 8	Lima, Peru; Clay; M15; Singles and Doubles Draws	(Brazil) Oscar José Gutierrez; 6–3, 6–1	(Argentina) Facundo Juárez	(Peru) Conner Huertas del Pino (Chile) Matías Soto	(Colombia) Cristian Rodríguez (Brazil) Rafael Matos (Peru) Jorge Panta (Argentina) Francisco Comesaña
July 8	Lima, Peru; Clay; M15; Singles and Doubles Draws	(Brazil) Oscar José Gutierrez (Brazil) Rafael Matos; 7–6^{(7–5)}, 6–1	(Colombia) José Daniel Bendeck (Colombia) Cristian Rodríguez	(Peru) Conner Huertas del Pino (Chile) Matías Soto	(Colombia) Cristian Rodríguez (Brazil) Rafael Matos (Peru) Jorge Panta (Argentina) Francisco Comesaña
July 8	Idanha-a-Nova, Portugal; Hard; M15; Singles and Doubles Draws	(Portugal) Fred Gil; 6–1, 6–2	(Spain) David Jordà Sanchis	(United Kingdom) Jonathan Gray (Germany) Robert Strombachs	(France) Baptiste Crepatte (Portugal) Francisco Dias (United Kingdom) Aidan McHugh (Portugal) Francisco Cabral
July 8	Idanha-a-Nova, Portugal; Hard; M15; Singles and Doubles Draws	(Portugal) Francisco Dias (Portugal) Gonçalo Falcão; 5–7, 6–4, [12–10]	(Portugal) Francisco Cabral (Germany) Robert Strombachs	(United Kingdom) Jonathan Gray (Germany) Robert Strombachs	(France) Baptiste Crepatte (Portugal) Francisco Dias (United Kingdom) Aidan McHugh (Portugal) Francisco Cabral
July 8	Tabarka, Tunisia; Clay; M15; Singles and Doubles Draws	(Italy) Enrico Dalla Valle; 6–4, 6–4	(Argentina) Manuel Peña López	(Argentina) Nicolás Alberto Arreche (Italy) Marco Miceli	(Argentina) Guido Iván Justo (Norway) Lukas Hellum Lilleengen (Argentina) Fermín Tenti (Italy) Gabriele Maria Noce
July 8	Tabarka, Tunisia; Clay; M15; Singles and Doubles Draws	(Argentina) Franco Feitt (Argentina) Guido Iván Justo; 7–6^{(8–6)}, 6–4	(Argentina) Nicolás Alberto Arreche (Argentina) Manuel Peña López	(Argentina) Nicolás Alberto Arreche (Italy) Marco Miceli	(Argentina) Guido Iván Justo (Norway) Lukas Hellum Lilleengen (Argentina) Fermín Tenti (Italy) Gabriele Maria Noce
July 8	Norman, United States; Hard; M15; Singles and Doubles Draws	(United Kingdom) Mark Whitehouse; 7–6^{(7–5)}, 6–4	(United States) Ezekiel Clark	(United States) Ronan Jachuck (United States) Austin Rapp	(United States) Jake Van Emburgh (United States) Sumit Sarkar (United States) Nathan Ponwith (United States) Andrew Fenty
July 8	Norman, United States; Hard; M15; Singles and Doubles Draws	(United Kingdom) David Fox (United Kingdom) Mark Whitehouse; 6–4, 3–6, [10–7]	(Moldova) Alexander Cozbinov (Venezuela) Ricardo Rodríguez	(United States) Ronan Jachuck (United States) Austin Rapp	(United States) Jake Van Emburgh (United States) Sumit Sarkar (United States) Nathan Ponwith (United States) Andrew Fenty
July 15	Taipei, Taiwan; Hard; M25; Singles and Doubles Draws	(China) Bai Yan; 6–4, 6–4	(Chinese Taipei) Hsu Yu-hsiou	(Japan) Rio Noguchi (Chinese Taipei) Yu Cheng-yu	(Japan) Sora Fukuda (Japan) Taisei Ichikawa (Australia) Jesse Delaney (Chinese Taipei) Liu Shao-fan
July 15	Taipei, Taiwan; Hard; M25; Singles and Doubles Draws	(Japan) Sora Fukuda (South Korea) Song Min-kyu; 6–4, 2–6, [10–3]	(Japan) Makoto Ochi (Japan) Renta Tokuda	(Japan) Rio Noguchi (Chinese Taipei) Yu Cheng-yu	(Japan) Sora Fukuda (Japan) Taisei Ichikawa (Australia) Jesse Delaney (Chinese Taipei) Liu Shao-fan
July 15	Kassel, Germany; Clay; M25+H; Singles and Doubles Draws	(Germany) Lucas Gerch; 6–7^{(3–7)}, 6–3, 6–4	(France) Jules Okala	(France) Sadio Doumbia (Germany) Louis Wessels	(Germany) Valentin Günther (Brazil) Orlando Luz (Czech Republic) Matěj Vocel (Chinese Taipei) Tseng Chun-hsin
July 15	Kassel, Germany; Clay; M25+H; Singles and Doubles Draws	(Australia) James Frawley (Germany) Mats Rosenkranz; 7–5, 7–6^{(12–10)}	(France) Sadio Doumbia (France) Fabien Reboul	(France) Sadio Doumbia (Germany) Louis Wessels	(Germany) Valentin Günther (Brazil) Orlando Luz (Czech Republic) Matěj Vocel (Chinese Taipei) Tseng Chun-hsin
July 15	Lima, Peru; Clay; M25; Singles and Doubles Draws	(Argentina) Francisco Cerúndolo; 6–2, 6–1	(Peru) Nicolás Álvarez	(Brazil) Oscar José Gutierrez (Argentina) Facundo Juárez	(Brazil) Rafael Matos (Chile) Matías Soto (Argentina) Juan Pablo Ficovich (Brazil) João Pedro Sorgi
July 15	Lima, Peru; Clay; M25; Singles and Doubles Draws	(Brazil) João Pedro Sorgi (Argentina) Camilo Ugo Carabelli; Walkover	(Peru) Arklon Huertas del Pino (Peru) Conner Huertas del Pino	(Brazil) Oscar José Gutierrez (Argentina) Facundo Juárez	(Brazil) Rafael Matos (Chile) Matías Soto (Argentina) Juan Pablo Ficovich (Brazil) João Pedro Sorgi
July 15	Gandia, Spain; Clay; M25; Singles and Doubles Draws	(Spain) Jaume Pla Malfeito; 6–1, 7–6^{(7–0)}	(Brazil) Jordan Correia	(France) Hugo Gaston (Spain) Pedro Vives Marcos	(Spain) Alberto Barroso Campos (Spain) Carlos Sánchez Jover (Switzerland) Rémy Bertola (Spain) Benjamín Winter López
July 15	Gandia, Spain; Clay; M25; Singles and Doubles Draws	(France) Jonathan Eysseric (France) Hugo Gaston; 6–4, 1–6, [10–4]	(Colombia) Alejandro Gómez (United States) Junior Alexander Ore	(France) Hugo Gaston (Spain) Pedro Vives Marcos	(Spain) Alberto Barroso Campos (Spain) Carlos Sánchez Jover (Switzerland) Rémy Bertola (Spain) Benjamín Winter López
July 15	Iowa City, United States; Hard; M25; Singles and Doubles Draws	(United States) Alex Rybakov; 7–6^{(7–5)}, 5–7, 7–6^{(7–3)}	(United States) John McNally	(Tunisia) Aziz Dougaz (Argentina) Axel Geller	(Lebanon) Hady Habib (United States) Preston Touliatos (United States) Evan Zhu (United States) Errol Smith
July 15	Iowa City, United States; Hard; M25; Singles and Doubles Draws	(United Kingdom) Lloyd Glasspool (Colombia) Alejandro González; 6–2, 6–1	(United Kingdom) Jack Findel-Hawkins (United Kingdom) Mark Whitehouse	(Tunisia) Aziz Dougaz (Argentina) Axel Geller	(Lebanon) Hady Habib (United States) Preston Touliatos (United States) Evan Zhu (United States) Errol Smith
July 15	Kramsach, Austria; Clay; M15; Singles and Doubles Draws	(Russia) Ronald Slobodchikov; 6–2, 6–0	(Austria) Sandro Kopp	(Germany) Sebastian Prechtel (Austria) David Pichler	(Italy) Edoardo Lavagno (Switzerland) Patrik Hartmeier (Netherlands) Mick Veldheer (Netherlands) Bart van der Berg
July 15	Kramsach, Austria; Clay; M15; Singles and Doubles Draws	(Austria) Lukas Krainer (Australia) William Ma; 7–6^{(7–4)}, 6–4	(Argentina) Mariano Kestelboim (Brazil) Wilson Leite	(Germany) Sebastian Prechtel (Austria) David Pichler	(Italy) Edoardo Lavagno (Switzerland) Patrik Hartmeier (Netherlands) Mick Veldheer (Netherlands) Bart van der Berg
July 15	Pärnu, Estonia; Clay; M15; Singles and Doubles Draws	(Estonia) Jürgen Zopp; 6–4, 6–3	(Russia) Bogdan Bobrov	(Ukraine) Nikita Mashtakov (Russia) Alexander Shevchenko	(Ukraine) Georgii Kravchenko (Italy) Luigi Sorrentino (Estonia) Vladimir Ivanov (Lithuania) Julius Tverijonas
July 15	Pärnu, Estonia; Clay; M15; Singles and Doubles Draws	(Estonia) Vladimir Ivanov (Russia) Maxim Ratniuk; 3–6, 6–4, [10–5]	(Estonia) Kenneth Raisma (Estonia) Jürgen Zopp	(Ukraine) Nikita Mashtakov (Russia) Alexander Shevchenko	(Ukraine) Georgii Kravchenko (Italy) Luigi Sorrentino (Estonia) Vladimir Ivanov (Lithuania) Julius Tverijonas
July 15	Uriage-les-Bains, France; Clay; M15; Singles and Doubles Draws	(France) Alexis Gautier; 7–5, 2–6, 6–4	(France) Gabriel Petit	(France) Ugo Blanchet (France) Gianni Mina	(Switzerland) Yann Marti (France) Samuel Brosset (France) Sébastien Boltz (Russia) Ivan Davydov
July 15	Uriage-les-Bains, France; Clay; M15; Singles and Doubles Draws	(France) Antoine Fouché (France) Mick Lescure; 6–3, 3–6, [10–6]	(France) Joffrey de Schepper (France) Pierre Faivre	(France) Ugo Blanchet (France) Gianni Mina	(Switzerland) Yann Marti (France) Samuel Brosset (France) Sébastien Boltz (Russia) Ivan Davydov
July 15	Telavi, Georgia; Clay; M15; Singles and Doubles Draws	(Czech Republic) David Poljak; 6–4, 6–1	(Uzbekistan) Jurabek Karimov	(Russia) Yan Bondarevskiy (Russia) Yan Sabanin	(Georgia (country)) George Tsivadze (Uzbekistan) Saida'lo Saidkarimov (Ukraine) Eric Vanshelboim (Russia) Alexey Zakharov
July 15	Telavi, Georgia; Clay; M15; Singles and Doubles Draws	(Turkey) Koray Kırcı (Czech Republic) David Poljak; 7–5, 7–6^{(8–6)}	(Russia) Yan Bondarevskiy (Georgia (country)) George Tsivadze	(Russia) Yan Bondarevskiy (Russia) Yan Sabanin	(Georgia (country)) George Tsivadze (Uzbekistan) Saida'lo Saidkarimov (Ukraine) Eric Vanshelboim (Russia) Alexey Zakharov
July 15	Gubbio, Italy; Clay; M15; Singles and Doubles Draws	(Argentina) Gonzalo Villanueva; 7–5, 6–2	(Italy) Francesco Passaro	(Italy) Adelchi Virgili (Argentina) Facundo Díaz Acosta	(Argentina) Tomás Martín Etcheverry (Italy) Omar Giacalone (Italy) Giorgio Ricca (Italy) Giovanni Fonio
July 15	Gubbio, Italy; Clay; M15; Singles and Doubles Draws	(Russia) Kirill Kivattsev (Argentina) Gonzalo Villanueva; 6–1, 6–4	(Italy) Mattia Frinzi (Italy) Giorgio Portaluri	(Italy) Adelchi Virgili (Argentina) Facundo Díaz Acosta	(Argentina) Tomás Martín Etcheverry (Italy) Omar Giacalone (Italy) Giorgio Ricca (Italy) Giovanni Fonio
July 15	Cancún, Mexico; Hard; M15; Singles and Doubles Draws	(The Bahamas) Justin Roberts; 3–6, 7–6^{(10–8)}, 6–4	(United States) Kalman Boyd	(United Kingdom) Jack Draper (Colombia) Nicolás Mejía	(United States) Christian Langmo (United States) Felix Corwin (France) Jean Thirouin (Mexico) Luis Patiño
July 15	Cancún, Mexico; Hard; M15; Singles and Doubles Draws	(United Kingdom) Jack Draper (Colombia) Nicolás Mejía; 4–6, 7–6^{(7–2)}, [10–5]	(United States) Aron Pierce (United States) Noah Schachter	(United Kingdom) Jack Draper (Colombia) Nicolás Mejía	(United States) Christian Langmo (United States) Felix Corwin (France) Jean Thirouin (Mexico) Luis Patiño
July 15	Tangier, Morocco; Clay; M15; Singles and Doubles Draws	(Morocco) Lamine Ouahab; 6–0, 6–2	(France) Matthieu Perchicot	(Argentina) Fermín Tenti (Russia) Kristian Lozan	(France) Louis Tessa (Morocco) Adam Moundir (Spain) José Francisco Vidal Azorín (Morocco) Anas Fattar
July 15	Tangier, Morocco; Clay; M15; Singles and Doubles Draws	(France) Louis Dussin (Belgium) Martin van der Meerschen; 6–4, 6–0	(Italy) Andrea Bessire (Italy) Francesco Bessire	(Argentina) Fermín Tenti (Russia) Kristian Lozan	(France) Louis Tessa (Morocco) Adam Moundir (Spain) José Francisco Vidal Azorín (Morocco) Anas Fattar
July 15	Castelo Branco, Portugal; Hard; M15; Singles and Doubles Draws	(Colombia) Eduardo Struvay; 6–4, 7–6^{(7–4)}	(Spain) Nicolás Álvarez Varona	(Portugal) Nuno Borges (France) Albano Olivetti	(France) Antoine Cornut-Chauvinc (France) Rayane Roumane (Ukraine) Marat Deviatiarov (Spain) David Jordà Sanchis
July 15	Castelo Branco, Portugal; Hard; M15; Singles and Doubles Draws	(Ukraine) Marat Deviatiarov (Colombia) Eduardo Struvay; 6–4, 7–5	(Portugal) Francisco Dias (Portugal) Gonçalo Falcão	(Portugal) Nuno Borges (France) Albano Olivetti	(France) Antoine Cornut-Chauvinc (France) Rayane Roumane (Ukraine) Marat Deviatiarov (Spain) David Jordà Sanchis
July 15	Piešťany, Slovakia; Clay; M15; Singles and Doubles Draws	(Slovakia) Lukáš Klein; 6–1, 4–6, 6–1	(Hungary) Fábián Marozsán	(Serbia) Marko Miladinović (Russia) Artem Dubrivnyy	(Czech Republic) Petr Nouza (Czech Republic) Vít Kopřiva (Romania) Vladislav Melnic (Latvia) Mārtiņš Podžus
July 15	Piešťany, Slovakia; Clay; M15; Singles and Doubles Draws	(Latvia) Jānis Podžus (Latvia) Mārtiņš Podžus; 6–7^{(3–7)}, 7–6^{(7–1)}, [10–7]	(Czech Republic) Vít Kopřiva (Czech Republic) Petr Nouza	(Serbia) Marko Miladinović (Russia) Artem Dubrivnyy	(Czech Republic) Petr Nouza (Czech Republic) Vít Kopřiva (Romania) Vladislav Melnic (Latvia) Mārtiņš Podžus
July 15	Tabarka, Tunisia; Clay; M15; Singles and Doubles Draws	(Italy) Enrico Dalla Valle; 3–6, 6–4, 6–4	(Argentina) Sebastián Báez	(Argentina) Nicolás Alberto Arreche (Italy) Erik Crepaldi	(Croatia) Duje Ajduković (Italy) Simone Roncalli (Tunisia) Ameur Ben Hassen (Italy) Alexander Weis
July 15	Tabarka, Tunisia; Clay; M15; Singles and Doubles Draws	(Netherlands) Maikel Borg (Netherlands) Max Houkes; 6–4, 6–7^{(4–7)}, [12–10]	(Argentina) Nicolás Alberto Arreche (Italy) Alexander Weis	(Argentina) Nicolás Alberto Arreche (Italy) Erik Crepaldi	(Croatia) Duje Ajduković (Italy) Simone Roncalli (Tunisia) Ameur Ben Hassen (Italy) Alexander Weis
July 22	Taipei, Taiwan; Hard; M25; Singles and Doubles Draws	(Japan) Renta Tokuda; 6–2, 3–6, 6–0	(Chinese Taipei) Yang Tsung-hua	(Japan) Makoto Ochi (Chinese Taipei) Lin Wei-de	(Chinese Taipei) Chen Ti (Japan) Seita Watanabe (China) Bai Yan (Japan) Yusuke Takahashi
July 22	Taipei, Taiwan; Hard; M25; Singles and Doubles Draws	(Japan) Yuya Kibi (Japan) Seita Watanabe; 6–2, 6–2	(Japan) Yusuke Takahashi (Japan) Jumpei Yamasaki	(Japan) Makoto Ochi (Chinese Taipei) Lin Wei-de	(Chinese Taipei) Chen Ti (Japan) Seita Watanabe (China) Bai Yan (Japan) Yusuke Takahashi
July 22	Troyes, France; Clay; M25; Singles and Doubles Draws	(Brazil) Orlando Luz; 6–0, 7–5	(France) Jules Okala	(France) Maxime Hamou (Italy) Fabrizio Ornago	(Brazil) Bruno Sant'Anna (France) Clément Tabur (France) Pierre Faivre (France) Gianni Mina
July 22	Troyes, France; Clay; M25; Singles and Doubles Draws	(France) Joffrey de Schepper (France) Pierre Faivre; 2–6, 6–4, [10–5]	(France) Dan Added (Brazil) Orlando Luz	(France) Maxime Hamou (Italy) Fabrizio Ornago	(Brazil) Bruno Sant'Anna (France) Clément Tabur (France) Pierre Faivre (France) Gianni Mina
July 22	Pontedera, Italy; Clay; M25+H; Singles and Doubles Draws	(Italy) Enrico Dalla Valle; 7–6^{(7–4)}, 7–5	(Italy) Giulio Zeppieri	(Argentina) Gonzalo Villanueva (Italy) Andrea Basso	(Italy) Giovanni Fonio (Argentina) Facundo Díaz Acosta (Italy) Gianluca Di Nicola (France) Maxime Chazal
July 22	Pontedera, Italy; Clay; M25+H; Singles and Doubles Draws	(Croatia) Ivan Sabanov (Croatia) Matej Sabanov; 7–6^{(7–5)}, 6–2	(Australia) Adam Taylor (Australia) Jason Taylor	(Argentina) Gonzalo Villanueva (Italy) Andrea Basso	(Italy) Giovanni Fonio (Argentina) Facundo Díaz Acosta (Italy) Gianluca Di Nicola (France) Maxime Chazal
July 22	Porto, Portugal; Hard; M25; Singles and Doubles Draws	(Spain) Pablo Vivero González; 6–2, 6–2	(Portugal) Daniel Rodrigues	(France) Hugo Grenier (France) Antoine Cornut-Chauvinc	(Portugal) Luís Faria (Spain) Nicolás Álvarez Varona (France) Rayane Roumane (Israel) Daniel Cukierman
July 22	Porto, Portugal; Hard; M25; Singles and Doubles Draws	(Canada) Martin Beran (Israel) Daniel Cukierman; 7–6^{(8–6)}, 7–5	(Portugal) Francisco Dias (Portugal) Gonçalo Falcão	(France) Hugo Grenier (France) Antoine Cornut-Chauvinc	(Portugal) Luís Faria (Spain) Nicolás Álvarez Varona (France) Rayane Roumane (Israel) Daniel Cukierman
July 22	Dénia, Spain; Clay; M25; Singles and Doubles Draws	(Spain) Carlos Alcaraz; 6–4, 6–3	(Kazakhstan) Timofei Skatov	(Spain) Jaume Pla Malfeito (Spain) Carlos Boluda-Purkiss	(Spain) Pablo Llamas Ruiz (Spain) Eduard Esteve Lobato (Spain) Carlos Sánchez Jover (Spain) Diego Augusto Barreto Sánchez
July 22	Dénia, Spain; Clay; M25; Singles and Doubles Draws	(Spain) Sergio Martos Gornés (Spain) Jaume Pla Malfeito; 6–4, 6–2	(Spain) Alberto Barroso Campos (Italy) Raúl Brancaccio	(Spain) Jaume Pla Malfeito (Spain) Carlos Boluda-Purkiss	(Spain) Pablo Llamas Ruiz (Spain) Eduard Esteve Lobato (Spain) Carlos Sánchez Jover (Spain) Diego Augusto Barreto Sánchez
July 22	Nonthaburi, Thailand; Hard; M25; Singles and Doubles Draws	(Japan) Yuta Shimizu; 6–4, 6–0	(Ukraine) Vladyslav Orlov	(Australia) Harry Bourchier (India) Manish Sureshkumar	(Australia) Alexander Crnokrak (Australia) Blake Ellis (Turkey) Marsel İlhan (Uzbekistan) Sergey Fomin
July 22	Nonthaburi, Thailand; Hard; M25; Singles and Doubles Draws	(Thailand) Sanchai Ratiwatana (Thailand) Sonchat Ratiwatana; 4–6, 6–2, [10–4]	(India) Arjun Kadhe (Kazakhstan) Timur Khabibulin	(Australia) Harry Bourchier (India) Manish Sureshkumar	(Australia) Alexander Crnokrak (Australia) Blake Ellis (Turkey) Marsel İlhan (Uzbekistan) Sergey Fomin
July 22	Champaign, United States; Hard; M25; Singles and Doubles Draws	(United States) Jenson Brooksby; 6–2, 6–1	(United States) Oliver Crawford	(United Kingdom) Liam Broady (United States) Aleksandar Kovacevic	(Argentina) Axel Geller (South Africa) Ruan Roelofse (United States) Keenan Mayo (United States) Cannon Kingsley
July 22	Champaign, United States; Hard; M25; Singles and Doubles Draws	(Bolivia) Juan Carlos Aguilar (Argentina) Axel Geller; 6–4, 6–3	(United States) Keenan Mayo (Venezuela) Ricardo Rodríguez	(United Kingdom) Liam Broady (United States) Aleksandar Kovacevic	(Argentina) Axel Geller (South Africa) Ruan Roelofse (United States) Keenan Mayo (United States) Cannon Kingsley
July 22	Wels, Austria; Clay; M15; Singles and Doubles Draws	(Austria) Alexander Erler; 6–4, 6–4	(Croatia) Duje Kekez	(Czech Republic) Tomáš Jiroušek (Netherlands) Mick Veldheer	(Slovenia) Tom Kočevar-Dešman (Ukraine) Vitaliy Sachko (Peru) Arklon Huertas del Pino (Brazil) Wilson Leite
July 22	Wels, Austria; Clay; M15; Singles and Doubles Draws	(Bosnia and Herzegovina) Aziz Kijametović (Slovenia) Sven Lah; 6–2, 6–3	(United Kingdom) Toby Martin (Ukraine) Anatoliy Petrenko	(Czech Republic) Tomáš Jiroušek (Netherlands) Mick Veldheer	(Slovenia) Tom Kočevar-Dešman (Ukraine) Vitaliy Sachko (Peru) Arklon Huertas del Pino (Brazil) Wilson Leite
July 22	Telavi, Georgia; Clay; M15; Singles and Doubles Draws	(Ukraine) Nikita Mashtakov; 6–3, 6–4	(United States) Dennis Uspensky	(Belarus) Mikalai Haliak (Russia) Shalva Dzhanashiya	(Kazakhstan) Dostanbek Tashbulatov (Uzbekistan) Saida'lo Saidkarimov (United States) Maksim Tikhomirov (Georgia (country)) George Tsivadze
July 22	Telavi, Georgia; Clay; M15; Singles and Doubles Draws	(Belarus) Ivan Liutarevich (Czech Republic) David Poljak; 6–3, 6–4	(Russia) Shalva Dzhanashiya (Russia) Yan Sabanin	(Belarus) Mikalai Haliak (Russia) Shalva Dzhanashiya	(Kazakhstan) Dostanbek Tashbulatov (Uzbekistan) Saida'lo Saidkarimov (United States) Maksim Tikhomirov (Georgia (country)) George Tsivadze
July 22	Bad Schussenried, Germany; Clay; M15; Singles and Doubles Draws	(Germany) Marvin Netuschil; 6–2, 6–1	(Germany) Adrian Obert	(Slovenia) Nik Razboršek (Argentina) Juan Ignacio Galarza	(Netherlands) Colin van Beem (Germany) Sebastian Prechtel (Germany) Kai Wehnelt (Germany) Dominik Böhler
July 22	Bad Schussenried, Germany; Clay; M15; Singles and Doubles Draws	(Netherlands) Michiel de Krom (Netherlands) Roy Sarut de Valk; 7–5, 6–4	(Germany) Constantin Schmitz (Germany) Kai Wehnelt	(Slovenia) Nik Razboršek (Argentina) Juan Ignacio Galarza	(Netherlands) Colin van Beem (Germany) Sebastian Prechtel (Germany) Kai Wehnelt (Germany) Dominik Böhler
July 22	Cancún, Mexico; Hard; M15; Singles and Doubles Draws	(United States) Christian Langmo; 6–2, 6–4	(France) Jean Thirouin	(United States) Gage Brymer (Argentina) Maximiliano Estévez	(Mexico) Lucas Gómez (United States) Felix Corwin (United States) Connor Farren (United States) Aaron Pierce
July 22	Cancún, Mexico; Hard; M15; Singles and Doubles Draws	(France) Jaimee Floyd Angele (France) Ronan Joncour; 3–6, 6–3, [10–8]	(United States) Felix Corwin (Australia) Brandon Walkin	(United States) Gage Brymer (Argentina) Maximiliano Estévez	(Mexico) Lucas Gómez (United States) Felix Corwin (United States) Connor Farren (United States) Aaron Pierce
July 22	Casablanca, Morocco; Clay; M15; Singles and Doubles Draws	(Bulgaria) Alexandar Lazarov; 6–4, 7–5	(Brazil) Jordan Correia	(Russia) Kristian Lozan (Argentina) Fermín Tenti	(Argentina) Guido Iván Justo (Republic of Ireland) Simon Carr (Chile) Michel Vernier (Italy) Nicolò Turchetti
July 22	Casablanca, Morocco; Clay; M15; Singles and Doubles Draws	(Morocco) Anas Fattar (Morocco) Adam Moundir; 6–4, 6–1	(France) Pierre Delage (France) Nathan Seateun	(Russia) Kristian Lozan (Argentina) Fermín Tenti	(Argentina) Guido Iván Justo (Republic of Ireland) Simon Carr (Chile) Michel Vernier (Italy) Nicolò Turchetti
July 22	Tabarka, Tunisia; Clay; M15; Singles and Doubles Draws	(Argentina) Sebastián Báez; 6–2, 6–2	(Italy) Alexander Weis	(United Kingdom) Stuart Parker (Belgium) Benjamin D'Hoe	(Italy) Gabriele Maria Noce (United States) Miles Jones (Italy) Alessandro Ingarao (Argentina) Ignacio Carou
July 22	Tabarka, Tunisia; Clay; M15; Singles and Doubles Draws	(Netherlands) Mats Hermans (Netherlands) Bart Stevens; 7–6^{(7–4)}, 6–2	(Jordan) Mousa Alkotop (Russia) Alexander Boborykin	(United Kingdom) Stuart Parker (Belgium) Benjamin D'Hoe	(Italy) Gabriele Maria Noce (United States) Miles Jones (Italy) Alessandro Ingarao (Argentina) Ignacio Carou
July 29	Dublin, Ireland; Carpet; M25; Singles and Doubles Draws	(Netherlands) Igor Sijsling; 6–4, 7–6^{(10–8)}	(United Kingdom) Ryan Peniston	(Republic of Ireland) Simon Carr (United Kingdom) Andrew Watson	(United Kingdom) Millen Hurrion (Republic of Ireland) Peter Bothwell (United Kingdom) Jack Findel-Hawkins (Croatia) Matija Pecotić
July 29	Dublin, Ireland; Carpet; M25; Singles and Doubles Draws	(Republic of Ireland) Julian Bradley (United Kingdom) Jack Findel-Hawkins; 6–1, 7–6^{(7–5)}	(United Kingdom) Ben Jones (United Kingdom) Joshua Paris	(Republic of Ireland) Simon Carr (United Kingdom) Andrew Watson	(United Kingdom) Millen Hurrion (Republic of Ireland) Peter Bothwell (United Kingdom) Jack Findel-Hawkins (Croatia) Matija Pecotić
July 29	Bolzano, Italy; Clay; M25; Singles and Doubles Draws	(Italy) Riccardo Balzerani; 6–3, 3–6, 6–2	(Germany) Elmar Ejupovic	(Brazil) Daniel Dutra da Silva (Sweden) Christian Lindell	(Kazakhstan) Denis Yevseyev (Italy) Pietro Rondoni (Netherlands) Mick Veldheer (Italy) Gianluca Di Nicola
July 29	Bolzano, Italy; Clay; M25; Singles and Doubles Draws	(Ukraine) Danylo Kalenichenko (Kazakhstan) Denis Yevseyev; 6–2, 6–2	(Italy) Gianluca Di Nicola (Italy) Nicolò Inserra	(Brazil) Daniel Dutra da Silva (Sweden) Christian Lindell	(Kazakhstan) Denis Yevseyev (Italy) Pietro Rondoni (Netherlands) Mick Veldheer (Italy) Gianluca Di Nicola
July 29	Nonthaburi, Thailand; Hard; M25; Singles and Doubles Draws	(Japan) Renta Tokuda; 6–3, 6–3	(Uzbekistan) Sanjar Fayziev	(Japan) Shintaro Imai (Chinese Taipei) Hsu Yu-hsiou	(Turkey) Marsel İlhan (Uzbekistan) Sergey Fomin (Japan) Yuta Shimizu (Japan) Rio Noguchi
July 29	Nonthaburi, Thailand; Hard; M25; Singles and Doubles Draws	(Chinese Taipei) Hsu Yu-hsiou (Japan) Yuta Shimizu; 6–2, 6–3	(Uzbekistan) Sanjar Fayziev (Uzbekistan) Sergey Fomin	(Japan) Shintaro Imai (Chinese Taipei) Hsu Yu-hsiou	(Turkey) Marsel İlhan (Uzbekistan) Sergey Fomin (Japan) Yuta Shimizu (Japan) Rio Noguchi
July 29	Roehampton, United Kingdom; Hard; M25; Singles and Doubles Draws	(United Kingdom) Jack Draper; 4–6, 6–3, 6–2	(Israel) Daniel Cukierman	(United Kingdom) Alastair Gray (United Kingdom) Paul Jubb	(France) Quentin Robert (France) Gabriel Petit (United Kingdom) Mark Whitehouse (United Kingdom) Charles Broom
July 29	Roehampton, United Kingdom; Hard; M25; Singles and Doubles Draws	(United Kingdom) Alastair Gray (United Kingdom) Ewan Moore; 6–3, 7–6^{(7–5)}	(United Kingdom) Scott Clayton (United Kingdom) Luke Johnson	(United Kingdom) Alastair Gray (United Kingdom) Paul Jubb	(France) Quentin Robert (France) Gabriel Petit (United Kingdom) Mark Whitehouse (United Kingdom) Charles Broom
July 29	Decatur, United States; Hard; M25; Singles and Doubles Draws	(United States) Jenson Brooksby; 6–1, 6–4	(Argentina) Santiago Rodríguez Taverna	(Lebanon) Hady Habib (United States) Christian Langmo	(Tunisia) Skander Mansouri (Argentina) Axel Geller (United States) Aleksandar Kovacevic (Italy) Liam Caruana
July 29	Decatur, United States; Hard; M25; Singles and Doubles Draws	(Bolivia) Juan Carlos Aguilar (Argentina) Axel Geller; 6–1, 6–3	(Argentina) Alan Kohen (Argentina) Santiago Rodríguez Taverna	(Lebanon) Hady Habib (United States) Christian Langmo	(Tunisia) Skander Mansouri (Argentina) Axel Geller (United States) Aleksandar Kovacevic (Italy) Liam Caruana
July 29	Brussels, Belgium; Clay; M15; Singles and Doubles Draws	(Belgium) Christopher Heyman; 2–6, 6–0, 6–4	(Netherlands) Guy den Heijer	(Dominican Republic) Nick Hardt (Netherlands) Jesper de Jong	(Germany) Dominik Böhler (Russia) Vladimir Korolev (Belgium) Michael Geerts (Argentina) Gonzalo Villanueva
July 29	Brussels, Belgium; Clay; M15; Singles and Doubles Draws	(Germany) Luca Gelhardt (Dominican Republic) Nick Hardt; 6–4, 6–4	(Netherlands) Jesper de Jong (Netherlands) Alec Deckers	(Dominican Republic) Nick Hardt (Netherlands) Jesper de Jong	(Germany) Dominik Böhler (Russia) Vladimir Korolev (Belgium) Michael Geerts (Argentina) Gonzalo Villanueva
July 29	Telavi, Georgia; Clay; M15; Singles and Doubles Draws	(Russia) Yan Bondarevskiy; 6–4, 6–0	(Bulgaria) Alexander Donski	(Estonia) Kristjan Tamm (Turkey) Cengiz Aksu	(Uzbekistan) Jurabek Karimov (Georgia (country)) George Tsivadze (Russia) Mikhail Fufygin (Estonia) Daniil Glinka
July 29	Telavi, Georgia; Clay; M15; Singles and Doubles Draws	(Bulgaria) Alexander Donski (United States) Maksim Tikhomirov; 6–4, 6–4	(Russia) Yan Bondarevskiy (Georgia (country)) George Tsivadze	(Estonia) Kristjan Tamm (Turkey) Cengiz Aksu	(Uzbekistan) Jurabek Karimov (Georgia (country)) George Tsivadze (Russia) Mikhail Fufygin (Estonia) Daniil Glinka
July 29	Cancún, Mexico; Hard; M15; Singles and Doubles Draws	(United States) Joshua Ortlip; 6–4, 7–6^{(7–2)}	(France) Jean Thirouin	(United States) Mwendwa Mbithi (Chile) Daniel Antonio Núñez	(United States) Tyler Mercier (Bolivia) Alejandro Mendoza (Haiti) Hillel Rousseau (United States) Gage Brymer
July 29	Cancún, Mexico; Hard; M15; Singles and Doubles Draws	(United States) Joshua Ortlip (Brazil) Breno Souza Plentz; 6–2, 6–7^{(3–7)}, [10–5]	(United States) Tyler Mercier (Australia) Brandon Walkin	(United States) Mwendwa Mbithi (Chile) Daniel Antonio Núñez	(United States) Tyler Mercier (Bolivia) Alejandro Mendoza (Haiti) Hillel Rousseau (United States) Gage Brymer
July 29	Agadir, Morocco; Clay; M15; Singles and Doubles Draws	(Morocco) Lamine Ouahab; 5–7, 6–4, 6–1	(Argentina) Nicolás Alberto Arreche	(Brazil) Jordan Correia (Morocco) Adam Moundir	(Spain) José Francisco Vidal Azorín (Italy) Nicolò Turchetti (Algeria) Nazim Makhlouf (Chile) Michel Vernier
July 29	Agadir, Morocco; Clay; M15; Singles and Doubles Draws	(Morocco) Adam Moundir (Morocco) Lamine Ouahab; 2–6, 6–1, [10–6]	(Argentina) Nicolás Alberto Arreche (Italy) Nicolò Turchetti	(Brazil) Jordan Correia (Morocco) Adam Moundir	(Spain) José Francisco Vidal Azorín (Italy) Nicolò Turchetti (Algeria) Nazim Makhlouf (Chile) Michel Vernier
July 29	Chitila, Romania; Clay; M15; Singles and Doubles Draws	(Argentina) Hernán Casanova; 6–4, 7–5	(Romania) Bogdan Ionuț Apostol	(Argentina) Facundo Juárez (France) Quentin Folliot	(Serbia) Marko Tepavac (Ukraine) Oleksii Krutykh (Italy) Alessandro Petrone (Sweden) Christoffer Solberg
July 29	Chitila, Romania; Clay; M15; Singles and Doubles Draws	(France) Amaury Delmas (Ukraine) Marat Deviatiarov; 7–6^{(7–5)}, 6–3	(Romania) Vladimir Filip (Romania) Luca George Tatomir	(Argentina) Facundo Juárez (France) Quentin Folliot	(Serbia) Marko Tepavac (Ukraine) Oleksii Krutykh (Italy) Alessandro Petrone (Sweden) Christoffer Solberg
July 29	Novi Sad, Serbia; Clay; M15; Singles and Doubles Draws	(Peru) Arklon Huertas del Pino; 6–3, 7–6^{(7–2)}	(Montenegro) Ljubomir Čelebić	(Slovenia) Tom Kočevar-Dešman (Peru) Conner Huertas del Pino	(Bulgaria) Alexandar Lazarov (Poland) Maciej Rajski (Serbia) Marko Miladinović (Hungary) Gábor Borsos
July 29	Novi Sad, Serbia; Clay; M15; Singles and Doubles Draws	(Peru) Arklon Huertas del Pino (Peru) Conner Huertas del Pino; 7–6^{(10–8)}, 4–6, [10–3]	(Czech Republic) Tadeáš Paroulek (Ukraine) Vadym Ursu	(Slovenia) Tom Kočevar-Dešman (Peru) Conner Huertas del Pino	(Bulgaria) Alexandar Lazarov (Poland) Maciej Rajski (Serbia) Marko Miladinović (Hungary) Gábor Borsos
July 29	Xàtiva, Spain; Clay; M15; Singles and Doubles Draws	(Spain) Imanol López Morillo; 7–6^{(9–7)}, 6–4	(Spain) Pol Toledo Bagué	(Spain) Carlos López Montagud (Kazakhstan) Timofei Skatov	(Spain) Nikolás Sánchez Izquierdo (Spain) Jaume Pla Malfeito (Spain) Àlex Martínez (Spain) Benjamín Winter López
July 29	Xàtiva, Spain; Clay; M15; Singles and Doubles Draws	(Spain) Alberto Barroso Campos (Spain) Benjamín Winter López; 3–6, 7–6^{(7–3)}, [10–8]	(Spain) Imanol López Morillo (Spain) Pol Toledo Bagué	(Spain) Carlos López Montagud (Kazakhstan) Timofei Skatov	(Spain) Nikolás Sánchez Izquierdo (Spain) Jaume Pla Malfeito (Spain) Àlex Martínez (Spain) Benjamín Winter López
July 29	Tabarka, Tunisia; Clay; M15; Singles and Doubles Draws	(France) Matthieu Perchicot; 6–2, 3–6, 6–0	(Romania) Filip Cristian Jianu	(United Kingdom) Stuart Parker (Netherlands) Max Houkes	(France) Hugo Pontico (Netherlands) Bart Stevens (Argentina) Fermín Tenti (Italy) Luca Prevosto
July 29	Tabarka, Tunisia; Clay; M15; Singles and Doubles Draws	(Netherlands) Mats Hermans (Netherlands) Bart Stevens; 6–4, 6–0	(Jordan) Mousa Alkotop (Russia) Alexander Boborykin	(United Kingdom) Stuart Parker (Netherlands) Max Houkes	(France) Hugo Pontico (Netherlands) Bart Stevens (Argentina) Fermín Tenti (Italy) Luca Prevosto

=== August ===
Week of	Tournament	Winner	Runners-up	Semifinalists	Quarterfinalists
August 5	Vogau, Austria; Clay; M25; Singles and Doubles Draws	(Czech Republic) Jonáš Forejtek; 7–6^{(9–7)}, 4–6, 6–4	(Argentina) Camilo Ugo Carabelli	(Czech Republic) Vít Kopřiva (Spain) Nikolás Sánchez Izquierdo	(Slovakia) Lukáš Klein (France) Laurent Lokoli (Czech Republic) Jaroslav Pospíšil (Russia) Bogdan Bobrov
August 5	Vogau, Austria; Clay; M25; Singles and Doubles Draws	(Czech Republic) Jonáš Forejtek (Czech Republic) Jan Mertl; 6–4, 7–5	(Czech Republic) Vít Kopřiva (Czech Republic) Jaroslav Pospíšil	(Czech Republic) Vít Kopřiva (Spain) Nikolás Sánchez Izquierdo	(Slovakia) Lukáš Klein (France) Laurent Lokoli (Czech Republic) Jaroslav Pospíšil (Russia) Bogdan Bobrov
August 5	Portoviejo, Ecuador; Clay; M25; Singles and Doubles Draws	(Chile) Marcelo Tomás Barrios Vera; 6–2, 6–0	(Argentina) Juan Pablo Ficovich	(Peru) Mauricio Echazú (Colombia) Nicolás Mejía	(Brazil) Gabriel Ciro da Silva (Argentina) Fermín Tenti (Ecuador) Antonio Cayetano March (Peru) Jorge Panta
August 5	Portoviejo, Ecuador; Clay; M25; Singles and Doubles Draws	(Colombia) José Daniel Bendeck (Colombia) Nicolás Mejía; 6–7^{(4–7)}, 6–3, [10–7]	(Argentina) Juan Pablo Ficovich (Argentina) Agustín Riquelme Coppari	(Peru) Mauricio Echazú (Colombia) Nicolás Mejía	(Brazil) Gabriel Ciro da Silva (Argentina) Fermín Tenti (Ecuador) Antonio Cayetano March (Peru) Jorge Panta
August 5	Appiano, Italy; Clay; M25+H; Singles and Doubles Draws	(Sweden) Christian Lindell; 6–2, 4–6, 6–3	(Italy) Riccardo Balzerani	(Italy) Andrea Guerrieri (Italy) Pietro Rondoni	(France) Maxime Chazal (Italy) Davide Galoppini (Italy) Federico Arnaboldi (Italy) Francesco Forti
August 5	Appiano, Italy; Clay; M25+H; Singles and Doubles Draws	(Kazakhstan) Andrey Golubev (Brazil) Felipe Meligeni Alves; 6–4, 6–4	(Brazil) Daniel Dutra da Silva (Sweden) Christian Lindell	(Italy) Andrea Guerrieri (Italy) Pietro Rondoni	(France) Maxime Chazal (Italy) Davide Galoppini (Italy) Federico Arnaboldi (Italy) Francesco Forti
August 5	Pozoblanco, Spain; Hard; M25+H; Singles and Doubles Draws	(France) Rayane Roumane; 6–4, 7–5	(Russia) Konstantin Kravchuk	(Spain) Pablo Vivero González (Ukraine) Illya Marchenko	(France) Mick Lescure (Spain) Ricardo Ojeda Lara (Spain) Andrés Artuñedo (France) Gabriel Petit
August 5	Pozoblanco, Spain; Hard; M25+H; Singles and Doubles Draws	(Spain) Andrés Artuñedo (Spain) Sergio Martos Gornés; 7–6^{(7–4)}, 7–5	(France) Mick Lescure (Colombia) Eduardo Struvay	(Spain) Pablo Vivero González (Ukraine) Illya Marchenko	(France) Mick Lescure (Spain) Ricardo Ojeda Lara (Spain) Andrés Artuñedo (France) Gabriel Petit
August 5	Chiswick, United Kingdom; Hard; M25; Singles and Doubles Draws	(United Kingdom) Jack Draper; 6–4, 2–6, 6–3	(Netherlands) Igor Sijsling	(Austria) Jurij Rodionov (United Kingdom) Anton Matusevich	(Germany) Stefan Seifert (United Kingdom) Paul Jubb (Italy) Julian Ocleppo (France) Quentin Robert
August 5	Chiswick, United Kingdom; Hard; M25; Singles and Doubles Draws	(Republic of Ireland) Julian Bradley (United Kingdom) Ben Jones; 2–6, 6–2, [10–5]	(Italy) Julian Ocleppo (Italy) Francesco Vilardo	(Austria) Jurij Rodionov (United Kingdom) Anton Matusevich	(Germany) Stefan Seifert (United Kingdom) Paul Jubb (Italy) Julian Ocleppo (France) Quentin Robert
August 5	Edwardsville, United States; Hard; M25; Singles and Doubles Draws	(Cyprus) Petros Chrysochos; 6–4, 2–6, 7–5	(United States) Nathan Ponwith	(United States) Alexander Lebedev (United States) Ezekiel Clark	(United States) Jacob Dunbar (Argentina) Santiago Rodríguez Taverna (United States) Felix Corwin (United States) Kevin King
August 5	Edwardsville, United States; Hard; M25; Singles and Doubles Draws	(Italy) Liam Caruana (United States) Nathan Ponwith; 4–6, 6–4, [10–5]	(United States) George Goldhoff (United States) Alfredo Perez	(United States) Alexander Lebedev (United States) Ezekiel Clark	(United States) Jacob Dunbar (Argentina) Santiago Rodríguez Taverna (United States) Felix Corwin (United States) Kevin King
August 5	Eupen, Belgium; Clay; M15; Singles and Doubles Draws	(Argentina) Gonzalo Villanueva; 6–4, 6–1	(Belgium) Michael Geerts	(Russia) Denis Klok (Argentina) Genaro Alberto Olivieri	(Belgium) Benjamin D'Hoe (Belgium) Loïc Cloes (Dominican Republic) Nick Hardt (Netherlands) Daniel de Jonge
August 5	Eupen, Belgium; Clay; M15; Singles and Doubles Draws	(Belgium) Michael Geerts (Dominican Republic) Nick Hardt; 6–7^{(10–12)}, 6–2, [10–3]	(Argentina) Genaro Alberto Olivieri (Argentina) Gonzalo Villanueva	(Russia) Denis Klok (Argentina) Genaro Alberto Olivieri	(Belgium) Benjamin D'Hoe (Belgium) Loïc Cloes (Dominican Republic) Nick Hardt (Netherlands) Daniel de Jonge
August 5	Santa Cruz de la Sierra, Bolivia; Clay; M15; Singles and Doubles Draws	(Argentina) Juan Bautista Otegui; 6–4, 5–7, 7–5	(Colombia) Juan Sebastián Gómez	(Brazil) João Lucas Reis da Silva (Brazil) Alex Blumenberg	(Argentina) Maximiliano Estévez (Argentina) Gabriel Alejandro Hidalgo (Argentina) Tomás Farjat (Argentina) Mariano Navone
August 5	Santa Cruz de la Sierra, Bolivia; Clay; M15; Singles and Doubles Draws	(Bolivia) Boris Arias (Bolivia) Federico Zeballos; 7–5, 6–3	(Argentina) Maximiliano Estévez (Argentina) Gabriel Alejandro Hidalgo	(Brazil) João Lucas Reis da Silva (Brazil) Alex Blumenberg	(Argentina) Maximiliano Estévez (Argentina) Gabriel Alejandro Hidalgo (Argentina) Tomás Farjat (Argentina) Mariano Navone
August 5	Wetzlar, Germany; Clay; M15; Singles and Doubles Draws	(Germany) Mats Rosenkranz; 6–4, 6–3	(Brazil) Bruno Sant'Anna	(Germany) Lucas Gerch (Italy) Andrea Bolla	(France) Maxime Tchoutakian (France) Paul Cayre (Germany) Kai Wehnelt (Sweden) Jonathan Mridha
August 5	Wetzlar, Germany; Clay; M15; Singles and Doubles Draws	(Australia) James Frawley (Germany) Mats Rosenkranz; 2–6, 6–3, [12–10]	(Germany) Niklas Schell (Germany) Constantin Schmitz	(Germany) Lucas Gerch (Italy) Andrea Bolla	(France) Maxime Tchoutakian (France) Paul Cayre (Germany) Kai Wehnelt (Sweden) Jonathan Mridha
August 5	Jakarta, Indonesia; Hard; M15; Singles and Doubles Draws	(Ukraine) Vladyslav Orlov; 7–5, 4–6, 6–4	(Chinese Taipei) Lee Kuan-yi	(Japan) Takashi Saito (Italy) Emiliano Maggioli	(Japan) Soichiro Moritani (India) Manish Sureshkumar (Australia) Lucas Vuradin (United Kingdom) Jonathan Gray
August 5	Jakarta, Indonesia; Hard; M15; Singles and Doubles Draws	(Switzerland) Luca Castelnuovo (New Zealand) Rhett Purcell; 7–6^{(7–4)}, 6–4	(United States) Dusty Boyer (Hong Kong) Yeung Pak-long	(Japan) Takashi Saito (Italy) Emiliano Maggioli	(Japan) Soichiro Moritani (India) Manish Sureshkumar (Australia) Lucas Vuradin (United Kingdom) Jonathan Gray
August 5	Koszalin, Poland; Clay; M15; Singles and Doubles Draws	(Latvia) Mārtiņš Podžus; 6–3, 3–6, 6–4	(Czech Republic) David Poljak	(Russia) Ivan Nedelko (Poland) Michał Dembek	(Russia) Egor Noskin (Poland) Filip Kolasiński (Belarus) Aliaksandr Liaonenka (Poland) Daniel Michalski
August 5	Koszalin, Poland; Clay; M15; Singles and Doubles Draws	(Latvia) Jānis Podžus (Latvia) Mārtiņš Podžus; 7–6^{(9–7)}, 5–7, [10–5]	(Germany) Hasan Ibrahim (Germany) Timo Stodder	(Russia) Ivan Nedelko (Poland) Michał Dembek	(Russia) Egor Noskin (Poland) Filip Kolasiński (Belarus) Aliaksandr Liaonenka (Poland) Daniel Michalski
August 5	Târgu Mureș, Romania; Clay; M15; Singles and Doubles Draws	(Serbia) Marko Tepavac; 7–6^{(7–1)}, 6–2	(Argentina) Hernán Casanova	(Argentina) Facundo Juárez (Romania) Vasile Antonescu	(Romania) Cezar Crețu (Romania) Nicolae Frunză (Romania) Nicholas David Ionel (Romania) Ștefan Paloși
August 5	Târgu Mureș, Romania; Clay; M15; Singles and Doubles Draws	(Argentina) Hernán Casanova (Argentina) Facundo Juárez; 6–2, 7–6^{(7–4)}	(Bulgaria) Gabriel Donev (United States) Maksim Tikhomirov	(Argentina) Facundo Juárez (Romania) Vasile Antonescu	(Romania) Cezar Crețu (Romania) Nicolae Frunză (Romania) Nicholas David Ionel (Romania) Ștefan Paloși
August 5	Novi Sad, Serbia; Clay; M15; Singles and Doubles Draws	(Hungary) Péter Nagy; 7–6^{(7–4)}, 6–4	(Serbia) Marko Miladinović	(Czech Republic) Tadeáš Paroulek (Croatia) Duje Kekez	(Montenegro) Ljubomir Čelebić (Israel) Yshai Oliel (Russia) Matvey Khomentovskiy (Romania) Nini Gabriel Dica
August 5	Novi Sad, Serbia; Clay; M15; Singles and Doubles Draws	(Peru) Arklon Huertas del Pino (Peru) Conner Huertas del Pino; 6–3, 7–5	(Croatia) Domagoj Bilješko (China) Gao Qun	(Czech Republic) Tadeáš Paroulek (Croatia) Duje Kekez	(Montenegro) Ljubomir Čelebić (Israel) Yshai Oliel (Russia) Matvey Khomentovskiy (Romania) Nini Gabriel Dica
August 5	Ystad, Sweden; Clay; M15; Singles and Doubles Draws	(Sweden) Gustav Hansson; 7–6^{(7–5)}, 6–1	(Denmark) August Holmgren	(Argentina) Juan Manuel Cerúndolo (Finland) Patrik Niklas-Salminen	(Sweden) Markus Eriksson (Sweden) Robin Thour (Sweden) Simon Yitbarek (Sweden) Marius Ruzgas
August 5	Ystad, Sweden; Clay; M15; Singles and Doubles Draws	(Sweden) Karl Friberg (Sweden) Sam Taylor; 6–7^{(4–7)}, 7–5, [10–4]	(Sweden) Markus Eriksson (Sweden) Simon Freund	(Argentina) Juan Manuel Cerúndolo (Finland) Patrik Niklas-Salminen	(Sweden) Markus Eriksson (Sweden) Robin Thour (Sweden) Simon Yitbarek (Sweden) Marius Ruzgas
August 5	Tabarka, Tunisia; Clay; M15; Singles and Doubles Draws	(France) Corentin Denolly; 6–4, 6–3	(Italy) Daniele Capecchi	(France) Clément Tabur (Romania) Filip Cristian Jianu	(Argentina) Nicolás Alberto Arreche (Russia) Andrey Chepelev (Italy) Stefano Battaglino (Argentina) Franco Feitt
August 5	Tabarka, Tunisia; Clay; M15; Singles and Doubles Draws	(France) Corentin Denolly (France) Clément Tabur; 6–0, 6–1	(Argentina) Ignacio Carou (Argentina) Franco Feitt	(France) Clément Tabur (Romania) Filip Cristian Jianu	(Argentina) Nicolás Alberto Arreche (Russia) Andrey Chepelev (Italy) Stefano Battaglino (Argentina) Franco Feitt
August 12	Bydgoszcz, Poland; Clay; M25+H; Singles and Doubles Draws	(Peru) Nicolás Álvarez; 7–5, 6–3	(Poland) Daniel Michalski	(Poland) Jan Zieliński (Czech Republic) Jiří Lehečka	(Kazakhstan) Denis Yevseyev (Tunisia) Aziz Dougaz (Argentina) Genaro Alberto Olivieri (Argentina) Camilo Ugo Carabelli
August 12	Bydgoszcz, Poland; Clay; M25+H; Singles and Doubles Draws	(Ukraine) Vladyslav Manafov (Austria) David Pichler; 6–3, 6–4	(Australia) Adam Taylor (Australia) Jason Taylor	(Poland) Jan Zieliński (Czech Republic) Jiří Lehečka	(Kazakhstan) Denis Yevseyev (Tunisia) Aziz Dougaz (Argentina) Genaro Alberto Olivieri (Argentina) Camilo Ugo Carabelli
August 12	Pitești, Romania; Clay; M25; Singles and Doubles Draws	(Romania) Filip Cristian Jianu; 7–6^{(7–4)}, 5–0, ret.	(Serbia) Marko Tepavac	(Romania) Nicolae Frunză (Spain) Nikolás Sánchez Izquierdo	(France) Arthur Rinderknech (Romania) Călin Manda (France) Matthieu Perchicot (Romania) Dan Alexandru Tomescu
August 12	Pitești, Romania; Clay; M25; Singles and Doubles Draws	(Romania) Victor Vlad Cornea (Romania) Alexandru Jecan; 6–2, 6–2	(Romania) Vladimir Filip (Romania) Luca George Tatomir	(Romania) Nicolae Frunză (Spain) Nikolás Sánchez Izquierdo	(France) Arthur Rinderknech (Romania) Călin Manda (France) Matthieu Perchicot (Romania) Dan Alexandru Tomescu
August 12	Memphis, United States; Hard; M25; Singles and Doubles Draws	(Dominican Republic) Roberto Cid Subervi; 3–6, 6–3, 7–6^{(10–8)}	(United States) Ulises Blanch	(United States) Daniel Nguyen (United States) Alexander Sarkissian	(United States) Garrett Johns (United States) Kevin King (United States) Evan Song (United States) Austin Rapp
August 12	Memphis, United States; Hard; M25; Singles and Doubles Draws	(United States) Ian Dempster (United States) Korey Lovett; 6–2, 6–1	(United States) Harrison Adams (Moldova) Alexander Cozbinov	(United States) Daniel Nguyen (United States) Alexander Sarkissian	(United States) Garrett Johns (United States) Kevin King (United States) Evan Song (United States) Austin Rapp
August 12	Koksijde, Belgium; Clay; M15; Singles and Doubles Draws	(Sweden) Carl Söderlund; 6–4, 6–0	(Belgium) Gauthier Onclin	(Belgium) Romain Barbosa (Belgium) Clément Geens	(Belgium) Simon Beaupain (Sweden) Karl Friberg (Republic of Ireland) Simon Carr (Belgium) Zizou Bergs
August 12	Koksijde, Belgium; Clay; M15; Singles and Doubles Draws	(France) Dan Added (Belgium) Zizou Bergs; 6–4, 3–6, [10–3]	(Belgium) Romain Barbosa (Belgium) Arnaud Bovy	(Belgium) Romain Barbosa (Belgium) Clément Geens	(Belgium) Simon Beaupain (Sweden) Karl Friberg (Republic of Ireland) Simon Carr (Belgium) Zizou Bergs
August 12	La Paz, Bolivia; Clay; M15; Singles and Doubles Draws	(Colombia) Juan Sebastián Gómez; 7–6^{(7–2)}, 6–4	(Brazil) João Hinsching	(Argentina) Maximiliano Estévez (Argentina) Octavio Volpi	(Ecuador) Antonio Cayetano March (Peru) Jorge Panta (Brazil) Alex Blumenberg (Bolivia) Boris Arias
August 12	La Paz, Bolivia; Clay; M15; Singles and Doubles Draws	(Bolivia) Boris Arias (Bolivia) Federico Zeballos; 6–2, 4–6, [12–10]	(Brazil) João Hinsching (Colombia) Andrés Urrea	(Argentina) Maximiliano Estévez (Argentina) Octavio Volpi	(Ecuador) Antonio Cayetano March (Peru) Jorge Panta (Brazil) Alex Blumenberg (Bolivia) Boris Arias
August 12	Trier, Germany; Clay; M15; Singles and Doubles Draws	(Germany) Adrian Obert; 6–4, 6–3	(Germany) Constantin Schmitz	(Germany) Milan Welte (Germany) Dominik Böhler	(Italy) Fabrizio Ornago (Germany) Maik Steiner (Germany) Marlon Vankan (Germany) Niklas Schell
August 12	Trier, Germany; Clay; M15; Singles and Doubles Draws	(Germany) Niklas Schell (Germany) Constantin Schmitz; 6–4, 6–7^{(6–8)}, [10–7]	(Germany) Luca Gelhardt (Germany) Kai Wehnelt	(Germany) Milan Welte (Germany) Dominik Böhler	(Italy) Fabrizio Ornago (Germany) Maik Steiner (Germany) Marlon Vankan (Germany) Niklas Schell
August 12	Baja, Hungary; Clay; M15; Singles and Doubles Draws	(Hungary) Máté Valkusz; 6–4, 4–6, 6–2	(Argentina) Juan Manuel Cerúndolo	(France) Corentin Denolly (North Macedonia) Gorazd Srbljak	(Serbia) Boris Butulija (Czech Republic) Filip Duda (Czech Republic) Daniel Pátý (Czech Republic) Ondřej Krstev
August 12	Baja, Hungary; Clay; M15; Singles and Doubles Draws	(Czech Republic) Petr Hájek (Czech Republic) Ondřej Krstev; 7–6^{(7–5)}, 6–3	(Argentina) Juan Manuel Cerúndolo (Argentina) Francisco Comesaña	(France) Corentin Denolly (North Macedonia) Gorazd Srbljak	(Serbia) Boris Butulija (Czech Republic) Filip Duda (Czech Republic) Daniel Pátý (Czech Republic) Ondřej Krstev
August 12	Jakarta, Indonesia; Hard; M15; Singles and Doubles Draws	(Japan) Sho Shimabukuro; 7–6^{(7–3)}, 6–2	(South Africa) Ruan Roelofse	(Australia) Dayne Kelly (India) Aryan Goveas	(Australia) Matthew Romios (India) Niki Kaliyanda Poonacha (Thailand) Kasidit Samrej (New Zealand) Ajeet Rai
August 12	Jakarta, Indonesia; Hard; M15; Singles and Doubles Draws	(Indonesia) Justin Barki (South Africa) Ruan Roelofse; 7–6^{(7–3)}, 6–4	(Japan) Hiroyasu Ehara (Japan) Sho Shimabukuro	(Australia) Dayne Kelly (India) Aryan Goveas	(Australia) Matthew Romios (India) Niki Kaliyanda Poonacha (Thailand) Kasidit Samrej (New Zealand) Ajeet Rai
August 12	Santa Cristina Gherdëina, Italy; Clay; M15; Singles and Doubles Draws	(Argentina) Facundo Díaz Acosta; 6–7^{(7–9)}, 6–1, 6–2	(Brazil) Wilson Leite	(Netherlands) Mick Veldheer (Italy) Marco Bortolotti	(Italy) Pietro Rondoni (United Kingdom) Toby Martin (Italy) Federico Campana (Italy) Gian Marco Ortenzi
August 12	Santa Cristina Gherdëina, Italy; Clay; M15; Singles and Doubles Draws	(Italy) Marco Bortolotti (Brazil) Wilson Leite; 6–3, 6–4	(Italy) Alessandro Coppini (Italy) Augusto Virgili	(Netherlands) Mick Veldheer (Italy) Marco Bortolotti	(Italy) Pietro Rondoni (United Kingdom) Toby Martin (Italy) Federico Campana (Italy) Gian Marco Ortenzi
August 12	Cancún, Mexico; Hard; M15; Singles and Doubles Draws	(United States) Gage Brymer; 6–2, 6–4	(Venezuela) Ricardo Rodríguez	(United States) Logan Smith (France) Ronan Joncour	(United States) Jacob Brumm (Argentina) Thiago Agustín Tirante (France) Jaimee Floyd Angele (United States) Adam El Mihdawy
August 12	Cancún, Mexico; Hard; M15; Singles and Doubles Draws	(Japan) Shintaro Mochizuki (Argentina) Thiago Agustín Tirante; 6–7^{(4–7)}, 7–5, [10–4]	(United Kingdom) Isaac Stoute (Australia) Brandon Walkin	(United States) Logan Smith (France) Ronan Joncour	(United States) Jacob Brumm (Argentina) Thiago Agustín Tirante (France) Jaimee Floyd Angele (United States) Adam El Mihdawy
August 12	Oldenzaal, Netherlands; Clay; M15; Singles and Doubles Draws	(Netherlands) Jesper de Jong; 6–0, 6–4	(Netherlands) Amadatus Admiraal	(Netherlands) Bart Stevens (Netherlands) Ryan Nijboer	(Netherlands) Zachary Eisinga (Netherlands) Michiel de Krom (Germany) Sebastian Prechtel (Netherlands) Colin van Beem
August 12	Oldenzaal, Netherlands; Clay; M15; Singles and Doubles Draws	(Netherlands) Mats Hermans (Netherlands) Bart Stevens; 4–6, 6–4, [10–6]	(Germany) Alexander Mannapov (Ukraine) Vitalii Shcherba	(Netherlands) Bart Stevens (Netherlands) Ryan Nijboer	(Netherlands) Zachary Eisinga (Netherlands) Michiel de Krom (Germany) Sebastian Prechtel (Netherlands) Colin van Beem
August 12	Sintra, Portugal; Hard; M15; Singles and Doubles Draws	(France) Lucas Poullain; 7–6^{(7–4)}, 4–6, 6–1	(Portugal) Fred Gil	(Portugal) Tiago Cação (Spain) Pablo Vivero González	(France) Maxime Tchoutakian (Republic of Ireland) Peter Bothwell (Portugal) Nuno Borges (Portugal) Luís Faria
August 12	Sintra, Portugal; Hard; M15; Singles and Doubles Draws	(Republic of Ireland) Peter Bothwell (France) Maxime Tchoutakian; 6–3, 6–2	(United Kingdom) Stuart Parker (Lithuania) Julius Tverijonas	(Portugal) Tiago Cação (Spain) Pablo Vivero González	(France) Maxime Tchoutakian (Republic of Ireland) Peter Bothwell (Portugal) Nuno Borges (Portugal) Luís Faria
August 12	Moscow, Russia; Clay; M15; Singles and Doubles Draws	(Russia) Alexey Zakharov; 4–6, 7–5, 6–1	(Russia) Alen Avidzba	(Uzbekistan) Jurabek Karimov (Russia) Matvey Minin	(Russia) Konstantin Kravchuk (Russia) Kristian Lozan (Russia) Alexander Zhurbin (Russia) Bogdan Bobrov
August 12	Moscow, Russia; Clay; M15; Singles and Doubles Draws	(Russia) Alen Avidzba (Russia) Ivan Davydov; 3–6, 6–1, [10–7]	(Uzbekistan) Sergey Fomin (Greece) Markos Kalovelonis	(Uzbekistan) Jurabek Karimov (Russia) Matvey Minin	(Russia) Konstantin Kravchuk (Russia) Kristian Lozan (Russia) Alexander Zhurbin (Russia) Bogdan Bobrov
August 12	Novi Sad, Serbia; Clay; M15; Singles and Doubles Draws	(Serbia) Marko Miladinović; 2–6, 6–1, 6–2	(Israel) Yshai Oliel	(Russia) Dimitriy Voronin (France) Quentin Folliot	(Italy) Alessandro Petrone (China) Hua Runhao (Germany) Elmar Ejupovic (Peru) Arklon Huertas del Pino
August 12	Novi Sad, Serbia; Clay; M15; Singles and Doubles Draws	(Peru) Arklon Huertas del Pino (Peru) Conner Huertas del Pino; 6–2, 6–3	(Hungary) Péter Nagy (China) Shen Ao	(Russia) Dimitriy Voronin (France) Quentin Folliot	(Italy) Alessandro Petrone (China) Hua Runhao (Germany) Elmar Ejupovic (Peru) Arklon Huertas del Pino
August 12	Vigo, Spain; Clay; M15; Singles and Doubles Draws	(Brazil) Oscar José Gutierrez; 7–6^{(7–2)}, 7–6^{(7–0)}	(China) Te Rigele	(Spain) Pedro Vives Marcos (France) Arthur Reymond	(Spain) Pol Toledo Bagué (Spain) Benjamín Winter López (Spain) Sergi Pérez Contri (Spain) José Joaquín Miranda Cisneros
August 12	Vigo, Spain; Clay; M15; Singles and Doubles Draws	(Brazil) Oscar José Gutierrez (Brazil) Rafael Matos; 7–5, 6–2	(China) Gao Xin (China) Wang Aoran	(Spain) Pedro Vives Marcos (France) Arthur Reymond	(Spain) Pol Toledo Bagué (Spain) Benjamín Winter López (Spain) Sergi Pérez Contri (Spain) José Joaquín Miranda Cisneros
August 12	Tabarka, Tunisia; Clay; M15; Singles and Doubles Draws	(Italy) Daniele Capecchi; 6–1, 7–5	(Italy) Lorenzo Bocchi	(Italy) Giacomo Dambrosi (France) Mathys Erhard	(Germany) Karlo Cubelic (Turkey) Yankı Erel (Italy) Luca Prevosto (Russia) Andrey Chepelev
August 12	Tabarka, Tunisia; Clay; M15; Singles and Doubles Draws	(Argentina) Nicolás Alberto Arreche (Argentina) Franco Feitt; 6–4, 6–4	(Russia) Yan Bondarevskiy (Tunisia) Anis Ghorbel	(Italy) Giacomo Dambrosi (France) Mathys Erhard	(Germany) Karlo Cubelic (Turkey) Yankı Erel (Italy) Luca Prevosto (Russia) Andrey Chepelev
August 12	Irpin, Ukraine; Clay; M15; Singles and Doubles Draws	(Ukraine) Vladyslav Orlov; 6–3, 6–1	(Ukraine) Nikita Mashtakov	(Ukraine) Artem Smirnov (United States) Dennis Uspensky	(Ukraine) Oleksii Krutykh (Canada) David Volfson (Kazakhstan) Grigoriy Lomakin (Ukraine) Oleksandr Ovcharenko
August 12	Irpin, Ukraine; Clay; M15; Singles and Doubles Draws	(Ukraine) Vladyslav Orlov (Georgia (country)) George Tsivadze; 1–6, 6–3, [10–5]	(Kazakhstan) Sagadat Ayap (Bulgaria) Vasko Mladenov	(Ukraine) Artem Smirnov (United States) Dennis Uspensky	(Ukraine) Oleksii Krutykh (Canada) David Volfson (Kazakhstan) Grigoriy Lomakin (Ukraine) Oleksandr Ovcharenko
August 19	Poznań, Poland; Clay; M25; Singles and Doubles Draws	(Czech Republic) Václav Šafránek; 6–3, 6–2	(Ecuador) Diego Hidalgo	(Argentina) Camilo Ugo Carabelli (Argentina) Agustín Velotti	(Kazakhstan) Denis Yevseyev (Serbia) Miljan Zekić (Peru) Nicolás Álvarez (Sweden) Jonathan Mridha
August 19	Poznań, Poland; Clay; M25; Singles and Doubles Draws	(Poland) Mateusz Kowalczyk (Poland) Piotr Matuszewski; 6–3, 6–4	(Ecuador) Diego Hidalgo (Brazil) Pedro Sakamoto	(Argentina) Camilo Ugo Carabelli (Argentina) Agustín Velotti	(Kazakhstan) Denis Yevseyev (Serbia) Miljan Zekić (Peru) Nicolás Álvarez (Sweden) Jonathan Mridha
August 19	Santander, Spain; Clay; M25; Singles and Doubles Draws	(Brazil) Oscar José Gutierrez; 6–4, 6–1	(Brazil) Orlando Luz	(Spain) Imanol López Morillo (Spain) Eduard Esteve Lobato	(Kazakhstan) Timofei Skatov (Brazil) Daniel Dutra da Silva (Russia) Ivan Gakhov (Switzerland) Johan Nikles
August 19	Santander, Spain; Clay; M25; Singles and Doubles Draws	(Brazil) Orlando Luz (Brazil) Rafael Matos; 7–5, 6–4	(Russia) Ivan Gakhov (Spain) Jaume Pla Malfeito	(Spain) Imanol López Morillo (Spain) Eduard Esteve Lobato	(Kazakhstan) Timofei Skatov (Brazil) Daniel Dutra da Silva (Russia) Ivan Gakhov (Switzerland) Johan Nikles
August 19	Schlieren, Switzerland; Clay; M25; Singles and Doubles Draws	(Germany) Daniel Masur; 6–4, 6–2	(France) Benjamin Bonzi	(Switzerland) Sandro Ehrat (Lithuania) Laurynas Grigelis	(Switzerland) Jakub Paul (Italy) Julian Ocleppo (Russia) Ronald Slobodchikov (Switzerland) Mirko Martinez
August 19	Schlieren, Switzerland; Clay; M25; Singles and Doubles Draws	(Czech Republic) Petr Nouza (Czech Republic) David Škoch; 7–5, 6–3	(United States) Hunter Johnson (United States) Yates Johnson	(Switzerland) Sandro Ehrat (Lithuania) Laurynas Grigelis	(Switzerland) Jakub Paul (Italy) Julian Ocleppo (Russia) Ronald Slobodchikov (Switzerland) Mirko Martinez
August 19	Minsk, Belarus; Hard; M15; Singles and Doubles Draws	(Russia) Artem Dubrivnyy; 6–3, 7–6^{(7–5)}	(Belarus) Ivan Liutarevich	(Ukraine) Vadym Ursu (Canada) David Volfson	(Belarus) Alexander Zgirovsky (Czech Republic) David Poljak (Czech Republic) Ondřej Krstev (Czech Republic) Michal Konečný
August 19	Minsk, Belarus; Hard; M15; Singles and Doubles Draws	(Russia) Artem Dubrivnyy (Czech Republic) David Poljak; 6–2, 6–2	(Kazakhstan) Sagadat Ayap (Georgia (country)) George Tsivadze	(Ukraine) Vadym Ursu (Canada) David Volfson	(Belarus) Alexander Zgirovsky (Czech Republic) David Poljak (Czech Republic) Ondřej Krstev (Czech Republic) Michal Konečný
August 19	Lambermont, Belgium; Clay; M15; Singles and Doubles Draws	(France) Dan Added; 4–6, 7–6^{(7–5)}, 7–5	(France) Matthieu Perchicot	(France) Gabriel Petit (Belgium) Arnaud Bovy	(Germany) Constantin Schmitz (Belgium) Clément Geens (Argentina) Alejo Vilaro (Belgium) Simon Beaupain
August 19	Lambermont, Belgium; Clay; M15; Singles and Doubles Draws	(Netherlands) Max Houkes (Netherlands) Colin van Beem; 7–5, 6–3	(France) Dan Added (Belgium) Arnaud Bovy	(France) Gabriel Petit (Belgium) Arnaud Bovy	(Germany) Constantin Schmitz (Belgium) Clément Geens (Argentina) Alejo Vilaro (Belgium) Simon Beaupain
August 19	Helsinki, Finland; Clay; M15; Singles and Doubles Draws	(Argentina) Juan Manuel Cerúndolo; 6–2, 6–3	(Finland) Patrik Niklas-Salminen	(France) Corentin Denolly (Spain) José Francisco Vidal Azorín	(Italy) Alexander Weis (Argentina) Francisco Comesaña (Sweden) Karl Friberg (Estonia) Vladimir Ivanov
August 19	Helsinki, Finland; Clay; M15; Singles and Doubles Draws	(Poland) Daniel Kossek (Poland) Maciej Smoła; 6–4, 6–2	(Estonia) Vladimir Ivanov (Estonia) Kristjan Tamm	(France) Corentin Denolly (Spain) José Francisco Vidal Azorín	(Italy) Alexander Weis (Argentina) Francisco Comesaña (Sweden) Karl Friberg (Estonia) Vladimir Ivanov
August 19	Überlingen, Germany; Clay; M15; Singles and Doubles Draws	(Germany) Peter Heller; 6–1, 6–4	(Germany) Louis Wessels	(Brazil) Bruno Sant'Anna (Germany) Kai Wehnelt	(Netherlands) Mick Veldheer (Germany) Lukas Ollert (Austria) Jonas Trinker (Argentina) Juan Ignacio Galarza
August 19	Überlingen, Germany; Clay; M15; Singles and Doubles Draws	(Germany) Valentin Günther (Germany) Louis Wessels; 6–3, 6–3	(Netherlands) Mick Veldheer (Germany) Leopold Zima	(Brazil) Bruno Sant'Anna (Germany) Kai Wehnelt	(Netherlands) Mick Veldheer (Germany) Lukas Ollert (Austria) Jonas Trinker (Argentina) Juan Ignacio Galarza
August 19	Jakarta, Indonesia; Hard; M15; Singles and Doubles Draws	(Japan) Jumpei Yamasaki; 6–3, 6–1	(United States) Dusty Boyer	(Japan) Renta Tokuda (New Zealand) Rhett Purcell	(India) Haadin Bava (Australia) Alexander Crnokrak (Switzerland) Aaron Schmid (Japan) Kosuke Ogura
August 19	Jakarta, Indonesia; Hard; M15; Singles and Doubles Draws	(Japan) Hiroyasu Ehara (Japan) Sho Shimabukuro; 6–1, 6–2	(United Kingdom) Jonathan Gray (Japan) Jumpei Yamasaki	(Japan) Renta Tokuda (New Zealand) Rhett Purcell	(India) Haadin Bava (Australia) Alexander Crnokrak (Switzerland) Aaron Schmid (Japan) Kosuke Ogura
August 19	Kiryat Shmona, Israel; Hard; M15; Singles and Doubles Draws	(Italy) Alessandro Bega; 6–2, 1–6, 6–4	(Ukraine) Marat Deviatiarov	(Italy) Francesco Vilardo (Turkey) Marsel İlhan	(Switzerland) Riccardo Maiga (Israel) Alexander Gaponenko (Italy) Giorgio Ricca (Israel) Yasha Zemel
August 19	Kiryat Shmona, Israel; Hard; M15; Singles and Doubles Draws	(Italy) Federico Bertuccioli (Italy) Andrea Picchione; 4–6, 6–4, [14–12]	(Ukraine) Marat Deviatiarov (Japan) Takuto Niki	(Italy) Francesco Vilardo (Turkey) Marsel İlhan	(Switzerland) Riccardo Maiga (Israel) Alexander Gaponenko (Italy) Giorgio Ricca (Israel) Yasha Zemel
August 19	Cancún, Mexico; Hard; M15; Singles and Doubles Draws	(France) Ronan Joncour; 3–6, 7–5, 6–1	(Argentina) Thiago Agustín Tirante	(Japan) Shintaro Mochizuki (United States) Nick Chappell	(Northern Mariana Islands) Colin Sinclair (Venezuela) Ricardo Rodríguez (Dominican Republic) José Olivares (United States) Mwendwa Mbithi
August 19	Cancún, Mexico; Hard; M15; Singles and Doubles Draws	(Honduras) Jaime Bendeck (United States) George Goldhoff; 3–6, 6–3, [11–9]	(United States) Mwendwa Mbithi (Jamaica) Rowland Phillips	(Japan) Shintaro Mochizuki (United States) Nick Chappell	(Northern Mariana Islands) Colin Sinclair (Venezuela) Ricardo Rodríguez (Dominican Republic) José Olivares (United States) Mwendwa Mbithi
August 19	Lambaré, Paraguay; Clay; M15; Singles and Doubles Draws	(Argentina) Gonzalo Villanueva; 6–1, 6–3	(Brazil) João Lucas Reis da Silva	(Argentina) Gabriel Alejandro Hidalgo (Peru) Mauricio Echazú	(Peru) Jorge Panta (Bolivia) Federico Zeballos (Argentina) Fermín Tenti (Brazil) André Miele
August 19	Lambaré, Paraguay; Clay; M15; Singles and Doubles Draws	(Bolivia) Boris Arias (Bolivia) Federico Zeballos; 7–5, 6–2	(Argentina) Maximiliano Estévez (Argentina) Gonzalo Villanueva	(Argentina) Gabriel Alejandro Hidalgo (Peru) Mauricio Echazú	(Peru) Jorge Panta (Bolivia) Federico Zeballos (Argentina) Fermín Tenti (Brazil) André Miele
August 19	Sintra, Portugal; Hard; M15; Singles and Doubles Draws	(France) Antoine Escoffier; 7–5, 6–4	(France) Lucas Poullain	(Portugal) Fred Gil (Belgium) Yannick Mertens	(Portugal) Francisco Cabral (France) Antoine Cornut-Chauvinc (Portugal) Tiago Cação (France) Kyrian Jacquet
August 19	Sintra, Portugal; Hard; M15; Singles and Doubles Draws	(France) Antoine Escoffier (France) Maxime Tchoutakian; 0–6, 6–2, [10–5]	(Republic of Ireland) Peter Bothwell (Brazil) Bernardo Oliveira	(Portugal) Fred Gil (Belgium) Yannick Mertens	(Portugal) Francisco Cabral (France) Antoine Cornut-Chauvinc (Portugal) Tiago Cação (France) Kyrian Jacquet
August 19	Curtea de Argeș, Romania; Clay; M15; Singles and Doubles Draws	(Romania) Alexandru Jecan; 3–6, 7–6^{(7–4)}, 6–3	(Argentina) Hernán Casanova	(Bulgaria) Alexandar Lazarov (Romania) Nicolae Frunză	(Bulgaria) Gabriel Donev (Italy) Simone Roncalli (Romania) Radu Mihai Papoe (Argentina) Facundo Juárez
August 19	Curtea de Argeș, Romania; Clay; M15; Singles and Doubles Draws	(Bulgaria) Alexandar Lazarov (Romania) Călin Manda; 6–4, 6–4	(Romania) Petru-Alexandru Luncanu (Romania) Ștefan Paloși	(Bulgaria) Alexandar Lazarov (Romania) Nicolae Frunză	(Bulgaria) Gabriel Donev (Italy) Simone Roncalli (Romania) Radu Mihai Papoe (Argentina) Facundo Juárez
August 19	Moscow, Russia; Clay; M15; Singles and Doubles Draws	(Russia) Alexander Zhurbin; 6–3, 6–1	(Uzbekistan) Sanjar Fayziev	(Russia) Konstantin Kravchuk (Estonia) Kenneth Raisma	(Estonia) Daniil Glinka (Belarus) Mikalai Haliak (Russia) Savriyan Danilov (Russia) Alen Avidzba
August 19	Moscow, Russia; Clay; M15; Singles and Doubles Draws	(Russia) Maxim Ratniuk (Russia) Alexander Shevchenko; 0–6, 7–6^{(7–3)}, [10–6]	(Russia) Anton Chekhov (Russia) Timur Kiyamov	(Russia) Konstantin Kravchuk (Estonia) Kenneth Raisma	(Estonia) Daniil Glinka (Belarus) Mikalai Haliak (Russia) Savriyan Danilov (Russia) Alen Avidzba
August 19	Hua Hin, Thailand; Hard; M15; Singles and Doubles Draws	(South Korea) Hong Seong-chan; 7–5, 6–3	(Australia) Dayne Kelly	(United Kingdom) Ryan Peniston (Australia) Bradley Mousley	(South Korea) Jeong Young-hoon (China) Wang Chukang (Chinese Taipei) Hsu Yu-hsiou (Chinese Taipei) Lee Kuan-yi
August 19	Hua Hin, Thailand; Hard; M15; Singles and Doubles Draws	(Thailand) Sanchai Ratiwatana (Thailand) Sonchat Ratiwatana; 6–2, 6–0	(Australia) Bradley Mousley (New Zealand) Ajeet Rai	(United Kingdom) Ryan Peniston (Australia) Bradley Mousley	(South Korea) Jeong Young-hoon (China) Wang Chukang (Chinese Taipei) Hsu Yu-hsiou (Chinese Taipei) Lee Kuan-yi
August 19	Tabarka, Tunisia; Clay; M15; Singles and Doubles Draws	(Argentina) Matías Zukas; 6–2, 3–6, 7–5	(Argentina) Tomás Martín Etcheverry	(Slovenia) Tomás Lipovšek Puches (Italy) Gregorio Lulli	(Italy) Gabriele Maria Noce (Italy) Federico Iannaccone (Russia) Andrey Chepelev (India) Rishab Agarwal
August 19	Tabarka, Tunisia; Clay; M15; Singles and Doubles Draws	(Argentina) Franco Feitt (Argentina) Guido Iván Justo; 6–4, 6–2	(Chile) Esteban Bruna (Argentina) Tomás Martín Etcheverry	(Slovenia) Tomás Lipovšek Puches (Italy) Gregorio Lulli	(Italy) Gabriele Maria Noce (Italy) Federico Iannaccone (Russia) Andrey Chepelev (India) Rishab Agarwal
August 26	Győr, Hungary; Clay; M25; Singles and Doubles Draws	(Dominican Republic) Roberto Cid Subervi; 6–1, 6–0	(Czech Republic) Vít Kopřiva	(Argentina) Camilo Ugo Carabelli (Austria) Lenny Hampel	(Ecuador) Diego Hidalgo (Serbia) Marko Miladinović (Croatia) Duje Ajduković (Argentina) Hernán Casanova
August 26	Győr, Hungary; Clay; M25; Singles and Doubles Draws	(Ecuador) Diego Hidalgo (Brazil) Pedro Sakamoto; 6–4, 6–1	(Croatia) Ivan Sabanov (Croatia) Matej Sabanov	(Argentina) Camilo Ugo Carabelli (Austria) Lenny Hampel	(Ecuador) Diego Hidalgo (Serbia) Marko Miladinović (Croatia) Duje Ajduković (Argentina) Hernán Casanova
August 26	Ust-Kamenogorsk, Kazakhstan; Hard; M25; Singles and Doubles Draws	(Israel) Edan Leshem; 2–2, ret.	(Russia) Konstantin Kravchuk	(Russia) Bogdan Bobrov (Russia) Alexey Zakharov	(Russia) Bekkhan Atlangeriev (Russia) Maxim Ratniuk (Kazakhstan) Timur Khabibulin (Kazakhstan) Grigoriy Lomakin
August 26	Ust-Kamenogorsk, Kazakhstan; Hard; M25; Singles and Doubles Draws	(Russia) Konstantin Kravchuk (Russia) Alexander Pavlioutchenkov; 7–5, 6–3	(Kazakhstan) Sagadat Ayap (Kazakhstan) Grigoriy Lomakin	(Russia) Bogdan Bobrov (Russia) Alexey Zakharov	(Russia) Bekkhan Atlangeriev (Russia) Maxim Ratniuk (Kazakhstan) Timur Khabibulin (Kazakhstan) Grigoriy Lomakin
August 26	San Sebastián, Spain; Clay; M25; Singles and Doubles Draws	(Spain) Javier Barranco Cosano; 7–5, 6–0	(Brazil) Oscar José Gutierrez	(Brazil) Orlando Luz (Brazil) Daniel Dutra da Silva	(Dominican Republic) José Hernández-Fernández (Peru) Nicolás Álvarez (Russia) Alexander Zhurbin (Brazil) Rafael Matos
August 26	San Sebastián, Spain; Clay; M25; Singles and Doubles Draws	(Spain) Eduard Esteve Lobato (Spain) Oriol Roca Batalla; 7–5, 4–6, [10–7]	(Spain) Javier Barranco Cosano (Dominican Republic) José Hernández-Fernández	(Brazil) Orlando Luz (Brazil) Daniel Dutra da Silva	(Dominican Republic) José Hernández-Fernández (Peru) Nicolás Álvarez (Russia) Alexander Zhurbin (Brazil) Rafael Matos
August 26	Irpin, Ukraine; Clay; M25; Singles and Doubles Draws	(Lithuania) Laurynas Grigelis; 6–0, 6–3	(Kazakhstan) Denis Yevseyev	(Brazil) Guilherme Clezar (Argentina) Juan Pablo Ficovich	(Brazil) Jordan Correia (Argentina) Genaro Alberto Olivieri (Ukraine) Vladyslav Orlov (Ukraine) Artem Smirnov
August 26	Irpin, Ukraine; Clay; M25; Singles and Doubles Draws	(Ukraine) Vladyslav Manafov (Kazakhstan) Denis Yevseyev; 7–6^{(7–5)}, 5–7, [10–6]	(Uzbekistan) Sergey Fomin (Uzbekistan) Jurabek Karimov	(Brazil) Guilherme Clezar (Argentina) Juan Pablo Ficovich	(Brazil) Jordan Correia (Argentina) Genaro Alberto Olivieri (Ukraine) Vladyslav Orlov (Ukraine) Artem Smirnov
August 26	Kiryat Shmona, Israel; Hard; M15; Singles and Doubles Draws	(Israel) Yshai Oliel; 6–3, 5–7, 6–4	(United Kingdom) Jack Draper	(Switzerland) Riccardo Maiga (United Kingdom) Aidan McHugh	(Israel) Alon Elia (Japan) Takuto Niki (Russia) Kristian Lozan (Turkey) Marsel İlhan
August 26	Kiryat Shmona, Israel; Hard; M15; Singles and Doubles Draws	(United States) Samuel Beren (Canada) Raheel Manji; 6–4, 2–6, [10–6]	(United Kingdom) Jack Draper (United Kingdom) Aidan McHugh	(Switzerland) Riccardo Maiga (United Kingdom) Aidan McHugh	(Israel) Alon Elia (Japan) Takuto Niki (Russia) Kristian Lozan (Turkey) Marsel İlhan
August 26	Piombino, Italy; Hard; M15; Singles and Doubles Draws	(France) Matteo Martineau; 2–6, 7–6^{(8–6)}, 7–6^{(7–3)}	(France) Hugo Gaston	(United Kingdom) Anton Matusevich (Spain) Pablo Vivero González	(Italy) Walter Trusendi (Belgium) Yannick Mertens (France) Antoine Escoffier (Bosnia and Herzegovina) Nerman Fatić
August 26	Piombino, Italy; Hard; M15; Singles and Doubles Draws	(Spain) David Jordà Sanchis (Spain) Pablo Vivero González; 6–4, 6–4	(United Kingdom) Luke Johnson (United Kingdom) Ben Jones	(United Kingdom) Anton Matusevich (Spain) Pablo Vivero González	(Italy) Walter Trusendi (Belgium) Yannick Mertens (France) Antoine Escoffier (Bosnia and Herzegovina) Nerman Fatić
August 26	Cancún, Mexico; Hard; M15; Singles and Doubles Draws	(Croatia) Matija Pecotić; 6–3, 6–3	(United States) Christian Langmo	(Bolivia) Federico Zeballos (United States) Gage Brymer	(France) Ronan Joncour (Dominican Republic) José Olivares (United States) Nick Chappell (France) Jean Thirouin
August 26	Cancún, Mexico; Hard; M15; Singles and Doubles Draws	(United States) George Goldhoff (United States) Tanner Smith; 6–0, 7–6^{(8–6)}	(Bolivia) Boris Arias (Bolivia) Federico Zeballos	(Bolivia) Federico Zeballos (United States) Gage Brymer	(France) Ronan Joncour (Dominican Republic) José Olivares (United States) Nick Chappell (France) Jean Thirouin
August 26	Haren, Netherlands; Clay; M15; Singles and Doubles Draws	(Netherlands) Jesper de Jong; 7–5, 6–0	(Argentina) Juan Ignacio Galarza	(Germany) Marvin Netuschil (Netherlands) Zachary Eisinga	(Georgia (country)) Aleksandre Metreveli (Austria) David Pichler (Germany) Stefan Seifert (Netherlands) Ryan Nijboer
August 26	Haren, Netherlands; Clay; M15; Singles and Doubles Draws	(Netherlands) Mats Hermans (Netherlands) Bart Stevens; 6–3, 6–2	(Germany) Lasse Muscheites (Germany) Stefan Seifert	(Germany) Marvin Netuschil (Netherlands) Zachary Eisinga	(Georgia (country)) Aleksandre Metreveli (Austria) David Pichler (Germany) Stefan Seifert (Netherlands) Ryan Nijboer
August 26	Bratislava, Slovakia; Clay; M15; Singles and Doubles Draws	(Slovakia) Lukáš Klein; 7–6^{(7–3)}, 6–3	(Russia) Kirill Kivattsev	(Italy) Giovanni Fonio (Czech Republic) Tomáš Jiroušek	(Austria) Jakob Aichhorn (Russia) Dimitriy Voronin (Slovenia) Tom Kočevar-Dešman (Poland) Maciej Rajski
August 26	Bratislava, Slovakia; Clay; M15; Singles and Doubles Draws	(Poland) Maciej Rajski (Poland) Yann Wójcik; 7–6^{(7–4)}, 7–6^{(7–4)}	(Romania) Adrian Barbu (Ukraine) Vitalii Shcherba	(Italy) Giovanni Fonio (Czech Republic) Tomáš Jiroušek	(Austria) Jakob Aichhorn (Russia) Dimitriy Voronin (Slovenia) Tom Kočevar-Dešman (Poland) Maciej Rajski
August 26	Horgen, Switzerland; Clay; M15; Singles and Doubles Draws	(Germany) Louis Wessels; 6–2, 6–0	(Colombia) Alejandro González	(Switzerland) Luca Stäheli (Switzerland) Damien Wenger	(Netherlands) Mick Veldheer (Germany) Paul Wörner (Switzerland) Jakub Paul (Germany) Valentin Günther
August 26	Horgen, Switzerland; Clay; M15; Singles and Doubles Draws	(Switzerland) Raphael Baltensperger (Switzerland) Antoine Bellier; 6–4, 6–2	(Switzerland) Luca Stäheli (Switzerland) Damien Wenger	(Switzerland) Luca Stäheli (Switzerland) Damien Wenger	(Netherlands) Mick Veldheer (Germany) Paul Wörner (Switzerland) Jakub Paul (Germany) Valentin Günther
August 26	Hua Hin, Thailand; Hard; M15; Singles and Doubles Draws	(Chinese Taipei) Hsu Yu-hsiou; 6–3, 6–3	(United Kingdom) Ryan Peniston	(South Korea) Hong Seong-chan (Japan) Takashi Saito	(Japan) Hiroyasu Ehara (China) Li Yuanfeng (Switzerland) Aaron Schmid (Australia) Dayne Kelly
August 26	Hua Hin, Thailand; Hard; M15; Singles and Doubles Draws	(South Korea) Hong Seong-chan (South Korea) Shin San-hui; 6–4, 6–4	(Chinese Taipei) Hsu Yu-hsiou (Chinese Taipei) Lin Wei-de	(South Korea) Hong Seong-chan (Japan) Takashi Saito	(Japan) Hiroyasu Ehara (China) Li Yuanfeng (Switzerland) Aaron Schmid (Australia) Dayne Kelly
August 26	Tabarka, Tunisia; Clay; M15; Singles and Doubles Draws	(Argentina) Tomás Martín Etcheverry; 6–1, 6–1	(Italy) Lorenzo Bocchi	(Spain) Imanol López Morillo (Slovenia) Tomás Lipovšek Puches	(Argentina) Matías Zukas (Argentina) Sebastián Báez (Russia) Andrey Chepelev (Tunisia) Aziz Ouakaa
August 26	Tabarka, Tunisia; Clay; M15; Singles and Doubles Draws	(Tunisia) Anis Ghorbel (Tunisia) Majed Kilani; 6–4, 6–4	(Argentina) Franco Feitt (Argentina) Guido Iván Justo	(Spain) Imanol López Morillo (Slovenia) Tomás Lipovšek Puches	(Argentina) Matías Zukas (Argentina) Sebastián Báez (Russia) Andrey Chepelev (Tunisia) Aziz Ouakaa

=== September ===
Week of	Tournament	Winner	Runners-up	Semifinalists	Quarterfinalists
September 2	Bagnères-de-Bigorre, France; Hard; M25; Singles and Doubles Draws	(Colombia) Eduardo Struvay; 6–4, 6–4	(United Kingdom) Evan Hoyt	(France) Tom Jomby (Belgium) Yannick Mertens	(Israel) Edan Leshem (France) Antoine Cornut-Chauvinc (Germany) Hendrik Jebens (France) Arthur Reymond
September 2	Bagnères-de-Bigorre, France; Hard; M25; Singles and Doubles Draws	(France) Jonathan Eysseric (France) Tom Jomby; 6–1, 3–6, [10–3]	(Israel) Edan Leshem (France) Albano Olivetti	(France) Tom Jomby (Belgium) Yannick Mertens	(Israel) Edan Leshem (France) Antoine Cornut-Chauvinc (Germany) Hendrik Jebens (France) Arthur Reymond
September 2	Trieste, Italy; Clay; M25; Singles and Doubles Draws	(Peru) Juan Pablo Varillas; 6–7^{(6–8)}, 6–1, 6–4	(Austria) Alexander Erler	(Chile) Marcelo Tomás Barrios Vera (Slovenia) Tom Kočevar-Dešman	(Sweden) Christian Lindell (France) Sadio Doumbia (Italy) Davide Galoppini (Switzerland) Sandro Ehrat
September 2	Trieste, Italy; Clay; M25; Singles and Doubles Draws	(France) Sadio Doumbia (France) Fabien Reboul; 6–3, 6–2	(Italy) Davide Galoppini (Italy) Pietro Rondoni	(Chile) Marcelo Tomás Barrios Vera (Slovenia) Tom Kočevar-Dešman	(Sweden) Christian Lindell (France) Sadio Doumbia (Italy) Davide Galoppini (Switzerland) Sandro Ehrat
September 2	Oviedo, Spain; Clay; M25; Singles and Doubles Draws	(Spain) Oriol Roca Batalla; 6–4, 6–4	(Dominican Republic) José Hernández-Fernández	(Brazil) Orlando Luz (Dominican Republic) Roberto Cid Subervi	(Spain) Sergio Martos Gornés (Peru) Nicolás Álvarez (Ecuador) Diego Hidalgo (Spain) Íñigo Cervantes
September 2	Oviedo, Spain; Clay; M25; Singles and Doubles Draws	(Brazil) Daniel Dutra da Silva (Brazil) Pedro Sakamoto; 6–7^{(3–7)}, 7–6^{(7–4)}, [10–5]	(Peru) Nicolás Álvarez (Argentina) Juan Pablo Ficovich	(Brazil) Orlando Luz (Dominican Republic) Roberto Cid Subervi	(Spain) Sergio Martos Gornés (Peru) Nicolás Álvarez (Ecuador) Diego Hidalgo (Spain) Íñigo Cervantes
September 2	La Marsa, Tunisia; Clay; M25; Singles and Doubles Draws	(Brazil) Bruno Sant'Anna; 7–5, 6–4	(Germany) Louis Wessels	(Brazil) Guilherme Clezar (Italy) Marco Bortolotti	(France) Manuel Guinard (Serbia) Arsenije Zlatanović (Tunisia) Skander Mansouri (Germany) Jeremy Jahn
September 2	La Marsa, Tunisia; Clay; M25; Singles and Doubles Draws	(Tunisia) Aziz Dougaz (Tunisia) Skander Mansouri; 6–2, 4–6, [10–8]	(Tunisia) Moez Echargui (France) Thomas Setodji	(Brazil) Guilherme Clezar (Italy) Marco Bortolotti	(France) Manuel Guinard (Serbia) Arsenije Zlatanović (Tunisia) Skander Mansouri (Germany) Jeremy Jahn
September 2	Székesfehérvár, Hungary; Clay; M15; Singles and Doubles Draws	(Czech Republic) Michael Vrbenský; 6–2, 6–2	(Croatia) Duje Ajduković	(Czech Republic) Pavel Nejedlý (Russia) Kirill Kivattsev	(Austria) David Pichler (Hungary) Fábián Marozsán (Argentina) Genaro Alberto Olivieri (Ukraine) Georgii Kravchenko
September 2	Székesfehérvár, Hungary; Clay; M15; Singles and Doubles Draws	(Czech Republic) Petr Nouza (Czech Republic) Michael Vrbenský; 5–7, 6–1, [17–15]	(Ukraine) Danylo Kalenichenko (Austria) David Pichler	(Czech Republic) Pavel Nejedlý (Russia) Kirill Kivattsev	(Austria) David Pichler (Hungary) Fábián Marozsán (Argentina) Genaro Alberto Olivieri (Ukraine) Georgii Kravchenko
September 2	Sajur, Israel; Hard; M15; Singles and Doubles Draws	(Israel) Yshai Oliel; 6–1, 7–6^{(8–6)}	(Italy) Giorgio Ricca	(United Kingdom) Jack Draper (Israel) Yair Sarouk	(Russia) Yan Sabanin (Poland) Piotr Grynkowski (United Kingdom) Alexis Canter (Israel) Alon Elia
September 2	Sajur, Israel; Hard; M15; Singles and Doubles Draws	(Russia) Timur Kiyamov (Russia) Yan Sabanin; 7–6^{(7–1)}, 6–7^{(4–7)}, [10–3]	(Switzerland) Riccardo Maiga (Italy) Giorgio Ricca	(United Kingdom) Jack Draper (Israel) Yair Sarouk	(Russia) Yan Sabanin (Poland) Piotr Grynkowski (United Kingdom) Alexis Canter (Israel) Alon Elia
September 2	São Brás de Alportel, Portugal; Hard; M15; Singles and Doubles Draws	(Portugal) Fred Gil; 6–4, 4–6, 6–1	(Sweden) Simon Freund	(United Kingdom) Luke Johnson (Lithuania) Julius Tverijonas	(Czech Republic) David Poljak (Portugal) Tiago Cação (United Kingdom) Anton Matusevich (Portugal) Luís Faria
September 2	São Brás de Alportel, Portugal; Hard; M15; Singles and Doubles Draws	(Sweden) Simon Freund (United States) Nicolas Moreno de Alboran; 5–7, 6–4, [10–7]	(Portugal) Francisco Cabral (United Kingdom) Luke Johnson	(United Kingdom) Luke Johnson (Lithuania) Julius Tverijonas	(Czech Republic) David Poljak (Portugal) Tiago Cação (United Kingdom) Anton Matusevich (Portugal) Luís Faria
September 2	Hua Hin, Thailand; Hard; M15; Singles and Doubles Draws	(Japan) Makoto Ochi; 6–1, 7–6^{(7–5)}	(Australia) Dayne Kelly	(India) Sidharth Rawat (Japan) Yusuke Takahashi	(New Zealand) Ajeet Rai (United Kingdom) George Loffhagen (India) Nitin Kumar Sinha (Japan) Takashi Saito
September 2	Hua Hin, Thailand; Hard; M15; Singles and Doubles Draws	(Chinese Taipei) Ray Ho (Canada) Kelsey Stevenson; 7–6^{(7–4)}, 6–2	(United Kingdom) George Loffhagen (New Zealand) Ajeet Rai	(India) Sidharth Rawat (Japan) Yusuke Takahashi	(New Zealand) Ajeet Rai (United Kingdom) George Loffhagen (India) Nitin Kumar Sinha (Japan) Takashi Saito
September 2	Tabarka, Tunisia; Clay; M15; Singles and Doubles Draws	(Argentina) Tomás Martín Etcheverry; 6–4, 6–1	(Zimbabwe) Benjamin Lock	(Spain) Imanol López Morillo (Brazil) Mateus Alves	(Germany) Paul Wörner (Sweden) Gustav Hansson (Slovenia) Tomás Lipovšek Puches (Estonia) Kenneth Raisma
September 2	Tabarka, Tunisia; Clay; M15; Singles and Doubles Draws	(Slovenia) Tomás Lipovšek Puches (Argentina) Matías Zukas; 7–6^{(7–2)}, 6–4	(Russia) Andrey Chepelev (France) Clément Tabur	(Spain) Imanol López Morillo (Brazil) Mateus Alves	(Germany) Paul Wörner (Sweden) Gustav Hansson (Slovenia) Tomás Lipovšek Puches (Estonia) Kenneth Raisma
September 9	Mulhouse, France; Hard (indoor); M25+H; Singles and Doubles Draws	(France) Dan Added; 7–6^{(7–4)}, 2–6, 6–3	(France) Arthur Rinderknech	(France) Antoine Escoffier (Germany) Tobias Simon	(France) Evan Furness (Netherlands) Gijs Brouwer (Russia) Alen Avidzba (France) Grégoire Jacq
September 9	Mulhouse, France; Hard (indoor); M25+H; Singles and Doubles Draws	(Netherlands) Gijs Brouwer (Netherlands) Glenn Smits; 6–4, 7–6^{(8–6)}	(Switzerland) Antoine Bellier (Belgium) Christopher Heyman	(France) Antoine Escoffier (Germany) Tobias Simon	(France) Evan Furness (Netherlands) Gijs Brouwer (Russia) Alen Avidzba (France) Grégoire Jacq
September 9	Pula, Italy; Clay; M25; Singles and Doubles Draws	(Brazil) Wilson Leite; 3–0, ret.	(Brazil) Bruno Sant'Anna	(Italy) Davide Galoppini (Italy) Nicolò Turchetti	(Italy) Marco Bortolotti (Italy) Antonio Massara (Poland) Michał Dembek (Italy) Omar Giacalone
September 9	Pula, Italy; Clay; M25; Singles and Doubles Draws	(Italy) Giorgio Portaluri (Italy) Giuseppe Tresca; 6–3, 4–6, [10–8]	(Italy) Marco Bortolotti (Italy) Nicolò Turchetti	(Italy) Davide Galoppini (Italy) Nicolò Turchetti	(Italy) Marco Bortolotti (Italy) Antonio Massara (Poland) Michał Dembek (Italy) Omar Giacalone
September 9	Seville, Spain; Clay; M25; Singles and Doubles Draws	(Brazil) Orlando Luz; 6–2, 6–1	(Spain) Sergio Gutiérrez Ferrol	(Brazil) Daniel Dutra da Silva (Spain) Carlos Gimeno Valero	(Spain) Pol Martín Tiffon (Germany) Marvin Netuschil (Colombia) Alejandro Gómez (Russia) Bogdan Bobrov
September 9	Seville, Spain; Clay; M25; Singles and Doubles Draws	(Brazil) Orlando Luz (Brazil) Rafael Matos; 6–1, 6–3	(Spain) Sergio Gutiérrez Ferrol (Spain) Sergi Pérez Contri	(Brazil) Daniel Dutra da Silva (Spain) Carlos Gimeno Valero	(Spain) Pol Martín Tiffon (Germany) Marvin Netuschil (Colombia) Alejandro Gómez (Russia) Bogdan Bobrov
September 9	Varna, Bulgaria; Clay; M15; Singles and Doubles Draws	(Argentina) Juan Ignacio Galarza; 6–2, 6–2	(France) Quentin Folliot	(Croatia) Karlo Kranić (Argentina) Juan Pablo Paz	(Russia) Denis Klok (Bulgaria) Simon Anthony Ivanov (Ukraine) Nikita Mashtakov (Germany) Tim Heger
September 9	Varna, Bulgaria; Clay; M15; Singles and Doubles Draws	(France) Quentin Folliot (Poland) Piotr Matuszewski; 6–1, 6–2	(Argentina) Juan Ignacio Galarza (Argentina) Dante Gennaro	(Croatia) Karlo Kranić (Argentina) Juan Pablo Paz	(Russia) Denis Klok (Bulgaria) Simon Anthony Ivanov (Ukraine) Nikita Mashtakov (Germany) Tim Heger
September 9	Cairo, Egypt; Clay; M15; Singles and Doubles Draws	(Russia) Dimitriy Voronin; 6–2, 7–5	(Spain) José Francisco Vidal Azorín	(Austria) Lenny Hampel (Italy) Alexander Weis	(Italy) Luca Prevosto (Italy) Stefano Battaglino (Italy) Giovanni Calvano (Belgium) Benjamin D'Hoe
September 9	Cairo, Egypt; Clay; M15; Singles and Doubles Draws	(United States) Dennis Uspensky (Netherlands) Bart van der Berg; 6–0, 6–3	(Russia) Artem Oganesyan (Russia) Dimitriy Voronin	(Austria) Lenny Hampel (Italy) Alexander Weis	(Italy) Luca Prevosto (Italy) Stefano Battaglino (Italy) Giovanni Calvano (Belgium) Benjamin D'Hoe
September 9	Shymkent, Kazakhstan; Clay; M15; Singles and Doubles Draws	(Russia) Ivan Davydov; 7–6^{(7–4)}, 6–2	(Russia) Alexander Igoshin	(Russia) Matvey Khomentovskiy (Russia) Alexey Zakharov	(Ukraine) Vladyslav Manafov (Russia) Vladimir Korolev (Chinese Taipei) Tan Li-wei (Russia) Matvey Minin
September 9	Shymkent, Kazakhstan; Clay; M15; Singles and Doubles Draws	(Russia) Alexander Igoshin (Russia) Alexey Zakharov; 6–4, 6–2	(Kazakhstan) Timur Khabibulin (Ukraine) Vladyslav Manafov	(Russia) Matvey Khomentovskiy (Russia) Alexey Zakharov	(Ukraine) Vladyslav Manafov (Russia) Vladimir Korolev (Chinese Taipei) Tan Li-wei (Russia) Matvey Minin
September 9	Cancún, Mexico; Hard; M15; Singles and Doubles Draws	(Colombia) Cristian Rodríguez; 6–4, 2–1, ret.	(United States) Gage Brymer	(Peru) Jorge Panta (United States) Adam El Mihdawy	(Japan) Naoki Nakagawa (Canada) Taha Baadi (Colombia) Juan Sebastián Gómez (Canada) David Volfson
September 9	Cancún, Mexico; Hard; M15; Singles and Doubles Draws	(Republic of Ireland) Julian Bradley (United Kingdom) Jack Findel-Hawkins; 7–6^{(7–2)}, 7–5	(Colombia) Juan Sebastián Gómez (Peru) Jorge Panta	(Peru) Jorge Panta (United States) Adam El Mihdawy	(Japan) Naoki Nakagawa (Canada) Taha Baadi (Colombia) Juan Sebastián Gómez (Canada) David Volfson
September 9	Brașov, Romania; Clay; M15; Singles and Doubles Draws	(Romania) Nicholas David Ionel; 6–4, 7–5	(Ukraine) Oleksii Krutykh	(Bosnia and Herzegovina) Aziz Kijametović (Romania) Nicolae Frunză	(Romania) Cezar Crețu (Romania) Petru-Alexandru Luncanu (Romania) Călin Manda (Romania) Dan Alexandru Tomescu
September 9	Brașov, Romania; Clay; M15; Singles and Doubles Draws	(Romania) Bogdan Ionuț Apostol (Romania) Nicolae Frunză; 6–4, 6–2	(Romania) Cezar Crețu (Romania) Dan Alexandru Tomescu	(Bosnia and Herzegovina) Aziz Kijametović (Romania) Nicolae Frunză	(Romania) Cezar Crețu (Romania) Petru-Alexandru Luncanu (Romania) Călin Manda (Romania) Dan Alexandru Tomescu
September 9	Tabarka, Tunisia; Clay; M15; Singles and Doubles Draws	(France) Thomas Laurent; 6–0, 6–1	(Tunisia) Moez Echargui	(Morocco) Anas Fattar (Argentina) Sebastián Báez	(Argentina) Francisco Comesaña (Italy) Marco Miceli (Russia) Andrey Chepelev (Belarus) Mikalai Haliak
September 9	Tabarka, Tunisia; Clay; M15; Singles and Doubles Draws	(Tunisia) Moez Echargui (France) Thomas Setodji; 6–2, 6–4	(Germany) Henri Squire (Germany) Paul Wörner	(Morocco) Anas Fattar (Argentina) Sebastián Báez	(Argentina) Francisco Comesaña (Italy) Marco Miceli (Russia) Andrey Chepelev (Belarus) Mikalai Haliak
September 9	Champaign, United States; Hard; M15; Singles and Doubles Draws	(Argentina) Axel Geller; 6–3, 4–6, 6–3	(Australia) Adam Walton	(Brazil) Matheus Pucinelli de Almeida (United States) Aleksandar Kovacevic	(United States) Ezekiel Clark (United States) Tom Fawcett (United States) Zachary Svajda (Canada) Liam Draxl
September 9	Champaign, United States; Hard; M15; Singles and Doubles Draws	(Syria) Kareem Al Allaf (United States) Zachary Svajda; 7–5, 7–6^{(7–3)}	(Brazil) Alex Blumenberg (Brazil) Matheus Pucinelli de Almeida	(Brazil) Matheus Pucinelli de Almeida (United States) Aleksandar Kovacevic	(United States) Ezekiel Clark (United States) Tom Fawcett (United States) Zachary Svajda (Canada) Liam Draxl
September 16	Cairns, Australia; Hard; M25; Singles and Doubles Draws	(Australia) Blake Mott; 7–5, 6–2	(Ukraine) Vladyslav Orlov	(Australia) Maverick Banes (United Kingdom) Brydan Klein	(Australia) Bradley Mousley (Australia) Thomas Fancutt (Australia) Brandon Walkin (France) Alexis Musialek
September 16	Cairns, Australia; Hard; M25; Singles and Doubles Draws	(Australia) Calum Puttergill (Australia) Brandon Walkin; 6–4, 5–7, [10–5]	(Ukraine) Vladyslav Orlov (New Zealand) Rhett Purcell	(Australia) Maverick Banes (United Kingdom) Brydan Klein	(Australia) Bradley Mousley (Australia) Thomas Fancutt (Australia) Brandon Walkin (France) Alexis Musialek
September 16	Plaisir, France; Hard (indoor); M25+H; Singles and Doubles Draws	(Belgium) Yannick Mertens; 6–3, 6–0	(Belgium) Christopher Heyman	(Sweden) Filip Bergevi (France) Grégoire Jacq	(Switzerland) Antoine Bellier (Germany) Mats Rosenkranz (France) Valentin Royer (France) Lucas Poullain
September 16	Plaisir, France; Hard (indoor); M25+H; Singles and Doubles Draws	(Switzerland) Antoine Bellier (France) Maxime Tchoutakian; 7–6^{(7–3)}, 6–4	(Belgium) Christopher Heyman (Belgium) Yannick Mertens	(Sweden) Filip Bergevi (France) Grégoire Jacq	(Switzerland) Antoine Bellier (Germany) Mats Rosenkranz (France) Valentin Royer (France) Lucas Poullain
September 16	Pula, Italy; Clay; M25; Singles and Doubles Draws	(Netherlands) Thiemo de Bakker; 6–2, 6–4	(Germany) Lucas Gerch	(Italy) Gianluca Di Nicola (Italy) Matteo Gigante	(Italy) Federico Iannaccone (Italy) Marco Bortolotti (Brazil) Wilson Leite (Italy) Alessandro Petrone
September 16	Pula, Italy; Clay; M25; Singles and Doubles Draws	(Netherlands) Thiemo de Bakker (France) Clément Tabur; 2–6, 6–1, [10–7]	(Italy) Jacopo Berrettini (Italy) Alessandro Petrone	(Italy) Gianluca Di Nicola (Italy) Matteo Gigante	(Italy) Federico Iannaccone (Italy) Marco Bortolotti (Brazil) Wilson Leite (Italy) Alessandro Petrone
September 16	Madrid, Spain; Clay (indoor); M25; Singles and Doubles Draws	(France) Benjamin Bonzi; 6–2, 7–6^{(7–5)}	(Colombia) Alejandro González	(Spain) Sergio Gutiérrez Ferrol (Brazil) Daniel Dutra da Silva	(Spain) Carlos Sánchez Jover (Spain) Carlos Gimeno Valero (Spain) Pol Martín Tiffon (Italy) Daniele Capecchi
September 16	Madrid, Spain; Clay (indoor); M25; Singles and Doubles Draws	(Colombia) Alejandro Gómez (United States) Junior Alexander Ore; 6–0, 6–4	(Bolivia) Boris Arias (Argentina) Manuel Peña López	(Spain) Sergio Gutiérrez Ferrol (Brazil) Daniel Dutra da Silva	(Spain) Carlos Sánchez Jover (Spain) Carlos Gimeno Valero (Spain) Pol Martín Tiffon (Italy) Daniele Capecchi
September 16	Houston, United States; Hard; M25; Singles and Doubles Draws	(France) Hugo Gaston; 6–1, 6–3	(Italy) Liam Caruana	(United States) Alexander Sarkissian (United States) Austin Rapp	(United States) Ronald Hohmann (Romania) Dragoș Constantin Ignat (United States) Lukas Greif (United States) Oliver Crawford
September 16	Houston, United States; Hard; M25; Singles and Doubles Draws	(United States) Oliver Crawford (United States) Sam Riffice; 7–5, 3–6, [10–3]	(United States) Austin Rapp (United States) Preston Touliatos	(United States) Alexander Sarkissian (United States) Austin Rapp	(United States) Ronald Hohmann (Romania) Dragoș Constantin Ignat (United States) Lukas Greif (United States) Oliver Crawford
September 16	Buenos Aires, Argentina; Clay; M15; Singles and Doubles Draws	(Argentina) Gonzalo Villanueva; 4–6, 6–4, 6–1	(Argentina) Maximiliano Estévez	(Argentina) Guido Iván Justo (Argentina) Genaro Alberto Olivieri	(Argentina) Facundo Juárez (Uruguay) Martín Cuevas (Chile) Bastián Malla (Argentina) Facundo Díaz Acosta
September 16	Buenos Aires, Argentina; Clay; M15; Singles and Doubles Draws	(Argentina) Matías Franco Descotte (Chile) Bastián Malla; 3–6, 6–4, [10–7]	(Argentina) Maximiliano Estévez (Bolivia) Federico Zeballos	(Argentina) Guido Iván Justo (Argentina) Genaro Alberto Olivieri	(Argentina) Facundo Juárez (Uruguay) Martín Cuevas (Chile) Bastián Malla (Argentina) Facundo Díaz Acosta
September 16	Nanchang, China; Clay (indoor); M15; Singles and Doubles Draws	(Japan) Ryota Tanuma; 6–3, 6–4	(United States) Dusty Boyer	(Japan) Makoto Ochi (Switzerland) Luca Castelnuovo	(China) Li Jianhui (India) Vinayak Sharma Kaza (China) Wu Hao (China) Li Yuanfeng
September 16	Nanchang, China; Clay (indoor); M15; Singles and Doubles Draws	(Switzerland) Luca Castelnuovo (India) Anirudh Chandrasekar; 6–2, 5–7, [10–8]	(China) Wang Ruixuan (China) Yu Bingyu	(Japan) Makoto Ochi (Switzerland) Luca Castelnuovo	(China) Li Jianhui (India) Vinayak Sharma Kaza (China) Wu Hao (China) Li Yuanfeng
September 16	Cairo, Egypt; Clay; M15; Singles and Doubles Draws	(Poland) Daniel Michalski; 6–2, 7–6^{(7–3)}	(France) Matthieu Perchicot	(Italy) Simone Roncalli (Spain) José Francisco Vidal Azorín	(Austria) Lenny Hampel (Russia) Dimitriy Voronin (Italy) Edoardo Lavagno (Italy) Luca Tomasetto
September 16	Cairo, Egypt; Clay; M15; Singles and Doubles Draws	(Slovenia) Tomás Lipovšek Puches (United States) Dennis Uspensky; 6–1, 6–2	(Russia) Roman Blokhin (Georgia (country)) Zura Tkemaladze	(Italy) Simone Roncalli (Spain) José Francisco Vidal Azorín	(Austria) Lenny Hampel (Russia) Dimitriy Voronin (Italy) Edoardo Lavagno (Italy) Luca Tomasetto
September 16	Pajulahti, Finland; Hard (indoor); M15; Singles and Doubles Draws	(Russia) Savriyan Danilov; 6–7^{(2–7)}, 6–4, 6–3	(Germany) Robert Strombachs	(Finland) Patrik Niklas-Salminen (Japan) Naoki Tajima	(Russia) Alibek Kachmazov (Belarus) Alexander Zgirovsky (Turkey) Yankı Erel (Monaco) Lucas Catarina
September 16	Pajulahti, Finland; Hard (indoor); M15; Singles and Doubles Draws	(Monaco) Lucas Catarina (France) Baptiste Crepatte; 6–4, 1–6, [10–5]	(Netherlands) Jesper de Jong (Netherlands) Ryan Nijboer	(Finland) Patrik Niklas-Salminen (Japan) Naoki Tajima	(Russia) Alibek Kachmazov (Belarus) Alexander Zgirovsky (Turkey) Yankı Erel (Monaco) Lucas Catarina
September 16	Shymkent, Kazakhstan; Clay; M15; Singles and Doubles Draws	(Uzbekistan) Sergey Fomin; 2–6, 6–2, 6–4	(Russia) Alexey Zakharov	(Russia) Matvey Khomentovskiy (Ukraine) Vladyslav Manafov	(Russia) Vladimir Korolev (Kazakhstan) Dostanbek Tashbulatov (Georgia (country)) George Tsivadze (Russia) Mikhail Fufygin
September 16	Shymkent, Kazakhstan; Clay; M15; Singles and Doubles Draws	(Russia) Vladimir Korolev (Russia) Andrey Uvarov; 3–6, 7–6^{(9–7)}, [10–3]	(Kazakhstan) Timur Khabibulin (Ukraine) Vladyslav Manafov	(Russia) Matvey Khomentovskiy (Ukraine) Vladyslav Manafov	(Russia) Vladimir Korolev (Kazakhstan) Dostanbek Tashbulatov (Georgia (country)) George Tsivadze (Russia) Mikhail Fufygin
September 16	Cancún, Mexico; Hard; M15; Singles and Doubles Draws	(United States) Adam El Mihdawy; 6–4, 6–7^{(2–7)}, 6–1	(Colombia) Cristian Rodríguez	(Dominican Republic) Peter Bertran (United Kingdom) Jack Findel-Hawkins	(United States) Tyler Mercier (Canada) Taha Baadi (Peru) Jorge Panta (Bolivia) Alejandro Mendoza
September 16	Cancún, Mexico; Hard; M15; Singles and Doubles Draws	(Republic of Ireland) Julian Bradley (United Kingdom) Jack Findel-Hawkins; 6–3, 6–2	(Colombia) Juan Sebastián Gómez (Peru) Jorge Panta	(Dominican Republic) Peter Bertran (United Kingdom) Jack Findel-Hawkins	(United States) Tyler Mercier (Canada) Taha Baadi (Peru) Jorge Panta (Bolivia) Alejandro Mendoza
September 16	Târgu Mureș, Romania; Clay; M15; Singles and Doubles Draws	(Romania) Nicholas David Ionel; 6–7^{(1–7)}, 7–5, 6–4	(Argentina) Juan Ignacio Galarza	(Ukraine) Oleksii Krutykh (Romania) Bogdan Ionuț Apostol	(Romania) Sebastian Gima (Romania) Dan Alexandru Tomescu (Ukraine) Nikita Mashtakov (Romania) Bogdan Borza
September 16	Târgu Mureș, Romania; Clay; M15; Singles and Doubles Draws	(Romania) Cezar Crețu (Romania) Nini Gabriel Dica; 4–6, 7–6^{(9–7)}, [10–7]	(Romania) Bogdan Ionuț Apostol (Romania) Petru-Alexandru Luncanu	(Ukraine) Oleksii Krutykh (Romania) Bogdan Ionuț Apostol	(Romania) Sebastian Gima (Romania) Dan Alexandru Tomescu (Ukraine) Nikita Mashtakov (Romania) Bogdan Borza
September 16	Zlatibor, Serbia; Clay; M15; Singles and Doubles Draws	(Bosnia and Herzegovina) Nerman Fatić; 7–5, 6–3	(Hungary) Péter Nagy	(Croatia) Matija Pecotić (Serbia) Marko Miladinović	(Croatia) Duje Ajduković (Croatia) Duje Kekez (Czech Republic) Tomáš Jiroušek (Croatia) Karlo Kranić
September 16	Zlatibor, Serbia; Clay; M15; Singles and Doubles Draws	(Montenegro) Ljubomir Čelebić (Bosnia and Herzegovina) Nemanja Malešević; 6–3, 3–6, [10–4]	(Hungary) Mátyás Füle (Hungary) Gergely Madarász	(Croatia) Matija Pecotić (Serbia) Marko Miladinović	(Croatia) Duje Ajduković (Croatia) Duje Kekez (Czech Republic) Tomáš Jiroušek (Croatia) Karlo Kranić
September 16	Tabarka, Tunisia; Clay; M15; Singles and Doubles Draws	(Russia) Bogdan Bobrov; 6–4, 6–4	(France) Thomas Laurent	(Tunisia) Aziz Dougaz (Italy) Marco Miceli	(Brazil) Mateus Alves (Germany) Niklas Guttau (Czech Republic) Ondřej Krstev (Burundi) Guy Orly Iradukunda
September 16	Tabarka, Tunisia; Clay; M15; Singles and Doubles Draws	(Germany) Niklas Guttau (Germany) George von Massow; 7–5, 2–6, [10–8]	(Russia) Bogdan Bobrov (Netherlands) Marc Dijkhuizen	(Tunisia) Aziz Dougaz (Italy) Marco Miceli	(Brazil) Mateus Alves (Germany) Niklas Guttau (Czech Republic) Ondřej Krstev (Burundi) Guy Orly Iradukunda
September 16	Antalya, Turkey; Clay; M15; Singles and Doubles Draws	(Russia) Ivan Nedelko; 3–6, 6–4, 6–4	(Czech Republic) Michael Vrbenský	(Poland) Kacper Żuk (Ukraine) Vitaliy Sachko	(Slovenia) Mike Urbanija (Turkey) Marsel İlhan (Germany) Sebastian Prechtel (Germany) Kai Wehnelt
September 16	Antalya, Turkey; Clay; M15; Singles and Doubles Draws	(Poland) Jan Zieliński (Poland) Kacper Żuk; 3–6, 6–1, [10–8]	(India) Adil Kalyanpur (Canada) Kelsey Stevenson	(Poland) Kacper Żuk (Ukraine) Vitaliy Sachko	(Slovenia) Mike Urbanija (Turkey) Marsel İlhan (Germany) Sebastian Prechtel (Germany) Kai Wehnelt
September 16	Fayetteville, United States; Hard; M15; Singles and Doubles Draws	(Australia) Rinky Hijikata; 2–6, 6–2, 6–1	(United States) Nick Chappell	(Japan) Takuto Niki (Sweden) Carl Söderlund	(Spain) Óscar Mesquida Berg (Bulgaria) Ivailo Keremedchiev (Bolivia) Murkel Dellien (United States) Trent Bryde
September 16	Fayetteville, United States; Hard; M15; Singles and Doubles Draws	(Czech Republic) Dominik Kellovský (Czech Republic) Matěj Vocel; 1–6, 6–3, [13–11]	(United States) Nick Chappell (United States) Reese Stalder	(Japan) Takuto Niki (Sweden) Carl Söderlund	(Spain) Óscar Mesquida Berg (Bulgaria) Ivailo Keremedchiev (Bolivia) Murkel Dellien (United States) Trent Bryde
September 23	Darwin Tennis International; Darwin, Australia; Hard; M25; Singles and Doubles Draws	(Australia) Blake Mott; 6–1, 6–4	(Australia) Calum Puttergill	(Australia) Will Maher (United Kingdom) Brydan Klein	(Canada) Martin Beran (Ukraine) Vladyslav Orlov (Chinese Taipei) Hsu Yu-hsiou (Australia) Dayne Kelly
September 23	Darwin Tennis International; Darwin, Australia; Hard; M25; Singles and Doubles Draws	(Australia) Dayne Kelly (United Kingdom) Brydan Klein; 7–5, 7–5	(Australia) Thomas Fancutt (Australia) Matthew Romios	(Australia) Will Maher (United Kingdom) Brydan Klein	(Canada) Martin Beran (Ukraine) Vladyslav Orlov (Chinese Taipei) Hsu Yu-hsiou (Australia) Dayne Kelly
September 23	Říčany, Czech Republic; Clay; M25+H; Singles and Doubles Draws	(Czech Republic) Michael Vrbenský; 6–3, 3–6, 6–2	(Czech Republic) Vít Kopřiva	(Germany) Daniel Masur (Netherlands) Niels Lootsma	(Czech Republic) Jonáš Forejtek (Slovenia) Nik Razboršek (Czech Republic) Petr Nouza (Hungary) Péter Nagy
September 23	Říčany, Czech Republic; Clay; M25+H; Singles and Doubles Draws	(Czech Republic) Jonáš Forejtek (Czech Republic) Michael Vrbenský; 7–6^{(7–4)}, 7–6^{(7–5)}	(Netherlands) Niels Lootsma (Czech Republic) Petr Nouza	(Germany) Daniel Masur (Netherlands) Niels Lootsma	(Czech Republic) Jonáš Forejtek (Slovenia) Nik Razboršek (Czech Republic) Petr Nouza (Hungary) Péter Nagy
September 23	Pula, Italy; Clay; M25; Singles and Doubles Draws	(Bosnia and Herzegovina) Nerman Fatić; 6–2, 6–2	(Italy) Flavio Cobolli	(Italy) Jacopo Berrettini (France) Samuel Bensoussan	(Germany) Louis Wessels (Spain) Nikolás Sánchez Izquierdo (Brazil) Wilson Leite (Italy) Antonio Massara
September 23	Pula, Italy; Clay; M25; Singles and Doubles Draws	(Italy) Matteo Arnaldi (Italy) Jacopo Berrettini; 6–2, 6–2	(Italy) Luciano Darderi (Italy) Francesco Maestrelli	(Italy) Jacopo Berrettini (France) Samuel Bensoussan	(Germany) Louis Wessels (Spain) Nikolás Sánchez Izquierdo (Brazil) Wilson Leite (Italy) Antonio Massara
September 23	Almaty, Kazakhstan; Hard; M25; Singles and Doubles Draws	(Uzbekistan) Jurabek Karimov; 7–5, 6–2	(Kazakhstan) Beibit Zhukayev	(Kazakhstan) Denis Yevseyev (Austria) Jurij Rodionov	(Russia) Konstantin Kravchuk (Russia) Artem Dubrivnyy (United States) Alafia Ayeni (France) Manuel Guinard
September 23	Almaty, Kazakhstan; Hard; M25; Singles and Doubles Draws	(Belarus) Ivan Liutarevich (Ukraine) Vladyslav Manafov; 7–5, 6–2	(Kazakhstan) Grigoriy Lomakin (Georgia (country)) George Tsivadze	(Kazakhstan) Denis Yevseyev (Austria) Jurij Rodionov	(Russia) Konstantin Kravchuk (Russia) Artem Dubrivnyy (United States) Alafia Ayeni (France) Manuel Guinard
September 23	Jounieh, Lebanon; Clay; M25; Singles and Doubles Draws	(Morocco) Adam Moundir; 6–4, 6–3	(France) Corentin Denolly	(Egypt) Karim-Mohamed Maamoun (Lithuania) Laurynas Grigelis	(France) Matthieu Perchicot (Bulgaria) Alexandar Lazarov (Italy) Alessandro Bega (France) Jonathan Eysseric
September 23	Jounieh, Lebanon; Clay; M25; Singles and Doubles Draws	(Cyprus) Petros Chrysochos (Cyprus) Sergis Kyratzis; 6–3, 6–2	(Italy) Daniele Capecchi (Italy) Mirko Cutuli	(Egypt) Karim-Mohamed Maamoun (Lithuania) Laurynas Grigelis	(France) Matthieu Perchicot (Bulgaria) Alexandar Lazarov (Italy) Alessandro Bega (France) Jonathan Eysseric
September 23	Oliveira de Azeméis, Portugal; Hard; M25+H; Singles and Doubles Draws	(Tunisia) Skander Mansouri; 6–2, 6–1	(Colombia) Eduardo Struvay	(Spain) Roberto Ortega Olmedo (France) Matteo Martineau	(Portugal) Tiago Cação (Portugal) Fred Gil (Czech Republic) David Poljak (Belgium) Yannick Mertens
September 23	Oliveira de Azeméis, Portugal; Hard; M25+H; Singles and Doubles Draws	(Australia) Adam Taylor (Australia) Jason Taylor; 7–6^{(7–0)}, 7–5	(Switzerland) Riccardo Maiga (Spain) Pablo Vivero González	(Spain) Roberto Ortega Olmedo (France) Matteo Martineau	(Portugal) Tiago Cação (Portugal) Fred Gil (Czech Republic) David Poljak (Belgium) Yannick Mertens
September 23	Stockholm, Sweden; Hard (indoor); M25; Singles and Doubles Draws	(Poland) Kacper Żuk; 4–6, 6–4, 6–3	(Netherlands) Botic van de Zandschulp	(Latvia) Mārtiņš Podžus (Russia) Evgenii Tiurnev	(Finland) Patrik Niklas-Salminen (Czech Republic) Tomáš Macháč (Sweden) Gustav Hansson (Poland) Jan Zieliński
September 23	Stockholm, Sweden; Hard (indoor); M25; Singles and Doubles Draws	(Sweden) Filip Bergevi (France) Florian Lakat; 6–3, 7–6^{(7–3)}	(Poland) Jan Zieliński (Poland) Kacper Żuk	(Latvia) Mārtiņš Podžus (Russia) Evgenii Tiurnev	(Finland) Patrik Niklas-Salminen (Czech Republic) Tomáš Macháč (Sweden) Gustav Hansson (Poland) Jan Zieliński
September 23	Shrewsbury, United Kingdom; Hard (indoor); M25; Singles and Doubles Draws	(United Kingdom) Jack Draper; 6–4, 6–0	(Italy) Julian Ocleppo	(Germany) Tobias Simon (United Kingdom) Luke Johnson	(Italy) Francesco Vilardo (Germany) Robert Strombachs (United Kingdom) Arthur Fery (Republic of Ireland) Simon Carr
September 23	Shrewsbury, United Kingdom; Hard (indoor); M25; Singles and Doubles Draws	(United Kingdom) Elliott Farmer (United Kingdom) Alexander Jhun; 6–4, 6–3	(United Kingdom) Tom Hands (United Kingdom) James MacKinlay	(Germany) Tobias Simon (United Kingdom) Luke Johnson	(Italy) Francesco Vilardo (Germany) Robert Strombachs (United Kingdom) Arthur Fery (Republic of Ireland) Simon Carr
September 23	Harlingen, United States; Hard; M25; Singles and Doubles Draws	(United States) Govind Nanda; 6–4, 6–4	(Bulgaria) Adrian Andreev	(United States) Alex Rybakov (Germany) Timo Stodder	(United States) Logan Smith (Italy) Liam Caruana (United Kingdom) Jonathan Gray (Colombia) Nicolás Mejía
September 23	Harlingen, United States; Hard; M25; Singles and Doubles Draws	(United States) Harrison Adams (United States) George Goldhoff; 5–7, 6–3, [10–1]	(Honduras) Jaime Bendeck (Germany) Timo Stodder	(United States) Alex Rybakov (Germany) Timo Stodder	(United States) Logan Smith (Italy) Liam Caruana (United Kingdom) Jonathan Gray (Colombia) Nicolás Mejía
September 23	Nanchang, China; Clay (indoor); M15; Singles and Doubles Draws	(Japan) Makoto Ochi; 6–4, 6–7^{(5–7)}, 6–3	(Russia) Yan Sabanin	(Estonia) Vladimir Ivanov (Japan) Takashi Saito	(China) Wang Chukang (China) Wu Hao (Japan) Taisei Ichikawa (South Korea) Park Ui-sung
September 23	Nanchang, China; Clay (indoor); M15; Singles and Doubles Draws	(Estonia) Vladimir Ivanov (Russia) Yan Sabanin; 6–4, 7–5	(India) Anirudh Chandrasekar (India) Vijay Sundar Prashanth	(Estonia) Vladimir Ivanov (Japan) Takashi Saito	(China) Wang Chukang (China) Wu Hao (Japan) Taisei Ichikawa (South Korea) Park Ui-sung
September 23	Cairo, Egypt; Clay; M15; Singles and Doubles Draws	(Italy) Fabrizio Ornago; 6–4, 6–0	(Spain) José Francisco Vidal Azorín	(Italy) Simone Roncalli (Belgium) Simon Beaupain	(United States) Dennis Uspensky (Austria) Lenny Hampel (Italy) Stefano Battaglino (Poland) Daniel Michalski
September 23	Cairo, Egypt; Clay; M15; Singles and Doubles Draws	(Poland) Dominik Nazaruk (Poland) Yann Wójcik; 7–6^{(7–5)}, 2–6, [10–4]	(Italy) Stefano Battaglino (Italy) Fabrizio Ornago	(Italy) Simone Roncalli (Belgium) Simon Beaupain	(United States) Dennis Uspensky (Austria) Lenny Hampel (Italy) Stefano Battaglino (Poland) Daniel Michalski
September 23	Forbach, France; Carpet (indoor); M15; Singles and Doubles Draws	(Germany) Elmar Ejupovic; 6–4, 4–6, 6–3	(France) Harold Mayot	(Germany) Stefan Seifert (France) Hugo Schott	(France) Boris Fassbender (France) Arthur Bouquier (Germany) Milan Welte (Germany) Dominik Böhler
September 23	Forbach, France; Carpet (indoor); M15; Singles and Doubles Draws	(France) Dan Added (France) Albano Olivetti; 6–3, 6–4	(United Kingdom) Jack Findel-Hawkins (Germany) Lasse Muscheites	(Germany) Stefan Seifert (France) Hugo Schott	(France) Boris Fassbender (France) Arthur Bouquier (Germany) Milan Welte (Germany) Dominik Böhler
September 23	Cancún, Mexico; Hard; M15; Singles and Doubles Draws	(Peru) Jorge Panta; 2–6, 6–2, 6–3	(Peru) Mauricio Echazú	(Mexico) Mauricio Astorga (Colombia) Cristian Rodríguez	(United States) Nick Chappell (United States) Adam El Mihdawy (Canada) Taha Baadi (Colombia) Felipe Mantilla
September 23	Cancún, Mexico; Hard; M15; Singles and Doubles Draws	(Colombia) Juan Sebastián Gómez (Peru) Jorge Panta; 2–6, 6–4, [11–9]	(Colombia) Felipe Mantilla (Colombia) Cristian Rodríguez	(Mexico) Mauricio Astorga (Colombia) Cristian Rodríguez	(United States) Nick Chappell (United States) Adam El Mihdawy (Canada) Taha Baadi (Colombia) Felipe Mantilla
September 23	Johannesburg, South Africa; Hard; M15; Singles and Doubles Draws	(Zimbabwe) Benjamin Lock; 6–7^{(5–7)}, 6–3, 7–6^{(7–3)}	(Bulgaria) Alexander Donski	(Zimbabwe) Takanyi Garanganga (Austria) David Pichler	(France) Térence Atmane (Israel) Jordan Hasson (Iran) Hamidreza Nadaf (South Africa) Vaughn Hunter
September 23	Johannesburg, South Africa; Hard; M15; Singles and Doubles Draws	(Zimbabwe) Benjamin Lock (Zimbabwe) Courtney John Lock; 6–3, 6–4	(Bulgaria) Alexander Donski (Austria) David Pichler	(Zimbabwe) Takanyi Garanganga (Austria) David Pichler	(France) Térence Atmane (Israel) Jordan Hasson (Iran) Hamidreza Nadaf (South Africa) Vaughn Hunter
September 23	Melilla, Spain; Clay; M15; Singles and Doubles Draws	(Spain) Ricardo Ojeda Lara; 7–5, 6–4	(Kazakhstan) Timofei Skatov	(Spain) Eduard Esteve Lobato (Spain) Imanol López Morillo	(Chile) Diego Fernández Flores (Spain) Carlos Sánchez Jover (Spain) Benjamín Winter López (Russia) Alexander Zhurbin
September 23	Melilla, Spain; Clay; M15; Singles and Doubles Draws	(Spain) Juan Pablo Cañas García (Spain) Ricardo Ojeda Lara; 6–7^{(9–11)}, 6–3, [10–5]	(Spain) Eduard Esteve Lobato (Spain) Imanol López Morillo	(Spain) Eduard Esteve Lobato (Spain) Imanol López Morillo	(Chile) Diego Fernández Flores (Spain) Carlos Sánchez Jover (Spain) Benjamín Winter López (Russia) Alexander Zhurbin
September 23	Tabarka, Tunisia; Clay; M15; Singles and Doubles Draws	(Argentina) Ignacio Monzón; 6–1, 6–2	(Romania) Filip Cristian Jianu	(Tunisia) Aziz Dougaz (Slovenia) Tomás Lipovšek Puches	(Italy) Lorenzo Bocchi (Italy) Giacomo Dambrosi (Italy) Erik Crepaldi (Czech Republic) Ondřej Krstev
September 23	Tabarka, Tunisia; Clay; M15; Singles and Doubles Draws	(Argentina) Gregorio Cordonnier (Chile) Miguel Fernando Pereira; 6–1, 6–4	(Russia) Bogdan Bobrov (Netherlands) Marc Dijkhuizen	(Tunisia) Aziz Dougaz (Slovenia) Tomás Lipovšek Puches	(Italy) Lorenzo Bocchi (Italy) Giacomo Dambrosi (Italy) Erik Crepaldi (Czech Republic) Ondřej Krstev
September 23	Antalya, Turkey; Clay; M15; Singles and Doubles Draws	(Germany) Paul Wörner; 3–6, 6–3, 6–0	(Turkey) Marsel İlhan	(France) Luka Pavlovic (Turkey) Sarp Ağabigün	(Russia) Ivan Nedelko (Germany) Kai Wehnelt (Turkey) Cengiz Aksu (Netherlands) Guy den Heijer
September 23	Antalya, Turkey; Clay; M15; Singles and Doubles Draws	(Netherlands) Mats Hermans (Netherlands) Bart Stevens; 6–1, 7–6^{(7–1)}	(Turkey) Sarp Ağabigün (Germany) Paul Wörner	(France) Luka Pavlovic (Turkey) Sarp Ağabigün	(Russia) Ivan Nedelko (Germany) Kai Wehnelt (Turkey) Cengiz Aksu (Netherlands) Guy den Heijer
September 23	Chornomorsk, Ukraine; Clay; M15; Singles and Doubles Draws	(Ukraine) Vitaliy Sachko; 7–5, 4–6, 6–1	(Italy) Marco Bortolotti	(Hungary) Gergely Madarász (Ukraine) Nikita Mashtakov	(Bulgaria) Gabriel Donev (Ukraine) Artem Smirnov (Ukraine) Oleksii Krutykh (Ukraine) Oleg Prihodko
September 23	Chornomorsk, Ukraine; Clay; M15; Singles and Doubles Draws	(Hungary) Mátyás Füle (Hungary) Gergely Madarász; 4–6, 6–2, [13–11]	(Ukraine) Dmytro Kamynin (Ukraine) Nikita Mashtakov	(Hungary) Gergely Madarász (Ukraine) Nikita Mashtakov	(Bulgaria) Gabriel Donev (Ukraine) Artem Smirnov (Ukraine) Oleksii Krutykh (Ukraine) Oleg Prihodko
September 30	Brisbane, Australia; Hard; M25; Singles and Doubles Draws	(Australia) Dayne Kelly; 6–2, 6–4	(Australia) Luke Saville	(Australia) Bradley Mousley (Australia) Thomas Fancutt	(Australia) Tristan Schoolkate (Australia) Maverick Banes (Chinese Taipei) Hsu Yu-hsiou (Chinese Taipei) Lee Kuan-yi
September 30	Brisbane, Australia; Hard; M25; Singles and Doubles Draws	(Australia) Jake Delaney (Australia) Luke Saville; 6–1, 3–6, [10–6]	(Philippines) Francis Alcantara (Australia) Harry Bourchier	(Australia) Bradley Mousley (Australia) Thomas Fancutt	(Australia) Tristan Schoolkate (Australia) Maverick Banes (Chinese Taipei) Hsu Yu-hsiou (Chinese Taipei) Lee Kuan-yi
September 30	Nevers, France; Hard (indoor); M25+H; Singles and Doubles Draws	(France) Arthur Reymond; 3–6, 7–6^{(7–3)}, 6–4	(France) Quentin Halys	(France) Alexis Gautier (France) Dan Added	(France) Grégoire Jacq (France) Laurent Rochette (France) Arthur Bouquier (France) Mathias Bourgue
September 30	Nevers, France; Hard (indoor); M25+H; Singles and Doubles Draws	(France) Dan Added (France) Albano Olivetti; 6–4, 7–5	(France) Quentin Halys (France) Matteo Martineau	(France) Alexis Gautier (France) Dan Added	(France) Grégoire Jacq (France) Laurent Rochette (France) Arthur Bouquier (France) Mathias Bourgue
September 30	Pula, Italy; Clay; M25; Singles and Doubles Draws	(Bosnia and Herzegovina) Nerman Fatić; 6–2, 6–1	(Croatia) Nino Serdarušić	(Italy) Enrico Dalla Valle (Italy) Emiliano Maggioli	(Italy) Gianluca Di Nicola (Italy) Julian Ocleppo (United Kingdom) Toby Martin (Italy) Jacopo Berrettini
September 30	Pula, Italy; Clay; M25; Singles and Doubles Draws	(Italy) Lorenzo Musetti (Italy) Giulio Zeppieri; 6–3, 1–6, [10–8]	(Italy) Giovanni Fonio (Italy) Julian Ocleppo	(Italy) Enrico Dalla Valle (Italy) Emiliano Maggioli	(Italy) Gianluca Di Nicola (Italy) Julian Ocleppo (United Kingdom) Toby Martin (Italy) Jacopo Berrettini
September 30	Jounieh, Lebanon; Clay; M25; Singles and Doubles Draws	(Croatia) Matija Pecotić; 6–1, 4–6, 6–2	(France) Maxime Chazal	(Sweden) Jonathan Mridha (France) Jonathan Eysseric	(Lithuania) Laurynas Grigelis (Russia) Yan Bondarevskiy (France) Clément Tabur (Morocco) Adam Moundir
September 30	Jounieh, Lebanon; Clay; M25; Singles and Doubles Draws	(France) Corentin Denolly (France) Jonathan Eysseric; 6–7^{(4–7)}, 7–6^{(7–2)}, [10–7]	(Sweden) Eric Ahren Moonga (Sweden) Jonathan Mridha	(Sweden) Jonathan Mridha (France) Jonathan Eysseric	(Lithuania) Laurynas Grigelis (Russia) Yan Bondarevskiy (France) Clément Tabur (Morocco) Adam Moundir
September 30	Tavira, Portugal; Hard; M25; Singles and Doubles Draws	(Portugal) Frederico Ferreira Silva; 6–2, 6–1	(France) Alexandre Müller	(Colombia) Eduardo Struvay (United Kingdom) Evan Hoyt	(Republic of Ireland) Simon Carr (Spain) Roberto Ortega Olmedo (Tunisia) Skander Mansouri (Portugal) Tiago Cação
September 30	Tavira, Portugal; Hard; M25; Singles and Doubles Draws	(Spain) Alberto Barroso Campos (Spain) Roberto Ortega Olmedo; 6–4, 6–4	(Portugal) Francisco Cabral (United Kingdom) Luke Johnson	(Colombia) Eduardo Struvay (United Kingdom) Evan Hoyt	(Republic of Ireland) Simon Carr (Spain) Roberto Ortega Olmedo (Tunisia) Skander Mansouri (Portugal) Tiago Cação
September 30	Falun, Sweden; Hard (indoor); M25; Singles and Doubles Draws	(Latvia) Mārtiņš Podžus; 5–7, 6–3, 6–2	(Finland) Patrik Niklas-Salminen	(Poland) Wojciech Marek (Sweden) Christian Samuelsson	(Estonia) Daniil Glinka (Sweden) Filip Bergevi (Sweden) Karl Friberg (Netherlands) Mick Veldheer
September 30	Falun, Sweden; Hard (indoor); M25; Singles and Doubles Draws	(France) Florian Lakat (Poland) Jan Zieliński; 7–6^{(7–5)}, 6–1	(Latvia) Jānis Podžus (Latvia) Mārtiņš Podžus	(Poland) Wojciech Marek (Sweden) Christian Samuelsson	(Estonia) Daniil Glinka (Sweden) Filip Bergevi (Sweden) Karl Friberg (Netherlands) Mick Veldheer
September 30	Norman, United States; Hard; M25; Singles and Doubles Draws	(France) Hugo Gaston; 6–4, 7–5	(Belgium) Michael Geerts	(United States) Kevin King (Germany) Sebastian Fanselow	(United States) Evan Zhu (United States) Sekou Bangoura (United States) Spencer Papa (United States) Reese Stalder
September 30	Norman, United States; Hard; M25; Singles and Doubles Draws	(United States) Sekou Bangoura (United Kingdom) Lloyd Glasspool; 7–6^{(11–9)}, 6–2	(United States) Hunter Johnson (United States) Yates Johnson	(United States) Kevin King (Germany) Sebastian Fanselow	(United States) Evan Zhu (United States) Sekou Bangoura (United States) Spencer Papa (United States) Reese Stalder
September 30	Tây Ninh, Vietnam; Hard; M25; Singles and Doubles Draws	(United States) Daniel Nguyen; 6–3, 7–5	(Vietnam) Lý Hoàng Nam	(China) Bai Yan (Japan) Kazuki Nishiwaki	(Japan) Rimpei Kawakami (Russia) Alexey Zakharov (Japan) Yusuke Takahashi (Portugal) Gonçalo Oliveira
September 30	Tây Ninh, Vietnam; Hard; M25; Singles and Doubles Draws	(Kazakhstan) Grigoriy Lomakin (Japan) Jumpei Yamasaki; 6–0, 6–1	(India) Sidharth Rawat (India) Manish Sureshkumar	(China) Bai Yan (Japan) Kazuki Nishiwaki	(Japan) Rimpei Kawakami (Russia) Alexey Zakharov (Japan) Yusuke Takahashi (Portugal) Gonçalo Oliveira
September 30	Santiago, Chile; Clay; M15; Singles and Doubles Draws	(Argentina) Juan Manuel Cerúndolo; 6–1, 2–6, 6–3	(Argentina) Sebastián Báez	(Argentina) Maximiliano Estévez (Argentina) Alejo Lorenzo Lingua Lavallén	(Argentina) Juan Bautista Torres (Argentina) Santiago Rodríguez Taverna (Peru) Arklon Huertas del Pino (Argentina) Thiago Agustín Tirante
September 30	Santiago, Chile; Clay; M15; Singles and Doubles Draws	(Argentina) Gabriel Alejandro Hidalgo (Argentina) Federico Moreno; 7–6^{(7–5)}, 6–1	(Argentina) Santiago Besada (Argentina) Santiago Rodríguez Taverna	(Argentina) Maximiliano Estévez (Argentina) Alejo Lorenzo Lingua Lavallén	(Argentina) Juan Bautista Torres (Argentina) Santiago Rodríguez Taverna (Peru) Arklon Huertas del Pino (Argentina) Thiago Agustín Tirante
September 30	Nanchang, China; Clay (indoor); M15; Singles and Doubles Draws	(China) Mo Yecong; 6–0, 6–1	(China) Wang Chukang	(Estonia) Vladimir Ivanov (United States) Dusty Boyer	(Japan) Taisei Ichikawa (Chinese Taipei) Ray Ho (Chinese Taipei) Huang Tsung-hao (Ukraine) Oleg Khotkov
September 30	Nanchang, China; Clay (indoor); M15; Singles and Doubles Draws	(India) Anirudh Chandrasekar (India) Vijay Sundar Prashanth; 7–6^{(7–5)}, 6–4	(Chinese Taipei) Ray Ho (Hong Kong) Yeung Pak-long	(Estonia) Vladimir Ivanov (United States) Dusty Boyer	(Japan) Taisei Ichikawa (Chinese Taipei) Ray Ho (Chinese Taipei) Huang Tsung-hao (Ukraine) Oleg Khotkov
September 30	Sharm El Sheikh, Egypt; Hard; M15; Singles and Doubles Draws	(Czech Republic) Marek Gengel; 6–2, 5–7, 6–1	(Italy) Alessandro Bega	(Italy) Giorgio Ricca (Poland) Michał Dembek	(Italy) Francesco Vilardo (Tunisia) Anis Ghorbel (Ukraine) Vitaliy Sachko (Spain) David Pérez Sanz
September 30	Sharm El Sheikh, Egypt; Hard; M15; Singles and Doubles Draws	(Venezuela) Jordi Muñoz Abreu (Spain) David Pérez Sanz; 6–3, 3–6, [10–7]	(Czech Republic) Marek Gengel (Tunisia) Anis Ghorbel	(Italy) Giorgio Ricca (Poland) Michał Dembek	(Italy) Francesco Vilardo (Tunisia) Anis Ghorbel (Ukraine) Vitaliy Sachko (Spain) David Pérez Sanz
September 30	Santa Tecla, El Salvador; Hard; M15; Singles and Doubles Draws	(Venezuela) Ricardo Rodríguez; 4–6, 6–3, 6–4	(Peru) Jorge Panta	(Dominican Republic) José Olivares (Peru) Mauricio Echazú	(Mexico) Luis Patiño (Brazil) Alex Blumenberg (Ukraine) Eric Vanshelboim (United States) Justin Butsch
September 30	Santa Tecla, El Salvador; Hard; M15; Singles and Doubles Draws	(United States) Alec Adamson (United States) Luke Jacob Gamble; 6–3, 6–4	(Brazil) Alex Blumenberg (Argentina) Ignacio Carou	(Dominican Republic) José Olivares (Peru) Mauricio Echazú	(Mexico) Luis Patiño (Brazil) Alex Blumenberg (Ukraine) Eric Vanshelboim (United States) Justin Butsch
September 30	Pretoria, South Africa; Hard; M15; Singles and Doubles Draws	(Bulgaria) Alexander Donski; 7–6^{(7–3)}, 6–7^{(5–7)}, 7–6^{(8–6)}	(France) Arthur Cazaux	(Zimbabwe) Benjamin Lock (Zimbabwe) Mehluli Don Ayanda Sibanda	(Italy) Marco Brugnerotto (Serbia) Arsenije Zlatanović (Zimbabwe) Takanyi Garanganga (Austria) David Pichler
September 30	Pretoria, South Africa; Hard; M15; Singles and Doubles Draws	(Bulgaria) Alexander Donski (Canada) Raheel Manji; 6–2, 7–5	(Austria) David Pichler (Zimbabwe) Mehluli Don Ayanda Sibanda	(Zimbabwe) Benjamin Lock (Zimbabwe) Mehluli Don Ayanda Sibanda	(Italy) Marco Brugnerotto (Serbia) Arsenije Zlatanović (Zimbabwe) Takanyi Garanganga (Austria) David Pichler
September 30	Sabadell, Spain; Clay; M15; Singles and Doubles Draws	(Switzerland) Johan Nikles; 5–7, 6–4, 6–0	(Spain) Ricardo Ojeda Lara	(Spain) Nikolás Sánchez Izquierdo (France) Maxime Mora	(Russia) Kirill Kivattsev (Spain) Sergi Pérez Contri (Argentina) Manuel Peña López (Spain) Àlex Martí Pujolràs
September 30	Sabadell, Spain; Clay; M15; Singles and Doubles Draws	(Spain) Pedro Vives Marcos (Spain) Benjamín Winter López; 6–2, 4–6, [10–5]	(Argentina) Juan Ignacio Galarza (Argentina) Manuel Peña López	(Spain) Nikolás Sánchez Izquierdo (France) Maxime Mora	(Russia) Kirill Kivattsev (Spain) Sergi Pérez Contri (Argentina) Manuel Peña López (Spain) Àlex Martí Pujolràs
September 30	Tabarka, Tunisia; Clay; M15; Singles and Doubles Draws	(Russia) Bogdan Bobrov; 3–6, 6–3, 6–2	(Argentina) Fermín Tenti	(Germany) George von Massow (Belgium) Arnaud Bovy	(Romania) Filip Cristian Jianu (United States) Nicolas Moreno de Alboran (Russia) Ilarion Danilchenko (Switzerland) Damien Wenger
September 30	Tabarka, Tunisia; Clay; M15; Singles and Doubles Draws	(Germany) Niklas Guttau (Germany) George von Massow; 7–6^{(7–1)}, 4–6, [10–3]	(Russia) Ilarion Danilchenko (Chile) Miguel Fernando Pereira	(Germany) George von Massow (Belgium) Arnaud Bovy	(Romania) Filip Cristian Jianu (United States) Nicolas Moreno de Alboran (Russia) Ilarion Danilchenko (Switzerland) Damien Wenger
September 30	Antalya, Turkey; Clay; M15; Singles and Doubles Draws	(Czech Republic) Michael Vrbenský; 7–5, 6–3	(Germany) Peter Heller	(India) Adil Kalyanpur (Turkey) Cengiz Aksu	(Netherlands) Bart Stevens (Turkey) Marsel İlhan (Denmark) Holger Rune (Colombia) Alejandro Hoyos Franco
September 30	Antalya, Turkey; Clay; M15; Singles and Doubles Draws	(Netherlands) Mats Hermans (Netherlands) Bart Stevens; 7–6^{(7–5)}, 3–6, [10–7]	(Turkey) Tuna Altuna (Germany) Peter Heller	(India) Adil Kalyanpur (Turkey) Cengiz Aksu	(Netherlands) Bart Stevens (Turkey) Marsel İlhan (Denmark) Holger Rune (Colombia) Alejandro Hoyos Franco
