= 2011 Open Diputación Ciudad de Pozoblanco – Men's singles =

Men's singles
- 2011 Open Diputación Ciudad de Pozoblanco

Final
- Champion: (France) Kenny de Schepper
- Runner-up: (Spain) Iván Navarro
- Score: 2–6, 7–5, 6–3

Events
Singles	men	women
Doubles	men	women
← 2010 ·	Open Diputación Ciudad de Pozoblanco	· 2012 →

Rubén Ramírez Hidalgo was the defending champion; however, he was eliminated already in the first round by Ivo Klec.

Kenny de Schepper eliminated Íñigo Cervantes Huegun, Adrian Mannarino, Roberto Bautista Agut, Illya Marchenko and won in the final against Iván Navarro, 2–6, 7–5, 6–3.

== Seeds ==
1. (France) Adrian Mannarino (second round)
2. (Germany) Rainer Schüttler (quarterfinals)
3. (Ukraine) Illya Marchenko (semifinals, withdrew due to left knee injury)
4. (Spain) Rubén Ramírez Hidalgo (first round)
5. (Slovakia) Lukáš Lacko (first round)
6. (Russia) Alexander Kudryavtsev (quarterfinals, retired due to right knee injury)
7. (Russia) Konstantin Kravchuk (semifinals)
8. (Spain) Roberto Bautista Agut (quarterfinals)

== Draw ==
=== Key ===
- Q = Qualifier
- WC = Wild card
- LL = Lucky loser
- Alt = Alternate
- SE = Special exempt
- PR = Protected ranking
- ITF = ITF entry
- JE = Junior exempt
- w/o = Walkover
- r = Retired
- d = Defaulted
- SR = Special ranking

=== Finals ===
Semifinals
(France) Kenny de Schepper
3	(Ukraine) Illya Marchenko	w/o
(Spain) Iván Navarro	6	6
7	(Russia) Konstantin Kravchuk	3	4

Final
(France) Kenny de Schepper	2	7	6
(Spain) Iván Navarro	6	5	3

=== Top half ===
First round
1	(France) A Mannarino	6	6
(Russia) Aleksandr Lobkov	1	2
(France) K de Schepper	7^{7}	7
WC	(Spain) I Cervantes Huegun	6^{3}	5
(Spain) G Olaso	5	2
(Russia) D Matsukevich	7	6
WC	(Spain) Juan José Leal-Gómez	1	1
8	(Spain) R Bautista Agut	6	6
3	(Ukraine) I Marchenko	6	3	6
WC	(Spain) Carlos Gómez-Herrera	2	6	3
(France) L Walter	4	3
(France) Grégoire Burquier	6	6
(Ukraine) S Bubka	7	6^{6}	6^{3}
(United Kingdom) D Cox	5	7^{8}	7^{7}
Q	(Ukraine) D Molchanov	1	1
6	(Russia) A Kudryavtsev	6	6

Second round
1	(France) A Mannarino	4	6	2
(France) K de Schepper	6	2	6
(Russia) D Matsukevich	3	6	3
8	(Spain) R Bautista Agut	6	3	6
3	(Ukraine) I Marchenko	6	7^{7}
(France) Grégoire Burquier	3	6^{3}
(United Kingdom) D Cox	2	4
6	(Russia) A Kudryavtsev	6	6

Quarterfinals
(France) K de Schepper	6	6
8	(Spain) R Bautista Agut	3	4
3	(Ukraine) I Marchenko	6
6	(Russia) A Kudryavtsev	4^{r}

Semifinals
(France) K de Schepper
3	(Ukraine) I Marchenko	w/o

=== Bottom half ===
First round
5	(Slovakia) L Lacko	6^{9}	3
(Spain) I Navarro	7^{11}	6
WC	(Slovakia) M Mečíř Jr.	4	5
(Spain) A Brugués Davi	6	7
Q	(Spain) MÁ López Jaén	2	5
(Spain) P Carreño Busta	6	7
(Slovakia) I Klec	6	6
4	(Spain) R Ramírez Hidalgo	3	1
7	(Russia) K Kravchuk	6	6
(Spain) G Alcaide	3	0
Q	(Russia) E Kirillov	6	6
(Ecuador) G Lapentti	1	3
(Spain) A Menéndez	5
(France) J Ouanna	0^{r}
Q	(Russia) M Ledovskikh	2	4
2	(Germany) R Schüttler	6	6

Second round
(Spain) I Navarro	7^{7}	7^{9}
(Spain) A Brugués Davi	6^{4}	6^{7}
(Spain) P Carreño Busta	6	6
(Slovakia) I Klec	3	1
7	(Russia) K Kravchuk	6	6
Q	(Russia) E Kirillov	3	2
(Spain) A Menéndez	2	6	3
2	(Germany) R Schüttler	6	1	6

Quarterfinals
(Spain) I Navarro	6	2
(Spain) P Carreño Busta	4	1^{r}
7	(Russia) K Kravchuk	6	3	7
2	(Germany) R Schüttler	4	6	5

Semifinals
(Spain) I Navarro	6	6
7	(Russia) K Kravchuk	3	4
