= 2011 Open Diputación Ciudad de Pozoblanco – Men's doubles =

Men's doubles
- 2011 Open Diputación Ciudad de Pozoblanco

Final
- Champions: (Russia) Mikhail Elgin; (Russia) Alexander Kudryavtsev
- Runners-up: (Ukraine) Illya Marchenko; (Ukraine) Denys Molchanov
- Score: walkover

Events
Singles	men	women
Doubles	men	women
← 2010 ·	Open Diputación Ciudad de Pozoblanco	· 2012 →

Marcel Granollers and Gerard Granollers were the defending men's doubles tennis champions in the tournament, but decided not to participate.

First seeds Mikhail Elgin and Alexander Kudryavtsev won this event. They were supposed to play Illya Marchenko and Denys Molchanov; however the Ukrainian pair withdrew due to Marchenko's left knee injury.

== Seeds ==
1. (Russia) Mikhail Elgin / (Russia) Alexander Kudryavtsev (champion)
2. (Ukraine) Sergey Bubka / (Spain) Adrián Menéndez (semifinals)
3. (Russia) Ilya Belyaev / (Russia) Denis Matsukevich (first round)
4. (Spain) Guillermo Alcaide / (Slovakia) Ivo Klec (quarterfinals)

== Draw ==
=== Key ===
- Q = Qualifier
- WC = Wild card
- LL = Lucky loser
- Alt = Alternate
- SE = Special exempt
- PR = Protected ranking
- ITF = ITF entry
- JE = Junior exempt
- w/o = Walkover
- r = Retired
- d = Defaulted
- SR = Special ranking

=== Draw ===
First round

Quarterfinals

Semifinals

Final

1
- (Russia) M Elgin
- (Russia) A Kudryavtsev
6
6

(United Kingdom) D Cox
(United Kingdom) J Milton
6
6

(United Kingdom) D Cox
(United Kingdom) J Milton
2
2

- (France) G Burquier
- (France) L Walter
2
4

1
- (Russia) M Elgin
- (Russia) A Kudryavtsev
6
6^{3}
[10

3
- (Russia) I Belyaev
- (Russia) D Matsukevich
2
7^{7}
[5]

- (Spain) R Bautista Agut
- (Spain) I Navarro
2
7^{7}
[8]

- (Slovakia) L Lacko
- (Slovakia) M Mečíř Jr.
6
6^{5}
[10]

- (Slovakia) L Lacko
- (Slovakia) M Mečíř Jr.
w/o

(Spain) Juan José Leal-Gómez
(Spain) Borja Rodríguez Manzano
3
3

- (Spain) R Bautista Agut
- (Spain) I Navarro

- (Spain) R Bautista Agut
- (Spain) I Navarro
6
6

1
- (Russia) M Elgin
- (Russia) A Kudryavtsev
w/o

- (Spain) I Cervantes Huegun
- (Spain) G Olaso
6^{6}
3

- (Ukraine) I Marchenko
- (Ukraine) D Molchanov

- (Ukraine) I Marchenko
- (Ukraine) D Molchanov
7^{8}
6

- (Ukraine) I Marchenko
- (Ukraine) D Molchanov
6
6

WC
(Spain) Ivan Gómez Mantilla
(Spain) Jonathan Sotillo Navarro
0
6^{5}

4
- (Spain) G Alcaide
- (Slovakia) I Klec
1
3

4
- (Spain) G Alcaide
- (Slovakia) I Klec
6
7^{7}

- (Ukraine) I Marchenko
- (Ukraine) D Molchanov
7^{7}
6^{4}
[10]

(Switzerland) G Bastl
(Australia) Michael Look
6
6

2
- (Ukraine) S Bubka
- (Spain) A Menéndez
6^{5}
7^{7}
[6]

WC
(Spain) Joaquín Muñoz Bejarano
(Spain) Israel Sevilla
3
0

(Switzerland) G Bastl
(Australia) Michael Look
4
4

- (Spain) (Spain) A Brugués Davi
- (Spain) MÁ López Jaén
7^{7}
4
[8]

2
- (Ukraine) S Bubka
- (Spain) A Menéndez
6
6

2
- (Ukraine) S Bubka
- (Spain) A Menéndez
6^{3}
6
[10]
