= 2024 Open de Vendée – Singles =

Singles
- 2024 Open de Vendée

Final
- Champion: (France) Lucas Pouille
- Runner-up: (France) Quentin Halys
- Score: 6–4, 6–4

Events
Singles	Doubles
- Open de Vendée

Tomáš Macháč was the defending champion but chose not to defend his title.

Lucas Pouille won the title after defeating Quentin Halys 6–4, 6–4 in the final.

== Seeds ==
1. (France) Quentin Halys (final)
2. (France) Harold Mayot (semifinals)
3. (France) Richard Gasquet (second round)
4. (France) Lucas Pouille (champion)
5. (United Kingdom) Jacob Fearnley (withdrew)
6. (Serbia) Hamad Medjedovic (first round)
7. (France) Grégoire Barrère (first round)
8. (Denmark) August Holmgren (first round)

== Draw ==
Key

- Q = Qualifier
- WC = Wild card
- LL = Lucky loser
- Alt = Alternate
- ITF = ITF entry
- PR = Protected ranking
- SR = Special ranking
- SE = Special exempt
- JE = Junior exempt
- JR = Junior Accelerator Programme entrant
- CO = College Accelerator Programme entrant
- NG = Next Gen Accelerator Program entrant
- w/o = Walkover
- r = Retired
- d = Defaulted

=== Finals ===
Semifinals
1	(France) Quentin Halys	6	6
(Croatia) Dino Prižmić	1	4
4	(France) Lucas Pouille	6	6
2	(France) Harold Mayot	4	1

Final
1	(France) Quentin Halys	4	4
4	(France) Lucas Pouille	6	6

=== Top half ===
First round
1	(France) Q Halys	6	4	6
(France) M Martineau	3	6	4
(Estonia) M Lajal	6	6
(France) G Blancaneaux	4	2
Q	(France) M Bourgue	7^{7}	3	4
Q	(Netherlands) J Sels	6^{4}	6	6
Alt	(Germany) D Masur	5	4
LL	(France) Alexis Gautier	7	6
3	(France) R Gasquet	6	6
Q	(Georgia (country)) N Basilashvili	1	4
(Croatia) D Prižmić	7	1	6
WC	(France) L Poullain	5	6	2
WC	(France) S Gueymard Wayenburg	6	6
(United Kingdom) C Broom	3	2
(France) A Escoffier	6	6
6	(Serbia) H Medjedovic	3	2

Second round
1	(France) Q Halys	3	7^{7}	6
(Estonia) M Lajal	6	6^{3}	2
Q	(Netherlands) J Sels	7^{7}	6
LL	(France) A Gautier	6^{4}	4
3	(France) R Gasquet	7^{10}	5	3
(Croatia) D Prižmić	6^{8}	7	6
WC	(France) S Gueymard Wayenburg	4	6	6
(France) A Escoffier	6	2	3

Quarterfinals
1	(France) Q Halys	6	6
Q	(Netherlands) J Sels	4	1
(Croatia) D Prižmić	6	4	6
WC	(France) S Gueymard Wayenburg	4	6	3

Semifinals
1	(France) Q Halys	6	6
(Croatia) D Prižmić	1	4

=== Bottom half ===
First round
8	(Denmark) A Holmgren	1	1
WC	(France) M Guinard	6	6
(France) M Janvier	4	4
(Sweden) E Ymer	6	6
(France) C Hemery	3	6	6
(United States) M Damm	6	4	3
(France) G Debru	3	2
4	(France) L Pouille	6	6
7	(France) G Barrère	6	6^{12}	5
Q	A Vatutin	4	7^{14}	7
Q	(Belgium) B Gadamauri	3	4
(France) C Chidekh	6	6
(Italy) Samuel Vincent Ruggeri	6	6
LL	(Ivory Coast) E Coulibaly	1	4
Q	(France) Alexandre Reco	3	3
2	(France) H Mayot	6	6

Second round
WC	(France) M Guinard	7	7^{7}
(Sweden) E Ymer	5	6^{3}
(France) C Hemery	7^{8}	3	2
4	(France) L Pouille	6^{6}	6	6
Q	A Vatutin	1	4
(France) C Chidekh	6	6
(Italy) S Vincent Ruggeri	2	6^{9}
2	(France) H Mayot	6	7^{11}

Quarterfinals
WC	(France) M Guinard	6	5	1
4	(France) L Pouille	4	7	6
(France) C Chidekh	7^{7}	4	3
2	(France) H Mayot	6^{3}	6	6

Semifinals
4	(France) L Pouille	6	6
2	(France) H Mayot	4	1
