= 2012 Open Diputación Ciudad de Pozoblanco – Singles =

Singles
- 2012 Open Diputación Ciudad de Pozoblanco

Final
- Champion: (Spain) Roberto Bautista-Agut
- Runner-up: (Spain) Arnau Brugués-Davi
- Score: 6–3, 6–4

Events
Singles	Doubles
← 2011 ·	Open Diputación Ciudad de Pozoblanco	· 2021 →

Kenny de Schepper is the defending champion but lost in the first round this year.
Roberto Bautista-Agut won the title, defeating Arnau Brugués-Davi 6–3, 6–4 in the final.

== Seeds ==
1. (Spain) Roberto Bautista-Agut (champion)
2. (Portugal) Frederico Gil (first round)
3. (Spain) Daniel Muñoz de la Nava (first round)
4. (Russia) Evgeny Donskoy (semifinals)
5. (France) Josselin Ouanna (semifinals)
6. (Spain) Javier Martí (withdrew due to a left ankle injury)
7. (Spain) Adrián Menéndez Maceiras (first round)
8. (Spain) Tommy Robredo (quarterfinals)

== Draw ==
=== Key ===
- Q = Qualifier
- WC = Wild card
- LL = Lucky loser
- Alt = Alternate
- SE = Special exempt
- PR = Protected ranking
- ITF = ITF entry
- JE = Junior exempt
- w/o = Walkover
- r = Retired
- d = Defaulted
- SR = Special ranking

=== Finals ===
Semifinals
1	(Spain) Roberto Bautista-Agut	7^{7}	6
5	(France) Josselin Ouanna	6^{3}	4
4	(Russia) Evgeny Donskoy	5	5
(Spain) Arnau Brugués-Davi	7	7

Final
1	(Spain) Roberto Bautista-Agut	6	6
(Spain) Arnau Brugués-Davi	3	4

=== Top half ===
First round
1	(Spain) R Bautista-Agut	6	6
(France) G Burquier	2	2
WC	(Ukraine) I Marchenko	4	7^{7}	4
(Spain) I Navarro	6	6^{4}	6
Q	(France) Matthieu Roy	6^{6}	2
PR	(France) Charles-Antoine Brézac	7^{8}	6
(Russia) M Ledovskikh	0	0
8/WC	(Spain) T Robredo	6	6
3	(Spain) D Muñoz de la Nava	4	6^{6}
(France) A Mannarino	6	7^{8}
(Ukraine) D Molchanov	7	6
(Italy) L Vanni	5	4
Q	(France) O Charroin	4	6	3
(Spain) S Gutiérrez Ferrol	6	4	6
(France) K de Schepper	5	6^{6}
5	(France) J Ouanna	7	7^{8}

Second round
1	(Spain) R Bautista-Agut	6	6
(Spain) I Navarro	2	3
PR	(France) C-A Brézac	4	6	6^{5}
8/WC	(Spain) T Robredo	6	2	7^{7}
(France) A Mannarino	7^{7}	6
(Ukraine) D Molchanov	6^{3}	2
(Spain) S Gutiérrez Ferrol	6	4	6^{7}
5	(France) J Ouanna	4	6	7^{9}

Quarterfinals
1	(Spain) R Bautista-Agut	6	4	7^{9}
8/WC	(Spain) T Robredo	4	6	6^{7}
(France) A Mannarino	3	1
5	(France) J Ouanna	6	6

Semifinals
1	(Spain) R Bautista-Agut	7^{7}	6
5	(France) J Ouanna	6^{3}	4

=== Bottom half ===
First round
LL	(Spain) Ivan Arenas-Gualda	7^{7}	6
Q	(Spain) C Poch-Gradin	6^{3}	2
Q	(Italy) R Ghedin	1	7^{7}	6
(Czech Republic) J Minář	6	6^{5}	3
WC	(Spain) Roberto Carballes Baena	1	2
(Italy) T Fabbiano	6	6
(France) M Rodrigues	1	2
4	(Russia) E Donskoy	6	6
7	(Spain) A Menéndez Maceiras	6^{4}	6	6^{5}
(France) F Martin	7^{7}	3	7^{7}
(Spain) A Brugués-Davi	6	7^{7}
(Argentina) Nicolás Pastor	1	6^{4}
(Russia) K Kravchuk	5	3
(France) M Teixeira	7	6
(Belarus) U Ignatik	7^{7}	6
2/WC	(Portugal) F Gil	6^{5}	4

Second round
LL	(Spain) I Arenas-Gualda	6	3	4
Q	(Italy) R Ghedin	3	6	6
(Italy) T Fabbiano	2	5
4	(Russia) E Donskoy	6	7
(France) F Martin	2	3^{r}
(Spain) A Brugués-Davi	6	3
(France) M Teixeira	6^{5}	6	4
(Belarus) U Ignatik	7^{7}	4	6

Quarterfinals
Q	(Italy) R Ghedin	6^{4}	4
4	(Russia) E Donskoy	7^{7}	6
(Spain) A Brugués-Davi	7	6^{6}	6
(Belarus) U Ignatik	5	7^{8}	2

Semifinals
4	(Russia) E Donskoy	5	5
(Spain) A Brugués-Davi	7	7

== Bibliography ==
- Main draw
- Qualifying draw
