= 2010 Open Diputación Ciudad de Pozoblanco – Singles =

Singles
- 2010 Open Diputación Ciudad de Pozoblanco

Final
- Champion: (Spain) Rubén Ramírez Hidalgo
- Runner-up: (Spain) Roberto Bautista-Agut
- Score: 7–6(6), 6–4

Events
Singles	Doubles
← 2009 ·	Open Diputación Ciudad de Pozoblanco	· 2011 →

Karol Beck was the defender of the tournament title, but he opted to play in the ATP 250 tournament in Newport instead.
Rubén Ramírez Hidalgo won the final against Roberto Bautista-Agut, 7–6(6), 6–4.

== Seeds ==
1. (Germany) Rainer Schüttler (withdrew)
2. (Spain) Marcel Granollers (second round)
3. (Spain) Rubén Ramírez Hidalgo (champion)
4. (Switzerland) Stéphane Bohli (second round)
5. (France) David Guez (first round)
6. (Czech Republic) Jan Hernych (quarterfinals)
7. (France) Josselin Ouanna (second round)
8. (Belgium) Niels Desein (quarterfinals)

== Draw ==
=== Key ===
- Q = Qualifier
- WC = Wild card
- LL = Lucky loser
- Alt = Alternate
- SE = Special exempt
- PR = Protected ranking
- ITF = ITF entry
- JE = Junior exempt
- w/o = Walkover
- r = Retired
- d = Defaulted
- SR = Special ranking

=== Finals ===
Semifinals
(New Zealand) Daniel King-Turner	2	2
3	(Spain) Rubén Ramírez Hidalgo	6	6
(Russia) Konstantin Kravchuk	6	6^{1}	1
(Spain) Roberto Bautista-Agut	2	7	6

Final
3	(Spain) Rubén Ramírez Hidalgo	7	6
(Spain) Roberto Bautista-Agut	6^{6}	4

=== Top half ===
First round
LL	(Spain) M Fornell-Mestres	6	7
Q	(Spain) D Cañudas-Fernández	3	6^{1}
(Germany) G Kretschmer	6	6
(Latvia) A Juška	3	3
(New Zealand) D King-Turner	6	7
(Spain) G Alcaide	4	6^{5}
WC	(Spain) A Boje-Ordóñez	5	7	4
7	(France) J Ouanna	7	6^{7}	6
3	(Spain) R Ramírez Hidalgo	6	7
WC	(Spain) JJ Leal-Gómez	2	6^{5}
(Belgium) R Bemelmans	3	3
(France) A Mannarino	6	6
Q	(Austria) N Moser	4	4
Q	(Spain) P Martín-Adalia	6	6
(Romania) M Copil	6	3	4
8	(Belgium) N Desein	4	6	6

Second round
LL	(Spain) M Fornell-Mestres	3	6	4
(Germany) G Kretschmer	6	4	6
(New Zealand) D King-Turner
7	(France) J Ouanna	w/o
3	(Spain) R Ramírez Hidalgo	6	6
(France) A Mannarino	4	3
Q	(Spain) P Martín-Adalia	2	3
8	(Belgium) N Desein	6	6

Quarterfinals
(Germany) G Kretschmer	6	6^{7}	6^{7}
(New Zealand) D King-Turner	3	7	7
3	(Spain) R Ramírez Hidalgo	6	6
8	(Belgium) N Desein	3	0

Semifinals
(New Zealand) D King-Turner	2	2
3	(Spain) R Ramírez Hidalgo	6	6

=== Bottom half ===
First round
5	(France) D Guez	4	2
(Russia) E Kirillov	6	6
(Spain) C Poch-Gradin	2	3
(Russia) K Kravchuk	6	6
WC	(Spain) P Carreño-Busta	3	3
(Russia) A Kudryavtsev	6	6
Q	(Switzerland) G Bastl	4	3
4	(Switzerland) S Bohli	6	6
6	(Czech Republic) J Hernych	6	6
(Spain) P Santos	3	1
(Sweden) F Prpic	1	6	7
(France) C-A Brezac	6	3	6^{4}
WC	(Spain) G Granollers-Pujol	0	6^{5}
(Spain) R Bautista-Agut	6	7
(Germany) A Staschko	4	1
2	(Spain) M Granollers	6	6

Second round
(Russia) E Kirillov	4	4
(Russia) K Kravchuk	6	6
(Russia) A Kudryavtsev	6	6
4	(Switzerland) S Bohli	3	4
6	(Czech Republic) J Hernych	6	6^{1}	6
(Sweden) F Prpic	0	7	3
(Spain) R Bautista-Agut	7	6
2	(Spain) M Granollers	6^{3}	3

Quarterfinals
(Russia) K Kravchuk	7
(Russia) A Kudryavtsev	5	r
6	(Czech Republic) J Hernych	6^{4}	5
(Spain) R Bautista-Agut	7	7

Semifinals
(Russia) K Kravchuk	6	6^{1}	1
(Spain) R Bautista-Agut	2	7	6
