= 2023 Open de Tenis Ciudad de Pozoblanco – Singles =

Singles
- 2023 Open de Tenis Ciudad de Pozoblanco

Final
- Champion: (France) Hugo Grenier
- Runner-up: (Argentina) Juan Pablo Ficovich
- Score: 6–7^{(4–7)}, 6–2, 7–6^{(7–3)}

Events
Singles	Doubles
- Open de Tenis Ciudad de Pozoblanco

Constant Lestienne was the defending champion but chose not to defend his title.

Hugo Grenier won the title after defeating Juan Pablo Ficovich 6–7^{(4–7)}, 6–2, 7–6^{(7–3)} in the final.

== Seeds ==
1. (France) Hugo Grenier (champion)
2. (United States) Nicolas Moreno de Alboran (first round)
3. (Italy) Mattia Bellucci (second round)
4. (United States) Emilio Nava (second round)
5. (Spain) Pablo Llamas Ruiz (second round)
6. (France) Antoine Escoffier (quarterfinals)
7. (Lithuania) Ričardas Berankis (second round)
8. (Turkey) Cem İlkel (second round)

== Draw ==
Key

- Q = Qualifier
- WC = Wild card
- LL = Lucky loser
- Alt = Alternate
- ITF = ITF entry
- PR = Protected ranking
- SR = Special ranking
- SE = Special exempt
- JE = Junior exempt
- JR = Junior Accelerator Programme entrant
- CO = College Accelerator Programme entrant
- NG = Next Gen Accelerator Program entrant
- w/o = Walkover
- r = Retired
- d = Defaulted

=== Finals ===
Semifinals
1	(France) Hugo Grenier	6	3	6
(Spain) Alejandro Moro Cañas	4	6	1
(France) Térence Atmane	4	4
(Argentina) Juan Pablo Ficovich	6	6

Final
1	(France) Hugo Grenier	6^{4}	6	7^{7}
(Argentina) Juan Pablo Ficovich	7^{7}	2	6^{3}

=== Top half ===
First round
1	(France) H Grenier	6	3	6
PR	(France) P-H Herbert	3	6	4
A Kachmazov	7^{7}	7
Q	(Zimbabwe) B Lock	6^{1}	5
(Colombia) N Mejía	3	6^{5}
(Germany) D Masur	6	7^{7}
(Czech Republic) D Palán	4	4
6	(France) A Escoffier	6	6
3	(Italy) M Bellucci	7^{7}	6
(Germany) L Wessels	6^{4}	3
(France) D Added	6^{5}	6	7^{8}
(Switzerland) A Bellier	7^{7}	4	6^{6}
(Spain) A Moro Cañas	6	6^{8}	6
Q	(Spain) A Barroso Campos	4	7^{10}	3
(Spain) F Verdasco	2	6^{0}
5/WC	(Spain) P Llamas Ruiz	6	7^{7}

Second round
1	(France) H Grenier	7^{7}	6
A Kachmazov	6^{2}	3
(Germany) D Masur	4	4
6	(France) A Escoffier	6	6
3	(Italy) M Bellucci	6^{4}	6^{6}
(France) D Added	7^{7}	7^{8}
(Spain) A Moro Cañas	6	3	7
5/WC	(Spain) P Llamas Ruiz	1	6	5

Quarterfinals
1	(France) H Grenier	6	6
6	(France) A Escoffier	4	3
(France) D Added	4	3
(Spain) A Moro Cañas	6	6

Semifinals
1	(France) H Grenier	6	3	6
(Spain) A Moro Cañas	4	6	1

=== Bottom half ===
First round
7	(Lithuania) R Berankis	6	6
(France) Jules Marie	4	4
(France) T Atmane	7^{7}	7^{7}
Q	(Spain) P Vives Marcos	6^{2}	6^{0}
(Italy) L Giustino	1	2
WC	(Lithuania) E Butvilas	6	6
Q	(Spain) I Montes de la Torre	3	2
4	(United States) Em Nava	6	6
8	(Turkey) C İlkel	6^{4}	6	7^{7}
WC	(Spain) A Menéndez Maceiras	7^{7}	4	6^{2}
(Argentina) JP Ficovich	3	7^{7}	6
(United Kingdom) R Peniston	6	6^{0}	3
(Turkey) Y Erel	6	6
Q	(Poland) F Peliwo	1	1
Q	(Israel) D Cukierman	6	7^{8}
2	(United States) N Moreno de Alboran	4	6^{6}

Second round
7	(Lithuania) R Berankis	6^{2}	3
(France) T Atmane	7^{7}	6
WC	(Lithuania) E Butvilas	6	6
4	(United States) Em Nava	3	4
8	(Turkey) C İlkel	4	7^{7}	3
(Argentina) JP Ficovich	6	6^{5}	6
(Turkey) Y Erel	3	6	2
Q	(Israel) D Cukierman	6	1	6

Quarterfinals
(France) T Atmane	3	7^{7}	6
WC	(Lithuania) E Butvilas	6	6^{2}	4
(Argentina) JP Ficovich	6	3	7
Q	(Israel) D Cukierman	2	6	5

Semifinals
(France) T Atmane	4	4
(Argentina) JP Ficovich	6	6
