= 2011 Open Diputación Ciudad de Pozoblanco – Women's singles =

Women's singles
- 2011 Open Diputación Ciudad de Pozoblanco

Final
- Champion: (Greece) Eleni Daniilidou
- Runner-up: (Bulgaria) Elitsa Kostova
- Score: 6–3, 6–2

Events
Singles	men	women
Doubles	men	women
← 2010 ·	Open Diputación Ciudad de Pozoblanco

Olivia Sanchez was the defending champion, but chose not to participate.

Eleni Daniilidou won the title, defeating Elitsa Kostova in the final, 6–3, 6–2.

== Seeds ==
1. (Greece) Eleni Daniilidou (champion)
2. (Russia) Nina Bratchikova (quarterfinals)
3. (China) Lu Jingjing (quarterfinals)
4. (Bulgaria) Elitsa Kostova (final)
5. (Israel) Julia Glushko (quarterfinals)
6. (Spain) Beatriz García Vidagany (semifinals)
7. (United Kingdom) Naomi Broady (first round)
8. (Spain) Estrella Cabeza Candela (second round)

== Main draw ==
=== Key ===
- Q = Qualifier
- WC = Wild card
- LL = Lucky loser
- Alt = Alternate
- SE = Special exempt
- PR = Protected ranking
- ITF = ITF entry
- JE = Junior exempt
- w/o = Walkover
- r = Retired
- d = Defaulted
- SR = Special ranking

=== Finals ===
Semifinals
1	(Greece) Eleni Daniilidou	6	6
(Georgia (country)) Margalita Chakhnashvili	2	1
4	(Bulgaria) Elitsa Kostova	6	1	6
6	(Spain) Beatriz García Vidagany	4	6	4

Final
1	(Greece) Eleni Daniilidou	6	6
4	(Bulgaria) Elitsa Kostova	3	2

=== Top half ===
First round
1	(Greece) E Daniilidou	7	6
(Morocco) N Lalami	5	2
(Portugal) M de Lattre	4	5
Q	(United Kingdom) S Murray	6	7
Q	(Russia) Y Buchina	6	6
(Spain) A Fernández Rabener	2	3
(Venezuela) A Gámiz	4	0
8	(Spain) E Cabeza Candela	6	6
3	(China) J Lu	7	6^{3}	6
(France) I Pavlovic	6^{5}	7	4
(Portugal) MJ Koehler	6	7
WC	(Ukraine) Y Kryvoruchko	2	5
(Georgia (country)) S Shapatava	3	6	3
(France) V Larrière	6	4	6
(Georgia (country)) M Chakhnashvili	3	6	6
7	(United Kingdom) N Broady	6	1	2

Second round
1	(Greece) E Daniilidou	7	6
Q	(United Kingdom) S Murray	5	1
Q	(Russia) Y Buchina	6	6
8	(Spain) E Cabeza Candela	1	4
3	(China) J Lu	6	1	6
(Portugal) MJ Koehler	2	6	1
(France) V Larrière	4	4
(Georgia (country)) M Chakhnashvili	6	6

Quarterfinals
1	(Greece) E Daniilidou	6	6
Q	(Russia) Y Buchina	2	4
3	(China) J Lu	4	6^{7}
(Georgia (country)) M Chakhnashvili	6	7

Semifinals
(Greece) E Daniilidou	6	6
(Georgia (country)) M Chakhnashvili	2	1

=== Bottom half ===
First round
5	(Israel) J Glushko	2	6	7
(Australia) J Konta	6	4	6^{4}
LL	(United States) T Kinard	6^{2}	6	1
Q	(Spain) I Rapisarda Calvo	7	1	6
(Greece) D Papamichail	6	6
(Puerto Rico) M Puig	3	3
(Argentina) V Furlanetto	1	2
4	(Bulgaria) E Kostova	6	6
6	(Spain) B García Vidagany	7	3	4
WC	(Spain) L Cervera Vázquez	6^{4}	6	0^{r}
Q	(Russia) M Melnikova	6	6
WC	(Spain) N Párrizas Díaz	0	3
(Australia) J Moore	2	6	7
(Argentina) A Salut	6	2	5
WC	(Spain) G Muguruza	4	3
2	(Russia) N Bratchikova	6	6

Second round
5	(Israel) J Glushko	6	7
Q	(Spain) I Rapisarda Calvo	2	6^{1}
(Greece) D Papamichail	5	1
4	(Bulgaria) E Kostova	7	6
6	(Spain) B García Vidagany	7	7
Q	(Russia) M Melnikova	6^{5}	5
(Australia) J Moore	2	2
2	(Russia) N Bratchikova	6	6

Quarterfinals
5	(Israel) J Glushko	3	6	5
4	(Bulgaria) E Kostova	6	4	7
6	(Spain) B García Vidagany	7	6
2	(Russia) N Bratchikova	5	0

Semifinals
4	(Bulgaria) E Kostova	6	1	6
6	(Spain) B García Vidagany	4	6	4
