= 2012 Open Diputación Ciudad de Pozoblanco – Doubles =

Doubles
- 2012 Open Diputación Ciudad de Pozoblanco

Final
- Champions: (Russia) Konstantin Kravchuk; (Ukraine) Denys Molchanov
- Runners-up: (France) Adrian Mannarino; (France) Maxime Teixeira
- Score: 6–3, 6–3

Events
Singles	Doubles
← 2011 ·	Open Diputación Ciudad de Pozoblanco	· 2021 →

Mikhail Elgin and Alexander Kudryavtsev were the defending champions, but decided not to participate.
Konstantin Kravchuk and Denys Molchanov won the title, defeating Adrian Mannarino and Maxime Teixeira 6–3, 6–3 in the final.

== Seeds ==
1. (United Kingdom) Jamie Delgado / (United Kingdom) Ken Skupski (semifinals)
2. (France) Olivier Charroin / (France) Kenny de Schepper (first round)
3. (Russia) Konstantin Kravchuk / (Ukraine) Denys Molchanov (champions)
4. (Spain) Adrián Menéndez Maceiras / (Spain) Iván Navarro (semifinals)

== Draw ==
=== Key ===
- Q = Qualifier
- WC = Wild card
- LL = Lucky loser
- Alt = Alternate
- SE = Special exempt
- PR = Protected ranking
- ITF = ITF entry
- JE = Junior exempt
- w/o = Walkover
- r = Retired
- d = Defaulted
- SR = Special ranking

=== Draw ===
First round

Quarterfinals

Semifinals

Final

1
- (United Kingdom) J Delgado
- (United Kingdom) K Skupski
6
6

(Spain) A Brugués Davi
(Argentina) Nicolás Pastor
2
3

1
- (United Kingdom) J Delgado
- (United Kingdom) K Skupski
7
6

WC
- (Portugal) F Gil
- (Portugal) B Mota
6
4
[10]

WC
- (Portugal) F Gil
- (Portugal) B Mota
5
2

WC
(Spain) Agustín Boje-Ordóñez
(Spain) Juan José Leal-Gómez
3
6
[4]

1
- (United Kingdom) J Delgado
- (United Kingdom) K Skupski
6^{3}
6^{5}

3
- (Russia) K Kravchuk
- (Ukraine) D Molchanov
4
6
[10]

3
- (Russia) K Kravchuk
- (Ukraine) D Molchanov
7^{7}
7^{7}

- (France) Charles-Antoine Brézac
- (France) M Rodrigues
6
4
[4]

3
- (Russia) K Kravchuk
- (Ukraine) D Molchanov
6
6

- (Russia) E Donskoy
- (Ukraine) I Marchenko
7
6

- (Russia) E Donskoy
- (Ukraine) I Marchenko
1
3

- (Republic of Ireland) James Cluskey
- (France) F Martin
5
4

3
- (Russia) K Kravchuk
- (Ukraine) D Molchanov
6
6

(Spain) Iván Arenas-Gualda
(Spain) Jaime Pulgar-García
6^{5}
1

- (France) A Mannarino
- (France) M Teixeira
3
3

- (Italy) T Fabbiano
- (Italy) L Vanni
7^{7}
6

- (Italy) T Fabbiano
- (Italy) L Vanni

(Italy) R Ghedin
(Australia) Chris Letcher
4
4

4
- (Spain) A Menéndez Maceiras
- (Spain) I Navarro
w/o

4
- (Spain) A Menéndez Maceiras
- (Spain) I Navarro
6
6

4
- (Spain) A Menéndez Maceiras
- (Spain) I Navarro
4
6^{4}

WC
- (Spain) Jordi Marse-Vidri
- (Spain) C Poch-Gradin
6
6

- (France) A Mannarino
- (France) M Teixeira
6
7^{7}

Alt
(Spain) Narcis Pelach Torres
(Spain) Israel Sevilla
3
4

WC
- (Spain) J Marse-Vidri
- (Spain) C Poch-Gradin
6
1
[7]

- (France) A Mannarino
- (France) M Teixeira
6
6

- (France) A Mannarino
- (France) M Teixeira
3
6
[10]

2
- (France) O Charroin
- (France) K de Schepper
4
2
