= 2011 Open Diputación Ciudad de Pozoblanco – Women's doubles =

Women's doubles
- 2011 Open Diputación Ciudad de Pozoblanco

Final
- Champion: (Russia) Nina Bratchikova (France) Irena Pavlovic
- Runner-up: (Russia) Marina Melnikova (Georgia (country)) Sofia Shapatava
- Score: 6–2, 6–4

Events
Singles	men	women
Doubles	men	women
← 2010 ·	Open Diputación Ciudad de Pozoblanco

Akiko Yonemura and Tomoko Yonemura were the defending champions, but both chose not to participate.

Nina Bratchikova and Irena Pavlovic won the title, defeating Marina Melnikova and Sofia Shapatava in the final, 6–2, 6–4.

== Seeds ==
1. (Russia) Nina Bratchikova / (France) Irena Pavlovic (champions)
2. (Georgia (country)) Margalita Chakhnashvili / (Bulgaria) Elitsa Kostova (quarterfinals)
3. (Russia) Alexandra Panova / (Russia) Olga Panova (quarterfinals; retired)
4. (Spain) Arabela Fernández Rabener / (China) Lu Jingjing (quarterfinals)

== Draw ==
=== Key ===
- Q = Qualifier
- WC = Wild card
- LL = Lucky loser
- Alt = Alternate
- SE = Special exempt
- PR = Protected ranking
- ITF = ITF entry
- JE = Junior exempt
- w/o = Walkover
- r = Retired
- d = Defaulted
- SR = Special ranking

First round
WC	(Venezuela) M Giral Lores (Canada) D Vanko	3	5
(Portugal) M de Lattre (France) V Larrière	6	7
(Venezuela) A Gámiz (Greece) D Papamichail	6	6
(Australia) J Konta (Ukraine) Y Kryvoruchko	4	3
(Russia) M Melnikova (Georgia (country)) S Shapatava	6	7^{7}
(India) S Balu (Czech Republic) N Fraňková	1	6^{1}
(Argentina) V Furlanetto (Argentina) A Salut	6^{2}	3
4	(Spain) A Fernández Rabener (China) J Lu	7^{7}	6
(Portugal) MJ Koehler (Morocco) N Lalami	7^{8}	7
(United Kingdom) N Broady (Israel) J Glushko	6^{7}	5

Quarterfinals
1	(Russia) N Bratchikova (France) I Pavlovic	6	6
(Portugal) M de Lattre (France) V Larrère	2	4
3	(Russia) A Panova (Russia) O Panova	3	3^{r}
(Venezuela) A Gámiz (Greece) D Papamichail	6	1
(Russia) M Melnikova (Georgia (country)) S Shapatava	3	6	[10]
4	(Spain) A Fernández Rabener (China) J Lu	6	0	[4]
(Portugal) MJ Koehler (Morocco) N Lalami	6	6
2	(Georgia (country)) M Chakhnashvili (Bulgaria) E Kostova	4	4

Semifinals
1	(Russia) N Bratchikova (France) I Pavlovic	6	6
(Venezuela) A Gámiz (Greece) D Papamichail	4	3
(Russia) M Melnikova (Georgia (country)) S Shapatava	6	6
(Portugal) MJ Koehler (Morocco) N Lalami	3	3

Final
1	(Russia) N Bratchikova (France) I Pavlovic	6	6
(Russia) M Melnikova (Georgia (country)) S Shapatava	2	4
