= 2010 Open Diputación Ciudad de Pozoblanco – Doubles =

Doubles
- 2010 Open Diputación Ciudad de Pozoblanco

Final
- Champion: (Spain) Marcel Granollers; (Spain) Gerard Granollers Pujol
- Runner-up: (United States) Brian Battistone; (Sweden) Filip Prpic
- Score: 6–4, 4–6, [10–4]

Events
Singles	Doubles
← 2009 ·	Open Diputación Ciudad de Pozoblanco	· 2011 →

Karol Beck and Jaroslav Levinský were the defending champions.
Levinský chose not to compete this year and Beck played in ATP 250 tournament in Newport instead.
Marcel Granollers and Gerard Granollers Pujol won the final against Brian Battistone and Filip Prpic 6–4, 4–6, [10–4].

== Seeds ==
1. (United Kingdom) Jamie Delgado / (Croatia) Lovro Zovko (quarterfinals)
2. (Spain) Marcel Granollers / (Spain) Gerard Granollers Pujol (champions)
3. (Australia) Sadik Kadir / (India) Purav Raja (quarterfinals)
4. (Russia) Evgeny Kirillov / (Russia) Alexander Kudryavtsev (semifinals, withdrew due to Kudryavtsev's injury)

== Main draw ==
=== Key ===
- Q = Qualifier
- WC = Wild card
- LL = Lucky loser
- Alt = Alternate
- SE = Special exempt
- PR = Protected ranking
- ITF = ITF entry
- JE = Junior exempt
- w/o = Walkover
- r = Retired
- d = Defaulted
- SR = Special ranking

=== Draw ===
First round

Quarterfinals

Semifinals

Finals

1
- (United Kingdom) J Delgado
- (Croatia) L Zovko
6
7

- (Spain) G Alcaide
- (Spain) R Ramírez Hidalgo
4
5

1
- (United Kingdom) J Delgado
- (Croatia) L Zovko
5
3

- (United States) B Battistone
- (Sweden) F Prpic
7
6

- (United States) B Battistone
- (Sweden) F Prpic
7
6

- (Belgium) R Bemelmans
- (Belgium) N Desein
5
3

- (United States) B Battistone
- (Sweden) F Prpic
6
6

3
- (Australia) S Kadir
- (India) P Raja
3
6
[10]

- (Romania) M Copil
- (Austria) N Moser
4
2

WC
- (Spain) J Leal-Gómez
- (Spain) J Valenzuela-González
6
1
[4]

3
- (Australia) S Kadir
- (India) P Raja
6
6^{1}
[8]

- (Spain) R Bautista Agut
- (Spain) C Poch-Gradin
3
6
[6]

- (Romania) M Copil
- (Austria) N Moser
4
7
[10]

- (Romania) M Copil
- (Austria) N Moser
6
2
[10]

- (United States) B Battistone
- (Sweden) F Prpic
4
6
[4]

- (Spain) JL Fernández-Torrico
- (Spain) J Sotillo Navarro
2
1

2
- (Spain) M Granollers
- (Spain) G Granollers Pujol
6
4
[10]

- (Russia) K Kravchuk
- (Ukraine) D Molchanov
6
6

- (Russia) K Kravchuk
- (Ukraine) D Molchanov
4
3

- (Spain) A Boje-Ordóñez
- (Spain) P Santos
7
4
[8]

4
- (Russia) E Kirillov
- (Russia) A Kudryavtsev
6
6

4
- (Russia) E Kirillov
- (Russia) A Kudryavtsev
5
6
[10]

4
- (Russia) E Kirillov
- (Russia) A Kudryavtsev
w/o

- (France) C-A Brézac
- (France) V Stouff
6
6^{7}
[11]

2
- (Spain) M Granollers
- (Spain) G Granollers Pujol

WC
- (Switzerland) G Bastl
- (Latvia) A Juška
4
7
[9]

- (France) C-A Brezac
- (France) V Stouff
4
4

- (France) D Guez
- (France) J Ouanna
1
2

2
- (Spain) M Granollers
- (Spain) G Granollers Pujol
6
6

2
- (Spain) M Granollers
- (Spain) G Granollers Pujol
6
6
