= 2023 Open de Tenis Ciudad de Pozoblanco – Doubles =

Doubles
- 2023 Open de Tenis Ciudad de Pozoblanco

Final
- Champions: (South Korea) Nam Ji-sung (South Korea) Song Min-kyu
- Runners-up: (United Kingdom) Luke Johnson (Zimbabwe) Benjamin Lock
- Score: 2–6, 6–4, [10–8]

Events
Singles	Doubles
← 2022 ·	Open de Tenis Ciudad de Pozoblanco	· 2024 →

Dan Added and Albano Olivetti were the defending champions but only Added chose to defend his title, partnering Pierre-Hugues Herbert. Added lost in the semifinals to Nam Ji-sung and Song Min-kyu.

Nam and Song won the title after defeating Luke Johnson and Benjamin Lock 2–6, 6–4, [10–8] in the final.

== Seeds ==
1. (South Korea) Nam Ji-sung / (South Korea) Song Min-kyu (champions)
2. (United Kingdom) Luke Johnson / (Zimbabwe) Benjamin Lock (final)
3. (India) Rithvik Choudary Bollipalli / (India) Arjun Kadhe (quarterfinals)
4. (Philippines) Francis Alcantara / (China) Sun Fajing (first round)

== Draw ==
=== Key ===
- Q = Qualifier
- WC = Wild card
- LL = Lucky loser
- Alt = Alternate
- ITF = ITF entry
- PR = Protected ranking
- SR = Special ranking
- SE = Special exempt
- JE = Junior exempt
- JR = Junior Accelerator Programme entrant
- CO = College Accelerator Programme entrant
- NG = Next Gen Accelerator Program entrant
- w/o = Walkover
- r = Retired
- d = Defaulted

First round
1	(South Korea) J-s Nam (South Korea) M-k Song	6	4	[11]
(Spain) A Barroso Campos (Spain) P Llamas Ruiz	3	6	[9]
(Spain) John Echeverría (Spain) I Montes de la Torres	6	7^{7}
(Israel) D Cukierman (Israel) E Leshem	2	6^{4}
3	(India) RC Bollipalli (India) A Kadhe	6	6
(France) C Bittoun Kouzmine (Colombia) A Soriano Barrera	4	4
(France) D Added (France) P-H Herbert	6	7^{7}
(Spain) D Jordà Sanchis (Latvia) R Strombachs	4	6^{2}
(Turkey) S Ağabigün (Turkey) C İlkel	4	2
Alt	(Uzbekistan) D Istomin; E Karlovskiy	6	6
WC	(Spain) D Marrero (United States) N Moreno de Alboran	6	7
4	(Philippines) FC Alcantara (China) F Sun	4	5
WC	(Lithuania) E Butvilas (Spain) Alejandro López Escribano	1	3
(Germany) D Masur (Germany) L Wessels	6	6
(United States) U Blanch (Argentina) JP Ficovich	7	4	[7]
2	(United Kingdom) L Johnson (Zimbabwe) B Lock	5	6	[10]

Quarterfinals
1	(South Korea) J-s Nam (South Korea) M-k Song	6	6
(Spain) J Echeverría (Spain) I Montes de la Torres	4	3
3	(India) RC Bollipalli (India) A Kadhe	5	2
(France) D Added (France) P-H Herbert	7	6
Alt	(Uzbekistan) D Istomin; E Karlovskiy	4	7^{7}	[10]
WC	(Spain) D Marrero (United States) N Moreno de Alboran	6	6^{5}	[12]
(Germany) D Masur (Germany) L Wessels	5	6	[8]
2	(United Kingdom) L Johnson (Zimbabwe) B Lock	7	1	[10]

Semifinals
1	(South Korea) J-s Nam (South Korea) M-k Song	7^{7}	6
(France) D Added (France) P-H Herbert	6^{5}	3
WC	(Spain) D Marrero (United States) N Moreno de Alboran	6^{8}	4
2	(United Kingdom) L Johnson (Zimbabwe) B Lock	7^{10}	6

Final
1	(South Korea) J-s Nam (South Korea) M-k Song	2	6	[10]
2	(United Kingdom) L Johnson (Zimbabwe) B Lock	6	4	[8]
