= 2023 Open de Tenis Ciudad de Pozoblanco =

- Date: 17–23 July
- Edition: 17th
- Surface: Hard
- Location: Pozoblanco, Spain

Champions

Singles
- (France) Hugo Grenier

Doubles
- (South Korea) Nam Ji-sung / (South Korea) Song Min-kyu
- Open de Tenis Ciudad de Pozoblanco

The 2023 Open de Tenis Ciudad de Pozoblanco was a professional tennis tournament played on hardcourts. It was the 17th edition of the tournament which was part of the 2023 ATP Challenger Tour. It took place in Pozoblanco, Spain between 17 and 23 July 2023.

== Singles main-draw entrants ==
=== Seeds ===
Country	Player	Rank^{1}	Seed
FRA	Hugo Grenier	129	1
USA	Nicolas Moreno de Alboran	143	2
ITA	Mattia Bellucci	160	3
USA	Emilio Nava	168	4
ESP	Pablo Llamas Ruiz	183	5
FRA	Antoine Escoffier	185	6
LTU	Ričardas Berankis	204	7
TUR	Cem İlkel	231	8

- ^{1} Rankings are as of 3 July 2023.

=== Other entrants ===
The following players received wildcards into the singles main draw:

- (Lithuania) Edas Butvilas
- (Spain) Pablo Llamas Ruiz
- (Spain) Adrián Menéndez Maceiras

The following player received entry into the singles main draw using a protected ranking:

- (France) Pierre-Hugues Herbert

The following players received entry from the qualifying draw:

- (Spain) Alberto Barroso Campos
- (Israel) Daniel Cukierman
- (Zimbabwe) Benjamin Lock
- (Spain) Iñaki Montes de la Torre
- (Poland) Filip Peliwo
- (Spain) Pedro Vives Marcos

== Champions ==
=== Singles ===
- (France) Hugo Grenier def. (Argentina) Juan Pablo Ficovich 6–7^{(4–7)}, 6–2, 7–6^{(7–3)}.

=== Doubles ===
- (South Korea) Nam Ji-sung / (South Korea) Song Min-kyu def. (United Kingdom) Luke Johnson / (Zimbabwe) Benjamin Lock 2–6, 6–4, [10–8].
