= 2009 Open Diputación Ciudad de Pozoblanco – Doubles =

Doubles
- 2009 Open Diputación Ciudad de Pozoblanco

Final
- Champions: (Slovakia) Karol Beck; (Czech Republic) Jaroslav Levinský
- Runners-up: (United Kingdom) Colin Fleming; (United Kingdom) Ken Skupski
- Score: 6–2, 6–7, [10–7]

Events
Singles	Doubles
Open Diputación Ciudad de Pozoblanco	· 2010 →

Prior to 2009, tennis players Johan Brunström and Jean-Julien Rojer were the defending champions. They chose to start in these championships and they were first seeds. However, they lost to Ruben Bemelmans and Riccardo Ghedin in the quarter final. Karol Beck and Jaroslav Levinský defeated Colin Fleming and Ken Skupski 6–2, 6–7, [10–7] in the final.

It took place in Pozoblanco, Spain between 6 and 12 July 2009.

== Seeds ==
1. (Sweden) Johan Brunström / (Netherlands Antilles) Jean-Julien Rojer (quarterfinals)
2. (Ukraine) Sergey Bubka / (Russia) Alexander Kudryavtsev (semifinals)
3. (United Kingdom) Colin Fleming / (United Kingdom) Ken Skupski
4. (Slovakia) Karol Beck / (Czech Republic) Jaroslav Levinský (champions)

== Draw ==
=== Key ===
- Q = Qualifier
- WC = Wild card
- LL = Lucky loser
- Alt = Alternate
- SE = Special exempt
- PR = Protected ranking
- ITF = ITF entry
- JE = Junior exempt
- w/o = Walkover
- r = Retired
- d = Defaulted
- SR = Special ranking

=== Draw ===
First round

Quarterfinals

Semifinals

Finals

1
- (Sweden) J Brunström
- (Netherlands Antilles) J-J Rojer
4
6
[10]

- (Netherlands) M Koning
- (Netherlands) M Middelkoop
6
2
[3]

1
- (Netherlands Antilles) J Brunström
- (Netherlands Antilles) J-J Rojer
3
4

- (Switzerland) S Bohli
- (Ukraine) D Molchanov
7
2
[5]

ALT
- (Belgium) R Bemelmans
- (Italy) R Ghedin
6
6

ALT
- (Belgium) R Bemelmans
- (Italy) R Ghedin
5
6
[10]

ALT
- (Belgium) R Bemelmans
- (Italy) R Ghedin
7
3
[8]

3
- (United Kingdom) C Fleming
- (United Kingdom) K Skupski
6
7

3
- (United Kingdom) C Fleming
- (United Kingdom) K Skupski
6^{4}
6
[10]

- (Switzerland) G Bastl
- (Czech Republic) P Šnobel
1
5

3
- (United Kingdom) C Fleming
- (United Kingdom) K Skupski
6
6

- (Switzerland) M Chiudinelli
- (Switzerland) M Lammer
7
3
[8]

- (Canada) P-L Duclos
- (Slovakia) L Lacko
4
3

- (Canada) P-L Duclos
- (Slovakia) L Lacko
6^{4}
6
[10]

3
- (United Kingdom) C Fleming
- (United Kingdom) K Skupski
6
6^{5}
[7]

WC
(Spain) J L Fernández-Torrico
(Spain) T García de Torres
1
1

4
- (Slovakia) K Beck
- (Czech Republic) J Levinský
2
7
[10]

- (Brazil) T Alves
- (Brazil) M Torres
6
6

- (Brazil) T Alves
- (Brazil) M Torres
3
2

- (Spain) MÁ López Jaén
- (Spain) I Navarro
6
6^{5}
[5]

4
- (Slovakia) K Beck
- (Czech Republic) J Levinský
6
6

4
- (Slovakia) K Beck
- (Czech Republic) J Levinský
4
7
[10]

4
- (Slovakia) K Beck
- (Czech Republic) J Levinský
6
6

- (Argentina) B Dabul
- (Spain) F Vicente
3
6
[10]

2
- (Ukraine) S Bubka
- (Russia) A Kudryavtsev
1
2

- (Russia) I Belyaev
- (Algeria) L Ouahab
6
3
[4]

- (Argentina) B Dabul
- (Spain) F Vicente
3
1

WC
(Spain) J J Leal-Gómez
(Spain) J Sotillos
1
2

2
- (Ukraine) S Bubka
- (Russia) A Kudryavtsev
6
6

2
- (Ukraine) S Bubka
- (Russia) A Kudryavtsev
6
6
