= 2009 Open Diputación Ciudad de Pozoblanco – Singles =

Singles
- 2009 Open Diputación Ciudad de Pozoblanco

Final
- Champion: (Slovakia) Karol Beck
- Runner-up: (Brazil) Thiago Alves
- Score: 6–4, 6–3

Events
Singles	Doubles
Open Diputación Ciudad de Pozoblanco	· 2010 →

Iván Navarro was the defender of championship title, but he lost to Marco Chiudinelli in the quarterfinal.
Karol Beck won in the final 6–4, 6–3, against Thiago Alves.

It took place in Pozoblanco, Spain between 6 and 12 July 2009.

== Seeds ==
1. (Spain) Iván Navarro (quarterfinals)
2. (Argentina) Brian Dabul (second round)
3. (Spain) Marcel Granollers (quarterfinals)
4. (Brazil) Thiago Alves (final)
5. (France) Adrian Mannarino (first round)
6. (Algeria) Lamine Ouahab (second round, retired due to a headache)
7. (Slovakia) Karol Beck (champion)
8. (Slovakia) Dominik Hrbatý (first round)

== Draw ==
=== Key ===
- Q = Qualifier
- WC = Wild card
- LL = Lucky loser
- Alt = Alternate
- SE = Special exempt
- PR = Protected ranking
- ITF = ITF entry
- JE = Junior exempt
- w/o = Walkover
- r = Retired
- d = Defaulted
- SR = Special ranking

=== Final four ===
Semifinals
(Switzerland) Marco Chiudinelli	6^{8}	7	4
7	(Slovakia) Karol Beck	7	6^{6}	6
4	(Brazil) Thiago Alves	6	7
(Switzerland) Stéphane Bohli	4	6^{2}

Final
7	(Slovakia) Karol Beck	6	6
4	(Brazil) Thiago Alves	4	3

=== Top half ===
First round
1	(Spain) I Navarro	6	6
(United Kingdom) J Ward	4	2
(Russia) A Kudryavtsev	6	7
Q	(Russia) I Belyaev	4	5
(Canada) P-L Duclos	4	4
(Belgium) R Bemelmans	6	6
(Switzerland) M Chiudinelli	6	6
8	(Slovakia) D Hrbatý	4	3
3	(Spain) M Granollers	6	7
(Netherlands) M Koning	4	5
Q	(Australia) B Klein	4	2
(Spain) F Vicente	6	6
(Spain) MÁ López Jaén	7	4	3
Q	(France) L Walter	6^{3}	6	6
Q	(France) J-N Insausti	1	3
7	(Slovakia) K Beck	6	6

Second round
1	(Spain) I Navarro	7	6
(Russia) A Kudryavtsev	5	2
(Belgium) R Bemelmans	3	6	1
(Switzerland) M Chiudinelli	6	3	6
3	(Spain) M Granollers	6	6
(Spain) F Vicente	1	1
Q	(France) L Walter	2	5
7	(Slovakia) K Beck	6	7

Quarterfinals
1	(Spain) I Navarro	6^{5}	2
(Switzerland) M Chiudinelli	7	6
3	(Spain) M Granollers	6	3	3
7	(Slovakia) K Beck	3	6	6

Semifinals
(Switzerland) M Chiudinelli	6^{8}	7	4
7	(Slovakia) K Beck	7	6^{6}	6

=== Bottom half ===
First round
6/WC	(Algeria) L Ouahab	2	6	6
(Ukraine) I Marchenko	6	3	3
(Italy) R Ghedin	6^{2}	3
WC	(Spain) S Diez	7	6
(Czech Republic) P Šnobel	6^{7}	6	1
(Netherlands) M Middelkoop	7	4	6
(Switzerland) G Bastl	6	4	4
4	(Brazil) T Alves	3	6	6
5	(France) A Mannarino	6	0	3
(Switzerland) M Lammer	2	6	6
WC	(Spain) J J Leal-Gómez	1	1
(Slovakia) L Lacko	6	6
(Switzerland) S Bohli	6^{7}	7	6
WC	(Spain) A Menéndez-Maceiras	7	6^{4}	4
(Ukraine) S Bubka	6^{2}	2
2	(Argentina) B Dabul	7	6

Second round
6/WC	(Algeria) L Ouahab	6^{3}	1	r
WC	(Spain) S Diez	7	4
(Netherlands) M Middelkoop	2	6	1
4	(Brazil) T Alves	6	2	6
(Switzerland) M Lammer	2	2
(Slovakia) L Lacko	6	6
(Switzerland) S Bohli	7	6
2	(Argentina) B Dabul	6^{4}	3

Quarterfinals
WC	(Spain) S Diez	3	4
4	(Brazil) T Alves	6	6
(Slovakia) L Lacko	5	3
(Switzerland) S Bohli	7	6

Semifinals
4	(Brazil) T Alves	6	7
(Switzerland) S Bohli	4	6^{2}
