= 2024 Open de Vendée – Doubles =

Doubles
- 2024 Open de Vendée

Final
- Champions: (Brazil) Marcelo Demoliner (United States) Christian Harrison
- Runners-up: (Denmark) August Holmgren (Denmark) Johannes Ingildsen
- Score: 6–3, 7–5

Events
Singles	Doubles
- Open de Vendée

Julian Cash and Robert Galloway were the defending champions but chose not to defend their title.

Marcelo Demoliner and Christian Harrison won the title after defeating August Holmgren and Johannes Ingildsen 6–3, 7–5 in the final.

== Seeds ==
1. (Colombia) Nicolás Barrientos / (Tunisia) Skander Mansouri (first round)
2. (Netherlands) Robin Haase / (Austria) Lucas Miedler (quarterfinals)
3. (France) Manuel Guinard / (France) Grégoire Jacq (quarterfinals)
4. (Germany) Jakob Schnaitter / (Germany) Mark Wallner (semifinals)

== Draw ==
Key

- Q = Qualifier
- WC = Wild card
- LL = Lucky loser
- Alt = Alternate
- ITF = ITF entry
- PR = Protected ranking
- SR = Special ranking
- SE = Special exempt
- JE = Junior exempt
- JR = Junior Accelerator Programme entrant
- CO = College Accelerator Programme entrant
- NG = Next Gen Accelerator Program entrant
- w/o = Walkover
- r = Retired
- d = Defaulted

=== Draw ===
First round
1	(Colombia) N Barrientos (Tunisia) S Mansouri	4	6	[7]
(Denmark) A Holmgren (Denmark) J Ingildsen	6	3	[10]
(United Kingdom) D Stevenson (United Kingdom) M Willis	6	6
(France) M Janvier; A Vatutin	3	4
3	(France) M Guinard (France) G Jacq	6	6
(France) J Eysseric (France) A Reymond	4	3
(France) G Blancaneaux (France) C Hemery	w/o
(France) A Escoffier (Germany) D Masur
WC	(France) Axel Garcian (France) H Mayot	4	6	[7]
(France) G Debru (France) M Martineau	6	4	[10]
(France) C Chidekh (France) L Sanchez	4	3
4	(Germany) J Schnaitter (Germany) M Wallner	6	6
(United Kingdom) C Broom (Netherlands) M Hermans	3	3
(Brazil) M Demoliner (United States) C Harrison	6	6
WC	(France) L Poullain (France) Alexandre Reco	2	1
2	(Netherlands) R Haase (Austria) L Miedler	6	6

Quarterfinals
(Denmark) A Holmgren (Denmark) J Ingildsen	6^{5}	7^{7}	[10]
(United Kingdom) D Stevenson (United Kingdom) M Willis	7^{7}	6^{3}	[4]
3	(France) M Guinard (France) G Jacq	4	6	[12]
(France) G Blancaneaux (France) C Hemery	6	2	[14]
(France) G Debru (France) M Martineau	7	6^{1}	[7]
4	(Germany) J Schnaitter (Germany) M Wallner	5	7^{7}	[10]
(Brazil) M Demoliner (United States) C Harrison	6	5	[11]
2	(Netherlands) R Haase (Austria) L Miedler	3	7	[9]

Semifinals
(Denmark) A Holmgren (Denmark) J Ingildsen	6^{5}	6	[10]
(France) G Blancaneaux (France) C Hemery	7^{7}	3	[5]
4	(Germany) J Schnaitter (Germany) M Wallner	6^{4}	4
(Brazil) M Demoliner (United States) C Harrison	7^{7}	6

Final
(Denmark) A Holmgren (Denmark) J Ingildsen	3	5
(Brazil) M Demoliner (United States) C Harrison	6	7
