= 2021 Open de Tenis Ciudad de Pozoblanco – Singles =

Singles
- 2021 Open de Tenis Ciudad de Pozoblanco

Final
- Champion: (Turkey) Altuğ Çelikbilek
- Runner-up: (Turkey) Cem İlkel
- Score: 6–1, 6–7^{(2–7)}, 6–3

Events
Singles	Doubles
← 2012 ·	Open de Tenis Ciudad de Pozoblanco	· 2022 →

Roberto Bautista Agut was the defending champion but chose not to defend his title.

Altuğ Çelikbilek won the title after defeating Cem İlkel 6–1, 6–7^{(2–7)}, 6–3 in the final.

== Seeds ==
1. (France) Benjamin Bonzi (second round)
2. (France) Grégoire Barrère (semifinals, retired)
3. (Turkey) Altuğ Çelikbilek (champion)
4. (Turkey) Cem İlkel (final)
5. (France) Maxime Janvier (second round)
6. (Croatia) Borna Gojo (first round)
7. (Germany) Yannick Maden (first round)
8. (Spain) Nicola Kuhn (first round, retired)

== Draw ==
=== Key ===
- Q = Qualifier
- WC = Wild card
- LL = Lucky loser
- Alt = Alternate
- SE = Special exempt
- PR = Protected ranking
- ITF = ITF entry
- JE = Junior exempt
- w/o = Walkover
- r = Retired
- d = Defaulted
- SR = Special ranking

=== Finals ===
Semifinals
Q	(Belgium) Michael Geerts	2	7^{7}	4
4	(Turkey) Cem İlkel	6	6^{3}	6
3	(Turkey) Altuğ Çelikbilek	4	6	1
2	(France) Grégoire Barrère	6	3	1^{r}

Final
4	(Turkey) Cem İlkel	1	7^{7}	3
3	(Turkey) Altuğ Çelikbilek	6	6^{2}	6

=== Top half ===
First round
1	(France) B Bonzi	4	6	6
(Tunisia) A Dougaz	6	4	3
Q	(Belgium) M Geerts	6	6
(Japan) K Uchida	1	2
(Italy) M Viola	6	6
(Brazil) T Bellucci	1	3
Q	(United States) E Nava	6	7^{7}
7	(Germany) Y Maden	1	6^{5}
4	(Turkey) C İlkel	6	7^{7}
(Germany) J Härteis	2	6^{3}
Alt	(Spain) C Gómez-Herrera	6	3	0
(Japan) H Moriya	3	6	6
(Netherlands) T van Rijthoven	6	6^{3}	7
(Spain) R Ortega Olmedo	3	7^{7}	5
(Netherlands) I Sijsling	7	0
8	(Spain) N Kuhn	5	0^{r}

Second round
1	(France) B Bonzi	6^{3}	2
Q	(Belgium) M Geerts	7^{7}	6
(Italy) M Viola	5	6	3
Q	(United States) E Nava	7	4	6
4	(Turkey) C İlkel	6	6
(Japan) H Moriya	3	2
(Netherlands) T van Rijthoven	6	6
(Netherlands) I Sijsling	4	4

Quarterfinals
Q	(Belgium) M Geerts	7^{7}	7^{7}
Q	(United States) E Nava	6^{2}	6^{3}
4	(Turkey) C İlkel	7	7^{7}
(Netherlands) T van Rijthoven	5	6^{5}

Semifinals
Q	(Belgium) M Geerts	2	7^{7}	4
4	(Turkey) C İlkel	6	6^{3}	6

=== Bottom half ===
First round
5	(France) M Janvier	6^{3}	6	7^{14}
Q	(France) M Bourgue	7^{7}	2	6^{12}
WC	(Spain) A Barroso Campos	2	4
(Spain) A Menéndez Maceiras	6	6
Q	(France) M Martineau	4	6	4
(Russia) T Gabashvili	6	1	6
Alt	(Tunisia) S Mansouri	7^{7}	1	6^{4}
3	(Turkey) A Çelikbilek	6^{3}	6	7^{7}
6	(Croatia) B Gojo	4	6^{4}
LL	(Bolivia) F Zeballos	6	7^{7}
(Romania) FC Jianu	6	6
WC	(Spain) N Álvarez Varona	2	4
(Bulgaria) A Andreev	6	6
WC	(Spain) Blas Ruiz Romero	0	0
Alt	(France) R Roumane	6^{5}	3
2	(France) G Barrère	7^{7}	6

Second round
5	(France) M Janvier	6^{4}	3
(Spain) A Menéndez Maceiras	7^{7}	6
(Russia) T Gabashvili	7	3	4
3	(Turkey) A Çelikbilek	5	6	6
LL	(Bolivia) F Zeballos	7^{8}	6
(Romania) FC Jianu	6^{6}	4
(Bulgaria) A Andreev	3	0
2	(France) G Barrère	6	6

Quarterfinals
(Spain) A Menéndez Maceiras	3	0
3	(Turkey) A Çelikbilek	6	6
LL	(Bolivia) F Zeballos	4	3
2	(France) G Barrère	6	6

Semifinals
3	(Turkey) A Çelikbilek	4	6	1
2	(France) G Barrère	6	3	1^{r}
