= 2024 Open de Tenis Ciudad de Pozoblanco – Singles =

Singles
- 2024 Open de Tenis Ciudad de Pozoblanco

Final
- Champion: (Denmark) August Holmgren
- Runner-up: (France) Antoine Escoffier
- Score: 3–6, 6–3, 6–4

Events
Singles	Doubles
- Open de Tenis Ciudad de Pozoblanco

Hugo Grenier was the defending champion but chose not to defend his title.

August Holmgren won the title after defeating Antoine Escoffier 3–6, 6–3, 6–4 in the final.

== Seeds ==
1. (France) Antoine Escoffier (final)
2. Egor Gerasimov (semifinals)
3. (Denmark) August Holmgren (champion)
4. (France) Robin Bertrand (semifinals)
5. (Ukraine) Vadym Ursu (first round)
6. (Spain) Alberto Barroso Campos (quarterfinals)
7. (France) Alexis Gautier (first round)
8. (China) Cui Jie (first round)

== Draw ==
Key

- Q = Qualifier
- WC = Wild card
- LL = Lucky loser
- Alt = Alternate
- ITF = ITF entry
- PR = Protected ranking
- SR = Special ranking
- SE = Special exempt
- JE = Junior exempt
- JR = Junior Accelerator Programme entrant
- CO = College Accelerator Programme entrant
- NG = Next Gen Accelerator Program entrant
- w/o = Walkover
- r = Retired
- d = Defaulted

=== Finals ===
Semifinals
1	(France) Antoine Escoffier	6	6
4	(France) Robin Bertrand	1	1
3	(Denmark) August Holmgren	3	7^{7}	6
2	Egor Gerasimov	6	6^{5}	1

Final
1	(France) Antoine Escoffier	6	3	4
3	(Denmark) August Holmgren	3	6	6

=== Top half ===
First round
1	(France) A Escoffier	6	6
Q	(Spain) Iván Marrero Curbelo	4	2
Q	(Italy) Peter Buldorini	3	3
(Bulgaria) I Radulov	6	6
(Italy) Andrea Picchione	6	6
WC	(Spain) Alejandro López Escribano	2	1
Q	(Spain) A Pedrico Kravtsov	3	6^{5}
6	(Spain) A Barroso Campos	6	7^{7}
4	(France) R Bertrand	6	6
Q	(Spain) B Winter López	1	1
WC	(Spain) Miguel Cejudo	3	1
(Switzerland) L Castelnuovo	6	6
(Italy) G Piraino	2	6^{10}
(Canada) S Diez	6	7^{12}
(France) L Lokoli	6	7
7	(France) Alexis Gautier	3	5

Second round
1	(France) A Escoffier	5	6	6
(Bulgaria) I Radulov	7	4	1
(Italy) A Picchione	3	5
6	(Spain) A Barroso Campos	6	7
4	(France) R Bertrand	6	6
(Switzerland) L Castelnuovo	3	1
(Canada) S Diez	6^{3}	0^{r}
(France) L Lokoli	7^{7}	1

Quarterfinals
1	(France) A Escoffier	3	6	6
6	(Spain) A Barroso Campos	6	1	0
4	(France) R Bertrand	6	4	6
(France) L Lokoli	4	6	3

Semifinals
1	(France) A Escoffier	6	6
4	(France) R Bertrand	1	1

=== Bottom half ===
First round
8	(China) J Cui	6^{3}	3
Q	(Italy) Fabrizio Andaloro	7^{7}	6
Y Demin	6^{4}	1
(France) D Added	7^{7}	6
(United Kingdom) S Parker	7^{7}	6
(France) S Gueymard Wayenburg	6^{1}	2
(Spain) D Mérida	4	1
3	(Denmark) A Holmgren	6	6
5	(Ukraine) Vadym Ursu	4	6	5
(Spain) M Damas	6	2	7
(Spain) P Vives Marcos	6^{2}	4
PR	(France) A Reymond	7^{7}	6
(United States) U Blanch	3	1
Q	(Bulgaria) A Donski	6	6
WC	(Spain) N Álvarez Varona	5	7^{7}	1
2	E Gerasimov	7	6^{5}	6

Second round
Q	(Italy) F Andaloro	3	1
(France) D Added	6	6
(United Kingdom) S Parker	1	3
3	(Denmark) A Holmgren	6	6
(Spain) M Damas	6	6
PR	(France) A Reymond	4	4
Q	(Bulgaria) A Donski	6	3	4
2	E Gerasimov	4	6	6

Quarterfinals
(France) D Added	6^{6}	6^{3}
3	(Denmark) A Holmgren	7^{8}	7^{7}
(Spain) M Damas	5	6	6^{5}
2	E Gerasimov	7	2	7^{7}

Semifinals
3	(Denmark) A Holmgren	3	7^{7}	6
2	E Gerasimov	6	6^{5}	1
