= 2021 Open de Tenis Ciudad de Pozoblanco – Doubles =

Doubles
- 2021 Open de Tenis Ciudad de Pozoblanco

Final
- Champions: (Netherlands) Igor Sijsling (Netherlands) Tim van Rijthoven
- Runners-up: (Ecuador) Diego Hidalgo (Spain) Sergio Martos Gornés
- Score: 5–7, 7–6^{(7–4)}, [10–5]

Events
Singles	Doubles
← 2012 ·	Open de Tenis Ciudad de Pozoblanco	· 2022 →

Konstantin Kravchuk and Denys Molchanov were the defending champions but chose not to defend their title.

Igor Sijsling and Tim van Rijthoven won the title after defeating Diego Hidalgo and Sergio Martos Gornés 5–7, 7–6^{(7–4)}, [10–5] in the final.

== Seeds ==
1. (India) Jeevan Nedunchezhiyan / (India) Purav Raja (first round)
2. (Ecuador) Diego Hidalgo / (Spain) Sergio Martos Gornés (final)
3. (Russia) Teymuraz Gabashvili / (India) Arjun Kadhe (semifinals, withdrew)
4. (Spain) Carlos Gómez-Herrera / (Spain) Adrián Menéndez Maceiras (quarterfinals)

== Draw ==
=== Key ===
- Q = Qualifier
- WC = Wild card
- LL = Lucky loser
- Alt = Alternate
- SE = Special exempt
- PR = Protected ranking
- ITF = ITF entry
- JE = Junior exempt
- w/o = Walkover
- r = Retired
- d = Defaulted
- SR = Special ranking

First round
1	(India) J Nedunchezhiyan (India) P Raja	6	1	[9]
(Bulgaria) A Andreev (Romania) FC Jianu	4	6	[11]
(France) G Barrère (France) J Eysseric	6	2^{r}
(Netherlands) I Sijsling (Netherlands) T van Rijthoven	4	2
3	(Russia) T Gabashvili (India) A Kadhe	1	6	[10]
(Colombia) N Barrientos (Spain) R Ortega Olmedo	6	1	[3]
(Netherlands) M Vervoort (Bolivia) F Zeballos	7^{7}	3	[6]
(France) B Bonzi (France) M Bourgue	6^{2}	6	[10]
(Turkey) A Çelikbilek (Peru) A Merino	6	3	[5]
(Tunisia) A Dougaz (Tunisia) S Mansouri	4	6	[10]
WC	(Spain) Alejandro López Escribano (Spain) Blas Ruiz Romero	2	4
4	(Spain) C Gómez-Herrera (Spain) A Menéndez Maceiras	6	6
(Belgium) M Geerts (France) M Janvier	6	6
WC	(France) Mick Lescure (France) R Roumane	1	4
WC	(Colombia) A González (Spain) Carlos Matarredona Valor	3	1
2	(Ecuador) D Hidalgo (Spain) S Martos Gornés	6	6

Quarterfinals
(Bulgaria) A Andreev (Romania) FC Jianu	4	2
(Netherlands) I Sijsling (Netherlands) T van Rijthoven	6	6
3	(Russia) T Gabashvili (India) A Kadhe	w/o
(France) B Bonzi (France) M Bourgue
(Tunisia) A Dougaz (Tunisia) S Mansouri	7^{7}	6^{3}	[17]
4	(Spain) C Gómez-Herrera (Spain) A Menéndez Maceiras	6^{3}	7^{7}	[15]
(Belgium) M Geerts (France) M Janvier	7^{7}	5	[8]
2	(Ecuador) D Hidalgo (Spain) S Martos Gornés	6^{4}	7	[10]

Semifinals
(Netherlands) I Sijsling (Netherlands) T van Rijthoven	w/o
3	(Russia) T Gabashvili (India) A Kadhe
(Tunisia) A Dougaz (Tunisia) S Mansouri	6^{5}	7	[7]
2	(Ecuador) D Hidalgo (Spain) S Martos Gornés	7^{7}	5	[10]

Final
(Netherlands) I Sijsling (Netherlands) T van Rijthoven	5	7^{7}	[10]
2	(Ecuador) D Hidalgo (Spain) S Martos Gornés	7	6^{4}	[5]
