= 2024 Open de Tenis Ciudad de Pozoblanco – Doubles =

Doubles
- 2024 Open de Tenis Ciudad de Pozoblanco

Final
- Champions: (France) Dan Added (France) Arthur Reymond
- Runners-up: (United Kingdom) Liam Hignett (United Kingdom) James MacKinlay
- Score: 6–2, 6–4

Events
Singles	Doubles
- Open de Tenis Ciudad de Pozoblanco

Dan Added and Arthur Reymond won the title after defeating Liam Hignett and James MacKinlay 6–2, 6–4 in the final.

== Seeds ==
1. (Australia) Thomas Fancutt / (India) Divij Sharan (quarterfinals)
2. (France) Dan Added / (France) Arthur Reymond (champions)
3. (Bulgaria) Alexander Donski / (Portugal) Tiago Pereira (first round)
4. (Brazil) Luís Britto / (Israel) Roy Stepanov (semifinals)

== Draw ==
Key

- Q = Qualifier
- WC = Wild card
- LL = Lucky loser
- Alt = Alternate
- ITF = ITF entry
- PR = Protected ranking
- SR = Special ranking
- SE = Special exempt
- JE = Junior exempt
- JR = Junior Accelerator Programme entrant
- CO = College Accelerator Programme entrant
- NG = Next Gen Accelerator Program entrant
- w/o = Walkover
- r = Retired
- d = Defaulted

=== Draw ===
First round
(France) S Gueymard Wayenburg (Morocco) Imran Sibille	4	3
(United Kingdom) Liam Hignett (United Kingdom) J MacKinlay	6	6
4	(Brazil) L Britto (Israel) R Stepanov	6	6
WC	(Spain) Gabriel Elicha Navas (Spain) Alejandro López Escribano	4	2
(United Kingdom) Patrick Brady (Italy) Peter Buldorini	2	2
(Switzerland) L Castelnuovo (China) J Cui	6	6
(Italy) F Romano (Italy) Augusto Virgili	6	6
(Spain) B Pujol Navarro (Brazil) Gabriel Roveri Sidney	2	4
(Brazil) Oscar José Gutierrez (Switzerland) Noah Lopez	6	2	[10]
3	(Bulgaria) A Donski (Portugal) T Pereira	2	6	[8]
(Ecuador) P Alvarado (Spain) Iván Marrero Curbelo	3	2
(Spain) A Barroso Campos (Spain) P Vives Marcos	6	6
WC	(Spain) Miguel Cejudo (Spain) Carlos Díaz Ruiz	1	1
2	(France) D Added (France) A Reymond	6	6

Quarterfinals
1	(Australia) T Fancutt (India) D Sharan	3	6	[7]
(United Kingdom) L Hignett (United Kingdom) J MacKinlay	6	2	[10]
4	(Brazil) L Britto (Israel) R Stepanov	7	6
(Switzerland) L Castelnuovo (China) J Cui	5	1
(Italy) F Romano (Italy) A Virgili	2	2
(Brazil) OJ Gutierrez (Switzerland) N Lopez	6	6
(Spain) A Barroso Campos (Spain) P Vives Marcos	7^{7}	3	[6]
2	(France) D Added (France) A Reymond	6^{4}	6	[10]

Semifinals
(United Kingdom) L Hignett (United Kingdom) J MacKinlay	6	6
4	(Brazil) L Britto (Israel) R Stepanov	3	4
(Brazil) OJ Gutierrez (Switzerland) N Lopez	3	3
2	(France) D Added (France) A Reymond	6	6

Final
(United Kingdom) L Hignett (United Kingdom) J MacKinlay	2	4
2	(France) D Added (France) A Reymond	6	6
