= 2009 Open Diputación Ciudad de Pozoblanco =

- Date: July 6–12
- Edition: 10th
- Location: Pozoblanco, Spain

Champions

Singles
- (Slovakia) Karol Beck

Doubles
- (Slovakia) Karol Beck / (Czech Republic) Jaroslav Levinský
Open Diputación Ciudad de Pozoblanco	· 2010 →

The 2009 Open Diputación Ciudad de Pozoblanco was a professional tennis tournament played on hard court. This was the tenth edition of the tournament which was part of the Tretorn SERIE+ of the 2009 ATP Challenger Tour. It took place in Pozoblanco, Spain between 6 and 12 July 2009.

== Singles entrants ==
=== Seeds ===
Nationality	Player	Ranking*	Seeding
ESP	Iván Navarro	68	1
ARG	Brian Dabul	99	2
ESP	Marcel Granollers	111	3
BRA	Thiago Alves	118	4
FRA	Adrian Mannarino	128	5
ALG	Lamine Ouahab	135	6
SVK	Karol Beck	143	7
SVK	Dominik Hrbatý	162	8

- Rankings are as of June 29, 2009.

=== Other entrants ===
The following players received wildcards into the singles main draw:

- (Spain) Steven Diez
- (Spain) Juan José Leal-Gómez
- (Spain) Adrián Menéndez Maceiras
- (Algeria) Lamine Ouahab

The following players received entry from the qualifying draw:

- (Russia) Ilya Belyaev
- (France) Jean-Noel Insausti
- (Australia) Brydan Klein
- (France) Ludovic Walter

== Champions ==
=== Singles ===
(Slovakia) Karol Beck def. (Brazil) Thiago Alves, 6–4, 6–3

=== Doubles ===
(Slovakia) Karol Beck / (Czech Republic) Jaroslav Levinský def. (United Kingdom) Colin Fleming / (United Kingdom) Ken Skupski, 6–2, 6–7, [10–7]
