= 2024 Open de Tenis Ciudad de Pozoblanco =

- Date: 15–21 July
- Edition: 18th
- Surface: Hard
- Location: Pozoblanco, Spain

Champions

Singles
- (Denmark) August Holmgren

Doubles
- (France) Dan Added / (France) Arthur Reymond
- Open de Tenis Ciudad de Pozoblanco

The 2024 Open de Tenis Ciudad de Pozoblanco was a professional tennis tournament played on hardcourts. It was the 18th edition of the tournament which was part of the 2024 ATP Challenger Tour. It took place in Pozoblanco, Spain between 15 and 21 July 2024.

== Singles main-draw entrants ==
=== Seeds ===
| Country | Player | Rank^{1} | Seed |
|---|---|---|---|
| FRA | Antoine Escoffier | 211 | 1 |
| | Egor Gerasimov | 267 | 2 |
| DEN | August Holmgren | 291 | 3 |
| FRA | Robin Bertrand | 303 | 4 |
| UKR | Vadym Ursu | 339 | 5 |
| ESP | Alberto Barroso Campos | 345 | 6 |
| FRA | Alexis Gautier | 346 | 7 |
| CHN | Cui Jie | 350 | 8 |

- ^{1} Rankings are as of 1 July 2024.

=== Other entrants ===
The following players received wildcards into the singles main draw:

- (Spain) Nicolás Álvarez Varona
- (Spain) Miguel Cejudo
- (Spain) Alejandro López Escribano

The following player received entry into the singles main draw using a protected ranking:

- (France) Arthur Reymond

The following players received entry from the qualifying draw:

- (Italy) Fabrizio Andaloro
- (Italy) Peter Buldorini
- (Bulgaria) Alexander Donski
- (Spain) Iván Marrero Curbelo
- (Spain) Albert Pedrico Kravtsov
- (Spain) Benjamín Winter López

== Champions ==
=== Singles ===
- (Denmark) August Holmgren def. (France) Antoine Escoffier 3–6, 6–3, 6–4.

=== Doubles ===
- (France) Dan Added / (France) Arthur Reymond def. (United Kingdom) Liam Hignett / (United Kingdom) James MacKinlay 6–2, 6–4.
