= 2024 Open de Vendée =

- Date: 30 September – 6 October
- Edition: 11th
- Surface: Hard (Indoor)
- Location: Mouilleron-le-Captif, France

Champions

Singles
- (France) Lucas Pouille

Doubles
- (Brazil) Marcelo Demoliner / (United States) Christian Harrison
- Open de Vendée

The 2024 Open de Vendée was a professional tennis tournament played on hard courts. It was the 11th edition of the tournament which was part of the 2024 ATP Challenger Tour. It took place in Mouilleron-le-Captif, France between 30 September and 6 October 2024.

== Singles main-draw entrants ==
=== Seeds ===
Country	Player	Rank^{1}	Seed
FRA	Quentin Halys	99	1
FRA	Harold Mayot	115	2
FRA	Richard Gasquet	120	3
FRA	Lucas Pouille	124	4
~~GBR~~	~~Jacob Fearnley~~	~~126~~	~~5~~
SRB	Hamad Medjedovic	135	6
FRA	Grégoire Barrère	148	7
DEN	August Holmgren	167	8

- ^{1} Rankings are as of 23 September 2024.

=== Other entrants ===
The following players received wildcards into the singles main draw:

- (France) Sascha Gueymard Wayenburg
- (France) Manuel Guinard
- (France) Lucas Poullain

The following player received entry into the singles main draw as an alternate:

- (Germany) Daniel Masur

The following players received entry from the qualifying draw:

- (Georgia (country)) Nikoloz Basilashvili
- (France) Mathias Bourgue
- (Belgium) Buvaysar Gadamauri
- (France) Alexandre Reco
- (Netherlands) Jelle Sels
- Alexey Vatutin

The following players received entry as lucky losers:

- (Ivory Coast) Eliakim Coulibaly
- (France) Alexis Gautier

== Champions ==
=== Singles ===
- (France) Lucas Pouille def. (France) Quentin Halys 6–4, 6–4.

=== Doubles ===
- (Brazil) Marcelo Demoliner / (United States) Christian Harrison def. (Denmark) August Holmgren / (Denmark) Johannes Ingildsen 6–3, 7–5.
