= 2021 Open de Tenis Ciudad de Pozoblanco =

- Date: 19–25 July
- Edition: 15th
- Surface: Hard
- Location: Pozoblanco, Spain

Champions

Singles
- (Turkey) Altuğ Çelikbilek

Doubles
- (Netherlands) Igor Sijsling / (Netherlands) Tim van Rijthoven
- Open de Tenis Ciudad de Pozoblanco

The 2021 Open de Tenis Ciudad de Pozoblanco was a professional tennis tournament played on hardcourts. It was the 15th edition of the tournament which was part of the 2021 ATP Challenger Tour. It took place in Pozoblanco, Spain between 19 and 25 July 2021.

== Singles main-draw entrants ==
=== Seeds ===
Country	Player	Rank^{1}	Seed
FRA	Benjamin Bonzi	108	1
FRA	Grégoire Barrère	137	2
TUR	Altuğ Çelikbilek	199	3
TUR	Cem İlkel	204	4
FRA	Maxime Janvier	229	5
CRO	Borna Gojo	235	6
GER	Yannick Maden	241	7
ESP	Nicola Kuhn	250	8

- ^{1} Rankings are as of July 12, 2021.

=== Other entrants ===
The following players received wildcards into the singles main draw:

- (Spain) Nicolás Álvarez Varona
- (Spain) Alberto Barroso Campos
- (Spain) Blas Ruiz Romero

The following players received entry into the singles main draw as alternates:

- (Spain) Carlos Gómez-Herrera
- (Tunisia) Skander Mansouri
- (France) Rayane Roumane

The following players received entry from the qualifying draw:

- (France) Mathias Bourgue
- (Belgium) Michael Geerts
- (France) Matteo Martineau
- (United States) Emilio Nava

The following player received entry as a lucky loser:

- (Bolivia) Federico Zeballos

== Champions ==
=== Singles ===
- (Turkey) Altuğ Çelikbilek def. (Turkey) Cem İlkel 6–1, 6–7^{(2–7)}, 6–3.

=== Doubles ===
- (Netherlands) Igor Sijsling / (Netherlands) Tim van Rijthoven def. (Ecuador) Diego Hidalgo / (Spain) Sergio Martos Gornés 5–7, 7–6^{(7–4)}, [10–5].
