= 2012 Open Diputación Ciudad de Pozoblanco =

- Date: 6–12 August
- Edition: 14th
- Location: Pozoblanco, Spain

Champions

Singles
- (Spain) Roberto Bautista Agut

Doubles
- (Russia) Konstantin Kravchuk / (Ukraine) Denys Molchanov
- Open Diputación Ciudad de Pozoblanco

The 2012 Open Diputación Ciudad de Pozoblanco was a professional tennis tournament played on outdoor hard courts. It was part of the Tretorn SERIE+ of the 2012 ATP Challenger Tour. It takes place in Pozoblanco, Spain between August 6 and 12, 2012.

== Singles main-draw entrants ==
=== Seeds ===
Country	Player	Rank^{1}	Seed
ESP	Roberto Bautista Agut	111	1
POR	Frederico Gil	117	2
ESP	Daniel Muñoz de la Nava	128	3
RUS	Evgeny Donskoy	138	4
FRA	Josselin Ouanna	160	5
ESP	Javier Martí	180	6
ESP	Adrián Menéndez Maceiras	182	7
ESP	Tommy Robredo	189	8

- ^{1} Rankings are as of June 20, 2012.

=== Other entrants ===
The following players received wildcards into the singles main draw:

- (Spain) Roberto Carballes Baena
- (Portugal) Frederico Gil
- (Ukraine) Illya Marchenko
- (Spain) Tommy Robredo

The following players received entry from the qualifying draw:

- (France) Olivier Charroin
- (Italy) Riccardo Ghedin
- (Spain) Carles Poch Gradin
- (France) Matthieu Roy

== Champions ==
=== Singles ===
- (Spain) Roberto Bautista Agut def. (Spain) Arnau Brugués Davi, 6–3, 6–4

=== Doubles ===
- (Russia) Konstantin Kravchuk / (Ukraine) Denys Molchanov def. (France) Adrian Mannarino / (France) Maxime Teixeira, 6–3, 6–3
