= August Holmgren (tennis) =

Danish tennis player (born 1998)

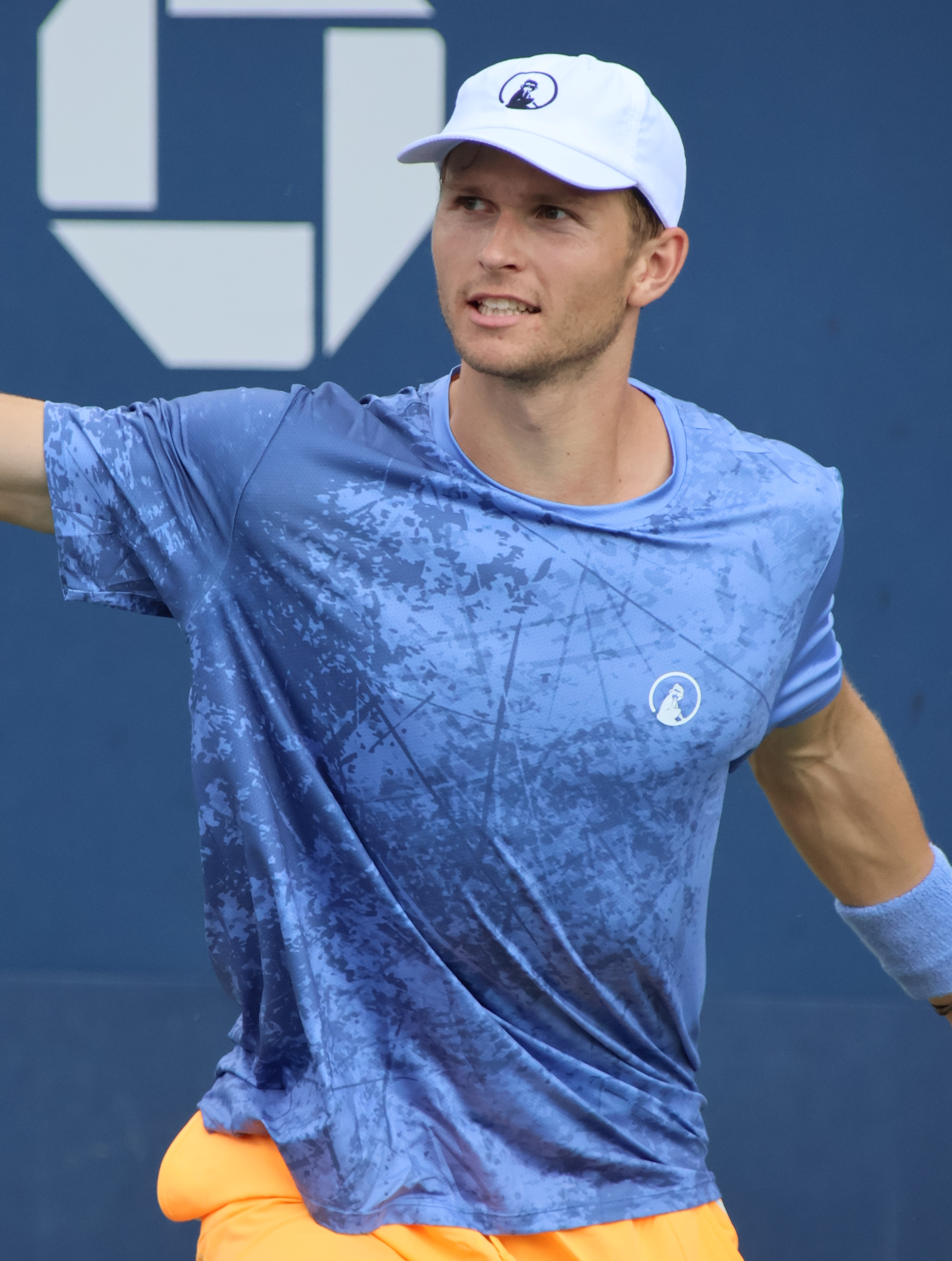
- Holmgren at the 2026 US Open
- Country (sports): Denmark
- Residence: Espergærde, Denmark
- Born: 22 April 1998 (age 28) Helsingør
- Height: 1.88 m (6 ft 2 in)
- Turned pro: 2022
- Plays: Right-handed (one-handed backhand)
- College: University of San Diego
- Coach: Jonas Svendsen, Frederik Nielsen
- Prize money: US$810,510

Singles
- Career record: 9–7
- Career titles: 0
- Highest ranking: No. 141 (22 June 2026)
- Current ranking: No. 198 (16 November 2026)

Grand Slam singles results
- Australian Open: Q2 (2025)
- French Open: Q3 (2026)
- Wimbledon: 3R (2025)
- US Open: Q1 (2025, 2026)

Doubles
- Career record: 2–1
- Career titles: 0
- Highest ranking: No. 284 (9 June 2025)
- Current ranking: No. 588 (22 June 2026)

Team competitions
- Davis Cup: 7–3
- Last updated on: 15 November 2026.

August Holmgren (born 22 April 1998) is a Danish professional tennis player. He has a career-high ATP singles ranking of world No. 141 achieved on 22 June 2026 and a doubles ranking of No. 284 achieved on 9 June 2025. He is currently the No. 2 player from Denmark.

Holmgren has represented Denmark at the Davis Cup making his debut in 2017, and has a win-loss record of 7–3.

== College ==
Holmgren played five years of college tennis for the San Diego Toreros from 2017 to 2022, receiving numerous West Coast Conference (WCC) honors. He was the nation's top-ranked player after winning the Intercollegiate Tennis Association (ITA) National Fall Championships in late 2021, and he finished his college career as the 2022 NCAA Singles Championship runner-up to Ben Shelton.

== Career ==
=== 2021-2023: ATP debut, Turned Pro ===
Holmgren made his ATP debut at the 2021 San Diego Open after receiving a lucky loser spot into the main draw after third seed Félix Auger-Aliassime withdrew. There, he lost to former world No. 3 Grigor Dimitrov in straight sets.

=== 2024: Maiden Challenger title, top 175 ===
In July 2024, Holmgren won his maiden Challenger title in Pozablanco, Spain, defeating top seed Antoine Escoffier in the final. Holmgren was the first Danish Challenger titlist since Holger Rune in 2022. Two weeks later, on 5 August 2024, he reached the top 175 in the singles rankings at world No. 167 following another Challenger title at the 2024 Porto Open.

=== 2025-2026: Major debut and third round, top 150 and Masters debuts ===
In July, Holmgren made his major debut at Wimbledon, reaching the main draw as a qualifier after wins over local player Giles Hussey, Mikhail Kukushkin, and Yosuke Watanuki, this made the first time in the major's history to have three Danish men into the main draw joining eight seed Holger Rune and compatriot Elmer Møller. In the main draw, Holmgren recorded his first major win by defeating Quentin Halys in the first round. With his second round win over 21st seed Tomáš Macháč, in five sets with a deciding fifth-set tiebreak, after nearly five hours of play, Holmgren was only the second Danish man in the Open Era to reach the third round on his major main draw debut. As a result, he moved into the top 150 in the ATP rankings. Holmgren earned a new nickname: “the King of Wimbledon Comebacks”. He lost in the third round to Alex de Minaur. Holmgren won his third Challenger title in Granby by defeating top seed Eliot Spizzirri in the semifinal and third seed Liam Draxl in the final.

In September, Holmgren also made his Masters 1000 debut as a qualifier at the 2025 Shanghai Masters.

== Personal information ==
Throughout his junior career, Holmgren was training and playing for Helsingør Tennis Klub.

== Performance timeline ==
Key
| W | F | SF | QF | #R | RR | Q# | DNQ | A | NH |

(W) winner; (F) finalist; (SF) semifinalist; (QF) quarterfinalist; (#R) rounds 4, 3, 2, 1; (RR) round-robin stage; (Q#) qualification round; (DNQ) did not qualify; (A) absent; (NH) not held; (SR) strike rate (events won / competed); (W–L) win–loss record.

=== Singles ===
| Tournament | 2025 | 2026 | SR | W–L | Win% |
|---|---|---|---|---|---|
Grand Slams
| Australian Open | Q2 | Q1 | 0 / 0 | 0–0 | – |
| French Open | Q2 | Q3 | 0 / 0 | 0–0 | – |
| Wimbledon | 3R | Q2 | 0 / 1 | 2–1 | 67% |
| US Open | Q1 | Q1 | 0 / 0 | 0–0 | – |
| Win–loss | 2–1 | 0–0 | 0 / 1 | 2–1 | 67% |
ATP Masters 1000
| Indian Wells Masters | A | A | 0 / 0 | 0–0 | – |
| Miami Open | A | A | 0 / 0 | 0–0 | – |
| Monte Carlo Masters | A | A | 0 / 0 | 0–0 | – |
| Madrid Open | A | A | 0 / 0 | 0-0 | – |
| Italian Open | A | A | 0 / 0 | 0–0 | – |
| Canadian Open | A | | 0 / 0 | 0–0 | – |
| Cincinnati Masters | A | | 0 / 0 | 0–0 | – |
| Shanghai Masters | 1R | | 0 / 1 | 0–1 | 0% |
| Paris Masters | A | | 0 / 0 | 0–0 | – |
| Win–loss | 0–1 | 0–0 | 0 / 1 | 0–1 | 0% |
| Year-end ranking | 171 | 198 | $810,510 | | |

== ATP Challenger Tour finals ==
=== Singles: 5 (4 titles, 1 runner-up) ===
| Legend ATP Challenger Tour (4–1) |

| Result | W–L | Date | Tournament | Tier | Surface | Opponent | Score |
|---|---|---|---|---|---|---|---|
| Win | 1–0 | Jul 2024 | Open Ciudad de Pozoblanco, Spain | Challenger | Hard | (France) Antoine Escoffier | 3–6, 6–3, 6–4 |
| Win | 2–0 | Aug 2024 | Porto Open, Portugal | Challenger | Hard | (Spain) Alejandro Moro Cañas | 7–6^{(7–3)}, 7–6^{(8–6)} |
| Win | 3–0 | Jul 2025 | Championnats de Granby, Canada | Challenger | Hard | (Canada) Liam Draxl | 6–3, 6–3 |
| Loss | 3–1 | Apr 2026 | Gwangju Open, South Korea | Challenger | Hard | (South Korea) Kwon Soon-woo | 4–6, 5–7 |
| Win | 4–1 | Nov 2026 | Brisbane Challenger, Australia | Challenger | Hard | (United States) Christian Langmo | 7–6^{(7–5)}, 6–2 |

=== Doubles: 4 (4 runner-ups) ===
| Legend ATP Challenger Tour (0–4) |

| Result | W–L | Date | Tournament | Tier | Surface | Partner | Opponents | Score |
|---|---|---|---|---|---|---|---|---|
| Loss | 0–1 | Sep 2024 | Istanbul Challenger, Turkey | Challenger | Hard | (Denmark) Johannes Ingildsen | (Georgia (country)) Aleksandre Bakshi (Turkey) Yankı Erel | 6–7^{(4–7)}, 5–7 |
| Loss | 0–2 | Sep 2024 | Open de Vendée, France | Challenger | Hard (i) | (Denmark) Johannes Ingildsen | (Brazil) Marcelo Demoliner (United States) Christian Harrison | 3–6, 5–7 |
| Loss | 0–3 | May 2025 | Internazionali Città di Vicenza, Italy | Challenger | Clay | (Denmark) Johannes Ingildsen | (Italy) Federico Bondioli (Italy) Stefano Travaglia | 2–6, 1–6 |
| Loss | 0–4 | Sep 2026 | Istanbul Challenger, Turkey | Challenger | Hard | (Denmark) Carl Emil Overbeck | (United States) Alafia Ayeni (United States) Keshav Chopra | 3–6, 7–6^{(7–5)}, [7–10] |

== ITF World Tennis Tour finals ==
=== Singles: 8 (4 titles, 4 runner-ups) ===
| Legend ITF WTT (4–4) | Finals by surface Hard (4–1) Clay (0–3) |

| Result | W–L | Date | Tournament | Tier | Surface | Opponent | Score |
|---|---|---|---|---|---|---|---|
| Loss | 0–1 | Aug 2019 | M15 Ystad, Sweden | WTT | Clay | (Sweden) Gustav Hansson | 6–7^{(5–7)}, 1–6 |
| Loss | 0–2 | Aug 2021 | M15 Vejle, Denmark | WTT | Clay | (Turkey) Ergi Kırkın | 6–7^{(4–7)}, 4–6 |
| Win | 1–2 | Jun 2022 | M15 Rancho Santa Fe, US | WTT | Hard | (United States) Gage Brymer | 6–4, 6–4 |
| Loss | 1–3 | Jun 2022 | M15 San Diego, US | WTT | Hard | (United States) Ethan Quinn | 6–3, 6–7^{(7–9)}, 6–7^{(4–7)} |
| Win | 2–3 | Apr 2023 | M25 Nottingham, United Kingdom | WTT | Hard | (France) Lucas Poullain | 7–6^{(7–5)}, 7–6^{(7–4)} |
| Win | 3–3 | Nov 2023 | M25 Harlingen, US | WTT | Hard | (France) Raphael Perot | 6–3, 6–7^{(5–7)}, 6–1 |
| Loss | 3–4 | Jun 2024 | M25 Aarhus, Denmark | WTT | Clay | (Denmark) Elmer Møller | 3–6, 0–6 |
| Win | 4–4 | Jul 2024 | M25 Nottingham, United Kingdom | WTT | Hard | (United Kingdom) Jack Pinnington Jones | 4–6 6–2 6–2 |

=== Doubles: 14 (8 titles, 6 runner-ups) ===
| Legend ITF WTT (8–6) | Finals by surface Hard (5–5) Clay (3–1) |

| Result | W–L | Date | Tournament | Tier | Surface | Partner | Opponents | Score |
|---|---|---|---|---|---|---|---|---|
| Win | 1–0 | Jul 2021 | M15 Monastir, Tunisia | WTT | Hard | (United States) Jacob Brumm | (Australia) Kody Pearson (Australia) Rinky Hijikata | 7–5, 7–6^{(7–5)} |
| Loss | 1–1 | Aug 2021 | M15 Monastir, Tunisia | WTT | Hard | (Denmark) Johannes Ingildsen | (Australia) Jeremy Beale (Australia) Li Tu | 4–6, 2–6 |
| Win | 2–1 | May 2022 | M15 Rancho Santa Fe, US | WTT | Hard | (Moldova) Alexander Cozbinov | (Ghana) Abraham Asaba (Australia) Mitchell Harper | 6–4, 6–7^{(3–7)}, [21–19] |
| Win | 3–1 | Aug 2022 | M25 Lesa, Italy | WTT | Clay | (Denmark) Johannes Ingildsen | (Italy) Federico Bondioli (Italy) Filippo Romano | 6–1, 6–4 |
| Loss | 3–2 | Feb 2023 | M25 Vila Real de Santo António, Portugal | WTT | Hard | (Denmark) Christian Sigsgaard | (Czech Republic) Matěj Vocel (Czech Republic) Michael Vrbenský | 4–6, 2–6 |
| Win | 4–2 | Mar 2023 | M25 Toulouse-Balma, France | WTT | Hard (i) | (Denmark) Christian Sigsgaard | (France) Adan Freire da Silva (France) Loann Massard | 6–1, 6–2 |
| Win | 5–2 | Mar 2023 | M25 Saint-Dizier, France | WTT | Hard (i) | (Denmark) Christian Sigsgaard | (Spain) David Jordà Sanchis (China) Te Rigele | 6–2, 6–3 |
| Loss | 5–3 | Apr 2023 | M25 Sharm El Sheikh, Egypt | WTT | Hard | (Moldova) Alexander Cozbinov | (Uzbekistan) Sergey Fomin; Alibek Kachmazov | 2–6, 3–6 |
| Loss | 5–4 | Apr 2023 | M25 Nottingham, United Kingdom | WTT | Hard | (Denmark) Johannes Ingildsen | (Austria) Neil Oberleitner (United Kingdom) Marcus Willis | 6–7^{(1–7)}, 3–6 |
| Loss | 5–5 | Apr 2023 | M25 Nottingham, United Kingdom | WTT | Hard | (United States) Alfredo Perez | (United Kingdom) Daniel Little (United Kingdom) Mark Whitehouse | 4–6, 6–3, [10–12] |
| Win | 6–5 | May 2023 | M25 Rome, Italy | WTT | Clay | (Austria) David Pichler | (Israel) Edan Leshem (Italy) Julian Ocleppo | 6–4, 7–5 |
| Win | 7–5 | Jun 2023 | M25 Risskov/Aarhus, Denmark | WTT | Clay | (Denmark) Christian Sigsgaard | (Peru) Gonzalo Bueno (Sweden) Jack Karlsson Wistrand | 6–4, 6–3 |
| Win | 8–5 | Mar 2024 | M25 Bakersfield, US | WTT | Hard | (United States) Nathan Ponwith | (Australia) Patrick Harper (United Kingdom) Emile Hudd | 6–1, 7-6(7–4) |
| Loss | 8–6 | Jun 2024 | M25 Aarhus, Denmark | WTT | Clay | (Denmark) Christian Sigsgaard | (Denmark) Carl Emil Overbeck (Denmark) Oskar Brostrøm Poulsen | 6–1, 7-6(7–4) |
