= 2010 Open Diputación Ciudad de Pozoblanco =

- Date: July 5–11
- Edition: 11th
- Location: Pozoblanco, Spain

Champions

Singles
- (Spain) Rubén Ramírez Hidalgo

Doubles
- (Spain) Marcel Granollers / (Spain) Gerard Granollers Pujol
← 2009 ·	Open Diputación Ciudad de Pozoblanco	· 2011 →

The 2010 Open Diputación Ciudad de Pozoblanco was a professional tennis tournament played on hard court. This was the eleventh edition of the tournament which is part of the Tretorn SERIE+ of the 2010 ATP Challenger Tour. It took place in Pozoblanco, Spain between 5 July and 11 July 2010.

== ATP entrants ==
=== Seeds ===
Nationality	Player	Ranking*	Seeding
GER	~~Rainer Schüttler~~	~~85~~	~~1~~
ESP	Marcel Granollers	87	2
ESP	Rubén Ramírez Hidalgo	107	3
SUI	Stéphane Bohli	135	4
FRA	David Guez	136	5
CZE	Jan Hernych	141	6
FRA	Josselin Ouanna	145	7
BEL	Niels Desein	183	8

- Rankings are as of June 21, 2010.

=== Other entrants ===
The following players received wildcards into the singles main draw:

- (Spain) Agustín Boje-Ordóñez
- (Spain) Pablo Carreño Busta
- (Spain) Gerard Granollers Pujol
- (Spain) Juan José Leal-Gómez

The following players received entry from the qualifying draw:

- (Switzerland) George Bastl
- (Spain) David Cañudas-Fernández
- (Spain) Marc Fornell Mestres (as a Lucky Loser)
- (Spain) Pablo Martín-Adalia
- (Austria) Nikolaus Moser

== Champions ==
=== Singles ===
(Spain) Rubén Ramírez Hidalgo def. (Spain) Roberto Bautista Agut, 7–6(6), 6–4

=== Doubles ===
(Spain) Marcel Granollers / (Spain) Gerard Granollers Pujol def. (United States) Brian Battistone / (Sweden) Filip Prpic 6–4, 4–6 [10–4]
