= Antoine Escoffier =

French tennis player (born 1992)

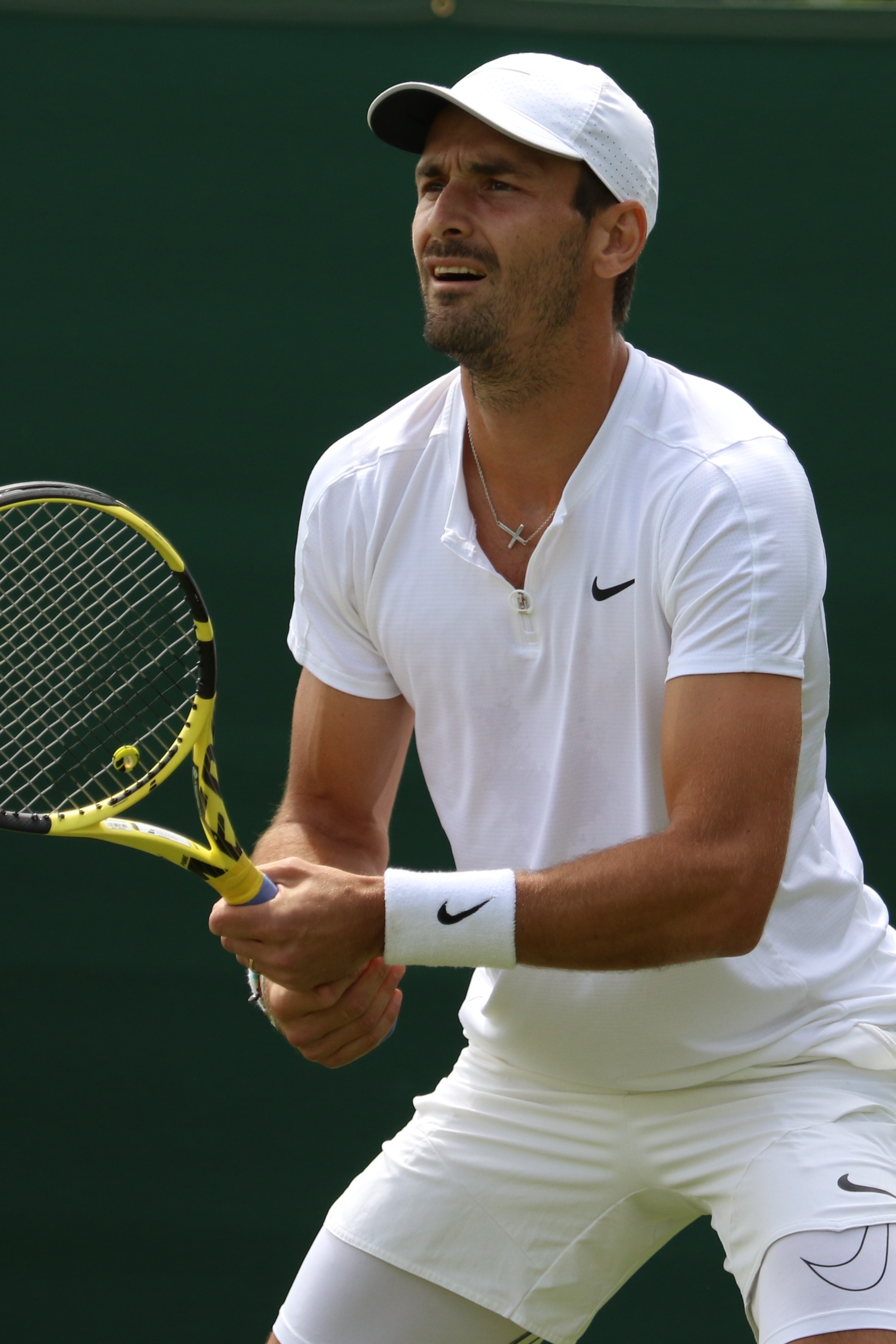
- Escoffier at the 2023 Wimbledon Championships
- Country (sports): France
- Born: 29 February 1992 (age 34) Le Pont-de-Beauvoisin, France
- Height: 1.85 m (6 ft 1 in)
- Plays: Right-handed (two-handed backhand)
- Prize money: US $ 709,804

Singles
- Career record: 0–1
- Career titles: 0
- Highest ranking: No. 135 (16 October 2023)
- Current ranking: No. 753 (13 July 2026)

Grand Slam singles results
- Australian Open: Q1 (2023, 2024, 2025)
- French Open: Q1 (2022, 2023, 2024, 2025)
- Wimbledon: Q2 (2024)
- US Open: Q3 (2024)

Doubles
- Career record: 0–0
- Career titles: 0
- Highest ranking: No. 214 (20 May 2024)
- Current ranking: —
- Last updated on: 15 July 2026.

Antoine Escoffier (born 29 February 1992) is a French professional tennis player who competed on the ATP Challenger Tour. He has a career-high ATP singles ranking of world No. 135, achieved on 16 October 2023 and a doubles ranking of No. 214, achieved on 20 May 2024. He achieved most of his career milestones after the age of 30.

== Professional career ==
=== 2015: First ITF title ===
In June 2015, Escoffier won his first ITF title in Hyderabad, India, following seven straight lost finals in the previous three years.

=== 2022: Grand Slam qualifying debut, Top 200 debut ===
In May 2022, Escoffier played his first Grand Slam qualifying match at the French Open, losing in the first round. In July 2022, Escoffier made his Top 200 debut in the ATP singles ranking.

=== 2023: First Challenger finals, Top 150 debut ===
In April 2023, Escoffier won his first ATP Challenger doubles title at the 2023 León Open partnering with Aziz Dougaz.

In July 2023, Escoffier reached his first final on the singles Challenger Tour at the 2023 Open Castilla y León in Segovia, losing to Pablo Llamas Ruiz.

=== 2024: ATP Tour debut, Maiden Challenger title ===
In January 2024, at age 31, Escoffier made his debut on the ATP Tour as a qualifier at the 2024 Open Sud de France in Montpellier, France, losing to seventh seed Alexandre Müller in the first round.

In June, Escoffier won his first grand slam qualifying match by reaching the second round at the Wimbledon qualifying, having lost in the first round in his prior nine attempts.

In July, Escoffier reached his second career Challenger final in Pozablanco, Spain, losing to August Holmgren in the final. The following week, he won his maiden Challenger title in Segovia, Spain as the top seed, defeating qualifier Alex Martinez in the final. At 32 years and four months, Escoffier became the second oldest player to win a maiden Challenger title.

== Performance timeline ==
Key
W	F	SF	QF	#R	RR	Q#	DNQ	A	NH

(W) winner; (F) finalist; (SF) semifinalist; (QF) quarterfinalist; (#R) rounds 4, 3, 2, 1; (RR) round-robin stage; (Q#) qualification round; (DNQ) did not qualify; (A) absent; (NH) not held; (SR) strike rate (events won / competed); (W–L) win–loss record.

=== Singles ===
Tournament	2022	2023	2024	2025	2026	SR	W–L	Win%
Grand Slam tournaments
Australian Open	A	Q1	Q1	Q1	A	0 / 0	0–0	–
French Open	Q1	Q1	Q1	Q1	A	0 / 0	0–0	–
Wimbledon	Q1	Q1	Q2	Q1	A	0 / 0	0–0	–
US Open	Q1	Q1	Q3	A	A	0 / 0	0–0	–
Win–loss	0–0	0–0	0–0	0–0	0–0	0 / 0	0–0	–

== ATP Challenger Tour finals ==
=== Singles: 3 (1 title, 2 runner-ups) ===
Legend ATP Challenger (1–2)	Finals by surface Hard (1–2) Clay (0–0)

Result	W–L	Date	Tournament	Tier	Surface	Opponent	Score
Loss	0–1	Jul 2023	Open Castilla y León, Spain	Challenger	Hard	(Spain) Pablo Llamas Ruiz	6–7^{(9–11)}, 6–7^{(5–7)}
Loss	0–2	Jul 2024	Open de Tenis Pozoblanco, Spain	Challenger	Hard	(Denmark) August Holmgren	6–3, 3–6, 4–6
Win	1–2	Jul 2024	Open Castilla y León, Spain	Challenger	Hard	(Spain) Àlex Martínez	6–3, 2–6, 6–3

=== Doubles: 5 (2 title, 3 runner-ups) ===
Legend ATP Challenger Tour (2–3)	Finals by surface Hard (2–3) Clay (0–0)

Result	W–L	Date	Tournament	Tier	Surface	Partner	Opponents	Score
Win	1–0	Apr 2023	León Open, Mexico	Challenger	Hard	(Tunisia) Aziz Dougaz	(Austria) Maximilian Neuchrist (Greece) Michail Pervolarakis	7–6^{(7–5)}, 3–6, [10–5]
Loss	1–1	Sep 2023	Open de Rennes, France	Challenger	Hard (i)	(India) Niki Kaliyanda Poonacha	(Netherlands) Sander Arends (Netherlands) David Pel	3–6, 2–6
Loss	1–2	Feb 2024	Nottingham Challenger, United Kingdom	Challenger	Hard (i)	(United Kingdom) Joshua Paris	(Czech Republic) Petr Nouza (Czech Republic) Patrik Rikl	3–6, 6–7^{(3–7)}
Loss	1–3	Sep 2024	Open de Rennes, France	Challenger	Hard (i)	(United Kingdom) Joshua Paris	(Netherlands) Sander Arends (France) Grégoire Jacq	4–6, 2–6
Win	2–3	May 2025	Little Rock, United States	Challenger	Hard	(Tunisia) Aziz Dougaz	(Ecuador) Andrés Andrade (Colombia) Nicolas Mejia	6–2, 6–3

== ITF Futures/World Tennis Tour finals ==
=== Singles: 28 (16 titles, 12 runner-ups) ===
Legend ITF Futures/WTT (16–12)	Finals by surface Hard (16–8) Clay (0–4)

Result	W–L	Date	Tournament	Tier	Surface	Opponent	Score
Loss	0–1	May 2012	Saudi Arabia F1, Saudi Arabia	Futures	Hard	(France) Jules Marie	1–6, 6–7^{(7–9)}
Loss	0–2	May 2012	Thailand F1, Thailand	Futures	Hard	(Australia) Luke Saville	6–2, 4–6, 0–6
Loss	0–3	May 2012	Thailand F3, Thailand	Futures	Hard	(Indonesia) Christopher Rungkat	2–6, 2–6
Loss	0–4	Jul 2012	India F12, India	Futures	Hard	(India) Saketh Myneni	3–6, 2–6
Loss	0–5	Nov 2014	Spain F22, Spain	Futures	Clay	(Spain) Roberto Ortega Olmedo	3–6, 2–6
Loss	0–6	Nov 2014	Tunisia F8, Tunisia	Futures	Hard	(France) Yannick Jankovits	2–6, 2–6
Loss	0–7	May 2015	India F5, Mandya	Futures	Clay	(India) Karununday Singh	0–3, ret.
Win	1–7	Jun 2015	India F9, Hyderabad	Futures	Hard (i)	(India) Vishnu Vardhan	7–6^{(7–4)}, 6–2
Win	2–7	Jul 2015	India F10, Hyderabad	Futures	Hard (i)	(India) Vishnu Vardhan	6–2, 7–6^{(7–3)}
Win	3–7	Feb 2016	Israel F3, Ramat Gan	Futures	Hard	(Belgium) Julien Dubail	5–7, 6–4, 6–4
Win	4–7	Apr 2016	Spain F11, Mostoles	Futures	Hard	(Japan) Akira Santillan	6–4, 6–7^{(7–5)}, 6–3
Loss	4–8	Apr 2017	Qatar F1, Doha	Futures	Hard	(Germany) Daniel Altmaier	4–6, 3–6
Win	5–8	Apr 2017	Qatar F2, Doha	Futures	Hard	(Germany) Daniel Altmaier	6–2, 6–7^{(7–2)}, 6–4
Win	6–8	Jul 2017	Israel F12, Tel Aviv	Futures	Hard	(France) Hugo Grenier	6–7^{(4–7)}, 6–4, 4–2 ret.
Loss	6–9	Jun 2019	M15 Tabarka, Tunisia	WTT	Hard	(Argentina) Juan Manuel Cerúndolo	4–6, 6–7^{(6–8)}
Win	7–9	Aug 2019	M25 Glasgow, United Kingdom	WTT	Hard (i)	(Germany) Jeremy Jahn	6–2, 7–6^{(8–6)}
Win	8–9	Aug 2019	M15 Sintra, Portugal	WTT	Hard	(France) Lucas Poullain	7–5, 6–4
Win	9–9	Jan 2020	M15 Monastir, Tunisia	WTT	Hard	(France) Thomas Laurent	6–2, 6–0
Loss	9–10	Apr 2021	M15 Monastir, Tunisia	WTT	Hard	(Italy) Franco Agamenone	7–6^{(7–2)}, 3–6, 2–6
Loss	9–11	Jul 2021	M25 Gandia, Spain	WTT	Clay	(Spain) Javier Barranco Cosano	4–6, 2–6
Win	10–11	Sep 2021	M25 Bagnères-de-Bigorre, France	WTT	Hard (i)	(United Kingdom) Millen Hurrion	7–6^{(7–4)}, 6–0
Win	11–11	Oct 2021	M25 Rodez, France	WTT	Hard (i)	(United Kingdom) Aidan McHugh	5–7, 7–5, 6–4
Win	12–11	Nov 2021	M25 Villers-lès-Nancy, France	WTT	Hard (i)	(Austria) Maximilian Neuchrist	6–4, 6–4
Win	13–11	Jan 2022	M25 Loughborough, United Kingdom	WTT	Hard (i)	(United Kingdom) Ryan Peniston	6–4, 3–6, 6–3
Loss	13–12	Apr 2022	M25 Nottingham, United Kingdom	WTT	Hard	(Japan) Hiroki Moriya	6–3, 0–6, 2–6
Win	14–12	Jun 2024	M25 Setúbal, Portugal	WTT	Hard	(Switzerland) Antoine Bellier	3–6, 7–6^{(8–6)}, 6–2
Win	15–12	Jun 2024	M25 Elvas, Portugal	WTT	Hard	(Portugal) Duarte Vale	6–3, 6–2
Win	16–12	Jul 2025	M25 Ajaccio, France	WTT	Hard	(France) Laurent Lokoli	7–6^{(7–5)}, 7–6^{(7–5)}

=== Doubles: 18 (7 titles, 11 runner-ups) ===
Legend ITF Futures (7–11)	Finals by surface Hard (6–8) Clay (1–3)

Result	W–L	Date	Tournament	Tier	Surface	Partner	Opponents	Score
Loss	0–1	Jul 2011	Romania F6, Romania	Futures	Clay	(France) Thomas Le Boulch	(Greece) Paris Gemouchidis (Greece) Alexandros Jakupovic	7-6^{(5-7)}, 3-6, [5-10]
Loss	0–2	Nov 2012	Thailand F5, Thailand	Futures	Hard	(United Kingdom) Alexander Ward	(United Kingdom) Brydan Klein (Australia) Dane Propoggia	3-6, 2-6
Loss	0–3	Nov 2012	Thailand F6, Thailand	Futures	Hard	(United Kingdom) Alexander Ward	(Australia) Ryan Agar (Austria) Sebastian Bader	6-7^{(2-7)}, 6-2, [8-10]
Loss	0–4	Oct 2014	Spain F31, Spain	Futures	Hard	(France) Matthieu Roy	(Belgium) Yannick Mertens (Spain) Roberto Ortega Olmedo	2-6, 4-6
Loss	0–5	Apr 2015	Turkey F14, Antalya	Futures	Hard	(France) Cesar Testoni	(United Kingdom) Richard Gabb (Austria) Maximilian Neuchrist	2-6, 4-6
Win	1–5	Apr 2015	Tunisia F15, Port El Kantaoui	Futures	Hard	(Republic of Ireland) Sam Barry	(France) Victor Ouvrard (Tunisia) Anis Ghorbel	6-3, 6-2
Loss	1–6	Jun 2015	India F10, Hyderabad	Futures	Clay	(France) Hugo Grenier	(India) Sriram Balaji (India) Vishnu Vardhan	4-6, 2-6
Win	2–6	Aug 2015	Gabon F1, Libreville	Futures	Hard	(Spain) Jaime Pulgar-García	(Spain) Javier Pulgar-García (United States) Cameron Silverman	7-5, 3-6, [10-8]
Win	3–6	Jan 2017	Egypt F1, Sharm El Sheikh	Futures	Hard	(France) Alexandre Müller	(Switzerland) Adrian Bodmer (Germany) Jakob Sude	6-2, 3-6, [11-9]
Win	4–6	Jun 2017	Israel F9, Kyriat Shmona	Futures	Hard	(Israel) Alon Elia	(France) Mick Lescure (France) David Guez	6-3, 7-6^{(7-5)}
Loss	4–7	Jun 2017	Israel F10, Kyriat Shmona	Futures	Hard	(France) Matthieu Roy	(Israel) Dekel Bar (Israel) Mor Bulis	5-7, 6-1, [6-10]
Loss	4–8	Jun 2017	Israel F11, Herzliya	Futures	Clay	(France) Matthieu Roy	(Israel) Dekel Bar (Israel) Mor Bulis	6-7^{(6-8)}, 2–6
Loss	4–9	Jan 2018	Turkey F2, Antalya	Futures	Hard	(Croatia) Fran Zvonimir Zgombić	(Russia) Mikhail Fufygin (Russia) Alexander Pavlioutchenkov	7–6^{(7-4)}, 3–6, [7-10]
Win	5–9	Mar 2019	M15 Toulouse, France	WTT	Hard (i)	(France) Maxime Tchoutakian	(Russia) Teymuraz Gabashvili (Kazakhstan) Denis Yevseyev	6–2, 7–5
Loss	5–10	Mar 2019	M15 Poitiers, France	WTT	Hard (i)	(France) Tony Bourcet	(France) Matteo Martineau (France) Clément Tabur	3–6, 4–6
Win	6–10	Aug 2019	M15 Sintra, Portugal	WTT	Hard	(France) Maxime Tchoutakian	(Republic of Ireland) Peter Bothwell (Brazil) Bernardo Azevedo Pereira	0–6, 6–2, [10–5]
Loss	6–11	Mar 2021	M25 Vale do Lobo, Portugal	WTT	Hard	(France) Hugo Voljacques	(France) Quentin Robert (France) Kenny de Schepper	0–6, 6–4, [6–10]
Win	7–11	Jun 2021	M25 Montauban, France	WTT	Clay	(Italy) Franco Agamenone	(France) Louis Dussin (France) Arthur Bouquier	6–1, 7–5
