= 2011 Open Diputación Ciudad de Pozoblanco =

- Date: June 27 – July 3 (women); July 4 – July 10 (men)
- Edition: 3rd (women); 13th (men)
- Location: Pozoblanco, Spain

Champions

Men's singles
- (France) Kenny de Schepper

Women's singles
- (Greece) Eleni Daniilidou

Men's doubles
- (Russia) Mikhail Elgin / (Russia) Alexander Kudryavtsev

Women's doubles
- (Russia) Nina Bratchikova / (France) Irena Pavlovic
- Open Diputación Ciudad de Pozoblanco

The 2011 Open Diputación Ciudad de Pozoblanco was a professional tennis tournament played on outdoor hard courts. It was part of the Tretorn SERIE+ of the 2011 ATP Challenger Tour and 2011 ITF Women's Circuit. It took place in Pozoblanco, Spain between June 27 and July 3, 2011, for Women's and between July 4 and July 10, 2011, for Men's.

== ATP entrants ==
=== Seeds ===
Country	Player	Rank^{1}	Seed
FRA	Adrian Mannarino	55	1
GER	Rainer Schüttler	113	2
UKR	Illya Marchenko	114	3
ESP	Rubén Ramírez Hidalgo	121	4
SVK	Lukáš Lacko	148	5
RUS	Alexander Kudryavtsev	149	6
RUS	Konstantin Kravchuk	154	7
ESP	Roberto Bautista Agut	172	8

- ^{1} Rankings are as of June 20, 2011.

=== Other entrants ===
The following players received wildcards into the singles main draw:

- (Spain) Juan José Leal-Gómez
- (Spain) Carlos Gómez-Herrera
- (Spain) Iñigo Cervantes-Huegun
- (Slovakia) Miloslav Mečíř Jr.

The following players received entry from the qualifying draw:

- (Russia) Evgeny Kirillov
- (Russia) Mikhail Ledovskikh
- (Spain) Miguel Ángel López Jaén
- (Ukraine) Denys Molchanov

== ITF entrants ==
=== Seeds ===
Nationality	Player	Ranking*	Seeding
GRE	Eleni Daniilidou	123	1
RUS	Nina Bratchikova	148	2
CHN	Lu Jingjing	181	3
BUL	Elitsa Kostova	188	4
ISR	Julia Glushko	203	5
ESP	Beatriz García Vidagany	205	6
GBR	Naomi Broady	216	7
ESP	Estrella Cabeza Candela	235	8

- Rankings are as of June 20, 2011.

=== Other entrants ===
The following players received wildcards into the singles main draw:

- (Spain) Lucía Cervera Vázquez
- (Ukraine) Yevgeniya Kryvoruchko
- (Spain) Garbiñe Muguruza
- (Spain) Nuria Párrizas Díaz

The following players received entry from the qualifying draw:

- (Russia) Yana Buchina
- (Russia) Marina Melnikova
- (United Kingdom) Samantha Murray
- (Spain) Isabel Rapisarda Calvo

The following player received entry as a lucky loser:

- (United States) Tori Kinard

== Champions ==
=== Men's singles ===
(France) Kenny de Schepper def. (Spain) Iván Navarro, 2–6, 7–5, 6–3

=== Women's singles ===
(Greece) Eleni Daniilidou def. (Bulgaria) Elitsa Kostova, 6–3, 6–2

=== Men's doubles ===
(Russia) Mikhail Elgin / (Russia) Alexander Kudryavtsev def. (Ukraine) Illya Marchenko / (Ukraine) Denys Molchanov, walkover

=== Women's doubles ===
(Russia) Nina Bratchikova / (France) Irena Pavlovic def. (Russia) Marina Melnikova / (Georgia (country)) Sofia Shapatava, 6–2, 6–4
