= Open de Tenis Ciudad de Pozoblanco =

Open Ciudad de Pozoblanco

Tournament information
- Event name: Open Ciudad de Pozoblanco
- Location: Pozoblanco, Spain
- Venue: Club Tenis Pozoblanco
- Surface: Hard
- Website: Website
ATP Tour
- Category: ATP Challenger Tour, Tretorn SERIE+
- Draw: 32S / 32Q / 16D
- Prize money: €100,000+H
WTA Tour
- Category: ITF Women's Circuit
- Draw: 32S / 32Q / 16D
- Prize money: $50,000

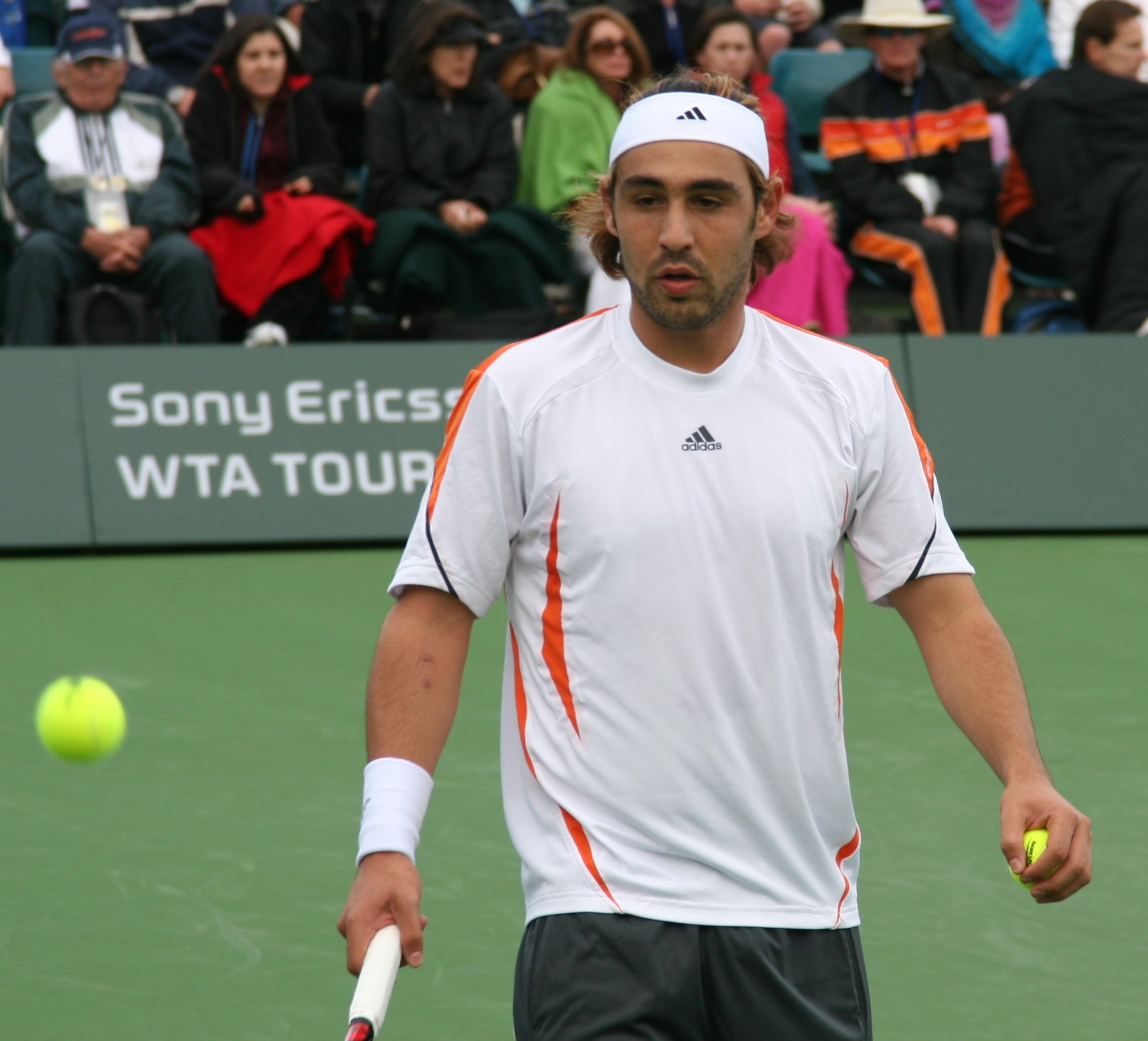
2006 Australian Open finalist Marcos Baghdatis from Cyprus won the singles title in 2005 over Alejandro Falla

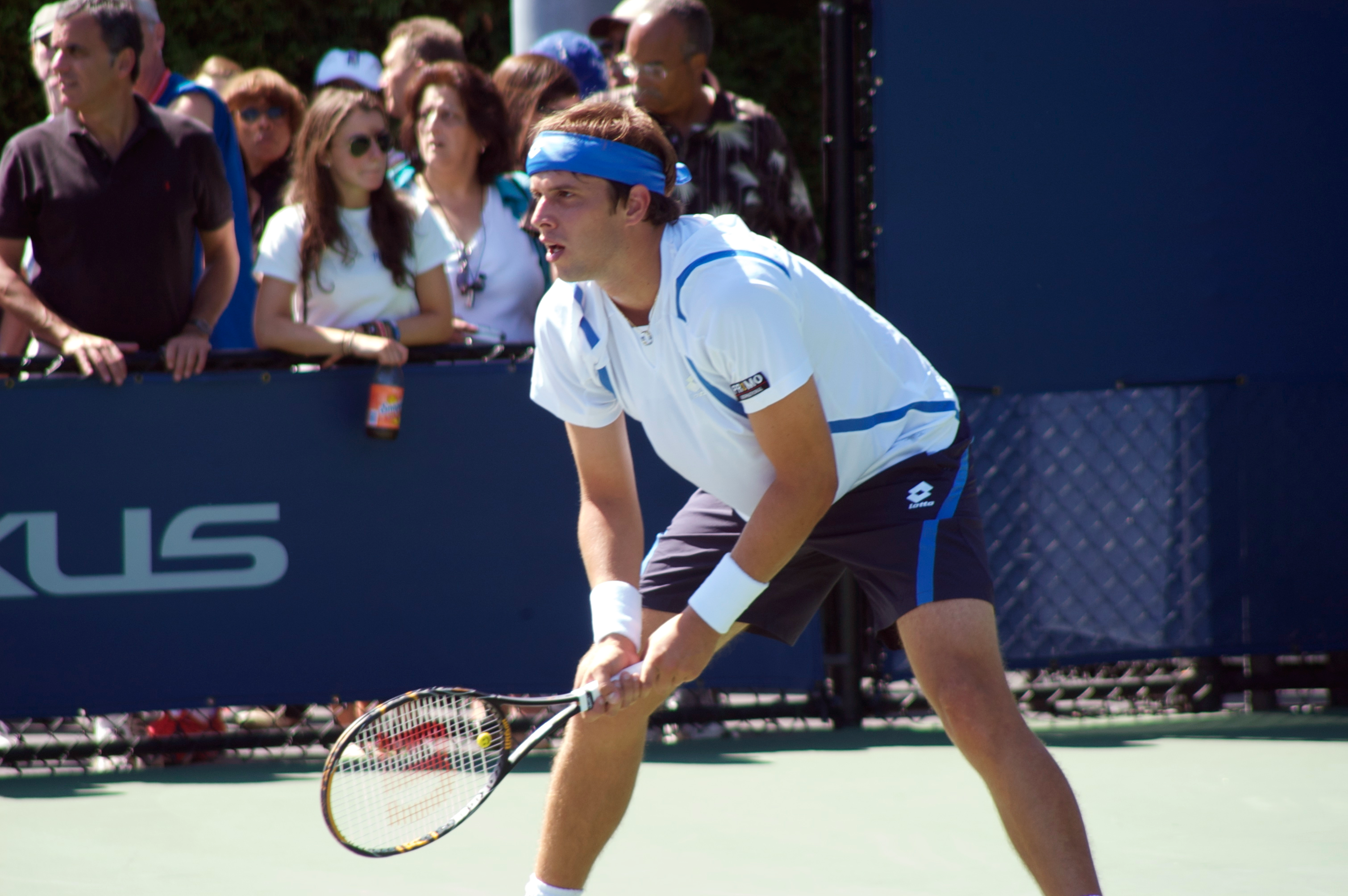
Luxembourg's Gilles Müller took the singles in 2004 over Nicolás Almagro

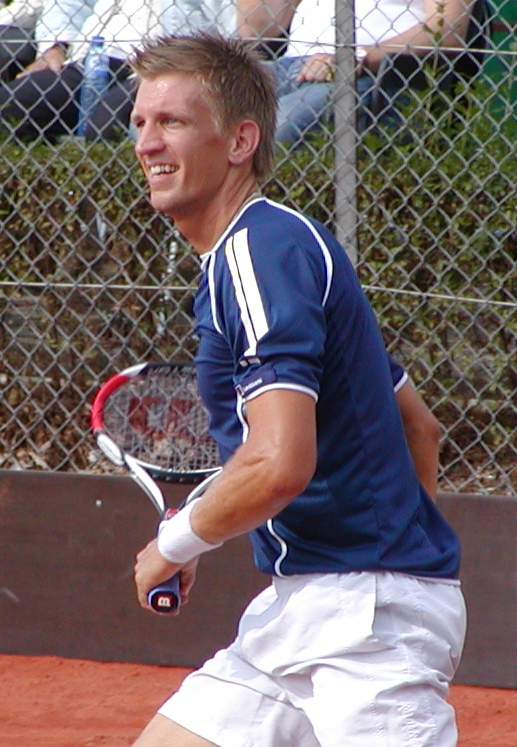
Finland's Jarkko Nieminen defeated Paul-Henri Mathieu to win the 2001 singles

The Open Ciudad de Pozoblanco is a professional tennis tournament played on outdoor hardcourts. It is part of the Association of Tennis Professionals (ATP) Challenger Tour and was part of the ITF Women's Circuit. It was held at the Club Tenis Pozoblanco in Pozoblanco, Spain from 1992 to 2014 before starting back again in 2018.

== Past finals ==
=== Key ===
Challenger
Non-Tour Event

=== Men's singles ===
Year	Champion	Runner-up	Score
↓ ATP Challenger ↓
2026	(Luxembourg) Chris Rodesch	Ilya Ivashka	6–4, 2–6, 7–6^{(7–5)}
2025	(Spain) Daniel Mérida	(China) Sun Fajing	6–3, 6–4
2024	(Denmark) August Holmgren	(France) Antoine Escoffier	3–6, 6–3, 6–4
2023	(France) Hugo Grenier	(Argentina) Juan Pablo Ficovich	6–7^{(4–7)}, 6–2, 7–6^{(7–3)}
2022	(France) Constant Lestienne	(France) Grégoire Barrère	6–0, 7–6^{(7–3)}
2021	(Turkey) Altuğ Çelikbilek	(Turkey) Cem İlkel	6–1, 6–7^{(2–7)}, 6–3
↓ ITF Futures ↓
2020	Not held due to the COVID-19 pandemic		
2019	(France) Rayane Roumane	(Russia) Konstantin Kravchuk	6–4, 7–5
2018	(France) Mick Lescure	(Spain) David Pérez Sanz	7–6^{(8–6)}, 6–2
2015–2017	Not held		
2014	(United Kingdom) Edward Corrie	(United Kingdom) Brydan Klein	6–4, 7–6^{(7–4)}
2013	(Spain) Andrés Artuñedo	(Spain) David Pérez Sanz	6–7^{(6–8)}, 6–0, 6–1
↓ ATP Challenger ↓
2012	(Spain) Roberto Bautista Agut	(Spain) Arnau Brugués Davi	6–3, 6–4
2011	(France) Kenny de Schepper	(Spain) Iván Navarro	2–6, 7–5, 6–3
2010	(Spain) Rubén Ramírez Hidalgo	(Spain) Roberto Bautista Agut	7–6(6), 6–4
2009	(Slovakia) Karol Beck	(Brazil) Thiago Alves	6–4, 6–3
2008	(Spain) Iván Navarro	(Belgium) Dick Norman	6–7(4), 6–3, 7–6(10)
2007	(Spain) Adrián Menéndez Maceiras	(Israel) Dudi Sela	6–4, 0–6, 7–5
2006	(Germany) Simon Greul	(United States) Kevin Kim	6–7(4), 6–1, 7–6(2)
2005	(Cyprus) Marcos Baghdatis	(Colombia) Alejandro Falla	6–3, 6–3
2004	(Luxembourg) Gilles Müller	(Spain) Nicolás Almagro	6–1, 6–2
2003	(Italy) Stefano Pescosolido	(France) Nicolas Mahut	6–4, 6–3
2002	(France) Jean-François Bachelot	(Italy) Cristiano Caratti	7–5, 3–6, 6–4
2001	(Finland) Jarkko Nieminen	(France) Paul-Henri Mathieu	6–4, 2–6, 6–3
2000	(Belgium) Réginald Willems	(Russia) Denis Golovanov	4–6, 7–5, 7–6(1)
1999	(Uzbekistan) Oleg Ogorodov	(Japan) Goichi Motomura	6–4, 3–6, 6–3
↓ Non-Tour Event ↓
1998	(Spain) Marcos Górriz	(Spain) Víctor Sancha	
1997	(Spain) Fermín Novillo	(Spain) Ignacio Truyol	
1996	(Spain) José Francisco Altur	(Spain) Fermín Novillo	
1995	(Spain) Miguel Valor	(Spain) Vicente Solves	
1994	(Spain) Miguel Valor	(Spain) Sergio Gómez Barrio	
1993	(Spain) Carlos Castillo	(Spain) Antonio Cañadillas	
1992	(Spain) Rafael Domínguez	(Spain) Alberto Torres	

=== Men's doubles ===
Year	Champions	Runners-up	Score
↓ ATP Challenger ↓
2026	(Spain) Alejo Sánchez Quílez (Spain) Benjamín Winter López	(Turkey) Arda Azkara (Turkey) Yankı Erel	6–2, 7–5
2025	(Spain) Iñaki Montes de la Torre (China) Sun Fajing	(Bulgaria) Anthony Genov (Israel) Roy Stepanov	6–1, 7–6^{(10–8)}
2024	(France) Dan Added (France) Arthur Reymond	(United Kingdom) Liam Hignett (United Kingdom) James MacKinlay	6–2, 6–4
2023	(South Korea) Nam Ji-sung (South Korea) Song Min-kyu	(United Kingdom) Luke Johnson (Zimbabwe) Benjamin Lock	2–6, 6–4, [10–8]
2022	(France) Dan Added (France) Albano Olivetti	(Romania) Victor Vlad Cornea (Venezuela) Luis David Martínez	3–6, 6–1, [12–10]
2021	(Netherlands) Igor Sijsling (Netherlands) Tim van Rijthoven	(Ecuador) Diego Hidalgo (Spain) Sergio Martos Gornés	5–7, 7–6^{(7–4)}, [10–5]
↓ ITF Futures ↓
2020	Not held due to the COVID-19 pandemic		
2019	(Spain) Andrés Artuñedo (Spain) Sergio Martos Gornés	(France) Mick Lescure (Colombia) Eduardo Struvay	7–6^{(7–4)}, 7–5
2018	(Spain) Andrés Artuñedo (France) Mick Lescure	(Serbia) Darko Jandrić (United Kingdom) Evan Hoyt	6–7^{(3–7)}, 6–4, [10–6]
2015–2017	Not held		
2014	(United Kingdom) Edward Corrie (United Kingdom) David Rice	(United Kingdom) Lewis Burton (United Kingdom) Marcus Willis	6–4, 7–5
2013	(Austria) Maximilian Neuchrist (Republic of Ireland) James Cluskey	(Spain) Iván Arenas Gualda (Spain) José Checa Calvo	6–3, 6–2
↓ ATP Challenger ↓
2012	(Russia) Konstantin Kravchuk (Ukraine) Denys Molchanov	(France) Adrian Mannarino (France) Maxime Teixeira	6–3, 6–3
2011	(Russia) Michail Elgin (Russia) Alexandre Kudryavtsev	(Ukraine) Illya Marchenko (Ukraine) Denys Molchanov	walkover
2010	(Spain) Marcel Granollers (Spain) Gerard Granollers-Pujol	(United States) Brian Battistone (Sweden) Filip Prpic	6–4, 4–6, 10–4
2009	(Slovakia) Karol Beck (Czech Republic) Jaroslav Levinský	(United Kingdom) Colin Fleming (United Kingdom) Ken Skupski	6–2, 6–7(5), 10–7
2008	(Sweden) Johan Brunström (Netherlands Antilles) Jean-Julien Rojer	(United States) James Cerretani (Belgium) Dick Norman	6–4, 6–3
2007	(Spain) Santiago Ventura (Spain) Fernando Vicente	(Chile) Paul Capdeville (Argentina) Leonardo Mayer	6–4, 6–3
2006	(United States) Justin Gimelstob (United States) Kevin Kim	(Czech Republic) Ivo Klec (Czech Republic) Jan Mertl	6–3, 7–5
2005	(Belarus) Vladimir Voltchkov (Ukraine) Sergiy Stakhovsky	(France) Nicolas Mahut (Luxembourg) Gilles Müller	7–5, 5–7, 6–3
2004	(United States) Brandon Coupe (United States) Tripp Phillips	(Spain) Emilio Benfele Álvarez (Brazil) Josh Goffi	7–6(6), 7–6(1)
2003	(United States) Brandon Coupe (Israel) Noam Okun	(Spain) Juan Ignacio Carrasco (Spain) Albert Portas	6–4, 1–6, 6–4
2002	(Czech Republic) Ota Fukárek (South Africa) Paul Rosner	(Spain) Emilio Benfele Álvarez (Serbia) Dušan Vemić	7–6(7), 6–4
2001	(Australia) Jordan Kerr (Australia) Grant Silcock	(Spain) Emilio Benfele Álvarez (France) Michaël Llodra	6–3, 5–7, 6–3
2000	(Australia) Dejan Petrović (Israel) Andy Ram	(Spain) Óscar Burrieza (Brazil) Daniel Melo	6–1, 6–4
1999	(Japan) Satoshi Iwabuchi (Uzbekistan) Oleg Ogorodov	(Israel) Noam Behr (Israel) Eyal Erlich	6–3, 6–2

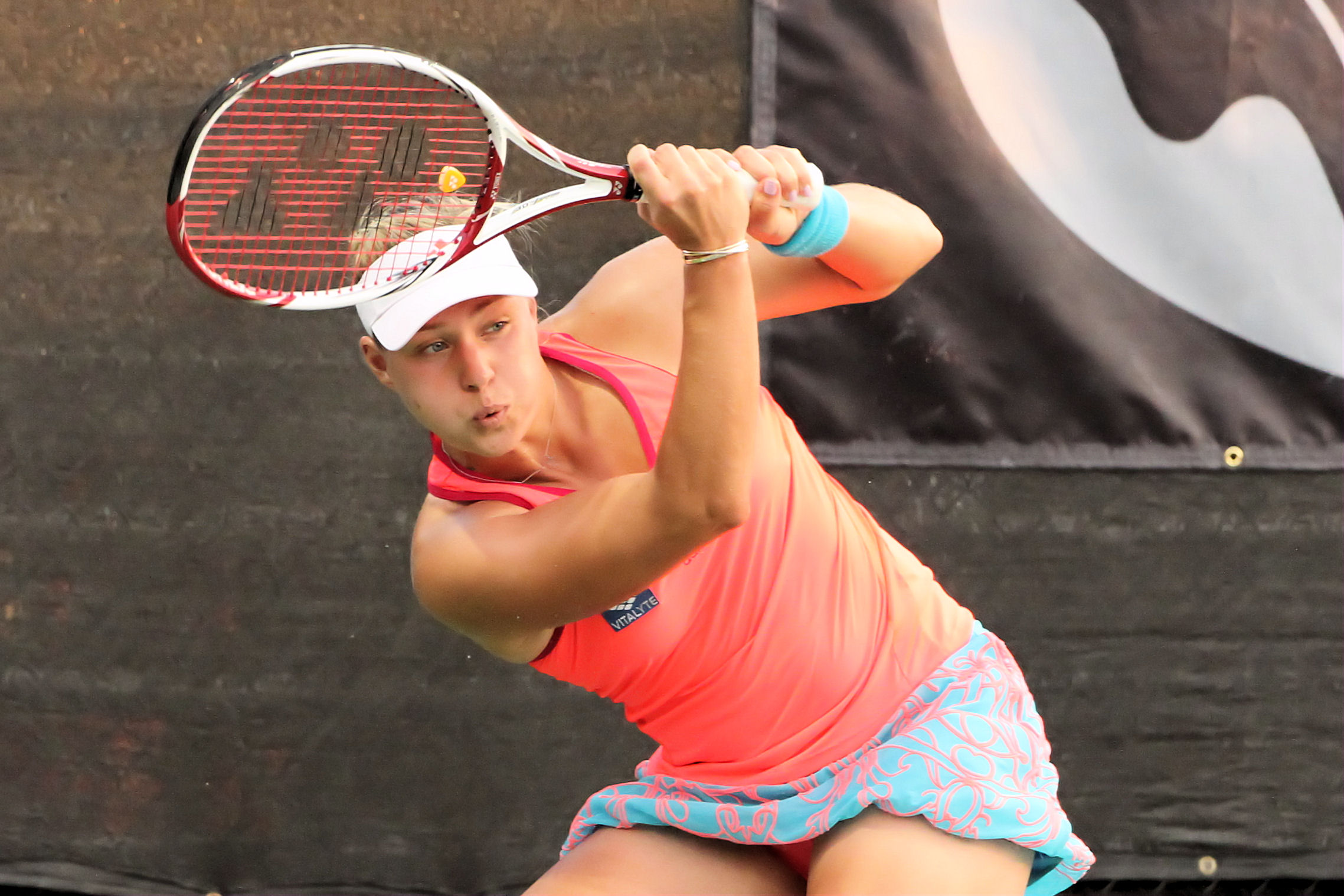
Future top ten player Angelique Kerber won the first edition of the women's tournament in 2009

=== Women's singles ===
Year	Champion	Runner-up	Score
2011	(Greece) Eleni Daniilidou	(Bulgaria) Elitsa Kostova	6–3, 6–2
2010	(France) Olivia Sanchez	(Spain) Beatriz García Vidagany	6–3, 6–4
2009	(Germany) Angelique Kerber	(Slovakia) Kristína Kučová	6–3, 6–4

=== Women's doubles ===
Year	Champions	Runners-up	Score
2011	(Russia) Nina Bratchikova (France) Irena Pavlovic	(Russia) Marina Melnikova (Georgia (country)) Sofia Shapatava	6–2, 6–4
2010	(Japan) Akiko Yonemura (Japan) Tomoko Yonemura	(Ukraine) Valentyna Ivakhnenko (Ukraine) Kateryna Kozlova	6–4, 3–6, [10–4]
2009	(Czech Republic) Andrea Hlaváčková (Ukraine) Olga Savchuk	(Russia) Nina Bratchikova (Romania) Ágnes Szatmári	6–3, 6–3
