= 2022 Porto Open – Singles =

Singles
- 2022 Porto Open

Final
- Champion: (Turkey) Altuğ Çelikbilek
- Runner-up: (Australia) Christopher O'Connell
- Score: 7–6^{(7–5)}, 3–1 ret.

Events
Singles	Doubles
← 2021 ·	Porto Open	· 2023 →

Altuğ Çelikbilek was the defending champion and successfully defended his title after Christopher O'Connell retired at 7–6^{(7–5)}, 3–1 down in the final.

== Seeds ==
1. (Australia) James Duckworth (semifinals)
2. (Japan) Yoshihito Nishioka (semifinals)
3. (Australia) Christopher O'Connell (final, retired)
4. (Portugal) Nuno Borges (first round)
5. (France) Hugo Grenier (quarterfinals, retired)
6. Egor Gerasimov (quarterfinals)
7. (France) Constant Lestienne (first round, retired)
8. (Ecuador) Emilio Gómez (withdrew)

== Draw ==
=== Key ===
- Q = Qualifier
- WC = Wild card
- LL = Lucky loser
- Alt = Alternate
- SE = Special exempt
- PR = Protected ranking
- ITF = ITF entry
- JE = Junior exempt
- w/o = Walkover
- r = Retired
- d = Defaulted
- SR = Special ranking

=== Finals ===
Semifinals
1	(Australia) James Duckworth	6^{5}	4
(Turkey) Altuğ Çelikbilek	7^{7}	6
3	(Australia) Christopher O'Connell	6	6
2	(Japan) Yoshihito Nishioka	3	3

Final
(Turkey) Altuğ Çelikbilek	7^{7}	3
3	(Australia) Christopher O'Connell	6^{5}	1^{r}

=== Top half ===
First round
1	(Australia) J Duckworth	6	6
WC	(Portugal) Pedro Araújo	3	4
Alt	(Switzerland) A Bellier	6	2	6
Alt	(Chinese Taipei) J Jung	3	6	4
(Bosnia and Herzegovina) M Bašić	6	4	3
Q	(United Kingdom) A McHugh	3	6	6
(Portugal) F Ferreira Silva	7	2
7	(France) C Lestienne	5	1^{r}
4	(Portugal) N Borges	6^{5}	4
(France) A Escoffier	7^{7}	6
(Turkey) A Çelikbilek	6	6
(Argentina) R Olivo	3	3
(Japan) Y Uchiyama	5	4
E Donskoy	7	6
Q	(Brazil) G Décamps	7^{7}	4	1
6	E Gerasimov	6^{3}	6	6

Second round
1	(Australia) J Duckworth	6	6
Alt	(Switzerland) A Bellier	2	1
Q	(United Kingdom) A McHugh	7^{7}	6
(Portugal) F Ferreira Silva	6^{5}	1
(France) A Escoffier	2	3
(Turkey) A Çelikbilek	6	6
E Donskoy	3	7^{9}	2
6	E Gerasimov	6	6^{7}	6

Quarterfinals
1	(Australia) J Duckworth	7^{7}	6
Q	(United Kingdom) A McHugh	6^{3}	0
(Turkey) A Çelikbilek	7	6
6	E Gerasimov	5	4

Semifinals
1	(Australia) J Duckworth	6^{5}	4
(Turkey) A Çelikbilek	7^{7}	6

=== Bottom half ===
First round
LL	(France) K de Schepper	6	6
Q	(United States) U Blanch	4	4
(Japan) K Uchida	7^{7}	7^{7}
(Ukraine) I Marchenko	6^{3}	6^{3}
WC	(Portugal) J Domingues	7	6^{2}	1
(France) G Barrère	5	7^{7}	6
Q	(Australia) O Jasika	2	4
3	(Australia) C O'Connell	6	6
5	(France) H Grenier	6	7
WC	(Portugal) P Sousa	3	5
(Japan) H Moriya	4	2
Q	(Portugal) Daniel Rodrigues	6	6
(United States) Em Nava	6	6
Q	(Brazil) T Bellucci	4	3
A Kuznetsov	6^{5}	5
2	(Japan) Y Nishioka	7^{7}	7

Second round
LL	(France) K de Schepper	5	3
(Japan) K Uchida	7	6
(France) G Barrère	3	1
3	(Australia) C O'Connell	6	6
5	(France) H Grenier	6	6
Q	(Portugal) D Rodrigues	4	2
(United States) Em Nava	6^{2}	3
2	(Japan) Y Nishioka	7^{7}	6

Quarterfinals
(Japan) K Uchida	4	2
3	(Australia) C O'Connell	6	6
5	(France) H Grenier	6	2	0^{r}
2	(Japan) Y Nishioka	2	6	4

Semifinals
3	(Australia) C O'Connell	6	6
2	(Japan) Y Nishioka	3	3
