= 2024 Porto Open – Men's doubles =

Men's doubles
- 2024 Porto Open

Final
- Champions: (Netherlands) Sander Arends (United Kingdom) Luke Johnson
- Runners-up: (United Kingdom) Joshua Paris (India) Ramkumar Ramanathan
- Score: 6–3, 6–2

Events
Singles	men	women
Doubles	men	women
← 2023 ·	Porto Open	· 2025 →

Toshihide Matsui and Kaito Uesugi were the defending champions but lost in the quarterfinals to Arjun Kadhe and Arthur Reymond.

Sander Arends and Luke Johnson won the title after defeating Joshua Paris and Ramkumar Ramanathan 6–3, 6–2 in the final.

== Seeds ==
1. (Netherlands) Sander Arends / (United Kingdom) Luke Johnson (champions)
2. (France) Jonathan Eysseric / (United States) George Goldhoff (first round)
3. (Poland) Karol Drzewiecki / (Poland) Piotr Matuszewski (semifinals, retired)
4. (India) Jeevan Nedunchezhiyan / (India) Vijay Sundar Prashanth (quarterfinals)

== Draw ==
Key

- Q = Qualifier
- WC = Wild card
- LL = Lucky loser
- Alt = Alternate
- ITF = ITF entry
- PR = Protected ranking
- SR = Special ranking
- SE = Special exempt
- JE = Junior exempt
- JR = Junior Accelerator Programme entrant
- CO = College Accelerator Programme entrant
- NG = Next Gen Accelerator Program entrant
- w/o = Walkover
- r = Retired
- d = Defaulted

=== Draw ===
First round
1	(Netherlands) S Arends (United Kingdom) L Johnson	6	6
(Uzbekistan) D Istomin (Kazakhstan) M Kukushkin	2	1
Alt	(China) J Cui (Ukraine) Vadym Ursu	6	1	[10]
E Gerasimov; E Karlovskiy	3	6	[7]
3	(Poland) K Drzewiecki (Poland) P Matuszewski	6	7
(Belgium) J De Loore (Belgium) M Geerts	4	5
WC	(Portugal) T Pereira (Portugal) D Vale	6	4	[10]
(South Korea) J-s Nam (New Zealand) R Statham	4	6	[8]
(United Kingdom) J Paris (India) R Ramanathan	6	6
WC	(Portugal) Pedro Araújo (Portugal) J Domingues	4	4
(United States) H Reese (India) D Sharan	3	7^{9}	[6]
4	(India) J Nedunchezhiyan (India) VS Prashanth	6	6^{7}	[10]
(France) A Escoffier (France) Jules Marie	7	4	[3]
(Japan) T Matsui (Japan) K Uesugi	5	6	[10]
PR	(India) A Kadhe (France) A Reymond	2	6	[10]
2	(France) J Eysseric (United States) G Goldhoff	6	4	[6]

Quarterfinals
1	(Netherlands) S Arends (United Kingdom) L Johnson	6	6
Alt	(China) J Cui (Ukraine) V Ursu	4	0
3	(Poland) K Drzewiecki (Poland) P Matuszewski	6	6
WC	(Portugal) T Pereira (Portugal) D Vale	3	4
(United Kingdom) J Paris (India) R Ramanathan	6^{3}	6	[10]
4	(India) J Nedunchezhiyan (India) VS Prashanth	7^{7}	4	[7]
(Japan) T Matsui (Japan) K Uesugi	6^{4}	3
PR	(India) A Kadhe (France) A Reymond	7^{7}	6

Semifinals
1	(Netherlands) S Arends (United Kingdom) L Johnson	6	0
3	(Poland) K Drzewiecki (Poland) P Matuszewski	3	0^{r}
(United Kingdom) J Paris (India) R Ramanathan	6^{2}	6	[10]
PR	(India) A Kadhe (France) A Reymond	7^{7}	4	[5]

Final
1	(Netherlands) S Arends (United Kingdom) L Johnson	6	6
(United Kingdom) J Paris (India) R Ramanathan	3	2
