= 2022 Porto Open =

- Date: 4 – 10 July
- Edition: 2nd
- Surface: Hard
- Location: Porto, Portugal

Champions

Singles
- (Turkey) Altuğ Çelikbilek

Doubles
- (India) Yuki Bhambri / (India) Saketh Myneni
← 2021 ·	Porto Open	· 2023 →

The 2022 Porto Open was a professional tennis tournament played on hardcourts. It was the second edition of the tournament which was part of the 2022 ATP Challenger Tour. It took place in Porto, Portugal between 4 and 10 July 2022.

== Singles main-draw entrants ==
=== Seeds ===
Country	Player	Rank^{1}	Seed
AUS	James Duckworth	74	1
JPN	Yoshihito Nishioka	101	2
AUS	Christopher O'Connell	108	3
POR	Nuno Borges	123	4
FRA	Hugo Grenier	141	5
	Egor Gerasimov	144	6
FRA	Constant Lestienne	149	7
~~ECU~~	~~Emilio Gómez~~	~~151~~	~~8~~

- ^{1} Rankings are as of 27 June 2022.

=== Other entrants ===
The following players received wildcards into the singles main draw:

- (Portugal) Pedro Araújo
- (Portugal) João Domingues
- (Portugal) Pedro Sousa

The following players received entry into the singles main draw as alternates:

- (Switzerland) Antoine Bellier
- (Chinese Taipei) Jason Jung

The following players received entry from the qualifying draw:

- (Brazil) Thomaz Bellucci
- (United States) Ulises Blanch
- (Brazil) Gabriel Décamps
- (Australia) Omar Jasika
- (United Kingdom) Aidan McHugh
- (Portugal) Daniel Rodrigues

The following player received entry as a lucky loser:

- (France) Kenny de Schepper

== Champions ==
=== Singles ===
- (Turkey) Altuğ Çelikbilek def. (Australia) Christopher O'Connell 7–6^{(7–5)}, 3–1 ret.

=== Doubles ===
- (India) Yuki Bhambri / (India) Saketh Myneni def. (Portugal) Nuno Borges / (Portugal) Francisco Cabral 6–4, 3–6, [10–6].
