= 2022 Porto Open – Doubles =

Doubles
- 2022 Porto Open

Final
- Champions: (India) Yuki Bhambri (India) Saketh Myneni
- Runners-up: (Portugal) Nuno Borges (Portugal) Francisco Cabral
- Score: 6–4, 3–6, [10–6]

Events
Singles	Doubles
- Porto Open

Guido Andreozzi and Guillermo Durán were the defending champions but chose not to defend their title.

Yuki Bhambri and Saketh Myneni won the title after defeating Nuno Borges and Francisco Cabral 6–4, 3–6, [10–6] in the final.

== Seeds ==
1. (Portugal) Nuno Borges / (Portugal) Francisco Cabral (final)
2. (India) Yuki Bhambri / (India) Saketh Myneni (champions)
3. (Philippines) Ruben Gonzales / (United States) Reese Stalder (quarterfinals)
4. (India) Purav Raja / (India) Divij Sharan (quarterfinals)

== Draw ==
Key

- Q = Qualifier
- WC = Wild card
- LL = Lucky loser
- Alt = Alternate
- ITF = ITF entry
- PR = Protected ranking
- SR = Special ranking
- SE = Special exempt
- JE = Junior exempt
- JR = Junior Accelerator Programme entrant
- CO = College Accelerator Programme entrant
- NG = Next Gen Accelerator Program entrant
- w/o = Walkover
- r = Retired
- d = Defaulted

First round
1	(Portugal) N Borges (Portugal) F Cabral	5	6	[10]
E Donskoy; A Kuznetsov	7	1	[8]
(Netherlands) M Hermans (South Africa) R Roelofse	4	2
(Switzerland) L Margaroli (Japan) Y Uchiyama	6	6
4	(India) P Raja (India) D Sharan	6	7^{9}
Alt	(Portugal) Fábio Coelho (Portugal) Gonçalo Falcão	2	6^{7}
WC	(Portugal) Pedro Araújo (Portugal) Daniel Rodrigues	4	6	[10]
(Bolivia) B Arias (Bolivia) F Zeballos	6	4	[7]
(India) A Chandrasekar (India) VS Prashanth	6^{3}	7	[8]
(Czech Republic) M Gengel (Finland) P Niklas-Salminen	7^{7}	5	[10]
WC	(Portugal) J Faria (Portugal) D Vale	6	6^{3}	[2]
3	(Philippines) R Gonzales (United States) R Stalder	4	7^{7}	[10]
(Bulgaria) A Donski (Austria) D Pichler	7^{7}	3	[5]
(Uzbekistan) D Istomin; A Kachmazov	6^{0}	6	[10]
(Switzerland) A Bellier (France) H Grenier	7	5	[6]
2	(India) Y Bhambri (India) S Myneni	5	7	[10]

Quarterfinals
1	(Portugal) N Borges (Portugal) F Cabral	6	6
(Switzerland) L Margaroli (Japan) Y Uchiyama	2	1
4	(India) P Raja (India) D Sharan	6	5	[8]
WC	(Portugal) P Araújo (Portugal) D Rodrigues	3	7	[10]
(Czech Republic) M Gengel (Finland) P Niklas-Salminen	6	6
3	(Philippines) R Gonzales (United States) R Stalder	3	4
(Uzbekistan) D Istomin; A Kachmazov	6	4	[8]
2	(India) Y Bhambri (India) S Myneni	4	6	[10]

Semifinals
1	(Portugal) N Borges (Portugal) F Cabral	7^{8}	6
WC	(Portugal) P Araújo (Portugal) D Rodrigues	6^{6}	4
(Czech Republic) M Gengel (Finland) P Niklas-Salminen	4	6^{4}
2	(India) Y Bhambri (India) S Myneni	6	7^{7}

Final
1	(Portugal) N Borges (Portugal) F Cabral	4	6	[6]
2	(India) Y Bhambri (India) S Myneni	6	3	[10]
