= 2024 Porto Open – Men's singles =

Men's singles
- 2024 Porto Open

Final
- Champion: (Denmark) August Holmgren
- Runner-up: (Spain) Alejandro Moro Cañas
- Score: 7–6^{(7–3)}, 7–6^{(8–6)}

Events
Singles	men	women
Doubles	men	women
- Porto Open

Luca Nardi was the defending champion but chose not to defend his title.

August Holmgren won the title after defeating Alejandro Moro Cañas 7–6^{(7–3)}, 7–6^{(8–6)} in the final.

== Seeds ==
1. (Slovakia) Lukáš Klein (second round)
2. (France) Richard Gasquet (withdrew)
3. (Kazakhstan) Mikhail Kukushkin (semifinals)
4. (France) Lucas Pouille (withdrew)
5. (Portugal) Jaime Faria (semifinals, retired)
6. (Spain) Alejandro Moro Cañas (final)
7. (Portugal) Henrique Rocha (second round)
8. (Kazakhstan) Timofey Skatov (second round)

== Draw ==
Key

- Q = Qualifier
- WC = Wild card
- LL = Lucky loser
- Alt = Alternate
- ITF = ITF entry
- PR = Protected ranking
- SR = Special ranking
- SE = Special exempt
- JE = Junior exempt
- JR = Junior Accelerator Programme entrant
- CO = College Accelerator Programme entrant
- NG = Next Gen Accelerator Program entrant
- w/o = Walkover
- r = Retired
- d = Defaulted

=== Finals ===
Semifinals
6	(Spain) Alejandro Moro Cañas	6	4
5	(Portugal) Jaime Faria	3	1^{r}
3	(Kazakhstan) Mikhail Kukushkin	7^{8}	5	6^{5}
(Denmark) August Holmgren	6^{6}	7	7^{7}

Final
6	(Spain) Alejandro Moro Cañas	6^{3}	6^{6}
(Denmark) August Holmgren	7^{7}	7^{8}

=== Top half ===
First round
1	(Slovakia) L Klein	6	6^{4}	6
E Gerasimov	3	7^{7}	1
Q	(Lithuania) E Butvilas	6	6
(France) R Bertrand	2	3
(Tunisia) A Dougaz	4	2
(Belgium) A Blockx	6	6
(France) A Escoffier	6	5	1
6	(Spain) A Moro Cañas	4	7	6
LL	(Ukraine) Vadym Ursu	6	6
WC	(Portugal) Francisco Rocha	1	4
Alt	(Portugal) G Elias	6	7^{7}
(Germany) S Fanselow	3	6^{1}
(France) Jules Marie	3	1
WC	(Portugal) J Domingues	6	6
(Hungary) Z Piros	1	2
5	(Portugal) J Faria	6	6

Second round
1	(Slovakia) L Klein	4	6^{8}
Q	(Lithuania) E Butvilas	6	7^{10}
(Belgium) A Blockx	6^{0}	4
6	(Spain) A Moro Cañas	7^{7}	6
LL	(Ukraine) V Ursu	6	6
Alt	(Portugal) G Elias	2	3
WC	(Portugal) J Domingues	6	3	4
5	(Portugal) J Faria	0	6	6

Quarterfinals
Q	(Lithuania) E Butvilas	6	6^{8}	4
6	(Spain) A Moro Cañas	4	7^{10}	6
LL	(Ukraine) V Ursu	7^{8}	3	5
5	(Portugal) J Faria	6^{6}	6	7

Semifinals
6	(Spain) A Moro Cañas	6	4
5	(Portugal) J Faria	3	1^{r}

=== Bottom half ===
First round
7	(Portugal) H Rocha	6	6
Q	(France) K de Schepper	2	4
SE	(Spain) Àlex Martínez	7^{13}	5	6
Q	(United Kingdom) H Searle	6^{11}	7	3
(France) V Royer	6^{5}	7^{7}	6^{5}
(Belgium) J De Loore	7^{7}	6^{3}	7^{7}
LL	(China) J Cui	6	2	1
3	(Kazakhstan) M Kukushkin	3	6	6
8	(Kazakhstan) T Skatov	6	6
WC	(Portugal) F Ferreira Silva	3	3
(Denmark) A Holmgren	6	1	6
(Belgium) M Geerts	4	6	3
A Kachmazov	6	7
Q	(Spain) A Sánchez Quílez	1	5
Q	(Argentina) R Olivo	6^{5}	2
Q	(France) A Reymond	7^{7}	6

Second round
7	(Portugal) H Rocha	2	3
SE	(Spain) À Martínez	6	6
(Belgium) J De Loore	6^{4}	3
3	(Kazakhstan) M Kukushkin	7^{7}	6
8	(Kazakhstan) T Skatov	6^{6}	6^{5}
(Denmark) A Holmgren	7^{8}	7^{7}
A Kachmazov	4	6^{4}
Q	(France) A Reymond	6	7^{7}

Quarterfinals
SE	(Spain) À Martínez	4	1
3	(Kazakhstan) M Kukushkin	6	6
(Denmark) A Holmgren	6	4	6
Q	(France) A Reymond	2	6	3

Semifinals
3	(Kazakhstan) M Kukushkin	7^{8}	5	6^{5}
(Denmark) A Holmgren	6^{6}	7	7^{7}
