= 2026 Porto Open – Men's singles =

Men's singles
- 2026 Porto Open

Final
- Champion: (Portugal) Henrique Rocha
- Runner-up: (Spain) Iñaki Montes de la Torre
- Score: 2–6, 6–4, 6–4

Events
Singles	men	women
Doubles	men	women
- Porto Open

Moez Echargui was the defending champion but lost in the second round to Edas Butvilas.

Henrique Rocha won the title after defeating Iñaki Montes de la Torre 2–6, 6–4, 6–4 in the final.

== Seeds ==
1. (France) Benjamin Bonzi (first round)
2. (United Kingdom) Jacob Fearnley (second round, retired)
3. (Netherlands) Jesper de Jong (first round, retired)
4. (United Kingdom) Toby Samuel (second round)
5. (Bosnia and Herzegovina) Damir Džumhur (first round)
6. (Croatia) Dino Prižmić (withdrew)
7. (Finland) Otto Virtanen (first round)
8. (Portugal) Henrique Rocha (champion)
9. (Bulgaria) Grigor Dimitrov (withdrew)

== Draw ==
Key

- Q = Qualifier
- WC = Wild card
- LL = Lucky loser
- Alt = Alternate
- ITF = ITF entry
- PR = Protected ranking
- SR = Special ranking
- SE = Special exempt
- JE = Junior exempt
- JR = Junior Accelerator Programme entrant
- CO = College Accelerator Programme entrant
- NG = Next Gen Accelerator Program entrant
- w/o = Walkover
- r = Retired
- d = Defaulted

=== Finals ===
Semifinals
8	(Portugal) Henrique Rocha	w/o
(Switzerland) Jérôme Kym
(Spain) David Jordà Sanchis	2	3
Alt	(Spain) Iñaki Montes de la Torre	6	6

Final
8	(Portugal) Henrique Rocha	2	6	6
Alt	(Spain) Iñaki Montes de la Torre	6	4	4

=== Top half ===
First round
1	(France) B Bonzi	3	4
(Denmark) A Holmgren	6	6
Q	(United Kingdom) A Matusevich	4	6	0
(Italy) A Guerrieri	6	4	6
(United Kingdom) M Basing	1	4
Alt	(Croatia) M Poljičak	6	6
(Romania) C Crețu	5	3
8	(Portugal) H Rocha	7	6
4	(United Kingdom) T Samuel	7	6
(United States) M McDonald	5	1
(Switzerland) J Kym	3	7	6
WC	(Portugal) T Torres	6	5	1
(Lithuania) E Butvilas	6	6
Q	(Belgium) M Geerts	4	1
(Tunisia) M Echargui	7	6
5	(Bosnia and Herzegovina) D Džumhur	5	0

Second round
(Denmark) A Holmgren	7	6
(Italy) A Guerrieri	5	1
Alt	(Croatia) M Poljičak	2	0
8	(Portugal) H Rocha	6	6
4	(United Kingdom) T Samuel	2	6	2
(Switzerland) J Kym	6	4	6
(Lithuania) E Butvilas	6	7
(Tunisia) M Echargui	1	5

Quarterfinals
(Denmark) A Holmgren	3	6^{7}
8	(Portugal) H Rocha	6	7^{9}
(Switzerland) J Kym	6^{5}	6	7^{7}
(Lithuania) E Butvilas	7^{7}	3	6^{5}

Semifinals
8	(Portugal) H Rocha	w/o
(Switzerland) J Kym

=== Bottom half ===
First round
Q	(Italy) Fausto Tabacco	1	1
(Spain) D Rincón	6	6
(United States) M Mmoh	4	4
(Serbia) L Djere	6	6
Q	(Portugal) Gonçalo Marques	7	1	6
Q	(Bulgaria) P Nesterov	5	6	4
(Spain) D Jordà Sanchis	6	3
3	(Netherlands) J de Jong	4	5^{r}
7	(Finland) O Virtanen	4	6	3
WC	(Portugal) T Pereira	6	2	6
(France) H Grenier	6	6
Alt	(Denmark) CE Overbeck	4	2
Q	(Italy) Luca Potenza	3	2
Alt	(Spain) I Montes de la Torre	6	6
LL	(Spain) A Sánchez Quílez	1	2
2	(United Kingdom) J Fearnley	6	6

Second round
(Spain) D Rincón	7^{8}	6
(Serbia) L Djere	6^{6}	4
Q	(Portugal) G Marques	4	5
(Spain) D Jordà Sanchis	6	7
WC	(Portugal) T Pereira	6^{8}	3
(France) H Grenier	7^{10}	6
Alt	(Spain) I Montes de la Torre	7^{7}	3
2	(United Kingdom) J Fearnley	6^{4}	0^{r}

Quarterfinals
(Spain) D Rincón	3	4
(Spain) D Jordà Sanchis	6	6
(France) H Grenier	2	6^{3}
Alt	(Spain) I Montes de la Torre	6	7^{7}

Semifinals
(Spain) D Jordà Sanchis	2	3
Alt	(Spain) I Montes de la Torre	6	6
