= 2026 Porto Open – Men's doubles =

Men's doubles
- 2026 Porto Open

Final
- Champions: (Serbia) Stefan Latinović (Croatia) Mili Poljičak
- Runners-up: (Bulgaria) Alexander Donski (Poland) Filip Pieczonka
- Score: 6–3, 6–4

Events
Singles	men	women
Doubles	men	women
- Porto Open

George Goldhoff and Ray Ho were the defending champions but chose not to defend their title.

Stefan Latinović and Mili Poljičak won the title after defeating Alexander Donski and Filip Pieczonka 6–3, 6–4 in the final.

== Seeds ==
1. (France) Arthur Reymond / (France) Luca Sanchez (quarterfinals)
2. (Switzerland) Jakub Paul / (Czech Republic) Matěj Vocel (first round)
3. (Bulgaria) Alexander Donski / (Poland) Filip Pieczonka (final)
4. (Monaco) Romain Arneodo / (United States) Benjamin Kittay (quarterfinals)

== Draw ==
Key

- Q = Qualifier
- WC = Wild card
- LL = Lucky loser
- Alt = Alternate
- ITF = ITF entry
- PR = Protected ranking
- SR = Special ranking
- SE = Special exempt
- JE = Junior exempt
- JR = Junior Accelerator Programme entrant
- CO = College Accelerator Programme entrant
- NG = Next Gen Accelerator Program entrant
- w/o = Walkover
- r = Retired
- d = Defaulted

First round
1	(France) A Reymond (France) L Sanchez	6	6
WC	(Portugal) J Domingues (Portugal) T Torres	2	1
(Serbia) S Latinović (Croatia) M Poljičak	7	6
WC	(Portugal) Vasco Leote Prata (Portugal) Diogo Morais	5	3
4	(Monaco) R Arneodo (United States) B Kittay	6	6^{4}	[12]
(Portugal) T Pereira (Portugal) Francisco Rocha	3	7^{7}	[10]
(Romania) A Jecan (Poland) S Kielan	6	3	[10]
(Poland) K Drzewiecki (Poland) P Matuszewski	3	6	[7]
(Uruguay) A Behar (United Kingdom) J Paris	6	6^{5}	[10]
(Croatia) A Kalender (Croatia) N Serdarušić	4	7^{7}	[8]
(Belgium) M Geerts (India) VS Prashanth	1	4
3	(Bulgaria) A Donski (Poland) F Pieczonka	6	6
(Israel) D Cukierman (Brazil) F Romboli	7^{7}	7
(United States) T Hilderbrand (Romania) B Pavel	6^{3}	5
(Colombia) N Barrientos (Poland) S Walków	6	0	[10]
2	(Switzerland) J Paul (Czech Republic) M Vocel	3	6	[5]

Quarterfinals
1	(France) A Reymond (France) L Sanchez	5	4
(Serbia) S Latinović (Croatia) M Poljičak	7	6
4	(Monaco) R Arneodo (United States) B Kittay	4	6	[7]
(Romania) A Jecan (Poland) S Kielan	6	3	[10]
(Uruguay) A Behar (United Kingdom) J Paris	2	1
3	(Bulgaria) A Donski (Poland) F Pieczonka	6	6
(Israel) D Cukierman (Brazil) F Romboli	6	4	[10]
(Colombia) N Barrientos (Poland) S Walków	2	6	[8]

Semifinals
(Serbia) S Latinović (Croatia) M Poljičak	6^{5}	7^{8}	[10]
(Romania) A Jecan (Poland) S Kielan	7^{7}	6^{6}	[6]
3	(Bulgaria) A Donski (Poland) F Pieczonka	6	6^{2}	[10]
(Israel) D Cukierman (Brazil) F Romboli	2	7^{7}	[7]

Final
(Serbia) S Latinović (Croatia) M Poljičak	6	6
3	(Bulgaria) A Donski (Poland) F Pieczonka	3	4
