= 2023 Porto Open – Doubles =

Doubles
- 2023 Porto Open

Final
- Champions: (Japan) Toshihide Matsui (Japan) Kaito Uesugi
- Runners-up: (India) Rithvik Choudary Bollipalli (India) Arjun Kadhe
- Score: 6–7^{(5–7)}, 6–3, [10–5]

Events
Singles	Doubles
- Porto Open

Yuki Bhambri and Saketh Myneni were the defending champions but chose not to defend their title.

Toshihide Matsui and Kaito Uesugi won the title after defeating Rithvik Choudary Bollipalli and Arjun Kadhe 6–7^{(5–7)}, 6–3, [10–5] in the final.

== Seeds ==
1. (France) Jonathan Eysseric / (Pakistan) Aisam-ul-Haq Qureshi (semifinals)
2. (South Korea) Nam Ji-sung / (South Korea) Song Min-kyu (first round)
3. (India) Rithvik Choudary Bollipalli / (India) Arjun Kadhe (final)
4. (Japan) Toshihide Matsui / (Japan) Kaito Uesugi (champions)

== Draw ==
Key

- Q = Qualifier
- WC = Wild card
- LL = Lucky loser
- Alt = Alternate
- ITF = ITF entry
- PR = Protected ranking
- SR = Special ranking
- SE = Special exempt
- JE = Junior exempt
- JR = Junior Accelerator Programme entrant
- CO = College Accelerator Programme entrant
- NG = Next Gen Accelerator Program entrant
- w/o = Walkover
- r = Retired
- d = Defaulted

First round
1	(France) J Eysseric (Pakistan) A-u-H Qureshi	7^{8}	7
(Zimbabwe) B Lock (Portugal) G Oliveira	6^{6}	5
WC	(Portugal) Gonçalo Falcão (Portugal) D Vale	4	2
(Philippines) FC Alcantara (Latvia) R Strombachs	6	6
4	(Japan) T Matsui (Japan) K Uesugi	6	6
(France) A Hoang (France) Jules Marie	1	2
(India) N Kaliyanda Poonacha (India) D Sharan	6	3	[10]
Alt	(Ukraine) Aleksandr Braynin (Kazakhstan) D Yevseyev	3	6	[5]
(Canada) S Diez (Colombia) N Mejía	6	6
WC	(Portugal) Pedro Araújo (Portugal) Fábio Coelho	1	3
(Portugal) J Faria (Portugal) H Rocha	6	1	[7]
3	(India) RC Bollipalli (India) A Kadhe	3	6	[10]
(Portugal) J Domingues (Portugal) F Ferreira Silva	w/o
(Italy) M Bellucci (Italy) Luca Potenza
(France) A Escoffier (United Kingdom) J Paris	6	6
2	(South Korea) J-s Nam (South Korea) M-k Song	1	3

Quarterfinals
1	(France) J Eysseric (Pakistan) A-u-H Qureshi	6	6
(Philippines) FC Alcantara (Latvia) R Strombachs	1	4
4	(Japan) T Matsui (Japan) K Uesugi	6	6
(India) N Kaliyanda Poonacha (India) D Sharan	4	4
(Canada) S Diez (Colombia) N Mejía	3	4
3	(India) RC Bollipalli (India) A Kadhe	6	6
(Portugal) J Domingues (Portugal) F Ferreira Silva	6	6
(France) A Escoffier (United Kingdom) J Paris	3	4

Semifinals
1	(France) J Eysseric (Pakistan) A-u-H Qureshi	6	6^{5}	[3]
4	(Japan) T Matsui (Japan) K Uesugi	4	7^{7}	[10]
3	(India) RC Bollipalli (India) A Kadhe	5	6	[10]
(Portugal) J Domingues (Portugal) F Ferreira Silva	7	3	[6]

Final
4	(Japan) T Matsui (Japan) K Uesugi	6^{5}	6	[10]
3	(India) RC Bollipalli (India) A Kadhe	7^{7}	3	[5]
