= 2001 Porto Open =

Tennis tournament

- Date: 2–8 April
- Edition: 1st
- Category: Tier IV
- Draw: 32S / 16D
- Prize money: $140,000
- Surface: Clay / outdoor
- Location: Porto, Portugal

Champions

Singles
- (Spain) Arantxa Sánchez-Vicario

Doubles
- (Spain) María José Martínez (Spain) Anabel Medina Garrigues
Porto Open	· 2002 →

The 2001 Porto Open was a women's tennis tournament played on outdoor clay courts in Porto, Portugal and was part of Tier IV of the 2001 WTA Tour. It was the inaugural edition of the tournament and was held from 2 April until 8 April 2001. First-seeded Arantxa Sánchez Vicario won the singles title and earned $22,000 first-prize money.

== Finals ==
=== Singles ===
(Spain) Arantxa Sánchez Vicario defeated (Spain) Magüi Serna 6–3, 6–1

- It was Sánchez Vicario's 2nd title of the year and the 90th of her career.

=== Doubles ===
(Spain) María José Martínez / (Spain) Anabel Medina Garrigues defeated (France) Alexandra Fusai / (Italy) Rita Grande 6–1, 6–7^{(5–7)}, 7–5

- It was Martínez's 2nd title of the year and the 2nd of her career. It was Medina Garrigues' 2nd title of the year and the 2nd of her career.
