= 2026 Porto Open =

- Date: 22–28 June (ITF men); 21–27 September (WTA 125); 28 September–4 October (ATP 125)
- Edition: 23rd (women); 20th (men)
- Category: WTA 125; ITF Men's Circuit; ATP Challenger 125
- Prize money: €203,900 (ATP) €100,000 (WTA)
- Surface: Hard / Outdoor
- Location: Porto, Portugal

Champions

Men's singles
- (Portugal) Henrique Rocha

Women's singles
- (Uzbekistan) Maria Timofeeva

Men's doubles
- (Serbia) Stefan Latinović / (Croatia) Mili Poljičak

Women's doubles
- (Portugal) Francisca Jorge / (Portugal) Matilde Jorge
- Porto Open

The 2026 Porto Open, known as the Eupago Porto Open (for sponsorship reasons), was a professional tennis tournament played on outdoor hardcourts. It was the twentieth edition of the men's event and the twenty-third edition of the women's event. The tournament was part of the ITF Men's Circuit, the 2026 WTA 125 and the 2026 ATP Challenger Tour.. It took place at the Complexo Desportivo Monte Aventino in Porto, Portugal, between 21 and 27 September 2026 for the women and between 28 September and 4 October 2026 for the men.

== ATP singles main-draw entrants ==
=== Seeds ===
Country	Player	Rank^{1}	Seed
FRA	Benjamin Bonzi	90	1
GBR	Jacob Fearnley	94	2
NED	Jesper de Jong	95	3
GBR	Toby Samuel	98	4
BIH	Damir Džumhur	100	5
~~CRO~~	~~Dino Prižmić~~	~~101~~	~~6~~
FIN	Otto Virtanen	103	7
POR	Henrique Rocha	116	8
~~BUL~~	~~Grigor Dimitrov~~	~~127~~	~~9~~

- ^{1} Rankings are as of 21 September 2026.

=== Other entrants ===
The following players received wildcards into the singles main draw:

- (Bulgaria) ~~Grigor Dimitrov~~
- (Portugal) Tiago Pereira
- (Portugal) Tiago Torres

The following players received entry into the singles main draw as alternates:

- (Spain) Iñaki Montes de la Torre
- (Denmark) Carl Emil Overbeck
- (Croatia) Mili Poljičak

The following players received entry from the qualifying draw:

- (Belgium) Michael Geerts
- (Portugal) Gonçalo Marques
- (United Kingdom) Anton Matusevich
- (Bulgaria) Petr Nesterov
- (Italy) Luca Potenza
- (Italy) Fausto Tabacco

The following player received entry as a lucky loser:

- (Spain) Alejo Sánchez Quílez

== WTA singles main-draw entrants ==
=== Seeds ===
Country	Player	Rank	Seed
UZB	Maria Timofeeva	87	1
AUT	Sinja Kraus	95	2
UKR	Veronika Podrez	126	3
USA	Carol Young Suh Lee	136	4
~~ITA~~	~~Lisa Pigato~~	~~137~~	~~5~~
SUI	Susan Bandecchi	143	6
CZE	Gabriela Knutson	163	7
AND	Victoria Jiménez Kasintseva	173	8
GBR	Katie Swan	208	9

- Rankings are as of 14 September 2026.

=== Other entrants ===
The following players received wildcards into the singles main draw:

- (Spain) Celia Cerviño Ruiz
- (Portugal) Teresa Franco Dias
- (Portugal) Madalena Matias
- (Portugal) Carla Tomai

The following players received entry from the qualifying draw:

- (United Kingdom) Naiktha Bains
- (United States) Reese Brantmeier
- (Germany) Valentina Steiner
- (Portugal) Angelina Voloshchuk

The following players received entry into the main draw as lucky losers:

- (United Kingdom) Sofia Johnson
- (India) Sahaja Yamalapalli

=== Withdrawals ===
Before the tournament

- (Armenia) Elina Avanesyan → replaced by (Estonia) Elena Malygina
- (Germany) Mona Barthel → replaced by (Germany) Caroline Werner
- (France) Clara Burel → replaced by (United Kingdom) Sofia Johnson (LL)
- (Canada) Kayla Cross → replaced by (United States) Ayana Akli
- (Poland) Linda Klimovičová → replaced by (Netherlands) Anouk Koevermans
- (Germany) Noma Noha Akugue → replaced by (Germany) Mina Hodzic
- (Italy) Lisa Pigato → replaced by (India) Sahaja Yamalapalli (LL)
- (Czech Republic) Dominika Šalková → replaced by (Portugal) Matilde Jorge
- (Germany) Ella Seidel → replaced by (France) Océane Dodin
- (Italy) Lucrezia Stefanini → replaced by (Portugal) Francisca Jorge
- (Switzerland) Jil Teichmann → replaced by (Sweden) Kajsa Rinaldo Persson
- (Czech Republic) Vendula Valdmannová → replaced by (Slovakia) Mia Pohánková

=== Retirement ===
- (Andorra) Victoria Jiménez Kasintseva

== WTA doubles main-draw entrants ==
=== Seeds ===
Country	Player	Country	Player	Rank^{1}	Seed
~~ESP~~	~~Yvonne Cavallé Reimers~~	~~BEL~~	~~Lara Salden~~	~~212~~	~~1~~
USA	Carmen Corley	USA	Ivana Corley	303	2
GBR	Freya Christie	GBR	Eden Silva	312	3
POR	Francisca Jorge	POR	Matilde Jorge	316	4
AUS	Gabriella Da Silva-Fick	AUS	Tenika McGiffin	318	5

- ^{1} Rankings are as of 14 September 2026.

=== Other entrants ===
The following pair received a wildcard into the doubles main draw:

- (Ukraine) Polina Isakova / (Portugal) Giulia Pereira de Aguiar

=== Withdrawals ===
- (Spain) Yvonne Cavallé Reimers / (Belgium) Lara Salden → replaced by (Portugal) Teresa Franco Dias / (Mexico) Jessica Hinojosa Gómez

== Champions ==
=== Men's singles ===
- (Portugal) Henrique Rocha def. (Spain) Iñaki Montes de la Torre 2–6, 6–4, 6–4.

=== Women's singles ===
- (Uzbekistan) Maria Timofeeva def. (United States) Reese Brantmeier 7–6^{(10–8)}, 6–2

=== Men's doubles ===
- (Serbia) Stefan Latinović / (Croatia) Mili Poljičak def. (Bulgaria) Alexander Donski / (Poland) Filip Pieczonka 6–3, 6–4.

=== Women's doubles ===
- (Portugal) Francisca Jorge / (Portugal) Matilde Jorge def. (Canada) Ariana Arseneault / (Canada) Raphaëlle Lacasse 6–3, 3–6, [10–3]
