= 2024 Porto Open – Women's singles =

Women's singles
- 2024 Porto Open

Final
- Champion: (Poland) Maja Chwalińska
- Runner-up: (France) Tessah Andrianjafitrimo
- Score: 7–5, 6–1

Events
Singles	men	women
Doubles	men	women
← 2023 ·	Porto Open	· 2025 →

Isabella Shinikova was the defending champion but lost in the first round to Valentina Ryser.

Maja Chwalińska won the title, defeating Tessah Andrianjafitrimo in the final, 7–5, 6–1.

== Seeds ==
1. (Japan) Mai Hontama (first round)
2. (Netherlands) Arianne Hartono (quarterfinals)
3. Anastasia Zakharova (quarterfinals)
4. (Australia) Maya Joint (quarterfinals)
5. (Thailand) Lanlana Tararudee (semifinals, retired)
6. Valeria Savinykh (first round)
7. (Croatia) Antonia Ružić (second round)
8. (France) Harmony Tan (first round)

== Draw ==
=== Key ===
- Q = Qualifier
- WC = Wild card
- LL = Lucky loser
- Alt = Alternate
- SE = Special exempt
- PR = Protected ranking
- ITF = ITF entry
- JE = Junior exempt
- w/o = Walkover
- r = Retired
- d = Defaulted
- SR = Special ranking

=== Finals ===
Semifinals
(Czech Republic) Gabriela Knutson	1	4
Q	(France) Tessah Andrianjafitrimo	6	6
5	(Thailand) Lanlana Tararudee	2	2^{r}
(Poland) Maja Chwalińska	6	4

Final
Q	(France) Tessah Andrianjafitrimo	5	1
(Poland) Maja Chwalińska	7	6

=== Top half ===
First round
1	(Japan) M Hontama	3	4
(Czech Republic) G Knutson	6	6
(Switzerland) V Ryser	6	6
(Bulgaria) I Shinikova	4	3
(Japan) A Ito	6	6
Q	E Yashina	1	2
Q	E Laskevich	6	6
6	V Savinykh	1	1
3	A Zakharova	6	6
WC	(Portugal) S Pinto	0	1
SR	Y Hatouka	1	2
Q	(Ukraine) K Volodko	6	6
Q	(Australia) A Bozovic	3	7	6
(Czech Republic) T Martincová	6	5	2
Q	(France) T Andrianjafitrimo	6	6
8	(France) H Tan	0	0

Second round
(Czech Republic) G Knutson	6	6
(Switzerland) V Ryser	2	2
(Japan) A Ito	3	6	0
Q	E Laskevich	6	3	6
3	A Zakharova	6	2	6
Q	(Ukraine) K Volodko	2	6	0
Q	(Australia) A Bozovic	6	3	2
Q	(France) T Andrianjafitrimo	4	6	6

Quarterfinals
(Czech Republic) G Knutson	6	3	6
Q	E Laskevich	4	6	1
3	A Zakharova	2	1
Q	(France) T Andrianjafitrimo	6	6

Semifinals
(Czech Republic) G Knutson	1	4
Q	(France) T Andrianjafitrimo	6	6

=== Bottom half ===
First round
5	(Thailand) L Tararudee	6	3
(Australia) M Inglis	1	0^{r}
(Canada) K Sebov	4	6	1
Q	(Australia) E Micic	6	0	6
(North Macedonia) L Gjorcheska	6	6
WC	(Portugal) C Tomai	0	1
Q	(Portugal) M Jorge	1	1
4	(Australia) M Joint	6	6
7	(Croatia) A Ružić	6	4	6
(France) A Hesse	0	6	2
SE	(Georgia (country)) M Bolkvadze	1	1
(Poland) M Chwalińska	6	6
(France) K Mladenovic	6^{3}	6	3
Q	(France) A Robbe	7^{7}	0	6
WC	(Portugal) T Franco Dias	0	2
2	(Netherlands) A Hartono	6	6

Second round
5	(Thailand) L Tararudee	7^{7}	6
Q	(Australia) E Micic	6^{2}	2
(North Macedonia) L Gjorcheska	2	7^{8}	3
4	(Australia) M Joint	6	6^{6}	6
7	(Croatia) A Ružić	3	0
(Poland) M Chwalińska	6	6
Q	(France) A Robbe	6	4	2
2	(Netherlands) A Hartono	0	6	6

Quarterfinals
5	(Thailand) L Tararudee	1	6	6
4	(Australia) M Joint	6	4	2
(Poland) M Chwalińska	6	6
2	(Netherlands) A Hartono	0	4

Semifinals
5	(Thailand) L Tararudee	2	2^{r}
(Poland) M Chwalińska	6	4
