= 2023 Porto Open – Singles =

Singles
- 2023 Porto Open

Final
- Champion: (Italy) Luca Nardi
- Runner-up: (Portugal) João Sousa
- Score: 5–7, 6–4, 6–1

Events
Singles	Doubles
- Porto Open

Altuğ Çelikbilek was the two-time defending champion but lost in the second round to Antoine Escoffier.

Luca Nardi won the title after defeating João Sousa 5–7, 6–4, 6–1 in the final.

== Seeds ==
1. (France) Quentin Halys (first round)
2. (France) Benjamin Bonzi (first round)
3. (France) Hugo Grenier (first round)
4. (Italy) Luca Nardi (champion)
5. (Italy) Mattia Bellucci (first round)
6. (United States) Emilio Nava (second round)
7. (France) Antoine Escoffier (semifinals)
8. (Lithuania) Ričardas Berankis (first round)

== Draw ==
Key

- Q = Qualifier
- WC = Wild card
- LL = Lucky loser
- Alt = Alternate
- ITF = ITF entry
- PR = Protected ranking
- SR = Special ranking
- SE = Special exempt
- JE = Junior exempt
- JR = Junior Accelerator Programme entrant
- CO = College Accelerator Programme entrant
- NG = Next Gen Accelerator Program entrant
- w/o = Walkover
- r = Retired
- d = Defaulted

=== Finals ===
Semifinals
(France) Jules Marie	6^{4}	0
WC	(Portugal) João Sousa	7^{7}	6
4	(Italy) Luca Nardi	7^{7}	6
7	(France) Antoine Escoffier	6^{3}	4

Final
WC	(Portugal) João Sousa	7	4	1
4	(Italy) Luca Nardi	5	6	6

=== Top half ===
First round
1	(France) Q Halys	5	5
WC	(Portugal) G Elias	7	7
(France) Jules Marie	6	6
(Zimbabwe) B Lock	3	4
Q	(Portugal) J Domingues	2	6	3
(Kazakhstan) D Yevseyev	6	3	6
Q	(Germany) J Härteis	6^{3}	6^{2}
6	(United States) Em Nava	7^{7}	7^{7}
3	(France) H Grenier	4	3
Q	(Portugal) J Faria	6	6
PR	(France) P-H Herbert	6	6
(France) L Lokoli	4	4
Q	(France) K de Schepper	4	4
A Kachmazov	6	6
WC	(Portugal) J Sousa	6^{5}	6	6
5	(Italy) M Bellucci	7^{7}	4	4

Second round
WC	(Portugal) G Elias	4	3
(France) J Marie	6	6
(Kazakhstan) D Yevseyev	3	6	7
6	(United States) Em Nava	6	3	5
Q	(Portugal) J Faria	7^{7}	4	4
PR	(France) P-H Herbert	6^{1}	6	6
A Kachmazov	2	2
WC	(Portugal) J Sousa	6	6

Quarterfinals
(France) J Marie	3	7^{9}	6
(Kazakhstan) D Yevseyev	6	6^{7}	4
PR	(France) P-H Herbert	6^{4}	2
WC	(Portugal) J Sousa	7^{7}	6

Semifinals
(France) J Marie	6^{4}	0
WC	(Portugal) J Sousa	7^{7}	6

=== Bottom half ===
First round
8	(Lithuania) R Berankis	6	4	6^{5}
(Germany) P Gojowczyk	2	6	7^{7}
(Bulgaria) A Andreev	6	7^{7}
(Czech Republic) D Palán	3	6^{2}
(Portugal) G Oliveira	6	6
Q	(France) L Poullain	4	0
(Colombia) N Mejía	6	2	3
4	(Italy) L Nardi	3	6	6
7	(France) A Escoffier	6	6
(Italy) L Giustino	3	4
(Portugal) F Ferreira Silva	4	7^{8}	3
(Turkey) A Çelikbilek	6	6^{6}	6
WC	(Portugal) H Rocha	6	4	6
Q	(Latvia) R Strombachs	4	6	4
(Canada) S Diez	6	6
2	(France) B Bonzi	4	4

Second round
(Germany) P Gojowczyk	6	3	2
(Bulgaria) A Andreev	2	6	6
(Portugal) G Oliveira	4	6	3
4	(Italy) L Nardi	6	3	6
7	(France) A Escoffier	6	7^{11}
(Turkey) A Çelikbilek	4	6^{9}
WC	(Portugal) H Rocha	3	2
(Canada) S Diez	6	6

Quarterfinals
(Bulgaria) A Andreev	4	3
4	(Italy) L Nardi	6	6
7	(France) A Escoffier	6	6
(Canada) S Diez	3	4

Semifinals
4	(Italy) L Nardi	7^{7}	6
7	(France) A Escoffier	6^{3}	4
