= 2021 Challenger Città di Lugano – Singles =

Singles
- 2021 Challenger Città di Lugano

Final
- Champion: (Switzerland) Dominic Stricker
- Runner-up: (Ukraine) Vitaliy Sachko
- Score: 6–4, 6–2

Events
Singles	Doubles
- Challenger Città di Lugano

This was the first edition of the tournament.

Dominic Stricker won the title after defeating Vitaliy Sachko 6–4, 6–2 in the final, and as No. 874 became the lowest-ranked champion in Challenger history.

== Seeds ==
1. (Japan) Yūichi Sugita (semifinals)
2. (Russia) Evgeny Donskoy (first round)
3. (Germany) Peter Gojowczyk (first round)
4. (Australia) Marc Polmans (first round)
5. (Ukraine) Illya Marchenko (first round)
6. (Russia) Roman Safiullin (quarterfinals)
7. (Germany) Yannick Maden (withdrew)
8. (Italy) Roberto Marcora (first round)

== Draw ==
Key

- Q = Qualifier
- WC = Wild card
- LL = Lucky loser
- Alt = Alternate
- ITF = ITF entry
- PR = Protected ranking
- SR = Special ranking
- SE = Special exempt
- JE = Junior exempt
- JR = Junior Accelerator Programme entrant
- CO = College Accelerator Programme entrant
- NG = Next Gen Accelerator Program entrant
- w/o = Walkover
- r = Retired
- d = Defaulted

=== Finals ===
Semifinals
1	(Japan) Yūichi Sugita	7	4	4
WC	(Switzerland) Dominic Stricker	5	6	6
Q	(Ukraine) Vitaliy Sachko	7	6
Alt	(Turkey) Altuğ Çelikbilek	5	0

Final
WC	(Switzerland) Dominic Stricker	6	6
Q	(Ukraine) Vitaliy Sachko	4	2

=== Top half ===
First round
1	(Japan) Y Sugita	6	7
(Germany) J Lenz	2	5
(Spain) A Menéndez Maceiras	7^{7}	4	3
WC	(Switzerland) L Riedi	6^{5}	6	6
LL	(Netherlands) J Sels	2	6	1
(Russia) E Karlovskiy	6	1	6
(Australia) A Santillan	1	6	6
LL	(United Kingdom) R Peniston	6	1	3
3	(Germany) P Gojowczyk	4	6	4
Q	(Netherlands) T van Rijthoven	6	4	6
(United Kingdom) J Clarke	4	4
WC	(Switzerland) D Stricker	6	6
(Japan) H Moriya	1	6	7
SE	(Germany) M Bachinger	6	3	5
(Germany) D Masur	7^{7}	7
5	(Ukraine) I Marchenko	6^{1}	5

Second round
1	(Japan) Y Sugita	7^{8}	6^{1}	6
WC	(Switzerland) L Riedi	6^{6}	7^{7}	4
(Russia) E Karlovskiy	6	6
(Australia) A Santillan	4	3
Q	(Netherlands) T van Rijthoven	7	4	6^{7}
WC	(Switzerland) D Stricker	5	6	7^{9}
(Japan) H Moriya	6	2	1
(Germany) D Masur	4	6	6

Quarterfinals
1	(Japan) Y Sugita	7^{7}	4	7^{7}
(Russia) E Karlovskiy	6^{4}	6	6^{2}
WC	(Switzerland) D Stricker	6	6
(Germany) D Masur	2	4

Semifinals
1	(Japan) Y Sugita	7	4	4
WC	(Switzerland) D Stricker	5	6	6

=== Bottom half ===
First round
6	(Russia) R Safiullin	6	6
WC	(Switzerland) J Kym	4	2
Alt	(United States) J Sock	6	6
Q	(Switzerland) A Bellier	4	3
(Ukraine) S Stakhovsky	6	6
Q	(Italy) F Forti	4	2
Q	(Ukraine) V Sachko	2	6	6
4	(Australia) M Polmans	6	4	2
8	(Italy) R Marcora	4	6^{3}
(France) H Grenier	6	7^{7}
(Australia) B Tomic	6	6
(Australia) A Vukic	4	3
Alt	(Austria) L Miedler	7^{7}	6
(Slovakia) L Lacko	6^{0}	4
Alt	(Turkey) A Çelikbilek	4	6	6
2	(Russia) E Donskoy	6	2	1

Second round
6	(Russia) R Safiullin	6	6
Alt	(United States) J Sock	4	3
(Ukraine) S Stakhovsky	3	1
Q	(Ukraine) V Sachko	6	6
(France) H Grenier	6	4	7
(Australia) B Tomic	4	6	5
Alt	(Austria) L Miedler	1^{r}
Alt	(Turkey) A Çelikbilek	4

Quarterfinals
6	(Russia) R Safiullin	4	3
Q	(Ukraine) V Sachko	6	6
(France) H Grenier	6	4	3
Alt	(Turkey) A Çelikbilek	4	6	6

Semifinals
Q	(Ukraine) V Sachko	7	6
Alt	(Turkey) A Çelikbilek	5	0
