= 2021 Porto Open – Doubles =

Doubles
- 2021 Porto Open

Final
- Champions: (Argentina) Guido Andreozzi (Argentina) Guillermo Durán
- Runners-up: (Argentina) Renzo Olivo (Mexico) Miguel Ángel Reyes-Varela
- Score: 6–7^{(5–7)}, 7–6^{(7–5)}, [11–9]

Events
Singles	Doubles
- Porto Open

This was the first edition of the tournament.

Guido Andreozzi and Guillermo Durán won the title after defeating Renzo Olivo and Miguel Ángel Reyes-Varela 6–7^{(5–7)}, 7–6^{(7–5)}, [11–9] in the final.

== Seeds ==
1. (France) Sadio Doumbia / (France) Fabien Reboul (quarterfinals)
2. (United States) Hunter Reese / (Netherlands) Sem Verbeek (semifinals)
3. (United States) Robert Galloway / (United States) Alex Lawson (semifinals)
4. (Ukraine) Sergiy Stakhovsky / (Austria) Tristan-Samuel Weissborn (first round)

== Draw ==
Key

- Q = Qualifier
- WC = Wild card
- LL = Lucky loser
- Alt = Alternate
- ITF = ITF entry
- PR = Protected ranking
- SR = Special ranking
- SE = Special exempt
- JE = Junior exempt
- JR = Junior Accelerator Programme entrant
- CO = College Accelerator Programme entrant
- NG = Next Gen Accelerator Program entrant
- w/o = Walkover
- r = Retired
- d = Defaulted

First round
(Argentina) R Olivo (Mexico) MÁ Reyes-Varela	7^{7}	7^{7}
(Ecuador) E Gómez (Portugal) G Oliveira	6^{5}	6^{3}
3	(United States) R Galloway (United States) A Lawson	6	6
WC	(Portugal) Luís Faria (Portugal) Daniel Rodrigues	3	3
(Uzbekistan) D Istomin (Kazakhstan) D Yevseyev	6	7
(Portugal) T Cação (Portugal) Gonçalo Falcão	2	5
(Canada) P Polansky (Chile) A Tabilo
(Portugal) N Borges (Portugal) F Cabral	w/o
(Argentina) G Andreozzi (Argentina) G Durán	6	6
4	(Ukraine) S Stakhovsky (Austria) T-S Weissborn	4	4
(France) G Blancaneaux (France) M Janvier	6	6^{4}	[6]
(India) S Balaji (Switzerland) L Margaroli	4	7^{7}	[10]
WC	(Portugal) Pedro Araújo (Portugal) Fábio Coelho	2	6	[7]
2	(United States) H Reese (Netherlands) S Verbeek	6	3	[10]

Quarterfinals
1	(France) S Doumbia (France) F Reboul	7^{7}	4	[7]
(Argentina) R Olivo (Mexico) MÁ Reyes-Varela	6^{3}	6	[10]
3	(United States) R Galloway (United States) A Lawson	7	6
(Uzbekistan) D Istomin (Kazakhstan) D Yevseyev	5	3
(Portugal) N Borges (Portugal) F Cabral	6^{5}	2
(Argentina) G Andreozzi (Argentina) G Durán	7^{7}	6
(India) S Balaji (Switzerland) L Margaroli	6^{5}	6^{4}
2	(United States) H Reese (Netherlands) S Verbeek	7^{7}	7^{7}

Semifinals
(Argentina) R Olivo (Mexico) MÁ Reyes-Varela	6	6
3	(United States) R Galloway (United States) A Lawson	2	4
(Argentina) G Andreozzi (Argentina) G Durán	6	6
2	(United States) H Reese (Netherlands) S Verbeek	3	4

Final
(Argentina) R Olivo (Mexico) MÁ Reyes-Varela	7^{7}	6^{5}	[9]
(Argentina) G Andreozzi (Argentina) G Durán	6^{5}	7^{7}	[11]
