= 2026 Porto Open – Women's singles =

Women's singles
- 2026 Porto Open

Final
- Champion: (Uzbekistan) Maria Timofeeva
- Runner-up: (United States) Reese Brantmeier
- Score: 7–6^{(10–8)}, 6–2

Events
Singles	men	women
Doubles	men	women
- Porto Open

Maria Timofeeva won the title, defeating Reese Brantmeier 7–6^{(10–8)}, 6–2 in the final.

Tereza Valentová was the defending champion, but chose not to participate.

== Seeds ==
1. (Uzbekistan) Maria Timofeeva (champion)
2. (Austria) Sinja Kraus (semifinals)
3. (Ukraine) Veronika Podrez (second round)
4. (United States) Carol Young Suh Lee (first round)
5. (Italy) Lisa Pigato (withdrew)
6. (Switzerland) Susan Bandecchi (first round)
7. (Czech Republic) Gabriela Knutson (quarterfinals)
8. (Andorra) Victoria Jiménez Kasintseva (first round, retired)
9. (United Kingdom) Katie Swan (quarterfinals)

== Draw ==
Key

- Q = Qualifier
- WC = Wild card
- LL = Lucky loser
- Alt = Alternate
- ITF = ITF entry
- PR = Protected ranking
- SR = Special ranking
- SE = Special exempt
- JE = Junior exempt
- JR = Junior Accelerator Programme entrant
- CO = College Accelerator Programme entrant
- NG = Next Gen Accelerator Program entrant
- w/o = Walkover
- r = Retired
- d = Defaulted

=== Finals ===
Semifinals
1	(Uzbekistan) Maria Timofeeva	6	6^{3}	6
(Slovakia) Mia Pohánková	2	7^{7}	3
Q	(United States) Reese Brantmeier	6	6
2	(Austria) Sinja Kraus	3	0

Final
1	(Uzbekistan) Maria Timofeeva	7^{10}	6
Q	(United States) Reese Brantmeier	6^{8}	2

=== Top half ===
First round
1	(Uzbekistan) M Timofeeva	6	6
LL	(United Kingdom) S Johnson	4	2
(Sweden) K Rinaldo Persson	6	6
WC	(Portugal) C Tomai	0	0
(Netherlands) A Koevermans	4	1
(United States) A Akli	6	6
(Canada) K Sebov	4	2
7	(Czech Republic) G Knutson	6	6
3	(Ukraine) V Podrez	4	6	6
WC	(Portugal) M Matias	6	1	2
(Portugal) F Jorge	2	1
(Slovakia) M Pohánková	6	6
Q	(Germany) V Steiner	6	7
(Germany) C Werner	2	5
LL	(India) S Yamalapalli	1	0
9	(United Kingdom) K Swan	6	6

Second round
1	(Uzbekistan) M Timofeeva	6	6
(Sweden) K Rinaldo Persson	3	0
(United States) A Akli	4	7	4
7	(Czech Republic) G Knutson	6	5	6
3	(Ukraine) V Podrez	3	4
(Slovakia) M Pohánková	6	6
Q	(Germany) V Steiner	1	0
9	(United Kingdom) K Swan	6	6

Quarterfinals
1	(Uzbekistan) M Timofeeva	6	6
7	(Czech Republic) G Knutson	1	2
(Slovakia) M Pohánková	3	7	6
9	(United Kingdom) K Swan	6	5	1

Semifinals
1	(Uzbekistan) M Timofeeva	6	6^{3}	6
(Slovakia) M Pohánková	2	7^{7}	3

=== Bottom half ===
First round
8	(Andorra) V Jiménez Kasintseva	2^{r}
Q	(United Kingdom) N Bains	5
E Andreeva	3	6^{5}
Q	(United States) R Brantmeier	6	7^{7}
Q	(Portugal) A Voloshchuk	6	6
WC	(Portugal) T Franco Dias	0	2
(France) H Tan	6	7
4	(United States) CYS Lee	2	5
6	(Switzerland) S Bandecchi	6	3	4
(France) O Dodin	1	6	6
(Germany) M Hodzic	4	7	4
(Estonia) E Malygina	6	5	6
(Portugal) M Jorge	6	6
WC	(Spain) C Cerviño Ruiz	3	4
(Australia) L Cabrera	1	4
2	(Austria) S Kraus	6	6

Second round
Q	(United Kingdom) N Bains	4	4
Q	(United States) R Brantmeier	6	6
Q	(Portugal) A Voloshchuk	6	1	6
(France) H Tan	1	6	0
(France) O Dodin	6	4	2
(Estonia) E Malygina	2	6	6
(Portugal) M Jorge	4	5
2	(Austria) S Kraus	6	7

Quarterfinals
Q	(United States) R Brantmeier	6	6
Q	(Portugal) A Voloshchuk	3	2
(Estonia) E Malygina	7^{7}	3	4
2	(Austria) S Kraus	6^{5}	6	6

Semifinals
Q	(United States) R Brantmeier	6	6
2	(Austria) S Kraus	3	0

== Qualifying ==
=== Seeds ===
1. (India) Sahaja Yamalapalli (qualifying competition, lucky loser)
2. (Portugal) Angelina Voloshchuk (qualified)
3. (United States) Kylie Collins (qualifying competition)
4. (United Kingdom) Sofia Johnson (qualifying competition, lucky loser)
5. (Canada) Ariana Arseneault (qualifying competition)
6. (United Kingdom) Naiktha Bains (qualified)
7. (United States) Reese Brantmeier (qualified)
8. (Germany) Valentina Steiner (qualified)

=== Qualifiers ===
1. (United Kingdom) Naiktha Bains
2. (Portugal) Angelina Voloshchuk
3. (Germany) Valentina Steiner
4. (United States) Reese Brantmeier

=== Lucky losers ===
1. (India) Sahaja Yamalapalli
2. (United Kingdom) Sofia Johnson

=== Qualifying draw ===
==== First qualifier ====
First round
1	(India) Sahaja Yamalapalli	6	6
(Spain) María Martínez Vaquero	0	3
WC	(Portugal) Madalena Santos	1	1
6	(United Kingdom) Naiktha Bains	6	6

Qualifying competition
1	(India) Sahaja Yamalapalli	2	4
6	(United Kingdom) Naiktha Bains	6	6

==== Second qualifier ====
First round
2	(Portugal) Angelina Voloshchuk	5	6	6
Alt	(Canada) Raphaëlle Lacasse	7	3	3
WC	(Portugal) Catarina Gomes	0	0
5	(Canada) Ariana Arseneault	6	6

Qualifying competition
2	(Portugal) Angelina Voloshchuk	6	7
5	(Canada) Ariana Arseneault	3	5

==== Third qualifier ====
First round
3	(United States) Kylie Collins	6	6
(Mexico) Jéssica Hinojosa Gómez	3	0
(Australia) Gabriella Da Silva-Fick	6	1^{r}
8	(Germany) Valentina Steiner	4	1

Qualifying competition
3	(United States) Kylie Collins	4	6	4
8	(Germany) Valentina Steiner	6	1	6

==== Fourth qualifier ====
First round
4	(United Kingdom) Sofia Johnson	6	6
(Czech Republic) Ivana Šebestová	2	2
(Netherlands) Jasmijn Gimbrère	1	0
7	(United States) Reese Brantmeier	6	6

Qualifying competition
4	(United Kingdom) Sofia Johnson	3	4
7	(United States) Reese Brantmeier	6	6
