= 2024 Porto Open =

Tennis tournament

- Date: 15–21 July 2024 (women); 29 July–4 August (men)
- Edition: 18th (men); 21st (women)
- Category: ATP Challenger Tour 125; ITF Women's World Tennis Tour
- Prize money: €148,625 (men) $60,000 (women)
- Surface: Hard / Outdoor
- Location: Porto, Portugal

Champions

Men's singles
- (Denmark) August Holmgren

Women's singles
- (Poland) Maja Chwalińska

Men's doubles
- (Netherlands) Sander Arends / (United Kingdom) Luke Johnson

Women's doubles
- (Netherlands) Arianne Hartono / (India) Prarthana Thombare
- Porto Open

The 2024 Porto Open, known as the Eupago Porto Open, was a professional tennis tournament played on outdoor hardcourts. It was the eighteenth (men) and twenty-first (women) editions of the tournament, which were part of the 2024 ATP Challenger Tour and the 2024 ITF Women's World Tennis Tour. It took place in Porto, Portugal, between 15 and 21 July 2024 for women and 29 July and 4 August 2024 for men.

== Champions ==
=== Men's singles ===
- (Denmark) August Holmgren def. (Spain) Alejandro Moro Cañas 7–6^{(7–3)}, 7–6^{(8–6)}.

=== Women's singles ===
- (Poland) Maja Chwalińska def. (France) Tessah Andrianjafitrimo, 7–5, 6–1

=== Men's doubles ===
- (Netherlands) Sander Arends / (United Kingdom) Luke Johnson def. (United Kingdom) Joshua Paris / (India) Ramkumar Ramanathan 6–3, 6–2.

=== Women's doubles ===
- (Netherlands) Arianne Hartono / (India) Prarthana Thombare def. (United States) Anna Rogers / (Ukraine) Kateryna Volodko, 6–3, 6–4

== Men's singles main-draw entrants ==
=== Seeds ===
Country	Player	Rank^{1}	Seed
SVK	Lukáš Klein	119	1
~~FRA~~	~~Richard Gasquet~~	~~130~~	~~2~~
KAZ	Mikhail Kukushkin	132	3
~~FRA~~	~~Lucas Pouille~~	~~154~~	~~4~~
POR	Jaime Faria	166	5
ESP	Alejandro Moro Cañas	171	6
POR	Henrique Rocha	172	7
KAZ	Timofey Skatov	185	8

- ^{1} Rankings are as of 22 July 2024.

=== Other entrants ===
The following players received wildcards into the singles main draw:

- (Portugal) João Domingues
- (Portugal) Frederico Ferreira Silva
- (Portugal) Francisco Rocha

The following player received entry into the singles main draw as a special exempt:

- (Spain) Àlex Martínez

The following player received entry into the singles main draw as an alternate:

- (Portugal) Gastão Elias

The following players received entry from the qualifying draw:

- (Lithuania) Edas Butvilas
- (France) Kenny de Schepper
- (Argentina) Renzo Olivo
- (France) Arthur Reymond
- (Spain) Alejo Sánchez Quílez
- (United Kingdom) Henry Searle

The following players received entry as lucky losers:

- (China) Cui Jie
- (Ukraine) Vadym Ursu

== Women's singles main draw entrants ==
=== Seeds ===
Country	Player	Rank	Seed
JPN	Mai Hontama	111	1
NED	Arianne Hartono	158	2
	Anastasia Zakharova	160	3
AUS	Maya Joint	168	4
THA	Lanlana Tararudee	191	5
	Valeria Savinykh	194	6
CRO	Antonia Ružić	201	7
FRA	Harmony Tan	207	8

- Rankings are as of 1 July 2024.

=== Other entrants ===
The following players received wildcards into the singles main draw:

- (Portugal) Teresa Franco Dias
- (Portugal) Sofia Pinto
- (Portugal) Carla Tomai

The following player received entry into the singles main draw using a special ranking:

- Yuliya Hatouka

The following player received entry into the singles main draw as a special exempt:

- (Georgia (country)) Mariam Bolkvadze

The following players received entry from the qualifying draw:

- (France) Tessah Andrianjafitrimo
- (Australia) Alexandra Bozovic
- (Portugal) Matilde Jorge
- Evialina Laskevich
- (Australia) Elena Micic
- (France) Alice Robbe
- (Ukraine) Kateryna Volodko
- Ekaterina Yashina
