= 2001 Porto Open – Singles =

Singles
- 2001 Porto Open

Final
- Champion: (Spain) Arantxa Sánchez Vicario
- Runner-up: (Spain) Magüi Serna
- Score: 6–3, 6–1

Details
- Draw: 32
- Seeds: 8

Events
Singles	Doubles
Porto Open	· 2002 →

Arantxa Sánchez Vicario won in the final 6–3, 6–1 against Magüi Serna.

== Seeds ==
A champion seed is indicated in bold text while text in italics indicates the round in which that seed was eliminated.

1. (Spain) **Arantxa Sánchez Vicario (champion)**
2. (United States) Chanda Rubin (second round)
3. (Spain) Magüi Serna (final)
4. (Italy) Silvia Farina Elia (semifinals)
5. (Croatia) Silvija Talaja (semifinals)
6. (Spain) Ángeles Montolio (second round)
7. (Italy) Rita Grande (first round)
8. (Spain) Marta Marrero (second round)

== Draw ==
=== Key ===
- Q = Qualifier
- WC = Wild card
- LL = Lucky loser
- Alt = Alternate
- SE = Special exempt
- PR = Protected ranking
- ITF = ITF entry
- JE = Junior exempt
- w/o = Walkover
- r = Retired
- d = Defaulted
- SR = Special ranking

First round
1	(Spain) **A Sánchez Vicario**	6^{4}	**6**	**6**
(Switzerland) E Gagliardi	**7^{7}**	0	2
(Austria) S Plischke	**6**	1	3
(Spain) **M Sánchez Lorenzo**	4	**6**	**6**
Q	(Spain) M J Martínez	**6**	4	1
Q	(Hungary) **P Mandula**	4	**6**	**6**
(Spain) A Medina Garrigues	3	4
8	(Spain) **M Marrero**	**6**	**6**
4	(Italy) **S Farina Elia**	**6**	**6**
(Netherlands) A Hopmans	2	1
(Czech Republic) A Gerši	3	3
(Spain) **C Torrens Valero**	**6**	**6**
Q	(Slovakia) **Ľ Cervanová**	**6**	3	**6**
LL	(Austria) P Wartusch	2	**6**	1
(Italy) F Schiavone	1	3
6	(Spain) **Á Montolio**	**6**	**6**
7	(Italy) R Grande	4	1
(Hungary) **R Kuti-Kis**	**6**	**6**
(Slovakia) **K Habšudová**	4	**6**	**6**
Q	(Spain) M Ramón	**6**	2	3
(Uzbekistan) **I Tulyaganova**	**6**	**7^{7}**
WC	(Slovenia) K Srebotnik	4	6^{4}
(Netherlands) K Boogert	2	**6**	3
3	(Spain) **M Serna**	**6**	4	**6**
5	(Croatia) **S Talaja**	3	**6**	**6**
(Italy) G Casoni	**6**	1	3
(Switzerland) **M Vavrinec**	**6**	**7**
(Belarus) T Poutchek	1	5
(Bulgaria) **L Bacheva**	**6**	4	**6**
WC	(Portugal) A C Nogueira	4	**6**	1
(Spain) N Llagostera	**6**	6^{8}	4
2	(United States) **C Rubin**	4	**7^{10}**	**6**

Second round
1	(Spain) **A Sánchez Vicario**	**6**	**6**
(Spain) M Sánchez Lorenzo	4	2
Q	(Hungary) **P Mandula**	**6**	**6**
8	(Spain) M Marrero	1	4
4	(Italy) **S Farina Elia**	**6**	**7**
(Spain) C Torrens Valero	1	5
Q	(Slovakia) **Ľ Cervanová**	2	**6**	**6**
6	(Spain) Á Montolio	**6**	4	3
(Hungary) **R Kuti-Kis**	**7**	**6**
(Slovakia) K Habšudová	5	3
(Uzbekistan) I Tulyaganova	4	4
3	(Spain) **M Serna**	**6**	**6**
5	(Croatia) **S Talaja**	**6**	**6**
(Switzerland) M Vavrinec	1	4
(Bulgaria) **L Bacheva**	**7^{7}**	**6**
2	(United States) C Rubin	6^{3}	1

Quarterfinals
1	(Spain) **A Sánchez Vicario**	2	**6**	**6**
Q	(Hungary) P Mandula	**6**	3	1
4	(Italy) **S Farina Elia**	**6**	**6**
Q	(Slovakia) Ľ Cervanová	2	1
(Hungary) R Kuti-Kis	**6**	4	6^{5}
3	(Spain) **M Serna**	3	**6**	**7^{7}**
5	(Croatia) **S Talaja**	**6**	**7**
(Bulgaria) L Bacheva	4	5

Semifinals
1	(Spain) **A Sánchez Vicario**	4	**6**	**6**
4	(Italy) S Farina Elia	**6**	0	1
3	(Spain) **M Serna**	**6**	**7^{7}**
5	(Croatia) S Talaja	3	6^{5}

Final
1	(Spain) **A Sánchez Vicario**	**6**	**6**
3	(Spain) Magüi Serna	3	1
