= 2021 Porto Open – Singles =

Singles
- 2021 Porto Open

Final
- Champion: (Turkey) Altuğ Çelikbilek
- Runner-up: (France) Quentin Halys
- Score: 6–2, 6–1

Events
Singles	Doubles
- Porto Open

This was the first edition of the tournament.

Altuğ Çelikbilek won the title after defeating Quentin Halys 6–2, 6–1 in the final.

== Seeds ==
1. (Brazil) Thiago Seyboth Wild (second round)
2. (India) Prajnesh Gunneswaran (second round)
3. (Ecuador) Emilio Gómez (semifinals)
4. (Chile) Alejandro Tabilo (first round)
5. (Portugal) Frederico Ferreira Silva (second round, retired)
6. (Japan) Go Soeda (first round)
7. (Australia) Thanasi Kokkinakis (second round)
8. (Uzbekistan) Denis Istomin (second round)

== Draw ==
Key

- Q = Qualifier
- WC = Wild card
- LL = Lucky loser
- Alt = Alternate
- ITF = ITF entry
- PR = Protected ranking
- SR = Special ranking
- SE = Special exempt
- JE = Junior exempt
- JR = Junior Accelerator Programme entrant
- CO = College Accelerator Programme entrant
- NG = Next Gen Accelerator Program entrant
- w/o = Walkover
- r = Retired
- d = Defaulted

=== Finals ===
Semifinals
(Turkey) Altuğ Çelikbilek	6	6
(Ukraine) Sergiy Stakhovsky	2	1
3	(Ecuador) Emilio Gómez	4	4
(France) Quentin Halys	6	6

Final
(Turkey) Altuğ Çelikbilek	6	6
(France) Quentin Halys	2	1

=== Top half ===
First round
1	(Brazil) T Seyboth Wild	6	6
(Argentina) R Olivo	4	2
(Turkey) A Çelikbilek	6	6^{5}	6
Q	(Japan) Yo Watanuki	3	7^{7}	3
(Japan) T Ito	6	6
LL	(Portugal) Luís Faria	0	2
(Italy) L Giustino	4	6	3
5	(Portugal) F Ferreira Silva	6	4	6
4	(Chile) A Tabilo	6	1	2
Alt	(Canada) P Polansky	1	6	6
WC	(Portugal) G Oliveira	6	6
WC	(Portugal) N Borges	1	2
(Dominican Republic) R Cid Subervi	1	1^{r}
Alt	(Italy) M Viola	6	4
(Ukraine) S Stakhovsky	2	6	7^{7}
6	(Japan) G Soeda	6	2	6^{5}

Second round
1	(Brazil) T Seyboth Wild	6^{5}	3
(Turkey) A Çelikbilek	7^{7}	6
(Japan) T Ito	6	1
5	(Portugal) F Ferreira Silva	4	0^{r}
Alt	(Canada) P Polansky	6^{3}	4
WC	(Portugal) G Oliveira	7^{7}	6
Alt	(Italy) M Viola	2	6	5
(Ukraine) S Stakhovsky	6	4	7

Quarterfinals
(Turkey) A Çelikbilek	7	6
(Japan) T Ito	5	3
WC	(Portugal) G Oliveira	6^{2}	6^{5}
(Ukraine) S Stakhovsky	7^{7}	7^{7}

Semifinals
(Turkey) A Çelikbilek	6	6
(Ukraine) S Stakhovsky	2	1

=== Bottom half ===
First round
8	(Uzbekistan) D Istomin	6	6
(Argentina) G Andreozzi	4	3
Q	(Netherlands) S Verbeek	7^{9}	4	1
WC	(Portugal) G Elias	6^{7}	6	6
Q	(France) G Blancaneaux	6^{5}	6	6
(Portugal) J Domingues	7^{7}	2	4
Alt	(Spain) N Kuhn	5	2
3	(Ecuador) E Gómez	7	6
7	(Australia) T Kokkinakis	7^{7}	6
(Italy) R Marcora	6^{3}	1
Q	(United States) U Blanch	3	6	1
(France) Q Halys	6	3	6
(France) M Janvier	5	6	6^{5}
(Canada) S Diez	7	2	7^{7}
(France) M Bourgue	2	6	1
2	(India) P Gunneswaran	6	3	6

Second round
8	(Uzbekistan) D Istomin	5	4
WC	(Portugal) G Elias	7	6
Q	(France) G Blancaneaux	1	7^{9}	1
3	(Ecuador) E Gómez	6	6^{7}	6
7	(Australia) T Kokkinakis	6^{5}	4
(France) Q Halys	7^{7}	6
(Canada) S Diez	6	1	6
2	(India) P Gunneswaran	3	6	4

Quarterfinals
WC	(Portugal) G Elias	3	6^{4}
3	(Ecuador) E Gómez	6	7^{7}
(France) Q Halys	6	6
(Canada) S Diez	3	0

Semifinals
3	(Ecuador) E Gómez	4	4
(France) Q Halys	6	6
