= 2026 Porto Open – Women's doubles =

Women's doubles
- 2026 Porto Open

Final
- Champions: (Portugal) Francisca Jorge (Portugal) Matilde Jorge
- Runners-up: (Canada) Ariana Arseneault (Canada) Raphaëlle Lacasse
- Score: 6–3, 3–6, [10–3]

Events
Singles	men	women
Doubles	men	women
- Porto Open

Francisca and Matilde Jorge won the title, defeating Ariana Arseneault and Raphaëlle Lacasse 6–3, 3–6, [10–3] in the final.

Carmen and Ivana Corley were the defending champions, but lost in the semifinals to Francisca and Matilde Jorge.

== Seeds ==
1. (Spain) Yvonne Cavallé Reimers / (Belgium) Lara Salden (withdrew)
2. (United States) Carmen Corley / (United States) Ivana Corley (semifinals)
3. (United Kingdom) Freya Christie / (United Kingdom) Eden Silva (first round)
4. (Portugal) Francisca Jorge / (Portugal) Matilde Jorge (champions)
5. (Australia) Gabriella Da Silva-Fick / (Australia) Tenika McGiffin (quarterfinals)

== Draw ==
Key

- Q = Qualifier
- WC = Wild card
- LL = Lucky loser
- Alt = Alternate
- ITF = ITF entry
- PR = Protected ranking
- SR = Special ranking
- SE = Special exempt
- JE = Junior exempt
- JR = Junior Accelerator Programme entrant
- CO = College Accelerator Programme entrant
- NG = Next Gen Accelerator Program entrant
- w/o = Walkover
- r = Retired
- d = Defaulted

=== Draw ===
First round
5	(Australia) G Da Silva-Fick (Australia) T McGiffin	6	6
WC	(Ukraine) P Isakova (Portugal) G Pereira De Aguiar	4	1
(United States) A Akli (Portugal) A Voloshchuk	6	6^{1}	[14]
(Canada) A Arseneault (Canada) R Lacasse	4	7^{7}	[16]
3	(United Kingdom) F Christie (United Kingdom) E Silva	3	3
(Japan) M Ayukawa (United Kingdom) E Webley-Smith	6	6
(Spain) C Cerviño Ruiz (Spain) M Martinez Vaquero	5	5
(United Kingdom) N Bains (India) S Yamalapalli	7	7
Alt	(Portugal) T Franco Dias (Mexico) J Hinojosa Gómez	3	0
(United States) R Brantmeier (United States) K Collins	6	6
(Germany) M Hodzic (Estonia) E Malygina	1	6	[12]
4	(Portugal) F Jorge (Portugal) M Jorge	6	3	[14]
(Czech Republic) M Bayerlová (Netherlands) J Gimbrère	2	6	[10]
(United Kingdom) M Brooks (Australia) L Cabrera	6	3	[8]
(Hungary) A Nagy (Czech Republic) I Šebestová	0	1
2	(United States) C Corley (United States) I Corley	6	6

Quarterfinals
5	(Australia) G Da Silva-Fick (Australia) T McGiffin	5	5
(Canada) A Arseneault (Canada) R Lacasse	7	7
(Japan) M Ayukawa (United Kingdom) E Webley-Smith	7^{9}	5	[3]
(United Kingdom) N Bains (India) S Yamalapalli	6^{7}	7	[10]
(United States) R Brantmeier (United States) K Collins	6	1	[6]
4	(Portugal) F Jorge (Portugal) M Jorge	3	6	[10]
(Czech Republic) M Bayerlová (Netherlands) J Gimbrère	5	3
2	(United States) C Corley (United States) I Corley	7	6

Semifinals
(Canada) A Arseneault (Canada) R Lacasse	6	6^{4}	[10]
(United Kingdom) N Bains (India) S Yamalapalli	3	7^{7}	[6]
4	(Portugal) F Jorge (Portugal) M Jorge	6	6
2	(United States) C Corley (United States) I Corley	2	1

Final
(Canada) A Arseneault (Canada) R Lacasse	3	6	[3]
4	(Portugal) F Jorge (Portugal) M Jorge	6	3	[10]
