= 2001 Porto Open – Doubles =

Doubles
- 2001 Porto Open

Final
- Champions: (Spain) María José Martínez (Spain) Anabel Medina Garrigues
- Runners-up: (France) Alexandra Fusai (Italy) Rita Grande
- Score: 6–1, 6–7^{(5–7)}, 7–5

Events
Singles	Doubles
- Porto Open

María José Martínez and Anabel Medina Garrigues won in the final 6–1, 6–7^{(5–7)}, 7–5 against Alexandra Fusai and Rita Grande.

== Seeds ==
Champion seeds are indicated in bold text while text in italics indicates the round in which those seeds were eliminated.

1. (Spain) Arantxa Sánchez Vicario / (Spain) Magüi Serna (quarterfinals)
2. (France) Alexandra Fusai / (Italy) Rita Grande (final)
3. (Slovenia) Tina Križan / (Slovenia) Katarina Srebotnik (semifinals)
4. (Slovakia) Karina Habšudová / (Uzbekistan) Iroda Tulyaganova (first round)

== Draw ==
Key

- Q = Qualifier
- WC = Wild card
- LL = Lucky loser
- Alt = Alternate
- ITF = ITF entry
- PR = Protected ranking
- SR = Special ranking
- SE = Special exempt
- JE = Junior exempt
- JR = Junior Accelerator Programme entrant
- CO = College Accelerator Programme entrant
- NG = Next Gen Accelerator Program entrant
- w/o = Walkover
- r = Retired
- d = Defaulted

First round
1	(Spain) **A Sánchez Vicario** (Spain) **M Serna**	**7^{7}**	**7^{7}**
(Italy) G Casoni (Italy) S Farina Elia	6^{5}	6^{5}
(Spain) G Riera (Spain) M Sánchez Lorenzo	3	3
(Spain) **M J Martínez** (Spain) **A Medina Garrigues**	**6**	**6**
4	(Slovakia) K Habšudová (Uzbekistan) I Tulyaganova	2	**6**	3
(Spain) **E Bes** (Spain) **L Domínguez Lino**	**6**	1	**6**
(Bulgaria) **L Bacheva** (Spain) **C Torrens Valero**	**7**	1	**6**
Q	(Hungary) Z Gubacsi (Federal Republic of Yugoslavia) D Zarić	5	**6**	3
(Hungary) **P Mandula** (Austria) **P Wartusch**	**6**	**6**
(South Africa) K Grant (Australia) T Musgrave	3	4
WC	(Brazil) V Menga (Portugal) A C Nogueira	3	2
3	(Slovenia) **T Križan** (Slovenia) **K Srebotnik**	**6**	**6**
(Czech Republic) E Martincová (Slovenia) M Matevžič	5	4
(Switzerland) **E Gagliardi** (Netherlands) **A Hopmans**	**7**	**6**
(Croatia) J Kostanić (Austria) S Plischke	**6**	4	4
2	(France) **A Fusai** (Italy) **R Grande**	4	**6**	**6**

Quarterfinals
1	(Spain) A Sánchez Vicario (Spain) M Serna	3	3
(Spain) **M J Martínez** (Spain) **A Medina Garrigues**	**6**	**6**
(Spain) E Bes (Spain) L Domínguez Lino	2	**6**	3
(Bulgaria) **L Bacheva** (Spain) **C Torrens Valero**	**6**	0	**6**
(Hungary) P Mandula (Austria) P Wartusch	4	6^{5}
3	(Slovenia) **T Križan** (Slovenia) **K Srebotnik**	**6**	**7^{7}**
(Switzerland) E Gagliardi (Netherlands) A Hopmans	4	6^{2}
2	(France) **A Fusai** (Italy) **R Grande**	**6**	**7^{7}**

Semifinals
(Spain) **M J Martínez** (Spain) **A Medina Garrigues**	2	**6**	**6**
(Bulgaria) L Bacheva (Spain) C Torrens Valero	**6**	0	3
3	(Slovenia) T Križan (Slovenia) K Srebotnik	2	6^{0}
2	(France) **A Fusai** (Italy) **R Grande**	**6**	**7^{7}**

Final
(Spain) **María José Martínez** (Spain) **Anabel Medina Garrigues**	**6**	6^{5}	**7**
2	(France) Alexandra Fusai (Italy) Rita Grande	1	**7^{7}**	5
