= 2024 Porto Open – Women's doubles =

Women's doubles
- 2024 Porto Open

Final
- Champions: (Netherlands) Arianne Hartono (India) Prarthana Thombare
- Runners-up: (United States) Anna Rogers (Ukraine) Kateryna Volodko
- Score: 6–3, 6–4

Events
Singles	men	women
Doubles	men	women
- Porto Open

Arianne Hartono and Prarthana Thombare won the title, defeating Anna Rogers and Kateryna Volodko in the final, 6–3, 6–4.

Gabriella Da Silva-Fick and Alexandra Osborne were the defending champions but Osborne chose not to participate. Da Silva-Fick partnered alongside Lizette Cabrera, but lost in the semifinals to Rogers and Volodko.

== Seeds ==
1. (Netherlands) Arianne Hartono / (India) Prarthana Thombare (champions)
2. (Portugal) Matilde Jorge / (Thailand) Lanlana Tararudee (quarterfinals)
3. (United States) Anna Rogers / (Ukraine) Kateryna Volodko (final)
4. Evialina Laskevich / Ekaterina Yashina (semifinals)

== Draw ==
Key

- Q = Qualifier
- WC = Wild card
- LL = Lucky loser
- Alt = Alternate
- ITF = ITF entry
- PR = Protected ranking
- SR = Special ranking
- SE = Special exempt
- JE = Junior exempt
- JR = Junior Accelerator Programme entrant
- CO = College Accelerator Programme entrant
- NG = Next Gen Accelerator Program entrant
- w/o = Walkover
- r = Retired
- d = Defaulted

First round
(Poland) M Chwalińska (Czech Republic) G Knutson	6	6
(United States) B Brown (Portugal) T Franco Dias	1	2
4	E Laskevich; E Yashina	6	6
(Japan) A Ito (United States) K McKenzie	2	3
(Australia) A Bozovic (Australia) E Micic	6	7
(Spain) C Cerviño Ruiz (Portugal) S Lança	1	5
(Romania) KP Bejenaru (India) R Bhatia	7^{7}	7^{11}
(Georgia (country)) Z Kardava (Ukraine) A Poplavska	6^{2}	6^{9}
(Australia) L Cabrera (Australia) G Da Silva-Fick	6	6
(Portugal) L Couto (Portugal) S Pinto	1	1

Quarterfinals
1	(Netherlands) A Hartono (India) P Thombare	w/o
(Poland) M Chwalińska (Czech Republic) G Knutson
4	E Laskevich; E Yashina	7^{7}	6
(Australia) A Bozovic (Australia) E Micic	6^{4}	3
(Romania) KP Bejenaru (India) R Bhatia	1	4
3	(United States) A Rogers (Ukraine) K Volodko	6	6
(Australia) L Cabrera (Australia) G Da Silva-Fick	6^{7}	6	[10]
2	(Portugal) M Jorge (Thailand) L Tararudee	7^{9}	4	[2]

Semifinals
1	(Netherlands) A Hartono (India) P Thombare	6^{6}	6	[10]
4	E Laskevich; E Yashina	7^{8}	1	[5]
3	(United States) A Rogers (Ukraine) K Volodko	6	6
(Australia) L Cabrera (Australia) G Da Silva-Fick	0	3

Final
1	(Netherlands) A Hartono (India) P Thombare	6	6
3	(United States) A Rogers (Ukraine) K Volodko	3	4
