= 2021 Porto Open =

- Date: 28 June – 4 July
- Edition: 1st
- Surface: Hard
- Location: Porto, Portugal

Champions

Singles
- (Turkey) Altuğ Çelikbilek

Doubles
- (Argentina) Guido Andreozzi / (Argentina) Guillermo Durán
- Porto Open

The 2021 Porto Open was a professional tennis tournament played on hardcourts. It was the first edition of the tournament which was part of the 2021 ATP Challenger Tour. It took place in Porto, Portugal between 28 June and 4 July 2021.

== Singles main-draw entrants ==
=== Seeds ===
Country	Player	Rank^{1}	Seed
BRA	Thiago Seyboth Wild	127	1
IND	Prajnesh Gunneswaran	147	2
ECU	Emilio Gómez	171	3
CHI	Alejandro Tabilo	174	4
POR	Frederico Ferreira Silva	176	5
JPN	Go Soeda	177	6
AUS	Thanasi Kokkinakis	182	7
UZB	Denis Istomin	188	8

- ^{1} Rankings are as of 21 June 2021.

=== Other entrants ===
The following players received wildcards into the singles main draw:

- (Portugal) Nuno Borges
- (Portugal) Gastão Elias
- (Portugal) Gonçalo Oliveira

The following players received entry into the singles main draw as alternates:

- (Spain) Nicola Kuhn
- (Canada) Peter Polansky
- (Italy) Matteo Viola

The following players received entry from the qualifying draw:

- (France) Geoffrey Blancaneaux
- (United States) Ulises Blanch
- (Netherlands) Sem Verbeek
- (Japan) Yosuke Watanuki

The following player received entry as a lucky loser:

- (Portugal) Luís Faria

== Champions ==
=== Singles ===
- (Turkey) Altuğ Çelikbilek def. (France) Quentin Halys 6–2, 6–1.

=== Doubles ===
- (Argentina) Guido Andreozzi / (Argentina) Guillermo Durán def. (Argentina) Renzo Olivo / (Mexico) Miguel Ángel Reyes-Varela 6–7^{(5–7)}, 7–6^{(7–5)}, [11–9].
