= Raphaëlle Lacasse =

Canadian tennis player (born 2000)

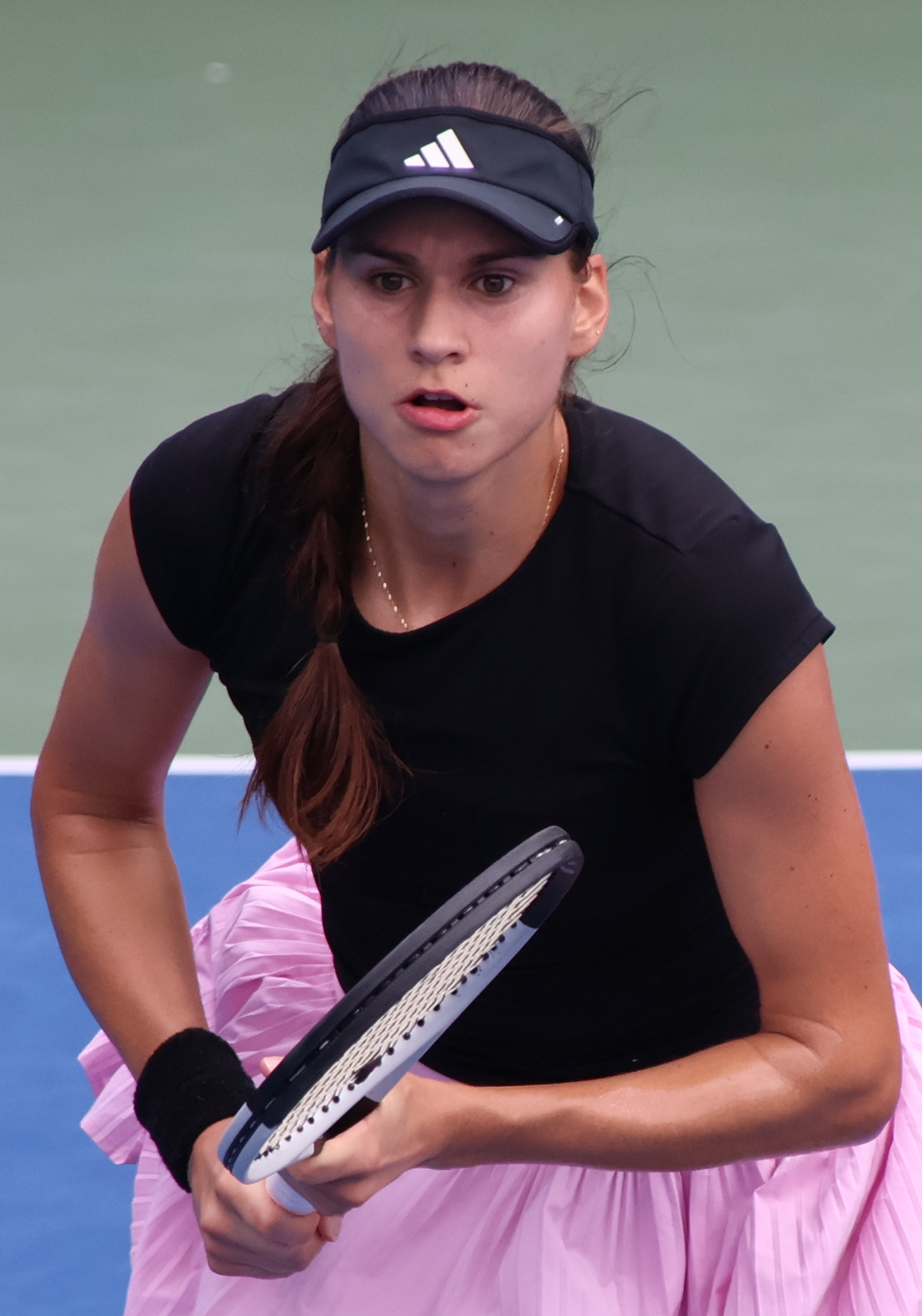
- Lacasse in 2026
- Country (sports): Canada
- Born: 16 August 2000 (age 26) Pierrefonds, Quebec
- Plays: Right-handed
- Prize money: $40,023

Singles
- Career record: 79–75
- Career titles: 1 ITF
- Highest ranking: No. 646 (24 November 2025)
- Current ranking: No. 716 (27 July 2026)

Doubles
- Career record: 85–66
- Career titles: 6 ITF
- Highest ranking: No. 213 (16 March 2026)
- Current ranking: No. 218 (27 July 2026)
- Last updated on: 31 July 2026.

Raphaëlle Lacasse (born 16 August 2000) is a Canadian tennis player.

Lacasse has a career-high singles ranking by the WTA of 646, achieved on 24 November 2025, and a best doubles ranking of world No. 213, achieved on 16 March 2026.

Lacasse played at the Kansas Jayhawks between 2021 and 2022 in the NCAA tennis championships. In June 2022, she transferred to Nebraska.

== Career ==
Lacasse won her first W75 title at the 2025 Challenger de Saguenay in the doubles draw, partnering with fellow Canadian Ariana Arseneault.

== WTA 125 finals ==
=== Doubles: 1 (runner-up) ===
Result	W–L	Date	Tournament	Surface	Partner	Opponents	Score
Loss	0–2	Sep 2026	Porto Open, Portugal	Hard	(Canada) Ariana Arseneault	(Portugal) Francisca Jorge (Portugal) Matilde Jorge	3–6, 6–3, [3–10]

== ITF Circuit finals ==
=== Singles: 1 (title) ===
Legend W15 tournaments (1–0)	Finals by surface Hard (1–0)

Result	W–L	Date	Tournament	Tier	Surface	Opponent	Score
Win	1–0	Nov 2019	ITF Cancún, Mexico	W15	Hard	(Slovakia) Viktória Morvayová	6–4, 7–5

=== Doubles: 16 (8 titles, 8 runner-ups) ===
Legend W75 tournaments (2–0) W50 tournaments (2–3) W35 tournaments (2–0) W15 tournaments (2–5)	Finals by surface Hard (8–7) Clay (0–1)

Result	W–L	Date	Location	Tier	Surface	Partner	Opponents	Score
Loss	0–1	Oct 2018	ITF Mexico City, Mexico	W15	Hard	(Mexico) María Fernanda Carvajal	(Mexico) Jéssica Hinojosa Gómez (Russia) Anastasiya Antal	1–6, 4–6
Loss	0–2	Sep 2019	ITF Buenos Aires, Argentina	W15	Clay	(Argentina) Eugenia Ganga	(Colombia) María Paulina Pérez (Colombia) Jessica Plazas	6–7^{(8)}, 4–6
Loss	0–3	Mar 2021	ITF Sharm El Sheikh, Egypt	W15	Hard	(South Korea) Ku Yeon-woo	(United Kingdom) Alicia Barnett (Japan) Yuriko Miyazaki	4–6, 1–6
Loss	0–4	Mar 2021	ITF Sharm El Sheikh	W15	Hard	(Czech Republic) Anna Sisková	(Romania) Elena-Teodora Cadar (Australia) Olivia Gadecki	3–6, 4–6
Win	1–4	Jun 2024	ITF Santo Domingo, Dominican Republic	W15	Hard	(Dominican Republic) Ana Carmen Zamburek	(India) Sharmada Balu (India) Riya Bhatia	6–3, 6–4
Win	2–4	Mar 2025	ITF Montreal, Canada	W15	Hard (i)	(United States) Christina McHale	(United States) Sara Daavettila (Mexico) Sabastiani León	7–5, 6–1
Loss	2–5	Aug 2025	ITF Saskatoon, Canada	W50	Hard	(Canada) Alexandra Vagramov	(Japan) Saki Imamura (Japan) Hiroko Kuwata	6–7^{(3)}, 6–3, [1–10]
Loss	2–6	Sep 2025	ITF Monastir, Tunisia	W15	Hard	(South Africa) Nelise Verster	(United Kingdom) Alicia Dudeney (United States) Megan Heuser	4–6, 7–6^{(6)}, [6–10]
Win	3–6	Oct 2025	ITF Quebec City, Canada	W35	Hard (i)	(Canada) Alexandra Vagramov	(Japan) Haruna Arakawa (Japan) Natsuho Arakawa	6–3, 6–2
Win	4–6	Oct 2025	Challenger de Saguenay, Canada	W75	Hard (i)	(Canada) Ariana Arseneault	(Netherlands) Jasmijn Gimbrère (United States) Anna Rogers	5–7, 6–3, [10–5]
Win	5–6	Nov 2025	ITF Chihuahua, Mexico	W50	Hard	(Canada) Ariana Arseneault	(Mexico) Fernanda Navarro (Canada) Alexandra Vagramov	2–6, 7–6^{(4)}, [10–6]
Loss	5–7	Nov 2025	ITF Chihuahua, Mexico	W50	Hard	(Canada) Ariana Arseneault	(United States) Dalayna Hewitt (United States) Anna Rogers	3–6, 0–6
Win	6–7	Feb 2026	ITF The Hague, Netherlands	W35	Hard (i)	(Canada) Ariana Arseneault	(New Zealand) Valentina Ivanov (Denmark) Rebecca Munk Mortensen	6–4, 3–6, [10–5]
Win	7–7	Sep 2026	ITF Évora, Portugal	W50	Hard	(Canada) Ariana Arseneault	(Slovakia) Katarína Kužmová (Australia) Elena Micic	6–3, 6–4
Loss	7–8	Oct 2026	ITF Quebec City, Canada	W50	Hard (i)	(Canada) Ariana Arseneault	(United States) Reese Brantmeier (United Kingdom) Mimi Xu	2–6, 7–6^{(5)}, [7–10]
Win	8–8	Oct 2026	Tevlin Women's Challenger, Canada	W75	Hard (i)	(Canada) Ariana Arseneault	(United States) Ayana Akli (United States) Madison Sieg	6–1, 7–6^{(3)}
