= 2023 Porto Open =

- Date: 31 July – 6 August
- Edition: 3rd
- Category: ATP Challenger Tour 125
- Surface: Hard
- Location: Porto, Portugal

Champions

Singles
- (Italy) Luca Nardi

Doubles
- (Japan) Toshihide Matsui / (Japan) Kaito Uesugi
- Porto Open

The 2023 Porto Open was a professional tennis tournament played on hardcourts. It was the third edition of the tournament which was part of the 2023 ATP Challenger Tour. It took place in Porto, Portugal between 31 July and 6 August 2023.

== Singles main-draw entrants ==
=== Seeds ===
Country	Player	Rank^{1}	Seed
FRA	Quentin Halys	66	1
FRA	Benjamin Bonzi	107	2
FRA	Hugo Grenier	122	3
ITA	Luca Nardi	154	4
ITA	Mattia Bellucci	175	5
USA	Emilio Nava	177	6
FRA	Antoine Escoffier	191	7
LTU	Ričardas Berankis	199	8

- ^{1} Rankings are as of 24 July 2023.

=== Other entrants ===
The following players received wildcards into the singles main draw:

- (Portugal) Gastão Elias
- (Portugal) Henrique Rocha
- (Portugal) João Sousa

The following player received entry into the singles main draw using a protected ranking:

- (France) Pierre-Hugues Herbert

The following players received entry from the qualifying draw:

- (France) Kenny de Schepper
- (Portugal) João Domingues
- (Portugal) Jaime Faria
- (Germany) Johannes Härteis
- (France) Lucas Poullain
- (Latvia) Robert Strombachs

== Champions ==
=== Singles ===
- (Italy) Luca Nardi def. (Portugal) João Sousa 5–7, 6–4, 6–1.

=== Doubles ===
- (Japan) Toshihide Matsui / (Japan) Kaito Uesugi def. (India) Rithvik Choudary Bollipalli / (India) Arjun Kadhe 6–7^{(5–7)}, 6–3, [10–5].
