= Altuğ Çelikbilek =

Turkish tennis player (born 1996)

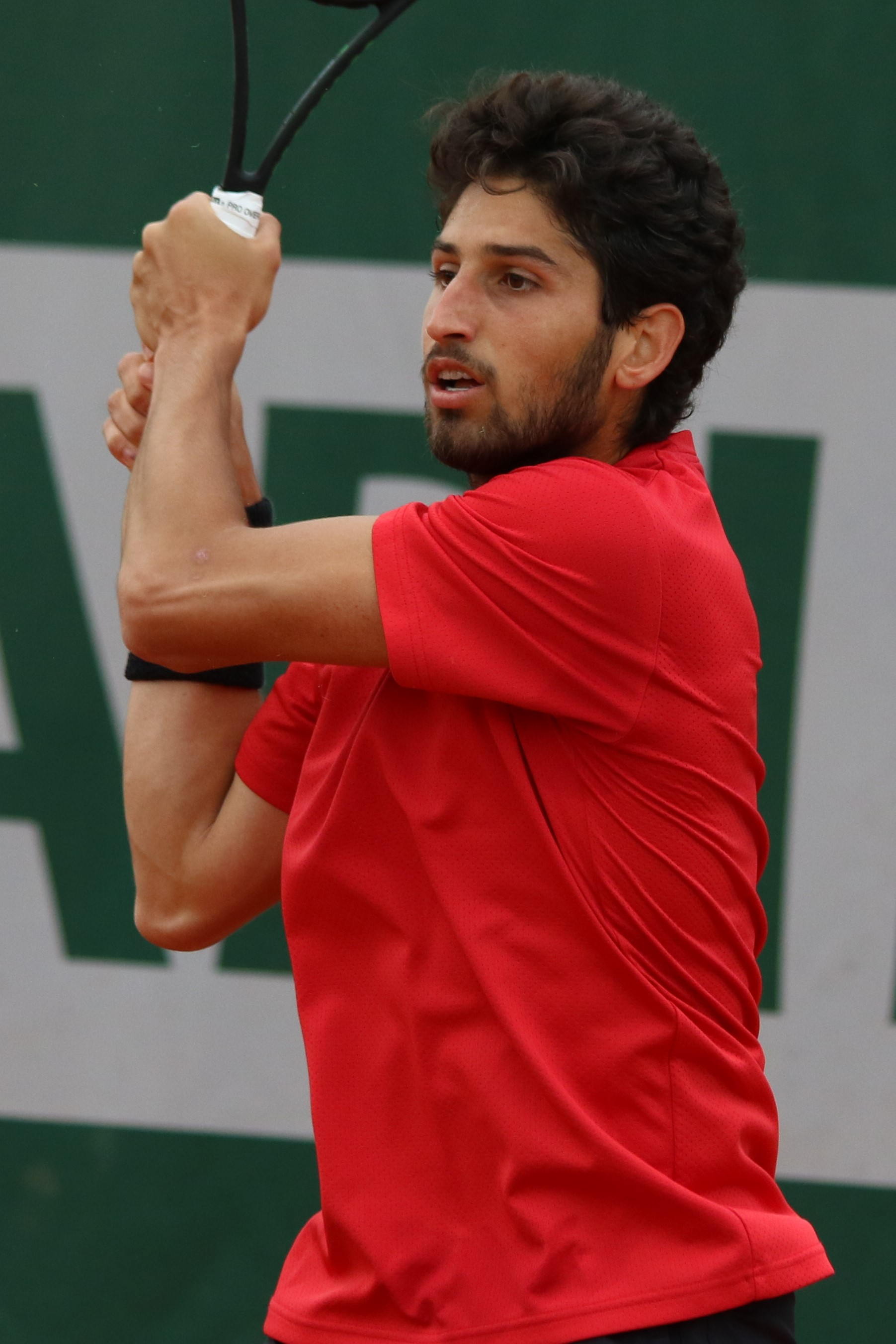
- Çelikbilek at the 2022 French Open
- Country (sports): Turkey
- Born: 7 September 1996 (age 30) Antalya, Türkiye
- Height: 1.83 m (6 ft 0 in)
- Turned pro: 2015
- Retired: November 2024 (last match played)
- Plays: Right-handed (two-handed backhand)
- Coach: Tobias Hinzmann
- Prize money: $505,026

Singles
- Career record: 13–12
- Career titles: 0
- Highest ranking: No. 154 (21 February 2022)

Grand Slam singles results
- Australian Open: Q1 (2022)
- French Open: Q2 (2021, 2022)
- Wimbledon: Q2 (2021, 2023)
- US Open: Q2 (2022)

Doubles
- Career record: 3–8
- Career titles: 0
- Highest ranking: No. 224 (25 July 2022)

Team competitions
- Davis Cup: 9–8
- Last updated on: 30 July 2026.

Altuğ Çelikbilek (Turkish pronunciation: [ˈaɫtuː ˈtʃelicbilec]; born 7 September 1996) is a Turkish former professional tennis player. He has a career high ATP singles ranking of world No. 154 achieved on 21 February 2022. He also has a career high ATP doubles ranking of No. 224, achieved on 25 July 2022. He is currently the tournament director of the ENKA Open. Çelikbilek has won 2 ATP Challengers and 5 ITF singles titles and 11 ITF doubles titles.

== Professional career ==
He made his Grand Slam debut at the 2021 French Open in the qualifying competition.

Çelikbilek has represented Turkey at Davis Cup, where he has a win–loss record of 5–7.

== Personal life ==
In December 2024, he suffered a stroke whilst competing at the ITF M25 in Monastir, shortly afterwards he had to have surgery to remove a brain tumour.

== ATP Challenger and ITF Tour finals ==
=== Singles: 13 (9 titles, 4 runner-ups) ===
| Legend ATP Challenger Tour (3–1) ITF Futures/WTT (6–3) | Finals by surface Hard (9–4) Clay (0–0) |

| Result | W–L | Date | Tournament | Tier | Surface | Opponent | Score |
|---|---|---|---|---|---|---|---|
| Loss | 0–1 | Nov 2016 | Turkey F45, Antalya | Futures | Hard | (Kazakhstan) Dmitry Popko | 2–6, 5–7 |
| Win | 1–1 | Feb 2017 | Turkey F7, Antalya | Futures | Hard | (Bulgaria) Alexandar Lazov | 4–6, 7–6^{(7–5)}, 6–4 |
| Win | 2–1 | Apr 2018 | Tunisia F16, Djerba | Futures | Hard | (Belgium) Yannick Mertens | 6–7^{(4–7)}, 6–3, 6–4 |
| Win | 3–1 | Oct 2018 | Germany F16, Hamburg | Futures | Hard | (Germany) Louis Wessels | 6–2, 2–6, 6–4 |
| Win | 4–1 | Feb 2019 | M15 Monastir, Tunisia | WTT | Hard | (Germany) Christoph Negritu | 2–6, 6–4, 6–1 |
| Win | 5–1 | May 2019 | M15 Sozopol, Bulgaria | WTT | Hard | (Bulgaria) Alexander Donski | 6–7^{(5–7)}, 6–3, 6–2 |
| Loss | 5–2 | Nov 2019 | M15 Monastir, Tunisia | WTT | Hard | (Croatia) Matija Pecotić | 1–6, 1–6 |
| Loss | 5–3 | Mar 2021 | St.Petersburg, Russia | Challenger | Hard | (Belgium) Zizou Bergs | 4–6, 6–3, 4–6 |
| Win | 6–3 | Jul 2021 | Porto, Portugal | Challenger | Hard | (France) Quentin Halys | 6–2, 6–1 |
| Win | 7–3 | Jul 2021 | Pozoblanco, Spain | Challenger | Hard | (Turkey) Cem İlkel | 6–1, 6–7^{(2–7)}, 6–3 |
| Win | 8–3 | Jul 2022 | Porto, Portugal | Challenger | Hard | (Australia) Christopher O'Connell | 7–6^{(7–5)}, 3–1 ret. |
| Loss | 8–4 | Aug 2024 | M15 Monastir, Tunisia | WTT | Hard | Yaroslav Demin | 4–6, ret. |
| Win | 9–4 | Sep 2024 | M15 Monastir, Tunisia | WTT | Hard | (Spain) Carles Hernández | 4–6, 6–3, 6–2 |

=== Doubles: 28 (13 titles, 15 runner-ups) ===
| Legend ATP Challenger Tour (1–0) ITF Futures/WTT (12–15) | Finals by surface Hard (9–11) Clay (4–3) Grass (0–0) Carpet (0–1) |

| Result | W–L | Date | Tournament | Tier | Surface | Partner | Opponents | Score |
|---|---|---|---|---|---|---|---|---|
| Loss | 0–1 | Jun 2014 | Turkey F21, Istanbul | Futures | Hard | (Turkey) Sarp Ağabigün | (Turkey) Cem Ilkel (Turkey) Efe Yurtacan | 4–6, 6–7^{(5–7)} |
| Loss | 0–2 | May 2015 | Turkey F21, Antalya | Futures | Hard | (Turkey) Sefa Suluoglu | (Venezuela) Ricardo Rodriguez (South Africa) Ruan Roelofse | 2–6, 2–6 |
| Loss | 0–3 | Jun 2015 | Turkey F22, Bursa | Futures | Hard | (Turkey) Sefa Suluoglu | (Italy) Alessandro Bega (Italy) Davide Melchiorre | 6–4, 5–7, [3–10] |
| Loss | 0–4 | Jul 2015 | Turkey F28, Ankara | Futures | Clay | (Turkey) Tuna Altuna | (Italy) Alessandro Bega (Italy) Francesco Vilardo | 4–6, 3–6 |
| Win | 1–4 | Sep 2015 | Turkey F35, Antalya | Futures | Hard | (Turkey) Sarp Ağabigün | (Czech Republic) Michal Konecny (Netherlands) Miliaan Niesten | 6–1, 7–6^{(7–5)} |
| Loss | 1–5 | Dec 2015 | Turkey F52, Antalya | Futures | Hard | (Turkey) Sarp Ağabigün | (Turkey) Tuna Altuna (Turkey) Cem Ilkel | 6–4, 2–6, [6–10] |
| Loss | 1–6 | Feb 2016 | Turkey F8, Antalya | Futures | Hard | (Turkey) Tuna Altuna | (Turkey) Sarp Ağabigün (Czech Republic) Marek Michalička | 6–4, 3–6, [9–11] |
| Loss | 1–7 | May 2016 | Turkey F18, Antalya | Futures | Hard | (Turkey) Sarp Ağabigün | (France) Hugo Nys (Latvia) Miķelis Lībietis | 2–6, 2–6 |
| Win | 2–7 | May 2016 | Turkey F20, Antalya | Futures | Hard | (Turkey) Sarp Ağabigün | (Ukraine) Filipp Kekercheni (Germany) Christoph Negritu | 7–5, 6–3 |
| Win | 3–7 | Aug 2016 | Netherlands F5, Oldenzaal | Futures | Clay | (Netherlands) Niels Lootsma | (France) Antoine Hoang (France) Benjamin Bonzi | 6–3, 6–3 |
| Win | 4–7 | Aug 2016 | Netherlands F6, Rotterdam | Futures | Clay | (France) Benjamin Bonzi | (Netherlands) Bobbie De Goeijen (Netherlands) Glenn Smits | 6–1, 6–4 |
| Win | 5–7 | Mar 2017 | Turkey F11, Antalya | Futures | Clay | (Peru) Mauricio Echazú | (Russia) Ilya Vasilyev (Russia) Victor Baluda | 7–5, 6–4 |
| Loss | 5–8 | Apr 2017 | Turkey F15, Antalya | Futures | Clay | (Turkey) Sarp Ağabigün | (Sweden) Isak Arvidsson (Brazil) Pedro Sakamoto | 3–6, 3–6 |
| Loss | 5–9 | Jun 2017 | Turkey F22, Istanbul | Futures | Clay | (Turkey) Sarp Ağabigün | (Bolivia) Hugo Dellien (Bolivia) Federico Zeballos | 4–6, 6–4, [3–10] |
| Win | 6–9 | Jul 2017 | Portugal F13, Idanha-a-Nova | Futures | Hard | (Turkey) Anil Yuksel | (United Kingdom) Jonathan Gray (France) Clement Larrière | 7–5, 6–2 |
| Loss | 6–10 | Oct 2017 | Germany F16, Hamburg | Futures | Hard | (Turkey) Anil Yuksel | (Germany) Marvin Moeller (France) Dan Added | 7–6^{(7–3)}, 6–7^{(4–7)}, [2–10] |
| Loss | 6–11 | Nov 2017 | Greece F9, Heraklion | Futures | Hard | (Belarus) Yaraslav Shyla | (Italy) Marco Bortolotti (United States) Miles Seemann | 6–7^{(1–7)}, 6–4, [7–10] |
| Win | 7–11 | Nov 2017 | Greece F10, Heraklion | Futures | Hard | (Argentina) Christopher Díaz Figueroa | (Italy) Marco Bortolotti (Mexico) Lucas Gomez | 6–2, 6–2 |
| Win | 8–11 | Jan 2018 | Turkey F1, Antalya | Futures | Hard | (Germany) Jakob Sude | (Czech Republic) Michal Konecny (Czech Republic) Patrik Rikl | 7–6^{(7–4)}, 2–6, [10–4] |
| Win | 9–11 | Feb 2018 | Turkey F6, Antalya | Futures | Hard | (Turkey) Cengiz Aksu | (Italy) Omar Giacalone (Italy) Pietro Rondoni | 6–3, 3–6, [10–3] |
| Win | 10–11 | Mar 2018 | Turkey F11, Antalya | Futures | Clay | (Turkey) Cem Ilkel | (Brazil) Rafael Matos (Brazil) Marcelo Zormann | 1–6, 6–4, [10–8] |
| Loss | 10–12 | Apr 2018 | Tunisia F15, Djerba | Futures | Hard | (Slovakia) Juraj Masar | (France) Dan Added (France) Hugo Voljacques | 1–6, 3–6 |
| Loss | 10–13 | Apr 2018 | Tunisia F16, Djerba | Futures | Hard | (Croatia) Domagoj Biljesko | (Portugal) Bernardo Saraiva (Netherlands) Sem Verbeek | 3–6, 1–6 |
| Loss | 10–14 | Sep 2018 | Tunisia F33, Monastir | Futures | Hard | (France) Florent Diep | (Belarus) Ivan Liutarevich (Tunisia) Skander Mansouri | 3–6, 1–6 |
| Loss | 10–15 | Oct 2018 | Germany F15, Bad Salzdetfurth | Futures | Carpet | (France) Hugo Voljacques | (Germany) Mats Rosenkranz (Czech Republic) Petr Nouza | 6–4, 3–6, [12–14] |
| Win | 11–15 | Oct 2018 | Germany F16, Hamburg | Futures | Hard | (Germany) Alexander Mannapov | (Belgium) Michael Geerts (Belgium) Christopher Heyman | 6–3, 1–6, [10–7] |
| Win | 12–15 | Oct 2018 | Germany F16, Hamburg | Futures | Hard | (Germany) Alexander Mannapov | (Belgium) Michael Geerts (Belgium) Christopher Heyman | 6–3, 1–6, [10–7] |
| Win | 13–15 | Jul 2022 | Málaga, Spain | Challenger | Hard | (Kazakhstan) Dmitry Popko | (Israel) Daniel Cukierman (Ecuador) Emilio Gómez | 6–7^{(4–7)}, 6–4, [10–6] |
