= Porto Open =

Eupago Porto Open
- 2026 Porto Open

Tournament information
- Event name: Eupago Porto Open
- Founded: 1999
- Location: Porto, Portugal
- Venue: Complexo Ténis Monte Aventino
- Surface: Hard / outdoors
- Website: eupagoportoopen.org

Current champions (2026)
- Men's singles: (Denmark) August Holmgren
- Women's singles: (Uzbekistan) Maria Timofeeva
- Men's doubles: (Netherlands) Sander Arends (United Kingdom) Luke Johnson
- Women's doubles: (Portugal) Francisca Jorge (Portugal) Matilde Jorge
ATP Tour
- Category: Challenger 125 (2023–2024, 2026–), Challenger 100 (2025); ITF Men's World Tennis Tour (2007–2020, 2025–)
- Draw: 32S / 32Q / 16D
- Prize money: €203,900
WTA Tour
- Category: WTA 125 (2025-), ITF Women's World Tennis Tour (1999–2000; 2003–2024); WTA Tour (2001–2002)
- Draw: 32S / 16Q / 16D
- Prize money: €100,000 (2026)

The Eupago Porto Open is a professional tennis tournament played on outdoor hardcourts. It is currently part of the ATP Challenger (since 2021) and the WTA Challenger Tour (since 2025), and the ITF Men's Circuit. It has been held annually at the Complexo Ténis Monte Aventino in Porto, Portugal, since 1999 for women and since 2007 for men. The 2025 edition was downgraded to a Challenger 100 and upgraded back to Challenger 125 in 2026.

Between 2001 and 2002, the tournament was classed as a Tier IV event on the Women's Tennis Association (WTA) Tour. It was held for two years (2001–2002), and had a total prize fund of $140,000 in each year. The most notable player to win the singles was three-time French Open champion Arantxa Sánchez Vicario, who won the 2001 event.

The tournament was played on clay courts up until the 2019 edition, when it changed to hardcourts.

== Past finals ==
=== Women's singles ===
Year	Champion	Runner-up	Score
↓ ITF tournament ↓
1999	(Bulgaria) Desislava Topalova	(Poland) Anna Bieleń-Żarska	7–6, 4–6, 7–5
2000	(Spain) María Sánchez Lorenzo	(Spain) Virginia Ruano Pascual	6–4, 4–6, 6–3
↓ WTA Tier IV tournament ↓
2001	(Spain) Arantxa Sánchez Vicario	(Spain) Magüi Serna	6–3, 6–1
2002	(Spain) Ángeles Montolio	(Spain) Magüi Serna	6–1, 2–6, 7–5
↓ ITF tournament ↓
2003	(France) Séverine Beltrame	(Austria) Sybille Bammer	6–2, 6–3
2004	(Italy) Nathalie Viérin	(Netherlands) Michelle Gerards	3–6, 7–5, 6–3
2005	(Austria) Tina Schiechtl	(Spain) Lourdes Domínguez Lino	7–6^{(7–4)}, 7–6^{(7–2)}
2006	Not held		
2007	(Czech Republic) Kateřina Vaňková	(Portugal) Catarina Ferreira	6–3, 6–2
2008	(Belgium) Appollonia Melzani	(Czech Republic) Kateřina Vaňková	6–3, 6–1
2009	(Spain) Irene Santos Bravo	(Netherlands) Marcella Koek	4–6, 6–1, 6–3
2010	(United States) Gail Brodsky	(Germany) Karolina Nowak	7–5, 6–1
2011–15	Not held		
2016	(Switzerland) Nina Stadler	(Portugal) Inês Murta	2–6, 6–2, 6–3
2017	(Slovakia) Michaela Hončová	(France) Sara Cakarevic	5–7, 6–1, 7–5
2018	(Spain) Cristina Bucșa	(Switzerland) Jil Teichmann	7–6^{(7–4)}, 6–1
2019	(Spain) Eva Guerrero Álvarez	(France) Myrtille Georges	6–4, 6–7^{(4–7)}, 6–3
2020 (1)	(Brazil) Beatriz Haddad Maia	(Brazil) Ingrid Gamarra Martins	6–3, 6–2
2020 (2)	(Spain) Georgina García Pérez	(Portugal) Francisca Jorge	1–6, 6–4, 6–3
2021	(Japan) Mai Hontama	(Russia) Anastasia Tikhonova	6–4, 6–3
2022	(Turkey) Pemra Özgen	(Spain) Eva Guerrero Álvarez	6–3, 2–6, 6–2
2023	(Bulgaria) Isabella Shinikova	(France) Kristina Mladenovic	6–4, 7–5
2024	(Poland) Maja Chwalińska	(France) Tessah Andrianjafitrimo	7–5, 6–1
↓ WTA 125 tournament ↓
2025	(Czech Republic) Tereza Valentová	(Thailand) Lanlana Tararudee	6–4, 6–2
2026	(Uzbekistan) Maria Timofeeva	(United States) Reese Brantmeier	7–6^{(10–8)}, 6–2

=== Men's singles ===
Year	Champion	Runner-up	Score
↓ ITF Men's tournament ↓
2007	(Portugal) Leonardo Tavares	(Argentina) Cristian Villagrán	4–6, 6–1, 6–2
2008	(Czech Republic) Jan Hájek	(Czech Republic) Dušan Lojda	6–0, 7–6^{(7–2)}
2009	(United Kingdom) Daniel Smethurst	(France) Benoît Paire	3–6, 6–4, 6–4
2010	(France) Laurent Rochette	(Germany) Alexander Flock	7–6^{(7–4)}, 7–6^{(8–6)}
2011	(Netherlands) Boy Westerhof	(Russia) Stanislav Vovk	7–5, 6–1
2012	(Spain) Marc Giner	(Switzerland) Henri Laaksonen	7–6^{(8–6)}, 6–2
2013	(Japan) Taro Daniel	(Spain) Ricardo Ojeda Lara	6–0, 6–3
2014	(Portugal) Fred Gil	(Portugal) Frederico Ferreira Silva	6–7^{(5–7)}, 6–3, 6–0
2015	(Belgium) Arthur De Greef	(Portugal) João Domingues	6–4, 6–0
2016	(Spain) Ricardo Ojeda Lara	(France) Gianni Mina	6–3, 1–6, 7–5
2017	(Portugal) João Monteiro	(Spain) Javier Martí	6–2, 7–5
2018	(Hungary) Máté Valkusz	(Portugal) Nuno Borges	6–3, 6–2
2019	(Spain) Pablo Vivero González	(Portugal) Daniel Rodrigues	6–2, 6–2
2020	(Portugal) Gastão Elias	(Portugal) Nuno Borges	6–3, 6–3
↓ ATP Challenger tournament ↓
2021	(Turkey) Altuğ Çelikbilek	(France) Quentin Halys	6–2, 6–1
2022	(Turkey) Altuğ Çelikbilek	(Australia) Christopher O'Connell	7–6^{(7–5)}, 3–1 ret.
2023	(Italy) Luca Nardi	(Portugal) João Sousa	5–7, 6–4, 6–1
2024	(Denmark) August Holmgren	(Spain) Alejandro Moro Cañas	7–6^{(7–3)}, 7–6^{(8–6)}
2025	(Tunisia) Moez Echargui	(Italy) Francesco Maestrelli	6–3, 6–2
2026	(Portugal) Henrique Rocha	(Spain) Iñaki Montes de la Torre	2–6, 6–4, 6–4

=== Women's doubles ===
Year	Champions	Runners-up	Score
↓ ITF tournament ↓
1999	(Spain) Lourdes Domínguez Lino (Spain) María José Martínez Sánchez	(Spain) Alicia Ortuño (Czech Republic) Michaela Paštiková	3–6, 6–2, 6–1
2000	(Spain) Eva Bes (Spain) Gisela Riera	(Spain) Rosa María Andrés Rodríguez (Spain) Conchita Martínez Granados	6–3, 6–3
↓ WTA Tier IV tournament ↓
2001	(Spain) María José Martínez Sánchez (Spain) Anabel Medina Garrigues	(France) Alexandra Fusai (Italy) Rita Grande	6–1, 6–7^{(5–7)}, 7–5
2002	(Zimbabwe) Cara Black (Kazakhstan) Irina Selyutina	(Netherlands) Kristie Boogert (Spain) Magüi Serna	7–6^{(8–6)}, 6–4
↓ ITF tournament ↓
2003	(Austria) Sybille Bammer (Italy) Laura Dell'Angelo	(Czech Republic) Iveta Gerlová (Canada) Marie-Ève Pelletier	6–3, 7–5
2004	(Ukraine) Yuliya Beygelzimer (Netherlands) Anousjka van Exel	(Italy) Sara Errani (Portugal) Joana Pangaio Pereira	7–5, 6–0
2005	(Romania) Simona Matei (Lithuania) Lina Stančiūtė	(Netherlands) Kelly de Beer (Netherlands) Eva Pera	2–6, 6–4, 6–4
2006	Not held		
2007	(Switzerland) Conny Perrin (Switzerland) Nicole Riner	(France) Claire de Gubernatis (France) Anna Savitskaya	5–7, 6–3, [10–3]
2008	(Czech Republic) Jana Orlová (Czech Republic) Kateřina Vaňková	(Netherlands) Michelle Gerards (Russia) Marina Melnikova	6–3, 4–6, [10–6]
2009	(Netherlands) Kim Kilsdonk (Netherlands) Marcella Koek	(Belgium) Appollonia Melzani (Italy) Andreea-Roxana Vaideanu	6–3, 6–0
2010	(Norway) Ulrikke Eikeri (Germany) Lena-Marie Hofmann	(United States) Gail Brodsky (United States) Alexandra Riley	7–6^{(7–4)}, 6–7^{(5–7)}, [10–5]
2011–15	Not held		
2016	(Chinese Taipei) Hsieh Shu-ying (Chinese Taipei) Hsieh Su-wei	(Portugal) Francisca Jorge (Portugal) Rita Vilaça	6–3, 6–4
2017	(United Kingdom) Emily Arbuthnott (Denmark) Emilie Francati	(Italy) Gaia Sanesi (Italy) Lucrezia Stefanini	6–4, 6–3
2018	(Paraguay) Montserrat González (Brazil) Laura Pigossi	(Spain) Cristina Bucșa (Japan) Ramu Ueda	7–5, 6–0
2019	(France) Estelle Cascino (Bulgaria) Julia Terziyska	(Sweden) Jacqueline Cabaj Awad (Portugal) Inês Murta	7–6^{(7–0)}, 6–3
2020 (1)	(Brazil) Carolina Alves (Spain) Marina Bassols Ribera	(Spain) Júlia Payola (Japan) Himeno Sakatsume	6–3, 4–6, [10–7]
2020 (2)	(United States) Jamie Loeb (Mexico) Ana Sofía Sánchez	(Croatia) Jana Fett (New Zealand) Erin Routliffe	2–6, 6–3, [10–8]
2021	(Netherlands) Arianne Hartono (Japan) Yuriko Lily Miyazaki	(Japan) Mana Ayukawa (Japan) Akiko Omae	7–5, 6–2
2022	(Chinese Taipei) Lee Ya-hsuan (Chinese Taipei) Wu Fang-hsien	(China) Lu Jiajing (Australia) Alana Parnaby	5–7, 6–4, [10–1]
2023	(Australia) Gabriella Da Silva-Fick (Australia) Alexandra Osborne	(Portugal) Francisca Jorge (Portugal) Matilde Jorge	6–4, 6–3
2024	(Netherlands) Arianne Hartono (India) Prarthana Thombare	(United States) Anna Rogers (Ukraine) Kateryna Volodko	6–3, 6–4
↓ WTA 125 tournament ↓
2025	(United States) Carmen Corley (United States) Ivana Corley	(Chinese Taipei) Liang En-shuo (Thailand) Peangtarn Plipuech	6–3, 6–1
2026	(Portugal) Francisca Jorge (Portugal) Matilde Jorge	(Canada) Ariana Arseneault (Canada) Raphaëlle Lacasse	6–3, 3–6, [10–3]

=== Men's doubles ===
Year	Champions	Runners-up	Score
↓ ITF Men's tournament ↓
2007	(Switzerland) Yann Marti (Argentina) Cristian Villagrán	(Spain) David Marrero (Spain) Pablo Santos	Walkover
2008	(Portugal) Nuno Marques (Portugal) Leonardo Tavares	(Russia) Vladislav Bondarenko (Ukraine) Vladyslav Klymenko	6–4, 6–3
2009	(Spain) Carlos Calderón Rodríguez (Spain) Pedro Clar	(United States) Greg Ouellette (United Kingdom) Daniel Smethurst	7–6^{(7–5)}, 6–3
2010	(Spain) Sergio Gutiérrez Ferrol (Spain) Carlos Poch Gradin	(Australia) Allen Perel (Spain) Gabriel Trujillo Soler	7–5, 6–3
2011	(Russia) Richard Muzaev (Russia) Alexander Rumyantsev	(Germany) Richard Becker (Brazil) Fernando Romboli	2–6, 7–6^{(7–3)}, [10–8]
2012	(Portugal) João Domingues (Portugal) Gonçalo Loureiro	(Germany) Steven Moneke (Germany) Marc Sieber	3–6, 6–1, [10–8]
2013	(Spain) Ricardo Ojeda Lara (Venezuela) Ricardo Rodríguez-Pace	(Spain) Iván Arenas Gualda (Portugal) João Domingues	4–6, 6–3, [10–8]
2014	(Portugal) Fred Gil (Portugal) Leonardo Tavares	(Portugal) Romain Barbosa (Portugal) Frederico Ferreira Silva	2–6, 6–3, [10–6]
2015	(Spain) Iván Arenas Gualda (Spain) David Vega Hernández	(Portugal) Nuno Deus (Portugal) João Domingues	6–3, 6–0
2016	(Portugal) Fred Gil (Spain) Marc Giner	(Spain) Marc Fornell Mestres (Portugal) Gonçalo Oliveira	3–6, 6–3, [10–3]
2017	(Portugal) Tiago Cação (Portugal) Nuno Deus	(Brazil) Rafael Matos (Brazil) Marcelo Zormann	2–6, 6–4, [10–8]
2018	(Brazil) Orlando Luz (Brazil) Felipe Meligeni Alves	(Portugal) Fred Gil (Austria) David Pichler	7–5, 3–6, [10–6]
2019	(Canada) Martin Beran (Israel) Daniel Cukierman	(Portugal) Francisco Dias (Portugal) Gonçalo Falcão	7–6^{(8–6)}, 7–5
2020	(Germany) Fabian Fallert (Germany) Johannes Härteis	(France) Dan Added (France) Sadio Doumbia	6–3, 7–6^{(7–5)}
↓ ATP Challenger tournament ↓
2021	(Argentina) Guido Andreozzi (Argentina) Guillermo Durán	(Argentina) Renzo Olivo (Mexico) Miguel Ángel Reyes-Varela	6–7^{(5–7)}, 7–6^{(7–5)}, [11–9]
2022	(India) Yuki Bhambri (India) Saketh Myneni	(Portugal) Nuno Borges (Portugal) Francisco Cabral	6–4, 3–6, [10–6]
2023	(Japan) Toshihide Matsui (Japan) Kaito Uesugi	(India) Rithvik Choudary Bollipalli (India) Arjun Kadhe	6–7^{(5–7)}, 6–3, [10–5]
2024	(Netherlands) Sander Arends (United Kingdom) Luke Johnson	(United Kingdom) Joshua Paris (India) Ramkumar Ramanathan	6–3, 6–2
2025	(United States) George Goldhoff (Chinese Taipei) Ray Ho	(Colombia) Nicolás Barrientos (Belgium) Joran Vliegen	6–4, 6–4
2026	(Serbia) Stefan Latinović (Croatia) Mili Poljičak	(Bulgaria) Alexander Donski (Poland) Filip Pieczonka	6–3, 6–4
