= 2022 Internazionali di Tennis Città di Verona – Doubles =

Doubles
- 2022 Internazionali di Tennis Città di Verona

Final
- Champions: (Venezuela) Luis David Martínez (Italy) Andrea Vavassori
- Runners-up: (Argentina) Juan Ignacio Galarza (Slovenia) Tomás Lipovšek Puches
- Score: 7–6^{(7–4)}, 3–6, [12–10]

Events
Singles	Doubles
← 2021 ·	Internazionali di Tennis Città di Verona	· 2023 →

Sadio Doumbia and Fabien Reboul were the defending champions but chose not to defend their title.

Luis David Martínez and Andrea Vavassori won the title after defeating Juan Ignacio Galarza and Tomás Lipovšek Puches 7–6^{(7–4)}, 3–6, [12–10] in the final.

== Seeds ==
1. (Venezuela) Luis David Martínez / (Italy) Andrea Vavassori (champions)
2. (Monaco) Romain Arneodo / (France) Jonathan Eysseric (first round)
3. (Italy) Marco Bortolotti / (Spain) Sergio Martos Gornés (quarterfinals)
4. (Czech Republic) Marek Gengel / (Czech Republic) Adam Pavlásek (semifinals)

== Draw ==
=== Key ===
- Q = Qualifier
- WC = Wild card
- LL = Lucky loser
- Alt = Alternate
- SE = Special exempt
- PR = Protected ranking
- ITF = ITF entry
- JE = Junior exempt
- w/o = Walkover
- r = Retired
- d = Defaulted
- SR = Special ranking

First round
1	(Venezuela) LD Martínez (Italy) A Vavassori	6	7^{7}
(Italy) R Brancaccio (Italy) A Pellegrino	3	6^{3}
(Bolivia) M Dellien (Argentina) M Kestelboim	6^{5}	6	[10]
(Greece) M Kalovelonis (Ukraine) V Manafov	7^{7}	3	[6]
WC	(Italy) Gabriele Crivellaro (Italy) Alessio Zanotti	2	2
(Argentina) G Andreozzi (Argentina) G Durán	6	6
(Italy) F Maestrelli (Italy) Samuel Vincent Ruggeri	6	7^{7}
(Italy) F Agamenone (Argentina) TA Tirante	4	6^{2}
WC	(Argentina) Gian Matías Di Natale (Italy) Samuele Seghetti	2	3
4	(Czech Republic) M Gengel (Czech Republic) A Pavlásek	6	6
(Italy) M Gigante (Italy) J Ocleppo	1	4
(Italy) G Fonio (Italy) G Oradini	6	6
(Argentina) Juan Ignacio Galarza (Slovenia) T Lipovšek Puches	3	6	[10]
2	(Monaco) R Arneodo (France) J Eysseric	6	3	[8]

Quarterfinals
1	(Venezuela) LD Martínez (Italy) A Vavassori	6	6^{4}	[11]
(Bolivia) M Dellien (Argentina) M Kestelboim	4	7^{7}	[9]
3	(Italy) M Bortolotti (Spain) S Martos Gornés	2	3
(Argentina) G Andreozzi (Argentina) G Durán	6	6
(Italy) F Maestrelli (Italy) S Vincent Ruggeri	5	2
4	(Czech Republic) M Gengel (Czech Republic) A Pavlásek	7	6
(Italy) G Fonio (Italy) G Oradini	3	3
(Argentina) JI Galarza (Slovenia) T Lipovšek Puches	6	6

Semifinals
1	(Venezuela) LD Martínez (Italy) A Vavassori	6	6
(Argentina) G Andreozzi (Argentina) G Durán	3	4
4	(Czech Republic) M Gengel (Czech Republic) A Pavlásek	6	3	[6]
(Argentina) JI Galarza (Slovenia) T Lipovšek Puches	1	6	[10]

Final
1	(Venezuela) LD Martínez (Italy) A Vavassori	7^{7}	3	[12]
(Argentina) JI Galarza (Slovenia) T Lipovšek Puches	6^{4}	6	[10]
