= 2022 Internazionali di Tennis Città di Verona =

- Date: 11–17 July
- Edition: 2nd
- Surface: Clay
- Location: Verona, Italy

Champions

Singles
- (Italy) Francesco Maestrelli

Doubles
- (Venezuela) Luis David Martínez / (Italy) Andrea Vavassori
← 2021 ·	Internazionali di Tennis Città di Verona	· 2023 →

The 2022 Internazionali di Tennis Città di Verona was a professional tennis tournament played on clay courts. It was the second edition of the tournament which was part of the 2022 ATP Challenger Tour. It took place in Verona, Italy, between 11 and 17 July 2022.

== Singles main draw entrants ==
=== Seeds ===
Country	Player	Rank^{1}	Seed
ARG	Pedro Cachin	120	1
SVK	Norbert Gombos	124	2
ITA	Gianluca Mager	136	3
ITA	Franco Agamenone	143	4
ITA	Flavio Cobolli	145	5
SRB	Nikola Milojević	154	6
FRA	Alexandre Müller	161	7
ITA	Marco Cecchinato	166	8

- ^{1} Rankings as of 27 June 2022.

=== Other entrants ===
The following players received wildcards into the singles main draw:

- (Italy) Marco Cecchinato
- (Australia) Bernard Tomic
- (Italy) Giulio Zeppieri

The following players received entry into the singles main draw as alternates:

- (Austria) Sebastian Ofner
- (Germany) Cedrik-Marcel Stebe
- (Italy) Andrea Vavassori

The following players received entry from the qualifying draw:

- (Italy) Mattia Bellucci
- (Brazil) Pedro Boscardin Dias
- (Italy) Raúl Brancaccio
- (Italy) Matteo Gigante
- (Switzerland) Jérôme Kym
- (Italy) Francesco Maestrelli

== Champions ==
=== Singles ===
- (Italy) Francesco Maestrelli def. (Argentina) Pedro Cachin 3–6, 6–3, 6–0.

=== Doubles ===
- (Venezuela) Luis David Martínez / (Italy) Andrea Vavassori def. (Argentina) Juan Ignacio Galarza / (Slovenia) Tomás Lipovšek Puches 7–6^{(7–4)}, 3–6, [12–10].
