= 2023 Internazionali di Tennis Città di Verona – Singles =

Singles
- 2023 Internazionali di Tennis Città di Verona

Final
- Champion: (Czech Republic) Vít Kopřiva
- Runner-up: (Ukraine) Vitaliy Sachko
- Score: 1–6, 7–6^{(7–3)}, 6–2

Events
Singles	Doubles
← 2022 ·	Internazionali di Tennis Città di Verona	· 2024 →

Francesco Maestrelli was the defending champion but chose not to defend his title.

Vít Kopřiva won the title after defeating Vitaliy Sachko 1–6, 7–6^{(7–3)}, 6–2 in the final.

== Seeds ==
1. (Belgium) David Goffin (semifinals)
2. (France) Hugo Gaston (first round, retired)
3. (Spain) Pedro Martínez (first round)
4. (France) Benoît Paire (withdrew)
5. (Italy) Francesco Passaro (quarterfinals)
6. (Australia) Marc Polmans (first round)
7. (Argentina) Camilo Ugo Carabelli (first round)
8. (Argentina) Genaro Alberto Olivieri (first round, retired)
9. (Ukraine) Vitaliy Sachko (final)

== Draw ==
=== Key ===
- Q = Qualifier
- WC = Wild card
- LL = Lucky loser
- Alt = Alternate
- ITF = ITF entry
- PR = Protected ranking
- SR = Special ranking
- SE = Special exempt
- JE = Junior exempt
- JR = Junior Accelerator Programme entrant
- CO = College Accelerator Programme entrant
- NG = Next Gen Accelerator Program entrant
- w/o = Walkover
- r = Retired
- d = Defaulted

=== Finals ===
Semifinals
1	(Belgium) David Goffin	5	4
9	(Ukraine) Vitaliy Sachko	7	6
Q	(France) Mathias Bourgue	7^{7}	3	2
Alt	(Czech Republic) Vít Kopřiva	6^{2}	6	6

Final
9	(Ukraine) Vitaliy Sachko	6	6^{3}	2
Alt	(Czech Republic) Vít Kopřiva	1	7^{7}	6

=== Top half ===
First round
1	(Belgium) D Goffin	6	6
(Bosnia and Herzegovina) N Fatić	4	3
Q	(Chinese Taipei) C-h Tseng	4	7	6
LL	(Netherlands) M Houkes	6	5	3
Alt	(Italy) S Caruso	5	2
Q	(Italy) S Napolitano	7	6
Q	(Austria) L Neumayer	7	0
8	(Argentina) GA Olivieri	5	0^{r}
9	(Ukraine) V Sachko	2	7^{7}	6
(Argentina) G Andreozzi	6	6^{5}	4
(Argentina) RA Burruchaga	5	6	6^{5}
Alt	(Lebanon) B Hassan	7	4	7^{7}
WC	(Spain) C Taberner	6	1	4
Q	(Italy) Samuel Vincent Ruggeri	1	6	6
(Argentina) F Comesaña	7^{7}	6
6	(Australia) M Polmans	6^{5}	4

Second round
1	(Belgium) D Goffin	7	6
Q	(Chinese Taipei) C-h Tseng	5	0
Q	(Italy) S Napolitano	4	6	6
Q	(Austria) L Neumayer	6	2	3
9	(Ukraine) V Sachko	6	6
Alt	(Lebanon) B Hassan	2	2
Q	(Italy) S Vincent Ruggeri	2	4
(Argentina) F Comesaña	6	6

Quarterfinals
1	(Belgium) D Goffin	1	6	6
Q	(Italy) S Napolitano	6	1	2
9	(Ukraine) V Sachko	7	6
(Argentina) F Comesaña	5	3

Semifinals
1	(Belgium) D Goffin	5	4
9	(Ukraine) V Sachko	7	6

=== Bottom half ===
First round
5	(Italy) F Passaro	6^{2}	6	6
(Italy) A Pellegrino	7^{7}	2	4
(Italy) F Gaio	6^{3}	6	6
(India) S Nagal	7^{7}	3	2
(Argentina) F Delbonis	2	7^{7}	3
WC	(Czech Republic) J Veselý	6	6^{4}	6
Q	(France) M Bourgue	5	6	6
3/WC	(Spain) P Martínez	7	2	2
7	(Argentina) C Ugo Carabelli	3	1
(Italy) Edoardo Lavagno	6	6
(Italy) L Darderi	6	6
(Dominican Republic) N Hardt	4	0
Alt	(Czech Republic) V Kopřiva	7^{8}	6
Q	(France) V Royer	6^{6}	3
(Argentina) M Trungelliti	3	6	5
2/SE	(France) H Gaston	6	2	2^{r}

Second round
5	(Italy) F Passaro	6^{11}	6	6
(Italy) F Gaio	7^{13}	4	2
WC	(Czech Republic) J Veselý	6	1	4
Q	(France) M Bourgue	3	6	6
(Italy) E Lavagno	4	3
(Italy) L Darderi	6	6
Alt	(Czech Republic) V Kopřiva	6	6
(Argentina) M Trungelliti	2	2

Quarterfinals
5	(Italy) F Passaro	4	6	4
Q	(France) M Bourgue	6	2	6
(Italy) L Darderi	6	1	0
Alt	(Czech Republic) V Kopřiva	4	6	6

Semifinals
Q	(France) M Bourgue	7^{7}	3	2
Alt	(Czech Republic) V Kopřiva	6^{2}	6	6
