= 2023 Internazionali di Tennis Città di Verona – Doubles =

Doubles
- 2023 Internazionali di Tennis Città di Verona

Final
- Champions: (Italy) Federico Gaio (Italy) Andrea Pellegrino
- Runners-up: (Brazil) Daniel Dutra da Silva (Dominican Republic) Nick Hardt
- Score: 7–6^{(8–6)}, 6–2

Events
Singles	Doubles
← 2022 ·	Internazionali di Tennis Città di Verona	· 2024 →

Luis David Martínez and Andrea Vavassori were the defending champions but chose not to defend their title.

Federico Gaio and Andrea Pellegrino won the title after defeating Daniel Dutra da Silva and Nick Hardt 7–6^{(8–6)}, 6–2 in the final.

== Seeds ==
1. (Argentina) Guido Andreozzi / (France) Jonathan Eysseric (quarterfinals)
2. (Brazil) Fernando Romboli / (Brazil) Marcelo Zormann (quarterfinals)
3. (Germany) Tim Sandkaulen / (Poland) Szymon Walków (quarterfinals)
4. (Poland) Piotr Matuszewski / (Slovakia) Igor Zelenay (semifinals)

== Draw ==
=== Key ===
- Q = Qualifier
- WC = Wild card
- LL = Lucky loser
- Alt = Alternate
- ITF = ITF entry
- PR = Protected ranking
- SR = Special ranking
- SE = Special exempt
- JE = Junior exempt
- JR = Junior Accelerator Programme entrant
- CO = College Accelerator Programme entrant
- NG = Next Gen Accelerator Program entrant
- w/o = Walkover
- r = Retired
- d = Defaulted

First round
1	(Argentina) G Andreozzi (France) J Eysseric	6	6
WC	(Argentina) Gian Matías Di Natale (Italy) Gabriele Pennaforti	1	1
(France) M Bourgue (France) V Royer	6	3	[6]
(Brazil) D Dutra da Silva (Dominican Republic) N Hardt	3	6	[10]
3	(Germany) T Sandkaulen (Poland) S Walków	6	6
(Italy) G Oradini (Italy) Samuel Vincent Ruggeri	4	2
(Argentina) RA Burruchaga (Italy) L Darderi	6	6^{5}	[10]
WC	(Italy) A Arnaboldi (Netherlands) M Vervoort	4	7^{7}	[7]
(Norway) V Durasovic (Spain) C Taberner	4	0
PR	(Romania) A Jecan (Greece) M Kalovelonis	6	6
(Austria) D Pichler (Ukraine) V Sachko	6	3	[8]
4	(Poland) P Matuszewski (Slovakia) I Zelenay	4	6	[10]
(Italy) F Gaio (Italy) A Pellegrino	3	6	[10]
(Australia) MC Romios (Australia) J Taylor	6	2	[6]
(Italy) S Napolitano (Italy) Alexander Weis	6^{6}	3
2	(Brazil) F Romboli (Brazil) M Zormann	7^{8}	6

Quarterfinals
1	(Argentina) G Andreozzi (France) J Eysseric	6^{3}	4
(Brazil) D Dutra da Silva (Dominican Republic) N Hardt	7^{7}	6
3	(Germany) T Sandkaulen (Poland) S Walków	3	5
(Argentina) RA Burruchaga (Italy) L Darderi	6	7
PR	(Romania) A Jecan (Greece) M Kalovelonis	3	2
4	(Poland) P Matuszewski (Slovakia) I Zelenay	6	6
(Italy) F Gaio (Italy) A Pellegrino	6^{4}	6	[10]
2	(Brazil) F Romboli (Brazil) M Zormann	7^{7}	1	[8]

Semifinals
(Brazil) D Dutra da Silva (Dominican Republic) N Hardt	4	6	[10]
(Argentina) RA Burruchaga (Italy) L Darderi	6	1	[3]
4	(Poland) P Matuszewski (Slovakia) I Zelenay	6^{1}	2
(Italy) F Gaio (Italy) A Pellegrino	7^{7}	6

Final
(Brazil) D Dutra da Silva (Dominican Republic) N Hardt	6^{6}	2
(Italy) F Gaio (Italy) A Pellegrino	7^{8}	6
