= 2024 Internazionali di Tennis Città di Verona – Singles =

Singles
- 2024 Internazionali di Tennis Città di Verona

Final
- Champion: (Italy) Federico Arnaboldi
- Runner-up: (Lithuania) Vilius Gaubas
- Score: 6–2, 6–2

Events
Singles	Doubles
← 2023 ·	Internazionali di Tennis Città di Verona	· 2025 →

Vít Kopřiva was the defending champion but chose not to defend his title.

Federico Arnaboldi won the title after defeating Vilius Gaubas 6–2, 6–2 in the final.

== Seeds ==
1. (Argentina) Pedro Cachín (first round)
2. (Netherlands) Jesper de Jong (quarterfinals)
3. (Italy) Stefano Napolitano (withdrew)
4. (France) Richard Gasquet (second round)
5. (Bolivia) Hugo Dellien (quarterfinals)
6. (Italy) Andrea Pellegrino (second round)
7. (Spain) Alejandro Moro Cañas (first round)
8. (France) Ugo Blanchet (second round)
9. (Germany) Henri Squire (first round)

== Draw ==
=== Key ===
- Q = Qualifier
- WC = Wild card
- LL = Lucky loser
- Alt = Alternate
- SE = Special exempt
- PR = Protected ranking
- ITF = ITF entry
- JE = Junior exempt
- w/o = Walkover
- r = Retired
- d = Defaulted
- SR = Special ranking

=== Finals ===
Semifinals
Q	(Germany) Max Hans Rehberg	2	1
Q	(Italy) Federico Arnaboldi	6	6
(Lithuania) Vilius Gaubas	4	6	7
Q	(Georgia (country)) Nikoloz Basilashvili	6	0	5

Final
Q	(Italy) Federico Arnaboldi	6	6
(Lithuania) Vilius Gaubas	2	2

=== Top half ===
First round
1	(Argentina) P Cachín	6^{3}	5
Alt	(Italy) F Maestrelli	7^{7}	7
(France) K Jacquet	2	6^{2}
(Ecuador) Á Guillén Meza	6	7^{7}
(Romania) FC Jianu	6^{4}	1
Q	(Germany) MH Rehberg	7^{7}	6
WC	(Italy) M Cecchinato	7^{7}	6^{1}	4
6	(Italy) A Pellegrino	6^{4}	7^{7}	6
9	(Germany) H Squire	7^{7}	2	5
(United Kingdom) J Choinski	6^{4}	6	7
(Peru) G Bueno	6^{7}	7	6
LL	(Brazil) M Pucinelli de Almeida	7^{9}	5	3
Q	(Italy) F Arnaboldi	6	6
Q	(Bulgaria) P Nesterov	3	4
(Bosnia and Herzegovina) N Fatić	3	6^{2}
8	(France) U Blanchet	6	7^{7}

Second round
Alt	(Italy) F Maestrelli	4	6	3
(Ecuador) Á Guillén Meza	6	3	6
Q	(Germany) MH Rehberg	3	7	6
6	(Italy) A Pellegrino	6	5	1
(United Kingdom) J Choinski	2	6	0
(Peru) G Bueno	6	4	6
Q	(Italy) F Arnaboldi	6	2	6
8	(France) U Blanchet	4	6	0

Quarterfinals
(Ecuador) Á Guillén Meza	4	6	5
Q	(Germany) MH Rehberg	6	3	7
(Peru) G Bueno	2	4
Q	(Italy) F Arnaboldi	6	6

Semifinals
Q	(Germany) MH Rehberg	2	1
Q	(Italy) F Arnaboldi	6	6

=== Bottom half ===
First round
5	(Bolivia) H Dellien	6^{2}	7	6
(Italy) S Travaglia	7^{7}	5	1
Q	(Italy) Andrea Picchione	4	4
PR	(Serbia) F Krajinović	6	6
(Lithuania) V Gaubas	4	7	6
(Italy) E Dalla Valle	6	5	1
(Italy) Samuel Vincent Ruggeri	0	6	2
4	(France) R Gasquet	6	3	6
7	(Spain) A Moro Cañas	6	2	3
(Italy) J Berrettini	3	6	6
(Bulgaria) A Andreev	1	0^{r}
Q	(Georgia (country)) N Basilashvili	6	0
WC	(Italy) Lorenzo Sciahbasi	1	1
Q	(Brazil) JL Reis da Silva	6	6
Alt	(Italy) G Mager	4	5
2	(Netherlands) J de Jong	6	7

Second round
5	(Bolivia) H Dellien	7^{7}	6
PR	(Serbia) F Krajinović	6^{2}	3
(Lithuania) V Gaubas	7^{7}	4	7^{8}
4	(France) R Gasquet	6^{3}	6	6^{6}
(Italy) J Berrettini	3	3
Q	(Georgia (country)) N Basilashvili	6	6
Q	(Brazil) JL Reis da Silva	4	1
2	(Netherlands) J de Jong	6	6

Quarterfinals
5	(Bolivia) H Dellien	3	6	3
(Lithuania) V Gaubas	6	1	6
Q	(Georgia (country)) N Basilashvili	6	4	6
2	(Netherlands) J de Jong	4	6	1

Semifinals
(Lithuania) V Gaubas	4	6	7
Q	(Georgia (country)) N Basilashvili	6	0	5
