= 2022 Internazionali di Tennis Città di Verona – Singles =

Singles
- 2022 Internazionali di Tennis Città di Verona

Final
- Champion: (Italy) Francesco Maestrelli
- Runner-up: (Argentina) Pedro Cachin
- Score: 3–6, 6–3, 6–0

Events
| Singles | Doubles |
| ← 2021 · | Internazionali di Tennis Città di Verona | · 2023 → |

Holger Rune was the defending champion but chose not to defend his title.

Francesco Maestrelli won the title after defeating Pedro Cachin 3–6, 6–3, 6–0 in the final.

== Seeds ==
1. (Argentina) Pedro Cachin (final)
2. (Slovakia) Norbert Gombos (quarterfinals)
3. (Italy) Gianluca Mager (first round)
4. (Italy) Franco Agamenone (second round)
5. (Italy) Flavio Cobolli (quarterfinals)
6. (Serbia) Nikola Milojević (first round)
7. (France) Alexandre Müller (second round)
8. (Italy) Marco Cecchinato (semifinals)

== Draw ==
=== Key ===
- Q = Qualifier
- WC = Wild card
- LL = Lucky loser
- Alt = Alternate
- ITF = ITF entry
- PR = Protected ranking
- SR = Special ranking
- SE = Special exempt
- JE = Junior exempt
- JR = Junior Accelerator Programme entrant
- CO = College Accelerator Programme entrant
- NG = Next Gen Accelerator Program entrant
- w/o = Walkover
- r = Retired
- d = Defaulted

=== Finals ===
Semifinals
1 | (Argentina) Pedro Cachin | 6^{12} | 6 | 7
8/WC | (Italy) Marco Cecchinato | 7^{14} | 0 | 5
Q | (Italy) Francesco Maestrelli | 6 | 6^{6} | 6
Alt | (Austria) Sebastian Ofner | 4 | 7^{8} | 3

Final
1 | (Argentina) Pedro Cachin | 6 | 3 | 0
Q | (Italy) Francesco Maestrelli | 3 | 6 | 6

=== Top half ===
First round
1 | (Argentina) P Cachin | 6 | 7
(Croatia) N Serdarušić | 4 | 5
Q | (Italy) M Bellucci | 7 | 6
(Italy) F Gaio | 5 | 4
WC | (Australia) B Tomic | 4 | 6^{1}
Q | (Switzerland) J Kym | 6 | 7^{7}
(Argentina) S Rodríguez Taverna | 1 | 2^{r}
7 | (France) A Müller | 6 | 4
4 | (Italy) F Agamenone | 6 | 6
(Italy) S Caruso | 3 | 4
Alt | (Italy) A Vavassori | 6 | 4 | 4
(Slovakia) F Horanský | 2 | 6 | 6
(Kazakhstan) D Popko | 1 | 6 | 2
Q | (Italy) R Brancaccio | 6 | 4 | 6
(Argentina) TA Tirante | 5 | 3
8/WC | (Italy) M Cecchinato | 7 | 6

Second round
1 | (Argentina) P Cachin | 6 | 6
Q | (Italy) M Bellucci | 3 | 4
Q | (Switzerland) J Kym | 6 | 6
7 | (France) A Müller | 2 | 4
4 | (Italy) F Agamenone | 6 | 3 | 4
(Slovakia) F Horanský | 3 | 6 | 6
Q | (Italy) R Brancaccio | 3 | 6 | 2
8/WC | (Italy) M Cecchinato | 6 | 1 | 6

Quarterfinals
1 | (Argentina) P Cachin | 5 | 7^{7} | 6
Q | (Switzerland) J Kym | 7 | 6^{4} | 4
(Slovakia) F Horanský | 1 | 2
8/WC | (Italy) M Cecchinato | 6 | 6

Semifinals
1 | (Argentina) P Cachin | 6^{12} | 6 | 7
8/WC | (Italy) M Cecchinato | 7^{14} | 0 | 5

=== Bottom half ===
First round
5 | (Italy) F Cobolli | 6 | 1 | 6
(Italy) A Arnaboldi | 4 | 6 | 3
(Italy) A Pellegrino | 6 | 6
Q | (Brazil) P Boscardin Dias | 4 | 2
(France) G Simon | 3 | 2
Q | (Italy) F Maestrelli | 6 | 6
(Italy) R Bonadio | 6 | 3 | 6
3 | (Italy) G Mager | 4 | 6 | 1
6 | (Serbia) N Milojević | 0 | 4
Alt | (Germany) C-M Stebe | 6 | 6
(Italy) A Giannessi | 3 | 3
Alt | (Austria) S Ofner | 6 | 6
Q | (Italy) M Gigante | 6 | 3 | 7^{7}
(Italy) L Nardi | 4 | 6 | 6^{0}
WC | (Italy) G Zeppieri | 6^{9} | 4
2 | (Slovakia) N Gombos | 7^{11} | 6

Second round
5 | (Italy) F Cobolli | 7 | 1 | 6
(Italy) A Pellegrino | 5 | 6 | 2
Q | (Italy) F Maestrelli | 3 | 7^{8} | 6
(Italy) R Bonadio | 6 | 6^{6} | 2
Alt | (Germany) C-M Stebe | 4 | 6^{5}
Alt | (Austria) S Ofner | 6 | 7^{7}
Q | (Italy) M Gigante | 6^{2} | 4
2 | (Slovakia) N Gombos | 7^{7} | 6

Quarterfinals
5 | (Italy) F Cobolli | 3 | 2
Q | (Italy) F Maestrelli | 6 | 6
Alt | (Austria) S Ofner | 3 | 7^{7} | 6
2 | (Slovakia) N Gombos | 6 | 6^{3} | 3

Semifinals
Q | (Italy) F Maestrelli | 6 | 6^{6} | 6
Alt | (Austria) S Ofner | 4 | 7^{8} | 3
