= 2024 Internazionali di Tennis Città di Verona =

- Date: 22–28 July
- Edition: 4th
- Surface: Clay
- Location: Verona, Italy

Champions

Singles
- (Italy) Federico Arnaboldi

Doubles
- (Brazil) Marcelo Demoliner / (Argentina) Guillermo Durán
← 2023 ·	Internazionali di Tennis Città di Verona	· 2025 →

The 2024 Internazionali di Tennis Città di Verona was a professional tennis tournament played on clay courts. It was the fourth edition of the tournament which was part of the 2024 ATP Challenger Tour. It took place in Verona, Italy between 22 and 28 July 2024.

== Singles main draw entrants ==
=== Seeds ===
Country	Player	Rank^{1}	Seed
ARG	Pedro Cachín	110	1
NED	Jesper de Jong	114	2
~~ITA~~	~~Stefano Napolitano~~	~~125~~	~~3~~
FRA	Richard Gasquet	132	4
BOL	Hugo Dellien	140	5
ITA	Andrea Pellegrino	153	6
ESP	Alejandro Moro Cañas	158	7
FRA	Ugo Blanchet	161	8
GER	Henri Squire	169	9

- ^{1} Rankings as of 15 July 2024.

=== Other entrants ===
The following players received wildcards into the singles main draw:

- (Italy) Jacopo Berrettini
- (Italy) Marco Cecchinato
- (Italy) Lorenzo Sciahbasi

The following player received entry into the singles main draw using a protected ranking:

- (Serbia) Filip Krajinović

The following players received entry into the singles main draw as alternates:

- (Italy) Francesco Maestrelli
- (Italy) Gianluca Mager

The following players received entry from the qualifying draw:

- (Italy) Federico Arnaboldi
- (Georgia (country)) Nikoloz Basilashvili
- (Bulgaria) Petr Nesterov
- (Italy) Andrea Picchione
- (Germany) Max Hans Rehberg
- (Brazil) João Lucas Reis da Silva

The following player received entry as a lucky loser:

- (Brazil) Matheus Pucinelli de Almeida

== Champions ==
=== Singles ===
- (Italy) Federico Arnaboldi def. (Lithuania) Vilius Gaubas 6–2, 6–2.

=== Doubles ===
- (Brazil) Marcelo Demoliner / (Argentina) Guillermo Durán def. (Bulgaria) Yanaki Milev / (Bulgaria) Petr Nesterov 6–7^{(6–8)}, 7–6^{(7–3)}, [15–13].
