= 2024 Internazionali di Tennis Città di Verona – Doubles =

Doubles
- 2024 Internazionali di Tennis Città di Verona

Final
- Champions: (Brazil) Marcelo Demoliner (Argentina) Guillermo Durán
- Runners-up: (Bulgaria) Yanaki Milev (Bulgaria) Petr Nesterov
- Score: 6–7^{(6–8)}, 7–6^{(7–3)}, [15–13]

Events
Singles	Doubles
- Internazionali di Tennis Città di Verona

Federico Gaio and Andrea Pellegrino were the defending champions but chose not to defend their title.

Marcelo Demoliner and Guillermo Durán won the title after defeating Yanaki Milev and Petr Nesterov 6–7^{(6–8)}, 7–6^{(7–3)}, [15–13] in the final.

== Seeds ==
1. (Poland) Karol Drzewiecki / (Poland) Piotr Matuszewski (semifinals)
2. (Brazil) Marcelo Demoliner / (Argentina) Guillermo Durán (champions)
3. (Sweden) Filip Bergevi / (Netherlands) Mick Veldheer (first round)
4. (Brazil) Daniel Dutra da Silva / (Argentina) Gonzalo Villanueva (quarterfinals)

== Draw ==
Key

- Q = Qualifier
- WC = Wild card
- LL = Lucky loser
- Alt = Alternate
- ITF = ITF entry
- PR = Protected ranking
- SR = Special ranking
- SE = Special exempt
- JE = Junior exempt
- JR = Junior Accelerator Programme entrant
- CO = College Accelerator Programme entrant
- NG = Next Gen Accelerator Program entrant
- w/o = Walkover
- r = Retired
- d = Defaulted

=== Draw ===
First round
1	(Poland) K Drzewiecki (Poland) P Matuszewski	6	6
(Italy) F Maestrelli (Italy) Samuel Vincent Ruggeri	0	4
(Peru) G Bueno (Ecuador) Á Guillén Meza	6	5	[10]
(Italy) G Ricca (Italy) Marcello Serafini	2	7	[7]
3	(Sweden) F Bergevi (Netherlands) M Veldheer	5	7^{7}	[7]
(Bulgaria) Y Milev (Bulgaria) P Nesterov	7	6^{5}	[10]
WC	(Italy) Tommaso Compagnucci (Italy) Mariano Tammaro	5	3
WC	(Italy) Luca Giacomini (Italy) Lorenzo Sciahbasi	7	6
(Italy) F Romano (Italy) Augusto Virgili	2	2
(Brazil) M Pucinelli de Almeida (Brazil) JL Reis da Silva	6	6
(Australia) B Bayldon (Netherlands) M Hermans	7^{7}	3	[2]
4	(Brazil) D Dutra da Silva (Argentina) G Villanueva	6^{4}	6	[10]
(Bosnia and Herzegovina) N Fatić (Romania) FC Jianu	1	6	[10]
(Pakistan) A-u-H Qureshi (Spain) D Vega Hernández	6	1	[4]
(Uruguay) I Carou (Spain) B Pujol Navarro	2	2
2	(Brazil) M Demoliner (Argentina) G Durán	6	6

Quarterfinals
1	(Poland) K Drzewiecki (Poland) P Matuszewski	w/o
(Peru) G Bueno (Ecuador) Á Guillén Meza
(Bulgaria) Y Milev (Bulgaria) P Nesterov	7^{12}	6
WC	(Italy) L Giacomini (Italy) L Sciahbasi	6^{10}	4
(Brazil) M Pucinelli de Almeida (Brazil) JL Reis da Silva	6^{2}	6	[10]
4	(Brazil) D Dutra da Silva (Argentina) G Villanueva	7^{7}	0	[7]
(Bosnia and Herzegovina) N Fatić (Romania) FC Jianu	5	4
2	(Brazil) M Demoliner (Argentina) G Durán	7	6

Semifinals
1	(Poland) K Drzewiecki (Poland) P Matuszewski	6	6^{5}	[5]
(Bulgaria) Y Milev (Bulgaria) P Nesterov	4	7^{7}	[10]
(Brazil) M Pucinelli de Almeida (Brazil) JL Reis da Silva	3	4
2	(Brazil) M Demoliner (Argentina) G Durán	6	6

Final
(Bulgaria) Y Milev (Bulgaria) P Nesterov	7^{8}	6^{3}	[13]
2	(Brazil) M Demoliner (Argentina) G Durán	6^{6}	7^{7}	[15]
