= 2023 Internazionali di Tennis Città di Verona =

- Date: 24–30 July
- Edition: 3rd
- Surface: Clay
- Location: Verona, Italy

Champions

Singles
- (Czech Republic) Vít Kopřiva

Doubles
- (Italy) Federico Gaio / (Italy) Andrea Pellegrino
← 2022 ·	Internazionali di Tennis Città di Verona	· 2024 →

The 2023 Internazionali di Tennis Città di Verona was a professional tennis tournament played on clay courts. It was the third edition of the tournament which was part of the 2023 ATP Challenger Tour. It took place in Verona, Italy between 24 and 30 July 2023.

== Singles main draw entrants ==
=== Seeds ===
Country	Player	Rank^{1}	Seed
BEL	David Goffin	111	1
FRA	Hugo Gaston	120	2
ESP	Pedro Martínez	127	3
~~FRA~~	~~Benoît Paire~~	~~131~~	~~4~~
ITA	Francesco Passaro	156	5
AUS	Marc Polmans	170	6
ARG	Camilo Ugo Carabelli	178	7
ARG	Genaro Alberto Olivieri	179	8
UKR	Vitaliy Sachko	187	9

- ^{1} Rankings as of 17 July 2023.

=== Other entrants ===
The following players received wildcards into the singles main draw:

- (Spain) Pedro Martínez
- (Spain) Carlos Taberner
- (Czech Republic) Jiří Veselý

The following player received entry into the singles main draw as a special exempt:

- (France) Hugo Gaston

The following players received entry into the singles main draw as alternates:

- (Italy) Salvatore Caruso
- (Lebanon) Benjamin Hassan
- (Czech Republic) Vít Kopřiva

The following players received entry from the qualifying draw:

- (France) Mathias Bourgue
- (Italy) Stefano Napolitano
- (Austria) Lukas Neumayer
- (France) Valentin Royer
- (Chinese Taipei) Tseng Chun-hsin
- (Italy) Samuel Vincent Ruggeri

The following player received entry as a lucky loser:

- (Netherlands) Max Houkes

== Champions ==
=== Singles ===
- (Czech Republic) Vít Kopřiva def. (Ukraine) Vitaliy Sachko 1–6, 7–6^{(7–3)}, 6–2.

=== Doubles ===
- (Italy) Federico Gaio / (Italy) Andrea Pellegrino def. (Brazil) Daniel Dutra da Silva / (Dominican Republic) Nick Hardt 7–6^{(8–6)}, 6–2.
