= Moez Echargui =

Tunisian tennis player (born 1993)

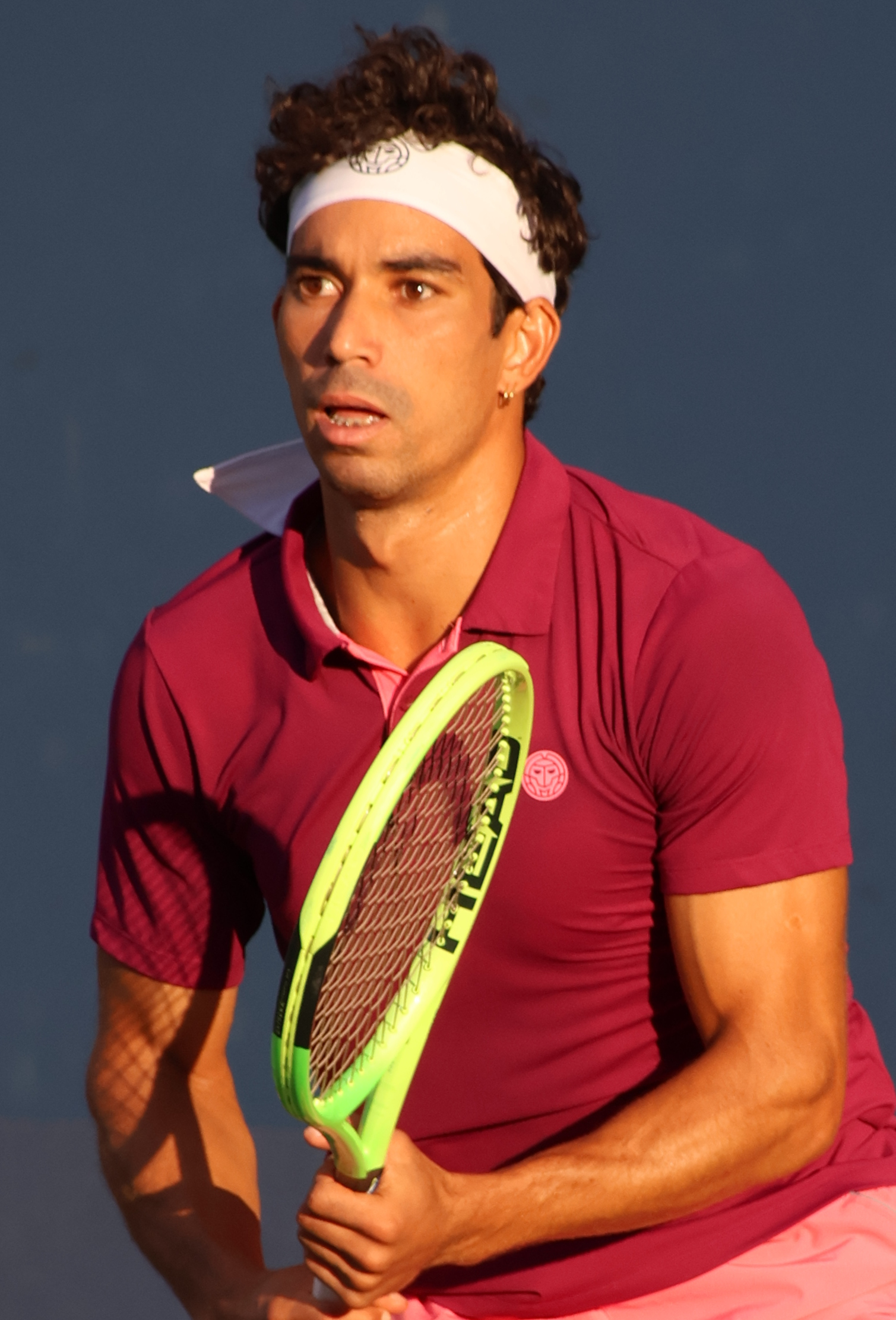
- Echargui at the 2026 US Open
- Country (sports): Tunisia
- Residence: Milan, Italy
- Born: 10 January 1993 (age 33) La Marsa, Tunisia
- Height: 1.78 m (5 ft 10 in)
- Turned pro: 2016
- Plays: Right-handed (two-handed backhand)
- College: University of Nevada
- Coach: Paolo Moretti, Marco Brigo (MXP Academy), Fabio Silvestri
- Prize money: US $640,014

Singles
- Career record: 7–10 (at ATP Tour level, Grand Slam level, and in Davis Cup)
- Career titles: 3 Challenger
- Highest ranking: No. 134 (29 December 2025)
- Current ranking: No. 351 (16 november 2026)

Grand Slam singles results
- Australian Open: Q1 (2026)
- French Open: Q1 (2026)
- Wimbledon: Q3 (2026)
- US Open: Q1 (2026)

Other tournaments
- Olympic Games: 1R (2024)

Doubles
- Career record: 1–5 (at ATP Tour level, Grand Slam level, and in Davis Cup)
- Career titles: 1 ATP Challenger
- Highest ranking: No. 362 (27 May 2019)
- Current ranking: No. 1497 (16 november 2026)

Team competitions
- Davis Cup: 6–7
Medal record
Representing Tunisia
Men's Tennis
African Games
Gold medal – first place	2023 Accra	Singles
Gold medal – first place	2023 Accra	Team
Bronze medal – third place	2023 Accra	Doubles
- Last updated on: 16 november 2026.

Moez Echargui (born 10 January 1993) is a Tunisian tennis player. He has a career high ATP singles ranking of world No. 134 achieved on 29 December 2025 and a career high ATP doubles ranking of No. 362 achieved on 27 May 2019. He is currently the No. 1 African and No. 1 Tunisian player.

Echargui represents Tunisia at the Davis Cup where he has a W/L record of 6–7.

== Career ==
Echargui qualified for the singles competition at the 2024 Summer Olympics in Paris, after competing in the African Games and claiming the gold earlier in the year.

At the age of 32 and six months, Echargui won his first ATP Challenger title at the 2025 Porto Open as a qualifier, defeating Francesco Maestrelli and becoming the second oldest first-time champion on the Challenger Tour and the second-ever champion from Tunisia. As a result, he reached a new career-high singles ranking of world No. 211 on 4 August 2025. Following an M25 ITF title at home in Monastir, Tunisia he reached the top 200 in the singles rankings on 18 August 2025, becoming the Tunisian No. 1 player. And then he went on to win also a Challenger in Hersonissos, making up for a win strikes of 17 consecutive matches.

In September 2025, Moez Echargui won the biggest title of his career at the Challenger 125 2025 Saint-Tropez Open, defeating alternate Dan Added in straight sets in the final for a second time at a Challenger level. As a result, he reached the top 150 in the singles rankings on 22 September 2025.

He made his ATP main draw debut at the 2025 Moselle Open in Metz, the third oldest player to achieve the feat since 1990 (does not include Davis Cup or Olympics), being promoted to start directly into the second round as a lucky loser, replacing second seed Daniil Medvedev.

== Performance timeline ==
Key
W	F	SF	QF	#R	RR	Q#	DNQ	A	NH

(W) winner; (F) finalist; (SF) semifinalist; (QF) quarterfinalist; (#R) rounds 4, 3, 2, 1; (RR) round-robin stage; (Q#) qualification round; (DNQ) did not qualify; (A) absent; (NH) not held; (SR) strike rate (events won / competed); (W–L) win–loss record.
To avoid confusion and double counting, these charts are updated at the conclusion of a tournament or when the player's participation has ended.

=== Singles ===
Tournament	2026	SR	W–L	Win %
Grand Slam tournaments
Australian Open	Q1	0 / 0	0–0	–
French Open	A	0 / 0	0–0	–
Wimbledon	A	0 / 0	0–0	–
US Open	A	0 / 0	0–0	–
Win–loss	0–0	0 / 0	0–0	–
ATP Masters 1000
Indian Wells Masters	Q1	0 / 0	0–0	–
Miami Open	Q1	0 / 0	0–0	–
Monte Carlo Masters	A	0 / 0	0–0	–
Madrid Open	Q2	0 / 0	0–0	–
Italian Open	Q1	0 / 0	0–0	–
Canadian Open	A	0 / 0	0–0	–
Cincinnati Masters	A	0 / 0	0–0	–
Shanghai Masters	A	0 / 0	0–0	–
Paris Masters	A	0 / 0	0–0	–
Win–loss	0–0	0 / 0	0–0	–

== ATP Challenger and ITF Tour finals ==
=== Singles: 26 (16 titles, 10 runner-ups) ===
Legend ATP Challenger Tour (3–0) ITF Futures/World Tennis Tour (13–10)	Finals by surface Hard (15–6) Clay (1–4)

Result	W–L	Date	Tournament	Tier	Surface	Opponent	Score
Loss	0–1	Apr 2017	Egypt F15, Sharm El Sheikh	Futures	Hard	(Canada) Filip Peliwo	3–6, 4–6
Win	1–1	Jun 2017	Tunisia F23, Hammamet	Futures	Clay	(Spain) Eduard Esteve Lobato	7–6^{(7–2)}, 6–3
Win	2–1	Mar 2018	Tunisia F8, Jerba	Futures	Hard	(France) Alexandre Müller	7–6^{(7–5)}, 2–6, 6–1
Win	3–1	May 2018	Tunisia F19, Jerba	Futures	Hard	(Spain) Pablo Vivero González	6–0, 6–1
Loss	3–2	May 2018	Tunisia F20, Jerba	Futures	Hard	(United States) Hady Habib	6–7^{(6–8)}, 4–6
Win	4–2	Jun 2018	Tunisia F21, Jerba	Futures	Hard	(United States) Vasil Kirkov	6–4, 6–3
Loss	4–3	Aug 2018	Serbia F3, Novi Sad	Futures	Clay	(Serbia) Marko Miladinović	3–6, 4–6
Loss	4–4	Sep 2018	Tunisia F29, La Marsa	Futures	Clay	(Italy) Fabrizio Ornago	6–4, 2–6, 0–6
Loss	4–5	Sep 2019	M15 Tabarka, Tunisia	World Tennis Tour	Clay	(France) Thomas Laurent	0–6, 1–6
Loss	4–6	Oct 2021	M15, Monastir, Tunisia	World Tennis Tour	Hard	(Argentina) Mateo Nicolas Martinez	4–6 ret.
Win	5–6	Nov 2021	M15, Monastir, Tunisia	World Tennis Tour	Hard	(France) Clement Tabur	6–1, 6–2
Win	6–6	Jan 2022	M25, Monastir, Tunisia	World Tennis Tour	Hard	(France) Laurent Lokoli	6–4, 7–5
Loss	6–7	Jul 2022	M25, Bacau, Romania	World Tennis Tour	Clay	(United States) Oliver Crawford	6–2, 3–6, 5–7
Win	7–7	Jan 2023	M15, Monastir, Tunisia	World Tennis Tour	Hard	(North Macedonia) Kalin Ivanovski	3–6, 6–3, 7–6^{(7–5)}
Loss	7–8	Feb 2023	M25, Monastir, Tunisia	World Tennis Tour	Hard	(United States) Oliver Crawford	6–2, 4–6, 1–6
Loss	7–9	Feb 2023	M25, Monastir, Tunisia	World Tennis Tour	Hard	(Italy) Fausto Tabacco	2–6, 3–6
Win	8–9	Mar 2023	M15, Monastir, Tunisia	World Tennis Tour	Hard	(France) Adrien Gobat	6–0, 7–6^{(7–3)}
Win	9–9	Jan 2025	M15, Monastir, Tunisia	World Tennis Tour	Hard	(Belgium) Gilles Arnaud Bailly	3–6, 6–4, 7–5
Win	10–9	Feb 2025	M15, Monastir, Tunisia	World Tennis Tour	Hard	(France) Nicolas Tepmahc	6–3, 6–2
Loss	10–10	Apr 2025	M15, Monastir, Tunisia	World Tennis Tour	Hard	(Latvia) Robert Strombachs	1–6, 6–3, 3–6
Win	11–10	Jun 2025	M15, Monastir, Tunisia	World Tennis Tour	Hard	(Turkey) Mert Alkaya	6–1, 6–1
Win	12–10	Jun 2025	M25, Monastir, Tunisia	World Tennis Tour	Hard	(Portugal) Tiago Pereira	6–3, 6–4
Win	13–10	Jun 2025	M25, Monastir, Tunisia	World Tennis Tour	Hard	(Tunisia) Aziz Dougaz	6–4, 6–3
Win	14–10	Aug 2025	Porto Open, Portugal	Challenger	Hard	(Italy) Francesco Maestrelli	6–3, 6–2
Win	15–10	Aug 2025	Hersonissos IV, Greece	Challenger	Hard	(France) Dan Added	5–7, 6–4, 3–0 Ret.
Win	16–10	Sep 2025	Saint Tropez, France	Challenger	Hard	(France) Dan Added	6–3, 6–4

=== Doubles: 19 (8–11) ===
Legend (doubles) ATP Challenger Tour (1–0) ITF Futures Tour (7–11)	Finals by surface Hard (4–5) Clay (4–6)

Result	W–L	Date	Tournament	Tier	Surface	Partner	Opponents	Score
Loss	0–1	May 2014	Tunisia F2, Sousse	Futures	Hard	(Tunisia) Slim Hamza	(Republic of Ireland) Sam Barry (Italy) Claudio Grassi	4–6, 6–7^{(2–7)}
Loss	0–2	Dec 2015	Tunisia F36, El Kantaoui	Futures	Hard	(Tunisia) Skander Mansouri	(France) Antoine Hoang (France) Ronan Joncour	6–7^{(6–8)}, 6–7^{(0–7)}
Loss	0–3	May 2017	Nigeria F3, Abuja	Futures	Hard	(Zimbabwe) Mark Fynn	(Brazil) Fabiano de Paula (Brazil) Fernando Romboli	6–3, 3–6, [14–16]
Loss	0–4	Jun 2017	Tunisia F22, Hammamet	Futures	Clay	(Portugal) Gonçalo Oliveira	(Tunisia) Aziz Dougaz (Tunisia) Skander Mansouri	6–7^{(4–7)}, 1–6
Loss	0–5	Nov 2017	Tunisia F35, Hammamet	Futures	Clay	(Tunisia) Anis Ghorbel	(Serbia) Nikola Čačić (Croatia) Nino Serdarušić	5–7, 3–6
Loss	0–6	Jan 2018	Egypt F2, Sharm El Sheikh	Futures	Hard	(Tunisia) Anis Ghorbel	(Netherlands) Thiemo de Bakker (Netherlands) Michiel de Krom	3–6, 4–6
Win	1–6	Aug 2018	Serbia F2, Novi Sad	Futures	Clay	(Hungary) Péter Nagy	(Bulgaria) Gabriel Donev (Bulgaria) Plamen Milushev	5–7, 6–4, [10–6]
Loss	1–7	Aug 2018	Serbia F3, Novi Sad	Futures	Clay	(France) Yanais Laurent	(Brazil) Caio Silva (Brazil) Thales Turini	1–6, 6–2, [9–11]
Win	2–7	Mar 2019	Yokohama, Japan	Challenger	Hard	(Tunisia) Skander Mansouri	(Australia) Max Purcell (Australia) Luke Saville	7–6^{(8–6)}, 6–7^{(3–7)}, [10–7]
Loss	2–8	Sep 2019	M25 La Marsa, Tunisia	World Tennis Tour	Clay	(France) Thomas Setodji	(Tunisia) Aziz Dougaz (Tunisia) Skander Mansouri	2–6, 6–4, [8–10]
Win	3–8	Sep 2019	M15 Tabarka, Tunisia	World Tennis Tour	Clay	(France) Thomas Setodji	(Germany) Henri Squire (Germany) Paul Wörner	6–2, 6–4
Loss	3–9	Jan 2020	M15 Monastir, Tunisia	World Tennis Tour	Hard	(Tunisia) Aziz Dougaz	(Russia) Artem Dubrivnyy (Kazakhstan) Timur Khabibulin	5–7, 3–6
Win	4–9	Feb 2020	M15 Monastir, Tunisia	World Tennis Tour	Hard	(Tunisia) Anis Ghorbel	(Bosnia and Herzegovina) Aziz Kijametović (Morocco) Adam Moundir	7–5, 6–4
Win	5–9	Mar 2020	M15 Monastir, Tunisia	World Tennis Tour	Hard	(Tunisia) Anis Ghorbel	(France) Quentin Folliot (France) Hugo Pontico	6–0, 6–2
Win	6–9	Feb 2021	M15 Monastir, Tunisia	World Tennis Tour	Hard	(France) Jean Thirouin	(Tunisia) Anis Ghorbel (Slovenia) Tom Kocevar-Desman	7–5, 6–0
Win	7–9	Aug 2021	M25 Bacau, Romania	World Tennis Tour	Clay	(Moldova) Ilya Snitari	(Romania) Vladimir Filip (Sweden) Dragos Nicolae Madaras	7–5, 6–3
Win	8–9	Aug 2021	M25 Trier, Germany	World Tennis Tour	Clay	(France) Quentin Folliot	(Germany) Kai Wehnelt (Germany) Patrick Zahraj	1–6, 6–2, [10–8]
Loss	8–10	Mar 2022	M25 Antalya, Turkey	World Tennis Tour	Clay	(Italy) Alexander Weis	(Uzbekistan) Sanjar Fayziev (Greece) Markos Kalovelonis	2–6, 4–6
Loss	8–11	Jun 2022	M25 Skopje, North Macedonia	World Tennis Tour	Clay	(Sweden) Filip Bergevi	(Sweden) Simon Freund (Denmark) Johannes Ingildsen	5–7, 3–6

== Davis Cup ==
=== Participations: (3–4) ===
Group membership World Group (0–0) WG Play-off (0–0) Group I (0–0) Group II (3–4) Group III (0–0) Group IV (0–0)	Matches by surface Hard (3–4) Clay (0–0) Grass (0–0) Carpet (0–0)	Matches by type Singles (2–3) Doubles (1–1)

- ▲ ▼ indicates the outcome of the Davis Cup match followed by the score, date, place of event, the zonal classification and its phase, and the court surface.

Rubber outcome	No.	Rubber	Match type (partner if any)	Opponent nation	Opponent player(s)	Score
▲3–2; 15–17 July 2016; Tennis Courts of Cité Nationale Sportive, Tunis, Tunisia; Europe/Africa Zone Relegation play-off; Hard surface
Defeat	1	IV	Singles	Bulgaria	Vasko Mladenov	7–6^{(7–5)}, 5–7, 6–7^{(5–7)}
▲4–1; 7–9 April 2017; National Tennis Centre, Nicosia, Cyprus; Europe/Africa Relegation play-off; Hard surface
Victory	2	II	Singles	Cyprus	Marcos Baghdatis	7–5, 7–6^{(7–2)}, 4–6, 4–6, 6–1
Victory	3	V	Singles (dead rubber)	Cyprus	Eleftherios Neos	6–3, 6–2
▼2–3; 3–4 February 2018; Tennis Courts of Cité Nationale Sportive, Tunis, Tunisia; Europe/Africa Zone First round; Hard surface
Defeat	4	V	Singles	Finland	Harri Heliövaara	6–3, 4–6, 4–6
▼2–3; 7–8 April 2018; Tere Tennisekeskus, Tallinn, Estonia; Europe/Africa Relegation play-off; Hard surface
Defeat	5	II	Singles	Estonia	Jürgen Zopp	1–6, 1–6
Defeat	6	III	Doubles (with Malek Jaziri)	Estonia	Kenneth Raisma / Jürgen Zopp	3–6, 4–6
▲3–1; 6–7 March 2020; Federación Nacional De Tenis, Guatemala City, Guatemala; World Group II play-off First round; Hard surface
Victory	7	III	Doubles (with Malek Jaziri)	Guatemala	Kenneth Raisma / Jürgen Zopp	7–6^{(7–4)}, 7–5
