= 2021 Internazionali di Tennis Città di Verona – Singles =

Singles
- 2021 Internazionali di Tennis Città di Verona

Final
- Champion: (Denmark) Holger Rune
- Runner-up: (Croatia) Nino Serdarušić
- Score: 6–4, 6–2

Events
Singles	Doubles
- Internazionali di Tennis Città di Verona

This was the first edition of the tournament.

Holger Rune won the title after defeating Nino Serdarušić 6–4, 6–2 in the final.

== Seeds ==
1. (Spain) Carlos Taberner (semifinals)
2. (Kazakhstan) Dmitry Popko (quarterfinals)
3. (Italy) Paolo Lorenzi (second round)
4. (Denmark) Holger Rune (champion)
5. (United Kingdom) Jay Clarke (semifinals)
6. (France) Maxime Janvier (quarterfinals)
7. (Italy) Lorenzo Giustino (first round)
8. (Portugal) Gastão Elias (quarterfinals)

== Draw ==
Key

- Q = Qualifier
- WC = Wild card
- LL = Lucky loser
- Alt = Alternate
- ITF = ITF entry
- PR = Protected ranking
- SR = Special ranking
- SE = Special exempt
- JE = Junior exempt
- JR = Junior Accelerator Programme entrant
- CO = College Accelerator Programme entrant
- NG = Next Gen Accelerator Program entrant
- w/o = Walkover
- r = Retired
- d = Defaulted

=== Finals ===
Semifinals
1	(Spain) Carlos Taberner	2	1
4	(Denmark) Holger Rune	6	6
(Croatia) Nino Serdarušić	6	6
5	(United Kingdom) Jay Clarke	1	1

Final
4	(Denmark) Holger Rune	6	6
(Croatia) Nino Serdarušić	4	2

=== Top half ===
First round
1	(Spain) C Taberner	6	7^{7}
(Netherlands) J de Jong	3	6^{1}
(Russia) P Kotov	6	6
WC	(Italy) M Bortolotti	3	3
(Russia) T Gabashvili	6^{3}	6	7^{7}
(Netherlands) T van Rijthoven	7^{7}	2	6^{4}
(France) M Guinard	4	7^{7}	6^{6}
6	(France) M Janvier	6	6^{4}	7^{8}
4	(Denmark) H Rune	6	7^{7}
Q	(Croatia) M Pecotić	2	6^{3}
(Tunisia) M Jaziri	4	1
Q	(Brazil) M Pucinelli de Almeida	6	6
Q	(Bosnia and Herzegovina) N Fatić	6	6
(Italy) M Viola	0	1
(Italy) R Bonadio	4	6	6
7	(Italy) L Giustino	6	4	4

Second round
1	(Spain) C Taberner	6	4	6
(Russia) P Kotov	2	6	1
(Russia) T Gabashvili	2	2
6	(France) M Janvier	6	6
4	(Denmark) H Rune	6	6
Q	(Brazil) M Pucinelli de Almeida	2	3
Q	(Bosnia and Herzegovina) N Fatić	1	4
(Italy) R Bonadio	6	6

Quarterfinals
1	(Spain) C Taberner	6	6
6	(France) M Janvier	2	2
4	(Denmark) H Rune	6	6
(Italy) R Bonadio	3	2

Semifinals
1	(Spain) C Taberner	2	1
4	(Denmark) H Rune	6	6

=== Bottom half ===
First round
8	(Portugal) G Elias	6	6
(Italy) A Arnaboldi	2	4
Q	(Italy) F Forti	6	7
WC	(United States) Fletcher Scott	1	5
(Croatia) N Serdarušić	6	6
Alt	(Italy) F Baldi	3	2
(Portugal) G Oliveira	3	3
3	(Italy) P Lorenzi	6	6
5	(United Kingdom) J Clarke	6	6
(Colombia) N Mejía	3	4
(Ecuador) R Quiroz	6	0	6
(Chinese Taipei) C-h Tseng	2	6	4
(Ukraine) V Sachko	6	5	2
WC	(Italy) G Zeppieri	1	7	6
SE	(Brazil) O Luz	3	1
2	(Kazakhstan) D Popko	6	6

Second round
8	(Portugal) G Elias	6	6
Q	(Italy) F Forti	2	4
(Croatia) N Serdarušić	6	6
3	(Italy) P Lorenzi	3	1
5	(United Kingdom) J Clarke	6	6
(Ecuador) R Quiroz	4	4
WC	(Italy) G Zeppieri	5	6	2
2	(Kazakhstan) D Popko	7	2	6

Quarterfinals
8	(Portugal) G Elias	6	3	0
(Croatia) N Serdarušić	4	6	6
5	(United Kingdom) J Clarke	3	6	7
2	(Kazakhstan) D Popko	6	4	5

Semifinals
(Croatia) N Serdarušić	6	6
5	(United Kingdom) J Clarke	1	1
