= 2021 Internazionali di Tennis Città di Verona – Doubles =

Doubles
- 2021 Internazionali di Tennis Città di Verona

Final
- Champions: (France) Sadio Doumbia (France) Fabien Reboul
- Runners-up: (Switzerland) Luca Margaroli (Portugal) Gonçalo Oliveira
- Score: 7–5, 4–6, [10–6]

Events
| Singles | Doubles |
- Internazionali di Tennis Città di Verona

This was the first edition of the tournament.

Sadio Doumbia and Fabien Reboul won the title after defeating Luca Margaroli and Gonçalo Oliveira 7–5, 4–6, [10–6] in the final.

== Seeds ==
1. (United Kingdom) Lloyd Glasspool / (United Kingdom) Jonny O'Mara (first round)
2. (Venezuela) Luis David Martínez / (Italy) Andrea Vavassori (first round)
3. (France) Sadio Doumbia / (France) Fabien Reboul (champions)
4. (Switzerland) Luca Margaroli / (Portugal) Gonçalo Oliveira (final)

== Draw ==
Key

- Q = Qualifier
- WC = Wild card
- LL = Lucky loser
- Alt = Alternate
- ITF = ITF entry
- PR = Protected ranking
- SR = Special ranking
- SE = Special exempt
- JE = Junior exempt
- JR = Junior Accelerator Programme entrant
- CO = College Accelerator Programme entrant
- NG = Next Gen Accelerator Program entrant
- w/o = Walkover
- r = Retired
- d = Defaulted

First round
1 | (United Kingdom) L Glasspool (United Kingdom) J O'Mara | 2 | 2
PR | (Tunisia) M Jaziri (Italy) A Motti | 6 | 6
WC | (Italy) M Bortolotti (Colombia) C Rodríguez | 5 | 7 | [10]
(Italy) F Forti (Italy) G Zeppieri | 7 | 5 | [7]
4 | (Switzerland) L Margaroli (Portugal) G Oliveira | 4 | 7^{7} | [11]
(Spain) D Vega Hernández (Netherlands) M Vervoort | 6 | 6^{5} | [9]
(Netherlands) J de Jong (Netherlands) T van Rijthoven | 6 | 6
(Colombia) N Mejía (Ecuador) R Quiroz | 3 | 4
WC | (Italy) Nicolò Pozzani (Italy) Alessio Zanotti | 6^{1} | 1
WC | (Brazil) Gabriel Roveri Sidney (Brazil) M Zormann | 7^{7} | 6
(Russia) P Kotov (Chinese Taipei) C-h Tseng | 7 | 1 | [8]
3 | (France) S Doumbia (France) F Reboul | 5 | 6 | [10]
(Brazil) O Luz (Brazil) M Pucinelli de Almeida | 7^{7} | 6
(Colombia) N Barrientos (Italy) J Ocleppo | 6^{3} | 2
(United States) E King (United States) M Schnur | 3 | 6 | [11]
2 | (Venezuela) LD Martínez (Italy) A Vavassori | 6 | 3 | [9]

Quarterfinals
PR | (Tunisia) M Jaziri (Italy) A Motti | 1 | 7^{7} | [10]
WC | (Italy) M Bortolotti (Colombia) C Rodríguez | 6 | 6^{5} | [7]
4 | (Switzerland) L Margaroli (Portugal) G Oliveira | 6 | 7
(Netherlands) J de Jong (Netherlands) T van Rijthoven | 4 | 5
WC | (Brazil) G Roveri Sidney (Brazil) M Zormann | 3 | 2
3 | (France) S Doumbia (France) F Reboul | 6 | 6
(Brazil) O Luz (Brazil) M Pucinelli de Almeida | 4 | 3
(United States) E King (United States) M Schnur | 6 | 6

Semifinals
PR | (Tunisia) M Jaziri (Italy) A Motti | 5 | 1
4 | (Switzerland) L Margaroli (Portugal) G Oliveira | 7 | 6
3 | (France) S Doumbia (France) F Reboul | 6 | 7^{8}
(United States) E King (United States) M Schnur | 3 | 6^{6}

Final
4 | (Switzerland) L Margaroli (Portugal) G Oliveira | 5 | 6 | [6]
3 | (France) S Doumbia (France) F Reboul | 7 | 4 | [10]
