= 2025 Porto Open – Women's singles =

Women's singles
- 2025 Porto Open

Final
- Champion: (Czech Republic) Tereza Valentová
- Runner-up: (Thailand) Lanlana Tararudee
- Score: 6–4, 6–2

Events
Singles	men	women
Doubles	men	women
- Porto Open

Maja Chwalińska was the reigning champion, but she chose to compete in Iași instead.

Tereza Valentová won the title, defeating Lanlana Tararudee in the final, 6–4, 6–2.

== Seeds ==
1. (Japan) Aoi Ito (first round)
2. (Australia) Priscilla Hon (first round)
3. (Czech Republic) Tereza Valentová (champion)
4. (United Kingdom) Heather Watson (first round, retired)
5. (China) Gao Xinyu (quarterfinals)
6. (Switzerland) Céline Naef (first round)
7. (Belgium) Sofia Costoulas (first round, retired)
8. Alina Charaeva (second round)

== Draw ==
Key

- Q = Qualifier
- WC = Wild card
- LL = Lucky loser
- Alt = Alternate
- ITF = ITF entry
- PR = Protected ranking
- SR = Special ranking
- SE = Special exempt
- JE = Junior exempt
- JR = Junior Accelerator Programme entrant
- CO = College Accelerator Programme entrant
- NG = Next Gen Accelerator Program entrant
- w/o = Walkover
- r = Retired
- d = Defaulted

=== Finals ===
Semifinals
Q	(Japan) Himeno Sakatsume	6^{0}	1
3	(Czech Republic) Tereza Valentová	7^{7}	6
(Thailand) Lanlana Tararudee	6	6
(Germany) Anna-Lena Friedsam	3	3

Final
3	(Czech Republic) Tereza Valentová	6	6
(Thailand) Lanlana Tararudee	4	2

=== Top half ===
First round
1	(Japan) A Ito	1	1
Q	(Japan) H Sakatsume	6	6
Q	A Korneeva	6	6
(France) M Léonard	4	2
V Diatchenko	6	6
(Czech Republic) G Knutson	2	4
WC	(Portugal) L Couto	1	1
8	A Charaeva	6	6
3	(Czech Republic) T Valentová	6	6
(Portugal) F Jorge	1	3
Q	(United States) E Bektas	4	7^{7}	6^{6}
(Slovakia) V Hrunčáková	6	6^{4}	7^{8}
(Portugal) M Jorge	6	6
(France) C Monnet	3	4
(France) T Andrianjafitrimo	1	2
5	(China) X Gao	6	6

Second round
Q	(Japan) H Sakatsume	7	7^{7}
Q	A Korneeva	5	6^{3}
V Diatchenko	6	4	7^{7}
8	A Charaeva	4	6	6^{0}
3	(Czech Republic) T Valentová	6	6
(Slovakia) V Hrunčáková	3	0
(Portugal) M Jorge	1	6	3
5	(China) X Gao	6	0	6

Quarterfinals
Q	(Japan) H Sakatsume	2	7	6
V Diatchenko	6	5	4
3	(Czech Republic) T Valentová	6	6
5	(China) X Gao	0	3

Semifinals
Q	(Japan) H Sakatsume	6^{0}	1
3	(Czech Republic) T Valentová	7^{7}	6

=== Bottom half ===
First round
7	(Belgium) S Costoulas	5	1^{r}
(Australia) T Preston	7	2
(Thailand) L Tararudee	6	6
(Switzerland) V Ryser	2	2
Q	A Falei	6^{4}	6	2
(United States) H Inoue	7^{7}	3	6
WC	(Portugal) A Voloshchuk	6	0
4	(United Kingdom) H Watson	4	0^{r}
6	(Switzerland) C Naef	4	1
(Germany) A-L Friedsam	6	6
(Australia) L Cabrera	6	6
WC	(Portugal) A Freitas	2	1
WC	(Portugal) F Laundes	0	1
(Germany) M Barthel	6	6
(Japan) M Hontama	6	7^{7}
2	(Australia) P Hon	1	6^{4}

Second round
(Australia) T Preston	2	2
(Thailand) L Tararudee	6	6
(United States) H Inoue	4	3
WC	(Portugal) A Voloshchuk	6	6
(Germany) A-L Friedsam	7	7^{13}
(Australia) L Cabrera	5	6^{11}
(Germany) M Barthel	0^{r}
(Japan) M Hontama	3

Quarterfinals
(Thailand) L Tararudee	7	6
WC	(Portugal) A Voloshchuk	5	2
(Germany) A-L Friedsam	3	6	6
(Japan) M Hontama	6	4	4

Semifinals
(Thailand) L Tararudee	6	6
(Germany) A-L Friedsam	3	3

== Qualifying ==
=== Seeds ===
1. (Kazakhstan) Zarina Diyas (qualifying competition)
2. (Japan) Himeno Sakatsume (qualified)
3. (Japan) Mei Yamaguchi (qualifying competition)
4. Alina Korneeva (qualified)
5. (Chinese Taipei) Liang En-shuo (qualifying competition)
6. (United States) Emina Bektas (qualified)
7. Aliona Falei (qualified)
8. (France) Yasmine Mansouri (first round)

=== Qualifiers ===
1. Aliona Falei
2. (Japan) Himeno Sakatsume
3. (United States) Emina Bektas
4. Alina Korneeva

=== Qualifying draw ===
==== First qualifier ====
First round
1	(Kazakhstan) Zarina Diyas	6	6
WC	(Portugal) Ana Filipa Santos	3	0
Evialina Laskevich	4	6^{4}
7	Aliona Falei	6	7^{7}

Qualifying competition
1	(Kazakhstan) Zarina Diyas	2	6	4
7	Aliona Falei	6	4	6

==== Second qualifier ====
First round
2	(Japan) Himeno Sakatsume	6	6
WC	(Portugal) Teresa Franco Dias	0	1
(India) Ankita Raina	3	1
5	(Chinese Taipei) Liang En-shuo	6	6

Qualifying competition
2	(Japan) Himeno Sakatsume	6	6
5	(Chinese Taipei) Liang En-shuo	3	4

==== Third qualifier ====
First round
3	(Japan) Mei Yamaguchi	7	7
Anastasia Tikhonova	5	5
(Japan) Rinko Matsuda	2	5
6	(United States) Emina Bektas	6	7

Qualifying competition
3	(Japan) Mei Yamaguchi	0	4
6	(United States) Emina Bektas	6	6

==== Fourth qualifier ====
First round
4	Alina Korneeva	6	6
Ekaterina Ovcharenko	2	3
(United States) Madison Sieg	6	2	6
8	(France) Yasmine Mansouri	2	6	4

Qualifying competition
4	Alina Korneeva	6	6
(United States) Madison Sieg	2	3
