= 2025 Porto Open – Men's singles =

Men's singles
- 2025 Porto Open

Final
- Champion: (Tunisia) Moez Echargui
- Runner-up: (Italy) Francesco Maestrelli
- Score: 6–3, 6–2

Events
Singles	men	women
Doubles	men	women
- Porto Open

August Holmgren was the defending champion but chose not to defend his title.

Moez Echargui won the title after defeating Francesco Maestrelli 6–3, 6–2 in the final.

== Seeds ==
1. (Portugal) Jaime Faria (first round)
2. (Spain) Martín Landaluce (second round)
3. (Switzerland) Marc-Andrea Hüsler (first round)
4. (Spain) Daniel Mérida (first round)
5. (Portugal) Henrique Rocha (quarterfinals)
6. (Italy) Francesco Maestrelli (final)
7. (France) Hugo Grenier (semifinals)
8. (France) Luca Van Assche (second round)

== Draw ==
Key

- Q = Qualifier
- WC = Wild card
- LL = Lucky loser
- Alt = Alternate
- ITF = ITF entry
- PR = Protected ranking
- SR = Special ranking
- SE = Special exempt
- JE = Junior exempt
- JR = Junior Accelerator Programme entrant
- CO = College Accelerator Programme entrant
- NG = Next Gen Accelerator Program entrant
- w/o = Walkover
- r = Retired
- d = Defaulted

=== Finals ===
Semifinals
7	(France) Hugo Grenier	6^{6}	4
Q	(Tunisia) Moez Echargui	7^{8}	6
6	(Italy) Francesco Maestrelli	6	6
(Spain) Alejandro Moro Cañas	4	4

Final
Q	(Tunisia) Moez Echargui	6	6
6	(Italy) Francesco Maestrelli	3	2

=== Top half ===
First round
1	(Portugal) J Faria	6	6^{3}	5
(Sweden) E Ymer	2	7^{7}	7
A Karatsev	6^{7}	4
(Kazakhstan) M Kukushkin	7^{9}	6
SE	(Spain) N Álvarez Varona	6^{1}	6	0^{r}
(Chile) M Soto	7^{7}	4	2
WC	(Portugal) Pedro Araújo	0	6^{4}
7	(France) H Grenier	6	7^{7}
3	(Switzerland) M-A Hüsler	5	6	3
(Portugal) F Ferreira Silva	7	4	6
(Uzbekistan) K Sultanov	7^{7}	4	4
Q	(Tunisia) M Echargui	6^{3}	6	6
(Lithuania) E Butvilas	6	7^{8}
(Kazakhstan) D Yevseyev	2	6^{6}
Q	(Colombia) A Soriano Barrera	2	3
8	(France) L Van Assche	6	6

Second round
(Sweden) E Ymer	6	3	6
(Kazakhstan) M Kukushkin	3	6	4
(Chile) M Soto	3	3
7	(France) H Grenier	6	6
(Portugal) F Ferreira Silva	3	3
Q	(Tunisia) M Echargui	6	6
(Lithuania) E Butvilas	6	6
8	(France) L Van Assche	2	4

Quarterfinals
(Sweden) E Ymer	6	1	4
7	(France) H Grenier	3	6	6
Q	(Tunisia) M Echargui	4	6	6
(Lithuania) E Butvilas	6	3	3

Semifinals
7	(France) H Grenier	6^{6}	4
Q	(Tunisia) M Echargui	7^{8}	6

=== Bottom half ===
First round
6	(Italy) F Maestrelli	4	7^{7}	6
Q	(Portugal) T Torres	6	6^{2}	3
(United Kingdom) G Loffhagen	6^{2}	6	6
Q	(Italy) G Zeppieri	7^{7}	3	0
Q	(United States) Maxwell McKennon	2	2
WC	(Portugal) T Pereira	6	6
(France) A Escoffier	6	6
4	(Spain) D Mérida	2	2
5	(Portugal) H Rocha	6	6
Q	(United Kingdom) H Searle	4	4
Alt	(Moldova) R Albot	0	3
(Ivory Coast) E Coulibaly	6	6
(China) J Cui	4	6^{3}
(Spain) A Moro Cañas	6	7^{7}
WC	(Portugal) G Elias	5	3
2	(Spain) M Landaluce	7	6

Second round
6	(Italy) F Maestrelli	6	6
(United Kingdom) G Loffhagen	3	2
WC	(Portugal) T Pereira	6	4	5
(France) A Escoffier	3	6	7
5	(Portugal) H Rocha	7^{8}	6
(Ivory Coast) E Coulibaly	6^{6}	4
(Spain) A Moro Cañas	4	7^{7}	6
2	(Spain) M Landaluce	6	6^{4}	3

Quarterfinals
6	(Italy) F Maestrelli	6	6
(France) A Escoffier	2	4
5	(Portugal) H Rocha	3	2
(Spain) A Moro Cañas	6	6

Semifinals
6	(Italy) F Maestrelli	6	6
(Spain) A Moro Cañas	4	4
