= 2025 Porto Open – Women's doubles =

Women's doubles
- 2025 Porto Open

Final
- Champions: (United States) Carmen Corley (United States) Ivana Corley
- Runners-up: (Chinese Taipei) Liang En-shuo (Thailand) Peangtarn Plipuech
- Score: 6-3, 6-1

Events
| Singles | men | women |
| Doubles | men | women |
- Porto Open

Carmen and Ivana Corley won the tournament, defeating Liang En-shuo and Peangtarn Plipuech in the final, 6-3, 6-1.

Arianne Hartono and Prarthana Thombare were the reigning champions, but chose not to participate this year.

== Seeds ==
1. (Portugal) Francisca Jorge / (Portugal) Matilde Jorge (quarterfinals)
2. (United Kingdom) Madeleine Brooks / (Hong Kong) Eudice Chong (quarterfinals)
3. (France) Estelle Cascino / (France) Carole Monnet (semifinals)
4. (Switzerland) Céline Naef / (United Kingdom) Heather Watson (withdrew)

== Draw ==
Key

- Q = Qualifier
- WC = Wild card
- LL = Lucky loser
- Alt = Alternate
- ITF = ITF entry
- PR = Protected ranking
- SR = Special ranking
- SE = Special exempt
- JE = Junior exempt
- JR = Junior Accelerator Programme entrant
- CO = College Accelerator Programme entrant
- NG = Next Gen Accelerator Program entrant
- w/o = Walkover
- r = Retired
- d = Defaulted

=== Draw ===
First round
1 | (Portugal) F Jorge (Portugal) M Jorge | 6 | 7
(India) A Raina (Thailand) L Tararudee | 2 | 5
A Charaeva (Czech Republic) G Knutson | 6 | 6
Alt | (Portugal) T Franco Dias (Japan) R Matsuda | 0 | 4
(Japan) M Ayukawa (Romania) B Szabó | 4 | 6 | [10]
WC | (Portugal) AF Santos (Portugal) A Voloshchuk | 6 | 4 | [0]
(Australia) L Cabrera (Australia) T Preston | 3 | 4
(India) R Bhatia (Croatia) M Dražić | 6 | 6
(United Kingdom) F Christie (Bosnia and Herzegovina) A Wagner | 4 | 4
3 | (France) E Cascino (France) C Monnet | 6 | 6
(Chinese Taipei) E-s Liang (Thailand) P Plipuech | 6 | 6
E Ovcharenko (United Kingdom) E Webley-Smith | 1 | 4
V Diatchenko (Slovakia) V Hrunčáková | 5 | 4
2 | (United Kingdom) M Brooks (Hong Kong) E Chong | 7 | 6

Quarterfinals
1 | (Portugal) F Jorge (Portugal) M Jorge | 6^{4} | 2
A Charaeva (Czech Republic) G Knutson | 7^{7} | 6
(United States) C Corley (United States) I Corley | 6 | 6
(Japan) M Ayukawa (Romania) B Szabó | 3 | 3
(India) R Bhatia (Croatia) M Dražić | 2 | 1
3 | (France) E Cascino (France) C Monnet | 6 | 6
(Chinese Taipei) E-s Liang (Thailand) P Plipuech | 6 | 6
2 | (United Kingdom) M Brooks (Hong Kong) E Chong | 4 | 4

Semifinals
A Charaeva (Czech Republic) G Knutson | 5 | 3
(United States) C Corley (United States) I Corley | 7 | 6
3 | (France) E Cascino (France) C Monnet | 6 | 4 | [6]
(Chinese Taipei) E-s Liang (Thailand) P Plipuech | 2 | 6 | [10]

Final
(United States) C Corley (United States) I Corley | 6 | 6
(Chinese Taipei) E-s Liang (Thailand) P Plipuech | 3 | 1
