= 2025 Porto Open – Men's doubles =

Men's doubles
- 2025 Porto Open

Final
- Champions: (United States) George Goldhoff (Chinese Taipei) Ray Ho
- Runners-up: (Colombia) Nicolás Barrientos (Belgium) Joran Vliegen
- Score: 6–4, 6–4

Events
Singles	men	women
Doubles	men	women
← 2024 ·	Porto Open	· 2026 →

Sander Arends and Luke Johnson were the defending champions but chose not to defend their title.

George Goldhoff and Ray Ho won the title after defeating Nicolás Barrientos and Joran Vliegen 6–4, 6–4 in the final.

== Seeds ==
1. (France) Théo Arribagé / (Brazil) Orlando Luz (first round)
2. (Netherlands) David Pel / (Netherlands) Jean-Julien Rojer (semifinals)
3. (Colombia) Nicolás Barrientos / (Belgium) Joran Vliegen (final)
4. (Poland) Piotr Matuszewski / (Australia) Matthew Romios (first round)

== Draw ==
Key

- Q = Qualifier
- WC = Wild card
- LL = Lucky loser
- Alt = Alternate
- ITF = ITF entry
- PR = Protected ranking
- SR = Special ranking
- SE = Special exempt
- JE = Junior exempt
- JR = Junior Accelerator Programme entrant
- CO = College Accelerator Programme entrant
- NG = Next Gen Accelerator Program entrant
- w/o = Walkover
- r = Retired
- d = Defaulted

=== Draw ===
First round
1	(France) T Arribagé (Brazil) O Luz	4	4
(United Kingdom) J Paris (United Kingdom) M Willis	6	6
(Spain) Í Cervantes (Israel) D Cukierman	6	3	[7]
(Romania) A Jecan (Romania) B Pavel	3	6	[10]
4	(Poland) P Matuszewski (Australia) MC Romios	5	7^{7}	[5]
(Denmark) J Ingildsen (Portugal) T Pereira	7	6^{1}	[10]
(United Kingdom) D Stevenson (Czech Republic) M Vocel	7^{10}	6^{3}	[6]
(United States) G Goldhoff (Chinese Taipei) R Ho	6^{8}	7^{7}	[10]
(Bolivia) B Arias (Chile) M Soto	2	6	[6]
(South Korea) J-s Nam (Japan) T Yuzuki	6	3	[10]
(India) S Balaji (India) VS Prashanth	6^{3}	3
3	(Colombia) N Barrientos (Belgium) J Vliegen	7^{7}	6
WC	(Portugal) Pedro Araújo (Portugal) Diogo Marques	7	7
(Ivory Coast) E Coulibaly (France) H Grenier	5	5
WC	(Portugal) Vasco Leote Prata (Portugal) Tiago Silva	2	4
2	(Netherlands) D Pel (Netherlands) J-J Rojer	6	6

Quarterfinals
(United Kingdom) J Paris (United Kingdom) M Willis	6	6
(Romania) A Jecan (Romania) B Pavel	2	4
(Denmark) J Ingildsen (Portugal) T Pereira	6	3	[5]
(United States) G Goldhoff (Chinese Taipei) R Ho	4	6	[10]
(South Korea) J-s Nam (Japan) T Yuzuki	6	1	[6]
3	(Colombia) N Barrientos (Belgium) J Vliegen	4	6	[10]
WC	(Portugal) P Araújo (Portugal) D Marques	6^{3}	3
2	(Netherlands) D Pel (Netherlands) J-J Rojer	7^{7}	6

Semifinals
(United Kingdom) J Paris (United Kingdom) M Willis	6	4	[13]
(United States) G Goldhoff (Chinese Taipei) R Ho	4	6	[15]
3	(Colombia) N Barrientos (Belgium) J Vliegen	7	6^{5}	[10]
2	(Netherlands) D Pel (Netherlands) J-J Rojer	5	7^{7}	[4]

Final
(United States) G Goldhoff (Chinese Taipei) R Ho	6	6
3	(Colombia) N Barrientos (Belgium) J Vliegen	4	4
