= 2025 Porto Open =

Tennis tournament

- Date: 14–20 July 2025 (WTA 125); 21–27 July 2025 (ITF men); 28 July–3 August (ATP 100 men)
- Edition: 22nd (women); 19th (men)
- Category: WTA 125 tournaments ITF Men's Circuit; Challenger 100
- Surface: Hard / Outdoor
- Location: Porto, Portugal

Champions

Men's singles
- (Tunisia) Moez Echargui

Women's singles
- (Czech Republic) Tereza Valentová

Men's doubles
- (United States) George Goldhoff / (Chinese Taipei) Ray Ho

Women's doubles
- (United States) Carmen Corley / (United States) Ivana Corley
- Porto Open

The 2025 Porto Open, known as the Eupago Porto Open (for sponsorship reasons), was a professional tennis tournament played on outdoor hardcourts. It was the nineteenth edition of the men's event and the twenty-second edition of the women's event. The tournament was part of the 2025 WTA 125 tournaments, the 2025 ATP Challenger Tour and the ITF Men's Circuit. It took place in Porto, Portugal, between 14 and 20 July 2025 for the women and between 21 July and 3 August 2025 for the men.

== ATP singles main-draw entrants ==
=== Seeds ===
Country	Player	Rank^{1}	Seed
POR	Jaime Faria	119	1
ESP	Martín Landaluce	134	2
SUI	Marc-Andrea Hüsler	170	3
ESP	Daniel Mérida	175	4
POR	Henrique Rocha	177	5
ITA	Francesco Maestrelli	179	6
FRA	Hugo Grenier	190	7
FRA	Luca Van Assche	192	8

- ^{1} Rankings are as of 21 July 2025.

=== Other entrants ===
The following players received wildcards into the singles main draw:

- (Portugal) Pedro Araújo
- (Portugal) Gastão Elias
- (Portugal) Tiago Pereira

The following player received entry into the singles main draw as a special exempt:

- (Spain) Nicolás Álvarez Varona

The following player received entry into the singles main draw as an alternate:

- (Moldova) Radu Albot

The following players received entry from the qualifying draw:

- (Tunisia) Moez Echargui
- (United States) Maxwell McKennon
- (United Kingdom) Henry Searle
- (Colombia) Adrià Soriano Barrera
- (Portugal) Tiago Torres
- (Italy) Giulio Zeppieri

== WTA singles main-draw entrants ==
=== Seeds ===
Country	Player	Rank	Seed
JPN	Aoi Ito	108	1
AUS	Priscilla Hon	134	2
CZE	Tereza Valentová	135	3
GBR	Heather Watson	143	4
CHN	Gao Xinyu	147	5
SUI	Céline Naef	178	6
BEL	Sofia Costoulas	181	7
	Alina Charaeva	182	8

- Rankings are as of 30 June 2025.

=== Other entrants ===
The following players received wildcards into the singles main draw:

- (Portugal) Lena Couto
- (Portugal) Analu Freitas
- (Portugal) Francisca Laundes
- (Portugal) Angelina Voloshchuk

The following players received entry from the qualifying draw:

- (United States) Emina Bektas
- Aliona Falei
- Alina Korneeva
- (Japan) Himeno Sakatsume

=== Withdrawals ===
Before the tournament

- (United Kingdom) Harriet Dart → replaced by (Australia) Lizette Cabrera
- Kristina Dmitruk → replaced by (Switzerland) Valentina Ryser
- (France) Fiona Ferro → replaced by (Czech Republic) Gabriela Knutson
- (Australia) Storm Hunter → replaced by (United States) Hina Inoue
- (Japan) Kyōka Okamura → replaced by (Slovakia) Viktória Hrunčáková
- (Serbia) Nina Stojanović → replaced by (France) Manon Léonard

== WTA doubles main-draw entrants ==
=== Seeds ===
Country	Player	Country	Player	Rank^{1}	Seed
POR	Francisca Jorge	POR	Matilde Jorge	205	1
GBR	Madeleine Brooks	HKG	Eudice Chong	289	2
FRA	Estelle Cascino	FRA	Carole Monnet	299	3
SUI	Céline Naef	GBR	Heather Watson	336	4

- ^{1} Rankings are as of 30 June 2025.

=== Other entrants ===
The following pair received a wildcard into the doubles main draw:

- (Portugal) Ana Filipa Santos / (Portugal) Angelina Voloshchuk

== Champions ==
=== Men's singles ===
- (Tunisia) Moez Echargui def. (Italy) Francesco Maestrelli 6–3, 6–2.

=== Women's singles ===
- (Czech Republic) Tereza Valentová def. (Thailand) Lanlana Tararudee 6–4, 6–2

=== Men's doubles ===
- (United States) George Goldhoff / (Chinese Taipei) Ray Ho def. (Colombia) Nicolás Barrientos / (Belgium) Joran Vliegen 6–4, 6–4.

=== Women's doubles ===
- (United States) Carmen Corley / (United States) Ivana Corley def. (Chinese Taipei) Liang En-shuo / (Thailand) Peangtarn Plipuech 6–3, 6–1
