= Tomás Lipovšek Puches =

Slovenian–Argentine tennis player

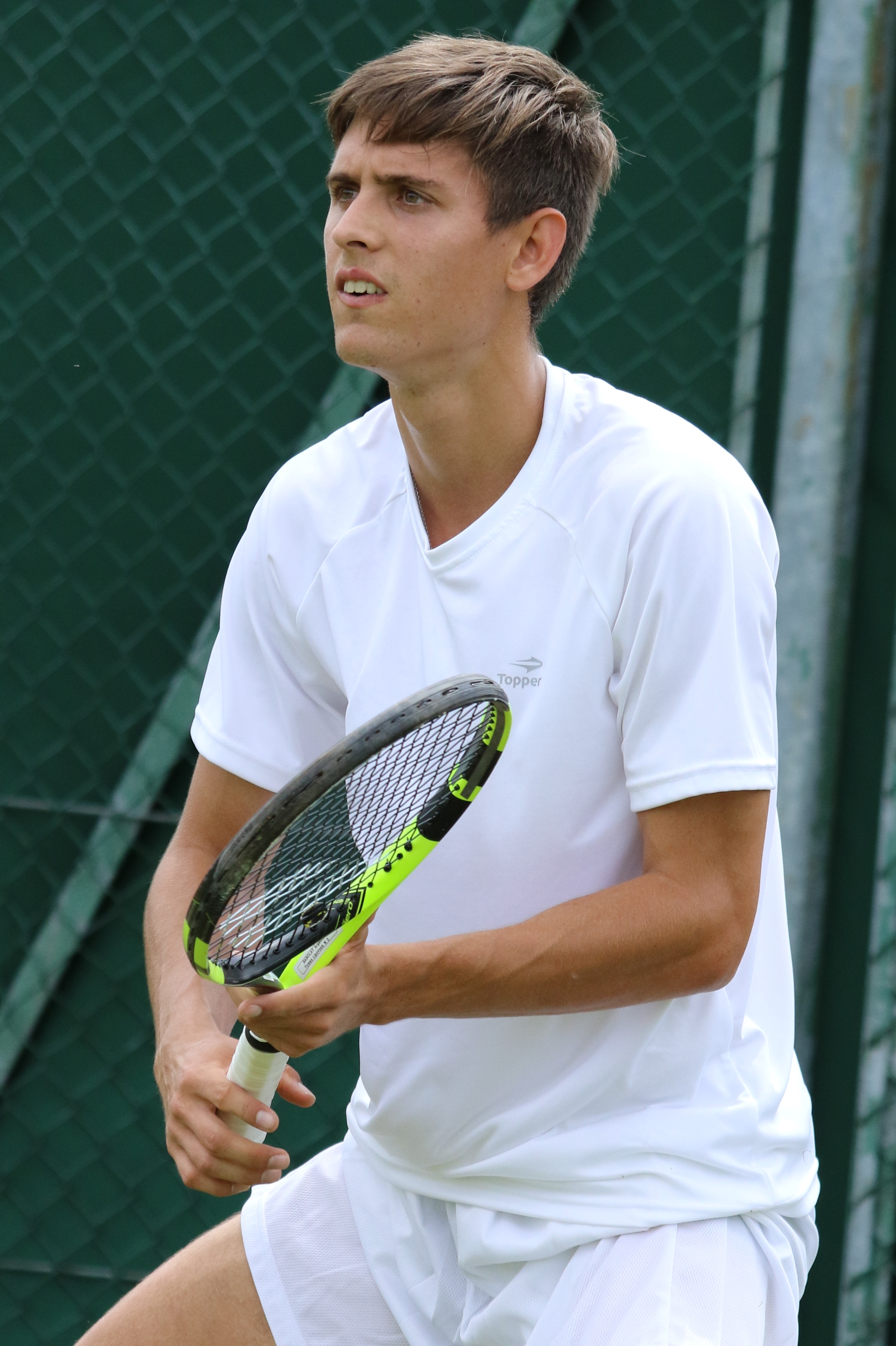
- Country (sports): Slovenia (2019–2022); Argentina (2011–2019, 2022–present)
- Born: 17 April 1993 (age 33) Buenos Aires, Argentina
- Height: 183 cm (6 ft 0 in)
- Plays: Right-handed (two handed-backhand)
- Prize money: $178,758

Singles
- Career record: 0–0 (at ATP Tour level, Grand Slam level, and in Davis Cup)
- Career titles: 0; 0 Challenger, 7 Futures
- Highest ranking: No. 250 (25 April 2016)

Grand Slam singles results
- Wimbledon: Q1 (2016)

Doubles
- Career record: 0–1 (at ATP Tour level, Grand Slam level, and in Davis Cup)
- Career titles: 0; 1 Challenger, 29 Futures
- Highest ranking: No. 200 (5 March 2018)

Tomás Lipovšek Puches (born 17 April 1993) is a Slovenian–Argentine tennis player.

Lipovšek Puches has a career high ATP singles ranking of No. 250 achieved on 25 April 2016 and a career high ATP doubles ranking of No. 200 achieved on 5 March 2018. In February 2016, Lipovsek Puches made his ATP main draw debut at the 2016 Argentina Open, where he received a wildcard into the doubles draw partnering Manuel Peña López. They lost in the first round to Guido Pella and Diego Schwartzman. His professional debut had also been against his compatriot Diego Schwartzman, in April 2011, losing 3-6 0–6 at a Futures event in his native Argentina.

In May 2019, Lipovšek Puches switched nationalities to represent Slovenia. He returned to play for Argentina in 2022.

== ATP Challenger and ITF Futures finals ==
=== Singles: 15 (7–8) ===
Legend ATP Challengers (0–0) ITF Futures/World Tennis Tour (7–8)	Titles by surface Hard (0–0) Clay (7–8) Grass (0–0)

Result	W–L	Date	Tournament	Tier	Surface	Opponent	Score
Win	1–0	Aug 2013	Argentina F14, San Francisco	Futures	Clay	(Argentina) Facundo Mena	6–3, 6–2
Win	2–0	Sep 2013	Argentina F18, Neuquén	Futures	Clay	(Uruguay) Martín Cuevas	7–5, 6–7^{(3–7)}, 6–0
Win	3–0	Nov 2013	Chile F7, Concepción	Futures	Clay	(Argentina) Eduardo Agustín Torre	6–2, 6–3
Loss	3–1	Jun 2014	Croatia F13, Bol	Futures	Clay	(France) Mathias Bourgue	2–6, 6–7^{(2–7)}
Loss	3–2	Jun 2014	Argentina F7, Villa María	Futures	Clay	(Argentina) Nicolás Kicker	4–6, 3–6
Win	4–2	Jun 2014	Argentina F8, Villa del Dique	Futures	Clay	(Argentina) Patricio Heras	6–4, 2–6, 7–6^{(9–7)}
Loss	4–3	Dec 2014	Chile F11, Villa Alemana	Futures	Clay	(Chile) Bastián Malla	6–4, 1–6, 2–6
Loss	4–4	May 2015	Argentina F7, Villa Allende	Futures	Clay	(Argentina) Nicolás Kicker	1–6, 2–6
Win	5–4	Sep 2015	Croatia F17, Bol	Futures	Clay	(Serbia) Miki Janković	6–3, ret.
Loss	5–5	Dec 2015	Chile F9, Osorno	Futures	Clay	(Chile) Gonzalo Lama	5–7, 3–6
Win	6–5	Mar 2016	Argentina F3, Rosario	Futures	Clay	(Brazil) Pedro Sakamoto	6–4, 2–6, 6–1
Loss	6–6	Mar 2016	Argentina F4, Olavarría	Futures	Clay	(Argentina) Maximiliano Estévez	2–6, 6–7^{(4–7)}
Loss	6–7	Nov 2016	Argentina F13, Villa del Dique	Futures	Clay	(Argentina) Federico Coria	6–3, 1–6, 4–6
Win	7–7	Jun 2017	Argentina F1, Villa del Dique	Futures	Clay	(Brazil) Oscar José Gutierrez	6–2, 7–6^{(7–2)}
Loss	7–8	Nov 2017	Argentina F10, Villa del Dique	Futures	Clay	(Argentina) Juan Ignacio Galarza	4–6, 4–6

=== Doubles: 51 (31–20) ===
Legend ATP Challengers (1–1) ITF Futures/World Tennis Tour (30–19)	Titles by surface Hard (1–2) Clay (30–18) Grass (0–0)

Result	W–L	Date	Tournament	Tier	Surface	Partner	Opponents	Score
Win	1–0	Mar 2012	Argentina F2, Dolores	Futures	Clay	(Argentina) Juan Pablo Ortiz	(United States) Andrea Collarini (Argentina) Nicolas Pastor	1–6, 6–4, [10–8]
Loss	1–1	Apr 2012	Argentina F5, Villa del Dique	Futures	Clay	(Argentina) Juan Pablo Ortiz	(Argentina) Valentín Flórez (Argentina) Kevin Konfederak	4–6, 4–6
Loss	1–2	Apr 2012	Argentina F6, Villa María	Futures	Clay	(Argentina) Juan Pablo Ortiz	(Peru) Sergio Galdós (Argentina) Renzo Olivo	6–1, 4–6, [4–10]
Loss	1–3	Sep 2012	Argentina F24, San Juan	Futures	Clay	(Argentina) Juan Pablo Ortiz	(Argentina) Juan Ignacio Londero (Argentina) Mateo Nicolás Martínez	2–6, 6–7^{(6–8)}
Win	2–3	Aug 2013	Argentina F14, San Francisco	Futures	Clay	(Argentina) Juan Ignacio Galarza	(Argentina) Gabriel Alejandro Hidalgo (Argentina) Mauricio Pérez Mota	4–6, 6–3, [10–8]
Win	3–3	Dec 2013	Chile F11, Quillota	Futures	Clay	(Argentina) Eduardo Agustín Torre	(Brazil) Augusto Laranja (Argentina) Santiago Maccio	7–5, 6–3
Win	4–3	Feb 2014	Argentina F1, Carlos Paz	Futures	Clay	(Argentina) Eduardo Agustín Torre	(Chile) Simón Navarro (Chile) Cristóbal Saavedra Corvalán	6–4, 6–4
Loss	4–4	Jun 2014	Croatia F11, Bol	Futures	Clay	(Japan) Ryusei Makiguchi	(Russia) Evgeny Karlovskiy (Croatia) Lovro Zovko	3–6, 3–6
Loss	4–5	Jun 2014	Croatia F12, Bol	Futures	Clay	(Japan) Ryusei Makiguchi	(Argentina) Gaston-Arturo Grimolizzi (Italy) Giorgio Portaluri	6–3, 5–7, [4–10]
Win	5–5	Aug 2014	Argentina F12, Corrientes	Futures	Clay	(Japan) Ryusei Makiguchi	(Argentina) Federico Coria (Argentina) Juan Ignacio Galarza	4–6, 6–3, [10–5]
Loss	5–6	Dec 2014	Chile F11, Villa Alemana	Futures	Clay	(Argentina) Nicolás Alberto Arreche	(Chile) Julio Peralta (Chile) Ricardo Urzúa Rivera	5–7, 0–6
Win	6–6	Mar 2015	Argentina F2, Mendoza	Futures	Clay	(Argentina) Juan Ignacio Galarza	(Italy) Francisco Bahamonde (Argentina) Federico Coria	4–6, 6–2, [10–8]
Loss	6–7	Jul 2015	Italy F16, Busto Arsizio	Futures	Clay	(Argentina) Mateo Nicolás Martínez	(Italy) Francesco Borgo (Italy) Matteo Volante	2–6, 1–6
Win	7–7	Jul 2015	Italy F18, Modena	Futures	Clay	(Argentina) Andrea Collarini	(Italy) Alessandro Luisi (Italy) Andrea Vavassori	7–5, 5–7, [10–7]
Win	8–7	Dec 2015	Chile F10, Puerto Montt	Futures	Hard	(Italy) Franco Agamenone	(Chile) Tomás Barrios Vera (Chile) Jorge Montero	6–3, 3–6, [10–3]
Win	9–7	Oct 2016	Campinas, Brazil	Challenger	Clay	(Argentina) Federico Coria	(Argentina) Máximo González (Peru) Sergio Galdós	7–5, 6–2
Win	10–7	Nov 2016	Argentina F13, Villa del Dique	Futures	Clay	(Argentina) Federico Coria	(Chile) Cristóbal Saavedra Corvalán (Chile) Ricardo Urzúa Rivera	7–6^{(10–8)}, 6–0
Win	11–7	Jun 2017	Argentina F1, Villa del Dique	Futures	Clay	(Argentina) Facundo Argüello	(Argentina) Hernán Casanova (Argentina) Juan Ignacio Galarza	6–0, 6–1
Win	12–7	Jun 2017	Argentina F2, Cordoba	Futures	Clay	(Argentina) Facundo Argüello	(Brazil) André Miele (Brazil) Nicolas Santos	6–2, 6–2
Win	13–7	Jun 2017	Argentina F3, Villa María	Futures	Clay	(Argentina) Facundo Argüello	(Brazil) Igor Marcondes (Brazil) Rafael Matos	1–6, 6–1, [10–8]
Win	14–7	Aug 2017	Argentina F4, Rosario	Futures	Clay	(Argentina) Gonzalo Villanueva	(Argentina) Maximiliano Estévez (Argentina) Valentín Flórez	6–3, 6–7^{(5–7)}, [10–6]
Win	15–7	Sep 2017	Argentina F5, Neuquén	Futures	Clay	(Argentina) Mariano Kestelboim	(Brazil) Daniel Dutra da Silva (Brazil) André Miele	1–6, 6–1, [11–9]
Win	16–7	Sep 2017	Argentina F7, Buenos Aires	Futures	Clay	(Argentina) Juan Ignacio Galarza	(Argentina) Gabriel Alejandro Hidalgo (Argentina) Federico Moreno	6–4, 6–4
Win	17–7	Nov 2017	Argentina F8, Corrientes	Futures	Clay	(Argentina) Juan Pablo Paz	(Argentina) Valentín Flórez (Argentina) Eduardo Agustín Torre	7–5, 2–6, [10–8]
Win	18–7	Nov 2017	Argentina F9, Santa Fe	Futures	Clay	(Argentina) Hernán Casanova	(Argentina) Geronimo Espin Busleiman (Argentina) Facundo Juárez	7–6^{(7–3)}, 1–6, [10–8]
Loss	18–8	Nov 2017	Argentina F10, Villa del Dique	Futures	Clay	(Argentina) Juan Ignacio Galarza	(Argentina) Franco Emanuel Egea (Venezuela) David Souto	2–6, 3–6
Win	19–8	Mar 2018	Croatia F3, Opatija	Futures	Clay	(Brazil) Bruno Sant'Anna	(Montenegro) Ljubomir Čelebić (Hungary) Péter Nagy	6–4, 6–1
Win	20–8	Apr 2018	Tunisia F12, Hammamet	Futures	Clay	(Argentina) Hernán Casanova	(Argentina) Mariano Kestelboim (Chile) Juan Carlos Sáez	1–6, 6–4, [10–2]
Loss	20–9	May 2018	Turkey F19, Antalya	Futures	Clay	(Italy) Antonio Massara	(Russia) Alexander Boborykin (Russia) Ivan Davydov	4–6, 2–6
Win	21–9	Jul 2018	Morocco F1, Khemisset	Futures	Clay	(Argentina) Juan Pablo Paz	(Spain) Fernando Bogajo (Peru) Mauricio Echazú	6–2, 7–5
Win	22–9	Aug 2018	Morocco F3, Tangier	Futures	Clay	(Argentina) Manuel Barros	(Morocco) Adam Moundir (Morocco) Lamine Ouahab	6–3, 6–1
Loss	22–10	Aug 2018	Switzerland F3, Sion	Futures	Clay	(Argentina) Juan Pablo Ficovich	(Switzerland) Marc-Andrea Hüsler (Switzerland) Jakub Paul	3–6, 4–6
Win	23–10	Feb 2019	M15 Antalya, Turkey	World Tennis Tour	Clay	(Argentina) Hernán Casanova	(Romania) Bogdan Borza (Romania) Edris Fetisleam	6–4, 7–5
Loss	23–11	Feb 2019	M15 Antalya, Turkey	World Tennis Tour	Clay	(Argentina) Hernán Casanova	(Italy) Riccardo Bellotti (Kazakhstan) Dmitry Popko	4–6, 6–7^{(3–7)}
Win	24–11	Apr 2019	M15 Pinamar, Argentina	World Tennis Tour	Clay	(Argentina) Matias Zukas	(Argentina) Genaro Alberto Olivieri (Argentina) Camilo Ugo Carabelli	6–1, 4–6, [10–2]
Loss	24–12	Apr 2019	M15 Madrid, Spain	World Tennis Tour	Clay	(Brazil) Felipe Meligeni Alves	(France) Corentin Denolly (Switzerland) Johan Nikles	5–7, 7–5, [11–13]
Win	25–12	May 2019	M15 Bucharest, Romania	World Tennis Tour	Clay	(Russia) Alexander Igoshin	(Italy) Giovanni Fonio (Italy) Nicolo Turchetti	2–6, 6–4, [10–8]
Win	26–12	Sep 2019	M15 Tabarka, Tunisia	World Tennis Tour	Clay	(Argentina) Matias Zukas	(Russia) Andrey Chepelev (France) Clément Tabur	7–6^{(7–2)}, 6–4
Win	27–12	Sep 2019	M15 Cairo, Egypt	World Tennis Tour	Clay	(United States) Dennis Uspensky	(Russia) Roman Blokhin (Georgia (country)) Zura Tkemaladze	6–1, 6–2
Win	28–12	Jul 2021	M15 L'Aquila, Italy	World Tennis Tour	Clay	(Argentina) Juan Ignacio Galarza	(Italy) Luciano Darderi (United Kingdom) Billy Harris	6–3, 6–1
Loss	28–13	Jul 2021	M15 Perugia, Italy	World Tennis Tour	Clay	(Argentina) Juan Ignacio Galarza	(Italy) Luciano Darderi (United Kingdom) Billy Harris	Walkover
Loss	28–14	Aug 2021	M15 Pescara, Italy	World Tennis Tour	Clay	(Argentina) Alex Barrena	(Italy) Gabriele Piraino (Italy) Giorgio Tabacco	7–5, 4–6, [7–10]
Loss	28–15	Oct 2021	M25 Loulé, Portugal	World Tennis Tour	Hard	(Portugal) Gonçalo Falcão	(Australia) Rinky Hijikata (Netherlands) Mick Veldheer	2–6, 3–6
Loss	28–16	Jul 2022	M15 Bergamo, Italy	World Tennis Tour	Clay	(Argentina) Juan Ignacio Galarza	(Italy) Enrico Dalla Valle (Italy) Julian Ocleppo	3–6, 6–7^{(3–7)}
Loss	28–17	Jul 2022	M15 Sofia, Bulgaria	World Tennis Tour	Clay	(Argentina) Juan Ignacio Galarza	(Bulgaria) Gabriel Donev (Bulgaria) Simon Anthony Ivanov	6–3, 5–7, [9–11]
Loss	28–18	Jul 2022	Verona, Italy	Challenger	Clay	(Argentina) Juan Ignacio Galarza	(Venezuela) Luis David Martínez (Italy) Andrea Vavassori	6–7^{(4–7)}, 6–3, [10–12]
Win	29–18	Oct 2022	M15 Villa Carlos Paz, Argentina	World Tennis Tour	Clay	(Argentina) Juan Ignacio Galarza	(Argentina) Franco Emanuel Egea (Argentina) Gabriel Alejandro Hidalgo	6–3, 7–6^{(7–5)}
Win	30–18	Nov 2022	M15 Luján, Argentina	World Tennis Tour	Clay	(Argentina) Juan Ignacio Galarza	(Argentina) Lorenzo Gagliardo (Uruguay) Franco Roncadelli	6–4, 5–7, 13–11
Loss	30–19	Nov 2023	M15 Monastir, Tunisia	World Tennis Tour	Hard	(Italy) Andrea Picchione	(Tunisia) Aziz Ouakaa (United Kingdom) Oscar Weightman	5–7, 3–6
Loss	30–20	May 2024	M15 Bucharest, Romania	World Tennis Tour	Clay	(Argentina) Juan Bautista Otegui	(Bulgaria) Petr Nesterov (Moldova) Ilya Snitari	7–6^{(7–5)}, 4–6, [7–10]
Win	31–20	Jun 2024	M15 Cluj Napoca, Romania	World Tennis Tour	Clay	(Argentina) Juan Pablo Paz	(Romania) Stefan Palosi (Romania) Radu Mihai Papoe	W/O
