= 2021 Internazionali di Tennis Città di Verona =

- Date: 16–22 August
- Edition: 1st
- Surface: Clay
- Location: Verona, Italy

Champions

Singles
- (Denmark) Holger Rune

Doubles
- (France) Sadio Doumbia / (France) Fabien Reboul
- Internazionali di Tennis Città di Verona

The 2021 Internazionali di Tennis Città di Verona was a professional tennis tournament played on clay courts. It was the first edition of the tournament which was part of the 2021 ATP Challenger Tour. It took place in Verona, Italy, between 16 and 22 August 2021.

== Singles main draw entrants ==
=== Seeds ===
Country	Player	Rank^{1}	Seed
ESP	Carlos Taberner	106	1
KAZ	Dmitry Popko	181	2
ITA	Paolo Lorenzi	189	3
DEN	Holger Rune	191	4
GBR	Jay Clarke	219	5
FRA	Maxime Janvier	235	6
ITA	Lorenzo Giustino	236	7
POR	Gastão Elias	239	8

- ^{1} Rankings as of 9 August 2021.

=== Other entrants ===
The following players received wildcards into the singles main draw:

- (Italy) Marco Bortolotti
- (United States) Fletcher Scott
- (Italy) Giulio Zeppieri

The following player received entry into the singles main draw as a special exempt:

- (Brazil) Orlando Luz

The following player received entry into the singles main draw as an alternate:

- (Italy) Filippo Baldi

The following players received entry from the qualifying draw:

- (Bosnia and Herzegovina) Nerman Fatić
- (Italy) Francesco Forti
- (Croatia) Matija Pecotić
- (Brazil) Matheus Pucinelli de Almeida

== Champions ==
=== Singles ===
- (Denmark) Holger Rune def. (Croatia) Nino Serdarušić 6–4, 6–2.

=== Doubles ===
- (France) Sadio Doumbia / (France) Fabien Reboul def. (Switzerland) Luca Margaroli / (Portugal) Gonçalo Oliveira 7–5, 4–6, [10–6].
