= Federico Arnaboldi =

Italian tennis player (born 2000)

- Country (sports): Italy
- Born: 18 June 2000 (age 26) Como, Italy
- Height: 1.85 m (6 ft 1 in)
- Plays: Right-handed (two-handed backhand)
- Coach: Andrea Arnaboldi
- Prize money: US $322,218

Singles
- Career record: 0–0
- Career titles: 0; 1 Challenger
- Highest ranking: No. 183 (9 June 2025)
- Current ranking: No. 523 (10 August 2026)

Grand Slam singles results
- Australian Open: Q1 (2025)
- French Open: Q3 (2025)
- Wimbledon: Q1 (2025)

Doubles
- Career record: 0–1
- Career titles: 0
- Highest ranking: No. 399 (24 April 2023)
- Current ranking: No. 1,651 (10 August 2026)
- Last updated on: 21 August 2026.

Federico Arnaboldi (born 18 June 2000) is an Italian professional tennis player. He has a career-high ATP singles ranking of No. 183 achieved on 9 June 2025 and a doubles ranking of No. 399, reached on 24 April 2023.

Arnaboldi plays mostly on the ATP Challenger Tour, where he has won one singles title at the 2024 Int. di Verona.

== Career ==
Arnaboldi made his ATP main draw debut at the 2023 Italian Open after receiving a wildcard into the doubles main draw with Gianmarco Ferrari.

== Personal life ==
His cousin, Andrea, is a former tennis player.

== ATP Challenger Tour finals ==
=== Singles: 2 (1 title, 1 runner-up) ===
Legend ATP Challenger Tour (1–1)

Result	W–L	Date	Tournament	Tier	Surface	Opponent	Score
Loss	0–1	Jul 2024	Modena Challenger, Italy	Challenger	Clay	(Spain) Albert Ramos Viñolas	4–6, 6–3, 2–6
Win	1–1	Jul 2024	Internazionali Città di Verona, Italy	Challenger	Clay	(Lithuania) Vilius Gaubas	6–2, 6–2

== ITF World Tennis Tour finals ==
=== Singles: 11 (4 titles, 7 runner-ups) ===
Legend (singles) ITF WTT (4–7)	Finals by surface Hard (0–1) Clay (4–6)

Result	W–L	Date	Tournament	Tier	Surface	Opponent	Score
Loss	0–1	Jun 2021	M15 Heraklion, Greece	WTT	Hard	(Israel) Ben Patael	1–6, 4–6
Win	1–1	Jun 2021	M15 Bergamo, Italy	WTT	Clay	(Italy) Riccardo Balzerani	6–1, 6–2
Win	2–1	Jul 2021	M15 L'Aquila, Italy	WTT	Clay	(Italy) Alexander Weis	4–6, 7–5, 6–1
Win	3–1	Aug 2022	M25 Padova, Italy	WTT	Clay	(Italy) Gabriele Piraino	6–2, 6–1
Loss	3–2	Aug 2022	M25 Lesa, Italy	WTT	Clay	(Italy) Gianmarco Ferrari	2–6, 3–6
Loss	3–3	Mar 2023	M15 Rovinj, Croatia	WTT	Clay	(Croatia) Matej Dodig	0–6, 2–6
Loss	3–4	Jul 2023	M15 Gubbio, Italy	WTT	Clay	(France) Gabriel Debru	4–6, 6–3, 3–6
Loss	3–5	Sep 2023	M25 Santa Margherita di Pula, Italy	WTT	Clay	(Poland) Daniel Michalski	6–2, 4–6, 2–6
Loss	3–6	Mar 2024	M15 Opatija, Croatia	WTT	Clay	(Ukraine) Oleksandr Ovcharenko	1–6, 0–6
Loss	3–7	Apr 2026	M25 Santa Margherita di Pula, Italy	WTT	Clay	(Italy) Francesco Forti	6–3, 3–6, 1–6
Win	4–7	Jun 2026	M15 Bergamo, Italy	WTT	Clay	(Italy) Giovanni Oradini	6–0, 7–5
