= Internazionali di Tennis Città di Verona =

Defunct tennis tournament
- Event name: Internazionali di Tennis Città di Verona
- Location: Verona, Italy
- Venue: Sports Center Verona (2024), Associazione Tennis Verona
- Category: ATP Challenger Tour 100
- Surface: Clay
- Draw: 32S/16D
- Prize money: €120,950
- Website: Website

The Internazionali di Tennis Città di Verona was a professional tennis tournament played on clay courts. It was part of the ATP Challenger Tour. It was held annually in Verona, Italy since 2021. The event was cancelled in 2025.

== Past finals ==
=== Singles ===
Year	Champion	Runner-up	Score
2021	(Denmark) Holger Rune	(Croatia) Nino Serdarušić	6–4, 6–2
2022	(Italy) Francesco Maestrelli	(Argentina) Pedro Cachin	3–6, 6–3, 6–0
2023	(Czech Republic) Vít Kopřiva	(Ukraine) Vitaliy Sachko	1–6, 7–6^{(7–3)}, 6–2
2024	(Italy) Federico Arnaboldi	(Lithuania) Vilius Gaubas	6–2, 6–2

=== Doubles ===
Year	Champions	Runners-up	Score
2021	(France) Sadio Doumbia (France) Fabien Reboul	(Switzerland) Luca Margaroli (Portugal) Gonçalo Oliveira	7–5, 4–6, [10–6]
2022	(Venezuela) Luis David Martínez (Italy) Andrea Vavassori	(Argentina) Juan Ignacio Galarza (Slovenia) Tomás Lipovšek Puches	7–6^{(7–4)}, 3–6, [12–10]
2023	(Italy) Federico Gaio (Italy) Andrea Pellegrino	(Brazil) Daniel Dutra da Silva (Dominican Republic) Nick Hardt	7–6^{(8–6)}, 6–2
2024	(Brazil) Marcelo Demoliner (Argentina) Guillermo Durán	(Bulgaria) Yanaki Milev (Bulgaria) Petr Nesterov	6–7^{(6–8)}, 7–6^{(7–3)}, [15–13]
