= Francesco Maestrelli =

Italian tennis player (born 2002)

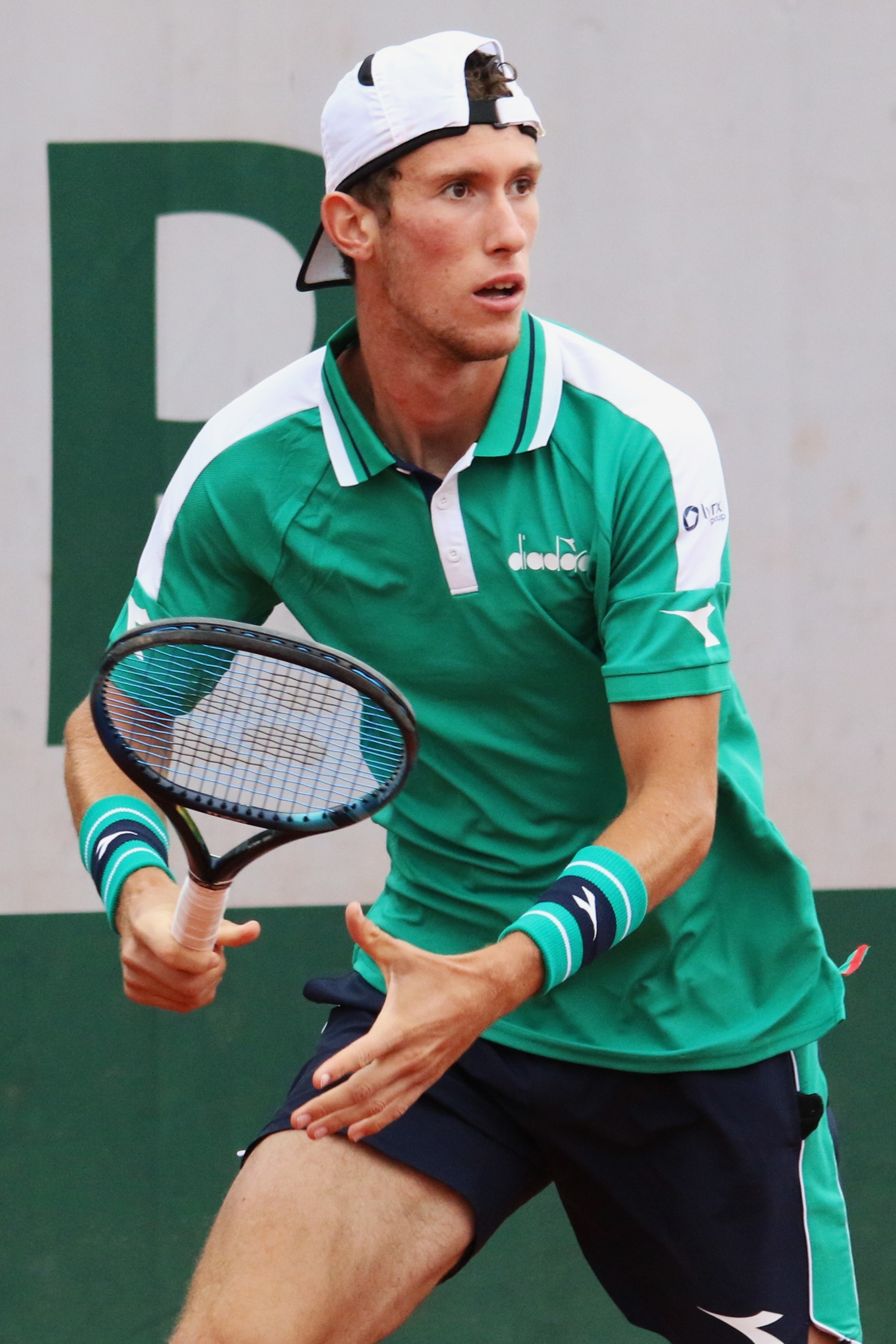
- Maestrelli at the 2023 French Open
- Country (sports): Italy
- Born: 21 December 2002 (age 23) Pisa, Tuscany, Italy
- Height: 1.93 m (6 ft 4 in)
- Turned pro: 2020
- Plays: Right-handed (two-handed backhand)
- Coach: Gabrio Castrichella
- Prize money: US $880,823

Singles
- Career record: 1–3
- Career titles: 0
- Highest ranking: No. 108 (9 February 2026)
- Current ranking: No. 128 (22 June 2026)

Grand Slam singles results
- Australian Open: 2R (2026)
- French Open: Q3 (2024)
- Wimbledon: Q1 (2023, 2024, 2025, 2026)
- US Open: Q3 (2022)

Doubles
- Career record: 0–1
- Career titles: 0
- Highest ranking: No. 318 (21 August 2023)
- Current ranking: No. 467 (22 June 2026)
- Last updated on: 22 June 2026.

Francesco Maestrelli (born 21 December 2002) is an Italian professional tennis player. He has a career-high ATP singles ranking of No. 108 achieved on 9 February 2026 and a doubles ranking of No. 318, reached on 21 August 2023.

Maestrelli plays mostly on the ATP Challenger Tour, where he has won four titles in singles.

== Career ==
=== 2022: Maiden Challenger title, ATP debut ===
In July, Maestrelli won his maiden Challenger title at the 2022 Internazionali di Tennis Città di Verona. In October, Maestrelli received a wild card for his ATP Tour debut at the 2022 Firenze Open, losing to eventual runner up J. J. Wolf in the first round.

=== 2023-2024: Top 150 ===
In June, Maestrelli reached the top 150 following his 2023 Emilia-Romagna Open Challenger final showing in Montechiarugolo, Parma, Italy.

He returned to the top 250 at No. 240 in the singles rankings on 25 November 2024 following his final showing at the 2024 Internazionali di Tennis Città di Rovereto Challenger.

=== 2025: Three Challenger titles, back to top 150 ===
In June, Maestrelli won his third Challenger title at the 2025 Ion Țiriac Challenger, defeating Luka Pavlovic in the final. As a result he returned to the top 200 in the singles rankings.

== Grand Slam performance timeline ==
Key
W	F	SF	QF	#R	RR	Q#	DNQ	A	NH

(W) winner; (F) finalist; (SF) semifinalist; (QF) quarterfinalist; (#R) rounds 4, 3, 2, 1; (RR) round-robin stage; (Q#) qualification round; (DNQ) did not qualify; (A) absent; (NH) not held; (SR) strike rate (events won / competed); (W–L) win–loss record.
To avoid confusion and double counting, these charts are updated at the conclusion of a tournament or when the player's participation has ended.

=== Singles ===
Tournament	2022	2023	2024	2025	2026	W–L
Grand Slam tournaments
Australian Open	A	Q1	Q1	A	2R	1–1
French Open	A	Q1	Q3	A	Q2	0–0
Wimbledon	A	Q1	Q1	Q1		0–0
US Open	Q3	A	A	Q1		0–0
Win–loss	0-0	0–0	0–0	0–0	1–1	1–1

== ATP Challenger Tour Finals ==
=== Singles: 9 (4 titles, 5 runner-ups) ===
Legend ATP Challenger Tour (4–5)	Finals by surface Hard (1–3) Clay (3–2)

Result	W–L	Date	Tournament	Tier	Surface	Opponent	Score
Loss	0–1	May 2022	Internazionali d'Abruzzo, Italy	Challenger	Clay	(Italy) Matteo Arnaldi	3–6, 7–6^{(9–7)}, 4–6
Win	1–1	Jul 2022	Internazionali Città di Verona, Italy	Challenger	Clay	(Argentina) Pedro Cachín	3–6, 6–3, 6–0
Loss	1–2	Jun 2023	Emilia-Romagna Open, Italy	Challenger	Clay	(France) Alexandre Müller	1–6, 4–6
Loss	1–3	Nov 2024	Trofeo Perrel-Faip di Rovereto, Italy	Challenger	Hard (i)	(Italy) Luca Nardi	1–6, 3–6
Win	2–3	May 2025	Abruzzo Open, Italy	Challenger	Clay	(Monaco) Valentin Vacherot	6–4, 6–4
Win	3–3	Jun 2025	Ion Țiriac Challenger, Romania	Challenger	Clay	(France) Luka Pavlovic	7–6^{(9–7)}, 6–4
Loss	3–4	Jul 2025	Porto Open, Portugal	Challenger	Hard	(Tunisia) Moez Echargui	3–6, 2–6
Win	4–4	Nov 2025	Trofeo Faip–Perrel, Italy	Challenger	Hard (i)	(Germany) Marko Topo	6–3, 3–6, 6–1
Loss	4–5	Feb 2026	Tenerife Challenger, Spain	Challenger	Hard	(Spain) Daniel Mérida	2–6, 4–6

=== Doubles: 1 (runner-up) ===
Legend ATP Challenger Tour (0–1)

Result	W–L	Date	Tournament	Tier	Surface	Partner	Opponents	Score
Loss	0–1	Sep 2024	Izida Cup II, Bulgaria	Challenger	Clay	(Italy) Filippo Romano	(Canada) Liam Draxl (Canada) Cleeve Harper	1–6, 6–3, [10–12]

== ITF Tour Finals ==
=== Singles: 2 (2 titles) ===
Legend ITF WTT (2–0)

Result	W–L	Date	Tournament	Tier	Surface	Opponent	Score
Win	1–0	Nov 2021	M15 Heraklion, Greece	WTT	Hard	(United Kingdom) Alastair Gray	6–0, 3–6, 7–5
Win	2–0	Apr 2022	M25 Santa Margherita di Pula, Italy	WTT	Clay	(Italy) Edoardo Lavagno	6–1, 6–3
