= Tennis in Australia =

Tennis in Australia refers to the sport of tennis played in Australia. Tennis in Australia has been administered by Tennis Australia (formerly the Lawn Tennis Association of Australia (LTAA)) since 1904.

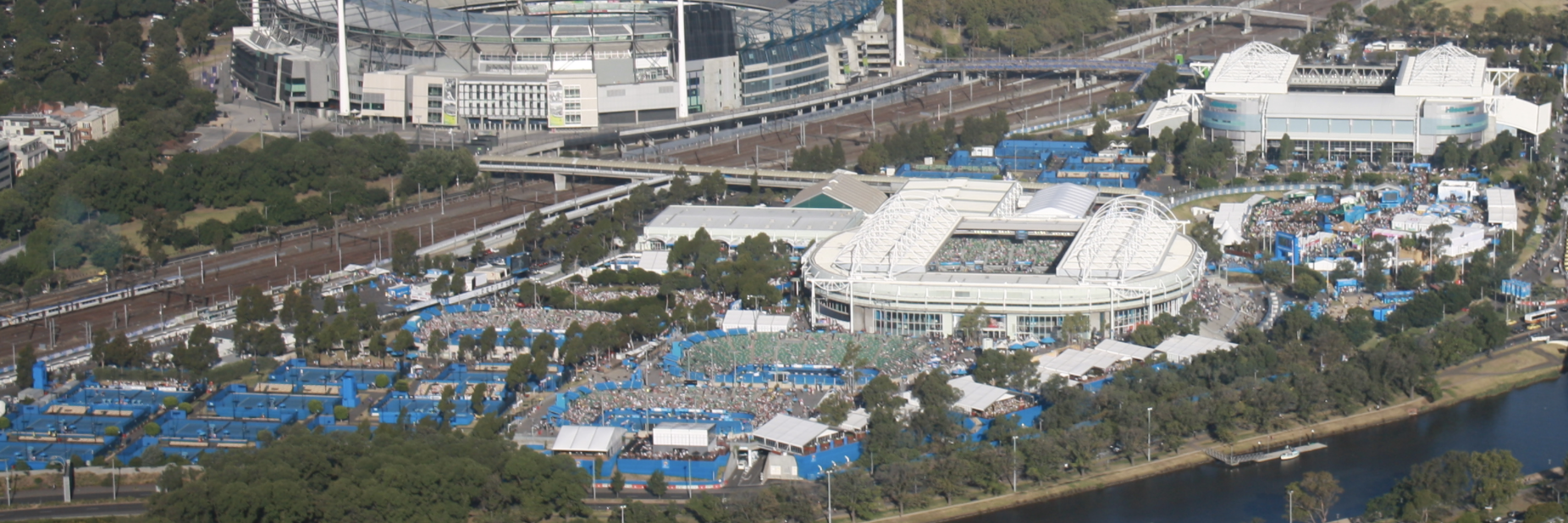
Melbourne Park - Home to the Australian Open since 1988

Australia hosts the first of the four Grand Slam events of the year, the Australian Open. The Australian Open is managed by Tennis Australia and was first played in Melbourne in 1905. The tournament was first known as the Australasian Championships and then became the Australian Championships in 1927 and the Australian Open in 1969.

== History ==
In the 1950s, Australia became a tennis power, and Australian men won the Davis Cup 15 times from 1950 to 1967, led by outstanding players such as Frank Sedgman, Ken Rosewall, Lew Hoad, Roy Emerson, and Ashley Cooper.

Rod Laver has twice achieved the Grand Slam in men's singles, in 1962 and 1969, the only tennis player to have accomplished this feat. Fellow Australian tennis player Margaret Smith Court also achieved the Grand Slam in women's singles in 1970, Margaret Court also holds the record for the greatest number of women's singles Grand Slams won and is one of only three players ever to have won a career Grand Slam "boxed set"

== Major tournaments and current champions ==
=== Most recent finals ===
| 2025 Event | Champion | Runner-up | Score |
|---|---|---|---|
| Men's singles | (Italy) Jannik Sinner | (Germany) Alexander Zverev | 6–3, 7–6^{(7–4)}, 6–3 |
| Women's singles | (United States) Madison Keys | Aryna Sabalenka | 6–3, 2–6, 7–5 |
| Men's doubles | (Finland) Harri Heliövaara (United Kingdom) Henry Patten | (Italy) Simone Bolelli (Italy) Andrea Vavassori | 6–7^{(16–18)}, 7–6^{(7–5)}, 6–3 |
| Women's doubles | (Czech Republic) Kateřina Siniaková (United States) Taylor Townsend | (Chinese Taipei) Hsieh Su-wei (Latvia) Jeļena Ostapenko | 6–2, 6–7^{(4–7)}, 6–3 |
| Mixed doubles | (Australia) Olivia Gadecki (Australia) John Peers | (Australia) Kimberly Birrell (Australia) John-Patrick Smith | 3–6, 6–4, [10–6] |

=== Pre–Australian Open ===
| Tournament | Category | Current champion | Current runner-up | Score |
|---|---|---|---|---|
| United Cup | Mixed Team | (United States) USA; Coco Gauff; Taylor Fritz | Poland; Iga Świątek; Hubert Hurkacz | 2–0 |
| Brisbane International | ATP 250 | (Czech Republic) Jiří Lehečka | (United States) Reilly Opelka | 4–1ret |
| Brisbane International | WTA 500 | Aryna Sabalenka | Polina Kudermetova | 4–6, 6–3, 6–2 |
| Adelaide International | ATP 250 | (Canada) Félix Auger-Aliassime | (United States) Sebastian Korda | 6–3, 3–6, 6–1 |
| Adelaide International | WTA 500 | (United States) Madison Keys | (United States) Jessica Pegula | 6–3, 4–6, 6–1 |
| Hobart International | WTA 250 | (United States) McCartney Kessler | (Belgium) Elise Mertens | 6–4, 3–6, 6–0 |

== Lower Tier Tournaments ==
=== ATP Challenger Tour ===
The ATP Challenger Tour is the second tier of professional tennis tournaments run by the Association of Tennis Professionals. These tournaments offer up to 175 rankings points with five Challenger events currently held in Australia, Canberra in the first week of the tour, back-to-back events in Burnie, Tasmania in the fortnight following the Australian Open and in Playford, South Australia then Sydney, New South Wales in the fortnight following the ATP Tour's Asian Swing.

| Tournament | Points | Most Recent | Champion | Runner-up | Score |
|---|---|---|---|---|---|
| Canberra Tennis International | 125 | January, 2025 | (Brazil) João Fonseca | (United States) Ethan Quinn | 6–4, 6–4 |
| Queensland International | 75 | January, 2025 | (Australia) Tristan Schoolkate | (Czech Republic) Alex Bolt | 7–6^{(7–3)}, 7–6^{(7–4)} |
| Queensland International II | 75 | February, 2025 | (Australia) Adam Walton | (Australia) Jason Kubler | 7–6^{(8–6)}, 7–6^{(7–4)} |
| City of Playford Tennis International | 75 | October, 2024 | (Australia) Rinky Hijikata | (Japan) Yuta Shimizu | 6–4, 7–6^{(7–4)} |
| NSW Open Challenger | 75 | October, 2024 | (Australia) Thanasi Kokkinakis | (Australia) Rinky Hijikata | 6–1, 6–1 |

=== WTA 125 Tournaments ===
The WTA 125 Tournaments is the second tier of WTA events with each event worth 125 points. There are 20 WTA 125 Tournaments, one of which is held in Canberra, simultaneously with the ATP Challenger event.

| Tournament | Points | Most Recent | Champion | Runner-up | Score |
|---|---|---|---|---|---|
| Canberra Tennis International | 175 | January, 2025 | (Japan) Aoi Ito | (China) Wei Sijia | 6–4, 6–3 |

=== ITF Tour ===
The lowest tier of professional tennis tournaments are the ITF Men's World Tennis Tour and the ITF Women's World Tennis Tour run by the International Tennis Federation (ITF). These tournaments serve as entry level events for the ATP and WTA tours and offer points and prize money.

==== Men's ITF Tournaments ====
All tournaments are played on hard courts with the exception of Mildura and Swan Hill which are played on Grass.

| Tournament | Points | Most Recent | Champion | Runner-up | Score |
|---|---|---|---|---|---|
| Traralgon, VIC | 25 | February, 2024 | (Australia) Omar Jasika | (Australia) Li Tu | 7–6^{(7–1)}, 6–2 |
| Traralgon II, VIC | 25 | February, 2024 | (Australia) Li Tu | (Australia) Alex Bolt | 6–4, 6–2 |
| Mildura, VIC | 25 | March, 2024 | (Australia) Alex Bolt | (Australia) Luke Saville | 6–2, 6–2 |
| Swan Hill, VIC | 25 | March, 2024 | (Australia) Alex Bolt | (Japan) Rio Noguchi | 6–1, 6–2 |
| Darwin, NT | 25 | September, 2024 | (Australia) Omar Jasika | (Australia) Jake Delaney | 7–5, 7–5 |
| Darwin II, NT | 25 | September, 2024 | (Australia) Omar Jasika | (New Zealand) James Watt | 1–6, 6–3, 6–4 |
| Cairns, QLD | 25 | September, 2024 | (Japan) Rio Noguchi | (Australia) Blake Ellis | 6–7^{(5–7)}, 6–4, 7–6^{(7–4)} |
| Cairns II, QLD | 25 | October, 2024 | (Australia) Omar Jasika | (Australia) Marc Polmans | 6–3, 6–4 |
| Brisbane, QLD | 25 | November, 2024 | (Australia) Blake Ellis | (Australia) Blake Mott | 6–1, 6–3 |
| Caloundra, QLD | 25 | November, 2024 | (United States) Christian Langmo | (New Zealand) Ajeet Rai | 7–6^{(7–4)}, 1–6, 6–4 |
| Gold Coast, QLD | 25 | November, 2024 | (Australia) Matthew Dellavedova | (Australia) Jason Kubler | 3–6, 6–3, 6–2 |

==== Women's ITF Tournaments ====
All tournaments are played on hard courts with the exception of Mildura and Swan Hill which are played on Grass.

| Tournament | Points | Most Recent | Champion | Runner-up | Score |
|---|---|---|---|---|---|
| Brisbane, QLD | 75 | January, 2025 | (Australia) Priscilla Hon | (Switzerland) Leonie Küng | 6–4, 4–6, 6–2 |
| Brisbane II, QLD | 75 | February, 2025 | (Australia) Kimberly Birrell | (Australia) Maddison Inglis | 6–2, 4–6, 7–6^{(7–2)} |
| Traralgon, VIC | 35 | February, 2024 | (United Kingdom) Amarni Banks | (Japan) Naho Sato | 6–3, 6–3 |
| Traralgon II, VIC | 35 | February, 2024 | (Thailand) Lanlana Tararudee | (China) Ma Yexin | 6–4, 7–5 |
| Mildura, VIC | 35 | March, 2024 | (Australia) Maddison Inglis | (Australia) Tina Nadine Smith | 6–4, 6–1 |
| Swan Hill, VIC | 35 | March, 2024 | (Australia) Gabriella Da Silva-Fick | (Australia) Emerson Jones | 3–6, 6–3, 6–1 |
| Perth, WA | 75 | September, 2024 | (Australia) Talia Gibson | (Australia) Maddison Inglis | 6–7^{(5–7)}, 6–1, 6–3 |
| Perth II, WA | 75 | September, 2024 | (Australia) Talia Gibson | (Japan) Eri Shimizu | 6–2, 6–4 |
| Cairns, QLD | 35 | September, 2024 | (Australia) Talia Gibson | (Australia) Lizette Cabrera | 6–2, 7–6^{(7–2)} |
| Cairns II, QLD | 35 | October, 2024 | (Australia) Destanee Aiava | (Australia) Maddison Inglis | 6–2, 4–6, 7–5 |
| Playford, SA | 75 | October, 2024 | (Australia) Maddison Inglis | (Japan) Himeno Sakatsume | 7–6^{(9–7)}, 5–7, 6–1 |
| Sydney, NSW | 75 | October, 2024 | (Australia) Emerson Jones | (Australia) Taylah Preston | 6–4, 7–6^{(7–3)} |
| Brisbane, QLD | 50 | November, 2024 | (Australia) Destanee Aiava | (Australia) Lizette Cabrera | 7–6^{(7–4)}, 4–6, 6–3 |
| Caloundra, QLD | 50 | November, 2024 | (Australia) Priscilla Hon | (Japan) Himeno Sakatsume | 6–4, 7–5 |
| Gold Coast, QLD | 75 | November, 2024 | (Australia) Daria Saville | (Australia) Lizette Cabrera | 7–5, 7–6^{(7–3)} |

== Highest ranked players ==
=== Number 1 Ranked Players ===
==== Men's Singles ====
| Player | # | Start date | End date | Weeks | Total Weeks |
|---|---|---|---|---|---|
| John Newcombe | 2 | Jun 3, 1974 | Jul 28, 1974 | 8 | 8 |
| Pat Rafter | 17 | Jul 26, 1999 | Aug 1, 1999 | 1 | 1 |
| Lleyton Hewitt | 20 | Nov 19, 2001 | Apr 27, 2003 | 75 | 80 |
| Lleyton Hewitt | 20 | May 12, 2003 | Jun 15, 2003 | 5 | 80 |

==== Women's Singles ====
| Player | # | Start date | End date | Weeks | Total Weeks |
|---|---|---|---|---|---|
| Evonne Goolagong Cawley | 2 | Apr 26, 1976 | May 9, 1976 | 2 | 2 |
| Ashleigh Barty | 27 | Jun 24, 2019 | Aug 11, 2019 | 7 | 121 |
| Ashleigh Barty | 27 | Sep 9, 2019 | Mar 22, 2020 | 28 | 121 |
| Ashleigh Barty | 27 | Aug 10, 2020 | Apr 3, 2022 | 86 | 121 |

==== Men's Doubles ====
| Player | # | Start date | End date | Weeks | Total Weeks |
|---|---|---|---|---|---|
| Paul McNamee | 7 | May 25, 1981 | Jun 14, 1981 | 3 | 3 |
| John Fitzgerald | 24 | Jul 8, 1991 | Feb 23, 1992 | 33 | 1 |
| John Fitzgerald | 24 | Mar 2, 1992 | Mar 8, 1992 | 1 | 40 |
| John Fitzgerald | 24 | May 4, 1992 | Jun 14, 1992 | 6 | 40 |
| Todd Woodbridge | 25 | Jul 6, 1992 | Jul 19, 1992 | 2 | 205 |
| Todd Woodbridge | 25 | Aug 17, 1992 | Sep 13, 1992 | 5 | 205 |
| Todd Woodbridge | 25 | Nov 2, 1992 | Nov 15, 1992 | 2 | 205 |
| Todd Woodbridge | 25 | Jun 14, 1993 | Oct 17, 1993 | 18 | 205 |
| Todd Woodbridge | 25 | Nov 8, 1993 | Nov 8, 1993 | 1 | 205 |
| Todd Woodbridge | 25 | Sep 11, 1995 | Oct 29, 1995 | 7 | 205 |
| Todd Woodbridge | 25 | Nov 6, 1995 | Mar 29, 1998 | 125 | 205 |
| Todd Woodbridge | 25 | Jun 12, 2000 | Oct 29, 2000 | 20 | 205 |
| Todd Woodbridge | 25 | Jan 8, 2001 | Jul 8, 2001 | 26 | 205 |
| Mark Woodforde | 27 | Nov 16, 1992 | Jan 31, 1993 | 11 | 83 |
| Mark Woodforde | 27 | Apr 3, 1995 | Jun 11, 1995 | 10 | 83 |
| Mark Woodforde | 27 | Oct 14, 1996 | Oct 12, 1997 | 52 | 83 |
| Mark Woodforde | 27 | Oct 30, 2000 | Jan 7, 2001 | 10 | 83 |
| Matthew Ebden | 62 | Feb 26, 2024 | Mar 3, 2024 | 1 | 9 |
| Matthew Ebden | 62 | Apr 15, 2024 | May 5, 2024 | 3 | 9 |
| Matthew Ebden | 62 | Jun 10, 2024 | Jul 14, 2024 | 5 | 9 |

==== Women's Doubles ====
| Player | # | Start date | End date | Weeks | Total Weeks |
|---|---|---|---|---|---|
| Rennae Stubbs | 14 | Aug 21, 2000 | Sep 10, 2000 | 3 | 3 |
| Samantha Stosur | 21 | Feb 6, 2006 | Jul 6, 2006 | 22 | 61 |
| Samantha Stosur | 21 | Jul 7, 2006 | Apr 8, 2007 | 39 | 61 |
| Storm Hunter | 48 | Nov 6, 2023 | Jan 28, 2024 | 12 | 12 |

=== Top 10 Ranked Players ===
The lists include Australian players who have had a ranking inside the ATP or WTA top 10. The rankings were introduced in 1973 (men) and 1975 (women).

==== Men's Singles ====
| Player | Ranking | Date reached top 10 | ATP Tour | | |
| Player | High | Date reached top 10 | Turned Pro | Retired | Titles |
|---|---|---|---|---|---|
| John Newcombe | 1 | 1973, 23 August | 1967 | 1981 | 41 |
| Pat Rafter | 1 | 1997, 8 September | 1991 | 2002 | 11 |
| Lleyton Hewitt | 1 | 2000, 15 May | 1998 | 2016 | 30 |
| Ken Rosewall | 2 | 1973, 23 August | 1956 | 1980 | 14 |
| Rod Laver | 3 | 1973, 23 August | 1963 | 1979 | 72 |
| Pat Cash | 4 | 1984, 10 September | 1982 | 1997 | 6 |
| Alex de Minaur | 6 | 2024, January 8 | 2015 | Active | 9 |
| Peter McNamara | 7 | 1981, 6 July | 1974 | 1987 | 5 |
| Tony Roche | 8 | 1975, 26 July | 1963 | 1979 | 46 |
| John Alexander | 8 | 1975, 21 October | 1967 | 1985 | 7 |
| Mark Philippoussis | 8 | 1999, 29 March | 1994 | 2008 | 11 |

==== Women's Singles ====
| Player | Ranking | Date reached top 10 | WTA Tour | | |
| Player | High | Date reached top 10 | Turned Pro | Retired | Titles |
|---|---|---|---|---|---|
| Evonne Goolagong Cawley | 1 | 1975, November 3 | 1967 | 1983 | 86 |
| Ashleigh Barty | 1 | 2019, April 1 | 2010 | 2022 | 15 |
| Wendy Turnbull | 3 | 1977, November 27 | 1975 | 1989 | 11 |
| Hana Mandlikova | 3 | 1980, June 9 | 1978 | 1990 | 27 |
| Dianne Fromholtz | 4 | 1976, September 14 | 1973 | 1990 | 8 |
| Margaret Court | 5 | 1975, November 3 | 1960 | 1977 | 92 |
| Jelena Dokic | 4 | 2001, October 8 | 1998 | 2014 | 6 |
| Samantha Stosur | 4 | 2010, March 22 | 1999 | 2023 | 9 |
| Kerry Melville | 7 | 1975, November 3 | 1963 | 1979 | 22 |
| Alicia Molik | 8 | 2005, January 31 | 1996 | 2011 | 5 |

=== Doubles ===
The rankings were introduced in 1976 (men) and 1984 (women).

==== Men ====
| Player | Ranking No. | ATP Tour | | |
| Player | High | Turned Pro | Retired | Titles |
|---|---|---|---|---|
| Paul McNamee | 1 | 1973 | 1988 | 23 |
| John Fitzgerald | 1 | 1980 | 1997 | 30 |
| Todd Woodbridge | 1 | 1988 | 2005 | 83 |
| Mark Woodforde | 1 | 1984 | 2000 | 67 |
| Matthew Ebden | 1 | 2006 | Active | 11 |
| John Peers | 2 | 2011 | Active | 28 |
| Peter McNamara | 3 | 1974 | 1987 | 19 |
| Mark Edmondson | 3 | 1975 | 1987 | 34 |
| Jordan Thompson | 3 | 2013 | Active | 7 |

==== Women ====
| Player | Ranking No. | WTA Tour | | |
| Player | High | Turned Pro | Retired | Titles |
|---|---|---|---|---|
| Rennae Stubbs | 1 | 1992 | 2011 | 60 |
| Sam Stosur | 1 | 1999 | 2023 | 27 |
| Storm Hunter | 1 | 2013 | Active | 8 |
| Casey Dellacqua | 3 | 2002 | 2018 | 7 |
| Elizabeth Smylie | 5 | 1982 | 1997 | 36 |
| Ashleigh Barty | 5 | 2010 | 2022 | 12 |

== Performance timelines since 2000 ==
Key
| W | F | SF | QF | #R | RR | Q# | DNQ | A | NH |

(W) winner; (F) finalist; (SF) semifinalist; (QF) quarterfinalist; (#R) rounds 4, 3, 2, 1; (RR) round-robin stage; (Q#) qualification round; (DNQ) did not qualify; (A) absent; (NH) not held; (SR) strike rate (events won / competed); (W–L) win–loss record.
To avoid confusion and double counting, these charts are updated at the conclusion of a tournament or when the player's participation has ended.

=== Men's singles ===
| Tournament | 2000 | 2001 | 2002 | 2003 | 2004 | 2005 | 2006 | 2007 | 2008 | 2009 | 2010 | 2011 | 2012 | 2013 | 2014 | 2015 | 2016 | 2017 | 2018 | 2019 | 2020 | 2021 | 2022 | 2023 | 2024 | 2025 | SR |
|---|---|---|---|---|---|---|---|---|---|---|---|---|---|---|---|---|---|---|---|---|---|---|---|---|---|---|---|
Grand Slam tournaments
| Australian Open | 4R | SF | 2R | 4R | 4R | F | 3R | 3R | 4R | 2R | 4R | 3R | 4R | 2R | 2R | QF | 4R | 3R | 4R | 3R | 4R | 3R | 4R | 4R | 4R | QF | 0 / 26 |
| French Open | 4R | QF | 4R | 3R | QF | 2R | 4R | 4R | 3R | 3R | 3R | 1R | 2R | 2R | 2R | 3R | 3R | 2R | 1R | 3R | 2R | 2R | 2R | 3R | QF | | 0 / 25 |
| Wimbledon | F | F | W | F | QF | SF | QF | 4R | 4R | QF | 4R | QF | 1R | 4R | QF | 4R | 4R | 1R | 3R | 3R | NH | 3R | F | 3R | QF | | 1 / 24 |
| US Open | SF | W | SF | QF | F | SF | QF | 2R | 2R | 3R | 2R | 2R | 3R | 4R | 3R | 3R | 3R | 3R | QF | 4R | QF | 3R | QF | 4R | QF | | 1 / 25 |
Year-end championship
| ATP Finals | RR | W | W | DNQ | F | A | Did not qualify | | | | | | | | | | | | | | | | | | RR | | 2 / 5 |

=== Women's singles ===
| Tournament | 2000 | 2001 | 2002 | 2003 | 2004 | 2005 | 2006 | 2007 | 2008 | 2009 | 2010 | 2011 | 2012 | 2013 | 2014 | 2015 | 2016 | 2017 | 2018 | 2019 | 2020 | 2021 | 2022 | 2023 | 2024 | 2025 | SR |
|---|---|---|---|---|---|---|---|---|---|---|---|---|---|---|---|---|---|---|---|---|---|---|---|---|---|---|---|
| Australian Open | 3R | 3R | 2R | 4R | 4R | QF | 4R | 3R | 4R | QF | 4R | 3R | 2R | 2R | 4R | 2R | 4R | 4R | 3R | QF | SF | QF | W | 2R | 3R | 2R | 1 / 26 |
| French Open | 2R | 3R | 3R | 2R | 2R | 2R | 3R | 3R | 3R | SF | F | 3R | SF | 3R | 4R | 3R | SF | 4R | 3R | W | 2R | 2R | 3R | 2R | 1R | | 1 / 25 |
| Wimbledon | SF | 2R | 1R | 3R | 4R | 2R | 3R | 2R | 3R | 3R | 4R | 3R | 2R | 3R | 2R | 3R | 2R | 2R | 3R | 4R | NH | W | QF | 1R | 2R | | 1 / 24 |
| US Open | 4R | 3R | 2R | 3R | 2R | 2R | 2R | 2R | 2R | 3R | QF | W | QF | 2R | 4R | 4R | 2R | 3R | 4R | 4R | 1R | 3R | QF | 2R | 2R | | 1 / 25 |
Year-end championship
| WTA Finals | Did not qualify | | | | | | | | | | SF | SF | RR | Did not qualify | | | | | | W | NH | Did not qualify | | | | | 1 / 4 |

== Davis Cup ==
See: Australian Davis Cup Team

Titles - 28 (1907, 1908, 1909, 1911, 1914, 1919, 1939, 1950, 1951, 1952, 1953, 1955, 1956, 1957, 1959, 1960, 1961, 1962, 1964, 1965, 1966, 1967, 1973, 1977, 1983, 1986, 1999, 2003).

Runners-up - 21 (1912, 1920, 1922, 1923, 1924, 1936, 1938, 1946, 1947, 1948, 1949, 1954, 1958, 1963, 1968, 1990, 1993, 2000, 2001, 2022, 2023).

== Billie Jean King Cup ==
Formerly named Fed Cup

See: Australia Fed Cup team

Titles - 7 (1964, 1965, 1968, 1970, 1971, 1973, 1974)

Runners-up - 11 (1963, 1969, 1975, 1976, 1977, 1978, 1979, 1980, 1984, 1993, 2019, 2022)

== Olympic Medals ==
| Result | Year | City | Surface | Division | Player(s) | Opponent(s) | Score |
|---|---|---|---|---|---|---|---|
| Bronze | 1988 | Seoul, South Korea | Hard | Women's doubles | (Australia) Elizabeth Smylie (Australia) Wendy Turnbull | n/a | n/a |
| Bronze | 1992 | Barcelona, Spain | Clay | Women's doubles | (Australia) Rachel McQuillan (Australia) Nicole Provis | n/a | n/a |
| Gold | 1996 | Atlanta, Georgia, US | Hard | Men's doubles | (Australia) Todd Woodbridge (Australia) Mark Woodforde | (United Kingdom) Neil Broad (United Kingdom) Tim Henman | 6–4, 6–4, 6–2 |
| Silver | 2000 | Sydney, Australia | Hard | Men's doubles | (Australia) Todd Woodbridge (Australia) Mark Woodforde | (Canada) Sébastien Lareau (Canada) Daniel Nestor | 7–5, 3–6, 4–6, 6–7 |
| Bronze | 2004 | Athens, Greece | Hard | Women's singles | (Australia) Alicia Molik | (Russia) Anastasia Myskina | 6–3, 6–4 |
| Bronze | 2020 | Tokyo, Japan | Hard | Mixed doubles | (Australia) Ashleigh Barty (Australia) John Peers | (Serbia) Novak Djokovic (Serbia) Nina Stojanović | w/o |
| Gold | 2024 | Paris, France | Clay | Men's doubles | (Australia) Matthew Ebden (Australia) John Peers | (United States) Austin Krajicek (United States) Rajeev Ram | 6–7^{(6–8)}, 7–6^{(7–1)}, [10–8] |

== Broadcasting ==
=== Australian Open ===
From 1973 until 2018, the Australian Open was broadcast in Australia on the Seven Network. In March, 2018 it was announced that rival network, the Nine Network had won the rights to televise the tournament for $60 million per year, for five years between 2020 and 2024. While the contract was not to begin until 2020, the Nine Network, incumbent rights holders the Seven Network and Tennis Australia negotiated to bring this forward by one year allowing Nine to telecast the Australian Open from 2019. In 2022 the Nine Network and Tennis Australia agreed to a further five years with Nine paying $85 million per year to telecast the event from 2025 until 2029. In addition to the Australian Open, Nine have the exclusive rights to televise the Australian-held lead in events including the United Cup, Brisbane International, Adelaide International and formerly the Hopman Cup, ATP Cup Sydney International and temporary Melbourne events held in 2021.

Presently Nine dedicate two linear broadcast channels to the Australian Open, the main channel Channel 9 and secondary channel 9Gem with the tennis moving to 9Go! during the hour long Nine News bulletin between 6pm and 7pm. Furthermore, all matches, on all courts are available to stream for free through Nine's live stream, video on demand and catch-up TV service 9Now with matches also available without commercials and on demand through Nine's subscription sports streaming service Stan Sport.

=== French Open ===
Since 2021, the Nine Network is the Australian broadcast holder with coverage on secondary channel 9Gem. Additional courts are available to stream via Stan Sport, a pay for view streaming service owned by Nine. Previously, subscription television service Foxtel had the rights to the French Open with SBS Australia simulcasting World-feed coverage from 10:30pm AEST.

=== Wimbledon ===
The Nine Network broadcast the Wimbledon Championships for over 40 years until losing the rights to rivals Seven Network following the 2010 tournament at the time citing declining ratings. While Seven had the Wimbledon rights, there was also an agreement with subscription television service Foxtel who had rights to televise select matches until the quarterfinals with Seven getting first pick at two daily matches they would be able to televise exclusively. In late 2020 Nine regained exclusive rights to the Championships signing a three-year contract to broadcast the championships until 2023. In addition to what was televised via their terrestrial free-to-air channel (either Channel 9 or secondary channel 9Gem), all matches are able to be streamed via Stan Sport, a pay for view streaming service owned by Nine.

=== US Open ===
The Nine Network is the current broadcast holder of the US Open having gained the rights to the event from 2022 making the Nine Network the home of Australian tennis with all four Grand Slams and Australian Open lead in events as well as all Australian rubbers of the Davis Cup and the Billie Jean King Cup. Matches are televised on 9Gem with additional courts able to be stream via Stan Sport, a pay for view streaming service owned by Nine. Prior to Nine, subscription channel ESPN Australia broadcast the US Open simulcasting coverage from their American counterparts with localised coverage occurring for matches involving Australian players. Additionally, between 2019 and 2021 SBS Australia simulcast coverage of the Quarterfinals onwards using the World Feed.

=== Davis Cup ===
Australian ties are broadcast on the Nine Network with other ties on subscription service BeIN Sports Australia.

=== Billie Jean King Cup ===
Australian ties are broadcast on the Nine Network with other ties on subscription service BeIN Sports Australia.

=== ATP Tour Events ===
Since 2021 all ATP Masters 1000 tournaments and ATP 500 tournaments as well as ATP 250 tournaments with the exception of the Brisbane and Adelaide Internationals, are broadcast on BeIN Sports a subscription service available through Amazon Prime Video and through BeIN Sports directly. Prior to 2021, ATP Masters 1000 and 500 tournaments were televised on ESPN Australia with non-Australian ATP 250 tournaments on Fox Sports Australia.

=== WTA Tour Events ===
All Women's Tennis Association (WTA) Tour events, with the exception of the Brisbane, Adelaide and Hobart Internationals are televised on BeIN Sports a subscription service available through Amazon Prime Video and through BeIN Sports directly. In 2021, BeIN Sports signed a deal with the WTA giving them broadcast rights until 2026.

== See also ==
- Category:Australian tennis players
- List of Australia Davis Cup team representatives
- List of Australia Fed Cup team representatives
