= 2024 Perth Tennis International =

Tennis tournament

- Date: 9–15 September 2024
- Edition: 16th
- Category: ITF Women's World Tennis Tour
- Prize money: $60,000
- Surface: Hard / Outdoor
- Location: Perth, Australia

Champions

Singles
- (Australia) Talia Gibson

Doubles
- (Australia) Talia Gibson / (Australia) Maddison Inglis
← 2023 ·	Perth Tennis International	· 2025 →

The 2024 Perth Tennis International was a professional tennis tournament played on outdoor hard courts. It was the sixteenth edition of the tournament, which was part of the 2024 ITF Women's World Tennis Tour. It took place in Perth, Australia, between 9 and 15 September 2024.

== Champions ==
=== Singles ===
- (Australia) Talia Gibson def. (Australia) Maddison Inglis, 6–7^{(5–7)}, 6–1, 6–3

=== Doubles ===
- (Australia) Talia Gibson / (Australia) Maddison Inglis def. (Japan) Erina Hayashi / (Japan) Saki Imamura, 6–2, 6–4

== Singles main draw entrants ==
=== Seeds ===
Country	Player	Rank	Seed
AUS	Talia Gibson	170	1
AUS	Destanee Aiava	194	2
AUS	Maddison Inglis	228	3
JPN	Aoi Ito	230	4
JPN	Sayaka Ishii	274	5
CHN	Lu Jiajing	278	6
IND	Ankita Raina	283	7
JPN	Kyōka Okamura	306	8

- Rankings are as of 26 August 2024.

=== Other entrants ===
The following players received wildcards into the singles main draw:

- (Australia) Alexandra Bozovic
- (Australia) Lizette Cabrera
- (Australia) Tahlia Kokkinis
- (Australia) Alicia Smith

The following players received entry from the qualifying draw:

- (Japan) Haruna Arakawa
- (Japan) Natsuho Arakawa
- (United Kingdom) Naiktha Bains
- (Japan) Ayumi Koshiishi
- (Australia) Elena Micic
- (Japan) Chihiro Muramatsu
- (Japan) Erika Sema
- (Australia) Stefani Webb
