= 2024 Perth Tennis International – Doubles =

Doubles
- 2024 Perth Tennis International

Final
- Champions: (Australia) Talia Gibson (Australia) Maddison Inglis
- Runners-up: (Japan) Erina Hayashi (Japan) Saki Imamura
- Score: 6–2, 6–4

Events
Singles	Doubles
← 2023 ·	Perth Tennis International	· 2025 →

Destanee Aiava and Maddison Inglis were the defending champions but chose to participate with different partners. Aiava partnered alongside Petra Hule but lost in the first round to Paige Hourigan and Erika Sema.

Inglis partnered Talia Gibson and successfully defended her title, defeating Erina Hayashi and Saki Imamura in the final, 6–2, 6–4.

== Seeds ==
1. (Japan) Naho Sato / (Japan) Ayano Shimizu (quarterfinals)
2. (Australia) Talia Gibson / (Australia) Maddison Inglis (champions)
3. (United Kingdom) Naiktha Bains / (India) Ankita Raina (first round)
4. (Australia) Destanee Aiava / (Australia) Petra Hule (first round)

== Draw ==
=== Key ===
- Q = Qualifier
- WC = Wild card
- LL = Lucky loser
- Alt = Alternate
- SE = Special exempt
- PR = Protected ranking
- ITF = ITF entry
- JE = Junior exempt
- w/o = Walkover
- r = Retired
- d = Defaulted
- SR = Special ranking

First round
1	(Japan) N Sato (Japan) A Shimizu	6	6
WC	(Australia) S McDonald (Australia) S Rokusek	1	0
(Japan) E Hayashi (Japan) S Imamura	3	6	[10]
(Australia) A Osborne (Australia) A Smith	6	0	[8]
4	(Australia) D Aiava (Australia) P Hule	6	4	[6]
(New Zealand) P Hourigan (Japan) E Sema	2	6	[10]
(New Zealand) M Barry (Australia) E Micic	6	6
(Australia) G Da Silva-Fick (Australia) A Parnaby	2	4
WC	(Australia) A Katz (Australia) T Kokkinis	6	6
WC	(Australia) E Nurkic (Australia) A Stevens	3	2
(Japan) S Ishii (Japan) A Ito	7	6
3	(United Kingdom) N Bains (India) A Raina	5	4
(Australia) A Bozovic (Australia) L Cabrera	0	3
(Japan) S Hosogi (Japan) M Matsuda	6	6
(Japan) H Arakawa (India) S Bhamidipaty	1	6^{4}
2	(Australia) T Gibson (Australia) M Inglis	6	7^{7}

Quarterfinals
1	(Japan) N Sato (Japan) A Shimizu	0	1
(Japan) E Hayashi (Japan) S Imamura	6	6
(New Zealand) P Hourigan (Japan) E Sema	6	6
(New Zealand) M Barry (Australia) E Micic	3	0
WC	(Australia) A Katz (Australia) T Kokkinis	4	3
(Japan) S Ishii (Japan) A Ito	6	6
(Japan) S Hosogi (Japan) M Matsuda	2	7	[5]
2	(Australia) T Gibson (Australia) M Inglis	6	5	[10]

Semifinals
(Japan) E Hayashi (Japan) S Imamura	4	6	[10]
(New Zealand) P Hourigan (Japan) E Sema	6	1	[7]
(Japan) S Ishii (Japan) A Ito	1	6	[6]
2	(Australia) T Gibson (Australia) M Inglis	6	4	[10]

Final
(Japan) E Hayashi (Japan) S Imamura	2	4
2	(Australia) T Gibson (Australia) M Inglis	6	6
