= 2024 Perth Tennis International – Singles =

Singles
- 2024 Perth Tennis International

Final
- Champion: (Australia) Talia Gibson
- Runner-up: (Australia) Maddison Inglis
- Score: 6–7^{(5–7)}, 6–1, 6–3

Events
Singles	Doubles
← 2023 ·	Perth Tennis International	· 2025 →

Talia Gibson won the title, defeating Maddison Inglis in the final, 6–7^{(5–7)}, 6–1, 6–3.

Priscilla Hon was the defending champion but chose not to participate.

== Seeds ==
1. (Australia) Talia Gibson (champion)
2. (Australia) Destanee Aiava (semifinals)
3. (Australia) Maddison Inglis (final)
4. (Japan) Aoi Ito (second round)
5. (Japan) Sayaka Ishii (second round)
6. (China) Lu Jiajing (first round)
7. (India) Ankita Raina (first round)
8. (Japan) Kyōka Okamura (second round)

== Draw ==
=== Key ===
- Q = Qualifier
- WC = Wild card
- LL = Lucky loser
- Alt = Alternate
- SE = Special exempt
- PR = Protected ranking
- ITF = ITF entry
- JE = Junior exempt
- w/o = Walkover
- r = Retired
- d = Defaulted
- SR = Special ranking

=== Finals ===
Semifinals
1	(Australia) Talia Gibson	6	6
WC	(Australia) Lizette Cabrera	1	3
3	(Australia) Maddison Inglis	7	6
2	(Australia) Destanee Aiava	5	2

Final
1	(Australia) Talia Gibson	6^{5}	6	6
3	(Australia) Maddison Inglis	7^{7}	1	3

=== Top half ===
First round
1	(Australia) T Gibson	2	7	7^{7}
WC	(Australia) A Bozovic	6	5	6^{5}
WC	(Australia) T Kokkinis	2	4
(Australia) M Ercan	6	6
Q	(Australia) S Webb	2	3
(India) S Bhamidipaty	6	6
(Australia) G Da Silva-Fick	6	6
6	(China) Jia Lu	4	0
4	(Japan) A Ito	7	6
Q	(Japan) A Koshiishi	5	1
WC	(Australia) L Cabrera	6	6
WC	(Australia) A Smith	3	2
(Australia) P Hule	6	6
(Japan) M Kuramochi	4	1
(Japan) S Hosogi	6	5	5
5	(Japan) S Ishii	3	7	7

Second round
1	(Australia) T Gibson	w/o
(Australia) M Ercan
(India) S Bhamidipaty	6	7
(Australia) G Da Silva-Fick	3	5
4	(Japan) A Ito	6^{3}	1
WC	(Australia) L Cabrera	7^{7}	6
(Australia) P Hule	7^{7}	6
5	(Japan) S Ishii	6^{2}	4

Quarterfinals
1	(Australia) T Gibson	6	7
(India) S Bhamidipaty	3	5
WC	(Australia) L Cabrera	6	7^{7}
(Australia) P Hule	3	6^{3}

Semifinals
1	(Australia) T Gibson	6	6
WC	(Australia) L Cabrera	1	3

=== Bottom half ===
First round
7	(India) A Raina	3	2
(Japan) A Shimizu	6	6
Q	(United Kingdom) N Bains	3	6	4
Q	(Japan) C Muramatsu	6	3	6
(Japan) M Matsuda	6	4	6
(Japan) E Shimizu	2	6	4
(Japan) N Sato	1	2
3	(Australia) M Inglis	6	6
8	(Japan) K Okamura	6	6
Q	(Japan) N Arakawa	3	1
(Japan) H Sato	7	6^{9}	1
(Japan) S Imamura	5	7^{11}	6
Q	(Japan) E Sema	6	6^{10}	3
Q	(Australia) E Micic	3	7^{12}	6
Q	(Japan) H Arakawa	1	0
2	(Australia) D Aiava	6	6

Second round
(Japan) A Shimizu	6	6
Q	(Japan) C Muramatsu	1	3
(Japan) M Matsuda	0	3
3	(Australia) M Inglis	6	6
8	(Japan) K Okamura	2	3
(Japan) S Imamura	6	6
Q	(Australia) E Micic	0	0
2	(Australia) D Aiava	6	6

Quarterfinals
(Japan) A Shimizu	4	4
3	(Australia) M Inglis	6	6
(Japan) S Imamura	2	2
2	(Australia) D Aiava	6	6

Semifinals
3	(Australia) M Inglis	7	6
2	(Australia) D Aiava	5	2
