= Perth Tennis International =

- 2024 Perth Tennis International

ITF Women's Tour
- Event name: Perth Tennis International
- Location: Burswood, Perth, Western Australia
- Venue: State Tennis Centre
- Category: ITF Women's World Tennis Tour
- Surface: Hard
- Draw: 32S/32Q/16D
- Prize money: $60,000
- Website: Official website

The Perth Tennis International is a tournament for professional female tennis players played on outdoor hardcourts. It is classified as a $60,000 ITF Women's World Tennis Tour event and has been held in Burswood, Perth, Western Australia, since 2007.

== Past finals ==
=== Singles ===
Year	Champion	Runner-up	Score
2024 (2)	(Australia) Talia Gibson	(Japan) Eri Shimizu	6–2, 6–4
2024 (1)	(Australia) Talia Gibson	(Australia) Maddison Inglis	6–7^{(5–7)}, 6–1, 6–3
2023 (2)	(Australia) Taylah Preston	(Australia) Talia Gibson	7–5, 6–1
2023 (1)	(Australia) Priscilla Hon	(Australia) Talia Gibson	6–1, 3–6, 6–3
2021–22	Tournament cancelled due to the COVID-19 pandemic		
2020 (2)	(Japan) Shiho Akita	(France) Irina Ramialison	6–3, 6–3
2020 (1)	(Australia) Maddison Inglis	(Australia) Destanee Aiava	6–4, 7–6^{(7–4)}
2019	(Switzerland) Lulu Sun	(United States) Jennifer Elie	7–6^{(7–1)}, 6–3
2018 (2)	(United Kingdom) Gabriella Taylor	(France) Myrtille Georges	6–2, 7–5
2018 (1)	(Russia) Irina Khromacheva	(United Kingdom) Katy Dunne	6–2, 6–3
2017 (2)	(Australia) Destanee Aiava	(Slovakia) Viktória Kužmová	6–1, 6–1
2017 (1)	(Czech Republic) Marie Bouzková	(Czech Republic) Markéta Vondroušová	1–6, 6–3, 6–2
2016 (2)	(Australia) Arina Rodionova	(Belarus) Aryna Sabalenka	6–1, 6–1
2016 (1)	(Australia) Jaimee Fourlis	(South Korea) Jang Su-jeong	6–4, 2–6, 7–6^{(7–1)}
2015	not held		
2014	(Sweden) Rebecca Peterson	(Japan) Hiroko Kuwata	6–3, 6–0
2013	(Russia) Arina Rodionova	(United States) Irina Falconi	7–5, 6–4
2009–12	not held		
2008	(Australia) Monika Wejnert	(Japan) Yurika Sema	7–6^{(10–8)}, 7–5
2007	(Australia) Casey Dellacqua	(Japan) Yurika Sema	6–2, 6–1

=== Doubles ===
Year	Champions	Runners-up	Score
2024 (2)	(Japan) Sakura Hosogi (Japan) Misaki Matsuda	(United Kingdom) Naiktha Bains (India) Ankita Raina	walkover
2024 (1)	(Australia) Talia Gibson (Australia) Maddison Inglis	(Japan) Erina Hayashi (Japan) Saki Imamura	6–2, 6–4
2023 (2)	(Australia) Destanee Aiava (Australia) Maddison Inglis	(Australia) Talia Gibson (Australia) Taylah Preston	6–3, 7–6^{(7–3)}
2023 (1)	(Australia) Destanee Aiava (Australia) Maddison Inglis	(Japan) Misaki Matsuda (Japan) Naho Sato	6–1, 6–4
2021–22	Tournament cancelled due to the COVID-19 pandemic		
2020 (2)	(Japan) Kanako Morisaki (Japan) Erika Sema	(New Zealand) Paige Hourigan (Papua New Guinea) Abigail Tere-Apisah	6–1, 4–6, [10–7]
2020 (1)	(Japan) Kanako Morisaki (Japan) Erika Sema	(Australia) Jaimee Fourlis (New Zealand) Erin Routliffe	7–5, 6–4
2019	(United States) Jennifer Elie (France) Irina Ramialison	(Japan) Haine Ogata (Japan) Aiko Yoshitomi	7–5, 6–4
2018 (2)	(Australia) Jessica Moore (Australia) Olivia Tjandramulia	(Australia) Alison Bai (China) Lu Jiajing	7–5, 6–7^{(8–10)}, [11–9]
2018 (1)	(Australia) Jessica Moore (Australia) Ellen Perez	(Australia) Olivia Tjandramulia (Australia) Belinda Woolcock	6–7^{(7–9)}, 6–1, [7–9] ret.
2017 (2)	(Japan) Junri Namigata (Japan) Riko Sawayanagi	(Australia) Tammi Patterson (Australia) Olivia Rogowska	4–6, 7–5, [10–6]
2017 (1)	(Japan) Junri Namigata (Japan) Riko Sawayanagi	(Romania) Irina Bara (India) Prarthana Thombare	7–6^{(7–5)}, 4–6, [11–9]
2016 (2)	(Australia) Tammi Patterson (Poland) Katarzyna Piter	(South Korea) Han Na-lae (South Korea) Jang Su-jeong	4–6, 6–2, [10–3]
2016 (1)	(Australia) Ashleigh Barty (Australia) Jessica Moore	(Australia) Alison Bai (Australia) Abbie Myers	3–6, 6–4, [10–8]
2015	not held		
2014	(Ukraine) Veronika Kapshay (France) Alizé Lim	(Australia) Jessica Moore (Australia) Abbie Myers	6–2, 2–6, [10–7]
2013	(Japan) Erika Sema (Japan) Yurika Sema	(Australia) Monique Adamczak (Australia) Tammi Patterson	7–5, 6–1
2009–12	not held		
2008	(United States) Alexis Prousis (United States) Robin Stephenson	(United Kingdom) Jade Curtis (Chinese Taipei) Hwang I-hsuan	7–6^{(7–5)}, 7–6^{(7–4)}
2007	(Australia) Casey Dellacqua (Australia) Emily Hewson	(Australia) Trudi Musgrave (Australia) Christina Wheeler	6–4, 4–6, 6–2
