= 2024 Australian Open – Women's doubles =

Women's doubles
- 2024 Australian Open

Final
- Champions: (Chinese Taipei) Hsieh Su-wei (Belgium) Elise Mertens
- Runners-up: (Ukraine) Lyudmyla Kichenok (Latvia) Jeļena Ostapenko
- Score: 6–1, 7–5

Details
- Draw: 64
- Seeds: 16

Events
Singles	men	women		boys	girls
Doubles	men	women	mixed	boys	girls
WC Singles	men	women	quad	boys	girls
WC Doubles	men	women	quad	boys	girls
- Australian Open

Hsieh Su-wei and Elise Mertens defeated Lyudmyla Kichenok and Jeļena Ostapenko in the final, 6–1, 7–5 to win the women's doubles tennis title at the 2024 Australian Open. It was their second major title as a team, Hsieh's eighth major title, and Mertens' fourth. With the win, Hsieh claimed both the women's doubles and the mixed doubles titles at the event. Hsieh was the first woman to win both titles at the Australian Open since Rennae Stubbs in 2000, and the first to do so at any major since Martina Hingis at the 2017 US Open. Ostapenko became the first Latvian finalist at the event.

Barbora Krejčíková and Kateřina Siniaková were the two-time defending champions, but chose not to participate together. Krejčíková partnered with Laura Siegemund, but lost to Storm Hunter and Siniaková in the quarterfinals. Hunter and Siniaková lost to Hsieh and Mertens in the semifinals.

Mertens regained the WTA No. 1 doubles ranking by reaching the final. Hunter, Siegemund, Coco Gauff, Jessica Pegula, Gabriela Dabrowski, Taylor Townsend, Nicole Melichar-Martinez and Desirae Krawczyk were also in contention at the start of the tournament.

== Seeds ==
1. (United States) Coco Gauff / (United States) Jessica Pegula (withdrew)
2. (Chinese Taipei) Hsieh Su-wei / (Belgium) Elise Mertens (champions)
3. (Australia) Storm Hunter / (Czech Republic) Kateřina Siniaková (semifinals)
4. (Canada) Gabriela Dabrowski / (New Zealand) Erin Routliffe (semifinals)
5. (Czech Republic) Barbora Krejčíková / (Germany) Laura Siegemund (quarterfinals)
6. (United States) Desirae Krawczyk / (Japan) Ena Shibahara (third round)
7. (United States) Nicole Melichar-Martinez / (Australia) Ellen Perez (first round)
8. (Brazil) Beatriz Haddad Maia / (United States) Taylor Townsend (third round)
9. (Netherlands) Demi Schuurs / (Brazil) Luisa Stefani (quarterfinals)
10. (Chinese Taipei) Chan Hao-ching / (Mexico) Giuliana Olmos (second round)
11. (Ukraine) Lyudmyla Kichenok / (Latvia) Jeļena Ostapenko (final)
12. (Czech Republic) Marie Bouzková / (Spain) Sara Sorribes Tormo (first round)
13. (Japan) Miyu Kato / (Indonesia) Aldila Sutjiadi (first round)
14. (United States) Bethanie Mattek-Sands / (China) Wang Xinyu (first round)
15. (Brazil) Ingrid Martins / (Romania) Monica Niculescu (first round)
16. (Japan) Eri Hozumi / (Japan) Makoto Ninomiya (second round)

Click on the seed number of a player to go to their draw section.

== Draw ==
Key

- Q = Qualifier
- WC = Wild card
- LL = Lucky loser
- Alt = Alternate
- ITF = ITF entry
- PR = Protected ranking
- SR = Special ranking
- SE = Special exempt
- JE = Junior exempt
- JR = Junior Accelerator Programme entrant
- CO = College Accelerator Programme entrant
- NG = Next Gen Accelerator Program entrant
- w/o = Walkover
- r = Retired
- d = Defaulted

=== Finals ===
Quarterfinals
(France) Caroline Garcia (France) Kristina Mladenovic	6^{2}	4
11	(Ukraine) Lyudmyla Kichenok (Latvia) Jeļena Ostapenko	7^{7}	6
4	(Canada) Gabriela Dabrowski (New Zealand) Erin Routliffe	7	6
(Spain) Cristina Bucșa; Alexandra Panova	5	2
5	(Czech Republic) Barbora Krejčíková (Germany) Laura Siegemund	6	5	4
3	(Australia) Storm Hunter (Czech Republic) Kateřina Siniaková	4	7	6
9	(Netherlands) Demi Schuurs (Brazil) Luisa Stefani	4	2
2	(Chinese Taipei) Hsieh Su-wei (Belgium) Elise Mertens	6	6

Semifinals
11	(Ukraine) Lyudmyla Kichenok (Latvia) Jeļena Ostapenko	7	7
4	(Canada) Gabriela Dabrowski (New Zealand) Erin Routliffe	5	5
3	(Australia) Storm Hunter (Czech Republic) Kateřina Siniaková	5	6	3
2	(Chinese Taipei) Hsieh Su-wei (Belgium) Elise Mertens	7	1	6

Final
11	(Ukraine) Lyudmyla Kichenok (Latvia) Jeļena Ostapenko	1	5
2	(Chinese Taipei) Hsieh Su-wei (Belgium) Elise Mertens	6	7

=== Top half ===
==== Section 1 ====
First round
Alt	(Germany) T Korpatsch (France) E Lechemia	7^{7}	6
(France) C Burel (France) D Parry	6^{5}	3
(Poland) K Kawa (Ukraine) M Kostyuk	6	6
(Germany) T Maria (Netherlands) A Rus	0	2
(Hungary) T Babos (Hungary) A Bondár	4	6	7
PR	(Italy) A Moratelli (United Kingdom) S Murray Sharan	6	1	5
(France) C Garcia (France) K Mladenovic	4	7^{8}	6
14	(United States) B Mattek-Sands (China) Xin Wang	6	6^{6}	2
11	(Ukraine) L Kichenok (Latvia) J Ostapenko	6	7^{7}
Alt	(United States) E Bektas (United States) K Day	4	6^{3}
(France) V Gracheva (United States) S Santamaria	0	3
WC	(Australia) K Birrell (Australia) O Gadecki	6	6
(Czech Republic) L Nosková (China) Xiy Wang	3	6	6
WC	(Australia) T Gibson (Australia) P Hon	6	3	4
(Chinese Taipei) F-h Wu (China) L Zhu	3	6	7^{10}
7	(United States) N Melichar-Martinez (Australia) E Perez	6	3	6^{5}

Second round
Alt	(Germany) T Korpatsch (France) E Lechemia	w/o
(Poland) K Kawa (Ukraine) M Kostyuk
(Hungary) T Babos (Hungary) A Bondár	4	2
(France) C Garcia (France) K Mladenovic	6	6
11	(Ukraine) L Kichenok (Latvia) J Ostapenko	3	7^{10}	6
WC	(Australia) K Birrell (Australia) O Gadecki	6	6^{8}	3
(Czech Republic) L Nosková (China) Xiy Wang	4	2
(Chinese Taipei) F-h Wu (China) L Zhu	6	6

Third round
Alt	(Germany) T Korpatsch (France) E Lechemia	6	5	0
(France) C Garcia (France) K Mladenovic	3	7	6
11	(Ukraine) L Kichenok (Latvia) J Ostapenko	6	7
(Chinese Taipei) F-h Wu (China) L Zhu	3	5

Quarterfinals
(France) C Garcia (France) K Mladenovic	6^{2}	4
11	(Ukraine) L Kichenok (Latvia) J Ostapenko	7^{7}	6

==== Section 2 ====
First round
4	(Canada) G Dabrowski (New Zealand) E Routliffe	6	7
Alt	(Czech Republic) L Fruhvirtová (United States) A Krueger	1	5
A Potapova; Y Sizikova	6	2	2
V Kudermetova; A Pavlyuchenkova	2	6	6
(Netherlands) B Schoofs (Belgium) K Zimmermann	7^{7}	4	1
(China) H Guo (China) X Jiang	6^{5}	6	6
(United States) S Chang (United States) A Parks	6	5	6^{5}
16	(Japan) E Hozumi (Japan) M Ninomiya	4	7	7^{10}
12	(Czech Republic) M Bouzková (Spain) S Sorribes Tormo	2	6	4
(Spain) C Bucșa; A Panova	6	2	6
E Avanesyan; I Shymanovich	2	6	6
(United States) D Collins (Ukraine) N Kichenok	6	4	1
M Andreeva (Bulgaria) V Tomova	4	0
A Blinkova; A Sasnovich	6	6
(Slovakia) T Mihalíková (China) Y Xu	5	2
8	(Brazil) B Haddad Maia (United States) T Townsend	7	6

Second round
4	(Canada) G Dabrowski (New Zealand) E Routliffe	w/o
V Kudermetova; A Pavlyuchenkova
(China) H Guo (China) X Jiang	6	6
16	(Japan) E Hozumi (Japan) M Ninomiya	3	2
(Spain) C Bucșa; A Panova	6	6
E Avanesyan; I Shymanovich	1	2
A Blinkova; A Sasnovich	6^{2}	4
8	(Brazil) B Haddad Maia (United States) T Townsend	7^{7}	6

Third round
4	(Canada) G Dabrowski (New Zealand) E Routliffe	4	6	6
(China) H Guo (China) X Jiang	6	1	3
(Spain) C Bucșa; A Panova	6	6
8	(Brazil) B Haddad Maia (United States) T Townsend	2	4

Quarterfinals
4	(Canada) G Dabrowski (New Zealand) E Routliffe	7	6
(Spain) C Bucșa; A Panova	5	2

=== Bottom half ===
==== Section 3 ====
First round
5	(Czech Republic) B Krejčíková (Germany) L Siegemund	6	6
(United Kingdom) K Boulter (Croatia) P Martić	2	1
(Italy) L Bronzetti (United Kingdom) H Watson	3	3
WC	(China) Y Wang (China) Y Yuan	6	6
(Ukraine) A Kalinina (Slovakia) AK Schmiedlová	5	0
(United States) E Navarro; D Shnaider	7	6
(United States) S Kenin (United States) A Muhammad	7^{7}	3	5
10	(Chinese Taipei) H-c Chan (Mexico) G Olmos	6^{5}	6	7
13	(Japan) M Kato (Indonesia) A Sutjiadi	3	6	5
E Alexandrova; A Kalinskaya	6	0	7
WC	(Australia) K McPhee (Australia) A Sharma	6^{4}	6^{0}
WC	(Australia) T Preston (Australia) Ar Rodionova	7^{7}	7^{7}
(Italy) E Cocciaretto (Italy) M Trevisan	6	1	2
WC	(Australia) D Aiava (Australia) M Inglis	1	6	6
(Colombia) C Osorio (Kazakhstan) Y Putintseva	5	5
3	(Australia) S Hunter (Czech Republic) K Siniaková	7	7

Second round
5	(Czech Republic) B Krejčíková (Germany) L Siegemund	6	6
WC	(China) Y Wang (China) Y Yuan	2	4
(United States) E Navarro; D Shnaider	6	4	6
10	(Chinese Taipei) H-c Chan (Mexico) G Olmos	3	6	1
E Alexandrova; A Kalinskaya	6	6
WC	(Australia) T Preston (Australia) Ar Rodionova	2	3
WC	(Australia) D Aiava (Australia) M Inglis	6	5	1
3	(Australia) S Hunter (Czech Republic) K Siniaková	2	7	6

Third round
5	(Czech Republic) B Krejčíková (Germany) L Siegemund	6	6
(United States) E Navarro; D Shnaider	4	0
E Alexandrova; A Kalinskaya	2	2
3	(Australia) S Hunter (Czech Republic) K Siniaková	6	6

Quarterfinals
5	(Czech Republic) B Krejčíková (Germany) L Siegemund	6	5	4
3	(Australia) S Hunter (Czech Republic) K Siniaková	4	7	6

==== Section 4 ====
First round
6	(United States) D Krawczyk (Japan) E Shibahara	6	6
I Khromacheva (Czech Republic) M Kolodziejová	1	4
(Romania) A Bogdan (Spain) R Masarova	6	6
PR	(Norway) U Eikeri (United States) C Harrison	4	4
(Kazakhstan) A Danilina (Slovakia) V Hrunčáková	7^{7}	4	4
(United States) C Dolehide (United States) P Stearns	6^{3}	6	6
(Romania) S Cîrstea (Croatia) D Vekić	2	5
9	(Netherlands) D Schuurs (Brazil) L Stefani	6	7
15	(Brazil) I Martins (Romania) M Niculescu	3	1
(Italy) S Errani (Italy) J Paolini	6	6
L Marozava (Poland) K Piter	1	1
PR	(Japan) S Aoyama (Serbia) A Krunić	6	6
WC	(Australia) D Saville (Australia) A Tomljanović	6	6
(Georgia (country)) O Kalashnikova (United Kingdom) M Lumsden	4	3
(Belgium) G Minnen (Belgium) Y Wickmayer	2	1
2	(Chinese Taipei) S-w Hsieh (Belgium) E Mertens	6	6

Second round
6	(United States) D Krawczyk (Japan) E Shibahara	6	6
(Romania) A Bogdan (Spain) R Masarova	3	1
(United States) C Dolehide (United States) P Stearns	6^{6}	6	5
9	(Netherlands) D Schuurs (Brazil) L Stefani	7^{8}	4	7
(Italy) S Errani (Italy) J Paolini	6	7
PR	(Japan) S Aoyama (Serbia) A Krunić	1	5
WC	(Australia) D Saville (Australia) A Tomljanović	1	1
2	(Chinese Taipei) S-w Hsieh (Belgium) E Mertens	6	6

Third round
6	(United States) D Krawczyk (Japan) E Shibahara	5	6	6^{6}
9	(Netherlands) D Schuurs (Brazil) L Stefani	7	2	7^{10}
(Italy) S Errani (Italy) J Paolini	6	3	5
2	(Chinese Taipei) S-w Hsieh (Belgium) E Mertens	3	6	7

Quarterfinals
9	(Netherlands) D Schuurs (Brazil) L Stefani	4	2
2	(Chinese Taipei) S-w Hsieh (Belgium) E Mertens	6	6

== Seeded teams ==
The following are the seeded teams, based on WTA rankings as of 8 January 2024.

Country	Player	Country	Player	Rank	Seed
~~USA~~	~~Coco Gauff~~	~~USA~~	~~Jessica Pegula~~	~~6~~	~~1~~
TPE	Hsieh Su-wei	BEL	Elise Mertens	8	2
AUS	Storm Hunter	CZE	Kateřina Siniaková	14	3
CAN	Gabriela Dabrowski	NZL	Erin Routliffe	16	4
CZE	Barbora Krejčiková	GER	Laura Siegemund	17	5
USA	Desirae Krawczyk	JPN	Ena Shibahara	30	6
USA	Nicole Melichar-Martinez	AUS	Ellen Perez	32	7
BRA	Beatriz Haddad Maia	USA	Taylor Townsend	35	8
NED	Demi Schuurs	BRA	Luisa Stefani	37	9
TPE	Chan Hao-ching	MEX	Giuliana Olmos	44	10
UKR	Lyudmyla Kichenok	LAT	Jeļena Ostapenko	54	11
CZE	Marie Bouzková	ESP	Sara Sorribes Tormo	56	12
JPN	Miyu Kato	INA	Aldila Sutjiadi	56	13
USA	Bethanie Mattek-Sands	CHN	Wang Xinyu	79	14
BRA	Ingrid Martins	ROU	Monica Niculescu	89	15
JPN	Eri Hozumi	JPN	Makoto Ninomiya	98	16

== Other entry information ==
=== Wild cards ===
- (Australia) Destanee Aiava / (Australia) Maddison Inglis
- (Australia) Kimberly Birrell / (Australia) Olivia Gadecki
- (Australia) Talia Gibson / (Australia) Priscilla Hon
- (Australia) Kaylah McPhee / (Australia) Astra Sharma
- (Australia) Taylah Preston / (Australia) Arina Rodionova
- (Australia) Daria Saville / (Australia) Ajla Tomljanović
- (China) Wang Yafan / (China) Yuan Yue

=== Protected ranking ===
- (Japan) Shuko Aoyama / (Serbia) Aleksandra Krunić
- (Norway) Ulrikke Eikeri / (United States) Catherine Harrison
- (Italy) Angelica Moratelli / (United Kingdom) Samantha Murray Sharan

=== Alternates ===
- (United States) Emina Bektas / (United States) Kayla Day
- (Czech Republic) Linda Fruhvirtová / (United States) Ashlyn Krueger
- (Germany) Tamara Korpatsch / (France) Elixane Lechemia

=== Withdrawals ===
- (United States) Coco Gauff / (United States) Jessica Pegula → replaced by (Germany) Tamara Korpatsch / (France) Elixane Lechemia
- (Ukraine) Marta Kostyuk / (Romania) Elena-Gabriela Ruse → replaced by (Poland) Katarzyna Kawa / (Ukraine) Marta Kostyuk
- (Poland) Magda Linette / (United States) Bernarda Pera → replaced by (United States) Emina Bektas / (United States) Kayla Day
- (Argentina) Nadia Podoroska / (Egypt) Mayar Sherif → replaced by (Czech Republic) Linda Fruhvirtová / (United States) Ashlyn Krueger
