= Maddison Inglis =

Australian tennis player (born 1998)

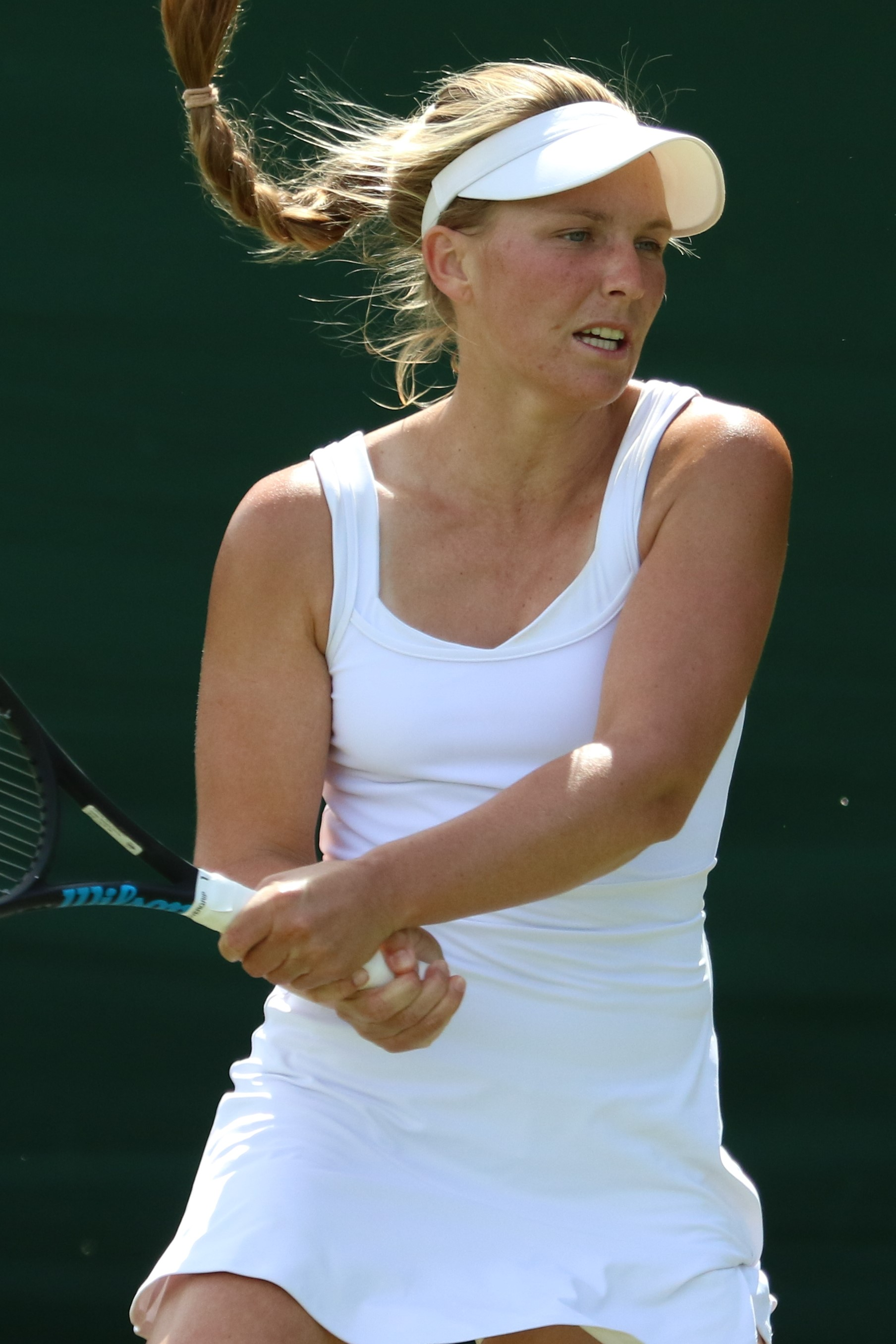
- Inglis at the 2022 Wimbledon Championships
- Country (sports): Australia
- Residence: Gold Coast, Queensland, Australia
- Born: 14 January 1998 (age 28) Perth, Western Australia, Australia
- Height: 1.71 m (5 ft 7 in)
- Plays: Right (two-handed backhand)
- Prize money: $1,948,140

Singles
- Career record: 320–230
- Career titles: 9 ITF
- Highest ranking: No. 112 (2 March 2020)
- Current ranking: No. 140 (28 September 2026)

Grand Slam singles results
- Australian Open: 4R (2026)
- French Open: 1R (2020)
- Wimbledon: 1R (2022)
- US Open: 1R (2020)

Doubles
- Career record: 101–88
- Career titles: 8 ITF
- Highest ranking: No. 158 (16 September 2024)
- Current ranking: No. 371 (28 September 2026)

Grand Slam doubles results
- Australian Open: 2R (2020, 2021, 2024)

Grand Slam mixed doubles results
- Australian Open: QF (2023)
- Last updated on: 28 September 2026.

Maddison Inglis (born 14 January 1998) is an Australian tennis player. She has a career-high singles ranking of world No. 112, achieved on 2 March 2020. Inglis has won nine titles in singles and eight in doubles on the ITF Women's Circuit.

== Personal life ==
Inglis was born and raised in Perth, Western Australia where she attended Sacred Heart College in Thornlie during her childhood.

Her parents first met on a tennis court in country Victoria before deciding to move to Western Australia to start a family. Inglis began playing tennis at the age of four at the Kalamunda Tennis Club in the Perth Hills.

In January 2019, at 20 years of age, she relocated to Queensland to work with coach Chris Mahony and train with higher level professionals such as Kim Birrell, Priscilla Hon and Lizette Cabrera at the Tennis Australia's National Academy (Brisbane).

Inglis is engaged to fellow professional tennis player Jason Kubler and the couple live together on the Gold Coast. The pair got engaged on Rottnest Island in December 2025.

== Career ==
=== 2015–2016: Major debut ===
Inglis made her major main-draw debut at the 2015 Australian Open in the doubles event, partnering Alexandra Nancarrow.

She was awarded a wildcard into the 2016 Australian Open, after having won the Wildcard Playoff defeating Arina Rodionova in the final, in straight sets. However, she lost in round one to 21st-seeded Ekaterina Makarova.

=== 2020–2022: Australian Open third round ===
Inglis won the 2020 Burnie International, increasing her ranking to a career-high of world No. 116.

As a qualifier, she made her first major third round at the 2022 Australian Open, defeating 23rd seed Leylah Fernandez and Hailey Baptiste, before losing to Kaia Kanepi. Inglis qualified into the main-draw at the 2022 Wimbledon Championships making her debut at this major. She fell in the first round to Dalma Gálfi, in three sets.

=== 2023–2024: United Cup debut, loss of form ===
Inglis was selected as a member of the inaugural 2023 United Cup team representing Australia, and was a late substitution for the ailing Australian number one, Ajla Tomljanovic, but lost to Harriet Dart and Nuria Párrizas Díaz. Inglis fell in the first round of qualifying at the 2023 Australian Open to Kristina Mladenovic.

She reached the third round of qualifying at the 2024 Australian Open, before losing to Daria Snigur. At the same tournament, she reached the second round in doubles with Destanee Aiava. Inglis also reached the third round of qualifying at Wimbledon but failed at the first qualifying hurdle at the US Open to Alexandra Eala.

=== 2025–2026: Major fourth round, WTA doubles final ===
Inglis reached the final round of qualifying at the 2025 Australian Open, at which point she lost to Julia Riera, in three sets.

In March 2025, Inglis qualified to make her WTA 1000 debut at Indian Wells, but lost to Sofia Kenin in the first round. Inglis also qualified for the 2025 Cincinnati Open, only to once again bow out in the first round, this time to wildcard entrant Caty McNally.

She was selected as a member of the Australian 2026 United Cup team but did not play. Ranked No. 168 at the 2026 Australian Open, she reached the third round as a qualifier for a second time at her home major, with wins over Kimberly Birrell and Laura Siegemund. Next, Inglis reached the fourth round of a major event for the first time when Naomi Osaka withdrew. Her run was ended by world No. 2, Iga Świątek.

In August 2026, Inglis made it through to her first WTA 125 singles final at the Vancouver Open, losing to fellow Australian player Taylah Preston, in straight sets. Two months later she qualified for the China Open and defeated Zeynep Sönmez for her first main-draw win at WTA 1000 level, before losing to 20th seed Sára Bejlek in the second round.

Partnering with Talia Gibson, Inglis reached her first WTA Tour doubles final at the 2026 Hong Kong Open, losing to second seeds Chan Hao-ching and Miyu Kato in straight sets.

== Performance timelines ==
Key
W	F	SF	QF	#R	RR	Q#	DNQ	A	NH

(W) winner; (F) finalist; (SF) semifinalist; (QF) quarterfinalist; (#R) rounds 4, 3, 2, 1; (RR) round-robin stage; (Q#) qualification round; (DNQ) did not qualify; (A) absent; (NH) not held; (SR) strike rate (events won / competed); (W–L) win–loss record.
To avoid confusion and double counting, these charts are updated at the conclusion of a tournament or when the player's participation has ended.

Only main-draw results in WTA Tour, Grand Slam tournaments, Fed Cup/Billie Jean King Cup and Olympic Games are included in win–loss records.

=== Singles ===
Current through the 2026 Australian Open.

Tournament	2016	2017	2018	2019	2020	2021	2022	2023	2024	2025	2026	SR	W–L	Win%
Grand Slam tournaments
Australian Open	1R	A	A	Q1	Q2	1R	3R	Q1	Q3	Q3	4R (Note: Inglis received a walkover in the third-round match of the 2026 Australian Open, which does not count as a win.)	0 / 4	4–4	50%
French Open	A	A	A	A	1R	A	Q1	A	A	Q2	Q1	0 / 1	0–1	0%
Wimbledon	A	A	A	A	NH	Q2	1R	A	Q3	Q1	Q1	0 / 1	0–1	0%
US Open	A	A	A	Q2	1R	Q1	Q3	A	Q1	Q2	Q1	0 / 1	0–1	0%
Win–loss	0–1	0–0	0–0	0–0	0–2	0–1	2–2	0–0	0–0	0–0	2–1	0 / 7	4–7	36%
WTA 1000
Qatar Open (Note: The first Premier 5 event of the year has switched back and forth between the Dubai Tennis Championships and the Qatar Ladies Open since 2009 until 2024. Dubai was classified as a Premier 5 event from 2009 to 2011 before being succeeded by Doha for the 2012–2014 period. In 2015, Dubai regained its Premier 5 status while Doha was demoted to Premier status. The Premier 5 tournaments were reclassified as WTA 1000 tournaments in 2021.)	A	A	A	A	A	A	Q1	A	A	A	A	0 / 0	0–0	–
Dubai	A	A	A	A	A	A	A	A	A	A	A	0 / 0	0–0	–
Indian Wells	A	A	A	A	NH	Q2	Q1	A	A	1R	Q1	0 / 1	0–1	0%
Miami Open	A	A	A	A	NH	A	Q1	A	A	Q1	Q1	0 / 0	0–0	–
Madrid Open	A	A	A	A	NH	A	Q1	A	A	A	A	0 / 0	0–0	–
Italian Open	A	A	A	A	NH	A	A	A	A	A	A	0 / 0	0–0	–
Canadian Open	A	A	A	A	NH	Q2	A	A	A	A	A	0 / 0	0–0	–
Cincinnati Open	A	A	A	A	NH	A	A	A	A	1R	A	0 / 1	0–1	0%
Wuhan Open	A	A	A	A	NH				A	A		0 / 0	0–0	–
China Open	A	A	A	A	NH			A	A	1R		0 / 1	0–1	0%
Career statistics
Tournaments	2	0	0	0	2	8	5	0	0	6	1	Career total: 24		
Overall win–loss	0–2	0–0	0–0	0–0	0–2	4–8	3–5	0–2	0–0	0–6	2–1	0 / 24	9–26	26%
Year-end ranking	538	771	134	134	129	136	177	277	161	175		$1,818,401		

=== Doubles ===
Tournament	2020	2021	2022	2023	2024	2025	2026	SR	W–L
Australian Open	2R	2R	1R	A	2R	1R	1R	0 / 6	3–6
French Open	A	A	A	A	A	A	A	0 / 0	0–0
Wimbledon	NH	A	A	A	A	A	A	0 / 0	0–0
US Open	A	A	A	A	A	A	A	0 / 0	0–0
Win–loss	1–1	1–1	0–1	0–0	1–1	0–1	0–1	0 / 6	3–6

== WTA Tour finals ==
=== Doubles: 1 (runner-up) ===
Legend WTA 250 (0–1)	Finals by surface Hard (0–1)

Result	W–L	Date	Tournament	Tier	Surface	Partner	Opponents	Score
Loss	0–1	Nov 2026	Hong Kong Open, China	WTA 250	Hard	(Australia) Talia Gibson	(Chinese Taipei) Chan Hao-ching (Japan) Miyu Kato	4–6, 4–6

== WTA 125 finals ==
=== Singles: 1 (runner-up) ===
Result	W–L	Date	Tournament	Surface	Opponent	Score
Loss	0–1	Aug 2026	Vancouver Open, Canada	Hard	(Australia) Taylah Preston	6–7^{(5–7)}, 3–6

== ITF Circuit finals ==
=== Singles: 19 (9 titles, 10 runner-ups) ===
Legend W100 tournaments (1–0) W60/75 tournaments (2–5) W25/35 tournaments (6–5)	Finals by surface Hard (8–9) Grass (1–1)

Result	W–L	Date	Tournament	Tier	Surface	Opponent	Score
Loss	0–1	Apr 2019	ITF Hong Kong, China	W25	Hard	(China) Ma Shuyue	6–4, 3–6, 2–6
Win	1–1	May 2019	ITF Nonthaburi, Thailand	W25	Hard	(Thailand) Peangtarn Plipuech	6–0, 6–2
Win	2–1	Jul 2019	ITF Saskatoon, Canada	W25	Hard	(Canada) Katherine Sebov	6–4, 2–6, 6–4
Loss	2–2	Oct 2019	Brisbane QTC International, Australia	W25	Hard	(United States) Asia Muhammad	3–6, 6–3, 3–6
Win	3–2	Oct 2019	ITF Toowoomba, Australia	W25	Hard	(Japan) Kyoka Okamura	6–1, 4–6, 6–0
Loss	3–3	Oct 2019	Bendigo International, Australia	W60	Hard	(Australia) Lizette Cabrera	2–6, 3–6
Win	4–3	Jan 2020	Burnie International, Australia	W60	Hard	(United States) Sachia Vickery	2–6, 6–3, 7–5
Win	5–3	Feb 2020	ITF Perth, Western Australia	W25	Hard	(Australia) Destanee Aiava	6–4, 7–6^{(4)}
Loss	5–4	Oct 2022	Playford International, Australia	W60	Hard	(Australia) Kimberly Birrell	6–3, 5–7, 4–6
Loss	5–5	Feb 2023	ITF Swan Hill, Australia	W25	Grass	(Australia) Arina Rodionova	4–6, 3–6
Win	6–5	Apr 2023	ITF Osaka, Japan	W25	Hard	(South Korea) Han Na-lae	6–3, 7–6^{(2)}
Loss	6–6	May 2023	ITF Monzón, Spain	W25	Hard	(Czech Republic) Gabriela Knutson	4–6, 2–6
Win	7–6	Mar 2024	ITF Mildura, Australia	W35	Grass	(Australia) Tina Nadine Smith	6–4, 6–1
Win	8–6	Apr 2024	Tokyo Open, Japan	W100	Hard	(Japan) Ena Shibahara	6–4, 3–6, 6–2
Loss	8–7	Sep 2024	Perth International, Australia	W75	Hard	(Australia) Talia Gibson	7–6^{(5)}, 1–6, 3–6
Loss	8–8	Oct 2024	ITF Cairns, Australia	W35	Hard	(Australia) Destanee Aiava	2–6, 6–4, 5–7
Win	9–8	Oct 2024	Playford International, Australia	W75	Hard	(Japan) Himeno Sakatsume	7–6^{(7)}, 5–7, 6–1
Loss	9–9	Feb 2025	Brisbane QTC International 2, Australia	W75	Hard	(Australia) Kimberly Birrell	2–6, 6–4, 6–7^{(2)}
Loss	9–10	Nov 2025	Playford International, Australia	W75	Hard	(Australia) Emerson Jones	4–6, 4–6

=== Doubles: 14 (8 titles, 6 runner-ups) ===
Legend W60/75 tournaments (3–2) W50 tournaments (1–0) W25 tournaments (4–4)	Finals by surface Hard (8–6)

Result	W–L	Date	Tournament	Tier	Surface	Partner	Opponents	Score
Loss	0–1	May 2016	ITF Goyang, South Korea	W25	Hard	(Russia) Anastasia Gasanova	(United Kingdom) Freya Christie (United Kingdom) Harriet Dart	3–6, 2–6
Win	1–1	Oct 2018	Brisbane QTC International, Australia	W25	Hard	(Australia) Kaylah McPhee	(India) Rutuja Bhosale (China) Xu Shilin	7–5, 6–4
Loss	1–2	Apr 2019	ITF Hong Kong, China	W25	Hard (i) (Note: This tournament is an outdoor event, but rain caused the doubles final to be postponed from 13 April and then transferred to an indoor court.)	(Australia) Kaylah McPhee	(New Zealand) Paige Hourigan (Indonesia) Aldila Sutjiadi	3–6, 1–6
Loss	1–3	Sep 2019	ITF Cairns, Australia	W25	Hard	(United States) Asia Muhammad	(New Zealand) Emily Fanning (Australia) Abbie Myers	6–2, 6–7^{(2)}, [7–10]
Win	2–3	Oct 2019	Bendigo International, Australia	W60	Hard	(Australia) Kaylah McPhee	(United Kingdom) Naiktha Bains (Slovakia) Tereza Mihalikova	3–6, 6–2, [10–2]
Win	3–3	Sep 2022	ITF Santarém, Portugal	W25	Hard	(Japan) Mai Hontama	(Netherlands) Suzan Lamens; Anastasia Tikhonova	6–0, 6–4
Win	4–3	Sep 2023	ITF Perth, Australia	W25	Hard	(Australia) Destanee Aiava	(Japan) Misaki Matsuda (Japan) Naho Sato	6–1, 6–4
Win	5–3	Sep 2023	ITF Perth, Australia	W25	Hard	(Australia) Destanee Aiava	(Australia) Talia Gibson (Australia) Taylah Preston	6–3, 7–6^{(3)}
Loss	5–4	Oct 2023	ITF Cairns Australia	W25	Hard	(Australia) Lizette Cabrera	(Japan) Yuki Naito (Japan) Naho Sato	6–4, 3–6, [2–10]
Win	6–4	Oct 2023	Sydney Open, Australia	W60	Hard	(Australia) Destanee Aiava	(Japan) Kyōka Okamura (Japan) Ayano Shimizu	6–0, 6–0
Loss	6–5	Nov 2023	Brisbane QTC International, Australia	W60	Hard	(Australia) Destanee Aiava	(Australia) Talia Gibson (Australia) Priscilla Hon	6–4, 5–7, [5–10]
Win	7–5	Sep 2024	Perth International, Australia	W75	Hard	(Australia) Talia Gibson	(Japan) Erina Hayashi (Japan) Saki Imamura	6–2, 6–4
Loss	7–6	Oct 2024	Sydney Open, Australia	W75	Hard	(Australia) Destanee Aiava	(Australia) Lizette Cabrera (Australia) Taylah Preston	1–6, 6–3, [8–10]
Win	8–6	Nov 2024	Brisbane QTC International, Australia	W50	Hard	(Australia) Destanee Aiava	(Japan) Yuki Naito (India) Ankita Raina	6–3, 6–4
