= List of Australia Fed Cup team representatives =

Since the initiation of the Fed Cup tournament 1963, 44 tennis players have represented the Australia Fed Cup team in ties. A Fed Cup tie is a contest involving four singles tennis matches and one doubles match in World Group and World Group II competitions from 1995 onwards, and two singles and one doubles matches elsewhere, competed between two Class B members of the ITF. Fed Cup differs from Davis Cup in that ties are played over two days rather than three, that the doubles match is played fifth rather than third, that matches are always best-of-three, and that zonal competition ties never have more than three matches.

Tennis Australia has existed since 1904, but the sport itself has remained popular in Australia since the nineteenth century, mainly because the country's climate is recognised as being desirable for outdoor sports. As a result, Australian tennis grew to a point where it is often considered to be one of the most dominant in the world, highlighted by seventeen Fed Cup final appearances with seven wins, and the emergence of celebrated players such as multi Grand Slam titlists and former World No. 1s Margaret Court and Evonne Goolagong. However, since the 1980s the performance of Australian women's singles tennis has fallen considerably. While many players such as Rennae Stubbs and Samantha Stosur enjoyed great success in doubles, no women appeared in the top 20 singles rankings between Elizabeth Smylie in 1987 and Alicia Molik in 2004, and the Fed Cup team was relegated to Zonal Competition for the first time since 1963 in 2004. The decline continued in 2008, when the Australians were unable to even qualify for the Fed Cup zonal competition final, and there were no Australian women in the Year-End Top 50. However, recently there has been a resurgence for Australian tennis, with the Fed Cup team returning to the World Group in 2011 and 2013, and Stosur becoming a consistent top ten singles player and becoming the first Australian woman since 1980 to win a Grand Slam title at the 2011 US Open. Young Australian tennis players such as 2012 Fed Cup debutant Olivia Rogowska and Ashleigh Barty are also considered to make future rises in the rankings.

The Australian team is one of four nations to compete in every edition of the Fed Cup since its initiation; Margaret Court (then known as Margaret Smith), Jan O'Neill and Lesley Turner partook in the first competition. Wendy Turnbull has partaken in the most ties, and has also achieved the most doubles wins and most total wins for an Australian in Fed Cup. Dianne Balestrat, however, holds the record for the most singles wins, though she will be overtaken if active player Samantha Stosur accumulates two more wins to her Fed Cup record.

This list includes all players who have played at least one Fed Cup tie and is initially arranged in alphabetical order according to surname.

== Key ==
- DOB – Date of birth
- First – Year of debut
- Last – Year of latest game
- Ties – Number of ties played
- Sin – singles matches
- Dou – doubles matches
- Tot – total matches

== Fed Cup players ==
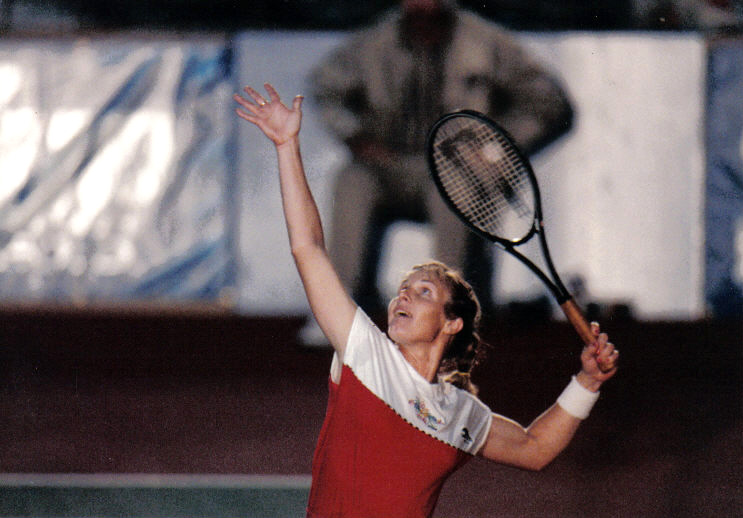
Dianne Balestrat

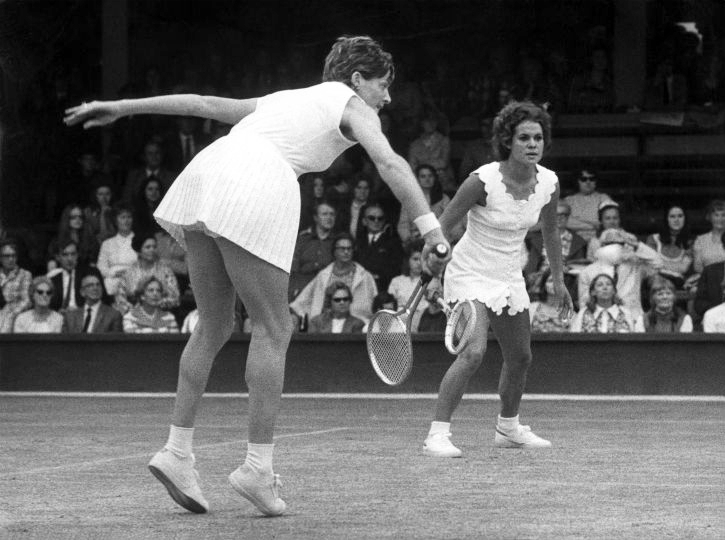
Margaret Court (left) and Evonne Goolagong Cawley (right)

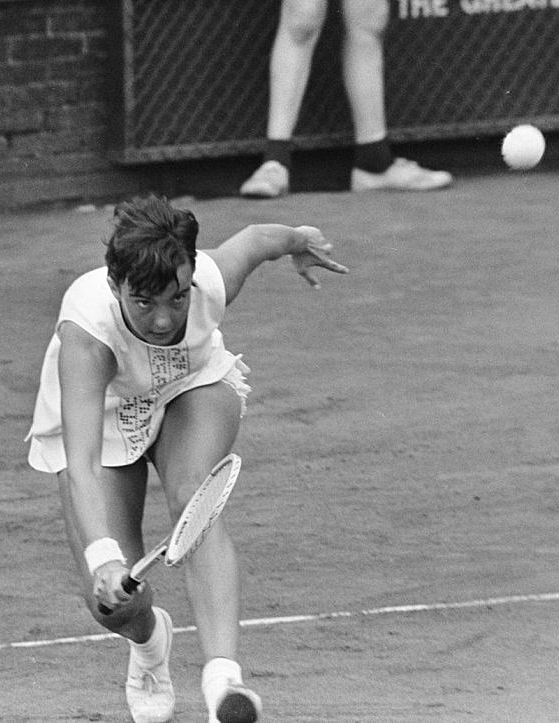
Kerry Melville Reid

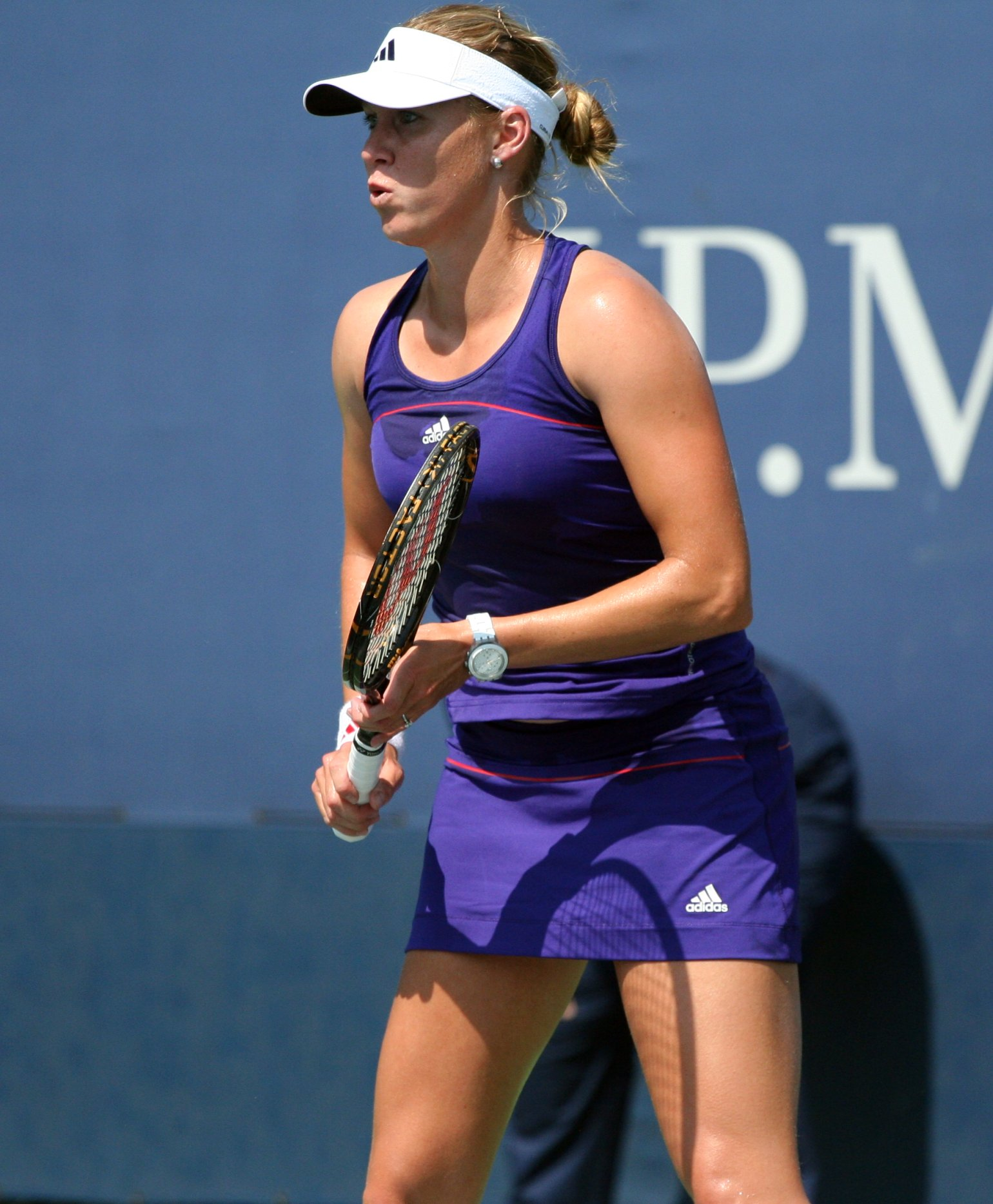
Alicia Molik

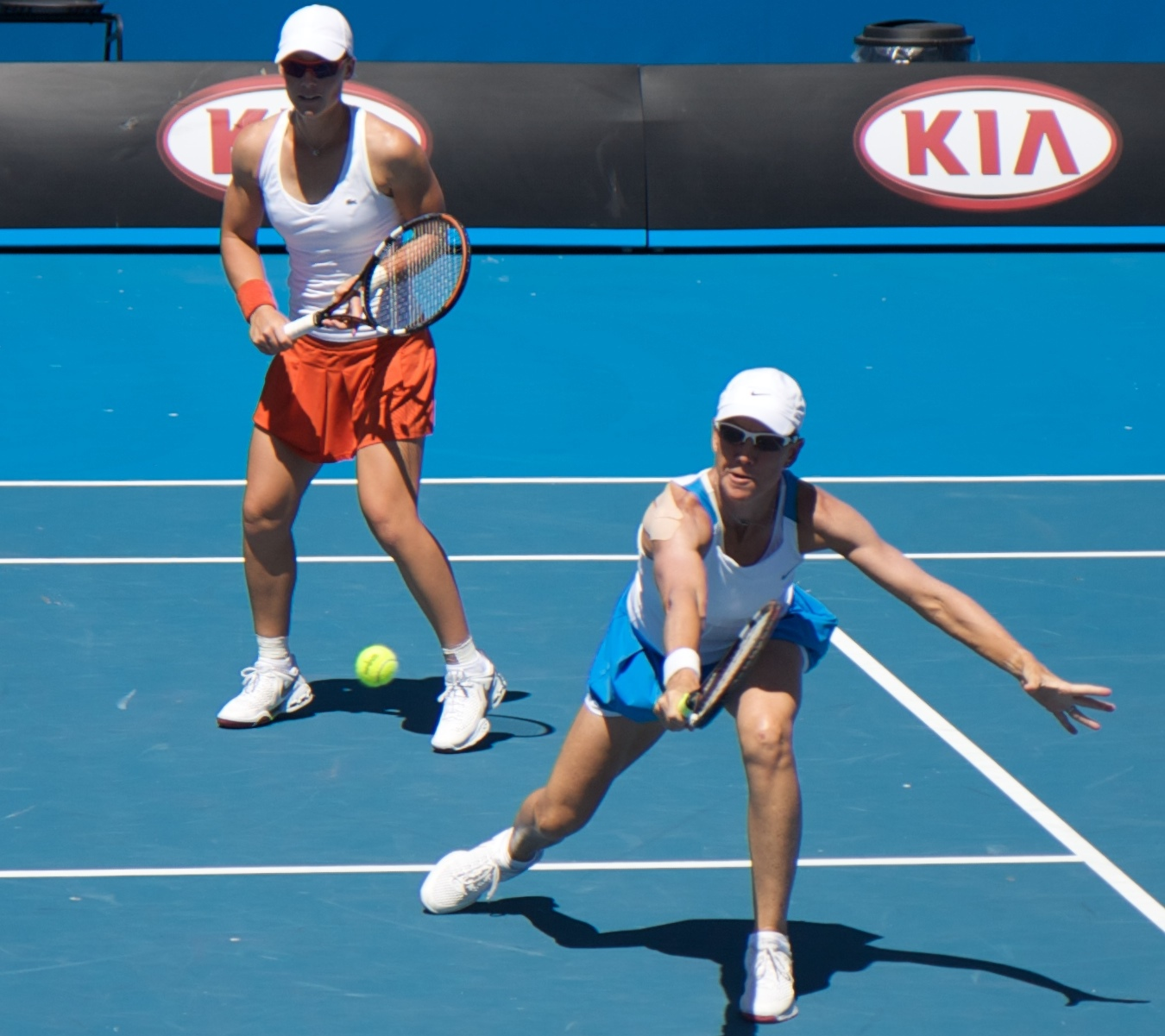
Samantha Stosur (left) and Rennae Stubbs (right)

Name	DOB	First	Last	Ties	Win/Loss		
Name	DOB	First	Last	Ties	Sin	Dou	Tot
Destanee Aiava	10 May 2000	2018	2018	1	0–0	1–0	1–0
Dianne Balestrat	10 August 1956	1974	1983	37	24–9	11–2	35–11
Catherine Barclay	12 June 1973	1999	1999	3	3–0	0–0	3–0
Gail Benedetti	3 April 1945	1966	1966	2	1–1	0–0	1–1
Ashleigh Barty	24 April 1996	2013	2019	11	11–3	7–2	18–5
Kimberly Birrell	29 April 1998	2016	2025	9	3–5	1–0	4–5
Nicole Bradtke	22 September 1969	1988	1996	17	12–8	6–1	18–9
Jenny Byrne	25 February 1967	1985	1992	6	0–0	5–1	5–1
Patricia Coleman	13 May 1953	1973	1973	4	4–0	0–0	4–0
Margaret Court	16 June 1942	1963	1971	20	20–0	15–5	35–5
Casey Dellacqua	11 February 1985	2006	2018	21	6–5	13–4	19–9
Jelena Dokic	12 April 1983	1998	2012	14	13–2	1–1	14–3
Evie Dominikovic	29 May 1980	2001	2005	7	2–3	3–1	5–4
Robyn Ebbern	2 June 1944	1964	1964	1	1–0	0–0	1–0
Annabel Ellwood	2 February 1978	1997	1998	3	2–2	1–0	3–2
Sophie Ferguson	19 March 1986	2005	2005	2	1–0	0–1	1–1
Olivia Gadecki	24 April 2002	2021	2021	1	0–0	0–1	0–1
Jarmila Gajdošová	26 April 1987	2011	2015	8	6–7	0–2	6–9
Daria Gavrilova	5 March 1994	2016	2024	9	5–7	2–1	7–8
Kristin Godridge	7 February 1973	1990	1991	2	0–0	1–1	1–1
Evonne Goolagong Cawley	31 July 1951	1970	1982	26	22–3	13–2	35–5
Helen Gourlay Cawley	23 December 1946	1972	1975	8	3–3	3–2	6–5
Kerry-Anne Guse	4 December 1972	1997	1998	4	1–1	2–1	3–2
Priscilla Hon	10 May 1998	2019	2019	1	0–0	1–0	1–0
Lesley Hunt	29 May 1950	1970	1972	2	1–0	1–0	2–0
Michelle Jaggard-Lai	6 May 1969	1993	1993	4	2–2	0–0	2–2
Maya Joint	16 April 2006	2025	2025	4	3–1	0–0	3–1
Karen Krantzcke	1 February 1947	1966	1970	7	4–1	7–0	11–1
Kristine Kunce	3 March 1970	1994	1997	4	0–2	1–1	1–3
Susan Leo	10 August 1962	1980	1983	13	2–0	9–3	11–3
Rachel McQuillan	2 December 1971	1990	2001	23	6–18	5–3	11–21
Lisa McShea	29 October 1974	2004	2004	1	0–0	1–0	1–0
Kerry Melville Reid	7 August 1947	1967	1979	29	20–4	17–6	37–10
Anne Minter	3 April 1963	1981	1989	23	16–6	4–0	20–6
Elizabeth Minter	23 August 1965	1984	1984	2	0–0	2–0	2–0
Alicia Molik	27 January 1981	1999	2010	22	12–15	6–6	18–21
Jessica Moore	16 August 1990	2008	2009	3	1–2	0–0	1–2
Jan O'Neill	9 July 1941	1963	1963	3	3–0	0–0	3–0
Ellen Perez	10 October 1995	2021	2025	8	0–0	5–3	5–3
Nicole Pratt	5 March 1973	1998	2007	20	14–12	1–1	15–13
Taylah Preston	27 October 2005	2024	2024	1	1–0	0–0	1–0
Anastasia Rodionova	12 May 1982	2010	2011	3	1–2	1–2	2–4
Arina Rodionova	15 December 1989	2016	2024	3	1–1	0–1	1–2
Olivia Rogowska	7 June 1991	2012	2015	3	0–1	0–2	0–3
Storm Sanders	11 August 1994	2021	2025	12	6–2	7–2	13–4
Elizabeth Smylie	11 April 1963	1984	1994	31	7–8	17–5	24–13
Bryanne Stewart	9 December 1979	2005	2005	3	0–0	2–1	2–1
Samantha Stosur	30 March 1984	2003	2022	34	29–20	10–1	39–21
Rennae Stubbs	26 March 1971	1992	2011	41	0–3	28–10	28–13
Judy Tegart Dalton	12 December 1965	1965	1970	15	6–1	12–3	18–4
Ajla Tomljanović	7 May 1993	2019	2024	9	4–6	0–0	4–6
Janine Tremelling	12 September 1967	1986	1990	5	0–0	4–1	4–1
Wendy Turnbull	26 November 1952	1977	1988	45	17–8	29–8	46–16
Lesley Turner Bowrey	16 August 1942	1963	1967	13	7–3	6–3	13–6
Christina Wheeler	15 April 1982	2004	2004	1	0–0	1–0	1–0
Janet Young	22 October 1951	1973	1974	7	0–0	6–0	6–0

== See also ==
- List of Australia Davis Cup team representatives
