= 2025 Australian Open – Women's singles =

Tennis championship

Women's singles
- 2025 Australian Open

Final
- Champion: (United States) Madison Keys
- Runner-up: Aryna Sabalenka
- Score: 6–3, 2–6, 7–5

Details
- Draw: 128
- Seeds: 32

Events
Singles	men	women		boys	girls
Doubles	men	women	mixed	boys	girls
WC Singles	men	women	quad	boys	girls
WC Doubles	men	women	quad	boys	girls

Qualification
Singles	men	women
- Australian Open

Madison Keys defeated two-time defending champion Aryna Sabalenka in the final, 6–3, 2–6, 7–5 to win the women's singles tennis title at the 2025 Australian Open. It was her first major title. Keys saved a match point en route to the title, in the semifinals against Iga Świątek. She was the fourth woman in the Open Era (after Evonne Goolagong Cawley at the 1980 Wimbledon Championships, Mary Pierce at the 1995 Australian Open and Li Na at the 2011 French Open) to defeat four top-10 seeds en route to a major title. Keys was the lowest-ranked player to win the title since Serena Williams in 2007. By reaching the final, she set the record for the longest gap between two major final appearances by any woman in the Open Era, eclipsing the previous record of seven years jointly held by Amélie Mauresmo (1999 to 2006 Australian Opens) and Victoria Azarenka (2013 to 2020 US Opens).

Sabalenka was attempting to become the first woman to win three consecutive Australian Open singles titles since Martina Hingis in 1999. She retained the world No. 1 singles ranking after Świątek lost in the semifinals. Coco Gauff was also in contention for the top ranking.

Eva Lys was the first lucky loser to reach the fourth round of the women's singles event in the Open Era, and only the sixth to do so at any major in the Open Era.

== Seeds ==
1. Aryna Sabalenka (final)
2. (Poland) Iga Świątek (semifinals)
3. (United States) Coco Gauff (quarterfinals)
4. (Italy) Jasmine Paolini (third round)
5. (China) Zheng Qinwen (second round)
6. (Kazakhstan) Elena Rybakina (fourth round)
7. (United States) Jessica Pegula (third round)
8. (United States) Emma Navarro (quarterfinals)
9. Daria Kasatkina (fourth round)
10. (United States) Danielle Collins (third round)
11. (Spain) Paula Badosa (semifinals)
12. Diana Shnaider (third round)
13. Anna Kalinskaya (withdrew)
14. Mirra Andreeva (fourth round)
15. (Brazil) Beatriz Haddad Maia (third round)
16. (Latvia) Jeļena Ostapenko (first round)
17. (Ukraine) Marta Kostyuk (third round)
18. (Croatia) Donna Vekić (fourth round)
19. (United States) Madison Keys (champion)
20. (Czech Republic) Karolína Muchová (second round)
21. Victoria Azarenka (first round)
22. (United Kingdom) Katie Boulter (second round)
23. (Poland) Magdalena Fręch (third round)
24. (Kazakhstan) Yulia Putintseva (third round)
25. Liudmila Samsonova (second round)
26. Ekaterina Alexandrova (first round)
27. Anastasia Pavlyuchenkova (quarterfinals)
28. (Ukraine) Elina Svitolina (quarterfinals)
29. (Czech Republic) Linda Nosková (first round)
30. (Canada) Leylah Fernandez (third round)
31. (Greece) Maria Sakkari (first round)
32. (Ukraine) Dayana Yastremska (third round)

Click on the seed number of a player to go to their draw section.

== Draw ==
Key

- Q = Qualifier
- WC = Wild card
- LL = Lucky loser
- Alt = Alternate
- ITF = ITF entry
- PR = Protected ranking
- SR = Special ranking
- SE = Special exempt
- JE = Junior exempt
- JR = Junior Accelerator Programme entrant
- CO = College Accelerator Programme entrant
- NG = Next Gen Accelerator Program entrant
- w/o = Walkover
- r = Retired
- d = Defaulted

=== Finals ===
Quarterfinals
1	Aryna Sabalenka	6	2	6
27	Anastasia Pavlyuchenkova	2	6	3
3	(United States) Coco Gauff	5	4
11	(Spain) Paula Badosa	7	6
19	(United States) Madison Keys	3	6	6
28	(Ukraine) Elina Svitolina	6	3	4
8	(United States) Emma Navarro	1	2
2	(Poland) Iga Świątek	6	6

Semifinals
1	Aryna Sabalenka	6	6
11	(Spain) Paula Badosa	4	2
19	(United States) Madison Keys	5	6	7^{10}
2	(Poland) Iga Świątek	7	1	6^{8}

Final
1	Aryna Sabalenka	3	6	5
19	(United States) Madison Keys	6	2	7

=== Top half ===
==== Section 1 ====
First round
1	A Sabalenka	6	6
(United States) S Stephens	3	2
(United Kingdom) S Kartal	1	6^{5}
(Spain) J Bouzas Maneiro	6	7^{7}
(United States) B Pera	6^{3}	4
(Germany) T Maria	7^{7}	6
(Denmark) C Tauson	5	6	6
29	(Czech Republic) L Nosková	7	3	4
23	(Poland) M Fręch	6	6
Q	P Kudermetova	4	4
A Blinkova	1	6	7
WC	(Australia) D Saville	6	4	5
(Japan) M Uchijima	4	6	7^{10}
(Poland) M Linette	6	2	6^{8}
(Czech Republic) M Bouzková	3	3
14	M Andreeva	6	6

Second round
1	A Sabalenka	6	7
(Spain) J Bouzas Maneiro	3	5
(Germany) T Maria	2	2
(Denmark) C Tauson	6	6
23	(Poland) M Fręch	0	6	6
A Blinkova	6	0	2
(Japan) M Uchijima	4	6	6^{8}
14	M Andreeva	6	3	7^{10}

Third round
1	A Sabalenka	7^{7}	6
(Denmark) C Tauson	6^{5}	4
23	(Poland) M Fręch	2	6	2
14	M Andreeva	6	1	6

Fourth round
1	A Sabalenka	6	6
14	M Andreeva	1	2

==== Section 2 ====
First round
12	D Shnaider	7^{7}	6
(Italy) E Cocciaretto	6^{4}	4
WC	(Australia) A Tomljanović	6	4	6
(United States) A Krueger	4	6	4
LL	(United Kingdom) H Dart	7	2	7^{10}
Q	(Croatia) J Fett	5	6	6^{7}
(France) D Parry	4	4
18	(Croatia) D Vekić	6	6
27	A Pavlyuchenkova	6	4	6
(China) Y Yuan	4	6	3
Q	(Slovenia) T Zidanšek	2	5
A Potapova	6	7
(Germany) L Siegemund	4	7	6
(United States) H Baptiste	6	5	4
Q	(Romania) A Todoni	6^{3}	1
5	(China) Q Zheng	7^{7}	6

Second round
12	D Shnaider	6	7
WC	(Australia) A Tomljanović	4	5
LL	(United Kingdom) H Dart	6	0	2
18	(Croatia) D Vekić	4	6	6
27	A Pavlyuchenkova	7^{7}	2	6
A Potapova	6^{2}	6	2
(Germany) L Siegemund	7^{7}	6
5	(China) Q Zheng	6^{3}	3

Third round
12	D Shnaider	6^{4}	7^{7}	5
18	(Croatia) D Vekić	7^{7}	6^{3}	7
27	A Pavlyuchenkova	6	6
(Germany) L Siegemund	1	2

Fourth round
18	(Croatia) D Vekić	6^{0}	0
27	A Pavlyuchenkova	7^{7}	6

==== Section 3 ====
First round
3	(United States) C Gauff	6	6
(United States) S Kenin	3	3
Q	(France) L Jeanjean	2	4
PR	(United Kingdom) J Burrage	6	6
(Spain) C Bucșa	6	6
WC	(France) C Paquet	2	3
(Ukraine) Y Starodubtseva	5	4
30	(Canada) L Fernandez	7	6
20	(Czech Republic) K Muchová	6	6
(Argentina) N Podoroska	1	1
(Japan) N Osaka	6	3	6
(France) C Garcia	3	6	3
Q	(Slovenia) V Erjavec	5	6^{2}
(Netherlands) S Lamens	7	7^{7}
PR	(Switzerland) B Bencic	6	7^{8}
16	(Latvia) J Ostapenko	3	6^{6}

Second round
3	(United States) C Gauff	6	7
PR	(United Kingdom) J Burrage	3	5
(Spain) C Bucșa	6	4	4
30	(Canada) L Fernandez	3	6	6
20	(Czech Republic) K Muchová	6	1	3
(Japan) N Osaka	1	6	6
(Netherlands) S Lamens	1	6^{3}
PR	(Switzerland) B Bencic	6	7^{7}

Third round
3	(United States) C Gauff	6	6
30	(Canada) L Fernandez	4	2
(Japan) N Osaka	6^{3}	0^{r}
PR	(Switzerland) B Bencic	7^{7}	0

Fourth round
3	(United States) C Gauff	5	6	6
PR	(Switzerland) B Bencic	7	2	1

==== Section 4 ====
First round
11	(Spain) P Badosa	6	7^{7}
(China) Xin Wang	3	6^{5}
(Turkey) Z Sönmez	6	6^{5}	1
WC	(Australia) T Gibson	3	7^{7}	6
(Germany) J Niemeier	6	6
Q	(Poland) M Chwalińska	0	1
Q	(Japan) N Hibino	6	3	1
17	(Ukraine) M Kostyuk	3	6	6
25	L Samsonova	6	6
K Rakhimova	2	4
(Netherlands) A Rus	4	4
(Serbia) O Danilović	6	6
(Belgium) E Mertens	4	7^{10}	6
Q	(Switzerland) V Golubic	6	6^{8}	4
WC	(Australia) M Joint	3	0
7	(United States) J Pegula	6	6

Second round
11	(Spain) P Badosa	6	6
WC	(Australia) T Gibson	1	0
(Germany) J Niemeier	3	0
17	(Ukraine) M Kostyuk	6	6
25	L Samsonova	1	2
(Serbia) O Danilović	6	6
(Belgium) E Mertens	4	2
7	(United States) J Pegula	6	6

Third round
11	(Spain) P Badosa	6	4	6
17	(Ukraine) M Kostyuk	4	6	3
(Serbia) O Danilović	7^{7}	6
7	(United States) J Pegula	6^{3}	1

Fourth round
11	(Spain) P Badosa	6	7^{7}
(Serbia) O Danilović	1	6^{2}

=== Bottom half ===
==== Section 5 ====
First round
6	(Kazakhstan) E Rybakina	6	6
WC	(Australia) E Jones	1	1
(Spain) N Párrizas Díaz	2	1
WC	(United States) I Jovic	6	6
PR	(Montenegro) D Kovinić	6	7
(New Zealand) L Sun	3	5
(Egypt) M Sherif	1	4
32	(Ukraine) D Yastremska	6	6
19	(United States) M Keys	6	7
(United States) A Li	4	5
(Romania) I-C Begu	4	0
Q	(Romania) E-G Ruse	6	6
(Belgium) G Minnen	7	5	6^{5}
Q	(Australia) D Aiava	5	7	7^{10}
Q	(Ukraine) D Snigur	6^{4}	3
10	(United States) D Collins	7^{7}	6

Second round
6	(Kazakhstan) E Rybakina	6	6
WC	(United States) I Jovic	0	3
PR	(Montenegro) D Kovinić	0	1
32	(Ukraine) D Yastremska	6	6
19	(United States) M Keys	7^{7}	2	7
Q	(Romania) E-G Ruse	6^{1}	6	5
Q	(Australia) D Aiava	6^{4}	6	2
10	(United States) D Collins	7^{7}	4	6

Third round
6	(Kazakhstan) E Rybakina	6	6
32	(Ukraine) D Yastremska	3	4
19	(United States) M Keys	6	6
10	(United States) D Collins	4	4

Fourth round
6	(Kazakhstan) E Rybakina	3	6	3
19	(United States) M Keys	6	1	6

==== Section 6 ====
First round
15	(Brazil) B Haddad Maia	4	7	6
Q	(Argentina) J Riera	6	5	2
PR	(China) S Zheng	1	6^{6}
E Andreeva	6	7^{8}
V Kudermetova	6	6
(Australia) O Gadecki	1	1
(Canada) R Marino	4	6	5
22	(United Kingdom) K Boulter	6	3	7
28	(Ukraine) E Svitolina	6	6
(Romania) S Cîrstea	4	4
Q	(Czech Republic) S Bejlek	6^{5}	2
(United States) C Dolehide	7^{7}	6
(United States) T Townsend	7^{8}	1	2
(Mexico) R Zarazúa	6^{6}	6	6
Q	(China) S Wei	0	4
4	(Italy) J Paolini	6	6

Second round
15	(Brazil) B Haddad Maia	6	6
E Andreeva	2	3
V Kudermetova	7^{7}	2	6
22	(United Kingdom) K Boulter	6^{3}	6	2
28	(Ukraine) E Svitolina	6	6
(United States) C Dolehide	1	4
(Mexico) R Zarazúa	2	3
4	(Italy) J Paolini	6	6

Third round
15	(Brazil) B Haddad Maia	4	2
V Kudermetova	6	6
28	(Ukraine) E Svitolina	2	6	6
4	(Italy) J Paolini	6	4	0

Fourth round
V Kudermetova	4	1
28	(Ukraine) E Svitolina	6	6

==== Section 7 ====
First round
8	(United States) E Navarro	6^{5}	7^{7}	7
(United States) P Stearns	7^{7}	6^{5}	5
(China) Xiy Wang	6	7
PR	(Austria) J Grabher	1	5
(Ukraine) A Kalinina	3	3
(Tunisia) O Jabeur	6	6
(Colombia) C Osorio	6	6^{4}	6
31	(Greece) M Sakkari	4	7^{7}	4
24	(Kazakhstan) Y Putintseva	4	7	6
(Armenia) E Avanesyan	6	5	2
WC	(China) S Zhang	6	6
(United States) M Kessler	3	4
(Hungary) A Bondár	6	3	4
(China) Y Wang	3	6	6
(Bulgaria) V Tomova	1	3
9	D Kasatkina	6	6

Second round
8	(United States) E Navarro	6	3	6
(China) Xiy Wang	3	6	4
(Tunisia) O Jabeur	7	6
(Colombia) C Osorio	5	3
24	(Kazakhstan) Y Putintseva	6	6
WC	(China) S Zhang	2	1
(China) Y Wang	2	0
9	D Kasatkina	6	6

Third round
8	(United States) E Navarro	6	3	6
(Tunisia) O Jabeur	4	6	4
24	(Kazakhstan) Y Putintseva	5	1
9	D Kasatkina	7	6

Fourth round
8	(United States) E Navarro	6	5	7
9	D Kasatkina	4	7	5

==== Section 8 ====
First round
LL	(Germany) E Lys	6	6
Q	(Australia) K Birrell	2	2
(France) V Gracheva	6	6
PR	(United States) C McNally	3	4
LL	(Croatia) P Martić	2	6	6^{7}
(Romania) J Cristian	6	4	7^{10}
(Italy) L Bronzetti	6	7^{7}
21	V Azarenka	2	6^{2}
26	E Alexandrova	6^{4}	6^{2}
(United Kingdom) E Raducanu	7^{7}	7^{7}
(Argentina) ML Carlé	2	3
(United States) A Anisimova	6	6
(Slovakia) R Šramková	3	6	6
(United States) K Volynets	6	2	2
(Czech Republic) K Siniaková	3	4
2	(Poland) I Świątek	6	6

Second round
LL	(Germany) E Lys	6	3	6
(France) V Gracheva	2	6	4
(Romania) J Cristian	7	7
(Italy) L Bronzetti	5	5
(United Kingdom) E Raducanu	6	7
(United States) A Anisimova	3	5
(Slovakia) R Šramková	0	2
2	(Poland) I Świątek	6	6

Third round
LL	(Germany) E Lys	4	6	6
(Romania) J Cristian	6	3	3
(United Kingdom) E Raducanu	1	0
2	(Poland) I Świątek	6	6

Fourth round
LL	(Germany) E Lys	0	1
2	(Poland) I Świątek	6	6

== Championship match statistics ==
Category	(United States) Keys	Sabalenka
1st serve %	58/87 (67%)	67/96 (70%)
1st serve points won	40 of 58 = 69%	40 of 67 = 60%
2nd serve points won	14 of 29 = 48%	18 of 29 = 62%
Total service points won	54 of 87 = 62.07%	58 of 96 = 60.42%
Aces	6	3
Double faults	0	5
Winners	29	29
Unforced errors	31	33
Net points won	6 of 15 = 40%	13 of 21 = 62%
Break points converted	4 of 9 = 44%	3 of 8 = 38%
Return points won	33 of 96 = 34%	33 of 87 = 38%
Total points won	92	91

== Seeded players ==
The following are the seeded players. Seedings are based on WTA rankings as of 6 January 2025. Rankings and points before are as of 13 January 2025.

Seed	Rank	Player	Points before	Points defending	Points won	Points after	Status
1	1	Aryna Sabalenka	9,656	2,000	1,300	8,956	Runner-up, lost to (United States) Madison Keys [19]
2	2	(Poland) Iga Świątek	8,120	130	780	8,770	Semifinals lost to (United States) Madison Keys [19]
3	3	(United States) Coco Gauff	6,888	780	430	6,538	Quarterfinals lost to (Spain) Paula Badosa [11]
4	4	(Italy) Jasmine Paolini	5,399	240	130	5,289	Third round lost to (Ukraine) Elina Svitolina [28]
5	5	(China) Zheng Qinwen	5,325	1,300	70	4,095	Second round lost to (Germany) Laura Siegemund
6	7	(Kazakhstan) Elena Rybakina	4,723	70	240	4,893	Fourth round lost to (United States) Madison Keys [19]
7	6	(United States) Jessica Pegula	4,801	70	130	4,861	Third round lost to (Serbia) Olga Danilović
8	8	(United States) Emma Navarro	3,409	130	430	3,709	Quarterfinals lost to (Poland) Iga Świątek [2]
9	10	Daria Kasatkina	3,151	70	240	3,321	Fourth round lost to (United States) Emma Navarro [8]
10	11	(United States) Danielle Collins	3,147	70	130	3,207	Third round lost to (United States) Madison Keys [19]
11	12	(Spain) Paula Badosa	2,958	130	780	3,608	Semifinals lost to Aryna Sabalenka [1]
12	13	Diana Shnaider	2,895	10	130	3,015	Third round lost to (Croatia) Donna Vekić [18]
13	16	Anna Kalinskaya	2,637	430	0	2,207	Withdrew due to illness
14	15	Mirra Andreeva	2,665	240	240	2,665	Fourth round lost to Aryna Sabalenka [1]
15	17	(Brazil) Beatriz Haddad Maia	2,554	130	130	2,554	Third round lost to Veronika Kudermetova
16	22	(Latvia) Jeļena Ostapenko	2,041	130	10	1,921	First round lost to (Switzerland) Belinda Bencic [PR]
17	18	(Ukraine) Marta Kostyuk	2,364	430	130	2,064	Third round lost to (Spain) Paula Badosa [11]
18	19	(Croatia) Donna Vekić	2,228	10	240	2,458	Fourth round lost to Anastasia Pavlyuchenkova [27]
19	14	(United States) Madison Keys	2,680	0	2,000	4,680	Champion, defeated Aryna Sabalenka [1]
20	20	(Czech Republic) Karolína Muchová	2,079	0	70	2,149	Second round lost to (Japan) Naomi Osaka
21	24	Victoria Azarenka	1,992	240	10	1,762	First round lost to (Italy) Lucia Bronzetti
22	25	(United Kingdom) Katie Boulter	1,931	70	70	1,931	Second round lost to Veronika Kudermetova
23	26	(Poland) Magdalena Fręch	1,910	240	130	1,800	Third round lost to Mirra Andreeva [14]
24	23	(Kazakhstan) Yulia Putintseva	2,017	10	130	2,137	Third round lost to Daria Kasatkina [9]
25	21	Liudmila Samsonova	2,070	10	70	2,130	Second round lost to (Serbia) Olga Danilović
26	31	Ekaterina Alexandrova	1,713	10	10	1,713	First round lost to (United Kingdom) Emma Raducanu
27	32	Anastasia Pavlyuchenkova	1,675	70	430	2,035	Quarterfinals lost to Aryna Sabalenka [1]
28	27	(Ukraine) Elina Svitolina	1,779	240	430	1,969	Quarterfinals lost to (United States) Madison Keys [19]
29	28	(Czech Republic) Linda Nosková	1,778	430	10	1,358	First round lost to (Denmark) Clara Tauson
30	29	(Canada) Leylah Fernandez	1,755	70	130	1,815	Third round lost to (United States) Coco Gauff [3]
31	30	(Greece) Maria Sakkari	1,727	70	10	1,667	First round lost to (Colombia) Camila Osorio
32	33	(Ukraine) Dayana Yastremska	1,594	820	130	904	Third round lost to (Kazakhstan) Elena Rybakina [6]

=== Withdrawn players ===
The following players would have been seeded, but withdrew before the tournament began.

Rank	Player	Points before	Points defending	Points after	Withdrawal reason
9	(Czech Republic) Barbora Krejčíková	3,213	430	2,783	Back injury

== Other entry information ==
=== Wildcards ===
- (Australia) Talia Gibson
- (Australia) Maya Joint
- (Australia) Emerson Jones
- (United States) Iva Jovic
- (France) Chloé Paquet
- (Australia) Daria Saville
- (Australia) Ajla Tomljanović
- (China) Zhang Shuai

=== Protected ranking ===
- (Switzerland) Belinda Bencic (15)
- (United States) Caty McNally (71)
- (Austria) Julia Grabher (73)
- (United Kingdom) Jodie Burrage (85)
- (China) Zheng Saisai (89)
- (Montenegro) Danka Kovinić (95)

=== Qualifiers ===
- (Australia) Destanee Aiava
- (Czech Republic) Sára Bejlek
- (Australia) Kimberly Birrell
- (Poland) Maja Chwalińska
- (Slovenia) Veronika Erjavec
- (Croatia) Jana Fett
- (Switzerland) Viktorija Golubic
- (Japan) Nao Hibino
- (France) Léolia Jeanjean
- Polina Kudermetova
- (Argentina) Julia Riera
- (Romania) Elena-Gabriela Ruse
- (Ukraine) Daria Snigur
- (Romania) Anca Todoni
- (China) Wei Sijia
- (Slovenia) Tamara Zidanšek

=== Lucky losers ===
- (United Kingdom) Harriet Dart
- (Germany) Eva Lys
- (Croatia) Petra Martić

=== Withdrawals ===
The entry list was released by Tennis Australia based on the WTA rankings for the week of 2 December 2024.

- ‡ (Czech Republic) Karolína Plíšková (41) → replaced by (Spain) Nuria Párrizas Díaz (99)
- ‡ (Denmark) Caroline Wozniacki (72) → replaced by (Ukraine) Yuliia Starodubtseva (100)
- ‡ (Czech Republic) Barbora Krejčíková (10) → replaced by (Canada) Rebecca Marino (101)
- @ (France) Clara Burel (73) → replaced by (Croatia) Petra Martić (LL)
- § (Czech Republic) Markéta Vondroušová (39) → replaced by (United Kingdom) Harriet Dart (LL)
- § Anna Kalinskaya (14) → replaced by (Germany) Eva Lys (LL)

‡ – withdrew from entry list before qualifying began
@ – withdrew from entry list after qualifying began
§ – withdrew from main draw

== See also ==
- 2025 Australian Open – Men's singles

Preceded by 2024 US Open – Women's singles	Grand Slam women's singles	Succeeded by 2025 French Open – Women's singles
