= Talia Gibson =

Australian tennis player (born 2004)

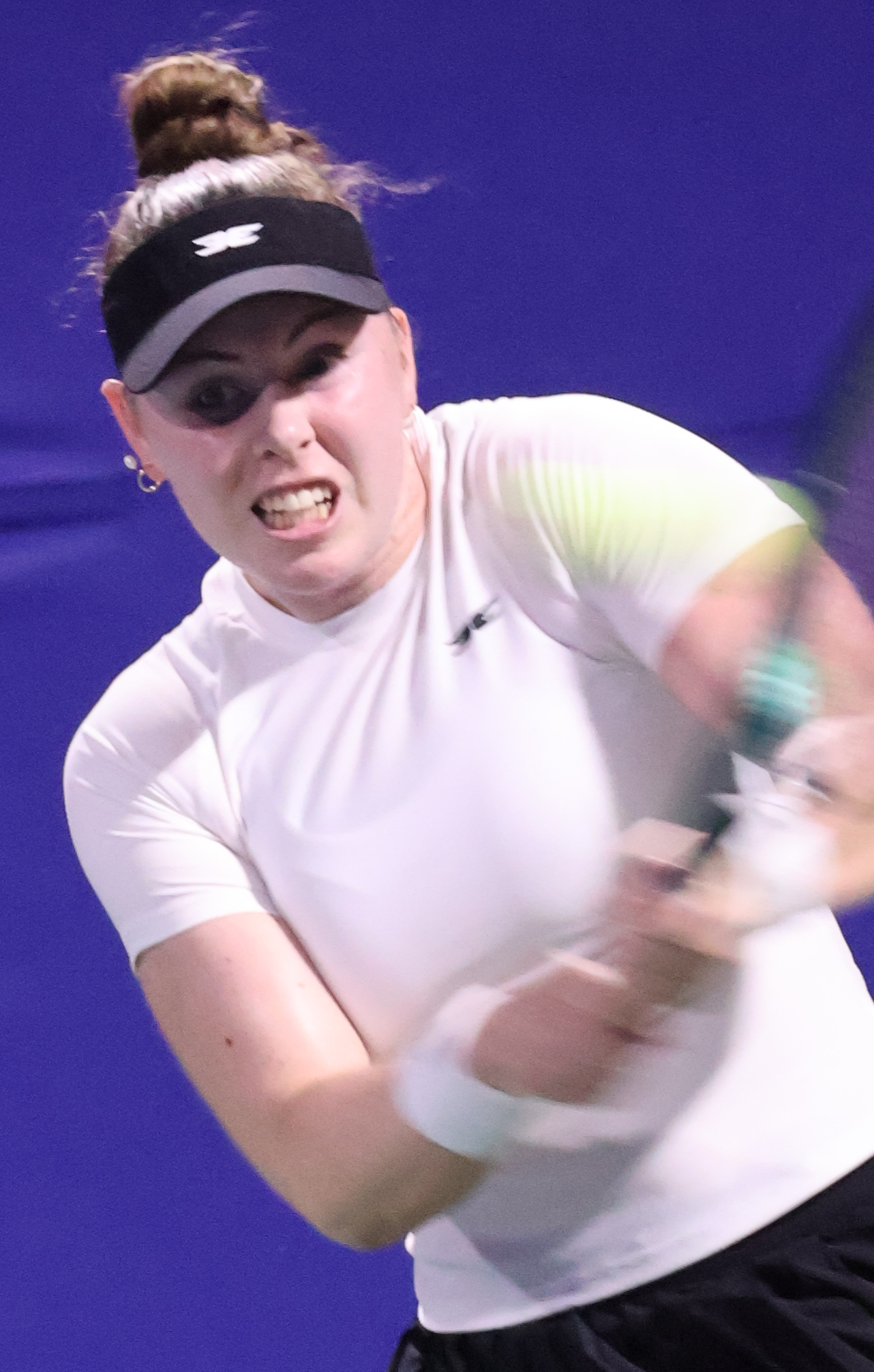
- Gibson in 2024
- Country (sports): Australia
- Born: 18 June 2004 (age 22) Perth, Australia
- Height: 1.76 m (5 ft 9 in)
- Plays: Right (two-handed backhand)
- Prize money: $2,057,514

Singles
- Career record: 219–129
- Career titles: 12 ITF
- Highest ranking: No. 36 (2 November 2026)
- Current ranking: No. 36 (2 November 2026)

Grand Slam singles results
- Australian Open: 2R (2025, 2026)
- French Open: 1R (2026)
- Wimbledon: 1R (2025, 2026)
- US Open: 1R (2025, 2026)

Doubles
- Career record: 104–53
- Career titles: 1 WTA 125
- Highest ranking: No. 79 (19 October 2026)
- Current ranking: No. 79 (2 November 2026)

Grand Slam doubles results
- Australian Open: QF (2026)
- French Open: 1R (2026)
- Wimbledon: 2R (2026)
- US Open: 1R (2026)

Grand Slam mixed doubles results
- Australian Open: 1R (2026)
- Last updated on: 2 November 2026.

Talia Gibson (born 18 June 2004) is an Australian professional tennis player. She has a career-high singles ranking by the WTA of No. 36, achieved on 2 November 2026, and a best in doubles of No. 79, reached on 19 October 2026. She is the current No. 1 Australian singles player.

== Career ==
=== 2023: Major and WTA Tour debuts ===
Gibson made her WTA Tour debut at the Hobart International as a wildcard entrant, losing to Tatjana Maria in the first round.

She made her first Grand Slam appearance at the Australian Open, again as a wildcard, but lost in the first round to Clara Burel.

=== 2024: Back to back ITF titles, top 125 ===
Gibson won back to back the W75 singles titles at the Perth Tennis International, defeating Maddison Inglis in the final, and the following week at the Perth International 2, where she overcame Eri Shimizu in the championship match.

=== 2025: Grand Slam win ===
As a wildcard entrant at the Australian Open, Gibson secured her maiden major win and first against a player ranked in the WTA top 100, when she defeated world No. 94, Zeynep Sönmez, in the first round. She lost in the second to Paula Badosa.

She qualified to make her debut at Wimbledon, but lost to Naomi Osaka in the first round. As a qualifier at Tennis in the Land, Gibson recorded her second tour-level win by defeating Greet Minnen in the first round, before losing to second seed Wang Xinyu in her next match. She was given a wildcard into the main draw at the US Open, but lost to 28th seed Magdalena Fręch in the first round.

=== 2026: WTA 500 singles final, top 50 ===
Partnering with Kimberly Birrell, Gibson reached the quarterfinals in the doubles at the Australian Open, defeating second seeds Sara Errani and Jasmine Paolini in the second round, then 16th seeds Kristina Mladenovic and Guo Hanyu in the third, before losing to Ena Shibahara and Vera Zvonareva in the last eight.

Ranked No. 112, Gibson qualified for the Indian Wells Open and won her first WTA 1000 main-draw match over world No. 41, Ann Li, before defeating No. 11, Ekaterina Alexandrova, and No. 17, Clara Tauson, to reach the fourth round, recording her first two top-20 career wins. She then defeated world No. 7, Jasmine Paolini, in three sets, for her maiden win over a top-10 player, to make it into her first WTA Tour quarterfinal. In the last eight, Gibson lost to 14th seed Linda Nosková. As a result of her run, she reached the top 100 in the singles rankings at world No. 68, rising 44 spots. Gibson continued her good form by qualifying for Miami, where she defeated Sára Bejlek and recorded two more top-20 wins against world No. 15, Naomi Osaka, and world No. 17, Iva Jovic, to reach the fourth round of her second WTA 1000 event in a row. She lost to world No. 2, Elena Rybakina, in the fourth round. Despite her defeat, she reached a new career-high ranking of world No. 55, on 18 May 2026.

Gibson was selected in the Australian team for their in the BJK Cup qualifier against Great Britain in Melbourne. She made her debut in the competition in the opening singles match, losing to 17 year old world No. 275, Mika Stojsavljevic, in straight sets. Gaining entry direct through her ranking, Gibson made her French Open main-draw debut, but lost to Yulia Putintseva in the first round.

Teaming up with Janice Tjen, she won her first WTA 125 title in doubles at the grass-court Birmingham Open in June. Two weeks later at the Nottingham Open, Gibson overcame wildcard entrant Francesca Jones and Olympic champion Zheng Qinwen to reach the quarterfinals, at which point she lost to Karolína Plíšková.

In August at the Canadian Open, she overcame Elisabetta Cocciaretto who retired due to injury, and French Open finalist Maja Chwalińska to reach her third WTA 1000 third round of the year, in which she lost to 16th seed Ekaterina Alexandrova. She lost to Donna Vekić in the first round of the US Open, in three sets.

At the WTA 500 Singapore Open, Gibson defeated wildcard entrant Fiona Ferro, lucky loser Viktória Morvayová and seventh seed Maria Sakkari, before being advanced to her first WTA Tour final when her scheduled semifinal opponent, Tatiana Prozorova, was withdrawn from the tournament, after failing a concussion test having been hit on the head by a ball during a doubles match. Gibson lost the championship match to sixth seed Leylah Fernandez. Despite her defeat, she entered the top 40 in the WTA rankings for the first time at world No. 37 on 28 September 2026.

Seeded fourth at the Japan Open, she defeated qualifiers Harriet Dart and Sinja Kraus to make it through to the quarterfinals, where she lost to Ashlyn Krueger. Partnering with Maddison Inglis, Gibson reached her first WTA Tour doubles final at the Hong Kong Open, losing to second seeds Chan Hao-ching and Miyu Kato in straight sets.

== Performance timelines ==
Key
W	F	SF	QF	#R	RR	Q#	DNQ	A	NH

(W) winner; (F) finalist; (SF) semifinalist; (QF) quarterfinalist; (#R) rounds 4, 3, 2, 1; (RR) round-robin stage; (Q#) qualification round; (DNQ) did not qualify; (A) absent; (NH) not held; (SR) strike rate (events won / competed); (W–L) win–loss record.
To avoid confusion and double counting, these charts are updated at the conclusion of a tournament or when the player's participation has ended.

Only main-draw results in WTA Tour, Grand Slam tournaments, Billie Jean King Cup, United Cup, Hopman Cup and Olympic Games are included in win–loss records.

=== Singles ===
Current through the 2026 US Open.

Tournament	2022	2023	2024	2025	2026	SR	W–L	Win%
Grand Slam tournaments
Australian Open	Q1	1R	Q2	2R	2R	0 / 3	2–3	40%
French Open	A	A	Q1	Q2	1R	0 / 1	0–1	0%
Wimbledon	A	A	Q3	1R	1R	0 / 2	0–2	0%
US Open	A	A	Q3	1R	1R	0 / 2	0–2	0%
Win–Loss	0–0	0–1	0–0	1–3	1–4	0 / 8	2–8	20%
WTA 1000 tournaments
Qatar Open	A	NTI	A	A	A	0 / 0	0–0	–
Dubai Championships	NTI	A	A	A	A	0 / 0	0–0	–
Indian Wells	A	A	A	A	QF	0 / 1	4–1	80%
Miami Open	A	A	A	A	4R	0 / 1	3–1	75%
Madrid Open	A	A	A	A	1R	0 / 1	0–1	0%
Italian Open	A	A	A	A	2R	0 / 1	2–1	67%
Canadian Open	A	A	A	Q1	3R	0 / 1	2–1	67%
Cincinnati Open	A	A	A	A	2R	0 / 1	1–1	50%
China Open	NH	A	A	A		0 / 0	0–0	–
Wuhan Open	Not Held		A	A		0 / 0	0–0	–
Career statistics
Tournaments	0	2	0	5	15	Career total: 22		
Overall win–loss	0–0	0–2	0–0	2–5	13–15	0 / 22	15–22	41%
Year-end ranking	364	301	125	136		$1,932,154		

=== Doubles ===
Tournament	2023	2024	2025	2026	W–L
Australian Open	1R	1R	1R	QF	3–4
French Open	A	A	A	1R	0–1
Wimbledon	A	A	A	2R	1–1
US Open	A	A	A	1R	0–1
Win–loss	0–1	0–1	0–1	4–4	4–7

== WTA Tour finals ==
=== Singles: 1 (runner-up) ===
Legend WTA 500 (0–1)	Finals by surface Hard (0–1)	Finals by setting Indoor (0–1)

Result	W–L	Date	Tournament	Tier	Surface	Opponent	Score
Loss	0–1	Sep 2026	Singapore Open, Singapore	WTA 500	Hard (i)	(Canada) Leylah Fernandez	5–7, 0–6

=== Doubles: 1 (runner-up) ===
Legend WTA 250 (0–1)	Finals by surface Hard (0–1)

Result	W–L	Date	Tournament	Tier	Surface	Partner	Opponents	Score
Loss	0–1	Nov 2026	Hong Kong Open, China	WTA 250	Hard	(Australia) Maddison Inglis	(Chinese Taipei) Chan Hao-ching (Japan) Miyu Kato	4–6, 4–6

== WTA 125 finals ==
=== Doubles: 1 (title) ===
Result	W–L	Date	Tournament	Surface	Partner	Opponents	Score
Win	1–0	Jun 2026	Birmingham Open, United Kingdom	Grass	(Indonesia) Janice Tjen	(United Kingdom) Harriet Dart (United Kingdom) Maia Lumsden	6–4, 6–3

== ITF Circuit finals ==
=== Singles: 19 (12 titles, 7 runner-ups) ===
Legend W60/75 tournaments (6–1) W50 tournaments (1–1) W25/35 tournaments (2–4) W15 tournaments (3–1)	Finals by surface Hard (12–7)

Result	W–L	Date	Tournament	Tier	Surface	Opponent	Score
Loss	0–1	Apr 2022	ITF Chiang Rai, Thailand	W15	Hard	(Thailand) Luksika Kumkhum	0–6, 1–6
Win	1–1	June 2022	Rancho Santa Fe Open, United States	W15	Hard	Maria Kozyreva	7–6^{(4)}, 3–6, 7–6^{(5)}
Win	2–1	Jul 2022	ITF Caloundra, Australia	W15	Hard	(Australia) Destanee Aiava	7–6^{(4)}, 6–4
Win	3–1	Jul 2022	ITF Caloundra, Australia	W15	Hard	(Australia) Destanee Aiava	6–4, 3–2 ret.
Loss	3–2	Sep 2022	ITF Darwin, Australia	W25	Hard	(Australia) Alexandra Bozovic	6–3, 3–6, 3–6
Loss	3–3	Jul 2023	ITF Foxhills, United Kingdom	W25	Hard	(United Kingdom) Katy Dunne	4–6, 6–3, 4–6
Loss	3–4	Sep 2023	ITF Perth, Australia	W25	Hard	(Australia) Priscilla Hon	1–6, 6–3, 3–6
Loss	3–5	Sep 2023	ITF Perth, Australia	W25	Hard	(Australia) Taylah Preston	5–7, 1–6
Win	4–5	Dec 2023	Gold Coast International, Australia	W60	Hard	(Australia) Olivia Gadecki	7–5, 6–2
Win	5–5	Dec 2023	ITF Papamoa, New Zealand	W25	Hard	(Australia) Ivana Popovic	6–3, 6–4
Loss	5–6	Mar 2024	Branik Maribor Open, Slovenia	W75	Hard (i)	(Czech Republic) Dominika Šalková	2–6, 4–6
Loss	5–7	May 2024	ITF Montemor-o-Novo, Portugal	W50	Hard	(Italy) Lucrezia Stefanini	4–6, 0–6
Win	6–7	Sep 2024	Perth International, Australia	W75	Hard	(Australia) Maddison Inglis	6–7^{(5)}, 6–1, 6–3
Win	7–7	Sep 2024	Perth International 2, Australia	W75	Hard	(Japan) Eri Shimizu	6–2, 6–4
Win	8–7	Sep 2024	ITF Cairns, Australia	W35	Hard	(Australia) Lizette Cabrera	6–2, 7–6^{(2)}
Win	9–7	Mar 2025	Open Nantes Atlantique, France	W50	Hard (i)	(Malta) Francesca Curmi	3–6, 7–5, 6–1
Win	10–7	Jul 2025	Championnats de Granby, Canada	W75	Hard	(United States) Fiona Crawley	6–3, 6–4
Win	11–7	Nov 2025	Sydney Challenger, Australia	W75	Hard	(Australia) Emerson Jones	6–2, 6–4
Win	12–7	Feb 2026	Queensland International, Australia	W75	Hard	(Japan) Nao Hibino	6–3, 7–6^{(7)}

=== Doubles: 15 (9 titles, 6 runner-ups) ===
Legend W60/75 tournaments (5–0) W50 tournaments (0–1) W25 tournaments (3–5) W15 tournaments (1–0)	Finals by surface Hard (8–5) Grass (0–1) Carpet (1–0)

Result	W–L	Date	Tournament	Tier	Surface	Partner	Opponents	Score
Win	1–0	Apr 2022	ITF Chiang Rai, Thailand	W15	Hard	(Australia) Catherine Aulia	(China) Ma Yexin (China) Xun Fangying	6–3, 7–6^{(5)}
Win	2–0	Sep 2022	ITF Darwin, Australia	W25	Hard	(Australia) Petra Hule	(Australia) Lisa Mays (Japan) Ramu Ueda	2–6, 7–5, [10–5]
Win	3–0	Sep 2022	ITF Cairns, Australia	W25	Hard	(Australia) Petra Hule	(Australia) Alana Parnaby (Australia) Taylah Preston	6–1, 6–4
Win	4–0	Oct 2022	Playford International, Australia	W60	Hard	(Australia) Alexandra Bozovic	(South Korea) Han Na-lae (Indonesia) Priska Madelyn Nugroho	7–5, 6–4
Win	5–0	May 2023	Kurume Cup, Japan	W60	Carpet	(China) Wang Yafan	(Japan) Funa Kozaki (Japan) Junri Namigata	6–3, 6–3
Loss	5–1	May 2023	ITF Karuizawa, Japan	W25	Grass	(Japan) Akari Inoue	(Japan) Momoko Kobori (Japan) Ayano Shimizu	6–3, 6–7^{(6)}, [5–10]
Loss	5–2	Jun 2023	ITF Tokyo, Japan	W25	Hard	(Japan) Natsumi Kawaguchi	(Thailand) Luksika Kumkhum (Japan) Kanako Morisaki	6–1, 2–6, [3–10]
Win	6–2	Jul 2023	ITF Corroios, Portugal	W25	Hard	(Australia) Petra Hule	(Belgium) Sofia Costoulas (Switzerland) Lulu Sun	6–3, 3–6, [10–6]
Loss	6–3	Jul 2023	ITF Foxhills, United Kingdom	W25	Hard	(Australia) Petra Hule	(Australia) Destanee Aiava (India) Rutuja Bhosale	2–6, 3–6
Loss	6–4	Aug 2023	ITF Roehampton, United Kingdom	W25	Hard	(Australia) Petra Hule	(Georgia (country)) Mariam Bolkvadze (United Kingdom) Lily Miyazaki	5–7, 3–6
Loss	6–5	Sep 2023	ITF Perth, Australia	W25	Hard	(Australia) Taylah Preston	(Australia) Destanee Aiava (Australia) Maddison Inglis	3–6, 6–7^{(5)}
Win	7–5	Oct 2023	Playford International, Australia	W60	Hard	(Australia) Priscilla Hon	(Australia) Kaylah McPhee (Australia) Astra Sharma	6–1, 6–2
Win	8–5	Nov 2023	Brisbane QTC International, Australia	W60	Hard	(Australia) Priscilla Hon	(Australia) Destanee Aiava (Australia) Maddison Inglis	4–6, 7–5, [10–5]
Win	9–5	Sep 2024	Perth International, Australia	W75	Hard	(Australia) Maddison Inglis	(Japan) Erina Hayashi (Japan) Saki Imamura	6–2, 6–4
Loss	9–6	Mar 2025	Open Nantes Atlantique, France	W50	Hard (i)	(Belgium) Sofia Costoulas	(Poland) Martyna Kubka (Sweden) Lisa Zaar	3–6, 2–6

== Wins over top-10 players ==
- Gibson has a 1–2 record against players who were, at the time the match was played, ranked in the top 10.

#	Opponent	Rk	Event	Surface	Rd	Score	Rk
2026
1.	(Italy) Jasmine Paolini	7	Indian Wells Open, United States	Hard	4R	7–5, 2–6, 6–1	112
