= Saki Imamura =

Japanese tennis player (born 2002)

Saki Imamura 今村 咲
- Country (sports): Japan
- Born: 6 April 2002 (age 24) Kyoto, Japan
- Plays: Right (two-handed both sides)
- Prize money: $98,987

Singles
- Career record: 174–123
- Career titles: 4 ITF
- Highest ranking: No. 343 (13 October 2025)
- Current ranking: No. 542 (13 July 2026)

Doubles
- Career record: 133–62
- Career titles: 15 ITF
- Highest ranking: No. 188 (6 October 2025)
- Current ranking: No. 302 (13 July 2026)
- Last updated on: 14 July 2026.

Saki Imamura (今村 咲, Imamura Saki; born 6 April 2002) is a Japanese tennis player.

Imamura has a career-high singles ranking of 343 by the WTA, achieved on 13 October 2025, and a best doubles ranking of 188, achieved on 6 October 2025. So far, she has won four singles titles and fifteen in doubles on the ITF Circuit.

In 2023, Imamura won her first $40k title with her Japanese partner Erina Hayashi, at an ITF event in Bhopal, India. The Japanese duo defeated Russian pair of Ekaterina Makarova and Ekaterina Reyngold in the final.

== ITF Circuit finals ==
=== Singles: 9 (4 titles, 5 runner-ups) ===
Legend W15 tournaments (4–5)	Finals by surface Hard (4–5)

Result	W–L	Date	Tournament	Tier	Surface	Opponent	Score
Loss	0–1	Jun 2021	ITF Monastir, Tunisia	W15	Hard	(Zimbabwe) Valeria Bhunu	2–6, 2–6
Loss	0–2	May 2022	ITF Cancún, Mexico	W15	Hard	(Canada) Stacey Fung	4–6, 5–7
Loss	0–3	May 2022	ITF Cancún, Mexico	W15	Hard	(Canada) Stacey Fung	3–6, 3–6
Loss	0–4	Aug 2022	ITF Monastir, Tunisia	W15	Hard	(Indonesia) Priska Madelyn Nugroho	0–6, 3–6
Win	1–4	Aug 2022	ITF Monastir, Tunisia	W15	Hard	(India) Jennifer Luikham	6–1, 6–1
Win	2–4	Feb 2024	ITF Nakhon Si Thammarat, Thailand	W15	Hard	(China) Yao Xinxin	7–6^{(7)}, 7–5
Win	3–4	Feb 2024	ITF Nakhon Si Thammarat, Thailand	W15	Hard	(China) Yuan Chengyiyi	6–2, 6–7^{(4)}, 6–2
Loss	3–5	Jun 2024	ITF Hong Kong, China SAR	W15	Hard	(Indonesia) Priska Madelyn Nugroho	3–6, 4–6
Win	4–5	Jun 2025	ITF Osaka, Japan	W15	Hard	(Australia) Stefani Webb	6–4, 6–1

=== Doubles: 24 (15 titles, 9 runner-ups) ===
Legend W100 tournaments (1–0) W75 tournaments (0–2) W40/50 tournaments (4–1) W25/35 tournaments (4–4) W15 tournaments (6–2)	Finals by surface Hard (15–9)

Result	W–L	Date	Tournament	Tier	Surface	Partner	Opponents	Score
Loss	0–1	Jun 2021	ITF Monastir, Tunisia	W15	Hard	(South Korea) Shin Ji-ho	(Croatia) Mariana Dražić (Uzbekistan) Sabina Sharipova	7–6^{(1)}, 4–6, [0–10]
Loss	0–2	Mar 2022	ITF Sharm El Sheikh, Egypt	W15	Hard	(Japan) Mei Hasegawa	(Czech Republic) Linda Klimovičová (Czech Republic) Dominika Šalková	1–6, 4–6
Win	1–2	May 2022	ITF Cancún, Mexico	W15	Hard	(Chinese Taipei) Tsao Chia-yi	(Guatemala) Melissa Morales (Guatemala) Kirsten-Andrea Weedon	6–3, 6–1
Win	2–2	May 2022	ITF Cancún, Mexico	W15	Hard	(Japan) Miho Kuramochi	(United States) Kariann Pierre-Louis (Dominican Republic) Kelly Williford	3–6, 6–3, [10–8]
Win	3–2	Jun 2022	ITF Gurugram, India	W25	Hard	(Indonesia) Priska Madelyn Nugroho	(Japan) Momoko Kobori (Japan) Misaki Matsuda	6–4, 7–5
Win	4–2	Aug 2022	ITF Monastir, Tunisia	W15	Hard	(Indonesia) Priska Madelyn Nugroho	(France) Nina Radovanovic (China) Yao Xinxin	6–3, 6–2
Win	5–2	Aug 2022	ITF Monastir, Tunisia	W15	Hard	(Indonesia) Priska Madelyn Nugroho	(France) Yasmine Mansouri (Japan) Naho Sato	6–1, 6–3
Win	6–2	Aug 2022	ITF Monastir, Tunisia	W15	Hard	(Japan) Honoka Kobayashi	(China) Li Zongyu (Australia) Mia Repac	3–6, 6–0, [10–6]
Win	7–2	Nov 2022	ITF Yokohama, Japan	W15	Hard	(Japan) Naho Sato	(South Korea) Han Na-lae (Japan) Mai Hontama	6–4, 4–6, [10–5]
Win	8–2	Jan 2023	ITF Bhopal, India	W40	Hard	(Japan) Erina Hayashi	Ekaterina Makarova; Ekaterina Reyngold	6–3, 7–6^{(3)}
Loss	8–3	Apr 2023	ITF Kashiwa, Japan	W25	Hard	(Japan) Naho Sato	(Netherlands) Arianne Hartono (Australia) Priscilla Hon	6–4, 3–6, [7–10]
Loss	8–4	Aug 2023	ITF Aldershot, UK	W25	Hard	(Japan) Erina Hayashi	(Australia) Destanee Aiava (United Kingdom) Sarah Beth Grey	4–6, 3–6
Win	9–4	Dec 2023	ITF Solapur, India	W25	Hard	(Japan) Hiromi Abe	(Japan) Funa Kozaki (Japan) Misaki Matsuda	6–3, 6–1
Loss	9–5	Jan 2024	ITF Indore, India	W50	Hard	(Japan) Mana Kawamura	(United States) Jessie Aney (Germany) Lena Papadakis	6–2, 0–6, [7–10]
Win	10–5	Mar 2024	Kōfu International Open, Japan	W50	Hard	(Japan) Erina Hayashi	(India) Rutuja Bhosale (India) Ankita Raina	6–3, 7–5
Win	11–5	Jun 2024	ITF Hong Kong, China SAR	W15	Hard	(Japan) Hiromi Abe	(China) Dang Yiming; Anastasia Zolotareva	6–4, 6–1
Loss	11–6	Jul 2024	ITF Hong Kong	W35	Hard	(Japan) Hiromi Abe	(Hong Kong) Eudice Chong (Hong Kong) Cody Wong	4–6, 6–3, [7–10]
Loss	11–7	Sep 2024	Perth International, Australia	W75	Hard	(Japan) Erina Hayashi	(Australia) Talia Gibson (Australia) Maddison Inglis	2–6, 4–6
Win	12–7	Mar 2025	All Japan Indoor Championships	W50	Hard	(South Korea) Park So-hyun	(Japan) Momoko Kobori (Japan) Ayano Shimizu	7–5, 6–4
Win	13–7	Apr 2025	ITF Goyang, South Korea	W35	Hard	(Indonesia) Janice Tjen	(South Korea) Kim Na-ri (Thailand) Punnin Kovapitukted	4–6, 6–0, [10–5]
Loss	13–8	Jun 2025	ITF Luzhou, China	W35	Hard	(Japan) Ikumi Yamazaki	(Indonesia) Priska Madelyn Nugroho (Indonesia) Janice Tjen	4–6, 3–6
Loss	13–9	Jul 2025	Championnats de Granby, Canada	W75	Hard	(Japan) Wakana Sonobe	(Canada) Alexandra Vagramov (Czech Republic) Darja Viďmanová	6–7^{(5)}, 3–6
Win	14–9	Aug 2025	Saskatoon Challenger, Canada	W50	Hard	(Japan) Hiroko Kuwata	(Canada) Raphaëlle Lacasse (Canada) Alexandra Vagramov	7–6^{(3)}, 3–6, [10–1]
Win	15–9	Sep 2025	ITF Incheon, Korea	W100	Hard	(South Korea) Park So-hyun	(Japan) Hiroko Kuwata (Indonesia) Priska Madelyn Nugroho	6–3, 4–6, [10–7]
