= 2024 City of Playford Tennis International – Men's singles =

Men's singles
- 2024 City of Playford Tennis International

Final
- Champion: (Australia) Rinky Hijikata
- Runner-up: (Japan) Yuta Shimizu
- Score: 6–4, 7–6^{(7–4)}

Events
Singles	men	women
Doubles	men	women
← 2023 ·	City of Playford Tennis International	· 2025 →

James Duckworth was the defending champion but chose not to defend his title.

Rinky Hijikata won the title after defeating Yuta Shimizu 6–4, 7–6^{(7–4)} in the final.

== Seeds ==
1. (Australia) Rinky Hijikata (champion)
2. (Australia) Thanasi Kokkinakis (withdrew)
3. (Japan) Shintaro Mochizuki (quarterfinals)
4. (Australia) Tristan Schoolkate (quarterfinals)
5. (Australia) Alex Bolt (withdrew)
6. (Australia) Li Tu (quarterfinals)
7. (Australia) Omar Jasika (quarterfinals)
8. (Australia) Marc Polmans (semifinals)

== Draw ==
=== Key ===
- Q = Qualifier
- WC = Wild card
- LL = Lucky loser
- Alt = Alternate
- SE = Special exempt
- PR = Protected ranking
- ITF = ITF entry
- JE = Junior exempt
- w/o = Walkover
- r = Retired
- d = Defaulted
- SR = Special ranking

=== Finals ===
Semifinals
1	(Australia) Rinky Hijikata	5	6	6
(Japan) Masamichi Imamura	7	4	4
8	(Australia) Marc Polmans	0	3
(Japan) Yuta Shimizu	6	6

Final
1	(Australia) Rinky Hijikata	6	7^{7}
(Japan) Yuta Shimizu	4	6^{4}

=== Top half ===
First round
1	(Australia) R Hijikata	7^{7}	7^{7}
Q	(United Kingdom) Emile Hudd	6^{4}	6^{2}
(Australia) B Ellis	2	5
(Australia) D Sweeny	6	7
(United States) Christian Langmo	6	4	6
Q	(Australia) Pavle Marinkov	3	6	3
(Japan) Takuya Kumasaka	5	2
7	(Australia) O Jasika	7	6
4	(Australia) T Schoolkate	6	6
WC	(Australia) Ja Delaney	4	3
(Australia) Jacob Bradshaw	6	5	3
WC	(Australia) M Bouzige	4	7	6
(Japan) M Imamura	7^{7}	6
Q	(Northern Mariana Islands) C Sinclair	6^{4}	3
WC	(Australia) E Winter	5	6^{2}
LL	(Australia) T Fancutt	7	7^{7}

Second round
1	(Australia) R Hijikata	6	6
(Australia) D Sweeny	4	3
(United States) C Langmo	3	3
7	(Australia) O Jasika	6	6
4	(Australia) T Schoolkate	6	6
WC	(Australia) M Bouzige	1	2
(Japan) M Imamura	6	6
LL	(Australia) T Fancutt	3	1

Quarterfinals
1	(Australia) R Hijikata	5	7^{7}	6
7	(Australia) O Jasika	7	6^{4}	3
4	(Australia) T Schoolkate	4	6	5
(Japan) M Imamura	6	3	7

Semifinals
1	(Australia) R Hijikata	5	6	6
(Japan) M Imamura	7	4	4

=== Bottom half ===
First round
8	(Australia) M Polmans	2	6	6
Q	(Georgia (country)) Z Tkemaladze	6	4	4
Q	(Japan) T Ichikawa	1	4
(Japan) Shintaro Imai	6	6
Q	(Japan) Ryuki Matsuda	3	6	6
(New Zealand) A Rai	6	2	2
(Georgia (country)) A Bakshi	5	3
3	(Japan) S Mochizuki	7	6
6	(Australia) L Tu	6	6
(Georgia (country)) S Purtseladze	1	3
(Australia) P Sekulic	6	6
(Belgium) T Colson	3	2
(Australia) B Mott	3	5
(Japan) Y Shimizu	6	7
(Japan) Hikaru Shiraishi	4	4
LL	(Japan) Yuki Mochizuki	6	6

Second round
8	(Australia) M Polmans	7^{9}	3	6
(Japan) S Imai	6^{7}	6	2
Q	(Japan) R Matsuda	4	2
3	(Japan) S Mochizuki	6	6
6	(Australia) L Tu	6	6
(Australia) P Sekulic	4	2
(Japan) Y Shimizu	7^{10}	6
LL	(Japan) Y Mochizuki	6^{8}	2

Quarterfinals
8	(Australia) M Polmans	2	6	6
3	(Japan) S Mochizuki	6	4	4
6	(Australia) L Tu	4	2
(Japan) Y Shimizu	6	6

Semifinals
8	(Australia) M Polmans	0	3
(Japan) Y Shimizu	6	6
