= 2024 City of Playford Tennis International =

- Date: 21–27 October
- Edition: 6th
- Category: ATP Challenger Tour; ITF Women's World Tennis Tour
- Surface: Hard / Outdoor
- Location: City of Playford, Australia

Champions

Men's singles
- (Australia) Rinky Hijikata

Women's singles
- (Australia) Maddison Inglis

Men's doubles
- (Australia) Blake Ellis / (Australia) Thomas Fancutt

Women's doubles
- (Australia) Alexandra Bozovic / (Australia) Petra Hule
- City of Playford Tennis International

The 2024 City of Playford Tennis International was a professional tennis tournament played on outdoor hard courts. It was the sixth edition of the tournament which was part of the 2024 ATP Challenger Tour and the 2024 ITF Women's World Tennis Tour. It took place in the City of Playford, Australia between 21 and 27 October 2024.

== Champions ==
=== Men's singles ===
- (Australia) Rinky Hijikata def. (Japan) Yuta Shimizu 6–4, 7–6^{(7–4)}.

=== Women's singles ===
- (Australia) Maddison Inglis vs. (Japan) Himeno Sakatsume

=== Men's doubles ===
- (Australia) Blake Ellis / (Australia) Thomas Fancutt def. (Australia) Jake Delaney / (Australia) Jesse Delaney 6–1, 5–7, [10–5].

=== Women's doubles ===
- (Australia) Alexandra Bozovic / (Australia) Petra Hule def. (Australia) Lizette Cabrera / (Australia) Taylah Preston 6–4, 6–3

== Men's singles main draw entrants ==
=== Seeds ===
Country	Player	Rank^{1}	Seed
AUS	Rinky Hijikata	79	1
~~AUS~~	~~Thanasi Kokkinakis~~	~~83~~	~~2~~
JPN	Shintaro Mochizuki	148	3
AUS	Tristan Schoolkate	174	4
~~AUS~~	~~Alex Bolt~~	~~178~~	~~5~~
AUS	Li Tu	181	6
AUS	Omar Jasika	191	7
AUS	Marc Polmans	247	8

- ^{1} Rankings are as of 14 October 2024.

=== Other entrants ===
The following players received wildcards into the singles main draw:

- (Australia) Moerani Bouzige
- (Australia) Jake Delaney
- (Australia) Edward Winter

The following players received entry from the qualifying draw:

- (United Kingdom) Emile Hudd
- (Japan) Taisei Ichikawa
- (Australia) Pavle Marinkov
- (Japan) Ryuki Matsuda
- (Northern Mariana Islands) Colin Sinclair
- (Georgia (country)) Zura Tkemaladze

The following players received entry as lucky losers:

- (Australia) Thomas Fancutt
- (Japan) Yuki Mochizuki

== Women's singles main draw entrants ==
=== Seeds ===
Country	Player	Rank^{1}	Seed
AUS	Talia Gibson	128	1
AUS	Taylah Preston	154	2
AUS	Maddison Inglis	186	3
AUS	Destanee Aiava	196	4
JPN	Himeno Sakatsume	298	5
IND	Shrivalli Bhamidipaty	316	6
AUS	Melisa Ercan	324	7
AUS	Petra Hule	326	8

- ^{1} Rankings are as of 14 October 2024.

=== Other entrants ===
The following players received wildcards into the singles main draw:

- (Australia) Alexandra Bozovic
- (Australia) Tenika McGiffin
- (Australia) Alicia Smith
- (Australia) Belle Thompson

The following players received entry from the qualifying draw:

- (Japan) Haruna Arakawa
- (New Zealand) Monique Barry
- (South Korea) Choi On-yu
- (Japan) Erina Hayashi
- (United States) Mia Horvit
- (Japan) Hayu Kinoshita
- (Japan) Chihiro Muramatsu
- (Chinese Taipei) Yang Ya-yi
