= 2023 City of Playford Tennis International =

- Date: 23–29 October
- Edition: 5th
- Category: ATP Challenger Tour; ITF Women's World Tennis Tour
- Surface: Hard / Outdoor
- Location: City of Playford, Australia

Champions

Men's singles
- (Australia) James Duckworth

Women's singles
- (Australia) Astra Sharma

Men's doubles
- (United States) Ryan Seggerman / (United States) Patrik Trhac

Women's doubles
- (Australia) Talia Gibson / (Australia) Priscilla Hon
- City of Playford Tennis International

The 2023 City of Playford Tennis International was a professional tennis tournament played on outdoor hard courts. It was the fifth edition of the tournament which was part of the 2023 ATP Challenger Tour and the 2023 ITF Women's World Tennis Tour. It took place in the City of Playford, Australia between 23 and 29 October 2023.

== Champions ==
=== Men's singles ===
- (Australia) James Duckworth def. (Hong Kong) Coleman Wong 7–5, 7–5.

=== Women's singles ===
- (Australia) Astra Sharma def. (Chinese Taipei) Joanna Garland, 7–6^{(8–6)}, 6–0

=== Men's doubles ===
- (United States) Ryan Seggerman / (United States) Patrik Trhac def. (Australia) Blake Ellis / (Australia) Tristan Schoolkate 6–3, 7–6^{(7–3)}.

=== Women's doubles ===
- (Australia) Talia Gibson / (Australia) Priscilla Hon def. (Australia) Kaylah McPhee / (Australia) Astra Sharma, 6–1, 6–2

== Men's singles main draw entrants ==
=== Seeds ===
| Country | Player | Rank^{1} | Seed |
|---|---|---|---|
| AUS | Thanasi Kokkinakis | 68 | 1 |
| AUS | Rinky Hijikata | 70 | 2 |
| JPN | Taro Daniel | 97 | 3 |
| AUS | James Duckworth | 144 | 4 |
| AUS | Marc Polmans | 151 | 5 |
| KOR | Hong Seong-chan | 197 | 6 |
| AUS | Dane Sweeny | 246 | 7 |
| AUS | Tristan Schoolkate | 247 | 8 |

- ^{1} Rankings are as of 16 October 2023.

=== Other entrants ===
The following players received wildcards into the singles main draw:

- (Australia) Matthew Dellavedova
- (Australia) Blake Mott
- (Australia) Zack Viiala

The following player received entry into the singles main draw as a special exempt:

- (Hong Kong) Coleman Wong

The following player received entry into the singles main draw as an alternate:

- (Australia) Blake Ellis

The following players received entry from the qualifying draw:

- (Australia) Jacob Bradshaw
- (Australia) Jayden Court
- (Australia) Pavle Marinkov
- (South Korea) Nam Ji-sung
- (Japan) Yusuke Takahashi
- (Germany) Kai Wehnelt

The following player received entry as a lucky loser:

- (New Zealand) Ajeet Rai

== Women's singles main draw entrants ==
=== Seeds ===
| Country | Player | Rank^{1} | Seed |
|---|---|---|---|
| AUS | Kimberly Birrell | 102 | 1 |
| KOR | Jang Su-jeong | 152 | 2 |
| AUS | Astra Sharma | 164 | 3 |
| JPN | Moyuka Uchijima | 183 | 4 |
| AUS | Priscilla Hon | 193 | 5 |
| AUS | Jaimee Fourlis | 207 | 6 |
| AUS | Destanee Aiava | 223 | 7 |
| CHN | Ma Yexin | 229 | 8 |

- ^{1} Rankings are as of 16 October 2023.

=== Other entrants ===
The following players received wildcards into the singles main draw:

- (Australia) Elysia Bolton
- (Australia) Gabriella Da Silva-Fick
- (Australia) Alana Parnaby
- (Australia) Ivana Popovic

The following players received entry from the qualifying draw:

- (Japan) Haruna Arakawa
- (Japan) Natsuho Arakawa
- (New Zealand) Monique Barry
- (Australia) Talia Gibson
- (Australia) Emerson Jones
- (United States) Lea Ma
- (Japan) Chihiro Muramatsu
- (Japan) Hikaru Sato
