= 2023 City of Playford Tennis International – Men's doubles =

Men's doubles
- 2023 City of Playford Tennis International

Final
- Champions: (United States) Ryan Seggerman (United States) Patrik Trhac
- Runners-up: (Australia) Blake Ellis (Australia) Tristan Schoolkate
- Score: 6–3, 7–6^{(7–3)}

Events
Singles	men	women
Doubles	men	women
- City of Playford Tennis International

Jeremy Beale and Calum Puttergill were the defending champions but only Puttergill chose to defend his title, partnering Ajeet Rai. Puttergill lost in the first round to Matthew Romios and Dane Sweeny.

Ryan Seggerman and Patrik Trhac won their first Challenger level title after defeating Blake Ellis and Tristan Schoolkate 6–3, 7–6^{(7–3)} in the final.

== Seeds ==
1. (Poland) Piotr Matuszewski / (Germany) Kai Wehnelt (semifinals)
2. (Australia) Rinky Hijikata / (United States) Mac Kiger (first round)
3. (Philippines) Ruben Gonzales / (South Korea) Nam Ji-sung (first round)
4. (Australia) Blake Ellis / (Australia) Tristan Schoolkate (final)

== Draw ==
Key

- Q = Qualifier
- WC = Wild card
- LL = Lucky loser
- Alt = Alternate
- ITF = ITF entry
- PR = Protected ranking
- SR = Special ranking
- SE = Special exempt
- JE = Junior exempt
- JR = Junior Accelerator Programme entrant
- CO = College Accelerator Programme entrant
- NG = Next Gen Accelerator Program entrant
- w/o = Walkover
- r = Retired
- d = Defaulted

First round
1	(Poland) P Matuszewski (Germany) K Wehnelt	6	6
(Australia) Jacob Bradshaw (Australia) M Hulme	4	4
(Australia) O Jasika (Japan) H Moriya	6^{5}	6	[8]
(Australia) B Bayldon (Australia) K Pearson	7^{7}	3	[10]
4	(Australia) B Ellis (Australia) T Schoolkate	7^{7}	6
(Australia) M Bouzige (Australia) B Mott	6^{4}	4
(Australia) MC Romios (Australia) D Sweeny	6	7^{7}
(Australia) C Puttergill (New Zealand) A Rai	4	6^{2}
(Japan) R Noguchi (France) A Weber	6	6
WC	(Australia) Jayden Court (Australia) Zaharije-Zak Talic	4	3
(South Korea) S-c Hong (Vietnam) NH Lý	6	6
3	(Philippines) R Gonzales (South Korea) J-s Nam	2	2
(Japan) K Uchida (Japan) Y Uchiyama	6	7^{7}
Alt	(Japan) Yuichiro Inui (Chinese Taipei) Yin Bang-shuo	4	6^{3}
(United States) R Seggerman (United States) P Trhac	2	6	[10]
2	(Australia) R Hijikata (United States) M Kiger	6	0	[5]

Quarterfinals
1	(Poland) P Matuszewski (Germany) K Wehnelt	6	7^{7}
(Australia) B Bayldon (Australia) K Pearson	2	6^{3}
4	(Australia) B Ellis (Australia) T Schoolkate	3	7^{7}	[10]
(Australia) MC Romios (Australia) D Sweeny	6	6^{2}	[7]
(Japan) R Noguchi (France) A Weber	7^{7}	6^{5}	[10]
(South Korea) S-c Hong (Vietnam) NH Lý	6^{5}	7^{7}	[7]
(Japan) K Uchida (Japan) Y Uchiyama
(United States) R Seggerman (United States) P Trhac	w/o

Semifinals
1	(Poland) P Matuszewski (Germany) K Wehnelt	3	4
4	(Australia) B Ellis (Australia) T Schoolkate	6	6
(Japan) R Noguchi (France) A Weber	3	3
(United States) R Seggerman (United States) P Trhac	6	6

Final
4	(Australia) B Ellis (Australia) T Schoolkate	3	6^{3}
(United States) R Seggerman (United States) P Trhac	6	7^{7}
