= 2024 City of Playford Tennis International – Men's doubles =

Men's doubles
- 2024 City of Playford Tennis International

Final
- Champions: (Australia) Blake Ellis (Australia) Thomas Fancutt
- Runners-up: (Australia) Jake Delaney (Australia) Jesse Delaney
- Score: 6–1, 5–7, [10–5]

Events
| Singles | men | women |
| Doubles | men | women |
- City of Playford Tennis International

Ryan Seggerman and Patrik Trhac were the defending champions but chose not to defend their title.

Blake Ellis and Thomas Fancutt won the title after defeating Jake and Jesse Delaney 6–1, 5–7, [10–5] in the final.

== Seeds ==
1. (Australia) Rinky Hijikata / (United States) Mac Kiger (quarterfinals)
2. (Australia) Blake Ellis / (Australia) Thomas Fancutt (champions)
3. (Japan) Seita Watanabe / (Japan) Takeru Yuzuki (semifinals)
4. (Australia) Tristan Schoolkate / (Australia) Li Tu (quarterfinals)

== Draw ==
Key

- Q = Qualifier
- WC = Wild card
- LL = Lucky loser
- Alt = Alternate
- ITF = ITF entry
- PR = Protected ranking
- SR = Special ranking
- SE = Special exempt
- JE = Junior exempt
- JR = Junior Accelerator Programme entrant
- CO = College Accelerator Programme entrant
- NG = Next Gen Accelerator Program entrant
- w/o = Walkover
- r = Retired
- d = Defaulted

=== Draw ===
First round
1 | (Australia) R Hijikata (United States) M Kiger | 5 | 6 | [11]
(Georgia (country)) A Bakshi (Netherlands) M Hermans | 7 | 3 | [9]
(Australia) J Charlton (United Kingdom) Emile Hudd | 6^{5} | 6 | [6]
(Australia) C Puttergill (Australia) D Sweeny | 7^{7} | 3 | [10]
4 | (Australia) T Schoolkate (Australia) L Tu | 7^{7} | 6
(New Zealand) A Rai (Australia) E Winter | 6^{5} | 4
WC | (Australia) M Bouzige (Australia) Thomas Braithwaite | 4 | 5
(Australia) Ja Delaney (Australia) Je Delaney | 6 | 7
(Japan) T Ichikawa (Japan) Ryuki Matsuda | 6^{2} | 3
(Australia) M Hulme (New Zealand) J Watt | 7^{7} | 6
WC | (Australia) Arjun Mehrotra (Australia) Hugh Winter | 1 | 4
3 | (Japan) S Watanabe (Japan) T Yuzuki | 6 | 6
(Kazakhstan) G Lomakin (Netherlands) T Loof | 6^{4} | 6 | [10]
(Australia) K Pearson (United States) J Sheehy | 7^{7} | 4 | [7]
Alt | (Japan) M Imamura (Japan) N Tajima | 6 | 1 | [8]
2 | (Australia) B Ellis (Australia) T Fancutt | 4 | 6 | [10]

Quarterfinals
1 | (Australia) R Hijikata (United States) M Kiger | 4 | 7^{7} | [14]
(Australia) C Puttergill (Australia) D Sweeny | 6 | 6^{4} | [16]
4 | (Australia) T Schoolkate (Australia) L Tu | 6 | 6^{5} | [8]
(Australia) Ja Delaney (Australia) Je Delaney | 1 | 7^{7} | [10]
(Australia) M Hulme (New Zealand) J Watt | 3 | 3
3 | (Japan) S Watanabe (Japan) T Yuzuki | 6 | 6
(Kazakhstan) G Lomakin (Netherlands) T Loof | 3 | 2
2 | (Australia) B Ellis (Australia) T Fancutt | 6 | 6

Semifinals
(Australia) C Puttergill (Australia) D Sweeny | 4 | 7 | [6]
(Australia) Ja Delaney (Australia) Je Delaney | 6 | 5 | [10]
3 | (Japan) S Watanabe (Japan) T Yuzuki | 6 | 2 | [7]
2 | (Australia) B Ellis (Australia) T Fancutt | 4 | 6 | [10]

Final
(Australia) Ja Delaney (Australia) Je Delaney | 1 | 7 | [5]
2 | (Australia) B Ellis (Australia) T Fancutt | 6 | 5 | [10]
