= 2024 NSW Open – Men's singles =

Men's singles
- 2024 NSW Open

Final
- Champion: (Australia) Thanasi Kokkinakis
- Runner-up: (Australia) Rinky Hijikata
- Score: 6–1, 6–1

Events
Singles	men	women
Doubles	men	women
← 2023 ·	NSW Open	· 2025 →

Taro Daniel was the defending champion but chose not to defend his title.

Thanasi Kokkinakis won the title after defeating Rinky Hijikata 6–1, 6–1 in the final.

== Seeds ==
1. (Australia) Rinky Hijikata (final)
2. (Australia) Thanasi Kokkinakis (champion)
3. (Australia) Tristan Schoolkate (semifinals)
4. (Australia) Alex Bolt (first round)
5. (Australia) Omar Jasika (quarterfinals)
6. (Australia) Marc Polmans (second round)
7. (Japan) Shintaro Mochizuki (first round)
8. (Japan) Yuta Shimizu (semifinals)

== Draw ==
Key

- Q = Qualifier
- WC = Wild card
- LL = Lucky loser
- Alt = Alternate
- ITF = ITF entry
- PR = Protected ranking
- SR = Special ranking
- SE = Special exempt
- JE = Junior exempt
- JR = Junior Accelerator Programme entrant
- CO = College Accelerator Programme entrant
- NG = Next Gen Accelerator Program entrant
- w/o = Walkover
- r = Retired
- d = Defaulted

=== Finals ===
Semifinals
1	(Australia) Rinky Hijikata	7^{7}	6
8	(Japan) Yuta Shimizu	6^{1}	3
3	(Australia) Tristan Schoolkate	4	6^{3}
2	(Australia) Thanasi Kokkinakis	6	7^{7}

Final
1	(Australia) Rinky Hijikata	1	1
2	(Australia) Thanasi Kokkinakis	6	6

=== Top half ===
First round
1	(Australia) R Hijikata	7^{7}	6^{5}	6
Q	(Japan) Ryuki Matsuda	6^{5}	7^{7}	4
(Japan) M Imamura	6	7^{7}
WC	(Australia) H Jones	3	6^{3}
LL	(United Kingdom) Emile Hudd	6	6
(Australia) D Sweeny	2	2
(Australia) Matthew Dellavedova	6	6
7	(Japan) S Mochizuki	1	2
4	(Australia) A Bolt	5	5
(New Zealand) A Rai	7	7
Q	(Georgia (country)) A Bakshi	4	2
Q	(Japan) Yuki Mochizuki	6	6
Q	(Japan) S Watanabe	5	7^{7}	3
(Australia) B Mott	7	6^{5}	6
(Australia) Jacob Bradshaw	3	3
8	(Japan) Y Shimizu	6	6

Second round
1	(Australia) R Hijikata	6	7^{7}
(Japan) M Imamura	3	6^{3}
LL	(United Kingdom) E Hudd	6^{2}	7	6
(Australia) M Dellavedova	7^{7}	5	2
(New Zealand) A Rai	7^{7}	2	7^{7}
Q	(Japan) Y Mochizuki	6^{2}	6	6^{3}
(Australia) B Mott	1	7	3
8	(Japan) Y Shimizu	6	5	6

Quarterfinals
1	(Australia) R Hijikata	6	6
LL	(United Kingdom) E Hudd	3	1
(New Zealand) A Rai	1	4
8	(Japan) Y Shimizu	6	6

Semifinals
1	(Australia) R Hijikata	7^{7}	6
8	(Japan) Y Shimizu	6^{1}	3

=== Bottom half ===
First round
5	(Australia) O Jasika	6	5	7
Q	(Japan) Takuya Kumasaka	2	7	5
(Australia) B Ellis	6^{2}	7	6
(Australia) J McCabe	7^{7}	5	3
(Belgium) T Colson	6	3	6
(Japan) Shintaro Imai	3	6	2
(Australia) Ja Delaney	6^{4}	3
3	(Australia) T Schoolkate	7^{7}	6
6	(Australia) M Polmans	6	6
WC	(Australia) E Winter	2	2
(Japan) Hikaru Shiraishi	6	6
WC	(Australia) M Bouzige	2	4
(Australia) P Sekulic	6	5	6
Q	(Australia) Pavle Marinkov	2	7	1
(United States) Christian Langmo	3	4
2	(Australia) T Kokkinakis	6	6

Second round
5	(Australia) O Jasika	7	6
(Australia) B Ellis	5	1
(Belgium) T Colson	2	3
3	(Australia) T Schoolkate	6	6
6	(Australia) M Polmans	6	1	2
(Japan) H Shiraishi	3	6	6
(Australia) P Sekulic	2	6^{4}
2	(Australia) T Kokkinakis	6	7^{7}

Quarterfinals
5	(Australia) O Jasika	2	7^{7}	6^{7}
3	(Australia) T Schoolkate	6	6^{5}	7^{9}
(Japan) H Shiraishi	2	1
2	(Australia) T Kokkinakis	6	6

Semifinals
3	(Australia) T Schoolkate	4	6^{3}
2	(Australia) T Kokkinakis	6	7^{7}
