= 2024 NSW Open – Men's doubles =

Men's doubles
- 2024 NSW Open

Final
- Champions: (Australia) Blake Ellis (Australia) Thomas Fancutt
- Runners-up: (Australia) Blake Bayldon (Netherlands) Mats Hermans
- Score: 7–5, 7–6^{(7–4)}

Events
Singles	men	women
Doubles	men	women
- NSW Open

Ryan Seggerman and Patrik Trhac were the defending champions but chose not to defend their title.

Blake Ellis and Thomas Fancutt won the title after defeating Blake Bayldon and Mats Hermans 7–5, 7–6^{(7–4)} in the final.

== Seeds ==
1. (Australia) Rinky Hijikata / (United States) Mac Kiger (quarterfinals)
2. (Australia) Blake Ellis / (Australia) Thomas Fancutt (champions)
3. (Japan) Seita Watanabe / (Japan) Takeru Yuzuki (quarterfinals)
4. (Australia) Kody Pearson / (United States) Joshua Sheehy (semifinals)

== Draw ==
Key

- Q = Qualifier
- WC = Wild card
- LL = Lucky loser
- Alt = Alternate
- ITF = ITF entry
- PR = Protected ranking
- SR = Special ranking
- SE = Special exempt
- JE = Junior exempt
- JR = Junior Accelerator Programme entrant
- CO = College Accelerator Programme entrant
- NG = Next Gen Accelerator Program entrant
- w/o = Walkover
- r = Retired
- d = Defaulted

=== Draw ===
First round
1	(Australia) R Hijikata (United States) M Kiger	6	6
(Australia) J Charlton (United Kingdom) Emile Hudd	4	4
(Australia) B Bayldon (Netherlands) M Hermans	6	6
(Georgia (country)) A Bakshi (Belgium) T Colson	4	2
4	(Australia) K Pearson (United States) J Sheehy	6	6^{5}	[10]
(Australia) M Bouzige (Australia) Ethan Cook	2	7^{7}	[7]
(Australia) C Puttergill (Australia) D Sweeny	4	2
(Japan) M Imamura (Japan) N Tajima	6	6
(Northern Mariana Islands) C Sinclair (New Zealand) J Watt	3	7^{7}	[8]
(Japan) Ryuki Matsuda (Australia) A Taylor	6	6^{5}	[10]
(New Zealand) A Rai (Australia) E Winter	4	6	[3]
3	(Japan) S Watanabe (Japan) T Yuzuki	6	4	[10]
(Australia) Ja Delaney (Australia) Je Delaney	7^{7}	2	[4]
(Australia) C Hewitt (Australia) M Polmans	6^{2}	6	[10]
Alt	(Japan) T Ichikawa (Japan) Hikaru Shiraishi	7	5	[4]
2	(Australia) B Ellis (Australia) T Fancutt	5	7	[10]

Quarterfinals
1	(Australia) R Hijikata (United States) M Kiger	1	6^{5}
(Australia) B Bayldon (Netherlands) M Hermans	6	7^{7}
4	(Australia) K Pearson (United States) J Sheehy	7^{9}	6
(Japan) M Imamura (Japan) N Tajima	6^{7}	1
(Japan) R Matsuda (Australia) A Taylor	6	7^{7}
3	(Japan) S Watanabe (Japan) T Yuzuki	3	6^{5}
(Australia) C Hewitt (Australia) M Polmans	4	4
2	(Australia) B Ellis (Australia) T Fancutt	6	6

Semifinals
(Australia) B Bayldon (Netherlands) M Hermans	6	7^{7}
4	(Australia) K Pearson (United States) J Sheehy	3	6^{3}
(Japan) R Matsuda (Australia) A Taylor	3	4
2	(Australia) B Ellis (Australia) T Fancutt	6	6

Final
(Australia) B Bayldon (Netherlands) M Hermans	5	6^{4}
2	(Australia) B Ellis (Australia) T Fancutt	7	7^{7}
