= 2024 NSW Open =

- Date: 28 October–3 November
- Edition: 4th (men); 10th (women)
- Category: ATP Challenger Tour; ITF Women's World Tennis Tour
- Surface: Hard / Outdoor
- Location: Sydney, Australia

Champions

Men's singles
- (Australia) Thanasi Kokkinakis

Women's singles
- (Australia) Emerson Jones

Men's doubles
- (Australia) Blake Ellis / (Australia) Thomas Fancutt

Women's doubles
- (Australia) Lizette Cabrera / (Australia) Taylah Preston
- NSW Open

The 2024 Perpetual NSW Open was a professional tennis tournament played on outdoor hard courts. It was the fourth edition of the tournament which was part of the 2024 ATP Challenger Tour and the tenth edition of the tournament which was part of the 2024 ITF Women's World Tennis Tour. It took place in Sydney, Australia between 28 October and 3 November 2024.

== Champions ==
=== Men's singles ===
- (Australia) Thanasi Kokkinakis def. (Australia) Rinky Hijikata 6–1, 6–1.

=== Women's singles ===
- (Australia) Emerson Jones def. (Australia) Taylah Preston 6–4, 7–6^{(7–3)}

=== Men's doubles ===
- (Australia) Blake Ellis / (Australia) Thomas Fancutt def. (Australia) Blake Bayldon / (Netherlands) Mats Hermans 7–5, 7–6^{(7–4)}.

=== Women's doubles ===
- (Australia) Lizette Cabrera / (Australia) Taylah Preston def. (Australia) Destanee Aiava / (Australia) Maddison Inglis 6–1, 3–6, [10–8]

== Men's singles main draw entrants ==
=== Seeds ===
Country	Player	Rank^{1}	Seed
AUS	Rinky Hijikata	83	1
AUS	Thanasi Kokkinakis	85	2
AUS	Tristan Schoolkate	176	3
AUS	Alex Bolt	180	4
AUS	Omar Jasika	193	5
AUS	Marc Polmans	231	6
JPN	Shintaro Mochizuki	245	7
JPN	Yuta Shimizu	247	8

- ^{1} Rankings are as of 21 October 2024.

=== Other entrants ===
The following players received wildcards into the singles main draw:

- (Australia) Moerani Bouzige
- (Australia) Hayden Jones
- (Australia) Edward Winter

The following players received entry from the qualifying draw:

- (Georgia (country)) Aleksandre Bakshi
- (Japan) Takuya Kumasaka
- (Australia) Pavle Marinkov
- (Japan) Ryuki Matsuda
- (Japan) Yuki Mochizuki
- (Japan) Seita Watanabe

The following player received entry as a lucky loser:

- (United Kingdom) Emile Hudd

== Women's singles main draw entrants ==
=== Seeds ===
Country	Player	Rank^{1}	Seed
AUS	Talia Gibson	129	1
AUS	Taylah Preston	162	2
AUS	Maddison Inglis	174	3
AUS	Destanee Aiava	186	4
~~JPN~~	~~Himeno Sakatsume~~	~~297~~	~~5~~
IND	Shrivalli Bhamidipaty	303	6
AUS	Petra Hule	317	7
JPN	Naho Sato	319	8

- ^{1} Rankings are as of 21 October 2024.

=== Other entrants ===
The following players received wildcards into the singles main draw:

- (Australia) Destanee Aiava
- (Australia) Emerson Jones
- (Australia) Tahlia Kokkinis
- (Australia) Alana Subasic

The following players received entry from the qualifying draw:

- (Australia) Alexandra Bozovic
- (South Korea) Choi On-yu
- (Japan) Nagi Hanatani
- (Japan) Erina Hayashi
- (Netherlands) Merel Hoedt
- (Japan) Nana Kawagishi
- (Japan) Natsumi Kawaguchi
- (Japan) Yukina Saigo

The following players received entry as lucky losers:

- (New Zealand) Monique Barry
- (Australia) Sarah Rokusek
