= 2023 City of Playford Tennis International – Men's singles =

Men's singles
- 2023 City of Playford Tennis International

Final
- Champion: (Australia) James Duckworth
- Runner-up: (Hong Kong) Coleman Wong
- Score: 7–5, 7–5

Events
Singles	men	women
Doubles	men	women
- City of Playford Tennis International

Rinky Hijikata was the defending champion but lost in the semifinals to James Duckworth.

Duckworth won the title after defeating Coleman Wong 7–5, 7–5 in the final.

== Seeds ==
1. (Australia) Thanasi Kokkinakis (second round, retired)
2. (Australia) Rinky Hijikata (semifinals)
3. (Japan) Taro Daniel (semifinals)
4. (Australia) James Duckworth (champion)
5. (Australia) Marc Polmans (second round)
6. (South Korea) Hong Seong-chan (quarterfinals)
7. (Australia) Dane Sweeny (first round)
8. (Australia) Tristan Schoolkate (quarterfinals)

== Draw ==
Key

- Q = Qualifier
- WC = Wild card
- LL = Lucky loser
- Alt = Alternate
- ITF = ITF entry
- PR = Protected ranking
- SR = Special ranking
- SE = Special exempt
- JE = Junior exempt
- JR = Junior Accelerator Programme entrant
- CO = College Accelerator Programme entrant
- NG = Next Gen Accelerator Program entrant
- w/o = Walkover
- r = Retired
- d = Defaulted

=== Finals ===
Semifinals
SE	(Hong Kong) Coleman Wong	4	7^{7}	7
3	(Japan) Taro Daniel	6	6^{5}	5
4	(Australia) James Duckworth	4	7	6
2	(Australia) Rinky Hijikata	6	5	1

Final
SE	(Hong Kong) Coleman Wong	5	5
4	(Australia) James Duckworth	7	7

=== Top half ===
First round
1	(Australia) T Kokkinakis	6^{7}	6	6
Q	(Japan) Y Takahashi	7^{9}	3	2
LL	(New Zealand) A Rai	6	2	2
SE	(Hong Kong) C Wong	3	6	6
(Vietnam) NH Lý	6	6
WC	(Australia) Matthew Dellavedova	4	3
Q	(Australia) Pavle Marinkov	3	4
8	(Australia) T Schoolkate	6	6
3	(Japan) T Daniel	6	6
Q	(Australia) Jacob Bradshaw	3	1
(Australia) L Tu	7	6
WC	(Australia) Zack Viiala	5	2
Q	(Germany) K Wehnelt	4	4
(Japan) Y Shimizu	6	6
(Poland) F Peliwo	4	0
5	(Australia) M Polmans	6	6

Second round
1	(Australia) T Kokkinakis	6^{1}	0^{r}
SE	(Hong Kong) C Wong	7^{7}	2
(Vietnam) NH Lý	6	4	2
8	(Australia) T Schoolkate	3	6	6
3	(Japan) T Daniel	6	6
(Australia) L Tu	1	2
(Japan) Y Shimizu	6	6
5	(Australia) M Polmans	4	2

Quarterfinals
SE	(Hong Kong) C Wong	6^{7}	7^{7}	7^{7}
8	(Australia) T Schoolkate	7^{9}	6^{3}	6^{2}
3	(Japan) T Daniel	6	6
(Japan) Y Shimizu	1	2

Semifinals
SE	(Hong Kong) C Wong	4	7^{7}	7
3	(Japan) T Daniel	6	6^{5}	5

=== Bottom half ===
First round
7	(Australia) D Sweeny	6^{5}	2
(Japan) H Moriya	7^{7}	6
(France) A Weber	1	2
(Japan) R Noguchi	6	6
Alt	(Australia) B Ellis	3	5
(Australia) P Sekulic	6	7
(Japan) K Uchida	4	6^{2}
4	(Australia) J Duckworth	6	7^{7}
6	(South Korea) S-c Hong	7^{9}	6
Q	(Australia) Jayden Court	6^{7}	3
WC	(Australia) B Mott	7	1	3
(Japan) N Nakagawa	5	6	6
(Australia) O Jasika	3	2
(Japan) Y Uchiyama	6	6
Q	(South Korea) J-s Nam	4	6^{4}
2	(Australia) R Hijikata	6	7^{7}

Second round
(Japan) H Moriya	7	4	6
(Japan) R Noguchi	5	6	2
(Australia) P Sekulic	5	1
4	(Australia) J Duckworth	7	6
6	(South Korea) S-c Hong	6	6
(Japan) N Nakagawa	3	3
(Japan) Y Uchiyama	2	5
2	(Australia) R Hijikata	6	7

Quarterfinals
(Japan) H Moriya	6	2	4
4	(Australia) J Duckworth	4	6	6
6	(South Korea) S-c Hong	1	1
2	(Australia) R Hijikata	6	6

Semifinals
4	(Australia) J Duckworth	4	7	6
2	(Australia) R Hijikata	6	5	1
