= 2024 NSW Open – Women's singles =

Women's singles
- 2024 NSW Open

Final
- Champion: (Australia) Emerson Jones
- Runner-up: (Australia) Taylah Preston
- Score: 6–4, 7–6^{(7–3)}

Events
Singles	men	women
Doubles	men	women
← 2023 ·	NSW Open	· 2025 →

Destanee Aiava was the defending champion but lost to Emerson Jones in the second round.

Jones went on to win the title, defeating Taylah Preston in the final, 6–4, 7–6^{(7–3)}.

== Seeds ==
1. (Australia) Talia Gibson (semifinals)
2. (Australia) Taylah Preston (final)
3. (Australia) Maddison Inglis (first round, retired)
4. (Australia) Destanee Aiava (second round)
5. (Japan) Himeno Sakatsume (withdrew)
6. (India) Shrivalli Bhamidipaty (first round)
7. (Australia) Petra Hule (quarterfinals)
8. (Japan) Naho Sato (first round)

== Draw ==
=== Key ===
- Q = Qualifier
- WC = Wild card
- LL = Lucky loser
- Alt = Alternate
- SE = Special exempt
- PR = Protected ranking
- ITF = ITF entry
- JE = Junior exempt
- w/o = Walkover
- r = Retired
- d = Defaulted
- SR = Special ranking

=== Finals ===
Semifinals
1	(Australia) Talia Gibson	6	4	2
WC	(Australia) Emerson Jones	2	6	6
(Japan) Hikaru Sato	2	4
2	(Australia) Taylah Preston	6	6

Final
WC	(Australia) Emerson Jones	6	7^{7}
2	(Australia) Taylah Preston	4	6^{3}

=== Top half ===
First round
1	(Australia) T Gibson	6	7
WC	(Australia) A Subasic	4	5
(Japan) H Arakawa	7^{8}	7
LL	(New Zealand) M Barry	6^{6}	5
(Japan) S Imamura	6	6
Q	(Japan) E Hayashi	0	0
(Japan) S Hosogi	4	6^{3}
7	(Australia) P Hule	6	7^{7}
4/WC	(Australia) D Aiava	6	6^{5}	6
(Australia) M Ercan	0	7^{7}	3
(Australia) L Cabrera	1	1
WC	(Australia) E Jones	6	6
(Japan) Y Naito	6^{5}	6	6
Q	(Japan) N Kawagishi	7^{7}	4	2
(Australia) G Da Silva-Fick	7	6
6	(India) S Bhamidipaty	5	3

Second round
1	(Australia) T Gibson	6	6
(Japan) H Arakawa	1	4
(Japan) S Imamura	2	0
7	(Australia) P Hule	6	6
4/WC	(Australia) D Aiava	4	2
WC	(Australia) E Jones	6	6
(Japan) Y Naito	5	3
(Australia) G Da Silva-Fick	6	6

Quarterfinals
1	(Australia) T Gibson	7	4	6
7	(Australia) P Hule	5	6	3
WC	(Australia) E Jones	6	7
(Australia) G Da Silva-Fick	2	5

Semifinals
1	(Australia) T Gibson	6	4	2
WC	(Australia) E Jones	2	6	6

=== Bottom half ===
First round
8	(Japan) N Sato	6	2	2
(Japan) H Sato	1	6	6
WC	(Australia) T Kokkinis	6	7
Q	(Netherlands) M Hoedt	4	5
(Slovakia) N Vargová	7	4	6
Q	(South Korea) O-y Choi	5	6	2
Q	(Japan) N Hanatani	7	0
3	(Australia) M Inglis	5	0^{r}
LL	(Australia) S Rokusek	5	4
(Japan) E Sema	7	6
Q	(Japan) Y Saigo	4	2
(India) V Chaudhari	6	6
Q	(Australia) A Bozovic	6	1	7^{7}
Q	(Japan) N Kawaguchi	4	6	6^{5}
(Japan) R Saigo	6^{3}	6^{4}
2	(Australia) T Preston	7^{7}	7^{7}

Second round
(Japan) H Sato	4	6	6
WC	(Australia) T Kokkinis	6	4	0
(Slovakia) N Vargová	6	6
Q	(Japan) N Hanatani	1	2
(Japan) E Sema	6^{5}	7^{7}	7^{7}
(India) V Chaudhari	7^{7}	6^{3}	6^{1}
Q	(Australia) A Bozovic	4	4
2	(Australia) T Preston	6	6

Quarterfinals
(Japan) H Sato	4	6	6
(Slovakia) N Vargová	6	3	4
(Japan) E Sema	3	4
2	(Australia) T Preston	6	6

Semifinals
(Japan) H Sato	2	4
2	(Australia) T Preston	6	6
