= 2024 City of Playford Tennis International – Women's singles =

Women's singles
- 2024 City of Playford Tennis International

Final
- Champion: (Australia) Maddison Inglis
- Runner-up: (Japan) Himeno Sakatsume
- Score: 7–6^{(9–7)}, 5–7, 6–1

Events
Singles	men	women
Doubles	men	women
← 2023 ·	City of Playford Tennis International	· 2025 →

Astra Sharma was the defending champion, but chose not to participate.

Maddison Inglis won the title, defeating Himeno Sakatsume in the final; 7–6^{(9–7)}, 5–7, 6–1.

== Seeds ==
1. (Australia) Talia Gibson (semifinals)
2. (Australia) Taylah Preston (semifinals)
3. (Australia) Maddison Inglis (champion)
4. (Australia) Destanee Aiava (quarterfinals)
5. (Japan) Himeno Sakatsume (final)
6. (India) Shrivalli Bhamidipaty (quarterfinals)
7. (Australia) Melisa Ercan (second round)
8. (Australia) Petra Hule (quarterfinals)

== Draw ==
=== Key ===
- Q = Qualifier
- WC = Wild card
- LL = Lucky loser
- Alt = Alternate
- SE = Special exempt
- PR = Protected ranking
- ITF = ITF entry
- JE = Junior exempt
- w/o = Walkover
- r = Retired
- d = Defaulted
- SR = Special ranking

=== Finals ===
Semifinals
1	(Australia) Talia Gibson	4	4
3	(Australia) Maddison Inglis	6	6
5	(Japan) Himeno Sakatsume	6	7^{7}
2	(Australia) Taylah Preston	1	6^{4}

Final
3	(Australia) Maddison Inglis	7^{9}	5	6
5	(Japan) Himeno Sakatsume	6^{7}	7	1

=== Top half ===
First round
1	(Australia) T Gibson	6^{4}	6	6
(Japan) Y Naito	7^{7}	3	4
(Australia) E Micic	6	6
Q	(Japan) H Arakawa	3	2
(Japan) R Saigo	3	6	1
(Australia) G Da Silva-Fick	6	3	6
Q	(Japan) E Hayashi	6^{2}	3
6	(India) S Bhamidipaty	7^{7}	6
3	(Australia) M Inglis	6	6
Q	(Japan) C Muramatsu	2	3
(Japan) E Sema	7	6
Q	(Chinese Taipei) Y-y Yang	5	1
(Japan) S Hosogi	6	6
(Japan) H Sato	4	2
(India) V Chaudhari	6	4	4
7	(Australia) M Ercan	2	6	6

Second round
1	(Australia) T Gibson	6	6
(Australia) E Micic	2	4
(Australia) G Da Silva-Fick	4	1
6	(India) S Bhamidipaty	6	6
3	(Australia) M Inglis	6	6
(Japan) E Sema	1	1
(Japan) S Hosogi	3	6	6
7	(Australia) M Ercan	6	1	0

Quarterfinals
1	(Australia) T Gibson	7	6
6	(India) S Bhamidipaty	5	0
3	(Australia) M Inglis	6	6
(Japan) S Hosogi	0	1

Semifinals
1	(Australia) T Gibson	4	4
3	(Australia) M Inglis	6	6

=== Bottom half ===
First round
5	(Japan) H Sakatsume	2	6	6
Q	(Japan) H Kinoshita	6	3	1
Q	(United States) M Horvit	6	6
WC	(Australia) A Smith	4	2
(Australia) L Cabrera	6	4	1
WC	(Australia) A Bozovic	1	6	6
(Slovakia) N Vargová	3	4
4	(Australia) D Aiava	6	6
8	(Australia) P Hule	6	6
(Japan) S Imamura	1	3
WC	(Australia) B Thompson	6	7
Q	(New Zealand) M Barry	4	5
WC	(Australia) T McGiffin	7	3	1
(Japan) N Sato	5	6	6
Q	(South Korea) O-y Choi	2	2
2	(Australia) T Preston	6	6

Second round
5	(Japan) H Sakatsume	6	7
Q	(United States) M Horvit	0	5
WC	(Australia) A Bozovic	1	4
4	(Australia) D Aiava	6	6
8	(Australia) P Hule	6	6
WC	(Australia) B Thompson	4	1
(Japan) N Sato	1	2
2	(Australia) T Preston	6	6

Quarterfinals
5	(Japan) H Sakatsume	6	6
4	(Australia) D Aiava	3	3
8	(Australia) P Hule	6^{3}	6	4
2	(Australia) T Preston	7^{7}	3	6

Semifinals
5	(Japan) H Sakatsume	6	7^{7}
2	(Australia) T Preston	1	6^{4}
