= 2023 City of Playford Tennis International – Women's singles =

Women's singles
- 2023 City of Playford Tennis International

Final
- Champion: (Australia) Astra Sharma
- Runner-up: (Chinese Taipei) Joanna Garland
- Score: 7–6^{(8–6)}, 6–0

Events
Singles	men	women
Doubles	men	women
← 2022 ·	City of Playford Tennis International	· 2024 →

Kimberly Birrell was the defending champion, but retired against Taylah Preston in the quarterfinals.

Astra Sharma won the title, defeating Joanna Garland in the final, 7–6^{(8–6)}, 6–0.

== Seeds ==
1. (Australia) Kimberly Birrell (quarterfinals, retired)
2. (South Korea) Jang Su-jeong (first round)
3. (Australia) Astra Sharma (champion)
4. (Japan) Moyuka Uchijima (first round)
5. (Australia) Priscilla Hon (second round)
6. (Australia) Jaimee Fourlis (quarterfinals)
7. (Australia) Destanee Aiava (first round)
8. (China) Ma Yexin (semifinals)

== Draw ==
=== Key ===
- Q = Qualifier
- WC = Wild card
- LL = Lucky loser
- Alt = Alternate
- SE = Special exempt
- PR = Protected ranking
- ITF = ITF entry
- JE = Junior exempt
- w/o = Walkover
- r = Retired
- d = Defaulted
- SR = Special ranking

=== Finals ===
Semifinals
(Australia) Taylah Preston	2	3
3	(Australia) Astra Sharma	6	6
8	(China) Ma Yexin	3	2
(Chinese Taipei) Joanna Garland	6	6

Final
3	(Australia) Astra Sharma	7^{8}	6
(Chinese Taipei) Joanna Garland	6^{6}	0

=== Top half ===
First round
1	(Australia) K Birrell	6	6
WC	(Australia) E Bolton	1	2
Q	(United States) L Ma	2	4
Q	(Australia) T Gibson	6	6
(Australia) T Preston	7^{7}	7
Q	(Japan) H Sato	6^{4}	5
(Australia) K McPhee	4	2
5	(Australia) P Hon	6	6
3	(Australia) A Sharma	6	7^{8}
(Japan) K Okamura	4	6^{6}
Q	(Japan) N Arakawa	2	3
Q	(Japan) H Arakawa	6	6
(Czech Republic) M Bayerlová	2	7^{7}	1
WC	(Australia) A Parnaby	6	6^{4}	6
(Japan) N Kawaguchi	6	5	1
6	(Australia) J Fourlis	3	7	6

Second round
1	(Australia) K Birrell	3	6	6
Q	(Australia) T Gibson	6	3	1
(Australia) T Preston	4	6	6
5	(Australia) P Hon	6	3	3
3	(Australia) A Sharma	6	6
Q	(Japan) H Arakawa	4	0
WC	(Australia) A Parnaby	4	2
6	(Australia) J Fourlis	6	6

Quarterfinals
1	(Australia) K Birrell	6	6^{2}	1^{r}
(Australia) T Preston	4	7^{7}	4
3	(Australia) A Sharma	6	6
6	(Australia) J Fourlis	1	1

Semifinals
(Australia) T Preston	2	3
3	(Australia) A Sharma	6	6

=== Bottom half ===
First round
8	(China) Y Ma	7^{7}	6
(Japan) A Shimizu	6^{4}	0
(Japan) Y Naito	4	7	0
(Japan) S Hosogi	6	5	6
WC	(Australia) I Popovic	6	7
Q	(New Zealand) M Barry	2	5
Q	(Japan) C Muramatsu	6	2	6
4	(Japan) M Uchijima	4	6	4
7	(Australia) D Aiava	2	6	4
(Australia) M Inglis	6	3	6
(Chinese Taipei) J Garland	7^{7}	6
(Thailand) L Tararudee	6^{4}	4
WC	(Australia) G Da Silva-Fick	4	0
Q	(Australia) E Jones	6	6
(Australia) S Mendez	6	6
2	(South Korea) S-j Jang	4	3

Second round
8	(China) Y Ma	5	6	6
(Japan) S Hosogi	7	1	4
WC	(Australia) I Popovic	2	4
Q	(Japan) C Muramatsu	6	6
(Australia) M Inglis	3	4
(Chinese Taipei) J Garland	6	6
Q	(Australia) E Jones	2	4
(Australia) S Mendez	6	6

Quarterfinals
8	(China) Y Ma	6	6
Q	(Japan) C Muramatsu	1	4
(Chinese Taipei) J Garland	7	7
(Australia) S Mendez	5	5

Semifinals
8	(China) Y Ma	3	2
(Chinese Taipei) J Garland	6	6
