= 2023 Cary Challenger II – Doubles =

Doubles
- 2023 Cary Challenger II

Final
- Champions: (Australia) Andrew Harris (Australia) Rinky Hijikata
- Runners-up: (United States) William Blumberg (Venezuela) Luis David Martínez
- Score: 6–4, 3–6, [10–6]

Events
Singles	Doubles
- Cary Challenger

Evan King and Reese Stalder were the defending champions but chose not to defend their title.

Andrew Harris and Rinky Hijikata won the title after defeating William Blumberg and Luis David Martínez 6–4, 3–6, [10–6] in the final.

== Seeds ==
1. (Australia) Andrew Harris / (Australia) Rinky Hijikata (champions)
2. (United States) William Blumberg / (Venezuela) Luis David Martínez (final)
3. (Argentina) Guido Andreozzi / (Mexico) Hans Hach Verdugo (first round)
4. (Australia) Tristan Schoolkate / (Australia) Adam Walton (first round)

== Draw ==
Key

- Q = Qualifier
- WC = Wild card
- LL = Lucky loser
- Alt = Alternate
- ITF = ITF entry
- PR = Protected ranking
- SR = Special ranking
- SE = Special exempt
- JE = Junior exempt
- JR = Junior Accelerator Programme entrant
- CO = College Accelerator Programme entrant
- NG = Next Gen Accelerator Program entrant
- w/o = Walkover
- r = Retired
- d = Defaulted

First round
1	(Australia) A Harris (Australia) R Hijikata	3	6	[10]
(United States) C Kingsley (United States) E Quinn	6	3	[8]
(United States) M Kiger (United States) M Krueger	3	6^{4}
(United States) G Goldhoff (United States) A Perez	6	7^{7}
4	(Australia) T Schoolkate (Australia) A Walton	6	3	[8]
Alt	(United States) G Johns (Spain) Pedro Ródenas	3	6	[10]
(Australia) C Puttergill (Australia) A Taylor	4	7^{7}	[7]
(United States) C Harrison (United States) V Kirkov	6	6^{3}	[10]
WC	(United Kingdom) William Jansen (United States) K Poling	6	6
(Argentina) JP Ficovich (Argentina) FA Gómez	3	4
(United Kingdom) T Samuel (United Kingdom) C Thomson	6	6
3	(Argentina) G Andreozzi (Mexico) H Hach Verdugo	4	4
WC	(United States) Nathan Ponwith (United States) A Rybakov	6^{0}	4
(United States) A Lawson (Finland) E Vasa	7^{7}	6
(United States) Colin Markes (Canada) B Sigouin	3	3
2	(United States) W Blumberg (Venezuela) LD Martínez	6	6

Quarterfinals
1	(Australia) A Harris (Australia) R Hijikata	6	6
(United States) G Goldhoff (United States) A Perez	3	4
Alt	(United States) G Johns (Spain) P Ródenas	7^{8}	5	[8]
(United States) C Harrison (United States) V Kirkov	6^{6}	7	[10]
WC	(United Kingdom) W Jansen (United States) K Poling	3	6	[4]
(United Kingdom) T Samuel (United Kingdom) C Thomson	6	3	[10]
(United States) A Lawson (Finland) E Vasa	3	0
2	(United States) W Blumberg (Venezuela) LD Martínez	6	6

Semifinals
1	(Australia) A Harris (Australia) R Hijikata	6	3	[10]
(United States) C Harrison (United States) V Kirkov	3	6	[8]
(United Kingdom) T Samuel (United Kingdom) C Thomson	6^{3}	4
2	(United States) W Blumberg (Venezuela) LD Martínez	7^{7}	6

Final
1	(Australia) A Harris (Australia) R Hijikata	6	3	[10]
2	(United States) W Blumberg (Venezuela) LD Martínez	4	6	[6]
