= 2024 City of Playford Tennis International – Women's doubles =

Women's doubles
- 2024 City of Playford Tennis International

Final
- Champions: (Australia) Alexandra Bozovic (Australia) Petra Hule
- Runners-up: (Australia) Lizette Cabrera (Australia) Taylah Preston
- Score: 6–4, 6–3

Events
Singles	men	women
Doubles	men	women
← 2023 ·	City of Playford Tennis International	· 2025 →

Talia Gibson and Priscilla Hon were the defending champions but chose not to participate.

Alexandra Bozovic and Petra Hule won the title, defeating Lizette Cabrera and Taylah Preston in the final; 6–4, 6–3.

== Seeds ==
1. (Australia) Destanee Aiava / (Australia) Maddison Inglis (quarterfinals, withdrew)
2. (Japan) Yuki Naito / (Japan) Naho Sato (semifinals)
3. (Japan) Erina Hayashi / (Japan) Erika Sema (quarterfinals)
4. (Australia) Elena Micic / (Japan) Hikaru Sato (first round)

== Draw ==
=== Key ===
- Q = Qualifier
- WC = Wild card
- LL = Lucky loser
- Alt = Alternate
- SE = Special exempt
- PR = Protected ranking
- ITF = ITF entry
- JE = Junior exempt
- w/o = Walkover
- r = Retired
- d = Defaulted
- SR = Special ranking

=== Draw ===
First round
1	(Australia) D Aiava (Australia) M Inglis	6	6
(New Zealand) M Barry (Australia) A Smith	1	4
WC	(Australia) J Cvijanovic (Australia) S Rokusek	1	3
(Australia) L Cabrera (Australia) T Preston	6	6
4	(Australia) E Micic (Japan) H Sato	1	6	[8]
(Japan) S Hosogi (Japan) N Kawaguchi	6	2	[10]
WC	(Australia) C Stergiopoulos (Australia) B Thompson	0	6^{0}
(Japan) H Sakatsume (Slovakia) N Vargová	6	7^{7}
WC	(Australia) D Badalyan (Australia) S Mildren	1	1
(Australia) A Bozovic (Australia) P Hule	6	6
(Australia) G Da Silva-Fick (Australia) A Parnaby	4	6	[3]
3	(Japan) E Hayashi (Japan) E Sema	6	3	[10]
(India) S Bhamidipaty (India) V Chaudhari	6	6
(United States) M Horvit (Australia) T McGiffin	4	2
(Japan) R Saigo (Japan) Y Saigo	2	4
2	(Japan) Y Naito (Japan) N Sato	6	6

Quarterfinals
1	(Australia) D Aiava (Australia) M Inglis
(Australia) L Cabrera (Australia) T Preston	w/o
(Japan) S Hosogi (Japan) N Kawaguchi	5	7^{7}	[10]
(Japan) H Sakatsume (Slovakia) N Vargová	7	6^{3}	[8]
(Australia) A Bozovic (Australia) P Hule	6	6
3	(Japan) E Hayashi (Japan) E Sema	3	1
(India) S Bhamidipaty (India) V Chaudhari	4	6^{5}
2	(Japan) Y Naito (Japan) N Sato	6	7^{7}

Semifinals
(Australia) L Cabrera (Australia) T Preston	6	6
(Japan) S Hosogi (Japan) N Kawaguchi	0	4
(Australia) A Bozovic (Australia) P Hule	6	6
2	(Japan) Y Naito (Japan) N Sato	1	3

Final
(Australia) L Cabrera (Australia) T Preston	4	3
(Australia) A Bozovic (Australia) P Hule	6	6
