= 2023 City of Playford Tennis International – Women's doubles =

Women's doubles
- 2023 City of Playford Tennis International

Final
- Champions: (Australia) Talia Gibson (Australia) Priscilla Hon
- Runners-up: (Australia) Kaylah McPhee (Australia) Astra Sharma
- Score: 6–1, 6–2

Events
Singles	men	women
Doubles	men	women
← 2022 ·	City of Playford Tennis International	· 2024 →

Alexandra Bozovic and Talia Gibson were the defending champions but Bozovic chose not to participate.

Gibson played alongside Priscilla Hon and successfully defended her title, defeating Kaylah McPhee and Astra Sharma in the final, 6–1, 6–2.

== Seeds ==
1. (China) Ma Yexin / (Japan) Moyuka Uchijima (first round)
2. (Australia) Talia Gibson / (Australia) Priscilla Hon (champions)
3. (Australia) Kaylah McPhee / (Australia) Astra Sharma (final)
4. (Australia) Destanee Aiava / (Australia) Maddison Inglis (first round)

== Draw ==
=== Key ===
- Q = Qualifier
- WC = Wild card
- LL = Lucky loser
- Alt = Alternate
- SE = Special exempt
- PR = Protected ranking
- ITF = ITF entry
- JE = Junior exempt
- w/o = Walkover
- r = Retired
- d = Defaulted
- SR = Special ranking

=== Draw ===
First round
1	(China) Y Ma (Japan) M Uchijima	3	2
WC	(Australia) R Gilheany (Australia) M Joint	6	6
(Czech Republic) M Bayerlová (Australia) G Da Silva-Fick	3	6	[6]
(South Korea) J-h Choi (Indonesia) B Gumulya	6	3	[10]
3	(Australia) K McPhee (Australia) A Sharma	7	3	[10]
(Australia) P Hule (Australia) T Preston	5	6	[7]
(Australia) E Bolton (United States) M Horvit	6	7^{7}
(Japan) N Kawaguchi (Thailand) L Tararudee	4	6^{3}
WC	(Australia) E Simmons (Australia) B Thompson	3	1
(Australia) L Fairclough (Australia) T McGiffin	6	6
(Japan) K Okamura (Japan) A Shimizu	6	6
4	(Australia) D Aiava (Australia) M Inglis	2	4
(Japan) H Arakawa (Japan) N Arakawa	2	6	[7]
(Japan) S Akita (Japan) E Hayashi	6	2	[10]
(Australia) A Parnaby (Australia) I Popovic	4	0
2	(Australia) T Gibson (Australia) P Hon	6	6

Quarterfinals
WC	(Australia) R Gilheany (Australia) M Joint	4	2
(South Korea) J-h Choi (Indonesia) B Gumulya	6	6
3	(Australia) K McPhee (Australia) A Sharma	6	6
(Australia) E Bolton (United States) M Horvit	4	3
(Australia) L Fairclough (Australia) T McGiffin	1	1
(Japan) K Okamura (Japan) A Shimizu	6	6
(Japan) S Akita (Japan) E Hayashi	1	4
2	(Australia) T Gibson (Australia) P Hon	6	6

Semifinals
(South Korea) J-h Choi (Indonesia) B Gumulya	3	6^{2}
3	(Australia) K McPhee (Australia) A Sharma	6	7^{7}
(Japan) K Okamura (Japan) A Shimizu	6^{5}	3
2	(Australia) T Gibson (Australia) P Hon	7^{7}	6

Final
3	(Australia) K McPhee (Australia) A Sharma	1	2
2	(Australia) T Gibson (Australia) P Hon	6	6
