= 2015 BNP Paribas Open – Men's singles =

Men's singles
- 2015 BNP Paribas Open

Final
- Champion: (Serbia) Novak Djokovic
- Runner-up: (Switzerland) Roger Federer
- Score: 6–3, 6–7^{(5–7)}, 6–2

Details
- Draw: 96
- Seeds: 32

Events
Singles	men	women
Doubles	men	women
- Indian Wells Masters

Defending champion Novak Djokovic defeated Roger Federer in a rematch of the previous year's final, 6–3, 6–7^{(5–7)}, 6–2 to win the men's singles tennis title at the 2015 Indian Wells Masters.

== Seeds ==
All seeds received a bye into the second round.

1. (Serbia) Novak Djokovic (champion)
2. (Switzerland) Roger Federer (final)
3. (Spain) Rafael Nadal (quarterfinals)
4. (United Kingdom) Andy Murray (semifinals)
5. (Japan) Kei Nishikori (fourth round)
6. (Canada) Milos Raonic (semifinals)
7. (Switzerland) Stan Wawrinka (second round)
8. (Spain) David Ferrer (third round)
9. (Czech Republic) Tomáš Berdych (quarterfinals)
10. (Croatia) Marin Čilić (second round)
11. (Bulgaria) Grigor Dimitrov (third round)
12. (Spain) Feliciano López (quarterfinals)
13. (France) Gilles Simon (fourth round)
14. (Latvia) Ernests Gulbis (third round)
15. (Spain) Roberto Bautista Agut (third round)
16. (South Africa) Kevin Anderson (third round)
17. (Spain) Tommy Robredo (fourth round)
18. (United States) John Isner (fourth round)
19. (Italy) Fabio Fognini (second round)
20. (Uruguay) Pablo Cuevas (third round)
21. (Croatia) Ivo Karlović (second round)
22. (France) Richard Gasquet (second round, retired)
23. (Spain) Guillermo García López (second round)
24. (Argentina) Leonardo Mayer (withdrew)
25. (France) Julien Benneteau (second round)
26. (Germany) Philipp Kohlschreiber (third round)
27. (Czech Republic) Lukáš Rosol (fourth round)
28. (Spain) Fernando Verdasco (third round)
29. (Colombia) Santiago Giraldo (second round)
30. (Italy) Andreas Seppi (third round)
31. (France) Jérémy Chardy (second round)
32. (Australia) Bernard Tomic (quarterfinals, withdrew because of a back injury)
33. (Luxembourg) Gilles Müller (second round)

Click on the seed number of a player to go to their draw section.

== Draw ==
Key

- Q = Qualifier
- WC = Wild card
- LL = Lucky loser
- Alt = Alternate
- ITF = ITF entry
- PR = Protected ranking
- SR = Special ranking
- SE = Special exempt
- JE = Junior exempt
- JR = Junior Accelerator Programme entrant
- CO = College Accelerator Programme entrant
- NG = Next Gen Accelerator Program entrant
- w/o = Walkover
- r = Retired
- d = Defaulted

=== Finals ===
Quarterfinals
1	(Serbia) Novak Djokovic	w/o
32	(Australia) Bernard Tomic
4	(United Kingdom) Andy Murray	6	6
12	(Spain) Feliciano López	3	4
6	(Canada) Milos Raonic	4	7^{12}	7
3	(Spain) Rafael Nadal	6	6^{10}	5
9	(Czech Republic) Tomáš Berdych	4	0
2	(Switzerland) Roger Federer	6	6

Semifinals
1	(Serbia) Novak Djokovic	6	6
4	(United Kingdom) Andy Murray	2	3
6	(Canada) Milos Raonic	5	4
2	(Switzerland) Roger Federer	7	6

Final
1	(Serbia) Novak Djokovic	6	6^{5}	6
2	(Switzerland) Roger Federer	3	7^{7}	2

=== Top half ===
==== Section 1 ====
First round
(Cyprus) M Baghdatis	6	1
(Czech Republic) J Veselý	3	1^{r}
(Serbia) V Troicki	4	4
(Spain) A Ramos Viñolas	6	6
Q	(United States) D Novikov	4	4
Q	(Austria) J Melzer	6	6
(Argentina) F Delbonis	6	6
(Serbia) D Lajović	4	3

Second round
1	(Serbia) N Djokovic	6	6
(Cyprus) M Baghdatis	1	3
(Spain) A Ramos Viñolas	6	6
25	(France) J Benneteau	2	3
18	(United States) J Isner	6	6
Q	(Austria) J Melzer	3	4
(Argentina) F Delbonis	5	4
16	(South Africa) K Anderson	7	6

Third round
1	(Serbia) N Djokovic	7	6
(Spain) A Ramos Viñolas	5	3
18	(United States) J Isner	7^{8}	6
16	(South Africa) K Anderson	6^{6}	2

Fourth round
1	(Serbia) N Djokovic	6	7^{7}
18	(United States) J Isner	4	6^{5}

==== Section 2 ====
First round
(Russia) T Gabashvili	2	6	3
(Argentina) J Mónaco	6	3	6
(Germany) J-L Struff	6^{3}	3
WC	(Australia) T Kokkinakis	7^{7}	6
Q	(Croatia) B Ćorić	6	6
(Austria) A Haider-Maurer	4	4
(Croatia) I Dodig	6	7
(Portugal) J Sousa	3	5

Second round
10	(Croatia) M Čilić	4	4
(Argentina) J Mónaco	6	6
WC	(Australia) T Kokkinakis	7	5	6
23	(Spain) G García López	5	7	3
32	(Australia) B Tomic	6	6
Q	(Croatia) B Ćorić	3	4
(Croatia) I Dodig	6	1	6^{6}
8	(Spain) D Ferrer	4	6	7^{8}

Third round
(Argentina) J Mónaco	2	7	6^{5}
WC	(Australia) T Kokkinakis	6	5	7^{7}
32	(Australia) B Tomic	7	6
8	(Spain) D Ferrer	5	4

Fourth round
WC	(Australia) T Kokkinakis	4	6	4
32	(Australia) B Tomic	6	4	6

==== Section 3 ====
First round
(Kazakhstan) M Kukushkin	4	2^{r}
(Canada) V Pospisil	6	4
WC	(United States) T Smyczek	6	7^{7}
(Germany) B Becker	3	6^{4}
Q	(Germany) M Zverev	4	4
(France) A Mannarino	6	6
LL	(Spain) D Gimeno Traver	7^{7}	7^{8}
(Australia) S Groth	6^{5}	6^{6}

Second round
4	(United Kingdom) A Murray	6	6
(Canada) V Pospisil	1	3
WC	(United States) T Smyczek	3	1
26	(Germany) P Kohlschreiber	6	6
19	(Italy) F Fognini	6^{8}	3
(France) A Mannarino	7^{10}	6
LL	(Spain) D Gimeno Traver	4	1
14	(Latvia) E Gulbis	6	6

Third round
4	(United Kingdom) A Murray	6	3	6
26	(Germany) P Kohlschreiber	1	6	1
(France) A Mannarino	6	6
14	(Latvia) E Gulbis	4	4

Fourth round
4	(United Kingdom) A Murray	6	6
(France) A Mannarino	3	3

==== Section 4 ====
First round
(Australia) M Matosevic	7	4	3
Q	(France) É Roger-Vasselin	5	6	6
(Finland) J Nieminen	7^{7}	6
Q	(Netherlands) T de Bakker	6^{3}	4
Q	(Australia) J Duckworth	7^{7}	6
(Austria) D Thiem	6^{5}	1
PR	(United States) M Fish	4	6	6^{3}
WC	(United States) R Harrison	6	4	7^{7}

Second round
12	(Spain) F López	6^{3}	6	6
Q	(France) É Roger-Vasselin	7^{7}	4	4
(Finland) J Nieminen	6	5	0
20	(Uruguay) P Cuevas	4	7	6
28	(Spain) F Verdasco	6	7^{7}
Q	(Australia) J Duckworth	2	6^{3}
WC	(United States) R Harrison	4	4
5	(Japan) K Nishikori	6	6

Third round
12	(Spain) F López	6	4	6
20	(Uruguay) P Cuevas	2	6	3
28	(Spain) F Verdasco	7^{8}	1	4
5	(Japan) K Nishikori	6^{6}	6	6

Fourth round
12	(Spain) F López	6	7^{7}
5	(Japan) K Nishikori	4	6^{2}

=== Bottom half ===
==== Section 5 ====
First round
(Italy) S Bolelli	6	6^{3}	6
(Brazil) T Bellucci	2	7^{7}	4
(Ukraine) A Dolgopolov	6	7
Q	(Canada) F Dancevic	2	5
(Kazakhstan) A Golubev	6^{4}	6	7^{7}
(Germany) D Brown	7^{7}	3	6^{3}
(Australia) N Kyrgios	6	7
WC	(United States) D Kudla	4	5

Second round
6	(Canada) M Raonic	6	6
(Italy) S Bolelli	3	4
(Ukraine) A Dolgopolov	6	7^{7}
29	(Colombia) S Giraldo	1	6^{4}
17	(Spain) T Robredo	6	6^{5}	6
(Kazakhstan) A Golubev	4	7^{7}	4
(Australia) N Kyrgios	6^{2}	6	6^{4}
11	(Bulgaria) G Dimitrov	7^{7}	3	7^{7}

Third round
6	(Canada) M Raonic	7^{7}	6
(Ukraine) A Dolgopolov	6^{2}	4
17	(Spain) T Robredo	6	1	7
11	(Bulgaria) G Dimitrov	4	6	5

Fourth round
6	(Canada) M Raonic	6	6
17	(Spain) T Robredo	3	2

==== Section 6 ====
First round
(Japan) T Ito	5	1
(Tunisia) M Jaziri	7	6
(Dominican Republic) V Estrella Burgos	3	7	4
Q	(Germany) M Berrer	6	5	6
(United States) D Young	6	6
(Spain) P Carreño Busta	3	4
(Netherlands) I Sijsling	6	3	6
Q	(Serbia) F Krajinović	4	6	2

Second round
13	(France) G Simon	6	4	6
(Tunisia) M Jaziri	3	6	2
Q	(Germany) M Berrer	7^{8}	4	3
22	(France) R Gasquet	6^{6}	6	1^{r}
31	(France) J Chardy	4	2
(United States) D Young	6	6
(Netherlands) I Sijsling	4	2
3	(Spain) R Nadal	6	6

Third round
13	(France) G Simon	6	7
Q	(Germany) M Berrer	2	5
(United States) D Young	4	2
3	(Spain) R Nadal	6	6

Fourth round
13	(France) G Simon	2	4
3	(Spain) R Nadal	6	6

==== Section 7 ====
First round
(Netherlands) R Haase	6	6
Q	(Australia) A Bolt	4	2
(Slovakia) M Kližan	7^{7}	6
(Spain) P Andújar	6^{4}	3
(United States) S Johnson	6	6
(Spain) M Granollers	2	3
(United States) S Querrey	6	4	2
(Ukraine) S Stakhovsky	2	6	6

Second round
7	(Switzerland) S Wawrinka	3	6	3
(Netherlands) R Haase	6	3	6
(Slovakia) M Kližan	6	0	3
27	(Czech Republic) L Rosol	4	6	6
21	(Croatia) I Karlović	3	6^{5}
(United States) S Johnson	6	7^{7}
(Ukraine) S Stakhovsky	1	4
9	(Czech Republic) T Berdych	6	6

Third round
(Netherlands) R Haase	4	7^{7}	6^{3}
27	(Czech Republic) L Rosol	6	6^{4}	7^{7}
(United States) S Johnson	4	2
9	(Czech Republic) T Berdych	6	6

Fourth round
27	(Czech Republic) L Rosol	2	6	4
9	(Czech Republic) T Berdych	6	4	6

==== Section 8 ====
First round
(Uzbekistan) D Istomin	7^{7}	6
WC	(United States) A Krajicek	6^{5}	4
(United States) J Sock	6^{4}	6	7
(Chinese Taipei) Y-h Lu	7^{7}	2	5
(Russia) M Youzhny	3	4
Q	(Romania) V Hănescu	6	6
(Poland) J Janowicz	4	6	6^{3}
(Argentina) D Schwartzman	6	3	7^{7}

Second round
15	(Spain) R Bautista Agut	6	6
(Uzbekistan) D Istomin	4	3
(United States) J Sock	3	6	7^{9}
33	(Luxembourg) G Müller	6	3	6^{7}
30	(Italy) A Seppi	6	6
Q	(Romania) V Hănescu	4	4
(Argentina) D Schwartzman	4	2
2	(Switzerland) R Federer	6	6

Third round
15	(Spain) R Bautista Agut	6	3	2
(United States) J Sock	3	6	6
30	(Italy) A Seppi	3	4
2	(Switzerland) R Federer	6	6

Fourth round
(United States) J Sock	3	2
2	(Switzerland) R Federer	6	6

== Qualifying ==
=== Seeds ===
1. (Croatia) Borna Ćorić (qualified)
2. (Japan) Go Soeda (first round)
3. (Austria) Jürgen Melzer (qualified)
4. (Bosnia and Herzegovina) Damir Džumhur (first round)
5. (Spain) Daniel Gimeno Traver (qualifying competition, lucky loser)
6. (Germany) Tobias Kamke (first round)
7. (Uzbekistan) Farrukh Dustov (first round)
8. (Serbia) Filip Krajinović (qualified)
9. (Australia) James Duckworth (qualified)
10. (France) Paul-Henri Mathieu (first round)
11. (United Kingdom) James Ward (qualifying competition)
12. (Israel) Dudi Sela (first round)
13. (Slovenia) Aljaž Bedene (first round)
14. (Colombia) Alejandro Falla (first round)
15. (Netherlands) Thiemo de Bakker (qualified)
16. (Portugal) Gastão Elias (first round)
17. (Germany) Alexander Zverev (first round)
18. (United States) Rajeev Ram (qualifying competition)
19. (France) Édouard Roger-Vasselin (qualified)
20. (Romania) Victor Hănescu (qualified)
21. (Japan) Yoshihito Nishioka (first round)
22. (Italy) Marco Cecchinato (first round)
23. (Germany) Michael Berrer (qualified)
24. (Australia) Luke Saville (qualifying competition)

=== Qualifiers ===
1. (Croatia) Borna Ćorić
2. (Australia) Alex Bolt
3. (Austria) Jürgen Melzer
4. (Canada) Frank Dancevic
5. (United States) Dennis Novikov
6. (Romania) Victor Hănescu
7. (Germany) Michael Berrer
8. (Serbia) Filip Krajinović
9. (Australia) James Duckworth
10. (France) Édouard Roger-Vasselin
11. (Germany) Mischa Zverev
12. (Netherlands) Thiemo de Bakker

=== Lucky loser ===
1. (Spain) Daniel Gimeno Traver

=== Qualifying draw ===
==== First qualifier ====
First round
1	(Croatia) Borna Ćorić	6	6
WC	(Ukraine) Artem Smirnov	2	2
(United States) Bjorn Fratangelo	7^{7}	6
16	(Portugal) Gastão Elias	6^{3}	4

Qualifying competition
1	(Croatia) Borna Ćorić	6	1	7^{9}
(United States) Bjorn Fratangelo	2	6	6^{7}

==== Second qualifier ====
First round
2	(Japan) Go Soeda	6	2	2
(Australia) Alex Bolt	4	6	6
(Republic of Ireland) James McGee	5	6	6
14	(Colombia) Alejandro Falla	7	3	4

Qualifying competition
(Australia) Alex Bolt	6	7
(Republic of Ireland) James McGee	3	5

==== Third qualifier ====
First round
3	(Austria) Jürgen Melzer	6	1
(Thailand) Danai Udomchoke	4	2^{r}
(United States) Michael Russell	3	6	6
17	(Germany) Alexander Zverev	6	4	2

Qualifying competition
3	(Austria) Jürgen Melzer	6	5	6
(United States) Michael Russell	4	7	3

==== Fourth qualifier ====
First round
4	(Bosnia and Herzegovina) Damir Džumhur	3	3
(Canada) Frank Dancevic	6	6
PR	(Germany) Philipp Petzschner	6	7
22	(Italy) Marco Cecchinato	4	5

Qualifying competition
(Canada) Frank Dancevic	5	6	6
PR	(Germany) Philipp Petzschner	7	4	1

==== Fifth qualifier ====
First round
5	(Spain) Daniel Gimeno Traver	7^{7}	6
(United States) Jason Jung	6^{3}	2
(United States) Dennis Novikov	6^{5}	7^{7}	6
13	(Slovenia) Aljaž Bedene	7^{7}	6^{5}	3

Qualifying competition
5	(Spain) Daniel Gimeno Traver	3	6	6^{4}
(United States) Dennis Novikov	6	4	7^{7}

==== Sixth qualifier ====
First round
6	(Germany) Tobias Kamke	3	7^{7}	2
(Georgia (country)) Nikoloz Basilashvili	6	6^{4}	6
(United States) Alex Kuznetsov	4	1
20	(Romania) Victor Hănescu	6	6

Qualifying competition
(Georgia (country)) Nikoloz Basilashvili	6	4	6^{5}
20	(Romania) Victor Hănescu	3	6	7^{7}

==== Seventh qualifier ====
First round
7	(Uzbekistan) Farrukh Dustov	7	4	1
WC	(United States) Mackenzie McDonald	5	6	6
(Japan) Taro Daniel	4	2
23	(Germany) Michael Berrer	6	6

Qualifying competition
WC	(United States) Mackenzie McDonald	4	4
23	(Germany) Michael Berrer	6	6

==== Eighth qualifier ====
First round
8	(Serbia) Filip Krajinović	6^{3}	6	7^{7}
(Australia) John-Patrick Smith	7^{7}	3	6^{3}
(Poland) Łukasz Kubot	4	5
24	(Australia) Luke Saville	6	7

Qualifying competition
8	(Serbia) Filip Krajinović	6	7^{7}
24	(Australia) Luke Saville	1	6^{3}

==== Ninth qualifier ====
First round
9	(Australia) James Duckworth	6	2	7^{7}
(United States) Jared Donaldson	3	6	6^{3}
(Argentina) Marco Trungelliti	1	6	3
18	(United States) Rajeev Ram	6	4	6

Qualifying competition
9	(Australia) James Duckworth	2	7	6
18	(United States) Rajeev Ram	6	5	4

==== Tenth qualifier ====
First round
10	(France) Paul-Henri Mathieu	6^{13}	3
WC	(Germany) Yannick Hanfmann	7^{15}	6
(Argentina) Guido Andreozzi	5	5
19	(France) Édouard Roger-Vasselin	7	7

Qualifying competition
WC	(Germany) Yannick Hanfmann	4	6	4
19	(France) Édouard Roger-Vasselin	6	3	6

==== Eleventh qualifier ====
First round
11	(United Kingdom) James Ward	2	6	7^{7}
(United States) Mitchell Krueger	6	3	6^{0}
WC	(Germany) Mischa Zverev	6	6
21	(Japan) Yoshihito Nishioka	4	3

Qualifying competition
11	(United Kingdom) James Ward	3	1
WC	(Germany) Mischa Zverev	6	6

==== Twelfth qualifier ====
First round
12	(Israel) Dudi Sela	3	0
WC	(United States) Taylor Harry Fritz	6	6
(Ecuador) Emilio Gómez	5	3
15	(Netherlands) Thiemo de Bakker	7	6

Qualifying competition
WC	(United States) Taylor Harry Fritz	4	4
15	(Netherlands) Thiemo de Bakker	6	6
