= 2023 Cary Challenger II – Singles =

Singles
- 2023 Cary Challenger II

Final
- Champion: (United States) Zachary Svajda
- Runner-up: (Australia) Rinky Hijikata
- Score: 7–6^{(7–3)}, 4–6, 6–1

Events
| Singles | Doubles |
- Cary Challenger

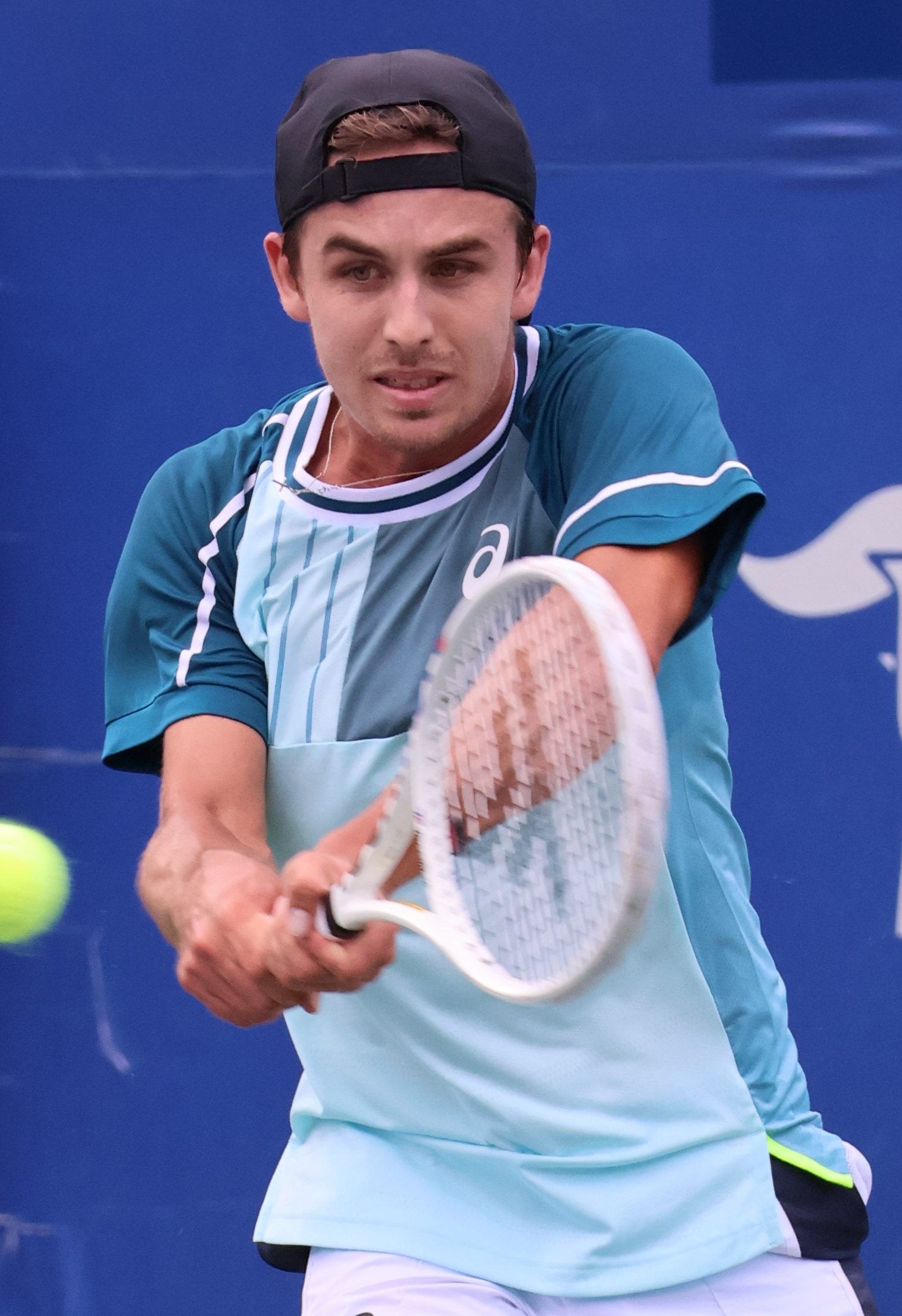
Zachary Svajda (pictured in the second round) won the title.

Adam Walton was the defending champion but lost in the second round to Patrick Kypson.

Zachary Svajda won the title after defeating Rinky Hijikata 7–6^{(7–3)}, 4–6, 6–1 in the final.

== Seeds ==
1. (Australia) Rinky Hijikata (final)
2. (United States) Alex Michelsen (semifinals)
3. (France) Enzo Couacaud (first round)
4. (Australia) Adam Walton (second round)
5. (United Kingdom) Ryan Peniston (withdrew)
6. (United States) Tennys Sandgren (quarterfinals)
7. (Argentina) Guido Andreozzi (quarterfinals)
8. (United States) Zachary Svajda (champion)

== Draw ==
Key

- Q = Qualifier
- WC = Wild card
- LL = Lucky loser
- Alt = Alternate
- ITF = ITF entry
- PR = Protected ranking
- SR = Special ranking
- SE = Special exempt
- JE = Junior exempt
- JR = Junior Accelerator Programme entrant
- CO = College Accelerator Programme entrant
- NG = Next Gen Accelerator Program entrant
- w/o = Walkover
- r = Retired
- d = Defaulted

=== Finals ===
Semifinals
1 | (Australia) Rinky Hijikata | 6 | 6
(United States) Patrick Kypson | 4 | 2
8 | (United States) Zachary Svajda | 6 | 7
2 | (United States) Alex Michelsen | 3 | 5

Final
1 | (Australia) Rinky Hijikata | 6^{3} | 6 | 1
8 | (United States) Zachary Svajda | 7^{7} | 4 | 6

=== Top half ===
First round
1 | (Australia) R Hijikata | 6 | 6
WC | (Spain) Pedro Ródenas | 3 | 1
Q | (United States) D Young | 5 | 4
(United States) Christian Langmo | 7 | 6
Q | (Spain) P Vives Marcos | 6 | 4 | 6
(Germany) Elmar Ejupovic | 2 | 6 | 2
(Australia) B Tomic | 7 | 6
LL | (United States) C Kingsley | 5 | 3
4 | (Australia) A Walton | 7 | 6
(United States) M Krueger | 5 | 2
(United States) P Kypson | 6 | 6
(Belgium) M Geerts | 1 | 3
WC | (United Kingdom) William Jansen | 4 | 3
Q | (United States) T-S Kwiatkowski | 6 | 6
(Argentina) JP Ficovich | 2 | 6 | 3
6 | (United States) T Sandgren | 6 | 4 | 6

Second round
1 | (Australia) R Hijikata | 6 | 3 | 6
(United States) C Langmo | 4 | 6 | 3
Q | (Spain) P Vives Marcos | 6 | 6
(Australia) B Tomic | 4 | 2
4 | (Australia) A Walton | 5 | 3
(United States) P Kypson | 7 | 6
Q | (United States) T-S Kwiatkowski | 5 | 1^{r}
6 | (United States) T Sandgren | 7 | 4

Quarterfinals
1 | (Australia) R Hijikata | 6 | 7
Q | (Spain) P Vives Marcos | 1 | 5
(United States) P Kypson | 7^{7} | 6
6 | (United States) T Sandgren | 6^{4} | 3

Semifinals
1 | (Australia) R Hijikata | 6 | 6
(United States) P Kypson | 4 | 2

=== Bottom half ===
First round
8 | (United States) Z Svajda | 4 | 6 | 6
(United States) E Quinn | 6 | 3 | 4
Q | (United States) G Johns | 6 | 3 | 7^{7}
WC | (United States) Dar Blanch | 2 | 6 | 6^{2}
PR | (Canada) B Schnur | 3 | 7^{7} | 3
(United Kingdom) T Samuel | 6 | 6^{5} | 6
(Ukraine) I Marchenko | 6 | 7^{7}
3 | (France) E Couacaud | 4 | 6^{2}
7 | (Argentina) G Andreozzi | 6 | 6
Q | (France) Jaimee Floyd Angele | 2 | 2
(United States) A Mayo | 6 | 4 | 2
PR | (United States) C Harrison | 4 | 6 | 6
(Australia) T Schoolkate | 7^{7} | 3 | 6^{3}
Q | (United States) S Kirchheimer | 6^{5} | 6 | 7^{7}
(France) M Janvier | 7 | 6^{7} | 3
2 | (United States) A Michelsen | 5 | 7^{9} | 6

Second round
8 | (United States) Z Svajda | 6 | 6
Q | (United States) G Johns | 3 | 3
(United Kingdom) T Samuel | 7 | 6^{6} | 6
(Ukraine) I Marchenko | 5 | 7^{8} | 1
7 | (Argentina) G Andreozzi | 6 | 7^{7}
PR | (United States) C Harrison | 1 | 6^{3}
Q | (United States) S Kirchheimer | 3 | 1
2 | (United States) A Michelsen | 6 | 6

Quarterfinals
8 | (United States) Z Svajda | 7 | 5 | 6
(United Kingdom) T Samuel | 5 | 7 | 1
7 | (Argentina) G Andreozzi | 3 | 5
2 | (United States) A Michelsen | 6 | 7

Semifinals
8 | (United States) Z Svajda | 6 | 7
2 | (United States) A Michelsen | 3 | 5
