= 2023 Cary Challenger II =

- Date: 11–17 September
- Edition: 11th
- Surface: Hard
- Location: Cary, North Carolina, United States

Champions

Singles
- (United States) Zachary Svajda

Doubles
- (Australia) Andrew Harris / (Australia) Rinky Hijikata
- Cary Challenger

The 2023 Cary Challenger II was a professional tennis tournament being played on hard courts. It was the 11th edition of the tournament which was part of the 2023 ATP Challenger Tour. It took place in Cary, North Carolina, United States between 11 and 17 September 2023.

== Singles main-draw entrants ==
=== Seeds ===
Country	Player	Rank^{1}	Seed
AUS	Rinky Hijikata	110	1
USA	Alex Michelsen	127	2
FRA	Enzo Couacaud	180	3
AUS	Adam Walton	195	4
~~GBR~~	~~Ryan Peniston~~	~~201~~	~~5~~
USA	Tennys Sandgren	207	6
ARG	Guido Andreozzi	226	7
USA	Zachary Svajda	234	8

- ^{1} Rankings are as of August 28, 2023.

=== Other entrants ===
The following players received wildcards into the singles main draw:

- (United States) Darwin Blanch
- (United Kingdom) William Jansen
- (Spain) Pedro Ródenas

The following players received entry into the singles main draw using protected rankings:

- (United States) Christian Harrison
- (Canada) Brayden Schnur

The following players received entry from the qualifying draw:

- (France) Jaimee Floyd Angele
- (United States) Garrett Johns
- (United States) Strong Kirchheimer
- (United States) Thai-Son Kwiatkowski
- (Spain) Pedro Vives Marcos
- (United States) Donald Young

The following player received entry as a lucky loser:

- (United States) Cannon Kingsley

== Champions ==
=== Singles ===
- (United States) Zachary Svajda def. (Australia) Rinky Hijikata 7–6^{(7–3)}, 4–6, 6–1.

=== Doubles ===
- (Australia) Andrew Harris / (Australia) Rinky Hijikata def. (United States) William Blumberg / (Venezuela) Luis David Martínez 6–4, 3–6, [10–6].
