= Rinky Hijikata =

Australian tennis player (born 2001)

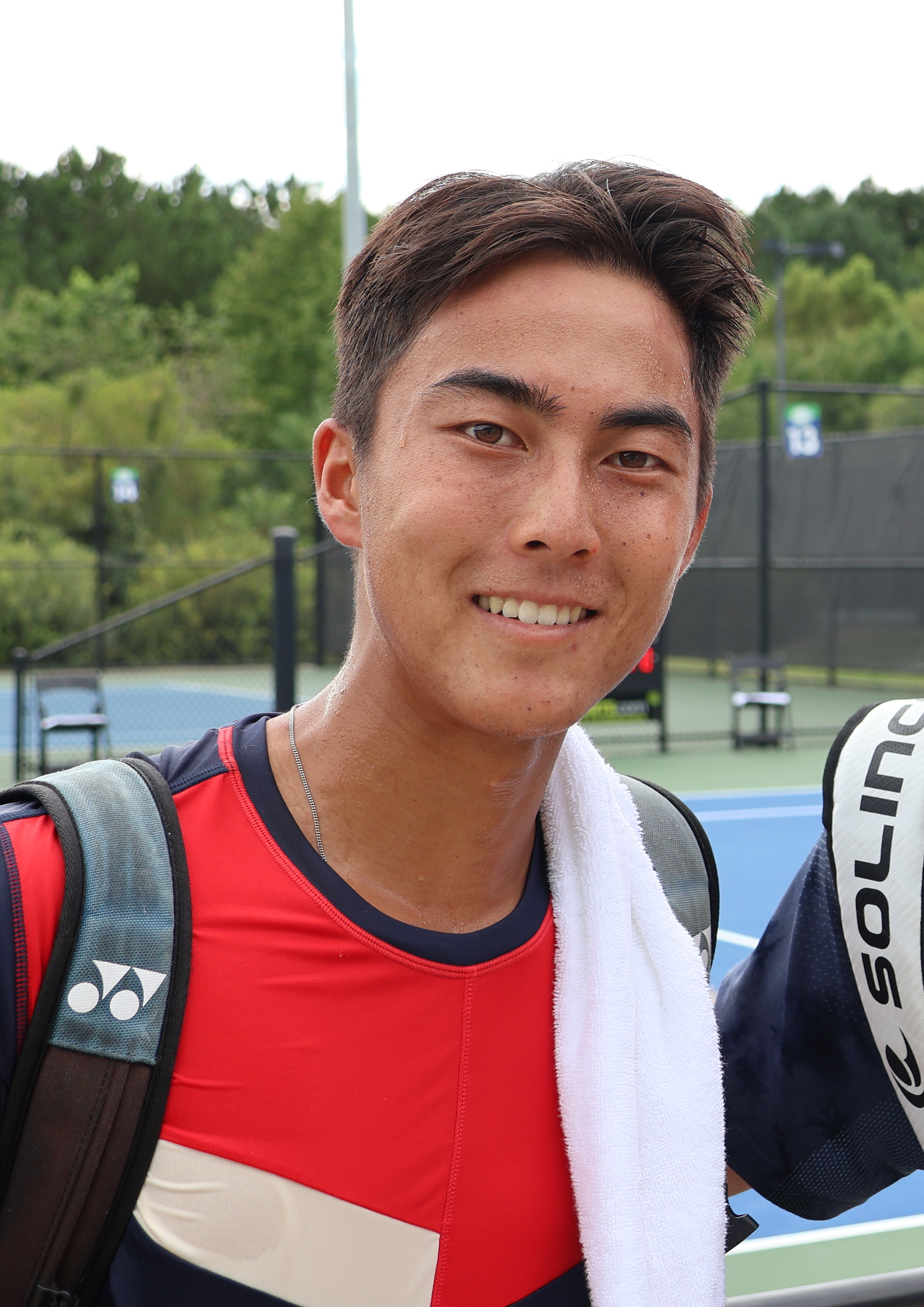
- Hijikata at the 2023 Cary Challenger II
- Native name: 土方 凛輝
- Country (sports): Australia
- Born: 23 February 2001 (age 25) Sydney, New South Wales, Australia
- Height: 1.78 m (5 ft 10 in)
- Turned pro: 2021
- Plays: Right-handed (two-handed backhand)
- College: UNC
- Coach: Mark Draper
- Prize money: US $5,184,165

Singles
- Career record: 53–77
- Career titles: 0
- Highest ranking: No. 59 (9 November 2026)
- Current ranking: No. 59 (9 November 2026)

Grand Slam singles results
- Australian Open: 2R (2023, 2026)
- French Open: 1R (2024, 2025, 2026)
- Wimbledon: 2R (2025)
- US Open: 4R (2023)

Other tournaments
- Olympic Games: 1R (2024)

Doubles
- Career record: 51–50
- Career titles: 2
- Highest ranking: No. 23 (30 October 2023)
- Current ranking: No. 160 (9 November 2026)

Grand Slam doubles results
- Australian Open: W (2023)
- French Open: 2R (2024)
- Wimbledon: F (2025)
- US Open: 2R (2024)

Other doubles tournaments
- Tour Finals: RR (2023)

Grand Slam mixed doubles results
- Australian Open: 2R (2023)
Medal record
Boys' Tennis
Representing a (International Olympic Committee) mixed-NOCs team
Youth Olympic Games
| Silver medal – second place | 2018 Buenos Aires | Doubles |
- Last updated on: 9 November 2026.

Rinky Hijikata (土方 凛輝; born 23 February 2001) is an Australian professional tennis player. He has a career-high ATP singles ranking of world No. 59 achieved on 9 November 2026 and a best doubles ranking of No. 23 reached on 30 October 2023.

His best achievement is a major doubles title at the 2023 Australian Open, playing with countryman Jason Kubler.

== Early life ==
Hijikata was born in Sydney, Australia to Japanese immigrant parents. He began playing tennis at age three or four. He attended The King's School in Sydney from 2013 to 2016. His father is a tennis coach. His favourite player growing up was Lleyton Hewitt and later, Kei Nishikori.

== College career ==
Hijikata had a successful career at the University of North Carolina where he played college tennis for the North Carolina Tar Heels men's tennis from 2019 to 2021.

== Professional career ==
=== 2018–21: Pro beginnings ===
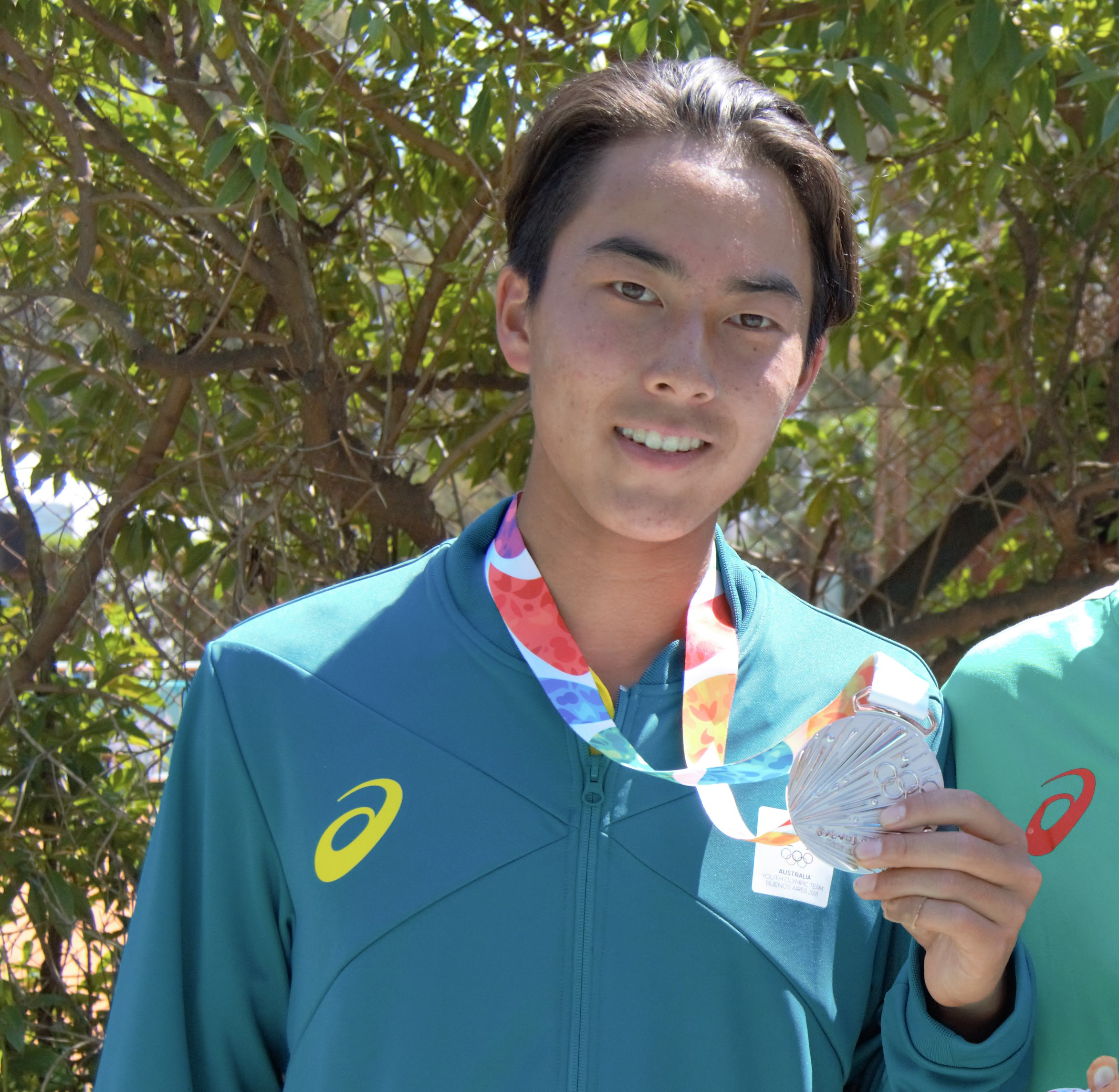
Hijikata in 2018

In March 2018, Hijikata made his ITF debut at the Australia F3 in Mornington, Australia. He won his first match the following week at the Australia F4.

In October 2018, Hijikata won silver at the Tennis at the 2018 Summer Youth Olympics – Boys' doubles, teaming with Bulgaria's Adrian Andreev.

In January 2019, Hijikata was given a wildcard into the 2019 Australian Open – Men's singles qualifying. He lost in the first round to Hiroki Moriya. In March, Hijikata reached the quarterfinals and semifinals in the ITF events in Mornington, Australia. Later that year, in September, Hijikata won his first professional singles title at the M15 Fayetteville, in Arkansas, United States.

Hijikata received wildcards into qualifying for the Australian Open in both 2020 and 2021, losing in the second round both times.

Hijikata won his second and third ITF titles in July 2021 and claimed a total of four ITF World Tennis Tour singles titles during 2021. He finished 2021 with a singles ranking of 369 as of 22 November 2021.

=== 2022: ATP & Major debut, Maiden win & Challenger title, top 200 ===
In January 2022, Hijikata made his ATP tour debut at the 2022 Melbourne Summer Set 1 after qualifying for the main draw. It was also Hijikata's first top 100 win, defeating world number 98 Henri Laaksonen in the final qualifying round. He lost in the first round to eventual finalist, Maxime Cressy. He also played doubles with Christopher O'Connell.

Hijikata lost in the second round of the 2022 Australian Open – Men's singles qualifying.

In April, Hijikata broke into the ATP top 300 after winning consecutive ITF tournaments in California in March 2022.

In August, he qualified for the 2022 Los Cabos Open and reached the round of 16 recording his first ATP win after the retirement of the Mexican wildcard debutant Rodrigo Pacheco Méndez. He lost to top seed and World No. 1 Daniil Medvedev who recorded his 250th match win. As a result, he moved one position shy of the top 200 on 8 August 2022. He made his Grand Slam debut at the US Open as a wildcard.

Hijikata won his maiden Challenger title in Playford, Australia and moved 33 positions up into the top 160 at world No. 159 on 31 October 2022. He became the youngest Australian to win a Challenger title since 2018, when the-then 19-year-old Alexei Popyrin won in Jinan, China.

=== 2023: Major doubles title & top 25, Masters singles debut & top 75 ===
Hijikata was given a wildcard into the Australian Open, where he recorded his first Grand Slam win by defeating Yannick Hanfmann in a come-from-behind victory. He lost in the second round to third seed Stefanos Tsitsipas. Pairing with Jason Kubler in the men's doubles event, they won the title after defeating three seeded teams en route; sixth seeds Lloyd Glasspool and Harri Heliövaara in the second round, saved a match point in the third round against Tomislav Brkić and Gonzalo Escobar, top seeds and world No. 1 doubles pair Wesley Koolhof and Neal Skupski in the quarterfinals, and eighth seeds Marcel Granollers and Horacio Zeballos in the semifinals. They went on to defeat Hugo Nys and Jan Zieliński in the final, becoming the second consecutive all-Australian champions at the event.

At the 2023 Delray Beach Open he reached the semifinals in doubles partnering American Reese Stalder and defeating second seeded pair of Jamie Murray and Michael Venus in the quarterfinals. He reached the final defeating Mexican duo Hans Hach Verdugo and Miguel Ángel Reyes-Varela.

He made his Masters 1000 debut in Indian Wells as a qualifier, and defeated Mikael Ymer in the first round in straight sets. He lost in the second round to 30th seed Sebastián Báez.

At the Rosmalen Grass Court Championships he entered the main draw as a lucky loser for his debut on grass and won his first match defeating wildcard Gijs Brouwer. He then defeated Marc-Andrea Hüsler from a set down to reach his first ATP tour level quarterfinal. Again from a set down, he beat Mackenzie McDonald to reach his first semifinal at ATP tour level.

He reached the fourth round of the 2023 US Open having received a wildcard, defeating Pavel Kotov, Márton Fucsovics and Zhang Zhizhen. As a result, he made his top 100 debut in the rankings at world No. 82 climbing 28 spots on 11 September 2023. He qualified on his debut at the 2023 Rolex Shanghai Masters and defeated Laslo Djere in the first round. At the same tournament he reached the semifinals partnering Cameron Norrie. At the 2023 Japan Open Tennis Championships he won his second doubles title with compatriot Max Purcell. As a result, he reached the top 25 in doubles on 23 October 2023.

=== 2024: First win on clay, ATP 500 debut & quarterfinal ===
Hijikata started the year off with a quarterfinal appearance at the 2024 Brisbane International, defeating fellow Australian Thanasi Kokkinakis and Tomáš Macháč before being defeated by eventual champion Grigor Dimitrov.

At the 2024 Dallas Open, Hijikata made it to his fourth doubles final alongside William Blumberg, losing to Max Purcell and Jordan Thompson. He reached his third ATP quarterfinal at the 2024 Delray Beach Open a defeat over Liam Broady and an upset over sixth seed Matteo Arnaldi. At the 2024 Los Cabos Open he again upset the sixth seed, this time Miomir Kecmanović. At the 2024 U.S. Men's Clay Court Championships he recorded his first clay court win over fifth seed Christopher Eubanks.

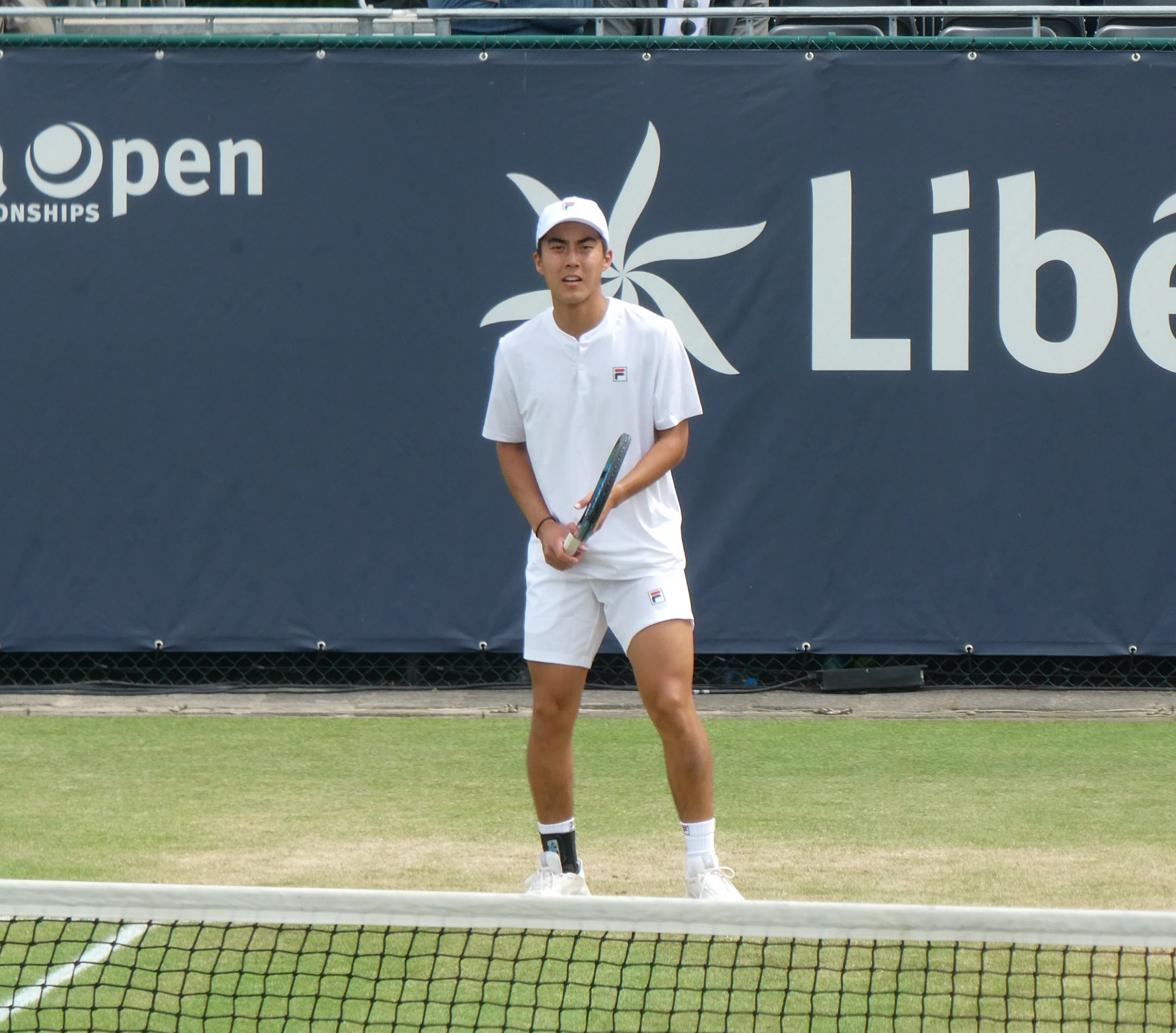
Hijikata at the 2024 Libéma Open

At the 2024 Libéma Open he lost to compatriot Alexei Popyrin in singles, while he reached the quarterfinals in doubles. At the 2024 Queen's Club Championships, where he made his ATP 500 main draw debut as a qualifier, he defeated Frances Tiafoe by retirement and Matteo Arnaldi to reach his second grass court quarterfinal.

In doubles at the 2024 Wimbledon Championships, Hijikata partnered fellow Australian John Peers. The pair defeated Jamie Murray and Andy Murray in the first round, which was the latter's final appearance at Wimbledon.

On his debut at the 2024 National Bank Open in Montreal he qualified for the main draw and recorded his first win at the tournament and only his second at a Masters level over qualifier Taro Daniel. As a result, he reached the top 65 in the rankings on 12 August 2024 and No. 62 two weeks later, after advancing to his fourth ATP quarterfinal of the season at the 2024 Winston-Salem Open.

=== 2025: Wimbledon doubles finalist ===
At the 2025 Wimbledon Championships Hijikata reached the final with David Pel as alternate pair, defeating third seeds Kevin Krawietz and Tim Pütz and top seeds and world No. 1 duo Marcelo Arévalo and Mate Pavić en route. They lost the championship match to fifth seeds Julian Cash and Lloyd Glasspool.

=== 2026: First Masters quarterfinal and top 10 win, top 60 ===
At the Masters 1000, the 2026 BNP Paribas Open, Hijikata qualified for the main draw and reached the third round of a Masters 1000 for the first time in his career defeating 20th seed Luciano Darderi. He went one step further to reach the fourth round and defeated top 10 player Alexander Bublik, his first top-10 win. As a result, Hijikata returned to the top 100 in the singles rankings on 16 March 2026 at world No. 98.

Hijikata lost in the first round at the 2026 National Bank Open. He received a singles main draw wildcard for his next Masters 1000 appearance at the 2026 Cincinnati Open where he defeated wildcard Gael Monfils and 19th seed Luciano Darderi to reach the third round on his debut at this event.

On his debut at the 2026 Paris Masters, Hijikata reached the quarterfinals for the first time at the Masters 1000-level, after qualifying for the main draw, defeating Novak Djokovic and Tomas Martin Etcheverry. As a result he entered the top 60 at a new career-high of world No. 59 in the singles rankings on 9 November 2026.

== Performance timelines ==
Key
| W | F | SF | QF | #R | RR | Q# | P# | DNQ | A | Z# | PO | G | S | B | NMS | NTI | P | NH |

(W) winner; (F) finalist; (SF) semifinalist; (QF) quarterfinalist; (#R) rounds 4, 3, 2, 1; (RR) round-robin stage; (Q#) qualification round; (P#) preliminary round; (DNQ) did not qualify; (A) absent; (Z#) Davis/Fed Cup Zonal Group (with number indication) or (PO) play-off; (G) gold, (S) silver or (B) bronze Olympic/Paralympic medal; (NMS) not a Masters tournament; (NTI) not a Tier I tournament; (P) postponed; (NH) not held; (SR) strike rate (events won / competed); (W–L) win–loss record.
To avoid confusion and double counting, these charts are updated at the conclusion of a tournament or when the player's participation has ended.

=== Singles ===
Current through the 2026 Rolex Paris Masters.

| Tournament | 2019 | 2020 | 2021 | 2022 | 2023 | 2024 | 2025 | 2026 | SR | W–L | % |
|---|---|---|---|---|---|---|---|---|---|---|---|
Grand Slam tournaments
| Australian Open | Q1 | Q2 | Q2 | Q2 | 2R | 1R | 1R | 2R | 0 / 4 | 2–4 | 33% |
| French Open | A | A | A | A | Q1 | 1R | 1R | 1R | 0 / 3 | 0–3 | 0% |
| Wimbledon | A | NH | A | Q3 | Q2 | 1R | 2R | 1R | 0 / 3 | 1–3 | 25% |
| US Open | A | A | A | 1R | 4R | 2R | 1R | 1R | 0 / 5 | 4–5 | 44% |
| Win–loss | 0–0 | 0–0 | 0–0 | 0–1 | 4–2 | 1–4 | 1–4 | 1–4 | 0 / 15 | 7–15 | 32% |
National representation
| Summer Olympics | NH | | A | NH | | 1R | NH | | 0 / 1 | 0–1 | 0% |
ATP Masters 1000
| Indian Wells Masters | A | NH | A | A | 2R | Q1 | 2R | 4R | 0 / 3 | 5–3 | 63% |
| Miami Open | A | NH | A | A | Q1 | 1R | 2R | Q2 | 0 / 2 | 1–2 | 33% |
| Madrid Open | A | NH | A | A | A | A | 1R | Q1 | 0 / 1 | 0–1 | 0% |
| Italian Open | A | A | A | A | A | 1R | 1R | Q2 | 0 / 2 | 0–2 | 0% |
| Canadian Open | A | NH | A | A | A | 2R | A | 1R | 0 / 2 | 1–2 | 33% |
| Cincinnati Masters | A | A | A | A | Q1 | Q2 | A | 3R | 0 / 1 | 2–1 | 67% |
| Shanghai Masters | A | NH | | | 2R | 1R | Q2 | 1R | 0 / 3 | 1–3 | 25% |
| Paris Masters | A | A | A | A | A | A | A | QF | 0 / 1 | 3–1 | 75% |
| Win–loss | 0–0 | 0–0 | 0–0 | 0–0 | 2–2 | 1–4 | 2–4 | 8–5 | 0 / 15 | 13–15 | 46% |
Career statistics
| | 2019 | 2020 | 2021 | 2022 | 2023 | 2024 | 2025 | 2026 | Total | | |
| Tournaments | 0 | 0 | 0 | 3 | 11 | 22 | 18 | 22 | 76 | | |
| Titles | 0 | 0 | 0 | 0 | 0 | 0 | 0 | 0 | 0 | | |
| Finals | 0 | 0 | 0 | 0 | 0 | 0 | 0 | 0 | 0 | | |
| Overall win–loss | 0–0 | 0–0 | 0–0 | 1–3 | 11–11 | 15–22 | 8–18 | 18–23 | 53–77 | | 41% |
| Year-end ranking | 742 | 685 | 375 | 164 | 71 | 73 | 125 | | | | |

=== Doubles ===
| Tournament | 2022 | 2023 | 2024 | 2025 | 2026 | SR | W–L | % |
|---|---|---|---|---|---|---|---|---|
| Grand Slam tournaments | | | | | | | | |
| Australian Open | 2R | W | 2R | 1R | 1R | 1 / 5 | 8–4 | 67% |
| French Open | A | 1R | 2R | 1R | 1R | 0 / 4 | 1–4 | 20% |
| Wimbledon | A | 2R | 2R | F | 2R | 0 / 4 | 8–4 | 67% |
| US Open | A | A | 2R | 1R | 1R | 0 / 3 | 1–3 | 25% |
| Win–loss | 1–1 | 7–2 | 4–4 | 5–4 | 1–4 | 1 / 12 | 17–11 | 61% |
| Year-end championship | | | | | | | | |
| ATP Finals | DNQ | RR | DNQ | | | 0 / 1 | 0–3 | 0% |
| ATP Masters 1000 | | | | | | | | |
| Indian Wells Masters | A | 1R | A | A | A | 0 / 1 | 0–1 | 0% |
| Miami Open | A | 1R | 1R | A | 1R | 0 / 3 | 0–3 | 0% |
| Cincinnati Masters | A | 1R | A | A | A | 0 / 1 | 0–1 | 0% |
| Shanghai Masters | NH | SF | A | A | A | 0 / 1 | 3–1 | 75% |
| Win–loss | 0–0 | 3–4 | 0–1 | 0–0 | 0–1 | 0 / 6 | 3–6 | 33% |
| Career statistics | | | | | | | | |
| Tournaments | 2 | 16 | 14 | 11 | 9 | Career total: 52 | | |
| Titles | 0 | 2 | 0 | 0 | 0 | Career total: 2 | | |
| Finals | 0 | 3 | 1 | 0 | 0 | Career total: 4 | | |
| Overall win–loss | 1–2 | 20–15 | 12–13 | 11–10 | 7–10 | 51–50 | | 50% |
| Year-end ranking | 278 | 23 | 96 | 58 | | | | |

== Grand Slam tournament finals ==
=== Doubles: 2 (1 title, 1 runner-up) ===
| Result | Year | Tournament | Surface | Partner | Opponents | Score |
|---|---|---|---|---|---|---|
| Win | 2023 | Australian Open | Hard | (Australia) Jason Kubler | (Monaco) Hugo Nys (Poland) Jan Zieliński | 6–4, 7–6^{(7–4)} |
| Loss | 2025 | Wimbledon | Grass | (Netherlands) David Pel | (United Kingdom) Julian Cash (United Kingdom) Lloyd Glasspool | 2–6, 6–7^{(3–7)} |

== ATP Tour finals ==
=== Doubles: 5 (2 titles, 3 runner-ups) ===
| Legend Grand Slam (1–1) ATP Finals (–) ATP 1000 (–) ATP 500 (1–0) ATP 250 (0–2) | Finals by surface Hard (2–2) Clay (–) Grass (0–1) | Finals by setting Outdoor (2–2) Indoor (0–1) |

| Result | W–L | Date | Tournament | Tier | Surface | Partner | Opponents | Score |
|---|---|---|---|---|---|---|---|---|
| Win | 1–0 | Jan 2023 | Australian Open, Australia | Grand Slam | Hard | (Australia) Jason Kubler | (Monaco) Hugo Nys (Poland) Jan Zieliński | 6–4, 7–6^{(7–4)} |
| Loss | 1–1 | Feb 2023 | Delray Beach Open, US | ATP 250 | Hard | (United States) Reese Stalder | (El Salvador) Marcelo Arévalo (Netherlands) Jean-Julien Rojer | 3–6, 4–6 |
| Win | 2–1 | Oct 2023 | Japan Open, Japan | ATP 500 | Hard | (Australia) Max Purcell | (United Kingdom) Jamie Murray (New Zealand) Michael Venus | 6–4, 6–1 |
| Loss | 2–2 | Feb 2024 | Dallas Open, US | ATP 250 | Hard (i) | (United States) William Blumberg | (Australia) Max Purcell (Australia) Jordan Thompson | 4–6, 6–2, [8–10] |
| Loss | 2–3 | Jul 2025 | Wimbledon, UK | Grand Slam | Grass | (Netherlands) David Pel | (United Kingdom) Julian Cash (United Kingdom) Lloyd Glasspool | 2–6, 6–7^{(3–7)} |

== ATP Challenger Tour finals ==
=== Singles: 6 (4 titles, 2 runner-ups) ===
| Legend ATP Challenger Tour (4–2) | Finals by surface Hard (4–2) Clay (–) |

| Result | W–L | Date | Tournament | Tier | Surface | Opponent | Score |
|---|---|---|---|---|---|---|---|
| Win | 1–0 | Oct 2022 | Playford Tennis International, Australia | Challenger | Hard | (Japan) Rio Noguchi | 6–1, 6–1 |
| Win | 2–0 | Feb 2023 | Burnie International, Australia | Challenger | Hard | (Australia) James Duckworth | 6–3, 6–3 |
| Loss | 2–1 | Sep 2023 | Cary Challenger II, US | Challenger | Hard | (United States) Zachary Svajda | 6–7^{(3–7)}, 6–4, 1–6 |
| Win | 3–1 | Oct 2024 | Playford Tennis International, Australia (2) | Challenger | Hard | (Japan) Yuta Shimizu | 6–4, 7–6^{(7–4)} |
| Loss | 3–2 | Oct 2024 | NSW Open, Australia | Challenger | Hard | (Australia) Thanasi Kokkinakis | 1–6, 1–6 |
| Win | 4–2 | Nov 2025 | Playford Tennis International, Australia (3) | Challenger | Hard | (Australia) Dane Sweeny | 6–0, 6–7^{(8–10)}, 6–4 |

=== Doubles: 4 (3 titles, 1 runner-up) ===
| Legend ATP Challenger Tour (3–1) | Finals by surface Hard (3–1) Clay (–) |

| Result | W–L | Date | Tournament | Tier | Surface | Partner | Opponents | Score |
|---|---|---|---|---|---|---|---|---|
| Win | 1–0 | Sep 2023 | Cary Challenger II, US | Challenger | Hard | (Australia) Andrew Harris | (United States) William Blumberg (Venezuela) Luis David Martínez | 6–4, 3–6, [10–6] |
| Loss | 1–1 | Mar 2024 | Arizona Tennis Classic, US | Challenger | Hard | (United Kingdom) Henry Patten | (France) Sadio Doumbia (France) Fabien Reboul | 3–6, 2–6 |
| Win | 2–1 | Oct 2025 | Sioux Falls Challenger, US | Challenger | Hard (i) | (United States) Mac Kiger | (United States) Andrew Fenty (Venezuela) Juan José Bianchi | 6–4, 6–4 |
| Win | 3–1 | Nov 2025 | NSW Open, Australia | Challenger | Hard | (Australia) Marc Polmans | (Australia) Calum Puttergill (Australia) Dane Sweeny | 6–0, 6–4 |

== ITF World Tennis Tour finals ==
=== Singles: 10 (7 titles, 3 runner-ups) ===
| Legend ITF WTT (7–3) | Finals by surface Hard (6–3) Clay (1–0) |

| Result | W–L | Date | Tournament | Tier | Surface | Opponent | Score |
|---|---|---|---|---|---|---|---|
| Win | 1–0 | Sep 2019 | M15 Fayetteville, US | WTT | Hard | (United States) Nick Chappell | 2–6, 6–2, 6–1 |
| Win | 2–0 | Jul 2021 | M15 Monastir, Tunisia | WTT | Hard | (Monaco) Valentin Vacherot | 6–3, 6–1 |
| Win | 3–0 | Jul 2021 | M15 Edwardsville, US | WTT | Hard | (United States) Strong Kirchheimer | 6–3, 6–1 |
| Win | 4–0 | Sep 2021 | M25 Sierre, Switzerland | WTT | Clay | (United States) Oliver Crawford | 7–6, 6–1 |
| Loss | 4–1 | Oct 2021 | M25 Setúbal, Portugal | WTT | Hard | (France) Arthur Cazaux | 5–7, 0–6 |
| Win | 5–1 | Oct 2021 | M25 Calabasas, US | WTT | Hard | (United States) Tristan Boyer | 3–6, 7–5, 6–2 |
| Loss | 5–2 | Mar 2022 | M25 Santo Domingo, Dominican Republic | WTT | Hard | (France) Geoffrey Blancaneaux | 6–3, 2–6, 2–6 |
| Win | 6–2 | Mar 2022 | M25 Bakersfield, US | WTT | Hard | (United States) Keegan Smith | 6–1, 7–5 |
| Win | 7–2 | Mar 2022 | M25 Calabasas, US | WTT | Hard | (United Kingdom) Charles Broom | 7–5, 6–2 |
| Loss | 7–3 | Aug 2022 | M25 Columbus, US | WTT | Hard | (United States) Murphy Cassone | 3–6, 0–6 |

=== Doubles: 3 (2 titles, 1 runner-up) ===
| Legend ITF WTT (2–1) |

| Result | W–L | Date | Tournament | Tier | Surface | Partner | Opponents | Score |
|---|---|---|---|---|---|---|---|---|
| Loss | 0–1 | Jul 2021 | M15 Monastir, Tunisia | WTT | Hard | (Australia) Kody Pearson | (United States) Jacob Brumm (Denmark) August Holmgren | 5–7, 6–7 |
| Win | 1–1 | Oct 2021 | M25 Loulé, Portugal | WTT | Hard | (Netherlands) Mick Veldheer | (Portugal) Gonçalo Falcão (Slovenia) Tomás Lipovšek Puches | 6–2, 6–3 |
| Win | 2–1 | Feb 2022 | M25 Santo Domingo, Dominican Republic | WTT | Hard | (United Kingdom) Henry Patten | (Chinese Taipei) Hsu Yu-hsiou (Chinese Taipei) Wu Tung-lin | 2–6, 7–6^{(7–4)}, [10–3] |

== ITF Junior Circuit ==
=== Singles: 4 (2–2) ===
Legend
Category GA (0–0)
Category G1 (0–2)
Category G2 (1–0)
Category G3 (1–0)
Category G4 (0–0)
Category G5 (0–0)

| Result | W–L | Date | Tournament | Category | Surface | Opponent | Score |
|---|---|---|---|---|---|---|---|
| Win | 1–0 | Oct 2017 | 30th Sarawak Chief Minister's Cup, Malaysia | Category G3 | Hard | (India) Digvijay Pratap Singh | 7–6^{(7–5)}, 6–3 |
| Win | 2–0 | Aug 2018 | Oceania Closed Junior Championships, Fiji | Category G2 | Hard | (Australia) Tristan Schoolkate | 6–2, 6–4 |
| Loss | 2–1 | Sep 2018 | Les Internationaux de Tennis Junior Banque Nationale du Canada, Canada | Category G1 | Hard | (France) Hugo Gaston | 3–6, 4–6 |
| Loss | 2–2 | Nov 2018 | 2018 Seogwipo Asia/Oceania Closed Junior Championships, South Korea | Category G1 | Hard | (China) Bu Yunchaokete | 3–6, 1–6 |

=== Doubles: 10 (6–4) ===
Legend
Category GA (0–1)
Category G1 (3–2)
Category G2 (1–0)
Category G3 (1–1)
Category G4 (1–0)
Category G5 (0–0)

| Result | W–L | Date | Tournament | Category | Surface | Partner | Opponents | Score |
|---|---|---|---|---|---|---|---|---|
| Loss | 0–1 | Feb 2017 | NZ ITF Summer Championships 2017, New Zealand | Category G3 | Hard | (Australia) Kody Pearson | (Australia) Thomas Bosancic (Australia) Benard Bruno Nkomba | 3–6, 0–6 |
| Win | 1–1 | Aug 2017 | AS Open 2017, Slovenia | Category G4 | Clay | (Australia) Dane Sweeny | (Switzerland) Brian Bencic (Bosnia and Herzegovina) Nemanja Malesevic | 6–4, 6–3 |
| Win | 2–1 | Sep 2017 | 3rd Torneo Internazionale Junior "Citta' Di Palermo", Italy | Category G3 | Clay | (Australia) Dane Sweeny | (Estonia) Daniil Glinka (Latvia) Roberts Grinvalds | 6–1, 6–4 |
| Loss | 2–2 | Jan 2018 | AGL Loy Yang Traralgon Junior International, Australia | Category G1 | Hard | (Japan) Taisei Ichikawa | (Poland) Wojciech Marek (Chinese Taipei) Tseng Chun-hsin | 6–7^{(1–7)}, 4–6 |
| Loss | 2–3 | Jun 2018 | 54th Astrid Bowl Charleroi, Belgium | Category G1 | Clay | (Japan) Naoki Tajima | (Ukraine) Pavel Shumeiko (Germany) Henri Squire | 6–7^{(5–7)}, 3–6 |
| Win | 3–3 | Jun 2018 | 26th Internat. Nürnberger Versicherungs-ITF-Junior Tournament, Germany | Category G1 | Clay | (Switzerland) Yannik Steinegger | (Romania) Filip Cristian Jianu (China) Tao Mu | 6–3, 2–6, [10-7] |
| Win | 4–3 | Aug 2018 | Oceania Closed Junior Championships, Fiji | Category G2 | Hard | (Australia) Ken Cavrak | (Australia) Cihan Akay (Australia) Nikita Volonski | 6–4, 6–3 |
| Loss | 4–4 | Oct 2018 | Youth Olympic Games, Argentina | Category GA | Clay | (Bulgaria) Adrian Andreev | (Argentina) Sebastián Báez (Argentina) Facundo Díaz Acosta | 4–6, 4–6 |
| Win | 5–4 | Nov 2018 | 2018 Seogwipo Asia/Oceania Closed Junior Championships, South Korea | Category G1 | Hard | (Australia) Chen Dong | (Australia) Stefan Storch (Australia) Dane Sweeny | 6–3, 6–4 |
| Win | 6–4 | Jan 2019 | J1 Traralgon, Australia | Category J1 | Hard | (Finland) Otto Virtanen | (Czech Republic) Jiří Lehečka (Poland) Wojciech Marek | 6–0, 6–3 |

== Wins against top-10 players ==
- Hijikata has a 1–12 (7.69%) match record against players who were, at the time the match was played, ranked in the top 10.

| Season | 2026 | Total |
|---|---|---|
| Wins | 1 | 1 |

| # | Player | Rk | Event | Surface | Rd | Score | Rk | Ref |
|---|---|---|---|---|---|---|---|---|
2026
| 1. | (Kazakhstan) Alexander Bublik | 10 | Indian Wells Open, United States | Hard | 3R | 6–7^{(3–7)}, 7–6^{(7–3)}, 6–3 | 117 | |

*As of 9 March 2026

== Awards ==
In 2018 and 2019, Hijikata won the Newcombe Medal for Male Junior Athlete of the Year.
