= Blake Ellis (tennis) =

Australian tennis player (born 1999)

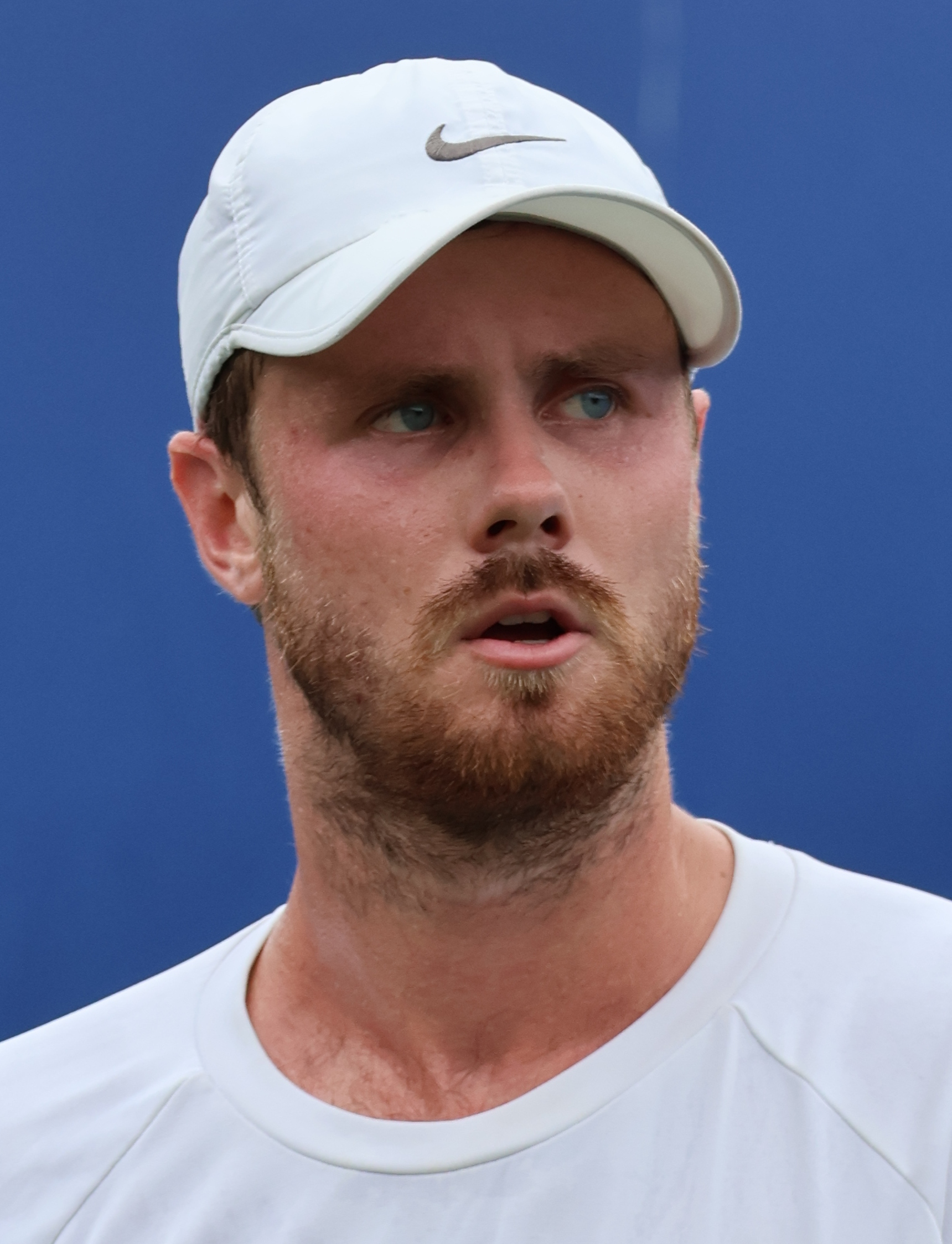
- Ellis in 2023
- Country (sports): Australia
- Residence: Brisbane, Australia
- Born: 6 January 1999 (age 27) Brisbane, Australia
- Height: 1.91 m (6 ft 3 in)
- Turned pro: 2014
- Plays: Right-handed (two handed-backhand)
- Coach: Brent Larkham
- Prize money: US $353,529

Singles
- Career record: 0–0
- Career titles: 0
- Highest ranking: No. 271 (7 April 2025)
- Current ranking: No. 412 (2 October 2026)

Grand Slam singles results
- Australian Open: Q3 (2025)

Doubles
- Career record: 3–6
- Career titles: 5 Challenger, 12 ITF
- Highest ranking: No. 138 (4 November 2024)
- Current ranking: No. 1,553 (2 October 2026)

Grand Slam doubles results
- Australian Open: 3R (2019)
- Last updated on: 8 October 2026.

Blake Ellis (born 6 January 1999) is an Australian tennis player. He has a career-high ATP singles ranking of No. 271 achieved on 7 April 2025 and a doubles ranking of No. 138 achieved on 4 November 2024.

Ellis won the 2016 Australian Open boys' doubles alongside Alex de Minaur.

== Career ==
=== 2014–2018: Professional debut ===
Ellis made his senior debut in October 2014 at the Australia F7, where he lost in round one. Between 2015 and 2017, he competed in the ITF Men's Circuit around Australia, Asia and Europe, with his best result being a semifinal appearance in August 2017 in the Thailand F6 Futures tournament in Nonthaburi.

In October 2017, Ellis won his first Challenger match against Austrian Lucas Mielder in the Canberra International.

At the 2018 Shimadzu All Japan Indoor Tennis Championships, Ellis had his best Challenger-level performance to date, winning his qualifying matches then defeating two previous tournament champions in fifth seed Tatsuma Ito and third seed Go Soeda en route to a semifinal loss against fellow Australian and eventual champion John Millman.

=== 2021 ===
In October 2021, Ellis won his fifth ITF doubles title and third for the season.

=== 2024: First ITF title and career high ranking ===
Ellis won four ATP Challenger doubles titles in 2024 including in Playford, South Australia, and in Sydney, New South Wales, in consecutive weeks alongside Thomas Fancutt. He won his first ITF title in November in Brisbane against Blake Mott to attain a career-high ranking of No. 319. He finished the year ranked 338.

=== 2025: Australian Open Qualifying wildcard ===
After a great season in 2024, Ellis was awarded a wildcard to compete in the 2025 Australian Open qualifying competition, aiming to reach a Grand Slam main draw for the first time. However, he fell short losing to Dominik Koepfer in a close 5-7, 5-7 match. Despite losing the opportunity to compete for a singles grand slam he did play with his partner Thomas Fancutt in the doubles main draw of the Australian Open but the doubles team made an exit in the first round.

== Performance timeline ==
Key
| W | F | SF | QF | #R | RR | Q# | DNQ | A | NH |

(W) winner; (F) finalist; (SF) semifinalist; (QF) quarterfinalist; (#R) rounds 4, 3, 2, 1; (RR) round-robin stage; (Q#) qualification round; (DNQ) did not qualify; (A) absent; (NH) not held; (SR) strike rate (events won / competed); (W–L) win–loss record.
To avoid confusion and double counting, these charts are updated at the conclusion of a tournament or when the player's participation has ended.

=== Singles ===
| Tournament | 2018 | 2019 | 2020 | 2021 | 2022 | 2023 | 2024 | 2025 | 2026 | SR | W–L | Win % |
|---|---|---|---|---|---|---|---|---|---|---|---|---|
Grand Slam tournaments
| Australian Open | Q1 | Q1 | A | A | A | A | A | Q3 | Q1 | 0 / 0 | 0–0 | – |
| French Open | A | A | A | A | A | A | A | A | | 0 / 0 | 0–0 | – |
| Wimbledon | A | A | NH | A | A | A | A | A | | 0 / 0 | 0–0 | – |
| US Open | A | A | A | A | A | A | A | A | | 0 / 0 | 0–0 | – |
| Win–loss | 0–0 | 0–0 | 0–0 | 0–0 | 0–0 | 0–0 | 0–0 | 0–0 | 0–0 | 0 / 0 | 0–0 | – |
ATP Masters 1000
| Indian Wells Masters | A | A | NH | A | A | A | A | A | | 0 / 0 | 0–0 | – |
| Miami Open | A | A | NH | A | A | A | A | A | | 0 / 0 | 0–0 | – |
| Monte Carlo Masters | A | A | NH | A | A | A | A | A | | 0 / 0 | 0–0 | – |
| Madrid Open | A | A | NH | A | A | A | A | A | | 0 / 0 | 0-0 | – |
| Italian Open | A | A | A | A | A | A | A | A | | 0 / 0 | 0–0 | – |
| Canadian Open | A | A | NH | A | A | A | A | A | | 0 / 0 | 0–0 | – |
| Cincinnati Masters | A | A | A | A | A | A | A | A | | 0 / 0 | 0–0 | – |
| Shanghai Masters | A | A | NH | | | A | A | A | | 0 / 0 | 0–0 | – |
| Paris Masters | A | A | A | A | A | A | A | A | | 0 / 0 | 0–0 | – |
| Win–loss | 0–0 | 0–0 | 0–0 | 0–0 | 0–0 | 0–0 | 0–0 | 0–0 | 0–0 | 0 / 0 | 0–0 | – |

== ITF Circuit finals ==
=== Singles: 9 (2 titles, 6 runner-ups) ===
| Legend (singles) ATP Challenger Tour (0–0) Futures/ ITF World Tennis Tour (2–7) | Finals by surface Hard (2–7) Clay (0–0) Grass (0–0) Carpet (0–0) |

| Result | W–L | Date | Tournament | Tier | Surface | Opponent | Score |
|---|---|---|---|---|---|---|---|
| Loss | 0–1 | Oct 2022 | M25 Mysuru, India | World Tennis Tour | Hard | (United Kingdom) George Loffhagen | 6–4, 2–6, 6–7^{(4–7)} |
| Loss | 0–2 | Sep 2023 | M25 Darwin, Australia | World Tennis Tour | Hard | (Australia) Blake Mott | 4–6, 1–6 |
| Loss | 0–3 | Nov 2023 | M25 Brisbane, Australia | World Tennis Tour | Hard | (Japan) Shintaro Imai | 4–6, 6–7^{(3–7)} |
| Loss | 0–4 | Jul 2024 | M25 Ajaccio, France | World Tennis Tour | Hard | (France) Jules Marie | 2–6, 4–6 |
| Loss | 0–5 | Aug 2024 | M25 Taipei, Chinese Taipei | World Tennis Tour | Hard | (Chinese Taipei) Hsu Yu-hsiou | 3–6, 4–6 |
| Loss | 0–6 | Oct 2024 | M25 Cairns, Australia | World Tennis Tour | Hard | (Japan) Rio Noguchi | 7–6^{(7–5)}, 4–6, 6–7^{(4–7)} |
| Win | 1–6 | Nov 2024 | M25 Brisbane, Australia | World Tennis Tour | Hard | (Australia) Blake Mott | 6–1, 6–3 |
| Win | 2–6 | Mar 2025 | M25 Swan Hill, Australia | World Tennis Tour | Hard | (Australia) Dane Sweeny | 2–6, 6–3, 7–6^{(7–4)} |
| Loss | 2–7 | Oct 2026 | M25 Tamworth, Australia | World Tennis Tour | Hard | (New Zealand) Isaac Becroft | 6–7^{(2–7)}, 7–5, 5–7 |

=== Doubles: 37 (19 titles, 18 runner-ups) ===
| Legend (doubles) ATP Challenger Tour (7–2) $25,000 tournaments (9–11) $15,000 tournaments (3–5) | Finals by surface Hard (18–17) Clay (0–1) Grass (1–0) Carpet (0–0) |

| Result | No. | Date | Level | Tournament | Surface | Partner | Opponents | Score |
|---|---|---|---|---|---|---|---|---|
| Win | 1. | 29 Sep 2017 | $25,000 | Brisbane, Australia | Hard | (Australia) Maverick Banes | (United States) Nathan Pasha (Australia) Darren Polkinghorne | 4–6, 6–1, [10–4] |
| Loss | 1. | 11 Nov 2017 | $15,000 | Thủ Dầu Một, Vietnam | Hard | (Australia) Michael Look | (Japan) Sho Katayama (Japan) Arata Onozawa | 6–7^{(5–7)}, 4–6 |
| Loss | 2. | 30 Mar 2018 | $25,000 | Mornington, Australia | Clay | (Australia) Michael Look | (Australia) Adam Taylor (Australia) Jason Taylor | 6–7^{(4–7)}, 4–6 |
| Win | 2. | 14 Oct 2018 | $25,000 | Toowoomba, Australia | Hard | (Australia) Luke Saville | (United Kingdom) Brydan Klein (Australia) Scott Puodziunas | 6–4, 6–7^{(2–7)}, [10–2] |
| Loss | 3. | 9 Mar 2019 | M15 | Nishitama, Japan | Hard | (Thailand) Wishaya Trongcharoenchaikul | (Japan) Shintaro Imai (Japan) Takuto Niki | 6–1, 6–7^{(8–10)}, [5–10] |
| Loss | 4. | 23 Mar 2019 | M15 | Kōfu, Japan | Hard | (Australia) Michael Look | (Japan) Hiroyasu Ehara (Japan) Sho Katayama | 2–6, 4–6 |
| Loss | 5. | 30 Mar 2019 | M15 | Tsukuba, Japan | Hard | (Australia) Michael Look | (Chinese Taipei) Hsu Yu-hsiou (Japan) Shintaro Imai | 6–1, 1–6, [7–10] |
| Loss | 6. | 8 Jun 2019 | M25 | Hong Kong | Hard | (Vietnam) Lý Hoàng Nam | (Japan) Shintaro Imai (Japan) Yuta Shimizu | 4–6, 4–6 |
| Win | 3. | 7 Aug 2021 | M15 | Monastir, Tunisia | Hard | (New Zealand) Ajeet Rai | (Japan) Taisei Ichikawa (Japan) Seita Watanabe | 6–2, 6–3 |
| Win | 4. | 21 Aug 2021 | M15 | Monastir, Tunisia | Hard | (Australia) Dane Sweeny | (Kazakhstan) Timur Khabibulin (Kazakhstan) Beibit Zhukayev | 7–6, 6–1 |
| Loss | 7. | 2 Oct 2021 | M25 | Falun, Sweden | Hard (indoor) | (Japan) Renta Tokuda | (Japan) Yuta Shimizu (Uzbekistan) Khumoyun Sultanov | 3–6, 6–3, [9–11] |
| Win | 5. | 10 Oct 2021 | M25 | Nevers, France | Hard (indoor) | (Australia) Tristan Schoolkate | (United Kingdom) Millen Hurrion (United Kingdom) Ben Jones | 5–7, 7–6^{(7–5)}, [10–8] |
| Win | 6. | 31 Oct 2021 | M25 | Sarreguemines, France | Hard (indoor) | (Australia) Tristan Schoolkate | (France) Constantin Bittoun Kouzmine (Germany) Hendrik Jebens | 7–6^{(7–5)}, 3–6, [10–5] |
| Loss | 8. | 7 Nov 2021 | M25 | Saint-Dizier, France | Hard (indoor) | (Australia) Tristan Schoolkate | (Bulgaria) Alexander Donski (Greece) Petros Tsitsipas | 4–6, 6–4 [7-10] |
| Loss | 9. | 14 Nov 2021 | M25 | Villers-lès-Nancy, France | Hard (indoor) | (Australia) Tristan Schoolkate | (Bulgaria) Alexander Donski (Greece) Petros Tsitsipas | 6-7, 2–3 (ret.) |
| Loss | 10. | Feb 2022 | M25 | Bendigo, Australia | Hard | (Australia) Tristan Schoolkate | (Australia) Calum Puttergill (Australia) Brandon Walkin | 2-6, 3–6 |
| Win | 7. | Oct 2022 | M25 | Cairns, Australia | Hard | (Australia) Tristan Schoolkate | (Australia) Calum Puttergill (Australia) Aaron Addison | 6-4, 6–1 |
| Win | 8. | Oct 2022 | Challenger | Sydney, Australia | Hard | (Australia) Tristan Schoolkate | (New Zealand) Ajeet Rai (Japan) Yuta Shimizu | 4–6, 7–5, [11–9] |
| Loss | 11. | March 2023 | M25 | Swan Hill, Australia | Hard | (Australia) Matthew Christopher Romios | (Australia) Tristan Schoolkate (Australia) Luke Saville | 3-6, 4–6 |
| Win | 9. | March 2023 | M25 | Lucknow, India | Hard | (Japan) Shuichi Sekiguchi | (India) Parikshit Somani (India) Manish Sureshkumar | 6-2, 6–7^{(4–7)}, [10–8] |
| Loss | 12. | June 2023 | M15 | Nakhon Si Thammarat, Thailand | Hard | (Australia) Blake Bayldon | (Japan) Shinji Hazawa (Japan) Ryotaro Taguchi | 4-6, 5–7 |
| Loss | 13. | Jul 2023 | Challenger | Bloomfield Hills, United States | Hard | (Australia) Calum Puttergill | (Australia) Tristan Schoolkate (Australia) Adam Walton | 5–7, 3–6 |
| Loss | 14. | Sep 2023 | M25 | Darwin, Australia | Hard | (Australia) Joshua Charlton | (Australia) Jeremy Beale (Australia) Thomas Fancutt | 4-6, 4–6 |
| Loss | 15. | Oct 2023 | Challenger | Playford, Australia | Hard | (Australia) Tristan Schoolkate | (United States) Ryan Seggerman (United States) Patrik Trhac | 3–6, 6–7^{(3–7)} |
| Loss | 16. | Feb 2024 | M25 | Traralgon, Australia | Hard | (Australia) Joshua Charlton | (Australia) Matt Hulme (New Zealand) James Watt | 3–6, 6–7^{(4–7)} |
| Win | 10. | March 2024 | M25 | Traralgon, Australia | Hard | (Australia) Joshua Charlton | (Australia) Jesse Delaney (New Zealand) Ajeet Rai | 6–1, 6–3 |
| Win | 11. | March 2024 | M25 | Mildura, Australia | Grass | (Australia) Joshua Charlton | (Australia) Matt Hulme (New Zealand) James Watt | 6–4, 6–7^{(4–7)}, [10–4] |
| Win | 12. | May 2024 | Challenger | Guangzhou, China | Hard | (Australia) Tristan Schoolkate | (South Korea) Nam Ji-sung (Finland) Patrik Niklas-Salminen | 6–2, 6–7^{(4–7)}, [10–4] |
| Win | 13. | July 2024 | M25 | Ajaccio, France | Hard | (Zimbabwe) Benjamin Lock | (France) Yanis Ghazouani Durand (France) Loann Massard | 3–6, 6–4, [10–5] |
| Loss | 17. | July 2024 | M25 | Nottingham, Great Britain | Hard | (Australia) Joshua Charlton | (United Kingdom) James Davis (United Kingdom) Matthew Summers | 3–6, 4–6 |
| Win | 14. | Sep 2024 | M15 | Bali, Indonesia | Hard | (Indonesia) Nathan Anthony Barki | (Japan) Tomohiro Masabayashi (Japan) Taiyo Yamanaka | 3–6, 7–6^{(7–2)}, [10–8] |
| Win | 15. | Sep 2024 | Challenger | Nonthaburi, Thailand | Hard | (Australia) Adam Walton | (India) Rithvik Choudary Bollipalli (India) Arjun Kadhe | 3–6, 7–5, [10–8] |
| Loss | 18. | Oct 2024 | M25 | Cairns, Australia | Hard | (Australia) Joshua Charlton | (Australia) Matt Hulme (New Zealand) James Watt | 3–6, 7–6^{(7–5)}, [7–10] |
| Win | 17. | Oct 2024 | Challenger | Playford, Australia | Hard | (Australia) Thomas Fancutt | (Australia) Jake Delaney (Australia) Jesse Delaney | 6–1, 5–7, [10–5] |
| Win | 18. | Oct 2024 | Challenger | Sydney, Australia | Hard | (Australia) Thomas Fancutt | (Australia) Blake Bayldon (Netherlands) Mats Hermans | 7–5, 7–6^{(7–4)} |
| Win | 19. | Nov 2026 | Challenger | Brisbane, Australia | Hard | (Australia) Li Tu | (United States) Alafia Ayeni (Japan) Kokoro Isomura | 6–7^{(4–7)}, 6–4, [12–10] |

== Junior Grand Slam finals ==
=== Doubles: 1 (1 title) ===
| Result | Year | Tournament | Surface | Partner | Opponents | Score |
|---|---|---|---|---|---|---|
| Win | 2016 | Australian Open | Hard | (Australia) Alex de Minaur | (Slovakia) Lukáš Klein (Czech Republic) Patrik Rikl | 3–6, 7–5, [12–10] |
