= 2019 City of Playford Tennis International II – Women's doubles =

Women's doubles
- 2019 City of Playford Tennis International II

Final
- Champions: (United States) Asia Muhammad (Australia) Storm Sanders
- Runners-up: (United Kingdom) Naiktha Bains (Slovakia) Tereza Mihalíková
- Score: 6–3, 6–4

Events
Singles	men	women
Doubles	men	women
← 2019 ·	City of Playford Tennis International	· 2022 →

Giulia Gatto-Monticone and Anastasia Grymalska were the defending champions but chose not to participate.

Asia Muhammad and Storm Sanders won the title, defeating Naiktha Bains and Tereza Mihalíková in the final, 6–3, 6–4.

== Seeds ==
1. (United States) Asia Muhammad / (Australia) Storm Sanders (champions)
2. (Japan) Mana Ayukawa / (Australia) Alison Bai (semifinals)
3. (United Kingdom) Naiktha Bains / (Slovakia) Tereza Mihalíková (final)
4. (Japan) Erina Hayashi / (Japan) Kyōka Okamura (first round)

== Draw ==
=== Key ===
- Q = Qualifier
- WC = Wild card
- LL = Lucky loser
- Alt = Alternate
- SE = Special exempt
- PR = Protected ranking
- ITF = ITF entry
- JE = Junior exempt
- w/o = Walkover
- r = Retired
- d = Defaulted
- SR = Special ranking

=== Draw ===
First round
(Australia) A Parnaby (Australia) A Smith	4	2
(Australia) A Myers (Australia) B Woolcock	6	6
4	(Japan) E Hayashi (Japan) K Okamura	4	6	[10]
(Japan) M Imanishi (Japan) H Kuwata	6	3	[12]
(New Zealand) M Barry (Australia) E Bowell	4	2
(Japan) H Arakawa (Japan) A Shimizu	6	6
(Australia) I Bozicevic (Australia) A Poulos	6^{3}	7^{7}	[9]
(Australia) L Ashley (Australia) T Lawless	7^{7}	6^{3}	[11]
(Australia) M Inglis (Australia) K McPhee
3	(United Kingdom) N Bains (Slovakia) T Mihalíková	w/o
(Australia) A Bozovic (Australia) A Marshall	6	4	[10]
(Australia) G Da Silva-Fick (Slovakia) Z Zlochová	2	6	[6]
(Australia) N Ah San (Australia) M Frahn	0	2
2	(Japan) M Ayukawa (Australia) A Bai	6	6

Quarterfinals
1	(United States) A Muhammad (Australia) S Sanders	w/o
(Australia) A Myers (Australia) B Woolcock
(Japan) M Imanishi (Japan) H Kuwata	6	6
(Japan) H Arakawa (Japan) A Shimizu	1	3
(Australia) L Ashley (Australia) T Lawless	1	1
3	(United Kingdom) N Bains (Slovakia) T Mihalíková	6	6
(Australia) A Bozovic (Australia) A Marshall	4	1
2	(Japan) M Ayukawa (Australia) A Bai	6	6

Semifinals
1	(United States) A Muhammad (Australia) S Sanders	6	6
(Japan) M Imanishi (Japan) H Kuwata	1	1
3	(United Kingdom) N Bains (Slovakia) T Mihalíková	6	6
2	(Japan) M Ayukawa (Australia) A Bai	4	3

Final
1	(United States) A Muhammad (Australia) S Sanders	6	6
3	(United Kingdom) N Bains (Slovakia) T Mihalíková	3	4
