= 2019 City of Playford Tennis International II =

- Date: 28 October–3 November 2019
- Edition: 3rd
- Category: ATP Challenger Tour; ITF Women's World Tennis Tour
- Prize money: $54,160 (men) $60,000 (women)
- Surface: Hard
- Location: City of Playford, Australia

Champions

Men's singles
- (Australia) James Duckworth

Women's singles
- (Australia) Storm Sanders

Men's doubles
- (Finland) Harri Heliövaara / (Finland) Patrik Niklas-Salminen

Women's doubles
- (United States) Asia Muhammad / (Australia) Storm Sanders
← 2019 ·	City of Playford Tennis International	· 2022 →

The 2019 City of Playford Tennis International II was a professional tennis tournament played on outdoor hard courts. It was the third edition of the tournament which was part of the 2019 ATP Challenger Tour and the 2019 ITF Women's World Tennis Tour. It took place in the City of Playford, Australia between 28 October and 3 November 2019.

== Men's singles main-draw entrants ==
=== Seeds ===
Country	Player	Rank^{1}	Seed
JPN	Yasutaka Uchiyama	87	1
AUS	James Duckworth	133	2
JPN	Tatsuma Ito	137	3
AUS	Marc Polmans	154	4
AUS	Alex Bolt	155	5
AUS	Andrew Harris	189	6
GBR	Jay Clarke	194	7
CHI	Alejandro Tabilo	216	8
AUS	Max Purcell	229	9
IND	Sasikumar Mukund	236	10
JPN	Hiroki Moriya	242	11
AUS	Akira Santillan	245	12
AUS	Aleksandar Vukic	253	13
JPN	Shuichi Sekiguchi	278	14
JPN	Yosuke Watanuki	293	15
AUS	Harry Bourchier	305	16

=== Other entrants ===
The following players received wildcards into the singles main draw:

- (Australia) Matthew Dellavedova
- (Australia) Calum Puttergill
- (Australia) Tristan Schoolkate
- (Australia) Dane Sweeny
- (Australia) Brandon Walkin

The following player received entry into the singles main draw using a protected ranking:

- (Australia) Bradley Mousley

The following players received entry from the qualifying draw:

- (Australia) Mislav Bosnjak
- (Australia) James Ibrahim

== Women's singles main-draw entrants ==
=== Seeds ===
Country	Player	Rank^{1}	Seed
AUS	Priscilla Hon	118	1
AUS	Maddison Inglis	145	2
AUS	Lizette Cabrera	154	3
AUS	Kaylah McPhee	204	4
USA	Asia Muhammad	224	5
AUS	Olivia Rogowska	247	6
JPN	Ayano Shimizu	258	7
GBR	Naiktha Bains	278	8

- ^{1} Rankings are as of 21 October 2019.

=== Other entrants ===
The following players received wildcards into the singles main draw:

- (Australia) Isabella Bozicevic
- (Australia) Taylah Lawless
- (Australia) Annerly Poulos
- (Australia) Storm Sanders

The following players received entry from the qualifying draw:

- (Japan) Mana Ayukawa
- (Australia) Alison Bai
- (Australia) Alexandra Bozovic
- (Australia) Gabriella Da Silva-Fick
- (United States) Jennifer Elie
- (Australia) Amber Marshall
- (Australia) Alana Parnaby
- (Australia) Alicia Smith

== Champions ==
=== Men's singles ===
- (Australia) James Duckworth def. (Japan) Yasutaka Uchiyama 7–6^{(7–2)}, 6–4.

=== Women's singles ===
- (Australia) Storm Sanders def. (Australia) Lizette Cabrera, 6–3, 6–4

=== Men's doubles ===
- (Finland) Harri Heliövaara / (Finland) Patrik Niklas-Salminen def. (Philippines) Ruben Gonzales / (United States) Evan King 6–4, 6–7^{(4–7)}, [10–7].

=== Women's doubles ===
- (United States) Asia Muhammad / (Australia) Storm Sanders def. (United Kingdom) Naiktha Bains / (Slovakia) Tereza Mihalíková, 6–3, 6–4
