= 2019 City of Playford Tennis International II – Women's singles =

Women's singles
- 2019 City of Playford Tennis International II

Final
- Champion: (Australia) Storm Sanders
- Runner-up: (Australia) Lizette Cabrera
- Score: 6–3, 6–4

Events
Singles	men	women
Doubles	men	women
← 2019 ·	City of Playford Tennis International	· 2022 →

Anna Kalinskaya was the defending champion, but chose not to participate.

Storm Sanders won the title, defeating Lizette Cabrera in an all-Australian final, 6–3, 6–4.

== Seeds ==
1. (Australia) Priscilla Hon (second round)
2. (Australia) Maddison Inglis (semifinals)
3. (Australia) Lizette Cabrera (final)
4. (Australia) Kaylah McPhee (first round)
5. (United States) Asia Muhammad (quarterfinals)
6. (Australia) Olivia Rogowska (first round, retired)
7. (Japan) Ayano Shimizu (second round)
8. (United Kingdom) Naiktha Bains (quarterfinals)

== Draw ==
=== Key ===
- Q = Qualifier
- WC = Wild card
- LL = Lucky loser
- Alt = Alternate
- SE = Special exempt
- PR = Protected ranking
- ITF = ITF entry
- JE = Junior exempt
- w/o = Walkover
- r = Retired
- d = Defaulted
- SR = Special ranking

=== Finals ===
Semifinals
(Japan) Chihiro Muramatsu	4	3
WC	(Australia) Storm Sanders	6	6
3	(Australia) Lizette Cabrera	2	6	6
2	(Australia) Maddison Inglis	6	4	4

Final
WC	(Australia) Storm Sanders	6	6
3	(Australia) Lizette Cabrera	3	4

=== Top half ===
First round
1	(Australia) P Hon	6	6
(Slovakia) Z Zlochová	0	2
(Japan) C Muramatsu	6	7^{7}
(Japan) K Okamura	2	6^{1}
(Japan) R Ozaki	6	3	6
Q	(Australia) A Smith	2	6	3
Q	(United States) J Elie	6	3
6	(Australia) O Rogowska	3	0^{r}
4	(Australia) K McPhee	7^{7}	5	3
WC	(Australia) S Sanders	6^{0}	7	6
Q	(Australia) A Marshall	4	5
Q	(Australia) A Bozovic	6	7
Q	(Australia) A Parnaby	4	4
(Japan) H Arakawa	6	6
(Japan) M Osaka	1	2
8	(United Kingdom) N Bains	6	6

Second round
1	(Australia) P Hon	5	2
(Japan) C Muramatsu	7	6
(Japan) R Ozaki	2	2
Q	(United States) J Elie	6	6
WC	(Australia) S Sanders	7^{7}	6
Q	(Australia) A Bozovic	6^{5}	4
(Japan) H Arakawa	3	0
8	(United Kingdom) N Bains	6	6

Quarterfinals
(Japan) C Muramatsu	6	6
Q	(United States) J Elie	3	2
WC	(Australia) S Sanders	6	7
8	(United Kingdom) N Bains	3	5

Semifinals
(Japan) C Muramatsu	4	3
WC	(Australia) S Sanders	6	6

=== Bottom half ===
First round
5	(United States) A Muhammad	6	6
WC	(Australia) I Bozicevic	3	3
Q	(Australia) A Bai	6	7^{7}
Q	(Japan) M Ayukawa	1	6^{1}
WC	(Australia) A Poulos	1	4
(Japan) H Kuwata	6	6
(Japan) M Imanishi	4	4
3	(Australia) L Cabrera	6	6
7	(Japan) A Shimizu	6	6
WC	(Australia) T Lawless	1	4
(Australia) B Woolcock	6	6
Q	(Australia) G Da Silva-Fick	4	4
(Japan) E Hayashi	6	1	1
(Australia) A Myers	3	6	6
(Slovakia) T Mihalíková	2	2
2	(Australia) M Inglis	6	6

Second round
5	(United States) A Muhammad	6	6
Q	(Australia) A Bai	2	1
(Japan) H Kuwata	6	3	4
3	(Australia) L Cabrera	3	6	6
7	(Japan) A Shimizu	0	0
(Australia) B Woolcock	6	6
(Australia) A Myers	5	0^{r}
2	(Australia) M Inglis	7	2

Quarterfinals
5	(United States) A Muhammad	6^{4}	0
3	(Australia) L Cabrera	7^{7}	6
(Australia) B Woolcock	7^{7}	3	3
2	(Australia) M Inglis	6^{5}	6	6

Semifinals
3	(Australia) L Cabrera	2	6	6
2	(Australia) M Inglis	6	4	4
