= 2020 Australian Open – Main draw wildcard entries =

- Date: November 2019 – January 2020
- Edition: 108th
- Category: Grand Slam (ITF)
- Location: (various) United States; Zhuhai, China; Melbourne, Australia
- Australian Open – Main draw wildcard entries

The 2020 Australian Open wildcard playoffs and entries are a group of events and internal selections to choose the eight men and eight women singles wildcard entries for the 2020 Australian Open, as well as seven male and seven female doubles teams plus eight mixed-doubles teams.

== Wildcard entries ==
=== Men's singles ===
Country	Name	Method of Qualification
USA	Michael Mmoh (Note: Marcos Giron was the original winner for the USTA Wildcard Challenge alongside CoCo Vandeweghe. However, when some original players in the entry list field withdrew from the tournament, Giron was moved up directly entering to the main draw as an alternate. His runner-up, Michael Mmoh replaced him.)	American Wildcard Challenge
JPN	Tatsuma Ito	Asia-Pacific Wildcard Playoff
FRA	Hugo Gaston	French internal selection
AUS	John-Patrick Smith	Australian Wildcard Playoff
AUS	Christopher O'Connell	Australian internal selection
AUS	Marc Polmans	Australian internal selection
AUS	Alex Bolt	Australian internal selection
AUS	Andrew Harris	Australian internal selection

=== Women's singles ===
Country	Name	Method of Qualification
USA	CoCo Vandeweghe	American Wildcard Challenge
KOR	Han Na-lae	Asia-Pacific Wildcard Playoff
FRA	Pauline Parmentier	French internal selection
AUS	Arina Rodionova	Australian Wildcard Playoff
AUS	Astra Sharma	Australian internal selection
AUS	Lizette Cabrera	Australian internal selection
AUS	Priscilla Hon	Australian internal selection
RUS	Maria Sharapova	Australian internal selection

=== Men's doubles ===
Country	Name	Method of Qualification
KOR; KOR	Nam Ji-sung; Song Min-kyu	Asia-Pacific Wildcard Playoff
AUS; AUS	Alex Bolt; Matthew Ebden	Australian internal selection
AUS; AUS	James Duckworth; Marc Polmans	Australian internal selection
AUS; AUS	Blake Ellis; Alexei Popyrin	Australian internal selection
AUS; AUS	Andrew Harris; Christopher O'Connell	Australian internal selection
AUS; AUS	Lleyton Hewitt; Jordan Thompson	Australian internal selection
AUS; AUS	Max Purcell; Luke Saville	Australian internal selection

=== Women's doubles ===
Country	Name	Method of Qualification
TPE; TPE	Lee Ya-hsuan; Wu Fang-hsien	Asia-Pacific Wildcard Playoff
AUS; AUS	Alexandra Bozovic; Amber Marshall	Australian Wildcard Playoff
AUS; AUS	Destanee Aiava; Lizette Cabrera	Australian internal selection
AUS; AUS	Jaimee Fourlis; Arina Rodionova	Australian internal selection
AUS; AUS	Priscilla Hon; Storm Sanders	Australian internal selection
AUS; AUS	Maddison Inglis; Kaylah McPhee	Australian internal selection
AUS; AUS	Jessica Moore; Astra Sharma	Australian internal selection

=== Mixed doubles ===
Country	Name	Method of Qualification
AUS; ESP	Monique Adamczak; David Vega Hernández	Australian internal selection
AUS; AUS	Jessica Moore; Matthew Ebden	Australian internal selection
LAT; IND	Jeļena Ostapenko; Leander Paes	Australian internal selection
AUS; AUS	Ellen Perez; Luke Saville	Australian internal selection
AUS; AUS	Arina Rodionova; Andrew Harris	Australian internal selection
AUS; AUS	Storm Sanders; Marc Polmans	Australian internal selection
AUS; AUS	Astra Sharma; John-Patrick Smith	Australian internal selection
AUS; AUS	Belinda Woolcock; Blake Mott	Australian internal selection

== American Wildcard Challenge ==
The USTA awarded a wildcard to the man and woman that earned the most ranking points across a group of three ATP/Challenger hardcourt events in the October and November 2019. For the men, the events included ATP Paris, Shenzhen, Charlottesville, Playford, Bratislava, Knoxville, Kobe, Houston, Champaign, Helsinki, Ortisei and Pune events. For the women, the events included Macon, Poitiers, Saguenay, Tyler, Toronto, Liuzhou, Nantes, Las Vegas, Shenzhen, Houston, Taipei and Tokyo events. For men, only the best two results from the three weeks of events were taken into account. While for women only the best three results from the four weeks of events were taken into account. Any player who otherwise qualified for the main draw of was excluded from wildcard considerations (as happened, in the case of Marcos Giron).

=== Men's standings ===
Place	Player	ATP Paris Shenzhen Charlottesville Playford	Bratislava Knoxville Kobe	Houston Champaign Helsinki Ortisei Pune	Best Two Results
~~1~~	~~Marcos Giron~~	~~15~~	—	~~125~~	~~140~~
2	Michael Mmoh	0	80	25	105
3	J. J. Wolf	~~3~~	7	80	87
4	Mitchell Krueger	7	—	45	52
5	Sebastian Korda	3	~~3~~	48	51

=== Women's standings ===
Place	Player	Macon Poitiers Saguenay	Tyler Toronto Liuzhou Nantes	Las Vegas Shenzhen	Houston Taipei Tokyo	Best Three Results
1	CoCo Vandeweghe	21	21	—	95	137
2	Katerina Stewart	115	—	1	—	116
3	Francesca Di Lorenzo	8	80	—	1	89
4	Alexa Glatch	—	70	15	1	86
5	Danielle Lao	42	42	—	1	85

== Asia-Pacific Wildcard Playoff ==
The Asia-Pacific Australian Open Wildcard Play-off featured 16-players in the men's and women's singles draws and took place from 4 to 8 December 2019 at Hengqin International Tennis Centre in Zhuhai, China.

=== Men's singles ===
==== Seeds ====
1. (Chinese Taipei) Jason Jung (final)
2. (Japan) Tatsuma Ito (winner)
3. (India) Ramkumar Ramanathan (first round)
4. (Uzbekistan) Denis Istomin (first round)
5. (South Korea) Lee Duck-hee (semifinals)
6. (South Korea) Nam Ji-sung (quarterfinals)
7. (India) Sasikumar Mukund (quarterfinals)
8. (Chinese Taipei) Yang Tsung-hua (first round)

==== Draw ====
First round
1	(Chinese Taipei) J Jung	6	6
WC	(China) Cui Jie	3	4
8	(Chinese Taipei) T-h Yang	3	3
Q	(Japan) Yuki Mochizuki	6	6
3	(India) R Ramanathan	3	0
(China) Ze Zhang	6	6
5	(South Korea) D-h Lee	6	6
Q	(Japan) S Shimabukuro	2	1
Q	(India) Sidharth Rawat	3	2
7	(India) S Mukund	6	6
(South Korea) Y-s Chung	7	6
4	(Uzbekistan) D Istomin	5	3
WC	(China) Bu Yunchaokete	4	0
6	(South Korea) J-s Nam	6	6
Q	(Japan) Jumpei Yamasaki	2	2
2	(Japan) T Ito	6	6

Quarterfinals
1	(Chinese Taipei) J Jung	6	6
Q	(Japan) Y Mochizuki	1	4
(China) Ze Zhang	5	3
5	(South Korea) D-h Lee	7	6
7	(India) S Mukund	4	3
(South Korea) Y-s Chung	6	6
6	(South Korea) J-s Nam	6	1	1
2	(Japan) T Ito	3	6	6

Semifinals
1	(Chinese Taipei) J Jung	6	6
5	(South Korea) D-h Lee	2	1
(South Korea) Y-s Chung	6	4	4
2	(Japan) T Ito	1	6	6

Final
1	(Chinese Taipei) J Jung	5	4
2	(Japan) T Ito	7	6

=== Women's singles ===
==== Seeds ====
1. (South Korea) Han Na-lae (winner)
2. (Japan) Ayano Shimizu (final)
3. (Chinese Taipei) Lee Ya-hsuan (first round)
4. (South Korea) Jang Su-jeong (quarterfinals)
5. (Japan) Junri Namigata (quarterfinals)
6. (China) Sun Ziyue (first round)
7. (Japan) Eri Hozumi (quarterfinals)
8. (South Korea) Kim Da-bin (first round)

==== Draw ====
First round
1	(South Korea) N-l Han	6	6
(Japan) E Hayashi	3	2
7	(Japan) E Hozumi	6	6
WC	(China) X Sun	3	2
4	(South Korea) S-j Jang	6	6
Q	(China) X Jiang	3	3
6	(China) Z Sun	6	4	0
Q	(Chinese Taipei) K-c Chang	4	6	6
WC	(China) Q Tang	0	7^{7}	7
8	(South Korea) D-b Kim	6	6^{4}	5
Q	(South Korea) S-h Park	6	6
3	(Chinese Taipei) Y-h Lee	4	1
Q	(China) Q Ye	2^{r}
5	(Japan) J Namigata	3
WC	(Papua New Guinea) A Tere-Apisah	1	6	2
2	(Japan) A Shimizu	6	1	6

Quarterfinals
1	(South Korea) N-l Han	6	6
7	(Japan) E Hozumi	1	1
4	(South Korea) S-j Jang	1	5
Q	(Chinese Taipei) K-c Chang	6	7
WC	(China) Q Tang	6	3	1
Q	(South Korea) S-h Park	4	6	6
5	(Japan) J Namigata	4	1
2	(Japan) A Shimizu	6	6

Semifinals
1	(South Korea) N-l Han	6	6
Q	(Chinese Taipei) K-c Chang	0	4
Q	(South Korea) S-h Park	4	2
2	(Japan) A Shimizu	6	6

Final
1	(South Korea) N-l Han	6	6
2	(Japan) A Shimizu	2	2

=== Men's doubles ===
==== Seeds ====
1. (China) Gong Maoxin / (China) Zhang Ze (final)
2. (South Korea) Nam Ji-sung / (South Korea) Song Min-kyu (winners)
3. (India) Arjun Kadhe / (India) Ramkumar Ramanathan (quarterfinals)
4. (New Zealand) Rhett Purcell / (Japan) Jumpei Yamasaki (semifinals)

==== Draw ====
First round
(Japan) Yuki Mochizuki (Japan) S Shimabukuro	6	6
(Chinese Taipei) H-y Peng (Chinese Taipei) T-h Yang	3	4

Quarterfinals
1	(China) M Gong (China) Ze Zhang	6	6
(China) Cui Jie (China) Bu Yunchaokete	2	0
3	(India) A Kadhe (India) R Ramanathan	3	6	[11]
(Japan) Y Mochizuki (Japan) S Shimabukuro	6	3	[13]
(China) Zhao Zhao (China) Zheng Baoluo	5	6	[3]
4	(New Zealand) R Purcell (Japan) Jumpei Yamasaki	7	4	[10]
(China) Li Zekai (China) Lu Pengyu	2	4
2	(South Korea) J-s Nam (South Korea) M-k Song	6	6

Semifinals
1	(China) M Gong (China) Ze Zhang	7^{7}	6
(Japan) Y Mochizuki (Japan) S Shimabukuro	6^{3}	3
4	(New Zealand) R Purcell (Japan) J Yamasaki	5	3
2	(South Korea) J-s Nam (South Korea) M-k Song	7	6

Final
1	(China) M Gong (China) Ze Zhang	6	2	[6]
2	(South Korea) J-s Nam (South Korea) M-k Song	4	6	[10]

=== Women's doubles ===
==== Seeds ====
1. (China) Jiang Xinyu / (China) Tang Qianhui (semifinals)
2. (Japan) Eri Hozumi / (Japan) Junri Namigata (quarterfinals)
3. (South Korea) Choi Ji-hee / (South Korea) Han Na-lae (semifinals)
4. (Chinese Taipei) Chen Pei-hsuan / (Chinese Taipei) Hsieh Yu-chieh (quarterfinals)

==== Draw ====
First round
(South Korea) D-b Kim (China) Q Ye	6	6
(Japan) E Hayashi (Papua New Guinea) A Tere-Apisah	2	2
(Chinese Taipei) Y-h Lee (Chinese Taipei) F-h Wu	6	2	[10]
(China) X Sun (China) Z Sun	2	6	[5]

Quarterfinals
1	(China) X Jiang (China) Q Tang	w/o
(South Korea) D-b Kim (China) Q Ye
4	(Chinese Taipei) P-h Chen (Chinese Taipei) Y-c Hsieh	6	2^{r}
(South Korea) S-j Jang (South Korea) N-r Kim	3	2
(Chinese Taipei) K-c Chang (Chinese Taipei) C-w Hsu	5	3
3	(South Korea) J-h Choi (South Korea) N-l Han	7	6
(Chinese Taipei) Y-h Lee (Chinese Taipei) F-h Wu	6	6
2	(Japan) E Hozumi (Japan) J Namigata	4	4

Semifinals
1	(China) X Jiang (China) Q Tang	6	3	[7]
(South Korea) S-j Jang (South Korea) N-r Kim	4	6	[10]
3	(South Korea) J-h Choi (South Korea) N-l Han	1	2
(Chinese Taipei) Y-h Lee (Chinese Taipei) F-h Wu	6	6

Final
(South Korea) S-j Jang (South Korea) N-r Kim	2	6	[7]
(Chinese Taipei) Y-h Lee (Chinese Taipei) F-h Wu	6	3	[10]

== Australian Wildcard Playoff ==
The December Showdown is held annually for two weeks in December. The Showdown includes age championships for 12/u, 14/u, 16/u and 18/u age categories. It also hosts the 2020 Australian Wildcard Playoff which will be held from 9–15 December 2019 at Melbourne Park, offering a main draw singles wildcard for men and women and a main draw women's doubles wildcard.

=== Men's singles ===
==== Seeds ====
1. (Australia) Alex Bolt (semifinals)
2. (Australia) Andrew Harris (first round)
3. (Australia) Max Purcell (final)
4. (Australia) Aleksandar Vukic (quarterfinals)
5. (Australia) Harry Bourchier (quarterfinals)
6. (Australia) John-Patrick Smith (winner)
7. (Australia) Luke Saville (quarterfinals)
8. (Australia) Maverick Banes (semifinals)

==== Draw ====
First round
1	(Australia) A Bolt	6^{3}	6	6^{2}	3
(Australia) B Mott	7^{7}	4	7^{7}	3^{r}
(Australia) T Fancutt	3	3	7^{7}	6	3
7	(Australia) L Saville	6	6	6^{5}	4	6
3	(Australia) M Purcell	6	6	6
WC	(Australia) D Sweeny	0	0	4
WC	(Australia) C Puttergill	3	3	3
5	(Australia) H Bourchier	6	6	6
6	(Australia) J-P Smith	6	7^{7}	6
(Australia) B Walkin	3	6^{1}	3
(Australia) Jacob Grills	4	4	3
4	(Australia) A Vukic	6	6	6
8	(Australia) M Banes	7^{7}	6	6
WC	(Australia) R Hijikata	6^{2}	4	1
WC	(Australia) T Schoolkate	4	7^{7}	6	3	6
2	(Australia) A Harris	6	6^{2}	2	6	2

Quarterfinals
1	(Australia) A Bolt	6	2	6	6
7	(Australia) L Saville	4	6	3	4
3	(Australia) M Purcell	7^{7}	6	6
5	(Australia) H Bourchier	6^{4}	3	1
6	(Australia) J-P Smith	6	6^{15}	6	6
4	(Australia) A Vukic	3	7^{17}	3	1
8	(Australia) M Banes	4	6	4	7	7
WC	(Australia) T Schoolkate	6	0	6	5	5

Semifinals
1	(Australia) A Bolt	6^{3}	2	3
3	(Australia) M Purcell	7^{7}	6	6
6	(Australia) J-P Smith	6	6	6
8	(Australia) M Banes	2	1	3

Final
3	(Australia) M Purcell	3	4	1
6	(Australia) J-P Smith	6	6	6

=== Women's singles ===
==== Seeds ====
1. (Australia) Maddison Inglis (quarterfinals)
2. (Australia) Lizette Cabrera (withdrew)
3. (Australia) Destanee Aiava (quarterfinals)
4. (Australia) Arina Rodionova (winner)
5. (Australia) Ellen Perez (first round)
6. (Australia) Jaimee Fourlis (first round)
7. (Australia) Belinda Woolcock (semifinals)
8. (Australia) Abbie Myers (semifinals)

==== Draw ====
First round
1	(Australia) M Inglis	2	6	6
WC	(Australia) C Kempenaers-Pocz	6	3	4
(Australia) A Bai	3	4
7	(Australia) B Woolcock	6	6
4	(Australia) Ar Rodionova	6	6
WC	(Australia) S Tomic	1	2
(Australia) O Tjandramulia	6	4	6
6	(Australia) J Fourlis	1	6	4
5	(Australia) E Perez	3	1
(Australia) S Sanders	6	6
WC	(Australia) T Gibson	1	6^{2}
3	(Australia) D Aiava	6	7^{7}
8	(Australia) A Myers	5	6	6
(Australia) A Bozovic	7	3	4
WC	(Australia) G Da Silva-Fick	6	4	7
Alt	(Australia) A Parnaby	2	6	5

Quarterfinals
1	(Australia) M Inglis	3	2
7	(Australia) B Woolcock	6	6
4	(Australia) Ar Rodionova	7	6
(Australia) O Tjandramulia	5	0
(Australia) S Sanders	6	6
3	(Australia) D Aiava	2	3
8	(Australia) A Myers	6	4	6
WC	(Australia) G Da Silva-Fick	2	6	3

Semifinals
7	(Australia) B Woolcock	2	6	2
4	(Australia) Ar Rodionova	6	4	6
(Australia) S Sanders	7^{7}	6
8	(Australia) A Myers	6^{1}	2

Final
4	(Australia) Ar Rodionova	6	7
(Australia) S Sanders	4	5

=== Women's doubles ===
==== Seeds ====
1. (Australia) Jaimee Fourlis / (Australia) Arina Rodionova (first round)
2. (Australia) Destanee Aiava / (Australia) Lizette Cabrera (semifinals, withdrew)
3. (Australia) Abbie Myers / (Australia) Belinda Woolcock (first round)
4. (Australia) Gabriella Da Silva-Fick / (Australia) Olivia Tjandramulia (final)

==== Draw ====
First round
1	(Australia) J Fourlis (Australia) Ar Rodionova	6^{6}	0
WC	(Australia) T Gibson (Australia) A Poulos	7^{8}	6
3	(Australia) A Myers (Australia) B Woolcock	3	4
(Australia) A Bozovic (Australia) A Marshall	6	6
(Australia) A Parnaby (Australia) S Tomic	6	1	6^{8}
4	(Australia) G Da Silva-Fick (Australia) O Tjandramulia	4	6	7^{10}
(Australia) Laura Ashley (Australia) I Bozicevic	4	2
2	(Australia) D Aiava (Australia) L Cabrera	6	6

Semifinals
WC	(Australia) T Gibson (Australia) A Poulos	7^{7}	4	2
(Australia) A Bozovic (Australia) A Marshall	6^{4}	6	6
4	(Australia) G Da Silva-Fick (Australia) O Tjandramulia	w/o
2	(Australia) D Aiava (Australia) L Cabrera

Final
(Australia) A Bozovic (Australia) A Marshall	6	6
4	(Australia) G Da Silva-Fick (Australia) O Tjandramulia	2	3
