= 2022 City of Playford Tennis International =

Tennis tournament

- Date: 24–30 October 2022
- Edition: 4th
- Category: ATP Challenger Tour; ITF Women's World Tennis Tour
- Prize money: $53,120 (men) $60,000 (women)
- Surface: Hard / Outdoor
- Location: City of Playford, Australia

Champions

Men's singles
- (Australia) Rinky Hijikata

Women's singles
- (Australia) Kimberly Birrell

Men's doubles
- (Australia) Jeremy Beale / (Australia) Calum Puttergill

Women's doubles
- (Australia) Alexandra Bozovic / (Australia) Talia Gibson
← 2019 ·	City of Playford Tennis International	· 2023 →

The 2022 City of Playford Tennis International was a professional tennis tournament played on outdoor hard courts. It was the fourth edition of the tournament which was part of the 2022 ATP Challenger Tour and the 2022 ITF Women's World Tennis Tour. It took place in the City of Playford, Australia between 24 and 30 October 2022.

== Champions ==
=== Men's singles ===
- (Australia) Rinky Hijikata def. (Japan) Rio Noguchi 6–1, 6–1.

=== Women's singles ===
- (Australia) Kimberly Birrell def. (Australia) Maddison Inglis, 3–6, 7–5, 6–4

=== Men's doubles ===
- (Australia) Jeremy Beale / (Australia) Calum Puttergill def. (Japan) Rio Noguchi / (Japan) Yusuke Takahashi 7–6^{(7–2)}, 6–4.

=== Women's doubles ===
- (Australia) Alexandra Bozovic / (Australia) Talia Gibson def. (South Korea) Han Na-lae / (Indonesia) Priska Madelyn Nugroho, 7–5, 6–4

== Men's singles main draw entrants ==
=== Seeds ===
Country	Player	Rank^{1}	Seed
AUS	Jordan Thompson	83	1
AUS	James Duckworth	108	2
AUS	Aleksandar Vukic	150	3
AUS	Li Tu	190	4
AUS	Rinky Hijikata	191	5
JPN	Rio Noguchi	246	6
AUS	Dane Sweeny	255	7
AUS	Omar Jasika	279	8

- ^{1} Rankings are as of 17 October 2022.

=== Other entrants ===
The following players received wildcards into the singles main draw:

- (Australia) Alex Bolt
- (Australia) Blake Ellis
- (Australia) Edward Winter

The following player received entry into the singles main draw using a protected ranking:

- (Australia) Jeremy Beale

The following players received entry from the qualifying draw:

- (Australia) Jeremy Jin
- (Australia) Blake Mott
- (Australia) Calum Puttergill
- (New Zealand) Ajeet Rai
- (Australia) Luke Saville
- (Japan) Yusuke Takahashi

== Women's singles main draw entrants ==
=== Seeds ===
Country	Player	Rank^{1}	Seed
AUS	Priscilla Hon	158	1
AUS	Jaimee Fourlis	176	2
AUS	Maddison Inglis	191	3
KOR	Han Na-lae	200	4
AUS	Olivia Gadecki	234	5
AUS	Kimberly Birrell	243	6
AUS	Lizette Cabrera	278	7
JPN	Mai Hontama	286	8

- ^{1} Rankings are as of 17 October 2022.

=== Other entrants ===
The following players received entry from the qualifying draw:

- (Japan) Natsuho Arakawa
- (Australia) Roopa Bains
- (New Zealand) Monique Barry
- (Australia) Petra Hule
- (Australia) Lisa Mays
- (Australia) Kaylah McPhee
- (Australia) Sara Nayar
- (Germany) Sarah-Rebecca Sekulic
