= 2022 City of Playford Tennis International – Women's singles =

Women's singles
- 2022 City of Playford Tennis International

Final
- Champion: (Australia) Kimberly Birrell
- Runner-up: (Australia) Maddison Inglis
- Score: 3–6, 7–5, 6–4

Events
Singles	men	women
Doubles	men	women
← 2019 ·	City of Playford Tennis International	· 2023 →

Storm Sanders was the defending champion but chose to compete at the 2022 Christus Health Pro Challenge instead.

Kimberly Birrell won the title, defeating Maddison Inglis in the final, 3–6, 7–5, 6–4.

== Seeds ==
1. (Australia) Priscilla Hon (quarterfinals)
2. (Australia) Jaimee Fourlis (quarterfinals)
3. (Australia) Maddison Inglis (final)
4. (South Korea) Han Na-lae (semifinals)
5. (Australia) Olivia Gadecki (quarterfinals)
6. (Australia) Kimberly Birrell (champion)
7. (Australia) Lizette Cabrera (semifinals)
8. (Japan) Mai Hontama (quarterfinals)

== Draw ==
=== Key ===
- Q = Qualifier
- WC = Wild card
- LL = Lucky loser
- Alt = Alternate
- SE = Special exempt
- PR = Protected ranking
- ITF = ITF entry
- JE = Junior exempt
- w/o = Walkover
- r = Retired
- d = Defaulted
- SR = Special ranking

=== Finals ===
Semifinals
7	(Australia) Lizette Cabrera	1	6	1
3	(Australia) Maddison Inglis	6	4	6
4	(South Korea) Han Na-lae	4	1
6	(Australia) Kimberly Birrell	6	6

Final
3	(Australia) Maddison Inglis	6	5	4
6	(Australia) Kimberly Birrell	3	7	6

=== Top half ===
First round
1	(Australia) P Hon	6	7^{7}
(Japan) J Namigata	1	6^{2}
Q	(Japan) N Arakawa	6	6
(Slovakia) Z Zlochová	2	2
Q	(Australia) S Nayar	2	2
(United States) M Jones	6	6
(United States) J Failla	6	3	4
7	(Australia) L Cabrera	4	6	6
3	(Australia) M Inglis	6	3	6
Q	(Australia) L Mays	0	6	3
(Japan) K Okamura	3	6	2
(United Kingdom) N Bains	6	3	6
(Germany) J Jebawy	1	4
Q	(Australia) P Hule	6	6
(Australia) TN Smith	3	1
5	(Australia) O Gadecki	6	6

Second round
1	(Australia) P Hon	6	6
Q	(Japan) N Arakawa	3	3
(United States) M Jones	3	6	2
7	(Australia) L Cabrera	6	4	6
3	(Australia) M Inglis	6	6
(United Kingdom) N Bains	4	4
Q	(Australia) P Hule	6^{4}	2
5	(Australia) O Gadecki	7^{7}	6

Quarterfinals
1	(Australia) P Hon	0	3
7	(Australia) L Cabrera	6	6
3	(Australia) M Inglis	3	7	6
5	(Australia) O Gadecki	6	5	1

Semifinals
7	(Australia) L Cabrera	1	6	1
3	(Australia) M Inglis	6	4	6

=== Bottom half ===
First round
8	(Japan) M Hontama	6	6
(Australia) A Bozovic	4	4
Q	(Germany) S-R Sekulic	5	6	1
(Japan) C Muramatsu	7	2	6
(Japan) N Hanatani	6	6
(Australia) T Preston	3	1
(Australia) T Gibson	1	6	1
4	(South Korea) N-l Han	6	2	6
6	(Australia) K Birrell	4
(Japan) H Arakawa	1^{r}
Q	(Australia) K McPhee	6	6
Q	(New Zealand) M Barry	4	1
(Indonesia) PM Nugroho	6	6
Q	(Australia) R Bains	3	0
(Australia) A Parnaby	2	3
2	(Australia) J Fourlis	6	6

Second round
8	(Japan) M Hontama	6	6
(Japan) C Muramatsu	4	3
(Japan) N Hanatani	3	2
4	(South Korea) N-l Han	6	6
6	(Australia) K Birrell	6	6
Q	(Australia) K McPhee	2	4
(Indonesia) PM Nugroho	6^{4}	1
2	(Australia) J Fourlis	7^{7}	6

Quarterfinals
8	(Japan) M Hontama	3	3
4	(South Korea) N-l Han	6	6
6	(Australia) K Birrell	6	6
2	(Australia) J Fourlis	0	1

Semifinals
4	(South Korea) N-l Han	4	1
6	(Australia) K Birrell	6	6
