= 2019 City of Playford Tennis International – Men's singles =

Men's singles
- 2019 City of Playford Tennis International

Final
- Champion: (Brazil) Rogério Dutra Silva
- Runner-up: (Germany) Mats Moraing
- Score: 6–3, 6–2

Events
Singles	men	women
Doubles	men	women
← 2018 ·	City of Playford Tennis International	· 2019 →

Jason Kubler was the defending champion but chose not to defend his title.

Rogério Dutra Silva won the title after defeating Mats Moraing 6–3, 6–2 in the final.

== Seeds ==
All seeds receive a bye into the second round.

1. (Italy) Lorenzo Sonego (quarterfinals)
2. (Norway) Casper Ruud (quarterfinals)
3. (South Africa) Lloyd Harris (quarterfinals, retired)
4. (Spain) Adrián Menéndez Maceiras (second round)
5. (Italy) Stefano Travaglia (second round)
6. (France) Corentin Moutet (second round)
7. (Japan) Tatsuma Ito (second round)
8. (Germany) Mats Moraing (final)
9. (France) Constant Lestienne (semifinals)
10. (Brazil) Rogério Dutra Silva (champion)
11. (Germany) Dominik Köpfer (third round)
12. (Kazakhstan) Alexander Bublik (second round)
13. (Germany) Oscar Otte (third round)
14. (Italy) Luca Vanni (third round)
15. (Switzerland) Henri Laaksonen (third round)
16. (Serbia) Peđa Krstin (second round)

== Draw ==
=== Key ===
- Q = Qualifier
- WC = Wild card
- LL = Lucky loser
- Alt = Alternate
- SE = Special exempt
- PR = Protected ranking
- ITF = ITF entry
- JE = Junior exempt
- w/o = Walkover
- r = Retired
- d = Defaulted
- SR = Special ranking

=== Finals ===
Quarterfinals
1	(Italy) Lorenzo Sonego	6	6^{5}	4
8	(Germany) Mats Moraing	1	7^{7}	6
3	(South Africa) Lloyd Harris	6^{5}	0^{r}
9	(France) Constant Lestienne	7^{7}	3
(United States) Tommy Paul	6^{8}	0^{r}
ITF	(China) Li Zhe	7^{10}	1
10	(Brazil) Rogério Dutra Silva	6	7
2	(Norway) Casper Ruud	2	5

Semifinals
8	(Germany) Mats Moraing	6	6
9	(France) Constant Lestienne	4	2
ITF	(China) Li Zhe	7^{7}	4	3
10	(Brazil) Rogério Dutra Silva	6^{5}	6	6

Final
8	(Germany) Mats Moraing	3	2
10	(Brazil) Rogério Dutra Silva	6	6

=== Top half ===
==== Section 1 ====
First round
(Czech Republic) Z Kolář	6	6
(Spain) S Gutiérrez Ferrol	2	3
(Germany) R Molleker	4	2
(Serbia) V Troicki	6	6
(Japan) G Soeda	6	3	6
(Italy) F Gaio	3	6	3
(United States) E Escobedo	7^{7}	7^{7}
(Italy) M Donati	6^{5}	6^{3}

Second round
1	(Italy) L Sonego	6	6
(Czech Republic) Z Kolář	3	4
(Serbia) V Troicki	6	1	5
13	(Germany) O Otte	4	6	7
11	(Germany) D Köpfer	6	7
(Japan) G Soeda	4	5
(United States) E Escobedo	1	3
8	(Germany) M Moraing	6	6

Third round
1	(Italy) L Sonego	6	6
13	(Germany) O Otte	3	2
11	(Germany) D Köpfer	1	4
8	(Germany) M Moraing	6	6

Quarterfinals
1	(Italy) L Sonego	6	6^{5}	4
8	(Germany) M Moraing	1	7^{7}	6

==== Section 2 ====
First round
(Egypt) M Safwat	6	1	7^{7}
WC	(Australia) A Santillan	2	6	6^{2}
WC	(Australia) L Saville	0	6	1
(Germany) T Kamke	6	3	6
Q	(Chinese Taipei) C-h Tseng	4	0
WC	(Australia) A Vukic	6	6
ITF	(Spain) E López Pérez	6	6
WC	(Australia) R Hijikata	4	4

Second round
3	(South Africa) L Harris	6	6^{3}	7^{7}
(Egypt) M Safwat	4	7^{7}	6^{5}
(Germany) T Kamke	7	6
16	(Serbia) P Krstin	5	4
9	(France) C Lestienne	6	7
WC	(Australia) A Vukic	3	5
ITF	(Spain) E López Pérez	4	6	7
5	(Italy) S Travaglia	6	3	5

Third round
3	(South Africa) L Harris	6	7^{7}
(Germany) T Kamke	2	6^{1}
9	(France) C Lestienne	6	6
ITF	(Spain) E López Pérez	3	2

Quarterfinals
3	(South Africa) L Harris	6^{5}	0^{r}
9	(France) C Lestienne	7^{7}	3

=== Bottom half ===
==== Section 3 ====
First round
(Japan) H Moriya	6	6
(Japan) Yo Watanuki	3	4
(United States) T Paul	6	6
ITF	(Russia) A Zhurbin	3	2
(Poland) K Majchrzak	7^{7}	6
(United Kingdom) D Evans	6^{1}	4
Q	(Australia) A Harris	4	4
ITF	(China) Z Li	6	6

Second round
6	(France) C Moutet	1	4
(Japan) H Moriya	6	6
(United States) T Paul	1	6	7
12	(Kazakhstan) A Bublik	6	4	5
14	(Italy) L Vanni	7^{9}	4	6
(Poland) K Majchrzak	6^{7}	6	4
ITF	(China) Z Li	6^{4}	6	6
4	(Spain) A Menéndez Maceiras	7^{7}	3	3

Third round
(Japan) H Moriya	0	6	2
(United States) T Paul	6	2	6
14	(Italy) L Vanni	6	5	3
ITF	(China) Z Li	1	7	6

Quarterfinals
(United States) T Paul	6^{8}	0^{r}
ITF	(China) Z Li	7^{10}	1

==== Section 4 ====
First round
(Kazakhstan) A Nedovyesov	7	6
(China) Ze Zhang	5	4
ITF	(France) S Doumbia	1	6	6
WC	(Australia) M Purcell	6	4	4
(Czech Republic) A Pavlásek	6	4	4
(France) C Hemery	4	6	6
(Italy) S Napolitano	3	6	5
(Belgium) A De Greef	6	3	7

Second round
7	(Japan) T Ito	5	4
(Kazakhstan) A Nedovyesov	7	6
ITF	(France) S Doumbia	1	6^{5}
10	(Brazil) R Dutra Silva	6	7^{7}
15	(Switzerland) H Laaksonen	2	6	6
(France) C Hemery	6	4	4
(Belgium) A De Greef	1	3
2	(Norway) C Ruud	6	6

Third round
(Kazakhstan) A Nedovyesov	6	6^{2}	2
10	(Brazil) R Dutra Silva	4	7^{7}	6
15	(Switzerland) H Laaksonen	3	4
2	(Norway) C Ruud	6	6

Quarterfinals
10	(Brazil) R Dutra Silva	6	7
2	(Norway) C Ruud	2	5
