= 2019 City of Playford Tennis International II – Men's doubles =

Men's doubles
- 2019 City of Playford Tennis International II

Final
- Champions: (Finland) Harri Heliövaara (Finland) Patrik Niklas-Salminen
- Runners-up: (Philippines) Ruben Gonzales (United States) Evan King
- Score: 6–4, 6–7^{(4–7)}, [10–7]

Events
Singles	men	women
Doubles	men	women
← 2019 ·	City of Playford Tennis International	· 2022 →

Max Purcell and Luke Saville were the defending champions but chose not to defend their title.

Harri Heliövaara and Patrik Niklas-Salminen won the title after defeating Ruben Gonzales and Evan King 6–4, 6–7^{(4–7)}, [10–7] in the final.

== Seeds ==
1. (Philippines) Ruben Gonzales / (United States) Evan King (final)
2. (Australia) Alex Bolt / (Australia) Matt Reid (first round)
3. (United Kingdom) Brydan Klein / (Australia) Scott Puodziunas (semifinals)
4. (Switzerland) Luca Castelnuovo / (Australia) Thomas Fancutt (quarterfinals)

== Draw ==
=== Key ===
- Q = Qualifier
- WC = Wild card
- LL = Lucky loser
- Alt = Alternate
- SE = Special exempt
- PR = Protected ranking
- ITF = ITF entry
- JE = Junior exempt
- w/o = Walkover
- r = Retired
- d = Defaulted
- SR = Special ranking

First round
1	(Philippines) R Gonzales (United States) E King	7^{11}	7^{7}
(Australia) C Puttergill (Australia) B Walkin	6^{9}	6^{3}
WC	(Australia) T Schoolkate (Australia) D Sweeny	6	6
WC	(Australia) David Barclay (Australia) Cameron Green	4	4
4	(Switzerland) L Castelnuovo (Australia) T Fancutt	6	6
WC	(Australia) Alexander Crnokrak (Australia) M Romios	4	4
(Australia) M Banes (Australia) H Bourchier	7^{7}	7^{8}
(Germany) S Fanselow (Germany) Lucas Gerch	6^{5}	6^{6}
(Chile) MT Barrios Vera (Chile) A Tabilo	7^{7}	6^{2}	[10]
(Australia) B Mousley (Australia) A Santillan	6^{1}	7^{7}	[6]
(Australia) Jacob Grills (Australia) A Vukic
3	(United Kingdom) B Klein (Australia) S Puodziunas	w/o
(Australia) A Taylor (Australia) J Taylor	4	2
(Finland) H Heliövaara (Finland) P Niklas-Salminen	6	6
(Thailand) Sa Ratiwatana (Japan) Yo Watanuki	7	3	[10]
2	(Australia) A Bolt (Australia) M Reid	5	6	[6]

Quarterfinals
1	(Philippines) R Gonzales (United States) E King	7	6
WC	(Australia) T Schoolkate (Australia) D Sweeny	5	3
4	(Switzerland) L Castelnuovo (Australia) T Fancutt	6^{7}	5
(Australia) M Banes (Australia) H Bourchier	7^{9}	7
(Chile) MT Barrios Vera (Chile) A Tabilo	6	6^{7}	[7]
3	(United Kingdom) B Klein (Australia) S Puodziunas	2	7^{9}	[10]
(Finland) H Heliövaara (Finland) P Niklas-Salminen	6	6
(Thailand) Sa Ratiwatana (Japan) Yo Watanuki	3	4

Semifinals
1	(Philippines) R Gonzales (United States) E King	6	6
(Australia) M Banes (Australia) H Bourchier	4	1
3	(United Kingdom) B Klein (Australia) S Puodziunas	5	4
(Finland) H Heliövaara (Finland) P Niklas-Salminen	7	6

Final
1	(Philippines) R Gonzales (United States) E King	4	7^{7}	[7]
(Finland) H Heliövaara (Finland) P Niklas-Salminen	6	6^{4}	[10]
