= 2019 City of Playford Tennis International – Men's doubles =

Men's doubles
- 2019 City of Playford Tennis International

Final
- Champions: (Australia) Max Purcell (Australia) Luke Saville
- Runners-up: (Uruguay) Ariel Behar (Spain) Enrique López Pérez
- Score: 6–4, 7–5

Events
Singles	men	women
Doubles	men	women
← 2018 ·	City of Playford Tennis International	· 2019 →

Mackenzie McDonald and Tommy Paul were the defending champions but chose not to defend their title.

Max Purcell and Luke Saville won the title after defeating Ariel Behar and Enrique López Pérez 6–4, 7–5 in the final.

== Seeds ==
1. (Belgium) Sander Gillé / (Belgium) Joran Vliegen (semifinals)
2. (China) Gong Maoxin / (China) Zhang Ze (quarterfinals)
3. (Australia) Max Purcell / (Australia) Luke Saville (champions)
4. (Uruguay) Ariel Behar / (Spain) Enrique López Pérez (final)

== Draw ==
=== Key ===
- Q = Qualifier
- WC = Wild card
- LL = Lucky loser
- Alt = Alternate
- SE = Special exempt
- PR = Protected ranking
- ITF = ITF entry
- JE = Junior exempt
- w/o = Walkover
- r = Retired
- d = Defaulted
- SR = Special ranking

First round
1	(Belgium) S Gillé (Belgium) J Vliegen	6	6
WC	(Australia) B Mousley (Australia) A Whittington	3	3
(Spain) A Menéndez Maceiras (Kazakhstan) A Nedovyesov	3	4
(Germany) D Köpfer (Norway) C Ruud	6	6
3	(Australia) M Purcell (Australia) L Saville	6	6
ITF	(France) S Doumbia (Russia) A Zhurbin	1	2
WC	(Australia) A Harris (Australia) A Santillan	6	6
(South Africa) L Harris (China) Z Li	3	4
(France) C Moutet (Italy) L Vanni	2	6^{2}
(Kazakhstan) A Bublik (Italy) S Travaglia	6	7^{7}
WC	(Australia) R Hijikata (Australia) A Vukic	2	4
4	(Uruguay) A Behar (Spain) E López Pérez	6	6
(Germany) M Moraing (Germany) O Otte	6	6^{5}	[11]
(Italy) M Donati (Italy) L Sonego	4	7^{7}	[9]
ITF	(Italy) M Bortolotti (Australia) J Taylor	3	1
2	(China) M Gong (China) Ze Zhang	6	6

Quarterfinals
1	(Belgium) S Gillé (Belgium) J Vliegen	w/o
(Germany) D Köpfer (Norway) C Ruud
3	(Australia) M Purcell (Australia) L Saville	5	6	[11]
WC	(Australia) A Harris (Australia) A Santillan	7	4	[9]
(Kazakhstan) A Bublik (Italy) S Travaglia	4	6	[8]
4	(Uruguay) A Behar (Spain) E López Pérez	6	3	[10]
(Germany) M Moraing (Germany) O Otte	6	3	[10]
2	(China) M Gong (China) Ze Zhang	2	6	[6]

Semifinals
1	(Belgium) S Gillé (Belgium) J Vliegen	6	6^{4}	[5]
3	(Australia) M Purcell (Australia) L Saville	3	7^{7}	[10]
4	(Uruguay) A Behar (Spain) E López Pérez	7^{7}	6
(Germany) M Moraing (Germany) O Otte	6^{2}	4

Final
3	(Australia) M Purcell (Australia) L Saville	6	7
4	(Uruguay) A Behar (Spain) E López Pérez	4	5
