= 2018 City of Playford Tennis International =

- Date: 1–7 January
- Edition: 1st
- Category: ATP Challenger Tour; ITF Women's Circuit
- Prize money: $75,000 (ATP) $25,000 (ITF)
- Surface: Hard
- Location: Playford, Australia

Champions

Men's singles
- (Australia) Jason Kubler

Women's singles
- (Australia) Zoe Hives

Men's doubles
- (United States) Mackenzie McDonald / (United States) Tommy Paul

Women's doubles
- (Slovenia) Dalila Jakupović / (Russia) Irina Khromacheva
| City of Playford Tennis International | · 2019 → |

The 2018 City of Playford Tennis International was a professional tennis tournament played on hard courts. It was the first edition of the tournament which was part of the 2018 ATP Challenger Tour and the 2018 ITF Women's Circuit. It took place in Playford, Australia between 1 and 7 January 2018.

== Men's singles main-draw entrants ==
=== Seeds ===
| Country | Player | Rank^{1} | Seed |
|---|---|---|---|
| RUS | Daniil Medvedev | 65 | 1 |
| USA | Bjorn Fratangelo | 110 | 2 |
| SUI | Henri Laaksonen | 121 | 3 |
| UKR | Sergiy Stakhovsky | 122 | 4 |
| GER | Oscar Otte | 131 | 5 |
| SVK | Norbert Gombos | 132 | 6 |
| LTU | Ričardas Berankis | 136 | 7 |
| BLR | Uladzimir Ignatik | 145 | 8 |

- ^{1} Rankings are as of 25 December 2017.

=== Other entrants ===
The following players received wildcards into the singles main draw:

- (Australia) Omar Jasika
- (Australia) Marc Polmans
- (Australia) Alexei Popyrin
- (Australia) Max Purcell

The following players received entry from the qualifying draw:

- (Australia) Maverick Banes
- (France) Hugo Grenier
- (Australia) Jason Kubler
- (Australia) Marinko Matosevic

== Women's singles main-draw entrants ==
=== Seeds ===
| Country | Player | Rank^{1} | Seed |
|---|---|---|---|
| CHN | Zhu Lin | 114 | 1 |
| SUI | Jil Teichmann | 141 | 2 |
| RUS | Anna Kalinskaya | 159 | 3 |
| TUR | Başak Eraydın | 174 | 4 |
| SLO | Dalila Jakupović | 175 | 5 |
| CZE | Marie Bouzková | 176 | 6 |
| RUS | Irina Khromacheva | 187 | 7 |
| CAN | Bianca Andreescu | 189 | 8 |

- ^{1} Rankings are as of 25 December 2017.

=== Other entrants ===
The following players received wildcards into the singles main draw:

- (Australia) Michaela Haet
- (Australia) Kaylah McPhee
- (Australia) Ivana Popovic
- (Australia) Alexandra Walters

The following players received entry from the qualifying draw:

- (Australia) Alison Bai
- (Australia) Alexandra Bozovic
- (Japan) Misa Eguchi
- (United States) Jennifer Elie
- (Germany) Anna-Lena Friedsam
- (United States) Allie Kiick
- (Ukraine) Marta Kostyuk
- (Australia) Belinda Woolcock

== Champions ==
=== Men's singles ===
- (Australia) Jason Kubler def. (Canada) Brayden Schnur, 6–4, 6–2

=== Women's singles ===
- (Australia) Zoe Hives def. (Australia) Alexandra Bozovic, 6–4, 5–7, 7–6^{(7–4)}

=== Men's doubles ===
- (United States) Mackenzie McDonald / (United States) Tommy Paul def. (Australia) Maverick Banes / (Australia) Jason Kubler, 7–6^{(7–4)}, 6–4.

=== Women's doubles ===
- (Slovenia) Dalila Jakupović / (Russia) Irina Khromacheva def. (Japan) Junri Namigata / (Japan) Erika Sema, 2–6, 7–5, [10–5]
