= 2022 City of Playford Tennis International – Women's doubles =

Women's doubles
- 2022 City of Playford Tennis International

Final
- Champions: (Australia) Alexandra Bozovic (Australia) Talia Gibson
- Runners-up: (South Korea) Han Na-lae (Indonesia) Priska Madelyn Nugroho
- Score: 7–5, 6–4

Events
| Singles | men | women |
| Doubles | men | women |
| ← 2019 · | City of Playford Tennis International | · 2023 → |

Alexandra Bozovic and Talia Gibson won the title after defeating Han Na-lae and Priska Madelyn Nugroho 7–5, 6–4 in the final.

Asia Muhammad and Storm Sanders were the defending champions but both players chose not to participate.

== Seeds ==
1. (South Korea) Han Na-lae / (Indonesia) Priska Madelyn Nugroho (final)
2. (Australia) Kimberly Birrell / (Australia) Maddison Inglis (first round)
3. (Japan) Junri Namigata / (Indonesia) Jessy Rompies (quarterfinals)
4. (Japan) Haruna Arakawa / (Japan) Natsuho Arakawa (semifinals)

== Draw ==
=== Key ===
- Q = Qualifier
- WC = Wild card
- LL = Lucky loser
- Alt = Alternate
- SE = Special exempt
- PR = Protected ranking
- ITF = ITF entry
- JE = Junior exempt
- w/o = Walkover
- r = Retired
- d = Defaulted
- SR = Special ranking

=== Draw ===
First round
1 | (South Korea) N-l Han (Indonesia) PM Nugroho | 6 | 7
Alt | (Turkey) M Ercan (Slovakia) Z Zlochová | 3 | 5
(Australia) P Hule (Australia) T Preston | 6 | 3 | [10]
(United States) J Failla (Australia) J Fourlis | 1 | 6 | [8]
4 | (Japan) H Arakawa (Japan) N Arakawa | 6 | 6
(New Zealand) M Barry (Australia) S Nayar | 4 | 4
WC | (Australia) M Tsoukalas (Australia) Y Yan | 3 | 6 | [7]
(Australia) S Leeson (Germany) S-R Sekulic | 6 | 2 | [10]
(Australia) K McPhee (Australia) A Parnaby | 2 | 3
(United States) M Jones (Australia) L Mays | 6 | 6
(Germany) J Jebawy (Australia) TN Smith | 1 | 3
3 | (Japan) J Namigata (Indonesia) J Rompies | 6 | 6
(Australia) R Bains (Australia) L Walker | 1 | 6^{7}
(Japan) N Hanatani (Japan) M Hontama | 6 | 7^{9}
(Australia) A Bozovic (Australia) T Gibson | 2 | 6 | [10]
2 | (Australia) K Birrell (Australia) M Inglis | 6 | 2 | [8]

Quarterfinals
1 | (South Korea) N-l Han (Indonesia) PM Nugroho | 6 | 6
(Australia) P Hule (Australia) T Preston | 4 | 4
4 | (Japan) H Arakawa (Japan) N Arakawa | 7 | 6
(Australia) S Leeson (Germany) S-R Sekulic | 5 | 1
(United States) M Jones (Australia) L Mays | 6 | 6
3 | (Japan) J Namigata (Indonesia) J Rompies | 4 | 1
(Japan) N Hanatani (Japan) M Hontama | 1 | 2
(Australia) A Bozovic (Australia) T Gibson | 6 | 6

Semifinals
1 | (South Korea) N-l Han (Indonesia) PM Nugroho | 6 | 6
4 | (Japan) H Arakawa (Japan) N Arakawa | 1 | 4
(United States) M Jones (Australia) L Mays | 3 | 3
(Australia) A Bozovic (Australia) T Gibson | 6 | 6

Final
1 | (South Korea) N-l Han (Indonesia) PM Nugroho | 5 | 4
(Australia) A Bozovic (Australia) T Gibson | 7 | 6
