= 2019 City of Playford Tennis International =

- Date: 31 December 2018 – 6 January 2019
- Edition: 2nd
- Category: ATP Challenger Tour (Challenger 90); ITF Women's World Tennis Tour (W25)
- Prize money: $81,240 (ATP) $25,000 (ITF)
- Surface: Hard
- Location: Playford, Australia

Champions

Men's singles
- (Brazil) Rogério Dutra Silva

Women's singles
- (Russia) Anna Kalinskaya

Men's doubles
- (Australia) Max Purcell / (Australia) Luke Saville

Women's doubles
- (Italy) Giulia Gatto-Monticone / (Italy) Anastasia Grymalska
← 2018 ·	City of Playford Tennis International	· 2019 →

The 2019 City of Playford Tennis International was a professional tennis tournament played on hard courts. It was the second edition of the tournament which was part of the 2019 ATP Challenger Tour and the 2019 ITF Women's World Tennis Tour. It took place in Playford, Australia between 31 December 2018 and 6 January 2019.

== Men's singles main-draw entrants ==
=== Seeds ===
Country	Player	Rank^{1}	Seed
ITA	Lorenzo Sonego	107	1
NOR	Casper Ruud	112	2
RSA	Lloyd Harris	127	3
ESP	Adrián Menéndez Maceiras	129	4
ITA	Stefano Travaglia	133	5
FRA	Corentin Moutet	144	6
JPN	Tatsuma Ito	148	7
GER	Mats Moraing	150	8
FRA	Constant Lestienne	151	9
BRA	Rogério Dutra Silva	159	10
GER	Dominik Köpfer	161	11
KAZ	Alexander Bublik	162	12
GER	Oscar Otte	167	13
ITA	Luca Vanni	168	14
SUI	Henri Laaksonen	169	15
SRB	Peđa Krstin	171	16

=== Other entrants ===
The following players received wildcards into the singles main draw:

- (Australia) Rinky Hijikata
- (Australia) Max Purcell
- (Australia) Akira Santillan
- (Australia) Luke Saville
- (Australia) Aleksandar Vukic

The following players received entry into the singles main draw using their ITF World Tennis Ranking:

- (France) Sadio Doumbia
- (China) Li Zhe
- (Spain) Enrique López Pérez
- (Russia) Alexander Zhurbin

The following players received entry from the qualifying draw:

- (Australia) Andrew Harris
- (Chinese Taipei) Tseng Chun-hsin

== Women's singles main-draw entrants ==
=== Seeds ===
Country	Player	Rank^{1}	Seed
ESP	Aliona Bolsova Zadoinov	159	1
GBR	Gabriella Taylor	164	2
RUS	Anna Kalinskaya	168	3
GBR	Katie Swan	178	4
RUS	Liudmila Samsonova	182	5
KAZ	Elena Rybakina	183	6
ITA	Martina Trevisan	185	7
ITA	Jasmine Paolini	191	8

- ^{1} Rankings are as of 24 December 2018.

=== Other entrants ===
The following players received wildcards into the singles main draw:

- (Australia) Alexandra Bozovic
- (Australia) Gabriella Da Silva-Fick
- (Australia) Kaylah McPhee
- (Australia) Isabelle Wallace

The following players received entry into the singles main draw using their ITF World Tennis Rankings:

- (Japan) Haruna Arakawa
- (Czech Republic) Miriam Kolodziejová
- (Australia) Seone Mendez
- (Belgium) Greet Minnen
- (France) Irina Ramialison

The following players received entry from the qualifying draw:

- (Japan) Hiromi Abe
- (United States) Jennifer Elie
- (Argentina) Nadia Podoroska
- (Australia) Ivana Popovic
- (Switzerland) Lulu Sun
- (Australia) Belinda Woolcock

== Champions ==
=== Men's singles ===
- (Brazil) Rogério Dutra Silva def. (Germany) Mats Moraing 6–3, 6–2.

=== Women's singles ===
- (Russia) Anna Kalinskaya def. (Kazakhstan) Elena Rybakina, 6–4, 6–4

=== Men's doubles ===
- (Australia) Max Purcell / (Australia) Luke Saville def. (Uruguay) Ariel Behar / (Spain) Enrique López Pérez 6–4, 7–5.

=== Women's doubles ===
- (Italy) Giulia Gatto-Monticone / (Italy) Anastasia Grymalska def. (Australia) Amber Marshall / (Switzerland) Lulu Sun, 6–2, 6–3
