= 2022 City of Playford Tennis International – Men's doubles =

Men's doubles
- 2022 City of Playford Tennis International

Final
- Champions: (Australia) Jeremy Beale (Australia) Calum Puttergill
- Runners-up: (Japan) Rio Noguchi (Japan) Yusuke Takahashi
- Score: 7–6^{(7–2)}, 6–4

Events
Singles	men	women
Doubles	men	women
- City of Playford Tennis International

Jeremy Beale and Calum Puttergill won the title after defeating Rio Noguchi and Yusuke Takahashi 7–6^{(7–2)}, 6–4 in the final.

Harri Heliövaara and Patrik Niklas-Salminen were the defending champions but chose not to defend their title.

== Seeds ==
1. (Czech Republic) Marek Gengel / (Chinese Taipei) Hsu Yu-hsiou (quarterfinals)
2. (Australia) Dane Sweeny / (Australia) Li Tu (quarterfinals)
3. (Australia) Luke Saville / (Australia) Jordan Thompson (withdrew)
4. (Australia) Matthew Romios / (Australia) Jason Taylor (first round)

== Draw ==
Key

- Q = Qualifier
- WC = Wild card
- LL = Lucky loser
- Alt = Alternate
- ITF = ITF entry
- PR = Protected ranking
- SR = Special ranking
- SE = Special exempt
- JE = Junior exempt
- JR = Junior Accelerator Programme entrant
- CO = College Accelerator Programme entrant
- NG = Next Gen Accelerator Program entrant
- w/o = Walkover
- r = Retired
- d = Defaulted

First round
1	(Czech Republic) M Gengel (Chinese Taipei) Y-h Hsu	6	6
WC	(Australia) Mitchell Harper (Australia) A Walton	3	4
(Australia) D Kelly (Australia) M Purcell	6	4	[7]
PR	(Australia) J Beale (Australia) C Puttergill	4	6	[10]
Alt	(Japan) Yuichiro Inui (Australia) Zaharije-Zak Talic	3	2
(Australia) O Jasika (Australia) J McCabe	6	6
(Australia) A Addison (Australia) A Taylor	6	3	[5]
(United Kingdom) M Whitehouse (Australia) E Winter	4	6	[10]
(Japan) R Noguchi (Japan) Y Takahashi	7^{7}	6
WC	(Australia) Ja Delaney (Australia) Je Delaney	6^{1}	0
(United States) Kyle Seelig (Northern Mariana Islands) C Sinclair	6	6
4	(Australia) M Romios (Australia) J Taylor	3	2
(Australia) B Ellis (Australia) T Schoolkate	6	6
(New Zealand) A Rai (New Zealand) R Statham	1	0
(Australia) A Bolt (Australia) R Hijikata	6	4	[6]
2	(Australia) D Sweeny (Australia) L Tu	1	6	[10]

Quarterfinals
1	(Czech Republic) M Gengel (Chinese Taipei) Y-h Hsu	3	6	[10]
PR	(Australia) J Beale (Australia) C Puttergill	6	3	[12]
(Australia) O Jasika (Australia) J McCabe	7^{7}	7^{7}
(United Kingdom) M Whitehouse (Australia) E Winter	6^{4}	6^{2}
(Japan) R Noguchi (Japan) Y Takahashi	1	6	[10]
(United States) K Seelig (Northern Mariana Islands) C Sinclair	6	3	[8]
(Australia) B Ellis (Australia) T Schoolkate	6	6
2	(Australia) D Sweeny (Australia) L Tu	2	4

Semifinals
PR	(Australia) J Beale (Australia) C Puttergill	6	6
(Australia) O Jasika (Australia) J McCabe	2	4
(Japan) R Noguchi (Japan) Y Takahashi	6	6
(Australia) B Ellis (Australia) T Schoolkate	3	4

Final
PR	(Australia) J Beale (Australia) C Puttergill	7^{7}	6
(Japan) R Noguchi (Japan) Y Takahashi	6^{2}	4
