= 2019 City of Playford Tennis International II – Men's singles =

Men's singles
- 2019 City of Playford Tennis International II

Final
- Champion: (Australia) James Duckworth
- Runner-up: (Japan) Yasutaka Uchiyama
- Score: 7–6^{(7–2)}, 6–4

Events
Singles	men	women
Doubles	men	women
- City of Playford Tennis International

Rogério Dutra Silva was the defending champion but chose not to defend his title.

James Duckworth won the title after defeating Yasutaka Uchiyama 7–6^{(7–2)}, 6–4 in the final.

== Seeds ==
All seeds receive a bye into the second round.

1. (Japan) Yasutaka Uchiyama (final)
2. (Australia) James Duckworth (champion)
3. (Japan) Tatsuma Ito (semifinals, retired)
4. (Australia) Marc Polmans (semifinals)
5. (Australia) Alex Bolt (quarterfinals)
6. (Australia) Andrew Harris (quarterfinals, retired)
7. (United Kingdom) Jay Clarke (quarterfinals)
8. (Chile) Alejandro Tabilo (second round)
9. (Australia) Max Purcell (third round)
10. (India) Sasikumar Mukund (second round)
11. (Japan) Hiroki Moriya (third round)
12. (Australia) Akira Santillan (third round)
13. (Australia) Aleksandar Vukic (second round)
14. (Japan) Shuichi Sekiguchi (third round)
15. (Japan) Yosuke Watanuki (third round)
16. (Australia) Harry Bourchier (second round)

== Draw ==
Key

- Q = Qualifier
- WC = Wild card
- LL = Lucky loser
- Alt = Alternate
- ITF = ITF entry
- PR = Protected ranking
- SR = Special ranking
- SE = Special exempt
- JE = Junior exempt
- JR = Junior Accelerator Programme entrant
- CO = College Accelerator Programme entrant
- NG = Next Gen Accelerator Program entrant
- w/o = Walkover
- r = Retired
- d = Defaulted

=== Finals ===
Quarterfinals
1	(Japan) Yasutaka Uchiyama	4	3
6	(Australia) Andrew Harris	6	1^{r}
4	(Australia) Marc Polmans	3	6	6
(Australia) Luke Saville	6	1	0
5	(Australia) Alex Bolt	5	4
3	(Japan) Tatsuma Ito	7	6
7	(United Kingdom) Jay Clarke	3	3
2	(Australia) James Duckworth	6	6

Semifinals
1	(Japan) Yasutaka Uchiyama	6	7^{9}
4	(Australia) Marc Polmans	4	6^{7}
3	(Japan) Tatsuma Ito	5	0^{r}
2	(Australia) James Duckworth	7	2

Final
1	(Japan) Yasutaka Uchiyama	6^{2}	4
2	(Australia) James Duckworth	7^{7}	6

=== Top half ===
==== Section 1 ====
First round
(Dominican Republic) N Hardt	7	6
(Thailand) W Trongcharoenchaikul	5	2
(Germany) S Fanselow	6	7^{7}
(Australia) Cameron Green	4	6^{3}
(Germany) M Rosenkranz	4	3
(Russia) A Zakharov	6	6
WC	(Australia) D Sweeny	6	7^{9}
Q	(Australia) Mislav Bosnjak	3	6^{7}

Second round
1	(Japan) Y Uchiyama	6	6
(Dominican Republic) N Hardt	3	4
(Germany) S Fanselow	6^{5}	2
15	(Japan) Yo Watanuki	7^{7}	6
9	(Australia) M Purcell	7	6
(Russia) A Zakharov	5	3
WC	(Australia) D Sweeny	3	2
6	(Australia) A Harris	6	6

Third round
1	(Japan) Y Uchiyama	6	6
15	(Japan) Yo Watanuki	3	4
9	(Australia) M Purcell	6	5	2
6	(Australia) A Harris	4	7	6

Quarterfinals
1	(Japan) Y Uchiyama	4	3
6	(Australia) A Harris	6	1^{r}

==== Section 2 ====
First round
(Australia) Jacob Grills	7^{7}	6
WC	(Australia) B Walkin	6^{4}	1
(Australia) David Barclay	6	3	6^{5}
(Australia) M Romios	1	6	7^{7}
PR	(Australia) B Mousley	2	1
(United States) Gage Brymer	6	6
(Australia) L Saville	7^{7}	6
(Germany) Lucas Gerch	6^{2}	3

Second round
4	(Australia) M Polmans	6	4	6
(Australia) J Grills	4	6	3
(Australia) M Romios	3	1
14	(Japan) Shuichi Sekiguchi	6	6
12	(Australia) A Santillan	6	6
(United States) G Brymer	1	3
(Australia) L Saville	3	6	6
8	(Chile) A Tabilo	6	4	1

Third round
4	(Australia) M Polmans	6	6
14	(Japan) S Sekiguchi	3	4
12	(Australia) A Santillan	6	6^{2}	2
(Australia) L Saville	3	7^{7}	6

Quarterfinals
4	(Australia) M Polmans	3	6	6
(Australia) L Saville	6	1	0

=== Bottom half ===
==== Section 3 ====
First round
(Finland) P Niklas-Salminen	6	6
(Australia) M Banes	3	2
(United States) E King	6	6
WC	(Australia) C Puttergill	0	2
(Australia) B Mott	6	7
(Chile) MT Barrios Vera	3	5
(Australia) D Kelly	0^{r}
(United Kingdom) B Klein	4

Second round
5	(Australia) A Bolt	6	7^{7}
(Finland) P Niklas-Salminen	3	6^{3}
(United States) E King	6^{5}	4
11	(Japan) H Moriya	7^{7}	6
16	(Australia) H Bourchier	6	2	2
(Australia) B Mott	4	6	6
(United Kingdom) B Klein	4	4
3	(Japan) T Ito	6	6

Third round
5	(Australia) A Bolt	6	6
11	(Japan) H Moriya	4	0
(Australia) B Mott	4	6^{7}
3	(Japan) T Ito	6	7^{9}

Quarterfinals
5	(Australia) A Bolt	5	4
3	(Japan) T Ito	7	6

==== Section 4 ====
First round
(Australia) T Fancutt	6	6
(Australia) William Ma	4	1
Q	(Australia) James Ibrahim	1	2
(Finland) H Heliövaara	6	6
WC	(Australia) Matthew Dellavedova	3	2
WC	(Australia) T Schoolkate	6	6
(Australia) Alexander Crnokrak	6	6
(Switzerland) L Castelnuovo	3	4

Second round
7	(United Kingdom) J Clarke	6^{2}	6	7
(Australia) T Fancutt	7^{7}	4	5
(Finland) H Heliövaara	7^{7}	6
10	(India) S Mukund	6^{4}	3
13	(Australia) A Vukic	5	6	4
WC	(Australia) T Schoolkate	7	4	6
(Australia) A Crnokrak	3	5
2	(Australia) J Duckworth	6	7

Third round
7	(United Kingdom) J Clarke	6	6
(Finland) H Heliövaara	4	3
WC	(Australia) T Schoolkate	1	3
2	(Australia) J Duckworth	6	6

Quarterfinals
7	(United Kingdom) J Clarke	3	3
2	(Australia) J Duckworth	6	6
