= 2018 City of Playford Tennis International – Men's singles =

Men's singles
- 2018 City of Playford Tennis International

Final
- Champion: (Australia) Jason Kubler
- Runner-up: (Canada) Brayden Schnur
- Score: 6–4, 6–2

Events
Singles	men	women
Doubles	men	women
- City of Playford Tennis International

This was the first edition of the tournament.

Jason Kubler won the title after defeating Brayden Schnur 6–4, 6–2 in the final.

== Seeds ==
1. (Russia) Daniil Medvedev (first round)
2. (United States) Bjorn Fratangelo (first round)
3. (Switzerland) Henri Laaksonen (first round)
4. (Ukraine) Sergiy Stakhovsky (first round)
5. (Germany) Oscar Otte (second round)
6. (Slovakia) Norbert Gombos (quarterfinals)
7. (Lithuania) Ričardas Berankis (first round)
8. (Belarus) Uladzimir Ignatik (second round)

== Draw ==
Key

- Q = Qualifier
- WC = Wild card
- LL = Lucky loser
- Alt = Alternate
- ITF = ITF entry
- PR = Protected ranking
- SR = Special ranking
- SE = Special exempt
- JE = Junior exempt
- JR = Junior Accelerator Programme entrant
- CO = College Accelerator Programme entrant
- NG = Next Gen Accelerator Program entrant
- w/o = Walkover
- r = Retired
- d = Defaulted

=== Finals ===
Semifinals
(Canada) Brayden Schnur	6	7^{7}
(United States) Evan King	3	6^{3}
(United States) Reilly Opelka	6^{3}	3
Q	(Australia) Jason Kubler	7^{7}	6

Final
(Canada) Brayden Schnur	4	2
Q	(Australia) Jason Kubler	6	6

=== Top half ===
First round
1	(Russia) D Medvedev	7	4	4
Q	(Australia) M Matosevic	5	6	6
(Germany) T Kamke	6	6
(Argentina) G Andreozzi	4	4
(Canada) B Schnur	6	6
(Japan) Y Nishioka	4	3
(Barbados) D King	4	4
5	(Germany) O Otte	6	6
3	(Switzerland) H Laaksonen	3	3
Q	(Australia) M Banes	6	6
WC	(Australia) A Popyrin	4	1
(United States) E King	6	6
(Japan) Y Uchiyama	4	6	3
Q	(France) H Grenier	6	3	6
(Italy) L Sonego	4	6	6^{4}
6	(Slovakia) N Gombos	6	4	7^{7}

Second round
Q	(Australia) M Matosevic	6	6
(Germany) T Kamke	2	0
(Canada) B Schnur	6	3	6
5	(Germany) O Otte	2	6	2
Q	(Australia) M Banes	4	7^{7}	4
(United States) E King	6	6^{3}	6
Q	(France) H Grenier	4	6	1
6	(Slovakia) N Gombos	6	4	6

Quarterfinals
Q	(Australia) M Matosevic	7^{7}	5	6^{3}
(Canada) B Schnur	6^{4}	7	7^{7}
(United States) E King	6	7
6	(Slovakia) N Gombos	4	5

Semifinals
(Canada) B Schnur	6	7^{7}
(United States) E King	3	6^{3}

=== Bottom half ===
First round
7	(Lithuania) R Berankis	7^{9}	6^{6}	5
(United States) R Opelka	6^{7}	7^{8}	7
(Serbia) P Krstin	6	6^{1}	5
(Poland) K Majchrzak	4	7^{7}	7
WC	(Australia) M Purcell	4	7^{10}	2
WC	(Australia) O Jasika	6	6^{8}	6
(United States) T Paul	3	7	7
4	(Ukraine) S Stakhovsky	6	5	5
8	(Belarus) U Ignatik	6	6
(United States) M McDonald	4	4
(Australia) A Whittington	6^{5}	3
Q	(Australia) J Kubler	7^{7}	6
(Belgium) A De Greef	3	4
(Australia) A Bolt	6	6
WC	(Australia) M Polmans	6	5	6
2	(United States) B Fratangelo	3	7	4

Second round
(United States) R Opelka	7^{11}	7^{10}
(Poland) K Majchrzak	6^{9}	6^{8}
WC	(Australia) O Jasika	6	6
(United States) T Paul	3	3
8	(Belarus) U Ignatik	4	4
Q	(Australia) J Kubler	6	6
(Australia) A Bolt	6	6
WC	(Australia) M Polmans	4	3

Quarterfinals
(United States) R Opelka	7^{7}	5	6
WC	(Australia) O Jasika	6^{5}	7	4
Q	(Australia) J Kubler	6	6
(Australia) A Bolt	3	3

Semifinals
(United States) R Opelka	6^{3}	3
Q	(Australia) J Kubler	7^{7}	6
