= 2018 City of Playford Tennis International – Men's doubles =

Men's doubles
- 2018 City of Playford Tennis International

Final
- Champions: (United States) Mackenzie McDonald (United States) Tommy Paul
- Runners-up: (Australia) Maverick Banes (Australia) Jason Kubler
- Score: 7–6^{(7–4)}, 6–4

Events
Singles	men	women
Doubles	men	women
- City of Playford Tennis International

This was the first edition of the tournament.

Mackenzie McDonald and Tommy Paul won the title after defeating Maverick Banes and Jason Kubler 7–6^{(7–4)}, 6–4 in the final.

== Seeds ==
1. (Australia) Marc Polmans / (Australia) Andrew Whittington (quarterfinals)
2. (Australia) Alex Bolt / (Australia) Bradley Mousley (first round)
3. (Australia) Steven de Waard / (United Kingdom) Brydan Klein (first round)
4. (Australia) Max Purcell / (Australia) Luke Saville (semifinals)

== Draw ==
Key

- Q = Qualifier
- WC = Wild card
- LL = Lucky loser
- Alt = Alternate
- ITF = ITF entry
- PR = Protected ranking
- SR = Special ranking
- SE = Special exempt
- JE = Junior exempt
- JR = Junior Accelerator Programme entrant
- CO = College Accelerator Programme entrant
- NG = Next Gen Accelerator Program entrant
- w/o = Walkover
- r = Retired
- d = Defaulted

First round
1	(Australia) M Polmans (Australia) A Whittington	6	6
WC	(Australia) A Harris (Australia) D Kelly	2	0
(Barbados) D King (United States) E King	2	6	[12]
WC	(Australia) M Banes (Australia) J Kubler	6	0	[14]
4	(Australia) M Purcell (Australia) L Saville	6	3	[10]
(Poland) K Majchrzak (Italy) L Sonego	2	6	[8]
(Slovakia) N Gombos (Belarus) U Ignatik	6^{3}	6^{2}
WC	(Australia) O Jasika (Australia) C O'Connell	7^{7}	7^{7}
(Japan) Y Nishioka (Japan) Y Uchiyama	3	5
(United States) M McDonald (United States) T Paul	6	7
(Lithuania) R Berankis (Ukraine) S Stakhovsky	6	7^{8}
3	(Australia) S de Waard (United Kingdom) B Klein	2	6^{6}
(Argentina) G Andreozzi (Belgium) A De Greef	3	6	[9]
(United States) B Fratangelo (Canada) B Schnur	6	3	[11]
(Germany) T Kamke (Germany) O Otte	6	6
2	(Australia) A Bolt (Australia) B Mousley	4	4

Quarterfinals
1	(Australia) M Polmans (Australia) A Whittington	4	3
WC	(Australia) M Banes (Australia) J Kubler	6	6
4	(Australia) M Purcell (Australia) L Saville	6	6
WC	(Australia) O Jasika (Australia) C O'Connell	3	3
(United States) M McDonald (United States) T Paul	w/o
(Lithuania) R Berankis (Ukraine) S Stakhovsky
(United States) B Fratangelo (Canada) B Schnur
(Germany) T Kamke (Germany) O Otte	w/o

Semifinals
WC	(Australia) M Banes (Australia) J Kubler	6^{5}	7^{7}	[10]
4	(Australia) M Purcell (Australia) L Saville	7^{7}	6^{3}	[3]
(United States) M McDonald (United States) T Paul	6	6
(Germany) T Kamke (Germany) O Otte	4	4

Final
WC	(Australia) M Banes (Australia) J Kubler	6^{4}	4
(United States) M McDonald (United States) T Paul	7^{7}	6
