= 2022 City of Playford Tennis International – Men's singles =

Men's singles
- 2022 City of Playford Tennis International

Final
- Champion: (Australia) Rinky Hijikata
- Runner-up: (Japan) Rio Noguchi
- Score: 6–1, 6–1

Events
Singles	men	women
Doubles	men	women
- City of Playford Tennis International

James Duckworth was the defending champion but lost in the quarterfinals to Rinky Hijikata.

Hijikata won the title after defeating Rio Noguchi 6–1, 6–1 in the final.

== Seeds ==
1. (Australia) Jordan Thompson (quarterfinals)
2. (Australia) James Duckworth (quarterfinals)
3. (Australia) Aleksandar Vukic (first round)
4. (Australia) Li Tu (first round)
5. (Australia) Rinky Hijikata (champion)
6. (Japan) Rio Noguchi (final)
7. (Australia) Dane Sweeny (second round)
8. (Australia) Omar Jasika (semifinals)

== Draw ==
Key

- Q = Qualifier
- WC = Wild card
- LL = Lucky loser
- Alt = Alternate
- ITF = ITF entry
- PR = Protected ranking
- SR = Special ranking
- SE = Special exempt
- JE = Junior exempt
- JR = Junior Accelerator Programme entrant
- CO = College Accelerator Programme entrant
- NG = Next Gen Accelerator Program entrant
- w/o = Walkover
- r = Retired
- d = Defaulted

=== Finals ===
Semifinals
6	(Japan) Rio Noguchi	7^{7}	7
8	(Australia) Omar Jasika	6^{4}	5
(Australia) Max Purcell	1	1
5	(Australia) Rinky Hijikata	6	6

Final
6	(Japan) Rio Noguchi	1	1
5	(Australia) Rinky Hijikata	6	6

=== Top half ===
First round
1	(Australia) J Thompson	3	6	6
(Australia) J McCabe	6	3	4
PR	(Australia) J Beale	0	4
(Australia) T Schoolkate	6	6
Q	(Australia) L Saville	2	6	6
(United States) Kyle Seelig	6	4	2
Q	(Australia) C Puttergill	0	3
6	(Japan) R Noguchi	6	6
4	(Australia) L Tu	4	4
(New Zealand) R Statham	6	6
Q	(Australia) B Mott	3	7	3
(Australia) D Kelly	6	5	6
WC	(Australia) B Ellis	6	7^{7}
Q	(Japan) Y Takahashi	2	6^{2}
(United Kingdom) M Whitehouse	4	4
8	(Australia) O Jasika	6	6

Second round
1	(Australia) J Thompson	6	7
(Australia) T Schoolkate	3	5
Q	(Australia) L Saville	7^{9}	4	5
6	(Japan) R Noguchi	6^{7}	6	7
(New Zealand) R Statham	6	2	6^{2}
(Australia) D Kelly	3	6	7^{7}
WC	(Australia) B Ellis	3	4
8	(Australia) O Jasika	6	6

Quarterfinals
1	(Australia) J Thompson	1	4
6	(Japan) R Noguchi	6	6
(Australia) D Kelly	1	4
8	(Australia) O Jasika	6	6

Semifinals
6	(Japan) R Noguchi	7^{7}	7
8	(Australia) O Jasika	6^{4}	5

=== Bottom half ===
First round
7	(Australia) D Sweeny	3	6	6
WC	(Australia) E Winter	6	3	2
(Chinese Taipei) Y-h Hsu	6	6
(India) M Sasikumar	4	2
Q	(Australia) Jeremy Jin	2	2
(Australia) M Purcell	6	6
(Northern Mariana Islands) C Sinclair	6	3	6
3	(Australia) A Vukic	4	6	2
5	(Australia) R Hijikata	6	6
(Australia) P Sekulic	2	2
(Australia) A Walton	6	3	5
Q	(New Zealand) A Rai	2	6	7
(Czech Republic) M Gengel	3	6	7^{7}
WC	(Australia) A Bolt	6	4	6^{4}
(India) P Gunneswaran	5	1
2	(Australia) J Duckworth	7	6

Second round
7	(Australia) D Sweeny	6^{5}	2
(Chinese Taipei) Y-h Hsu	7^{7}	6
(Australia) M Purcell	7	6
(Northern Mariana Islands) C Sinclair	5	1
5	(Australia) R Hijikata	6	6
Q	(New Zealand) A Rai	3	2
(Czech Republic) M Gengel	1	2
2	(Australia) J Duckworth	6	6

Quarterfinals
(Chinese Taipei) Y-h Hsu	6	4	4
(Australia) M Purcell	2	6	6
5	(Australia) R Hijikata	4	6	6
2	(Australia) J Duckworth	6	1	2

Semifinals
(Australia) M Purcell	1	1
5	(Australia) R Hijikata	6	6
