= City of Playford Tennis International =

Tennis tournament in Australia

Tournament information
- Event name: City of Playford Tennis International
- Founded: 2018
- Location: City of Playford, Australia
- Venue: Playford City Tennis Centre
- Surface: Hard
- Website: Website
ATP Tour
- Category: ATP Challenger Tour
- Draw: 32S/17Q/16D
- Prize money: $75,000 (2025)
WTA Tour
- Category: ITF Women's Circuit
- Draw: 32S/64Q/16D
- Prize money: $60,000 / $25,000 (2025)

The City of Playford Tennis International is a professional tennis tournament played on outdoor hard courts. It is currently part of the ATP Challenger Tour and the International Tennis Federation (ITF) Women's Circuit. It is held annually at the Playford City Tennis Centre in Playford, Australia, since 2018. The men's event replaces the City of Onkaparinga ATP Challenger held from 2015 until 2017.

== Past finals ==
=== Men's singles ===
Year	Champion	Runner-up	Score
2025	(Australia) Rinky Hijikata	(Australia) Dane Sweeny	6–0, 6–7^{(8–10)}, 6–4
2024	(Australia) Rinky Hijikata	(Japan) Yuta Shimizu	6–4, 7–6^{(7–4)}
2023	(Australia) James Duckworth	(Hong Kong) Coleman Wong	7–5, 7–5
2022	(Australia) Rinky Hijikata	(Japan) Rio Noguchi	6–1, 6–1
2020–21	Cancelled due to the COVID-19 pandemic		
2019 (2)	(Australia) James Duckworth	(Japan) Yasutaka Uchiyama	7–6^{(7–2)}, 6–4
2019 (1)	(Brazil) Rogério Dutra Silva	(Germany) Mats Moraing	6–3, 6–2
2018	(Australia) Jason Kubler	(Canada) Brayden Schnur	6–4, 6–2

=== Women's singles ===
Year	Champion	Runner-up	Score
2025	(Australia) Emerson Jones	(Australia) Maddison Inglis	6–4, 6–4
2024	(Australia) Maddison Inglis	(Japan) Himeno Sakatsume	7–6^{(9–7)}, 5–7, 6–1
2023	(Australia) Astra Sharma	(Chinese Taipei) Joanna Garland	7–6^{(8–6)}, 6–0
2022	(Australia) Kimberly Birrell	(Australia) Maddison Inglis	3–6, 7–5, 6–4
2020–21	Cancelled due to the COVID-19 pandemic		
2019 (2)	(Australia) Storm Sanders	(Australia) Lizette Cabrera	6–3, 6–4
2019 (1)	(Russia) Anna Kalinskaya	(Kazakhstan) Elena Rybakina	6–4, 6–4
2018	(Australia) Zoe Hives	(Australia) Alexandra Bozovic	6–4, 5–7, 7–6^{(7–4)}

=== Men's doubles ===
Year	Champions	Runners-up	Score
2025	(Australia) Jake Delaney (Australia) Li Tu	(India) Anirudh Chandrasekar (United States) Reese Stalder	6–7^{(5–7)}, 7–5, [10–8]
2024	(Australia) Blake Ellis (Australia) Thomas Fancutt	(Australia) Jake Delaney (Australia) Jesse Delaney	6–1, 5–7, [10–5]
2023	(United States) Ryan Seggerman (United States) Patrik Trhac	(Australia) Blake Ellis (Australia) Tristan Schoolkate	6–3, 7–6^{(7–3)}
2022	(Australia) Jeremy Beale (Australia) Calum Puttergill	(Japan) Rio Noguchi (Japan) Yusuke Takahashi	7–6^{(7–2)}, 6–4
2020–21	Cancelled due to the COVID-19 pandemic		
2019 (2)	(Finland) Harri Heliövaara (Finland) Patrik Niklas-Salminen	(Philippines) Ruben Gonzales (United States) Evan King	6–4, 6–7^{(4–7)}, [10–7]
2019 (1)	(Australia) Max Purcell (Australia) Luke Saville	(Uruguay) Ariel Behar (Spain) Enrique López Pérez	6–4, 7–5
2018	(United States) Mackenzie McDonald (United States) Tommy Paul	(Australia) Maverick Banes (Australia) Jason Kubler	7–6^{(7–4)}, 6–4

=== Women's doubles ===
Year	Champion	Runner-up	Score
2025	(Australia) Talia Gibson (Australia) Maddison Inglis	(South Korea) Back Da-yeon (South Korea) Lee Eun-hye	6–2, 6–0
2024	(Australia) Alexandra Bozovic (Australia) Petra Hule	(Australia) Lizette Cabrera (Australia) Taylah Preston	6–4, 6–3
2023	(Australia) Talia Gibson (Australia) Priscilla Hon	(Australia) Kaylah McPhee (Australia) Astra Sharma	6–1, 6–2
2022	(Australia) Alexandra Bozovic (Australia) Talia Gibson	(South Korea) Han Na-lae (Indonesia) Priska Madelyn Nugroho	7–5, 6–4
2020–21	Cancelled due to the COVID-19 pandemic		
2019 (2)	(United States) Asia Muhammad (Australia) Storm Sanders	(United Kingdom) Naiktha Bains (Slovakia) Tereza Mihalíková	6–3, 6–4
2019 (1)	(Italy) Giulia Gatto-Monticone (Italy) Anastasia Grymalska	(Australia) Amber Marshall (Switzerland) Lulu Sun	6–2, 6–3
2018	(Slovenia) Dalila Jakupović (Russia) Irina Khromacheva	(Japan) Junri Namigata (Japan) Erika Sema	2–6, 7–5, [10–5]
