= Amber Marshall (tennis) =

Australian tennis player

- Country (sports): Australia
- Born: 19 July 2001 (age 24) Payneham South
- Height: 169 cm (5 ft 7 in)
- Plays: Right (two-handed backhand)
- Prize money: $14,462

Singles
- Career record: 25–23
- Career titles: 0
- Highest ranking: No. 610 (17 February 2020)

Doubles
- Career record: 15–14
- Career titles: 1 ITF
- Highest ranking: No. 455 (17 February 2020)

Amber Marshall (born 19 July 2001) is a former professional tennis player from Australia.

Marshall has a career-high singles ranking by the WTA of 610, achieved on 17 February 2020, and a career-high WTA doubles ranking of 455, achieved on the same date. Marshall has won one ITF doubles title.

She made her Grand Slam main-draw debut, after winning the 2020 Australian Open Women's Doubles Wildcard Playoff, granting her a wildcard into the 2020 Australian Open women's doubles event alongside Alexandra Bozovic.

== ITF finals ==
=== Doubles (1–1) ===
$100,000 tournaments
$75,000 tournaments
$60,000 tournaments
$25,000 tournaments
$15,000 tournaments

Result	Date	Tournament	Surface	Partner	Opponents	Score
Loss	6 January 2019	Playford International, Australia	Hard	(Switzerland) Lulu Sun	(Italy) Giulia Gatto-Monticone (Italy) Anastasia Grymalska	2–6, 3–6
Win	16 February 2019	ITF Port Pirie, Australia	Hard	(New Zealand) Valentina Ivanov	(Germany) Patricia Böntgen (Australia) Lisa Mays	7–5, 6–2
