= Storm Hunter =

Australian tennis player (born 1994)

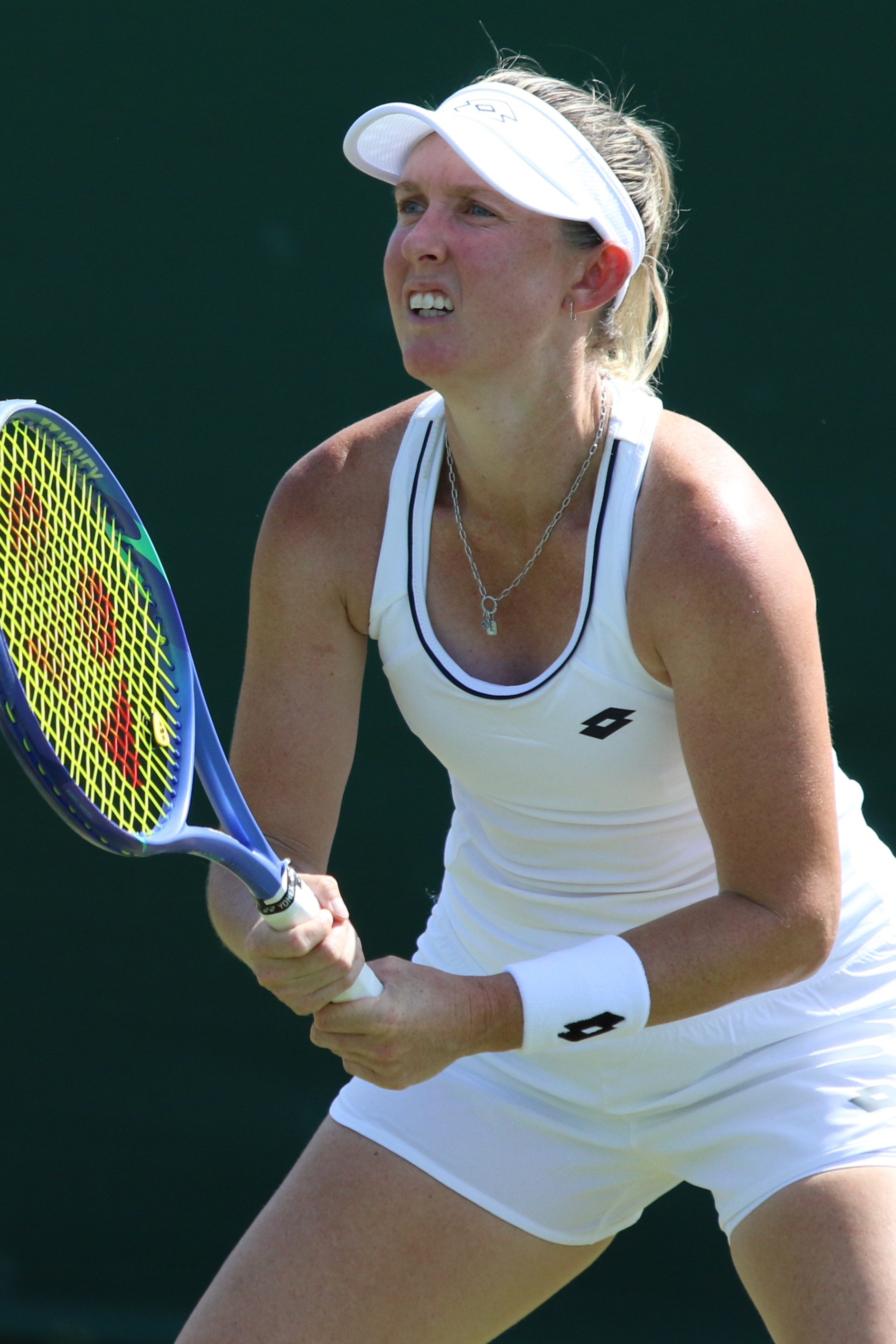
- Hunter at the 2026 Wimbledon Championships
- Country (sports): Australia
- Born: 11 August 1994 (age 32) Rockhampton, Queensland, Australia
- Height: 1.66 m (5 ft 5 in)
- Plays: Left (two-handed backhand)
- Coach: Nicole Pratt
- Prize money: US$ 4,562,232

Singles
- Career record: 256–207
- Career titles: 0 WTA, 3 ITF
- Highest ranking: No. 114 (1 April 2024)
- Current ranking: No. 151 (19 October 2026)

Grand Slam singles results
- Australian Open: 3R (2024)
- French Open: 2R (2023)
- Wimbledon: 1R (2023)
- US Open: 1R (2021, 2023, 2026)

Doubles
- Career record: 322–192
- Career titles: 11
- Highest ranking: No. 1 (6 November 2023)
- Current ranking: No. 20 (19 October 2026)

Grand Slam doubles results
- Australian Open: SF (2024)
- French Open: 3R (2023)
- Wimbledon: F (2023)
- US Open: SF (2022)

Other doubles tournaments
- Tour Finals: SF (2023)

Mixed doubles
- Career titles: 1

Grand Slam mixed doubles results
- Australian Open: SF (2021)
- French Open: 2R (2022, 2023)
- Wimbledon: F (2026)
- US Open: W (2022)

Team competitions
- Fed Cup: F (2022); Record: 7–4
- Last updated on: 19 October 2025.

Storm Hunter (née Sanders; born 11 August 1994) is an Australian professional tennis player. She reached world No. 1 in doubles on 6 November 2023, becoming the third Australian woman to hold the top spot. She also has a career-high singles ranking of world No. 114 on 1 April 2024.

Hunter won her first major title in mixed doubles at the 2022 US Open. She has also won 11 doubles titles on the WTA Tour, one doubles title on the WTA Challenger Tour as well as three singles titles and thirteen doubles titles on the ITF Women's Circuit.

Hunter debuted on the ITF Junior Circuit in December 2007, and on the senior circuit in November 2008. She won her first professional tournament in February 2013.

She also represented Australia at the 2020 Summer Olympics, which due to the COVID-19 pandemic were held in 2021, reaching the quarterfinals in the women's doubles competition.

== Early life ==
Hunter was born in Rockhampton, where she began playing tennis at the age of six after watching the Australian Open on television. Her father signed her up with a local tennis club where she was coached by Robert Beak. Her initial progress was slow - in Beak's words Storm "wasn't the most talented" despite her strong work ethic and determination - until, according to Beak, Hunter's skills suddenly and rapidly improved after "something clicked".

Beak coached Hunter until she relocated to Perth with her parents in 2005. Hunter continued playing tennis and returned to Queensland the following year to represent Western Australia in the Bruce Cup in Mackay in August 2006 and to compete in the Head Queensland State Age Championships in Rockhampton in September 2006.

Hunter graduated from the School of Isolated and Distance Education in Western Australia in 2011, after which she received a Melbourne-based tennis scholarship. In 2013, Hunter began attending the University of Canberra where she studied a Bachelor of Science in Psychology degree.

Storm's parents and younger brother all serve in the Australian Defence Force.

== Career ==
=== 2013: Top 500 ===
Hunter began the year ranked 674 in the world. Her first tournament was the Sydney International, where she received a wildcard into qualifying. She stunned Eugenie Bouchard in the first round in two tiebreak sets, but lost in the second round against Misaki Doi. (Note: To obtain data from this reference, select the corresponding year on the WTA or ITF website.) She then received a wildcard into qualifying at the Australian Open where she lost in the first round against Yuliya Beygelzimer. In February, after failing to qualify for the Burnie International, Hunter celebrated a breakthrough victory, winning the 25k Launceston Tennis International. She won through both, the qualifying and main draws, without dropping a set. She also achieved the rare feat of defeating the top seeds in both the qualifying draw (Mari Tanaka) and the main draw (Olivia Rogowska) en route to victory. She reached the top 500 in the WTA rankings for the first time after the tournament win. A month later, she reached the final of the $25k event in Ipswich, Queensland, losing to Jelena Pandžić in three sets.

In July, together with her British partner Naomi Broady, Hunter won the 50k Gold River Challenger, defeating Robin Anderson and Lauren Embree, in straight sets.

In the US Open qualifying, she lost in the first round to Nigina Abduraimova from Uzbekistan. Hunter year rank was 242 in the world.

=== 2014: Major singles debut ===
Hunter began the season at the Brisbane International, having received a wildcard into qualifying. She opened with a three-set win over Irina-Camelia Begu. Although taking the opening set, Hunter lost against third seed Hsieh Su-wei in the second round, in three sets.

The following week, she was awarded a wildcard to the main draw of the Hobart International. A first-round win over Peng Shuai saw her match up with second seed Kirsten Flipkens. Pushing the top-20 ranked Belgian to the brink, Hunter lost in a tough three-set match, lasting over two and a half hours. Despite the close loss, it was announced that she had been given a wildcard into the singles main draw of the Australian Open, having been given wildcards for the doubles draw the previous two years. She played Camila Giorgi in round one, losing on her major singles debut, in three sets. She also lost in the first round of women's and mixed doubles.

=== 2015–2016: Canberra doubles title ===
Given a wildcard for the 2015 Hobart International, Hunter lost in round one to Camila Giorgi, in three sets. She was then given a wildcard for the 2015 Australian Open, but lost at the first stage again, this time to world No. 46, Klára Koukalová, in straight sets.

In July 2016, she qualified for the Jiangxi International – the first time Hunter had come through qualifying at a WTA Tour-level event. She lost to Vania King in the first round. In October, she reached the second round of the Toowoomba ITF event. In November, she won the ITF Canberra doubles title with Jessica Moore.

=== 2017: First WTA Tour doubles title ===
She attempted to qualify for the Hobart International and Australian Open, losing in the first round. Her best singles performance was a quarterfinal appearance in September at the ITF Brisbane.

In doubles, Hunter won the Nottingham Open, with Monique Adamczak in June. It was their first WTA Tour title. She made two further WTA tournament finals that year.

=== 2018–2020: Two year hiatus, WTA doubles title ===
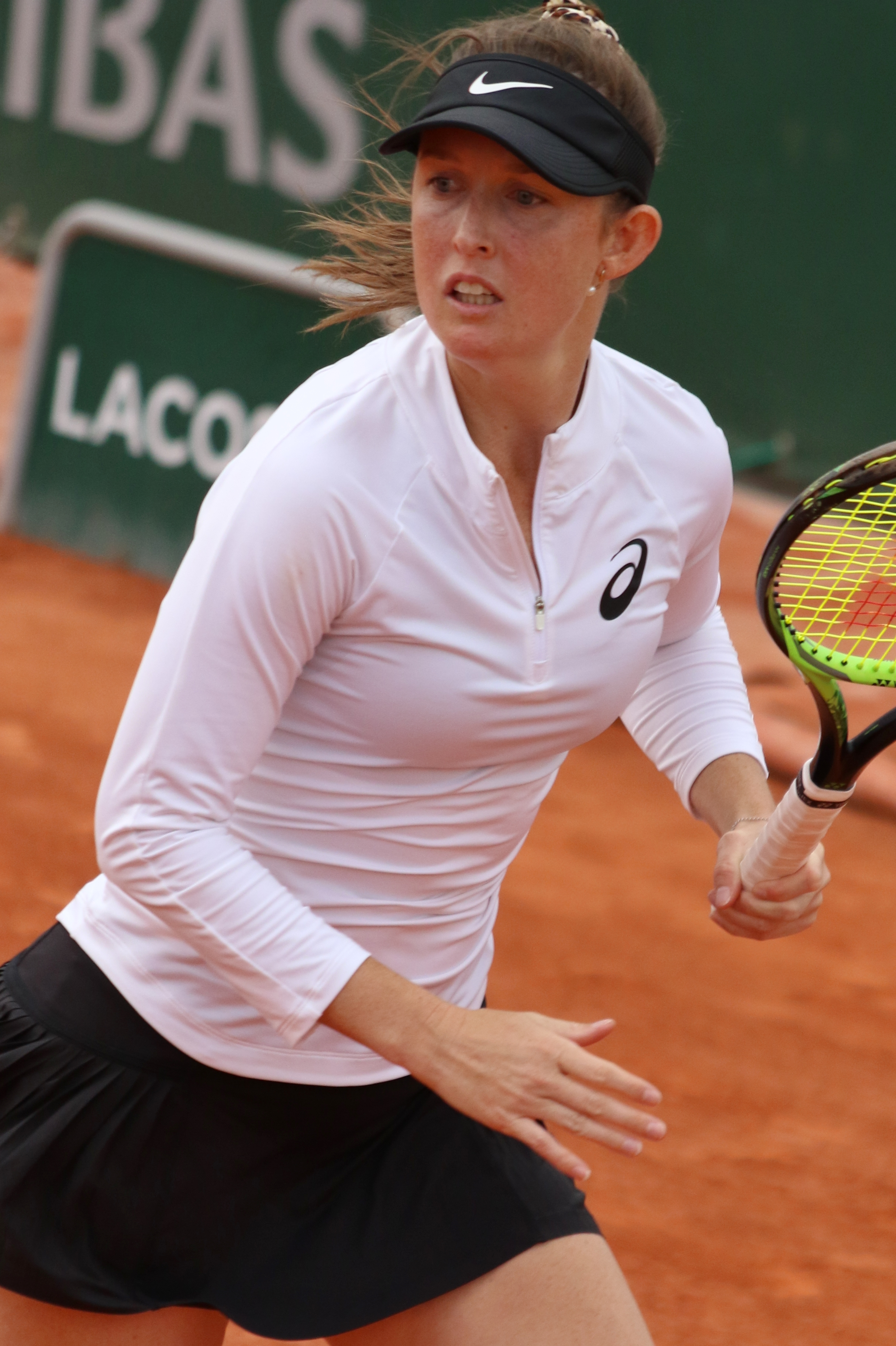
Hunter at the 2019 French Open

Hunter played four doubles tournaments in 2018, losing all four in the first round. In 2019, she said "I started getting some shoulder pain which got more intense. I played the Aussie Open that year just focusing on doubles, but after that I stopped playing completely and was basically out for all of 2018."

Hunter returned to singles competition in October 2019, after almost a two-year absence. She won the Playford International in her second tournament back. In doubles, she won four ITF Circuit titles in 2019.

She won her second career doubles title at the 2020 Thailand Open.

=== 2021: WTA Tour quarterfinals, major doubles semifinal ===
Hunter made the semifinals in mixed doubles at the Australian Open with Marc Polmans.

In February, she qualified for and defeated four higher-ranked opponents to advance to her first tour-level singles quarterfinal at the Adelaide International, eventually losing to Belinda Bencic. In March, Hunter entered the WTA top 200 for the first time at No. 199 on 1 March 2021. She received a wildcard for her debut at the WTA 1000 level at the 2021 Miami Open and recorded her first win against qualifier Elisabetta Cocciaretto.

In May, she qualified for a Grand Slam tournament in singles for the first time at the French Open.

In June at Wimbledon, she reached the semifinals in women's doubles with Caroline Dolehide.

In July, Hunter reached her second tour-level quarterfinal at the Prague Open. She also reached the semifinals in doubles at the same event. At the Tokyo Olympics, Hunter partnered Ashleigh Barty in the ladies' doubles and they reached the quarterfinals.

In November, Hunter represented Australia at the BJK Cup Finals. She recorded the biggest win of her singles career, beating world No. 18, Belgian Elise Mertens, in her BJK Cup debut. She then defeated Belarusian Yuliya Hatouka promoting Australia to the semifinals where she lost to Swiss Jil Teichmann.

=== 2022: First WTA 1000 doubles title, US Open mixed doubles champion ===
In January 2022, Hunter won her third and the biggest WTA Tour title, at the Adelaide International, alongside Ashleigh Barty.

In doubles, she reached the quarterfinals at the Australian Open and at the Indian Wells Open, partnering Caroline Dolehide. In singles, she entered the Miami Open as a lucky loser replacing seventh seed Garbiñe Muguruza in the second round.

Seeded as the top pair at the Madrid Open, she reached the semifinals of WTA 1000 for the first time in her career, and the quarterfinals at the Italian Open and at the Canadian Open partnering Zhang Shuai.

In September, Hunter reached the semifinals in doubles at the US Open also with Caroline Dolehide. At the same tournament, she teamed up with John Peers to win the mixed doubles title defeating Kirsten Flipkens and Édouard Roger-Vasselin in an epic three-set match.

The following month, Hunter won her first WTA 1000 title, partnering Luisa Stefani, at the Guadalajara Open. As a result, she stormed into the top 10 in the doubles rankings at world No. 8 on 24 October 2022.

=== 2023: Two WTA 1000 titles, Wimbledon doubles final, No. 1 in doubles ===
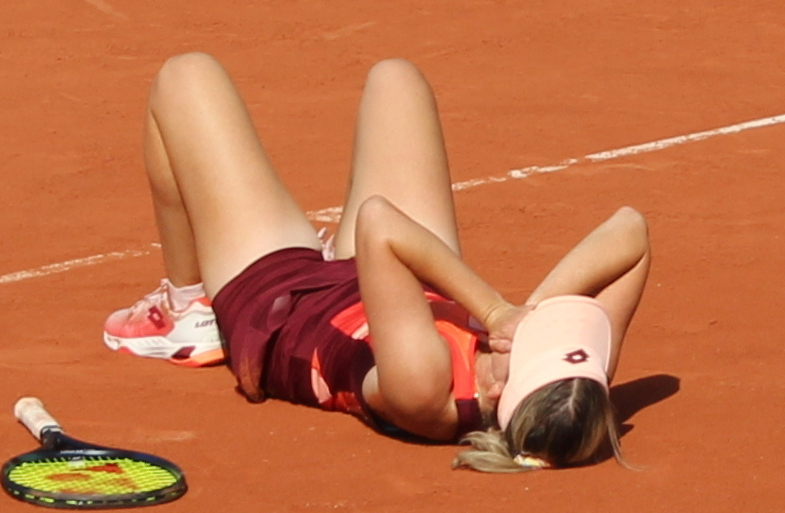
Hunter on the French Open clay after qualifying in singles in 2023

She reached back-to-back quarterfinals at the Australian Open with new partner Elise Mertens but fell to Marta Kostyuk and Elena-Gabriela Ruse.

At the Miami Open, she qualified for the main draw but lost in the first round to Sofia Kenin. In doubles at the same tournament, she reached back-to-back quarterfinals with Mertens at a WTA 1000 level, following a quarterfinal showing in Indian Wells.

At the Italian Open, Hunter won her second WTA 1000 title partnering with Mertens. As a result, she reached world No. 5 in doubles on 22 May 2023.

She qualified for the French Open in singles for the second time and recorded her first win at a major over Nuria Párrizas Díaz. At the same tournament in doubles, she lost in the third round with Mertens to 15th seeds Veronika Kudermetova and Liudmila Samsonova, and in mixed doubles, she reached the second round with compatriot John Peers.

Hunter qualified for the singles main draw at Wimbledon, thus completing the set of major appearances in singles. She made more personal history at the same event by reaching her first Grand Slam women's doubles final alongside partner Mertens going down 5-7, 4-6 to the unseeded duo of Hsieh Su-wei and Barbora Strýcová.

She won her second WTA 1000 title with Mertens at the Guadalajara Open and third at this level, defeating Erin Routliffe and Gabriela Dabrowski. She reached world No. 2 in the doubles rankings on 25 September 2023. At the same tournament she won her first round match in singles against Irina Shymanovich, her first win at this level since Miami 2021. She lost to second seed and eventual finalist Maria Sakkari. With reaching the semifinals at the 2023 WTA Finals, Hunter became world No. 1 in doubles on 6 November 2023.

=== 2024: Fourth WTA 1000 title, Achilles injury ===
Ranked No. 180, she qualified and reached the third round for the first time at a major in singles at the Australian Open. Her performance ensured the deepest an Australian qualifier has progressed in an Australian Open women’s singles draw in 39 years. Her next singles tournament was the WTA 125 Mumbai Open where she reached the final but lost to Darja Semeņistaja in three sets.

At the Dubai Tennis Championships she won her fourth WTA 1000 doubles title with new partner Kateřina Siniaková. At Indian Wells, she reached the final with Siniaková but lost to top seeded pair Hsieh Su-wei and Elise Mertens. Partnering with Matthew Ebden at the same tournament, Hunter won the inaugural eight-team invitational mixed doubles title, defeating Caroline Garcia and Édouard Roger-Vasselin in the final. After qualifying for the main draw at the WTA 1000 Miami Open, she reached the second round for the third time at this tournament after Martina Trevisan had to retire.

Hunter ruptured her Achilles tendon in the final practice before Australia's Billie Jean King Cup qualifier against Mexico in Brisbane in April and underwent surgery.

=== 2025: Comeback, fifth WTA 1000 title ===
On 14 February 2025, Hunter announced she would return to the WTA Tour at the ATX Open in Austin, Texas, later that month, playing in the doubles event alongside Caroline Dolehide. The pair lost their first-round match against Alicja Rosolska and Isabelle Haverlag.

Partnering with Kateřina Siniaková, Hunter won her first title since making her comeback at the Wuhan Open in October, defeating Anna Danilina and her partner Aleksandra Krunić in the final. The following week she teamed with Desirae Krawczyk to reach the final at the Japan Women's Open, losing to Kristina Mladenovic and Taylor Townsend in a deciding champions tiebreak.

In November, she paired up with Monica Niculescu at the Chennai Open and made it through to the final, which they lost to Aldila Sutjiadi and Janice Tjen in straight sets.

=== 2026: 10th WTA Tour doubles title ===
Hunter qualified for the singles main-draw at the Australian Open and defeated Jéssica Bouzas Maneiro, before losing to Hailey Baptiste in the second round.

Partnering with Taylor Townsend, she won her 10th WTA Tour doubles title at the ATX Open, defeating Eudice Chong and Liang En-shuo in the final.

Teaming with fellow Australian player Marc Polmans, Hunter reached the mixed doubles final at Wimbledon, losing to second seeds Marcelo Arévalo and Jeļena Ostapenko in three sets.

Hunter qualified for the singles main-draw at the US Open, meaning she had achieved this feat at all four majors during her career. She lost to 11th seed Marta Kostyuk in the first round.

In October, Hunter and Kateřina Siniaková were runners-up at the Wuhan Open, losing in the final to top seeds Gabriela Dabrowski and Luisa Stefani. The following week she teamed with Janice Tjen to win the doubles title at the Japan Open, defeating Jesika Malečková and Miriam Škoch in the final.

== Personal life ==
Storm married Loughlin Hunter in November 2022 and took his surname.

== Performance timelines ==
Key
W	F	SF	QF	#R	RR	Q#	P#	DNQ	A	Z#	PO	G	S	B	NMS	NTI	P	NH

(W) winner; (F) finalist; (SF) semifinalist; (QF) quarterfinalist; (#R) rounds 4, 3, 2, 1; (RR) round-robin stage; (Q#) qualification round; (P#) preliminary round; (DNQ) did not qualify; (A) absent; (Z#) Davis/Fed Cup Zonal Group (with number indication) or (PO) play-off; (G) gold, (S) silver or (B) bronze Olympic/Paralympic medal; (NMS) not a Masters tournament; (NTI) not a Tier I tournament; (P) postponed; (NH) not held; (SR) strike rate (events won / competed); (W–L) win–loss record.
To avoid confusion and double counting, these charts are updated at the conclusion of a tournament or when the player's participation has ended.

=== Singles ===
Current through the 2026 Wimbledon Championships.

Tournament	2012	2013	2014	2015	2016	2017	2018	2019	2020	2021	2022	2023	2024	2025	2026	SR	W–L	Win%
Grand Slam tournaments
Australian Open	Q1	Q1	1R	1R	1R	Q1	A	A	Q2	Q1	1R	1R	3R	A	2R	0 / 7	3–7	30%
French Open	A	A	A	A	A	A	A	A	A	1R	Q1	2R	A	Q1	Q2	0 / 2	1–2	33%
Wimbledon	A	A	A	A	A	A	A	A	NH	Q3	Q2	1R	A	A	Q2	0 / 1	0–1	0%
US Open	A	Q1	A	A	A	A	A	A	A	1R	A	1R	A	Q1		0 / 2	0–2	0%
Win–loss	0–0	0–0	0–1	0–1	0–1	0–0	0–0	0–0	0–0	0–2	0–1	1–4	2–1	0–0	1–1	0 / 12	4–12	25%
National representation
Billie Jean King Cup	A	A	A	A	A	A	A	A	SF (Note: Edition was split into the two years due to COVID-19.)		F	RR	A	A		0 / 3	6–2	75%
WTA 1000 tournaments
Qatar Open	A	A	A	NT1	A	NT1	A	NT1	A	NT1	A	NT1	A	A	Q2	0 / 0	0–0	–
Dubai Championships	not tier 1000			A	NT1	A	NT1	A	NT1	A	NT1	A	1R	A	Q1	0 / 1	0–1	0%
Indian Wells Open	A	A	A	A	A	A	A	A	NH	A	A	A	Q2	A	2R	0 / 1	1–1	50%
Miami Open	A	A	A	A	A	A	A	A	NH	2R	2R	1R	2R	A	Q1	0 / 4	2–4	33%
Madrid Open	A	A	A	A	A	A	A	A	NH	A	A	A	A	A	A	0 / 0	0–0	–
Italian Open	A	A	A	A	A	A	A	A	A	A	Q1	A	A	Q1	A	0 / 0	0–0	–
Canadian Open	A	A	A	A	A	A	A	A	NH	A	1R	Q1	A	A		0 / 1	0–1	0%
Cincinnati Open	A	A	A	A	A	A	A	A	A	A	A	A	A	A		0 / 0	0–0	–
Guadalajara Open	not held										A	2R	NT1			0 / 1	1–1	50%
China Open	A	A	A	A	A	A	A	A	not held			A	A	Q1		0 / 0	0–0	–
Pan Pacific / Wuhan Open^{1}	A	A	A	A	A	A	A	A	not held				A	A		0 / 0	0–0	–
Win–loss	0–0	0–0	0–0	0–0	0–0	0–0	0–0	0–0	0–0	1–1	0–2	0–2	1–2	0–0	1–1	0 / 8	4–8	33%
Career statistics
	2012	2013	2014	2015	2016	2017	2018	2019	2020	2021	2022	2023	2024	2025	2026	SR	W–L	Win%
Tournaments	0	0	2	2	2	0	0	0	3	7	8	9	3	0	3	Career total: 40		
Titles	0	0	0	0	0	0	0	0	0	0	0	0	0	0	0	Career total: 0		
Finals	0	0	0	0	0	0	0	0	0	0	0	0	0	0	0	Career total: 0		
Overall win–loss^{2}	0–0	0–0	1–2	0–2	0–2	0–0	0–0	0–0	1–3	8–8	3–9	4–9	3–3	0–0	3–3	0 / 38	21–40	34%
Year–end ranking (Note: 2011: WTA ranking–725.)	721	242	323	371	293	676	–	428	282	129	237	172	194	507		$2,740,239		

=== Doubles ===
Current through the 2026 Wimbledon Championships.

Tournament	2012	2013	2014	2015	2016	2017	2018	2019	2020	2021	2022	2023	2024	2025	2026	SR	W–L	Win%
Grand Slam tournaments
Australian Open	1R	1R	1R	1R	2R	1R	1R	A	1R	2R	QF	QF	SF	A	3R	0 / 13	14–13	52%
French Open	A	A	A	A	A	A	A	1R	1R	2R	2R	3R	A	1R	2R	0 / 7	5–7	42%
Wimbledon	A	A	A	A	A	2R	A	1R	NH	SF	2R	F	A	A	3R	0 / 6	13–6	68%
US Open	A	A	A	A	A	A	A	A	1R	QF	SF	1R	A	2R		0 / 5	8–5	64%
Win–loss	0–1	0–1	0–1	0–1	1–1	1–2	0–1	0–2	0–3	9–4	9–4	10–4	4–1	0–1	5–3	0 / 31	40–31	56%
Year-end championships
WTA Finals	did not qualify				NH	did not qualify						SF	DNQ			0 / 1	3–1	75%
National representation
Summer Olympics	A	not held			A	not held				QF	not held		A	not held		0 / 1	3–1	75%
WTA 1000 tournaments
Qatar Open	A	not tier 1000			A	NT1	A	NT1	A	NT1	A	NT1	1R	A	QF	0 / 2	2–2	50%
Dubai Championships	NT1	A	A	A	NT1	A	NT1	A	NT1	A	NT1	A	W	A	QF	1 / 2	6–1	86%
Indian Wells Open	A	A	A	A	A	A	A	A	NH	A	QF	QF	F	1R	A	0 / 4	8–4	67%
Miami Open	A	A	A	A	A	A	A	A	NH	2R	A	QF	A	QF	QF	0 / 4	7–4	64%
Madrid Open	A	A	A	A	A	A	A	A	NH	A	SF	2R	A	2R	A	0 / 3	3–3	50%
Italian Open	A	A	A	A	A	A	A	A	1R	A	QF	W	A	SF	SF	1 / 4	12–4	75%
Canadian Open	A	A	A	A	A	A	A	1R	NH	A	QF	SF	A	A		0 / 3	5–3	63%
Cincinnati Open	A	A	A	A	A	A	A	A	QF	A	1R	SF	A	1R		0 / 4	4–4	50%
Guadalajara Open	not held										W	W	NT1			2 / 2	9–0	100%
China Open	A	A	A	A	A	A	A	1R	not held			2R	A	1R		0 / 3	0–3	0%
Pan Pacific / Wuhan Open^{1}	A	A	A	A	A	A	A	1R	not held				A	W	F	1 / 2	4–1	80%
Career statistics
Tournaments	1	2	2	3	2	7	4	15	12	11	15	11	5	5	10	Career total: 104		
Titles	0	0	0	0	0	1	0	0	1	0	3	2	1	0	1	Career total: 9		
Finals	0	0	0	0	0	3	0	0	2	2	3	5	1	0	1	Career total: 16		
Overall win–loss^{2}	0–1	0–2	0–2	0–3	2–2	11–6	0–4	6–15	13–11	21–12	31–13	37–14	15–4	19–15	20–9	9 / 104	146–96	60.33%
Year-end ranking	545	280	262	242	134	68	1036	109	65	30	10	1	31	33				

=== Mixed doubles ===
Current after the 2026 Wimbledon Championships.

Tournament	2014	2015	2016	2017	2018	2019	2020	2021	2022	2023	2024	2025	2026	SR	W–L
Grand Slam tournaments
Australian Open	1R	A	A	A	QF	A	1R	SF	1R	1R	2R	A	2R	0 / 8	7–8
French Open	A	A	A	A	A	A	NH	A	2R	2R	A	1R	1R	0 / 3	2–4
Wimbledon	A	A	A	A	A	A	NH	A	1R	1R	A	A	F	0 / 3	4–3
US Open	A	A	A	A	A	A	NH	1R	W	1R	A	A		1 / 3	5–2
Win–loss	0–1	0–0	0–0	0–0	2–1	0–0	0–1	3–2	6–3	1–4	1–1	0–1	5–3	1 / 18	18–17

Notes

- ^{1} In 2014, the Pan Pacific Open was downgraded to a Premier event and replaced by the Wuhan Open. The Premier 5 tournaments were reclassified as WTA 1000 tournaments in 2021.
- ^{2} Only main-draw results in WTA Tour, Grand Slam tournaments, Billie Jean King Cup, United Cup, Hopman Cup and Olympic Games are included in win–loss records.

== Grand Slam tournaments finals ==
=== Doubles: 1 (runner-up) ===
Result	Year	Tournament	Surface	Partner	Opponents	Score
Loss	2023	Wimbledon	Grass	(Belgium) Elise Mertens	(Chinese Taipei) Hsieh Su-wei (Czech Republic) Barbora Strýcová	5–7, 4–6

=== Mixed doubles: 2 (1 title, 1 runner-up) ===
Result	Year	Tournament	Surface	Partner	Opponents	Score
Win	2022	US Open	Hard	(Australia) John Peers	(Belgium) Kirsten Flipkens (France) Édouard Roger-Vasselin	4–6, 6–4, [10–7]
Loss	2026	Wimbledon	Grass	(Australia) Marc Polmans	(El Salvador) Marcelo Arévalo (Latvia) Jeļena Ostapenko	6–4, 5–7, 2–6

== WTA 1000 tournaments finals ==
=== Doubles: 7 (5 titles, 2 runner-ups) ===
Result	Year	Tournament	Surface	Partner	Opponents	Score
Win	2022	Guadalajara Open	Hard	(Brazil) Luisa Stefani	(Kazakhstan) Anna Danilina (Brazil) Beatriz Haddad Maia	7–6^{(7–4)}, 6–7^{(2–7)}, [10–8]
Win	2023	Italian Open	Clay	(Belgium) Elise Mertens	(United States) Coco Gauff (United States) Jessica Pegula	6–4, 6–4
Win	2023	Guadalajara Open	Hard	(Belgium) Elise Mertens	(Canada) Gabriela Dabrowski (New Zealand) Erin Routliffe	3–6, 6–2, [10–4]
Win	2024	Dubai Championships	Hard	(Czech Republic) Kateřina Siniaková	(United States) Nicole Melichar-Martinez (Australia) Ellen Perez	6–4, 6–2
Loss	2024	Indian Wells Open	Hard	(Czech Republic) Kateřina Siniaková	(Chinese Taipei) Hsieh Su-wei (Belgium) Elise Mertens	3–6, 4–6
Win	2025	Wuhan Open	Hard	(Czech Republic) Kateřina Siniaková	(Kazakhstan) Anna Danilina (Serbia) Aleksandra Krunić	6–3, 6–2
Loss	2026	Wuhan Open, China	Hard	(Czech Republic) Kateřina Siniaková	(Brazil) Luisa Stefani (Canada) Gabriela Dabrowski	5–7, 4–6

== WTA Tour finals ==
=== Doubles: 23 (11 titles, 12 runner-ups) ===
Legend Grand Slam (0–1) WTA 1000 (5–2) WTA 500 (2–1) WTA 250 (International) (4–8)	Finals by surface Hard (8–7) Clay (1–2) Grass (2–3)	Finals by setting Outdoor (23–0)

Result	W–L	Date	Tournament	Tier	Surface	Partner	Opponents	Score
Win	1–0	Jun 2017	Nottingham Open, UK	International	Grass	(Australia) Monique Adamczak	(United Kingdom) Jocelyn Rae (United Kingdom) Laura Robson	6–4, 4–6, [10–4]
Loss	1–1	Sep 2017	Japan Women's Open, Japan	International	Hard	(Australia) Monique Adamczak	(Japan) Shuko Aoyama (China) Yang Zhaoxuan	0–6, 6–2, [5–10]
Loss	1–2	Sep 2017	Guangzhou Open, China	International	Hard	(Australia) Monique Adamczak	(Belgium) Elise Mertens (Netherlands) Demi Schuurs	2–6, 3–6
Win	2–2	Feb 2020	Hua Hin Championships, Thailand	International	Hard	(Australia) Arina Rodionova	(Austria) Barbara Haas (Australia) Ellen Perez	6–3, 6–3
Loss	2–3	Sep 2020	İstanbul Cup, Turkey	International	Clay	(Australia) Ellen Perez	(Chile) Alexa Guarachi (United States) Desirae Krawczyk	1–6, 3–6
Loss	2–4	Apr 2021	Charleston International, US	WTA 250	Clay	(Australia) Ellen Perez	(United States) Hailey Baptiste (United States) Caty McNally	7–6^{(7–4)}, 4–6, [6–10]
Loss	2–5	Jun 2021	Nottingham Open, UK	WTA 250	Grass	(United States) Caroline Dolehide	(Ukraine) Lyudmyla Kichenok (Japan) Makoto Ninomiya	4–6, 7–6^{(7–3)}, [8–10]
Win	3–5	Jan 2022	Adelaide International, Australia	WTA 500	Hard	(Australia) Ashleigh Barty	(Croatia) Darija Jurak Schreiber (Slovenia) Andreja Klepač	6–1, 6–4
Win	4–5	Jun 2022	Berlin Open, Germany	WTA 500	Grass	(Czech Republic) Kateřina Siniaková	(France) Alizé Cornet (Switzerland) Jil Teichmann	6–4, 6–3
Win	5–5	Oct 2022	Guadalajara Open, Mexico	WTA 1000	Hard	(Brazil) Luisa Stefani	(Kazakhstan) Anna Danilina (Brazil) Beatriz Haddad Maia	7–6^{(7–4)}, 6–7^{(2–7)}, [10–8]
Loss	5–6	Jan 2023	Adelaide International, Australia	WTA 500	Hard	(Czech Republic) Kateřina Siniaková	(United States) Asia Muhammad (United States) Taylor Townsend	2–6, 6–7^{(2–7)}
Win	6–6	May 2023	Italian Open, Italy	WTA 1000	Clay	(Belgium) Elise Mertens	(United States) Coco Gauff (United States) Jessica Pegula	6–4, 6–4
Loss	6–7	Jun 2023	Birmingham Classic, UK	WTA 250	Grass	(United States) Alycia Parks	(Ukraine) Marta Kostyuk (Czech Republic) Barbora Krejčiková	2–6, 6–7^{(7–9)}
Loss	6–8	Jul 2023	Wimbledon, UK	Grand Slam	Grass	(Belgium) Elise Mertens	(Chinese Taipei) Hsieh Su-wei (Czech Republic) Barbora Strýcová	5–7, 4–6
Win	7–8	Sep 2023	Guadalajara Open, Mexico (2)	WTA 1000	Hard	(Belgium) Elise Mertens	(Canada) Gabriela Dabrowski (New Zealand) Erin Routliffe	3–6, 6–2, [10–4]
Win	8–8	Feb 2024	Dubai Championships, UAE	WTA 1000	Hard	(Czech Republic) Kateřina Siniaková	(United States) Nicole Melichar-Martinez (Australia) Ellen Perez	6–4, 6–2
Loss	8–9	Mar 2024	Indian Wells Open, US	WTA 1000	Hard	(Czech Republic) Kateřina Siniaková	(Chinese Taipei) Hsieh Su-wei (Belgium) Elise Mertens	3–6, 4–6
Win	9–9	Oct 2025	Wuhan Open, China	WTA 1000	Hard	(Czech Republic) Kateřina Siniaková	(Kazakhstan) Anna Danilina (Serbia) Aleksandra Krunić	6–3, 6–2
Loss	9–10	Oct 2025	Japan Women's Open, Japan	WTA 250	Hard	(United States) Desirae Krawczyk	(France) Kristina Mladenovic (United States) Taylor Townsend	4–6, 6–2, [5–10]
Loss	9–11	Nov 2025	Chennai Open, India	WTA 250	Hard	(Romania) Monica Niculescu	(Indonesia) Aldila Sutjiadi (Indonesia) Janice Tjen	5–7, 4–6
Win	10–11	Feb 2026	ATX Open, US	WTA 250	Hard	(United States) Taylor Townsend	(Hong Kong) Eudice Chong (Chinese Taipei) Liang En-shuo	6–3, 6–4
Loss	10–12	Oct 2026	Wuhan Open, China	WTA 1000	Hard	(Czech Republic) Kateřina Siniaková	(Brazil) Luisa Stefani (Canada) Gabriela Dabrowski	5–7, 4–6
Win	11–12	Oct 2026	Japan Women's Open, Japan	WTA 250	Hard	(Indonesia) Janice Tjen	(Czech Republic) Jesika Malečková (Czech Republic) Miriam Škoch	6–4, 6–1

== WTA Challenger finals ==
=== Singles: 1 (runner-up) ===
Result	W–L	Date	Tournament	Surface	Opponent	Score
Loss	0–1	Feb 2024	WTA 125 Mumbai, India	Hard	(Latvia) Darja Semeņistaja	7–5, 6–7^{(6–8)}, 2–6

=== Doubles: 1 (title) ===
Result	W–L	Date	Tournament	Surface	Partner	Opponents	Score
Win	1–0	May 2023	WTA 125 Reus, Spain	Clay	(Australia) Ellen Perez	(Chile) Alexa Guarachi (New Zealand) Erin Routliffe	6–1, 7–6^{(10–8)}

== ITF Circuit finals ==
=== Singles: 5 (3 titles, 2 runner–ups) ===
Legend W60 tournaments (2–0) 25K tournaments (1–1) 15K tournaments (0–1)	Finals by surface Hard (3–2)

Result	W–L	Date	Tournament	Tier	Surface	Opponent	Score
Win	1–0	Feb 2013	ITF Launceston, Australia	25K	Hard	(Japan) Shuko Aoyama	6–4, 6–4
Loss	1–1	Mar 2013	ITF Ipswich, Australia	25K	Hard	(Croatia) Jelena Pandžić	5–7, 6–2, 2–6
Loss	1–2	Sep 2015	ITF Tweed Heads, Australia	15K	Hard	(Hungary) Dalma Gálfi	2–6, 6–3, 1–6
Win	2–2	Nov 2019	ITF Playford, Australia	W60	Hard	(Australia) Lizette Cabrera	6–3, 6–4
Win	3–2	Feb 2023	ITF Burnie, Australia	W60	Hard	(Australia) Olivia Gadecki	6–4, 6–3

=== Doubles: 22 (13 titles, 9 runner–ups) ===
Legend W100 (100K) tournaments (2–1) W60 (50K) tournaments (8–1) W25 (25K) tournaments (3–5) 10K tournaments (0–2)	Finals by surface Hard (8–6) Clay (4–0) Grass (1–3)

Result	W–L	Date	Tournament	Tier	Surface	Partner	Opponents	Score
Loss	0–1	May 2011	ITF Landisville, United States	10K	Hard	(Australia) Brooke Rischbieth	(United States) Hsu Chieh-yu (United Kingdom) Nicola Slater	5–7, 3–6
Loss	0–2	May 2011	ITF Sumter, United States	10K	Hard	(Australia) Ebony Panoho	(Australia) Bojana Bobusic (United Kingdom) Nicola Slater	6–4, 5–7, [6–10]
Loss	0–3	Sep 2011	ITF Alice Springs, Australia	25K	Hard	(Australia) Brooke Rischbieth	(Brazil) Maria Fernanda Alves (United Kingdom) Samantha Murray	6–3, 5–7, [3–10]
Loss	0–4	Nov 2011	ITF Bendigo, Australia	25K	Hard	(United Kingdom) Samantha Murray	(Australia) Stephanie Bengson (Australia) Tyra Calderwood	6–2, 1–6, [5–10]
Loss	0–5	Mar 2013	ITF Ipswich, Australia	25K	Hard	(Australia) Viktorija Rajicic	(Thailand) Noppawan Lertcheewakarn (Thailand) Varatchaya Wongteanchai	6–4, 1–6, [8–10]
Win	1–5	Jul 2013	ITF Sacramento, United States	50K	Hard	(United Kingdom) Naomi Broady	(United States) Robin Anderson (United States) Lauren Embree	6–3, 6–4
Win	2–5	Jan 2014	ITF Burnie, Australia	50K	Hard	(Australia) Jarmila Gajdošová	(Japan) Eri Hozumi (Japan) Miki Miyamura	6–4, 6–4
Win	3–5	Jul 2014	ITF Sacramento, United States (2)	50K	Hard	(Russia) Daria Gavrilova	(United States) Maria Sanchez (United States) Zoë Gwen Scandalis	6–2, 6–1
Loss	3–6	Jun 2015	ITF Baton Rouge, United States	25K	Hard	(South Africa) Chanel Simmonds	(United States) Samantha Crawford (United States) Emily Harman	6–7^{(4)}, 1–6
Win	4–6	Jul 2015	ITF Granby, Canada	50K	Hard	(Australia) Jessica Moore	(United Kingdom) Laura Robson (Canada) Erin Routliffe	7–5, 6–2
Win	5–6	Oct 2015	ITF Cairns, Australia	25K	Hard	(Australia) Jessica Moore	(United States) Jennifer Elie (United States) Asia Muhammad	6–0, 6–3
Loss	5–7	Jun 2016	ITF Ilkley, United Kingdom	50K	Grass	(Belgium) An-Sophie Mestach	(China) Yang Zhaoxuan (China) Zhang Kailin	3–6, 6–7^{(5)}
Win	6–7	Oct 2016	ITF Canberra, Australia	50K	Hard	(Australia) Jessica Moore	(Australia) Alison Bai (Australia) Lizette Cabrera	6–3, 6–4
Win	7–7	May 2017	ITF Wiesbaden, Germany	25K	Clay	(Germany) Vivian Heisen	(Latvia) Diāna Marcinkēviča (Switzerland) Rebeka Masarova	7–5, 5–7, [10–8]
Win	8–7	Jun 2017	ITF Surbiton, United Kingdom	100K	Grass	(Australia) Monique Adamczak	(Chinese Taipei) Chang Kai-chen (New Zealand) Marina Erakovic	7–5, 6–4
Loss	8–8	Mar 2019	ITF Mildura, Australia	W25	Grass	(Australia) Olivia Rogowska	(Australia) Alana Parnaby (Australia) Alicia Smith	6–4, 3–6, [8–10]
Win	9–8	May 2019	ITF Rome, Italy	W25	Clay	(Australia) Arina Rodionova	(Brazil) Gabriela Cé (Romania) Cristina Dinu	6–2, 6–3
Win	10–8	May 2019	ITF La Bisbal d'Empordà, Spain	W60	Clay	(Australia) Arina Rodionova	(Hungary) Dalma Galfi (Spain) Georgina Garcia-Perez	6–4, 6–4
Win	11–8	Nov 2019	ITF Playford, Australia	W60	Hard	(United States) Asia Muhammad	(United Kingdom) Naiktha Bains (Slovakia) Tereza Mihalíková	6–3, 6–4
Win	12–8	Jan 2020	ITF Burnie, Australia (2)	W60	Hard	(Australia) Ellen Perez	(United States) Desirae Krawczyk (United States) Asia Muhammad	6–3, 6–2
Win	13–8	May 2021	ITF Charleston, United States	W100	Clay	(United States) Caty McNally	(Japan) Eri Hozumi (Japan) Miyu Kato	7–5, 4–6, [10–6]
Loss	13–9	Jun 2021	ITF Nottingham, United Kingdom	W100	Grass	(Australia) Priscilla Hon	(Romania) Monica Niculescu (Romania) Elena-Gabriela Ruse	5–7, 5–7
