= Alexandra Bozovic =

Australian tennis player

- Country (sports): Australia
- Born: 15 February 1999 (age 27)
- Plays: Right (two-handed backhand)
- Prize money: $208,758

Singles
- Career record: 196–168
- Career titles: 2 ITF
- Highest ranking: No. 283 (12 June 2023)

Grand Slam singles results
- Australian Open: Q1 (2019, 2021, 2022, 2023)

Doubles
- Career record: 127–117
- Career titles: 10 ITF
- Highest ranking: No. 157 (17 July 2023)

Grand Slam doubles results
- Australian Open: 1R (2022, 2023)
- Last updated on: 2 June 2026.

Alexandra Bozovic (born 15 February 1999) is an inactive Australian tennis player.

Bozovic has a career-high singles ranking by the Women's Tennis Association (WTA) of 283, achieved on 12 June 2023, and a best doubles ranking of 157, attained on 17 July 2023.

== Career ==
Bozovic made her major main-draw debut, after winning the 2020 Australian Open Wildcard Playoff, granting her a wildcard into the 2020 Australian Open women's doubles event alongside Amber Marshall.

In January 2022, Bozovic lost in the first round of the Australian Open qualifying.

== ITF Circuit finals ==
=== Singles: 5 (2 titles, 3 runner-ups) ===
Legend
W25 tournaments

Result	W–L	Date	Tournament	Tier	Surface	Opponent	Score
Loss	0–1	Jan 2018	Playford International, Australia	25,000	Hard	(Australia) Zoe Hives	4–6, 7–5, 6–7^{(4)}
Loss	0–2	Jun 2018	ITF Hua Hin, Thailand	25,000	Hard	(Israel) Julia Glushko	2–6, 2–6
Loss	0–3	Jul 2022	ITF Guimarães, Portugal	W25	Hard	(Spain) Rosa Vicens Mas	4–6, 1–6
Win	1–3	Sep 2022	ITF Darwin, Australia	W25	Hard	(Australia) Destanee Aiava	6–1, 6–4
Win	2–3	Sep 2022	ITF Darwin, Australia	W25	Hard	(Australia) Talia Gibson	3–6, 6–3, 6–3

=== Doubles: 17 (10 titles, 7 runner-ups) ===
Legend
W60/75 tournaments
W25/35 tournaments
W10/15 tournaments

Result	W–L	Date	Tournament	Tier	Surface	Partner	Opponents	Score
Loss	0–1	Jul 2016	ITF Hong Kong, China SAR	10,000	Hard	(Australia) Kaylah McPhee	(Hong Kong) Eudice Chong (Hong Kong) Katherine Ip	2–6, 2–6
Loss	0–2	Mar 2018	ITF Mildura, Australia	25,000	Grass	(Australia) Olivia Tjandramulia	(United Kingdom) Katy Dunne (United Kingdom) Gabriella Taylor	7–5, 6–7^{(4)}, [5–10]
Loss	0–3	Feb 2019	Launceston International, Australia	W60	Hard	(Australia) Isabelle Wallace	(Chinese Taipei) Chang Kai-chen (Chinese Taipei) Hsu Ching-wen	2–6, 4–6
Loss	0–4	Aug 2019	ITF El Espinar, Spain	W25	Hard	(Belarus) Shalimar Talbi	(Spain) Marina Bassols Ribera (China) Feng Shuo	5–7, 6–7^{(4)}
Loss	0–5	Mar 2022	Bendigo International, Australia	W25	Hard	(Poland) Weronika Falkowska	(India) Rutuja Bhosale (India) Ankita Raina	6–4, 3–6, [4–10]
Win	1–5	Jul 2022	ITF Figueira da Foz, Portugal	W25+H	Hard	(Portugal) Francisca Jorge	(Chinese Taipei) Lee Pei-chi (Chinese Taipei) Wu Fang-hsien	6–2, 3–6, [12–10]
Win	2–5	Oct 2022	ITF Cairns, Australia	W25	Hard	(United Kingdom) Naiktha Bains	(Australia) Destanee Aiava (Australia) Lisa Mays	6–4, 6–4
Win	3–5	Oct 2022	Playford International, Australia	W60	Hard	(Australia) Talia Gibson	(Indonesia) Priska Madelyn Nugroho (South Korea) Han Na-lae	7–5, 6–4
Win	4–5	Mar 2023	ITF Swan Hill, Australia	W25	Grass	(Australia) Elysia Bolton	(Australia) Olivia Gadecki (Australia) Petra Hule	7–6^{(3)}, 2–6, [10–7]
Win	5–5	Mar 2023	Clay Court International, Australia	W60	Clay	(Australia) Elysia Bolton	(Australia) Priscilla Hon (Slovenia) Dalila Jakupović	4–6, 7–5, [13–11]
Win	6–5	Apr 2023	ITF Osaka, Japan	W25	Hard	(Australia) Petra Hule	(Chinese Taipei) Lee Pei-chi (Chinese Taipei) Lee Ya-hsuan	6–2, 6–3
Win	7–5	Jun 2023	ITF Setúbal, Portugal	W25	Hard	(Australia) Elysia Bolton	(Australia) Gabriella Da Silva-Fick (Australia) Petra Hule	6–7^{(6)}, 7–6^{(3)}, [10–8]
Win	8–5	Aug 2023	ITF Valladolid, Spain	W25	Hard	(United Kingdom) Sarah Beth Grey	(United States) Ava Markham (China) Tian Fangran	7–5, 6–0
Loss	8–6	Sep 2023	Berkeley Challenge, United States	W60	Hard	(Australia) Elysia Bolton	(United States) Jessie Aney (Colombia) María Herazo González	5–7, 5–7
Win	9–6	May 2024	ITF Santo Domingo, Dominican Republic	W35	Hard	(Hong Kong) Cody Wong	(Mexico) Jéssica Hinojosa Gómez (Ecuador) Mell Reasco	6–7^{(5)}, 7–5, [11–9]
Loss	9–7	Oct 2024	ITF Cairns, Australia	W35	Hard	(Australia) Destanee Aiava	(Australia) Petra Hule (Australia) Alana Parnaby	6–3, 2–6, [2–10]
Win	10–7	Oct 2024	Playford International, Australia	W75	Hard	(Australia) Petra Hule	(Australia) Lizette Cabrera (Australia) Taylah Preston	6–4, 6–3
