= 2017 Barcelona Women World Winner =

- Date: 12–18 June
- Edition: 3rd
- Category: ITF Women's Circuit
- Prize money: $60,000
- Surface: Clay
- Location: Barcelona, Spain

Champions

Singles
- (Chile) Daniela Seguel

Doubles
- (Paraguay) Montserrat González / (Spain) Sílvia Soler Espinosa
- Barcelona Women World Winner

The 2017 Barcelona Women World Winner was a professional tennis tournament played on outdoor clay courts. It was the third edition of the tournament and part of the 2017 ITF Women's Circuit, offering a total of $60,000 in prize money. It took place in Barcelona, Spain, from 12–18 June 2017.

== Point distribution ==
Event	W	F	SF	QF	Round of 16	Round of 32	Q	Q2	Q3
Singles	80	48	29	15	8	1	5	3	1
Doubles	80	48	29	15	1	—N/a	—N/a	—N/a	—N/a

== Singles main draw entrants ==
=== Seeds ===
Country	Player	Rank^{1}	Seed
CZE	Denisa Allertová	104	1
SLO	Dalila Jakupović	130	2
ESP	Sílvia Soler Espinosa	147	3
SUI	Jil Teichmann	152	4
JPN	Misa Eguchi	166	5
PAR	Montserrat González	190	6
~~CZE~~	~~Marie Bouzková~~	~~201~~	~~7~~
FRA	Myrtille Georges	204	8
SUI	Conny Perrin	206	9

- ^{1} Rankings as of 29 May 2017

=== Other entrants ===
The following players received wildcards into the singles main draw:

- (Spain) Paula Badosa Gibert
- (Sweden) Mirjam Björklund
- (Spain) Cristina Bucșa
- (Spain) María Teresa Torró Flor

The following player received entry by a special exempt:

- (Venezuela) Andrea Gámiz

The following players received entry from the qualifying draw:

- (Spain) Irene Burillo Escorihuela
- (Croatia) Tena Lukas
- (Russia) Marta Paigina
- (Mexico) Renata Zarazúa

The following players received entry as lucky losers:

- (France) Manon Arcangioli
- (Australia) Isabelle Wallace

== Champions ==
=== Singles ===
- (Chile) Daniela Seguel def. (France) Amandine Hesse, 3–6, 7–6^{(7–5)}, 7–6^{(7–3)}

=== Doubles ===
- (Paraguay) Montserrat González / (Spain) Sílvia Soler Espinosa def. (Israel) Julia Glushko / (Australia) Priscilla Hon, 6–4, 6–3
