= 2023 Brisbane QTC Tennis International =

Tennis tournament

- Date: 20–26 November 2023
- Edition: 6th
- Category: ITF Men's World Tennis Tour; ITF Women's World Tennis Tour
- Prize money: $25,000 $60,000
- Surface: Hard / Outdoor
- Location: Brisbane, Australia

Champions

Men's singles
- (Japan) Shintaro Imai

Women's singles
- (Australia) Taylah Preston

Men's doubles
- (Australia) Thomas Fancutt / (New Zealand) Ajeet Rai

Women's doubles
- (Australia) Talia Gibson / (Australia) Priscilla Hon
- Brisbane QTC Tennis International

The 2023 Brisbane QTC Tennis International is a professional tennis tournament played on outdoor hardcourts. It is the sixth edition of the tournament which is part of the 2023 ITF Men's World Tennis Tour and 2023 ITF Women's World Tennis Tour. It took place in Brisbane, Australia between 20 and 26 November 2023.

== Champions ==
=== Men's singles ===
- (Japan) Shintaro Imai def. (Australia) Blake Ellis 6–4, 7–6^{(7–3)}

=== Women's singles ===
- (Australia) Taylah Preston def. Darya Astakhova 6–3, 6–4.

=== Men's doubles ===
- (Australia) Thomas Fancutt / (New Zealand) Ajeet Rai def. (Australia) Joshua Charlton / (United Kingdom) Emile Hudd 6–4, 6–4.

=== Women's doubles ===
- (Australia) Talia Gibson / (Australia) Priscilla Hon def. (Australia) Destanee Aiava / (Australia) Maddison Inglis 4–6, 7–5, [10–5].

== Men's singles main draw entrants ==
=== Seeds ===
Country	Player	Rank^{1}	Seed
POR	Gonçalo Oliveira	234	1
~~AUS~~	~~Tristan Schoolkate~~	~~250~~	~~2~~
AUS	Blake Ellis	387	3
USA	Nick Chappell	392	4
AUS	Blake Mott	400	5
NZL	Ajeet Rai	456	6
AUS	Thomas Fancutt	495	7
AUS	Jake Delaney	498	8

- ^{1} Rankings are as of 13 November 2023.

=== Other entrants ===
The following players received wildcards into the singles main draw:

- (Australia) Hayden Jones
- (Australia) Zachary Viiala
- (Australia) Nikita Volonski

The following players received entry into the singles main draw using a protected ranking:

- (Japan) Shintaro Imai
- (Japan) Jumpei Yamasaki

The following players received entry from the qualifying draw:

- (Australia) Blake Bayldon
- (Australia) Joshua Charlton
- (United Kingdom) Emile Hudd
- (Australia) Matt Hulme
- (Australia) Scott Jones
- (Australia) Mason Naumovski
- (Australia) Tomislav Edward Papac
- (Australia) Tai Sach

The following player received entry as a lucky loser:

- (New Zealand) Alexander Klintcharov

== Women's singles main draw entrants ==
=== Seeds ===
Country	Player	Rank^{1}	Seed
AUS	Olivia Gadecki	134	1
AUS	Destanee Aiava	187	2
IND	Ankita Raina	201	3
AUS	Jaimee Fourlis	203	4
AUS	Daria Saville	205	5
AUS	Priscilla Hon	209	6
	Darya Astakhova	210	7
AUS	Seone Mendez	242	8

- ^{1} Rankings are as of 13 November 2023.

=== Other entrants ===
The following players received wildcards into the singles main draw:

- (Australia) Gabriella Da Silva-Fick
- (Australia) Maya Joint
- (Australia) Alana Parnaby
- (Australia) Ivana Popovic

The following players received entry from the qualifying draw:

- (Czech Republic) Michaela Bayerlová
- (Australia) Melisa Ercan
- (China) Liu Fangzhou
- (United States) Lea Ma
- (Australia) Elena Micic
- (Japan) Mio Mushika
- (Japan) Hikaru Sato
- (China) Shi Han
