= 2019 Trofeu Internacional Ciutat de Barcelona – Singles =

Singles
- 2019 Trofeu Internacional Ciutat de Barcelona

Final
- Champion: (United States) Allie Kiick
- Runner-up: (Turkey) Çağla Büyükakçay
- Score: 7–6^{(7–3)}, 3–6, 6–1

Events
Singles	Doubles
← 2018 ·	Trofeu Internacional Ciutat de Barcelona	· 2020 →

Estrella Cabeza Candela was the defending champion, but chose not to participate.

Allie Kiick won the title, defeating Çağla Büyükakçay in the final, 7–6^{(7–3)}, 3–6, 6–1.

== Seeds ==
1. (United States) Allie Kiick (champion)
2. (China) Han Xinyun (quarterfinals)
3. (Romania) Irina Bara (quarterfinals)
4. (Netherlands) Richèl Hogenkamp (semifinals)
5. (Montenegro) Danka Kovinić (first round)
6. (Australia) Zoe Hives (withdrew)
7. (Croatia) Tereza Mrdeža (first round)
8. (Belgium) Kimberley Zimmermann (first round)

== Draw ==
=== Key ===
- Q = Qualifier
- WC = Wild card
- LL = Lucky loser
- Alt = Alternate
- SE = Special exempt
- PR = Protected ranking
- ITF = ITF entry
- JE = Junior exempt
- w/o = Walkover
- r = Retired
- d = Defaulted
- SR = Special ranking

=== Finals ===
Semifinals
1	(United States) Allie Kiick	6	7
4	(Netherlands) Richèl Hogenkamp	3	5
(Turkey) Çağla Büyükakçay	6	6
Q	(Australia) Jaimee Fourlis	0	0

Final
1	(United States) Allie Kiick	7^{7}	3	6
(Turkey) Çağla Büyükakçay	6^{3}	6	1

=== Top half ===
First round
1	(United States) A Kiick	6	7
WC	(Spain) E Guerrero Álvarez	3	5
Q	(Australia) A Bai	3	0
WC	(Spain) C Bucșa	6	6
Q	(France) M Arcangioli	6	1	6^{6}
Q	(France) M Yerolymos	4	6	7^{8}
(Serbia) N Stojanović	6	7
8	(Belgium) K Zimmermann	3	5
4	(Netherlands) R Hogenkamp	6	6
(Spain) O Sáez Larra	1	1
(France) A Hesse	6	6
(Japan) K Nara	2	3
WC	(Spain) G Maristany	3	7^{7}	0
(Mexico) R Zarazúa	6	6^{2}	6
Q	(Spain) I Burillo Escorihuela	7	6
7	(Croatia) T Mrdeža	5	2

Second round
1	(United States) A Kiick	6	7
WC	(Spain) C Bucșa	3	5
Q	(France) M Yerolymos	4	6	1
(Serbia) N Stojanović	6	2	6
4	(Netherlands) R Hogenkamp	6	6
(France) A Hesse	1	3
(Mexico) R Zarazúa	4	5
Q	(Spain) I Burillo Escorihuela	6	7

Quarterfinals
1	(United States) A Kiick	6	6
(Serbia) N Stojanović	2	2
4	(Netherlands) R Hogenkamp	6	6
Q	(Spain) I Burillo Escorihuela	2	3

Semifinals
1	(United States) A Kiick	6	7
4	(Netherlands) R Hogenkamp	3	5

=== Bottom half ===
First round
5	(Montenegro) D Kovinić	3	0
(Turkey) Ç Büyükakçay	6	6
(Germany) K Hobgarski	6	7^{10}
(Serbia) D Radanović	2	6^{8}
(Chile) D Seguel	6	6^{4}	6
(Russia) V Gracheva	4	7^{7}	3
(Belgium) M Benoît	6	2	3
3	(Romania) I Bara	3	6	6
Q	(Australia) J Fourlis	6	6
(Hungary) RL Jani	3	3
Q	(Greece) D Papamichail	4	6	4
Q	(Spain) M Bassols Ribera	6	4	6
WC	(Spain) C Martínez Círez	3	2
LL	(Slovakia) V Juhászová	6	6
Q	(Venezuela) A Gámiz	4	6^{4}
2	(China) X Han	6	7^{7}

Second round
(Turkey) Ç Büyükakçay	6	6
(Germany) K Hobgarski	1	4
(Chile) D Seguel	5	6	3
3	(Romania) I Bara	7	3	6
Q	(Australia) J Fourlis	2	6	7
Q	(Spain) M Bassols Ribera	6	2	5
LL	(Slovakia) V Juhászová	3	3
2	(China) X Han	6	6

Quarterfinals
(Turkey) Ç Büyükakçay	7	6
3	(Romania) I Bara	5	4
Q	(Australia) J Fourlis	6	6
2	(China) X Han	2	1

Semifinals
(Turkey) Ç Büyükakçay	6	6
Q	(Australia) J Fourlis	0	0
