= 2019 Trofeu Internacional Ciutat de Barcelona – Doubles =

Doubles
- 2019 Trofeu Internacional Ciutat de Barcelona

Final
- Champions: (Japan) Kyōka Okamura (Japan) Moyuka Uchijima
- Runners-up: (Spain) Marina Bassols Ribera (Spain) Yvonne Cavallé Reimers
- Score: 7–6^{(9–7)}, 6–4

Events
Singles	Doubles
← 2018 ·	Trofeu Internacional Ciutat de Barcelona	· 2020 →

Jessica Ho and Wang Xiyu were the defending champions, but chose not to participate.

Kyōka Okamura and Moyuka Uchijima won the title, defeating Marina Bassols Ribera and Yvonne Cavallé Reimers in the final, 7–6^{(9–7)}, 6–4.

== Seeds ==
1. (Montenegro) Danka Kovinić / (Brazil) Laura Pigossi (first round)
2. (Australia) Alison Bai / (Serbia) Nina Stojanović (quarterfinals)
3. (Germany) Katharina Hobgarski / (Germany) Julia Wachaczyk (first round)
4. (Spain) Cristina Bucșa / (France) Marine Partaud (first round)

== Draw ==
=== Key ===
- Q = Qualifier
- WC = Wild card
- LL = Lucky loser
- Alt = Alternate
- SE = Special exempt
- PR = Protected ranking
- ITF = ITF entry
- JE = Junior exempt
- w/o = Walkover
- r = Retired
- d = Defaulted
- SR = Special ranking

=== Draw ===
First round
1	(Montenegro) D Kovinić (Brazil) L Pigossi	6^{6}	2
(Spain) R Masarova (Mexico) R Zarazúa	7^{8}	6
(Spain) I Burillo Escorihuela (Spain) A Lázaro García	6	7
(France) A Hesse (Croatia) T Mrdeža	4	5
4	(Spain) C Bucșa (France) M Partaud	6^{10}	6^{2}
(Spain) E Guerrero Álvarez (Spain) G Maristany	7^{12}	7^{7}
(Spain) M Bassols Ribera (Spain) Y Cavallé Reimers	6	6
WC	(Spain) A Briones Ginesta (Spain) L Santos Sánchez	1	3
WC	(Spain) F Arrese Mata (Spain) E López Alcaraz	6	6
WC	(Spain) A Alegre (Spain) A Teixidó Garcia	1	1
(Japan) K Okamura (Japan) M Uchijima	6	6
3	(Germany) K Hobgarski (Germany) J Wachaczyk	1	3
(Venezuela) A Gámiz (Chile) D Seguel	6	6
(France) M Arcangioli (France) M Yerolymos	1	3
(Turkey) Ç Büyükakçay (Greece) D Papamichail	5	6	[5]
2	(Australia) A Bai (Serbia) N Stojanović	7	4	[10]

Quarterfinals
(Spain) R Masarova (Mexico) R Zarazúa	6	2	[6]
(Spain) I Burillo Escorihuela (Spain) A Lázaro García	2	6	[10]
(Spain) E Guerrero Álvarez (Spain) G Maristany	3	2
(Spain) M Bassols Ribera (Spain) Y Cavallé Reimers	6	6
WC	(Spain) F Arrese Mata (Spain) E López Alcaraz	2	2
(Japan) K Okamura (Japan) M Uchijima	6	6
(Venezuela) A Gámiz (Chile) D Seguel	7	7^{7}
2	(Australia) A Bai (Serbia) N Stojanović	5	6^{4}

Semifinals
(Spain) I Burillo Escorihuela (Spain) A Lázaro García	5	6	[10]
(Spain) M Bassols Ribera (Spain) Y Cavallé Reimers	7	3	[12]
(Japan) K Okamura (Japan) M Uchijima	6^{1}	6	[10]
(Venezuela) A Gámiz (Chile) D Seguel	7^{7}	1	[5]

Final
(Spain) M Bassols Ribera (Spain) Y Cavallé Reimers	6^{7}	4
(Japan) K Okamura (Japan) M Uchijima	7^{9}	6
