= 2019 Trofeu Internacional Ciutat de Barcelona =

- Date: 10–16 June 2019
- Edition: 5th
- Category: ITF Women's World Tennis Tour
- Prize money: $60,000
- Surface: Clay
- Location: Barcelona, Spain

Champions

Singles
- (United States) Allie Kiick

Doubles
- (Japan) Kyōka Okamura / (Japan) Moyuka Uchijima
← 2018 ·	Trofeu Internacional Ciutat de Barcelona	· 2020 →

The 2019 Trofeu Internacional Ciutat de Barcelona was a professional tennis tournament played on outdoor clay courts. It was the fifth edition of the tournament which was part of the 2019 ITF Women's World Tennis Tour. It took place in Barcelona, Spain between 10 and 16 June 2019.

== Singles main-draw entrants ==
=== Seeds ===
Country	Player	Rank^{1}	Seed
USA	Allie Kiick	150	1
CHN	Han Xinyun	160	2
ROU	Irina Bara	165	3
NED	Richèl Hogenkamp	177	4
MNE	Danka Kovinić	182	5
~~AUS~~	~~Zoe Hives~~	~~197~~	~~6~~
CRO	Tereza Mrdeža	199	7
BEL	Kimberley Zimmermann	215	8

- ^{1} Rankings are as of 27 May 2019.

=== Other entrants ===
The following players received wildcards into the singles main draw:

- (Spain) Cristina Bucșa
- (Spain) Eva Guerrero Álvarez
- (Spain) Guiomar Maristany
- (Spain) Carlota Martínez Círez

The following players received entry from the qualifying draw:

- (France) Manon Arcangioli
- (Australia) Alison Bai
- (Spain) Marina Bassols Ribera
- (Spain) Irene Burillo Escorihuela
- (Australia) Jaimee Fourlis
- (Venezuela) Andrea Gámiz
- (Greece) Despina Papamichail
- (France) Margot Yerolymos

The following players received entry as a lucky loser:

- (Slovakia) Vivien Juhászová

== Champions ==
=== Singles ===
- (United States) Allie Kiick def. (Turkey) Çağla Büyükakçay, 7–6^{(7–3)}, 3–6, 6–1

=== Doubles ===
- (Japan) Kyōka Okamura / (Japan) Moyuka Uchijima def. (Spain) Marina Bassols Ribera / (Spain) Yvonne Cavallé Reimers, 7–6^{(9–7)}, 6–4
