= 2023 Brisbane QTC Tennis International – Women's singles =

Women's singles
- 2023 Brisbane QTC Tennis International

Final
- Champion: (Australia) Taylah Preston
- Runner-up: Darya Astakhova
- Score: 6–3, 6–4

Events
Singles	men	women
Doubles	men	women
- Brisbane QTC Tennis International

Asia Muhammad was the reigning champion from when the tournament was last held in 2019, but chose not to compete this year.

Taylah Preston won the title, defeating Darya Astakhova in the final, 6–3, 6–4.

== Seeds ==
1. (Australia) Olivia Gadecki (first round)
2. (Australia) Destanee Aiava (quarterfinals)
3. (India) Ankita Raina (first round)
4. (Australia) Jaimee Fourlis (second round)
5. (Australia) Daria Saville (first round)
6. (Australia) Priscilla Hon (quarterfinals)
7. Darya Astakhova (final)
8. (Australia) Seone Mendez (quarterfinals)

== Draw ==
Key

- Q = Qualifier
- WC = Wild card
- LL = Lucky loser
- Alt = Alternate
- ITF = ITF entry
- PR = Protected ranking
- SR = Special ranking
- SE = Special exempt
- JE = Junior exempt
- JR = Junior Accelerator Programme entrant
- CO = College Accelerator Programme entrant
- NG = Next Gen Accelerator Program entrant
- w/o = Walkover
- r = Retired
- d = Defaulted

=== Finals ===
Semifinals
(Chinese Taipei) Joanna Garland	6	3	4
7	Darya Astakhova	1	6	6
(Australia) Kaylah McPhee	2	6	2
(Australia) Taylah Preston	6	4	6

Final
7	Darya Astakhova	3	4
(Australia) Taylah Preston	6	6

=== Top half ===
First round
1	(Australia) O Gadecki	6^{3}	2
(Chinese Taipei) J Garland	7^{7}	6
Q	(Japan) M Mushika	6	6
WC	(Australia) G Da Silva-Fick	4	1
(Japan) E Shimizu	0	2
Q	(China) F Liu	6	6
Q	(Japan) H Sato	1	4
6	(Australia) P Hon	6	6
3	(India) A Raina	1	3
(Japan) S Hosogi	6	6
(Japan) E Sema	6	6
WC	(Australia) A Parnaby	2	2
Q	(Australia) M Ercan	4	5
WC	(Australia) M Joint	6	7
Q	(Czech Republic) M Bayerlová	3	3
7	D Astakhova	6	6

Second round
(Chinese Taipei) J Garland	7	6
Q	(Japan) M Mushika	5	1
Q	(China) F Liu	6	5	3
6	(Australia) P Hon	4	7	6
(Japan) S Hosogi	7	2	6
(Japan) E Sema	5	6	3
WC	(Australia) M Joint	6	5	1
7	D Astakhova	2	7	6

Quarterfinals
(Chinese Taipei) J Garland	6	6
6	(Australia) P Hon	3	3
(Japan) S Hosogi	6^{5}	3
7	D Astakhova	7^{7}	6

Semifinals
(Chinese Taipei) J Garland	6	3	4
7	D Astakhova	1	6	6

=== Bottom half ===
First round
8	(Australia) S Mendez	6	6
Q	(Australia) E Micic	0	0
(Australia) P Hule	2	2
Q	(United States) L Ma	6	6
(Japan) Y Naito	6	3	2
(Australia) K McPhee	3	6	6
(Australia) T Gibson	4	6	1
4	(Australia) J Fourlis	6	1	6
5	(Australia) D Saville	2	4
Q	(China) H Shi	6	6
(Japan) M Kuramochi	2	6	3
(Australia) T Preston	6	3	6
WC	(Australia) I Popovic	6	6^{6}	2
(Japan) H Arakawa	4	7^{8}	6
(Australia) M Inglis	5	7	1
2	(Australia) D Aiava	7	5	6

Second round
8	(Australia) S Mendez	7	3	7
Q	(United States) L Ma	5	6	5
(Australia) K McPhee	6	6
4	(Australia) J Fourlis	2	0
Q	(China) H Shi	2	7	1
(Australia) T Preston	6	5	6
(Japan) H Arakawa	1	4
2	(Australia) D Aiava	6	6

Quarterfinals
8	(Australia) S Mendez	3	4
(Australia) K McPhee	6	6
(Australia) T Preston	3	7	6
2	(Australia) D Aiava	6	5	4

Semifinals
(Australia) K McPhee	2	6	2
(Australia) T Preston	6	4	6
