= 2017 Barcelona Women World Winner – Doubles =

Doubles
- 2017 Barcelona Women World Winner

Final
- Champion: (Paraguay) Montserrat González (Spain) Sílvia Soler Espinosa
- Runner-up: (Israel) Julia Glushko (Australia) Priscilla Hon
- Score: 6–4, 6–3

Events
Singles	Doubles
← 2016 ·	Barcelona Women World Winner	· 2018 →

Andrea Gámiz and Georgina García Pérez were the defending champions, but García Pérez chose not to participate. Gámiz partnered Daniela Seguel, but they lost in the semifinals to Montserrat González and Sílvia Soler Espinosa.

González and Soler Espinosa won the title, defeating Julia Glushko and Priscilla Hon in the final, 6–4, 6–3.

== Seeds ==
1. (Brazil) Laura Pigossi / (Switzerland) Jil Teichmann (semifinals)
2. (Paraguay) Montserrat González / (Spain) Sílvia Soler Espinosa (champions)
3. (Venezuela) Andrea Gámiz / (Chile) Daniela Seguel (semifinals)
4. (Ukraine) Alona Fomina / (Georgia (country)) Ekaterine Gorgodze (quarterfinals)

== Draw ==
=== Key ===
- Q = Qualifier
- WC = Wild card
- LL = Lucky loser
- Alt = Alternate
- SE = Special exempt
- PR = Protected ranking
- ITF = ITF entry
- JE = Junior exempt
- w/o = Walkover
- r = Retired
- d = Defaulted
- SR = Special ranking

First round
1	(Brazil) L Pigossi (Switzerland) J Teichmann	7	6
(Turkey) B Eraydın (Switzerland) C Perrin	5	4
(France) M Arcangioli (France) V Muntean	0	5
(Romania) C Dinu (Croatia) T Lukas	6	7
4	(Ukraine) A Fomina (Georgia (country)) E Gorgodze	w/o
(France) M Georges (France) C Paquet
WC	(Spain) A Alegre (Spain) N Garrido Femenias	0	0
(Israel) J Glushko (Australia) P Hon	6	6
(United States) UM Arconada (Ukraine) A Kalinina	6	6
(United States) J Elie (Mexico) R Zarazúa	2	1
(Japan) M Eguchi (Japan) E Hozumi	2	6	[6]
3	(Venezuela) A Gámiz (Chile) D Seguel	6	2	[10]
(France) A Hesse (Switzerland) R Masarova	4	6	[11]
(Spain) C Bucșa (Russia) V Kamenskaya	6	1	[13]
(Spain) C Hoste Ferrer (Spain) E Martínez Regalado	1	2
2	(Paraguay) M González (Spain) S Soler Espinosa	6	6

Quarterfinals
1	(Brazil) L Pigossi (Switzerland) J Teichmann	6	6
(Romania) C Dinu (Croatia) T Lukas	1	1
4	(Ukraine) A Fomina (Georgia (country)) E Gorgodze	3	4
(Israel) J Glushko (Australia) P Hon	6	6
(United States) UM Arconada (Ukraine) A Kalinina	6^{8}	7^{7}	[3]
3	(Venezuela) A Gámiz (Chile) D Seguel	7^{10}	6^{5}	[10]
(Spain) C Bucșa (Russia) V Kamenskaya	1	1
2	(Paraguay) M González (Spain) S Soler Espinosa	6	6

Semifinals
1	(Brazil) L Pigossi (Switzerland) J Teichmann	0	6	[5]
(Israel) J Glushko (Australia) P Hon	6	3	[10]
3	(Venezuela) A Gámiz (Chile) D Seguel	2	1
2	(Paraguay) M González (Spain) S Soler Espinosa	6	6

Final
(Israel) J Glushko (Australia) P Hon	4	3
2	(Paraguay) M González (Spain) S Soler Espinosa	6	6
