= 2017 Barcelona Women World Winner – Singles =

Singles
- 2017 Barcelona Women World Winner

Final
- Champion: (Chile) Daniela Seguel
- Runner-up: (France) Amandine Hesse
- Score: 3–6, 7–6^{(7–5)}, 7–6^{(7–3)}

Events
Singles	Doubles
- Barcelona Women World Winner

Océane Dodin was the defending champion but chose not to participate.

Daniela Seguel won the title, defeating Amandine Hesse in the final, 3–6, 7–6^{(7–5)}, 7–6^{(7–3)}.

== Seeds ==
1. (Czech Republic) Denisa Allertová (first round)
2. (Slovenia) Dalila Jakupović (first round)
3. (Spain) Sílvia Soler Espinosa (second round)
4. (Switzerland) Jil Teichmann (second round)
5. (Japan) Misa Eguchi (first round)
6. (Paraguay) Montserrat González (second round)
7. (Czech Republic) Marie Bouzková (withdrew)
8. (France) Myrtille Georges (first round)
9. (Switzerland) Conny Perrin (second round)

== Draw ==
Key

- Q = Qualifier
- WC = Wild card
- LL = Lucky loser
- Alt = Alternate
- ITF = ITF entry
- PR = Protected ranking
- SR = Special ranking
- SE = Special exempt
- JE = Junior exempt
- JR = Junior Accelerator Programme entrant
- CO = College Accelerator Programme entrant
- NG = Next Gen Accelerator Program entrant
- w/o = Walkover
- r = Retired
- d = Defaulted

=== Finals ===
Semifinals
(France) Amandine Hesse	6	6
(Japan) Eri Hozumi	3	2
(Chile) Daniela Seguel	6	7
(United States) Usue Maitane Arconada	0	5

Final
(France) Amandine Hesse	6	6^{5}	6^{3}
(Chile) Daniela Seguel	3	7^{7}	7^{7}

=== Top half ===
First round
1	(Czech Republic) D Allertová	6	4	1
(Turkey) B Eraydın	4	6	6
Q	(Russia) M Paigina	6	6
(Romania) C Dinu	1	1
(France) V Razzano	0^{r}
(France) A Hesse	4
Q	(Mexico) R Zarazúa	7^{7}	7^{7}
5	(Japan) M Eguchi	6^{5}	6^{2}
3	(Spain) S Soler Espinosa	7	6
(France) C Paquet	5	1
(Spain) O Sáez Larra	3	0
SE	(Venezuela) A Gámiz	6	6
WC	(Spain) C Bucșa	0	2
(Japan) E Hozumi	6	6
Q	(Croatia) T Lukas	6^{1}	5
9	(Switzerland) C Perrin	7^{7}	7

Second round
(Turkey) B Eraydın	7	6
Q	(Russia) M Paigina	5	4
(France) A Hesse	4	6	6
Q	(Mexico) R Zarazúa	6	2	3
3	(Spain) S Soler Espinosa	2	1
SE	(Venezuela) A Gámiz	6	6
(Japan) E Hozumi	6	6
9	(Switzerland) C Perrin	3	3

Quarterfinals
(Turkey) B Eraydın	2	2
(France) A Hesse	6	6
SE	(Venezuela) A Gámiz	3	7^{7}	5
(Japan) E Hozumi	6	6^{3}	7

Semifinals
(France) A Hesse	6	6
(Japan) E Hozumi	3	2

=== Bottom half ===
First round
6	(Paraguay) M González	6	6
WC	(Sweden) M Björklund	2	1
(Israel) J Glushko	6^{4}	6	2
(Chile) D Seguel	7^{7}	3	6
(United States) J Elie	6	6
LL	(France) M Arcangioli	3	2
(Ukraine) A Kalinina	4	1
4	(Switzerland) J Teichmann	6	6
8	(France) M Georges	6	0	6^{6}
(United States) UM Arconada	1	6	7^{8}
(Russia) V Kamenskaya	1	4
LL	(Australia) I Wallace	6	6
Q	(Spain) I Burillo Escorihuela	6	1	1
WC	(Spain) MT Torró Flor	4	6	6
WC	(Spain) P Badosa Gibert	6	6
2	(Slovenia) D Jakupović	2	2

Second round
6	(Paraguay) M González	3	3
(Chile) D Seguel	6	6
(United States) J Elie	7^{8}	6
4	(Switzerland) J Teichmann	6^{6}	3
(United States) UM Arconada	4	6	7^{9}
LL	(Australia) I Wallace	6	2	6^{7}
WC	(Spain) MT Torró Flor	6	4	5
WC	(Spain) P Badosa Gibert	3	6	7

Quarterfinals
(Chile) D Seguel	6	6
(United States) J Elie	3	0
(United States) UM Arconada	6	0
WC	(Spain) P Badosa Gibert	1	0^{r}

Semifinals
(Chile) D Seguel	6	7
(United States) UM Arconada	0	5
