= 2023 Brisbane QTC Tennis International – Women's doubles =

Women's doubles
- 2023 Brisbane QTC Tennis International

Final
- Champion: (Australia) Talia Gibson (Australia) Priscilla Hon
- Runner-up: (Australia) Destanee Aiava (Australia) Maddison Inglis
- Score: 4–6, 7–5, [10–5]

Events
Singles	men	women
Doubles	men	women
← 2019 ·	Brisbane QTC Tennis International	· 2024 →

Destanee Aiava and Naiktha Bains were the defending champions from when the tournament was last held in 2019, but with Bains choosing not to participate, Aiava played alongside Maddison Inglis, but lost in the final to Talia Gibson and Priscilla Hon.

Gibson and Hon won the title, defeating Aiava and Inglis in the final, 4–6, 7–5, [10–5].

== Seeds ==
1. (Indonesia) Jessy Rompies / (India) Prarthana Thombare (quarterfinals)
2. (Australia) Elysia Bolton / (Australia) Olivia Tjandramulia (first round)
3. (Australia) Talia Gibson / (Australia) Priscilla Hon (champions)
4. (Australia) Destanee Aiava / (Australia) Maddison Inglis (final)

== Draw ==
=== Key ===
- Q = Qualifier
- WC = Wild card
- LL = Lucky loser
- Alt = Alternate
- SE = Special exempt
- PR = Protected ranking
- ITF = ITF entry
- JE = Junior exempt
- w/o = Walkover
- r = Retired
- d = Defaulted
- SR = Special ranking

=== Draw ===
First round
1	(Indonesia) J Rompies (India) P Thombare	6	4	[10]
(Australia) P Hule (Australia) T Preston	3	6	[6]
WC	(Australia) M Ercan (Australia) A Smith	6	3	[5]
WC	(Australia) R Gilheany (Australia) M Joint	2	6	[10]
4	(Australia) D Aiava (Australia) M Inglis	4	6	[10]
(Czech Republic) M Bayerlová (Australia) K McPhee	6	2	[8]
(Australia) A Parnaby (Australia) I Popovic	6	7
Alt	(Japan) M Ayukawa (Japan) N Hanatani	3	5
(Japan) E Hayashi (Japan) E Shimizu	6	6
(Japan) H Arakawa (Japan) N Arakawa	3	2
(South Korea) D-y Back (Japan) S Imamura	2	4
3	(Australia) T Gibson (Australia) P Hon	6	6
D Astakhova (India) A Raina	6	7
(Australia) L Fairclough (Australia) O Gadecki	3	5
(China) F Liu (Japan) E Sema	6^{5}	6	[11]
2	(Australia) E Bolton (Australia) O Tjandramulia	7^{7}	4	[9]

Quarterfinals
1	(Indonesia) J Rompies (India) P Thombare	4	6	[5]
WC	(Australia) R Gilheany (Australia) M Joint	6	1	[10]
4	(Australia) D Aiava (Australia) M Inglis	6	6
(Australia) A Parnaby (Australia) I Popovic	4	0
(Japan) E Hayashi (Japan) E Shimizu	6	3	[6]
3	(Australia) T Gibson (Australia) P Hon	4	6	[10]
D Astakhova (India) A Raina	4	7	[10]
(China) F Liu (Japan) E Sema	6	5	[3]

Semifinals
WC	(Australia) R Gilheany (Australia) M Joint	1	1
4	(Australia) D Aiava (Australia) M Inglis	6	6
3	(Australia) T Gibson (Australia) P Hon	6	6^{4}	[10]
D Astakhova (India) A Raina	1	7^{7}	[7]

Final
4	(Australia) D Aiava (Australia) M Inglis	6	5	[5]
3	(Australia) T Gibson (Australia) P Hon	4	7	[10]
