= Brisbane QTC Tennis International =

Tennis tournament in Australia

Tournament information
- Event name: Brisbane QTC Tennis International
- Founded: 2015
- Location: Brisbane, Australia
- Venue: Queensland Tennis Centre
- Surface: Hard / outdoor
- Website: Website
ATP Tour
- Category: ITF Men's Circuit
- Draw: 48S/32Q/16D
- Prize money: $25,000
WTA Tour
- Category: ITF Women's Circuit
- Draw: 32S/64Q/16D
- Prize money: $60,000

The Brisbane QTC Tennis International is a tournament for professional male and female tennis players played on outdoor hardcourts. It is currently part of the ITF Women's Circuit and Men's Circuit. The event is classified as a $60,000 ITF Women's World Tennis Tour and a $25,000 ITF Men's World Tennis Tour tournament and has been held in Brisbane, Australia, since 2015. From 2015 to 2019, the women's tournament was a $25k event and held regularly in late September or October. In 2023, the tournament was upgraded to $60,000 and moved to November, the men's tournament remained a $25k event.

== Past finals ==
=== Men's singles ===
Year	Champion	Runner-up	Score
2026	For the 2026 Brisbane QTC 3 Challenger held in November, see Brisbane Tennis International		
2025 (2)	(Australia) Dane Sweeny	(Denmark) Carl Emil Overbeck	6–7^{(5–7)}, 6–3, 6–2
2025 (1)	(Australia) Marc Polmans	(Australia) Dane Sweeny	1–6, 7–6^{(7–2)}, 6–3
2024	(Australia) Blake Ellis	(Australia) Blake Mott	6–1, 6–3
2023	(Japan) Shintaro Imai	(Australia) Blake Ellis	6–4, 7–6^{(7–3)}
2020–22	not held		
2019	(Australia) Dayne Kelly	(Australia) Luke Saville	6–2, 6–4
2018	(United Kingdom) Evan Hoyt	(Northern Mariana Islands) Colin Sinclair	6–4, 7–6^{(7–5)}
2017	(Australia) Bradley Mousley	(Australia) Benjamin Mitchell	6–3, 4–6, 6–2
2016	(United States) Jarmere Jenkins	(Australia) Marc Polmans	6–1, 7–5
2015	(Australia) Gavin van Peperzeel	(Australia) Luke Saville	7–6^{(8–6)}, 2–6, 7–6^{(9–7)}

=== Women's singles ===
Year	Champion	Runner-up	Score
2025 (2)	(Australia) Taylah Preston	(Japan) Natsumi Kawaguchi	6–2, 6–4
2025 (1)	(China) Tian Fangran	(United Kingdom) Katie Swan	2–6, 7–6^{(7–5)}, 6–1
2024	(Australia) Destanee Aiava	(Australia) Lizette Cabrera	7–6^{(7–4)}, 4–6, 6–3
2023	(Australia) Taylah Preston	Darya Astakhova	6–3, 6–4
2020–22	not held		
2019	(United States) Asia Muhammad	(Australia) Maddison Inglis	6–3, 3–6, 6–3
2018	(China) Xu Shilin	(Australia) Ellen Perez	6–4, 6–3
2017	(Australia) Kimberly Birrell	(United States) Asia Muhammad	4–6, 6–3, 6–2
2016	(Australia) Lizette Cabrera	(Slovakia) Viktória Kužmová	6–2, 6–4
2015	(Australia) Priscilla Hon	(Australia) Kimberly Birrell	6–4, 6–3

=== Men's doubles ===
Year	Champions	Runners-up	Score
2025 (2)	(Australia) Joshua Charlton (United Kingdom) Emile Hudd	(Japan) Yuichiro Inui (Denmark) Carl Emil Overbeck	6–3, 6–1
2025 (1)	(Australia) Ethan Cook (Australia) Tai Sach	(Australia) Joshua Charlton (United Kingdom) Emile Hudd	6–4, 5–7, [10–7]
2024	(Northern Mariana Islands) Colin Sinclair (Australia) Brandon Walkin	(Australia) Joshua Charlton (United Kingdom) Emile Hudd	7–6^{(7–3)}, 6–3
2023	(Australia) Thomas Fancutt (New Zealand) Ajeet Rai	(Australia) Joshua Charlton (United Kingdom) Emile Hudd	6–4, 6–4
2020–22	not held		
2019	(Australia) Jake Delaney (Australia) Luke Saville	(Philippines) Francis Alcantara (Australia) Harry Bourchier	6–1, 3–6, [10–6]
2018	(Australia) Jeremy Beale (Australia) Thomas Fancutt	(United Kingdom) Brydan Klein (Australia) Scott Puodziunas	2–6, 6–4, [10–6]
2017	(Australia) Maverick Banes (Australia) Blake Ellis	(United States) Nathan Pasha (Australia) Darren Polkinghorne	6–4, 1–6, [10–4]
2016	(Australia) Dayne Kelly (Australia) Bradley Mousley	(Australia) Harry Bourchier (Australia) James Frawley	6–2, 6–3
2015	(Australia) Steven de Waard (Australia) Marc Polmans	(Australia) Thomas Fancutt (Australia) Darren Polkinghorne	6–0, 6–1

=== Women's doubles ===
Year	Champions	Runners-up	Score
2025 (2)	(New Zealand) Monique Barry (Japan) Natsumi Kawaguchi	(Australia) Tenika McGiffin (Japan) Naho Sato	7–5, 6–3
2025 (1)	(Chinese Taipei) Lee Ya-hsin (Chinese Taipei) Lin Fang-an	(Australia) Tenika McGiffin (Japan) Naho Sato	6–7^{(6–8)}, 6–4, [10–8]
2024	(Australia) Destanee Aiava (Australia) Maddison Inglis	(Japan) Yuki Naito (India) Ankita Raina	6–3, 6–4
2023	(Australia) Talia Gibson (Australia) Priscilla Hon	(Australia) Destanee Aiava (Australia) Maddison Inglis	4–6, 7–5, [10–5]
2020–22	not held		
2019	(Australia) Destanee Aiava (United Kingdom) Naiktha Bains	(Australia) Alison Bai (New Zealand) Paige Hourigan	6–3, 6–3
2018	(Australia) Maddison Inglis (Australia) Kaylah McPhee	(India) Rutuja Bhosale (China) Xu Shilin	7–5, 6–4
2017	(Australia) Naiktha Bains (Papua New Guinea) Abigail Tere-Apisah	(United States) Jennifer Elie (Japan) Erika Sema	6–4, 6–1
2016	(Australia) Naiktha Bains (Papua New Guinea) Abigail Tere-Apisah	(Israel) Julia Glushko (China) Liu Fangzhou	6–7^{(4–7)}, 6–2, [10–3]
2015	(United States) Lauren Embree (United States) Asia Muhammad	(Thailand) Noppawan Lertcheewakarn (Thailand) Varatchaya Wongteanchai	6–2, 4–6, [11–9]
