= Trofeu Internacional Ciutat de Barcelona =

ITF Women's Tour
- Event name: Trofeu Internacional Ciutat de Barcelona (2017–); Barcelona Women World Winner (2015–16)
- Location: Barcelona, Spain
- Venue: Club Esportiu Hispano Francès
- Category: ITF $60,000
- Surface: Clay
- Prize money: $60,000
- Website: www.cdhispanofr.com

The Trofeu Internacional Ciutat de Barcelona is a tennis tournament held on outdoor clay courts at Club Esportiu Hispano Franès in Barcelona, Spain. It has been held since 2015 and is part of the ITF Women's Circuit as a $60,000 event.

== Past finals ==
=== Singles ===
Year	Champion	Runner-up	Score
2019	(United States) Allie Kiick	(Turkey) Çağla Büyükakçay	7–6^{(7–3)}, 3–6, 6–1
2018	(Spain) Estrella Cabeza Candela	(Spain) Aliona Bolsova	6–2, 6–3
2017	(Chile) Daniela Seguel	(France) Amandine Hesse	3–6, 7–6^{(7–5)}, 7–6^{(7–3)}
2016	(France) Océane Dodin	(Romania) Ioana Loredana Roșca	6–3, 6–4
2015	(France) Myrtille Georges	(Spain) Georgina García Pérez	6–3, 7–6^{(7–3)}

=== Doubles ===
Year	Champions	Runners-up	Score
2019	(Japan) Kyōka Okamura (Japan) Moyuka Uchijima	(Spain) Marina Bassols Ribera (Spain) Yvonne Cavallé Reimers	7–6^{(9–7)}, 6–4
2018	(United States) Jessica Ho (China) Wang Xiyu	(Brazil) Carolina Meligeni Alves (France) Jade Suvrijn	6–3, 6–1
2017	(Paraguay) Montserrat González (Spain) Sílvia Soler Espinosa	(Israel) Julia Glushko (Australia) Priscilla Hon	6–4, 6–3
2016	(Venezuela) Andrea Gámiz (Spain) Georgina García Pérez	(Italy) Alice Matteucci (Switzerland) Jil Teichmann	6–2, 7–5
2015	(Spain) Aliona Bolsova (Italy) Gaia Sanesi	(Spain) Estrella Cabeza Candela (Ukraine) Oleksandra Korashvili	6–3, 6–4
