= Priscilla Hon =

Australian tennis player (born 1998)

- Hon at the 2026 Web Summit
- Country (sports): Australia
- Residence: Brisbane, Australia
- Born: 10 May 1998 (age 28) Brisbane, Australia
- Height: 5 ft 8 in (1.73 m)
- Plays: Right (two-handed backhand)
- Coach: Cara Black
- Prize money: $2,499,988

Singles
- Career record: 335–256
- Career titles: 13 ITF
- Highest ranking: No. 94 (13 October 2025)
- Current ranking: No. 232 (28 September 2026)

Grand Slam singles results
- Australian Open: 2R (2020, 2026)
- French Open: 2R (2019)
- Wimbledon: 1R (2025)
- US Open: 3R (2025)

Doubles
- Career record: 144–125
- Career titles: 13 ITF
- Highest ranking: No. 91 (2 April 2018)
- Current ranking: No. 164 (28 September 2026)

Grand Slam doubles results
- Australian Open: 2R (2022, 2023)
- Wimbledon: Q1 (2018)

Grand Slam mixed doubles results
- Australian Open: 2R (2025)

Team competitions
- Fed Cup: F (2022)
- Last updated on: 28 September 2026.

Priscilla Hon (born 10 May 1998) is an Australian tennis player. She has achieved career-high WTA rankings of No. 94 in singles on 13 October 2025 and No. 91 in doubles on 2 April 2018.

== Personal life ==
Hon was born in Brisbane in 1998 to Hong Kong parents who immigrated to Australia from Hong Kong in 1996. As a young child, she was encouraged to pursue many different athletic pursuits. Hon attended Brisbane's Citipointe Christian College throughout her upbringing.

== Career ==
=== Juniors ===
On the junior circuit, Hon achieved a career-high ranking of No. 13 in the world. She reached the semifinals of the 2014 Wimbledon Championships girls' doubles.

=== 2015 ===
In January 2015 at age 16, Hon made her senior major main-draw debut at the Australian Open., as one of seven wildcard teams in women's doubles, partnering with fellow Australian Kimberly Birrell who was also age 16. They lost to the fifth-seeded Americans Raquel Kops-Jones and Abigail Spears in straight sets.

In March, Hon won her first ITF tournaments at the $15k event in Mornington where she claimed the singles title defeating Sandra Zaniewska in the final as well as claiming the doubles title alongside Tammi Patterson.

In November, she won her second ITF singles title at the $25k event in Brisbane, defeating fellow Australian Kimberly Birrell in the final.

=== 2016–2018: Major debut ===
Hon was given a wildcard into the main draw of the 2016 Brisbane International, but she lost to Samantha Crawford, in straight sets. Hon was awarded a main-draw wildcard into the 2016 Australian Open, after winning the U-18 National Championships in December 2015. She lost in round one to Annika Beck, in straight sets. In May 2016, Hon won her first title outside of Australia, defeating Jessica Crivelletto in the final of the ITF Santa Margherita di Pula.

In August 2017, Hon made the semifinals at Gatineau after qualifying. In September, she qualified for the 2017 Korea Open and won her first WTA Tour match against Karolína Muchová. Hon defeated Arantxa Rus to make the quarterfinals, where she lost to Richèl Hogenkamp.

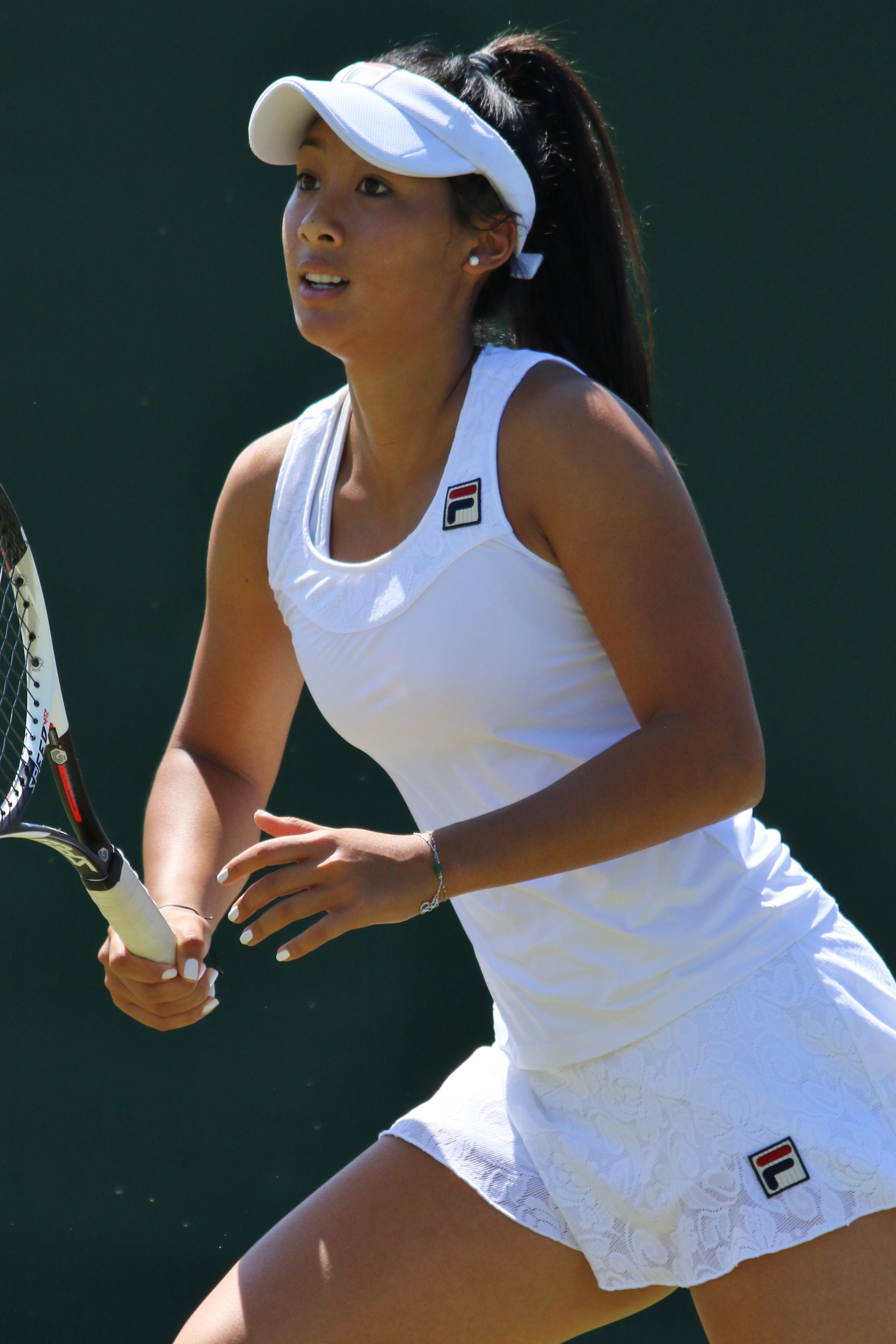
Hon at the 2018 Wimbledon Championships

In June 2018, Hon reached the semifinals of the Surbiton Trophy, where she lost to eventual champion Alison Riske.

=== 2019–2021: Australian & French Open first wins, US Open debut, injury ===
Hon commenced 2019 at the Brisbane International, where she was awarded a wildcard and lost to Harriet Dart in round one. At Sydney, she defeated Tatjana Maria in round one, before losing to Aliaksandra Sasnovich in three sets. At the Australian Open, she also was awarded a wildcard but lost in the first round to Astra Sharma.

In February 2019, Hon represented Australia for the first time in Fed Cup partnering with Ashleigh Barty in doubles. The pair won the deciding rubber (6–4, 7–5) against the U.S. team resulting in Australia progressing to the semifinal.

In May 2019, Hon achieved her first main-draw win at a major by defeating Tímea Babos in three sets at the French Open, before falling to eventual quarterfinalist Madison Keys, in three sets in the second round. In August, at the 2019 US Open, she qualified for the singles main draw, before losing to Margarita Gasparyan in the first round.

At the 2020 Australian Open, Hon reached the second round for the first time by defeating Kateryna Kozlova. Hon lost in her second round to Angelique Kerber. In February, Hon qualified for the Qatar Ladies Open, before losing in the first round to Ajla Tomljanović. In March, she lost in the first round of Lyon Open to qualifier Jaqueline Cristian.

During the COVID-19 pandemic hiatus, Hon suffered a hip injury which kept her out of action for over a year. In May 2021 Hon's first competitive match for the season was in the first round of French Open qualifying which she lost. In June, she finished runner-up in the doubles competition of the ITF Nottingham event with Storm Sanders.

=== 2022–2024: First top 20 win ===
Hon started 2022 at the Adelaide International, where she was given a wildcard entry and scored her first top-20 win, defeating world No. 17, Petra Kvitová, in three sets. She lost in the second round to Victoria Azarenka. Following this performance, Hon was awarded a wildcard into the Australian Open, losing in the first round to 31st seed Markéta Vondroušová.

She qualified for the main draw at the 2024 US Open, but lost in the first round to second seed and eventual champion, Aryna Sabalenka.

During the 2024 Asian swing, Hon qualified for the Korea Open and the Pan Pacific Open but lost in the first round at both to Polina Kudermetova and Katie Boulter respectively. At the Hong Kong Open, she qualified for the main draw and defeated wildcard Eudice Chong, before losing to top seed Diana Shnaider in the second round.

=== 2025: US Open third round, Wimbledon and top 100 debuts ===
Partnering with Anna Kalinskaya, Hon finished runner-up in the doubles at the Brisbane International, losing to Mirra Andreeva and Diana Shnaider in the final. At the Australian Open, she came runner-up in the inaugural 1 Point Slam, losing to Omar Jasika in the final.

In February, she won the singles title at the W75 Queensland International, defeating Leonie Küng in the final.

Hon qualified to make her debut at Wimbledon, but lost to 18th seed Ekaterina Alexandrova in the first round. She also qualified for the US Open and defeated Léolia Jeanjean to reach the second round for the first time. Hon then defeated 17th seed Liudmila Samsonova in three sets, recording the biggest win of her career by ranking, at which point her run was ended by Ann Li in the third round.

Having made it through qualifying at the China Open, Hon defeated Viktorija Golubic to record her first main-draw win at a WTA 1000 event, before overcoming 22nd seed Jeļena Ostapenko to reach the third round, where she lost to 15th seed Belinda Bencic, in three sets. As a result of her run at the tournament, she reached the top 100 in the singles rankings on 6 October 2025.

== Performance timelines ==
Key
W	F	SF	QF	#R	RR	Q#	P#	DNQ	A	Z#	PO	G	S	B	NMS	NTI	P	NH

(W) winner; (F) finalist; (SF) semifinalist; (QF) quarterfinalist; (#R) rounds 4, 3, 2, 1; (RR) round-robin stage; (Q#) qualification round; (P#) preliminary round; (DNQ) did not qualify; (A) absent; (Z#) Davis/Fed Cup Zonal Group (with number indication) or (PO) play-off; (G) gold, (S) silver or (B) bronze Olympic/Paralympic medal; (NMS) not a Masters tournament; (NTI) not a Tier I tournament; (P) postponed; (NH) not held; (SR) strike rate (events won / competed); (W–L) win–loss record.
To avoid confusion and double counting, these charts are updated at the conclusion of a tournament or when the player's participation has ended.

Only main-draw results in WTA Tour, Grand Slam tournaments, Billie Jean King Cup and Olympic Games are included in win–loss records.

=== Singles ===
Current through the 2026 Australian Open.

Tournament	2016	2017	2018	2019	2020	2021	2022	2023	2024	2025	2026	SR	W–L
Grand Slam tournaments
Australian Open	1R	A	Q3	1R	2R	A	1R	Q2	Q3	Q2	2R	0 / 5	2–5
French Open	A	A	Q1	2R	A	Q1	Q2	Q1	Q2	Q1	Q1	0 / 1	1–1
Wimbledon	A	A	Q2	Q2	NH	Q3	Q3	Q2	Q1	1R	Q1	0 / 1	0–1
US Open	A	A	Q1	1R	A	A	Q2	Q2	1R	3R	Q2	0 / 3	2–3
Win–loss	0–1	0–0	0–0	1–3	1–1	0–0	0–1	0–0	0–1	2–2	1–1	0 / 10	5–10
WTA 1000
Dubai (Note: The first Premier 5 event of the year has switched back and forth between the Dubai Tennis Championships and the Qatar Ladies Open since 2009 until 2024. Dubai was classified as a Premier 5 event from 2009 to 2011 before being succeeded by Doha for the 2012–2014 period. In 2015, Dubai regained its Premier 5 status while Doha was demoted to Premier status. The Premier 5 tournaments were reclassified as WTA 1000 tournaments in 2021.)	A	A	A	A	NTI	A	A	A	A	A	Q1	0 / 0	0–0
Qatar Open	A	A	A	A	1R	A	A	A	A	A	Q1	0 / 1	0–1
Indian Wells Open	A	A	A	1R	NH	Q2	Q1	A	A	A	Q2	0 / 1	0–1
Miami Open	A	A	A	A	NH	A	Q1	A	A	A	Q1	0 / 0	0–0
Madrid Open	A	A	A	A	NH	A	A	A	A	Q1	A	0 / 0	0–0
Italian Open	A	A	A	A	A	A	A	Q2	A	A	A	0 / 0	0–0
Canadian Open	A	A	A	Q1	NH	A	Q1	A	Q1	Q1	A	0 / 0	0–0
Cincinnati Open	A	A	A	A	A	A	A	A	A	Q2	A	0 / 0	0–0
China Open	A	A	A	A	NH				Q2	3R		0 / 1	2–1
Wuhan Open	A	A	A	A	NH				A	A		0 / 0	0–0
Career statistics
Tournaments	2	2	3	10	5	0	4	1	1	3	1	Career total: 32	
Overall win-loss	0–2	2–2	1–3	5–10	1–5	0–0	1–4	0–1	0–1	4–3	1–1	0 / 32	15–32
Year-end ranking	499	221	158	126	147	256	151	210	193	104		$1,023,480	

=== Doubles ===
Tournament	2015	2016	2017	2018	2019	2020	2021	2022	2023	2024	2025	W–L
Australian Open	1R	1R	1R	1R	1R	1R	A	2R	2R	1R	1R	2–10
French Open	A	A	A	A	A	A	A	A	A	A	A	0–0
Wimbledon	A	A	A	Q1	A	NH	A	A	A	A	A	0–0
US Open	A	A	A	A	A	A	A	A	A	A	A	0–0
Win–loss	0–1	0–1	0–1	0–1	0–1	0–1	0–0	1–1	1–1	0–0	0–1	2–10
Career statistics
Year-end ranking	325	540	115	110	641	909	550	340	208	376	99	

== WTA Tour finals ==
=== Doubles: 1 (runner-up) ===
Legend WTA 500 (0–1)	Finals by surface Hard (0–1)	Finals by setting Outdoor (0–1)

Result	W–L	Date	Tournament	Tier	Surface	Partner	Opponents	Score
Loss	0–1	Jan 2025	Brisbane International, Australia	WTA 500	Hard	Anna Kalinskaya	Mirra Andreeva; Diana Shnaider	6–7^{(6–8)}, 5–7

== ITF Circuit finals ==
=== Singles: 15 (13 titles, 2 runner-ups) ===
Legend W60/75 tournaments W50 tournaments W25 tournaments W10/15 tournaments	Finals by surface Hard (10–1) Clay (3–1)

Result	W–L	Date	Tournament	Tier	Surface	Opponent	Score
Win	1–0	Mar 2015	ITF Mornington, Australia	W15	Clay	(Poland) Sandra Zaniewska	5–7, 6–3, 7–6^{(4)}
Win	2–0	Oct 2015	Brisbane QTC International, Australia	W25	Hard	(Australia) Kimberly Birrell	6–4, 6–3
Win	3–0	May 2016	ITF Santa Marherita di Pula, Italy	W10	Clay	(Switzerland) Jessica Crivelletto	6–2, 6–2
Win	4–0	Oct 2018	Bendigo International, Australia	W60	Hard	(Australia) Ellen Perez	6–4, 4–6, 7–5
Loss	4–1	Mar 2019	Clay Court International, Australia	W25	Clay	(Australia) Olivia Rogowska	6–7^{(6)}, 3–6
Loss	4–2	Feb 2022	ITF Canberra, Australia	W25	Hard	(United States) Asia Muhammad	7–6, 3–6, 2–6
Win	5–2	May 2022	ITF Netanya, Israel	W25	Hard	(Belgium) Yanina Wickmayer	6–1, 6–3
Win	6–2	Jul 2022	ITF Nottingham, United Kingdom	W25	Hard	(United Kingdom) Maia Lumsden	6–3, 3–6, 6–3
Win	7–2	Oct 2022	ITF Cairns, Australia	W25	Hard	(Australia) Kimberly Birrell	4–6, 7–6^{(6)}, 6–4
Win	8–2	Mar 2023	Clay Court International, Australia	W60	Clay	(Australia) Olivia Gadecki	4–6, 6–2, 6–4
Win	9–2	Sep 2023	ITF Perth, Australia	W25	Hard	(Australia) Talia Gibson	6–1, 3–6, 6–3
Win	10–2	Feb 2024	Burnie International, Australia	W75	Hard	(Japan) Sara Saito	6–3, 6–0
Win	11–2	Nov 2024	ITF Caloundra, Australia	W50	Hard	(Japan) Himeno Sakatsume	6–4, 7–5
Win	12–2	Jan 2025	Brisbane QTC International, Australia	W75	Hard	(Switzerland) Leonie Küng	6–4, 4–6, 6–2
Win	13–2	Mar 2025	ITF Târgu Mureș, Romania	W75	Hard (i)	(Netherlands) Arianne Hartono	6–3, 6–4

=== Doubles: 20 (13 titles, 7 runner-ups) ===
Legend W100 tournaments W60/75 tournaments W25 tournaments W15 tournaments	Finals by surface Hard (4–3) Clay (9–3) Grass (0–1)

Result	W–L	Date	Tournament	Tier	Surface	Partner	Opponents	Score
Loss	0–1	Oct 2014	ITF Toowoomba, Australia	W15	Hard	(Australia) Lizette Cabrera	(Australia) Jessica Moore (Australia) Abbie Myers	3–6, 3–6
Win	1–1	Mar 2015	ITF Mornington, Australia	W15	Clay	(Australia) Tammi Patterson	(Japan) Mana Ayukawa (Japan) Ayaka Okuno	6–4, 7–6^{(4)}
Win	2–1	Apr 2015	ITF Melbourne, Australia	W15	Clay	(Australia) Tammi Patterson	(Poland) Agata Barańska (Poland) Sandra Zaniewska	2–6, 6–4, [12–10]
Win	3–1	May 2015	ITF Santa Margherita die Pula, Italy	W10	Clay	(Spain) Aliona Bolsova	(Spain) Eva Guerrero Álvarez (Spain) Cristina Bucșa	6–0, 6–3
Win	4–1	Aug 2015	ITF Leipzig, Germany	W15	Clay	(Switzerland) Jil Teichmann	(Switzerland) Conny Perrin (Austria) Pia König	6–1, 6–4
Loss	4–2	Oct 2015	ITF Tweed Heads, Australia	W15	Hard	(Hungary) Dalma Gálfi	(Australia) Tammi Patterson (Australia) Kimberly Birrell	7–6^{(3)}, 3–6, [8–10]
Win	5–2	Mar 2017	ITF Mornington, Australia	W25	Clay	(Hungary) Fanny Stollár	(Australia) Jessica Moore (Thailand) Varatchaya Wongteanchai	6–1, 7–5
Win	6–2	Jun 2017	Grado Tennis Cup, Italy	W25	Clay	(Israel) Julia Glushko	(Switzerland) Conny Perrin (Croatia) Tereza Mrdeža	7–5, 6–2
Win	7–2	Jun 2017	Internazionali di Brescia, Italy	W60	Clay	(Israel) Julia Glushko	(Paraguay) Montserrat González (Belarus) Ilona Kremen	2–6, 7–6^{(4)}, [10–8]
Loss	7–3	Jun 2017	Internacional de Barcelona, Spain	W60	Clay	(Israel) Julia Glushko	(Paraguay) Montserrat González (Spain) Sílvia Soler Espinosa	4–6, 3–6
Win	8–3	Jun 2017	ITF Warsaw, Poland	W25	Clay	(Belarus) Vera Lapko	(Poland) Katarzyna Kawa (Poland) Katarzyna Piter	7–6^{(3)}, 6–4
Win	9–3	Aug 2017	Lexington Challenger, United States	W60	Hard	(Belarus) Vera Lapko	(Japan) Hiroko Kuwata (Russia) Valeria Savinykh	6–3, 6–4
Win	10–3	Mar 2018	Clay Court International, Australia	W60	Clay	(Slovenia) Dalila Jakupović	(Japan) Makoto Ninomiya (Japan) Miyu Kato	6–4, 4–6, [10–7]
Loss	10–4	Jun 2021	Nottingham Trophy, UK	W100	Grass	(Australia) Storm Sanders	(Romania) Monica Niculescu (Romania) Elena-Gabriela Ruse	5–7, 5–7
Loss	10–5	Mar 2023	Clay Court International, Australia	W60	Clay	(Slovenia) Dalila Jakupović	(Australia) Elysia Bolton (Australia) Alexandra Bozovic	6–4, 5–7, [11–13]
Win	11–5	Apr 2023	ITF Kashiwa, Japan	W25	Hard	(Netherlands) Arianne Hartono	(Japan) Saki Imamura (Japan) Naho Sato	6–4, 3–6, [10–7]
Loss	11–6	Apr 2023	ITF Istanbul, Turkey	W60	Clay	(Ukraine) Valeriya Strakhova	(Slovenia) Dalila Jakupović (Russia) Irina Khromacheva	6–4, 5–7, [11–13]
Win	12–6	Oct 2023	Playford International, Australia	W60	Hard	(Australia) Talia Gibson	(Australia) Kaylah McPhee (Australia) Astra Sharma	6–1, 6–2
Win	13–6	Nov 2023	Brisbane QTC International, Australia	W60	Hard	(Australia) Talia Gibson	(Australia) Destanee Aiava (Australia) Maddison Inglis	4–6, 7–5, [10–5]
Loss	13–7	Feb 2025	ITF Prague, Czech Republic	W75	Hard (i)	(Switzerland) Rebeka Masarova	(Czech Republic) Jesika Malečková (Czech Republic) Miriam Škoch	0–6, 2–6
