= Amandine Hesse =

French tennis player (born 1993)

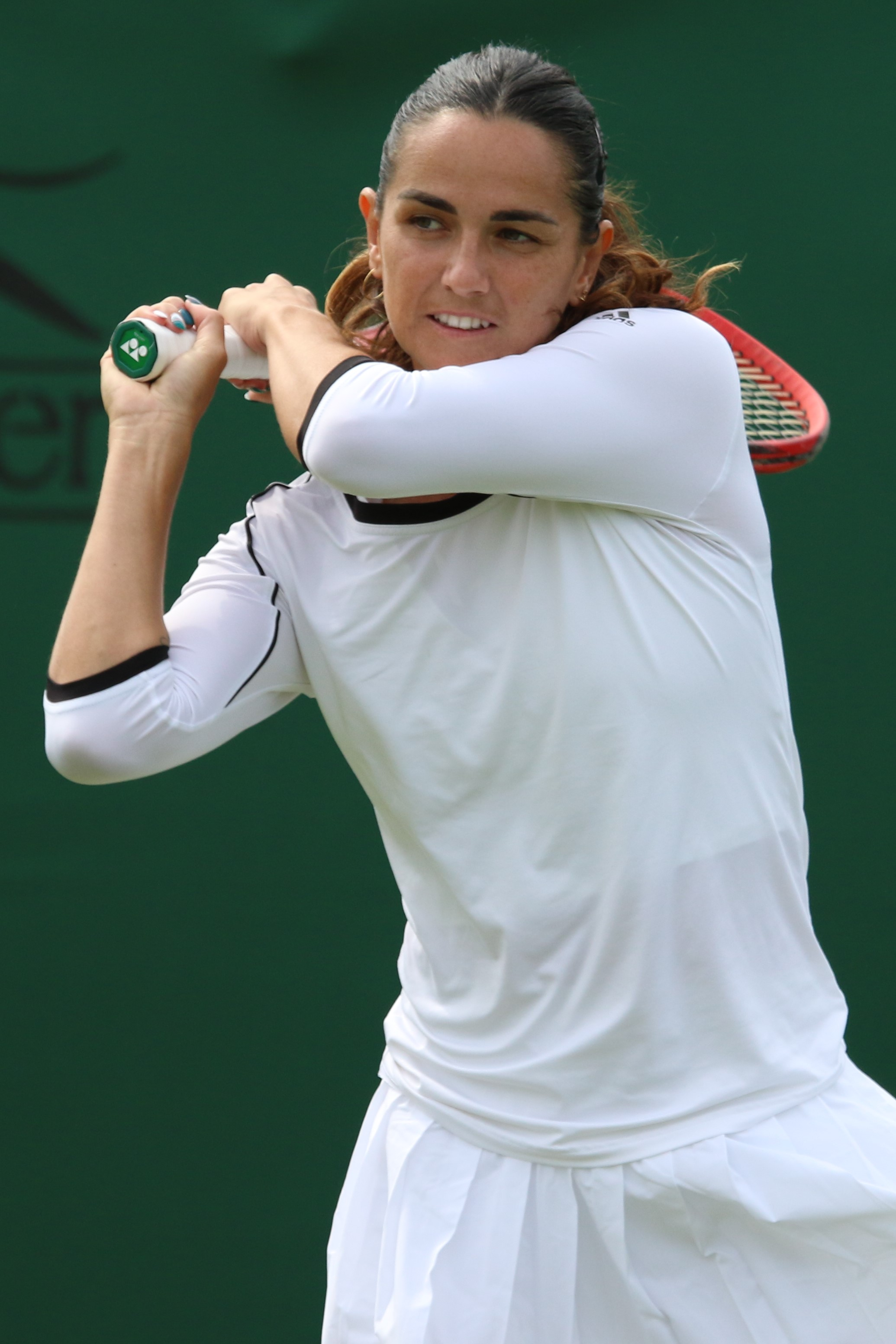
- Hesse at the 2023 Wimbledon qualifying
- Country (sports): France
- Born: 16 January 1993 (age 33) Montauban, France
- Height: 1.64 m (5 ft 5 in)
- Turned pro: 2007
- Plays: Right (two-handed backhand)
- Prize money: $1,049,774

Singles
- Career record: 474–441
- Career titles: 6 ITF
- Highest ranking: No. 154 (9 May 2016)
- Current ranking: No. 403 (28 September 2026)

Grand Slam singles results
- Australian Open: Q2 (2016, 2017, 2019)
- French Open: 2R (2015)
- Wimbledon: Q2 (2019)
- US Open: 1R (2014, 2017)

Doubles
- Career record: 174–188
- Career titles: 8 ITF
- Highest ranking: No. 108 (2 May 2016)
- Current ranking: No. 1,044 (28 September 2026)

Grand Slam doubles results
- French Open: 2R (2015)

Grand Slam mixed doubles results
- French Open: QF (2019)

Team competitions
- Fed Cup: 3–1
- Last updated on: 8 October 2026.

Amandine Hesse (French pronunciation: [amɑ̃din ɛs]; born 16 January 1993) is a French professional tennis player.

Hesse has won six singles and eight doubles titles on the ITF Circuit. On 9 May 2016, she reached her career-high WTA singles ranking of No. 154. On 2 May 2016, she peaked at world No. 108 in the doubles rankings.

Playing for the France Fed Cup team, Hesse has a win–loss record of 3–1.

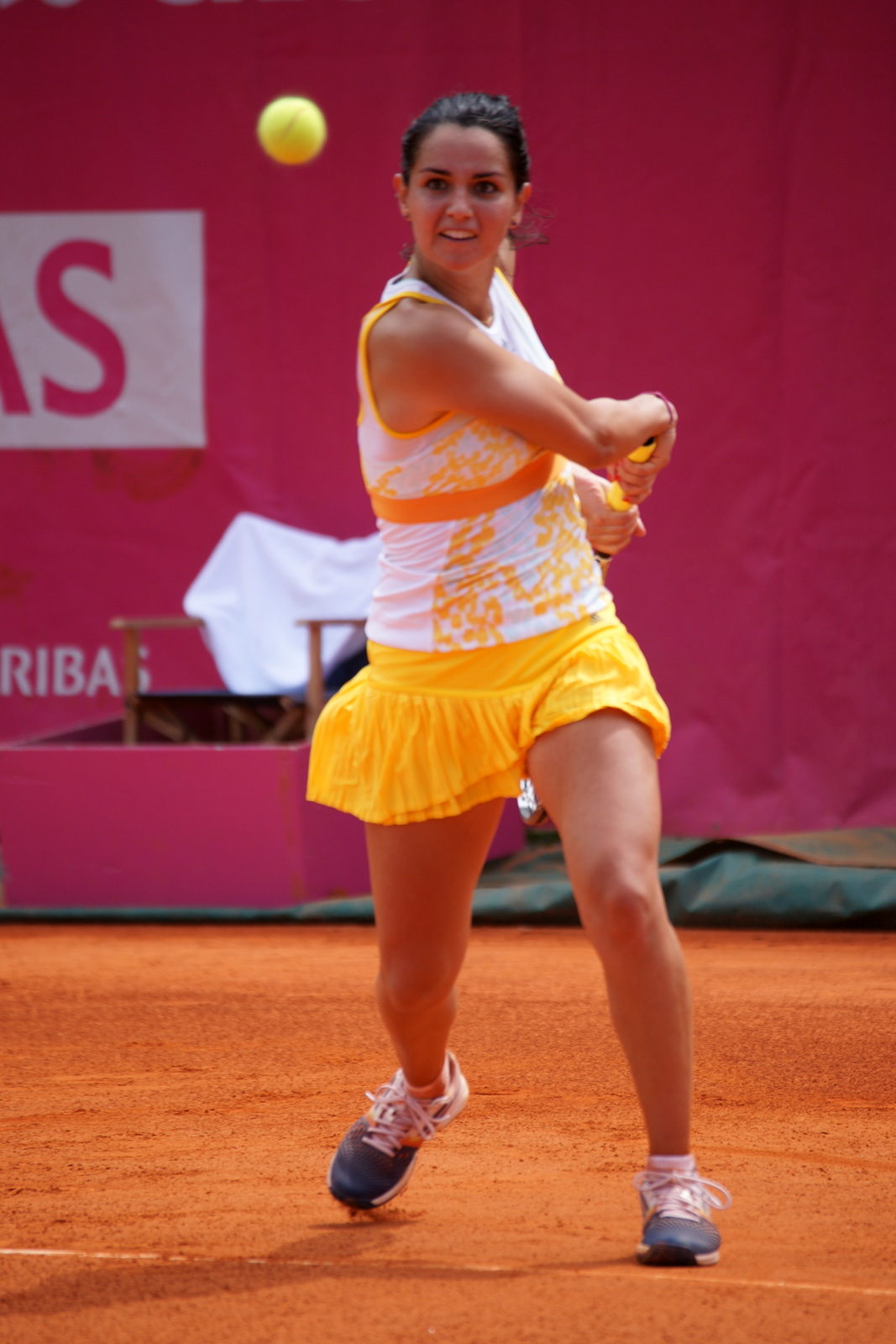
Hesse at the 2014 Open de Cagnes-sur-Mer

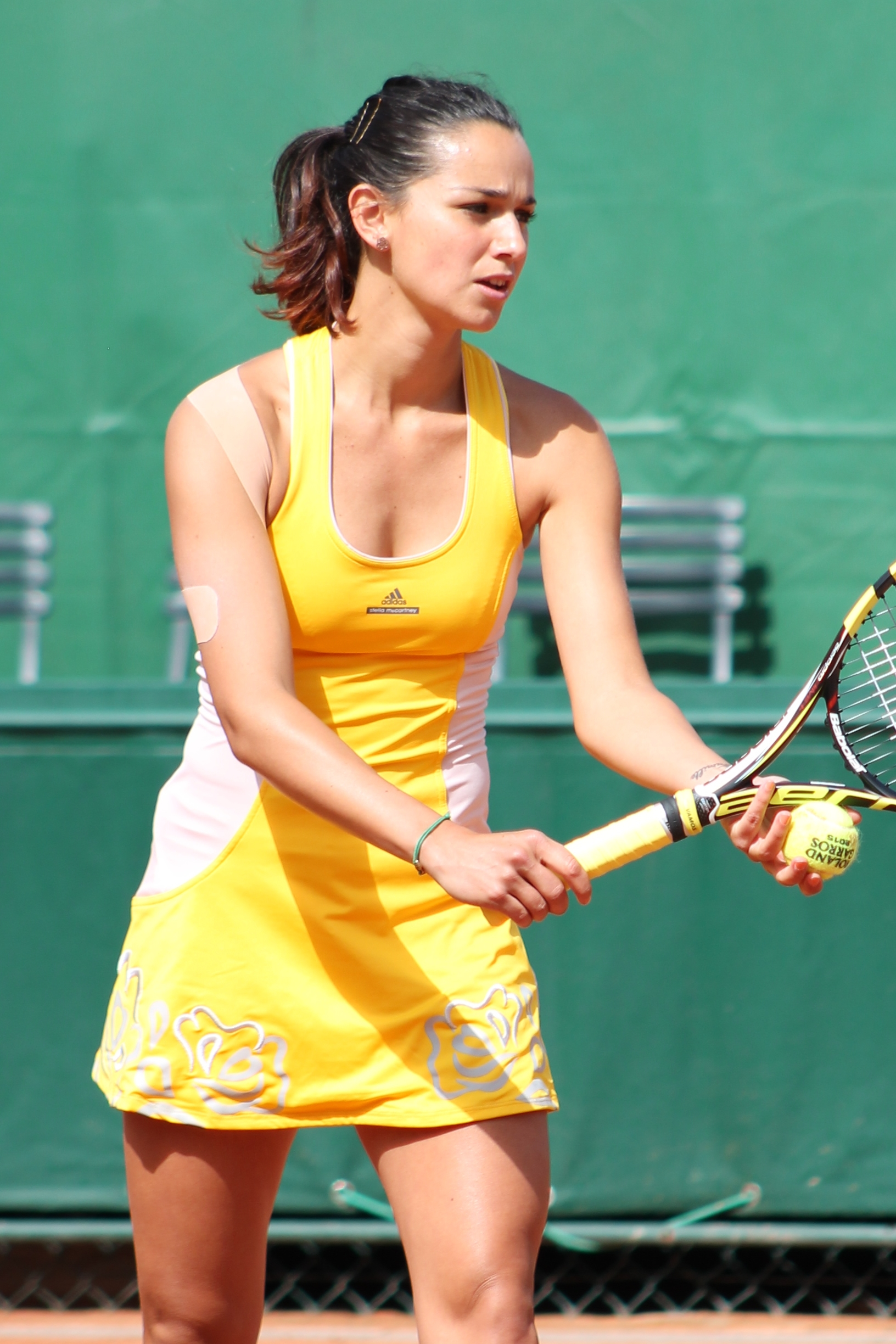
Hesse in 2015

== Personal life ==
Amandine Hesse was born in Montauban and started playing tennis at the age of five. She is coached by father, Yannick Hesse. Her mother's name is Nicole. She has two half-sisters, Géraldine and Stéphanie.

== Grand Slam performance timelines ==
Key
W	F	SF	QF	#R	RR	Q#	DNQ	A	NH

(W) winner; (F) finalist; (SF) semifinalist; (QF) quarterfinalist; (#R) rounds 4, 3, 2, 1; (RR) round-robin stage; (Q#) qualification round; (DNQ) did not qualify; (A) absent; (NH) not held; (SR) strike rate (events won / competed); (W–L) win–loss record.
To avoid confusion and double counting, these charts are updated at the conclusion of a tournament or when the player's participation has ended.

=== Singles ===
Tournament	2012	2013	2014	2015	2016	2017	2018	2019	2020	2021	2022	W–L
Australian Open	A	A	A	A	Q2	Q2	A	Q2	A	A	Q1	0–0
French Open	Q1	Q1	1R	2R	1R	1R	1R	A	Q1	A	A	1–5
Wimbledon	A	A	A	A	Q1	Q1	Q1	Q2	NH	A	A	0–0
US Open	A	A	1R	Q2	Q2	1R	Q1	A	A	Q1	A	0–2
Win–loss	0–0	0–0	0–2	1–1	0–1	0–2	0–1	0–0	0–0	0–0	0–0	1–7

=== Doubles ===
Tournament	2008	2013	2014	2015	2016	2017	2018	2019	2020	2021	2022	W–L
Australian Open	A	A	A	A	A	A	A	A	A	A	A	0–0
French Open	1R	A	1R	2R	1R	1R	1R	1R	1R	1R	A	1–9
Wimbledon	A	A	A	A	A	A	A	A	NH	A	A	0–0
US Open	A	A	A	A	A	A	A	A	A	A	A	0–0
Win–loss	0–1	0–0	0–1	1–1	0–1	0–1	0–1	0–1	0–1	0–1	0–0	1–9

== ITF Circuit finals ==
=== Singles: 16 (6 titles, 10 runner-ups) ===
Legend $50/60,000 tournaments $25,000 tournaments $10,000 tournaments	Finals by surface Hard (4–6) Clay (2–4)

Result	W–L	Date	Tournament	Tier	Surface	Opponent	Score
Loss	0–1	Aug 2010	ITF Tampere, Finland	10,000	Clay	(France) Alizé Lim	4–6, 3–6
Loss	0–2	Jan 2012	ITF Saint Martin, France	10,000	Hard	(United States) Yasmin Schnack	7–6^{(4)}, 2–6, 1–6
Win	1–2	Jan 2012	ITF Le Gosier, France	10,000	Hard	(France) Pauline Payet	7–5, 6–1
Loss	1–3	Aug 2012	ITF Vienna, Austria	10,000	Clay	(Austria) Barbara Haas	1–6, 4–6
Loss	1–4	Dec 2012	ITF Djibouti City	10,000	Hard	(Austria) Melanie Klaffner	6–4, 5–7, 2–6
Loss	1–5	Mar 2013	ITF Netanya, Israel	10,000	Hard	(Belarus) Aliaksandra Sasnovich	2–6, 5–7
Loss	1–6	Sep 2013	ITF Rotterdam, Netherlands	10,000	Clay	(United States) Bernarda Pera	6–1, 3–6, 5–7
Win	2–6	Nov 2013	ITF Équeurdreville, France	25,000	Hard (i)	(Switzerland) Timea Bacsinszky	7–6^{(5)}, 3–6, 6–4
Win	3–6	Dec 2013	ITF Madrid, Spain	25,000	Hard	(Czech Republic) Eva Birnerová	4–6, 6–0, 6–2
Loss	3–7	Oct 2015	ITF Victoria, Mexico	50,000	Hard	(Belgium) Elise Mertens	4–6, 3–6
Loss	3–8	Jun 2017	Internacional de Barcelona, Spain	60,000	Clay	(Chile) Daniela Seguel	6–3, 6–7^{(5)}, 6–7^{(3)}
Loss	3–9	Mar 2018	ITF Gwalior, India	25,000	Hard	(India) Ankita Raina	2–6, 5–7
Win	4–9	Jun 2018	ITF Madrid, Spain	25,000	Clay (i)	(Italy) Martina di Giuseppe	7–6^{(3)}, 4–6, 7–5
Loss	4–10	Nov 2018	Open Nantes Atlantique, France	25,000	Hard (i)	(Switzerland) Timea Bacsinszky	4–6, 6–3, 1–6
Win	5–10	Jun 2021	ITF Madrid, Spain	W25	Hard	(Spain) Jéssica Bouzas Maneiro	4–6, 5–7
Win	6–10	Sep 2021	ITF Saint-Palais-sur-Mer, France	W25	Clay	(Kazakhstan) Anna Danilina	6–3, 6–4

=== Doubles: 23 (8 titles, 15 runner-ups) ===
Legend $100,000 tournaments $80,000 tournaments $50/60,000 tournaments $25,000 tournaments $10/15,000 tournaments	Finals by surface Hard (5–8) Clay (3–7)

Result	W–L	Date	Tournament	Tier	Surface	Partner	Opponents	Score
Loss	0–1	Nov 2009	ITF Le Havre, France	10k	Clay (i)	(France) Alizé Lim	(Romania) Mihaela Buzărnescu (Russia) Marina Melnikova	2–6, 6–7^{(4)}
Loss	0–2	Jun 2010	Open de Montpellier, France	25k	Clay	(Ukraine) Lyudmyla Kichenok	(China) Lu Jingjing (Germany) Laura Siegemund	4–6, 2–6
Loss	0–3	Aug 2010	ITF Tampere, Finland	10k	Clay	(Czech Republic) Monika Tůmová	(Latvia) Irina Kuzmina (Latvia) Diāna Marcinkēviča	4–6, 2–6
Loss	0–4	Jan 2012	ITF Saint Martin, Guadeloupe	10k	Hard	(France) Marion Gaud	(France) Sherazad Benamar (France) Brandy Mina	4–6, 4–6
Loss	0–5	Dec 2012	ITF Djibouti City	10k	Hard	(France) Chloé Paquet	(Ukraine) Diana Bogoliy (Russia) Yana Sizikova	3–6, 6–3, [8–10]
Loss	0–6	Dec 2012	ITF Djibouti City	10k	Hard	(France) Chloé Paquet	(Ukraine) Diana Bogoliy (Russia) Yana Sizikova	7–5, 4–6, [4–10]
Win	1–6	Jul 2013	Contrexéville Open, France	50k	Clay	(Argentina) Vanesa Furlanetto	(Croatia) Ana Konjuh (Croatia) Silvia Njirić	7–6^{(3)}, 6–4
Loss	1–7	Jul 2013	ITF Les Contamines, France	25k	Hard	(Argentina) Vanesa Furlanetto	(Italy) Nicole Clerico (Czech Republic) Nikola Fraňková	6–3, 6–7^{(5)}, [8–10]
Loss	1–8	Aug 2013	ITF Wanfercée-Baulet, Belgium	10k	Clay	(Israel) Deniz Khazaniuk	(Argentina) Tatiana Búa (Chile) Daniela Seguel	4–6, 2–6
Win	2–8	Sep 2013	ITF Rotterdam, Netherlands	10k	Clay	(Netherlands) Demi Schuurs	(Belgium) Elke Lemmens (Belarus) Sviatlana Pirazhenka	3–6, 7–5, [10–4]
Win	3–8	Oct 2014	Open de Touraine, France	50k	Hard (i)	(France) Stéphanie Foretz	(Italy) Alberta Brianti (Italy) Maria Elena Camerin	def.
Loss	3–9	Nov 2014	Open Nantes Atlantique, France	50k+H	Hard (i)	(France) Stéphanie Foretz	(Ukraine) Lyudmyla Kichenok (Ukraine) Nadiia Kichenok	2–6, 3–6
Loss	3–10	Apr 2015	ITF Cairo, Egypt	15k	Clay	(France) Marine Partaud	(Austria) Barbara Haas (Egypt) Sandra Samir	6–0, 4–6, [7–10]
Loss	3–11	Nov 2015	Internationaux de Poitiers, France	100k	Hard (i)	(France) Stéphanie Foretz	(Romania) Andreea Mitu (Romania) Monica Niculescu	7–6^{(5)}, 6–7^{(2)}, [8–10]
Loss	3–12	Oct 2016	ITF Équeurdreville, France	25k	Hard (i)	(Belgium) An-Sophie Mestach	(Sweden) Cornelia Lister (Russia) Polina Monova	5–7, 6–4, [6–10]
Win	4–12	Jul 2017	ITS Cup, Czech Republic	80k+H	Clay	(Mexico) Victoria Rodríguez	(Slovakia) Michaela Hončová (Romania) Raluca Șerban	3–6, 6–2, [10–6]
Loss	4–13	Sep 2019	Zagreb Ladies Open, Croatia	W60+H	Clay	(Chile) Daniela Seguel	(Hungary) Anna Bondár (Argentina) Paula Ormaechea	5–7, 5–7
Win	5–13	Oct 2019	Internationaux de Poitiers, France	W80	Hard (i)	(France) Harmony Tan	(Germany) Tayisiya Morderger (Germany) Yana Morderger	6–4, 6–2
Win	6–13	Feb 2020	Open de l'Isère, France	W25	Hard (i)	(France) Elixane Lechemia	(United Kingdom) Samantha Murray Sharan (Germany) Julia Wachaczyk	6–3, 4–6, [13–11]
Loss	6–14	Jan 2021	ITF Hamburg, Germany	W25	Hard (i)	(Belgium) Kimberley Zimmermann	(Hungary) Anna Bondár (Slovakia) Tereza Mihalíková	4–6, 4–6
Win	7–14	Apr 2021	ITF Calvi, France	W25	Hard	(North Macedonia) Lina Gjorcheska	(France) Audrey Albié (France) Léolia Jeanjean	7–5, 6–4
Loss	7–15	Aug 2021	ITF Collonge-Bellerive, Switzerland	W60	Clay	(Germany) Tatjana Maria	(Russia) Amina Anshba (Russia) Anastasia Gasanova	1–6, 7–6^{(6)}, [8–10]
Win	8–15	Oct 2021	ITF Le Neubourg, France	W80+H	Hard	(United States) Robin Anderson	(France) Estelle Cascino (United Kingdom) Sarah Beth Grey	6–3, 7–6^{(2)}
