= 2025 ITF Women's World Tennis Tour (July–September) =

The 2025 ITF Women's World Tennis Tour is the 2025 edition of the second-tier tour for women's professional tennis. It is organised by the International Tennis Federation and is a tier below the WTA Tour. The ITF Women's World Tennis Tour includes tournaments in five categories with prize money ranging from $15,000 up to $100,000.

== Key ==
Category
W100 tournaments ($100,000)
W75 tournaments ($60,000)
W50 tournaments ($40,000)
W35 tournaments ($30,000)
W15 tournaments ($15,000)

=== July ===
Week of	Tournament	Winner	Runners-up	Semifinalists	Quarterfinalists
July 7	ITF The Hague; The Hague, Netherlands; Clay; W75; Singles and doubles draws	(Ukraine) Oleksandra Oliynykova; 6–1, 6–3	(Italy) Jessica Pieri	(Spain) Guiomar Maristany (Turkey) İpek Öz	(Czech Republic) Laura Samson (France) Jenny Lim (Netherlands) Eva Vedder (Spain) Ariana Geerlings
July 7	ITF The Hague; The Hague, Netherlands; Clay; W75; Singles and doubles draws	(Netherlands) Joy de Zeeuw (Netherlands) Arantxa Rus; 6–2, 6–2	Polina Bakhmutkina; Kristina Kroitor	(Spain) Guiomar Maristany (Turkey) İpek Öz	(Czech Republic) Laura Samson (France) Jenny Lim (Netherlands) Eva Vedder (Spain) Ariana Geerlings
July 7	Corroios, Portugal; Hard; W50; Singles and doubles draws	Vitalia Diatchenko; 6–2, 6–3	(Japan) Aoi Ito	(France) Manon Léonard (Czech Republic) Gabriela Knutson	(Poland) Linda Klimovičová; Ekaterina Ovcharenko (Kazakhstan) Zarina Diyas (Chinese Taipei) Liang En-shuo
July 7	Corroios, Portugal; Hard; W50; Singles and doubles draws	(Hong Kong) Eudice Chong (Chinese Taipei) Liang En-shuo; 6–1, 6–0	(India) Riya Bhatia (Australia) Elena Micic	(France) Manon Léonard (Czech Republic) Gabriela Knutson	(Poland) Linda Klimovičová; Ekaterina Ovcharenko (Kazakhstan) Zarina Diyas (Chinese Taipei) Liang En-shuo
July 7	Aschaffenburg, Germany; Clay; W50; Singles and doubles draws	(Italy) Nuria Brancaccio; 4–6, 6–4, 6–4	(Czech Republic) Nikola Bartůňková	(Georgia (country)) Ekaterine Gorgodze; Maria Timofeeva	(Switzerland) Ylena In-Albon (South Korea) Park So-hyun (Slovenia) Dalila Jakupović (Croatia) Tara Würth
July 7	Aschaffenburg, Germany; Clay; W50; Singles and doubles draws	(United States) Rasheeda McAdoo (Kenya) Angella Okutoyi; 1–6, 6–2, [10–7]	(Germany) Laura Böhner (Switzerland) Chelsea Fontenel	(Georgia (country)) Ekaterine Gorgodze; Maria Timofeeva	(Switzerland) Ylena In-Albon (South Korea) Park So-hyun (Slovenia) Dalila Jakupović (Croatia) Tara Würth
July 7	Don Benito, Spain; Carpet; W35; Singles and doubles draws	(United Kingdom) Katie Swan; 7–6^{(7–5)}, 6–1	(Slovakia) Viktória Hrunčáková	(Germany) Charlotte Keitel (Switzerland) Jenny Dürst	(United Kingdom) Alice Gillan (France) Nahia Berecoechea (Switzerland) Alina Granwehr (Greece) Valentini Grammatikopoulou
July 7	Don Benito, Spain; Carpet; W35; Singles and doubles draws	(Spain) María Martínez Vaquero (Spain) Alba Rey García; 7–5, 6–2	(United Kingdom) Esther Adeshina (United Kingdom) Victoria Allen	(Germany) Charlotte Keitel (Switzerland) Jenny Dürst	(United Kingdom) Alice Gillan (France) Nahia Berecoechea (Switzerland) Alina Granwehr (Greece) Valentini Grammatikopoulou
July 7	Buzău, Romania; Clay; W35; Singles and doubles draws	(Greece) Despina Papamichail; 6–4, 1–0 ret.	(Romania) Patricia Maria Țig	(Greece) Martha Matoula (Romania) Andreea Prisăcariu	(Romania) Elena Ruxandra Bertea (Serbia) Mia Ristić (Poland) Zuzanna Pawlikowska (Romania) Anamaria Oana
July 7	Buzău, Romania; Clay; W35; Singles and doubles draws	(Romania) Elena Ruxandra Bertea; Daria Lodikova; 7–6^{(9–7)}, 6–1	(Japan) Mana Ayukawa (Romania) Briana Szabó	(Greece) Martha Matoula (Romania) Andreea Prisăcariu	(Romania) Elena Ruxandra Bertea (Serbia) Mia Ristić (Poland) Zuzanna Pawlikowska (Romania) Anamaria Oana
July 7	Monastir, Tunisia; Hard; W35; Singles and doubles draws	Anastasia Gasanova; 6–2, 3–6, 6–4	(Japan) Sakura Hosogi	(China) Ren Yufei (Poland) Martyna Kubka	(Egypt) Merna Refaat (Japan) Hiromi Abe (South Korea) Back Da-yeon (China) Lu Jiajing
July 7	Monastir, Tunisia; Hard; W35; Singles and doubles draws	(United Kingdom) Alicia Dudeney (Lithuania) Patricija Paukštytė; 7–6^{(7–5)}, 6–4	(United States) Ashley Lahey (France) Tiphanie Lemaître	(China) Ren Yufei (Poland) Martyna Kubka	(Egypt) Merna Refaat (Japan) Hiromi Abe (South Korea) Back Da-yeon (China) Lu Jiajing
July 7	Hillcrest, South Africa; Hard; W35; Singles and doubles draws	(Netherlands) Stéphanie Visscher; 4–6, 6–3, 6–2	Kira Pavlova	(France) Alyssa Reguer (Zimbabwe) Valeria Bhunu	(Japan) Ayumi Miyamoto (Japan) Michika Ozeki (Sweden) Jacqueline Cabaj Awad; Polina Leykina
July 7	Hillcrest, South Africa; Hard; W35; Singles and doubles draws	(Japan) Ayumi Miyamoto (Japan) Miyu Nakashima; 6–0, 6–3	(Lithuania) Andrė Lukošiūtė (Benin) Gloriana Nahum	(France) Alyssa Reguer (Zimbabwe) Valeria Bhunu	(Japan) Ayumi Miyamoto (Japan) Michika Ozeki (Sweden) Jacqueline Cabaj Awad; Polina Leykina
July 7	Rio Claro, Brazil; Clay; W35; Singles and doubles draws	(Peru) Lucciana Pérez Alarcón; 6–1, 6–2	(Italy) Miriana Tona	(China) You Xiaodi (Argentina) Candela Vasquez	(Argentina) Berta Bonardi (Argentina) Martina Capurro Taborda (Brazil) Luana Plaza Araújo (Argentina) Francesca Mattioli
July 7	Rio Claro, Brazil; Clay; W35; Singles and doubles draws	(China) Dang Yiming (China) You Xiaodi; 6–1, 6–2	(Brazil) Luiza Fullana (Argentina) Carla Markus	(China) You Xiaodi (Argentina) Candela Vasquez	(Argentina) Berta Bonardi (Argentina) Martina Capurro Taborda (Brazil) Luana Plaza Araújo (Argentina) Francesca Mattioli
July 7	Ma'anshan, China; Hard (i); W15; Singles and doubles draws	(China) Yang Yidi; 6–1, 6–1	(China) Huang Yujia	(Slovakia) Viktória Morvayová; Daria Zelinskaya	(China) Yao Xinxin (Sweden) Tiana Tian Deng (China) Wang Jiaqi (China) Wang Jiayi
July 7	Ma'anshan, China; Hard (i); W15; Singles and doubles draws	(South Korea) Im Heerae (South Korea) Kim Na-ri; 6–1, 6–1	(China) Hou Yanan (China) Wang Jiayi	(Slovakia) Viktória Morvayová; Daria Zelinskaya	(China) Yao Xinxin (Sweden) Tiana Tian Deng (China) Wang Jiaqi (China) Wang Jiayi
July 7	Grodzisk Mazowiecki, Poland; Clay; W15; Singles and doubles draws	(Poland) Barbara Kostecka; 5–7, 7–5, 6–4	(Poland) Anna Hertel	(Germany) Karla Bartel (Netherlands) Rikke de Koning	(Poland) Zuzanna Frankowska (Netherlands) Merel Hoedt (Czech Republic) Linda Ševčíková (Ukraine) Daria Yesypchuk
July 7	Grodzisk Mazowiecki, Poland; Clay; W15; Singles and doubles draws	(Slovakia) Salma Drugdová (Czech Republic) Ivana Šebestová; 6–7^{(4–7)}, 7–6^{(8–6)}, [10–3]	(Poland) Barbara Kostecka (Poland) Maja Pawelska	(Germany) Karla Bartel (Netherlands) Rikke de Koning	(Poland) Zuzanna Frankowska (Netherlands) Merel Hoedt (Czech Republic) Linda Ševčíková (Ukraine) Daria Yesypchuk
July 7	Kuršumlijska Banja, Serbia; Clay; W15; Singles and doubles draws	(Serbia) Anja Stanković; 2–6, 6–2, 6–3	(Spain) Berta Passola	Anna Kubareva (Bulgaria) Julia Stamatova	(Italy) Giulia Paterno (Belgium) Tilwith Di Girolami; Eva Kaliadina (Slovakia) Laura Cíleková
July 7	Kuršumlijska Banja, Serbia; Clay; W15; Singles and doubles draws	Anna Kubareva; Milana Zhabrailova; 6–2, 6–7^{(5–7)}, [10–7]	(Serbia) Andjela Lazarević (Serbia) Anja Stanković	Anna Kubareva (Bulgaria) Julia Stamatova	(Italy) Giulia Paterno (Belgium) Tilwith Di Girolami; Eva Kaliadina (Slovakia) Laura Cíleková
July 7	Casablanca, Morocco; Clay; W15; Singles and doubles draws	Ekaterina Reyngold; 6–2, 6–3	(Italy) Jennifer Ruggeri	Victoria Kan (Germany) Joëlle Steur	(France) Océane Babel (Italy) Camilla Gennaro (Morocco) Malak El Allami (Spain) Sara Dols
July 7	Casablanca, Morocco; Clay; W15; Singles and doubles draws	Maria Andrienko (Belgium) Margaux Maquet; 6–1, 6–4	(Italy) Camilla Gennaro (Italy) Jennifer Ruggeri	Victoria Kan (Germany) Joëlle Steur	(France) Océane Babel (Italy) Camilla Gennaro (Morocco) Malak El Allami (Spain) Sara Dols
July 7	Huamantla, Mexico; Hard; W15; Singles and doubles draws	Maria Sholokhova; 6–3, 6–1	(Mexico) Ingrid Carolina Millan Acosta	(United States) Dalayna Hewitt (Mexico) Jéssica Hinojosa Gómez	(Mexico) Natalia Sousa Salazar (United States) Dasha Ivanova (United States) Rachael Smith (Mexico) Paulina Montiel
July 7	Huamantla, Mexico; Hard; W15; Singles and doubles draws	(United States) Dalayna Hewitt (United States) Dasha Ivanova; 7–5, 4–6, [10–7]	(Mexico) Jéssica Hinojosa Gómez (Mexico) María Fernanda Navarro Oliva	(United States) Dalayna Hewitt (Mexico) Jéssica Hinojosa Gómez	(Mexico) Natalia Sousa Salazar (United States) Dasha Ivanova (United States) Rachael Smith (Mexico) Paulina Montiel
July 7	San Diego, United States; Hard; W15; Singles and doubles draws	(United States) Tianmei Wang; 6–4, 6–3	(United States) Kayla Day	(United States) Alyssa Ahn (United States) Christasha McNeil	(United States) Midori Castillo Meza (United Kingdom) Kristina Paskauskas (United States) Ava Markham (Ukraine) Anita Sahdiieva
July 7	San Diego, United States; Hard; W15; Singles and doubles draws	(United States) Kylie Collins (Ukraine) Anita Sahdiieva; 6–4, 6–0	(United States) Midori Castillo Meza (United States) Brandelyn Fulgenzi	(United States) Alyssa Ahn (United States) Christasha McNeil	(United States) Midori Castillo Meza (United Kingdom) Kristina Paskauskas (United States) Ava Markham (Ukraine) Anita Sahdiieva
July 14	Open Araba en Femenino; Vitoria-Gasteiz, Spain; Hard; W75; Singles and doubles draws	(Poland) Linda Klimovičová; 0–6, 7–6^{(7–5)}, 6–0	(Lithuania) Justina Mikulskytė	(United Kingdom) Katie Swan (Ukraine) Daria Snigur	(Italy) Verena Meliss (Spain) Raquel González Vilar (Bulgaria) Isabella Shinikova (China) Guo Hanyu
July 14	Open Araba en Femenino; Vitoria-Gasteiz, Spain; Hard; W75; Singles and doubles draws	(Norway) Malene Helgø (China) Shi Han; 6–3, 6–3	(France) Nahia Berecoechea (Bulgaria) Isabella Shinikova	(United Kingdom) Katie Swan (Ukraine) Daria Snigur	(Italy) Verena Meliss (Spain) Raquel González Vilar (Bulgaria) Isabella Shinikova (China) Guo Hanyu
July 14	ITS Cup; Olomouc, Czech Republic; Clay; W75; Singles and doubles draws	(Mexico) Ana Sofía Sánchez; 7–5, 5–7, 6–3	(Romania) Gabriela Lee	(Serbia) Teodora Kostović (Ukraine) Anastasiia Sobolieva	(Czech Republic) Laura Samson (Turkey) Çağla Büyükakçay (Hungary) Amarissa Tóth (Czech Republic) Petra Sedláčková
July 14	ITS Cup; Olomouc, Czech Republic; Clay; W75; Singles and doubles draws	(Slovenia) Dalila Jakupović (Slovenia) Nika Radišić; 6–4, 6–1	(India) Rutuja Bhosale (China) Zheng Wushuang	(Serbia) Teodora Kostović (Ukraine) Anastasiia Sobolieva	(Czech Republic) Laura Samson (Turkey) Çağla Büyükakçay (Hungary) Amarissa Tóth (Czech Republic) Petra Sedláčková
July 14	Championnats de Granby; Granby, Canada; Hard; W75; Singles and doubles draws	(Australia) Talia Gibson; 6–3, 6–4	(United States) Fiona Crawley	(Canada) Cadence Brace (United States) Haley Giavara	(United States) Victoria Hu (United States) Katrina Scott (Canada) Alexandra Vagramov (United States) Whitney Osuigwe
July 14	Championnats de Granby; Granby, Canada; Hard; W75; Singles and doubles draws	(Canada) Alexandra Vagramov (Czech Republic) Darja Viďmanová; 7–6^{(7–5)}, 6–3	(Japan) Saki Imamura (Japan) Wakana Sonobe	(Canada) Cadence Brace (United States) Haley Giavara	(United States) Victoria Hu (United States) Katrina Scott (Canada) Alexandra Vagramov (United States) Whitney Osuigwe
July 14	Nottingham, United Kingdom; Hard; W50; Singles and doubles draws	(China) Zhang Shuai; 6–4, 6–2	(France) Harmony Tan	(Czech Republic) Vendula Valdmannová (United Kingdom) Ranah Stoiber	(United Kingdom) Amelia Rajecki (Japan) Ayumi Koshiishi (United Kingdom) Lily Miyazaki (Georgia (country)) Mariam Bolkvadze
July 14	Nottingham, United Kingdom; Hard; W50; Singles and doubles draws	(United Kingdom) Victoria Allen (United Kingdom) Amelia Rajecki; 6–4, 4–6, [10–6]	(United Kingdom) Naiktha Bains (United Kingdom) Holly Hutchinson	(Czech Republic) Vendula Valdmannová (United Kingdom) Ranah Stoiber	(United Kingdom) Amelia Rajecki (Japan) Ayumi Koshiishi (United Kingdom) Lily Miyazaki (Georgia (country)) Mariam Bolkvadze
July 14	Darmstadt, Germany; Clay; W35; Singles and doubles draws	(Malta) Francesca Curmi; 6–2, 6–0	(Germany) Josy Daems	(South Korea) Park So-hyun (Sweden) Kajsa Rinaldo Persson	(Spain) Cristina Díaz Adrover (United States) Vivian Wolff (Germany) Eva Bennemann (Germany) Marie Vogt
July 14	Darmstadt, Germany; Clay; W35; Singles and doubles draws	(Switzerland) Chelsea Fontenel (France) Marie Mattel; 6–3, 6–4	(Chile) Fernanda Labraña (Brazil) Rebeca Pereira	(South Korea) Park So-hyun (Sweden) Kajsa Rinaldo Persson	(Spain) Cristina Díaz Adrover (United States) Vivian Wolff (Germany) Eva Bennemann (Germany) Marie Vogt
July 14	Turin, Italy; Clay; W35; Singles and doubles draws	(Spain) Ane Mintegi del Olmo; 6–3, 6–1	(Greece) Valentini Grammatikopoulou	(Italy) Isabella Maria Șerban (Italy) Noemi Basiletti	(Italy) Jennifer Ruggeri (Italy) Enola Chiesa (France) Sara Cakarevic (Sweden) Lisa Zaar
July 14	Turin, Italy; Clay; W35; Singles and doubles draws	(Greece) Valentini Grammatikopoulou (Sweden) Lisa Zaar; 6–3, 7–6^{(7–3)}	(Italy) Noemi Basiletti (Italy) Federica Urgesi	(Italy) Isabella Maria Șerban (Italy) Noemi Basiletti	(Italy) Jennifer Ruggeri (Italy) Enola Chiesa (France) Sara Cakarevic (Sweden) Lisa Zaar
July 14	Monastir, Tunisia; Hard; W35; Singles and doubles draws	(Japan) Sakura Hosogi; 6–3, 6–3	(South Korea) Ku Yeon-woo	(Japan) Rina Saigo (South Korea) Back Da-yeon	(China) Zhu Chenting (China) Lu Jiajing (China) Ren Yufei (United States) Ashley Lahey
July 14	Monastir, Tunisia; Hard; W35; Singles and doubles draws	(South Korea) Back Da-yeon (South Korea) Ku Yeon-woo; 6–3, 6–3	(Japan) Sakura Hosogi (Japan) Misaki Matsuda	(Japan) Rina Saigo (South Korea) Back Da-yeon	(China) Zhu Chenting (China) Lu Jiajing (China) Ren Yufei (United States) Ashley Lahey
July 14	Casablanca, Morocco; Clay; W35; Singles and doubles draws	Anastasia Zolotareva; 7–6^{(7–1)}, 6–4	(Morocco) Yasmine Kabbaj	(Netherlands) Loes Ebeling Koning (Japan) Yuki Naito	(Belgium) Margaux Maquet (Netherlands) Sarah van Emst (France) Mathilde Lollia (France) Emma Léné
July 14	Casablanca, Morocco; Clay; W35; Singles and doubles draws	(Japan) Yuki Naito; Ekaterina Reyngold; 6–7^{(5–7)}, 6–1, [10–3]	(Netherlands) Jasmijn Gimbrère (Poland) Zuzanna Pawlikowska	(Netherlands) Loes Ebeling Koning (Japan) Yuki Naito	(Belgium) Margaux Maquet (Netherlands) Sarah van Emst (France) Mathilde Lollia (France) Emma Léné
July 14	São Paulo, Brazil; Clay; W35; Singles and doubles draws	(Peru) Lucciana Pérez Alarcón; 7–6^{(9–7)}, 6–3	(Argentina) Maria Florencia Urrutia	(Argentina) Julieta Estable (Argentina) Berta Bonardi	(China) You Xiaodi (Brazil) Luiza Fullana (Argentina) Martina Capurro Taborda (China) Dang Yiming
July 14	São Paulo, Brazil; Clay; W35; Singles and doubles draws	(Mexico) Marian Gómez Pezuela Cano (Peru) Lucciana Pérez Alarcón; Walkover	(China) Dang Yiming (China) You Xiaodi	(Argentina) Julieta Estable (Argentina) Berta Bonardi	(China) You Xiaodi (Brazil) Luiza Fullana (Argentina) Martina Capurro Taborda (China) Dang Yiming
July 14	Lu'an, China; Hard; W15; Singles and doubles draws	(China) Guo Meiqi; 4–6, 6–0, 6–4	(United States) Anne Christine Lutkemeyer Obregon	(China) Wang Jiayi; Polina Kuharenko	(South Korea) Choi On-yu (China) Ruan Ziying (China) Yuan Chengyiyi (China) Sun Yingqun
July 14	Lu'an, China; Hard; W15; Singles and doubles draws	(United States) Anne Christine Lutkemeyer Obregon (China) Tian Fangran; 4–6, 7–5, [10–3]	(China) Wang Jiayi (China) Zhang Junhan	(China) Wang Jiayi; Polina Kuharenko	(South Korea) Choi On-yu (China) Ruan Ziying (China) Yuan Chengyiyi (China) Sun Yingqun
July 14	Nakhon Pathom, Thailand; Hard; W15; Singles and doubles draws	(Thailand) Patcharin Cheapchandej; 6–1, 6–3	(Japan) Haruna Arakawa	(Japan) Miho Kuramochi (India) Zeel Desai	(Thailand) Punnin Kovapitukted (Japan) Natsumi Kawaguchi (Japan) Ena Koike (China) Ye Qiuyu
July 14	Nakhon Pathom, Thailand; Hard; W15; Singles and doubles draws	(South Korea) Kim Na-ri (China) Ye Qiuyu; 6–3, 6–2	(Japan) Haruna Arakawa (Japan) Natsumi Kawaguchi	(Japan) Miho Kuramochi (India) Zeel Desai	(Thailand) Punnin Kovapitukted (Japan) Natsumi Kawaguchi (Japan) Ena Koike (China) Ye Qiuyu
July 14	Krško, Slovenia; Clay; W15; Singles and doubles draws	(Germany) Mariella Thamm; 6–4, 6–2	(Slovakia) Irina Balus	(Germany) Eva Marie Voracek (Ukraine) Polina Skliar	(Denmark) Laura Brunkel (Slovakia) Salma Drugdová (Germany) Ida Wobker (Poland) Anna Hertel
July 14	Krško, Slovenia; Clay; W15; Singles and doubles draws	(Slovakia) Salma Drugdová (Belgium) Amélie Van Impe; 6–3, 6–1	(Croatia) Dora Mišković (Netherlands) Antonia Stoyanov	(Germany) Eva Marie Voracek (Ukraine) Polina Skliar	(Denmark) Laura Brunkel (Slovakia) Salma Drugdová (Germany) Ida Wobker (Poland) Anna Hertel
July 14	Kuršumlijska Banja, Serbia; Clay; W15; Singles and doubles draws	(Sweden) Caijsa Hennemann; 7–6^{(7–2)}, 7–5	(Bulgaria) Lidia Encheva	(Serbia) Anja Stanković (Ukraine) Krystyna Pochtovyk	(Serbia) Dušica Popovski (Belgium) Katarina Kujovic (Norway) Astrid Brune Olsen (New Zealand) Valentina Ivanov
July 14	Kuršumlijska Banja, Serbia; Clay; W15; Singles and doubles draws	(New Zealand) Valentina Ivanov (Denmark) Rebecca Munk Mortensen; 6–1, 6–2	(Belgium) Lisa Claeys; Milana Zhabrailova	(Serbia) Anja Stanković (Ukraine) Krystyna Pochtovyk	(Serbia) Dušica Popovski (Belgium) Katarina Kujovic (Norway) Astrid Brune Olsen (New Zealand) Valentina Ivanov
July 14	Hillcrest, South Africa; Hard; W15; Singles and doubles draws	Kira Pavlova; 6–4, 2–6, 6–2	Polina Leykina	(Netherlands) Stéphanie Visscher (South Africa) Jahnie van Zyl	(Japan) Michika Ozeki (Japan) Ayumi Miyamoto (France) Astrid Cirotte (United States) Victoria Mulville
July 14	Hillcrest, South Africa; Hard; W15; Singles and doubles draws	(South Africa) Heike Janse van Vuuren (United States) Victoria Mulville; 6–4, 6–3	(France) Astrid Cirotte (France) Alyssa Réguer	(Netherlands) Stéphanie Visscher (South Africa) Jahnie van Zyl	(Japan) Michika Ozeki (Japan) Ayumi Miyamoto (France) Astrid Cirotte (United States) Victoria Mulville
July 14	Huamantla, Mexico; Hard; W15; Singles and doubles draws	(United States) Dalayna Hewitt; 6–2, 6–2	(United States) Ava Rodriguez	(Norway) Emily Sartz-Lunde; Anna Kartseva	(United States) Sydney Jara; Maria Sholokhova (Mexico) Natalia Sousa Salazar (China) Lan Mi
July 14	Huamantla, Mexico; Hard; W15; Singles and doubles draws	(United States) Kianah Motosono (Colombia) María Camila Torres Murcia; 6–4, 6–4	(United States) Dalayna Hewitt (United States) Dasha Ivanova	(Norway) Emily Sartz-Lunde; Anna Kartseva	(United States) Sydney Jara; Maria Sholokhova (Mexico) Natalia Sousa Salazar (China) Lan Mi
July 21	Figueira da Foz International Ladies Open; Figueira da Foz, Portugal; Hard; W100; Singles and doubles draws	Maria Timofeeva; 6–3, 6–0	Alina Korneeva	(Kazakhstan) Zarina Diyas (Netherlands) Eva Vedder	(Portugal) Francisca Jorge (Thailand) Lanlana Tararudee (Spain) Maria Martínez Vaquero (Belgium) Sofia Costoulas
July 21	Figueira da Foz International Ladies Open; Figueira da Foz, Portugal; Hard; W100; Singles and doubles draws	(Czech Republic) Aneta Laboutková (Lithuania) Justina Mikulskytė; 6–4, 3–6, [10–6]	(Portugal) Francisca Jorge (Portugal) Matilde Jorge	(Kazakhstan) Zarina Diyas (Netherlands) Eva Vedder	(Portugal) Francisca Jorge (Thailand) Lanlana Tararudee (Spain) Maria Martínez Vaquero (Belgium) Sofia Costoulas
July 21	The Women's Hospital Classic; Evansville, United States; Hard; W100; Singles and doubles draws	(United States) Caty McNally; 7–5, 6–4	(Czech Republic) Darja Viďmanová	(China) Wang Xiyu (Netherlands) Arianne Hartono	(China) Yuan Yue (Indonesia) Janice Tjen (Japan) Himeno Sakatsume (Australia) Talia Gibson
July 21	The Women's Hospital Classic; Evansville, United States; Hard; W100; Singles and doubles draws	(Netherlands) Arianne Hartono (India) Prarthana Thombare; 6–3, 6–3	(United States) Ayana Akli (United States) Victoria Osuigwe	(China) Wang Xiyu (Netherlands) Arianne Hartono	(China) Yuan Yue (Indonesia) Janice Tjen (Japan) Himeno Sakatsume (Australia) Talia Gibson
July 21	Horb, Germany; Clay; W35; Singles and doubles draws	(South Korea) Park So-hyun; 6–2, 1–6, 7–6^{(7–4)}	(France) Astrid Lew Yan Foon	(Germany) Tessa Johanna Brockmann (Germany) Noma Noha Akugue	(Germany) Mariella Thamm (Serbia) Mia Ristić (Germany) Nastasja Schunk (Germany) Eva Bennemann
July 21	Horb, Germany; Clay; W35; Singles and doubles draws	(Germany) Tessa Johanna Brockmann (Germany) Josy Daems; 5–7, 6–2, [10–2]	(Argentina) Jazmín Ortenzi (Brazil) Rebeca Pereira	(Germany) Tessa Johanna Brockmann (Germany) Noma Noha Akugue	(Germany) Mariella Thamm (Serbia) Mia Ristić (Germany) Nastasja Schunk (Germany) Eva Bennemann
July 21	Mohammedia, Morocco; Clay; W35; Singles and doubles draws	(Morocco) Yasmine Kabbaj; 6–3, 6–3	(Germany) Carolina Kuhl	Anastasia Zolotareva; Anastasia Tikhonova	(Japan) Rinko Matsuda (Sweden) Lisa Zaar (Netherlands) Britt du Pree (Spain) Ruth Roura Llaverias
July 21	Mohammedia, Morocco; Clay; W35; Singles and doubles draws	Anastasia Tikhonova (Sweden) Lisa Zaar; 6–2, 6–2	(Japan) Rinko Matsuda (Italy) Sofia Rocchetti	Anastasia Zolotareva; Anastasia Tikhonova	(Japan) Rinko Matsuda (Sweden) Lisa Zaar (Netherlands) Britt du Pree (Spain) Ruth Roura Llaverias
July 21	Monastir, Tunisia; Hard; W35; Singles and doubles draws	(South Korea) Back Da-yeon; 6–7^{(4–7)}, 6–1, 7–6^{(9–7)}	(Italy) Arianna Zucchini	(South Korea) Ku Yeon-woo (Finland) Laura Hietaranta	(Japan) Misaki Matsuda (United States) Ashley Lahey (China) Lu Jiajing (France) Tiphanie Lemaître
July 21	Monastir, Tunisia; Hard; W35; Singles and doubles draws	(Australia) Tenika McGiffin (Latvia) Elza Tomase; 3–6, 6–3, [10–8]	(South Korea) Back Da-yeon (India) Vaidehi Chaudhari	(South Korea) Ku Yeon-woo (Finland) Laura Hietaranta	(Japan) Misaki Matsuda (United States) Ashley Lahey (China) Lu Jiajing (France) Tiphanie Lemaître
July 21	Florence, United States; Hard; W35; Singles and doubles draws	(United States) Amelia Honer; 6–3, 7–6^{(7–3)}	(United States) Robin Anderson	(United States) Haley Giavara (China) Xu Shilin	(United States) Usue Maitane Arconada (United States) Eryn Cayetano (United States) Jenna DeFalco (Japan) Mayu Crossley
July 21	Florence, United States; Hard; W35; Singles and doubles draws	(United States) Haley Giavara (Japan) Hiroko Kuwata; 6–0, 6–4	(Venezuela) Sofía Elena Cabezas Domínguez (United States) Kylie Collins	(United States) Haley Giavara (China) Xu Shilin	(United States) Usue Maitane Arconada (United States) Eryn Cayetano (United States) Jenna DeFalco (Japan) Mayu Crossley
July 21	Lu'an, China; Hard; W15; Singles and doubles draws	(China) Zhang Ying; 7–5, 6–3	(South Korea) Choi On-yu	(South Korea) Lee Eun-hye (China) Zhang Junhan	(Chinese Taipei) Lin Yu-chen (China) Guo Meiqi (China) Wang Jiaqi (China) Wei Zhangqian
July 21	Lu'an, China; Hard; W15; Singles and doubles draws	(China) Wang Jiaqi (China) Yuan Chengyiyi; 0–6, 6–1, [10–3]	(China) Han Jiangxue (South Korea) Lee Eun-hye	(South Korea) Lee Eun-hye (China) Zhang Junhan	(Chinese Taipei) Lin Yu-chen (China) Guo Meiqi (China) Wang Jiaqi (China) Wei Zhangqian
July 21	Nakhon Pathom, Thailand; Hard; W15; Singles and doubles draws	(Thailand) Patcharin Cheapchandej; 6–3, 6–1	(Japan) Yuno Kitahara	(Japan) Mio Mushika (Japan) Mao Mushika	(Japan) Miho Kuramochi (Japan) Erika Sema (Japan) Natsumi Kawaguchi (India) Zeel Desai
July 21	Nakhon Pathom, Thailand; Hard; W15; Singles and doubles draws	(South Korea) Kim Na-ri (China) Ye Qiuyu; 6–2, 6–3	(Thailand) Thasaporn Naklo (Thailand) Bunyawi Thamchaiwat	(Japan) Mio Mushika (Japan) Mao Mushika	(Japan) Miho Kuramochi (Japan) Erika Sema (Japan) Natsumi Kawaguchi (India) Zeel Desai
July 21	Las Palmas, Spain; Clay; W15; Singles and doubles draws	(Spain) Ariana Geerlings; 6–4, 6–2	(France) Nahia Berecoechea	(Germany) Angelina Wirges (Italy) Verena Meliss	(Spain) Martina Genís Salas (Italy) Jessica Bertoldo (Netherlands) Demi Tran (Denmark) Emma Kamper
July 21	Las Palmas, Spain; Clay; W15; Singles and doubles draws	(United Kingdom) Victoria Allen (Germany) Angelina Wirges; 6–1, 2–6, [10–6]	(India) Sravya Chilakalapudi (Denmark) Emma Kamper	(Germany) Angelina Wirges (Italy) Verena Meliss	(Spain) Martina Genís Salas (Italy) Jessica Bertoldo (Netherlands) Demi Tran (Denmark) Emma Kamper
July 21	Câmpina, Romania; Clay; W15; Singles and doubles draws	(Romania) Elena Ruxandra Bertea; 6–3, 6–3	(Romania) Ilinca Amariei	(Romania) Carmen Andreea Herea (Romania) Lavinia Tănăsie	(Czech Republic) Linda Ševčíková (Italy) Federica Sacco (Netherlands) Merel Hoedt (Romania) Eva Maria Ionescu
July 21	Câmpina, Romania; Clay; W15; Singles and doubles draws	(Romania) Vanessa Popa Teiuşanu (Romania) Briana Szabó; 6–3, 6–3	(Romania) Alexandra Irina Anghel (Romania) Carmen Andreea Herea	(Romania) Carmen Andreea Herea (Romania) Lavinia Tănăsie	(Czech Republic) Linda Ševčíková (Italy) Federica Sacco (Netherlands) Merel Hoedt (Romania) Eva Maria Ionescu
July 21	Kuršumlijska Banja, Serbia; Clay; W15; Singles and doubles draws	(Serbia) Draginja Vuković; 6–3, 6–2	(Denmark) Rebecca Munk Mortensen	Milana Zhabrailova (Austria) Ekaterina Perelygina	(France) Helena Stevic (Liechtenstein) Sylvie Zünd (Belgium) Tamila Gadamauri (Bosnia and Herzegovina) Sara Mikača
July 21	Kuršumlijska Banja, Serbia; Clay; W15; Singles and doubles draws	(Greece) Marianne Argyrokastriti (Norway) Astrid Brune Olsen; 6–2, 1–6, [10–4]	(Switzerland) Kiara Cvetkovic (Serbia) Anja Stanković	Milana Zhabrailova (Austria) Ekaterina Perelygina	(France) Helena Stevic (Liechtenstein) Sylvie Zünd (Belgium) Tamila Gadamauri (Bosnia and Herzegovina) Sara Mikača
July 21	Huamantla, Mexico; Hard; W15; Singles and doubles draws	(Mexico) María Fernanda Navarro Oliva; 6–7^{(1–7)}, 6–2, 6–4	Maria Sholokhova	(United States) Abigail Rencheli (United States) Misa Malkin	(Argentina) Lourdes Ayala (Canada) Ana Grubor (Mexico) Jéssica Hinojosa Gómez (United States) Dasha Ivanova
July 21	Huamantla, Mexico; Hard; W15; Singles and doubles draws	(Mexico) Sabastiani Leon; Maria Sholokhova; 6–2, 6–2	(Mexico) Jéssica Hinojosa Gómez (Mexico) María Fernanda Navarro Oliva	(United States) Abigail Rencheli (United States) Misa Malkin	(Argentina) Lourdes Ayala (Canada) Ana Grubor (Mexico) Jéssica Hinojosa Gómez (United States) Dasha Ivanova
July 28	ITF World Tennis Tour Gran Canaria; Maspalomas, Spain; Clay; W100; Singles and doubles draws	(Spain) Kaitlin Quevedo; 4–6, 6–2, 6–4	(Netherlands) Arantxa Rus	(Germany) Caroline Werner; Ekaterina Ovcharenko	(Spain) Aliona Bolsova (Lithuania) Justina Mikulskytė (Spain) Ariana Geerlings (Spain) Lucía Cortez Llorca
July 28	ITF World Tennis Tour Gran Canaria; Maspalomas, Spain; Clay; W100; Singles and doubles draws	(Belgium) Magali Kempen (Czech Republic) Anna Sisková; 6–2, 6–3	(United Kingdom) Madeleine Brooks (Hong Kong) Eudice Chong	(Germany) Caroline Werner; Ekaterina Ovcharenko	(Spain) Aliona Bolsova (Lithuania) Justina Mikulskytė (Spain) Ariana Geerlings (Spain) Lucía Cortez Llorca
July 28	Ladies Open Hechingen; Hechingen, Germany; Clay; W75; Singles and doubles draws	(Czech Republic) Nikola Bartůňková; 7–5, 6–2	(Austria) Julia Grabher	(Austria) Sinja Kraus (Belgium) Hanne Vandewinkel	(Switzerland) Ylena In-Albon (Croatia) Lea Bošković (Spain) Ángela Fita Boluda; Elena Pridankina
July 28	Ladies Open Hechingen; Hechingen, Germany; Clay; W75; Singles and doubles draws	(Slovakia) Renáta Jamrichová; Elena Pridankina; 6–2, 6–2	(China) Feng Shuo (China) Li Zongyu	(Austria) Sinja Kraus (Belgium) Hanne Vandewinkel	(Switzerland) Ylena In-Albon (Croatia) Lea Bošković (Spain) Ángela Fita Boluda; Elena Pridankina
July 28	Internazionali di Tennis del Friuli Venezia Giulia; Cordenons, Italy; Clay; W75; Singles and doubles draws	(Italy) Nuria Brancaccio; 6–2, 6–1	(Slovenia) Veronika Erjavec	(Italy) Noemi Basiletti (Slovenia) Tamara Zidanšek	(Turkey) Çağla Büyükakçay (Italy) Federica Urgesi (Italy) Dalila Spiteri (France) Carole Monnet
July 28	Internazionali di Tennis del Friuli Venezia Giulia; Cordenons, Italy; Clay; W75; Singles and doubles draws	(Chinese Taipei) Liang En-shuo (Thailand) Peangtarn Plipuech; 6–4, 6–2	(Czech Republic) Karolína Kubáňová (Czech Republic) Aneta Laboutková	(Italy) Noemi Basiletti (Slovenia) Tamara Zidanšek	(Turkey) Çağla Büyükakçay (Italy) Federica Urgesi (Italy) Dalila Spiteri (France) Carole Monnet
July 28	Lexington Challenger; Lexington, United States; Hard; W75; Singles and doubles draws	(China) Wang Xiyu; 3–6, 6–2, 6–4	(Indonesia) Janice Tjen	(United States) Fiona Crawley (United States) Varvara Lepchenko	(United States) Kayla Day (France) Jessika Ponchet (United States) Victoria Hu (United States) Lea Ma
July 28	Lexington Challenger; Lexington, United States; Hard; W75; Singles and doubles draws	(United States) Ayana Akli (United States) Eryn Cayetano; 4–6, 6–2, [10–4]	(United States) Elvina Kalieva (United States) Alana Smith	(United States) Fiona Crawley (United States) Varvara Lepchenko	(United States) Kayla Day (France) Jessika Ponchet (United States) Victoria Hu (United States) Lea Ma
July 28	Nakhon Pathom, Thailand; Hard; W35; Singles and doubles draws	(Thailand) Punnin Kovapitukted; 3–6, 7–6^{(7–4)}, 6–1	(Thailand) Patcharin Cheapchandej	(China) Tian Fangran (Japan) Yuno Kitahara	(Japan) Miho Kuramochi (Slovakia) Viktória Morvayová; Kira Pavlova (China) Lu Jiajing
July 28	Nakhon Pathom, Thailand; Hard; W35; Singles and doubles draws	(South Korea) Kim Na-ri (China) Ye Qiuyu; 6–4, 4–6, [10–5]	(Thailand) Salakthip Ounmuang (Thailand) Kamonwan Yodpetch	(China) Tian Fangran (Japan) Yuno Kitahara	(Japan) Miho Kuramochi (Slovakia) Viktória Morvayová; Kira Pavlova (China) Lu Jiajing
July 28	Roehampton, United Kingdom; Hard; W35; Singles and doubles draws	(Belgium) Jeline Vandromme; 7–6^{(7–4)}, 5–7, 7–5	(China) Shi Han	(France) Harmony Tan (United Kingdom) Lily Miyazaki	(United States) Carol Young Suh Lee (United Kingdom) Katy Dunne (United Kingdom) Indianna Spink (United Kingdom) Naiktha Bains
July 28	Roehampton, United Kingdom; Hard; W35; Singles and doubles draws	(United Kingdom) Alicia Dudeney (United Kingdom) Amelia Rajecki; 6–1, 6–4	(Japan) Rinko Matsuda (Japan) Eri Shimizu	(France) Harmony Tan (United Kingdom) Lily Miyazaki	(United States) Carol Young Suh Lee (United Kingdom) Katy Dunne (United Kingdom) Indianna Spink (United Kingdom) Naiktha Bains
July 28	Knokke-Heist, Belgium; Clay; W35; Singles and doubles draws	(Greece) Despina Papamichail; 6–1, 6–2	(Netherlands) Anouck Vrancken Peeters	(France) Yara Bartashevich (Netherlands) Isis Louise van den Broek	(Italy) Anastasia Abbagnato (Croatia) Lucija Ćirić Bagarić (Netherlands) Loes Ebeling Koning (Finland) Laura Hietaranta
July 28	Knokke-Heist, Belgium; Clay; W35; Singles and doubles draws	(Italy) Anastasia Abbagnato (Greece) Despina Papamichail; 7–5, 6–1	(France) Yara Bartashevich (Netherlands) Sarah van Emst	(France) Yara Bartashevich (Netherlands) Isis Louise van den Broek	(Italy) Anastasia Abbagnato (Croatia) Lucija Ćirić Bagarić (Netherlands) Loes Ebeling Koning (Finland) Laura Hietaranta
July 28	Pergamino, Argentina; Clay; W35; Singles and doubles draws	(Argentina) Luisina Giovannini; 6–3, 6–1	(Peru) Dana Guzmán	(Argentina) Maria Florencia Urrutia (Argentina) Luciana Moyano	(Brazil) Luiza Fullana (Argentina) Carla Markus (Chile) Fernanda Labraña (Argentina) Julieta Estable
July 28	Pergamino, Argentina; Clay; W35; Singles and doubles draws	(Argentina) Martina Capurro Taborda (Argentina) Julia Riera; 6–4, 6–2	(Argentina) Luisina Giovannini (Mexico) Marian Gómez Pezuela Cano	(Argentina) Maria Florencia Urrutia (Argentina) Luciana Moyano	(Brazil) Luiza Fullana (Argentina) Carla Markus (Chile) Fernanda Labraña (Argentina) Julieta Estable
July 28	Lu'an, China; Hard; W15; Singles and doubles draws	(China) Guo Meiqi; 6–0, 6–2	(China) Chen Mengyi	(China) Zhang Ying (Japan) Naho Sato	Arina Arifullina (China) Han Jiangxue (China) Wang Jiayi; Maria Kalyakina
July 28	Lu'an, China; Hard; W15; Singles and doubles draws	(China) Huang Yujia (China) Zhang Ying; 6–4, 6–3	(China) Sun Yifan (China) Zhao Xichen	(China) Zhang Ying (Japan) Naho Sato	Arina Arifullina (China) Han Jiangxue (China) Wang Jiayi; Maria Kalyakina
July 28	Dublin, Ireland; Carpet; W15; Singles and doubles draws	(Germany) Ida Wobker; 6–2, 6–7^{(5–7)}, 6–1	(United Kingdom) Victoria Allen	(Netherlands) Coco Bosman (United Kingdom) Esther Adeshina	(France) Astrid Cirotte (France) Chloé Noël (United Kingdom) Emma Wilson (Germany) Anja Wildgruber
July 28	Dublin, Ireland; Carpet; W15; Singles and doubles draws	(United Kingdom) Esther Adeshina (United Kingdom) Victoria Allen; 7–5, 6–3	(France) Astrid Cirotte (France) Chloé Noël	(Netherlands) Coco Bosman (United Kingdom) Esther Adeshina	(France) Astrid Cirotte (France) Chloé Noël (United Kingdom) Emma Wilson (Germany) Anja Wildgruber
July 28	Rogaška Slatina, Slovenia; Clay; W15; Singles and doubles draws	(Italy) Isabella Maria Şerban; 4–6, 6–2, 7–5	(Germany) Eva Marie Voracek	(Slovakia) Katarína Kužmová (Poland) Daria Kuczer	(Liechtenstein) Sylvie Zünd (Greece) Valentini Grammatikopoulou (Hungary) Adrienn Nagy (Slovakia) Salma Drugdová
July 28	Rogaška Slatina, Slovenia; Clay; W15; Singles and doubles draws	(Slovakia) Salma Drugdová (Poland) Daria Kuczer; 6–2, 3–1 ret.	(Slovakia) Laura Cíleková (Slovakia) Natália Kročková	(Slovakia) Katarína Kužmová (Poland) Daria Kuczer	(Liechtenstein) Sylvie Zünd (Greece) Valentini Grammatikopoulou (Hungary) Adrienn Nagy (Slovakia) Salma Drugdová
July 28	Savitaipale, Finland; Clay; W15; Singles and doubles draws	(Poland) Marcelina Podlińska; 6–3, 6–4	(Poland) Anna Hertel	(Argentina) Agustina Chlpac (Germany) Johanna Silva	(Germany) Franziska Sziedat (Norway) Astrid Brune Olsen (Netherlands) Madelief Hageman (Germany) Sina Herrmann
July 28	Savitaipale, Finland; Clay; W15; Singles and doubles draws	(Finland) Clarissa Blomqvist (Ukraine) Daria Yesypchuk; 6–4, 6–4	(Italy) Emma Ottavia Ghirardato (Denmark) Emma Kamper	(Argentina) Agustina Chlpac (Germany) Johanna Silva	(Germany) Franziska Sziedat (Norway) Astrid Brune Olsen (Netherlands) Madelief Hageman (Germany) Sina Herrmann
July 28	Cluj-Napoca, Romania; Clay; W15; Singles and doubles draws	(Romania) Ilinca Amariei; 7–5, 2–6, 6–4	(Romania) Patricia Maria Țig	(Czech Republic) Linda Ševčíková (Romania) Lavinia Tănăsie	(Italy) Angelica Raggi (Romania) Bianca Bărbulescu (Romania) Simona Ogescu (Romania) Alesia Breaz
July 28	Cluj-Napoca, Romania; Clay; W15; Singles and doubles draws	(Romania) Oana Gavrilă (Czech Republic) Linda Ševčíková; Walkover	(Romania) Lavinia Tănăsie (Romania) Patricia Maria Țig	(Czech Republic) Linda Ševčíková (Romania) Lavinia Tănăsie	(Italy) Angelica Raggi (Romania) Bianca Bărbulescu (Romania) Simona Ogescu (Romania) Alesia Breaz
July 28	Kuršumlijska Banja, Serbia; Clay; W15; Singles and doubles draws	Alexandra Shubladze; 6–1, 6–4	(Denmark) Rebecca Munk Mortensen	(Bulgaria) Denislava Glushkova (Bosnia and Herzegovina) Sara Mikača	(China) Lin Yujun (Slovakia) Laura Svatíková; Sofya Lansere (Germany) Helena Buchwald
July 28	Kuršumlijska Banja, Serbia; Clay; W15; Singles and doubles draws	Sofya Lansere; Alexandra Shubladze; 6–1, 6–2	Ekaterina Agureeva (Moldova) Eva Zabolotnaia	(Bulgaria) Denislava Glushkova (Bosnia and Herzegovina) Sara Mikača	(China) Lin Yujun (Slovakia) Laura Svatíková; Sofya Lansere (Germany) Helena Buchwald
July 28	Monastir, Tunisia; Hard; W15; Singles and doubles draws	(Latvia) Beatrise Zeltiņa; 6–3, 6–2	(Zimbabwe) Valeria Bhunu	(Hong Kong) Adithya Karunaratne (France) Louna Zoppas	(United States) Julia Adams (United States) Jenna DeFalco (China) Zhu Chenting (France) Alyssa Reguer
July 28	Monastir, Tunisia; Hard; W15; Singles and doubles draws	(France) Alyssa Reguer (China) Zhu Chenting; 6–2, 7–6^{(7–5)}	(United Kingdom) Amelia Bissett (France) Laïa Petretic	(Hong Kong) Adithya Karunaratne (France) Louna Zoppas	(United States) Julia Adams (United States) Jenna DeFalco (China) Zhu Chenting (France) Alyssa Reguer
July 28	Huamantla, Mexico; Hard; W15; Singles and doubles draws	Maria Sholokhova; 6–4, 1–6, 6–4	(Mexico) María Fernanda Navarro Oliva	(Canada) Ana Grubor (China) Lan Mi	(Canada) Raphaelle Leroux (Colombia) María Torres Murcia (Mexico) Jessica Hinojosa Gómez (Mexico) Ingrid Carolina Millan Acosta
July 28	Huamantla, Mexico; Hard; W15; Singles and doubles draws	(Mexico) Sabastiani Leon; Maria Sholokhova; 7–6^{(7–2)}, 6–0	(United States) Kyle McPhillips (Mexico) Amanda Carolina Nava Elkin	(Canada) Ana Grubor (China) Lan Mi	(Canada) Raphaelle Leroux (Colombia) María Torres Murcia (Mexico) Jessica Hinojosa Gómez (Mexico) Ingrid Carolina Millan Acosta

=== August ===
Week of	Tournament	Winner	Runners-up	Semifinalists	Quarterfinalists
August 4	Koser Jewelers Tennis Challenge; Landisville, United States; Hard; W100; Singles – Doubles	(Croatia) Petra Marčinko; 7–6^{(7–4)}, 3–6, 6–4	(Indonesia) Janice Tjen	(United States) Ayana Akli (France) Jessika Ponchet	(United States) Mary Stoiana; Iryna Shymanovich (United States) Elvina Kalieva (Thailand) Lanlana Tararudee
August 4	Koser Jewelers Tennis Challenge; Landisville, United States; Hard; W100; Singles – Doubles	(United States) Carmen Corley (United States) Ivana Corley; 4–6, 7–6^{(7–4)}, [12–10]	(Brazil) Ingrid Martins (Switzerland) Simona Waltert	(United States) Ayana Akli (France) Jessika Ponchet	(United States) Mary Stoiana; Iryna Shymanovich (United States) Elvina Kalieva (Thailand) Lanlana Tararudee
August 4	Ladies Open Amstetten; Amstetten, Austria; Clay; W75; Singles and doubles draws	(Austria) Sinja Kraus; 6–2, 6–4	(Austria) Lilli Tagger	(Austria) Julia Grabher (Slovakia) Renáta Jamrichová	(Czech Republic) Nikola Bartůňková (Germany) Tamara Korpatsch (India) Riya Bhatia (Sweden) Lisa Zaar
August 4	Ladies Open Amstetten; Amstetten, Austria; Clay; W75; Singles and doubles draws	(China) Feng Shuo (Chinese Taipei) Liang En-shuo; 4–6, 6–4, [10–0]	(Slovenia) Dalila Jakupović (Slovenia) Nika Radišić	(Austria) Julia Grabher (Slovakia) Renáta Jamrichová	(Czech Republic) Nikola Bartůňková (Germany) Tamara Korpatsch (India) Riya Bhatia (Sweden) Lisa Zaar
August 4	Ourense, Spain; Hard; W50; Singles and doubles draws	Polina Iatcenko; 6–2, 6–2	(United States) Carol Young Suh Lee	(Czech Republic) Gabriela Knutson (Slovenia) Polona Hercog	(Spain) Eva Guerrero Álvarez (Spain) Guiomar Maristany (Spain) María Martínez Vaquero (Czech Republic) Vendula Valdmannová
August 4	Ourense, Spain; Hard; W50; Singles and doubles draws	(Japan) Momoko Kobori (Japan) Ayano Shimizu; 6–4, 6–1	(Spain) María Martínez Vaquero (Spain) Alba Rey García	(Czech Republic) Gabriela Knutson (Slovenia) Polona Hercog	(Spain) Eva Guerrero Álvarez (Spain) Guiomar Maristany (Spain) María Martínez Vaquero (Czech Republic) Vendula Valdmannová
August 4	Koksijde, Belgium; Clay; W50+H; Singles and doubles draws	(Japan) Ikumi Yamazaki; 6–1, 6–4	(Netherlands) Anouk Koevermans	(Italy) Lisa Pigato (Brazil) Gabriela Cé	(Malta) Francesca Curmi (Italy) Anastasia Abbagnato (Spain) Cristina Díaz Adrover (Indonesia) Priska Nugroho
August 4	Koksijde, Belgium; Clay; W50+H; Singles and doubles draws	(Belgium) Magali Kempen (Czech Republic) Anna Sisková; 7–6^{(7–5)}, 5–7, [10–6]	(Italy) Anastasia Abbagnato (Croatia) Mariana Dražić	(Italy) Lisa Pigato (Brazil) Gabriela Cé	(Malta) Francesca Curmi (Italy) Anastasia Abbagnato (Spain) Cristina Díaz Adrover (Indonesia) Priska Nugroho
August 4	Leipzig, Germany; Clay; W50+H; Singles and doubles draws	Alisa Oktiabreva; 6–4, 6–2	(Germany) Tessa Johanna Brockmann	(Switzerland) Susan Bandecchi; Julia Avdeeva	(Italy) Giorgia Pedone (Czech Republic) Aneta Kučmová (Japan) Sara Saito (Germany) Noma Noha Akugue
August 4	Leipzig, Germany; Clay; W50+H; Singles and doubles draws	(South Korea) Park So-hyun (Thailand) Peangtarn Plipuech; 6–1, 6–4	(Germany) Lola Giza (Bulgaria) Isabella Shinikova	(Switzerland) Susan Bandecchi; Julia Avdeeva	(Italy) Giorgia Pedone (Czech Republic) Aneta Kučmová (Japan) Sara Saito (Germany) Noma Noha Akugue
August 4	Roehampton, United Kingdom; Hard; W35; Singles and doubles draws	(United Kingdom) Alicia Dudeney; 6–1, 6–4	(United Kingdom) Hannah Klugman	(South Korea) Ku Yeon-woo (Japan) Hiromi Abe	(France) Tiantsoa Rakotomanga Rajaonah (United Kingdom) Victoria Allen (United Kingdom) Amelia Rajecki (Japan) Hayu Kinoshita
August 4	Roehampton, United Kingdom; Hard; W35; Singles and doubles draws	(United Kingdom) Naiktha Bains (India) Rutuja Bhosale; 4–6, 6–1, [12–10]	(United States) Mary Lewis (United States) Brandy Walker	(South Korea) Ku Yeon-woo (Japan) Hiromi Abe	(France) Tiantsoa Rakotomanga Rajaonah (United Kingdom) Victoria Allen (United Kingdom) Amelia Rajecki (Japan) Hayu Kinoshita
August 4	Kuršumlijska Banja, Serbia; Clay; W35; Singles and doubles draws	(Romania) Miriam Bulgaru; 5–7, 6–1, 6–0	(North Macedonia) Lina Gjorcheska	(Bulgaria) Denislava Glushkova; Darya Astakhova	(Serbia) Mia Ristić; Sofya Lansere (Kazakhstan) Zhibek Kulambayeva; Ksenia Zaytseva
August 4	Kuršumlijska Banja, Serbia; Clay; W35; Singles and doubles draws	Alexandra Shubladze; Ksenia Zaytseva; 6–2, 6–1	(Germany) Katharina Hobgarski (Greece) Martha Matoula	(Bulgaria) Denislava Glushkova; Darya Astakhova	(Serbia) Mia Ristić; Sofya Lansere (Kazakhstan) Zhibek Kulambayeva; Ksenia Zaytseva
August 4	Chacabuco, Argentina; Clay; W35; Singles and doubles draws	(Argentina) Luisina Giovannini; 6–7^{(5–7)}, 6–3, 6–3	(Peru) Dana Guzmán	(Peru) Lucciana Pérez Alarcón (Argentina) Victoria Bosio	(Argentina) Francesca Mattioli (Brazil) Luiza Fullana (Argentina) Justina María González Daniele (Chile) Jimar Gerald González
August 4	Chacabuco, Argentina; Clay; W35; Singles and doubles draws	(Argentina) Luisina Giovannini (Mexico) Marian Gómez Pezuela Cano; 3–6, 7–6^{(9–7)}, [10–5]	(Brazil) Ana Candiotto (Argentina) Justina María González Daniele	(Peru) Lucciana Pérez Alarcón (Argentina) Victoria Bosio	(Argentina) Francesca Mattioli (Brazil) Luiza Fullana (Argentina) Justina María González Daniele (Chile) Jimar Gerald González
August 4	Southaven, United States; Hard; W35; Singles and doubles draws	(United States) Kayla Day; 6–4, 6–1	(Mexico) Ana Sofía Sánchez	(Mexico) Victoria Rodríguez (United States) Malaika Rapolu	(United States) Valeria Ray (Canada) Cadence Brace (China) You Xiaodi (United Kingdom) Katie Swan
August 4	Southaven, United States; Hard; W35; Singles and doubles draws	(United States) Catherine Harrison (United States) Ashley Lahey; 6–3, 6–2	(Japan) Hiroko Kuwata (Japan) Kyōka Okamura	(Mexico) Victoria Rodríguez (United States) Malaika Rapolu	(United States) Valeria Ray (Canada) Cadence Brace (China) You Xiaodi (United Kingdom) Katie Swan
August 4	Tweed Heads, Australia; Hard; W15; Singles and doubles draws	(Australia) Giselle Isabella Guillen; 6–3, 1–6, 6–4	(Australia) Catherine Aulia	(Australia) Charlotte Kempenaers-Pocz (Japan) Yuno Kitahara	(South Korea) Moon Jeong (Australia) Kimiko Cooper (Australia) Nithesa Selvaraj (Australia) Alicia Smith
August 4	Tweed Heads, Australia; Hard; W15; Singles and doubles draws	(Australia) Catherine Aulia (Australia) Lily Fairclough; 2–6, 6–4, [11–9]	(New Zealand) Monique Barry (Australia) Gabriella Da Silva-Fick	(Australia) Charlotte Kempenaers-Pocz (Japan) Yuno Kitahara	(South Korea) Moon Jeong (Australia) Kimiko Cooper (Australia) Nithesa Selvaraj (Australia) Alicia Smith
August 4	Singapore, Singapore; Hard (i); W15; Singles and doubles draws	(Japan) Haruna Arakawa; 6–4, 6–0	(South Korea) Cherry Kim	(Japan) Hikaru Sato (Japan) Erika Sema	(Colombia) María Herazo González (Japan) Natsumi Kawaguchi; Elina Nepliy (China) Guo Meiqi
August 4	Singapore, Singapore; Hard (i); W15; Singles and doubles draws	(Japan) Haruna Arakawa (Japan) Natsumi Kawaguchi; 6–2, 6–2	(Japan) Natsuho Arakawa (Japan) Anri Nagata	(Japan) Hikaru Sato (Japan) Erika Sema	(Colombia) María Herazo González (Japan) Natsumi Kawaguchi; Elina Nepliy (China) Guo Meiqi
August 4	Lu'an, China; Hard; W15; Singles and doubles draws	(Slovakia) Viktória Morvayová; 2–6, 6–2, 6–1	(China) Sun Yingqun	(Japan) Reina Goto (China) Huang Yujia	(China) Wang Jiaqi (Chinese Taipei) Lin Fang-an (China) Chen Mengyi (China) Zhang Junhan
August 4	Lu'an, China; Hard; W15; Singles and doubles draws	(China) Huang Yujia (China) Xiao Zhenghua; 6–1, 6–4	(China) Wang Jiaqi (China) Yuan Chengyiyi	(Japan) Reina Goto (China) Huang Yujia	(China) Wang Jiaqi (Chinese Taipei) Lin Fang-an (China) Chen Mengyi (China) Zhang Junhan
August 4	Astana, Kazakhstan; Hard; W15; Singles and doubles draws	Ekaterina Maklakova; 6–4, 2–6, 6–4	Edda Mamedova	(Kazakhstan) Aruzhan Sagandykova; Ekaterina Khayrutdinova	Vlada Zvereva; Victoria Milovanova (Kazakhstan) Ingkar Dyussebay (India) Anjali Rathi
August 4	Astana, Kazakhstan; Hard; W15; Singles and doubles draws	(Kazakhstan) Asylzhan Arystanbekova (Kazakhstan) Ingkar Dyussebay; 6–7^{(3–7)}, 6–4, [10–3]	Ekaterina Khayrutdinova; Anna Kubareva	(Kazakhstan) Aruzhan Sagandykova; Ekaterina Khayrutdinova	Vlada Zvereva; Victoria Milovanova (Kazakhstan) Ingkar Dyussebay (India) Anjali Rathi
August 4	Hämeenlinna, Finland; Clay; W15; Singles and doubles draws	(Finland) Laura Hietaranta; 6–1, 6–0	(Finland) Ella Haavisto	(Denmark) Emma Kamper (Ukraine) Daria Yesypchuk	(Argentina) Agustina Chlpac (Netherlands) Madelief Hageman (Germany) Sina Herrmann (Slovakia) Victoria Chramcová
August 4	Hämeenlinna, Finland; Clay; W15; Singles and doubles draws	(Sweden) June Björk (Denmark) Emma Kamper; 6–2, 4–6, [10–7]	(Finland) Ella Haavisto (Finland) Stella Remander	(Denmark) Emma Kamper (Ukraine) Daria Yesypchuk	(Argentina) Agustina Chlpac (Netherlands) Madelief Hageman (Germany) Sina Herrmann (Slovakia) Victoria Chramcová
August 4	Bielsko-Biała, Poland; Clay; W15; Singles and doubles draws	(Poland) Marcelina Podlińska; 6–1, 6–3	(Czech Republic) Lucie Urbanová	(Czech Republic) Julie Paštiková (Poland) Anna Hertel	(Slovakia) Katarína Kužmová (Netherlands) Merel Hoedt (Poland) Amelia Paszun (Poland) Katarzyna Wysoczańska
August 4	Bielsko-Biała, Poland; Clay; W15; Singles and doubles draws	(Poland) Daria Gorska (Czech Republic) Emma Slavíková; 7–6^{(8–6)}, 4–6, [10–4]	(Netherlands) Merel Hoedt (Germany) Angelina Wirges	(Czech Republic) Julie Paštiková (Poland) Anna Hertel	(Slovakia) Katarína Kužmová (Netherlands) Merel Hoedt (Poland) Amelia Paszun (Poland) Katarzyna Wysoczańska
August 4	Slovenske Konjice, Slovenia; Clay; W15; Singles and doubles draws	(Germany) Eva Marie Voracek; 5–7, 6–3, 6–1	(Czech Republic) Alena Kovačková	Alexandra Vasilyeva (Germany) Anja Wildgruber	(Liechtenstein) Sylvie Zünd (Slovakia) Salma Drugdová (Slovenia) Petja Drame (Italy) Isabella Maria Șerban
August 4	Slovenske Konjice, Slovenia; Clay; W15; Singles and doubles draws	(Slovakia) Salma Drugdová (Czech Republic) Magdaléna Smékalová; 7–5, 2–6, [13–11]	(Italy) Maddalena Giordano (Slovenia) Lara Smejkal	Alexandra Vasilyeva (Germany) Anja Wildgruber	(Liechtenstein) Sylvie Zünd (Slovakia) Salma Drugdová (Slovenia) Petja Drame (Italy) Isabella Maria Șerban
August 4	Brașov, Romania; Clay; W15; Singles and doubles draws	(Romania) Elena Ruxandra Bertea; 6–1, 6–3	(Romania) Bianca Bărbulescu	(Italy) Jennifer Ruggeri (Bulgaria) Lidia Encheva	(Romania) Eva Maria Ionescu (Italy) Angelica Raggi (Spain) Sara Dols (Romania) Briana Szabó
August 4	Brașov, Romania; Clay; W15; Singles and doubles draws	(Romania) Alexandra Irina Anghel (Romania) Carmen Andreea Herea; 6–3, 6–2	(Italy) Angelica Raggi (Italy) Jennifer Ruggeri	(Italy) Jennifer Ruggeri (Bulgaria) Lidia Encheva	(Romania) Eva Maria Ionescu (Italy) Angelica Raggi (Spain) Sara Dols (Romania) Briana Szabó
August 4	Monastir, Tunisia; Hard; W15; Singles and doubles draws	(Belgium) Jeline Vandromme; 6–3, 6–1	(Latvia) Beatrise Zeltiņa	(France) Jenny Lim (China) Jialin Tian	(Zimbabwe) Valeria Bhunu (Hong Kong) Adithya Karunaratne (Japan) Kanon Sawashiro (Latvia) Elza Tomase
August 4	Monastir, Tunisia; Hard; W15; Singles and doubles draws	(Australia) Tenika McGiffin (Latvia) Elza Tomase; 6–2, 6–1	(Italy) Martina Lo Pumo (Canada) Anna Tabunshchyk	(France) Jenny Lim (China) Jialin Tian	(Zimbabwe) Valeria Bhunu (Hong Kong) Adithya Karunaratne (Japan) Kanon Sawashiro (Latvia) Elza Tomase
August 11	Serbian Tennis Tour; Kuršumlijska Banja, Serbia; Clay; W75; Singles and doubles draws	(Serbia) Teodora Kostović; 7–5, 6–3	(North Macedonia) Lina Gjorcheska	(Cyprus) Raluca Șerban (Serbia) Anja Stanković	(France) Séléna Janicijevic (Italy) Aurora Zantedeschi (Serbia) Mia Ristić; Sofya Lansere
August 11	Serbian Tennis Tour; Kuršumlijska Banja, Serbia; Clay; W75; Singles and doubles draws	(Serbia) Natalija Senić (Serbia) Anja Stanković; 6–2, 7–5	(Portugal) Francisca Jorge (Portugal) Matilde Jorge	(Cyprus) Raluca Șerban (Serbia) Anja Stanković	(France) Séléna Janicijevic (Italy) Aurora Zantedeschi (Serbia) Mia Ristić; Sofya Lansere
August 11	Saskatoon Challenger; Saskatoon, Canada; Hard; W50; Singles and doubles draws	(Japan) Himeno Sakatsume; 7–6^{(7–1)}, 6–3	(Romania) Anca Todoni	(United States) Salma Ewing (Japan) Saki Imamura	(Canada) Raphaëlle Lacasse (United States) Haley Giavara (Japan) Nao Hibino (Canada) Katherine Sebov
August 11	Saskatoon Challenger; Saskatoon, Canada; Hard; W50; Singles and doubles draws	(Japan) Saki Imamura (Japan) Hiroko Kuwata; 7–6^{(7–3)}, 3–6, [10–1]	(Canada) Raphaëlle Lacasse (Canada) Alexandra Vagramov	(United States) Salma Ewing (Japan) Saki Imamura	(Canada) Raphaëlle Lacasse (United States) Haley Giavara (Japan) Nao Hibino (Canada) Katherine Sebov
August 11	Aldershot, United Kingdom; Hard; W35; Singles and doubles draws	(Japan) Hiromi Abe; 7–6^{(7–4)}, 6–2	(France) Harmony Tan	(United Kingdom) Hannah Klugman (Japan) Rinko Matsuda	(United Kingdom) Brooke Black (Poland) Martyna Kubka (Luxembourg) Marie Weckerle (United Kingdom) Lily Miyazaki
August 11	Aldershot, United Kingdom; Hard; W35; Singles and doubles draws	(Japan) Hiromi Abe (Japan) Akiko Omae; 6–7^{(2–7)}, 6–3, [10–8]	(United Kingdom) Esther Adeshina (United Kingdom) Victoria Allen	(United Kingdom) Hannah Klugman (Japan) Rinko Matsuda	(United Kingdom) Brooke Black (Poland) Martyna Kubka (Luxembourg) Marie Weckerle (United Kingdom) Lily Miyazaki
August 11	Vigo, Spain; Hard; W35; Singles and doubles draws	(United States) Carol Young Suh Lee; 6–3, 6–4	(Czech Republic) Vendula Valdmannová	(Spain) Marina Bassols Ribera (Australia) Elena Micic	(Norway) Malene Helgø; Aliona Falei; Polina Iatcenko (Spain) Alice Ferlito
August 11	Vigo, Spain; Hard; W35; Singles and doubles draws	(Netherlands) Joy de Zeeuw (Czech Republic) Vendula Valdmannová; 7–5, 6–2	(United States) Carol Young Suh Lee (Australia) Tenika McGiffin	(Spain) Marina Bassols Ribera (Australia) Elena Micic	(Norway) Malene Helgø; Aliona Falei; Polina Iatcenko (Spain) Alice Ferlito
August 11	Erwitte, Germany; Clay; W35; Singles and doubles draws	(Germany) Tessa Johanna Brockmann; 6–3, 6–3	(France) Alice Tubello	(Germany) Tina Mănescu (Georgia (country)) Sofia Shapatava	(Germany) Joëlle Steur (Germany) Eva Bennemann (France) Amandine Monnot (Ukraine) Veronika Podrez
August 11	Erwitte, Germany; Clay; W35; Singles and doubles draws	(Belgium) Tilwith Di Girolami (Indonesia) Priska Nugroho; 7–6^{(12–10)}, 6–1	(Germany) Laura Böhner (Germany) Mina Hodzic	(Germany) Tina Mănescu (Georgia (country)) Sofia Shapatava	(Germany) Joëlle Steur (Germany) Eva Bennemann (France) Amandine Monnot (Ukraine) Veronika Podrez
August 11	Bydgoszcz, Poland; Clay; W35; Singles and doubles draws	(Italy) Tatiana Pieri; 6–2, 6–3	(Sweden) Kajsa Rinaldo Persson	(Slovenia) Dalila Jakupović (Poland) Weronika Ewald	(Poland) Zuzanna Pawlikowska (Italy) Jessica Pieri (Brazil) Gabriela Cé (Poland) Weronika Falkowska
August 11	Bydgoszcz, Poland; Clay; W35; Singles and doubles draws	(Poland) Zuzanna Pawlikowska (Greece) Sapfo Sakellaridi; 6–2, 6–4	(Slovakia) Katarína Kužmová (Slovakia) Nina Vargová	(Slovenia) Dalila Jakupović (Poland) Weronika Ewald	(Poland) Zuzanna Pawlikowska (Italy) Jessica Pieri (Brazil) Gabriela Cé (Poland) Weronika Falkowska
August 11	Tweed Heads, Australia; Hard; W15; Singles and doubles draws	(Australia) Amy Stevens; 6–4, 6–0	(Hong Kong) Shek Cheuk-ying	(Australia) Gabriella Da Silva-Fick (Australia) Alana Subasic	(South Korea) Ha Sun-min (Australia) Jizelle Sibai (Australia) Belle Thompson (Australia) Sarah Mildren
August 11	Tweed Heads, Australia; Hard; W15; Singles and doubles draws	(New Zealand) Monique Barry (Australia) Gabriella Da Silva-Fick; 6–4, 6–1	(Australia) Alana Subasic (Australia) Belle Thompson	(Australia) Gabriella Da Silva-Fick (Australia) Alana Subasic	(South Korea) Ha Sun-min (Australia) Jizelle Sibai (Australia) Belle Thompson (Australia) Sarah Mildren
August 11	Singapore, Singapore; Hard (i); W15; Singles and doubles draws	(South Korea) Kim Yu-jin; 7–6^{(7–3)}, 6–4	(Japan) Haruna Arakawa	Elina Nepliy (Japan) Mio Mushika	(Japan) Anri Nagata (Japan) Erika Sema (China) Zhang Ying (China) Guo Meiqi
August 11	Singapore, Singapore; Hard (i); W15; Singles and doubles draws	(South Korea) Im Hee-rae (South Korea) Cherry Kim; 2–6, 6–4, [10–1]	(Japan) Yuka Hosoki (Japan) Hikaru Sato	Elina Nepliy (Japan) Mio Mushika	(Japan) Anri Nagata (Japan) Erika Sema (China) Zhang Ying (China) Guo Meiqi
August 11	Lu'an, China; Hard; W15; Singles and doubles draws	(South Korea) Jeong Bo-young; 6–4, 6–2	(Chinese Taipei) Yang Ya-yi	(China) Zhang Junhan (Slovakia) Viktória Morvayová	(China) Jiang Zijun (China) Huang Yujia (China) Wang Yuhan (Japan) Naho Sato
August 11	Lu'an, China; Hard; W15; Singles and doubles draws	(South Korea) Kim Da-bin (Chinese Taipei) Lin Fang-an; 5–7, 6–3, [10–5]	(China) Huang Yujia (China) Xiao Zhenghua	(China) Zhang Junhan (Slovakia) Viktória Morvayová	(China) Jiang Zijun (China) Huang Yujia (China) Wang Yuhan (Japan) Naho Sato
August 11	Astana, Kazakhstan; Hard; W15; Singles and doubles draws	Ekaterina Khayrutdinova; 6–2, 7–6^{(7–2)}	Anna Kubareva	Victoria Milovanova; Kristina Kroitor	(Kazakhstan) Asylzhan Arystanbekova; Daria Zelinskaya (Georgia (country)) Zoziya Kardava; Valeria Savinykh
August 11	Astana, Kazakhstan; Hard; W15; Singles and doubles draws	Ekaterina Khayrutdinova; Anna Kubareva; 0–6, 7–6^{(7–5)}, [10–8]	(Kazakhstan) Yekaterina Dmitrichenko (Kazakhstan) Aruzhan Sagandykova	Victoria Milovanova; Kristina Kroitor	(Kazakhstan) Asylzhan Arystanbekova; Daria Zelinskaya (Georgia (country)) Zoziya Kardava; Valeria Savinykh
August 11	Otopeni, Romania; Clay; W15; Singles and doubles draws	(Italy) Angelica Raggi; 6–2, 6–2	(Spain) Cristina Díaz Adrover	(Germany) Sonja Zhenikhova (Italy) Jessica Bertoldo	(Romania) Eva Maria Ionescu (Italy) Federica Sacco (Bulgaria) Lidia Encheva (Romania) Anamaria Oana
August 11	Otopeni, Romania; Clay; W15; Singles and doubles draws	(Romania) Alexandra Irina Anghel (Romania) Carmen Andreea Herea; 4–6, 6–3, [11–9]	Maria Andrienko (Belgium) Margaux Maquet	(Germany) Sonja Zhenikhova (Italy) Jessica Bertoldo	(Romania) Eva Maria Ionescu (Italy) Federica Sacco (Bulgaria) Lidia Encheva (Romania) Anamaria Oana
August 11	Monastir, Tunisia; Hard; W15; Singles and doubles draws	(Belgium) Jeline Vandromme; 6–2, 6–1	(Czech Republic) Alena Kovačková	(Bulgaria) Iva Ivanova (France) Laïa Petretic	(France) Jenny Lim (India) Tanisha Kashyap (United States) Jenna DeFalco (China) Tian Jialin
August 11	Monastir, Tunisia; Hard; W15; Singles and doubles draws	(Czech Republic) Alena Kovačková (Czech Republic) Jana Kovačková; 7–5, 6–2	(Bulgaria) Iva Ivanova (Belgium) Jeline Vandromme	(Bulgaria) Iva Ivanova (France) Laïa Petretic	(France) Jenny Lim (India) Tanisha Kashyap (United States) Jenna DeFalco (China) Tian Jialin
August 11	Santiago, Chile; Clay; W15; Singles and doubles draws	(Chile) Antonia Vergara Rivera; 6–2, 4–6, 6–1	(Argentina) Carla Markus	(Argentina) Justina María González Daniele (Chile) Fernanda Labraña	(Argentina) Victoria Bosio (Peru) Romina Ccuno (Ecuador) Camila Romero (Czech Republic) Kateřina Mandelíková
August 11	Santiago, Chile; Clay; W15; Singles and doubles draws	(Peru) Romina Ccuno (Chile) Fernanda Labraña; 6–1, 6–3	(Italy) Beatrice Stagno (Chile) Antonia Vergara Rivera	(Argentina) Justina María González Daniele (Chile) Fernanda Labraña	(Argentina) Victoria Bosio (Peru) Romina Ccuno (Ecuador) Camila Romero (Czech Republic) Kateřina Mandelíková
August 11	Huntsville, United States; Clay; W15; Singles and doubles draws	(United States) Ava Hrastar; 6–1, 6–1	(South Africa) Gabriella Broadfoot	(United States) Piper Charney (United States) Mia Slama	(United States) Claire Hill (United States) Elizabeth Coleman (United States) Carson Tanguilig (Spain) Aran Teixidó García
August 11	Huntsville, United States; Clay; W15; Singles and doubles draws	(Spain) Isabel Adrover Gallego (Spain) Aran Teixidó García; 6–2, 6–4	(South Africa) Gabriella Broadfoot (United States) Mia Slama	(United States) Piper Charney (United States) Mia Slama	(United States) Claire Hill (United States) Elizabeth Coleman (United States) Carson Tanguilig (Spain) Aran Teixidó García
August 18	Bistrița, Romania; Clay; W50; Singles and doubles draws	(Romania) Miriam Bulgaru; 6–0, 6–3	(Portugal) Matilde Jorge	(Serbia) Mia Ristić (Switzerland) Ylena In-Albon	(Romania) Bianca Bărbulescu (Romania) Eva Maria Ionescu; Ekaterina Kazionova (Italy) Tyra Caterina Grant
August 18	Bistrița, Romania; Clay; W50; Singles and doubles draws	(Spain) Ángela Fita Boluda (Switzerland) Ylena In-Albon; 7–6^{(7–5)}, 7–5	(Chinese Taipei) Li Yu-yun; Daria Lodikova	(Serbia) Mia Ristić (Switzerland) Ylena In-Albon	(Romania) Bianca Bărbulescu (Romania) Eva Maria Ionescu; Ekaterina Kazionova (Italy) Tyra Caterina Grant
August 18	Verbier, Switzerland; Clay; W35; Singles and doubles draws	(Australia) Tina Nadine Smith; 6–3, 6–4	(Switzerland) Alina Granwehr	(Georgia (country)) Sofia Shapatava (Slovenia) Dalila Jakupović	(Italy) Anastasia Bertacchi (France) Tiphanie Lemaître (Italy) Dalila Spiteri (Poland) Zuzanna Pawlikowska
August 18	Verbier, Switzerland; Clay; W35; Singles and doubles draws	(France) Tiphanie Lemaître (Australia) Tina Nadine Smith; 6–7^{(3–7)}, 6–3, [10–5]	(Bulgaria) Rositsa Dencheva (Poland) Monika Stankiewicz	(Georgia (country)) Sofia Shapatava (Slovenia) Dalila Jakupović	(Italy) Anastasia Bertacchi (France) Tiphanie Lemaître (Italy) Dalila Spiteri (Poland) Zuzanna Pawlikowska
August 18	Lu'an, China; Hard; W15; Singles and doubles draws	Kristiana Sidorova; 3–6, 7–6^{(10–8)}, 6–1	(Japan) Kayo Nishimura	(South Korea) Kim Da-bin (South Korea) Jeong Bo-young	(China) Lu Jiajing (Chinese Taipei) Lin Fang-an (Japan) Chihiro Muramatsu (China) Yang Yidi
August 18	Lu'an, China; Hard; W15; Singles and doubles draws	(Chinese Taipei) Lin Fang-an (Chinese Taipei) Yang Ya-yi; 6–4, 7–6^{(7–4)}	(Sweden) Tiana Tian Deng (China) Wang Meiling	(South Korea) Kim Da-bin (South Korea) Jeong Bo-young	(China) Lu Jiajing (Chinese Taipei) Lin Fang-an (Japan) Chihiro Muramatsu (China) Yang Yidi
August 18	Nakhon Pathom, Thailand; Hard; W15; Singles and doubles draws	(Thailand) Patcharin Cheapchandej; 6–3, 7–6^{(7–4)}	(Japan) Misaki Matsuda	(Thailand) Anchisa Chanta (China) Tian Fangran	(Japan) Rina Saigo (Thailand) Peangtarn Plipuech (Japan) Shiho Akita (China) Wang Yuhan
August 18	Nakhon Pathom, Thailand; Hard; W15; Singles and doubles draws	(South Korea) Kim Na-ri (China) Ye Qiuyu; 6–3, 6–0	(Thailand) Anchisa Chanta (Thailand) Patcharin Cheapchandej	(Thailand) Anchisa Chanta (China) Tian Fangran	(Japan) Rina Saigo (Thailand) Peangtarn Plipuech (Japan) Shiho Akita (China) Wang Yuhan
August 18	Logroño, Spain; Hard; W15; Singles and doubles draws	(United States) Ashley Lahey; 6–2, 6–3	(United Kingdom) Alice Gillan	(Spain) Claudia Ferrer Pérez (Netherlands) Britt du Pree	(Spain) Lorena Solar Donoso (Spain) Judith Perelló Saavedra (Spain) Charo Esquiva Bañuls (Italy) Giuliana Bestetti
August 18	Logroño, Spain; Hard; W15; Singles and doubles draws	(France) Alyssa Réguer (Egypt) Sandra Samir; 6–4, 6–0	(Spain) Leire San José (Spain) Maria Trujillo Garnica	(Spain) Claudia Ferrer Pérez (Netherlands) Britt du Pree	(Spain) Lorena Solar Donoso (Spain) Judith Perelló Saavedra (Spain) Charo Esquiva Bañuls (Italy) Giuliana Bestetti
August 18	Wanfercée-Baulet, Belgium; Clay; W15; Singles and doubles draws	(France) Alice Tubello; 6–7^{(4–7)}, 6–3, 6–2	(Belgium) Amélie Van Impe	(Ukraine) Veronika Podrez (Germany) Mina Hodzic	Maria Andrienko (Italy) Laura Mair (Belgium) Margaux Maquet (Germany) Yana Morderger
August 18	Wanfercée-Baulet, Belgium; Clay; W15; Singles and doubles draws	Polina Bakhmutkina (Germany) Anna Petkovic; 6–4, 6–1	(Belgium) Kaat Coppez (Belgium) Amélie Van Impe	(Ukraine) Veronika Podrez (Germany) Mina Hodzic	Maria Andrienko (Italy) Laura Mair (Belgium) Margaux Maquet (Germany) Yana Morderger
August 18	Kraków, Poland; Clay; W15; Singles and doubles draws	(Czech Republic) Julie Štruplová; 6–2, 6–3	(France) Yara Bartashevich	(Poland) Marcelina Podlińska (Italy) Viola Turini	(Poland) Inka Wawrzkiewicz (Italy) Gaia Maduzzi (Poland) Oriana Gniewkowska (Sweden) Linea Bajraliu
August 18	Kraków, Poland; Clay; W15; Singles and doubles draws	(Hungary) Adrienn Nagy (Czech Republic) Linda Ševčíková; 6–3, 6–0	(Poland) Gina Feistel (Poland) Marcelina Podlińska	(Poland) Marcelina Podlińska (Italy) Viola Turini	(Poland) Inka Wawrzkiewicz (Italy) Gaia Maduzzi (Poland) Oriana Gniewkowska (Sweden) Linea Bajraliu
August 18	Ankara, Turkiye; Hard; W15; Singles and doubles draws	Maria Golovina; 6–3, 2–6, 7–5	Varvara Panshina	(Latvia) Adelina Lachinova (France) Dune Vaissaud	Ekaterina Yashina (South Africa) Wozuko Mdlulwa (Turkey) Doğa Türkmen (France) Marie Villet
August 18	Ankara, Turkiye; Hard; W15; Singles and doubles draws	Maria Golovina; Varvara Panshina; 4–6, 6–3, [10–5]	(Latvia) Adelina Lachinova (Turkey) Doğa Türkmen	(Latvia) Adelina Lachinova (France) Dune Vaissaud	Ekaterina Yashina (South Africa) Wozuko Mdlulwa (Turkey) Doğa Türkmen (France) Marie Villet
August 18	Monastir, Tunisia; Hard; W15; Singles and doubles draws	(Czech Republic) Jana Kovačková; 7–6^{(7–5)}, 6–3	(United States) Carolyn Ansari	(France) Yasmine Mansouri (Czech Republic) Alena Kovačková	(Finland) Clarissa Blomqvist (Serbia) Elena Milovanović (Portugal) Sana Garakani (United States) Jordyn McBride
August 18	Monastir, Tunisia; Hard; W15; Singles and doubles draws	(Czech Republic) Alena Kovačková (Czech Republic) Jana Kovačková; 7–6^{(7–2)}, 6–4	(France) Yasmine Mansouri (Serbia) Elena Milovanović	(France) Yasmine Mansouri (Czech Republic) Alena Kovačková	(Finland) Clarissa Blomqvist (Serbia) Elena Milovanović (Portugal) Sana Garakani (United States) Jordyn McBride
August 18	Santiago, Chile; Clay; W15; Singles and doubles draws	(Chile) Antonia Vergara Rivera; 6–3, 6–2	(Ecuador) Mell Reasco González	(Chile) Fernanda Labraña (Brazil) Ana Candiotto	(Peru) Michela Castro Zunino (Argentina) Carla Markus (Peru) Romina Ccuno (Ecuador) Camila Romero
August 18	Santiago, Chile; Clay; W15; Singles and doubles draws	(Peru) Romina Ccuno (Chile) Fernanda Labraña; 6–2, 6–3	(Ecuador) Camila Romero (Chile) Antonia Vergara Rivera	(Chile) Fernanda Labraña (Brazil) Ana Candiotto	(Peru) Michela Castro Zunino (Argentina) Carla Markus (Peru) Romina Ccuno (Ecuador) Camila Romero
August 25	Oldenzaal, Netherlands; Clay; W50; Singles and doubles draws	(Germany) Noma Noha Akugue; 7–6^{(9–7)}, 7–6^{(7–5)}	(Italy) Silvia Ambrosio	(Germany) Josy Daems (Germany) Antonia Schmidt	(Netherlands) Isis Louise van den Broek (Netherlands) Loes Ebeling Koning (Netherlands) Stephanie Visscher (Belgium) Amélie Van Impe
August 25	Oldenzaal, Netherlands; Clay; W50; Singles and doubles draws	(Netherlands) Joy de Zeeuw (Netherlands) Sarah van Emst; 7–6^{(7–3)}, 7–6^{(7–4)}	(Germany) Noma Noha Akugue (Turkey) İpek Öz	(Germany) Josy Daems (Germany) Antonia Schmidt	(Netherlands) Isis Louise van den Broek (Netherlands) Loes Ebeling Koning (Netherlands) Stephanie Visscher (Belgium) Amélie Van Impe
August 25	Bytom, Poland; Clay; W50; Singles and doubles draws	(Sweden) Kajsa Rinaldo Persson; 6–3, 6–3	(Italy) Tyra Caterina Grant	(Greece) Despina Papamichail (Ukraine) Katarina Zavatska	(France) Yara Bartashevich (Italy) Laura Mair (Poland) Gina Feistel (Netherlands) Eva Vedder
August 25	Bytom, Poland; Clay; W50; Singles and doubles draws	(Poland) Weronika Ewald (Poland) Zuzanna Pawlikowska; 3–6, 6–3, [10–7]	(Czech Republic) Aneta Kučmová (Italy) Miriana Tona	(Greece) Despina Papamichail (Ukraine) Katarina Zavatska	(France) Yara Bartashevich (Italy) Laura Mair (Poland) Gina Feistel (Netherlands) Eva Vedder
August 25	Nakhon Pathom, Thailand; Hard; W35; Singles and doubles draws	(Thailand) Patcharin Cheapchandej; 6–1, 6–2	(South Korea) Jang Gaeul	(Japan) Eri Shimizu (Thailand) Anchisa Chanta	(Japan) Hikaru Sato (South Korea) Lee Eun-hye (China) Tian Fangran (Japan) Shiho Akita
August 25	Nakhon Pathom, Thailand; Hard; W35; Singles and doubles draws	(Thailand) Patcharin Cheapchandej (Thailand) Peangtarn Plipuech; 6–3, 6–1	(Japan) Sakura Hosogi (Japan) Misaki Matsuda	(Japan) Eri Shimizu (Thailand) Anchisa Chanta	(Japan) Hikaru Sato (South Korea) Lee Eun-hye (China) Tian Fangran (Japan) Shiho Akita
August 25	Verbier, Switzerland; Clay; W35; Singles and doubles draws	(Australia) Tina Nadine Smith; 5–7, 6–3, 7–5	(France) Tiphanie Lemaître	(Switzerland) Fiona Ganz (Greece) Valentini Grammatikopoulou	(Georgia (country)) Sofia Shapatava (Australia) Melisa Ercan (Bulgaria) Rositsa Dencheva (Finland) Laura Hietaranta
August 25	Verbier, Switzerland; Clay; W35; Singles and doubles draws	(Germany) Marie Vogt (Germany) Eva Marie Voracek; Walkover	(Bulgaria) Rositsa Dencheva (Poland) Monika Stankiewicz	(Switzerland) Fiona Ganz (Greece) Valentini Grammatikopoulou	(Georgia (country)) Sofia Shapatava (Australia) Melisa Ercan (Bulgaria) Rositsa Dencheva (Finland) Laura Hietaranta
August 25	Trieste, Italy; Clay; W35; Singles and doubles draws	(Italy) Jennifer Ruggeri; 6–4, 2–6, 6–4	(Italy) Samira De Stefano	(Spain) Marina Bassols Ribera (Italy) Lisa Pigato	(Slovakia) Radka Zelníčková (Slovenia) Dalila Jakupović (Germany) Emily Seibold (Italy) Alessandra Mazzola
August 25	Trieste, Italy; Clay; W35; Singles and doubles draws	(Italy) Samira De Stefano (Italy) Alessandra Mazzola; 6–3, 6–0	(Italy) Aurora Corvi (Italy) Jennifer Ruggeri	(Spain) Marina Bassols Ribera (Italy) Lisa Pigato	(Slovakia) Radka Zelníčková (Slovenia) Dalila Jakupović (Germany) Emily Seibold (Italy) Alessandra Mazzola
August 25	Brașov, Romania; Clay; W35; Singles and doubles draws	(Spain) Ángela Fita Boluda; 7–5, 6–4	(Czech Republic) Julie Štruplová	(Bulgaria) Isabella Shinikova (Serbia) Mia Ristić	(Romania) Ilinca Amariei (Romania) Briana Szabó (Romania) Elena Ruxandra Bertea (Romania) Anamaria Oana
August 25	Brașov, Romania; Clay; W35; Singles and doubles draws	(Romania) Ștefania Bojică (Romania) Briana Szabó; 5–7, 6–2, [10–7]	(Japan) Kanako Morisaki (Japan) Akiko Omae	(Bulgaria) Isabella Shinikova (Serbia) Mia Ristić	(Romania) Ilinca Amariei (Romania) Briana Szabó (Romania) Elena Ruxandra Bertea (Romania) Anamaria Oana
August 25	Heraklion, Greece; Hard; W35; Singles and doubles draws	(Serbia) Lola Radivojević; 6–0, 4–1 ret.	(Belgium) Sofia Costoulas	(Poland) Martyna Kubka (Turkey) Ayla Aksu	(France) Harmony Tan; Kira Pavlova (Slovakia) Viktória Hrunčáková (United States) Jenna DeFalco
August 25	Heraklion, Greece; Hard; W35; Singles and doubles draws	(Greece) Marianne Argyrokastriti (Greece) Elena Korokozidi; 6–0, 6–4	(Turkey) Defne Çırpanlı (Ukraine) Daria Yesypchuk	(Poland) Martyna Kubka (Turkey) Ayla Aksu	(France) Harmony Tan; Kira Pavlova (Slovakia) Viktória Hrunčáková (United States) Jenna DeFalco
August 25	Lu'an, China; Hard; W15; Singles and doubles draws	(China) Chen Mengyi; 6–2, 3–6, 6–4	(China) Ren Yufei	(Japan) Kayo Nishimura (Japan) Shiho Tsujioka	(China) Hou Yanan; Jana Kolodynska (China) Wang Jiaqi (China) Wang Meiling
August 25	Lu'an, China; Hard; W15; Singles and doubles draws	(China) Aitiyaguli Aixirefu (China) Wang Jiaqi; 6–1, 7–5	(Japan) Anri Nagata (Japan) Michika Ozeki	(Japan) Kayo Nishimura (Japan) Shiho Tsujioka	(China) Hou Yanan; Jana Kolodynska (China) Wang Jiaqi (China) Wang Meiling
August 25	Telavi, Georgia; Clay; W15; Singles and doubles draws	(Switzerland) Katerina Tsygourova; 6–7^{(5–7)}, 6–1, 7–5	(Canada) Alexandra Vagramov	(Armenia) Ani Amiraghyan (Spain) Aran Teixidó García	(Georgia (country)) Zoziya Kardava; Sofia Martianova (Germany) Angelina Wirges; Kristina Kroitor
August 25	Telavi, Georgia; Clay; W15; Singles and doubles draws	Ekaterina Agureeva; Ksenia Smirnova; 6–4, 6–4	Ulyana Hrabavets; Nina Rudiukova	(Armenia) Ani Amiraghyan (Spain) Aran Teixidó García	(Georgia (country)) Zoziya Kardava; Sofia Martianova (Germany) Angelina Wirges; Kristina Kroitor
August 25	Ankara, Turkiye; Hard; W15; Singles and doubles draws	(Slovakia) Katarína Kužmová; 6–2, 6–0	(France) Dune Vaissaud	(Ukraine) Kateryna Lazarenko; Ekaterina Yashina	(Australia) Stefani Webb (Latvia) Sabīne Rutlauka (Iran) Mandegar Farzami (Colombia) María Herazo González
August 25	Ankara, Turkiye; Hard; W15; Singles and doubles draws	Maria Golovina (Slovakia) Katarína Kužmová; 7–5, 3–6, [10–4]	(Colombia) María Herazo González (Ukraine) Anastasiya Zaparyniuk	(Ukraine) Kateryna Lazarenko; Ekaterina Yashina	(Australia) Stefani Webb (Latvia) Sabīne Rutlauka (Iran) Mandegar Farzami (Colombia) María Herazo González
August 25	Kaltenkirchen, Germany; Clay; W15; Singles and doubles draws	(Germany) Tessa Johanna Brockmann; 6–3, 7–5	(Ukraine) Polina Skliar	(Germany) Anna Petkovic (Switzerland) Marie Mettraux	(Finland) Ella Haavisto (Austria) Claudia Gasparovic (Czech Republic) Barbora Michálková (Spain) Marta Soriano Santiago
August 25	Kaltenkirchen, Germany; Clay; W15; Singles and doubles draws	(Belgium) Kaat Coppez (Belgium) Tamila Gadamauri; 7–6^{(7–5)}, 4–6, [10–7]	(Germany) Anna Petkovic; Anastasia Pribylova	(Germany) Anna Petkovic (Switzerland) Marie Mettraux	(Finland) Ella Haavisto (Austria) Claudia Gasparovic (Czech Republic) Barbora Michálková (Spain) Marta Soriano Santiago
August 25	Monastir, Tunisia; Hard; W15; Singles and doubles draws	(Serbia) Elena Milovanović; 6–1, 6–7^{(4–7)}, 6–2	(China) Mi Lan	(United States) Carolyn Ansari (Japan) Hiroko Kuwata	(United States) Lilian Poling (Netherlands) Klara Veldman (Italy) Caterina Odorizzi (New Zealand) Isabella Harvison
August 25	Monastir, Tunisia; Hard; W15; Singles and doubles draws	(Italy) Caterina Odorizzi (Austria) Mavie Österreicher; 6–4, 2–6, [12–10]	(United Kingdom) Lauryn John-Baptiste (Serbia) Elena Milovanović	(United States) Carolyn Ansari (Japan) Hiroko Kuwata	(United States) Lilian Poling (Netherlands) Klara Veldman (Italy) Caterina Odorizzi (New Zealand) Isabella Harvison

=== September ===
Week of	Tournament	Winner	Runners-up	Semifinalists	Quarterfinalists
September 1	Ladies Open Vienna; Vienna, Austria; Clay; W75; Singles – Doubles	(Austria) Sinja Kraus; 3–6, 6–2, 6–3	(Romania) Miriam Bulgaru	(Austria) Anna Pircher (Austria) Lilli Tagger	(Ukraine) Katarina Zavatska (Switzerland) Ylena In-Albon (France) Alice Ramé (Spain) Irene Burillo
September 1	Ladies Open Vienna; Vienna, Austria; Clay; W75; Singles – Doubles	(Poland) Gina Feistel (Poland) Marcelina Podlińska; 2–6, 7–6^{(7–3)}, [10–8]	(United Kingdom) Madeleine Brooks (Slovenia) Dalila Jakupović	(Austria) Anna Pircher (Austria) Lilli Tagger	(Ukraine) Katarina Zavatska (Switzerland) Ylena In-Albon (France) Alice Ramé (Spain) Irene Burillo
September 1	Leiria, Portugal; Hard; W50; Singles and doubles draws	Alina Korneeva; 6–1, 7–5	(Czech Republic) Linda Fruhvirtová	(France) Harmony Tan (Spain) Kaitlin Quevedo	(United States) Jenna DeFalco (Portugal) Matilde Jorge (Canada) Katherine Sebov (Portugal) Francisca Jorge
September 1	Leiria, Portugal; Hard; W50; Singles and doubles draws	(France) Julie Belgraver (Canada) Kayla Cross; 3–6, 6–3, [10–8]	(United States) Catherine Harrison (United States) Ashley Lahey	(France) Harmony Tan (Spain) Kaitlin Quevedo	(United States) Jenna DeFalco (Portugal) Matilde Jorge (Canada) Katherine Sebov (Portugal) Francisca Jorge
September 1	Saint-Palais-sur-Mer, France; Clay; W50; Singles and doubles draws	(France) Alice Tubello; 7–6^{(7–5)}, 6–2	Julia Avdeeva	(Lithuania) Justina Mikulskytė (Sweden) Caijsa Hennemann	(Turkey) Çağla Büyükakçay; Anastasia Tikhonova (Italy) Silvia Ambrosio (France) Marine Szostak
September 1	Saint-Palais-sur-Mer, France; Clay; W50; Singles and doubles draws	(Switzerland) Naïma Karamoko (Lithuania) Justina Mikulskytė; 6–1, 6–2	Polina Kaibekova (Netherlands) Demi Tran	(Lithuania) Justina Mikulskytė (Sweden) Caijsa Hennemann	(Turkey) Çağla Büyükakçay; Anastasia Tikhonova (Italy) Silvia Ambrosio (France) Marine Szostak
September 1	Slobozia, Romania; Clay; W50; Singles and doubles draws	(North Macedonia) Lina Gjorcheska; 3–6, 6–3, 6–4	(Romania) Elena Ruxandra Bertea	(Romania) Georgia Crăciun (Romania) Maria Sara Popa	(Romania) Oana Georgeta Simion (Greece) Valentini Grammatikopoulou (Croatia) Lucija Ćirić Bagarić; Daria Lodikova
September 1	Slobozia, Romania; Clay; W50; Singles and doubles draws	(Japan) Mana Kawamura (Japan) Kanako Morisaki; 7–6^{(7–1)}, 1–6, [10–2]	(Romania) Elena Ruxandra Bertea; Daria Lodikova	(Romania) Georgia Crăciun (Romania) Maria Sara Popa	(Romania) Oana Georgeta Simion (Greece) Valentini Grammatikopoulou (Croatia) Lucija Ćirić Bagarić; Daria Lodikova
September 1	Nakhon Pathom, Thailand; Hard; W35; Singles and doubles draws	(South Korea) Ku Yeon-woo; 6–4, 2–0 ret.	(Thailand) Anchisa Chanta	(South Korea) Lee Eun-hye (Japan) Rina Saigo	(China) Wang Yuhan (China) Lu Jiajing (Japan) Miho Kuramochi (China) Tian Fangran
September 1	Nakhon Pathom, Thailand; Hard; W35; Singles and doubles draws	(Japan) Mana Ayukawa (Japan) Eri Shimizu; 6–2, 6–7^{(5–7)}, [10–8]	(Japan) Natsumi Kawaguchi (Japan) Erika Sema	(South Korea) Lee Eun-hye (Japan) Rina Saigo	(China) Wang Yuhan (China) Lu Jiajing (Japan) Miho Kuramochi (China) Tian Fangran
September 1	Punta Cana, Dominican Republic; Clay; W35; Singles and doubles draws	(Germany) Katharina Hobgarski; 6–3, 5–7, 6–4	(Argentina) Luisina Giovannini	(India) Sahaja Yamalapalli (United States) Madison Brengle	(United States) Madison Sieg (Mexico) María Portillo Ramírez (France) Sophia Biolay (Poland) Weronika Falkowska
September 1	Punta Cana, Dominican Republic; Clay; W35; Singles and doubles draws	(Poland) Weronika Falkowska (Germany) Katharina Hobgarski; 6–2, 7–5	(Italy) Anastasia Abbagnato (Netherlands) Stéphanie Visscher	(India) Sahaja Yamalapalli (United States) Madison Brengle	(United States) Madison Sieg (Mexico) María Portillo Ramírez (France) Sophia Biolay (Poland) Weronika Falkowska
September 1	Cuiabá, Brazil; Clay; W35; Singles and doubles draws	(United States) Hibah Shaikh; 2–6, 6–1, 6–2	(Argentina) Jazmín Ortenzi	(Ecuador) Mell Reasco González (Brazil) Ana Candiotto	(Bolivia) Noelia Zeballos (Brazil) Luiza Fullana (Brazil) Thaísa Grana Pedretti (Argentina) Martina Capurro Taborda
September 1	Cuiabá, Brazil; Clay; W35; Singles and doubles draws	(Argentina) Martina Capurro Taborda (Mexico) Marian Gómez Pezuela Cano; 6–4, 6–3	(Peru) Romina Ccuno (Colombia) María Paulina Pérez	(Ecuador) Mell Reasco González (Brazil) Ana Candiotto	(Bolivia) Noelia Zeballos (Brazil) Luiza Fullana (Brazil) Thaísa Grana Pedretti (Argentina) Martina Capurro Taborda
September 1	Yeongwol, South Korea; Hard; W15; Singles and doubles draws	(South Korea) Lee Su-ha; 6–4, 6–3	(Japan) Natsuki Yoshimoto	(Japan) Sae Noguchi (South Korea) Park Eun-yeong	(Japan) Mayuka Aikawa (Japan) Nagi Hanatani (South Korea) Jeong Ui-su (Japan) Shiho Tsujioka
September 1	Yeongwol, South Korea; Hard; W15; Singles and doubles draws	(South Korea) Im Hee-rae (South Korea) Kim Da-bin; 6–3, 2–6, [10–8]	(South Korea) Lee Su-ha (South Korea) Son Ha-yoon	(Japan) Sae Noguchi (South Korea) Park Eun-yeong	(Japan) Mayuka Aikawa (Japan) Nagi Hanatani (South Korea) Jeong Ui-su (Japan) Shiho Tsujioka
September 1	Lu'an, China; Hard; W15; Singles and doubles draws	(Kazakhstan) Aruzhan Sagandykova; 6–4, 6–3	Maria Kalyakina	(Japan) Kayo Nishimura (China) Hou Yanan	(China) Cai Jialan (Japan) Michika Ozeki (Malaysia) Shihomi Leong (China) Wang Jiayi
September 1	Lu'an, China; Hard; W15; Singles and doubles draws	(Japan) Anri Nagata (Japan) Michika Ozeki; 6–3, 1–6, [10–5]	(China) Ni Ma Zhuoma (Hong Kong) Cody Wong	(Japan) Kayo Nishimura (China) Hou Yanan	(China) Cai Jialan (Japan) Michika Ozeki (Malaysia) Shihomi Leong (China) Wang Jiayi
September 1	Telavi, Georgia; Clay; W15; Singles and doubles draws	(Switzerland) Katerina Tsygourova; 6–4, 6–4	Kristina Kroitor	Ulyana Hrabavets (Georgia (country)) Zoziya Kardava	(Canada) Alexandra Vagramov (Germany) Angelina Wirges (Spain) Aran Teixidó García (Denmark) Elena Jamshidi
September 1	Telavi, Georgia; Clay; W15; Singles and doubles draws	(Spain) Aran Teixidó García (Spain) Meritxell Teixidó García; 6–1, 7–5	Ulyana Hrabavets; Nina Rudiukova	Ulyana Hrabavets (Georgia (country)) Zoziya Kardava	(Canada) Alexandra Vagramov (Germany) Angelina Wirges (Spain) Aran Teixidó García (Denmark) Elena Jamshidi
September 1	Kayseri, Turkiye; Hard; W15; Singles and doubles draws	(Australia) Alana Subasic; 6–2, 6–2	(Turkey) İrem Kurt	(Iran) Mandegar Farzami (Ukraine) Kateryna Lazarenko	(Switzerland) Ayline Samardzic; Anna Kartseva (Uzbekistan) Milana Maslenkova (Ukraine) Adriana Tkachenko
September 1	Kayseri, Turkiye; Hard; W15; Singles and doubles draws	(Colombia) María Herazo González (Australia) Alana Subasic; 6–7^{(4–7)}, 6–2, [11–9]	(Bulgaria) Dia Evtimova (Germany) Vivien Sandberg	(Iran) Mandegar Farzami (Ukraine) Kateryna Lazarenko	(Switzerland) Ayline Samardzic; Anna Kartseva (Uzbekistan) Milana Maslenkova (Ukraine) Adriana Tkachenko
September 1	Heraklion, Greece; Hard; W15; Singles and doubles draws	(Czech Republic) Vendula Valdmannová; 6–4, 6–3	(Ukraine) Kateryna Diatlova	(Luxembourg) Marie Weckerle (Greece) Marianne Argyrokastriti	(Turkey) Defne Çırpanlı (Italy) Lavinia Luciano (Italy) Federica Sacco (Greece) Elena Korokozidi
September 1	Heraklion, Greece; Hard; W15; Singles and doubles draws	(Greece) Marianne Argyrokastriti (Turkey) Defne Çırpanlı; 6–2, 6–3	(United States) Elizabeth Coleman (United States) Ava Hrastar	(Luxembourg) Marie Weckerle (Greece) Marianne Argyrokastriti	(Turkey) Defne Çırpanlı (Italy) Lavinia Luciano (Italy) Federica Sacco (Greece) Elena Korokozidi
September 1	Kuršumlijska Banja, Serbia; Clay; W15; Singles and doubles draws	(Serbia) Draginja Vuković; 6–2, 6–3	(Serbia) Natalija Senić	(Netherlands) Antonia Stoyanov (Bulgaria) Julia Stamatova	(Croatia) Ria Derniković (Serbia) Andrea Obradović (Argentina) Agustina Chlpac (Serbia) Tamara Čurović
September 1	Kuršumlijska Banja, Serbia; Clay; W15; Singles and doubles draws	(Serbia) Andrea Obradović (Serbia) Natalija Senić; 6–3, 6–1	(Bulgaria) Alexa Karatancheva (Bulgaria) Darya Velikova	(Netherlands) Antonia Stoyanov (Bulgaria) Julia Stamatova	(Croatia) Ria Derniković (Serbia) Andrea Obradović (Argentina) Agustina Chlpac (Serbia) Tamara Čurović
September 1	Fiano Romano, Italy; Clay; W15; Singles and doubles draws	(Italy) Jennifer Ruggeri; 6–4, 6–3	(Germany) Eva Marie Voracek	(Colombia) Yuliana Lizarazo (Czech Republic) Linda Ševčíková	(Germany) Laura Böhner (Italy) Angelica Raggi (Italy) Noemi Maines (Italy) Marta Lombardini
September 1	Fiano Romano, Italy; Clay; W15; Singles and doubles draws	(Colombia) Yuliana Lizarazo (Argentina) Maria Florencia Urrutia; 6–0, 6–4	(Germany) Laura Böhner (Germany) Eva Marie Voracek	(Colombia) Yuliana Lizarazo (Czech Republic) Linda Ševčíková	(Germany) Laura Böhner (Italy) Angelica Raggi (Italy) Noemi Maines (Italy) Marta Lombardini
September 1	Haren, Netherlands; Clay; W15; Singles and doubles draws	(Netherlands) Britt du Pree; 6–4, 3–6, 6–3	(Netherlands) Loes Ebeling Koning	(Netherlands) Sarah van Emst (Belgium) Tamila Gadamauri	(Ukraine) Anastasiia Firman (Belgium) Amélie Van Impe (Germany) Johanna Silva (Denmark) Johanne Svendsen
September 1	Haren, Netherlands; Clay; W15; Singles and doubles draws	(Netherlands) Joy de Zeeuw (Netherlands) Sarah van Emst; 6–2, 3–6, [12–10]	(Denmark) Rebecca Munk Mortensen (Denmark) Johanne Svendsen	(Netherlands) Sarah van Emst (Belgium) Tamila Gadamauri	(Ukraine) Anastasiia Firman (Belgium) Amélie Van Impe (Germany) Johanna Silva (Denmark) Johanne Svendsen
September 1	Dinard, France; Clay; W15; Singles and doubles draws	(France) Laetitia Sarrazin; 6–3, 6–4	(France) Seda Baslilar	(Austria) Anna Lena Ebster (Germany) Valentina Steiner	(Sweden) Isabella Svahn (Ukraine) Sofia Kryvoruchko (Belgium) Lisa Claeys (Bulgaria) Viktoria Veleva
September 1	Dinard, France; Clay; W15; Singles and doubles draws	(Netherlands) Merel Hoedt (Mexico) Sabastiani Leon; 6–3, 5–7, [10–3]	(France) Océane Babel (France) Helena Stevic	(Austria) Anna Lena Ebster (Germany) Valentina Steiner	(Sweden) Isabella Svahn (Ukraine) Sofia Kryvoruchko (Belgium) Lisa Claeys (Bulgaria) Viktoria Veleva
September 1	Dénia, Spain; Clay; W15; Singles and doubles draws	(Spain) Alba Rey García; 6–2, 7–5	(Italy) Verena Meliss	(Germany) Joëlle Steur (Sweden) Isabel Skoog	(Germany) Sina Herrmann (Romania) Iulia Maria Buculei (France) Eleejah Inisan (Czech Republic) Michaela Bayerlová
September 1	Dénia, Spain; Clay; W15; Singles and doubles draws	(Spain) Didi Bredberg Canizares (India) Madhurima Sawant; 6–3, 6–2	(Spain) Ariadna Garcia-Patrón Canals (Netherlands) Vanja Gudelj	(Germany) Joëlle Steur (Sweden) Isabel Skoog	(Germany) Sina Herrmann (Romania) Iulia Maria Buculei (France) Eleejah Inisan (Czech Republic) Michaela Bayerlová
September 1	Monastir, Tunisia; Hard; W15; Singles and doubles draws	(United Kingdom) Alicia Dudeney; 6–3, 6–3	Arina Bulatova	(Spain) Noelia Bouzó Zanotti (United States) Raveena Kingsley	(Canada) Raphaëlle Lacasse; Vlada Mincheva (Switzerland) Sofia Alekseeva (China) Mi Lan
September 1	Monastir, Tunisia; Hard; W15; Singles and doubles draws	Arina Bulatova (Germany) Anna Petkovic; 6–2, 7–6^{(7–5)}	(United Kingdom) Alicia Dudeney (India) Tanisha Kashyap	(Spain) Noelia Bouzó Zanotti (United States) Raveena Kingsley	(Canada) Raphaëlle Lacasse; Vlada Mincheva (Switzerland) Sofia Alekseeva (China) Mi Lan
September 1	Hurghada, Egypt; Hard; W15; Singles and doubles draws	(Egypt) Sandra Samir; 2–0 ret.	(Slovakia) Katarína Kužmová	Anna Kubareva; Daria Khomutsianskaya	(Egypt) Nada Fouad (Egypt) Yasmin Ezzat (Ukraine) Daria Yesypchuk (Italy) Maddalena Giordano
September 1	Hurghada, Egypt; Hard; W15; Singles and doubles draws	(Egypt) Yasmin Ezzat (Ukraine) Daria Yesypchuk; 6–3, 6–3	Daria Khomutsianskaya; Anna Kubareva	Anna Kubareva; Daria Khomutsianskaya	(Egypt) Nada Fouad (Egypt) Yasmin Ezzat (Ukraine) Daria Yesypchuk (Italy) Maddalena Giordano
September 8	Le Neubourg Open International; Le Neubourg, France; Hard; W75; Singles – Doubles	(Belgium) Greet Minnen; 6–2, 6–1	(Croatia) Petra Marčinko	Polina Iatcenko (France) Astrid Lew Yan Foon	(France) Tessah Andrianjafitrimo (Belgium) Sofia Costoulas (United Kingdom) Lily Miyazaki (France) Margaux Rouvroy
September 8	Le Neubourg Open International; Le Neubourg, France; Hard; W75; Singles – Doubles	(United Kingdom) Naiktha Bains (India) Rutuja Bhosale; 6–2, 1–6, [10–6]	Polina Iatcenko; Sofya Lansere	Polina Iatcenko (France) Astrid Lew Yan Foon	(France) Tessah Andrianjafitrimo (Belgium) Sofia Costoulas (United Kingdom) Lily Miyazaki (France) Margaux Rouvroy
September 8	Bucharest, Romania; Clay; W75; Singles and doubles draws	(Austria) Lilli Tagger; 6–4, 3–6, 6–4	(North Macedonia) Lina Gjorcheska	(Greece) Despina Papamichail (Burundi) Sada Nahimana	(Romania) Maria Sara Popa (Finland) Laura Hietaranta (Italy) Lisa Pigato (Serbia) Mia Ristić
September 8	Bucharest, Romania; Clay; W75; Singles and doubles draws	(Switzerland) Jenny Dürst (Slovakia) Nina Vargová; 6–1, 6–1	(Algeria) Inès Ibbou (Greece) Despina Papamichail	(Greece) Despina Papamichail (Burundi) Sada Nahimana	(Romania) Maria Sara Popa (Finland) Laura Hietaranta (Italy) Lisa Pigato (Serbia) Mia Ristić
September 8	Guiyang, China; Hard; W50; Singles and doubles draws	(China) Guo Hanyu; 6–3, 4–6, 6–1	(China) Zhu Lin	(China) Wang Jiaqi; Jana Kolodynska	(China) Tian Fangran (China) Ren Yufei (China) Liu Fangzhou (China) Wang Jiayi
September 8	Guiyang, China; Hard; W50; Singles and doubles draws	Varvara Panshina; Daria Zelinskaya; 6–2, 6–4	(China) Tian Fangran (China) Zhang Ying	(China) Wang Jiaqi; Jana Kolodynska	(China) Tian Fangran (China) Ren Yufei (China) Liu Fangzhou (China) Wang Jiayi
September 8	Évora, Portugal; Hard; W50; Singles and doubles draws	Alina Korneeva; 6–3, 6–1	(Spain) Kaitlin Quevedo	(Portugal) Angelina Voloshchuk (Canada) Kayla Cross	(Latvia) Elza Tomase (Canada) Katherine Sebov (Portugal) Francisca Jorge; Kristina Dmitruk
September 8	Évora, Portugal; Hard; W50; Singles and doubles draws	(United States) Catherine Harrison (United States) Ashley Lahey; 6–1, 1–6, [10–8]	(Czech Republic) Gabriela Knutson (United States) Malaika Rapolu	(Portugal) Angelina Voloshchuk (Canada) Kayla Cross	(Latvia) Elza Tomase (Canada) Katherine Sebov (Portugal) Francisca Jorge; Kristina Dmitruk
September 8	Wagga Wagga, Australia; Hard; W35; Singles and doubles draws	(United Kingdom) Katie Swan; 6–1, 6–2	(Australia) Taylah Preston	(Australia) Lizette Cabrera (Australia) Elena Micic	(Japan) Erika Sema (New Zealand) Monique Barry (Japan) Haruna Arakawa (Japan) Hayu Kinoshita
September 8	Wagga Wagga, Australia; Hard; W35; Singles and doubles draws	(Japan) Haruna Arakawa (Japan) Ayumi Miyamoto; 6–2, 4–6, [10–4]	(Australia) Elena Micic (Australia) Belle Thompson	(Australia) Lizette Cabrera (Australia) Elena Micic	(Japan) Erika Sema (New Zealand) Monique Barry (Japan) Haruna Arakawa (Japan) Hayu Kinoshita
September 8	Punta Cana, Dominican Republic; Clay; W35; Singles and doubles draws	(Serbia) Katarina Jokić; Walkover	(Germany) Katharina Hobgarski	(United States) Madison Sieg (Spain) Sara Dols	(Argentina) Luisina Giovannini (Germany) Carolina Kuhl (Italy) Anastasia Abbagnato (Poland) Weronika Falkowska
September 8	Punta Cana, Dominican Republic; Clay; W35; Singles and doubles draws	(Poland) Weronika Falkowska (Germany) Katharina Hobgarski; 6–2, 7–5	(Poland) Zuzanna Pawlikowska (Ecuador) Camila Romero	(United States) Madison Sieg (Spain) Sara Dols	(Argentina) Luisina Giovannini (Germany) Carolina Kuhl (Italy) Anastasia Abbagnato (Poland) Weronika Falkowska
September 8	Yeongwol, South Korea; Hard; W15; Singles and doubles draws	(Chinese Taipei) Lee Ya-hsuan; 6–2, 6–4	(Japan) Natsuki Yoshimoto	(South Korea) Kim Da-bin (Japan) Sae Noguchi	(United States) Amy Zhu (South Korea) Lee Su-ha (South Korea) Jang Soo-ha (Japan) Nana Kawagishi
September 8	Yeongwol, South Korea; Hard; W15; Singles and doubles draws	(Japan) Natsumi Kawaguchi (South Korea) Kim Da-bin; 6–4, 6–2	(South Korea) Ha Sun-min (Hong Kong) Shek Cheuk-ying	(South Korea) Kim Da-bin (Japan) Sae Noguchi	(United States) Amy Zhu (South Korea) Lee Su-ha (South Korea) Jang Soo-ha (Japan) Nana Kawagishi
September 8	Madrid, Spain; Hard; W15; Singles and doubles draws	(China) Ye Shiyu; 7–6^{(8–6)}, 6–1	(United States) Shannon Lam	(Spain) Alba Rey García (Spain) Judith Perelló Saavedra	(Spain) Carmen Gallardo Guevara (Spain) Carmen López Martínez (Switzerland) Paula Cembranos (China) Jialin Tian
September 8	Madrid, Spain; Hard; W15; Singles and doubles draws	(Italy) Valentina Losciale (Spain) Maria Oliver Sanchez; Walkover	(Switzerland) Paula Cembranos (Switzerland) Nicole Gadient	(Spain) Alba Rey García (Spain) Judith Perelló Saavedra	(Spain) Carmen Gallardo Guevara (Spain) Carmen López Martínez (Switzerland) Paula Cembranos (China) Jialin Tian
September 8	Dijon, France; Clay; W15; Singles and doubles draws	(Germany) Luisa Meyer auf der Heide; 7–6^{(7–1)}, 6–3	(Germany) Mina Hodzic	(Switzerland) Fiona Ganz (Belgium) Tamila Gadamauri	Polina Bakhmutkina (France) Astrid Cirotte (Netherlands) Merel Hoedt (France) Lucie Nguyen Tan
September 8	Dijon, France; Clay; W15; Singles and doubles draws	Polina Bakhmutkina (Germany) Mina Hodzic; 6–3, 6–7^{(5–7)}, [10–1]	(Mexico) Sabastiani Leon (Germany) Luisa Meyer auf der Heide	(Switzerland) Fiona Ganz (Belgium) Tamila Gadamauri	Polina Bakhmutkina (France) Astrid Cirotte (Netherlands) Merel Hoedt (France) Lucie Nguyen Tan
September 8	Viserba, Italy; Clay; W15; Singles and doubles draws	(Germany) Anne Schäfer; 6–4, 3–6, 7–6^{(8–6)}	(Italy) Deborah Chiesa	(Italy) Camilla Gennaro (Italy) Angelica Raggi	(Czech Republic) Linda Ševčíková (Czech Republic) Brenda Fruhvirtová (Italy) Francesca Gandolfi (Italy) Marta Lombardini
September 8	Viserba, Italy; Clay; W15; Singles and doubles draws	(Czech Republic) Linda Ševčíková (Germany) Eva Marie Voracek; 6–3, 6–2	(Italy) Camilla Gennaro (Italy) Marta Lombardini	(Italy) Camilla Gennaro (Italy) Angelica Raggi	(Czech Republic) Linda Ševčíková (Czech Republic) Brenda Fruhvirtová (Italy) Francesca Gandolfi (Italy) Marta Lombardini
September 8	Radom, Poland; Clay; W15; Singles and doubles draws	(Poland) Gina Feistel; 6–3, 4–6, 7–6^{(7–5)}	(Denmark) Rebecca Munk Mortensen	(United States) Mia Horvit (Germany) Sonja Zhenikhova	(Poland) Maja Pawelska (Czech Republic) Lucie Petruzelová (Belgium) Vicky Van de Peer (Poland) Oriana Gniewkowska
September 8	Radom, Poland; Clay; W15; Singles and doubles draws	(Poland) Maja Pawelska (Germany) Sonja Zhenikhova; 6–3, 7–6^{(7–4)}	(United States) Mia Horvit (United States) Malkia Ngounoue	(United States) Mia Horvit (Germany) Sonja Zhenikhova	(Poland) Maja Pawelska (Czech Republic) Lucie Petruzelová (Belgium) Vicky Van de Peer (Poland) Oriana Gniewkowska
September 8	Kuršumlijska Banja, Serbia; Clay; W15; Singles and doubles draws	(Serbia) Natalija Senić; 6–1, 6–1	(Romania) Giulia Safina Popa	(Bosnia and Herzegovina) Suana Tucaković; Alexandra Shubladze	(Serbia) Darja Suvirdjonkova; Rada Zolotareva (Serbia) Gala Ivanović (Romania) Patricia Georgiana Goina
September 8	Kuršumlijska Banja, Serbia; Clay; W15; Singles and doubles draws	Alexandra Shubladze; Rada Zolotareva; 6–2, 6–2	Felitsata Dorofeeva-Rybas (Serbia) Lana Virc	(Bosnia and Herzegovina) Suana Tucaković; Alexandra Shubladze	(Serbia) Darja Suvirdjonkova; Rada Zolotareva (Serbia) Gala Ivanović (Romania) Patricia Georgiana Goina
September 8	Heraklion, Greece; Hard; W15; Singles and doubles draws	(Italy) Federica Sacco; 6–4, 6–2	(Greece) Marianne Argyrokastriti	(Uzbekistan) Sevil Yuldasheva (India) Zeel Desai	(Italy) Lavinia Luciano; Valeriia Artemeva (Australia) Stefani Webb (Lithuania) Iveta Dapkutė
September 8	Heraklion, Greece; Hard; W15; Singles and doubles draws	(Greece) Marianne Argyrokastriti (Lithuania) Iveta Dapkutė; 6–1, 6–4	(Israel) Shira Buhadana (Czech Republic) Nikola Kopřivová	(Uzbekistan) Sevil Yuldasheva (India) Zeel Desai	(Italy) Lavinia Luciano; Valeriia Artemeva (Australia) Stefani Webb (Lithuania) Iveta Dapkutė
September 8	Kayseri, Turkiye; Hard; W15; Singles and doubles draws	(Australia) Alana Subasic; 6–3, 6–1	(France) Dune Vaissaud	(Turkey) Selina Atay; Ekaterina Yashina	(Switzerland) Ayline Samardzic (Colombia) María Herazo González (Uzbekistan) Milana Maslenkova (Turkey) İrem Kurt
September 8	Kayseri, Turkiye; Hard; W15; Singles and doubles draws	(Turkey) İrem Kurt (Ukraine) Adriana Tkachenko; 6–3, 7–6^{(7–2)}	(Netherlands) Coco Bosman (Turkey) Defne Çırpanlı	(Turkey) Selina Atay; Ekaterina Yashina	(Switzerland) Ayline Samardzic (Colombia) María Herazo González (Uzbekistan) Milana Maslenkova (Turkey) İrem Kurt
September 8	Hurghada, Egypt; Hard; W15; Singles and doubles draws	Daria Khomutsianskaya; 6–3, 6–3	(Egypt) Lamis Alhussein Abdel Aziz	(France) Louna Zoppas (Egypt) Nada Fouad	(Egypt) Yasmin Ezzat (Italy) Maddalena Giordano; Anna Kubareva (Ukraine) Daria Yesypchuk
September 8	Hurghada, Egypt; Hard; W15; Singles and doubles draws	Daria Khomutsianskaya; Anna Kubareva; 7–5, 6–1	Ekaterina Khodzhaeva; Ekaterina Maklakova	(France) Louna Zoppas (Egypt) Nada Fouad	(Egypt) Yasmin Ezzat (Italy) Maddalena Giordano; Anna Kubareva (Ukraine) Daria Yesypchuk
September 8	Monastir, Tunisia; Hard; W15; Singles and doubles draws	(United Kingdom) Alicia Dudeney; 6–1, 7–5	(Germany) Anna Petkovic	(Germany) Leonie Schuknecht (Spain) Noelia Bouzó Zanotti	(United States) Megan Heuser (United States) Raveena Kingsley; Victoria Milovanova (Italy) Arianna Zucchini
September 8	Monastir, Tunisia; Hard; W15; Singles and doubles draws	(United Kingdom) Alicia Dudeney (United States) Megan Heuser; 6–4, 6–7^{(6–8)}, [10–6]	(Canada) Raphaëlle Lacasse (South Africa) Nelise Verster	(Germany) Leonie Schuknecht (Spain) Noelia Bouzó Zanotti	(United States) Megan Heuser (United States) Raveena Kingsley; Victoria Milovanova (Italy) Arianna Zucchini
September 8	São Luís, Brazil; Clay; W15; Singles and doubles draws	(United States) Hibah Shaikh; 7–5, 6–2	(Argentina) Martina Capurro Taborda	(Italy) Beatrice Stagno (Brazil) Júlia Konishi Camargo Silva	(Mexico) Marian Gómez Pezuela Cano (Brazil) Sofia Mendonça (Romania) Maria Toma (Brazil) Jennifer Dourado
September 8	São Luís, Brazil; Clay; W15; Singles and doubles draws	(Brazil) Letícia Garcia Vidal (Brazil) Júlia Konishi Camargo Silva; Walkover	(Ecuador) Mell Reasco González (United States) Hibah Shaikh	(Italy) Beatrice Stagno (Brazil) Júlia Konishi Camargo Silva	(Mexico) Marian Gómez Pezuela Cano (Brazil) Sofia Mendonça (Romania) Maria Toma (Brazil) Jennifer Dourado
September 15	Serbian Tennis Tour; Kuršumlijska Banja, Serbia; Clay; W75; Singles and doubles draws	(Austria) Lilli Tagger; 5–7, 6–2, 6–2	Rada Zolotareva	(Brazil) Gabriela Cé (Serbia) Mia Ristić	(United Kingdom) Ranah Stoiber (Serbia) Draginja Vuković (Finland) Laura Hietaranta (North Macedonia) Lina Gjorcheska
September 15	Serbian Tennis Tour; Kuršumlijska Banja, Serbia; Clay; W75; Singles and doubles draws	(Poland) Weronika Falkowska (Czech Republic) Anna Sisková; 6–0, 7–5	(Czech Republic) Michaela Bayerlová (Greece) Martha Matoula	(Brazil) Gabriela Cé (Serbia) Mia Ristić	(United Kingdom) Ranah Stoiber (Serbia) Draginja Vuković (Finland) Laura Hietaranta (North Macedonia) Lina Gjorcheska
September 15	Pazardzhik Cup; Pazardzhik, Bulgaria; Clay; W50+H; Singles and doubles draws	(Bulgaria) Elizara Yaneva; 7–5, 6–3	(France) Séléna Janicijevic	(Turkey) Çağla Büyükakçay (Bulgaria) Lidia Encheva	(Romania) Andreea Prisăcariu; Sofya Lansere (Romania) Georgia Crăciun (Ukraine) Anastasiia Sobolieva
September 15	Pazardzhik Cup; Pazardzhik, Bulgaria; Clay; W50+H; Singles and doubles draws	(Bulgaria) Lia Karatancheva (Greece) Sapfo Sakellaridi; 6–2, 7–5	(France) Yara Bartashevich; Alevtina Ibragimova	(Turkey) Çağla Büyükakçay (Bulgaria) Lidia Encheva	(Romania) Andreea Prisăcariu; Sofya Lansere (Romania) Georgia Crăciun (Ukraine) Anastasiia Sobolieva
September 15	Wagga Wagga, Australia; Hard; W35; Singles and doubles draws	(Australia) Taylah Preston; 6–4, 7–6^{(7–5)}	(United Kingdom) Katie Swan	(Japan) Erika Sema (Japan) Hayu Kinoshita	(Australia) Cara Korhonen (Australia) Tahlia Kokkinis (Australia) Belle Thompson (Japan) Haruna Arakawa
September 15	Wagga Wagga, Australia; Hard; W35; Singles and doubles draws	(Japan) Hayu Kinoshita (Chinese Taipei) Yang Ya-yi; 6–1, 3–6, [10–8]	(Japan) Erika Sema (New Zealand) Elyse Tse	(Japan) Erika Sema (Japan) Hayu Kinoshita	(Australia) Cara Korhonen (Australia) Tahlia Kokkinis (Australia) Belle Thompson (Japan) Haruna Arakawa
September 15	Shenyang, China; Hard (i); W35; Singles and doubles draws	Aliona Falei; 7–6^{(8–6)}, 7–5	(China) Liu Fangzhou	(Japan) Saki Imamura; Kira Pavlova	(China) Zhu Chenting (China) Zhang Junhan (Japan) Hikaru Sato (China) Zheng Wushuang
September 15	Shenyang, China; Hard (i); W35; Singles and doubles draws	(Thailand) Peangtarn Plipuech (China) Zheng Wushuang; 6–3, 6–3	(China) Huang Yujia (China) Xiao Zhenghua	(Japan) Saki Imamura; Kira Pavlova	(China) Zhu Chenting (China) Zhang Junhan (Japan) Hikaru Sato (China) Zheng Wushuang
September 15	Santa Margherita di Pula, Italy; Clay; W35; Singles and doubles draws	(Sweden) Caijsa Hennemann; 7–5, 6–2	(Italy) Lisa Pigato	(Czech Republic) Julie Štruplová (Italy) Isabella Maria Șerban	(Italy) Gaia Maduzzi (Germany) Antonia Schmidt (Greece) Valentini Grammatikopoulou (Italy) Vittoria Paganetti
September 15	Santa Margherita di Pula, Italy; Clay; W35; Singles and doubles draws	(Greece) Valentini Grammatikopoulou (Germany) Antonia Schmidt; 7–6^{(7–5)}, 3–6, [10–7]	(Italy) Alessandra Mazzola (Czech Republic) Julie Štruplová	(Czech Republic) Julie Štruplová (Italy) Isabella Maria Șerban	(Italy) Gaia Maduzzi (Germany) Antonia Schmidt (Greece) Valentini Grammatikopoulou (Italy) Vittoria Paganetti
September 15	Monastir, Tunisia; Hard; W35; Singles and doubles draws	(France) Yasmine Mansouri; 6–2, 7–5	(United States) Carolyn Ansari	(United Kingdom) Naiktha Bains (United States) Sara Daavettila	(Austria) Ekaterina Perelygina (Slovakia) Katarína Kužmová; Victoria Milovanova (Spain) Noelia Bouzó Zanotti
September 15	Monastir, Tunisia; Hard; W35; Singles and doubles draws	(France) Yasmine Mansouri (Serbia) Elena Milovanović; 6–1, 6–1	(Switzerland) Alina Granwehr (Italy) Arianna Zucchini	(United Kingdom) Naiktha Bains (United States) Sara Daavettila	(Austria) Ekaterina Perelygina (Slovakia) Katarína Kužmová; Victoria Milovanova (Spain) Noelia Bouzó Zanotti
September 15	Gurugram, India; Hard; W15; Singles and doubles draws	(India) Zeel Desai; 2–6, 6–1, 6–4	(India) Shruti Ahlawat	(India) Akanksha Nitture (Malaysia) Shihomi Leong	(Singapore) Eva Marie Desvignes; Maria Mikhailova; Vlada Mincheva (United States) Paola Lopez
September 15	Gurugram, India; Hard; W15; Singles and doubles draws	(India) Sravya Chilakalapudi (India) Pranjala Yadlapalli; 6–4, 6–0	(India) Mahika Khanna (India) Sohini Sanjay Mohanty	(India) Akanksha Nitture (Malaysia) Shihomi Leong	(Singapore) Eva Marie Desvignes; Maria Mikhailova; Vlada Mincheva (United States) Paola Lopez
September 15	Ceuta, Spain; Hard; W15; Singles and doubles draws	(Spain) Aran Teixidó García; 6–4, 7–6^{(7–3)}	(United States) Kate Mansfield	(Spain) Lorena Solar Donoso (Spain) Ariadna Garcia-Patrón Canals	(France) Astrid Cirotte (Italy) Valentina Losciale (Romania) Gabriela Maria Vancea (Spain) Claudia Ferrer Pérez
September 15	Ceuta, Spain; Hard; W15; Singles and doubles draws	(Germany) Elena Giovanna Giessler (Spain) Maria Oliver Sanchez; 7–6^{(7–4)}, 3–6, [10–5]	(Spain) Carmen Gallardo Guevara (Spain) Ariadna Garcia-Patrón Canals	(Spain) Lorena Solar Donoso (Spain) Ariadna Garcia-Patrón Canals	(France) Astrid Cirotte (Italy) Valentina Losciale (Romania) Gabriela Maria Vancea (Spain) Claudia Ferrer Pérez
September 15	Nogent-sur-Marne, France; Clay; W15; Singles and doubles draws	(Poland) Anna Hertel; 5–7, 6–2, 6–4	(France) Lucie Nguyen Tan	(Latvia) Diāna Marcinkēviča (Belgium) Tamila Gadamauri	(France) Mathilde Lollia (France) Savine Erler (Germany) Luisa Meyer auf der Heide (Germany) Mina Hodzic
September 15	Nogent-sur-Marne, France; Clay; W15; Singles and doubles draws	(France) Lucie Nguyen Tan; Kseniya Yersh; 6–0, 6–4	(Ukraine) Anastasia Firman (Ukraine) Polina Skliar	(Latvia) Diāna Marcinkēviča (Belgium) Tamila Gadamauri	(France) Mathilde Lollia (France) Savine Erler (Germany) Luisa Meyer auf der Heide (Germany) Mina Hodzic
September 15	Kayseri, Turkiye; Hard; W15; Singles and doubles draws	(United States) Julia Adams; 3–6, 7–6^{(7–2)}, 7–5	(Estonia) Elena Malõgina	(Australia) Alana Subasic (Ukraine) Adriana Tkachenko	(Ukraine) Mariia Bergen (Latvia) Daniela Dārta Feldmane (Netherlands) Coco Bosman (France) Dune Vaissaud
September 15	Kayseri, Turkiye; Hard; W15; Singles and doubles draws	(United States) Julia Adams (United States) Shria Atturu; 7–6^{(7–3)}, 6–3	(Turkey) Selina Atay (Germany) Ann Akasha Ceuca	(Australia) Alana Subasic (Ukraine) Adriana Tkachenko	(Ukraine) Mariia Bergen (Latvia) Daniela Dārta Feldmane (Netherlands) Coco Bosman (France) Dune Vaissaud
September 15	Heraklion, Greece; Hard; W15; Singles and doubles draws	(Australia) Stefani Webb; 6–0, 6–3	(Lithuania) Iveta Dapkutė	(Germany) Mariella Thamm (Ukraine) Kateryna Diatlova	(United Kingdom) Jizel Matos Sequeira Fernandes (Sweden) Fanny Norin; Valeriia Artemeva (Slovakia) Tamara Šramková
September 15	Heraklion, Greece; Hard; W15; Singles and doubles draws	(Greece) Marianne Argyrokastriti (Lithuania) Iveta Dapkutė; 2–6, 7–6^{(7–4)}, [12–10]	(Germany) Laura Böhner (Germany) Angelina Wirges	(Germany) Mariella Thamm (Ukraine) Kateryna Diatlova	(United Kingdom) Jizel Matos Sequeira Fernandes (Sweden) Fanny Norin; Valeriia Artemeva (Slovakia) Tamara Šramková
September 15	Hurghada, Egypt; Hard; W15; Singles and doubles draws	Daria Khomutsianskaya; 6–4, 6–3	(Egypt) Sandra Samir	Anna Kubareva (Egypt) Lamis Alhussein Abdel Aziz	(Egypt) Nada Fouad (Ukraine) Daria Yesypchuk (Egypt) Yasmin Ezzat; Ekaterina Maklakova
September 15	Hurghada, Egypt; Hard; W15; Singles and doubles draws	(Egypt) Lamis Alhussein Abdel Aziz (Germany) Anja Wildgruber; 6–3, 7–6^{(7–5)}	Daria Khomutsianskaya; Anna Kubareva	Anna Kubareva (Egypt) Lamis Alhussein Abdel Aziz	(Egypt) Nada Fouad (Ukraine) Daria Yesypchuk (Egypt) Yasmin Ezzat; Ekaterina Maklakova
September 15	Luján, Argentina; Clay; W15; Singles and doubles draws	(Argentina) Martina Capurro Taborda; 7–5, 6–4	(Argentina) María Florencia Urrutia	(Bolivia) Noelia Zeballos (Argentina) Carla Markus	(Argentina) Jazmín Ortenzi (Argentina) Luna María Cinalli (Chile) Fernanda Labraña (Liechtenstein) Sylvie Zünd
September 15	Luján, Argentina; Clay; W15; Singles and doubles draws	(Argentina) Martina Capurro Taborda (Chile) Fernanda Labraña; 6–2, 7–6^{(7–4)}	(Argentina) Luciana Moyano (Ecuador) Camila Romero	(Bolivia) Noelia Zeballos (Argentina) Carla Markus	(Argentina) Jazmín Ortenzi (Argentina) Luna María Cinalli (Chile) Fernanda Labraña (Liechtenstein) Sylvie Zünd
September 22	Incheon Open; Incheon, South Korea; Hard; W100; Singles – Doubles	(Japan) Nao Hibino; 7–5, 7–6^{(7–2)}	(South Korea) Lee Eun-hye	(Japan) Sara Saito (Japan) Haruka Kaji	(South Korea) Ku Yeon-woo (China) Dang Yiming (Japan) Miho Kuramochi (Japan) Saki Imamura
September 22	Incheon Open; Incheon, South Korea; Hard; W100; Singles – Doubles	(Japan) Saki Imamura (South Korea) Park So-hyun; 6–3, 4–6, [10–7]	(Japan) Hiroko Kuwata (Indonesia) Priska Nugroho	(Japan) Sara Saito (Japan) Haruka Kaji	(South Korea) Ku Yeon-woo (China) Dang Yiming (Japan) Miho Kuramochi (Japan) Saki Imamura
September 22	Lisboa Belém Open; Lisbon, Portugal; Clay; W100; Singles – Doubles	(Switzerland) Simona Waltert; 6–2, 6–1	(Latvia) Darja Semeņistaja	(Austria) Julia Grabher; Oksana Selekhmeteva	(Spain) Guiomar Maristany (Slovenia) Tamara Zidanšek (Italy) Camilla Rosatello (Belgium) Hanne Vandewinkel
September 22	Lisboa Belém Open; Lisbon, Portugal; Clay; W100; Singles – Doubles	(Portugal) Matilde Jorge (Switzerland) Naïma Karamoko; 6–2, 6–3	(Slovenia) Dalila Jakupović (Slovenia) Nika Radišić	(Austria) Julia Grabher; Oksana Selekhmeteva	(Spain) Guiomar Maristany (Slovenia) Tamara Zidanšek (Italy) Camilla Rosatello (Belgium) Hanne Vandewinkel
September 22	Central Coast Pro Tennis Open; Templeton, United States; Hard; W75; Singles – Doubles	(United States) Kayla Day; 6–2, 3–0 ret.	(Canada) Kayla Cross	(United States) Emina Bektas (Australia) Olivia Gadecki	(United States) Mary Stoiana (United States) Claire Liu (Slovakia) Viktória Hrunčáková (United States) Katrina Scott
September 22	Central Coast Pro Tennis Open; Templeton, United States; Hard; W75; Singles – Doubles	Maria Kozyreva (Slovakia) Martina Okáľová; 6–2, 7–5	(United States) Usue Maitane Arconada (Slovakia) Viktória Hrunčáková	(United States) Emina Bektas (Australia) Olivia Gadecki	(United States) Mary Stoiana (United States) Claire Liu (Slovakia) Viktória Hrunčáková (United States) Katrina Scott
September 22	Pazardzhik Cup; Pazardzhik, Bulgaria; Clay; W50+H; Singles and doubles draws	(Czech Republic) Laura Samson; 6–2, 6–3	(Spain) Andrea Lázaro García	(Bulgaria) Elizara Yaneva (Greece) Despina Papamichail	(Romania) Elena Ruxandra Bertea (Croatia) Lea Bošković; Daria Lodikova (Spain) Cristina Díaz Adrover
September 22	Pazardzhik Cup; Pazardzhik, Bulgaria; Clay; W50+H; Singles and doubles draws	(Bulgaria) Lia Karatancheva (Greece) Sapfo Sakellaridi; 6–7^{(5–7)}, 6–4, [10–5]	(Romania) Elena Ruxandra Bertea; Daria Lodikova	(Bulgaria) Elizara Yaneva (Greece) Despina Papamichail	(Romania) Elena Ruxandra Bertea (Croatia) Lea Bošković; Daria Lodikova (Spain) Cristina Díaz Adrover
September 22	Reus, Spain; Clay; W35; Singles and doubles draws	(Croatia) Lucija Ćirić Bagarić; 6–1, 3–6, 6–1	(Spain) Aliona Bolsova	(Spain) Irene Burillo (Spain) Marina Bassols Ribera	(Germany) Eva Marie Voracek; Ekaterina Kazionova (Peru) Yleymi Muelle Valdez (Spain) Ángela Fita Boluda
September 22	Reus, Spain; Clay; W35; Singles and doubles draws	(Hungary) Adrienn Nagy (Germany) Joëlle Steur; 6–1, 3–6, [11–9]	(Croatia) Lucija Ćirić Bagarić (France) Tiphanie Lemaître	(Spain) Irene Burillo (Spain) Marina Bassols Ribera	(Germany) Eva Marie Voracek; Ekaterina Kazionova (Peru) Yleymi Muelle Valdez (Spain) Ángela Fita Boluda
September 22	Santa Margherita di Pula, Italy; Clay; W35; Singles and doubles draws	(Italy) Jennifer Ruggeri; 6–4, 6–2	(France) Sara Cakarevic	(Italy) Vittoria Paganetti (Sweden) Caijsa Hennemann	(Italy) Giorgia Pedone (Czech Republic) Julie Štruplová (France) Alice Tubello (Italy) Noemi Basiletti
September 22	Santa Margherita di Pula, Italy; Clay; W35; Singles and doubles draws	(Italy) Noemi Basiletti (Italy) Giorgia Pedone; 6–2, 6–7^{(6–8)}, [10–8]	(Italy) Marta Lombardini (Italy) Jennifer Ruggeri	(Italy) Vittoria Paganetti (Sweden) Caijsa Hennemann	(Italy) Giorgia Pedone (Czech Republic) Julie Štruplová (France) Alice Tubello (Italy) Noemi Basiletti
September 22	Monastir, Tunisia; Hard; W35; Singles and doubles draws	(United Kingdom) Harriet Dart; 6–1, 3–6, 6–2	(Switzerland) Alina Granwehr	(Czech Republic) Vendula Valdmannová (United Kingdom) Mika Stojsavljevic	(Switzerland) Susan Bandecchi (Bulgaria) Isabella Shinikova (United States) Alexis Blokhina (United States) Carolyn Ansari
September 22	Monastir, Tunisia; Hard; W35; Singles and doubles draws	(Poland) Martyna Kubka (Slovakia) Katarína Kužmová; 7–5, 6–4	(United States) Carolyn Ansari (Canada) Ariana Arseneault	(Czech Republic) Vendula Valdmannová (United Kingdom) Mika Stojsavljevic	(Switzerland) Susan Bandecchi (Bulgaria) Isabella Shinikova (United States) Alexis Blokhina (United States) Carolyn Ansari
September 22	Berkeley Tennis Club Challenge; Berkeley, United States; Hard; W35; Singles and doubles draws	(Egypt) Merna Refaat; 4–6, 7–5, 6–1	(Denmark) Johanne Svendsen	(Poland) Zuzanna Pawlikowska (United States) Anne Christine Lütkemeyer Obregon	(United States) Alexis Nguyen (United States) Malaika Rapolu (United States) Akasha Urhobo (United States) Aspen Schuman
September 22	Berkeley Tennis Club Challenge; Berkeley, United States; Hard; W35; Singles and doubles draws	(United States) Rasheeda McAdoo (Kenya) Angella Okutoyi; 7–6^{(7–2)}, 6–4	(Italy) Francesca Pace (Poland) Zuzanna Pawlikowska	(Poland) Zuzanna Pawlikowska (United States) Anne Christine Lütkemeyer Obregon	(United States) Alexis Nguyen (United States) Malaika Rapolu (United States) Akasha Urhobo (United States) Aspen Schuman
September 22	Gurugram, India; Hard; W15; Singles and doubles draws	Vlada Mincheva; 6–3, 6–4	(Malaysia) Shihomi Leong	(South Korea) Shin Ji-ho; Sofiia Suslova	(India) Zeel Desai; Maria Mikhailova (Singapore) Eva Marie Desvignes (India) Akanksha Nitture
September 22	Gurugram, India; Hard; W15; Singles and doubles draws	(Malaysia) Shihomi Leong (South Korea) Shin Ji-ho; 6–4, 6–3	(India) Akanksha Nitture (India) Soha Sadiq	(South Korea) Shin Ji-ho; Sofiia Suslova	(India) Zeel Desai; Maria Mikhailova (Singapore) Eva Marie Desvignes (India) Akanksha Nitture
September 22	Cap d'Agde, France; Clay; W15; Singles and doubles draws	(Ukraine) Yelyzaveta Kotliar; 6–2, 6–2	(Switzerland) Fiona Ganz	(Bulgaria) Gergana Topalova (France) Ophélie Boullay	(United Kingdom) Allegra Korpanec Davies (Poland) Anna Hertel; Kseniia Ruchkina (Germany) Sina Herrmann
September 22	Cap d'Agde, France; Clay; W15; Singles and doubles draws	(France) Ophélie Boullay; Kseniia Ruchkina; 6–4, 6–3	(Spain) Ana Giraldi Requena; Anastasia Mozgaleva	(Bulgaria) Gergana Topalova (France) Ophélie Boullay	(United Kingdom) Allegra Korpanec Davies (Poland) Anna Hertel; Kseniia Ruchkina (Germany) Sina Herrmann
September 22	Câmpulung, Romania; Clay; W15; Singles and doubles draws	(Romania) Anamaria Oana; 6–4, 6–4	(Romania) Mara Gae	(Italy) Enola Chiesa (Belgium) Tilwith Di Girolami	(Romania) Diana-Ioana Simionescu (Bulgaria) Lidia Encheva (Romania) Maia Ilinca Burcescu (Romania) Patricia Georgiana Goina
September 22	Câmpulung, Romania; Clay; W15; Singles and doubles draws	(Romania) Alesia Breaz (Romania) Cristiana Nicoleta Todoni; 6–2, 7–5	(Italy) Enola Chiesa (Belgium) Tilwith Di Girolami	(Italy) Enola Chiesa (Belgium) Tilwith Di Girolami	(Romania) Diana-Ioana Simionescu (Bulgaria) Lidia Encheva (Romania) Maia Ilinca Burcescu (Romania) Patricia Georgiana Goina
September 22	Kayseri, Turkiye; Hard; W15; Singles and doubles draws	(Germany) Ann Akasha Ceuca; 6–4, 6–2	(United States) Julia Adams	(Canada) Ana Grubor (Ukraine) Adriana Tkachenko	(Turkey) İrem Kurt (United States) Savannah Broadus; Evgeniya Burdina (Japan) Mutsumi Uemura
September 22	Kayseri, Turkiye; Hard; W15; Singles and doubles draws	(United States) Savannah Broadus (India) Madhurima Sawant; 7–6^{(7–2)}, 6–3	(Turkey) Selina Atay (Ukraine) Mariia Bergen	(Canada) Ana Grubor (Ukraine) Adriana Tkachenko	(Turkey) İrem Kurt (United States) Savannah Broadus; Evgeniya Burdina (Japan) Mutsumi Uemura
September 22	Sharm El Sheikh, Egypt; Hard; W15; Singles and doubles draws	(Lithuania) Andrė Lukošiūtė; 6–1, 3–1 ret.	Kira Bataikina	(Italy) Gaia Squarcialupi (Georgia (country)) Zoziya Kardava	Sofia Martianova; Ekaterina Tupitsyna (Ukraine) Daria Yesypchuk (Egypt) Yasmin Ezzat
September 22	Sharm El Sheikh, Egypt; Hard; W15; Singles and doubles draws	(Latvia) Kamilla Bartone (Netherlands) Madelief Hageman; 6–0, 6–3	(Denmark) Sarafina Hansen (Finland) Stella Remander	(Italy) Gaia Squarcialupi (Georgia (country)) Zoziya Kardava	Sofia Martianova; Ekaterina Tupitsyna (Ukraine) Daria Yesypchuk (Egypt) Yasmin Ezzat
September 22	Luján, Argentina; Clay; W15; Singles and doubles draws	(Argentina) Martina Capurro Taborda; 3–6, 7–6^{(7–1)}, 6–4	(Chile) Fernanda Labraña	(Argentina) María Florencia Urrutia (Argentina) Luna Maria Cinalli	(Argentina) Jazmín Ortenzi (Bolivia) Noelia Zeballos (Chile) Antonia Vergara Rivera (Argentina) Victoria Bosio
September 22	Luján, Argentina; Clay; W15; Singles and doubles draws	(Argentina) Luciana Moyano (Ecuador) Camila Romero; 6–3, 7–5	(Argentina) Justina María González Daniele (Chile) Fernanda Labraña	(Argentina) María Florencia Urrutia (Argentina) Luna Maria Cinalli	(Argentina) Jazmín Ortenzi (Bolivia) Noelia Zeballos (Chile) Antonia Vergara Rivera (Argentina) Victoria Bosio
September 29	Slovak Open; Bratislava, Slovakia; Hard (i); W75; Singles and doubles draws	Alina Korneeva; 7–6^{(9–7)}, 7–5	(Czech Republic) Lucie Havlíčková	(Slovakia) Mia Pohánková (Ukraine) Daria Snigur	Julia Avdeeva (Czech Republic) Gabriela Knutson; Sofya Lansere (Slovakia) Katarína Kužmová
September 29	Slovak Open; Bratislava, Slovakia; Hard (i); W75; Singles and doubles draws	(Czech Republic) Lucie Havlíčková (United Kingdom) Lily Miyazaki; 3–6, 6–3, [11–9]	(Poland) Martyna Kubka (Czech Republic) Aneta Laboutková	(Slovakia) Mia Pohánková (Ukraine) Daria Snigur	Julia Avdeeva (Czech Republic) Gabriela Knutson; Sofya Lansere (Slovakia) Katarína Kužmová
September 29	Bucharest, Romania; Clay; W75; Singles and doubles draws	(Italy) Camilla Rosatello; 5–7, 6–3, 6–4	(Romania) Elena Ruxandra Bertea	Alevtina Ibragimova (Netherlands) Arantxa Rus	(Burundi) Sada Nahimana (Romania) Miriam Bulgaru (Serbia) Mia Ristić (France) Alice Ramé
September 29	Bucharest, Romania; Clay; W75; Singles and doubles draws	(Romania) Oana Gavrilă (Greece) Sapfo Sakellaridi; 6–4, 6–2	(Romania) Mara Gae (Netherlands) Arantxa Rus	Alevtina Ibragimova (Netherlands) Arantxa Rus	(Burundi) Sada Nahimana (Romania) Miriam Bulgaru (Serbia) Mia Ristić (France) Alice Ramé
September 29	Baza, Spain; Hard; W50; Singles and doubles draws	(Spain) Eva Guerrero Álvarez; 7–6^{(7–1)}, 7–5	(Spain) Marina Bassols Ribera	(Switzerland) Susan Bandecchi (Spain) Noelia Bouzó Zanotti	(France) Yasmine Mansouri (Germany) Joëlle Steur (United States) Alexis Blokhina (Italy) Camilla Zanolini
September 29	Baza, Spain; Hard; W50; Singles and doubles draws	(Spain) Noelia Bouzó Zanotti (Germany) Joëlle Steur; 7–6^{(7–4)}, 7–6^{(7–2)}	(Serbia) Mila Mašić (Spain) Maria Oliver Sanchez	(Switzerland) Susan Bandecchi (Spain) Noelia Bouzó Zanotti	(France) Yasmine Mansouri (Germany) Joëlle Steur (United States) Alexis Blokhina (Italy) Camilla Zanolini
September 29	Rancho Santa Fe Open; Rancho Santa Fe, United States; Hard; W50; Singles and doubles draws	(Australia) Olivia Gadecki; 2–6, 6–2, 4–1 ret.	(Australia) Emerson Jones	(United States) Katrina Scott; Iryna Shymanovich	(United States) Emina Bektas (Japan) Himeno Sakatsume (United States) Julieta Pareja (United States) Elizabeth Mandlik
September 29	Rancho Santa Fe Open; Rancho Santa Fe, United States; Hard; W50; Singles and doubles draws	(Japan) Himeno Sakatsume (Japan) Wakana Sonobe; 7–6^{(7–5)}, 3–6, [10–5]	(United States) Fiona Crawley (United States) Jaeda Daniel	(United States) Katrina Scott; Iryna Shymanovich	(United States) Emina Bektas (Japan) Himeno Sakatsume (United States) Julieta Pareja (United States) Elizabeth Mandlik
September 29	Darwin, Australia; Hard; W35; Singles and doubles draws	(Australia) Taylah Preston; 7–6^{(7–3)}, 6–3	(Japan) Shiho Akita	(Australia) Gabriella Da Silva-Fick (South Korea) Jang Su-jeong	(Australia) Sarah Rokusek (Australia) Laquisa Khan (Australia) Elena Micic (Australia) Jizelle Sibai
September 29	Darwin, Australia; Hard; W35; Singles and doubles draws	(New Zealand) Monique Barry (Australia) Gabriella Da Silva-Fick; 6–3, 7–6^{(9–7)}	(United Kingdom) Brooke Black (Japan) Reina Goto	(Australia) Gabriella Da Silva-Fick (South Korea) Jang Su-jeong	(Australia) Sarah Rokusek (Australia) Laquisa Khan (Australia) Elena Micic (Australia) Jizelle Sibai
September 29	Reims, France; Hard (i); W35; Singles and doubles draws	Alexandra Shubladze; 6–4, 6–4	(Ukraine) Veronika Podrez	(France) Manon Léonard (France) Kim Chiarello	(France) Océane Dodin (Netherlands) Sarah van Emst (Netherlands) Stéphanie Visscher (Belgium) Jeline Vandromme
September 29	Reims, France; Hard (i); W35; Singles and doubles draws	(Netherlands) Joy de Zeeuw (Netherlands) Sarah van Emst; 6–3, 6–4	(Switzerland) Jenny Dürst (France) Marie Mattel	(France) Manon Léonard (France) Kim Chiarello	(France) Océane Dodin (Netherlands) Sarah van Emst (Netherlands) Stéphanie Visscher (Belgium) Jeline Vandromme
September 29	Santa Margherita di Pula, Italy; Clay; W35; Singles and doubles draws	(Germany) Katharina Hobgarski; 6–4, 6–1	(Germany) Antonia Schmidt	(Germany) Julia Stusek (Italy) Jennifer Ruggeri	(Croatia) Tena Lukas (Germany) Anna Petkovic (Italy) Samira De Stefano (Italy) Giorgia Pedone
September 29	Santa Margherita di Pula, Italy; Clay; W35; Singles and doubles draws	(Sweden) Caijsa Hennemann (Sweden) Lisa Zaar; 6–3, 6–3	(Italy) Noemi Basiletti (Italy) Gaia Maduzzi	(Germany) Julia Stusek (Italy) Jennifer Ruggeri	(Croatia) Tena Lukas (Germany) Anna Petkovic (Italy) Samira De Stefano (Italy) Giorgia Pedone
September 29	Monastir, Tunisia; Hard; W35; Singles and doubles draws	(Czech Republic) Vendula Valdmannová; 6–1, 6–1	(United Kingdom) Mika Stojsavljevic	(Serbia) Elena Milovanović (Egypt) Sandra Samir	(United Kingdom) Amarni Banks (United Kingdom) Naiktha Bains (United States) Sara Daavettila (Switzerland) Alina Granwehr
September 29	Monastir, Tunisia; Hard; W35; Singles and doubles draws	(United Kingdom) Mika Stojsavljevic (Czech Republic) Vendula Valdmannová; 6–4, 6–4	(United Kingdom) Lauryn John-Baptiste (Egypt) Sandra Samir	(Serbia) Elena Milovanović (Egypt) Sandra Samir	(United Kingdom) Amarni Banks (United Kingdom) Naiktha Bains (United States) Sara Daavettila (Switzerland) Alina Granwehr
September 29	São Paulo Torneio Internacional de Tênis Feminino; São Paulo, Brazil; Clay; W35; Singles and doubles draws	(Brazil) Laura Pigossi; 5–7, 7–5, 6–2	(Brazil) Carolina Alves	(Brazil) Gabriela Cé (Argentina) Jazmín Ortenzi	(Brazil) Thaísa Grana Pedretti (Chile) Antonia Vergara Rivera (Brazil) Ana Candiotto (Italy) Miriana Tona
September 29	São Paulo Torneio Internacional de Tênis Feminino; São Paulo, Brazil; Clay; W35; Singles and doubles draws	(Brazil) Ana Candiotto (Brazil) Nauhany Vitória Leme da Silva; 6–4, 6–2	(Argentina) Jazmín Ortenzi (Colombia) María Paulina Pérez	(Brazil) Gabriela Cé (Argentina) Jazmín Ortenzi	(Brazil) Thaísa Grana Pedretti (Chile) Antonia Vergara Rivera (Brazil) Ana Candiotto (Italy) Miriana Tona
September 29	San Rafael, United States; Hard; W35; Singles and doubles draws	(United States) Madison Brengle; 7–6^{(11–9)}, 6–0	(Peru) Lucciana Pérez Alarcón	(United States) Lea Ma (Denmark) Johanne Svendsen	(Italy) Diletta Cherubini (Serbia) Katarina Jokić (Germany) Carolina Kuhl (United States) Madison Sieg
September 29	San Rafael, United States; Hard; W35; Singles and doubles draws	(Italy) Francesca Pace (Poland) Zuzanna Pawlikowska; 4–6, 6–3, [10–5]	(Slovenia) Živa Falkner (Luxembourg) Marie Weckerle	(United States) Lea Ma (Denmark) Johanne Svendsen	(Italy) Diletta Cherubini (Serbia) Katarina Jokić (Germany) Carolina Kuhl (United States) Madison Sieg
September 29	Varna, Bulgaria; Clay; W15; Singles and doubles draws	(Germany) Eva Bennemann; 7–5, 6–2	(Serbia) Anastasija Cvetković	(Romania) Giulia Safina Popa (Bulgaria) Yoana Konstantinova	(Romania) Ilinca Sagmar (Germany) Eva Marie Voracek (Austria) Mavie Österreicher (Romania) Alexis Lavinia Puiac
September 29	Varna, Bulgaria; Clay; W15; Singles and doubles draws	(Germany) Eva Bennemann (Germany) Laura Böhner; 6–4, 6–3	(Spain) Sara Dols (Ukraine) Anastasiya Zaparyniuk	(Romania) Giulia Safina Popa (Bulgaria) Yoana Konstantinova	(Romania) Ilinca Sagmar (Germany) Eva Marie Voracek (Austria) Mavie Österreicher (Romania) Alexis Lavinia Puiac
September 29	Šibenik, Croatia; Clay; W15; Singles and doubles draws	(Croatia) Ana Konjuh; 6–2, 6–2	(Slovenia) Pia Lovrič	(United States) Mia Horvit (Finland) Ella Haavisto	(Serbia) Lana Virc (Czech Republic) Lenka Munzarová (Brazil) Victoria Luiza Barros (Croatia) Ana Petković
September 29	Šibenik, Croatia; Clay; W15; Singles and doubles draws	(Slovakia) Laura Svatíková (Czech Republic) Eliška Ticháčková; 6–3, 6–1	(United States) Mia Horvit (Switzerland) Marie Mettraux	(United States) Mia Horvit (Finland) Ella Haavisto	(Serbia) Lana Virc (Czech Republic) Lenka Munzarová (Brazil) Victoria Luiza Barros (Croatia) Ana Petković
September 29	Kayseri, Turkiye; Hard; W15; Singles and doubles draws	(United States) Julia Adams; 6–0, 7–5	Alisa Vasileva	(Germany) Ann Akasha Ceuca (United States) Savannah Broadus	(Turkey) İrem Kurt (Serbia) Darja Suvirdjonkova (Canada) Ana Grubor (United Kingdom) Esther Adeshina
September 29	Kayseri, Turkiye; Hard; W15; Singles and doubles draws	(United States) Savannah Broadus (Belgium) Kaat Coppez; 6–4, 4–6, [12–10]	(United Kingdom) Esther Adeshina (Australia) Tenika McGiffin	(Germany) Ann Akasha Ceuca (United States) Savannah Broadus	(Turkey) İrem Kurt (Serbia) Darja Suvirdjonkova (Canada) Ana Grubor (United Kingdom) Esther Adeshina
September 29	Sharm El Sheikh, Egypt; Hard; W15; Singles and doubles draws	(Latvia) Kamilla Bartone; 7–6^{(7–5)}, 5–7, 7–6^{(7–5)}	(Lithuania) Andrė Lukošiūtė	(Egypt) Yasmin Ezzat (Georgia (country)) Zoziya Kardava	(Czech Republic) Amelie Justine Hejtmanek (Germany) Anja Wildgruber (Netherlands) Madelief Hageman (China) Hu Feier
September 29	Sharm El Sheikh, Egypt; Hard; W15; Singles and doubles draws	(Latvia) Kamilla Bartone (Netherlands) Madelief Hageman; 7–6^{(7–3)}, 4–6, [10–8]	(Kazakhstan) Asylzhan Arystanbekova (Kazakhstan) Ingkar Dyussebay	(Egypt) Yasmin Ezzat (Georgia (country)) Zoziya Kardava	(Czech Republic) Amelie Justine Hejtmanek (Germany) Anja Wildgruber (Netherlands) Madelief Hageman (China) Hu Feier
September 29	Santa Tecla, El Salvador; Hard; W15; Singles and doubles draws	(France) Sophia Biolay; 6–4, 6–0	(Ecuador) Mell Reasco González	(United States) Dasha Ivanova (United States) Chukwumelije Clarke	(Colombia) María Torres Murcia (Netherlands) Merel Hoedt (United States) Misa Malkin (United States) Kailey Evans
September 29	Santa Tecla, El Salvador; Hard; W15; Singles and doubles draws	(Colombia) María Herazo González (United States) Dasha Ivanova; 6–4, 7–5	(France) Sophia Biolay (France) Jade Bornay	(United States) Dasha Ivanova (United States) Chukwumelije Clarke	(Colombia) María Torres Murcia (Netherlands) Merel Hoedt (United States) Misa Malkin (United States) Kailey Evans
