= 2024 Ladies Open Vienna =

Tennis tournament

- Date: 2–8 September 2024
- Edition: 18th
- Category: ITF Women's World Tennis Tour
- Prize money: $60,000
- Surface: Clay / Outdoor
- Location: Vienna, Austria; 48.155897°N 16.318271°E

Champions

Singles
- (Croatia) Tena Lukas

Doubles
- (United Kingdom) Emily Appleton / (France) Estelle Cascino
- Ladies Open Vienna

The 2024 Ladies Open Vienna was a professional tennis tournament played on outdoor clay courts. It was the eighteenth edition of the tournament, which was part of the 2024 ITF Women's World Tennis Tour. It took place in Vienna, Austria, between 2 and 8 September 2024.

== Champions ==
=== Singles ===
- (Croatia) Tena Lukas def. (Bulgaria) Lia Karatancheva, 6–4, 6–1

=== Doubles ===
- (United Kingdom) Emily Appleton / (France) Estelle Cascino def. (Ukraine) Maryna Kolb / (Ukraine) Nadiia Kolb, 6–4, 7–6^{(7–1)}

== Singles main draw entrants ==
=== Seeds ===
Country	Player	Rank	Seed
~~HUN~~	~~Panna Udvardy~~	~~127~~	~~1~~
ESP	Leyre Romero Gormaz	174	2
CRO	Lucija Ćirić Bagarić	178	3
POL	Katarzyna Kawa	181	4
UKR	Anastasiia Sobolieva	205	5
MKD	Lina Gjorcheska	206	6
CZE	Barbora Palicová	222	7
SLO	Dalila Jakupović	237	8
ITA	Nuria Brancaccio	241	9

- Rankings are as of 26 August 2024.

=== Other entrants ===
The following players received wildcards into the singles main draw:

- (Austria) Julia Grabher
- (Austria) Arabella Koller
- (Austria) Tamara Kostic
- ~~(Austria) Anna Pircher~~

The following players received entry into the singles main draw using special rankings:

- (Italy) Matilde Paoletti
- (Germany) Nastasja Schunk

The following players received entry from the qualifying draw:

- Victoria Kan
- (Bulgaria) Lia Karatancheva
- Ekaterina Maklakova
- (Canada) Victoria Mboko
- (Hungary) Adrienn Nagy
- (Mexico) María Portillo Ramírez
- (Croatia) Iva Primorac
- (Italy) Jennifer Ruggeri

The following players received entry as a lucky loser:

- (Germany) Selina Dal
- (Italy) Arianna Zucchini
