= 2025 Ladies Open Vienna – Doubles =

Doubles
- 2025 Ladies Open Vienna

Final
- Champions: (Poland) Gina Feistel (Poland) Marcelina Podlińska
- Runners-up: (United Kingdom) Madeleine Brooks (Slovenia) Dalila Jakupović
- Score: 2–6, 7–6^{(7–3)}, [10–8]

Events
Singles	Doubles
← 2024 ·	Ladies Open Vienna	· 2026 →

Emily Appleton and Estelle Cascino were the defending champions but chose not to participate.

Gina Feistel and Marcelina Podlińska won the title, after defeating Madeleine Brooks and Dalila Jakupović 2–6, 7–6^{(7–3)}, [10–8] in the final.

== Seeds ==
1. (United Kingdom) Madeleine Brooks / (Slovenia) Dalila Jakupović (final)
2. (United Kingdom) Freya Christie / (Bosnia and Herzegovina) Anita Wagner (semifinals)
3. (Ukraine) Maryna Kolb / (Ukraine) Nadiia Kolb (quarterfinals, retired)
4. (Spain) Ángela Fita Boluda / (Switzerland) Ylena In-Albon (quarterfinals, withdrew)

== Draw ==
=== Key ===
- Q = Qualifier
- WC = Wild card
- LL = Lucky loser
- Alt = Alternate
- ITF = ITF entry
- PR = Protected ranking
- SR = Special ranking
- SE = Special exempt
- JE = Junior exempt
- JR = Junior Accelerator Programme entrant
- CO = College Accelerator Programme entrant
- NG = Next Gen Accelerator Program entrant
- w/o = Walkover
- r = Retired
- d = Defaulted

First round
1	(United Kingdom) M Brooks (Slovenia) D Jakupović	6	6
WC	(Austria) C Gasparovic (Austria) L Rabl	4	2
(Finland) L Hietaranta (Serbia) A Stanković	6	7^{7}
(Turkey) İ Öz (Spain) L Romero Gormaz	3	6^{3}
4	(Spain) Á Fita Boluda (Switzerland) Y In-Albon	5	2
(Italy) S De Stefano (Italy) A Mazzola	7	1^{r}
(Serbia) M Mašić (Austria) EL Picorusevic	4	6^{6}
(Croatia) M Dražić (Hungary) A Nagy	6	7^{8}
WC	(Austria) AM Glaser (Czech Republic) E Harajda	2	0
(Poland) G Feistel (Poland) M Podlińska	6	6
WC	(Latvia) D Marcinkēviča (Austria) L Ramharter	2	2
3	(Ukraine) M Kolb (Ukraine) N Kolb	6	6
(Italy) G Pedone (Ukraine) A Sobolieva	3	2
(Croatia) I Primorac Pavičić (Slovakia) R Zelníčková	6	6
(Austria) LM Rothensteiner (Austria) A Schüller	6^{4}	2
2	(United Kingdom) F Christie (Bosnia and Herzegovina) A Wagner	7^{7}	6

Quarterfinals
1	(United Kingdom) M Brooks (Slovenia) D Jakupović	6	4	[10]
(Finland) L Hietaranta (Serbia) A Stanković	3	6	[3]
4	(Spain) Á Fita Boluda (Switzerland) Y In-Albon
(Croatia) M Dražić (Hungary) A Nagy	w/o
(Poland) G Feistel (Poland) M Podlińska	6	3
3	(Ukraine) M Kolb (Ukraine) N Kolb	2	0^{r}
(Croatia) I Primorac Pavičić (Slovakia) R Zelníčková	6^{6}	2
2	(United Kingdom) F Christie (Bosnia and Herzegovina) A Wagner	7^{8}	6

Semifinals
1	(United Kingdom) M Brooks (Slovenia) D Jakupović	3	6	[10]
(Croatia) M Dražić (Hungary) A Nagy	6	3	[8]
(Poland) G Feistel (Poland) M Podlińska	7	6
2	(United Kingdom) F Christie (Bosnia and Herzegovina) A Wagner	5	4

Final
1	(United Kingdom) M Brooks (Slovenia) D Jakupović	6	6^{3}	[8]
(Poland) G Feistel (Poland) M Podlińska	2	7^{7}	[10]
