= 2024 Ladies Open Vienna – Singles =

Singles
- 2024 Ladies Open Vienna

Final
- Champion: (Croatia) Tena Lukas
- Runner-up: (Bulgaria) Lia Karatancheva
- Score: 6–4, 6–1

Events
Singles	Doubles
← 2023 ·	Ladies Open Vienna	· 2025 →

Tena Lukas successfully defended her title, defeating Lia Karatancheva in the final, 6–4, 6–1.

== Seeds ==
1. (Hungary) Panna Udvardy (withdrew)
2. (Spain) Leyre Romero Gormaz (quarterfinals)
3. (Croatia) Lucija Ćirić Bagarić (first round)
4. (Poland) Katarzyna Kawa (first round)
5. (Ukraine) Anastasiia Sobolieva (first round, retired)
6. (North Macedonia) Lina Gjorcheska (first round)
7. (Czech Republic) Barbora Palicová (second round)
8. (Slovenia) Dalila Jakupović (second round)
9. (Italy) Nuria Brancaccio (semifinals)

== Draw ==
=== Key ===
- Q = Qualifier
- WC = Wild card
- LL = Lucky loser
- Alt = Alternate
- SE = Special exempt
- PR = Protected ranking
- ITF = ITF entry
- JE = Junior exempt
- w/o = Walkover
- r = Retired
- d = Defaulted
- SR = Special ranking

=== Finals ===
Semifinals
9	(Italy) Nuria Brancaccio	3	6	4
(Croatia) Tena Lukas	6	3	6
Q	(Croatia) Iva Primorac	2	3
Q	(Bulgaria) Lia Karatancheva	6	6

Final
(Croatia) Tena Lukas	6	6
Q	(Bulgaria) Lia Karatancheva	4	1

=== Top half ===
First round
9	(Italy) N Brancaccio	3	6	6
SR	(Italy) M Paoletti	6	3	4
(Turkey) İ Öz	6	7^{7}
(Austria) S Kraus	4	6^{5}
LL	(Germany) S Dal	6	7^{7}
WC	(Austria) J Grabher	3	6^{4}
(Serbia) L Radivojević	5	6	6
6	(North Macedonia) L Gjorcheska	7	2	3
3	(Croatia) L Ćirić Bagarić	4	6	3
LL	(Italy) A Zucchini	6	4	6
Q	(Mexico) M Portillo Ramírez	6	6
Q	(Canada) V Mboko	4	3
(Croatia) T Lukas	6^{2}	7^{7}	6
(Poland) G Feistel	7^{7}	6^{3}	3
SR	(Germany) N Schunk	5	7^{7}	3
8	(Slovenia) D Jakupović	7	6^{5}	6

Second round
9	(Italy) N Brancaccio	6	7
(Turkey) İ Öz	3	5
LL	(Germany) S Dal	3	1
(Serbia) L Radivojević	6	6
LL	(Italy) A Zucchini	6	6^{3}	4
Q	(Mexico) M Portillo Ramírez	3	7^{7}	6
(Croatia) T Lukas	6	7^{7}
8	(Slovenia) D Jakupović	4	6^{3}

Quarterfinals
9	(Italy) N Brancaccio	7	6
(Serbia) L Radivojević	5	1
Q	(Mexico) M Portillo Ramírez	3	4
(Croatia) T Lukas	6	6

Semifinals
9	(Italy) N Brancaccio	3	6	4
(Croatia) T Lukas	6	3	6

=== Bottom half ===
First round
7	(Czech Republic) B Palicová	1	6	6
(United States) M Sieg	6	1	2
(Turkey) A Aksu	6	6
WC	(Austria) T Kostic	2	0
Q	(Hungary) A Nagy	6	1	4
Q	(Croatia) I Primorac	3	6	6
Q	(Italy) J Ruggeri	6^{2}	6	6
4	(Poland) K Kawa	7^{7}	3	1
5	(Ukraine) A Sobolieva	6	6^{5}	0^{r}
Q	(Bulgaria) L Karatancheva	4	7^{7}	0
WC	(Austria) A Koller	1	1
Q	V Kan	6	6
(Latvia) D Marcinkēviča	7	1	4
(Czech Republic) A Kučmová	5	6	6
Q	E Maklakova	4	3
2	(Spain) L Romero Gormaz	6	6

Second round
7	(Czech Republic) B Palicová	5	2
(Turkey) A Aksu	7	6
Q	(Croatia) I Primorac	6	3	6
Q	(Italy) J Ruggeri	3	6	3
Q	(Bulgaria) L Karatancheva	6	1
Q	V Kan	2	0^{r}
(Czech Republic) A Kučmová	2	2
2	(Spain) L Romero Gormaz	6	6

Quarterfinals
(Turkey) A Aksu	3	5
Q	(Croatia) I Primorac	6	7
Q	(Bulgaria) L Karatancheva	5	6	6
2	(Spain) L Romero Gormaz	7	3	2

Semifinals
Q	(Croatia) I Primorac	2	3
Q	(Bulgaria) L Karatancheva	6	6
