= 2025 Ladies Open Vienna – Singles =

Singles
- 2025 Ladies Open Vienna

Final
- Champion: (Austria) Sinja Kraus
- Runner-up: (Romania) Miriam Bulgaru
- Score: 3–6, 6–2, 6–3

Events
Singles	Doubles
← 2024 ·	Ladies Open Vienna	· 2026 →

Tena Lukas was the two time defending champion, but lost in the first round to Barbora Palicová.

Sinja Kraus won the title, after defeating Miriam Bulgaru 3–6, 6–2, 6–3 in the final.

== Seeds ==
1. (Spain) Leyre Romero Gormaz (second round)
2. (Austria) Sinja Kraus (champion)
3. (Germany) Jule Niemeier (first round)
4. (Czech Republic) Barbora Palicová (second round, retired)
5. (Romania) Miriam Bulgaru (final)
6. (Spain) Irene Burillo (quarterfinals)
7. (Italy) Giorgia Pedone (first round)
8. (Spain) Marina Bassols Ribera (second round)

== Draw ==
=== Key ===
- Q = Qualifier
- WC = Wild card
- LL = Lucky loser
- Alt = Alternate
- ITF = ITF entry
- PR = Protected ranking
- SR = Special ranking
- SE = Special exempt
- JE = Junior exempt
- JR = Junior Accelerator Programme entrant
- CO = College Accelerator Programme entrant
- NG = Next Gen Accelerator Program entrant
- w/o = Walkover
- r = Retired
- d = Defaulted

=== Finals ===
Semifinals
5	(Romania) Miriam Bulgaru	6	6
WC	(Austria) Anna Pircher	1	4
WC	(Austria) Lilli Tagger	4	1
2	(Austria) Sinja Kraus	6	6

Final
5	(Romania) Miriam Bulgaru	6	2	3
2	(Austria) Sinja Kraus	3	6	6

=== Top half ===
First round
1	(Spain) L Romero Gormaz	6	6
(Ukraine) A Sobolieva	2	4
Q	(Croatia) I Primorac Pavičić	6^{5}	6^{3}
Q	(Ukraine) K Zavatska	7^{7}	7^{7}
Q	(Italy) S De Stefano	6	2	1
Q	(Finland) L Hietaranta	2	6	6
(Croatia) L Bošković	5	3
5	(Romania) M Bulgaru	7	6
3	(Germany) J Niemeier	6	3	2
Q	(United States) E Schoppe	3	6	6
(Spain) Á Fita Boluda	4	4^{r}
WC	(Austria) A Pircher	6	2
Q	(Italy) A Mazzola	0^{r}
(Switzerland) Y In-Albon	3
(Turkey) İ Öz	5	7^{7}	4
8	(Spain) M Bassols Ribera	7	6^{5}	6

Second round
1	(Spain) L Romero Gormaz	4	4
Q	(Ukraine) K Zavatska	6	6
Q	(Finland) L Hietaranta	0	7^{7}	1
5	(Romania) M Bulgaru	6	6^{5}	6
Q	(United States) E Schoppe	6	4	1
WC	(Austria) A Pircher	3	6	6
(Switzerland) Y In-Albon	6	7^{7}
8	(Spain) M Bassols Ribera	3	6^{4}

Quarterfinals
Q	(Ukraine) K Zavatska	4	6	4
5	(Romania) M Bulgaru	6	4	6
WC	(Austria) A Pircher	6	6
(Switzerland) Y In-Albon	3	0

Semifinals
5	(Romania) M Bulgaru	6	6
WC	(Austria) A Pircher	1	4

=== Bottom half ===
First round
7	(Italy) G Pedone	6	4	4
Q	(Slovakia) R Zelníčková	2	6	6
WC	(Austria) C Gasparovic	1	6	2
(France) A Ramé	6	2	6
WC	(Austria) L Tagger	7^{7}	6
(Slovenia) D Jakupović	6^{5}	0
(Croatia) T Lukas	3	3
4	(Czech Republic) B Palicová	6	6
6	(Spain) I Burillo	6	6
LL	(Poland) M Podlińska	2	2
(Hungary) AK Tóth	6	6
WC	(Austria) E Perelygina	2	3
(Switzerland) L Küng	6	2
(Ukraine) V Strakhova	1	0^{r}
Q	(Serbia) A Stanković	6^{4}	4
2	(Austria) S Kraus	7^{7}	6

Second round
Q	(Slovakia) R Zelníčková	1	0
(France) A Ramé	6	6
WC	(Austria) L Tagger	5
4	(Czech Republic) B Palicová	0^{r}
6	(Spain) I Burillo	6	6
(Hungary) AK Tóth	2	3
(Switzerland) L Küng	3	4
2	(Austria) S Kraus	6	6

Quarterfinals
(France) A Ramé	4	2
WC	(Austria) L Tagger	6	6
6	(Spain) I Burillo	2	3
2	(Austria) S Kraus	6	6

Semifinals
WC	(Austria) L Tagger	4	1
2	(Austria) S Kraus	6	6
