= 2024 Ladies Open Vienna – Doubles =

Doubles
- 2024 Ladies Open Vienna

Final
- Champions: (United Kingdom) Emily Appleton (France) Estelle Cascino
- Runners-up: (Ukraine) Maryna Kolb (Ukraine) Nadiia Kolb
- Score: 6–4, 7–6^{(7–1)}

Events
| Singles | Doubles |
| ← 2023 · | Ladies Open Vienna | · 2025 → |

Irina Bara and Weronika Falkowska were the defending champions but chose not to participate.

Emily Appleton and Estelle Cascino won the title, defeating Maryna and Nadiia Kolb in the final, 6–4, 7–6^{(7–1)}.

== Seeds ==
1. (Slovenia) Dalila Jakupović / (Poland) Katarzyna Kawa (quarterfinals)
2. (United Kingdom) Emily Appleton / (France) Estelle Cascino (champions)
3. (United Kingdom) Alicia Barnett / (Netherlands) Isabelle Haverlag (quarterfinals)
4. (Ukraine) Maryna Kolb / (Ukraine) Nadiia Kolb (final)

== Draw ==
=== Key ===
- Q = Qualifier
- WC = Wild card
- LL = Lucky loser
- Alt = Alternate
- SE = Special exempt
- PR = Protected ranking
- ITF = ITF entry
- JE = Junior exempt
- w/o = Walkover
- r = Retired
- d = Defaulted
- SR = Special ranking

First round
WC | (Austria) V Freigassner (Austria) AM Glaser | 1 | 2
(Czech Republic) D Hindová (Czech Republic) K Kubáňová | 6 | 6
4 | (Ukraine) M Kolb (Ukraine) N Kolb | 6 | 6
(Serbia) M Mašić (Serbia) N Paleček | 0 | 0
(Bulgaria) L Karatancheva (Latvia) D Marcinkēviča | w/o
(Ukraine) A Sobolieva (Ukraine) A Zaparyniuk
(Austria) K Fronek (Austria) A Pircher
(Italy) N Brancaccio (Spain) L Romero Gormaz | w/o
(Japan) F Kozaki; E Maklakova | 4 | 2
3 | (United Kingdom) A Barnett (Netherlands) I Haverlag | 6 | 6
(Slovakia) S Drugdová (Hungary) A Nagy | 3 | 6^{2}
(Austria) M Klaffner (Austria) E Perelygina | 6 | 7^{7}
(Slovakia) V Chramcová; A Mozgaleva | 1 | 2
2 | (United Kingdom) E Appleton (France) E Cascino | 6 | 6

Quarterfinals
1 | (Slovenia) D Jakupović (Poland) K Kawa | 7 | 3 | [6]
(Czech Republic) D Hindová (Czech Republic) K Kubáňová | 5 | 6 | [10]
4 | (Ukraine) M Kolb (Ukraine) N Kolb | 6 | 6
(Bulgaria) L Karatancheva (Latvia) D Marcinkēviča | 2 | 1
(Italy) N Brancaccio (Spain) L Romero Gormaz | 6 | 6
3 | (United Kingdom) A Barnett (Netherlands) I Haverlag | 4 | 3
(Austria) M Klaffner (Austria) E Perelygina | 5 | 4
2 | (United Kingdom) E Appleton (France) E Cascino | 7 | 6

Semifinals
(Czech Republic) D Hindová (Czech Republic) K Kubáňová | 4 | 4
4 | (Ukraine) M Kolb (Ukraine) N Kolb | 6 | 6
(Italy) N Brancaccio (Spain) L Romero Gormaz | 1 | 4
2 | (United Kingdom) E Appleton (France) E Cascino | 6 | 6

Final
4 | (Ukraine) M Kolb (Ukraine) N Kolb | 4 | 6^{1}
2 | (United Kingdom) E Appleton (France) E Cascino | 6 | 7^{7}
