= Gina Feistel =

Polish tennis player (born 2003)

- Country (sports): Poland (2022–present); Germany (2021–2022)
- Born: 25 January 2003 (age 23) Mörfelden-Walldorf, Germany
- Height: 1.75 m (5 ft 9 in)
- Turned pro: 2021
- College: Belmont
- Coach: Magdalena Feistel
- Prize money: US $96,514

Singles
- Career record: 152–98
- Highest ranking: No. 275 (9 November 2026)
- Current ranking: No. 279 (16 November 2026)

Doubles
- Career record: 54–46
- Highest ranking: No. 417 (31 August 2026)
- Current ranking: No. 438 (9 November 2026)
- Last updated on: 15 November 2026.

Gina Feistel (born 25 January 2003) is a German-born Polish professional tennis player. She has career-high rankings of No. 275 in singles, achieved on 9 November 2026, and No. 417 in doubles, achieved on 9 November 2026.

== Early life ==
Feistel was born in Mörfelden-Walldorf, Germany, to Andreas and Magdalena (née Mróz) Feistel. Her mother is a former tennis player who represented Poland at the 1992 Summer Olympics. Feistel herself began representing Poland in 2022.

== Career ==
In October 2023, she won her first professional title at the W15 event in Monastir, defeating Oana Gavrilă in the final. In April 2024, she won her second title at the W15 Gran Canaria Women's TDC Series Pro in Telde, defeating Emily Seibold in the final.

In September 2025, she won her first W75 title at the Ladies Open Vienna in the doubles draw, partnering Marcelina Podlińska.

== WTA 125 finals ==
=== Doubles: 1 (1 runner-up) ===
Result	W–L	Date	Tournament	Surface	Partner	Opponents	Score
Loss	0–1	Oct 2026	Lisboa Belém Open, Portugal	Clay	(Cyprus) Raluca Șerban	(Slovenia) Dalila Jakupović (Slovenia) Nika Radišić	3–6, 1–6

== ITF Circuit finals ==
=== Singles: 9 (5 titles, 4 runner-ups) ===
Legend W75 tournaments (0–1) W50 tournaments (0–1) W35 tournaments (1–0) W15 tournaments (4–2)	Finals by surface Hard (2–1) Clay (3–3)

Result	W–L	Date	Tournament	Tier	Surface	Opponent	Score
Loss	0–1	Jun 2023	ITF Gdańsk, Poland	W15	Clay	(Germany) Carolina Kuhl	6–2, 2–6, 6–7^{(5)}
Loss	0–2	Sep 2023	ITF Monastir, Tunisia	W15	Hard	(France) Diana Martynov	4–6, 2–6
Win	1–2	Oct 2023	ITF Monastir, Tunisia	W15	Hard	(Romania) Oana Gavrilă	6–1, 6–4
Win	2–2	Apr 2024	ITF Telde, Spain	W15	Clay	(Germany) Emily Seibold	6–3, 2–6, 7–6^{(4)}
Win	3–2	Jun 2024	ITF Klosters, Switzerland	W35	Clay	(Switzerland) Jenny Dürst	6–7^{(9)}, 6–2, 6–1
Loss	3–3	Jul 2024	ITF The Hague, Netherlands	W75	Clay	(Netherlands) Arantxa Rus	1–6, 6–4, 2–6
Win	4–3	Sep 2025	ITF Radom, Poland	W15	Clay	(Denmark) Rebecca Munk Mortensen	6–3, 4–6, 7–6^{(5)}
Win	5–3	Mar 2026	ITF Huamantla, Mexico	W15	Hard	(Italy) Miriana Tona	7–5, 6–1
Loss	5–4	Jun 2026	ITF Gdańsk, Poland	W50	Clay	(Ukraine) Anastasiia Sobolieva	4–6, 2–6

=== Doubles: 8 (4 titles, 4 runner-ups) ===
Legend W75 tournaments (1–0) W25/35 tournaments (1–1) W15 tournaments (2–3)	Finals by surface Hard (2–2) Clay (2–2)

Result	W–L	Date	Tournament	Tier	Surface	Partner	Opponents	Score
Loss	0–1	Oct 2022	ITF Monastir, Tunisia	W15	Hard	(Tunisia) Feryel Ben Hassen	(Serbia) Elena Milovanović (China) Wei Sijia	4–6, 1–6
Loss	0–2	Jun 2023	ITF Gdańsk, Poland	W15	Clay	(Poland) Marcelina Podlińska	(Ukraine) Maryna Kolb (Ukraine) Nadiia Kolb	0–6, 1–6
Win	1–2	Sep 2023	ITF Monastir, Tunisia	W15	Hard	(Germany) Laura Böhner	(Brazil) Georgia Gulin (Italy) Camilla Zanolini	7–5, 6–0
Loss	1–3	Dec 2023	ITF Sharm El-Sheikh, Egypt	W25	Hard	(Poland) Maja Chwalińska	Victoria Mikhaylova; Mariia Tkacheva	4–6, 6–3, [11–13]
Win	2–3	Mar 2024	ITF Monastir, Tunisia	W15	Hard	(Germany) Selina Dal	(France) Yasmine Mansouri (Serbia) Elena Milovanović	3–6, 6–4, [10–1]
Loss	2–4	Aug 2025	ITF Kraków, Poland	W15	Clay	(Poland) Marcelina Podlińska	(Hungary) Adrienn Nagy (Czech Republic) Linda Ševčíková	3–6, 0–6
Win	3–4	Sep 2025	Ladies Open Vienna, Austria	W75	Clay	(Poland) Marcelina Podlińska	(United Kingdom) Madeleine Brooks (Slovenia) Dalila Jakupović	2–6, 7–6^{(3)}, [10–8]
Win	4–4	Mar 2026	ITF Junin, Argentina	W35	Clay	(Argentina) Martina Capurro Taborda	(Argentina) Luisina Giovannini (Mexico) Marian Gómez Pezuela Cano	7–5, 6–3
