= Marcelina Podlińska =

Polish tennis player

- Country (sports): Poland
- Born: 27 May 1999 (age 27) Olsztyn, Poland
- Plays: Right-handed
- Prize money: $47,802

Singles
- Career record: 154–140
- Career titles: 2 ITF
- Highest ranking: No. 579 (13 October 2025)
- Current ranking: No. 889 (26 October 2026)

Doubles
- Career record: 66–82
- Career titles: 3 ITF
- Highest ranking: No. 415 (31 August 2026)
- Current ranking: No. 702 (26 October 2026)
- Last updated on: 30 October 2026.

Marcelina Podlińska (born 27 May 1999) is a Polish tennis player.

Podlińska has a career-high singles ranking by the WTA of 579, reached on 13 October 2025, and a best doubles ranking of world No. 415, achieved on 31 August 2026.

Podlińska played for the Oklahoma Sooners between 2019 and 2022 in the NCAA Tennis Championships.

== Career ==
Podlińska won her first W75 title at the 2025 Ladies Open Vienna in the doubles draw, partnering with Gina Feistel.

== ITF Circuit finals ==
=== Singles: 3 (2 titles, 1 runner-up) ===
Legend W15 tournaments (2–1)	Finals by surface Clay (2–1)

Result	W–L	Date	Tournament	Tier	Surface	Opponent	Score
Loss	0–1	May 2025	ITF Vall de Uxó, Spain	W15	Clay	(Spain) Ruth Roura Llaverias	2–6, 3–6
Win	1–1	July 2025	ITF Savitaipale, Finland	W15	Clay	(Poland) Anna Hertel	6–3, 6–4
Win	2–1	August 2025	ITF Bielsko-Biała, Poland	W15	Clay	(Czech Republic) Lucie Urbanová	6–1, 6–3

=== Doubles: 8 (3 titles, 5 runner-ups) ===
Legend W75 tournaments (1–0) W15 tournaments (2–5)	Finals by surface Hard (0–1) Clay (3–4)

Result	W–L	Date	Location	Tier	Surface	Partner	Opponents	Score
Loss	0–1	Apr 2019	ITF Sharm El Sheikh, Egypt	W15	Hard	(Poland) Stefania Rogozińska Dzik	(United States) Nadja Gilchrist (Canada) Louise Kwong	1–6, 1–6
Loss	0–2	Jun 2023	ITF Gdańsk, Poland	W15	Clay	(Poland) Gina Feistel	(Ukraine) Maryna Kolb (Ukraine) Nadiya Kolb	0–6, 1–6
Loss	0–3	Apr 2024	ITF Telde, Spain	W15	Clay	(Germany) Caroline Werner	(Sweden) Ida Johansson (Sweden) Jacquline Nylander Altelius	3–6, 2–6
Win	1–3	Apr 2024	ITF Varberg, Sweden	W15	Clay	(Germany) Sina Herrmann	(Sweden) Ida Johansson (Sweden) Jacquline Nylander Altelius	6–4, 6–1
Loss	1–4	Aug 2025	ITF Kraków, Poland	W15	Clay	(Poland) Gina Feistel	(Hungary) Adrienn Nagy (Czech Republic) Linda Ševčíková	3–6, 0–6
Win	2–4	Sep 2025	Ladies Open Vienna, Austria	W75	Clay	(Poland) Gina Feistel	(United Kingdom) Madeleine Brooks (Slovenia) Dalila Jakupović	2–6, 7–6^{(3)}, [10–8]
Loss	2–5	Apr 2026	ITF Oegstgeest, Netherlands	W15	Clay	(Sweden) Ida Johansson	(Belgium) Kaat Coppez (Mexico) Fernanda Navarro	4–6, 7–6^{(1)}, [10–12]
Win	3–5	Jul 2026	ITF Bielsko-Biała, Poland	W15	Clay	(Poland) Oriana Gniewkowska	(Poland) Daria Gorska (Slovakia) Emma Slavíková	7–5, 6–2
