= 2025 Ladies Open Vienna =

Tennis tournament

- Date: 1–7 September 2025
- Edition: 19th
- Category: ITF Women's World Tennis Tour
- Prize money: $60,000
- Surface: Clay / Outdoor
- Location: Vienna, Austria; 48.155897°N 16.318271°E

Champions

Singles
- (Austria) Sinja Kraus

Doubles
- (Poland) Gina Feistel / (Poland) Marcelina Podlińska
- Ladies Open Vienna

The 2025 Ladies Open Vienna is a professional tennis tournament playing on outdoor clay courts. It is the nineteenth edition of the tournament, which is part of the 2025 ITF Women's World Tennis Tour. It take place in Vienna, Austria, between 1 and 7 September 2025.

== Champions ==
=== Singles ===
- (Austria) Sinja Kraus def. (Romania) Miriam Bulgaru, 3–6, 6–2, 6–3

=== Doubles ===
- (Poland) Gina Feistel / (Poland) Marcelina Podlińska def. (United Kingdom) Madeleine Brooks / (Slovenia) Dalila Jakupović, 2–6, 7–6^{(7–3)}, [10–8]

== Singles main draw entrants ==
=== Seeds ===
Country	Player	Rank	Seed
ESP	Leyre Romero Gormaz	123	1
AUT	Sinja Kraus	129	2
GER	Jule Niemeier	184	3
CZE	Barbora Palicová	197	4
ROU	Miriam Bulgaru	200	5
ESP	Irene Burillo	247	6
ITA	Giorgia Pedone	249	7
ESP	Marina Bassols Ribera	260	8

- Rankings are as of 25 August 2025.

=== Other entrants ===
The following players received wildcards into the singles main draw:

- (Austria) Claudia Gasparovic
- (Austria) Ekaterina Perelygina
- (Austria) Anna Pircher
- (Austria) Lilli Tagger

The following players received entry from the qualifying draw:

- (Italy) Samira De Stefano
- (Finland) Laura Hietaranta
- (Italy) Alessandra Mazzola
- (Croatia) Iva Primorac Pavičić
- (United States) Ellie Schoppe
- (Serbia) Anja Stanković
- (Ukraine) Katarina Zavatska
- (Slovakia) Radka Zelníčková

The following player received entry as a lucky loser:

- (Poland) Marcelina Podlińska
