= 2014 Fed Cup Europe/Africa Zone Group I – Pool C =

Group C of the 2014 Fed Cup Europe/Africa Zone Group I was one of four pools in the Europe/Africa zone of the 2014 Fed Cup. Four teams competed in a round robin competition, with the top team and the bottom team proceeding to their respective sections of the play-offs: the top team played for advancement to the World Group II Play-offs, while the bottom team faced potential relegation to Group II.

== Standings ==
		(Ukraine) UKR	(Austria) AUT	(Slovenia) SLO	(Israel) ISR	RR; W–L	Match; W–L	Set; W–L	Game; W–L	Standings
21	Ukraine		2–1	3–0	3–0	3–0	8–1	16–4	113–67	1
26	Austria	1–2		3–0	1–2	1–2	5–4	11–9	97-89	3
32	Slovenia	0–3	0–3		1–2	0–3	1–8	4–17	75–120	4
36	Israel	0–3	2–1	2–1		2–1	4–5	10–11	92-101	2

== Round-robin ==
=== Ukraine vs. Israel ===
Ukraine
3
Syma Sport and Events Centre, Budapest, Hungary
5 February 2014
Hard (indoors)

Israel
0

			1	2	3
1	(Ukraine) (Israel)	Nadiia Kichenok; Julia Glushko	6; 2	7^{7} 6^{4}
2	(Ukraine) (Israel)	Elina Svitolina; Shahar Pe'er	6; 1	6; 4
3	(Ukraine) (Israel)	Lyudmyla Kichenok / Olga Savchuk; Julia Glushko / Shahar Pe'er	6; 3	6; 1

=== Austria vs. Slovenia ===
Austria
3
Syma Sport and Events Centre, Budapest, Hungary
5 February 2014
Hard (indoors)

Slovenia
0

			1	2	3
1	(Austria) (Slovenia)	Patricia Mayr-Achleitner; Maša Zec Peškirič	6; 2	6; 3
2	(Austria) (Slovenia)	Yvonne Meusburger; Nastja Kolar	6; 2	6; 3
3	(Austria) (Slovenia)	Sandra Klemenschits / Tamira Paszek; Andreja Klepač / Nastja Kolar	7; 5	7; 5

=== Ukraine vs. Slovenia ===
Ukraine
3
Syma Sport and Events Centre, Budapest, Hungary
6 February 2014
Hard (indoors)

Slovenia
0

			1	2	3
1	(Ukraine) (Slovenia)	Lyudmyla Kichenok; Dalila Jakupović	4; 6	6; 4	6; 1
2	(Ukraine) (Slovenia)	Elina Svitolina; Nastja Kolar	6; 3	6^{3} 7^{7}	6; 3
3	(Ukraine) (Slovenia)	Lyudmyla Kichenok / Olga Savchuk; Dalila Jakupović / Andreja Klepač	6; 2	6; 3

=== Austria vs. Israel ===
Austria
1
Syma Sport and Events Centre, Budapest, Hungary
6 February 2014
Hard (indoors)

Israel
2

			1	2	3
1	(Austria) (Israel)	Patricia Mayr-Achleitner; Julia Glushko	6; 1	4; 6	6; 2
2	(Austria) (Israel)	Yvonne Meusburger; Shahar Pe'er	5; 7	3; 6
3	(Austria) (Israel)	Patricia Mayr-Achleitner / Tamira Paszek; Julia Glushko / Shahar Pe'er	4; 6	7; 5	3; 6

=== Ukraine vs. Austria ===
Ukraine
2
Syma Sport and Events Centre, Budapest, Hungary
8 February 2014
Hard (indoors)

Austria
1

			1	2	3
1	(Ukraine) (Austria)	Nadiia Kichenok; Patricia Mayr-Achleitner	2; 6	4; 6
2	(Ukraine) (Austria)	Elina Svitolina; Yvonne Meusburger	6; 1	6; 2
3	(Ukraine) (Austria)	Lyudmyla Kichenok / Olga Savchuk; Sandra Klemenschits / Patricia Mayr-Achleitner	6; 4	6; 2

=== Slovenia vs. Israel ===
Slovenia
1
Syma Sport and Events Centre, Budapest, Hungary
8 February 2014
Hard (indoors)

Israel
2

			1	2	3
1	(Slovenia) (Israel)	Dalila Jakupović; Julia Glushko	6; 3	2; 6	6; 2
2	(Slovenia) (Israel)	Maša Zec Peškirič; Shahar Pe'er	1; 6	2; 6
3	(Slovenia) (Israel)	Andreja Klepač / Dalila Jakupović; Julia Glushko / Shahar Pe'er	4; 6	5; 7

== See also ==
- Fed Cup structure
