= Ladies Open Vienna =

- 2025 Ladies Open Vienna

ITF Women's Tour
- Event name: Ladies Open Vienna
- Location: Vienna, Austria
- Venue: UTC La Ville
- Category: ITF Women's World Tennis Tour
- Surface: Hard / Outdoor
- Draw: 32S/32Q/16D
- Prize money: $60,000

The Ladies Open Vienna is a tournament for professional female tennis players played on outdoor clay courts. The event is classified as a $60,000 ITF Women's World Tennis Tour tournament and has been held in Vienna, Austria, since 2006.

== Past finals ==
=== Singles ===
| Year | Champion | Runner-up | Score |
|---|---|---|---|
| 2025 | (Austria) Sinja Kraus | (Romania) Miriam Bulgaru | 3–6, 6–2, 6–3 |
| 2024 | (Croatia) Tena Lukas | (Bulgaria) Lia Karatancheva | 6–4, 6–1 |
| 2023 | (Croatia) Tena Lukas | (Romania) Miriam Bulgaru | 7–5, 6–1 |
| 2022 | (Hungary) Natália Szabanin | (Croatia) Tena Lukas | 7–5, 6–3 |
| 2021 | (Romania) Cristina Dinu | (Austria) Sinja Kraus | 6–3, 6–4 |
| 2020 | Tournament cancelled due to the COVID-19 pandemic | | |
| 2019 | (Croatia) Tena Lukas | (Romania) Miriam Bulgaru | 5–7, 6–4, 6–3 |
| 2018 | (Poland) Marta Leśniak | (United Kingdom) Francesca Jones | 6–0, 6–3 |
| 2017 | (France) Clothilde de Bernardi | (Czech Republic) Gabriela Pantůčková | 6–1, 6–2 |
| 2016 | (Austria) Mira Antonitsch | (Czech Republic) Petra Krejsová | 3–6, 7–6^{(7–2)}, 7–6^{(7–2)} |
| 2015 | (Austria) Julia Grabher | (Germany) Katharina Gerlach | 6–3, 3–6, 6–1 |
| 2014 | (Spain) Laura Pous Tió | (Czech Republic) Gabriela Pantůčková | 6–7^{(6–8)}, 6–3, 6–1 |
| 2013 | (Slovakia) Petra Uberalová | (Czech Republic) Kateřina Kramperová | 4–6, 6–2, 6–2 |
| 2012 | (Austria) Barbara Haas | (France) Amandine Hesse | 6–1, 6–4 |
| 2011 | (Belarus) Ilona Kremen | (Czech Republic) Kateřina Vaňková | 6–1, 6–1 |
| 2010 | (Czech Republic) Lucie Kriegsmannová | (Czech Republic) Zuzana Zálabská | 6–3, 6–1 |
| 2009 | (Czech Republic) Lucie Kriegsmannová | (Serbia) Nataša Zorić | 6–4, 6–7^{(7–9)}, 7–5 |
| 2008 | (Austria) Nikola Hofmanova | (Slovakia) Nikola Vajdová | 6–3, 6–1 |
| 2007 | (Croatia) Darija Jurak | (Brazil) Teliana Pereira | 6–1, 1–6, 6–2 |
| 2006 | (Bosnia and Herzegovina) Sandra Martinović | (Slovakia) Lenka Wienerová | 6–4, 6–3 |

=== Doubles ===
| Year | Champions | Runners-up | Score |
|---|---|---|---|
| 2025 | (Poland) Gina Feistel (Poland) Marcelina Podlińska | (United Kingdom) Madeleine Brooks (Slovenia) Dalila Jakupović | 2–6, 7–6^{(7–3)}, [10–8] |
| 2024 | (United Kingdom) Emily Appleton (France) Estelle Cascino | (Ukraine) Maryna Kolb (Ukraine) Nadiia Kolb | 6–4, 7–6^{(7–1)} |
| 2023 | (Romania) Irina Bara (Poland) Weronika Falkowska | (Austria) Melanie Klaffner (Austria) Sinja Kraus | 6–3, 2–6, [13–11] |
| 2022 | (Germany) Lena Papadakis (Czech Republic) Anna Sisková | (Slovenia) Živa Falkner (Hungary) Amarissa Kiara Tóth | 7–6^{(10–8)}, 6–4 |
| 2021 | (Brazil) Carolina Alves (Poland) Martyna Kubka | (Russia) Erika Andreeva (Russia) Ekaterina Kazionova | 6–7^{(1–7)}, 6–4, [10–7] |
| 2020 | Tournament cancelled due to the COVID-19 pandemic | | |
| 2019 | (Germany) Vivian Heisen (Germany) Katharina Hobgarski | (Spain) Irene Burillo Escorihuela (Spain) Andrea Lázaro García | 7–6^{(7–4)}, 6–4 |
| 2018 | (Slovakia) Jana Jablonovská (Slovakia) Lenka Juríková | (Czech Republic) Sabina Machalová (Czech Republic) Veronika Vlkovská | 1–6, 6–3, [10–4] |
| 2017 | (Italy) Anastasia Grymalska (Italy) Dalila Spiteri | (Mexico) Ana Sofía Sánchez (Italy) Lucrezia Stefanini | 0–6, 6–3, [10–8] |
| 2016 | (Germany) Vivian Heisen (Austria) Janina Toljan | (Czech Republic) Petra Krejsová (Czech Republic) Anna Slováková | 6–3, 6–2 |
| 2015 | (Australia) Sally Peers (France) Laëtitia Sarrazin | (Hungary) Ágnes Bukta (Austria) Janina Toljan | 6–1, 6–2 |
| 2014 | (Italy) Alice Balducci (Italy) Alice Savoretti | (Czech Republic) Kristýna Hrabalová (Czech Republic) Tereza Janatová | 7–5, 6–0 |
| 2013 | (Slovakia) Michaela Pochabová (Slovakia) Rebecca Šramková | (Japan) Hiroko Kuwata (Japan) Hirono Watanabe | 7–5, 6–2 |
| 2012 | (Russia) Natela Dzalamidze (Ukraine) Anna Shkudun | (Ukraine) Sofiya Kovalets (Germany) Christina Shakovets | 6–4, 7–5 |
| 2011 | (Czech Republic) Simona Dobrá (Czech Republic) Lucie Kriegsmannová | (Bosnia and Herzegovina) Sandra Martinović (Austria) Janina Toljan | 6–4, 6–1 |
| 2010 | (Czech Republic) Iveta Gerlová (Czech Republic) Lucie Kriegsmannová | (Czech Republic) Pavla Šmídová (Czech Republic) Zuzana Zálabská | 7–5, 6–3 |
| 2009 | (Czech Republic) Jana Jandová (Slovakia) Monika Kochanová | (United Kingdom) Amanda Carreras (Austria) Raphaela Zotter | 7–5, 5–7, [16–14] |
| 2008 | (Slovakia) Ľudmila Cervanová (Slovakia) Katarína Maráčková | (Romania) Laura Ioana Andrei (Austria) Nikola Hofmanova | 0–6, 6–3, [13–11] |
| 2007 | (Austria) Nikola Hofmanova (Brazil) Teliana Pereira | (Slovakia) Katarína Poljaková (Slovakia) Zuzana Zlochová | 7–6^{(7–1)}, 6–3 |
| 2006 | (Slovakia) Martina Babáková (Bosnia and Herzegovina) Sandra Martinović | (Austria) Franziska Klotz (Austria) Marlena Metzinger | 6–2, 6–0 |
