= Sinja Kraus =

Austrian tennis player (born 2002)

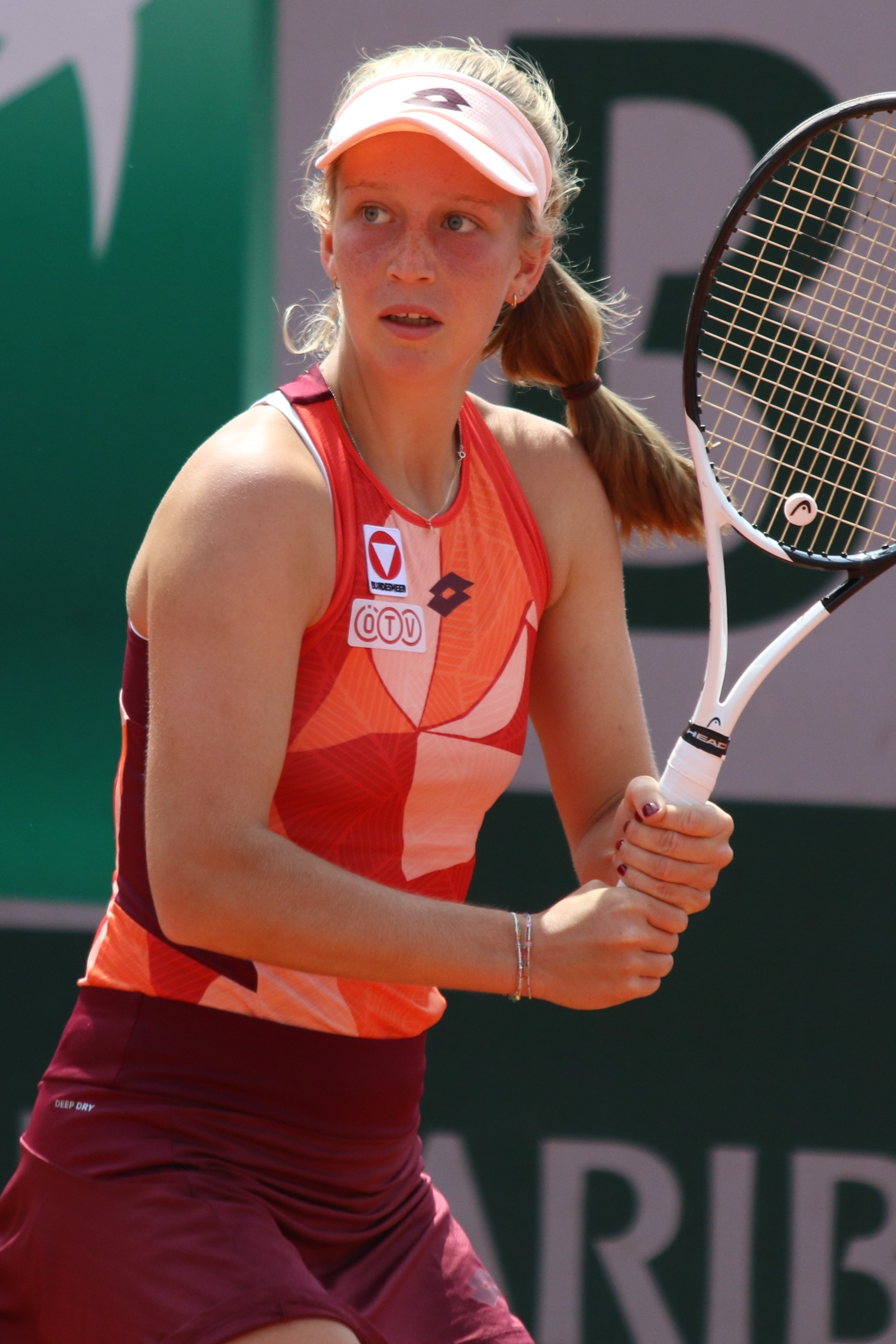
- Kraus at the 2023 French Open
- Country (sports): Austria
- Born: 29 April 2002 (age 24) Vienna
- Height: 175 cm (5 ft 9 in)
- Turned pro: 2018
- Plays: Right-handed
- Prize money: $1,276,689

Singles
- Career record: 298–196
- Career titles: 2 WTA 125
- Highest ranking: No. 75 (12 October 2026)
- Current ranking: No. 76 (19 October 2026)

Grand Slam singles results
- Australian Open: Q2 (2025)
- French Open: 1R (2026)
- Wimbledon: 1R (2026)
- US Open: 1R (2026)

Doubles
- Career record: 68–73
- Career titles: 2 ITF
- Highest ranking: No. 207 (13 April 2026)
- Current ranking: No. 245 (19 October 2026)

Team competitions
- Fed Cup: 16–14
Medal record
Women's tennis
Representing Austria
European Youth Olympic Festival
Bronze medal – third place	2017 Győr	Singles
- Last updated on: 19 October 2026.

Sinja Kraus (born 29 April 2002) is an Austrian tennis player. She has career-high WTA rankings of No. 75 in singles, achieved on 12 October 2026, and No. 207 in doubles, reached in April 2026.

Kraus has won two WTA 125 singles titles.

== Career ==
=== 2017–2019: Juniors ===
Kraus also won a bronze medal at the 2017 European Youth Summer Olympic Festival in Győr.

She had reached a career-high ITF juniors ranking of world No. 87, on 21 January 2019.

=== 2021–2025: WTA Tour debut, first WTA 125 title ===
Kraus made her WTA Tour main-draw debut as a wildcard entrant at the 2021 Upper Austria Ladies Linz, losing to Alison Van Uytvanck in the first round.

As a qualifier, she defeated eighth seed Nadia Podoroska to reach the second round at the WTA 125 2023 Bogota Open, where she lost to Nuria Brancaccio.

Kraus qualified for the main-draw at her home tournament, the WTA 500 2025 Linz Open. She lost in the first round to Anna Blinkova.

Kraus won her first WTA 125 title at the 2025 Cali Open, defeating Panna Udvardy in the final. She won her second WTA 125 title at the 2026 Generali Open Ladies Kitzbühel against fellow Austrian Tennis Player Julia Grabher.

=== 2026: Top 80, WTA 1000 and major debuts ===
Kraus defeated compatriot Julia Grabher in the first all-Austrian WTA Tour match since 2014, at the Auckland Open. She lost in the second round to Francesca Jones, in three sets. Kraus reached the top 100 in the WTA singles rankings on 23 February 2026 at world No. 99.

She qualified to make her WTA 1000 main draw at the Miami Open, but lost to Alycia Parks in straight sets.

Kraus qualified for her first major main draw at the French Open. She lost to 11th seed Belinda Bencic in the first round.

In July, Kraus won her second WTA 125 singles title at the Kitzbühel Ladies Open, defeating fellow Austrian player Julia Grabher in the final. As a result, she moved into the world's top 80, on 20 July 2026.

== National representation ==
Kraus represents Austria in the Billie Jean King Cup and made her debut in 2020, when she partnered Melanie Klaffner in the (then Fed Cup) tie against Italy, losing to Giulia Gatto-Monticone and Martina Trevisan.

== Performance timeline ==
Key
W	F	SF	QF	#R	RR	Q#	DNQ	A	NH

(W) winner; (F) finalist; (SF) semifinalist; (QF) quarterfinalist; (#R) rounds 4, 3, 2, 1; (RR) round-robin stage; (Q#) qualification round; (DNQ) did not qualify; (A) absent; (NH) not held; (SR) strike rate (events won / competed); (W–L) win–loss record.
To avoid confusion and double counting, these charts are updated at the conclusion of a tournament or when the player's participation has ended.

Only main-draw results in WTA Tour, Grand Slam tournaments, Billie Jean King Cup, United Cup, Hopman Cup and Olympic Games are included in win–loss records.

=== Singles ===
Tournament	2022	2023	2024	2025	2026	W–L
Grand Slam tournaments
Australian Open	A	Q1	Q1	Q2	Q1	0–0
French Open	A	Q1	Q2	Q1	1R	0–1
Wimbledon	A	Q3	A	Q1	1R	0–1
US Open	Q1	Q2	A	Q1	1R	0–1
Win–Loss	0–0	0–0	0–0	0–0	0–2	0–3
WTA 1000 tournaments
Indian Wells Open	A	A	A	A	Q1	0–0
Miami Open	A	A	A	A	1R	0–1
Madrid Open	A	A	A	A	1R	0–1
Italian Open	A	A	A	A	1R	0–1
Cincinnati Open	A	A	A	A	1R	0–1
China Open	NH	A	A	A	4R	3–1
Wuhan Open	Not Held		A	A	Q2	0–0
Win–Loss	0–0	0–0	0–0	0–0	3–5	3–5

== WTA 125 finals ==
=== Singles: 3 (2 titles, 1 runner-up) ===
Result	W–L	Date	Tournament	Surface	Opponent	Score
Win	1–0	Nov 2025	Cali Open, Colombia	Clay	(Hungary) Panna Udvardy	6–2, 6–0
Loss	1–1	Apr 2026	Oeiras Ladies Open, Portugal	Clay	(Poland) Maja Chwalińska	1–6, 3–6
Win	2–1	Jul 2026	Open Ladies Kitzbühel, Austria	Clay	(Austria) Julia Grabher	6–3, 6–1

== ITF Circuit finals ==
=== Singles: 21 (13 titles, 8 runner-ups) ===
Legend W60/75 tournaments W40/50 tournaments W25/35 tournaments W15 tournaments	Finals by surface Hard (2–2) Clay (11–6)

Result	W–L	Date	Tournament	Tier	Surface	Opponent	Score
Win	1–0	Sep 2018	ITF Antalya, Turkey	W15	Hard	(Turkey) Cemre Anıl	3–6, 6–4, 7–6^{(6)}
Loss	1–1	Aug 2019	ITF Wanfercee-Baulet, Belgium	W15	Clay	(Romania) Andreea Mitu	4–6, 3–6
Win	2–1	Jan 2021	ITF Cairo, Egypt	W15	Clay	(Russia) Elina Avanesyan	6–2, 6–3
Loss	2–2	Mar 2021	ITF Monastir, Tunisia	W15	Hard	(Poland) Weronika Falkowska	3–6, 6–7^{(1)}
Loss	2–3	Sep 2021	ITF Vienna, Austria	W25	Clay	(Romania) Cristina Dinu	3–6, 4–6
Loss	2–4	Jan 2022	ITF Cairo, Egypt	W25	Clay	(France) Séléna Janicijevic	5–7, 6–3, 3–6
Win	3–4	May 2022	ITF Warmbad Villach, Austria	W25	Clay	(Poland) Weronika Falkowska	7–5, 3–6, 6–4
Win	4-4	Jun 2022	ITF Pörtschach, Austria	W25	Clay	(Serbia) Ivana Jorović	6–1, 1–6, 6–2
Loss	4–5	Jul 2022	ITF Stuttgart-Vaihingen, Germany	W25	Clay	(Germany) Katharina Hobgarski	5–7, 2–6
Loss	4–6	Sep 2022	Collonge-Bellerive Open, Switzerland	W60	Clay	(Italy) Lucrezia Stefanini	2–6, 1–2 ret.
Loss	4–7	Mar 2023	ITF Anapoima, Colombia	W40	Clay	(Netherlands) Arantxa Rus	3–6, 7–6^{(3)}, 2–6
Win	5–7	Mar 2023	ITF Mosquera, Colombia	W25	Clay	(Colombia) Emiliana Arango	6–7^{(4)}, 7–6^{(6)}, 6–3
Win	6–7	Oct 2023	ITF Heraklion, Greece	W40	Clay	(France) Diane Parry	6–2, 4–6, 6–4
Win	7–7	Aug 2024	ITF Braunschweig, Germany	W35	Clay	Marina Melnikova	6–3, 3–6, 6–1
Win	8–7	Aug 2024	ITF Meerbusch, Germany	W50	Clay	(Serbia) Lola Radivojević	6–4, 6–3
Win	9–7	Oct 2024	ITF Seville, Spain	W35	Clay	(Belgium) Marie Benoît	2–6, 6–2, 6–3
Win	10–7	Feb 2025	ITF Mâcon, France	W50	Hard (i)	(France) Tiantsoa Rakotomanga Rajaonah	6–0, 7–5
Win	11–7	Mar 2025	Kiskút Open, Hungary	W75	Clay (i)	(Hungary) Amarissa Tóth	2–6, 7–5, 6–3
Win	12–7	Aug 2025	Ladies Open Amstetten, Austria	W75	Clay	(Austria) Lilli Tagger	6–2, 6–4
Win	13–7	Sep 2025	Ladies Open Vienna, Austria	W75	Clay	(Romania) Miriam Bulgaru	3–6, 6–2, 6–3
Loss	13–8	Feb 2026	Prague Open, Czech Republic	W75	Hard (i)	(Czech Republic) Tereza Martincová	3–6, 4–6

=== Doubles: 5 (2 titles, 3 runner-ups) ===
Legend W60/75 tournaments W25/35 tournaments	Finals by surface Clay (2–2) Carpet (0–1)

Result	W–L	Date	Tournament	Tier	Surface	Partner	Opponents	Score
Win	1–0	Jan 2022	ITF Cairo, Egypt	W25	Clay	(Austria) Melanie Klaffner	(India) Prarthana Thombare (Hungary) Adrienn Nagy	7–5, 6–3
Loss	1–1	Sep 2023	ITF Vienna, Austria	W60	Clay	(Austria) Melanie Klaffner	(Romania) Irina Bara (Poland) Weronika Falkowska	3–6, 6–2, [11–13]
Loss	1–2	Oct 2023	ITF Heraklion, Greece	W25	Clay	(Austria) Melanie Klaffner	(Romania) Ilinca Amariei (Romania) Anca Todoni	0–6, 7–5, [1–10]
Loss	1–3	Feb 2025	ITF Herrenschwanden, Switzerland	W35	Carpet (i)	(Georgia (country)) Mariam Bolkvadze	Ekaterina Ovcharenko (United Kingdom) Emily Webley-Smith	6–7^{(1)}, 6–2, [9–11]
Win	2–3	May 2025	Internazionali di Brescia, Italy	W75	Clay	(Poland) Maja Chwalińska	(Czech Republic) Gabriela Knutson (Latvia) Darja Semeņistaja	6–0, 6–3

== Junior finals ==
=== ITF Junior Circuit ===
Legend
Category G1
Category G2
Category G3
Category G4
Category G5

==== Singles (4–1) ====
Result	No.	Date	Tournament	Grade	Surface	Opponent	Score
Win	1–0	Aug 2017	ITF Maaseik, Belgium	G4	Clay	(Germany) Anne Knüttel	6–2 ret.
Win	2–0	Aug 2017	ITF Clermont-Ferrand, France	G4	Clay	(France) Alice Tubello	6–2, 6–1
Win	3–0	Sep 2017	ITF Kreuzlingen, Switzerland	G5	Clay	(Germany) Nastasja Schunk	6–3, 6–1
Loss	3–1	Oct 2017	ITF Almere, Netherlands	G4	Hard	(Belgium) Victoria Kalaitzis	2–6, 4–6
Win	4–1	Jan 2018	ITF Hammamet, Tunisia	G2	Clay	(Malta) Helene Pellicano	6–4, 6–3

==== Doubles (3–2) ====
Result	No.	Date	Tournament	Grade	Surface	Partner	Opponents	Score
Loss	0–1	Aug 2017	ITF Clermont-Ferrand, France	G4	Clay	(Austria) Mavie Österreicher	(France) Flavie Brugnone (France) Anaëlle Leclercq	4–6, 6–7^{(3)}
Win	1–1	Sep 2017	ITF Kreuzlingen, Switzerland	G5	Clay	(Switzerland) Valentina Ryser	(Italy) Chiara Girelli (Italy) Sofia Rocchetti	3–6, 6–2, [10–4]
Win	2–1	Mar 2018	ITF Benicarló, Spain	G2	Clay	(France) Diane Parry	(Spain) Jéssica Bouzas Maneiro (Italy) Nuria Brancaccio	7–6^{(2)}, 5–7, [10–8]
Win	3–1	Jul 2018	ITF Plzeň, Czech Republic	G2	Clay	(France) Loudmilla Bencheikh	(Poland) Martyna Kubka (Croatia) Iva Zelić	w/o
Loss	3–2	Jun 2019	ITF Plzeň, Czech Republic	G2	Clay	(Germany) Mara Guth	(Czech Republic) Barbora Palicová (United States) Hibah Shaikh	0–6, 2–6

== National representation ==
Kraus was nominated to make her Fed Cup debut for Austria in 2019, while the team was competing in the Europe/Africa Zone Group II, the opponent forfeited the match.

=== Fed Cup / BJK Cup ===
Group membership World Group (0–2) World Group Play-off (3–3) World Group II World Group II Play-off Europe/Africa Group (6–6)	Matches by surface Hard (3–4) Clay (7–7)	Matches by setting Indoors (5–5) Outdoors (5–6)

=== Singles (5–6) ===
Edition	Stage	Date	Location	Against	Surface	Opponent	W/L	Score
2020 Fed Cup	ZG1 Pool B	6 Feb 2020	Tallinn, Estonia	Greece	Hard (i)	Valentini Grammatikopoulou	L	4–6, 4–6
2022 BJK Cup	ZG1 Pool B	11 Apr 2022	Antalya, Turkey	Bulgaria	Clay	Julia Terziyska	W	6–1, 6–4
2022 BJK Cup	ZG1 Pool B	12 Apr 2022	Antalya, Turkey	Slovenia	Clay	Kaja Juvan	L	1–6, 4–6
2022 BJK Cup	ZG1 Pool B	13 Apr 2022	Antalya, Turkey	(Georgia (country)) Georgia	Clay	Nino Natsvlishvili	W	6–4, 6–2
2022 BJK Cup	ZG1 Pool B	14 Apr 2022	Antalya, Turkey	Sweden	Clay	Jacqueline Cabaj Awad	W	6–2, 6–2
2022 BJK Cup	ZG1 Pool B	15 Apr 2022	Antalya, Turkey	Croatia	Clay	Donna Vekić	L	5–7, 3–6
2022 BJK Cup	ZG1 Playoff	11 Nov 2022	Vienna, Austria	Latvia	Clay (i)	Daniela Vismane	W	6–3, 6–1
2022 BJK Cup	ZG1 Playoff	12 Nov 2022	Vienna, Austria	Latvia	Clay (i)	Jeļena Ostapenko	L	0–6, 6–3, 1–6
2023 BJK Cup	Qualifying round	14 April 2023	Delray Beach, USA	(United States) USA	Hard	Jessica Pegula	L	0–6, 5–7
2023 BJK Cup	ZG1 Playoff	11 Nov 2023	Schwechat, Austria	Mexico	Clay (i)	Giuliana Olmos	W	7–5, 6–2
2023 BJK Cup	ZG1 Playoff	12 Nov 2023	Schwechat, Austria	Mexico	Clay (i)	Fernanda Contreras	L	6–0, 2–6, 4–6

=== Doubles (5–5) ===
Edition	Stage	Date	Location	Against	Surface	Partner	Opponents	W/L	Score
2019 Fed Cup	ZG2 Pool A	8 Feb 2019	Esch-sur-Alzette, Luxembourg	Bosnia and Herzegovina	Hard (i)	Mira Antonitsch	Anita Husarić; Jelena Simić	W	w/o *
2020 Fed Cup	ZG1 Pool B	5 Feb 2020	Tallinn, Estonia	Italy	Hard (i)	Mira Antonitsch	Giulia Gatto-Monticone; Martina Trevisan	L	4–6, 4–6
2020 Fed Cup	ZG1 Pool B	6 Feb 2020	Tallinn, Estonia	Greece	Hard (i)	Mira Antonitsch	Valentini Grammatikopoulou; Despina Papamichail	W	7–5, 7–6^{(2)}
2020 Fed Cup	ZG1 Pool B	7 Feb 2020	Tallinn, Estonia	Estonia	Hard (i)	Mira Antonitsch	Valeria Gorlats; Saara Orav	W	6–2, 4–6, 6–0
2022 BJK Cup	ZG1 Pool B	11 Apr 2022	Antalya, Turkey	Bulgaria	Clay	Barbara Haas	Isabella Shinikova; Julia Terziyska	L	7–6^{(6)}, 2–6, 4–6
2022 BJK Cup	ZG1 Pool B	12 Apr 2022	Antalya, Turkey	Slovenia	Clay	Melanie Klaffner	Kaja Juvan; Tamara Zidanšek	L	6–2, 4–6, 2–6
2022 BJK Cup	ZG1 Pool B	14 Apr 2022	Antalya, Turkey	Sweden	Clay	Melanie Klaffner	Caijsa Hennemann; Kajsa Rinaldo Persson	W	4–6, 7–5, 6–0
2022 BJK Cup	ZG1 Playoff	12 Nov 2022	Vienna, Austria	Latvia	Clay (i)	Melanie Klaffner	Diāna Marcinkēviča; Jeļena Ostapenko	W	7–5, 6–3
2023 BJK Cup	Qualifying round	15 April 2023	Delray Beach, USA	(United States) USA	Hard	Melanie Klaffner	Coco Gauff; Caty McNally	L	1-6, 4–6
2023 BJK Cup	ZG1 Playoff	12 Nov 2023	Schwechat, Austria	(Mexico) Latvia	Clay (i)	Melanie Klaffner	Fernanda Contreras; Giuliana Olmos	L	3–6, 6–3, 7–6^{(6)}

* walkover doesn't count in her overall record.
