= Nadiia Kolb =

Ukrainian tennis player (born 1993)

- Full name: Nadiia Leonidivna Kolb
- Country (sports): Ukraine
- Born: 19 January 1993 (age 33) Yevpatoria, Ukraine
- Plays: Right (two-handed backhand)
- Prize money: $100,411

Singles
- Career record: 203–193
- Highest ranking: No. 584 (12 August 2024)
- Current ranking: No. 797 (23 December 2024)

Doubles
- Career record: 191–161
- Career titles: 10 ITF
- Highest ranking: No. 173 (9 September 2024)
- Current ranking: No. 282 (23 December 2024)
- Last updated on: 23 December 2024.

Nadiia Leonidivna Kolb (Ukrainian: Надія Леонідівна Колб; born 19 January 1993) is a Ukrainian tennis player.

She has a career-high WTA singles ranking of No. 584, achieved on 12 August 2024. Her best doubles ranking of world No. 173, she achieved on 9 September 2024.

Nadiia was born in the city of Yevpatoriya. Her younger sister Maryna, who is also a professional tennis player, is her regular doubles partner.

Nadiia made her WTA Tour main-draw debut at the 2024 Hong Kong Tennis Open, partnering with younger sister Maryna Kolb in doubles. They defeated Japanese duo Aoi Ito and Kyōka Okamura in the first round. In the quarter-finals, they were defeated by Norwegian Ulrikke Eikeri and Japanese Makoto Ninomiya.

== ITF Circuit finals ==
=== Singles: 2 (0 titles, 2 runner-ups) ===
Legend
W15 tournaments

Result	W–L	Date	Tournament	Tier	Surface	Opponent	Score
Loss	0–1	Oct 2022	ITF Baza, Spain	W15	Hard	(Argentina) Lucía Peyre	3–6, 3–6
Loss	0–2	Aug 2024	ITF Savitaipale, Finland	W15	Clay	(Poland) Zuzanna Pawlikowska	7–5, 2–6, 1–6

=== Doubles: 38 (11 titles, 27 runner-up) ===
Legend
W80 tournaments
W60/75 tournaments
W40/50 tournaments
W25/35 tournaments
W10/15 tournaments

Result	No.	Date	Tournament	Tier	Surface	Partner	Opponents	Score
Loss	0–1	Jul 2013	ITF Istanbul, Turkey	W10	Hard	(Ukraine) Maryna Kolb	Polina Leykina; Lidziya Marozava	6–7^{(2)}, 5–7
Loss	0–2	Nov 2013	ITF Heraklion, Greece	W10	Carpet	(Ukraine) Maryna Kolb	(Hungary) Csilla Borsányi (Romania) Ilka Csöregi	6–4, 3–6, [9–11]
Loss	0–3	Jun 2014	ITF Galați, Romania	W10	Clay	(Ukraine) Maryna Kolb	(Romania) Camelia Hristea (Romania) Patricia Maria Țig	3–6, 1–6
Loss	0–4	Aug 2014	ITF Ostrava, Czech Republic	W10	Clay	(Ukraine) Maryna Kolb	(Czech Republic) Lenka Kunčíková (Czech Republic) Karolína Stuchlá	6–4, 2–6, [7–10]
Loss	0–5	Oct 2014	ITF Oslo, Norway	W10	Hard (i)	(Ukraine) Maryna Kolb	(United States) Alexa Guarachi (Serbia) Nina Stojanović	4–6, 6–7^{(7)}
Loss	0–6	Nov 2014	ITF Oslo, Norway	W10	Hard (i)	(Ukraine) Maryna Kolb	(United States) Alexa Guarachi; Daria Lodikova	3–6, 6–2, [6–10]
Loss	0–7	Jun 2015	ITF Niš, Serbia	W10	Clay	(Ukraine) Maryna Kolb	(Argentina) Ailen Crespo Azconzábal (Argentina) Ana Victoria Gobbi Monllau	1–6, 2–6
Loss	0–8	Jul 2015	ITF Prokuplje, Serbia	W10	Clay	(Ukraine) Maryna Kolb	(Spain) Estrella Cabeza Candela (Australia) Alexandra Nancarrow	6–2, 4–6, [6–10]
Loss	0–9	Jul 2015	ITF Iași, Romania	W10	Clay	(Ukraine) Maryna Kolb	(Romania) Ioana Loredana Roșca (Romania) Oana Georgeta Simion	3–6, 5–7
Loss	0–10	Aug 2015	ITF Plovdiv, Bulgaria	W10	Clay	(Ukraine) Maryna Kolb	(Australia) Alexandra Nancarrow; Yana Sizikova	3–6, 3–6
Win	1–10	Sep 2015	ITF Prague, Czech Republic	W10	Clay	(Ukraine) Maryna Kolb	(United States) Tina Tehrani (Australia) Karolina Wlodarczak	6–4, 6–2
Loss	1–11	Apr 2016	ITF Győr, Hungary	W10	Clay	(Ukraine) Maryna Kolb	(Romania) Daiana Negreanu (Hungary) Rebeka Stolmár	6–7^{(4)}, 0–6
Loss	1–12	Jun 2016	ITF Szczawno-Zdrój, Poland	W10	Clay	(Ukraine) Maryna Kolb	(Poland) Olga Brózda (Ukraine) Anastasiya Shoshyna	2–6, 6–7^{(4)}
Win	2–12	Sep 2016	ITF Chișinău, Moldova	W10	Clay	(Ukraine) Maryna Kolb	(Ukraine) Veronika Kapshay (Ukraine) Angelina Shakhraychuk	5–7, 7–5, [10–6]
Loss	2–13	Sep 2017	ITF Prague, Czech Republic	W15	Clay	(Germany) Natalie Pröse	(Czech Republic) Anastasia Dețiuc (Czech Republic) Johana Marková	2–6, 2–6
Win	3–13	Sep 2017	ITF Kyiv, Ukraine	W15	Clay	(Ukraine) Maryna Kolb	(Italy) Martina Colmegna (Italy) Michele Alexandra Zmău	6–2, 4–6, [13–11]
Loss	3–14	Nov 2017	ITF Stockholm, Sweden	W15	Hard (i)	(Ukraine) Maryna Kolb	(Norway) Malene Helgø (Sweden) Fanny Östlund	w/o
Win	4–14	Nov 2017	ITF Minsk, Belarus	W15	Hard (i)	(Ukraine) Maryna Kolb	(France) Manon Arcangioli; Alena Tarasova	5–7, 6–4, [10–7]
Loss	4–15	Dec 2017	ITF Milovice, Czech Republic	W15	Hard (i)	(Ukraine) Maryna Kolb	(Slovakia) Jana Jablonovská (Germany) Lena Papadakis	1–6, 3–6
Win	5–15	Sep 2018	ITF Chornomorsk, Ukraine	W15	Clay	(Ukraine) Maryna Kolb	(Moldova) Alexandra Perper (Moldova) Anastasia Vdovenco	6–4, 6–4
Win	6–15	Aug 2022	ITF Bydgoszcz, Poland	W15	Clay	(Ukraine) Maryna Kolb	Valeriia Olianovskaia (Poland) Stefania Rogozińska Dzik	6–4, 1–6, [10–7]
Win	7–15	Sep 2022	ITF Ceuta, Spain	W15	Hard	(Ukraine) Maryna Kolb	(Spain) Lucía Llinares Domingo (Spain) Olga Parres Azcoitia	6–4, 6–2
Loss	7–16	Oct 2022	ITF Baza, Spain	W15	Hard	(Ukraine) Maryna Kolb	(Spain) Lucía Llinares Domingo (Spain) Olga Parres Azcoitia	5–7, 6–2, [11–13]
Loss	7–17	Oct 2022	ITF Seville, Spain	W25	Clay	(Ukraine) Maryna Kolb	(Turkey) İpek Öz (Slovenia) Nika Radišić	5–7, 6–7^{(3)}
Win	8–17	Sep 2022	ITF Gdańsk, Poland	W15	Clay	(Ukraine) Maryna Kolb	(Poland) Gina Feistel (Poland) Marcelina Podlińska	6–0, 6–1
Loss	8–18	Sep 2023	ITF Frýdek-Místek, Czech Republic	W25	Clay	(Ukraine) Maryna Kolb	(Japan) Mana Kawamura (Czech Republic) Linda Klimovičová	1–6, 3–6
Loss	8–19	Sep 2023	ITF Féminin Le Neubourg, France	W80	Hard	(Ukraine) Maryna Kolb	(France) Fiona Ferro; Alina Korneeva	6–7^{(7)}, 5–7
Loss	8–20	Sep 2023	ITF Santarém, Portugal	W25	Hard	(Ukraine) Maryna Kolb	(United States) Dalayna Hewitt (United States) Madison Sieg	6–4, 2–6, [10–12]
Win	9–20	Oct 2023	ITF Seville, Spain	W25	Clay	(Ukraine) Maryna Kolb	(Romania) Cristina Dinu (Greece) Sapfo Sakellaridi	6–1, 6–1
Win	10–20	Oct 2023	ITF Faro, Portugal	W25	Hard	(Ukraine) Maryna Kolb	(Latvia) Diāna Marcinkēviča (Greece) Sapfo Sakellaridi	6–4, 6–3
Loss	10–21	Oct 2023	ITF Castellón, Spain	W15	Clay	(Ukraine) Maryna Kolb	(Switzerland) Marie Mettraux (Germany) Chantal Sauvant	6–3, 1–6, [5–10]
Loss	10–22	Nov 2023	ITF Nules, Spain	W15	Clay	(Ukraine) Maryna Kolb	(Spain) Yvonne Cavallé Reimers (Spain) Ángela Fita Boluda	1–6, 2–6
Loss	10–23	Aug 2024	ITF Bytom, Poland	W50	Clay	(Ukraine) Maryna Kolb	(Italy) Nicole Fossa Huergo (Kazakhstan) Zhibek Kulambayeva	6–7^{(6)}, 2–6
Loss	10–24	Aug 2024	ITF Bydgoszcz, Poland	W35	Clay	(Ukraine) Maryna Kolb	(Burundi) Sada Nahimana (Japan) Rinon Okuwaki	4–6, 1–6
Loss	10–25	Aug 2024	ITF Brașov, Romania	W35	Clay	(Ukraine) Maryna Kolb	Ksenia Laskutova (Slovakia) Nina Vargová	3–6, 4–6
Loss	10–26	Sep 2024	Ladies Open Vienna, Austria	W75	Clay	(Ukraine) Maryna Kolb	(United Kingdom) Emily Appleton (France) Estelle Cascino	4–6, 6–7^{(1)}
Loss	10–27	Jan 2026	ITF Porto, Portugal	W75	Hard (i)	(Slovenia) Kristina Novak	(Portugal) Francisca Jorge (Portugal) Matilde Jorge	2–6, 4–6
Win	11–27	Feb 2026	ITF Heraklion, Greece	W35	Clay	(Morocco) Yasmine Kabbaj	(Germany) Katharina Hobgarski (Slovakia) Nina Vargová	6–2, 6–1
