= Adrienn Nagy =

Hungarian tennis player (born 2001)

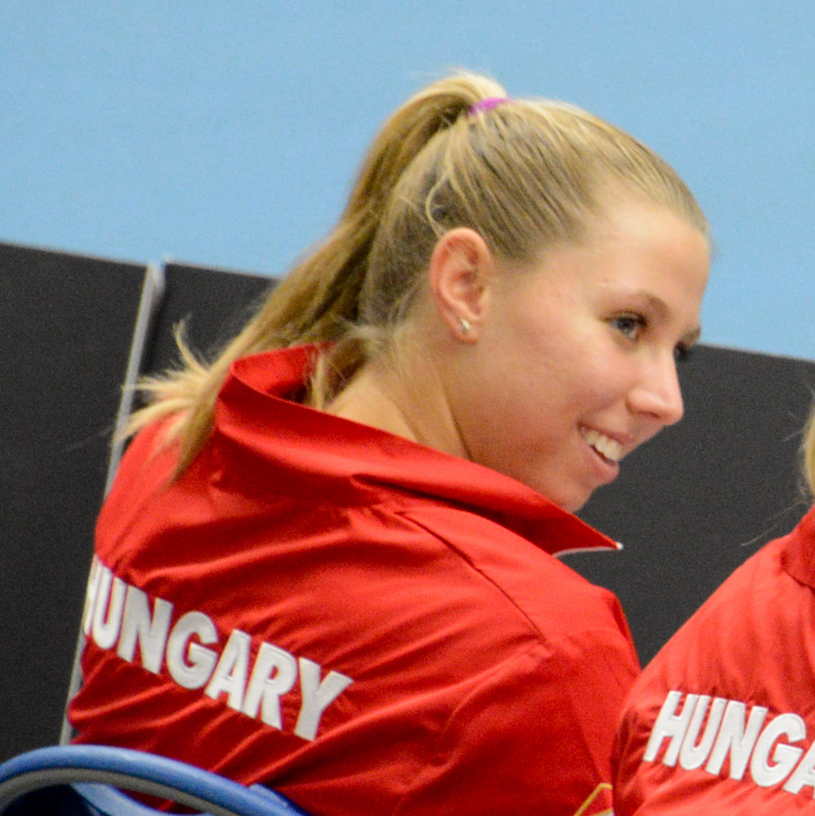
- Nagy in 2019
- Country (sports): Hungary
- Born: 24 March 2001 (age 25) Budapest, Hungary
- Plays: Right (two-handed backhand)
- Prize money: $106,516

Singles
- Career record: 203–181
- Career titles: 3 ITF
- Highest ranking: No. 504 (26 June 2023)
- Current ranking: No. 536 (24 August 2026)

Doubles
- Career record: 189–140
- Career titles: 18 ITF
- Highest ranking: No. 199 (24 August 2026)
- Current ranking: No. 199 (24 August 2026)

Team competitions
- Fed Cup: 2–0
- Last updated on: 27 August 2026.

Adrienn Nagy (born 24 March 2001) is a Hungarian tennis player. She has career-high WTA rankings of 504 in singles, reached on 26 June 2023, and No. 199 in doubles, achieved on 24 August 2026. Nagy has won three singles titles and 18 doubles titles on the ITF Women's World Tour.

== Juniors ==
Nagy reached an ITF junior combined ranking of No. 19 on 28 January 2019.

She won the 2018 Orange Bowl in doubles with Park So-hyun and won the 2019 Australian Open on girls' doubles with Natsumi Kawaguchi.

=== Grand Slam performance ===
Singles:

- Australian Open: 3R (2019)
- French Open: 1R (2018, 2019)
- Wimbledon: 1R (2018, 2019)
- US Open: 2R (2018, 2019)

Doubles:

- Australian Open: W (2019)
- French Open: SF (2019)
- Wimbledon: 2R (2019)
- US Open: SF (2019)

In January 2020, Nagy went to the University of Texas, and played for the Texas Longhorns team until March 2020, when the NCAA season was interrupted due to the COVID-19 pandemic.

== Personal life ==
Her mother, Virág Csurgó, is a former professional tennis player, who represented Hungary at the 1996 Summer Olympics.

== WTA 125 finals ==
=== Doubles: 1 (runner-up) ===
Result	W–L	Date	Tournament	Surface	Partner	Opponents	Score
Loss	0–1	Jul 2026	Palermo Ladies Open, Italy	Clay	(United States) Rasheeda McAdoo	Anastasia Tikhonova (Slovenia) Tamara Zidanšek	4–6, 4–6

== ITF Circuit finals ==
=== Singles: 6 (3 titles, 3 runner-ups) ===
Legend W35 tournaments (0–1) W15 tournaments (3–2)	Finals by surface Hard (2–2) Clay (1–1)

Result	W–L	Date	Tournament	Tier	Surface	Opponent	Score
Win	1–0	Nov 2019	ITF Cancún, Mexico	W15	Hard	(United States) Rachel Gailis	6–3, 6–2
Loss	1–1	Oct 2024	ITF Villena, Spain	W15	Hard	(Netherlands) Joy de Zeeuw	6–7^{(7)}, 3–6
Loss	1–2	Jan 2025	ITF Monastir, Tunisia	W15	Hard	(Spain) Eva Guerrero Álvarez	5–7, 1–6
Win	2–2	Nov 2025	ITF Lousada, Portugal	W15	Hard (i)	(Switzerland) Stefaniya Pushkar	6–3, 6–2
Win	3–2	Jun 2026	ITF Mogyoród, Hungary	W15	Clay	(Slovakia) Eszter Méri	2–6, 6–3, 6–3
Loss	1–2	Aug 2026	ITF Bistrița, Romania	W35	Clay	(Romania) Teodora Miron	3–6, 6–2, 4–6

=== Doubles: 33 (18 titles, 15 runner-ups) ===
Legend W75 tournaments W25/35 tournaments W15 tournaments	Finals by surface Hard (5–6) Clay (13–9)

Result	W–L	Date	Tournament	Tier	Surface	Partner	Opponents	Score
Loss	0–1	Oct 2017	ITF Lisbon, Portugal	W15	Hard	(Czech Republic) Karolína Beránková	(Spain) Alba Carrillo Marín (Portugal) Inês Murta	6–4, 1–6, [4–10]
Loss	0–2	Oct 2018	ITF Ashkelon, Israel	W15	Hard	(Hungary) Dorka Drahota-Szabó	(Russia) Anastasia Pribylova (Russia) Anna Pribylova	5–7, 4–6
Loss	0–3	Mar 2019	ITF Antalya, Turkey	W15	Clay	(Ukraine) Viktoriia Dema	(Sweden) Caijsa Hennemann (Sweden) Melis Yasar	1–0 ret.
Win	1–3	Sep 2019	ITF Kaposvár, Hungary	W25	Clay	(Hungary) Dalma Gálfi	(Hungary) Anna Bondár (Hungary) Réka Luca Jani	7–6^{(5)}, 2–6, [10–3]
Win	2–3	Nov 2019	ITF Cancún, Mexico	W15	Hard	(Israel) Shavit Kimchi	(France) Tiphanie Fiquet (Croatia) Tea Jandrić	6–3, 6–2
Loss	2–4	Sep 2020	ITF Otočec, Slovenia	W15	Clay	(Hungary) Dorka Drahota-Szabó	(Slovenia) Tina Cvetkovič (Slovenia) Pia Lovrič	3–6, 1–6
Win	3–4	Jan 2021	ITF Antalya, Turkey	W15	Clay	(Slovenia) Pia Lovrič	(Turkey) Ayla Aksu (Bulgaria) Ani Vangelova	6–4, 7–5
Win	4–4	Mar 2021	ITF New Delhi, India	W15	Hard	(Slovenia) Pia Lovrič	(India) Sowjanya Bavisetti (India) Prarthana Thombare	6–2, 6–3
Win	5–4	Apr 2021	ITF Antalya, Turkey	W15	Clay	(Israel) Shavit Kimchi	(Japan) Misaki Matsuda (South Korea) Lee So-ra	5–7, 6–2, [10–8]
Win	6–4	May 2021	ITF Oeiras, Portugal	W25	Clay	(South Korea) Park So-hyun	(India) Riya Bhatia (Brazil) Gabriela Cé	6–4, 6–0
Loss	6–5	Aug 2021	ITF Bratislava, Slovakia	W15	Clay	(Slovenia) Pia Lovrič	(Slovakia) Chantal Škamlová (Slovakia) Radka Zelníčková	3–6, 6–7^{(5)}
Loss	6–6	Oct 2021	ITF Budapest, Hungary	W25	Clay	(Hungary) Natália Szabanin	(Hungary) Dorka Drahota-Szabó (Sweden) Caijsa Hennemann	w/o
Loss	6–7	Oct 2021	ITF Antalya, Turkey	W15	Clay	(Slovakia) Romana Čisovská	(Hungary) Dorka Drahota-Szabó (Hungary) Amarissa Tóth	3–6, 6–2, [4–10]
Loss	6–8	Nov 2021	ITF Haabneeme, Estonia	W25	Hard (i)	(Poland) Maja Chwalińska	(United States) Jessica Failla (Japan) Chihiro Muramatsu	3–6, 4–6
Loss	6–9	Jan 2022	ITF Cairo, Egypt	W25	Clay	(India) Prarthana Thombare	(Austria) Melanie Klaffner (Austria) Sinja Kraus	5–7, 3–6
Loss	6–10	Feb 2022	Porto Indoor, Portugal	W25	Hard (i)	(India) Prarthana Thombare	(Greece) Valentini Grammatikopoulou (Netherlands) Quirine Lemoine	2–6, 0–6
Loss	6–11	Oct 2022	ITF Quinta do Lago, Portugal	W25	Hard	(South Korea) Ku Yeon-woo	(Portugal) Francisca Jorge (Portugal) Matilde Jorge	4–6, 4–6
Win	7–11	Jul 2023	ITF Koge, Denmark	W25	Clay	(Slovenia) Pia Lovrič	(France) Tiphanie Lemaître; Anna Zyryanova	6–4, 6–0
Win	8–11	May 2024	ITF Yecla, Spain	W35	Hard	(Germany) Joëlle Steur	(United States) Jessica Failla (Peru) Anastasia Iamachkine	6–3, 6–4
Loss	8–12	Aug 2024	ITF Savitaipale, Finland	W15	Clay	(Italy) Chiara Girelli	(Lithuania) Klaudija Bubelytė (Estonia) Anet Angelika Koskel	6–1, 2–6, [6–10]
Win	9–12	Aug 2024	ITF Kraków, Poland	W15	Clay	(Czech Republic) Linda Ševčíková	(Slovakia) Salma Drugdová (Czech Republic) Ivana Šebestová	7–6^{(2)}, 6–3
Loss	9–13	Sep 2024	ITF Trnava, Slovakia	W15	Hard (i)	(Czech Republic) Ivana Šebestová	(Denmark) Rebecca Munk Mortensen (Denmark) Johanne Svendsen	5–7, 6–7^{(2)}
Win	10–13	Oct 2024	ITF Villena, Spain	W15	Hard	(Netherlands) Joy de Zeeuw	(Netherlands) Rose Marie Nijkamp (Netherlands) Isis Louise van den Broek	w/o
Loss	10–14	Nov 2024	ITF Antalya, Turkiye	W15	Clay	(Czech Republic) Linda Ševčíková	(Romania) Ștefania Bojică (Romania) Anastasia Safta	6–7^{(3)}, 3–6
Win	11–14	Feb 2025	ITF Bucharest, Romania	W15	Hard (i)	(Germany) Emily Seibold	(Slovakia) Katarína Strešnáková (France) Marine Szostak	7–6^{(5)}, 6–1
Win	12–14	Mar 2025	ITF Heraklion, Greece	W15	Clay	(Germany) Katharina Hobgarski	(Bulgaria) Rositsa Dencheva (Germany) Franziska Sziedat	6–1, 6–1
Win	13–14	May 2025	ITF Vall de Uxó, Spain	W15	Clay	(Poland) Anna Hertel	(Italy) Enola Chiesa (France) Marine Szostak	6–4, 6–1
Win	14–14	Aug 2025	ITF Kraków, Poland	W15	Clay	(Czech Republic) Linda Ševčíková	(Poland) Gina Feistel (Poland) Marcelina Podlińska	6–3, 6–0
Win	15–14	Sep 2025	ITF Reus, Spain	W35	Clay	(Germany) Joëlle Steur	(Croatia) Lucija Ćirić Bagarić (France) Tiphanie Lemaître	6–1, 3–6, [11–9]
Loss	15–15	Jun 2026	ITF Klosters, Switzerland	W35	Clay	(Netherlands) Merel Hoedt	(Czech Republic) Michaela Bayerlová (Germany) Eva Marie Voracek	6–4, 6–7^{(1)}, [5–10]
Win	16–15	Jul 2026	ITS Cup, Czech Republic	W75	Clay	(Czech Republic) Ivana Šebestová	(Finland) Laura Hietaranta (Slovakia) Nina Vargová	3–6, 7–6^{(6)}, [10–5]
Win	17–15	Aug 2026	ITF Bydgoszcz, Poland	W35	Clay	(Germany) Joëlle Steur	(Italy) Gaia Maduzzi (Italy) Viola Turini	6–1, 6–7^{(6)}, [10–8]
Win	18–15	Aug 2026	ITF Bistrița, Romania	W35	Clay	(Romania) Oana Georgeta Simion	(Romania) Patricia Georgiana Goina (Romania) Simona Ogescu	6–1, 6–3

== Junior finals ==
=== Grand Slam tournaments ===
==== Doubles: 1 (title) ====
Result	Year	Tournament	Surface	Partner	Opponents	Score
Win	2019	Australian Open	Hard	(Japan) Natsumi Kawaguchi	(United States) Emma Navarro (United States) Chloe Beck	6–4, 6–4

=== ITF Junior Circuit ===
Legend
Category GA
Category G1
Category G2
Category G3
Category G4
Category G5

==== Singles: 5 (3 titles, 2 runner-ups) ====
Result	W–L	Date	Location	Grade	Surface	Opponent	Score
Loss	0–1	Jan 2016	ITF Abu Dhabi, UAE	G4	Hard	(Italy) Lisa Piccinetti	6–4, 3–6, 3–6
Loss	0–2	Sep 2016	ITF Cape Town, South Africa	G4	Hard	(United Kingdom) Holly Fischer	4–6, 2–6
Win	1–2	Oct 2016	ITF Stellenbosch, South Africa	G3	Hard	(United Kingdom) Holly Fischer	6–4, 6–4
Win	2–2	Apr 2018	ITF Tunis, Tunisia	G3	Hard	(Switzerland) Joanne Züger	5–7, 6–2, 6–0
Win	3–2	Apr 2018	ITF Piešťany, Slovakia	G2	Clay	(Finland) Oona Orpana	6–2, 1–6, 6–4

==== Doubles: 15 (12 titles, 3 runner-ups) ====
Result	W–L	Date	Tournament	Grade	Surface	Partner	Opponents	Score
Win	1–0	Nov 2015	ITF Fujairah City, UAE	G5	Hard	(Malta) Helene Pellicano	(Georgia (country)) Ana Makatsaria (Moldova) Vitalia Stamat	5–2 ret.
Win	2–0	Aug 2016	ITF Split, Croatia	G5	Clay	(United Kingdom) Maria Budin	(Australia) Stephanie Belovukovic (Serbia) Aleksandra Stanković	6–0, 6–1
Win	3–0	Sep 2016	ITF Cape Town, South Africa	G4	Hard	(South Africa) Margo Landmann	(France) Maëlys Bougrat (France) Diane Parry	7–5, 6–4
Win	4–0	Oct 2016	ITF Stellenbosch, South Africa	G3	Hard	(Netherlands) Lexie Stevens	(United States) Dakota Fordham (Thailand) Mai Napatt Nirundorn	6–0, 6–3
Win	5–0	Apr 2017	ITF Cap-d'Ail, France	G2	Clay	(France) Giulia Morlet	(France) Loudmilla Bencheikh (Canada) Layne Sleeth	7–5, 6–1
Win	6–0	Jan 2018	ITF Barranquilla, Colombia	G1	Clay	(France) Mylène Halemai	(United States) Angelica Blake (United States) Kacie Harvey	6–2, 7–5
Win	7–0	Apr 2018	ITF Tunis, Tunisia	G3	Hard	(Hungary) Fanni Gécsek	(Germany) Luisa Meyer auf der Heide (Estonia) Carol Plakk	3–6, 6–1, [10–4]
Win	8–0	May 2018	ITF Budapest, Hungary	G2	Clay	(France) Mylène Halemai	(Italy) Melania Delai (Serbia) Anđela Skrobonja	7–5, 3–6, [13–11]
Win	9–0	May 2018	ITF Gladbeck, Germany	G2	Clay	(France) Giulia Morlet	(Ukraine) Margaryta Bilokin (United States) Vanessa Ong	6–4, 6–1
Loss	9–1	Nov 2018	ITF Campeche, Mexico	G1	Hard	(Japan) Natsumi Kawaguchi	(United States) Hurricane Tyra Black (Turkey) Selin Övünç	6–4, 3–6, [7–10]
Loss	9–2	Nov 2018	ITF Mérida, Mexico	GA	Clay	(France) Giulia Morlet	(United States) Hurricane Tyra Black (United States) Coco Gauff	6–7^{(5)}, 6–4, [7–10]
Win	10–2	Nov 2018	ITF Plantation, United States	GA	Clay	(South Korea) Park So-hyun	(United States) Kacie Harvey (United States) Natasha Subhash	2–6, 7–5, [10–8]
Loss	10–3	Jan 2019	ITF Traralgon, Australia	G1	Hard	(Japan) Natsumi Kawaguchi	(Australia) Olivia Gadecki (Australia) Megan Smith	5–7, 6–3, [6–10]
Loss	11–3	Apr 2019	ITF Vrsar, Croatia	G1	Clay	(Israel) Shavit Kimchi	(Latvia) Kamilla Bartone (Russia) Oksana Selekhmeteva	6–7^{(2)}, 1–6
Win	12–3	May 2019	ITF Milan, Italy	GA	Clay	(Japan) Natsumi Kawaguchi	(Burundi) Sada Nahimana (South Korea) Park So-hyun	6–1, 6–3

== National representation ==
=== Fed Cup/Billie Jean King Cup ===
Nagy made her debut for the Hungary Fed Cup team in 2019, while the team was competing in the Europe/Africa Zone Group I.

Group membership World Group World Group Play-off World Group II World Group II Play-off Europe/Africa Group (5–4)	Matches by surface Hard (2–0) Clay (3–4)	Matches by type Singles (3–3) Doubles (2–1)	Matches by setting Indoors (2–0) Outdoors (3–4)

==== Singles (3–3) ====
Edition	Stage	Date	Location	Against	Surface	Opponent	W/L	Score
2019	Z1 PO	Feb 2019	Bath (GBR)	Croatia	Hard (i)	Tena Lukas	W	6–3, 4–6, 6–4
2024	Z1 RR	Apr 2024	Oeiras (POR)	Bulgaria	Clay	Gergana Topalova	W	7–5, 7–6^{(7–4)}
2024	Z1 RR	Apr 2024	Oeiras (POR)	Austria	Clay	Sinja Kraus	L	4–6, 4–6
2024	Z1 RR	Apr 2024	Oeiras (POR)	Denmark	Clay	Johanne Svendsen	L	2–6, 4–6
2024	Z1 PO	Apr 2024	Oeiras (POR)	Sweden	Clay	Lea Nilsson	W	6–3, 6–2
2024	Z1 PO	Apr 2024	Oeiras (POR)	Turkey	Clay	Çağla Büyükakçay	L	4–6, 5–7

==== Doubles (2–1) ====
Edition	Stage	Date	Location	Against	Surface	Partner	Opponents	W/L	Score
2019	Z1 RR	Feb 2019	Bath (GBR)	Slovenia	Hard (i)	Réka Luca Jani	Nina Potočnik; Nika Radišič	W	7–6^{(7–3)}, 4–6, 6–2
2024	Z1 RR	Apr 2024	Oeiras (POR)	Bulgaria	Clay	Natália Szabanin	Lia Karatancheva; Isabella Shinikova	W	6–4, 6–3
2024	Z1 RR	Apr 2024	Oeiras (POR)	Austria	Clay	Natália Szabanin	Melanie Klaffner; Sinja Kraus	L	6–1, 1–6, [5–10]

== Top 5 highest rank wins ==
#	Tournament	Category	Start date	Surface	Rd	Opponent	Rank	Score	ANR
1	Porto, Portugal	ITF W25	14 February 2022	Hard	2R	(Greece) Valentini Grammatikopoulou	No. 189	4–6, 6–4, 6–4	No. 769
2	BJK Cup, Portugal	Team event	8 April 2024	Clay	-	(Bulgaria) Gergana Topalova	No. 253	7–5, 7–6^{(7–4)}	No. 728
3	Open Araba en Femenino, Spain	ITF W60	18 July 2022	Hard	2R	(United States) Danielle Lao	No. 270	5–7, 6–4, 6–2	No. 602
4	Fed Cup, United Kingdom	Team event	9 February 2019	Hard (i)	-	(Croatia) Tena Lukas	No. 272	6–3, 4–6, 6–4	No. N/R
5	Budapest, Hungary	ITF W25	27 September 2021	Clay	1R	(Georgia (country)) Sofia Shapatava	No. 283	6–2, 6–2	No. 767

- statistics correct as of 3 November 2025.

Sporting positions
Preceded by (Chinese Taipei) Joanna Garland / (Japan) Naho Sato	Orange Bowl Girls' Doubles Champion; 2018; With: (South Korea) Park So-hyun	Succeeded by (Philippines) Alexandra Eala / (Belarus) Evialina Laskevich
