= Tena Lukas =

Croatian tennis player (born 1995)

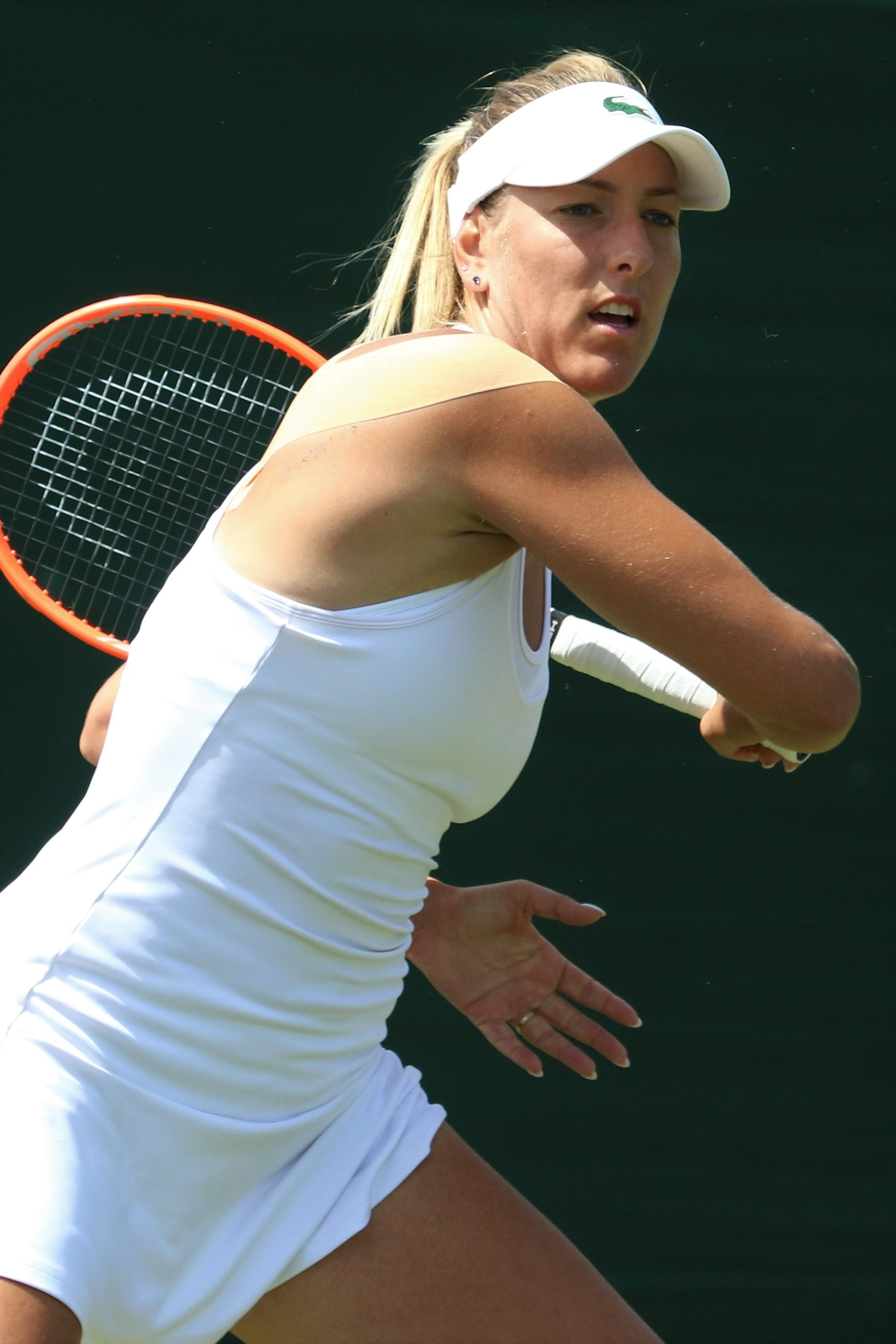
- Lukas at the 2022 Wimbledon Championships
- Country (sports): Croatia
- Born: 10 May 1995 (age 31)
- Plays: Right (two-handed backhand)
- Prize money: $431,975

Singles
- Career record: 475–367
- Career titles: 14 ITF
- Highest ranking: No. 200 (12 September 2022)
- Current ranking: No. 414 (28 September 2026)

Grand Slam singles results
- Australian Open: Q1 (2024)
- French Open: Q1 (2024)
- Wimbledon: Q2 (2024)
- US Open: Q1 (2022)

Doubles
- Career record: 114–118
- Career titles: 1 WTA Challenger, 6 ITF
- Highest ranking: No. 257 (18 July 2022)
- Current ranking: No. 692 (28 September 2026)

Team competitions
- Fed Cup: 6–7
- Last updated on: 1 October 2026.

Tena Lukas (Croatian pronunciation: [lûkaːs]; born 10 May 1995) is a Croatian tennis player.

She has won one doubles title on the WTA Challenger Tour along with 14 singles and six doubles titles on the ITF Circuit. On 12 September 2022, she reached a career-high singles ranking of world No. 200. On 18 July 2022, she peaked at No. 257 in the WTA doubles rankings.

Playing for Croatia, Lukas has a win–loss record of 6–7 in Billie Jean King Cup competitions.

Partnering Dalila Jakupović, she won her first WTA 125 title at the 2022 Makarska International, defeating Olga Danilović and Aleksandra Krunić in the final, in three sets.

== Grand Slam singles performance timeline ==
Key
W	F	SF	QF	#R	RR	Q#	DNQ	A	NH

(W) winner; (F) finalist; (SF) semifinalist; (QF) quarterfinalist; (#R) rounds 4, 3, 2, 1; (RR) round-robin stage; (Q#) qualification round; (DNQ) did not qualify; (A) absent; (NH) not held; (SR) strike rate (events won / competed); (W–L) win–loss record.
To avoid confusion and double counting, these charts are updated at the conclusion of a tournament or when the player's participation has ended.

=== Singles ===
Tournament	2022	2023	2024	W–L
Australian Open	A	A	Q1	0–0
French Open	A	A	Q1	0–0
Wimbledon	Q1	A	Q2	0–0
US Open	Q1	A	A	0–0
Win–loss	0–0	0–0	0–0	0–0

== WTA 125 finals ==
=== Doubles: 1 (title) ===
Result	Date	Tournament	Surface	Partner	Opponents	Score
Win	Jun 2022	Makarska Open, Croatia	Clay	(Slovenia) Dalila Jakupović	(Serbia) Olga Danilović (Serbia) Aleksandra Krunić	5–7, 6–2, [10–5]

== ITF Circuit finals ==
=== Singles: 30 (14 titles, 16 runner-ups) ===
Legend W60/75 tournaments W25/35 tournaments W10/15 tournaments	Finals by surface Hard (0–1) Clay (14–15)

Result	W–L	Date	Tournament	Tier	Surface	Opponent	Score
Loss	0–1	Aug 2011	ITF Brčko, Bosnia and Herzegovina	W10	Clay	(Slovenia) Tjaša Šrimpf	3–6, 3–6
Loss	0–2	Aug 2013	ITF Innsbruck, Austria	W10	Clay	(Sweden) Hilda Melander	2–6, 3–6
Loss	0–3	May 2014	ITF Bol, Croatia	W10	Clay	(Romania) Patricia Maria Țig	2–6, 5–7
Loss	0–4	Jun 2014	ITF Bol, Croatia	W10	Clay	(Peru) Bianca Botto	1–6, 2–6
Loss	0–5	Sep 2014	ITF Bol, Croatia	W10	Clay	(Czech Republic) Gabriela Pantůčková	6–2, 4–6, 2–6
Win	1–5	Sep 2014	ITF Bol, Croatia	W10	Clay	(Czech Republic) Petra Rohanová	6–0, 6–1
Loss	1–6	Nov 2014	ITF Heraklion, Greece	W10	Hard	(Serbia) Natalija Kostić	0–6, 3–6
Win	2–6	May 2015	ITF Bol, Croatia	W10	Clay	(Slovenia) Tamara Zidanšek	6–2, 6–3
Win	3–6	May 2015	ITF Bol, Croatia	W10	Clay	(Croatia) Nina Alibalić	6–4, 4–6, 6–3
Win	4–6	Jul 2015	ITF Aschaffenburg, Germany	W25	Clay	(France) Fiona Ferro	7–5, 6–4
Loss	4–7	Sep 2015	ITF Bol, Croatia	W10	Clay	(Hungary) Anna Bondár	4–6, 2–6
Loss	4–8	Sep 2015	ITF Alphen a/d Rijn, Netherlands	W25	Clay	(Belgium) Marie Benoît	7–5, 3–6, 4–6
Loss	4–9	May 2016	ITF Bol, Croatia	W10	Clay	(Croatia) Tereza Mrdeža	4–6, 6–0, 1–6
Loss	4–10	Oct 2016	ITF Bol, Croatia	W10	Clay	(Slovenia) Kaja Juvan	3–6, 1–6
Win	5–10	Dec 2017	ITF Antalya, Turkey	W15	Clay	(Argentina) Paula Ormaechea	6–4, 6–7^{(5)}, 6–1
Loss	5–11	Dec 2017	ITF Antalya, Turkey	W15	Clay	(Romania) Cristina Dinu	3–6, 3–6
Loss	5–12	Apr 2018	ITF Tučepi, Croatia	W15	Clay	(Croatia) Lea Bošković	6–1, 0–6, 4–6
Loss	5–13	Sep 2018	Royal Cup, Montenegro	W25	Clay	(Czech Republic) Jesika Malečková	2–6, 0–6
Win	6–13	Sep 2019	ITF Vienna, Austria	W25	Clay	(Romania) Miriam Bulgaru	5–7, 6–4, 6–3
Win	7–13	Sep 2019	Royal Cup, Montenegro	W25	Clay	(Russia) Marina Melnikova	6–4, 7–5
Win	8–13	Oct 2019	ITF Santa Margherita di Pula, Italy	W25	Clay	(Brazil) Teliana Pereira	6–4, 6–3
Win	9–13	May 2022	Roma-Tevere Cup, Italy	W60	Clay	(Chile) Bárbara Gatica	6–1, 6–4
Loss	9–14	Aug 2022	Ladies Open Vienna, Austria	W25	Clay	(Hungary) Natália Szabanin	5–7, 3–6
Loss	9–15	Apr 2023	ITF Osijek, Croata	W25	Clay	(Slovenia) Veronika Erjavec	5–7, 2–6
Win	10–15	Jul 2023	ITF Darmstadt, Germany	W25	Clay	(Serbia) Lola Radivojević	6–3, 6–4
Win	11–15	Sep 2023	Ladies Open Vienna, Austria	W60	Clay	(Romania) Miriam Bulgaru	7–5, 6–1
Win	12–15	Feb 2024	ITF Antalya, Turkey	W35	Clay	(Slovenia) Polona Hercog	2–6, 6–3, 6–1
Win	13–15	Sep 2024	Ladies Open Vienna, Austria	W75	Clay	(Bulgaria) Lia Karatancheva	6–4, 6–1
Loss	13–16	Oct 2025	ITF Santa Margherita di Pula, Italy	W35	Clay	(Czech Republic) Julie Paštiková	2–6, 6–4, 2–6
Win	14–16	Feb 2026	ITF Antalya, Turkiye	W15	Clay	(Italy) Giorgia Pedone	6–1, 6–4

=== Doubles: 12 (6 titles, 6 runner-ups) ===
Legend W50 tournaments W25/35 tournaments W10/15 tournaments	Finals by surface Hard (0–1) Clay (5–4) Carpet (1–1)

Result	W–L	Date	Tournament	Tier	Surface	Partner	Opponents	Score
Win	1–0	Sep 2014	ITF Bol, Croatia	W10	Clay	(Croatia) Martina Bašić	(Slovenia) Ana Oparenović (North Macedonia) Magdalena Stoilkovska	6–1, 6–2
Loss	1–1	Nov 2014	ITF Heraklion, Greece	W10	Hard	(Croatia) Martina Bašić	(Hungary) Anna Bondár (Hungary) Dalma Gálfi	6–4, 3–6, [8–10]
Win	2–1	May 2015	ITF Bol, Croatia	W10	Clay	(North Macedonia) Lina Gjorcheska	(Moldova) Alexandra Perper (Moldova) Anastasia Vdovenco	6–0, 6–3
Win	3–1	May 2015	ITF Bol, Croatia	W10	Clay	(Croatia) Iva Primorac	(Argentina) Ailen Crespo Azconzábal (Brazil) Maria Fernanda Alves	4–6, 6–1, [10–7]
Loss	3–2	Feb 2016	ITF Kreuzlingen, Switzerland	W50	Carpet (i)	(United States) Bernarda Pera	(Germany) Antonia Lottner (Switzerland) Amra Sadiković	7–5, 2–6, [5–10]
Win	4–2	Oct 2016	ITF Bol, Croatia	W10	Clay	(Croatia) Iva Primorac	(Slovenia) Nina Potočnik (Hungary) Rebeka Stolmár	6–3, 6–4
Loss	4–3	Apr 2017	ITF Pelham, United States	W25	Clay	(United Kingdom) Amanda Carreras	(United States) Emina Bektas (United States) Sanaz Marand	w/o
Win	5–3	Nov 2017	ITF Zawada, Poland	W25	Carpet (i)	(Czech Republic) Kateřina Vaňková	(Poland) Weronika Jasmina Foryś (Belarus) Nika Shytkouskaya	6–4, 3–6, [10–4]
Loss	5–4	Apr 2018	ITF Tučepi, Croatia	W15	Clay	(Estonia) Saara Orav	(Bosnia and Herzegovina) Nefisa Berberović (Slovenia) Veronika Erjavec	3–6, 3–6
Loss	5–5	Oct 2021	ITF Seville, Spain	W25	Clay	(North Macedonia) Lina Gjorcheska	(Sweden) Caijsa Hennemann (South Korea) Ku Yeon-woo	5–7, 1–6
Loss	5–6	Apr 2022	ITF Santa Margherita di Pula, Italy	W25	Clay	(Croatia) Lea Bošković	(North Macedonia) Lina Gjorcheska (Netherlands) Eva Vedder	5–7, 2–6
Win	6–6	Mar 2024	ITF Alaminos, Cyprus	W35	Clay	(France) Kristina Mladenovic	(Malta) Francesca Curmi (Romania) Cristina Dinu	6–4, 7–5
