= Maryna Kolb =

Ukrainian tennis player (born 1997)

- Full name: Maryna Leonidivna Kolb
- Country (sports): Ukraine
- Born: 13 March 1997 (age 29) Yevpatoria, Ukraine
- Plays: Right (two-handed backhand)
- Prize money: $48,169

Singles
- Career record: 40–95
- Highest ranking: No. 1542 (05 June 2023)
- Current ranking: No. 1929 (28 October 2024)

Doubles
- Career record: 175–140
- Career titles: 10 ITF
- Highest ranking: No. 173 (9 September 2024)
- Current ranking: No. 252 (28 October 2024)
- Last updated on: 01 November 2024.

Maryna Leonidivna Kolb (Ukrainian: Марина Леонідівна Колб; born 13 March 1997) is a Ukrainian tennis player.

She has a career-high WTA doubles ranking of world No. 173, she achieved on 9 September 2024.

Maryna was born in the city of Yevpatoriya. Her older sister Nadiia, who is also a professional tennis player, is her regular doubles partner.

Maryna made her WTA Tour main-draw debut at the 2024 Hong Kong Tennis Open, partnering with older sister Nadiia Kolb in doubles. They defeated Japanese duo Aoi Ito and Kyōka Okamura in the first round.In the quarter-finals, they were defeated by Norwegian Ulrikke Eikeri and Japanese Makoto Ninomiya.

In a 2024 interview with League of Legends journalist Rigas, Kolb stated that she wants to focus on streaming League of Legends when she retires from tennis.

== ITF Circuit finals ==
=== Doubles: 35 (10 titles, 25 runner-up) ===
Legend
W80 tournaments
W60/75 tournaments
W40/50 tournaments
W25/35 tournaments
W10/15 tournaments

| Result | No. | Date | Tournament | Tier | Surface | Partner | Opponents | Score |
|---|---|---|---|---|---|---|---|---|
| Loss | 0–1 | Jul 2013 | ITF Istanbul, Turkey | W10 | Hard | (Ukraine) Nadiia Kolb | Polina Leykina; Lidziya Marozava | 6–7^{(2)}, 5–7 |
| Loss | 0–2 | Nov 2013 | ITF Heraklion, Greece | W10 | Carpet | (Ukraine) Nadiia Kolb | (Hungary) Csilla Borsányi (Romania) Ilka Csöregi | 6–4, 3–6, [9–11] |
| Loss | 0–3 | Jun 2014 | ITF Galați, Romania | W10 | Clay | (Ukraine) Nadiia Kolb | (Romania) Camelia Hristea (Romania) Patricia Maria Țig | 3–6, 1–6 |
| Loss | 0–4 | Aug 2014 | ITF Ostrava, Czech Republic | W10 | Clay | (Ukraine) Nadiia Kolb | (Czech Republic) Lenka Kunčíková (Czech Republic) Karolína Stuchlá | 6–4, 2–6, [7–10] |
| Loss | 0–5 | Oct 2014 | ITF Oslo, Norway | W10 | Hard (i) | (Ukraine) Nadiia Kolb | (United States) Alexa Guarachi (Serbia) Nina Stojanović | 4–6, 6–7^{(7)} |
| Loss | 0–6 | Nov 2014 | ITF Oslo, Norway | W10 | Hard (i) | (Ukraine) Nadiia Kolb | (United States) Alexa Guarachi; Daria Lodikova | 3–6, 6–2, [6–10] |
| Loss | 0–7 | Jun 2015 | ITF Niš, Serbia | W10 | Clay | (Ukraine) Nadiia Kolb | (Argentina) Ailen Crespo Azconzábal (Argentina) Ana Victoria Gobbi Monllau | 1–6, 2–6 |
| Loss | 0–8 | Jul 2015 | ITF Prokuplje, Serbia | W10 | Clay | (Ukraine) Nadiia Kolb | (Spain) Estrella Cabeza Candela (Australia) Alexandra Nancarrow | 6–2, 4–6, [6–10] |
| Loss | 0–9 | Jul 2015 | ITF Iași, Romania | W10 | Clay | (Ukraine) Nadiia Kolb | (Romania) Ioana Loredana Roșca (Romania) Oana Georgeta Simion | 3–6, 5–7 |
| Loss | 0–10 | Aug 2015 | ITF Plovdiv, Bulgaria | W10 | Clay | (Ukraine) Nadiia Kolb | (Australia) Alexandra Nancarrow; Yana Sizikova | 3–6, 3–6 |
| Win | 1–10 | Sep 2015 | ITF Prague, Czech Republic | W10 | Clay | (Ukraine) Nadiia Kolb | (United States) Tina Tehrani (Australia) Karolina Wlodarczak | 6–4, 6–2 |
| Loss | 1–11 | Apr 2016 | ITF Győr, Hungary | W10 | Clay | (Ukraine) Nadiia Kolb | (Romania) Daiana Negreanu (Hungary) Rebeka Stolmár | 6–7^{(4)}, 0–6 |
| Loss | 1–12 | Jun 2016 | ITF Szczawno-Zdrój, Poland | W10 | Clay | (Ukraine) Nadiia Kolb | (Poland) Olga Brózda (Ukraine) Anastasiya Shoshyna | 2–6, 6–7^{(4)} |
| Win | 2–12 | Sep 2016 | ITF Chișinău, Moldova | W10 | Clay | (Ukraine) Nadiia Kolb | (Ukraine) Veronika Kapshay (Ukraine) Angelina Shakhraychuk | 5–7, 7–5, [10–6] |
| Win | 3–12 | Sep 2017 | ITF Kyiv, Ukraine | W15 | Clay | (Ukraine) Nadiia Kolb | (Italy) Martina Colmegna (Italy) Michele Alexandra Zmău | 6–2, 4–6, [13–11] |
| Loss | 3–13 | Nov 2017 | ITF Stockholm, Sweden | W15 | Hard (i) | (Ukraine) Nadiia Kolb | (Norway) Malene Helgø (Sweden) Fanny Östlund | w/o |
| Win | 4–13 | Nov 2017 | ITF Minsk, Belarus | W15 | Hard (i) | (Ukraine) Nadiia Kolb | (France) Manon Arcangioli; Alena Tarasova | 5–7, 6–4, [10–7] |
| Loss | 4–14 | Dec 2017 | ITF Milovice, Czech Republic | W15 | Hard (i) | (Ukraine) Nadiia Kolb | (Slovakia) Jana Jablonovská (Germany) Lena Papadakis | 1–6, 3–6 |
| Win | 5–14 | Sep 2018 | ITF Chornomorsk, Ukraine | W15 | Clay | (Ukraine) Nadiia Kolb | (Moldova) Alexandra Perper (Moldova) Anastasia Vdovenco | 6–4, 6–4 |
| Win | 6–14 | Aug 2022 | ITF Bydgoszcz, Poland | W15 | Clay | (Ukraine) Nadiia Kolb | Valeriia Olianovskaia (Poland) Stefania Rogozińska Dzik | 6–4, 1–6, [10–7] |
| Win | 7–14 | Sep 2022 | ITF Ceuta, Spain | W15 | Hard | (Ukraine) Nadiia Kolb | (Spain) Lucía Llinares Domingo (Spain) Olga Parres Azcoitia | 6–4, 6–2 |
| Loss | 7–15 | Oct 2022 | ITF Baza, Spain | W15 | Hard | (Ukraine) Nadiia Kolb | (Spain) Lucía Llinares Domingo (Spain) Olga Parres Azcoitia | 5–7, 6–2, [11–13] |
| Loss | 7–16 | Oct 2022 | ITF Seville, Spain | W25 | Clay | (Ukraine) Nadiia Kolb | (Turkey) İpek Öz (Slovenia) Nika Radišić | 5–7, 6–7^{(3)} |
| Win | 8–16 | Sep 2022 | ITF Gdańsk, Poland | W15 | Clay | (Ukraine) Nadiia Kolb | (Poland) Gina Feistel (Poland) Marcelina Podlińska | 6–0, 6–1 |
| Loss | 8–17 | Sep 2023 | ITF Frýdek-Místek, Czech Republic | W25 | Clay | (Ukraine) Nadiia Kolb | (Japan) Mana Kawamura (Czech Republic) Linda Klimovičová | 1–6, 3–6 |
| Loss | 8–18 | Sep 2023 | ITF Féminin Le Neubourg, France | W80 | Hard | (Ukraine) Nadiia Kolb | (France) Fiona Ferro; Alina Korneeva | 6–7^{(7)}, 5–7 |
| Loss | 8–19 | Sep 2023 | ITF Santarém, Portugal | W25 | Hard | (Ukraine) Nadiia Kolb | (United States) Dalayna Hewitt (United States) Madison Sieg | 6–4, 2–6, [10–12] |
| Win | 9–19 | Oct 2023 | ITF Seville, Spain | W25 | Clay | (Ukraine) Nadiia Kolb | (Romania) Cristina Dinu (Greece) Sapfo Sakellaridi | 6–1, 6–1 |
| Win | 10–19 | Oct 2023 | ITF Faro, Portugal | W25 | Hard | (Ukraine) Nadiia Kolb | (Latvia) Diāna Marcinkēviča (Greece) Sapfo Sakellaridi | 6–4, 6–3 |
| Loss | 10–20 | Oct 2023 | ITF Castellón, Spain | W15 | Clay | (Ukraine) Nadiia Kolb | (Switzerland) Marie Mettraux (Germany) Chantal Sauvant | 6–3, 1–6, [5–10] |
| Loss | 10–21 | Nov 2023 | ITF Nules, Spain | W15 | Clay | (Ukraine) Nadiia Kolb | (Spain) Yvonne Cavallé Reimers (Spain) Ángela Fita Boluda | 1–6, 2–6 |
| Loss | 10–22 | Aug 2024 | ITF Bytom, Poland | W50 | Clay | (Ukraine) Nadiia Kolb | (Italy) Nicole Fossa Huergo (Kazakhstan) Zhibek Kulambayeva | 6–7^{(6)}, 2–6 |
| Loss | 10–23 | Aug 2024 | ITF Bydgoszcz, Poland | W35 | Clay | (Ukraine) Nadiia Kolb | (Burundi) Sada Nahimana (Japan) Rinon Okuwaki | 4–6, 1–6 |
| Loss | 10–24 | Aug 2024 | ITF Brașov, Romania | W35 | Clay | (Ukraine) Nadiia Kolb | Ksenia Laskutova (Slovakia) Nina Vargová | 3–6, 4–6 |
| Loss | 10–25 | Sep 2024 | Ladies Open Vienna, Austria | W75 | Clay | (Ukraine) Nadiia Kolb | (United Kingdom) Emily Appleton (France) Estelle Cascino | 4–6, 6–7^{(1)} |
