= Dalila Jakupović =

Slovenian tennis player (born 1991)

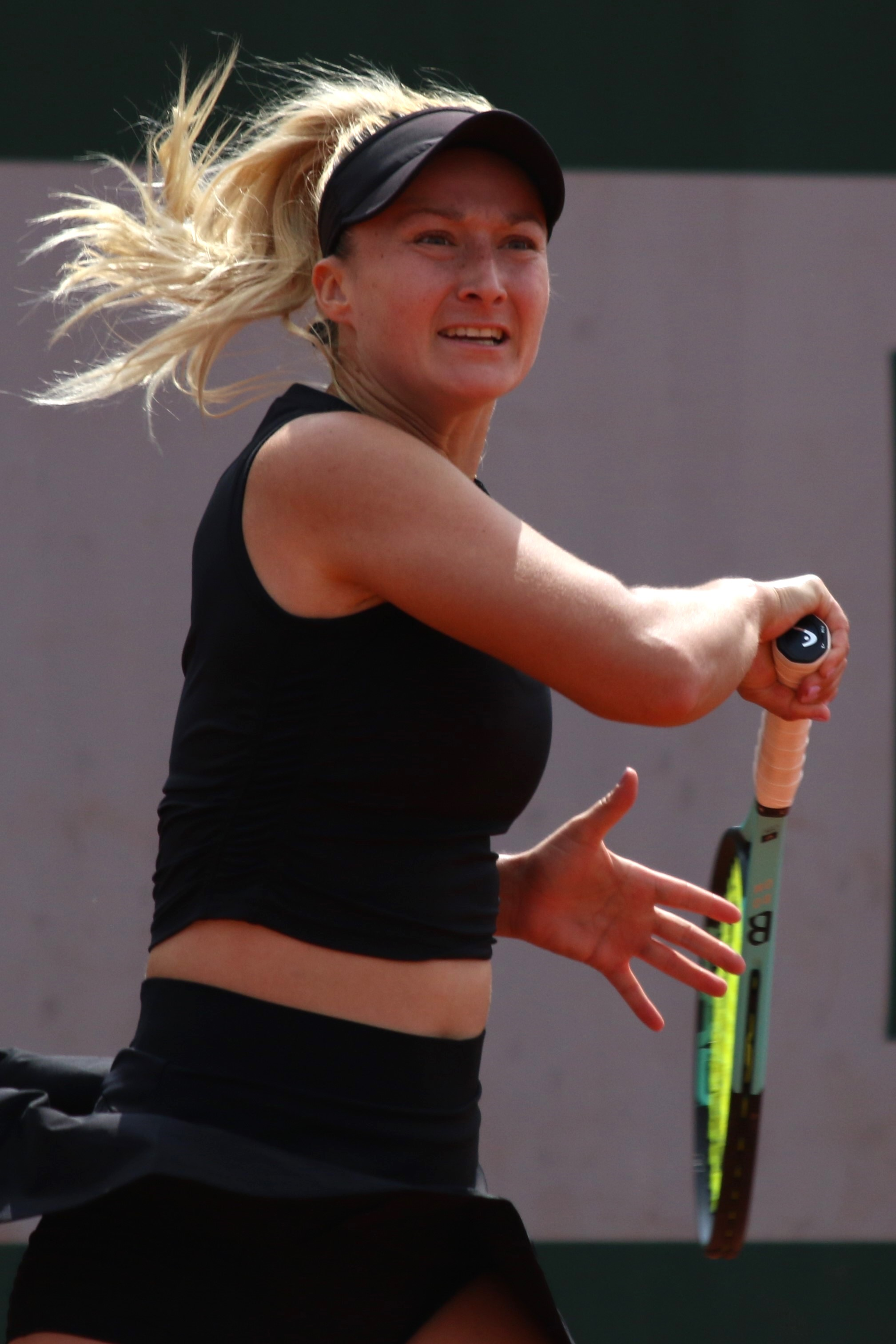
- Jakupović at the 2023 French Open
- Country (sports): Slovenia
- Born: 24 March 1991 (age 35) Jesenice, SFR Yugoslavia
- Height: 1.70 m (5 ft 7 in)
- Coach: Senad Jakupović
- Prize money: US$ 1,420,252

Singles
- Career record: 536–494
- Career titles: 0 WTA, 8 ITF
- Highest ranking: No. 69 (5 November 2018)
- Current ranking: No. 382 (26 October 2026)

Grand Slam singles results
- Australian Open: 1R (2019)
- French Open: 1R (2018, 2019)
- Wimbledon: 1R (2019)
- US Open: 1R (2018)

Doubles
- Career record: 381–297
- Career titles: 3 WTA, 8 WTA 125
- Highest ranking: No. 38 (10 September 2018)
- Current ranking: No. 77 (26 October 2026)

Grand Slam doubles results
- Australian Open: 2R (2018)
- French Open: 3R (2018)
- Wimbledon: 1R (2018)
- US Open: QF (2018)

Team competitions
- Fed Cup: 8–11
- Last updated on: 26 October 2026.

Dalila Jakupović (born 24 March 1991) is a Slovenian tennis player of Bosnian descent.

Jakupović to date has won three doubles titles on the WTA Tour, along with eight on WTA 125 tournaments. She also has won eight singles and 20 doubles titles on the ITF Women's Circuit. In November 2018, she reached a career-high singles ranking of world No. 69. On 10 September 2018, she peaked at No. 38 in the WTA doubles rankings.

Playing for Slovenia, Jakupović has a win-loss record of 8–11 in Billie Jean King Cup competitions (as of October 2026).

== Career ==
In January 2020, Jakupović withdrew while leading her Australian Open qualifier against Stefanie Vögele, collapsing with a coughing fit brought on by smoke from bushfires in the region.

At the 2022 Makarska International Championships, Jakupović claimed the doubles title with Tena Lukas, winning the final against Olga Danilović and Aleksandra Krunić in a deciding champions tiebreak.

Partnering Veronika Erjavec, she won the doubles title at the 2023 Iași Open, defeating Irina Bara and Monica Niculescu in the final.

Alongside Irina Khromacheva, Jakupović claimed the doubles title at the 2023 Parma Open with a wun over Anna Bondár and Kimberley Zimmermann in the final.

Jakupović won the doubles at the 2024 Mumbai Open with Sabrina Santamaria, overcoming Arianne Hartono and Prarthana Thombare in the final.

Partnering with Nika Radišić, she won the doubles title at the 2026 Hamburg Open, defeating top seeds Magali Kempen and Alexandra Panova in the final.

== Performance timeline ==
Key
W	F	SF	QF	#R	RR	Q#	DNQ	A	NH

(W) winner; (F) finalist; (SF) semifinalist; (QF) quarterfinalist; (#R) rounds 4, 3, 2, 1; (RR) round-robin stage; (Q#) qualification round; (DNQ) did not qualify; (A) absent; (NH) not held; (SR) strike rate (events won / competed); (W–L) win–loss record.
To avoid confusion and double counting, these charts are updated at the conclusion of a tournament or when the player's participation has ended.

Only main-draw results in WTA Tour, Grand Slam tournaments, Fed Cup/Billie Jean King Cup and Olympic Games are included in win–loss records.

=== Singles ===
Current through the 2024 WTA Tour.

Tournament	2014	2015	2016	2017	2018	2019	2020	2021	2022	2023	2024	SR	W–L
Grand Slam tournaments
Australian Open	A	A	A	Q1	Q2	1R	Q1	Q1	A	A	A	0 / 1	0–1
French Open	A	A	A	Q1	1R	1R	Q1	A	A	Q1	Q2	0 / 2	0–2
Wimbledon	A	A	A	Q1	Q2	1R	NH	A	A	Q1	Q1	0 / 1	0–1
US Open	A	A	Q1	Q1	1R	Q2	A	A	Q1	A	Q1	0 / 1	0–1
Win–Loss	0–0	0–0	0–0	0–0	0–2	0–3	0–0	0–0	0–0	0–0	0–0	0 / 5	0–5
WTA 1000
Dubai / Qatar Open (Note: The first Premier 5 event of the year has switched back and forth between the Dubai Tennis Championships and the Qatar Ladies Open since 2009. Dubai was classified as a Premier 5 event from 2009 to 2011 before being succeeded by Doha for the 2012–2014 period. In 2015, Dubai regained its Premier 5 status while Doha was demoted to Premier status.)	A	A	A	A	A	2R	A	A	A	A	A	0 / 1	1–1
Indian Wells Open	A	A	A	A	A	Q2	NH	A	A	A	A	0 / 0	0–0
Miami Open	A	A	A	A	A	1R	NH	A	A	A	A	0 / 1	0–1
Canadian Open	A	A	A	A	Q2	A	NH	A	A	A	A	0 / 0	0–0
Cincinnati Open	A	A	A	A	Q1	A	A	A	A	A	A	0 / 0	0–0
Career statistics
Tournaments	1	0	1	2	13	17	0	0	1	0	0	Career total: 35	
Overall win–loss	0–1	0–0	0–1	2–2	12–13	4–17	0–0	0–0	1–1	0–0	0–0	0 / 35	19–35
Year-end ranking (Note: 2008: WTA ranking–990, 2009: WTA ranking–431, 2010: WTA ranking–429, 2011: WTA ranking–340, 2012: WTA ranking–327, 2013: WTA ranking–273.)	425	243	157	239	69	210	243	307	255	229	232	$1,420,252	

== WTA Tour finals ==
=== Doubles: 6 (3 titles, 3 runner-ups) ===
Legend WTA 500 WTA 250 (3–3)	Finals by surface Hard (0–3) Clay (3–0)

Result	W–L	Date	Tournament	Tier	Surface	Partner	Opponents	Score
Loss	0–1	Apr 2017	Monterrey Open, Mexico	International (Note: The WTA International tournaments were reclassified as WTA 250 tournaments in 2021.)	Hard	(Ukraine) Nadiia Kichenok	(Japan) Nao Hibino (Poland) Alicja Rosolska	2–6, 6–7^{(4–7)}
Win	1–1	Apr 2017	İstanbul Cup, Turkey	International	Clay	(Ukraine) Nadiia Kichenok	(United States) Nicole Melichar (Belgium) Elise Mertens	7–6^{(8–6)}, 6–2
Loss	1–2	Oct 2017	Tianjin Open, China	International	Hard	(Serbia) Nina Stojanović	(Romania) Irina-Camelia Begu (Italy) Sara Errani	4–6, 3–6
Win	2–2	Apr 2018	Copa Colsanitas, Colombia	International	Clay	(Russia) Irina Khromacheva	(Colombia) Mariana Duque Mariño (Argentina) Nadia Podoroska	6–3, 6–4
Loss	2–3	Sep 2019	Tashkent Open, Uzbekistan	International	Hard	(United States) Sabrina Santamaria	(United States) Hayley Carter (Brazil) Luisa Stefani	3–6, 6–7^{(4–7)}
Win	3–3	Jul 2026	Hamburg Open, Germany	WTA 250	Clay	(Slovenia) Nika Radišić	(Belgium) Magali Kempen; Alexandra Panova	5-7, 6–3, [10–5]

== WTA 125 finals ==
=== Singles: 1 (runner-up) ===
Result	W–L	Date	Tournament	Surface	Opponent	Score
Loss	0–1	Nov 2017	Mumbai Open, India	Hard	(Belarus) Aryna Sabalenka	2–6, 3–6

=== Doubles: 16 (9 titles, 7 runner-ups) ===
Result	W–L	Date	Tournament	Surface	Partner	Opponents	Score
Loss	0–1	Nov 2017	Hua Hin Challenger, Thailand	Hard	(Russia) Irina Khromacheva	(China) Duan Yingying (China) Wang Yafan	3–6, 3–6
Loss	0–2	Nov 2017	Mumbai Open, India	Hard	(Russia) Irina Khromacheva	(Mexico) Victoria Rodriguez (Netherlands) Bibiane Schoofs	5–7, 6–3, [7–10]
Win	1–2	May 2018	Kunming Open, China	Hard	(Russia) Irina Khromacheva	(China) Guo Hanyu (China) Sun Xuliu	6–1, 6–1
Loss	1–3	Nov 2019	Taipei Challenger, Taiwan	Carpet (i)	(Montenegro) Danka Kovinić	(Chinese Taipei) Lee Ya-hsuan (Chinese Taipei) Wu Fang-hsien	6–4, 4–6, [7–10]
Loss	1–4	Sep 2021	Columbus Challenger, United States	Hard (i)	(Spain) Nuria Párrizas Díaz	(China) Wang Xinyu (China) Zheng Saisai	1–6, 1–6
Win	2–4	Jun 2022	Makarska International, Croatia	Clay	(Croatia) Tena Lukas	(Serbia) Olga Danilović (Serbia) Aleksandra Krunić	5–7, 6–2, [10–5]
Win	3–4	Jul 2023	Iași Open, Romania	Clay	(Slovenia) Veronika Erjavec	(Romania) Irina Bara (Romania) Monica Niculescu	6–4, 6–4
Win	4–4	Sep 2023	Emilia-Romagna Open, Italy	Clay	(Russia) Irina Khromacheva	(Hungary) Anna Bondar (Belgium) Kimberley Zimmermann	6–2, 6–3
Win	5–4	Feb 2024	Mumbai Open, India	Hard	(United States) Sabrina Santamaria	(Netherlands) Arianne Hartono (India) Prarthana Thombare	6–4, 6–3
Loss	5–5	Sep 2025	Ljubljana Open, Slovenia	Clay	(Slovenia) Nika Radišić	(Czech Republic) Miriam Škoch (Switzerland) Simona Waltert	2–6, 2–6
Win	6–5	Jun 2026	Internazionali di Brescia, Italy	Clay	(Slovenia) Nika Radišić	(Romania) Irina Bara (Switzerland) Naïma Karamoko	6–4, 7–5
Win	7–5	Sep 2026	Internacional de Valencia, Spain	Clay	(Switzerland) Naïma Karamoko	(Spain) Irene Burillo (Argentina) Nicole Fossa Huergo	6–2, 6–3
Loss	7–6	Sep 2026	Ankara Open, Turkey	Hard	(Switzerland) Naïma Karamoko	(Poland) Weronika Falkowska (United States) Alana Smith	2–6, 6–7^{(2–7)}
Loss	7–7	Sep 2026	Adana Open, Turkey	Hard	(Belgium) Lara Salden	(Italy) Angelica Moratelli (Czech Republic) Vendula Valdmannová	6–7^{(3–7)}, 4–6
Win	8–7	Oct 2026	Lisboa Belém Open, Portugal	Clay	(Slovenia) Nika Radišić	(Poland) Gina Feistel (Cyprus) Raluca Șerban	6–3, 6–1
Win	9–7	Oct 2026	Curitiba Open, Brazil	Clay	(Slovenia) Nika Radišić	(Brazil) Nauhany Vitória Leme da Silva (Brazil) Laura Pigossi	6–4, 6–2

== ITF Circuit finals ==
=== Singles: 22 (8 titles, 14 runner-ups) ===
Legend W60 tournaments (1–0) W50 tournaments (0–1) W25/35 tournaments (6–10) W10 tournaments (1–3)	Finals by surface Hard (1–5) Clay (7–9)

Result	W–L	Date	Tournament	Tier	Surface	Opponent	Score
Loss	0–1	Sep 2009	ITF Bangalore, India	W10	Hard	(India) Poojashree Venkatesha	3–6, 3–6
Loss	0–2	Jan 2011	ITF Kolkata, India	W10	Clay	(Japan) Mari Tanaka	4–6, 3–6
Win	1–2	Mar 2012	ITF Aurangabad, India	W10	Clay	(Thailand) Peangtarn Plipuech	6–4, 7–5
Loss	1–3	Apr 2012	ITF Antalya, Turkey	W10	Hard	(Russia) Elizaveta Kulichkova	5–7, 2–6
Loss	1–4	Jul 2013	Schönbusch Open, Germany	W25	Clay	(Slovenia) Maša Zec Peškirič	4–6, 4–6
Loss	1–5	Oct 2013	Lagos Open, Nigeria	W25	Hard	(Slovenia) Tadeja Majerič	5–7, 5–7
Win	2–5	Feb 2015	ITF Aurangabad, India	W25	Clay	(China) Han Xinyun	6–7^{(5)}, 6–4, 6–4
Loss	2–6	Jul 2015	ITF Darmstadt, Germany	W25	Clay	(Belgium) Ysaline Bonaventure	3–6, 6–7^{(4)}
Loss	2–7	May 2016	ITF Caserta, Italy	W25	Clay	(Bulgaria) Isabella Shinikova	2–6, 6–4, 2–6
Loss	2–8	Jun 2016	ITF Lenzerheide, Switzerland	W25	Clay	(Germany) Tamara Korpatsch	6–4, 4–6, 2–6
Loss	2–9	Jun 2016	ITF Stuttgart, Germany	W25	Clay	(North Macedonia) Lina Gjorcheska	2–6, 6–3, 4–6
Win	3–9	Jul 2016	ITF Turin, Italy	W25	Clay	(North Macedonia) Lina Gjorcheska	7–5, 6–4
Loss	3–10	Jul 2016	Schönbusch Open, Germany	W25	Clay	(Russia) Anna Kalinskaya	3–6, 6–2, 2–6
Win	4–10	Aug 2016	Ladies Open Hechingen, Germany	W25	Clay	(Netherlands) Cindy Burger	6–3, 4–6, 7–6^{(5)}
Win	5–10	Mar 2018	Clay Court International, Australia	W60	Clay	(Australia) Destanee Aiava	6–4, 6–4
Loss	5–11	May 2021	ITF Otočec, Slovenia	W25	Clay	(Czech Republic) Miriam Kolodziejová	0–6, 2–6
Loss	5–12	Oct 2021	ITF Redding, United States	W25	Hard	(United States) Catherine Harrison	1–6, 1–6
Win	6–12	Aug 2023	ITF Bydgoszcz, Poland	W25	Clay	(Slovenia) Nika Radišić	6–2, 6–1
Loss	6–13	Jan 2024	ITF Indore, India	W50	Hard	(Russia) Polina Kudermetova	6–3, 2–6, 0–6
Win	7–13	Mar 2024	ITF Nagpur, India	W35	Clay	(South Korea) Ku Yeon-woo	6–1, 6–2
Win	8–13	Mar 2024	ITF Indore, India	W35	Hard	(India) Shrivalli Bhamidipaty	6–3, 6–2
Loss	8–14	Aug 2026	ITF Kraków, Poland	W35	Clay	(Spain) Ariana Geerlings	4–6, 3–6

=== Doubles: 42 (20 titles, 22 runner-ups) ===
Legend W100 tournaments (0–1) W60/75 tournaments (8–5) W40 tournaments (2–0) W25/35 tournaments (7–8) W10 tournaments (3–8)	Finals by surface Hard (3–8) Clay (16–12) Grass (0–1) Carpet (1–1)

Result	W–L	Date	Tournament	Tier	Surface	Partner	Opponents	Score
Loss	0–1	Aug 2008	ITF Pörtschach, Austria	10,000	Clay	(Ukraine) Sofiya Kovalets	(Austria) Barbara Hellwig (Austria) Sandra Klemenschits	6–2, 2–6, [7–10]
Win	1–1	Jun 2009	ITF Melilla, Spain	10,000	Hard	(Slovakia) Zuzana Zlochová	(Switzerland) Lucia Kovarčíková (Belgium) Davinia Lobbinger	6–2, 6–4
Loss	1–2	Jul 2009	ITF Felixstowe, United Kingdom	10,000	Grass	(Germany) Sarah-Rebecca Sekulic	(United Kingdom) Jocelyn Rae (United Kingdom) Jade Windley	1–6, 0–6
Loss	1–3	Aug 2009	ITF New Delhi, India	10,000	Hard	(India) Ashmitha Easwaramurthi	(Uzbekistan) Alexandra Kolesnichenko (United Kingdom) Emily Webley-Smith	2–6, 4–6
Loss	1–4	Aug 2010	ITF Pörtschach, Austria	10,000	Clay	(Italy) Vivienne Vierin	(Italy) Evelyn Mayr (Italy) Julia Mayr	4–6, 1–6
Loss	1–5	Oct 2010	ITF Ain Sukhna, Egypt	10,000	Clay	(Italy) Valentine Confalonieri	(Czech Republic) Iveta Gerlová (Czech Republic) Lucie Kriegsmannová	1–6, 4–6
Win	2–5	Jan 2011	ITF Kolkata, India	10,000	Clay	(Italy) Nicole Clerico	(India) Ankita Raina (India) Poojashree Venkatesha	6–3, 6–1
Loss	2–6	Mar 2011	ITF Fällanden, Switzerland	10,000	Carpet (i)	(Slovenia) Anja Prislan	(Switzerland) Xenia Knoll (Switzerland) Amra Sadiković	3–6, 3–6
Loss	2–7	Nov 2011	ITF Antalya, Turkey	10,000	Clay	(Germany) Sarah-Rebecca Sekulic	(Romania) Diana Enache (Netherlands) Daniëlle Harmsen	1–6, 3–6
Win	3–7	Mar 2012	ITF Aurangabad, India	10,000	Clay	(Germany) Sarah-Rebecca Sekulic	(Thailand) Peangtarn Plipuech (Thailand) Varunya Wongteanchai	6–1, 6–3
Loss	3–8	Jun 2013	ITF Sharm El Sheikh, Egypt	10,000	Hard	(India) Kyra Shroff	(India) Sowjanya Bavisetti (Russia) Anna Morgina	1–6, 6–3, [6–10]
Loss	3–9	Sep 2013	Trabzon Cup, Turkey	50,000	Hard	(Armenia) Ani Amiraghyan	(Georgia (country)) Oksana Kalashnikova (Serbia) Aleksandra Krunić	2–6, 1–6
Loss	3–10	Jun 2014	ITF Budapest, Hungary	25,000	Clay	(Czech Republic) Kateřina Kramperová	(Hungary) Réka Luca Jani (Russia) Irina Khromacheva	5–7, 4–6
Win	4–10	Nov 2015	ITF Bratislava, Slovakia	25,000	Hard (i)	(Germany) Anne Schäfer	(Slovakia) Michaela Hončová (Slovakia) Chantal Škamlová	6–7^{(5)}, 6–2, [10–8]
Win	5–10	Dec 2015	ITF Cairo, Egypt	25,000	Clay	(Russia) Valentyna Ivakhnenko	(Italy) Martina Caregaro (Hungary) Réka Luca Jani	w/o
Win	6–10	Jul 2016	ITF Turin, Italy	25,000	Clay	(North Macedonia) Lina Gjorcheska	(Italy) Alice Matteucci (Georgia (country)) Sofia Shapatava	6–3, 6–3
Loss	6–11	Jul 2016	ITF Aschaffenburg, Germany	25,000	Clay	(China) Lu Jiajing	(Germany) Nicola Geuer (Germany) Anna Zaja	4–6, 4–6
Loss	6–12	Jul 2016	ITF Darmstadt, Germany	25,000	Clay	(Bosnia and Herzegovina) Anita Husarić	(Greece) Valentini Grammatikopoulou (Russia) Anna Kalinskaya	4–6, 1–6
Loss	6–13	Jun 2017	Open de Marseille, France	100,000	Clay	(Hungary) Dalma Gálfi	(Russia) Natela Dzalamidze (Russia) Veronika Kudermetova	6–7^{(5)}, 4–6
Win	7–13	Jan 2018	Playford International, Australia	25,000	Hard	(Russia) Irina Khromacheva	(Japan) Junri Namigata (Japan) Erika Sema	2–6, 7–5, [10–5]
Win	8–13	Mar 2018	Clay Court International, Australia	60,000	Clay	(Australia) Priscilla Hon	(Japan) Makoto Ninomiya (Japan) Miyu Kato	6–4, 4–6, [10–7]
Loss	8–14	Oct 2021	ITF Redding, United States	W25	Hard	(China) Lu Jiajing	(Sweden) Mirjam Björklund (United Kingdom) Katie Swan	3–6, 6–1, [3–10]
Win	9–14	May 2022	Grado Tennis Cup, Italy	W60	Clay	Alena Fomina-Klotz	(Hong Kong) Eudice Chong (Chinese Taipei) Liang En-shuo	6–1, 6–4
Win	10–14	Jul 2022	Liepāja Open, Latvia	W60	Clay	(Serbia) Ivana Jorović	(United Kingdom) Emily Appleton (India) Prarthana Thombare	6–4, 6–3
Loss	10–15	Nov 2022	ITF Haabneeme, Estonia	W25	Hard	(Netherlands) Arantxa Rus	(Norway) Malene Helgø (Netherlands) Suzan Lamens	2–6, 1–6
Loss	10–16	Mar 2023	Clay Court International, Australia	W60	Hard	(Australia) Priscilla Hon	(Australia) Elysia Bolton (Australia) Alexandra Bozovic	6–4, 5–7, [11–13]
Win	11–16	Apr 2023	ITF Istanbul, Turkey	W60	Clay	Irina Khromacheva	(Ukraine) Valeriya Strakhova (Australia) Priscilla Hon	7–6^{(3)}, 6–4
Win	12–16	May 2023	Zagreb Ladies Open, Croatia	W60	Clay	(Greece) Valentini Grammatikopoulou	(France) Carole Monnet (Croatia) Antonia Ružić	6–2, 7–5
Win	13–16	Aug 2023	ITF Wroclaw, Poland	W40	Clay	(Georgia (country)) Ekaterine Gorgodze	(Poland) Weronika Ewald (Poland) Daria Kuczer	6–4, 4–6, [10–7]
Win	14–16	Aug 2023	ITF Bydgoszcz, Poland	W25	Clay	(Slovenia) Nika Radišić	(Poland) Zuzanna Pawlikowska (Poland) Malwina Rowińska	6–4, 6–2
Loss	14–17	Oct 2023	ITF Istanbul, Turkey	W25	Hard (i)	(Bosnia and Herzegovina) Anita Wagner	(Russia) Ekaterina Yashina (Russia) Anastasia Zakharova	3–6, 4–6
Win	15–17	Oct 2023	ITF Heraklion, Greece	W40	Clay	(Romania) Irina Bara	(Romania) Oana Gavrilă (Greece) Sapfo Sakellaridi	3–6, 7–6^{(6)}, [10–8]
Win	16–17	Mar 2024	ITF Nagpur, India	W35	Clay	(Romania) Irina Bara	(South Korea) Ku Yeon-woo (Lithuania) Justina Mikulskytė	6–7^{(8)}, 7–6^{(5)}, [10–7]
Loss	16–18	May 2024	Empire Slovak Open, Slovakia	W75	Clay	(United States) Sabrina Santamaria	(Slovenia) Veronika Erjavec (Slovenia) Tamara Zidanšek	4–6, 4–6
Loss	16–19	Oct 2024	ITF Kayseri, Turkey	W35	Hard	(India) Ankita Raina	(United States) Isabella Barrera (United States) Abigail Rencheli	3–6, 6–2, [6–10]
Win	17–19	Feb 2025	AK Ladies Open, Germany	W75	Carpet (i)	(Belgium) Marie Benoît	(United Kingdom) Emily Appleton (Netherlands) Isabelle Haverlag	7–5, 7–6^{(6)}
Win	18–19	May 2025	ITF Warmbad Villach, Austria	W35	Clay	(Slovenia) Nika Radišić	(Netherlands) Jasmijn Gimbrère (United States) Rasheeda McAdoo	6–4, 6–4
Loss	18–20	Jun 2025	ITF Tarvisio, Italy	W35	Clay	(Slovenia) Nika Radišić	(Czech Republic) Aneta Kučmová (Poland) Daria Kuczer	6–2, 1–6, [11–13]
Win	19–20	Jul 2025	ITS Cup, Czech Republic	W75	Clay	(Slovenia) Nika Radišić	(India) Rutuja Bhosale (China) Zheng Wushuang	6–4, 6–1
Loss	19–21	Aug 2025	Ladies Open Amstetten, Austria	W75	Clay	(Slovenia) Nika Radišić	(China) Feng Shuo (Chinese Taipei) Liang En-shuo	6–4, 4–6, [0–10]
Loss	19–22	Sep 2025	Ladies Open Vienna, Austria	W75	Clay	(United Kingdom) Madeleine Brooks	(Poland) Gina Feistel (Poland) Marcelina Podlińska	6–2, 6–7^{(3)}, [8–10]
Win	20–22	Jul 2026	Ladies Open Hechingen, Germany	W75	Clay	(Italy) Enola Chiesa	(Greece) Sapfo Sakellaridi (Italy) Aurora Zantedeschi	6–3, 2–6, [12–10]

== Team competition ==
=== Fed Cup/Billie Jean King Cup participation ===
==== Singles (6–5) ====
Edition	Stage	Date	Location	Against	Surface	Opponent	W/L	Score
2014	Z1 R/R	Feb 2014	Budapest (HUN)	Ukraine	Hard (i)	Lyudmyla Kichenok	L	6–4, 4–6, 1–6
2014	Z1 R/R	Feb 2014	Budapest (HUN)	Israel	Hard (i)	Julia Glushko	W	6–3, 2–6, 6–2
2014	Z1 P/O	Feb 2014	Budapest (HUN)	Latvia	Hard (i)	Jeļena Ostapenko	L	3–6, 6–7^{(9–11)}
2017	Z2 R/R	Apr 2017	Šiauliai (LTU)	Sweden	Hard (i)	Cornelia Lister	W	6–2, 4–6, 6–3
2017	Z2 R/R	Apr 2017	Šiauliai (LTU)	South Africa	Hard (i)	Ilze Hattingh	W	6–1, 6–3
2017	Z2 R/R	Apr 2017	Šiauliai (LTU)	Norway	Hard (i)	Ulrikke Eikeri	W	6–1, 6–2
2017	Z2 P/O	Apr 2017	Šiauliai (LTU)	Luxembourg	Hard (i)	Claudine Schaul	W	6–1, 7–6^{(7–5)}

==== Doubles (2–4) ====
Edition	Stage	Date	Location	Against	Surface	Partner	Opponents	W/L	Score
2014	Z1 R/R	Feb 2014	Budapest	Ukraine	Hard (i)	Andreja Klepač	Lyudmyla Kichenok; Olga Savchuk	L	2–6, 3–6
2014	Z1 R/R	Feb 2014	Budapest	Israel	Hard (i)	Andreja Klepač	Julia Glushko; Shahar Pe'er	L	4–6, 5–7
2017	Z2 R/R	Apr 2017	Šiauliai	South Africa	Hard (i)	Andreja Klepač	Ilze Hattingh; Madrie Le Roux	W	6–2, 4–6, 6–0
2017	Z2 R/R	Apr 2017	Šiauliai	Norway	Hard (i)	Andreja Klepač	Malene Helgø; Caroline Rohde-Moe	L	0–1 ret.
