= 2021 Budapest Grand Prix – Singles =

Singles
- 2021 Budapest Grand Prix

Final
- Champion: (Kazakhstan) Yulia Putintseva
- Runner-up: (Ukraine) Anhelina Kalinina
- Score: 6–4, 6–0

Details
- Draw: 32
- Seeds: 8

Events
Singles	Doubles
← 2013 ·	Budapest Grand Prix	· 2022 →

Simona Halep was the defending champion, having won the previous edition in 2013, but chose not to participate.

Yulia Putintseva won the title, defeating Anhelina Kalinina in the final, 6–4, 6–0.

== Seeds ==
1. (Kazakhstan) Yulia Putintseva (champion)
2. (United States) Danielle Collins (semifinals, retired)
3. (United States) Bernarda Pera (second round)
4. (Romania) Irina-Camelia Begu (first round)
5. (Romania) Ana Bogdan (second round)
6. (Belarus) Aliaksandra Sasnovich (second round)
7. (Bulgaria) Viktoriya Tomova (first round)
8. (Italy) Sara Errani (first round)

== Draw ==
=== Key ===
- Q = Qualifier
- WC = Wild card
- LL = Lucky loser
- Alt = Alternate
- SE = Special exempt
- PR = Protected ranking
- ITF = ITF entry
- JE = Junior exempt
- w/o = Walkover
- r = Retired
- d = Defaulted
- SR = Special ranking

=== Finals ===
Semifinals
1	(Kazakhstan) Yulia Putintseva	6	3	6
WC	(Hungary) Dalma Gálfi	2	6	2
(Ukraine) Anhelina Kalinina	7^{7}	4
2	(United States) Danielle Collins	6^{5}	1^{r}

Final
1	(Kazakhstan) Yulia Putintseva	6	6
(Ukraine) Anhelina Kalinina	4	0

=== Top half ===
First round
1	(Kazakhstan) Y Putintseva	6	6
Q	(Georgia (country)) E Gorgodze	2	4
(Croatia) A Konjuh	4	6	6
Q	(Croatia) T Mrdeža	6	3	2
PR	(Ukraine) K Kozlova	7^{11}	6
(Austria) B Haas	6^{9}	3
(United States) V Lepchenko	4	5
5	(Romania) A Bogdan	6	7
4	(Romania) I-C Begu	3	4
PR	(Slovakia) AK Schmiedlová	6	6
(Spain) A Bolsova	6^{4}	3
WC	(Hungary) D Gálfi	7^{7}	6
(Germany) T Korpatsch	2	2
Q	(Serbia) O Danilović	6	6
(Romania) I Bara	4	7	6
8	(Italy) S Errani	6	5	2

Second round
1	(Kazakhstan) Y Putintseva	6	6
(Croatia) A Konjuh	4	3
PR	(Ukraine) K Kozlova	4	6	6
5	(Romania) A Bogdan	6	4	2
PR	(Slovakia) AK Schmiedlová	2	5
WC	(Hungary) D Gálfi	6	7
Q	(Serbia) O Danilović	6	6
(Romania) I Bara	4	3

Quarterfinals
1	(Kazakhstan) Y Putintseva	6^{4}	6	7
PR	(Ukraine) K Kozlova	7^{7}	0	5
WC	(Hungary) D Gálfi	6	6
Q	(Serbia) O Danilović	4	2

Semifinals
1	(Kazakhstan) Y Putintseva	6	3	6
WC	(Hungary) D Gálfi	2	6	2

=== Bottom half ===
First round
6	(Belarus) A Sasnovich	6	2
(Hungary) T Babos	0	0^{r}
(Egypt) M Sherif	3	1
WC	(Hungary) P Udvardy	6	6
(Ukraine) A Kalinina	6	7^{7}
(Russia) A Kalinskaya	4	6^{5}
Q	(Austria) J Grabher	7	1	2
3	(United States) B Pera	5	6	6
7	(Bulgaria) V Tomova	2	3
Q	(Argentina) P Ormaechea	6	6
PR	(Serbia) I Jorović	5	7^{8}	7^{7}
Q	(Romania) J Cristian	7	6^{6}	6^{3}
(Italy) E Cocciaretto	4	5
WC	(Hungary) RL Jani	6	7
LL	(Italy) M Di Giuseppe	2	1
2	(United States) D Collins	6	6

Second round
6	(Belarus) A Sasnovich	6^{4}	2
WC	(Hungary) P Udvardy	7^{7}	6
(Ukraine) A Kalinina	7	6
3	(United States) B Pera	5	3
Q	(Argentina) P Ormaechea	6	7^{8}
PR	(Serbia) I Jorović	1	6^{6}
WC	(Hungary) RL Jani	5	0
2	(United States) D Collins	7	6

Quarterfinals
WC	(Hungary) P Udvardy	4	4
(Ukraine) A Kalinina	6	6
Q	(Argentina) P Ormaechea	1	4
2	(United States) D Collins	6	6

Semifinals
(Ukraine) A Kalinina	7^{7}	4
2	(United States) D Collins	6^{5}	1^{r}

== Qualifying ==
=== Seeds ===
1. (Romania) Jaqueline Cristian (qualified)
2. (Serbia) Olga Danilović (qualified)
3. (Spain) Cristina Bucșa (qualifying competition)
4. (Spain) Lara Arruabarrena (first round)
5. (United States) Katie Volynets (first round)
6. (Austria) Julia Grabher (qualified)
7. (Croatia) Tereza Mrdeža (qualified)
8. (Italy) Martina Di Giuseppe (qualifying competition; lucky loser)
9. (Georgia (country)) Ekaterine Gorgodze (qualified)
10. (United States) Jamie Loeb (qualifying competition)
11. (Germany) Katharina Gerlach (first round)
12. (Ukraine) Kateryna Bondarenko (first round)

=== Qualifiers ===
1. (Romania) Jaqueline Cristian
2. (Serbia) Olga Danilović
3. (Croatia) Tereza Mrdeža
4. (Argentina) Paula Ormaechea
5. (Georgia (country)) Ekaterine Gorgodze
6. (Austria) Julia Grabher

=== Lucky loser ===
1. (Italy) Martina Di Giuseppe

=== Draw ===
==== First qualifier ====
First round
1	(Romania) Jaqueline Cristian	1	6	6
WC	(Hungary) Fanny Stollár	6	1	2
(Brazil) Carolina Alves	4	7	4
8	(Italy) Martina Di Giuseppe	6	5	6

Qualifying competition
1	(Romania) Jaqueline Cristian	6	4	7^{7}
8	(Italy) Martina Di Giuseppe	1	6	6^{3}

==== Second qualifier ====
First round
2	(Serbia) Olga Danilović	6	6
(Spain) Irene Burillo Escorihuela	4	3
Alt	(Romania) Miriam Bulgaru	6	4	6
11	(Germany) Katharina Gerlach	3	6	2

Qualifying competition
2	(Serbia) Olga Danilović	6	3	6
Alt	(Romania) Miriam Bulgaru	3	6	3

==== Third qualifier ====
First round
3	(Spain) Cristina Bucșa	6	5	6
WC	(Hungary) Dorka Drahota-Szabó	3	7	0
WC	(Hungary) Natália Szabanin	4	2
7	(Croatia) Tereza Mrdeža	6	6

Qualifying competition
3	(Spain) Cristina Bucșa	4	6^{2}
7	(Croatia) Tereza Mrdeža	6	7^{7}

==== Fourth qualifier ====
First round
4	(Spain) Lara Arruabarrena	2	2
(United States) Victoria Duval	6	6
(Argentina) Paula Ormaechea	6	6
12	(Ukraine) Kateryna Bondarenko	2	3

Qualifying competition
(United States) Victoria Duval	6^{3}	2
(Argentina) Paula Ormaechea	7^{7}	6

==== Fifth qualifier ====
First round
5	(United States) Katie Volynets	6^{5}	6	3
(Spain) Andrea Lázaro García	7^{7}	1	6
(Hungary) Anna Bondár	6^{3}	6	3
9	(Georgia (country)) Ekaterine Gorgodze	7^{7}	4	6

Qualifying competition
(Spain) Andrea Lázaro García	6	3	2
9	(Georgia (country)) Ekaterine Gorgodze	3	6	6

==== Sixth qualifier ====
First round
6	(Austria) Julia Grabher	6	6
WC	(Hungary) Amarissa Kiara Tóth	3	4
(Slovakia) Zuzana Zlochová	5	3
10	(United States) Jamie Loeb	7	6

Qualifying competition
6	(Austria) Julia Grabher	6	6
10	(United States) Jamie Loeb	0	3
