= 2021 Budapest Grand Prix – Doubles =

Doubles
- 2021 Budapest Grand Prix

Final
- Champions: (Romania) Mihaela Buzărnescu (Hungary) Fanny Stollár
- Runners-up: (Spain) Aliona Bolsova (Germany) Tamara Korpatsch
- Score: 6–4, 6–4

Details
- Draw: 16
- Seeds: 4

Events
Singles	Doubles
← 2013 ·	Budapest Grand Prix	· 2022 →

Andrea Sestini Hlaváčková and Lucie Hradecká were the defending champions having won the previous edition in 2013, but Hradecká chose to compete at the 2021 Prague Open instead, whilst Sestini Hlaváčková retired from professional tennis in 2019.

Mihaela Buzărnescu and Fanny Stollár won the title, defeating Aliona Bolsova and Tamara Korpatsch in the final, 6–4, 6–4.

== Seeds ==
1. (Russia) Anna Kalinskaya / (Russia) Yana Sizikova (quarterfinals)
2. (Hungary) Tímea Babos / (Hungary) Réka Luca Jani (quarterfinals, withdrew)
3. (Kazakhstan) Anna Danilina / (Belarus) Lidziya Marozava (first round)
4. (Egypt) Mayar Sherif / (Czech Republic) Renata Voráčová (first round)

== Draw ==
=== Key ===
- Q = Qualifier
- WC = Wild card
- LL = Lucky loser
- Alt = Alternate
- SE = Special exempt
- PR = Protected ranking
- ITF = ITF entry
- JE = Junior exempt
- w/o = Walkover
- r = Retired
- d = Defaulted
- SR = Special ranking

=== Draw ===
First round
1	(Russia) A Kalinskaya (Russia) Y Sizikova	6	6
(Japan) M Kato (United States) V Lepchenko	3	4
(Georgia (country)) E Gorgodze (Slovakia) T Mihalíková	6	1	[13]
(Romania) I Bara (Italy) S Errani	4	6	[15]
4	(Egypt) M Sherif (Czech Republic) R Voráčová	2	5
(Hungary) A Bondár (Hungary) D Gálfi	6	7
(United States) J Loeb (Hungary) P Udvardy	4	3
(Romania) M Buzărnescu (Hungary) F Stollár	6	6
WC	(Hungary) N Szabanin (Hungary) AK Tóth	4	5
(Russia) A Anshba (Czech Republic) A Dețiuc	6	7
(Serbia) O Danilović (Serbia) I Jorović	6	6
3	(Kazakhstan) A Danilina (Belarus) L Marozava	3	2
(Spain) A Bolsova (Germany) T Korpatsch	6	5	[10]
(Romania) J Cristian (Georgia (country)) O Kalashnikova	4	7	[5]
WC	(Hungary) D Drahota-Szabó (Hungary) L Udvardy	1	2
2	(Hungary) T Babos (Hungary) RL Jani	6	6

Quarterfinals
1	(Russia) A Kalinskaya (Russia) Y Sizikova	6^{5}	4
(Romania) I Bara (Italy) S Errani	7^{7}	6
(Hungary) A Bondár (Hungary) D Gálfi	2	5
(Romania) M Buzărnescu (Hungary) F Stollár	6	7
(Russia) A Anshba (Czech Republic) A Dețiuc	w/o
(Serbia) O Danilović (Serbia) I Jorović
(Spain) A Bolsova (Germany) T Korpatsch	w/o
2	(Hungary) T Babos (Hungary) RL Jani

Semifinals
(Romania) I Bara (Italy) S Errani
(Romania) M Buzărnescu (Hungary) F Stollár	w/o
(Russia) A Anshba (Czech Republic) A Dețiuc	6	4	[8]
(Spain) A Bolsova (Germany) T Korpatsch	3	6	[10]

Final
(Romania) M Buzărnescu (Hungary) F Stollár	6	6
(Spain) A Bolsova (Germany) T Korpatsch	4	4
