= 2023 Budapest Grand Prix – Singles =

Singles
- 2023 Budapest Grand Prix

Final
- Champion: Maria Timofeeva
- Runner-up: (Ukraine) Kateryna Baindl
- Score: 6–3, 3–6, 6–0

Details
- Draw: 32
- Seeds: 8

Events
| Singles | Doubles |
| ← 2022 · | Budapest Grand Prix | · 2024 → |

Maria Timofeeva defeated Kateryna Baindl in the final, 6–3, 3–6, 6–0 to win the singles tennis title at the 2023 Budapest Grand Prix. Timofeeva won the title both as a lucky loser and in her first main-draw appearance on the WTA Tour. She thus became the first lucky loser to win a WTA Tour singles title since Coco Gauff in 2019 (and only the fourth player overall), and the first player to win a title on her tour debut since Angelique Widjaja in 2001.

Bernarda Pera was the defending champion, but lost in the first round to Diana Shnaider.

== Seeds ==
1. (United States) Bernarda Pera (first round)
2. (China) Zhang Shuai (first round, retired)
3. (Italy) Camila Giorgi (withdrew)
4. (Kazakhstan) Yulia Putintseva (second round)
5. (Germany) Tatjana Maria (second round)
6. Elina Avanesyan (quarterfinals)
7. Kamilla Rakhimova (first round)
8. (Slovakia) Anna Karolína Schmiedlová (quarterfinals)
9. (Argentina) Nadia Podoroska (semifinals)

== Draw ==
=== Key ===
- Q = Qualifier
- WC = Wild card
- LL = Lucky loser
- Alt = Alternate
- SE = Special exempt
- PR = Protected ranking
- ITF = ITF entry
- JE = Junior exempt
- w/o = Walkover
- r = Retired
- d = Defaulted
- SR = Special ranking

=== Finals ===
Semifinals
LL | Maria Timofeeva | 7^{8} | 3 | 6
9 | (Argentina) Nadia Podoroska | 6^{6} | 6 | 3
(United States) Claire Liu | 5 | 6^{3}
(Ukraine) Kateryna Baindl | 7 | 7^{7}

Final
LL | Maria Timofeeva | 6 | 3 | 6
(Ukraine) Kateryna Baindl | 3 | 6 | 0

=== Top half ===
First round
1 | (United States) B Pera | 4 | 5
D Shnaider | 6 | 7
(Australia) D Saville | 6 | 3 | 4
LL | M Timofeeva | 2 | 6 | 6
PR | (Slovakia) K Kučová | 5 | 2
Q | (Slovenia) K Juvan | 7 | 6
Q | (Australia) A Sharma | 6 | 6
7 | K Rakhimova | 3 | 3
9 | (Argentina) N Podoroska | 1 | 6 | 6
(Australia) S Hunter | 6 | 1 | 1
PR | E Rodina | 3 | 0
Q | (Czech Republic) A Sisková | 6 | 6
(Hungary) T Babos | 5 | 7 | 3
(Hungary) A Bondár | 7 | 5 | 6
(Slovakia) R Šramková | 6 | 4 | 3
6 | E Avanesyan | 2 | 6 | 6

Second round
D Shnaider | 1 | 1
LL | M Timofeeva | 6 | 6
Q | (Slovenia) K Juvan | 6 | 4 | 6
Q | (Australia) A Sharma | 2 | 6 | 2
9 | (Argentina) N Podoroska | 6 | 6
Q | (Czech Republic) A Sisková | 3 | 0
(Hungary) A Bondár | 3 | 0
6 | E Avanesyan | 6 | 6

Quarterfinals
LL | M Timofeeva | 3 | 6 | 6
Q | (Slovenia) K Juvan | 6 | 3 | 2
9 | (Argentina) N Podoroska | 6 | 6
6 | E Avanesyan | 1 | 3

Semifinals
LL | M Timofeeva | 7^{8} | 3 | 6
9 | (Argentina) N Podoroska | 6^{6} | 6 | 3

=== Bottom half ===
First round
8 | (Slovakia) AK Schmiedlová | 6 | 6
P Kudermetova | 2 | 0
LL | (Greece) V Grammatikopoulou | 4 | 4
(Germany) T Korpatsch | 6 | 6
Q | (United States) L Chirico | 4 | 4
(United States) C Liu | 6 | 6
Q | (Ukraine) K Volodko | 6 | 2 | 1
4 | (Kazakhstan) Y Putintseva | 1 | 6 | 6
5 | (Germany) T Maria | 3 | 7^{7} | 6
(France) C Monnet | 6 | 6^{5} | 2
WC | (Hungary) F Stollár | 7 | 6
Q | (Spain) I Burillo Escorihuela | 5 | 4
WC | (Hungary) N Szabanin | 4 | 5
(Ukraine) K Baindl | 6 | 7
WC | (Hungary) A Tóth | 6
2 | (China) S Zhang | 5^{r}

Second round
8 | (Slovakia) AK Schmiedlová | 4 | 6 | 6
(Germany) T Korpatsch | 6 | 2 | 3
(United States) C Liu | 6 | 7^{10}
4 | (Kazakhstan) Y Putintseva | 3 | 6^{8}
5 | (Germany) T Maria | 3 | 6 | 6^{6}
WC | (Hungary) F Stollár | 6 | 2 | 7^{8}
(Ukraine) K Baindl | 6 | 6
WC | (Hungary) A Tóth | 3 | 1

Quarterfinals
8 | (Slovakia) AK Schmiedlová | 5 | 4
(United States) C Liu | 7 | 6
WC | (Hungary) F Stollár | 6^{5} | 3
(Ukraine) K Baindl | 7^{7} | 6

Semifinals
(United States) C Liu | 5 | 6^{3}
(Ukraine) K Baindl | 7 | 7^{7}

== Qualifying ==
=== Seeds ===
1. (Greece) Valentini Grammatikopoulou (qualifying competition, lucky loser)
2. Maria Timofeeva (qualifying competition, lucky loser)
3. (Spain) Irene Burillo Escorihuela (qualified)
4. (Slovenia) Kaja Juvan (qualified)
5. (United States) Louisa Chirico (qualified)
6. (Turkey) Berfu Cengiz (qualifying competition)
7. (Australia) Astra Sharma (qualified)
8. (Croatia) Jana Fett (qualifying competition)
9. (Slovenia) Nina Potocnik (qualifying competition)
10. (Ukraine) Kateryna Volodko (qualified)
11. (Ukraine) Valeriya Strakhova (qualifying competition)
12. (Germany) Lena Papadakis (first round)

=== Qualifiers ===
1. (Australia) Astra Sharma
2. (Czech Republic) Anna Sisková
3. (Spain) Irene Burillo Escorihuela
4. (Slovenia) Kaja Juvan
5. (United States) Louisa Chirico
6. (Ukraine) Kateryna Volodko

=== Lucky losers ===
1. (Greece) Valentini Grammatikopoulou
2. Maria Timofeeva

=== Qualifying draw ===
==== First qualifier ====
First round
1 | (Greece) Valentini Grammatikopoulou | 6 | 3 | 6
(Hungary) Adrienn Nagy | 2 | 6 | 4
WC | (Hungary) Rebeka Stolmár | 1 | 0
7 | (Australia) Astra Sharma | 6 | 6

Qualifying competition
1 | (Greece) Valentini Grammatikopoulou | 3 | 1
7 | (Australia) Astra Sharma | 6 | 6

==== Second qualifier ====
First round
2 | Maria Timofeeva | 6 | 6
(Norway) Ulrikke Eikeri | 3 | 2
(Czech Republic) Anna Sisková | 2 | 7^{8} | 6
12 | (Germany) Lena Papadakis | 6 | 6^{6} | 1

Qualifying competition
2 | Maria Timofeeva | 1 | 6 | 6^{5}
(Czech Republic) Anna Sisková | 6 | 3 | 7^{7}

==== Third qualifier ====
First round
3 | (Spain) Irene Burillo Escorihuela | 6 | 6
WC | (Hungary) Melinda Bíró | 2 | 2
(United Kingdom) Freya Christie | 2 | 3
9 | (Slovenia) Nina Potočnik | 6 | 6

Qualifying competition
3 | (Spain) Irene Burillo Escorihuela | 3 | 6 | 6
9 | (Slovenia) Nina Potočnik | 6 | 0 | 1

==== Fourth qualifier ====
First round
4 | (Slovenia) Kaja Juvan | 6 | 6
(United States) Jessie Aney | 2 | 0
WC | (Hungary) Anna Kántor | 1 | 1
11 | (Ukraine) Valeriya Strakhova | 6 | 6

Qualifying competition
4 | (Slovenia) Kaja Juvan | 6 | 1 | 6
11 | (Ukraine) Valeriya Strakhova | 3 | 6 | 4

==== Fifth qualifier ====
First round
5 | (United States) Louisa Chirico | 6 | 6
(France) Amandine Hesse | 1 | 1
WC | (Hungary) Panna Bartha | 4 | 4
8 | (Croatia) Jana Fett | 6 | 6

Qualifying competition
5 | (United States) Louisa Chirico | 7^{7} | 6
8 | (Croatia) Jana Fett | 6^{1} | 1

==== Sixth qualifier ====
First round
6 | (Turkey) Berfu Cengiz | 3 | 7^{7} | 6
(Czech Republic) Jesika Malečková | 6 | 6^{5} | 3
WC | (Hungary) Viktória Varga | 0 | 4
10 | (Ukraine) Kateryna Volodko | 6 | 6

Qualifying competition
6 | (Turkey) Berfu Cengiz | 5 | 6 | 4
10 | (Ukraine) Kateryna Volodko | 7 | 2 | 6
