= 2024 Budapest Grand Prix – Doubles =

Doubles
- 2024 Budapest Grand Prix

Final
- Champions: (Poland) Katarzyna Piter (Hungary) Fanny Stollár
- Runners-up: (Kazakhstan) Anna Danilina; Irina Khromacheva
- Score: 6–3, 3–6, [10–3]

Details
- Draw: 16
- Seeds: 4

Events
Singles	Doubles
- Budapest Grand Prix

Defending champions Katarzyna Piter and Fanny Stollár won the doubles title at the 2024 Budapest Grand Prix, defeating Anna Danilina and Irina Khromacheva in the final, 6–3, 3–6, [10–3].

== Seeds ==
1. (Hungary) Tímea Babos / (Australia) Ellen Perez (semifinals)
2. (Kazakhstan) Anna Danilina / Irina Khromacheva (final)
3. (United Kingdom) Maia Lumsden / (Czech Republic) Anna Sisková (first round)
4. (Hungary) Anna Bondár / Kamilla Rakhimova (second round)

== Draw ==
Key

- Q = Qualifier
- WC = Wild card
- LL = Lucky loser
- Alt = Alternate
- ITF = ITF entry
- PR = Protected ranking
- SR = Special ranking
- SE = Special exempt
- JE = Junior exempt
- JR = Junior Accelerator Programme entrant
- CO = College Accelerator Programme entrant
- NG = Next Gen Accelerator Program entrant
- w/o = Walkover
- r = Retired
- d = Defaulted

=== Draw ===
First round
1	(Hungary) T Babos (Australia) E Perez	6	1	[10]
WC	(Hungary) P Bartha (Hungary) A Tóth	1	6	[5]
(Slovenia) V Erjavec (Czech Republic) J Malečková	4	2
(China) Q Tang (China) Xiy Wang	6	6
3	(United Kingdom) M Lumsden (Czech Republic) A Sisková	6	5	[5]
A Anshba (United Kingdom) E Appleton	1	7	[10]
(Croatia) M Dražić (Germany) T Korpatsch	2	3
(Poland) K Piter (Hungary) F Stollár	6	6
WC	(Hungary) M Bíró (Hungary) G Nemcsek	1	6	[5]
(Netherlands) I Haverlag (United States) C Rosca	6	4	[10]
(Japan) M Uchijima (Chinese Taipei) F-h Wu
4	(Hungary) A Bondár; K Rakhimova	w/o
(United States) J Aney (Germany) L Papadakis	6	6
(United Kingdom) A Barnett (United Kingdom) F Christie	2	3
(Czech Republic) A Dețiuc (Netherlands) B Schoofs	2	1
2	(Kazakhstan) A Danilina; I Khromacheva	6	6

Quarterfinals
1	(Hungary) T Babos (Australia) E Perez	7^{8}	2	[10]
(China) Q Tang (China) Xiy Wang	6^{6}	6	[7]
A Anshba (United Kingdom) E Appleton	3	4
(Poland) K Piter (Hungary) F Stollár	6	6
(Netherlands) I Haverlag (United States) C Rosca	7^{7}	6
4	(Hungary) A Bondár; K Rakhimova	6^{4}	4
(United States) J Aney (Germany) L Papadakis	2	4
2	(Kazakhstan) A Danilina; I Khromacheva	6	6

Semifinals
1	(Hungary) T Babos (Australia) E Perez	3	4
(Poland) K Piter (Hungary) F Stollár	6	6
(Netherlands) I Haverlag (United States) C Rosca	1	3
2	(Kazakhstan) A Danilina; I Khromacheva	6	6

Final
(Poland) K Piter (Hungary) F Stollár	6	3	[10]
2	(Kazakhstan) A Danilina; I Khromacheva	3	6	[3]
