= 2023 Budapest Grand Prix – Doubles =

Doubles
- 2023 Budapest Grand Prix

Final
- Champions: (Poland) Katarzyna Piter (Hungary) Fanny Stollár
- Runners-up: (United States) Jessie Aney (Czech Republic) Anna Sisková
- Score: 6–2, 4–6, [10–4]

Details
- Draw: 16
- Seeds: 4

Events
Singles	Doubles
- Budapest Grand Prix

Katarzyna Piter and Fanny Stollár defeated Jessie Aney and Anna Sisková in the final, 6–2, 4–6, [10–4] to win the doubles tennis title at the 2023 Budapest Grand Prix. Both teams were unseeded.

Ekaterine Gorgodze and Oksana Kalashnikova were the reigning champions, but chose not to defend their title.

== Seeds ==
1. (Kazakhstan) Anna Danilina / (Norway) Ulrikke Eikeri (first round)
2. (Hungary) Anna Bondár / (China) Zhang Shuai (first round)
3. (Hungary) Tímea Babos / Alexandra Panova (first round)
4. (United States) Angela Kulikov / (United States) Sabrina Santamaria (quarterfinals)

== Draw ==
Key

- Q = Qualifier
- WC = Wild card
- LL = Lucky loser
- Alt = Alternate
- ITF = ITF entry
- PR = Protected ranking
- SR = Special ranking
- SE = Special exempt
- JE = Junior exempt
- JR = Junior Accelerator Programme entrant
- CO = College Accelerator Programme entrant
- NG = Next Gen Accelerator Program entrant
- w/o = Walkover
- r = Retired
- d = Defaulted

=== Draw ===
First round
1	(Kazakhstan) A Danilina (Norway) U Eikeri	3	6	[5]
A Fomina-Klotz (Ukraine) V Strakhova	6	3	[10]
(United Kingdom) F Christie (United Kingdom) A Collins	1	4
(Argentina) N Podoroska; K Rakhimova	6	6
3	(Hungary) T Babos; A Panova	4	5
(Poland) K Piter (Hungary) F Stollár	6	7
WC	(Hungary) A Nagy (Hungary) A Tóth	4	5
(Czech Republic) M Kolodziejová (Czech Republic) J Malečková	6	7
(United States) J Aney (Czech Republic) A Sisková	6	7
E Avanesyan; D Shnaider	4	5
(Japan) E Hozumi; I Khromacheva	2	3
4	(United States) A Kulikov (United States) S Santamaria	6	6
(Ukraine) K Volodko (Czech Republic) R Voráčová	6	6
WC	(Hungary) R Stolmár (Hungary) N Szabanin	3	2
(Australia) E Perez (Australia) D Saville	2	6	[10]
2	(Hungary) A Bondár (China) S Zhang	6	3	[7]

Quarterfinals
A Fomina-Klotz (Ukraine) V Strakhova	3	3
(Argentina) N Podoroska; K Rakhimova	6	6
(Poland) K Piter (Hungary) F Stollár	6^{4}	4
(Czech Republic) M Kolodziejová (Czech Republic) J Malečková	7^{7}	5^{r}
(United States) J Aney (Czech Republic) A Sisková	6	6
4	(United States) A Kulikov (United States) S Santamaria	3	2
(Ukraine) K Volodko (Czech Republic) R Voráčová	2	1
(Australia) E Perez (Australia) D Saville	6	6

Semifinals
(Argentina) N Podoroska; K Rakhimova	6^{3}	6^{5}
(Poland) K Piter (Hungary) F Stollár	7^{7}	7^{7}
(United States) J Aney (Czech Republic) A Sisková	w/o
(Australia) E Perez (Australia) D Saville

Final
(Poland) K Piter (Hungary) F Stollár	6	4	[10]
(United States) J Aney (Czech Republic) A Sisková	2	6	[4]
