= 2023 Ladies Open Vienna – Doubles =

Doubles
- 2023 Ladies Open Vienna

Final
- Champions: (Romania) Irina Bara (Poland) Weronika Falkowska
- Runners-up: (Austria) Melanie Klaffner (Austria) Sinja Kraus
- Score: 6–3, 2–6, [13–11]

Events
Singles	Doubles
← 2022 ·	Ladies Open Vienna	· 2024 →

Lena Papadakis and Anna Sisková were the defending champions but chose not to participate.

Irina Bara and Weronika Falkowska won the title, defeating Melanie Klaffner and Sinja Kraus in the final, 6–3, 2–6, [13–11].

== Seeds ==
1. (Romania) Irina Bara / (Poland) Weronika Falkowska (champions)
2. (Romania) Cristina Dinu / Ekaterina Makarova (quarterfinals)
3. (United States) Chiara Scholl / (Hungary) Amarissa Kiara Tóth (quarterfinals)
4. (Uzbekistan) Nigina Abduraimova / (Spain) Lucía Cortez Llorca (quarterfinals)

== Draw ==
=== Key ===
- Q = Qualifier
- WC = Wild card
- LL = Lucky loser
- Alt = Alternate
- SE = Special exempt
- PR = Protected ranking
- ITF = ITF entry
- JE = Junior exempt
- w/o = Walkover
- r = Retired
- d = Defaulted
- SR = Special ranking

First round
1	(Romania) I Bara (Poland) W Falkowska	0	6	[10]
(Hungary) A Nagy (Croatia) S Njirić	6	3	[7]
WC	(Norway) LN Koljenovic (Serbia) M Mašić	4	2
(Germany) A Klasen (Hungary) N Szabanin	6	6
3	(United States) C Scholl (Hungary) AK Tóth	6	5	[10]
(Japan) R Saigo (Japan) Y Saigo	3	7	[6]
(Slovenia) N Potočnik (Greece) S Sakellaridi	6	7
(Germany) T Morderger (Germany) Y Morderger	4	5
(Austria) M Klaffner (Austria) S Kraus	7^{7}	6
(Slovakia) S Milatová (Slovakia) E Tóthová	6^{3}	0
WC	(Austria) T Kostic (Austria) A Michalitsch	0	3
4	(Uzbekistan) N Abduraimova (Spain) L Cortez Llorca	6	6
WC	(Austria) V Bokor (Austria) LM Rothensteiner	3	4
(Romania) IG Ghioroaie (Romania) OG Simion	6	6
(Austria) A Koller; P Leykina	3	3
2	(Romania) C Dinu; E Makarova	6	6

Quarterfinals
1	(Romania) I Bara (Poland) W Falkowska	3	6	[10]
(Germany) A Klasen (Hungary) N Szabanin	6	2	[5]
3	(United States) C Scholl (Hungary) AK Tóth	2	4
(Slovenia) N Potočnik (Greece) S Sakellaridi	6	6
(Austria) M Klaffner (Austria) S Kraus	6	6
4	(Uzbekistan) N Abduraimova (Spain) L Cortez Llorca	4	4
(Romania) IG Ghioroaie (Romania) OG Simion	6	6
2	(Romania) C Dinu; E Makarova	2	1

Semifinals
1	(Romania) I Bara (Poland) W Falkowska	6	3	[10]
(Slovenia) N Potočnik (Greece) S Sakellaridi	3	6	[5]
(Austria) M Klaffner (Austria) S Kraus	7^{7}	6^{7}	[10]
(Romania) IG Ghioroaie (Romania) OG Simion	6^{1}	7^{9}	[7]

Final
1	(Romania) I Bara (Poland) W Falkowska	6	2	[13]
(Austria) M Klaffner (Austria) S Kraus	3	6	[11]
