= 2024 Šibenik Open =

Tennis tournament

- Date: 30 September–6 October 2024
- Category: ITF Women's World Tennis Tour
- Prize money: $60,000
- Surface: Clay / Outdoor
- Location: Šibenik, Croatia

Champions

Singles
- (Greece) Dimitra Pavlou

Doubles
- (Montenegro) Tea Nikčević / (Czech Republic) Lucie Urbanová
- Šibenik Open

The 2024 Šibenik Open was a professional tennis tournament played on outdoor clay courts. It was the twelfth edition of the tournament, which was part of the 2024 ITF Women's World Tennis Tour. It took place in Šibenik, Croatia between 30 September and 6 October 2024.

== Singles main draw entrants ==
=== Seeds ===
Country	Player	Rank	Seed
CRO	Petra Martić	102	1
FRA	Chloé Paquet	110	2
HUN	Panna Udvardy	135	3
ROU	Anca Todoni	136	4
LAT	Darja Semeņistaja	138	5
CZE	Sára Bejlek	148	6
FRA	Elsa Jacquemot	149	7
FRA	Séléna Janicijevic	155	8

- Rankings are as of 23 September 2024.

=== Other entrants ===
The following players received wildcards into the singles main draw:

- (Croatia) Ria Derniković
- (Croatia) Tena Lukas
- (Croatia) Iva Primorac
- (Serbia) Lola Radivojević

The following player received entry into the singles main draw as a special exempt:

- (Cyprus) Raluca Șerban

The following players received entry from the qualifying draw:

- (Brazil) Gabriela Cé
- (Slovenia) Živa Falkner
- (Romania) Gabriela Lee
- (Ukraine) Oleksandra Oliynykova
- (Greece) Dimitra Pavlou
- (Germany) Marie Vogt
- (Germany) Stephanie Wagner
- (Croatia) Tara Würth

The following players received entry as lucky losers:

- (United States) Tyra Caterina Grant
- (Czech Republic) Aneta Kučmová
- (Turkey) İpek Öz
- (Hungary) Amarissa Tóth
