= 2024 Budapest Grand Prix =

Women's tennis tournament

- Date: 15–21 July
- Edition: 22nd
- Category: WTA 250
- Draw: 32S / 16D
- Surface: Clay / outdoor
- Location: Budapest, Hungary
- Venue: Római Tennis Academy

Champions

Singles
- Diana Shnaider

Doubles
- (Poland) Katarzyna Piter / (Hungary) Fanny Stollár
- Budapest Grand Prix

The 2024 Hungarian Grand Prix was a women's tennis tournament played on outdoor clay courts. It was the 22nd edition of the event, a WTA 250-level tournament on the 2024 WTA Tour. It took place at Római Tennis Academy in Budapest, Hungary, from 15 July through 21 July 2024. First-seeded Diana Shnaider won the singles title.

== Finals ==
=== Singles ===
- Diana Shnaider defeated Aliaksandra Sasnovich, 6–4, 6–4

=== Doubles ===
- (Poland) Katarzyna Piter / (Hungary) Fanny Stollár defeated (Kazakhstan) Anna Danilina / Irina Khromacheva 6–3, 3–6, [10–3]

== Singles main draw entrants ==
=== Seeds ===
Country	Player	Rank^{†}	Seed
	Diana Shnaider	30	1
BUL	Viktoriya Tomova	48	2
CHN	Wang Xiyu	54	3
ESP	Sara Sorribes Tormo	55	4
POL	Magdalena Fręch	58	5
ARG	Nadia Podoroska	65	6
JPN	Moyuka Uchijima	68	7
FRA	Varvara Gracheva	70	8

^{†} Rankings are as of 1 July 2024

=== Other entrants ===
The following players received wildcard entry into the singles main draw:

- (Hungary) Tímea Babos
- (Hungary) Fanny Stollár
- (Hungary) Natália Szabanin

The following players received entry from the qualifying draw:

- (Romania) Miriam Bulgaru
- Ekaterina Makarova
- (France) Carole Monnet
- (Bulgaria) Gergana Topalova
- (Hungary) Amarissa Tóth
- (Switzerland) Simona Waltert

The following player received entry as a lucky loser:

- (Germany) Ella Seidel

=== Withdrawals ===
- Ekaterina Alexandrova → replaced by (Hungary) Anna Bondár
- (Hungary) Dalma Gálfi → replaced by (Germany) Ella Seidel
- (Ukraine) Anhelina Kalinina → replaced by Aliaksandra Sasnovich
- Daria Kasatkina → replaced by (Slovakia) Rebecca Šramková
- (Kazakhstan) Yulia Putintseva → replaced by Kamilla Rakhimova
- (Australia) Daria Saville → replaced by (Netherlands) Suzan Lamens
- (Germany) Laura Siegemund → replaced by (Germany) Eva Lys
- (United States) Taylor Townsend → replaced by (Serbia) Olga Danilović

== Doubles main draw entrants ==
=== Seeds ===
Country	Player	Country	Player	Rank^{†}	Seed
HUN	Tímea Babos	AUS	Ellen Perez	70	1
KAZ	Anna Danilina		Irina Khromacheva	95	2
GBR	Maia Lumsden	CZE	Anna Sisková	127	3
HUN	Anna Bondár		Kamilla Rakhimova	151	4

† Rankings are as of 1 July 2024

=== Other entrants ===
The following pairs received wildcard entry into main draw:

- (Hungary) Panna Bartha / (Hungary) Amarissa Tóth
- (Hungary) Melinda Bíró / (Hungary) Gréta Nemcsek
