= 2023 Budapest Grand Prix =

Women's tennis tournament

- Date: 17–23 July
- Edition: 21st
- Category: WTA 250
- Draw: 32S / 16D
- Surface: Clay / outdoor
- Location: Budapest, Hungary
- Venue: Római Tennis Academy

Champions

Singles
- Maria Timofeeva

Doubles
- (Poland) Katarzyna Piter / (Hungary) Fanny Stollár
- Budapest Grand Prix

The 2023 Hungarian Grand Prix was a women's tennis tournament played on outdoor clay courts. It was the 21st edition of the event, a WTA 250-level tournament on the 2023 WTA Tour. It took place at Római Tennis Academy in Budapest, Hungary, from 17 through 23 July 2023. Unseeded Maria Timofeeva, who entered the main draw as a lucky loser, won the singles title.

== Finals ==
=== Singles ===
- Maria Timofeeva defeated (Ukraine) Kateryna Baindl, 6–3, 3–6, 6–0

=== Doubles ===
- (Poland) Katarzyna Piter / (Hungary) Fanny Stollár defeated (United States) Jessie Aney / (Czech Republic) Anna Sisková, 6–2, 4–6, [10–4]

== Singles main draw entrants ==
=== Seeds ===
Country	Player	Rank^{†}	Seed
USA	Bernarda Pera	27	1
CHN	Zhang Shuai	38	2
~~ITA~~	~~Camila Giorgi~~	~~48~~	~~3~~
KAZ	Yulia Putintseva	56	4
GER	Tatjana Maria	62	5
	Elina Avanesyan	68	6
	Kamilla Rakhimova	72	7
SVK	Anna Karolína Schmiedlová	77	8
ARG	Nadia Podoroska	80	9

^{†} Rankings are as of 3 July 2023

=== Other entrants ===
The following players received wildcard entry into the singles main draw:

- (Hungary) Fanny Stollár
- (Hungary) Natália Szabanin
- (Hungary) Amarissa Tóth

The following players received entry with a protected ranking:

- (Slovakia) Kristína Kučová
- Evgeniya Rodina

The following players received entry from the qualifying draw:

- (Spain) Irene Burillo Escorihuela
- (United States) Louisa Chirico
- (Slovenia) Kaja Juvan
- (Australia) Astra Sharma
- (Czech Republic) Anna Sisková
- (Ukraine) Kateryna Volodko

The following players received entry as lucky losers:

- (Greece) Valentini Grammatikopoulou
- Maria Timofeeva

=== Withdrawals ===
- (Romania) Sorana Cîrstea → replaced by (Germany) Tamara Korpatsch
- (Italy) Camila Giorgi → replaced by (Greece) Valentini Grammatikopoulou
- Anna Kalinskaya → replaced by (France) Carole Monnet
- (Estonia) Kaia Kanepi → replaced by Polina Kudermetova
- (Czech Republic) Tereza Martincová → replaced by Maria Timofeeva
- Anastasia Potapova → replaced by (Slovakia) Rebecca Šramková
- (Bulgaria) Viktoriya Tomova → replaced by (Australia) Storm Hunter
- (United States) Taylor Townsend → replaced by (Hungary) Tímea Babos

== Doubles main draw entrants ==
=== Seeds ===
Country	Player	Country	Player	Rank^{†}	Seed
KAZ	Anna Danilina	NOR	Ulrikke Eikeri	68	1
HUN	Anna Bondár	CHN	Zhang Shuai	86	2
HUN	Tímea Babos		Alexandra Panova	130	3
USA	Angela Kulikov	USA	Sabrina Santamaria	130	4

† Rankings are as of 3 July 2023

=== Other entrants ===
The following pairs received wildcard entry into main draw:

- (Hungary) Adrienn Nagy / (Hungary) Amarissa Tóth
- (Hungary) Rebeka Stolmár / (Hungary) Natália Szabanin
