= Šibenik Open =

- 2024 Šibenik Open

ITF Women's Tour
- Event name: Šibenik Open (2021–present); Solaris Šibenik Open (2008–14)
- Location: Šibenik, Croatia
- Venue: Teniski klub "Šubicevac"
- Category: ITF Women's World Tennis Tour
- Surface: Clay
- Draw: 32S/32Q/16D
- Prize money: $60,000
- Website: Official website

The Šibenik Open is a tournament for professional female tennis players played on outdoor clay courts. The event is classified as a $60,000 ITF Women's World Tennis Tour tournament and has been held in Šibenik, Croatia, since 2008.

== Past finals ==
=== Singles ===
| Year | Champion | Runner-up | Score |
|---|---|---|---|
| 2025 | (Croatia) Ana Konjuh | (Slovenia) Pia Lovrič | 6–2, 6–2 |
| 2024 | (Czech Republic) Sára Bejlek | (Latvia) Darja Semeņistaja | 6–2, 6–0 |
| 2023 | (Greece) Dimitra Pavlou | (Serbia) Jana Bojović | 7–5, 6–4 |
| 2022 | (Spain) Jéssica Bouzas Maneiro | (Spain) Leyre Romero Gormaz | 6–3, 6–3 |
| 2021 (2) | (France) Léolia Jeanjean | (Bosnia and Herzegovina) Nefisa Berberović | 6–2, 6–4 |
| 2021 (1) | (Bosnia and Herzegovina) Dea Herdželaš | (Czech Republic) Darja Viďmanová | 6–2, 3–6, 6–4 |
| 2015–20 | Not held | | |
| 2014 | (Serbia) Katarina Jokić | (Croatia) Iva Mekovec | 6–4, 6–1 |
| 2013 | (Hungary) Ágnes Bukta | (Czech Republic) Barbora Krejčíková | 6–3, 6–2 |
| 2012 | (Croatia) Indire Akiki | (Slovenia) Tjaša Šrimpf | 7–5, 6–2 |
| 2011 | (Canada) Eugenie Bouchard | (France) Jessica Ginier | 6–2, 6–0 |
| 2010 | (Romania) Mădălina Gojnea | (Switzerland) Conny Perrin | 6–2, 6–1 |
| 2009 | (Italy) Evelyn Mayr | (Italy) Annalisa Bona | 7–5, 7–6^{(7–3)} |
| 2008 | (Poland) Karolina Kosińska | (Croatia) Tamara Stojković | 7–5, 6–1 |

=== Doubles ===
| Year | Champions | Runners-up | Score |
|---|---|---|---|
| 2025 | (Slovakia) Laura Svatíková (Czech Republic) Eliška Ticháčková | (United States) Mia Horvit (Switzerland) Marie Mettraux | 6–3, 6–1 |
| 2024 | (Slovenia) Živa Falkner (Hungary) Amarissa Tóth | (Cyprus) Raluca Șerban (Romania) Anca Todoni | 2–1 ret. |
| 2023 | (Montenegro) Tea Nikčević (Czech Republic) Lucie Urbanová | (Germany) Marie Vogt (Germany) Eva Marie Voracek | 7–5, 7–6^{(7–4)} |
| 2022 | (Poland) Weronika Falkowska (Australia) Jaimee Fourlis | (Greece) Eleni Christofi (United States) Christina Rosca | 6–4, 6–2 |
| 2021 (2) | (Croatia) Petra Marčinko (Hungary) Natália Szabanin | (Bosnia and Herzegovina) Nefisa Berberović (Italy) Nicole Fossa Huergo | 6–4, 3–6, [10–4] |
| 2021 (1) | (Croatia) Petra Marčinko (Hungary) Natália Szabanin | (Russia) Darya Astakhova (Russia) Ekaterina Makarova | 6–4, 6–3 |
| 2015–20 | Not held | | |
| 2014 | (Hungary) Ágnes Bukta (Bulgaria) Viktoriya Tomova | (Czech Republic) Eva Rutarová (Czech Republic) Karolína Stuchlá | 7–6^{(14–12)}, 6–1 |
| 2013 | (Czech Republic) Barbora Krejčíková (Russia) Polina Leykina | (Netherlands) Cindy Burger (Germany) Anna Klasen | 3–6, 6–3, [12–10] |
| 2012 | (Ukraine) Sofiya Kovalets (Sweden) Hilda Melander | (Hungary) Vaszilisza Bulgakova (Germany) Anne Schäfer | 2–1, ret. |
| 2011 | (Switzerland) Mateja Kraljevic (Switzerland) Amra Sadiković | (Czech Republic) Simona Dobrá (Czech Republic) Tereza Hladíková | 7–5, 6–3 |
| 2010 | (Romania) Alexandra Cadanțu (Bulgaria) Dalia Zafirova | (Croatia) Maria Abramović (Romania) Mădălina Gojnea | 6–2, 6–3 |
| 2009 | (Serbia) Teodora Mirčić (Serbia) Nataša Zorić | (Slovenia) Tina Bohorič (Slovenia) Mika Urbančič | 6–0, 6–3 |
| 2008 | (Poland) Karolina Kosińska (Czech Republic) Darina Šeděnková | (Italy) Nicole Clerico (Italy) Giorgia Mortello | 4–6, 7–6^{(7–5)}, [10–8] |
