= 2024 Šibenik Open – Singles =

Singles
- 2024 Šibenik Open

Final
- Champion: (Czech Republic) Sára Bejlek
- Runner-up: (Latvia) Darja Semeņistaja
- Score: 6–2, 6–0

Events
Singles	men	women
Doubles	men	women
← 2023 ·	Šibenik Open	· 2025 →

Dimitra Pavlou was the defending champion, but lost in the first round to Iva Primorac.

Sára Bejlek won the title, defeating Darja Semeņistaja in the final; 6–2, 6–0.

== Seeds ==
1. (Croatia) Petra Martić (first round)
2. (France) Chloé Paquet (first round)
3. (Hungary) Panna Udvardy (second round)
4. (Romania) Anca Todoni (second round)
5. (Latvia) Darja Semeņistaja (final)
6. (Czech Republic) Sára Bejlek (champion)
7. (France) Elsa Jacquemot (first round)
8. (France) Séléna Janicijevic (second round)

== Draw ==
=== Key ===
- Q = Qualifier
- WC = Wild card
- LL = Lucky loser
- Alt = Alternate
- SE = Special exempt
- PR = Protected ranking
- ITF = ITF entry
- JE = Junior exempt
- w/o = Walkover
- r = Retired
- d = Defaulted
- SR = Special ranking

=== Finals ===
Semifinals
5	(Latvia) Darja Semeņistaja	6	5	6
LL	(Turkey) İpek Öz	3	7	3
(Liechtenstein) Kathinka Von Deichmann	1	1
6	(Czech Republic) Sára Bejlek	6	6

Final
5	(Latvia) Darja Semeņistaja	2	0
6	(Czech Republic) Sára Bejlek	6	6

=== Top half ===
First round
1	(Croatia) P Martić	4	3
(Slovenia) V Erjavec	6	6
Q	(Romania) G Lee	6	7
(Croatia) L Ćirić Bagarić	4	5
Q	(Brazil) G Cé	5	2
SE	(Cyprus) R Șerban	7	6
WC	(Croatia) R Derniković	1	5
5	(Latvia) D Semeņistaja	6	7
3	(Hungary) P Udvardy	'6	7^{7}
LL	(Czech Republic) A Kučmová	2	6^{4}
LL	(Turkey) İ Öz	7	6
(Germany) N Noha Akugue	5	4
Q	(Germany) M Vogt	2	0
Q	(Germany) S Wagner	6	6
Q	(Croatia) T Würth	4	2
8	(France) S Janicijevic	6	6

Second round
(Slovenia) V Erjavec	6	6
Q	(Romania) G Lee	1	2
SE	(Cyprus) R Șerban	0	0
5	(Latvia) D Semeņistaja	6	6
3	(Hungary) P Udvardy	2	6	6^{3}
LL	(Turkey) İ Öz	6	1	7^{7}
Q	(Germany) S Wagner	6	4	6
8	(France) S Janicijevic	2	6	3

Quarterfinals
(Slovenia) V Erjavec	6^{3}	6^{1}
5	(Latvia) D Semeņistaja	7^{7}	7^{7}
LL	(Turkey) İ Öz	6	1	6
Q	(Germany) S Wagner	2	6	3

Semifinals
5	(Latvia) D Semeņistaja	6	5	6
LL	(Turkey) İ Öz	3	7	3

=== Bottom half ===
First round
7	(France) E Jacquemot	6	3	1
(Liechtenstein) K Von Deichmann	1	6	6
Q	(Greece) D Pavlou	3	2
WC	(Croatia) I Primorac	6	6
(Australia) A Sharma	1	0
(Italy) N Brancaccio	6	6
WC	(Croatia) T Lukas	4	3
4	(Romania) A Todoni	6	6
6	(Czech Republic) S Bejlek	6	6
LL	(United States) TC Grant	4	4
Q	(Ukraine) O Oliynykova	7^{7}	6
WC	(Spain) L Romero Gormaz	6^{3}	1
Q	(Slovenia) Ž Falkner	3	7	6
LL	(Hungary) A Tóth	6	5	3
WC	(Serbia) L Radivojević	6	6
2	(France) C Paquet	3	3

Second round
(Liechtenstein) K Von Deichmann	6	6
WC	(Croatia) I Primorac	2	1
(Italy) N Brancaccio	6	4	6
4	(Romania) A Todoni	3	6	4
6	(Czech Republic) S Bejlek	6	2	6
Q	(Ukraine) O Oliynykova	2	6	0
Q	(Slovenia) Ž Falkner	6^{6}	3
WC	(Serbia) L Radivojević	7^{8}	0^{r}

Quarterfinals
(Liechtenstein) K Von Deichmann	7	6
(Italy) N Brancaccio	5	1
6	(Czech Republic) S Bejlek	6	7^{7}
Q	(Slovenia) Ž Falkner	2	6^{5}

Semifinals
(Liechtenstein) K Von Deichmann	1	1
6	(Czech Republic) S Bejlek	6	6
