= 2023 Ladies Open Vienna – Singles =

Singles
- 2023 Ladies Open Vienna

Final
- Champion: (Croatia) Tena Lukas
- Runner-up: (Romania) Miriam Bulgaru
- Score: 7–5, 6–1

Events
Singles	Doubles
← 2022 ·	Ladies Open Vienna	· 2024 →

Natália Szabanin was the defending champion but lost in the second round to Sinja Kraus.

Tena Lukas won the title, defeating Miriam Bulgaru in the final, 7–5, 6–1.

== Seeds ==
1. (Hungary) Dalma Gálfi (first round)
2. (Ukraine) Katarina Zavatska (first round)
3. (Uzbekistan) Nigina Abduraimova (quarterfinals)
4. (Spain) Leyre Romero Gormaz (second round)
5. (Austria) Sinja Kraus (quarterfinals)
6. (Romania) Irina Bara (semifinals)
7. (Romania) Miriam Bulgaru (final)
8. Ekaterina Makarova (first round)

== Draw ==
=== Key ===
- Q = Qualifier
- WC = Wild card
- LL = Lucky loser
- Alt = Alternate
- SE = Special exempt
- PR = Protected ranking
- ITF = ITF entry
- JE = Junior exempt
- w/o = Walkover
- r = Retired
- d = Defaulted
- SR = Special ranking

=== Finals ===
Semifinals
Q	(Slovenia) Polona Hercog	6	4	6^{8}
7	(Romania) Miriam Bulgaru	2	6	7^{10}
6	(Romania) Irina Bara	5	6	4
(Croatia) Tena Lukas	7	2	6

Final
7	(Romania) Miriam Bulgaru	5	1
(Croatia) Tena Lukas	7	6

=== Top half ===
First round
1	(Hungary) D Gálfi	4	2
Q	(Romania) IG Ghioroaie	6	6
(Greece) S Sakellaridi	6	1	4
Q	(Slovenia) P Hercog	3	6	6
Q	(Hungary) AK Tóth	3	7	6
WC	(Austria) T Kostic	6	5	1
(Romania) C Dinu	6	6
8	E Makarova	1	2
3	(Uzbekistan) N Abduraimova	6	6^{6}	6
WC	(Austria) M Klaffner	4	7^{8}	4
Q	V Kan	6^{2}	7	6
Q	(Germany) T Morderger	7^{7}	5	2
Q	(Japan) C Muramatsu	2	3
J Avdeeva	6	6
SE	(Romania) A Mitu	1	0^{r}
7	(Romania) M Bulgaru	6	1

Second round
Q	(Romania) IG Ghioroaie	6	2	0
Q	(Slovenia) P Hercog	3	6	6
Q	(Hungary) AK Tóth	1	3
(Romania) C Dinu	6	6
3	(Uzbekistan) N Abduraimova	6	6
Q	V Kan	3	4
J Avdeeva	0	3
7	(Romania) M Bulgaru	6	6

Quarterfinals
Q	(Slovenia) P Hercog	6	6
(Romania) C Dinu	4	4
3	(Uzbekistan) N Abduraimova	4	6	0
7	(Romania) M Bulgaru	6	4	6

Semifinals
Q	(Slovenia) P Hercog	6	4	6^{8}
7	(Romania) M Bulgaru	2	6	7^{10}

=== Bottom half ===
First round
6	(Romania) I Bara	5
(Romania) A Cadanțu-Ignatik	1^{r}
SE	(Croatia) I Primorac	7	1	2
(Japan) R Saigo	5	6	6
WC	(Austria) A Michalitsch	2	2
(North Macedonia) L Gjorcheska	6	6
WC	(Austria) A Koller	2	1
4	(Spain) L Romero Gormaz	6	6
5	(Austria) S Kraus	6	6
Q	(Slovakia) E Tóthová	0	3
Q	(Spain) L Cortez Llorca	4	3
(Hungary) N Szabanin	6	6
(Croatia) T Lukas	6	6
(Slovenia) N Potočnik	4	2
(Poland) W Falkowska	6	2	6
2	(Ukraine) K Zavatska	4	6	0

Second round
6	(Romania) I Bara	6	6
(Japan) R Saigo	3	4
(North Macedonia) L Gjorcheska	6	1	7
4	(Spain) L Romero Gormaz	2	6	5
5	(Austria) S Kraus	6	6
(Hungary) N Szabanin	4	0
(Croatia) T Lukas	6	6
(Poland) W Falkowska	1	3

Quarterfinals
6	(Romania) I Bara	7^{7}	6
(North Macedonia) L Gjorcheska	6^{4}	4
5	(Austria) S Kraus	6	0	2
(Croatia) T Lukas	4	6	6

Semifinals
6	(Romania) I Bara	5	6	4
(Croatia) T Lukas	7	2	6
