= 2013 Budapest Grand Prix – Doubles =

Doubles
- 2013 Budapest Grand Prix

Final
- Champions: (Czech Republic) Andrea Hlaváčková (Czech Republic) Lucie Hradecká
- Runners-up: (Russia) Nina Bratchikova (Georgia (country)) Anna Tatishvili
- Score: 6–4, 6–1

Details
- Draw: 8
- Seeds: 2

Events
Singles	Doubles
← 2012 ·	Budapest Grand Prix	· 2021 →

Janette Husárová and Magdaléna Rybáriková were the defending champions but decided not to participate.
Andrea Hlaváčková and Lucie Hradecká won the title, defeating Nina Bratchikova and Anna Tatishvili in the final, 6–4, 6–1.

== Seeds ==
1. (Czech Republic) Andrea Hlaváčková / (Czech Republic) Lucie Hradecká (champions)
2. (Hungary) Tímea Babos / (Poland) Alicja Rosolska (quarterfinals)

== Draw ==
=== Key ===
- Q = Qualifier
- WC = Wild card
- LL = Lucky loser
- Alt = Alternate
- SE = Special exempt
- PR = Protected ranking
- ITF = ITF entry
- JE = Junior exempt
- w/o = Walkover
- r = Retired
- d = Defaulted
- SR = Special ranking

=== Draw ===
Quarterfinals
1	(Czech Republic) A Hlaváčková (Czech Republic) L Hradecká	6	6
WC	(Hungary) L Barzó (Hungary) D Gálfi	3	1
(South Africa) N Grandin (Croatia) P Martić	6	6
(Romania) R Olaru (Russia) V Solovyeva	4	2
(Russia) N Bratchikova (Georgia (country)) A Tatishvili	7	6
WC	(Hungary) Á Bukta (Hungary) R-L Jani	5	3
(Austria) S Klemenschits (Slovenia) A Klepač	7	6
2	(Hungary) T Babos (Poland) A Rosolska	5	1

Semifinals
1	(Czech Republic) A Hlaváčková (Czech Republic) L Hradecká	7^{7}	6
(South Africa) N Grandin (Croatia) P Martić	6^{4}	2
(Russia) N Bratchikova (Georgia (country)) A Tatishvili	6	6
(Austria) S Klemenschits (Slovenia) A Klepač	1	2

Final
1	(Czech Republic) A Hlaváčková (Czech Republic) L Hradecká	6	6
(Russia) N Bratchikova (Georgia (country)) A Tatishvili	4	1
