= 2024 Šibenik Open – Doubles =

Doubles
- 2024 Šibenik Open

Final
- Champions: (Slovenia) Živa Falkner (Hungary) Amarissa Tóth
- Runners-up: (Cyprus) Raluca Șerban (Romania) Anca Todoni
- Score: 2–1 ret.

Events
Singles	Doubles
← 2023 ·	Šibenik Open	· 2025 →

Tea Nikčević and Lucie Urbanová were the defending champions but Urbanová chose not to participate. Nikčević partnered Mariana Dražić, but they lost in the first round to Ria Derniković and Chiara Jerolimov.

Živa Falkner and Amarissa Tóth won the title, after Raluca Șerban and Anca Todoni retired from the final trailing 2–1.

== Seeds ==
1. (Czech Republic) Jesika Malečková / (Czech Republic) Miriam Škoch (semifinals, retired)
2. (Slovenia) Veronika Erjavec / (Latvia) Darja Semeņistaja (quarterfinals)
3. (Ukraine) Maryna Kolb / (Ukraine) Nadiia Kolb (quarterfinals)
4. (Italy) Nuria Brancaccio / (Spain) Leyre Romero Gormaz (quarterfinals)

== Draw ==
=== Key ===
- Q = Qualifier
- WC = Wild card
- LL = Lucky loser
- Alt = Alternate
- SE = Special exempt
- PR = Protected ranking
- ITF = ITF entry
- JE = Junior exempt
- w/o = Walkover
- r = Retired
- d = Defaulted
- SR = Special ranking

First round
(Croatia) R Derniković (Croatia) C Jerolimov	6	6
(Croatia) M Dražić (Montenegro) T Nikčevic	3	2
4	(Italy) N Brancaccio (Spain) L Romero Gormaz	6	6
(Serbia) L Radivojević (Croatia) T Würth	3	4
(Romania) G Lee (Australia) A Sharma	5	2
(Cyprus) R Șerban (Romania) A Todoni	7	6
(Greece) D Pavlou (Germany) M Vogt	4	1
(Slovenia) Ž Falkner (Hungary) A Tóth	6	6
(Italy) E Chiesa (United States) TC Grant	6	6
(Croatia) N Bumbak (Croatia) S Knez	1	0

Quarterfinals
1	(Czech Republic) J Malečková (Czech Republic) M Škoch	6	6
(Croatia) R Derniković (Croatia) C Jerolimov	4	2
4	(Italy) N Brancaccio (Spain) L Romero Gormaz	4	7^{7}	[8]
(Cyprus) R Șerban (Romania) A Todoni	6	6^{3}	[10]
(Slovenia) Ž Falkner (Hungary) A Tóth	6	6
3	(Ukraine) M Kolb (Ukraine) N Kolb	2	2
(Italy) E Chiesa (United States) TC Grant	6	1	[10]
2	(Slovenia) V Erjavec (Latvia) D Semeņistaja	2	6	[7]

Semifinals
1	(Czech Republic) J Malečková (Czech Republic) M Škoch	7^{7}	0^{r}
(Cyprus) R Șerban (Romania) A Todoni	6^{3}	3
(Slovenia) Ž Falkner (Hungary) A Tóth	6	6
(Italy) E Chiesa (United States) TC Grant	4	2

Final
(Cyprus) R Șerban (Romania) A Todoni	1^{r}
(Slovenia) Ž Falkner (Hungary) A Tóth	2
