= 2021 Budapest Grand Prix =

Women's tennis tournament

- Date: 12–18 July
- Edition: 19th
- Category: WTA 250
- Draw: 32S / 16D
- Prize money: $235,238
- Surface: Clay / outdoor
- Location: Budapest, Hungary
- Venue: Római Tennis Academy

Champions

Singles
- (Kazakhstan) Yulia Putintseva

Doubles
- (Romania) Mihaela Buzărnescu / (Hungary) Fanny Stollár
← 2013 ·	Budapest Grand Prix	· 2022 →

The 2021 Hungarian Grand Prix was a women's tennis tournament played on outdoor clay courts. It was the 19th edition of the Budapest Grand Prix, a 250-level tournament on the 2021 WTA Tour. It took place at Római Tennis Academy in Budapest, Hungary, from 12 July through 18 July 2021. First-seeded Yulia Putintseva won the singles title.

== Finals ==
=== Singles ===
- (Kazakhstan) Yulia Putintseva defeated (Ukraine) Anhelina Kalinina, 6–4, 6–0.

=== Doubles ===
- (Romania) Mihaela Buzărnescu / (Hungary) Fanny Stollár defeated (Spain) Aliona Bolsova / (Germany) Tamara Korpatsch, 6–4, 6–4

== Singles main-draw entrants ==
=== Seeds ===
Country	Player	Rank^{1}	Seed
KAZ	Yulia Putintseva	43	1
USA	Danielle Collins	48	2
USA	Bernarda Pera	74	3
ROU	Irina-Camelia Begu	79	4
ROU	Ana Bogdan	91	5
BLR	Aliaksandra Sasnovich	100	6
BUL	Viktoriya Tomova	104	7
ITA	Sara Errani	105	8

- ^{1} Rankings are as of 28 June 2021

=== Other entrants ===
The following players received wildcards into the main draw:

- (Hungary) Dalma Gálfi
- (Hungary) Réka Luca Jani
- (Hungary) Panna Udvardy

The following players received entry using a protected ranking:

- (Serbia) Ivana Jorović
- (Ukraine) Kateryna Kozlova
- (Slovakia) Anna Karolína Schmiedlová

The following players received entry from the qualifying draw:

- (Romania) Jaqueline Cristian
- (Serbia) Olga Danilović
- (Georgia (country)) Ekaterine Gorgodze
- (Austria) Julia Grabher
- (Croatia) Tereza Mrdeža
- (Argentina) Paula Ormaechea

The following player received entry as a lucky loser:

- (Italy) Martina Di Giuseppe

=== Withdrawals ===
Before the tournament

- (Poland) Magdalena Fręch → replaced by (Spain) Aliona Bolsova
- (Slovenia) Polona Hercog → replaced by (Germany) Tamara Korpatsch
- (Montenegro) Danka Kovinić → replaced by (Egypt) Mayar Sherif
- (Argentina) Nadia Podoroska → replaced by (Croatia) Ana Konjuh
- (Latvia) Anastasija Sevastova → replaced by (Ukraine) Anhelina Kalinina
- (Germany) Laura Siegemund → replaced by (Austria) Barbara Haas
- (Romania) Patricia Maria Țig → replaced by (Italy) Martina Di Giuseppe

== Doubles main-draw entrants ==
=== Seeds ===
Country	Player	Country	Player	Rank^{1}	Seed
RUS	Anna Kalinskaya	RUS	Yana Sizikova	202	1
HUN	Tímea Babos	HUN	Réka Luca Jani	223	2
KAZ	Anna Danilina	BLR	Lidziya Marozava	242	3
EGY	Mayar Sherif	CZE	Renata Voráčová	260	4

- ^{1} Rankings are as of 28 June 2021

=== Other entrants ===
The following pairs received wildcards into the doubles main draw:

- (Hungary) Dorka Drahota-Szabó / (Hungary) Luca Udvardy
- (Hungary) Natália Szabanin / (Hungary) Amarissa Kiara Tóth

=== Withdrawals ===
Before the tournament

- (United Kingdom) Naomi Broady / (United States) Jamie Loeb → replaced by (United States) Jamie Loeb / (Hungary) Panna Udvardy
- (Belarus) Vera Lapko / (Slovakia) Tereza Mihalíková → replaced by (Georgia (country)) Ekaterine Gorgodze / (Slovakia) Tereza Mihalíková

During the tournament

- (Hungary) Tímea Babos / (Hungary) Réka Luca Jani
- (Romania) Irina Bara / (Italy) Sara Errani
- (Serbia) Olga Danilović / (Serbia) Ivana Jorović
