= 2013 Budapest Grand Prix – Singles =

Singles
- 2013 Budapest Grand Prix

Final
- Champion: (Romania) Simona Halep
- Runner-up: (Austria) Yvonne Meusburger
- Score: 6–3, 6–7^{(7–9)}, 6–1

Details
- Draw: 32
- Seeds: 8

Events
| Singles | Doubles |
| ← 2012 · | Budapest Grand Prix | · 2021 → |

Sara Errani was the defending champion, but chose to compete in Palermo instead.
Simona Halep won the title, defeating Yvonne Meusburger in the final, 6–3, 6–7^{(7–9)}, 6–1.

== Seeds ==
1. (Czech Republic) Lucie Šafářová (first round)
2. (France) Alizé Cornet (first round)
3. (Romania) Simona Halep (champion)
4. (Germany) Annika Beck (quarterfinals)
5. (Sweden) Johanna Larsson (second round)
6. (South Africa) Chanelle Scheepers (semifinals)
7. (Spain) María Teresa Torró Flor (second round)
8. (Georgia (country)) Anna Tatishvili (second round)

== Draw ==
=== Key ===
- Q = Qualifier
- WC = Wild card
- LL = Lucky loser
- Alt = Alternate
- SE = Special exempt
- PR = Protected ranking
- ITF = ITF entry
- JE = Junior exempt
- w/o = Walkover
- r = Retired
- d = Defaulted
- SR = Special ranking

=== Finals ===
Semifinals
6 | (South Africa) Chanelle Scheepers | 2 | 2
(Austria) Yvonne Meusburger | 6 | 6
3 | (Romania) Simona Halep | 6 | 7^{7}
(Romania) Alexandra Cadanțu | 2 | 6^{1}

Final
(Austria) Yvonne Meusburger | 3 | 7^{9} | 1
3 | (Romania) Simona Halep | 6 | 6^{7} | 6

=== Top half ===
First round
1 | (Czech Republic) L Šafářová | 1 | 0
(Russia) V Solovyeva | 6 | 6
(Montenegro) D Kovinić | 6 | 3 | 6
(United Kingdom) J Konta | 2 | 6 | 2
WC | (Hungary) V Lukács | 3 | 0
(Croatia) P Martić | 6 | 6
(Slovakia) M Hončová | 4 | 1
6 | (South Africa) C Scheepers | 6 | 6
4 | (Germany) A Beck | 6 | 6
(Slovenia) T Majerič | 1 | 2
(Austria) Y Meusburger | 6 | 6
(Belgium) A Van Uytvanck | 0 | 2
(Spain) L Arruabarrena | 2 | 5
5 | (Sweden) J Larsson | 6 | 7

Second round
(Russia) V Solovyeva | 1 | 6 | 1
(Montenegro) D Kovinić | 6 | 3 | 6
(Croatia) P Martić | 5 | 4
6 | (South Africa) C Scheepers | 7 | 6
4 | (Germany) A Beck | 6 | 6
(Czech Republic) L Hradecká | 3 | 3
(Austria) Y Meusburger | 3 | 6 | 6
5 | (Sweden) J Larsson | 6 | 4 | 4

Quarterfinals
(Montenegro) D Kovinić | 6 | 0 | 6^{5}
6 | (South Africa) C Scheepers | 4 | 6 | 7^{7}
4 | (Germany) A Beck | 4 | 1
(Austria) Y Meusburger | 6 | 6

Semifinals
6 | (South Africa) C Scheepers | 2 | 2
(Austria) Y Meusburger | 6 | 6

=== Bottom half ===
First round
7 | (Spain) MT Torró Flor | 6 | 7
(Russia) N Bratchikova | 1 | 5
(Hungary) T Babos | 6 | 6^{4} | 6
(Serbia) A Krunić | 3 | 7^{7} | 3
(Czech Republic) S Záhlavová | 1 | 6 | 6^{4}
WC | (Hungary) Á Bukta | 6 | 4 | 7^{7}
(Kazakhstan) S Karatantcheva | 3 | 0
3 | (Romania) S Halep | 6 | 6
8 | (Georgia (country)) A Tatishvili | 6 | 6
WC | (Hungary) R-L Jani | 3 | 4
(Israel) S Pe'er | 6 | 6
(Switzerland) X Knoll | 2 | 2
(Romania) A Cadanțu | 6 | 6
(Austria) P Mayr-Achleitner | 0 | 1
(Czech Republic) A Hlaváčková | 6 | 6
2 | (France) A Cornet | 4 | 2

Second round
7 | (Spain) MT Torró Flor | 6 | 4 | 6^{4}
(Hungary) T Babos | 1 | 6 | 7^{7}
WC | (Hungary) Á Bukta | 1 | 1
3 | (Romania) S Halep | 6 | 6
8 | (Georgia (country)) A Tatishvili | 1 | 1
(Israel) S Pe'er | 6 | 6
(Romania) A Cadanțu | 4 | 7 | 4
(Czech Republic) A Hlaváčková | 6 | 5 | 0^{r}

Quarterfinals
(Hungary) T Babos | 5 | 1
3 | (Romania) S Halep | 7 | 6
(Israel) S Pe'er | 0 | 5
(Romania) A Cadanțu | 6 | 7

Semifinals
3 | (Romania) S Halep | 6 | 7^{7}
(Romania) A Cadanțu | 2 | 6^{1}
