= 2023 Ladies Open Vienna =

Tennis tournament

- Date: 4–10 September 2023
- Edition: 17th
- Category: ITF Women's World Tennis Tour
- Prize money: $60,000
- Surface: Clay / Outdoor
- Location: Vienna, Austria; 48.155897°N 16.318271°E

Champions

Singles
- (Croatia) Tena Lukas

Doubles
- (Romania) Irina Bara / (Poland) Weronika Falkowska
- Ladies Open Vienna

The 2023 Ladies Open Vienna was a professional tennis tournament played on outdoor clay courts. It was the seventeenth edition of the tournament, which was part of the 2023 ITF Women's World Tennis Tour. It took place in Vienna, Austria, between 4 and 10 September 2023.

== Champions ==
=== Singles ===
- (Croatia) Tena Lukas def. (Romania) Miriam Bulgaru, 7–5, 6–1

=== Doubles ===
- (Romania) Irina Bara / (Poland) Weronika Falkowska def. (Austria) Melanie Klaffner / (Austria) Sinja Kraus, 6–3, 2–6, [13–11]

== Singles main draw entrants ==
=== Seeds ===
Country	Player	Rank	Seed
HUN	Dalma Gálfi	116	1
UKR	Katarina Zavatska	188	2
UZB	Nigina Abduraimova	194	3
ESP	Leyre Romero Gormaz	197	4
AUT	Sinja Kraus	208	5
ROU	Irina Bara	214	6
ROU	Miriam Bulgaru	219	7
	Ekaterina Makarova	228	8

- Rankings are as of 28 August 2023.

=== Other entrants ===
The following players received wildcards into the singles main draw:

- (Austria) Melanie Klaffner
- (Austria) Arabella Koller
- (Austria) Tamara Kostic
- (Austria) Alina Michalitsch

The following players received entry into the singles main draw as special exempts:

- (Romania) Andreea Mitu
- (Croatia) Iva Primorac

The following players received entry from the qualifying draw:

- (Spain) Lucía Cortez Llorca
- (Romania) Ilona Georgiana Ghioroaie
- (Slovenia) Polona Hercog
- Victoria Kan
- (Germany) Tayisiya Morderger
- (Japan) Chihiro Muramatsu
- (Hungary) Amarissa Kiara Tóth
- (Slovakia) Emma Tóthová
