= 2012 Budapest Grand Prix =

- Date: 30 April – 5 May
- Edition: 17th
- Category: WTA International
- Draw: 32S / 16D
- Prize money: $220,000
- Surface: Clay / outdoor
- Venue: Római Tennis Academy

Champions

Singles
- (Italy) Sara Errani

Doubles
- (Slovakia) Janette Husárová / (Slovakia) Magdaléna Rybáriková
← 2011 ·	Budapest Grand Prix	· 2013 →

The 2012 Budapest Grand Prix was a women's tennis tournament played on outdoor clay courts. It was the 17th edition of the Budapest Grand Prix, an International-level tournament on the 2012 WTA Tour. It took place at the Római Tennis Academy in Budapest, Hungary, from 30 April through 5 May 2012. First-seeded Sara Errani won the singles title.

== Finals ==
=== Singles ===
(Italy) Sara Errani defeated (Russia) Elena Vesnina, 7–5, 6–4

- It was Errani's 3rd title of the year and 5th of her career, extending her clay winning streak to 15 matches.

=== Doubles ===
(Slovakia) Janette Husárová / (Slovakia) Magdaléna Rybáriková defeated (Czech Republic) Eva Birnerová / (Netherlands) Michaëlla Krajicek, 6–4, 6–2

== Singles main draw entrants ==
=== Seeds ===
Country	Player	Rank^{1}	Seed
ITA	Sara Errani	28	1
KAZ	Ksenia Pervak	38	2
BUL	Tsvetana Pironkova	42	3
CZE	Klára Zakopalová	45	4
NZL	Marina Erakovic	46	5
CRO	Petra Martić	51	6
ISR	Shahar Pe'er	54	7
ROU	Irina-Camelia Begu	56	8

- ^{1} Rankings are as of April 23, 2012

=== Other entrants ===
The following players received wildcards into the singles main draw:

- (Hungary) Csilla Borsányi
- (Hungary) Henrietta Habler
- (Hungary) Vanda Lukács

The following players received entry from the qualifying draw:

- (Uzbekistan) Akgul Amanmuradova
- (Hungary) Melinda Czink
- (Bosnia and Herzegovina) Mervana Jugić-Salkić
- (Bosnia and Herzegovina) Jasmina Tinjić

=== Withdrawals ===
- (Spain) María José Martínez Sánchez
- (Czech Republic) Lucie Šafářová

=== Retirements ===
- (Uzbekistan) Akgul Amanmuradova (right elbow injury)
- (United States) Varvara Lepchenko (right ankle injury)
- (Bosnia and Herzegovina) Jasmina Tinjić (difficulty breathing)

== Doubles main draw entrants ==
=== Seeds ===
Country	Player	Country	Player	Rank^{1}	Seed
RSA	Natalie Grandin	CZE	Vladimíra Uhlířová	45	1
NZL	Marina Erakovic	RUS	Elena Vesnina	60	2
UZB	Akgul Amanmuradova	POL	Alicja Rosolska	114	3
TPE	Chan Hao-ching	JPN	Rika Fujiwara	132	4

- ^{1} Rankings are as of April 23, 2012

=== Other entrants ===
The following pair received wildcard into the doubles main draw:

- (Hungary) Gréta Arn / (Hungary) Tímea Babos

=== Retirements ===
- (Hungary) Gréta Arn (neck injury)
- (New Zealand) Marina Erakovic (left abdominal injury)
