= 2024 Budapest Grand Prix – Singles =

Singles
- 2024 Budapest Grand Prix

Final
- Champion: Diana Shnaider
- Runner-up: Aliaksandra Sasnovich
- Score: 6–4, 6–4

Details
- Draw: 32
- Seeds: 8

Events
Singles	Doubles
- Budapest Grand Prix

Diana Shnaider defeated Aliaksandra Sasnovich in the final, 6–4, 6–4, to win the singles tennis title at the 2024 Budapest Grand Prix. It was her third WTA Tour title.

Maria Timofeeva was the defending champion, but lost to Sasnovich in the second round.

== Seeds ==
1. Diana Shnaider (champion)
2. (Bulgaria) Viktoriya Tomova (first round)
3. (China) Wang Xiyu (second round)
4. (Spain) Sara Sorribes Tormo (second round)
5. (Poland) Magdalena Fręch (first round)
6. (Argentina) Nadia Podoroska (first round)
7. (Japan) Moyuka Uchijima (first round, retired)
8. (France) Varvara Gracheva (first round)

== Draw ==
Key

- Q = Qualifier
- WC = Wild card
- LL = Lucky loser
- Alt = Alternate
- ITF = ITF entry
- PR = Protected ranking
- SR = Special ranking
- SE = Special exempt
- JE = Junior exempt
- JR = Junior Accelerator Programme entrant
- CO = College Accelerator Programme entrant
- NG = Next Gen Accelerator Program entrant
- w/o = Walkover
- r = Retired
- d = Defaulted

=== Finals ===
Semifinals
1	Diana Shnaider	6	6
(Germany) Eva Lys	3	3
(Slovakia) Anna Karolína Schmiedlová	3	6	5
Aliaksandra Sasnovich	6	3	7

Final
1	Diana Shnaider	6	6
Aliaksandra Sasnovich	4	4

=== Top half ===
First round
1	D Shnaider	6	3	6
WC	(Hungary) F Stollár	3	6	4
Q	E Makarova	6	6
WC	(Hungary) T Babos	3	1
(Serbia) O Danilović	6^{5}	4
(Hungary) A Bondár	7^{7}	6
LL	(Germany) E Seidel	6	1
7	(Japan) M Uchijima	1	0^{r}
3	(China) Xiy Wang	7^{7}	7
(Romania) A Todoni	6^{4}	5
(Slovakia) R Šramková	6	4	6
Q	(Romania) M Bulgaru	3	6	4
(Germany) T Korpatsch	5	6	2
(United States) B Pera	7	2	6
(Germany) E Lys	6	6
6	(Argentina) N Podoroska	3	0

Second round
1	D Shnaider	6	6
Q	E Makarova	3	3
(Hungary) A Bondár	5	5
LL	(Germany) E Seidel	7	7
3	(China) Xiy Wang	6^{4}	3
(Slovakia) R Šramková	7^{7}	6
(United States) B Pera	6^{6}	1^{r}
(Germany) E Lys	7^{8}	4

Quarterfinals
1	D Shnaider	6	6
LL	(Germany) E Seidel	4	2
(Slovakia) R Šramková	6	3	6^{5}
(Germany) E Lys	4	6	7^{7}

Semifinals
1	D Shnaider	6	6
(Germany) E Lys	3	3

=== Bottom half ===
First round
5	(Poland) M Fręch	6^{5}	4
E Avanesyan	7^{7}	6
(Spain) R Masarova	6	6
WC	(Hungary) N Szabanin	2	3
K Rakhimova	6	4	0
(Slovakia) AK Schmiedlová	3	6	6
Q	(Bulgaria) G Topalova	6	3	5
4	(Spain) S Sorribes Tormo	4	6	7
8	(France) V Gracheva	3	0
(Netherlands) S Lamens	6	6
Q	(France) C Monnet	6	6
Q	(Hungary) A Tóth	1	1
M Timofeeva	7	7^{7}
Q	(Switzerland) S Waltert	5	6^{3}
A Sasnovich	2	6	6
2	(Bulgaria) V Tomova	6	2	4

Second round
E Avanesyan	2	7	6
(Spain) R Masarova	6	5	1
(Slovakia) AK Schmiedlová	2	6	6
4	(Spain) S Sorribes Tormo	6	2	2
(Netherlands) S Lamens	6	6
Q	(France) C Monnet	4	0
M Timofeeva	3	4
A Sasnovich	6	6

Quarterfinals
E Avanesyan	6	3	2
(Slovakia) AK Schmiedlová	2	6	6
(Netherlands) S Lamens	4	6	4
A Sasnovich	6	2	6

Semifinals
(Slovakia) AK Schmiedlová	3	6	5
A Sasnovich	6	3	7

== Qualifying ==
=== Seeds ===
1. (Romania) Ana Bogdan (first round)
2. (Germany) Ella Seidel (qualifying competition, lucky loser)
3. (Croatia) Lucija Ćirić Bagarić (first round)
4. (Slovenia) Veronika Erjavec (first round)
5. Ekaterina Makarova (qualified)
6. (Ukraine) Kateryna Baindl (withdrew)
7. (Ukraine) Katarina Zavatska (qualifying competition, withdrew)
8. Julia Avdeeva (first round)
9. (France) Carole Monnet (qualified)
10. (Romania) Miriam Bulgaru (qualified)
11. (Croatia) Tena Lukas (qualifying competition, retired)
12. (Switzerland) Simona Waltert (qualified)

=== Qualifiers ===
1. (Romania) Miriam Bulgaru
2. (Bulgaria) Gergana Topalova
3. (France) Carole Monnet
4. (Hungary) Amarissa Tóth
5. Ekaterina Makarova
6. (Switzerland) Simona Waltert

=== Lucky loser ===
1. (Germany) Ella Seidel

=== Qualifying draw ===
==== First qualifier ====
First round
1	(Romania) Ana Bogdan	2	4
(Czech Republic) Anna Sisková	6	6
WC	(Hungary) Gréta Nemcsek	1	1
10	(Romania) Miriam Bulgaru	6	6

Qualifying competition
(Czech Republic) Anna Sisková	4	6	6^{3}
10	(Romania) Miriam Bulgaru	6	1	7^{7}

==== Second qualifier ====
First round
2	(Germany) Ella Seidel	7	7
(Serbia) Lola Radivojević	5	5
(Bulgaria) Gergana Topalova	6	6
8	Julia Avdeeva	3	1

Qualifying competition
2	(Germany) Ella Seidel	6	3	3
(Bulgaria) Gergana Topalova	3	6	6

==== Third qualifier ====
First round
3	(Croatia) Lucija Ćirić Bagarić	3	4
Alevtina Ibragimova	6	6
(Romania) Maria Sara Popa	4	2
9	(France) Carole Monnet	6	6

Qualifying competition
Alevtina Ibragimova	2	2
9	(France) Carole Monnet	6	6

==== Fourth qualifier ====
First round
4	(Slovenia) Veronika Erjavec	3	6	3
WC	(Hungary) Amarissa Tóth	6	3	6
WC	(Hungary) Melinda Bíró	4	1
11	(Croatia) Tena Lukas	6	6

Qualifying competition
WC	(Hungary) Amarissa Tóth	5	6	3
11	(Croatia) Tena Lukas	7	1	1^{r}

==== Fifth qualifier ====
First round
5	Ekaterina Makarova	6	6
(United Kingdom) Emily Appleton	3	2
(Czech Republic) Jesika Malečková	4	5
7	(Ukraine) Katarina Zavatska	6	7

Qualifying competition
5	Ekaterina Makarova	w/o
7	(Ukraine) Katarina Zavatska

==== Sixth qualifier ====
First round
Alt	(China) Tang Qianhui	7^{7}	6
Amina Anshba	6^{4}	4
(Ukraine) Anastasiya Soboleva	4	2
12	(Switzerland) Simona Waltert	6	6

Qualifying competition
Alt	(China) Tang Qianhui	1	4
12	(Switzerland) Simona Waltert	6	6
