= Lilla Barzó =

Hungarian tennis player

- Country (sports): Hungary
- Born: 2 September 1996 (age 28); Hungary
- Prize money: $14,430

Singles
- Career record: 61–30
- Career titles: 3 ITF
- Highest ranking: No. 435 (26 October 2015)

Doubles
- Career record: 10–9
- Career titles: 0
- Highest ranking: No. 704 (13 April 2015)

Lilla Barzó (born 2 September 1996) is a Hungarian former tennis player.

Barzó won three singles titles on the ITF Women's Circuit in her career. On 26 October 2015, she reached her best singles ranking of world No. 435. On 13 April 2015, she peaked at No. 704 in the WTA doubles rankings.

Barzó was given a wildcard for the 2013 Budapest Grand Prix, where she made her WTA Tour main-draw debut, alongside Dalma Gálfi in doubles, only to lose to the 2011 French Open doubles champions Andrea Hlaváčková and Lucie Hradecká.

Barzó played her last match on the ITF Circuit in March 2016.

After her retirement, she started to studying at the University of Szeged.

== ITF finals ==
=== Singles (3–2) ===
Outcome	No.	Date	Tournament	Surface	Opponent	Score
Winner	1.	27 October 2014	ITF Pereira, Colombia	Clay	(Chile) Andrea Koch Benvenuto	6–4, 6–2
Winner	2.	8 June 2015	ITF Antananarivo, Madagascar	Clay	(United States) Jaeda Daniel	7–5, 6–2
Runner-up	1.	29 June 2015	ITF Prokuplje, Serbia	Clay	(Australia) Alexandra Nancarrow	1–6, 6–3, 1–6
Winner	3.	20 July 2015	Tampere Open, Finland	Clay	(Denmark) Karen Barbat	6–2, 6–4
Runner-up	2.	12 October 2015	ITF Pula, Italy	Clay	(Hungary) Vanda Lukács	6–4, 5–7, 3–6

=== Doubles (0–2) ===
Outcome	No.	Date	Tournament	Surface	Partner	Opponents	Score
Runner-up	1.	18 August 2014	ITF Vinkovci, Croatia	Clay	(Hungary) Ágnes Bukta	(Croatia) Jana Fett (Croatia) Adrijana Lekaj	3–6, 5–7
Runner-up	2.	30 March 2015	ITF Pula, Italy	Clay	(Romania) Irina Bara	(Italy) Claudia Giovine (Belgium) Kimberley Zimmermann	6–7^{(4)}, 3–6
