= 2012 Budapest Grand Prix – Singles =

Singles
- 2012 Budapest Grand Prix

Final
- Champion: (Italy) Sara Errani
- Runner-up: (Russia) Elena Vesnina
- Score: 7–5, 6–4

Details
- Draw: 32
- Seeds: 8

Events
Singles	Doubles
- Budapest Grand Prix

Roberta Vinci was the defending champion, but decided to play at the Estoril Open instead.
First-seeded Sara Errani won the singles tournament, defeating Elena Vesnina in the final, 7–5, 6–4. With this win, Errani extended her clay court winning streak to 15.

== Seeds ==
1. (Italy) Sara Errani (champion)
2. (Kazakhstan) Ksenia Pervak (second round)
3. (Bulgaria) Tsvetana Pironkova (first round)
4. (Czech Republic) Klára Zakopalová (second round)
5. (New Zealand) Marina Erakovic (semifinals)
6. (Croatia) Petra Martić (quarterfinals)
7. (Israel) Shahar Pe'er (first round)
8. (Romania) Irina-Camelia Begu (first round)

== Draw ==
Key

- Q = Qualifier
- WC = Wild card
- LL = Lucky loser
- Alt = Alternate
- ITF = ITF entry
- PR = Protected ranking
- SR = Special ranking
- SE = Special exempt
- JE = Junior exempt
- JR = Junior Accelerator Programme entrant
- CO = College Accelerator Programme entrant
- NG = Next Gen Accelerator Program entrant
- w/o = Walkover
- r = Retired
- d = Defaulted

=== Finals ===
Semifinals
1	(Italy) Sara Errani	6	6
(Georgia (country)) Anna Tatishvili	2	1
5	(New Zealand) Marina Erakovic	2	4
(Russia) Elena Vesnina	6	6

Final
1	(Italy) Sara Errani	7	6
(Russia) Elena Vesnina	5	4

=== Top half ===
First round
1	(Italy) S Errani	6	6
(Luxembourg) M Minella	1	1
Q	(Hungary) M Czink	6^{3}	6	6
Q	(Bosnia and Herzegovina) M Jugić-Salkić	7^{7}	0	3
(Ukraine) L Tsurenko	3	6	6
(Hungary) G Arn	6	3	1
(Italy) A Brianti	6	5	6
8	(Romania) I-C Begu	4	7	3
3	(Bulgaria) T Pironkova	6	3	1
(Georgia (country)) A Tatishvili	1	6	6
WC	(Hungary) V Lukács	6	6
WC	(Hungary) H Habler	2	1
(Slovakia) M Rybáriková	2	1
(Romania) A Cadanțu	6	6
(Canada) A Wozniak	6	6
7	(Israel) S Pe'er	4	3

Second round
1	(Italy) S Errani	6	1	6
Q	(Hungary) M Czink	4	6	1
(Ukraine) L Tsurenko	7	5	4
(Italy) A Brianti	5	7	6
(Georgia (country)) A Tatishvili	6	6
WC	(Hungary) V Lukács	1	2
(Romania) A Cadanțu	7^{7}	0	0
(Canada) A Wozniak	6^{2}	6	6

Quarterfinals
1	(Italy) S Errani	6	6
(Italy) A Brianti	4	0
(Georgia (country)) A Tatishvili	5	7^{7}	6
(Canada) A Wozniak	7	6^{4}	4

Semifinals
1	(Italy) S Errani	6	6
(Georgia (country)) A Tatishvili	2	1

=== Bottom half ===
First round
5	(New Zealand) M Erakovic	7^{7}	3	7^{7}
(France) P Parmentier	6^{3}	6	6^{2}
(Netherlands) M Krajicek	3	6	6^{6}
Q	(Uzbekistan) A Amanmuradova	6	3	7^{8}
(Czech Republic) B Záhlavová-Strýcová	1	6
Q	(Bosnia and Herzegovina) J Tinjić	6	3^{r}
(United Kingdom) A Keothavong	6^{3}	6	2
4	(Czech Republic) K Zakopalová	7^{7}	3	6
6	(Croatia) P Martić	6	7
WC	(Hungary) C Borsányi	0	5
(Hungary) T Babos	7^{7}	4	1
(Chinese Taipei) S-w Hsieh	6^{4}	6	6
(United States) V Lepchenko	0^{r}
(Russia) E Vesnina	5
(Russia) V Dushevina	1	7	6^{6}
2	(Kazakhstan) K Pervak	6	5	7^{8}

Second round
5	(New Zealand) M Erakovic	6	0
Q	(Uzbekistan) A Amanmuradova	0	0^{r}
(Czech Republic) B Záhlavová-Strýcová	6	6
4	(Czech Republic) K Zakopalová	3	3
6	(Croatia) P Martić	6	6
(Chinese Taipei) S-w Hsieh	4	1
(Russia) E Vesnina	6	6
2	(Kazakhstan) K Pervak	2	3

Quarterfinals
5	(New Zealand) M Erakovic	6	1	6
(Czech Republic) B Záhlavová-Strýcová	2	6	4
6	(Croatia) P Martić	3	2
(Russia) E Vesnina	6	6

Semifinals
5	(New Zealand) M Erakovic	2	4
(Russia) E Vesnina	6	6

== Qualifying ==
=== Seeds ===
1. (Serbia) Bojana Jovanovski (first round)
2. (Czech Republic) Eva Birnerová (qualifying competition)
3. (Uzbekistan) Akgul Amanmuradova (qualified)
4. (Switzerland) Stefanie Vögele (first round)
5. (Hungary) Melinda Czink (qualified)
6. (Romania) Mihaela Buzărnescu (first round)
7. (Hungary) Réka-Luca Jani (first round)
8. (Bulgaria) Dia Evtimova (first round)

=== Qualifiers ===
1. (Hungary) Melinda Czink
2. (Bosnia and Herzegovina) Mervana Jugić-Salkić
3. (Uzbekistan) Akgul Amanmuradova
4. (Bosnia and Herzegovina) Jasmina Tinjić

=== Qualifying draw ===
==== First qualifier ====
First round
1	(Serbia) Bojana Jovanovski	2	6	4
(Slovakia) Romana Tabak	6	2	6
(France) Kristina Mladenovic	6	3	4
5	(Hungary) Melinda Czink	4	6	6

Qualifying competition
(Slovakia) Romana Tabak	2	2
5	(Hungary) Melinda Czink	6	6

==== Second qualifier ====
First round
2	(Czech Republic) Eva Birnerová	6	6
WC	(Hungary) Krisztina Kapitány	1	3
(Bosnia and Herzegovina) Mervana Jugić-Salkić	6	6
8	(Bulgaria) Dia Evtimova	2	3

Qualifying competition
2	(Czech Republic) Eva Birnerová	6^{3}	2
(Bosnia and Herzegovina) Mervana Jugić-Salkić	7^{7}	6

==== Third qualifier ====
First round
3	(Uzbekistan) Akgul Amanmuradova	6	6
WC	(Hungary) Vaszilisza Bulgakova	2	2
(Hungary) Katalin Marosi	6	6^{3}	6
7	(Hungary) Réka-Luca Jani	2	7^{7}	2

Qualifying competition
3	(Uzbekistan) Akgul Amanmuradova	6	1	7^{7}
(Hungary) Katalin Marosi	1	6	6^{4}

==== Fourth qualifier ====
First round
4	(Switzerland) Stefanie Vögele	6^{4}	6^{5}
(Japan) Rika Fujiwara	7^{7}	7^{7}
(Bosnia and Herzegovina) Jasmina Tinjić	6	6
6	(Romania) Mihaela Buzărnescu	4	1

Qualifying competition
(Japan) Rika Fujiwara	3	3
(Bosnia and Herzegovina) Jasmina Tinjić	6	6
