= Csilla Borsányi =

Hungarian tennis player

- Country (sports): Hungary
- Born: 2 August 1987 (age 37); Siófok, Hungary
- Height: 1.68 m (5 ft 6 in)
- Prize money: $13,152

Singles
- Career record: 49–46
- Career titles: 0
- Highest ranking: 701 (1 October 2012)

Doubles
- Career record: 27–14
- Career titles: 4 ITF
- Highest ranking: 552 (6 October 2014)

Csilla Borsányi (born 2 August 1987 in Siófok) is a Hungarian former tennis player. She attended University of Florida as a student athlete, and played for the gators for two seasons from August 2006 to May 2008. She continued her studies at Baylor University in Waco, Texas. Borsányi was the Newcomer of the year in the BIG XII Conference in 2009. She was on the team that became number one in Division I ranking in 2010 for the first time in Baylor History. She graduated in May 2011.

Borsányi won four doubles titles on the ITF Circuit. On 1 October 2012, she reached her best singles ranking of world No. 701. On 6 October 2014, she peaked at No. 552 in the doubles rankings.

Borsányi made her WTA Tour main-draw debut at the Budapest Grand Prix in 2006, and was awarded a wildcard to the 2012 Budapest Grand Prix.

== ITF Circuit finals ==
=== Doubles (4–2) ===
Legend $100,000 tournaments $75,000 tournaments $50,000 tournaments $25,000 tournaments $10,000 tournaments	Finals by surface Hard (1–1) Clay (1–1) Grass (0–0) Carpet (2–0)

Result	No.	Date	Tournament	Surface	Partner	Opponents	Score
Win	1.	30 May 2006	ITF Győr, Hungary	Clay	(Hungary) Virág Németh	(Slovakia) Nikola Vajdová (Slovakia) Patrícia Verešová	6–4, 6–4
Loss	1.	23 July 2012	ITF Palić, Serbia	Clay	(Hungary) Ágnes Bukta	(Slovakia) Karin Morgošová (Slovakia) Lenka Tvarošková	7–5, 4–6, [8–10]
Win	2.	4 November 2013	ITF Heraklion, Greece	Carpet	(Romania) Ilka Csöregi	(Ukraine) Maryna Kolb (Ukraine) Nadiya Kolb	4–6, 6–3, [11–9]
Win	3.	11 November 2013	ITF Heraklion, Greece	Carpet	(Romania) Ilka Csöregi	(Belgium) Steffi Distelmans (Australia) Nana Miyakawa	6–0, 6–1
Loss	2.	2 December 2013	ITF Sharm El Sheikh, Egypt	Hard	(Russia) Aminat Kushkhova	(United Kingdom) Harriet Dart (United Kingdom) Katy Dunne	6–0, 4–6, [4–10]
Win	4.	31 March 2014	ITF Heraklion, Greece	Hard	(Romania) Ilka Csöregi	(Greece) Valentini Grammatikopoulou (Russia) Polina Leykina	4–6, 6–3, [10–6]
