= 2012 Budapest Grand Prix – Doubles =

Doubles
- 2012 Budapest Grand Prix

Final
- Champions: (Slovakia) Janette Husárová (Slovakia) Magdaléna Rybáriková
- Runners-up: (Czech Republic) Eva Birnerová (Netherlands) Michaëlla Krajicek
- Score: 6–4, 6–2

Details
- Draw: 16
- Seeds: 4

Events
Singles	Doubles
- Budapest Grand Prix

Anabel Medina Garrigues and Alicja Rosolska were the defending champions but Medina Garrigues decided to participate at the Estoril Open instead.
Rosolska partnered up with Akgul Amanmuradova, but they lost in the first round to Katalin Marosi and Anna Tatishvili.
Janette Husárová and Magdaléna Rybáriková won the final over Eva Birnerová and Michaëlla Krajicek 6–4, 6–2.

== Seeds ==
1. (South Africa) Natalie Grandin / (Czech Republic) Vladimíra Uhlířová (quarterfinals)
2. (New Zealand) Marina Erakovic / (Russia) Elena Vesnina (quarterfinals, retired due to Erakovic's left abdominal injury)
3. (Uzbekistan) Akgul Amanmuradova / (Poland) Alicja Rosolska (first round)
4. (Chinese Taipei) Chan Hao-ching / (Japan) Rika Fujiwara (quarterfinals)

== Draw ==
Key

- Q = Qualifier
- WC = Wild card
- LL = Lucky loser
- Alt = Alternate
- ITF = ITF entry
- PR = Protected ranking
- SR = Special ranking
- SE = Special exempt
- JE = Junior exempt
- JR = Junior Accelerator Programme entrant
- CO = College Accelerator Programme entrant
- NG = Next Gen Accelerator Program entrant
- w/o = Walkover
- r = Retired
- d = Defaulted

=== Draw ===
First round
1	(South Africa) N Grandin (Czech Republic) V Uhlířová	6	6
(Australia) D Jeflea (France) S Lefèvre	1	3
(France) K Mladenovic (Kazakhstan) K Pervak	5	6	[7]
(Czech Republic) E Birnerová (Netherlands) M Krajicek	7	1	[10]
4	(Chinese Taipei) H-c Chan (Japan) R Fujiwara	w/o
WC	(Hungary) G Arn (Hungary) T Babos
(Romania) I-C Begu (Luxembourg) M Minella	2	6	[10]
(Bosnia and Herzegovina) M Jugić-Salkić (Austria) S Klemenschits	6	2	[7]
(Czech Republic) E Hrdinová (United Kingdom) A Keothavong	2	3
(Latvia) L Dekmeijere (Russia) M Kondratieva	6	6
(Hungary) K Marosi (Georgia (country)) A Tatishvili	7	7^{7}
3	(Uzbekistan) A Amanmuradova (Poland) A Rosolska	5	6^{5}
(Chinese Taipei) S-w Hsieh (Chinese Taipei) S-y Hsieh	7^{7}	2	[5]
(Slovakia) J Husárová (Slovakia) M Rybáriková	6^{5}	6	[10]
(Hungary) M Czink (Hungary) R-L Jani	1	4
2	(New Zealand) M Erakovic (Russia) E Vesnina	6	6

Quarterfinals
1	(South Africa) N Grandin (Czech Republic) V Uhlířová	1	2
(Czech Republic) E Birnerová (Netherlands) M Krajicek	6	6
4	(Chinese Taipei) H-c Chan (Japan) R Fujiwara	4	6	[6]
(Romania) I-C Begu (Luxembourg) M Minella	6	3	[10]
(Latvia) L Dekmeijere (Russia) M Kondratieva	6	0	[3]
(Hungary) K Marosi (Georgia (country)) A Tatishvili	4	6	[10]
(Slovakia) J Husárová (Slovakia) M Rybáriková	3
2	(New Zealand) M Erakovic (Russia) E Vesnina	4^{r}

Semifinals
(Czech Republic) E Birnerová (Netherlands) M Krajicek	6	6
(Romania) I-C Begu (Luxembourg) M Minella	0	3
(Hungary) K Marosi (Georgia (country)) A Tatishvili	6^{3}	6	[6]
(Slovakia) J Husárová (Slovakia) M Rybáriková	7^{7}	2	[10]

Final
(Czech Republic) E Birnerová (Netherlands) M Krajicek	4	2
(Slovakia) J Husárová (Slovakia) M Rybáriková	6	6
