= 2013 Budapest Grand Prix =

- Date: 8 – 14 July
- Edition: 18th
- Category: WTA International
- Draw: 32S / 8D
- Prize money: $235,000
- Surface: Clay
- Location: Budapest. Hungary
- Venue: Római Tennis Academy

Champions

Singles
- (Romania) Simona Halep

Doubles
- (Czech Republic) Andrea Hlaváčková / (Czech Republic) Lucie Hradecká
← 2012 ·	Budapest Grand Prix	· 2021 →

The 2013 Budapest Grand Prix was a women's tennis tournament played on outdoor clay courts. It was the 18th edition of the Budapest Grand Prix, an International-level tournament on the 2013 WTA Tour. It took place at the Római Tennis Academy in Budapest, Hungary, from 8 to 14 July 2013. The organisers decided to hold the tournament despite the recent floods in Hungary, but canceled the qualifying rounds (the top four alternates entered the main draw automatically) and reduced the doubles draw from 16 teams to eight. Third-seeded Simona Halep won the singles title.

== Finals ==
=== Singles ===
- (Romania) Simona Halep defeated (Austria) Yvonne Meusburger 6–3, 6–7^{(7–9)}, 6–1

=== Doubles ===
- (Czech Republic) Andrea Hlaváčková / (Czech Republic) Lucie Hradecká defeated (Russia) Nina Bratchikova / (Georgia (country)) Anna Tatishvili, 6–4, 6–1

== Singles main draw entrants ==
=== Seeds ===
Country	Player	Rank^{1}	Seed
CZE	Lucie Šafářová	30	1
FRA	Alizé Cornet	31	2
ROU	Simona Halep	32	3
GER	Annika Beck	54	4
SWE	Johanna Larsson	63	5
RSA	Chanelle Scheepers	67	6
ESP	María Teresa Torró Flor	75	7
GEO	Anna Tatishvili	78	8

- ^{1} Rankings are as of 24 June 2013

=== Other entrants ===
The following players received wildcards into the singles main draw:

- (Hungary) Ágnes Bukta
- (Hungary) Réka-Luca Jani
- (Hungary) Vanda Lukács

The following players received entry from the alternates list (qualifying was canceled to allow courts to recover from recent flooding):

- (Serbia) Aleksandra Krunić
- (Slovenia) Tadeja Majerič
- (Israel) Shahar Pe'er
- (Russia) Valeria Solovyeva

=== Withdrawals ===
Before the tournament

- (Slovakia) Jana Čepelová
- (Hungary) Melinda Czink
- (Greece) Eleni Daniilidou
- (Estonia) Kaia Kanepi
- (Switzerland) Romina Oprandi
- (Bulgaria) Tsvetana Pironkova
- (Spain) Carla Suárez Navarro

=== Retirements ===
- (Czech Republic) Andrea Hlaváčková

== Doubles main draw entrants ==
=== Seeds ===
Country	Player	Country	Player	Rank^{1}	Seed
CZE	Andrea Hlaváčková	CZE	Lucie Hradecká	11	1
HUN	Tímea Babos	POL	Alicja Rosolska	113	2

- ^{1} Rankings are as of 24 June 2013

=== Other entrants ===
The following pairs received wildcards into the doubles main draw:

- (Hungary) Lilla Barzó / (Hungary) Dalma Gálfi
- (Hungary) Ágnes Bukta / (Hungary) Réka-Luca Jani
