= Melinda Bíró =

Hungarian tennis player (born 2007)

- Country (sports): Hungary
- Born: 7 January 2007 (age 19) Kecskemét, Hungary
- Plays: Right-handed (two-handed backhand)
- Prize money: US $3,337

Melinda Bíró (born 7 January 2007) is a Hungarian professional tennis player. She achieved a career-high ITF junior combined ranking of No. 132 on 22 January 2024.

== Early life ==
Melinda Bíró was born in Kecskemét. She began playing tennis at the age of five, and currently trains at Gellért SE in Szeged.

== Junior career ==
In June 2024, she won the J100 event in Sobota, the biggest junior singles title of her career. Later that month, she and partner İrem Kurt won the doubles title at the J100 Head Cup in Bruchköbel.

== Professional career ==
In July 2023, she received a wildcard to enter the qualifying draw of the Budapest Grand Prix but failed to advance to the main draw. The following year in Budapest, she and compatriot Gréta Nemcsek received a wildcard for the doubles main draw but lost to Isabelle Haverlag and Christina Rosca in the first round.
