= Panna Bartha =

Hungarian tennis player (born 2004)

- Country (sports): Hungary
- Born: 14 May 2004 (age 21) Pécs, Hungary
- Plays: Right-handed
- College: Florida Atlantic
- Prize money: $14,874

Singles
- Career record: 33–31
- Career titles: 1 ITF
- Highest ranking: No. 849 (15 January 2024)
- Current ranking: No. 868 (15 July 2024)

Doubles
- Career record: 20–20
- Highest ranking: No. 724 (22 July 2024)
- Current ranking: No. 730 (15 July 2024)
- Last updated on: 17 July 2024.

Panna Bartha (born 14 May 2004) is a Hungarian tennis player. She has career-high WTA rankings of 849 in singles, attained on 15 January 2024, and 370 in doubles, achieved on 15 July 2024.

== Career ==
Bartha made her WTA Tour main-draw debut at the 2024 Budapest Grand Prix, where she received a wildcard into the doubles tournament.

Bartha played tennis in college. She played for Florida Atlantic University's Florida Atlantic Owls women's tennis team.

== ITF Circuit finals ==
=== Singles: 1 (1 titles, 0 runner-ups) ===
Legend W15 tournaments	Finals by surface Hard (0–0) Clay (1–0)

Result	W–L	Date	Tournament	Tier	Surface	Opponent	Score
Win	1–0	Jan 2023	Antalya, Turkey	W15	Clay	Daria Lodikova	2–6, 6–3, 6–3

=== Doubles: 4 (0 titles, 4 runner-ups) ===
Legend W15 tournaments	Finals by surface Hard (0–0) Clay (13–7)

Result	W–L	Date	Tournament	Tier	Surface	Partner	Opponents	Score
Loss	0–1	Aug 2022	Bad Waltersdorf, Austria	W15	Clay	(Romania) Ștefania Bojică	Ekaterina Ovcharenko (Czech Republic) Zdena Šafářová	1–6, 3–6
Loss	0–2	Dec 2023	Antalya, Turkey	W15	Clay	(Turkey) İlay Yörük	(Romania) Anastasia Safta; Rada Zolotareva	2–6, 0–6
Loss	0–3	May 2024	Bol, Croatia	W15	Clay	(Poland) Xenia Bandurowska	(Switzerland) Marie Mettraux (Netherlands) Stéphanie Visscher	4–6, 1–6
Loss	0–4	Jul 2024	Mogyoród, Hungary	W15	Clay	(Switzerland) Katerina Tsygourova	(Czech Republic) Kateřina Mandelíková (Slovakia) Ingrid Vojčináková	2–6, 5–7
