= Gréta Nemcsek =

Hungarian tennis player (born 2009)

- Country (sports): Hungary
- Residence: Budapest, Hungary
- Born: 23 June 2009 (age 15)
- Plays: Right-handed (two-handed backhand)
- Prize money: US $2,320

Gréta Nemcsek (born 23 June 2009) is a Hungarian professional tennis player. She has a career-high ITF junior combined ranking of No. 332, achieved on 8 July 2024.

== Early life ==
Gréta Nemcsek trains at Vasas SC in Budapest. Her older brother, Norbert, played collegiate tennis at the University of North Florida.

== Junior career ==
In January 2023, she reached the third round of the Petits As, but lost to eventual runner-up Giulia Safina Popa. In August 2023, she reached the quarterfinals of the Alfa TI Cup in Budapest as a wildcard. The following month, she won her first title at the Zürichsee Junior Open in Horgen.

In April 2024, she won back-to-back J30 singles titles at the Joke Systems Open in Güssing and the Viszlo Trans Cup in Székesfehérvár. She then won the J60 Technifibre Cup in Budapest and reached the final of the J60 Dyadora Trophy in Timișoara.

== Professional career ==
In July 2024, she and compatriot Melinda Bíró received a wildcard into the doubles main draw of the Budapest Grand Prix, but lost in the first round to Isabelle Haverlag and Christina Rosca.
