= Dorka Drahota-Szabó =

Hungarian tennis player

- Country (sports): Hungary
- Born: 31 January 2002 (age 24)
- Prize money: $23,263

Singles
- Career record: 70–57
- Career titles: 0
- Highest ranking: No. 656 (21 June 2021)

Doubles
- Career record: 34–31
- Career titles: 4 ITF
- Highest ranking: No. 547 (25 October 2021)

Dorka Drahota-Szabó (born 31 January 2002) is a Hungarian former tennis player.

Drahota-Szabó has career-high WTA rankings of 656 in singles, achieved June 2021, and 547 in doubles, set on 25 October 2021.

She made her WTA Tour main-draw debut at the 2021 Budapest Grand Prix, where she received a wildcard into the doubles tournament.

== ITF Circuit finals ==
=== Singles: 1 (runner-up) ===
Legend $15,000 tournaments	Finals by surface Clay (0–1)

Result	W–L	Date	Tournament	Tier	Surface	Opponent	Score
Loss	0–1	May 2019	ITF Saint-Palais-sur-Mer, France	W15	Clay	(Sweden) Caijsa Hennemann	6–3, 3–6, 6–7^{(6–8)}

=== Doubles: 6 (4 titles, 2 runner-ups) ===
Legend $25,000 tournaments $15,000 tournaments	Finals by surface Hard (0–1) Clay (4–1)

Result	W–L	Date	Tournament	Tier	Surface	Partner	Opponents	Score
Loss	0–1	Oct 2018	ITF Ashkelon, Israel	W15	Hard	(Hungary) Adrienn Nagy	(Russia) Anastasia Pribylova (Russia) Anna Pribylova	5–7, 4–6
Win	1–1	Dec 2019	ITF Heraklion, Greece	W15	Clay	(Slovakia) Laura Svatíková	(Israel) Lina Glushko (Croatia) Oleksandra Oliynykova	6–2, 6–4
Loss	1–2	Sep 2020	ITF Otočec, Slovenia	W15	Clay	(Hungary) Adrienn Nagy	(Slovenia) Tina Cvetkovič (Slovenia) Pia Lovrič	3–6, 1–6
Win	2–2	Feb 2021	ITF Antalya, Turkey	W15	Clay	(Sweden) Caijsa Hennemann	(Russia) Polina Bakhmutima (Russia) Eva Garkusha	6–2, 6–1
Win	3–2	Oct 2021	ITF Budapest, Hungary	W25	Clay	(Sweden) Caijsa Hennemann	(Hungary) Adrienn Nagy (Hungary) Natália Szabanin	w/o
Win	4–2	Oct 2021	ITF Antalya, Turkey	W15	Clay	(Hungary) Amarissa Tóth	(Slovakia) Romana Čisovská (Hungary) Adrienn Nagy	6–3, 2–6, [10–4]

== ITF Junior Circuit finals ==
Legend
Category G3
Category G4
Category G5

=== Singles (0–2) ===
Result	Date	Tournament	Grade	Surface	Opponent	Score
Loss	Jan 2018	Belgrade, Serbia	G4	Hard	(Belarus) Jana Kolodynska	3–6, 3–6
Loss	May 2018	Budapest, Hungary	G4	Clay	(Hungary) Zita Kovács	6–4, 2–6, 4–6

=== Doubles (1–0) ===
Result	Date	Tournament	Grade	Surface	Partner	Opponents	Score
Win	Dec 2017	Luque, Paraguay	G5	Clay	(Argentina) Natalia Aruj	(Brazil) Lorena Medeiros Cardoso (Chile) Maria Yapur	w/o
