= Rebeka Stolmár =

Hungarian tennis player

- Country (sports): Hungary
- Born: 26 February 1997 (age 28)
- Plays: Right-handed
- Prize money: $33,869

Singles
- Career record: 108–88
- Career titles: 1 ITF
- Highest ranking: No. 513 (17 October 2022)

Doubles
- Career record: 81–44
- Career titles: 7 ITF
- Highest ranking: No. 431 (23 May 2016)

Rebeka Stolmár (born 26 February 1997) is a Hungarian former tennis player.

Stolmár has a career-high singles ranking by the WTA of 513, achieved on 17 October 2022, and a best WTA doubles ranking of 431, reached on 23 May 2016. In her career, she won one singles title and seven doubles titles on the ITF Circuit.

Stolmár made her WTA Tour main-draw debut at the 2023 Budapest Grand Prix, after receiving a wildcard for the doubles tournament. She competed her last singles match in July 2023, and is not ranked any more.

== ITF Circuit finals ==
Legend
$60,000 tournaments
$25,000 tournaments
$15,000 tournaments

=== Singles: 2 (1 title, 1 runner-up) ===
Result	W–L	Date	Tournament	Tier	Surface	Opponent	Score
Win	1–0	Nov 2021	ITF Monastir, Tunisia	15,000	Hard	(France) Océane Babel	6–4, 5–7, 6–4
Loss	1–1	Apr 2022	ITF Monastir, Tunisia	15,000	Hard	(Chinese Taipei) Joanna Garland	5–7, 1–6

=== Doubles: 18 (7 titles, 11 runner-ups) ===
Result	W-L	Date	Tournament	Tier	Surface	Partner	Opponents	Score
Loss	0–1	Feb 2015	ITF Antalya, Turkey	15,000	Clay	(Hungary) Vanda Lukács	(Japan) Miki Miyamura (Japan) Aiko Yoshitomi	1–6, 6–7^{(4)}
Win	1–1	Jun 2015	ITF Bol, Croatia	15,000	Clay	(Hungary) Szabina Szlavikovics	(Bosnia and Herzegovina) Dea Herdželaš (Slovakia) Barbara Kötelešová	7–6^{(5)}, 6–0
Win	2–1	Jun 2015	ITF Telavi, Georgia	10,000	Clay	(Hungary) Szabina Szlavikovics	(Italy) Federica Arcidiacono (Italy) Martina Spigarelli	6–2, 6–2
Loss	2–2	Sep 2015	ITF Bol, Croatia	10,000	Clay	(Hungary) Anna Bondár	(Croatia) Adrijana Lekaj (Croatia) Silvia Njirić	4–6, 5–7
Loss	2–3	Oct 2015	ITF Antalya, Turkey	10,000	Hard	(Hungary) Anna Bondár	(Romania) Nicoleta Dascălu (Romania) Andreea Ghițescu	4–6, 6–3, [5–10]
Win	3–3	Oct 2015	ITF Antalya, Turkey	10,000	Hard	(Hungary) Anna Bondár	(Romania) Daiana Negreanu (Spain) Cristina Sánchez Quintanar	6–1, 2–6, [10–5]
Loss	3–4	Oct 2015	ITF Antalya, Turkey	10,000	Hard	(Hungary) Anna Bondár	(Germany) Anna Klasen (Germany) Charlotte Klasen	4–6, 4–6
Loss	3–5	Nov 2015	ITF Antalya, Turkey	10,000	Clay	(Hungary) Anna Bondár	(Hungary) Ágnes Bukta (Slovakia) Vivien Juhászová	5–7, 3–6
Win	4–5	Nov 2015	ITF Antalya, Turkey	10,000	Clay	(Hungary) Anna Bondár	(Georgia (country)) Sofia Kvatsabaia (Germany) Julyette Steur	2–6, 6–4, [10–2]
Loss	4–6	Apr 2016	ITF Győr, Hungary	10,000	Clay	(Romania) Daiana Negreanu	(Argentina) Guadalupe Pérez Rojas (United Kingdom) Francesca Stephenson	4–6, 6–2, [6–10]
Win	5–6	Apr 2016	ITF Győr, Hungary	10,000	Clay	(Romania) Daiana Negreanu	(Ukraine) Maryna Kolb (Ukraine) Nadiia Kolb	7–6^{(4)}, 6–0
Loss	5–7	Oct 2016	ITF Bol, Croatia	10,000	Clay	(Slovenia) Nina Potočnik	(Croatia) Tena Lukas (Croatia) Iva Primorac	3–6, 4–6
Win	6–7	Oct 2016	ITF Bol, Croatia	10,000	Clay	(Croatia) Mariana Dražić	(Croatia) Lea Bošković (Norway) Malene Helgo	7–6^{(5)}, 7–6^{(5)}
Loss	6–8	Oct 2021	ITF Sharm El Sheikh, Egypt	15,000	Hard	(India) Ashmitha Easwaramurthi	(China) Bai Zhuoxuan (Thailand) Punnin Kovapitukted	0–6, 4–6
Win	7–8	Oct 2021	ITF Monastir, Tunisia	15,000	Hard	(Japan) Mana Ayukawa	(China) Ma Yexin (China) Ni Ma Zhuoma	6–3, 6–4
Loss	7–9	Apr 2022	ITF Monastir, Tunisia	15,000	Hard	(France) Victoria Muntean	(China) Wang Meiling (China) Yao Xinxin	2–6, 6–4, [3–10]
Loss	7–10	Jun 2022	ITF Ra'anana, Israel	25,000	Hard	(Japan) Chihiro Muramatsu	(Chinese Taipei) Lee Ya-hsuan (Chinese Taipei) Wu Fang-hsien	3–6, 1–6
Loss	7–11	Oct 2022	ITF Sozopol, Bulgaria	25,000	Hard	(Romania) Ilona Georgiana Ghioroaie	Irina Khromacheva (Estonia) Elena Malõgina	6–7^{(3)}, 2–6
