= Dimitra Pavlou =

Greek tennis player (born 2004)

- Country (sports): Greece
- Born: 21 April 2004 (age 22) Athens, Greece
- Plays: Right (two-handed backhand)
- Coach: Milana Spremo
- Prize money: $64,331

Singles
- Career record: 114–100
- Career titles: 4 ITF
- Highest ranking: No. 410 (27 November 2023)

Doubles
- Career record: 92–54
- Career titles: 7 ITF
- Highest ranking: No. 362 (5 August 2024)

Team competitions
- Fed Cup: 0–4
- Last updated on: 6 July 2026.

Dimitra Pavlou (Greek: Δήμητρα Παύλου, born 21 April 2004) is a Greek tennis player.

Pavlou has a career-high singles ranking of world No. 410, achieved on 27 November 2023. She also has a career-high doubles ranking by the WTA of 362, reached on 5 August 2024. So far, she has won three singles and seven doubles title on the ITF Circuit.

Pavlou also has represented Greece in the Fed Cup with a win/loss record of 0–4.

== ITF Circuit finals ==
=== Singles: 6 (4 titles, 2 runner-ups) ===
Legend W25 tournaments W15 tournaments	Finals by surface Clay (4–2)

Result	W–L	Date	Tournament	Tier	Surface	Opponents	Score
Loss	0–1	May 2022	ITF Heraklion, Greece	W15	Clay	(Serbia) Lola Radivojević	3–6, 1–6
Win	1–1	June 2023	ITF Kuršumlijska Banja, Serbia	W25	Clay	(Romania) Cristina Dinu	6–3, 2–6, 6–4
Win	2–1	Oct 2023	ITF Šibenik, Croatia	W15	Clay	(Serbia) Jana Bojović	7–5, 6–4
Win	3–1	Apr 2024	ITF Kuršumlijska Banja, Serbia	W15	Clay	(Serbia) Anja Stanković	4–6, 6–3, 6–1
Loss	3–2	Nov 2024	ITF Heraklion, Greece	W15	Clay	(Romania) Ilinca Amariei	6–3, 4–6, 4–6
Win	4–2	Nov 2024	ITF Heraklion, Greece	W15	Clay	(Greece) Sapfo Sakellaridi	6–4, 6–4

=== Doubles: 15 (7 titles, 8 runner-ups) ===
Legend W25/35 tournaments W15 tournaments	Finals by surface Hard (0–2) Clay (7–6)

Result	W–L	Date	Tournament	Tier	Surface	Partner	Opponents	Score
Loss	0–1	Nov 2020	ITF Heraklion, Greece	W15	Clay	(Russia) Elina Nepliy	(Romania) Andreea Roșca (Romania) Ioana Loredana Roșca	3–6, 3–6
Win	1–1	Nov 2021	ITF Heraklion, Greece	W15	Clay	(Greece) Eleni Christofi	(Italy) Giorgia Pinto (Japan) Risa Ushijima	6–3, 7–6^{(8)}
Win	2–1	May 2022	ITF Heraklion, Greece	W15	Clay	(Greece) Michaela Laki	(Czech Republic) Ivana Šebestová (Germany) Franziska Sziedat	6–4, 7–6^{(3)}
Win	3–1	Aug 2022	ITF Cairo, Egypt	W15	Clay	(Egypt) Yasmin Ezzat	(Sweden) Vanessa Ersöz (Ukraine) Anastasiia Poplavska	6–4, 2–6, [12–10]
Win	4–1	Aug 2022	ITF Cairo, Egypt	W15	Clay	(Egypt) Yasmin Ezzat	Elena Pridankina; Elizaveta Shebekina	7–5, 6–3
Win	5–1	Sep 2022	ITF Cairo, Egypt	W15	Clay	(Egypt) Yasmin Ezzat	(Japan) Mayuka Aikawa (China) Gao Xinyu	6–2, 6–0
Loss	5–2	Oct 2022	ITF Heraklion, Greece	W15	Clay	(Romania) Simona Ogescu	(Germany) Silvia Ambrosio (Czech Republic) Ivana Šebestová	5–7, 5–7
Win	6–2	Mar 2023	ITF Heraklion, Greece	W15	Clay	(Greece) Eleni Christofi	(Romania) Anastasia Safta (Romania) Lavinia Tănăsie	7–5, 6–2
Loss	6–3	Aug 2023	ITF Osijek, Croatia	W25	Clay	(Germany) Luisa Meyer auf der Heide	(Romania) Ilona Georgiana Ghioroaie (Hungary) Amarissa Tóth	2–6, 4–6
Loss	6–4	Feb 2024	ITF Antalya, Turkey	W35	Clay	(Greece) Martha Matoula	(Spain) Ángela Fita Boluda (Latvia) Daniela Vismane	1–6, 3–6
Loss	6–5	July 2024	ITF Kuršumlijska Banja, Serbia	W15	Clay	(Serbia) Anja Stanković	(Latvia) Kamilla Bartone (Czech Republic) Darja Viďmanová	4–6, 2–6
Loss	6–6	Aug 2024	ITF Monastir, Tunisia	W15	Hard	(Slovakia) Alica Rusová	(Japan) Hiromi Abe (Japan) Nanari Katsumi	2–6, 4–6
Loss	6–7	Aug 2024	ITF Monastir, Tunisia	W15	Hard	(Turkey) Leyla Nilüfer Elmas	(Japan) Hiromi Abe (Japan) Haine Ogata	0–6, 4–6
Win	7–7	Nov 2024	ITF Heraklion, Greece	W15	Clay	(Greece) Sapfo Sakellaridi	(Belgium) Tilwith Di Girolami (Lithuania) Patricija Paukštytė	2–1 ret.
Loss	7–8	Mar 2025	ITF Heraklion, Greece	W15	Clay	(Greece) Marianne Argyrokastriti	(Latvia) Margarita Ignatjeva (Greece) Elena Korokozidi	4–6, 2–6
