= Budapest Grand Prix =

WTA Tour
- Event name: Budapest Grand Prix
- Founded: 1996; 30 years ago
- Abolished: 2024
- Location: Budapest, Hungary
- Venue: Római Teniszakadémia
- Category: WTA 250
- Surface: Clay - outdoors
- Draw: 32S / 24Q / 16D
- Prize money: $267,082 (2024)
- Website: Website

Current champions (2024)
- Singles: Diana Shnaider
- Doubles: (Poland) Katarzyna Piter (Hungary) Fanny Stollár

The Hungarian Grand Prix (previously Budapest Grand Prix) was a women's tennis tournament held in Budapest, Hungary. It was a WTA 250 tournament played on the WTA Tour on outdoor clay court since 1996.

The tournament was formerly known as Poli-Farbe Budapest Grand Prix, Gaz de France Grand Prix, GDF Suez Grand Prix, Tippmix Budapest Grand Prix, Colortex Budapest Grand Prix, Westel 900 Budapest Open, Budapest Lotto Open, Budapest Open, and Budapest Grand Prix.

The event was replaced in the 2014 WTA Tour with a new tournament Bucharest Open held in Bucharest, Romania. It returned in 2021 as the Hungarian Grand Prix. In 2025 it was again replaced by the Iași Open on the WTA Tour calendar.

== Past finals ==
=== Singles ===
Year	Champion	Runner-up	Score
1996	(Romania) Ruxandra Dragomir	(Austria) Melanie Schnell	7–6^{(8–6)}, 6–1
1997	(South Africa) Amanda Coetzer	(Belgium) Sabine Appelmans	6–1, 6–3
1998	(Spain) Virginia Ruano Pascual	(Italy) Silvia Farina Elia	6–4, 4–6, 6–3
1999	(France) Sarah Pitkowski	(Spain) Cristina Torrens Valero	6–2, 6–2
2000	(Italy) Tathiana Garbin	(Netherlands) Kristie Boogert	6–2, 7–6^{(7–4)}
2001	(Bulgaria) Magdalena Maleeva	(Luxembourg) Anne Kremer	3–6, 6–2, 6–4
2002	(Germany) Martina Müller	(Switzerland) Myriam Casanova	6–2, 3–6, 6–4
2003	(Spain) Magüi Serna	(Australia) Alicia Molik	3–6, 7–5, 6–4
2004	(Serbia and Montenegro) Jelena Janković	(Slovakia) Martina Suchá	7–6^{(7–4)}, 6–3
2005	(Israel) Anna Smashnova	(Colombia) Catalina Castaño	6–2, 6–2
2006	(Israel) Anna Smashnova (2)	(Spain) Lourdes Domínguez	6–1, 6–3
2007	(Argentina) Gisela Dulko	(Romania) Sorana Cîrstea	6–7^{(7–2)}, 6–2, 6–2
2008	(France) Alizé Cornet	(Slovenia) Andreja Klepač	7–6^{(7–5)}, 6–3
2009	(Hungary) Ágnes Szávay	(Switzerland) Patty Schnyder	2–6, 6–4, 6–2
2010	(Hungary) Ágnes Szávay (2)	(Switzerland) Patty Schnyder	6–2, 6–4
2011	(Italy) Roberta Vinci	(Romania) Irina-Camelia Begu	6–4, 1–6, 6–4
2012	(Italy) Sara Errani	(Russia) Elena Vesnina	7–5, 6–4
2013	(Romania) Simona Halep	(Austria) Yvonne Meusburger	6–3, 6–7^{(7–9)}, 6–1
2014–2020	not held		
2021	(Kazakhstan) Yulia Putintseva	(Ukraine) Anhelina Kalinina	6–4, 6–0
2022	(United States) Bernarda Pera	(Serbia) Aleksandra Krunić	6–3, 6–3
2023	Maria Timofeeva	(Ukraine) Kateryna Baindl	6–3, 3–6, 6–0
2024	Diana Shnaider	Aliaksandra Sasnovich	6–4, 6–4

=== Doubles ===
Year	Champions	Runners-up	Score
1996	(United States) Katrina Adams (United States) Debbie Graham	(Czech Republic) Radka Bobková (Czech Republic) Eva Melicharová	6–3, 7–6^{3}
1997	(South Africa) Amanda Coetzer (France) Alexandra Fusai	(Czech Republic) Eva Martincová (Germany) Elena Wagner	6–3, 6–1
1998	(Spain) Virginia Ruano Pascual (Argentina) Paola Suárez	(Romania) Cătălina Cristea (Argentina) Laura Montalvo	4–6, 6–1, 6–1
1999	(Russia) Evgenia Kulikovskaya (Serbia and Montenegro) Sandra Načuk	(Argentina) Laura Montalvo (Spain) Virginia Ruano Pascual	6–3, 6–4
2000	(Bulgaria) Lubomira Bacheva (Spain) Cristina Torrens Valero	(Croatia) Jelena Kostanić Tošić (Serbia and Montenegro) Sandra Načuk	6–0, 6–2
2001	(Slovakia) Janette Husárová (Italy) Tathiana Garbin	(Hungary) Zsófia Gubacsi (Serbia and Montenegro) Dragana Zarić	6–1, 6–3
2002	(France) Émilie Loit (Australia) Catherine Barclay-Reitz	(Russia) Elena Bovina (Hungary) Zsófia Gubacsi	4–6, 6–3, 6–3
2003	(Hungary) Petra Mandula (Ukraine) Elena Tatarkova	(Spain) Conchita Martínez Granados (Ukraine) Tatiana Perebiynis	6–3, 6–1
2004	(Hungary) Petra Mandula (2) (Austria) Barbara Schett	(Hungary) Ágnes Szávay (Hungary) Virág Németh	6–3, 6–2
2005	(France) Émilie Loit (2) (Slovenia) Katarina Srebotnik	(Spain) Lourdes Domínguez Lino (Spain) Marta Marrero	6–1, 3–6, 6–2
2006	(Slovakia) Janette Husárová (2) (Netherlands) Michaëlla Krajicek	(Czech Republic) Lucie Hradecká (Czech Republic) Renata Voráčová	4–6, 6–4, 6–4
2007	(Hungary) Ágnes Szávay (Czech Republic) Vladimíra Uhlířová	(Germany) Martina Müller (Czech Republic) Gabriela Navrátilová	7–5, 6–2
2008	(France) Alizé Cornet (Slovakia) Janette Husárová (3)	(Germany) Vanessa Henke (Romania) Raluca Olaru	6–7^{(5–7)}, 6–1, [10–6]
2009	(Russia) Alisa Kleybanova (Romania) Monica Niculescu	(Ukraine) Alona Bondarenko (Ukraine) Kateryna Bondarenko	6–4, 7–6^{(7–5)}
2010	(Switzerland) Tímea Bacsinszky (Italy) Tathiana Garbin (2)	(Romania) Sorana Cîrstea (Spain) Anabel Medina Garrigues	6–3, 6–3
2011	(Spain) Anabel Medina Garrigues (Poland) Alicja Rosolska	(South Africa) Natalie Grandin (Czech Republic) Vladimíra Uhlířová	6–2, 6–2
2012	(Slovakia) Janette Husárová (4) (Slovakia) Magdaléna Rybáriková	(Czech Republic) Eva Birnerová (Netherlands) Michaëlla Krajicek	6–4, 6–2
2013	(Czech Republic) Andrea Hlaváčková (Czech Republic) Lucie Hradecká	(Russia) Nina Bratchikova (Georgia (country)) Anna Tatishvili	6–4, 6–1
2014–2020	not held		
2021	(Romania) Mihaela Buzărnescu (Hungary) Fanny Stollár	(Spain) Aliona Bolsova (Germany) Tamara Korpatsch	6–4, 6–4
2022	(Georgia (country)) Ekaterine Gorgodze (Georgia (country)) Oksana Kalashnikova	(Poland) Katarzyna Piter (Belgium) Kimberley Zimmermann	1–6, 6–4, [10–6]
2023	(Poland) Katarzyna Piter (Hungary) Fanny Stollár (2)	(United States) Jessie Aney (Czech Republic) Anna Sisková	6–2, 4–6, [10–4]
2024	(Poland) Katarzyna Piter (2) (Hungary) Fanny Stollár (3)	(Kazakhstan) Anna Danilina; Irina Khromacheva	6–3, 3–6, [10–3]

== See also ==
- List of tennis tournaments
- Hungarian Ladies Open
- Hungarian Pro Circuit Ladies Open
- Stella Artois Clay Court Championships
- Budapest Challenger (September)
- Budapest Challenger (May)
