= Natália Szabanin =

Hungarian tennis player (born 2003)

- Country (sports): Hungary
- Born: 11 October 2003 (age 22)
- Prize money: $68,052

Singles
- Career record: 86–65
- Career titles: 4 ITF
- Highest ranking: No. 245 (28 November 2022)

Doubles
- Career record: 31–27
- Career titles: 3 ITF
- Highest ranking: No. 435 (6 November 2023)

Natália Szabanin (born 11 October 2003) is a Hungarian former tennis player.

Szabanin reached career-high WTA rankings of 245 in singles, achieved on 28 November 2022, and 435 in doubles, set on 6 November 2023.

She made her WTA Tour main-draw debut at the 2021 Budapest Grand Prix where she received a wildcard into the doubles tournament. At the 2022 Budapest Grand Prix, Szabanin made her singles tour–level debut, after receiving wildcard losing in the first round to second seed Martina Trevisan, in three sets.

== ITF Circuit finals ==
=== Singles: 7 (4 titles, 3 runner-ups) ===
Legend W25/35 tournaments W15 tournaments	Finals by surface Hard (0–3) Clay (4–0)

Result	W–L	Date	Tournament	Tier	Surface	Opponent	Score
Win	1–0	Jun 2022	ITF Prokuplje, Serbia	W25	Clay	(Croatia) Tara Würth	6–4, 7–6^{(5)}
Win	2–0	Jul 2022	ITF Den Haag, Netherlands	W25	Clay	(Belgium) Magali Kempen	7–6^{(3)}, 6–4
Win	3–0	Sep 2022	ITF Vienna, Austria	W25	Clay	(Croatia) Tena Lukas	7–5, 6–3
Loss	3–1	Nov 2022	Trnava Indoor, Slovakia	W25	Hard (i)	(Croatia) Jana Fett	3–6, 2–6
Loss	3–2	Feb 2024	ITF Manacor, Spain	W15	Hard	(Denmark) Rebecca Munk Mortensen	4–6, 6–4, 6–7^{(5)}
Loss	3–3	Feb 2024	ITF Manacor, Spain	W15	Hard	(Spain) Kaitlin Quevedo	2–6, 1–3 ret.
Win	4–3	Aug 2024	ITF Duffel, Belgium	W35	Clay	(Germany) Katharina Hobgarski	7–6^{(3)}, 3–6, 6–0

=== Doubles: 5 (3 titles, 2 runner-ups) ===
Legend W25 tournaments W15 tournaments	Finals by surface Hard (1–1) Clay (2–1)

Result	W–L	Date	Tournament	Tier	Surface	Partner	Opponents	Score
Win	1–0	May 2021	ITF Šibenik, Croatia	W15	Clay	(Croatia) Petra Marčinko	(Russia) Darya Astakhova (Russia) Ekaterina Makarova	6–4, 6–3
Win	2–0	May 2021	ITF Šibenik, Croatia	W15	Clay	(Croatia) Petra Marčinko	(Bosnia and Herzegovina) Nefisa Berberović (Italy) Nicole Fossa Huergo	6–4, 3–6, [10–4]
Loss	2–1	Oct 2021	ITF Budapest, Hungary	W25	Clay	(Hungary) Adrienn Nagy	(Hungary) Dorka Drahota-Szabó (Sweden) Caijsa Hennemann	w/o
Loss	2–2	Nov 2021	ITF Helsingborg, Sweden	W15	Hard (i)	(Russia) Tatiana Barkova	(Germany) Anna Klasen (Germany) Phillippa Preugschat	6–1, 3–6, [9–11]
Win	3–2	Oct 2023	ITF Loulé, Portugal	W25	Hard	(Czech Republic) Dominika Šalková	Daria Khomutsianskaya; Evialina Laskevich	4–6, 6–2, [10–1]

== Head-to-head record ==
=== Top 5 highest rank wins ===
#	Tournament	Tier	Start date	Surface	Rd	Opponent	Rank	Score	NSzR
1	Budapest Open, Hungary	WTA 125	19 September 2022	Clay	1R	(Hungary) Panna Udvardy	No. 83	6–4, 6–1	No. 287
2	Vienna, Austria	W25	29 August 2022	Clay	F	(Croatia) Tena Lukas	No. 205	7–5, 6–3	No. 346
3	Den Haag, Netherlands	W25	27 June 2022	Clay	SF	(Argentina) Nadia Podoroska	No. 212	7–6^{(3)}, 6–4	No. 700
4	Budapest, Hungary	W25	27 September 2021	Clay	2R	(Chile) Daniela Seguel	No. 221	6–2, 6–2	No. 1,280
5	Lousada, Portugal	W25	27 November 2023	Hard (i)	1R	(Netherlands) Lesley Pattinama Kerkhove	No. 229	6–1, 7–6^{(4)}	No. 648
