= Amarissa Tóth =

Hungarian tennis player (born 2003)

- Full name: Amarissa Kiara Tóth
- Country (sports): Hungary
- Born: 10 February 2003 (age 23)
- Plays: Right-handed
- Prize money: $129,783

Singles
- Career record: 193–107
- Career titles: 8 ITF
- Highest ranking: No. 236 (2 March 2026)
- Current ranking: No. 456 (26 October 2026)

Doubles
- Career record: 126–58
- Career titles: 16 ITF
- Highest ranking: No. 264 (3 October 2022)
- Current ranking: No. 344 (26 October 2026)

Team competitions
- BJK Cup: 6–4
- Last updated on: 26 October 2026.

Amarissa Kiara Tóth (born 10 February 2003) is a Hungarian tennis player.

Tóth has career-high WTA rankings of 236 in singles, achieved on 2 March 2026, and 264 in doubles, reached in October 2022.

She made her WTA Tour main-draw debut at the 2021 Budapest Grand Prix, where she received a wildcard into the doubles tournament.

During her round of 32 match at the 2023 Budapest Grand Prix against Zhang Shuai, Tóth erased a ball mark after Zhang's shot was called out by the umpire despite repeated calls by Zhang for Tóth to not smear the mark. Zhang insisted the shot was in, which seemed to be the case, and retired from the match shortly after the incident, citing a severe panic attack. Tóth was condemned by many players and fans alike for her allegedly unsportsmanlike behavior. A few days after the incident, Tóth apologized for her actions.

== ITF Circuit finals ==
=== Singles: 12 (8 titles, 4 runner-ups) ===
Legend W75 tournaments W50 tournaments W35 tournaments W15 tournaments	Finals by surface Clay (8–4)

Result	W–L	Date	Tournament	Tier	Surface	Opponent	Score
Loss	0–1	Oct 2021	ITF Antalya, Turkey	W15	Clay	(United Kingdom) Sonay Kartal	5–7, 5–7
Win	1–1	Aug 2022	ITF Kottingbrunn, Austria	W15	Clay	(Germany) Carolina Kuhl	6–3, 7–5
Loss	1–2	Dec 2022	ITF Antalya, Turkey	W15	Clay	(Ukraine) Anastasiya Soboleva	4–6, 6–2, 3–6
Win	2–2	Dec 2023	ITF Antalya, Turkey	W15	Clay	(Serbia) Jana Bojović	6–1, 6–2
Win	3–2	Dec 2023	ITF Antalya, Turkiye	W15	Clay	(Serbia) Jana Bojović	6–2, 6–0
Win	4–2	Jan 2024	ITF Antalya, Turkiye	W15	Clay	(Romania) Andreea Prisăcariu	4–6, 6–2, 6–2
Loss	4–3	Feb 2024	ITF Antalya, Turkiye	W15	Clay	(Latvia) Daniela Vismane	1–0 ret.
Win	5–3	Apr 2024	ITF Osijek, Croatia	W15	Clay	(Czech Republic) Denisa Hindová	6–2, 6–1
Win	6–3	Nov 2024	ITF Antalya, Turkiye	W15	Clay	(Romania) Ștefania Bojică	6–4, 2–0 ret.
Win	7–3	Feb 2025	ITF Antalya, Turkiye	W35	Clay	(Romania) Irina Bara	6–3, 6–3
Loss	7–4	Mar 2025	Székesfehérvár Open, Hungary	W75	Clay (i)	(Austria) Sinja Kraus	6–2, 5–7, 3–6
Win	8–4	May 2025	ITF Otočec, Slovenia	W50	Clay	(Belgium) Sofia Costoulas	6–3, 6–3

=== Doubles: 28 (16 titles, 12 runner-ups) ===
Legend W75 tournaments W50 tournaments W25/35 tournaments W15 tournaments	Finals by surface Hard (0–1) Clay (16–11)

Result	W–L	Date	Tournament	Tier	Surface	Partner	Opponents	Score
Win	1–0	Jun 2021	ITF Antalya, Turkey	W15	Clay	(Turkey) Başak Eraydın	(United States) Jessie Aney (United States) Christina Rosca	4–6, 6–1, [10–7]
Win	2–0	Jul 2021	ITF Antalya, Turkey	W15	Clay	(France) Julie Belgraver	(United States) Christina Rosca (Bulgaria) Ani Vangelova	6–2, 7–5
Loss	2–1	Sep 2021	ITF Dijon, France	W15	Clay	(France) Lucie Wargnier	(Switzerland) Naïma Karamoko (Switzerland) Xenia Knoll	2–6, 2–6
Win	3–1	Oct 2021	ITF Antalya, Turkey	W15	Clay	(Hungary) Dorka Drahota-Szabó	(Slovakia) Romana Čisovská (Hungary) Adrienn Nagy	6–3, 2–6, [10–4]
Loss	3–2	Nov 2021	ITF Antalya, Turkey	W15	Hard	(Serbia) Tamara Čurović	(Russia) Diana Shnaider (Ukraine) Anastasiya Soboleva	2–6, 0–6
Win	4–2	Dec 2021	ITF Antalya, Turkey	W15	Clay	(Russia) Ksenia Laskutova	(Spain) Claudia Hoste Ferrer (Spain) Carlota Martinez Cirez	6–0, 7–5
Win	5–2	Dec 2021	ITF Antalya, Turkey	W15	Clay	(Russia) Ksenia Laskutova	(Croatia) Mariana Dražić (Argentina) Jazmín Ortenzi	6–4, 6–2
Loss	5–3	Dec 2021	ITF Antalya, Turkey	W15	Clay	(Russia) Ksenia Laskutova	(Romania) Oana Gavrilă (Romania) Arina Vasilescu	6–1, 4–6, [10–12]
Loss	5–4	Feb 2022	ITF Antalya, Turkey	W15	Clay	(Italy) Angelica Moratelli	(Croatia) Mariana Dražić (Germany) Katharina Hobgarski	5–7, 4–6
Win	6–4	Mar 2022	ITF Antalya, Turkey	W25	Clay	Diana Shnaider	Amina Anshba; Maria Timofeeva	6–4, 6–2
Win	7–4	Mar 2022	ITF Antalya, Turkey	W15	Clay	Ksenia Laskutova	(Greece) Sapfo Sakellaridi; Anastasia Zolotareva	7–6^{(4)}, 1–6, [10–7]
Loss	7–5	May 2022	ITF Antalya, Turkey	W15	Clay	(Turkey) İlay Yörük	(Ukraine) Viktoriya Petrenko (Turkey) Doğa Türkmen	5–7, 7–6^{(3)}, [12–14]
Win	8–5	Jul 2022	ITF Kottingbrunn, Austria	W15	Clay	(Turkey) Doğa Türkmen	(Chile) Fernanda Labraña (Italy) Dalila Spiteri	w/o
Win	9–5	Aug 2022	ITF Mogyoród, Hungary	W25	Clay	(Romania) Ilona Georgiana Ghioroaie	(France) Carole Monnet (France) Marine Partaud	7–5, 6–0
Loss	9–6	Sep 2022	ITF Vienna, Austria	W25	Clay	(Slovenia) Živa Falkner	(Germany) Lena Papadakis (Czech Republic) Anna Sisková	6–7^{(8)}, 4–6
Win	10–6	Dec 2022	ITF Antalya, Turkiye	W15	Clay	(Croatia) Mariana Dražić	(Greece) Eleni Christofi; Anna Ureke	1–6, 7–5, [10–4]
Loss	10–7	Dec 2022	ITF Antalya, Turkiye	W15	Clay	(Croatia) Mariana Dražić	Yana Karpovich; Daria Lodikova	5–7, 2–6
Win	11–7	Jun 2023	ITF Annenheim, Austria	W25	Clay	Anna Zyryanova	(Czech Republic) Michaela Bayerlová (Switzerland) Jenny Dürst	6–4, 2–6, [10–8]
Win	12–7	Aug 2023	ITF Osijek, Croatia	W25	Clay	(Romania) Ilona Georgiana Ghioroaie	(Germany) Luisa Meyer auf der Heide (Greece) Dimitra Pavlou	6–2, 6–4
Loss	12–8	Aug 2023	ITF Erwitte, Germany	W25	Clay	Ekaterina Ovcharenko	(Slovenia) Nika Radišić (Bosnia and Herzegovina) Anita Wagner	5–7, 6–7^{(4)}
Win	13–8	Dec 2023	ITF Antalya, Turkiye	W15	Clay	Rada Zolotareva	(Netherlands) Rikke de Koning (Netherlands) Madelief Hageman	6–1, 6–4
Win	14–8	Jul 2024	Zagreb Open, Croatia	W50	Clay	(Slovenia) Živa Falkner	(Bulgaria) Lia Karatancheva (Greece) Sapfo Sakellaridi	6–4, 6–3
Loss	14–9	Aug 2024	ITF Trieste, Italy	W35	Clay	(Slovenia) Živa Falkner	(Italy) Anastasia Abbagnato (Bosnia and Herzegovina) Anita Wagner	3–6, 6–4, [9–11]
Win	15–9	Sep 2024	Šibenik Open, Croatia	W75	Clay	(Slovenia) Živa Falkner	(Cyprus) Raluca Șerban (Romania) Anca Todoni	2–1 ret.
Win	16–9	Nov 2025	ITF Antalya, Turkiye	W35	Clay	Amina Anshba	(Romania) Ilinca Amariei (Croatia) Lucija Ćirić Bagarić	7–5, 7–5
Loss	16–10	Jan 2026	ITF Antalya, Turkiye	W35	Clay	(Croatia) Lucija Ćirić Bagarić	Darya Astakhova (Romania) Andreea Prisăcariu	2–6, 6–3, [8–10]
Loss	16–11	May 2026	ITF Portorož, Slovenia	W50	Clay	Alevtina Ibragimova	(Italy) Angelica Moratelli; Anastasia Tikhonova	6–3, 3–6, [4–10]
Loss	16–12	June 2026	ITF Gdańsk, Poland	W50	Clay	(Kazakhstan) Zhibek Kulambayeva	(Poland) Weronika Falkowska (Spain) Georgina García Pérez	6–3, 5–7, [9–11]

== Junior Grand Slam tournament finals ==
=== Doubles: 1 (runner-up) ===
Result	Date	Tournament	Surface	Partner	Opponents	Score
Loss	2021	French Open	Clay	(Russia) Maria Bondarenko	(Philippines) Alex Eala (Russia) Oksana Selekhmeteva	0–6, 5–7

== National representation ==
=== Billie Jean King Cup ===
Tóth made her debut for the Hungary Billie Jean King Cup team in 2022, while the team was competing in the Europe/Africa Zone Group I.

Group membership World Group World Group Play-off World Group II World Group II Play-off Europe/Africa Group (3–2)	Matches by surface Hard (0–0) Clay (3–2)	Matches by type Singles (0–0) Doubles (3–2)	Matches by setting Indoors (0–0) Outdoors (3–2)

==== Doubles (3–2) ====
Edition	Stage	Date	Location	Against	Surface	Partner	Opponents	W/L	Score
2022	Z1 RR	13 April 2022	Antalya (TUR)	Denmark	Clay	Anna Bondár	Sofia Samavati; Johanne Svendsen	W	6–2, 6–4
2022	Z1 RR	15 April 2022	Antalya (TUR)	Estonia	Clay	Réka Luca Jani	Anet Angelika Koskel; Katriin Saar	W	6–1, 6–3
2022	Z1 PO	16 April 2022	Antalya (TUR)	Slovenia	Clay	Réka Luca Jani	Kaja Juvan; Lara Smejkal	L	walkover
2023	Z1 RR	11 April 2023	Antalya (TUR)	Egypt	Clay	Réka Luca Jani	Lamis Alhussein Abdel Aziz; Rana Sherif Ahmed	W	6–1, 6–2
2023	Z1 PO	15 April 2023	Antalya (TUR)	Sweden	Clay	Réka Luca Jani	Jacqueline Cabaj Awad; Kajsa Rinaldo Persson	L	2–6, 2–6

== Controversy ==
In the first round of singles at the 2023 Budapest Grand Prix, Tóth rubbed out a contested ball mark with her foot after her opponent, Zhang Shuai, had remonstrated with the umpire over the line call. The mark appeared to show that Zhang's shot had landed in, and she argued with the umpire for six minutes over the decision to award the point to Tóth. After the match continued and final decision of the point was decided by the umpire, Toth walked up to the mark and erased it. When Tóth was asked by Zhang why she did that, Tóth replied, "Because you’re making problems, that’s why." Eventually, Zhang retired from her match against Tóth, citing a severe panic attack incited by Tóth's actions and a hostile crowd. Upon Zhang's retirement, Tóth openly celebrated; it was her first WTA Tour singles main draw, and the situation ended up giving Tóth her first and last career victory.

Tóth's actions of erasing the ball mark, allegedly mocking Zhang's outburst, and celebrating at her retirement sparked backlash among the tennis community. Current players described them as "disgusting" (Ajla Tomljanović), "[I give] zero respect to her" (Daria Saville), "a quick way to lose respect from your peers" (Ellen Perez), "one of the worst line calls and poorly handled situations" (Jamie Loeb), "very bad sportsmanship" (Daria Kasatkina), "not acceptable" (Ons Jabeur), "another level of unsportsmanlike conduct" (Victoria Azarenka), and that Tóth "should be banned from the tour" (Maria Sakkari). Former world No. 1, Martina Navratilova, described Tóth as "a bad sport".

Tóth subsequently lost her next match to Kateryna Baindl, and after several days gave a public apology for her actions.
