= 2024 Le Neubourg Open International =

Tennis tournament

- Date: 9–15 September 2024
- Edition: 4th
- Category: ITF Women's World Tennis Tour
- Prize money: $60,000
- Surface: Hard / Outdoor
- Location: Le Neubourg, France

Champions

Singles
- (France) Tessah Andrianjafitrimo

Doubles
- (Israel) Lina Glushko / Anastasia Tikhonova
← 2023 ·	ITF Féminin Le Neubourg	· 2025 →

The 2024 Le Neubourg Open International was a professional tennis tournament played on outdoor hard courts. It was the fourth edition of the tournament, which was part of the 2024 ITF Women's World Tennis Tour. It took place in Le Neubourg, France, between 9 and 15 September 2024.

== Champions ==
=== Singles ===
- (France) Tessah Andrianjafitrimo def. (France) Manon Léonard, 6–2, 6–4

=== Doubles ===
- (Israel) Lina Glushko / Anastasia Tikhonova def. Julia Avdeeva / Ekaterina Maklakova, 6–3, 6–1

== Singles main draw entrants ==
=== Seeds ===
Country	Player	Rank	Seed
UKR	Daria Snigur	125	1
	Anastasia Tikhonova	180	2
CZE	Linda Klimovičová	193	3
	Julia Avdeeva	195	4
FRA	Manon Léonard	215	5
FRA	Margaux Rouvroy	221	6
FRA	Harmony Tan	225	7
ISR	Lina Glushko	231	8

- Rankings are as of 26 August 2024.

=== Other entrants ===
The following players received wildcards into the singles main draw:

- (France) Tessah Andrianjafitrimo
- (France) Julie Belgraver
- (France) Aravane Rezaï
- (France) Marine Szostak

The following players received entry from the qualifying draw:

- (United States) Ayana Akli
- (Denmark) Olga Helmi
- (Germany) Tayisiya Morderger
- (Germany) Yana Morderger
- (France) Pauline Payet
- (France) Alyssa Réguer
- (Slovakia) Katarína Strešnáková
- (Germany) Anja Wildgruber
