= 2025 Le Neubourg Open International – Singles =

Singles
- 2025 Le Neubourg Open International

Final
- Champion: (Belgium) Greet Minnen
- Runner-up: (Croatia) Petra Marčinko
- Score: 6–2, 6–1

Events
Singles	Doubles
← 2024 ·	ITF Féminin Le Neubourg	· 2026 →

Tessah Andrianjafitrimo was the defending champion, but lost in the quarterfinals to Greet Minnen.

Minnen went on to win the title, defeating Petra Marčinko 6–2, 6–1 in the final.

== Seeds ==
1. (Belgium) Greet Minnen (champion)
2. (Croatia) Petra Marčinko (final)
3. (Belgium) Sofia Costoulas (quarterfinals, retired)
4. (Lithuania) Justina Mikulskytė (first round)
5. (France) Tessah Andrianjafitrimo (quarterfinals)
6. (United Kingdom) Lily Miyazaki (quarterfinals)
7. (France) Harmony Tan (second round)
8. (United States) Ayana Akli (first round)

== Draw ==
Key

- Q = Qualifier
- WC = Wild card
- LL = Lucky loser
- Alt = Alternate
- ITF = ITF entry
- PR = Protected ranking
- SR = Special ranking
- SE = Special exempt
- JE = Junior exempt
- JR = Junior Accelerator Programme entrant
- CO = College Accelerator Programme entrant
- NG = Next Gen Accelerator Program entrant
- w/o = Walkover
- r = Retired
- d = Defaulted

=== Finals ===
Semifinals
1	(Belgium) Greet Minnen	4	6	6
Polina Iatcenko	6	2	1
(France) Astrid Lew Yan Foon	3	1
2	(Croatia) Petra Marčinko	6	6

Final
1	(Belgium) Greet Minnen	6	6
2	(Croatia) Petra Marčinko	2	1

=== Top half ===
First round
1	(Belgium) G Minnen	6	6
WC	(France) A Réguer	0	1
WC	(France) J Lim	4	2
(France) M Lollia	6	6
(Poland) U Radwańska	6	7
(Belgium) C Vlasselaer	2	5
(United States) A Blokhina	2	2
5	(France) T Andrianjafitrimo	6	6
3	(Belgium) S Costoulas	6	6
Q	(France) G Kalamaris	2	1
Q	(Germany) GM Dittmann	2	6	7
(France) D Martynov	6	2	5
Q	S Lansere	6	4	5
P Iatcenko	2	6	7
Q	(Germany) M Thamm	4	1
7	(France) H Tan	6	6

Second round
1	(Belgium) G Minnen	7	6
(France) M Lollia	5	3
(Poland) U Radwańska	6	2	2
5	(France) T Andrianjafitrimo	0	6	6
3	(Belgium) S Costoulas	6	6
Q	(Germany) GM Dittmann	3	2
P Iatcenko	6	6
7	(France) H Tan	2	1

Quarterfinals
1	(Belgium) G Minnen	6	7
5	(France) T Andrianjafitrimo	1	5
3	(Belgium) S Costoulas	2^{r}
P Iatcenko	5

Semifinals
1	(Belgium) G Minnen	4	6	6
P Iatcenko	6	2	1

=== Bottom half ===
First round
6	(United Kingdom) L Miyazaki	6	7
(France) T Lemaître	3	5
Q	(United Kingdom) V Allen	6	6
Q	(France) A Lim	1	1
(France) A Lew Yan Foon	4
Q	V Mincheva	1^{r}
(United Kingdom) N Bains	6	6
4	(Lithuania) J Mikulskytė	2	2
8	(United States) A Akli	6	4	1
Q	(France) M Szostak	2	6	6
(France) M Rouvroy	6	6
WC	(France) S Baslilar	4	1
WC	(France) M Arcangioli	6	6^{5}	7
(United Kingdom) A Gillan	3	7^{7}	5
(Morocco) Y Kabbaj	3	3
2	(Croatia) P Marčinko	6	6

Second round
6	(United Kingdom) L Miyazaki	6	6
Q	(United Kingdom) V Allen	2	4
(France) A Lew Yan Foon	6	6
(United Kingdom) N Bains	4	2
Q	(France) M Szostak	5	0^{r}
(France) M Rouvroy	7	1
WC	(France) M Arcangioli	2	3
2	(Croatia) P Marčinko	6	6

Quarterfinals
6	(United Kingdom) L Miyazaki	6	4	1
(France) A Lew Yan Foon	3	6	6
(France) M Rouvroy	7^{8}	3	2
2	(Croatia) P Marčinko	6^{6}	6	6

Semifinals
(France) A Lew Yan Foon	3	1
2	(Croatia) P Marčinko	6	6
