= 2021 ITF Féminin Le Neubourg =

Tennis tournament

- Date: 27 September–3 October 2021
- Edition: 1st
- Category: ITF Women's World Tennis Tour
- Prize money: $80,000+H
- Surface: Hard
- Location: Le Neubourg, France

Champions

Singles
- (Romania) Mihaela Buzărnescu

Doubles
- (United States) Robin Anderson / (France) Amandine Hesse
ITF Féminin Le Neubourg	· 2022 →

The 2021 ITF Féminin Le Neubourg was a professional women's tennis tournament played on outdoor hard courts. It was the first edition of the tournament which was part of the 2021 ITF Women's World Tennis Tour. It took place in Le Neubourg, France between 27 September and 3 October 2021.

== Singles main-draw entrants ==
=== Seeds ===
Country	Player	Rank^{1}	Seed
MNE	Danka Kovinić	80	1
FRA	Harmony Tan	120	2
ROU	Mihaela Buzărnescu	175	3
HUN	Anna Bondár	179	4
FRA	Amandine Hesse	180	5
ITA	Lucrezia Stefanini	199	6
FRA	Jessika Ponchet	207	7
NED	Indy de Vroome	212	8

- ^{1} Rankings are as of 20 September 2021.

=== Other entrants ===
The following players received wildcards into the singles main draw:

- (France) Manon Arcangioli
- (France) Loïs Boisson
- (France) Salma Djoubri
- (France) Lucie Nguyen Tan

The following player received entry using a protected ranking:

- (Czech Republic) Tereza Smitková

The following player received entry as a junior exempt:

- (Ukraine) Daria Snigur

The following players received entry from the qualifying draw:

- (France) Audrey Albié
- (France) Estelle Cascino
- (United Kingdom) Sarah Beth Grey
- (Japan) Momoko Kobori
- (Belarus) Anna Kubareva
- (Brazil) Laura Pigossi
- (France) Aravane Rezaï
- (Belarus) Iryna Shymanovich

The following player received entry as a lucky loser:

- (United States) Chiara Scholl

== Champions ==
=== Singles ===
- (Romania) Mihaela Buzărnescu def. (Hungary) Anna Bondár, 6–1, 6–3

=== Doubles ===
- (United States) Robin Anderson / (France) Amandine Hesse def. (France) Estelle Cascino / (United Kingdom) Sarah Beth Grey, 6–3, 7–6^{(7–2)}
