= 2023 ITF Féminin Le Neubourg =

Tennis tournament

- Date: 11–17 September 2023
- Edition: 3rd
- Category: ITF Women's World Tennis Tour
- Prize money: $80,000+H
- Surface: Hard / Outdoor
- Location: Le Neubourg, France

Champions

Singles
- (Switzerland) Céline Naef

Doubles
- (France) Fiona Ferro / Alina Korneeva
← 2022 ·	ITF Féminin Le Neubourg	· 2024 →

The 2023 ITF Féminin Le Neubourg (branded as the Le Neubourg Open International Guillarmic-Agencement for sponsorship reasons) is a professional tennis tournament played on outdoor hard courts. It is the third edition of the tournament which was part of the 2023 ITF Women's World Tennis Tour. It took place in Le Neubourg, France between 11 and 17 September 2023.

== Champions ==
=== Singles ===
- (Switzerland) Céline Naef def. Alina Korneeva, 4–6, 6–2, 7–6^{(9–7)}

=== Doubles ===
- (France) Fiona Ferro / Alina Korneeva def. (Ukraine) Maryna Kolb / (Ukraine) Nadiya Kolb, 7–6^{(9–7)}, 7–5

== Singles main draw entrants ==
=== Seeds ===
Country	Player	Rank^{1}	Seed
ITA	Lucrezia Stefanini	102	1
FRA	Océane Dodin	117	2
SUI	Simona Waltert	150	3
SUI	Céline Naef	162	4
FRA	Fiona Ferro	190	5
HUN	Tímea Babos	200	6
	Alina Korneeva	212	7
FRA	Alice Robbe	218	8

- ^{1} Rankings are as of 28 August 2023.

=== Other entrants ===
The following players received wildcards into the singles main draw:

- (France) Manon Arcangioli
- (France) Nahia Berecoechea
- (France) Tiphanie Lemaître
- (France) Jenny Lim

The following players received entry from the qualifying draw:

- (United Kingdom) Sarah Beth Grey
- (Denmark) Olga Helmi
- (Japan) Mana Kawamura
- (France) Manon Léonard
- (Turkey) Pemra Özgen
- (Germany) Julia Stusek
- (Romania) Arina Vasilescu
- Ksenia Zaytseva

The following player received entry as a lucky loser:

- (Ukraine) Nadiya Kolb
