= 2024 Le Neubourg Open International – Singles =

Singles
- 2024 Le Neubourg Open International

Final
- Champion: (France) Tessah Andrianjafitrimo
- Runner-up: (France) Manon Léonard
- Score: 6–2, 6–4

Events
Singles	Doubles
← 2023 ·	ITF Féminin Le Neubourg	· 2025 →

Céline Naef was the defending champion but chose not to participate.

Tessah Andrianjafitrimo won the title, defeating Manon Léonard in the final, 6–2, 6–4.

== Seeds ==
1. (Ukraine) Daria Snigur (second round)
2. Anastasia Tikhonova (second round)
3. (Czech Republic) Linda Klimovičová (semifinals, retired)
4. Julia Avdeeva (second round)
5. (France) Manon Léonard (final)
6. (France) Margaux Rouvroy (quarterfinals)
7. (France) Harmony Tan (quarterfinals)
8. (Israel) Lina Glushko (second round)

== Draw ==
=== Key ===
- Q = Qualifier
- WC = Wild card
- LL = Lucky loser
- Alt = Alternate
- SE = Special exempt
- PR = Protected ranking
- ITF = ITF entry
- JE = Junior exempt
- w/o = Walkover
- r = Retired
- d = Defaulted
- SR = Special ranking

=== Finals ===
Semifinals
WC	(France) Tessah Andrianjafitrimo	6	2	6
(United Kingdom) Amarni Banks	0	6	4
3	(Czech Republic) Linda Klimovičová	1	0^{r}
5	(France) Manon Léonard	6	2

Final
WC	(France) Tessah Andrianjafitrimo	6	6
5	(France) Manon Léonard	2	4

=== Top half ===
First round
1	(Ukraine) D Snigur	6	6
Q	(Denmark) O Helmi	1	2
WC	(France) T Andrianjafitrimo	6	6
Q	(United States) A Akli	4	4
E Maklakova	4	7	3
(Austria) T Paszek	6	5	6
WC	(France) J Belgraver	2	4
8	(Israel) L Glushko	6	6
4	J Avdeeva	7^{8}	6
Q	(Germany) Y Morderger	6^{6}	4
(United Kingdom) A Banks	6	6
Q	(Germany) A Wildgruber	2	0
Q	(France) P Payet	6^{1}	6	6
(Uzbekistan) N Abduraimova	7^{7}	4	4
(France) É Dartron	6^{2}	4
6	(France) M Rouvroy	7^{7}	6

Second round
1	(Ukraine) D Snigur	4	6	3
WC	(France) T Andrianjafitrimo	6	2	6
(Austria) T Paszek	6	7
8	(Israel) L Glushko	4	5
4	J Avdeeva	4	3
(United Kingdom) A Banks	6	6
Q	(France) P Payet	0	7^{7}	4
6	(France) M Rouvroy	6	6^{3}	6

Quarterfinals
WC	(France) T Andrianjafitrimo	6	6^{5}	6
(Austria) T Paszek	1	7^{7}	2
(United Kingdom) A Banks	4	6	6
6	(France) M Rouvroy	6	4	4

Semifinals
WC	(France) T Andrianjafitrimo	6	2	6
(United Kingdom) A Banks	0	6	4

=== Bottom half ===
First round
7	(France) H Tan	7	6
WC	(France) A Rezaï	5	4
(France) A Robbe	6	6
Q	(Germany) T Morderger	4	3
(Poland) G Feistel	6	6^{3}	6
WC	(France) M Szostak	4	7^{7}	2
(Chinese Taipei) J Garland	6	3	3
3	(Czech Republic) L Klimovičová	2	6	6
5	(France) M Léonard	6	6
Q	(France) A Réguer	2	2
Q	(Slovakia) K Strešnáková	6	6
(Finland) A Kulikova	4	4
(France) A Albié	5	7^{7}	6
(France) D Martynov	7	6^{4}	3
(United States) L Hovde	6	2	1
2	A Tikhonova	4	6	6

Second round
7	(France) H Tan	4	6	6
(France) A Robbe	6	1	1
(Poland) G Feistel	4	1
3	(Czech Republic) L Klimovičová	6	6
5	(France) M Léonard	6	6
Q	(Slovakia) K Strešnáková	3	2
(France) A Albié	0	6	6
2	A Tikhonova	6	4	3

Quarterfinals
7	(France) H Tan	3	0
3	(Czech Republic) L Klimovičová	6	6
5	(France) M Léonard	6	4	6
(France) A Albié	4	6	3

Semifinals
3	(Czech Republic) L Klimovičová	1	0^{r}
5	(France) M Léonard	6	2
