= 2022 ITF Féminin Le Neubourg =

Tennis tournament

- Date: 12–18 September 2022
- Edition: 2nd
- Category: ITF Women's World Tennis Tour
- Prize money: $80,000+H
- Surface: Hard / Outdoor
- Location: Le Neubourg, France

Champions

Singles
- (Romania) Jaqueline Cristian

Doubles
- (United Kingdom) Freya Christie / (United Kingdom) Ali Collins
← 2021 ·	ITF Féminin Le Neubourg	· 2023 →

The 2022 ITF Féminin Le Neubourg was a professional tennis tournament played on outdoor hard courts. It was the second edition of the tournament which was part of the 2022 ITF Women's World Tennis Tour. It took place in Le Neubourg, France between 12 and 18 September 2022.

== Champions ==
=== Singles ===
- (Romania) Jaqueline Cristian def. (Belgium) Magali Kempen, 6–4, 6–4

=== Doubles ===
- (United Kingdom) Freya Christie / (United Kingdom) Ali Collins def. (Poland) Weronika Falkowska / (United Kingdom) Sarah Beth Grey, 1–6, 7–6^{(7–4)}, [10–3]

== Singles main draw entrants ==
=== Seeds ===
Country	Player	Rank^{1}	Seed
ROU	Jaqueline Cristian	77	1
FRA	Océane Dodin	98	2
POL	Magdalena Fręch	103	3
FRA	Harmony Tan	112	4
FRA	Kristina Mladenovic	123	5
UKR	Daria Snigur	124	6
FRA	Clara Burel	131	7
BEL	Ysaline Bonaventure	151	8

- ^{1} Rankings are as of 29 August 2022.

=== Other entrants ===
The following players received wildcards into the singles main draw:

- (France) Audrey Albié
- (France) Manon Arcangioli
- (France) Océane Babel
- Kristina Dmitruk

The following player received entry into the singles main draw using a protected ranking:

- (China) Lu Jingjing

The following players received entry from the qualifying draw:

- (United Kingdom) Anna Brogan
- (United Kingdom) Freya Christie
- (Ukraine) Nadiya Kolb
- (France) Emma Léné
- (Estonia) Maileen Nuudi
- (France) Marine Partaud
- (Austria) Tamira Paszek
- (Switzerland) Arlinda Rushiti
