= 2021 Internationaux de Strasbourg – Singles =

Singles
- 2021 Internationaux de Strasbourg

Final
- Champion: (Czech Republic) Barbora Krejčíková
- Runner-up: (Romania) Sorana Cîrstea
- Score: 6–3, 6–3

Details
- Draw: 32
- Seeds: 8

Events
Singles	Doubles
← 2020 ·	Internationaux de Strasbourg	· 2022 →

Elina Svitolina was the defending champion but chose not to participate.

Barbora Krejčíková won her maiden WTA singles title, defeating Sorana Cîrstea in the final, 6–3, 6–3.

== Seeds ==
1. (Canada) Bianca Andreescu (quarterfinals, withdrew)
2. (United States) Jessica Pegula (first round)
3. (Russia) Ekaterina Alexandrova (quarterfinals)
4. (Kazakhstan) Yulia Putintseva (quarterfinals)
5. (Czech Republic) Barbora Krejčíková (champion)
6. (China) Zhang Shuai (second round)
7. (United States) Shelby Rogers (second round)
8. (Poland) Magda Linette (semifinals)

== Draw ==
=== Key ===
- Q = Qualifier
- WC = Wild card
- LL = Lucky loser
- Alt = Alternate
- SE = Special exempt
- PR = Protected ranking
- ITF = ITF entry
- JE = Junior exempt
- w/o = Walkover
- r = Retired
- d = Defaulted
- SR = Special ranking

=== Finals ===
Semifinals
(Romania) Sorana Cîrstea	3	6	6
8	(Poland) Magda Linette	6	4	2
5	(Czech Republic) Barbora Krejčíková	5	6	6
Q	(Germany) Jule Niemeier	7	3	4

Final
(Romania) Sorana Cîrstea	3	3
5	(Czech Republic) Barbora Krejčíková	6	6

=== Top half ===
First round
1	(Canada) B Andreescu	6	6
Q	(Spain) A Lázaro García	1	2
Q	(Belgium) M Zanevska	6	6
Q	(Belarus) Y Hatouka	2	1
(United States) V Williams	1	6	1
(Romania) S Cîrstea	6	2	6
(Japan) M Doi	5	4
6	(China) S Zhang	7	6
4	(Kazakhstan) Y Putintseva	6	3	7^{7}
(Sweden) R Peterson	4	6	6^{2}
(Russia) A Blinkova	2	3
(Switzerland) J Teichmann	6	6
(Czech Republic) Kr Plíšková	4	5
(France) A Cornet	6	7
(Japan) N Hibino	2	0
8	(Poland) M Linette	6	6

Second round
1	(Canada) B Andreescu	6	6
Q	(Belgium) M Zanevska	1	4
(Romania) S Cîrstea	6	6
6	(China) S Zhang	2	1
4	(Kazakhstan) Y Putintseva	2
(Switzerland) J Teichmann	0^{r}
(France) A Cornet	6^{2}	0^{r}
8	(Poland) M Linette	7^{7}	3

Quarterfinals
1	(Canada) B Andreescu
(Romania) S Cîrstea	w/o
4	(Kazakhstan) Y Putintseva	3	3
8	(Poland) M Linette	6	6

Semifinals
(Romania) S Cîrstea	3	6	6
8	(Poland) M Linette	6	4	2

=== Bottom half ===
First round
5	(Czech Republic) B Krejčíková	6	3
Q	(France) O Dodin	3	0^{r}
(France) C Garcia	7	6
(Kazakhstan) Z Diyas	5	2
(Russia) V Gracheva	3	1
WC	(France) C Burel	6	6
(United States) L Davis	1	5
3	(Russia) E Alexandrova	6	7
7	(United States) S Rogers	7	6^{6}	7
(United States) C McHale	5	7^{8}	5
Q	(Germany) J Niemeier	6	6
Q	(France) D Parry	4	3
(Belgium) A Van Uytvanck	4	4
WC	(France) H Tan	6	6
(Netherlands) A Rus	6	6
2	(United States) J Pegula	4	4

Second round
5	(Czech Republic) B Krejčíková	3	6	6
(France) C Garcia	6	2	1
WC	(France) C Burel	3	4
3	(Russia) E Alexandrova	6	6
7	(United States) S Rogers	4	6^{6}
Q	(Germany) J Niemeier	6	7^{8}
WC	(France) H Tan	1	1^{r}
(Netherlands) A Rus	6	1

Quarterfinals
5	(Czech Republic) B Krejčíková	7^{7}	6
3	(Russia) E Alexandrova	6^{4}	1
Q	(Germany) J Niemeier	6	6
(Netherlands) A Rus	4	1

Semifinals
5	(Czech Republic) B Krejčíková	5	6	6
Q	(Germany) J Niemeier	7	3	4

== Qualifying ==
=== Seeds ===
1. (Russia) Varvara Gracheva (moved to main draw)
2. (Kazakhstan) Zarina Diyas (moved to main draw)
3. (United States) Christina McHale (moved to main draw)
4. (Germany) Andrea Petkovic (qualifying competition)
5. (France) Océane Dodin (qualified)
6. (France) Chloé Paquet (first round)
7. (Germany) Jule Niemeier (qualified)
8. (Switzerland) Simona Waltert (qualifying competition)
9. (Norway) Ulrikke Eikeri (first round)
10. (Italy) Jessica Pieri (first round)
11. (China) Zheng Qinwen (first round)
12. (Belgium) Maryna Zanevska (qualified)

=== Qualifiers ===
1. (Belarus) Yuliya Hatouka
2. (Belgium) Maryna Zanevska
3. (France) Diane Parry
4. (Germany) Jule Niemeier
5. (France) Océane Dodin
6. (Spain) Andrea Lázaro García

=== Draw ===
==== First qualifier ====
First round					Qualifying competition
						(Belarus) Yuliya Hatouka	6	7
					WC	(France) Evita Ramirez	3	5
WC	(France) Evita Ramirez	3	6	7^{7}	WC	(France) Evita Ramirez	3	5
10	(Italy) Jessica Pieri	6	4	6^{4}

==== Second qualifier ====
First round
Alt	(Russia) Angelina Gabueva	5	2
(Greece) Despina Papamichail	7	6
WC	(France) Elsa Jacquemot	5	6^{3}
12	(Belgium) Maryna Zanevska	7	7^{7}

Qualifying competition
(Greece) Despina Papamichail	6	2	5
12	(Belgium) Maryna Zanevska	4	6	7

==== Third qualifier ====
First round					Qualifying competition
						(France) Diane Parry	2	6	6
					PR	(India) Karman Thandi	6	4	2
PR	(India) Karman Thandi	6	4	7^{7}	PR	(India) Karman Thandi	6	4	2
11	(China) Zheng Qinwen	3	6	6^{1}

==== Fourth qualifier ====
First round
4	(Germany) Andrea Petkovic	7	6^{3}	6
WC	(France) Estelle Cascino	5	7^{7}	2
(Italy) Bianca Turati	0	4
7	(Germany) Jule Niemeier	6	6

Qualifying competition
4	(Germany) Andrea Petkovic	3	7^{7}	3
7	(Germany) Jule Niemeier	6	6^{4}	6

==== Fifth qualifier ====
First round
5	(France) Océane Dodin	6	6
PR	(United Kingdom) Naiktha Bains	4	0
(Argentina) Paula Ormaechea	3	3
8	(Switzerland) Simona Waltert	6	6

Qualifying competition
5	(France) Océane Dodin	6	7
8	(Switzerland) Simona Waltert	4	5

==== Sixth qualifier ====
First round
6	(France) Chloé Paquet	4	7	3
WC	(France) Jessika Ponchet	6	5	6
(Spain) Andrea Lázaro García	6	6
9	(Norway) Ulrikke Eikeri	4	3

Qualifying competition
WC	(France) Jessika Ponchet	6^{4}	6	3
(Spain) Andrea Lázaro García	7^{7}	1	6
