= 2024 Le Neubourg Open International – Doubles =

Doubles
- 2024 Le Neubourg Open International

Final
- Champions: (Israel) Lina Glushko; Anastasia Tikhonova
- Runners-up: Julia Avdeeva; Ekaterina Maklakova
- Score: 6–3, 6–1

Events
Singles	Doubles
← 2023 ·	ITF Féminin Le Neubourg	· 2025 →

Fiona Ferro and Alina Korneeva were the defending champions but Ferro chose not to participate and Korneeva chose to compete in Monastir instead.

Lina Glushko and Anastasia Tikhonova won the title, defeating Julia Avdeeva and Ekaterina Maklakova in the final, 6–3, 6–1.

== Seeds ==
1. (Germany) Tayisiya Morderger / (Germany) Yana Morderger (semifinals)
2. Julia Avdeeva / Ekaterina Maklakova (final)
3. (Israel) Lina Glushko / Anastasia Tikhonova (champions)
4. (United Kingdom) Madeleine Brooks / (United Kingdom) Lauryn John-Baptiste (semifinals)

== Draw ==
=== Key ===
- Q = Qualifier
- WC = Wild card
- LL = Lucky loser
- Alt = Alternate
- SE = Special exempt
- PR = Protected ranking
- ITF = ITF entry
- JE = Junior exempt
- w/o = Walkover
- r = Retired
- d = Defaulted
- SR = Special ranking

First round
(Austria) T Paszek (Hungary) N Szabanin
(France) D Martynov (France) M Szostak	w/o
(France) A Robbe (United Kingdom) E Webley-Smith	6	6
(France) E Mazzoni (France) J Mazzoni	1	1
(France) J Belgraver (Slovakia) K Strešnáková	w/o
(Germany) L Hrda (France) G Kalamaris

Quarterfinals
1	(Germany) T Morderger (Germany) Y Morderger	6	6
(France) D Martynov (France) M Szostak	2	4
3	(Israel) L Glushko; A Tikhonova	6	6
(France) A Robbe (United Kingdom) E Webley-Smith	1	3
(United States) A Akli (United States) C Rosca	6	5	[8]
4	(United Kingdom) M Brooks (United Kingdom) L John-Baptiste	3	7	[10]
(France) J Belgraver (Slovakia) K Strešnáková	5	5
2	J Avdeeva; E Maklakova	7	7

Semifinals
1	(Germany) T Morderger (Germany) Y Morderger	2	4
3	(Israel) L Glushko; A Tikhonova	6	6
4	(United Kingdom) M Brooks (United Kingdom) L John-Baptiste	6^{6}	4
2	J Avdeeva; E Maklakova	7^{8}	6

Final
3	(Israel) L Glushko; A Tikhonova	6	6
2	J Avdeeva; E Maklakova	3	1
