= 2025 Le Neubourg Open International – Doubles =

Doubles
- 2025 Le Neubourg Open International

Final
- Champions: (United Kingdom) Naiktha Bains (India) Rutuja Bhosale
- Runners-up: Polina Iatcenko; Sofya Lansere
- Score: 6–2, 1–6, [10–6]

Events
Singles	Doubles
- ITF Féminin Le Neubourg

Lina Glushko and Anastasia Tikhonova were the defending champions, but chose not to participate this year.

Naiktha Bains and Rutuja Bhosale won the title, after defeating Polina Iatcenko and Sofya Lansere 6–2, 1–6, [10–6] in the final.

== Seeds ==
1. (United States) Ayana Akli / (Switzerland) Naïma Karamoko (semifinals)
2. (United Kingdom) Naiktha Bains / (India) Rutuja Bhosale (champions)
3. Polina Iatcenko / Sofya Lansere (final)
4. (France) Tiphanie Lemaître / (France) Marie Mattel (semifinals)

== Draw ==
Key

- Q = Qualifier
- WC = Wild card
- LL = Lucky loser
- Alt = Alternate
- ITF = ITF entry
- PR = Protected ranking
- SR = Special ranking
- SE = Special exempt
- JE = Junior exempt
- JR = Junior Accelerator Programme entrant
- CO = College Accelerator Programme entrant
- NG = Next Gen Accelerator Program entrant
- w/o = Walkover
- r = Retired
- d = Defaulted

First round
(France) R Morel (France) M Rengeard	1	1
(France) D Martynov (France) M Szostak	6	6
(United Kingdom) V Allen (Italy) V Turini	6	6
(France) J Lim (Poland) U Radwańska	3	3
(Germany) GM Dittmann (Netherlands) D Tran	6	6
(Morocco) Y Kabbaj (France) M Lollia	2	2
(New Caledonia) C Delaunay (France) A Lew Yan Foon	6	6^{5}	[11]
(Denmark) O Gram (France) A Réguer	4	7^{7}	[13]

Quarterfinals
1	(United States) A Akli (Switzerland) N Karamoko	w/o
(France) D Martynov (France) M Szostak
3	P Iatcenko; S Lansere	6	4	[10]
(United Kingdom) V Allen (Italy) V Turini	1	6	[5]
(Germany) GM Dittmann (Netherlands) D Tran	3	1
4	(France) T Lemaître (France) M Mattel	6	6
(Denmark) O Gram (France) A Réguer	4	2
2	(United Kingdom) N Bains (India) R Bhosale	6	6

Semifinals
1	(United States) A Akli (Switzerland) N Karamoko	6	5	[5]
3	P Iatcenko; S Lansere	4	7	[10]
4	(France) T Lemaître (France) M Mattel	4	2
2	(United Kingdom) N Bains (India) R Bhosale	6	6

Final
3	P Iatcenko; S Lansere	2	6	[6]
2	(United Kingdom) N Bains (India) R Bhosale	6	1	[10]
