= 2022 ITF Féminin Le Neubourg – Singles =

Singles
- 2022 ITF Féminin Le Neubourg

Final
- Champion: (Romania) Jaqueline Cristian
- Runner-up: (Belgium) Magali Kempen
- Score: 6–4, 6–4

Events
| Singles | Doubles |
| ← 2021 · | ITF Féminin Le Neubourg | · 2023 → |

Mihaela Buzărnescu was the defending champion but chose not to participate.

Jaqueline Cristian won the title, defeating Magali Kempen in the final, 6–4, 6–4.

== Seeds ==
1. (Romania) Jaqueline Cristian (champion)
2. (France) Océane Dodin (first round)
3. (Poland) Magdalena Fręch (quarterfinals)
4. (France) Harmony Tan (semifinals, retired)
5. (France) Kristina Mladenovic (second round)
6. (Ukraine) Daria Snigur (second round)
7. (France) Clara Burel (first round)
8. (Belgium) Ysaline Bonaventure (quarterfinals)

== Draw ==
=== Key ===
- Q = Qualifier
- WC = Wild card
- LL = Lucky loser
- Alt = Alternate
- SE = Special exempt
- PR = Protected ranking
- ITF = ITF entry
- JE = Junior exempt
- w/o = Walkover
- r = Retired
- d = Defaulted
- SR = Special ranking

=== Finals ===
Semifinals
1 | (Romania) Jaqueline Cristian | 3 | 6 | 3
4 | (France) Harmony Tan | 6 | 4 | 0^{r}
(Belgium) Magali Kempen | 6 | 7^{7}
(Germany) Mona Barthel | 3 | 6^{4}

Final
1 | (Romania) Jaqueline Cristian | 6 | 6
(Belgium) Magali Kempen | 4 | 4

=== Top half ===
First round
1 | (Romania) J Cristian | 6 | 2 | 6
(United Kingdom) S Kartal | 2 | 6 | 3
Q | (France) M Partaud | 7^{7} | 6
Q | (Estonia) M Nuudi | 6^{5} | 0
WC | K Dmitruk | 6 | 7
Q | (Austria) T Paszek | 4 | 5
WC | (France) O Babel | 1 | 1
8 | (Belgium) Y Bonaventure | 6 | 6
4 | (France) H Tan | 6 | 6
(United Kingdom) SB Grey | 2 | 0
(Poland) W Falkowska | 1 | 3
Q | (United Kingdom) F Christie | 6 | 6
P Kudermetova | 6 | 6
Q | (France) E Léné | 3 | 1
(South Korea) S-h Park | 1 | 1
6 | (Ukraine) D Snigur | 6 | 6

Second round
1 | (Romania) J Cristian | 4 | 6 | 6
Q | (France) M Partaud | 6 | 3 | 1
WC | K Dmitruk | 4 | 2
8 | (Belgium) Y Bonaventure | 6 | 6
4 | (France) H Tan | 6 | 6
Q | (United Kingdom) F Christie | 1 | 3
P Kudermetova | 7^{7} | 6
6 | (Ukraine) D Snigur | 6^{0} | 2

Quarterfinals
1 | (Romania) J Cristian | 6 | 1 | 6
8 | (Belgium) Y Bonaventure | 4 | 6 | 4
4 | (France) H Tan | 6 | 6
P Kudermetova | 3 | 1

Semifinals
1 | (Romania) J Cristian | 3 | 6 | 3
4 | (France) H Tan | 6 | 4 | 0^{r}

=== Bottom half ===
First round
7 | (France) C Burel | 2 | 2
(France) E Jacquemot | 6 | 6
(Belgium) M Kempen | 6 | 6
Q | (Ukraine) N Kolb | 4 | 3
(France) A Robbe | 3 | 4
Q | (Switzerland) A Rushiti | 6 | 6
Q | (United Kingdom) A Brogan | 5 | 0
3 | (Poland) M Fręch | 7 | 7
5 | (France) K Mladenovic | 6 | 6
(Chile) D Seguel | 3 | 4
(Germany) M Barthel | 4
PR | (China) Jin Lu | 0^{r}
WC | (France) M Arcangioli | 6 | 6^{0} | 4
(Germany) S Wagner | 2 | 7^{7} | 6
WC | (France) A Albié | 4 | 7^{7} | 7^{7}
2 | (France) O Dodin | 6 | 6^{3} | 6^{5}

Second round
(France) E Jacquemot | 6 | 3 | 2
(Belgium) M Kempen | 4 | 6 | 6
Q | (Switzerland) A Rushiti | 6^{3} | 4
3 | (Poland) M Fręch | 7^{7} | 6
5 | (France) K Mladenovic | 6 | 3 | 2
(Germany) M Barthel | 4 | 6 | 6
(Germany) S Wagner | 2 | 0
WC | (France) A Albié | 6 | 6

Quarterfinals
(Belgium) M Kempen | 4 | 6 | 6
3 | (Poland) M Fręch | 6 | 4 | 3
(Germany) M Barthel | 6 | 6
WC | (France) A Albié | 3 | 2

Semifinals
(Belgium) M Kempen | 6 | 7^{7}
(Germany) M Barthel | 3 | 6^{4}
