= 2022 Internationaux de Strasbourg – Singles =

Singles
- 2022 Internationaux de Strasbourg

Final
- Champion: (Germany) Angelique Kerber
- Runner-up: (Slovenia) Kaja Juvan
- Score: 7–6^{(7–5)}, 6–7^{(0–7)}, 7–6^{(7–5)}

Details
- Draw: 32
- Seeds: 8

Events
Singles	Doubles
- Internationaux de Strasbourg

Angelique Kerber defeated Kaja Juvan in the final, 7–6^{(7–5)}, 6–7^{(0–7)}, 7–6^{(7–5)} to win the singles tennis title at the 2022 Internationaux de Strasbourg. It was her 14th WTA Tour singles title. The final lasted three hours and 20 minutes.

Barbora Krejčíková was the reigning champion, but withdrew before the tournament.

This was Samantha Stosur's final professional appearance in singles; she lost in the first round to Harmony Tan.

== Seeds ==
1. (Czech Republic) Karolína Plíšková (semifinals)
2. (Germany) Angelique Kerber (champion)
3. (Romania) Sorana Cîrstea (first round)
4. (Belgium) Elise Mertens (quarterfinals)
5. (China) Zhang Shuai (first round)
6. (United States) Sloane Stephens (first round)
7. (Czech Republic) Tereza Martincová (withdrew)
8. (Poland) Magda Linette (quarterfinals)
9. (Switzerland) Viktorija Golubic (quarterfinals)

== Draw ==
Key

- Q = Qualifier
- WC = Wild card
- LL = Lucky loser
- Alt = Alternate
- ITF = ITF entry
- PR = Protected ranking
- SR = Special ranking
- SE = Special exempt
- JE = Junior exempt
- JR = Junior Accelerator Programme entrant
- CO = College Accelerator Programme entrant
- NG = Next Gen Accelerator Program entrant
- w/o = Walkover
- r = Retired
- d = Defaulted

=== Finals ===
Semifinals
1/WC	(Czech Republic) Karolína Plíšková	2	5
(Slovenia) Kaja Juvan	6	7
(France) Océane Dodin	6^{2}	0^{r}
2/WC	(Germany) Angelique Kerber	7^{7}	1

Final
(Slovenia) Kaja Juvan	6^{5}	7^{7}	6^{5}
2/WC	(Germany) Angelique Kerber	7^{7}	6^{0}	7^{7}

=== Top half ===
First round
1/WC	(Czech Republic) Ka Plíšková	6	6
(Ukraine) M Kostyuk	4	2
(United States) B Pera	7	6
(Romania) E-G Ruse	5	4
(France) H Tan	6	6
WC	(Australia) S Stosur	2	1
(Belgium) M Zanevska	6	6
5	(China) S Zhang	2	3
4	(Belgium) E Mertens	7	6
WC	(France) C Monnet	5	4
PR	(Australia) D Saville	6	3	6^{5}
(Germany) A-L Friedsam	4	6	7^{7}
(Slovenia) K Juvan	6	6
Q	(Israel) L Glushko	3	1
LL	(Bosnia and Herzegovina) N Berberović	2	6	6
6	(United States) S Stephens	6	4	1

Second round
1/WC	(Czech Republic) Ka Plíšková	6	1	6
(United States) B Pera	3	6	1
(France) H Tan	6	5	1
(Belgium) M Zanevska	4	7	6
4	(Belgium) E Mertens	7	7
(Germany) A-L Friedsam	5	5
(Slovenia) K Juvan	6	6
LL	(Bosnia and Herzegovina) N Berberović	2	3

Quarterfinals
1/WC	(Czech Republic) Ka Plíšková	6	7^{8}
(Belgium) M Zanevska	4	6^{6}
4	(Belgium) E Mertens	6^{3}	4
(Slovenia) K Juvan	7^{7}	6

Semifinals
1/WC	(Czech Republic) Ka Plíšková	2	5
(Slovenia) K Juvan	6	7

=== Bottom half ===
First round
9	(Switzerland) V Golubic	6	6
LL	(Germany) Y Morderger	0	4
LL	A Gabueva	3	4
(France) F Ferro	6	6
(Croatia) A Konjuh	2	6	5
(France) O Dodin	6	1	7
Q	E Makarova	1	6	6
3	(Romania) S Cîrstea	6	3	2
8	(Poland) M Linette	6	6
V Gracheva	3	0
LL	(Germany) K Hobgarski	4	1
(United Kingdom) H Watson	6	6
Q	(France) J Gervais	4	2
Q	A Sasnovich	6	6
(France) D Parry	3	4
2/WC	(Germany) A Kerber	6	6

Second round
9	(Switzerland) V Golubic	6	6
(France) F Ferro	4	2
(France) O Dodin	6	6
Q	E Makarova	2	1
8	(Poland) M Linette	6	6
(United Kingdom) H Watson	1	1
Q	A Sasnovich	2	6	4
2/WC	(Germany) A Kerber	6	3	6

Quarterfinals
9	(Switzerland) V Golubic	3	0
(France) O Dodin	6	6
8	(Poland) M Linette	2	6	4
2/WC	(Germany) A Kerber	6	4	6

Semifinals
(France) O Dodin	6^{2}	0^{r}
2/WC	(Germany) A Kerber	7^{7}	1

== Qualifying ==
=== Seeds ===
1. Aliaksandra Sasnovich (qualified)
2. (Netherlands) Indy de Vroome (first round)
3. (Israel) Lina Glushko (qualified)
4. (Germany) Katharina Hobgarski (qualifying competition, lucky loser)
5. (Bosnia and Herzegovina) Nefisa Berberović (first round, lucky loser)
6. Ekaterina Makarova (qualified)
7. (Germany) Lena Papadakis (qualifying competition)
8. (Belgium) Magali Kempen (first round)

=== Qualifiers ===
1. Aliaksandra Sasnovich
2. Ekaterina Makarova
3. (Israel) Lina Glushko
4. (France) Julie Gervais

=== Lucky losers ===
1. (Germany) Katharina Hobgarski
2. (Germany) Yana Morderger
3. Angelina Gabueva
4. (Bosnia and Herzegovina) Nefisa Berberović

=== Qualifying draw ===
==== First qualifier ====
First round
1	Aliaksandra Sasnovich	6	6
Vlada Koval	1	3
(Belgium) Lara Salden	2	5
7	(Germany) Lena Papadakis	6	7

Qualifying competition
1	Aliaksandra Sasnovich	6	6
7	(Germany) Lena Papadakis	2	3

==== Second qualifier ====
First round
2	(Netherlands) Indy de Vroome	2	4
(Germany) Yana Morderger	6	6
(Germany) Tayisiya Morderger	2	2
6	Ekaterina Makarova	6	6

Qualifying competition
(Germany) Yana Morderger	5	0
6	Ekaterina Makarova	7	6

==== Third qualifier ====
First round
3	(Israel) Lina Glushko	6	6
(Estonia) Elena Malõgina	1	3
Angelina Gabueva	6	6
5	(Bosnia and Herzegovina) Nefisa Berberović	4	4

Qualifying competition
3	(Israel) Lina Glushko	6	3	6
Angelina Gabueva	3	6	2

==== Fourth qualifier ====
First round
4	(Germany) Katharina Hobgarski	6	6
WC	(France) Evita Ramirez	0	2
WC	(France) Julie Gervais	6	7
8	(Belgium) Magali Kempen	4	5

Qualifying competition
4	(Germany) Katharina Hobgarski	4	0
WC	(France) Julie Gervais	6	6
