= 2021 ITF Féminin Le Neubourg – Doubles =

Doubles
- 2021 ITF Féminin Le Neubourg

Final
- Champions: (United States) Robin Anderson (France) Amandine Hesse
- Runners-up: (France) Estelle Cascino (United Kingdom) Sarah Beth Grey
- Score: 6–3, 7–6^{(7–2)}

Events
Singles	Doubles
ITF Féminin Le Neubourg	· 2022 →

This was the first edition of the tournament.

Robin Anderson and Amandine Hesse won the title, defeating Estelle Cascino and Sarah Beth Grey in the final, 6–3, 7–6^{(7–2)}.

== Seeds ==
1. (Brazil) Laura Pigossi / (Netherlands) Rosalie van der Hoek (first round, retired)
2. (France) Jessika Ponchet / (United Kingdom) Eden Silva (first round)
3. (Hungary) Anna Bondár / (Switzerland) Xenia Knoll (semifinals)
4. (France) Estelle Cascino / (United Kingdom) Sarah Beth Grey (final)

== Draw ==
=== Key ===
- Q = Qualifier
- WC = Wild card
- LL = Lucky loser
- Alt = Alternate
- SE = Special exempt
- PR = Protected ranking
- ITF = ITF entry
- JE = Junior exempt
- w/o = Walkover
- r = Retired
- d = Defaulted
- SR = Special ranking

=== Draw ===
First round
1	(Brazil) L Pigossi (Netherlands) R van der Hoek	6^{5}	2^{r}
(France) M Arcangioli (France) K Le Bihan	7^{7}	4
(Japan) M Kobori (Poland) M Kubka	1	4
(France) A Albié (France) A Robbe	6	6
4	(France) E Cascino (United Kingdom) SB Grey	4	6	[10]
(Belarus) K Dmitruk (Russia) D Shnaider	6	3	[7]
(Belarus) A Kubareva (Belarus) I Shymanovich	4	5
(United Kingdom) A Barnett (United Kingdom) O Nicholls	6	7
(Romania) K Bejenaru (France) V Muntean	4	6	[10]
(France) O Babel (France) L Nguyen Tan	6	2	[7]
(United States) C Scholl (France) L Wargnier	2	2
3	(Hungary) A Bondár (Switzerland) X Knoll	6	6
(France) S Djoubri (Australia) O Gadecki	2	3
(Netherlands) A Hartono (Russia) O Selekhmeteva	6	6
(United States) R Anderson (France) A Hesse	4	6	[10]
2	(France) J Ponchet (United Kingdom) E Silva	6	4	[6]

Quarterfinals
(France) M Arcangioli (France) K Le Bihan	4	5
(France) A Albié (France) A Robbe	6	7
4	(France) E Cascino (United Kingdom) SB Grey	w/o
(United Kingdom) A Barnett (United Kingdom) O Nicholls
(Romania) K Bejenaru (France) V Muntean	3	5
3	(Hungary) A Bondár (Switzerland) X Knoll	6	7
(Netherlands) A Hartono (Russia) O Selekhmeteva	7^{9}	5	[6]
(United States) R Anderson (France) A Hesse	6^{7}	7	[10]

Semifinals
(France) A Albié (France) A Robbe	3	1
4	(France) E Cascino (United Kingdom) SB Grey	6	6
3	(Hungary) A Bondár (Switzerland) X Knoll	5	2
(United States) R Anderson (France) A Hesse	7	6

Final
4	(France) E Cascino (United Kingdom) SB Grey	3	6^{2}
(United States) R Anderson (France) A Hesse	6	7^{7}
