= 2022 ITF Féminin Le Neubourg – Doubles =

Doubles
- 2022 ITF Féminin Le Neubourg

Final
- Champions: (United Kingdom) Freya Christie (United Kingdom) Ali Collins
- Runners-up: (Poland) Weronika Falkowska (United Kingdom) Sarah Beth Grey
- Score: 1–6, 7–6^{(7–4)}, [10–3]

Events
Singles	Doubles
← 2021 ·	ITF Féminin Le Neubourg	· 2023 →

Robin Anderson and Amandine Hesse were the defending champions but chose not to participate.

Freya Christie and Ali Collins won the title, defeating Weronika Falkowska and Sarah Beth Grey in the final, 1–6, 7–6^{(7–4)}, [10–3].

== Seeds ==
1. (Belgium) Ysaline Bonaventure / (France) Estelle Cascino (semifinals)
2. (Poland) Weronika Falkowska / (United Kingdom) Sarah Beth Grey (final)
3. (United Kingdom) Emily Appleton / (Poland) Martyna Kubka (quarterfinals)
4. (United Kingdom) Freya Christie / (United Kingdom) Ali Collins (champions)

== Draw ==
=== Key ===
- Q = Qualifier
- WC = Wild card
- LL = Lucky loser
- Alt = Alternate
- SE = Special exempt
- PR = Protected ranking
- ITF = ITF entry
- JE = Junior exempt
- w/o = Walkover
- r = Retired
- d = Defaulted
- SR = Special ranking

=== Draw ===
First round
(France) A Albié (Belgium) M Kempen	6^{3}	6	[10]
(France) M Szostak (France) A Tubello	7^{7}	4	[2]
(Spain) L Cortez Llorca (Chile) D Seguel	3	1
(Germany) J Jebawy (South Korea) S-h Park	6	6
(China) Jin Lu (France) M Partaud
(Ukraine) M Kolb (Ukraine) N Kolb	w/o
(France) E Jacquemot (United Kingdom) S Kartal	w/o
(France) L Nguyen Tan (France) M Rouvroy

Quarterfinals
1	(Belgium) Y Bonaventure (France) E Cascino	6	6
(France) A Albié (Belgium) M Kempen	2	4
4	(United Kingdom) F Christie (United Kingdom) A Collins	6	6
(Germany) J Jebawy (South Korea) S-h Park	3	1
(Ukraine) M Kolb (Ukraine) N Kolb	3	7	[10]
3	(United Kingdom) E Appleton (Poland) M Kubka	6	5	[5]
(France) E Jacquemot (United Kingdom) S Kartal
2	(Poland) W Falkowska (United Kingdom) SB Grey	w/o

Semifinals
1	(Belgium) Y Bonaventure (France) E Cascino	4	6	[8]
4	(United Kingdom) F Christie (United Kingdom) A Collins	6	4	[10]
(Ukraine) M Kolb (Ukraine) N Kolb	6^{4}	3
2	(Poland) W Falkowska (United Kingdom) SB Grey	7^{7}	6

Final
4	(United Kingdom) F Christie (United Kingdom) A Collins	1	7^{7}	[10]
2	(Poland) W Falkowska (United Kingdom) SB Grey	6	6^{4}	[3]
