= 2022 Internationaux de Strasbourg =

- Date: 15–21 May
- Edition: 36th
- Category: WTA 250
- Draw: 32S / 16D
- Prize money: $251,750
- Surface: Clay
- Location: Strasbourg, France
- Venue: Tennis Club de Strasbourg

Champions

Singles
- (Germany) Angelique Kerber

Doubles
- (United States) Nicole Melichar-Martinez / (Australia) Daria Saville
← 2021 ·	Internationaux de Strasbourg	· 2023 →

The 2022 Internationaux de Strasbourg was a professional tennis tournament played on outdoor clay courts in Strasbourg, France. It was the 36th edition of the tournament and part of the WTA 250 tournaments of the 2022 WTA Tour. It took place at the Tennis Club de Strasbourg between 15 and 21 May 2022.

== Finals ==
=== Singles ===
- (Germany) Angelique Kerber def. (Slovenia) Kaja Juvan 7–6^{(7–5)}, 6–7^{(0–7)}, 7–6^{(7–5)}

This is Kerber's first title of the year and 14th of her career.

=== Doubles ===
- (United States) Nicole Melichar-Martinez / (Australia) Daria Saville def. (Czech Republic) Lucie Hradecká / (India) Sania Mirza, 5–7, 7–5, [10–6]

== Singles main-draw entrants ==
=== Seeds ===
Country	Player	Rank^{1}	Seed
CZE	Karolína Plíšková	6	1
GER	Angelique Kerber	19	2
ROU	Sorana Cîrstea	26	3
BEL	Elise Mertens	33	4
CHN	Zhang Shuai	42	5
USA	Sloane Stephens	49	6
~~CZE~~	~~Tereza Martincová~~	~~53~~	~~7~~
POL	Magda Linette	54	8
SUI	Viktorija Golubic	56	9

- Rankings are as of 9 May 2022.

=== Other entrants ===
The following players received wildcards into the singles main draw:

- (Germany) Angelique Kerber
- (France) Carole Monnet
- (Czech Republic) Karolína Plíšková
- (Australia) Samantha Stosur

The following player received entry using a protected ranking into the singles main draw:

- (Australia) Daria Saville

The following players received entry from the qualifying draw:

- (France) Julie Gervais
- (Israel) Lina Glushko
- Ekaterina Makarova
- Aliaksandra Sasnovich

The following players received entry as lucky losers:

- (Bosnia and Herzegovina) Nefisa Berberović
- Angelina Gabueva
- (Germany) Katharina Hobgarski
- (Germany) Yana Morderger

=== Withdrawals ===
Before the tournament

- Ekaterina Alexandrova → replaced by (Germany) Anna-Lena Friedsam
- (United States) Madison Brengle → replaced by (Croatia) Ana Konjuh
- (Italy) Camila Giorgi → replaced by (Bosnia and Herzegovina) Nefisa Berberović
- (Ukraine) Anhelina Kalinina → replaced by Angelina Gabueva
- (Czech Republic) Barbora Krejčiková → replaced by (Slovenia) Kaja Juvan
- (Czech Republic) Tereza Martincová → replaced by (Germany) Yana Morderger
- (Latvia) Jeļena Ostapenko → replaced by (France) Harmony Tan
- (Italy) Jasmine Paolini → replaced by (United Kingdom) Heather Watson
- (United States) Alison Riske → replaced by (United States) Bernarda Pera
- (United States) Shelby Rogers → replaced by (France) Océane Dodin
- (Kazakhstan) Elena Rybakina → replaced by (France) Diane Parry
- (Czech Republic) Kateřina Siniaková → replaced by Varvara Gracheva
- (Denmark) Clara Tauson → replaced by (Belgium) Maryna Zanevska
- (Switzerland) Jil Teichmann → replaced by (Germany) Katharina Hobgarski
- (Czech Republic) Markéta Vondroušová → replaced by (France) Fiona Ferro

== Doubles main-draw entrants ==
=== Seeds ===
Country	Player	Country	Player	Rank^{1}	Seed
CZE	Lucie Hradecká	IND	Sania Mirza	52	1
JPN	Shuko Aoyama	TPE	Chan Hao-ching	54	2
CHN	Xu Yifan	CHN	Yang Zhaoxuan	69	3
TPE	Latisha Chan	AUS	Samantha Stosur	79	4

- ^{1} Rankings as of 9 May 2022.

=== Other entrants ===
The following pair received entry using a protected ranking:

- (Netherlands) Bibiane Schoofs / (Netherlands) Rosalie van der Hoek

=== Withdrawals ===
Before the tournament

- (Belgium) Kirsten Flipkens / (United States) Nicole Melichar-Martinez → replaced by (United States) Nicole Melichar-Martinez / (Australia) Daria Saville
