= 2025 Le Neubourg Open International =

Tennis tournament

- Date: 8–14 September 2025
- Edition: 5th
- Category: ITF Women's World Tennis Tour
- Prize money: $60,000
- Surface: Hard / Outdoor
- Location: Le Neubourg, France

Champions

Singles
- (Belgium) Greet Minnen

Doubles
- (United Kingdom) Naiktha Bains / (India) Rutuja Bhosale
- ITF Féminin Le Neubourg

The 2025 Le Neubourg Open International, branded as the 2025 Open Big Mat Le Neubourg Guillarmic Agencement for sponsorship reasons, is a professional tennis tournament played on outdoor hard courts. It was the fifth edition of the tournament, which was part of the 2025 ITF Women's World Tennis Tour. It take place in Le Neubourg, France, between 8 and 14 September 2025.

== Champions ==
=== Singles ===
- (Belgium) Greet Minnen def. (Croatia) Petra Marčinko, 6–2, 6–1

=== Doubles ===
- (United Kingdom) Naiktha Bains / (India) Rutuja Bhosale def. Polina Iatcenko / Sofya Lansere, 6–2, 1–6, [10–6]

== Singles main draw entrants ==
=== Seeds ===
Country	Player	Rank	Seed
BEL	Greet Minnen	106	1
CRO	Petra Marčinko	114	2
BEL	Sofia Costoulas	181	3
LTU	Justina Mikulskytė	199	4
FRA	Tessah Andrianjafitrimo	225	5
GBR	Lily Miyazaki	267	6
FRA	Harmony Tan	272	7
USA	Ayana Akli	283	8

- Rankings are as of 25 August 2025.

=== Other entrants ===
The following players received wildcards into the singles main draw:

- (France) Manon Arcangioli
- (France) Seda Baslilar
- (France) Jenny Lim
- (France) Alyssa Réguer

The following players received entry from the qualifying draw:

- (United Kingdom) Victoria Allen
- (Germany) Gina Marie Dittmann
- (France) Georgia Kalamaris
- Sofya Lansere
- (France) Alizé Lim
- Vlada Mincheva
- (France) Marine Szostak
- (Germany) Mariella Thamm
