= 2023 ITF Féminin Le Neubourg – Doubles =

Doubles
- 2023 ITF Féminin Le Neubourg

Final
- Champions: (France) Fiona Ferro; Alina Korneeva
- Runners-up: (Ukraine) Maryna Kolb (Ukraine) Nadiya Kolb
- Score: 7–6^{(9–7)}, 7–5

Events
Singles	Doubles
← 2022 ·	ITF Féminin Le Neubourg	· 2024 →

Freya Christie and Ali Collins is the defending champions but Christie chose to compete at 2023 Zavarovalnica Sava Ljubljana and Collins chose not to participate.

Fiona Ferro and Alina Korneeva won the title, defeating Maryna Kolb and Nadiya Kolb in the final, 7–6^{(9–7)}, 7–5.

== Seeds ==
1. (United Kingdom) Emily Appleton / (Netherlands) Isabelle Haverlag (semifinals)
2. (Croatia) Mariana Dražić / (Hungary) Adrienn Nagy (quarterfinals)
3. (United States) Chiara Scholl / (Romania) Arina Gabriela Vasilescu (quarterfinals)
4. (Spain) Lucía Cortez Llorca / (United Kingdom) Sarah Beth Grey (quarterfinals)

== Draw ==
=== Key ===
- Q = Qualifier
- WC = Wild card
- LL = Lucky loser
- Alt = Alternate
- ITF = ITF entry
- PR = Protected ranking
- SR = Special ranking
- SE = Special exempt
- JE = Junior exempt
- JR = Junior Accelerator Programme entrant
- CO = College Accelerator Programme entrant
- NG = Next Gen Accelerator Program entrant
- w/o = Walkover
- r = Retired
- d = Defaulted

=== Draw ===
First round
1	(United Kingdom) E Appleton (Netherlands) I Haverlag	6	6
(Switzerland) C Naef (France) A Robbe	3	2
(United Kingdom) M Brooks (United Kingdom) H Hutchinson	6	0	[11]
(Netherlands) I de Vroome (Belgium) M Kempen	1	6	[9]
3	(United States) C Scholl (Romania) AG Vasilescu	6	7
E Maklakova; K Zaytseva	4	5
(Ukraine) M Kolb (Ukraine) N Kolb	6	2	[10]
(Netherlands) L Pattinama Kerkhove (Poland) U Radwańska	1	6	[4]
(France) T Lemaître (India) V Shinde	w/o
WC	(France) D Martynov (France) A Monnot
(France) A Albié (France) M Rouvroy	4	2
4	(Spain) L Cortez Llorca (United Kingdom) SB Grey	6	6
WC	(Germany) J Jebawy (France) C Noël	4	2
(France) F Ferro; A Korneeva	6	6
WC	(France) N Berecoechea (Switzerland) V Ryser	6^{1}	7^{7}	[8]
2	(Croatia) M Dražić (Hungary) A Nagy	7^{7}	6^{1}	[10]

Quarterfinals
1	(United Kingdom) E Appleton (Netherlands) I Haverlag	6	7^{10}
(United Kingdom) M Brooks (United Kingdom) H Hutchinson	4	6^{8}
3	(United States) C Scholl (Romania) AG Vasilescu	5	6	[6]
(Ukraine) M Kolb (Ukraine) N Kolb	7	1	[10]
(France) T Lemaître (India) V Shinde	4	7^{7}	[10]
4	(Spain) L Cortez Llorca (United Kingdom) SB Grey	6	6^{4}	[7]
(France) F Ferro; A Korneeva	6	4	[10]
2	(Croatia) M Dražić (Hungary) A Nagy	2	6	[2]

Semifinals
1	(United Kingdom) E Appleton (Netherlands) I Haverlag	1	3
(Ukraine) M Kolb (Ukraine) N Kolb	6	6
(France) T Lemaître (India) V Shinde	4	3
(France) F Ferro; A Korneeva	6	6

Final
(Ukraine) M Kolb (Ukraine) N Kolb	6^{7}	5
(France) F Ferro; A Korneeva	7^{9}	7
