= 2021 Internationaux de Strasbourg =

- Date: 23–29 May
- Edition: 35th
- Category: WTA 250
- Draw: 32S / 16D
- Prize money: $235,238
- Surface: Clay
- Location: Strasbourg, France
- Venue: Tennis Club de Strasbourg

Champions

Singles
- (Czech Republic) Barbora Krejčíková

Doubles
- (Chile) Alexa Guarachi / (United States) Desirae Krawczyk
← 2020 ·	Internationaux de Strasbourg	· 2022 →

The 2021 Internationaux de Strasbourg was a professional tennis tournament played on outdoor clay courts in Strasbourg, France. It was the 35th edition of the tournament and part of the WTA 250 tournaments of the 2021 WTA Tour. It took place at the Tennis Club de Strasbourg between 23 and 29 May 2021.

== Finals ==
=== Singles ===
- (Czech Republic) Barbora Krejčíková def. (Romania) Sorana Cîrstea 6–3, 6–3

=== Doubles ===
- (Chile) Alexa Guarachi / (United States) Desirae Krawczyk def. (Japan) Makoto Ninomiya / (China) Yang Zhaoxuan 6–2, 6–3

== Singles main-draw entrants ==
=== Seeds ===
Country	Player	Rank^{1}	Seed
CAN	Bianca Andreescu	7	1
USA	Jessica Pegula	28	2
RUS	Ekaterina Alexandrova	34	3
KAZ	Yulia Putintseva	35	4
CZE	Barbora Krejčíková	38	5
CHN	Zhang Shuai	43	6
USA	Shelby Rogers	45	7
POL	Magda Linette	47	8

- Rankings are as of 17 May 2021.

=== Other entrants ===
The following players received wildcards into the singles main draw:

- (France) Clara Burel
- (France) Harmony Tan

The following players received entry from the qualifying draw:

- (France) Océane Dodin
- (Belarus) Yuliya Hatouka
- (Spain) Andrea Lázaro García
- (Germany) Jule Niemeier
- (France) Diane Parry
- (Belgium) Maryna Zanevska

=== Withdrawals ===
Before the tournament

- (United States) Danielle Collins → replaced by (Romania) Sorana Cîrstea
- (United States) Coco Gauff → replaced by (Japan) Misaki Doi
- (Russia) Veronika Kudermetova → replaced by (France) Caroline Garcia
- (Russia) Svetlana Kuznetsova → replaced by (Belgium) Alison Van Uytvanck
- (Russia) Anastasia Pavlyuchenkova → replaced by (Japan) Nao Hibino
- (Argentina) Nadia Podoroska → replaced by (United States) Christina McHale
- (United States) Alison Riske → replaced by (United States) Lauren Davis
- (Kazakhstan) Elena Rybakina → replaced by (Kazakhstan) Zarina Diyas
- (Spain) Sara Sorribes Tormo → replaced by (Sweden) Rebecca Peterson
- (Croatia) Donna Vekić → replaced by (Russia) Anna Blinkova
- (Czech Republic) Markéta Vondroušová → replaced by (France) Alizé Cornet
- (China) Wang Qiang → replaced by (Russia) Varvara Gracheva

During the tournament

- (Canada) Bianca Andreescu (abdominal injury)

=== Retirements ===
- (France) Alizé Cornet
- (France) Océane Dodin
- (France) Harmony Tan
- (Switzerland) Jil Teichmann

== Doubles main-draw entrants ==
=== Seeds ===
Country	Player	Country	Player	Rank^{1}	Seed
CHI	Alexa Guarachi	USA	Desirae Krawczyk	32	1
TPE	Chan Hao-ching	TPE	Latisha Chan	42	2
USA	Hayley Carter	BRA	Luisa Stefani	51	3
CHN	Xu Yifan	CHN	Zhang Shuai	54	4

- ^{1} Rankings as of 17 May 2021.

=== Other entrants ===
The following pairs received wildcards into the doubles main draw:

- (France) Clara Burel / (France) Diane Parry
- (France) Estelle Cascino / (France) Jessika Ponchet

The following pair received entry using a protected ranking:

- (Russia) Alexandra Panova / (Germany) Julia Wachaczyk

=== Withdrawals ===
Before the tournament

- (Japan) Shuko Aoyama / (Japan) Ena Shibahara → replaced by (Japan) Miyu Kato / (Czech Republic) Renata Voráčová
- (Russia) Anna Blinkova / (Ukraine) Lyudmyla Kichenok → replaced by (Russia) Anna Blinkova / (United States) Christina McHale
- (Ukraine) Nadiia Kichenok / (Romania) Raluca Olaru → replaced by (Russia) Ekaterina Alexandrova / (Russia) Yana Sizikova
- (Russia) Alla Kudryavtseva / (Russia) Alexandra Panova → replaced by (Russia) Alexandra Panova / (Germany) Julia Wachaczyk
- (United States) Nicole Melichar / (Netherlands) Demi Schuurs → replaced by (Germany) Vivian Heisen / (United States) Nicole Melichar
