= 2022 Internationaux de Strasbourg – Doubles =

Doubles
- 2022 Internationaux de Strasbourg

Final
- Champions: (United States) Nicole Melichar-Martinez (Australia) Daria Saville
- Runners-up: (Czech Republic) Lucie Hradecká (India) Sania Mirza
- Score: 5–7, 7–5, [10–6]

Events
Singles	Doubles
← 2021 ·	Internationaux de Strasbourg	· 2023 →

Nicole Melichar-Martinez and Daria Saville defeated Lucie Hradecká and Sania Mirza in the final, 5–7, 7–5, [10–6] to win the doubles tennis title at the 2022 Internationaux de Strasbourg.

Alexa Guarachi and Desirae Krawczyk were the defending champions but chose not to participate.

Elise Mertens was in contention for the world no. 1 doubles ranking, but she and partner Diane Parry lost in the semifinals to Melichar-Martinez and Saville.

== Seeds ==
1. (Czech Republic) Lucie Hradecká / (India) Sania Mirza (final)
2. (Japan) Shuko Aoyama / (Chinese Taipei) Chan Hao-ching (quarterfinals)
3. (China) Xu Yifan / (China) Yang Zhaoxuan (first round)
4. (Chinese Taipei) Latisha Chan / (Australia) Samantha Stosur (first round)

== Draw ==
=== Key ===
- Q = Qualifier
- WC = Wild card
- LL = Lucky loser
- Alt = Alternate
- SE = Special exempt
- PR = Protected ranking
- ITF = ITF entry
- JE = Junior exempt
- w/o = Walkover
- r = Retired
- d = Defaulted
- SR = Special ranking

=== Draw ===
First round
1	(Czech Republic) L Hradecká (India) S Mirza	3	6	[10]
(Ukraine) L Kichenok (Slovakia) T Mihalíková	6	3	[8]
(Ukraine) N Kichenok (Romania) R Olaru	6	7
PR	(Netherlands) B Schoofs (Netherlands) R van der Hoek	2	5
3	(China) Y Xu (China) Z Yang	3	6	[7]
(Poland) K Piter (Belgium) K Zimmermann	6	3	[10]
(United States) K Christian; L Marozava	6	6
A Fomina-Klotz; A Gabueva	0	1
(Germany) J Lohoff (Czech Republic) R Voráčová	3	1
(United States) N Melichar-Martinez (Australia) D Saville	6	6
(Ukraine) M Kostyuk (Romania) E-G Ruse	6	7
4	(Chinese Taipei) L Chan (Australia) S Stosur	2	5
(France) E Lechemia (United Kingdom) S Murray Sharan	1	4
(Belgium) E Mertens (France) D Parry	6	6
(Germany) V Heisen (United States) S Santamaria	1	6^{3}
2	(Japan) S Aoyama (Chinese Taipei) H-c Chan	6	7^{7}

Quarterfinals
1	(Czech Republic) L Hradecká (India) S Mirza	6	7^{7}
(Ukraine) N Kichenok (Romania) R Olaru	3	6^{4}
(Poland) K Piter (Belgium) K Zimmermann	6	3	[8]
(United States) K Christian; L Marozava	2	6	[10]
(United States) N Melichar-Martinez (Australia) D Saville	w/o
(Ukraine) M Kostyuk (Romania) E-G Ruse
(Belgium) E Mertens (France) D Parry	7^{7}	6
2	(Japan) S Aoyama (Chinese Taipei) H-c Chan	6^{5}	1

Semifinals
1	(Czech Republic) L Hradecká (India) S Mirza	6	6
(United States) K Christian; L Marozava	3	3
(United States) N Melichar-Martinez (Australia) D Saville	6	6
(Belgium) E Mertens (France) D Parry	3	3

Final
1	(Czech Republic) L Hradecká (India) S Mirza	7	5	[6]
(United States) N Melichar-Martinez (Australia) D Saville	5	7	[10]
