= 2021 Internationaux de Strasbourg – Doubles =

Doubles
- 2021 Internationaux de Strasbourg

Final
- Champions: (Chile) Alexa Guarachi (United States) Desirae Krawczyk
- Runners-up: (Japan) Makoto Ninomiya (China) Yang Zhaoxuan
- Score: 6–2, 6–3

Events
Singles	Doubles
← 2020 ·	Internationaux de Strasbourg	· 2022 →

Nicole Melichar and Demi Schuurs were the defending champions, but Schuurs chose not to participate. Melichar played alongside Vivian Heisen, but they lost in the semifinals to Alexa Guarachi and Desirae Krawczyk.

Guarachi and Krawczyk went on to win the title, defeating Makoto Ninomiya and Yang Zhaoxuan in the final, 6–2, 6–3.

== Seeds ==
1. (Chile) Alexa Guarachi / (United States) Desirae Krawczyk (champions)
2. (Chinese Taipei) Chan Hao-ching / (Chinese Taipei) Latisha Chan (quarterfinals)
3. (United States) Hayley Carter / (Brazil) Luisa Stefani (first round)
4. (China) Xu Yifan / (China) Zhang Shuai (quarterfinals)

== Draw ==
=== Key ===
- Q = Qualifier
- WC = Wild card
- LL = Lucky loser
- Alt = Alternate
- SE = Special exempt
- PR = Protected ranking
- ITF = ITF entry
- JE = Junior exempt
- w/o = Walkover
- r = Retired
- d = Defaulted
- SR = Special ranking

=== Draw ===
First round
1	(Chile) A Guarachi (United States) D Krawczyk	3	6	[10]
(Japan) N Hibino (Georgia (country)) O Kalashnikova	6	2	[8]
PR	(Russia) A Panova (Germany) J Wachaczyk	6	6
(United States) L Davis (Czech Republic) K Peschke	4	1
3	(United States) H Carter (Brazil) L Stefani	4	5
(Germany) V Heisen (United States) N Melichar	6	7
(Japan) M Kato (Czech Republic) R Voráčová	6	6
WC	(France) E Cascino (France) J Ponchet	3	3
(France) E Lechemia (United States) I Neel	6	6
(United States) K Christian (United States) S Santamaria	2	0
WC	(France) C Burel (France) D Parry	5	6^{4}
4	(China) Y Xu (China) S Zhang	7	7^{7}
(Russia) E Alexandrova (Russia) Y Sizikova	4	4
(Japan) M Ninomiya (China) Z Yang	6	6
(Russia) A Blinkova (United States) C McHale	6	6^{2}	[8]
2	(Chinese Taipei) H-c Chan (Chinese Taipei) L Chan	3	7^{7}	[10]

Quarterfinals
1	(Chile) A Guarachi (United States) D Krawczyk	6	5	[11]
PR	(Russia) A Panova (Germany) J Wachaczyk	3	7	[9]
(Germany) V Heisen (United States) N Melichar	6	6
(Japan) M Kato (Czech Republic) R Voráčová	1	3
(France) E Lechemia (United States) I Neel	6^{4}	7^{7}	[10]
4	(China) Y Xu (China) S Zhang	7^{7}	6^{2}	[7]
(Japan) M Ninomiya (China) Z Yang	6	2	[10]
2	(Chinese Taipei) H-c Chan (Chinese Taipei) L Chan	4	6	[5]

Semifinals
1	(Chile) A Guarachi (United States) D Krawczyk	6	6
(Germany) V Heisen (United States) N Melichar	4	4
(France) E Lechemia (United States) I Neel	6	5	[4]
(Japan) M Ninomiya (China) Z Yang	3	7	[10]

Final
1	(Chile) A Guarachi (United States) D Krawczyk	6	6
(Japan) M Ninomiya (China) Z Yang	2	3
