= 2021 ITF Féminin Le Neubourg – Singles =

Singles
- 2021 ITF Féminin Le Neubourg

Final
- Champion: (Romania) Mihaela Buzărnescu
- Runner-up: (Hungary) Anna Bondár
- Score: 6–1, 6–3

Events
| Singles | Doubles |
| ITF Féminin Le Neubourg | · 2022 → |

This was the first edition of the tournament.

Mihaela Buzărnescu won the title, defeating Anna Bondár in the final, 6–1, 6–3.

== Seeds ==
1. (Montenegro) Danka Kovinić (second round)
2. (France) Harmony Tan (second round)
3. (Romania) Mihaela Buzărnescu (champion)
4. (Hungary) Anna Bondár (final)
5. (France) Amandine Hesse (quarterfinals)
6. (Italy) Lucrezia Stefanini (first round)
7. (France) Jessika Ponchet (second round)
8. (Netherlands) Indy de Vroome (first round)

== Draw ==
=== Key ===
- Q = Qualifier
- WC = Wild card
- LL = Lucky loser
- Alt = Alternate
- SE = Special exempt
- PR = Protected ranking
- ITF = ITF entry
- JE = Junior exempt
- w/o = Walkover
- r = Retired
- d = Defaulted
- SR = Special ranking

=== Finals ===
Semifinals
(Netherlands) Arianne Hartono | 1 | 1
3 | (Romania) Mihaela Buzărnescu | 6 | 6
4 | (Hungary) Anna Bondár | 7^{7} | 6
(Russia) Oksana Selekhmeteva | 6^{4} | 0

Final
3 | (Romania) Mihaela Buzărnescu | 6 | 6
4 | (Hungary) Anna Bondár | 1 | 3

=== Top half ===
First round
1 | (Montenegro) D Kovinić | 6 | 4 | 6
(Turkey) P Özgen | 1 | 6 | 2
Q | (France) E Cascino | 1 | 4
(Netherlands) A Hartono | 6 | 6
Q | (France) A Albié | 3 | 4
(Italy) C Ferrando | 6 | 6
LL | (United States) C Scholl | 6^{6} | 1
7 | (France) J Ponchet | 7^{8} | 6
3 | (Romania) M Buzărnescu | 6 | 6
(Switzerland) Y In-Albon | 0 | 4
WC | (France) L Nguyen Tan | 6 | 6
(Spain) M Gutiérrez Carrasco | 2 | 1
Q | (Brazil) L Pigossi | 6 | 6
WC | (France) L Boisson | 3 | 2
(Romania) I Fetecău | 1 | 2
5 | (France) A Hesse | 6 | 6

Second round
1 | (Montenegro) D Kovinić | 6 | 6^{5} | 6^{5}
(Netherlands) A Hartono | 4 | 7^{7} | 7^{7}
(Italy) C Ferrando | 6^{5} | 6 | 6
7 | (France) J Ponchet | 7^{7} | 2 | 2
3 | (Romania) M Buzărnescu | 6 | 6
WC | (France) L Nguyen Tan | 3 | 2
Q | (Brazil) L Pigossi | 4 | 6 | 3
5 | (France) A Hesse | 6 | 2 | 6

Quarterfinals
(Netherlands) A Hartono | 6 | 6
(Italy) C Ferrando | 2 | 4
3 | (Romania) M Buzărnescu | 6^{3} | 6 | 6
5 | (France) A Hesse | 7^{7} | 2 | 2

Semifinals
(Netherlands) A Hartono | 1 | 1
3 | (Romania) M Buzărnescu | 6 | 6

=== Bottom half ===
First round
6 | (Italy) L Stefanini | 6^{5} | 6 | 5
(Australia) O Gadecki | 7^{7} | 2 | 7
PR | (Czech Republic) T Smitková | 6 | 2 | 3^{r}
Q | (United Kingdom) SB Grey | 4 | 6 | 5
Q | (Japan) M Kobori | 2 | 5
Q | (Belarus) I Shymanovich | 6 | 7
Q | (Belarus) A Kubareva | 2 | 5
4 | (Hungary) A Bondár | 6 | 7
8 | (Netherlands) I de Vroome | 6^{2} | 4
(Russia) O Selekhmeteva | 7^{7} | 6
JE | (Ukraine) D Snigur | 6 | 6
WC | (France) M Arcangioli | 3 | 2
Q | (France) A Rezaï | 3 | 0
(United States) R Anderson | 6 | 6
WC | (France) S Djoubri | 5 | 6^{2}
2 | (France) H Tan | 7 | 7^{7}

Second round
(Australia) O Gadecki | 6 | 6
Q | (United Kingdom) SB Grey | 3 | 3
Q | (Belarus) I Shymanovich | 3 | 6 | 5
4 | (Hungary) A Bondár | 6 | 2 | 7
(Russia) O Selekhmeteva | 7 | 3 | 7
JE | (Ukraine) D Snigur | 5 | 6 | 5
(United States) R Anderson | 6 | 2 | 6
2 | (France) H Tan | 3 | 6 | 0

Quarterfinals
(Australia) O Gadecki | 4 | 6 | 6^{5}
4 | (Hungary) A Bondár | 6 | 1 | 7^{7}
(Russia) O Selekhmeteva | 6 | 5 | 7^{7}
(United States) R Anderson | 4 | 7 | 6^{3}

Semifinals
4 | (Hungary) A Bondár | 7^{7} | 6
(Russia) O Selekhmeteva | 6^{4} | 0
