= Julie Gervais =

French tennis player (born 1991)

- Country (sports): France
- Born: 22 July 1991 (age 33)
- Plays: Right-handed
- Prize money: US$42,729

Singles
- Career record: 134–90
- Career titles: 3 ITF
- Highest ranking: No. 374 (18 November 2019)

Doubles
- Career record: 13–20
- Career titles: 0
- Highest ranking: No. 614 (3 February 2020)

Julie Gervais (born 22 June 1991) is a French former tennis player.

Gervais had career-high WTA rankings of 374 in singles and 614 in doubles. In her career, she won three singles titles at tournaments of the ITF Women's Circuit.

Gervais made her WTA Tour main-draw debut at the 2022 Internationaux de Strasbourg, where she received entry into the singles draw as a qualifier, losing to Aliaksandra Sasnovich in the first round.

== ITF Circuit finals ==
=== Singles: 5 (3 titles, 2 runner-ups) ===
Legend
$10/15,000 tournaments

Result	W–L	Date	Tournament	Tier	Surface	Opponent	Score
Win	1–0	Nov 2015	ITF Stockholm, Sweden	10,000	Hard (i)	(Ukraine) Anastasiya Shoshyna	6–1, 6–4
Win	2–0	Mar 2016	ITF Heraklion, Greece	10,000	Hard	(Russia) Polina Vinogradova	6–3, 7–6^{(5)}
Loss	2–1	Aug 2017	ITF Wanfercée-Baulet, Belgium	10,000	Clay	(Germany) Dana Kremer	3–6, 6–4, 1–6
Loss	2–2	Aug 2017	ITF Madrid, Spain	15,000	Clay	(Italy) Giorgia Marchetti	1–6, 6–2, 1–6
Win	3–2	Oct 2019	ITF Stockholm, Sweden	15,000	Hard (i)	(Sweden) Fanny Östlund	6–1, 6–3
