= 2023 ITF Féminin Le Neubourg – Singles =

Singles
- 2023 ITF Féminin Le Neubourg

Final
- Champion: (Switzerland) Céline Naef
- Runner-up: Alina Korneeva
- Score: 4–6, 6–2, 7–6^{(9–7)}

Events
Singles	Doubles
- ITF Féminin Le Neubourg

Céline Naef defeated Alina Korneeva in the final, 4–6, 6–2, 7–6^{(9–7)}, saving two championship points en route to the title.

Jaqueline Cristian was the defending champion, but chose to compete at the Țiriac Foundation Trophy instead.

== Seeds ==
1. (Italy) Lucrezia Stefanini (quarterfinals)
2. (France) Océane Dodin (semifinals, withdrew)
3. (Switzerland) Simona Waltert (second round)
4. (Switzerland) Céline Naef (champion)
5. (France) Fiona Ferro (semifinals)
6. (Hungary) Tímea Babos (quarterfinals)
7. Alina Korneeva (final)
8. (France) Alice Robbe (second round)

== Draw ==
Key

- Q = Qualifier
- WC = Wild card
- LL = Lucky loser
- Alt = Alternate
- ITF = ITF entry
- PR = Protected ranking
- SR = Special ranking
- SE = Special exempt
- JE = Junior exempt
- JR = Junior Accelerator Programme entrant
- CO = College Accelerator Programme entrant
- NG = Next Gen Accelerator Program entrant
- w/o = Walkover
- r = Retired
- d = Defaulted

=== Finals ===
Semifinals
5	(France) Fiona Ferro	5	5
7	Alina Korneeva	7	7
4	(Switzerland) Céline Naef	w/o
2	(France) Océane Dodin

Final
7	Alina Korneeva	6	2	6^{7}
4	(Switzerland) Céline Naef	4	6	7^{9}

=== Top half ===
First round
1	(Italy) L Stefanini	6	6
(Germany) M Barthel	2	1
(Switzerland) V Ryser	4	6	6
(Netherlands) L Pattinama Kerkhove	6	3	4
Q	(France) M Léonard	6	1	6
(France) M Rouvroy	4	6	4
WC	(France) M Arcangioli	0	0
5	(France) F Ferro	6	6
3	(Switzerland) S Waltert	6	7
WC	(France) N Berecoechea	3	5
WC	(France) T Lemaître	5	6	6
Q	(Turkey) P Özgen	7	3	2
(Chinese Taipei) J Garland	6	6
E Maklakova	4	0
Q	K Zaytseva	3	7	1^{r}
7	A Korneeva	6	5	4

Second round
1	(Italy) L Stefanini	6	6
(Switzerland) V Ryser	1	1
Q	(France) M Léonard	0	7^{7}	6^{2}
5	(France) F Ferro	6	6^{5}	7^{7}
3	(Switzerland) S Waltert	3	3
WC	(France) T Lemaître	6	6
(Chinese Taipei) J Garland	6	5	5
7	A Korneeva	2	7	7

Quarterfinals
1	(Italy) L Stefanini	2	3
5	(France) F Ferro	6	6
WC	(France) T Lemaître	2	1
7	A Korneeva	6	6

Semifinals
5	(France) F Ferro	5	5
7	A Korneeva	7	7

=== Bottom half ===
First round
8	(France) A Robbe	6	3	6
Q	(Denmark) O Helmi	2	6	2
(Poland) U Radwańska	7	2	0
WC	(France) J Lim	5	6	6
(France) A Albié	6^{4}	5
(Spain) L Cortez Llorca	7^{7}	7
Q	(Japan) M Kawamura	2	1
4	(Switzerland) C Naef	6	6
6	(Hungary) T Babos	4	6	6
(Belgium) M Kempen	6	2	4
Q	(Germany) J Stusek	6	7
Q	(Romania) A Vasilescu	2	5
(Denmark) J Svendsen	6	5	6
Q	(United Kingdom) SB Grey	3	7	0
LL	(Ukraine) N Kolb	3	4
2	(France) O Dodin	6	6

Second round
8	(France) A Robbe	1	1^{r}
WC	(France) J Lim	6	3
(Spain) L Cortez Llorca	5	1
4	(Switzerland) C Naef	7	6
6	(Hungary) T Babos	6	6
Q	(Germany) J Stusek	1	4
(Denmark) J Svendsen	1	6	2
2	(France) O Dodin	6	4	6

Quarterfinals
WC	(France) J Lim	7	1	5
4	(Switzerland) C Naef	5	6	7
6	(Hungary) T Babos	6^{5}	4
2	(France) O Dodin	7^{7}	6

Semifinals
4	(Switzerland) C Naef	w/o
2	(France) O Dodin
