= Tessah Andrianjafitrimo =

French tennis player (born 1998)

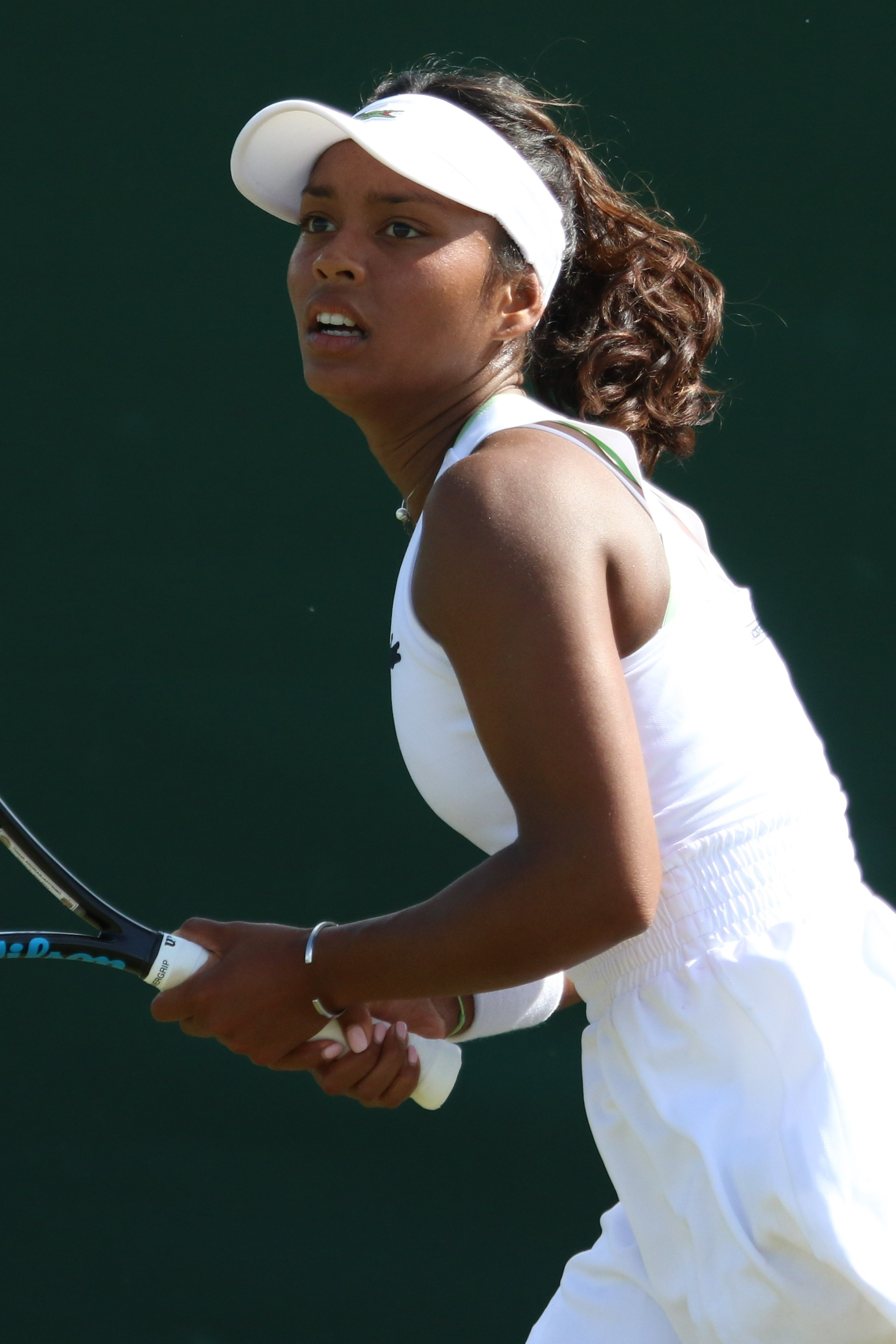
- Andrianjafitrimo at the 2022 Wimbledon Championships
- Country (sports): France
- Residence: Nogaro, France
- Born: 11 October 1998 (age 27) Montpellier, France
- Height: 1.69 m (5 ft 7 in)
- Plays: Right (two-handed backhand)
- Coach: Teddy Andrianjafitrimo
- Prize money: US$ 673,518

Singles
- Career record: 333–249
- Career titles: 9 ITF
- Highest ranking: No. 139 (20 June 2022)
- Current ranking: No. 860 (14 September 2026)

Grand Slam singles results
- Australian Open: Q2 (2021, 2022)
- French Open: 1R (2016, 2017, 2022)
- Wimbledon: Q2 (2022)
- US Open: Q2 (2025)

Doubles
- Career record: 45–69
- Career titles: 2 ITF
- Highest ranking: No. 389 (2 July 2018)

Grand Slam doubles results
- French Open: 1R (2016, 2017, 2018, 2020, 2022, 2023)

Grand Slam mixed doubles results
- French Open: 1R (2018, 2022, 2024)
- Last updated on: 16 September 2026.

Tessah Andrianjafitrimo (born 11 October 1998) is a French professional tennis player of Malagasy descent, born in Montpellier, France.

On 20 June 2022, she achieved her best WTA singles ranking of 139. Andrianjafitrimo up to date has won nine singles and two doubles titles on the ITF Circuit.

== Early life ==
Tessah was born in Montpellier and has two younger siblings. Her father, Teddy Andrianjafitrimo, was born in Madagascar. Teddy was an excellent tennis player. A tennis champion of Madagascar and Africa, he did not become a professional player because he lacked the financial support to do so. He emigrated to France and worked as a club coach and as his daughter's coach.

== Career ==
=== Juniors ===
Andrianjafitrimo started playing tennis when she was five years old. She was the 2014 national girls' champion of France in the 15–16 year-olds category. She had a career-high combined junior ranking of world No. 29, attained on 14 September 2015.

=== 2013–2014 ===
Andrianjafitrimo made her ITF Women's Circuit debut in September 2013 at the $25k indoor hardcourt tournament held in Clermont-Ferrand, France; she only entered that tournament's singles event, losing in the first qualifying round. She played a total of seven ITF Circuit events in 2013 and 2014.

=== 2015–2016 ===
Andrianjafitrimo made her major singles debut thanks to a wildcard at the 2015 French Open qualifying, where she defeated Patricia Mayr-Achleitner in the first round, before losing to Olivia Rogowska.

She also made her WTA Tour singles main-draw debut at the Luxembourg Open thanks to a wildcard, losing her first-round match to Tatjana Maria. Three weeks later, Andrianjafitrimo made her WTA 125 singles debut at the Open de Limoges; she entered the singles main draw as a wildcard and lost her first-round match to Carina Witthöft.

She received a wildcard for the singles main draw of the 2016 French Open (her major singles main-draw debut), where she lost 0–6, 0–6 to the unseeded Wang Qiang. She also played in the girls' singles main draw of the French Open, losing in the second round to Lucrezia Stefanini.

=== 2019 ===
In the French Open qualifying, Andrianjafitrimo failed to convert two match points in the third set of her first-round match against Rebecca Marino, who finally won 6–7, 6–4, 7–5.

== Personal life ==
Andrianjafitrimo has lived in Nogaro since 2010. She is in a relationship with French tennis player Ugo Humbert, and while out with injury she has filled in as his coach in 2020 and 2024.

== Grand Slam performance timelines ==
Key
| W | F | SF | QF | #R | RR | Q# | P# | DNQ | A | Z# | PO | G | S | B | NMS | NTI | P | NH |

(W) winner; (F) finalist; (SF) semifinalist; (QF) quarterfinalist; (#R) rounds 4, 3, 2, 1; (RR) round-robin stage; (Q#) qualification round; (P#) preliminary round; (DNQ) did not qualify; (A) absent; (Z#) Davis/Fed Cup Zonal Group (with number indication) or (PO) play-off; (G) gold, (S) silver or (B) bronze Olympic/Paralympic medal; (NMS) not a Masters tournament; (NTI) not a Tier I tournament; (P) postponed; (NH) not held; (SR) strike rate (events won / competed); (W–L) win–loss record.
To avoid confusion and double counting, these charts are updated at the conclusion of a tournament or when the player's participation has ended.

=== Singles ===
| Tournament | 2015 | 2016 | 2017 | 2018 | 2019 | 2020 | 2021 | 2022 | 2023 | 2024 | 2025 | W–L |
|---|---|---|---|---|---|---|---|---|---|---|---|---|
| Australian Open | A | A | A | A | A | A | Q2 | Q2 | A | A | A | 0–0 |
| French Open | Q2 | 1R | 1R | Q1 | Q1 | Q2 | Q1 | 1R | A | A | Q1 | 0–3 |
| Wimbledon | A | A | A | A | A | NH | A | Q2 | A | A | Q1 | 0–0 |
| US Open | A | A | A | A | A | A | Q1 | Q1 | A | A | Q2 | 0–0 |
| Win–loss | 0–0 | 0–1 | 0–1 | 0–0 | 0–0 | 0–0 | 0–0 | 0–1 | 0–0 | 0–0 | 0–0 | 0–3 |

== ITF Circuit finals ==
=== Singles: 17 (9 titles, 8 runner-ups) ===
| Legend W75 tournaments W25/35 tournaments W10/15 tournaments | Finals by surface Hard (6–4) Clay (3–4) |

| Result | W–L | Date | Tournament | Tier | Surface | Opponent | Score |
|---|---|---|---|---|---|---|---|
| Loss | 0–1 | Aug 2015 | ITF Valladolid, Spain | 10k | Hard | (Spain) María Luque Moreno | 2–6, 2–6 |
| Win | 1–1 | Dec 2015 | Lagos Open, Nigeria | 25k | Hard | (Slovenia) Tadeja Majerič | 6–3, 5–7, 6–4 |
| Loss | 1–2 | Apr 2016 | ITF Pula, Italy | 10k | Clay | (Italy) Jasmine Paolini | 1–0 ret. |
| Win | 2–2 | Aug 2016 | ITF Vinkovci, Croatia | 10k | Clay | (Chile) Ivania Martinich | 6–4, 6–1 |
| Win | 3–2 | Apr 2017 | ITF Hammamet, Tunisia | 15k | Clay | (Italy) Camilla Scala | 6–2, 6–4 |
| Loss | 3–3 | Dec 2017 | ITF Nules, Spain | 25k | Clay | (Australia) Isabelle Wallace | 1–6, 6–4, 3–6 |
| Win | 4–3 | Jun 2019 | ITF Périgueux, France | W25 | Clay | (France) Alice Ramé | 6–7^{(5–7)}, 6–2, 6–2 |
| Loss | 4–4 | Sep 2019 | ITF Santa Margherita di Pula, Italy | W25 | Clay | (Japan) Yuki Naito | 6–3, 5–7, 2–6 |
| Win | 5–4 | Jun 2021 | ITF Figueira da Foz, Portugal | W25 | Hard | (France) Jessika Ponchet | 6–7^{(3–7)}, 6–1, 6–0 |
| Loss | 5–5 | Jul 2021 | Telavi Open, Georgia | W25 | Clay | (Greece) Valentini Grammatikopoulou | 5–7, 4–6 |
| Win | 6–5 | Mar 2022 | ITF Guayaquil, Ecuador | W25 | Hard | (United States) Hanna Chang | 6–3, 6–3 |
| Loss | 6–6 | Apr 2022 | ITF Calvi, France | W25+H | Hard | (France) Léolia Jeanjean | 2–6, 2–6 |
| Loss | 6–7 | July 2024 | Porto Open, Portugal | W75 | Hard | (Poland) Maja Chwalińska | 5–7, 1–6 |
| Win | 7–7 | Aug 2024 | ITF Vigo, Spain | W35 | Hard | (Japan) Misaki Matsuda | 6–4, 6–3 |
| Win | 8–7 | Sep 2024 | ITF Le Neubourg, France | W75 | Hard | (France) Manon Léonard | 6–2, 6–4 |
| Win | 9–7 | Feb 2025 | Burnie International, Australia | W35 | Hard | (China) Guo Hanyu | 6–2, 6–3 |
| Loss | 9–8 | Apr 2025 | ITF Calvi, France | W75 | Hard | (Belgium) Sofia Costoulas | 5–7, 1–6 |

=== Doubles: 4 (2 titles, 2 runner-ups) ===
| Legend W75 tournaments W25 tournaments $10,000 tournaments | Finals by surface Hard (2–1) Grass (0–1) |

| Result | W–L | Date | Tournament | Tier | Surface | Partner | Opponents | Score |
|---|---|---|---|---|---|---|---|---|
| Win | 1–0 | Dec 2014 | ITF Djibouti City | 10k | Hard | (India) Ashmitha Easwaramurthi | (Belgium) Magali Kempen (China) Wang Xiyao | 3–6, 6–1, [10–8] |
| Win | 2–0 | Feb 2015 | ITF Port El Kantaoui, Tunisia | 10k | Hard | (Russia) Anna Blinkova | (Spain) Arabela Fernández Rabener (Netherlands) Eva Wacanno | 6–4, 6–0 |
| Loss | 2–1 | Mar 2017 | ITF Mildura, Australia | 25k | Grass | (France) Shérazad Reix | (Thailand) Noppawan Lertcheewakarn (China) Lu Jiajing | 4–6, 6–1, [8–10] |
| Loss | 2–2 | Feb 2025 | Brisbane QCT International, Australia | W75 | Hard | (Norway) Malene Helgø | (Japan) Miho Kuramochi (China) Zheng Wushuang | 6–7^{(6)}, 3–6 |
