= ITF Féminin Le Neubourg =

- 2025 Le Neubourg Open International

Women's World Tennis Tour
- Event name: ITF Féminin Le Neubourg
- Location: Le Neubourg, France
- Venue: Tennis Club Le Neubourg
- Category: ITF Women's World Tennis Tour
- Surface: Hard / Outdoor
- Draw: 32S/32Q/16D
- Prize money: $80,000+H
- Website: www.tennisclubleneubourg.com

The ITF Féminin Le Neubourg is a tournament for professional female tennis players played on outdoor hardcourts. The event is classified as a $80,000+H ITF Women's World Tennis Tour tournament and has been held in Le Neubourg, France, since 2021.

== Past finals ==
=== Singles ===
Year	Champion	Runner-up	Score
2026	(Czech Republic) Anna Sisková	(United States) Fiona Crawley	4–6, 6–2, 7–6^{(7–3)}
2025	(Belgium) Greet Minnen	(Croatia) Petra Marčinko	6–2, 6–1
2024	(France) Tessah Andrianjafitrimo	(France) Manon Léonard	6–2, 6–4
2023	(Switzerland) Céline Naef	Alina Korneeva	4–6, 6–2, 7–6^{(9–7)}
2022	(Romania) Jaqueline Cristian	(Belgium) Magali Kempen	6–4, 6–4
2021	(Romania) Mihaela Buzărnescu	(Hungary) Anna Bondár	6–1, 6–3

=== Doubles ===
Year	Champions	Runners-up	Score
2026	(United Kingdom) Naiktha Bains (India) Sahaja Yamalapalli	(Poland) Martyna Kubka (Czech Republic) Anna Sisková	3–6, 6–4, [11–9]
2025	(United Kingdom) Naiktha Bains (India) Rutuja Bhosale	Polina Iatcenko; Sofya Lansere	6–2, 1–6, [10–6]
2024	(Israel) Lina Glushko; Anastasia Tikhonova	Julia Avdeeva; Ekaterina Maklakova	6–3, 6–1
2023	(France) Fiona Ferro; Alina Korneeva	(Ukraine) Maryna Kolb (Ukraine) Nadiia Kolb	7–6^{(9–7)}, 7–5
2022	(United Kingdom) Freya Christie (United Kingdom) Ali Collins	(Poland) Weronika Falkowska (United Kingdom) Sarah Beth Grey	1–6, 7–6^{(7–4)}, [10–3]
2021	(United States) Robin Anderson (France) Amandine Hesse	(France) Estelle Cascino (United Kingdom) Sarah Beth Grey	6–3, 7–6^{(7–2)}
