= Lina Glushko =

Israeli tennis player (born 2000)

- Native name: לינה גלושקו
- Country (sports): Israel
- Residence: Modiin, Israel
- Born: 12 January 2000 (age 26) Israel
- Plays: Right-handed
- Prize money: US$ 228,864

Singles
- Career record: 204–146
- Career titles: 3 ITF
- Highest ranking: No. 201 (23 September 2024)
- Current ranking: No. 241 (17 March 2025)

Grand Slam singles results
- Australian Open: Q1 (2025)
- French Open: Q1 (2025)
- US Open: Q1 (2022)

Doubles
- Career record: 77–75
- Career titles: 5 ITF
- Highest ranking: No. 296 (22 May 2023)
- Current ranking: No. 429 (17 March 2025)

Team competitions
- Fed Cup: 17–15
- Last updated on: 17 March 2025.

Lina Glushko (Hebrew: לינה גלושקו; born 12 January 2000) is an Israeli tennis player. She has career-high WTA rankings of world No. 201 in singles and No. 296 in doubles.

She also represents Israel in the Billie Jean King Cup, where she has a win–loss record of 17–15 (as of June 2024).

== Biography ==
Glushko's USSR-born parents Sergio and Olga, sister Julia, and brother Alex immigrated to Israel from Ukraine in 1999, one year before she was born in Israel. She graduated from Ironi Gimel High School in Modiin, Israel.

She served in the Israel Defense Forces (IDF).

She is the younger sister of Julia Glushko (10 years older), who was also a professional tennis player (ranked as high as No. 79 in the world), and with whom she has teamed as a doubles partner. She was coached first by her father, and then by her brother.

== Career ==
In September 2017, Glushko won the inaugural Anna and Michael Kahan Family Prize in Ramat Hasharon, claiming NIS 100,000 in support; Glushko was able to use the money to purchase equipment and to travel abroad for tournaments and training camps. In 2018, she won the $15k Akko hardcourt tournament.

In 2021, she won the $25k Kiryat Motzkin hardcourt event. In doubles, Glushko and Alicia Barnett won the $15k Sharm El Sheikh hardcourt tournament, and she and Shavit Kimchi won the $25k Netanya hardcourt event.

In July 2022, at the $25k Corroios-Seixal hardcourt tournament, while ranked 268, Glushko upset No. 116 Vitalia Diatchenko.

Glushko made her WTA Tour debut at the 2022 Internationaux de Strasbourg, losing to Kaja Juvan in the first round.

In 2023, she and Emina Bektas won both the $25k Pretoria hardcourt tournament and the $60k Fukuoka carpet tournament.

In February 2024, she won the W50 Pretoria hardcourt, winning all five of her matches in straight sets, and also won the doubles title, with Gabriela Knutson, without dropping a set.

Having made it through qualifying at the WTA 125 2024 Polish Open, Glushko defeated sixth seed Kateryna Baindl and Carole Monnet to reach the quarterfinals, where her run was ended by Leonie Küng.

She entered the main draw of the WTA 500, the 2024 Monterrey Open as a lucky loser making her debut at this level and defeated qualifier Kateryna Volodko, before losing in the second round to ninth seed Magdalena Fręch in three sets.

== Performance timelines ==
Key
W	F	SF	QF	#R	RR	Q#	P#	DNQ	A	Z#	PO	G	S	B	NMS	NTI	P	NH

(W) winner; (F) finalist; (SF) semifinalist; (QF) quarterfinalist; (#R) rounds 4, 3, 2, 1; (RR) round-robin stage; (Q#) qualification round; (P#) preliminary round; (DNQ) did not qualify; (A) absent; (Z#) Davis/Fed Cup Zonal Group (with number indication) or (PO) play-off; (G) gold, (S) silver or (B) bronze Olympic/Paralympic medal; (NMS) not a Masters tournament; (NTI) not a Tier I tournament; (P) postponed; (NH) not held; (SR) strike rate (events won / competed); (W–L) win–loss record.
To avoid confusion and double counting, these charts are updated at the conclusion of a tournament or when the player's participation has ended.

Only main-draw results in WTA Tour, Grand Slam tournaments, Billie Jean King Cup, Hopman Cup, United Cup and Olympic Games are included in win–loss records.

=== Singles ===
Current through the 2022 Internationaux de Strasbourg.

Tournament	2022	2023	SR	W–L	Win %
Grand Slam tournaments
Australian Open	A	A	0 / 0	0–0	–
French Open	A	A	0 / 0	0–0	–
Wimbledon	A	A	0 / 0	0–0	–
US Open	Q1	A	0 / 0	0–0	–
Win–loss	0–0	0–0	0 / 0	0–0	–
WTA 1000
Dubai / Qatar Open (Note: The first Premier 5 event of the year has switched back and forth between the Dubai Tennis Championships and the Qatar Ladies Open since 2009. Dubai was classified as a Premier 5 event from 2009 to 2011 before being succeeded by Doha for the 2012–2014 period. In 2015, Dubai regained its Premier 5 status while Doha was demoted to Premier status. The Premier 5 tournaments were reclassified as WTA 1000 tournaments in 2021.)	A		0 / 0	0–0	–
Indian Wells Open	A		0 / 0	0–0	–
Miami Open	A		0 / 0	0–0	–
Madrid Open	A		0 / 0	0–0	–
Italian Open	A		0 / 0	0–0	–
Canadian Open	Q1		0 / 0	0–0	–
Cincinnati Open	A		0 / 0	0–0	–
Guadalajara Open	A		0 / 0	0–0	–
Career statistics
	2022		SR	W–L	Win %
Tournaments	1		Career total: 1		
Titles	0		Career total: 0		
Finals	0		Career total: 0		
Hard win–loss	0–0		0 / 0	0–0	–
Clay win–loss	0–1		0 / 1	0–1	0%
Grass win–loss	0–0		0 / 0	0–0	–
Overall win–loss	0–1		0 / 1	0–1	0%
Win %	–		Career total: 0%		
Year-end ranking	293	296	$86,153		

== ITF Circuit finals ==
=== Singles: 10 (3 titles, 7 runner-ups) ===
Legend W60 tournaments (0–1) W40/50 tournaments (1–1) W25 tournaments (1–3) W15 tournaments (1–2)	Finals by surface Hard (3–7)

Result	W–L	Date	Tournament	Tier	Surface	Opponent	Score
Win	1–0	May 2018	ITF Akko, Israel	W15	Hard	(Germany) Caroline Werner	6–3, 6–3
Loss	1–1	Sep 2019	ITF Sajur, Israel	W15	Hard	(South Africa) Chanel Simmonds	5–7, 0–6
Loss	1–2	May 2021	ITF Ramat HaSharon, Israel	W15	Hard	(Switzerland) Valentina Ryser	5–7, 1–6
Win	2–2	Oct 2021	ITF Kiryat Motzkin, Israel	W25	Hard	(Switzerland) Joanne Züger	6–3, 6–4
Loss	2–3	Feb 2022	ITF Cancún, Mexico	W25	Hard	(Latvia) Darja Semenistaja	6–4, 6–7^{(5)}, 2–6
Loss	2–4	Apr 2022	ITF Pretoria, South Africa	W60	Hard	Anastasia Tikhonova	7–5, 3–6, 3–6
Loss	2–5	Jul 2022	ITF Corroios, Portugal	W25	Hard	(Netherlands) Lesley Pattinama Kerkhove	4–6, 4–6
Loss	2–6	Mar 2023	ITF Pretoria, South Africa	W25	Hard	(United States) Emina Bektas	6–3, 3–6, 6–7^{(6)}
Win	3–6	Feb 2024	ITF Pretoria, South Africa	W50	Hard	(France) Manon Léonard	6–3, 7–5
Loss	3–7	Apr 2024	ITF Lopota, Georgia	W50	Hard	(Belarus) Evialina Laskevich	4–6, 1–6

=== Doubles: 11 (6 titles, 5 runner-ups) ===
Legend W60/75 tournaments (1–0) W40/50 tournaments (1–0) W25 tournaments (2–1) W15 tournaments (1–4)	Finals by surface Hard (5–3) Clay (0–2) Carpet (1–0)

Result	W–L	Date	Tournament	Tier	Surface	Partner	Opponents	Score
Loss	0–1	June 2019	ITF Netanya, Israel	W15	Hard	(Israel) Shelly Bereznyak	(Kazakhstan) Yekaterina Dmitrichenko (Russia) Anastasia Zakharova	0–6, 4–6
Loss	0–2	Dec 2019	ITF Heraklion, Greece	W15	Clay	(Russia) Darya Astakhova	(Romania) Ilinca Dalina Amariei (Romania) Alessia Beatrice Ciucă	3–6, 3–6
Loss	0–3	Dec 2019	ITF Heraklion, Greece	W15	Clay	(Croatia) Oleksandra Oliynykova	(Hungary) Dorka Drahota-Szabó (Slovakia) Laura Svatíková	2–6, 4–6
Win	1–3	Apr 2021	ITF Sharm El Sheikh, Egypt	W15	Hard	(United Kingdom) Alicia Barnett	(Romania) Elena-Teodora Cadar (Australia) Olivia Gadecki	6–4, 6–2
Loss	1–4	May 2021	ITF Ramat HaSharon, Israel	W15	Hard	(Israel) Shavit Kimchi	(Switzerland) Jenny Dürst (Switzerland) Nina Stadler	6–1, 4–6, [6–10]
Win	2–4	Oct 2021	ITF Netanya, Israel	W25	Hard	(Israel) Shavit Kimchi	(Czech Republic) Linda Nosková (Sweden) Fanny Östlund	6–4, 6–2
Loss	2–5	Feb 2022	ITF Cancún, Mexico	W25	Hard	(Sweden) Jacqueline Cabaj Awad	(Ukraine) Kateryna Bondarenko (Canada) Carol Zhao	5–7, 7–6^{(5)}, [7–10]
Win	3–5	Mar 2023	ITF Pretoria, South Africa	W25	Hard	(United States) Emina Bektas	(Hungary) Tímea Babos (Spain) Georgina García Pérez	6–3, 4–6, [13–11]
Win	4–5	May 2023	Fukuoka International, Japan	W60	Carpet	(United States) Emina Bektas	(China) Ma Yexin (Australia) Alana Parnaby	7–5, 6–3
Win	5–5	Feb 2024	ITF Pretoria, South Africa	W50	Hard	(Czech Republic) Gabriela Knutson	(Belgium) Sofia Costoulas (Belgium) Hanne Vandewinkel	7–6^{(5)}, 7–6^{(4)}
Win	6–5	Sep 2024	ITF Féminin Le Neubourg, France	W75	Hard	Anastasia Tikhonova	Julia Avdeeva; Ekaterina Maklakova	6–3, 6–1
