= Naiktha Bains =

Australian-British tennis player (born 1997)

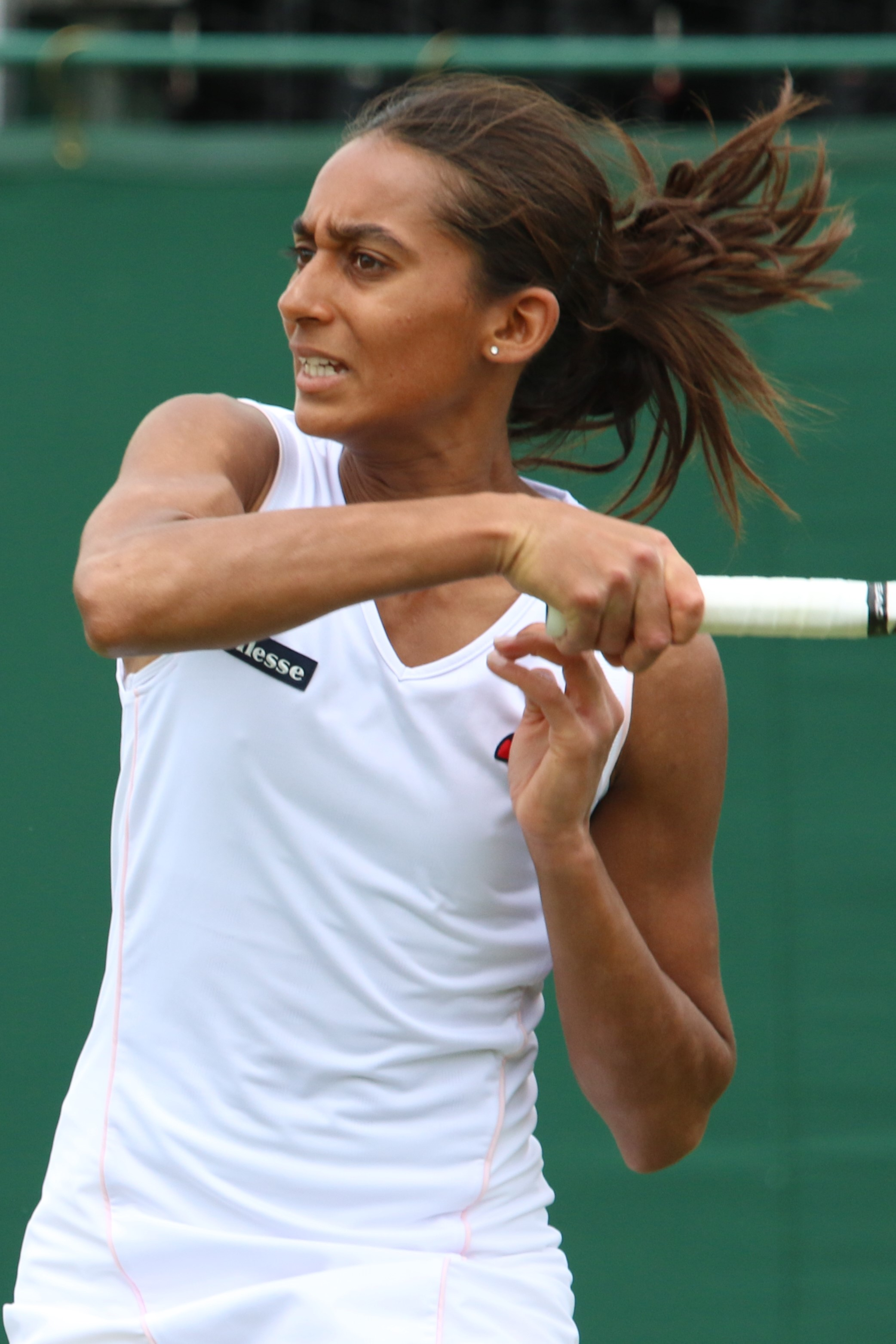
- Bains at the 2023 Wimbledon Championships
- Full name: Naiktha Kaur Bains
- Country (sports): Australia (2014–2019); Great Britain (2019–)
- Born: 17 December 1997 (age 28) Leeds, England, UK
- Plays: Right-handed
- Prize money: US$ 535,632

Singles
- Career record: 299–290
- Career titles: 2 ITF
- Highest ranking: No. 199 (6 January 2020)
- Current ranking: No. 349 (26 October 2026)

Grand Slam singles results
- Australian Open: Q3 (2019)
- Wimbledon: Q2 (2021, 2023)
- US Open: Q1 (2019)

Doubles
- Career record: 249–152
- Career titles: 28 ITF
- Highest ranking: No. 87 (9 October 2023)
- Current ranking: No. 369 (26 October 2026)

Grand Slam doubles results
- Australian Open: 1R (2014, 2015, 2016, 2018, 2019)
- Wimbledon: QF (2023)
- Last updated on: 26 October 2026.

Naiktha Bains (born 17 December 1997) is an Australian-British tennis player.

Bains has won two singles titles and 28 doubles titles on the ITF Women's Circuit. In January 2020, she reached her best WTA ranking of 199 in singles. On 9 October 2023, she peaked at No. 87 in the WTA doubles rankings.

== Personal life ==
Bains emigrated with her Indian-born father Gurnake from Britain to Brisbane aged eight and holds dual British-Australian citizenship.

Naiktha Bains was born in Leeds, United Kingdom, and now splits her time between Brisbane and her hometown. She trains in Brisbane and at the National Tennis Centre. Her family moved to Australia when she was eight years old due to her father Gurnake's work. Her mother, Harjit, and older brother, Gurpal — a music producer — remain a close part of her life. Naiktha enjoys watching football with her dad and is a passionate Leeds United supporter. She also loves cars, cooking with her mum, and spending time with family and friends. A standout moment in her tennis career so far was reaching the quarter-finals in the women’s doubles at Wimbledon 2023 alongside Maia Lumsden.

== Career ==
=== 2014 ===
Bains commenced the year with a ranking of 1041. She was awarded a wildcard into qualifying at the Hobart International where she made it through the first two rounds defeating Maria Elena Camerin and Teliana Pereira, before losing to eventual tournament champion, Garbiñe Muguruza, in the final round.

At the qualifying for the Australian Open, Bains lost to Andrea Hlaváčková in straight sets but together with Olivia Tjandramulia she was awarded a wildcard into the doubles main draw where they faced 14th-seeded team of Julia Görges and Barbora Záhlavová-Strýcová, also losing in straight sets.

In March, Bains was awarded a wildcard into the qualifying of the Miami Open, for just her third appearance at WTA Tour-level. She lost in round one to Virginie Razzano. Her next match was in September in Vegas, before playing four more ITF tournaments across Australia. She ended the year with a ranking of 713.

=== 2015 ===
Her season began with a wildcard entry into the qualifying rounds of the Brisbane International, Hobart International and Australian Open. She lost in round one in all three events. The rest of the year, Bains competed on the ITF Circuit, with limited success. She ended the year with a ranking of 630.

=== 2016–2017 ===
Bains commenced the season with a wildcard into the qualifying rounds of Brisbane, Hobart, and the Australian Open. She lost in the first round in all three events. Through February and March, she competed on the ITF Circuit across Australia, before heading to Croatia and Spain where she made three consecutive quarterfinals. From June to October, she competed on the ITF Circuit across Europe, Asia and Australia. Her best result was reaching the quarterfinals of the Bendigo International. Bains finished 2016 season ranked world No. 452.

Thanks to a wildcard, she entered the qualifying of the WTA 500 2017 Brisbane International but lost again in the first round, this time to Anastasia Rodionova.

=== 2023: Wimbledon quarterfinalist in doubles & top 100 debut ===
At Wimbledon, Bains partnered with Maia Lumsden, and the wildcard players became the first British pair to reach the quarterfinals in 40 years.

== Grand Slam performance timelines ==
Key
W	F	SF	QF	#R	RR	Q#	P#	DNQ	A	Z#	PO	G	S	B	NMS	NTI	P	NH

(W) winner; (F) finalist; (SF) semifinalist; (QF) quarterfinalist; (#R) rounds 4, 3, 2, 1; (RR) round-robin stage; (Q#) qualification round; (P#) preliminary round; (DNQ) did not qualify; (A) absent; (Z#) Davis/Fed Cup Zonal Group (with number indication) or (PO) play-off; (G) gold, (S) silver or (B) bronze Olympic/Paralympic medal; (NMS) not a Masters tournament; (NTI) not a Tier I tournament; (P) postponed; (NH) not held; (SR) strike rate (events won / competed); (W–L) win–loss record.
To avoid confusion and double counting, these charts are updated at the conclusion of a tournament or when the player's participation has ended.

=== Doubles ===
Tournament	2014	2015	2016	2017	2018	2019	2020	2021	2022	2023	2024	SR	W–L	Win%
Australian Open	1R	1R	1R	A	1R	1R	A	A	A	A	A	0 / 5	0–5	0%
French Open	A	A	A	A	A	A	A	A	A	A	A	0 / 0	0–0	–
Wimbledon	A	A	A	A	A	1R	NH	1R	2R	QF	1R	0 / 5	4–8	33%
US Open	A	A	A	A	A	A	A	A	A	A	A	0 / 0	0–0	–
Win–Loss	0–1	0–1	0–1	0–0	0–1	0–2	0–0	0–1	1–2	3–1	0–1	0 / 13	4–13	24%

== WTA Tour finals ==
=== Doubles: 1 (runner-up) ===
Legend WTA 500 WTA 250 (0–1)	Finals by surface Hard (0–0) Clay (0–1)

Result	W–L	Date	Tournament	Tier	Surface	Partner	Opponents	Score
Loss	0–1	Apr 2024	Open de Rouen, France	WTA 250	Clay (i)	(United Kingdom) Maia Lumsden	(Hungary) Tímea Babos; Irina Khromacheva	3–6, 4–6

== WTA 125 finals ==
=== Doubles: 1 (runner-up) ===
Result	W–L	Date	Tournament	Surface	Partner	Opponents	Score
Loss	0–1	Aug 2023	Kozerki Open, Poland	Hard	(United Kingdom) Maia Lumsden	(Poland) Katarzyna Kawa (France) Elixane Lechemia	3–6, 4–6

== ITF Circuit finals ==
=== Singles: 9 (2 titles, 7 runner-ups) ===
Legend W50 tournaments (0–1) W25/35 tournaments (1–6) W15 tournaments (1–0)	Finals by surface Hard (0–7) Clay (1–0) Grass (1–0)

Result	W–L	Date	Tournament	Tier	Surface	Opponent	Score
Win	1–0	May 2017	ITF Hammamet, Tunisia	W15	Clay	(Serbia) Natalija Kostić	6–4, 6–2
Win	2–0	Mar 2019	ITF Mildura, Australia	W25	Grass	(Australia) Kaylah McPhee	6–4, 6–7^{(5)}, 6–2
Loss	2–1	Dec 2019	ITF Solapur, India	W25	Hard	(India) Ankita Raina	3–6, 3–6
Loss	2–2	Dec 2019	Pune Championships, India	W25	Hard	(United Kingdom) Emma Raducanu	6–3, 1–6, 4–6
Loss	2–3	Oct 2022	ITF Cairns, Australia	W25	Hard	(Australia) Lizette Cabrera	7–5, 3–6, 2–6
Loss	2–4	Nov 2022	ITF Traralgon, Australia	W25	Hard	(Indonesia) Priska Madelyn Nugroho	4–6, 4–6
Loss	2–5	Feb 2025	ITF Timaru, New Zealand	W35	Hard	(Switzerland) Leonie Küng	1–6, 2–6
Loss	2–6	May 2025	ITF Nottingham, United Kingdom	W35	Hard	(Spain) Eva Guerrero Álvarez	2–6, 6–7^{(7)}
Loss	2–7	Jul 2026	ITF Nottingham, United Kingdom	W50	Hard	(United Kingdom) Alicia Dudeney	3–6, 6–7^{(5)}

=== Doubles: 54 (29 titles, 25 runner-ups) ===
Legend W100 tournaments (0–1) W50/60/75 tournaments (3–5) W40/50 tournaments (3–3) W25/35 tournaments (19–15) W10/15 tournaments (4–1)	Finals by surface Hard (21–19) Clay (8–5) Grass (0–1)

Result	W–L	Date	Tournament	Tier	Surface	Partner	Opponents	Score
Loss	0–1	Nov 2014	Bendigo International, Australia	50,000	Hard	(Australia) Karolina Wlodarczak	(Australia) Jessica Moore (Australia) Abbie Myers	4–6, 0–6
Loss	0–2	May 2016	ITF Bol, Croatia	10,000	Clay	(United States) Alexandra Morozova	(United States) Dasha Ivanova (Czech Republic) Petra Krejsová	1–6, 3–6
Win	1–2	May 2016	ITF Bol, Croatia	10,000	Clay	(United States) Dasha Ivanova	(France) Marine Partaud (France) Laëtitia Sarrazin	6–2, 4–6, [10–7]
Win	2–2	May 2016	ITF Bol, Croatia	10,000	Clay	(United States) Alexandra Morozova	(United States) Dasha Ivanova (Czech Republic) Petra Krejsová	6–1, 2–6, [10–7]
Loss	2–3	Sep 2016	ITF Tweed Heads, Australia	25,000	Hard	(Australia) Abbie Myers	(Australia) Monique Adamczak (Australia) Olivia Rogowska	6–7^{(6)}, 6–7^{(3)}
Win	3–3	Sep 2016	Brisbane QTC International, Australia	25,000	Hard	(Papua New Guinea) Abigail Tere-Apisah	(Israel) Julia Glushko (China) Liu Fangzhou	6–7^{(4)}, 6–2, [10–3]
Win	4–3	May 2017	ITF Hammamet, Tunisia	15,000	Clay	(Switzerland) Chiara Grimm	(Serbia) Natalija Stevanović (Bosnia and Herzegovina) Jelena Simić	4–6, 6–3, [10–4]
Win	5–3	May 2017	ITF Hammamet, Tunisia	15,000	Clay	(Slovakia) Tereza Mihalíková	(Italy) Francesca Bullani (Italy) Veronica Napolitano	4–6, 6–1, [10–5]
Loss	5–4	Jul 2017	ITF Middelburg, Netherlands	25,000	Clay	(United States) Dasha Ivanova	(Greece) Valentini Grammatikopoulou (Netherlands) Bibiane Schoofs	7–6^{(8)}, 5–7, [5–10]
Loss	5–5	Jul 2017	ITF Hua Hin, Thailand	25,000	Hard	(Switzerland) Karin Kennel	(Thailand) Luksika Kumkhum (Kyrgyzstan) Ksenia Palkina	3–6, 6–2, [12–14]
Loss	5–6	Aug 2017	ITF Tsukuba, Japan	25,000	Hard	(Chinese Taipei) Hsu Chieh-yu	(Japan) Miharu Imanishi (Japan) Akiko Omae	4–6, 4–6
Win	6–6	Sep 2017	ITF Penrith, Australia	25,000	Hard	(Papua New Guinea) Abigail Tere-Apisah	(Australia) Tammi Patterson (Australia) Olivia Rogowska	6–0, 7–5
Win	7–6	Sep 2017	Brisbane QTC International, Australia	25,000	Hard	(Papua New Guinea) Abigail Tere-Apisah	(United States) Jennifer Elie (Japan) Erika Sema	6–4, 6–1
Loss	7–7	Oct 2017	ITF Toowoomba, Australia	25,000	Hard	(Papua New Guinea) Abigail Tere-Apisah	(Japan) Momoko Kobori (Japan) Ayano Shimizu	5–7, 5–7
Win	8–7	Oct 2017	ITF Cairns, Australia	25,000	Hard	(Papua New Guinea) Abigail Tere-Apisah	(Australia) Astra Sharma (Australia) Belinda Woolcock	4–6, 6–2, [10–6]
Win	9–7	Apr 2018	ITF Santa Margherita di Pula, Italy	25,000	Clay	(United States) Chiara Scholl	(Belgium) Marie Benoît (China) Xu Shilin	6–4, 7–5
Win	10–7	Apr 2018	ITF Santa Margherita di Pula, Italy	25,000	Clay	(Netherlands) Rosalie van der Hoek	(Russia) Victoria Kan (Russia) Maria Zotova	6–2, 6–2
Win	11–7	May 2018	Open Saint-Gaudens, France	60,000	Clay	(United States) Francesca Di Lorenzo	(France) Manon Arcangioli (France) Sherazad Reix	6–4, 1–6, [11–9]
Loss	11–8	Jun 2018	Grado Tennis Cup, Italy	25,000	Clay	(Japan) Rika Fujiwara	(Italy) Giorgia Marchetti (Italy) Alice Matteucci	0–6, 4–6
Loss	11–9	Aug 2018	ITF Nonthaburi, Thailand	25,000	Hard	(Czech Republic) Barbora Štefková	(India) Rutuja Bhosale (India) Pranjala Yadlapalli	6–2, 0–6, [6–10]
Loss	11–10	Aug 2018	ITF Nonthaburi, Thailand	25,000	Hard	(Australia) Destanee Aiava	(China) Wang Xinyu (China) Wang Xiyu	5–7, 7–5, [4–10]
Loss	11–11	Aug 2018	ITF Tsukuba, Japan	25,000	Hard	(Japan) Hiroko Kuwata	(Japan) Akiko Omae (China) You Xiaodi	0–6, 6–7^{(4)}
Win	12–11	Sep 2018	ITF Cairns, Australia	25,000	Hard	(China) Xu Shilin	(New Zealand) Erin Routliffe (Australia) Astra Sharma	6–1, 7–6^{(7)}
Loss	12–12	Nov 2018	Canberra International, Australia	60,000	Hard	(Australia) Destanee Aiava	(Australia) Ellen Perez (Australia) Arina Rodionova	7–6^{(5)}, 3–6, [7–10]
Win	13–12	Mar 2019	Clay Court International, Australia	W25	Clay	(Slovakia) Tereza Mihalíková	(Australia) Destanee Aiava (Australia) Ellen Perez	4–6, 6–2, [10–4]
Loss	13–13	Mar 2019	Clay Court International 2	W25	Clay	(Slovakia) Tereza Mihalíková	(Australia) Alison Bai (Australia) Jaimee Fourlis	2–6, 2–6
Loss	13–14	May 2019	ITF Santa Margherita di Pula, Italy	W25	Clay	(Hungary) Anna Bondár	(Brazil) Gabriela Cé (United States) Chiara Scholl	0–6, 5–7
Loss	13–15	Aug 2019	GB Pro-Series Foxhills, United Kingdom	W25	Hard	(India) Ankita Raina	(United Kingdom) Sarah Beth Grey (United Kingdom) Eden Silva	2–6, 5–7
Win	14–15	Oct 2019	Brisbane QTC International, Australia	W25	Hard	(Australia) Destanee Aiava	(Australia) Alison Bai (New Zealand) Paige Hourigan	6–3, 6–3
Loss	14–16	Oct 2019	Bendigo International, Australia	W60	Hard	(Slovakia) Tereza Mihalíková	(Australia) Maddison Inglis (Australia) Kaylah McPhee	6–3, 2–6, [2–10]
Loss	14–17	Nov 2019	Playford International, Australia	W60	Hard	(Slovakia) Tereza Mihalíková	(United States) Asia Muhammad (Australia) Storm Sanders	3–6, 4–6
Win	15–17	May 2022	ITF Nottingham, United Kingdom	W25	Hard	(United Kingdom) Maia Lumsden	(Australia) Kimberly Birrell (Australia) Alexandra Osborne	3–6, 7–6^{(6)}, [11–9]
Loss	15–18	Jun 2022	Ilkley Trophy, UK	W100	Grass	(United Kingdom) Maia Lumsden	(Australia) Lizette Cabrera (South Korea) Jang Su-jeong	7–6^{(7)}, 0–6, [9–11]
Win	16–18	Jul 2022	ITF Roehampton, UK	W25	Hard	(United Kingdom) Maia Lumsden	(United Kingdom) Lauryn John-Baptiste (Slovakia) Katarína Strešnáková	6–1, 7–6^{(4)}
Loss	16–19	Aug 2022	GB Pro-Series Foxhills, UK	W25	Hard (i)	(United Kingdom) Maia Lumsden	(United Kingdom) Freya Christie (United Kingdom) Ali Collins	3–6, 3–6
Loss	16–20	Aug 2022	ITF Roehampton, UK	W25	Hard	(United Kingdom) Maia Lumsden	(India) Rutuja Bhosale (Japan) Erika Sema	6–4, 3–6, [9–11]
Win	17–20	Oct 2022	ITF Cairns, Australia	W25	Hard	(Australia) Alexandra Bozovic	(Australia) Destanee Aiava (Australia) Lisa Mays	6–4, 6–4
Win	18–20	Nov 2022	ITF Traralgon, Australia	W25	Hard	(Australia) Alana Parnaby	(Japan) Haruna Arakawa (Japan) Natsuho Arakawa	7–6^{(4)}, 6–2
Win	19–20	Feb 2023	Burnie International, Australia	W25	Hard	(Australia) Destanee Aiava	(Australia) Lily Fairclough (Australia) Olivia Gadecki	7–5, 6–3
Win	20–20	Apr 2023	ITF Nottingham, UK	W25	Hard	(United Kingdom) Maia Lumsden	(India) Ankita Raina (India) Rutuja Bhosale	6–1, 6–4
Win	21–20	Apr 2023	ITF Calvi, France	W40	Hard	(United Kingdom) Maia Lumsden	(India) Ankita Raina (France) Estelle Cascino	6–4, 3–6, [10–7]
Win	22–20	May 2023	ITF Nottingham, UK	W25	Hard	(United Kingdom) Maia Lumsden	(China) Lu Jiajing (Estonia) Elena Malõgina	4–6, 6–4, [10–6]
Loss	22–21	Jan 2024	Pune Open, India	W50	Hard	(Hungary) Fanny Stollár	(Philippines) Alexandra Eala (Latvia) Darja Semeņistaja	6–7^{(8)}, 3–6
Win	23–21	Jul 2024	ITF Nottingham, UK	W50	Hard	(United Kingdom) Amelia Rajecki	(United Kingdom) Katie Swan (United Kingdom) Mingge Xu	1–6, 6–4, [10–8]
Win	24–21	Aug 2024	ITF Aldershot, UK	W35	Hard	(United Kingdom) Mingge Xu	(Thailand) Punnin Kovapitukted (Japan) Akiko Omae	6–4, 6–3
Loss	24–22	Sep 2024	Perth International 2, Australia	W75	Hard	(India) Ankita Raina	(Japan) Sakura Hosogi (Japan) Misaki Matsuda	walkover
Loss	24–23	Nov 2024	ITF Caloundra, Australia	W50	Hard	(India) Ankita Raina	(Hong Kong) Eudice Chong (Hong Kong) Cody Wong	3–6, 2–6
Win	25–23	Jan 2025	ITF New Delhi, India	W50+H	Hard	(India) Ankita Raina	(United States) Jessie Aney (United States) Jessica Failla	6–4, 3–6, [10–8]
Win	26–23	Apr 2025	ITF Nottingham, UK	W35	Hard	(United Kingdom) Holly Hutchinson	(United Kingdom) Brooke Black (United Kingdom) Daniela Piani	6–3, 6–3
Loss	26–24	Apr 2025	ITF Nottingham, UK	W35	Hard	(United Kingdom) Holly Hutchinson	(France) Alice Robbe (Kosovo) Arlinda Rushiti	6–3, 4–6, [5–10]
Loss	26–25	Jul 2025	ITF Nottingham, UK	W50	Hard	(United Kingdom) Holly Hutchinson	(United Kingdom) Victoria Allen (United States) Amelia Rajecki	4–6, 6–4, [6–10]
Win	27–25	Aug 2025	ITF Roehampton, UK	W35	Hard	(India) Rutuja Bhosale	(United States) Mary Lewis (United States) Brandy Walker	4–6, 6–1, [12–10]
Win	28–25	Sep 2025	Le Neubourg Open, France	W75	Hard	(India) Rutuja Bhosale	Polina Iatcenko; Sofya Lansere	6–2, 1–6, [10–6]
Win	29–25	Sep 2026	Le Neubourg Open, France	W75	Hard	(India) Sahaja Yamalapalli	(Poland) Martyna Kubka (Czech Republic) Anna Sisková	3–6, 6–4, [11–9]
