= Le Neubourg =

- Commune
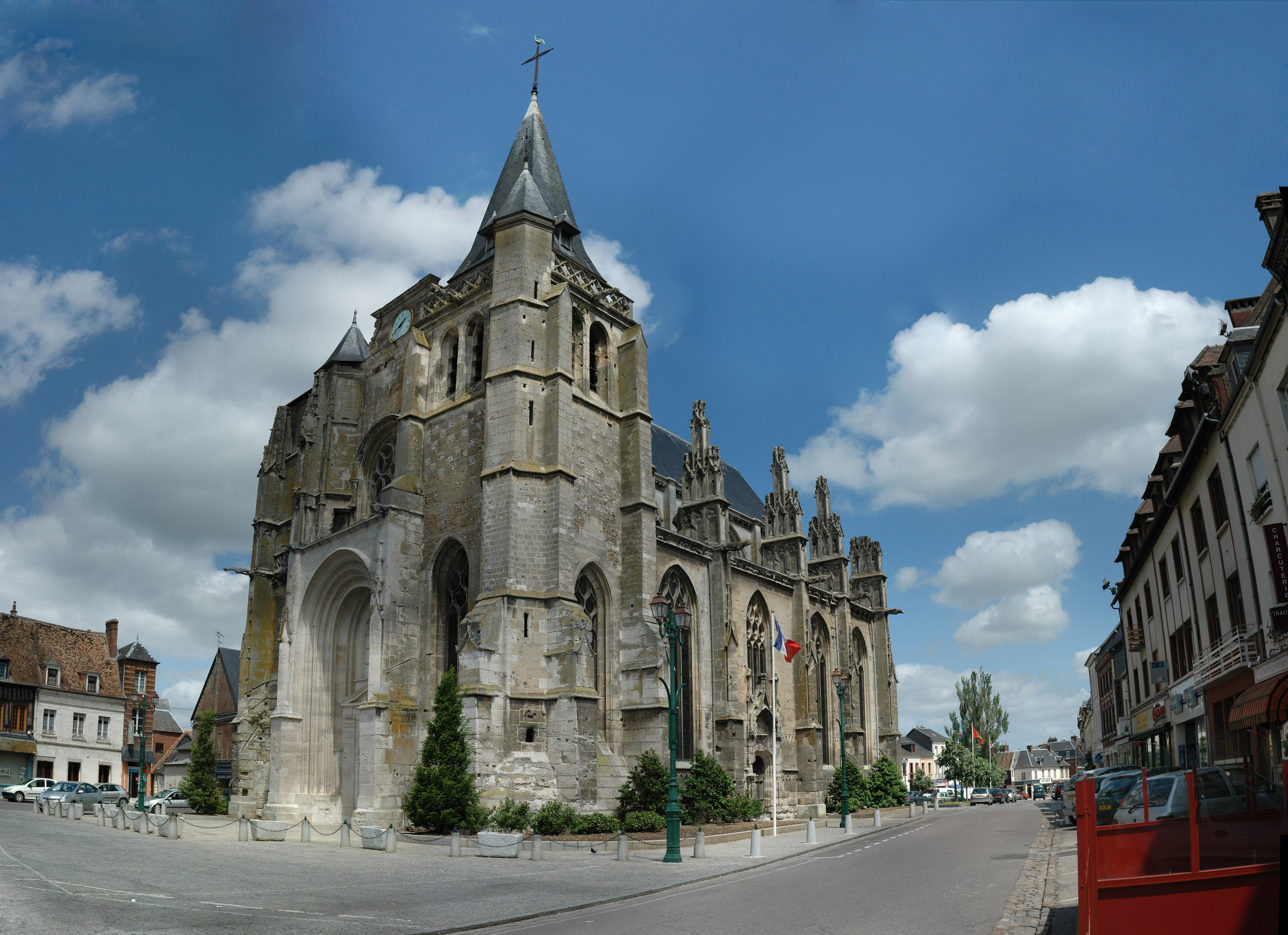
- The church in Le Neubourg

- Coat of arms
- Location of Le Neubourg
- Location within France Location within Normandy
- Coordinates: 49°08′56″N 0°54′14″E
- Country: France
- Region: Normandy
- Department: Eure
- Arrondissement: Bernay
- Canton: Le Neubourg
- Intercommunality: Pays du Neubourg

Government
  - Mayor (2020–2026): Isabelle Vauquelin
- Area^{1}: 9.91 km^{2} (3.83 sq mi)
- Elevation: 134 m (440 ft)
- Highest elevation: 151 m (495 ft)
- Lowest elevation: 110 m (360 ft)
- Population (2023): 4,199
  - Density: 424/km^{2} (1,100/sq mi)
- Time zone: UTC+01:00 (CET)
  - Summer (DST): UTC+02:00 (CEST)
- INSEE/Postal code: 27428 /27110
- ^{1} French Land Register data, which excludes lakes, ponds, glaciers > 1 km^{2} (0.386 sq mi or 247 acres) and river estuaries.

Le Neubourg is a commune in Eure, Normandy, France. The composer and organist Roger Boucher (1885–1918) was born in Le Neubourg.

== History ==
In the 11th century the manor of Le Neubourg was a subsidiary holding of Roger de Beaumont (d.1094), a principal adviser to William the Conqueror, and feudal lord of Beaumont-le-Roger situated 12 km to the SW. He gave the manor to his second son Henry de Beaumont (c.1048-1119), who was created 1st Earl of Warwick in 1088 and who adopted for himself and his descendants the surname "de Newburgh", the Anglicised adjectival form of his Norman lordship. The name was Latinised to de Novo Burgo, meaning "from the new borough/town".

== Population ==
Historical population
Year	Pop.	±% p.a.
1968	3,132	—
1975	3,498	+1.59%
1982	3,454	−0.18%
1990	3,639	+0.65%
1999	3,833	+0.58%
2007	4,046	+0.68%
2012	4,141	+0.47%
2017	4,166	+0.12%
2023	4,199	+0.13%
Source: INSEE

== See also ==
- Communes of the Eure department
