= 2023 Gold Coast Tennis International – Women's doubles =

Women's doubles
- 2023 Gold Coast Tennis International

Final
- Champion: (Australia) Roisin Gilheany (Australia) Maya Joint
- Runner-up: (Australia) Melisa Ercan (Australia) Alicia Smith
- Score: 7–6^{(7–3)}, 6–1

Events
Singles	men	women
Doubles	men	women
Gold Coast Tennis International	· 2024 →

This was the first edition of the tournament.

Roisin Gilheany and Maya Joint won the title, defeating Melisa Ercan and Alicia Smith in the final, 7–6^{(7–3)}, 6–1.

== Seeds ==
1. (Indonesia) Jessy Rompies / (India) Prarthana Thombare (quarterfinals)
2. (Australia) Talia Gibson / (Australia) Petra Hule (quarterfinals, withdrew)
3. (Australia) Destanee Aiava / (Australia) Maddison Inglis (first round)
4. (Indonesia) Beatrice Gumulya / (Australia) Olivia Tjandramulia (first round)

== Draw ==
=== Key ===
- Q = Qualifier
- WC = Wild card
- LL = Lucky loser
- Alt = Alternate
- SE = Special exempt
- PR = Protected ranking
- ITF = ITF entry
- JE = Junior exempt
- w/o = Walkover
- r = Retired
- d = Defaulted
- SR = Special ranking

=== Draw ===
First round
1	(Indonesia) J Rompies (India) P Thombare	6	6
Alt	(South Korea) D-y Back (United States) S Leon	3	2
(Japan) E Hayashi (Japan) E Shimizu	3	6	[10]
(Japan) S Imamura (Japan) S Ishii	6	4	[7]
3	(Australia) D Aiava (Australia) M Inglis	6^{2}	4
WC	(Australia) R Gilheany (Australia) M Joint	7^{7}	6
(Australia) E Bolton (Australia) E Jones	4	4
(Japan) E Sema (Japan) K Yoshioka	6	6
(Czech Republic) M Bayerlová (Australia) T McGiffin	7	6
(Japan) N Arakawa (Japan) H Sato	5	3
(Japan) M Kuramochi (Japan) H Kuwata	3	6	[10]
4	(Indonesia) B Gumulya (Australia) O Tjandramulia	6	4	[6]
(Australia) L Fairclough (Australia) O Gadecki	6^{5}	6	[7]
WC	(Australia) M Ercan (Australia) A Smith	7^{7}	3	[10]
WC	(Australia) E Micic (Australia) L Taylor	6^{8}	1
2	(Australia) T Gibson (Australia) P Hule	7^{10}	6

Quarterfinals
1	(Indonesia) J Rompies (India) P Thombare	2	7	[5]
(Japan) E Hayashi (Japan) E Shimizu	6	5	[10]
WC	(Australia) R Gilheany (Australia) M Joint	6	3	[10]
(Japan) E Sema (Japan) K Yoshioka	3	6	[6]
(Czech Republic) M Bayerlová (Australia) T McGiffin	6	4	[10]
(Japan) M Kuramochi (Japan) H Kuwata	3	6	[5]
WC	(Australia) M Ercan (Australia) A Smith	w/o
2	(Australia) T Gibson (Australia) P Hule

Semifinals
(Japan) E Hayashi (Japan) E Shimizu	7	0	[3]
WC	(Australia) R Gilheany (Australia) M Joint	5	6	[10]
(Czech Republic) M Bayerlová (Australia) T McGiffin	6	6^{7}	[9]
WC	(Australia) M Ercan (Australia) A Smith	4	7^{9}	[11]

Final
WC	(Australia) R Gilheany (Australia) M Joint	7^{7}	6
WC	(Australia) M Ercan (Australia) A Smith	6^{3}	1
