= 2024 Gold Coast Tennis International – Women's singles =

Women's singles
- 2024 Gold Coast Tennis International

Final
- Champion: (Australia) Daria Saville
- Runner-up: (Australia) Lizette Cabrera
- Score: 7–5, 7–6^{(7–3)}

Events
Singles	men	women
Doubles	men	women
← 2023 ·	Gold Coast Tennis International	· 2025 →

Talia Gibson was the defending champion, but lost in the quarterfinals to Lizette Cabrera.

Daria Saville won the title, defeating Cabrera in the final; 7–5, 7–6^{(7–3)}.

== Seeds ==
1. (Australia) Daria Saville (champion)
2. (Australia) Talia Gibson (quarterfinals)
3. (Australia) Maddison Inglis (quarterfinals)
4. (Australia) Priscilla Hon (semifinals)
5. (Japan) Kyōka Okamura (first round)
6. (China) Lu Jiajing (second round)
7. (Belgium) Sofia Costoulas (second round)
8. (Japan) Eri Shimizu (first round)

== Draw ==
=== Key ===
- Q = Qualifier
- WC = Wild card
- LL = Lucky loser
- Alt = Alternate
- SE = Special exempt
- PR = Protected ranking
- ITF = ITF entry
- JE = Junior exempt
- w/o = Walkover
- r = Retired
- d = Defaulted
- SR = Special ranking

=== Finals ===
Semifinals
1	(Australia) Daria Saville	6	1	[10]
4	(Australia) Priscilla Hon	4	6	[2]
(Australia) Emerson Jones	2	3
(Australia) Lizette Cabrera	6	6

Final
1	(Australia) Daria Saville	7	7^{7}
(Australia) Lizette Cabrera	5	6^{3}

=== Top half ===
First round
1	(Australia) D Saville	7	6
Q	(Japan) K Yoshioka	5	4
(Japan) H Sato	3	6	6
(Slovakia) N Vargová	6	3	4
Q	(China) Y Zhang	6	6
LL	(Japan) N Hanatani	2	2
(India) A Raina	3	2
7	(Belgium) S Costoulas	6	6
4	(Australia) P Hon	6	6
(Japan) R Saigo	4	4
(Hong Kong) C Wong	6	6
LL	(Chinese Taipei) F-a Lin	3	1
Q	(Chinese Taipei) Y-y Yang	4	3
(Hong Kong) E Chong	6	6
Q	(Netherlands) M Hoedt	3	3
6	(China) J Lu	6	6

Second round
1	(Australia) D Saville	6	6
(Japan) H Sato	3	2
Q	(China) Y Zhang	6	6
7	(Belgium) S Costoulas	2	3
4	(Australia) P Hon	6	6
(Hong Kong) C Wong	2	4
(Hong Kong) E Chong	4	6	6
6	(China) J Lu	6	2	4

Quarterfinals
1	(Australia) D Saville	6	1	7
Q	(China) Y Zhang	2	6	5
4	(Australia) P Hon	6	7^{7}
(Hong Kong) E Chong	2	6^{3}

Semifinals
1	(Australia) D Saville	6	1	[10]
4	(Australia) P Hon	4	6	[2]

=== Bottom half ===
First round
5	(Japan) K Okamura	0	2
(Australia) E Jones	6	6
SE	(Australia) A Bozovic	4	6^{6}
LL	(United Kingdom) N Bains	6	7^{8}
Q	(Japan) I Yamazaki	6	7
WC	(Australia) A Smith	3	5
(Australia) M Ercan	2	2^{r}
3	(Australia) M Inglis	6	3
8	(Japan) E Shimizu	6	2	3
Q	(Japan) R Matsuda	4	6	6
(Australia) L Cabrera	7^{7}	6
(India) S Bhamidipaty	6^{1}	2
(Australia) G Da Silva-Fick	6	4	6
Q	(Australia) L Taylor	4	6	2
Q	(Japan) H Arakawa	1	3
2	(Australia) T Gibson	6	6

Second round
(Australia) E Jones	6	6
LL	(United Kingdom) N Bains	1	0
Q	(Japan) I Yamazaki	2	1
3	(Australia) M Inglis	6	6
Q	(Japan) R Matsuda	3	2
(Australia) L Cabrera	6	6
(Australia) G Da Silva-Fick	2	2
2	(Australia) T Gibson	6	6

Quarterfinals
(Australia) E Jones	6	7
3	(Australia) M Inglis	4	5
(Australia) L Cabrera	7	6
2	(Australia) T Gibson	5	1

Semifinals
(Australia) E Jones	2	3
(Australia) L Cabrera	6	6
