= 2024 Gold Coast Tennis International – Women's doubles =

Women's doubles
- 2024 Gold Coast Tennis International

Final
- Champion: (Japan) Hikaru Sato (Japan) Eri Shimizu
- Runner-up: (Japan) Erina Hayashi (Japan) Kanako Morisaki
- Score: 6–7^{(0–7)}, 6–3, [10–6]

Events
Singles	men	women
Doubles	men	women
← 2023 ·	Gold Coast Tennis International	· 2025 →

Roisin Gilheany and Maya Joint were the defending champions, but chose not to participate.

Hikaru Sato and Eri Shimizu won the title, defeating Erina Hayashi and Kanako Morisaki in the final; 6–7^{(0–7)}, 6–3, [10–6].

== Seeds ==
1. (United Kingdom) Naiktha Bains / (India) Ankita Raina (quarterfinals)
2. (Hong Kong) Eudice Chong / (Hong Kong) Cody Wong (first round)
3. (Australia) Lizette Cabrera / (Slovakia) Nina Vargová (first round)
4. (Australia) Alexandra Osborne / (Australia) Alicia Smith (semifinals)

== Draw ==
Key

- Q = Qualifier
- WC = Wild card
- LL = Lucky loser
- Alt = Alternate
- ITF = ITF entry
- PR = Protected ranking
- SR = Special ranking
- SE = Special exempt
- JE = Junior exempt
- JR = Junior Accelerator Programme entrant
- CO = College Accelerator Programme entrant
- NG = Next Gen Accelerator Program entrant
- w/o = Walkover
- r = Retired
- d = Defaulted

=== Draw ===
First round
1	(United Kingdom) N Bains (India) A Raina	7	6
(Chinese Taipei) Y-y Li (China) Yi Zhang	5	3
(Japan) H Sato (Japan) E Shimizu	6	6^{2}	[10]
WC	(Australia) S Rokusek (Australia) L Taylor	3	7^{7}	[8]
4	(Australia) A Osborne (Australia) A Smith	6	6
(Japan) R Saigo (Japan) Y Saigo	4	4
(Chinese Taipei) Y-h Lee (Chinese Taipei) F-a Lin	6	5	[10]
(Australia) B Compuesto (Australia) N McKenzie	3	7	[5]
(New Zealand) M Barry (Belgium) S Costoulas	6	6
(Japan) A Nagata (Japan) I Yamazaki	3	2
Alt	(Japan) K Yoshioka (China) C Yuan	7^{7}	6
3	(Australia) L Cabrera (Slovakia) N Vargová	6^{4}	3
WC	(Australia) C Korhonen (Australia) S McDonald	2	2
(Australia) G Da Silva-Fick (Australia) A Parnaby	6	6
(Japan) E Hayashi (Japan) K Morisaki	6	6
2	(Hong Kong) E Chong (Hong Kong) C Wong	2	4

Quarterfinals
1	(United Kingdom) N Bains (India) A Raina	7	6^{5}	[8]
(Japan) H Sato (Japan) E Shimizu	5	7^{7}	[10]
4	(Australia) A Osborne (Australia) A Smith	6	2	[10]
(Chinese Taipei) Y-h Lee (Chinese Taipei) F-a Lin	2	6	[6]
(New Zealand) M Barry (Belgium) S Costoulas	7	6
Alt	(Japan) K Yoshioka (China) C Yuan	5	2
(Australia) G Da Silva-Fick (Australia) A Parnaby	4	2
(Japan) E Hayashi (Japan) K Morisaki	6	6

Semifinals
(Japan) H Sato (Japan) E Shimizu	6	7^{8}
4	(Australia) A Osborne (Australia) A Smith	1	6^{6}
(New Zealand) M Barry (Belgium) S Costoulas	4	3
(Japan) E Hayashi (Japan) K Morisaki	6	6

Final
(Japan) H Sato (Japan) E Shimizu	6^{0}	6	[10]
(Japan) E Hayashi (Japan) K Morisaki	7^{7}	3	[6]
