= 2023 Gold Coast Tennis International – Women's singles =

Women's singles
- 2023 Gold Coast Tennis International

Final
- Champion: (Australia) Talia Gibson
- Runner-up: (Australia) Olivia Gadecki
- Score: 7–5, 6–2

Events
| Singles | men | women |
| Doubles | men | women |
| Gold Coast Tennis International | · 2024 → |

This was the first edition of the tournament.

Talia Gibson won the title, defeating Olivia Gadecki in the final, 7–5, 6–2.

== Seeds ==
1. (Australia) Kimberly Birrell (withdrew)
2. (Australia) Olivia Gadecki (final)
3. (Australia) Destanee Aiava (first round, retired)
4. (Japan) Himeno Sakatsume (second round)
5. (India) Ankita Raina (first round)
6. Darya Astakhova (first round, retired)
7. (Australia) Seone Mendez (first round)
8. (Australia) Taylah Preston (withdrew)

== Draw ==
=== Key ===
- Q = Qualifier
- WC = Wild card
- LL = Lucky loser
- Alt = Alternate
- SE = Special exempt
- PR = Protected ranking
- ITF = ITF entry
- JE = Junior exempt
- w/o = Walkover
- r = Retired
- d = Defaulted
- SR = Special ranking

=== Finals ===
Semifinals
(Japan) Eri Shimizu | 1 | 4
(Australia) Talia Gibson | 6 | 6
(Japan) Miho Kuramochi | 1 | 6^{4}
2 | (Australia) Olivia Gadecki | 6 | 7^{7}

Final
(Australia) Talia Gibson | 7 | 6
2 | (Australia) Olivia Gadecki | 5 | 2

=== Top half ===
First round
(Japan) S Hosogi | 5 | 1
WC | (Australia) K McPhee | 7 | 6
Q | (Japan) H Kuwata | 2 | 4
(Australia) P Hule | 6 | 6
Q | (Japan) S Imamura | 3 | 7^{7} | 3
(Japan) E Shimizu | 6 | 6^{5} | 6
Q | (Japan) S Ishii | 6 | 2 | 7^{9}
(Chinese Taipei) J Garland | 3 | 6 | 6^{7}
3 | (Australia) D Aiava | 2 | 0^{r}
(Australia) M Inglis | 6 | 0
(Japan) E Sema | 6 | 6
LL | (Japan) H Sato | 2 | 4
WC | (Australia) T Kokkinis | 3 | 7^{7} | 5
LL | (Australia) E Micic | 6 | 6^{5} | 7
(Australia) T Gibson | 6 | 6
5 | (India) A Raina | 1 | 2

Second round
WC | (Australia) K McPhee | 5 | 1
(Australia) P Hule | 7 | 6
(Japan) E Shimizu | 6 | 2 | 6
Q | (Japan) S Ishii | 4 | 6 | 4
(Australia) M Inglis | 7 | 6
(Japan) E Sema | 5 | 2
LL | (Australia) E Micic | 3 | 6^{3}
(Australia) T Gibson | 6 | 7^{7}

Quarterfinals
(Australia) P Hule | 2 | 2
(Japan) E Shimizu | 6 | 6
(Australia) M Inglis | 5 | 3
(Australia) T Gibson | 7 | 6

Semifinals
(Japan) E Shimizu | 1 | 4
(Australia) T Gibson | 6 | 6

=== Bottom half ===
First round
7 | (Australia) S Mendez | 3 | 3
Q | (South Korea) D-y Back | 6 | 6
WC | (Australia) M Joint | 4 | 3
(Japan) M Kuramochi | 6 | 6
(Czech Republic) M Bayerlová | 1 | 2
Q | (Australia) M Ercan | 6 | 6
LL | (Australia) E Bolton | 0 | 3
4 | (Japan) H Sakatsume | 6 | 6
6 | D Astakhova | 4 | 3^{r}
WC | (Australia) E Jones | 6 | 2
(Japan) H Arakawa | 3 | 2
Q | (Australia) I Popovic | 6 | 6
(Japan) Y Naito | 6 | 1 | 3
Q | (Japan) K Yoshioka | 1 | 6 | 6
Q | (China) F Liu | 6^{7} | 2
2 | (Australia) O Gadecki | 7^{9} | 6

Second round
Q | (South Korea) D-y Back | 5 | 3
(Japan) M Kuramochi | 7 | 6
Q | (Australia) M Ercan | 4 | 6 | 6
4 | (Japan) H Sakatsume | 6 | 2 | 2
WC | (Australia) E Jones | 2 | 6 | 1
Q | (Australia) I Popovic | 6 | 4 | 6
Q | (Japan) K Yoshioka | 2 | 0
2 | (Australia) O Gadecki | 6 | 6

Quarterfinals
(Japan) M Kuramochi | 7^{7} | 6
Q | (Australia) M Ercan | 6^{0} | 1
Q | (Australia) I Popovic | 3 | 3
2 | (Australia) O Gadecki | 6 | 6

Semifinals
(Japan) M Kuramochi | 1 | 6^{4}
2 | (Australia) O Gadecki | 6 | 7^{7}
