= 2024 Gold Coast Tennis International =

Tennis tournament

- Date: 25 November – 1 December 2024
- Edition: 2nd
- Category: ITF Men's World Tennis Tour; ITF Women's World Tennis Tour
- Prize money: $25,000 $60,000
- Surface: Hard / Outdoor
- Location: Gold Coast, Australia

Champions

Men's singles
- (Australia) Matthew Dellavedova

Women's singles
- (Australia) Daria Saville

Men's doubles
- (Australia) Joshua Charlton / (United Kingdom) Emile Hudd

Women's doubles
- (Japan) Hikaru Sato / (Japan) Eri Shimizu
← 2023 ·	Gold Coast Tennis International	· 2025 →

The 2024 Gold Coast Tennis International is a professional tennis tournament played on outdoor hard courts. It is the second edition of the tournament which is part of the 2024 ITF Men's World Tennis Tour and 2024 ITF Women's World Tennis Tour. It took place in Gold Coast, Australia between 25 November and 1 December 2024.

== Champions ==
=== Men's singles ===
- (Australia) Matthew Dellavedova def. (Australia) Jason Kubler 3–6, 6–3, 6–2

=== Women's singles ===
- (Australia) Daria Saville def. (Australia) Lizette Cabrera 7–5, 7–6^{(7–3)}

=== Men's doubles ===
- (Australia) Joshua Charlton / (United Kingdom) Emile Hudd def. (Japan) Issei Okamura / (Japan) Daisuke Sumizawa 7–6^{(7–5)}, 6–3

=== Women's doubles ===
- (Japan) Hikaru Sato / (Japan) Eri Shimizu def. (Japan) Erina Hayashi / (Japan) Kanako Morisaki 6–7^{(0–7)}, 6–3, [10–6]

== Men's singles main draw entrants ==
=== Seeds ===
Country	Player	Rank^{1}	Seed
~~AUS~~	~~Blake Ellis~~	~~354~~	~~1~~
AUS	Matthew Dellavedova	357	2
USA	Christian Langmo	465	3
AUS	Jacob Bradshaw	490	4
GBR	Emile Hudd	524	5
AUS	Blake Mott	529	6
AUS	Jake Delaney	539	7
NZL	Ajeet Rai	572	8

- ^{1} Rankings are as of 18 November 2024.

=== Other entrants ===
The following players received wildcards into the singles main draw:

- (Australia) Jayden Court
- (Australia) Jason Kubler
- (Australia) Pavle Marinkov
- (Australia) Sam Ryan Ziegann

The following players received entry into the singles main draw using a special exempt:

- (Australia) Hayden Jones
- (Australia) Kody Pearson

The following players received entry from the qualifying draw:

- (Australia) Thomas Braithwaite
- (Australia) Joshua Charlton
- (Australia) Chase Ferguson
- (United States) Ryan Fishback
- (Australia) Scott Jones
- (New Zealand) Alexander Klintcharov
- (Japan) Naoki Tajima
- (Japan) Renta Tokuda

The following players received entry as a lucky loser:

- (Japan) Issei Okamura

== Women's singles main draw entrants ==
=== Seeds ===
Country	Player	Rank^{1}	Seed
AUS	Daria Saville	120	1
AUS	Talia Gibson	125	2
AUS	Maddison Inglis	158	3
AUS	Priscilla Hon	190	4
JPN	Kyōka Okamura	243	5
CHN	Lu Jiajing	251	6
BEL	Sofia Costoulas	291	7
JPN	Eri Shimizu	296	8

- ^{1} Rankings are as of 18 November 2024.

=== Other entrants ===
The following player received a wildcard into the singles main draw:

- (Australia) Alicia Smith

The following player received entry into the singles main draw using a special exempt:

- (Australia) Alexandra Bozovic

The following players received entry from the qualifying draw:

- (Japan) Haruna Arakawa
- (Netherlands) Merel Hoedt
- (Japan) Rinko Matsuda
- (Australia) Lily Taylor
- (Japan) Ikumi Yamazaki
- (Chinese Taipei) Yang Ya-yi
- (Japan) Kisa Yoshioka
- (China) Zhang Ying

The following players received entry as a lucky loser:

- (United Kingdom) Naiktha Bains
- (Japan) Nagi Hanatani
- (Chinese Taipei) Lin Fang-an
