= 2023 Gold Coast Tennis International =

Tennis tournament

- Date: 27 November – 3 December 2023
- Edition: 1st
- Category: ITF Men's World Tennis Tour; ITF Women's World Tennis Tour
- Prize money: $25,000 $60,000
- Surface: Hard / Outdoor
- Location: Gold Coast, Australia

Champions

Men's singles
- (Japan) Makoto Ochi

Women's singles
- (Australia) Talia Gibson

Men's doubles
- (Australia) Thomas Fancutt / (New Zealand) Ajeet Rai

Women's doubles
- (Australia) Roisin Gilheany / (Australia) Maya Joint
- Gold Coast Tennis International

The 2023 Gold Coast Tennis International is a professional tennis tournament played on outdoor hard courts. It is the first edition of the tournament which is part of the 2023 ITF Men's World Tennis Tour and 2023 ITF Women's World Tennis Tour. It took place in Gold Coast, Australia between 27 November and 3 December 2023.

== Champions ==
=== Men's singles ===
- (Japan) Makoto Ochi def. (Australia) Matthew Dellavedova, 6–4, 6–3

=== Women's singles ===
- (Australia) Talia Gibson def. (Australia) Olivia Gadecki, 7–5, 6–2

=== Men's doubles ===
- (Australia) Thomas Fancutt / (New Zealand) Ajeet Rai def. (Australia) Blake Bayldon / (Australia) Kody Pearson, 7–5, 7–6^{(12–10)}

=== Women's doubles ===
- (Australia) Roisin Gilheany / (Australia) Maya Joint def. (Australia) Melisa Ercan / (Australia) Alicia Smith, 7–6^{(7–3)}, 6–1

== Men's singles main draw entrants ==
=== Seeds ===
Country	Player	Rank^{1}	Seed
USA	Nick Chappell	390	1
AUS	Blake Mott	398	2
NZL	Ajeet Rai	458	3
AUS	Thomas Fancutt	496	4
AUS	Jake Delaney	498	5
VIE	Lý Hoàng Nam	538	6
JPN	Makoto Ochi	571	7
AUS	Matthew Dellavedova	600	8

- ^{1} Rankings are as of 20 November 2023.

=== Other entrants ===
The following players received wildcards into the singles main draw:

- (Australia) Joshua Charlton
- (Australia) Matt Hulme
- (Australia) Scott Jones
- (Australia) Zachary Viiala

The following players received entry into the singles main draw using a protected ranking:

- (Japan) Jumpei Yamasaki

The following players received entry from the qualifying draw:

- (Australia) Jesse Delaney
- (Australia) Mason Naumovski
- (Australia) Tomislav Edward Papac
- (Australia) Tai Sach
- (Australia) Luke Sorensen
- (Canada) Andre Szilvassy
- (Japan) Naoki Tajima
- (Australia) Zaharije-Zak Talic

== Women's singles main draw entrants ==
=== Seeds ===
Country	Player	Rank^{1}	Seed
~~AUS~~	~~Kimberly Birrell~~	~~110~~	~~1~~
AUS	Olivia Gadecki	132	2
AUS	Destanee Aiava	186	3
JPN	Himeno Sakatsume	187	4
IND	Ankita Raina	201	5
	Darya Astakhova	213	6
AUS	Seone Mendez	241	7
~~AUS~~	~~Taylah Preston~~	~~247~~	~~8~~

- ^{1} Rankings are as of 20 November 2023.

=== Other entrants ===
The following players received wildcards into the singles main draw:

- (Australia) Maya Joint
- (Australia) Emerson Jones
- (Australia) Tahlia Kokkinis
- (Australia) Kaylah McPhee

The following players received entry from the qualifying draw:

- (South Korea) Back Da-yeon
- (Australia) Melisa Ercan
- (Japan) Saki Imamura
- (Japan) Sayaka Ishii
- (Japan) Hiroko Kuwata
- (China) Liu Fangzhou
- (Australia) Ivana Popovic
- (Japan) Kisa Yoshioka

The following players received entry as lucky losers:

- (Australia) Elysia Bolton
- (Australia) Elena Micic
- (Japan) Hikaru Sato
