= 2026 Takasaki Open – Doubles =

Doubles
- 2026 Takasaki Open

Final
- Champion: (Japan) Ayano Shimizu (Japan) Eri Shimizu
- Runner-up: (Chinese Taipei) Lee Ya-hsin (Hong Kong) Cody Wong
- Score: 6–1, 6–4

Events
Singles	Doubles
- Takasaki Open

Ayano and Eri Shimizu won the title, defeating Lee Ya-hsin and Cody Wong 6–1, 6–4 in the final.

Momoko Kobori and Ayano Shimizu were the two time defending champions, but chose to play with different partners. Kobori partnered Sara Saito, but lost in the first round to Dalayna Hewitt and Raluca Șerban.

== Seeds ==
1. (Japan) Ayano Shimizu / (Japan) Eri Shimizu (champions)
2. (Australia) Alexandra Osborne / (China) Zheng Wushuang (quarterfinals)
3. (Japan) Momoko Kobori / (Japan) Sara Saito (first round)
4. (Japan) Kanako Morisaki / (South Korea) Park So-hyun (first round)

== Draw ==
Key

- Q = Qualifier
- WC = Wild card
- LL = Lucky loser
- Alt = Alternate
- ITF = ITF entry
- PR = Protected ranking
- SR = Special ranking
- SE = Special exempt
- JE = Junior exempt
- JR = Junior Accelerator Programme entrant
- CO = College Accelerator Programme entrant
- NG = Next Gen Accelerator Program entrant
- w/o = Walkover
- r = Retired
- d = Defaulted

=== Draw ===
First round
1	(Japan) A Shimizu (Japan) E Shimizu	6^{6}	6	[11]
WC	(Japan) K Hayasaka (Japan) K Sawashiro	7^{8}	2	[9]
WC	(Japan) Y Hosoki (Japan) A Ozeki	1	1
Alt	(Japan) H Sato (Japan) K Yoshioka	6	6
3	(Japan) M Kobori (Japan) S Saito	1	4
(United States) D Hewitt (Cyprus) R Șerban	6	6
(Japan) N Kawaguchi (Japan) H Kuwata	1	4
(Japan) M Matsuda (Japan) I Yamazaki	6	6
(Chinese Taipei) Y-hsi Lee (Hong Kong) C Wong	7	6
(Japan) H Kinoshita (Thailand) M Sawangkaew	5	4
(Australia) G Da Silva-Fick (Australia) T McGiffin	6	7^{7}
4	(Japan) K Morisaki (South Korea) S-h Park	0	6^{2}
S Lansere (Australia) E Micic	2	6	[8]
(China) Y Ren (Japan) E Sema	6	0	[10]
(China) H Shi (China) Q Ye	2	4
2	(Australia) A Osborne (China) W Zheng	6	6

Quarterfinals
1	(Japan) A Shimizu (Japan) E Shimizu	6	7^{7}
Alt	(Japan) H Sato (Japan) K Yoshioka	4	6^{5}
(United States) D Hewitt (Cyprus) R Șerban	6	7
(Japan) M Matsuda (Japan) I Yamazaki	3	5
(Chinese Taipei) Y-hsi Lee (Hong Kong) C Wong	6	7
(Australia) G Da Silva-Fick (Australia) T McGiffin	1	5
(China) Y Ren (Japan) E Sema	6	6
2	(Australia) A Osborne (China) W Zheng	0	3

Semifinals
1	(Japan) A Shimizu (Japan) E Shimizu	6	6
(United States) D Hewitt (Cyprus) R Șerban	4	4
(Chinese Taipei) Y-hsi Lee (Hong Kong) C Wong	6	5	[10]
(China) Y Ren (Japan) E Sema	1	7	[6]

Final
1	(Japan) A Shimizu (Japan) E Shimizu	6	6
(Chinese Taipei) Y-hsi Lee (Hong Kong) C Wong	1	4
