= 2026 Takasaki Open – Singles =

Singles
- 2026 Takasaki Open

Final
- Champion: (Japan) Yuki Naito
- Runner-up: (Switzerland) Valentina Ryser
- Score: 6–4, 6–3

Events
Singles	Doubles
- Takasaki Open

Himeno Sakatsume was the defending champion, but chose to compete at the 2026 French Open qualifying instead.

Yuki Naito won the title, defeating Valentina Ryser 6–4, 6–3 in the final.

== Seeds ==
1. (Thailand) Mananchaya Sawangkaew (first round)
2. (Japan) Hayu Kinoshita (quarterfinals)
3. (China) Tian Fangran (second round)
4. (United States) Hina Inoue (first round)
5. Sofya Lansere (first round)
6. (Cyprus) Raluca Șerban (quarterfinals)
7. (Japan) Kyōka Okamura (first round)
8. (South Korea) Park So-hyun (second round, retired)

== Draw ==
Key

- Q = Qualifier
- WC = Wild card
- LL = Lucky loser
- Alt = Alternate
- ITF = ITF entry
- PR = Protected ranking
- SR = Special ranking
- SE = Special exempt
- JE = Junior exempt
- JR = Junior Accelerator Programme entrant
- CO = College Accelerator Programme entrant
- NG = Next Gen Accelerator Program entrant
- w/o = Walkover
- r = Retired
- d = Defaulted

=== Finals ===
Semifinals
Q	(Japan) Momoko Kobori	7^{7}	4	4
Q	(Japan) Yuki Naito	6^{5}	6	6
(Japan) Haruka Kaji	3	3
Q	(Switzerland) Valentina Ryser	6	6

Final
Q	(Japan) Yuki Naito	6	6
Q	(Switzerland) Valentina Ryser	4	3

=== Top half ===
First round
1	(Thailand) M Sawangkaew	3	6	3
Q	(Japan) Hik Sato	6	3	6
WC	(Japan) K Sawashiro	0	3
WC	(Japan) A Shimizu	6	6
LL	(Japan) I Yamazaki	0	6^{6}
Q	(Japan) M Kobori	6	7^{8}
(Japan) M Yamaguchi	6	6
5	S Lansere	3	2
4	(United States) H Inoue	7^{10}	5	4
Q	(Japan) Y Naito	6^{8}	7	6
(China) H Shi	6	1	2
Q	(Japan) E Shimizu	4	6	6
WC	(Japan) E Koike	6	3	7
LL	(Japan) E Sema	3	6	5
SR	(United Kingdom) K Dunne	0	2
6	(Cyprus) R Șerban	6	6

Second round
Q	(Japan) Hik Sato	6	6
WC	(Japan) A Shimizu	3	4
Q	(Japan) M Kobori	6	6
(Japan) M Yamaguchi	4	3
Q	(Japan) Y Naito	7	6
Q	(Japan) E Shimizu	5	4
WC	(Japan) E Koike	6	5	4
6	(Cyprus) R Șerban	4	7	6

Quarterfinals
Q	(Japan) Hik Sato	3	4
Q	(Japan) M Kobori	6	6
Q	(Japan) Y Naito	6	6
6	(Cyprus) R Șerban	3	4

Semifinals
Q	(Japan) M Kobori	7^{7}	4	4
Q	(Japan) Y Naito	6^{5}	6	6

=== Bottom half ===
First round
8	(South Korea) S-h Park	7	0	6
(Australia) L Cabrera	5	6	1
(China) Y Ren	2	4
(Japan) R Saigo	6	6
(Japan) H Kaji	6	7^{7}
Q	(Japan) M Matsuda	2	6^{1}
(Australia) E Micic	3	4
3	(China) F Tian	6	6
7	(Japan) K Okamura	6	4	3
Q	(Switzerland) V Ryser	4	6	6
Q	(Japan) N Kawaguchi	6	7^{7}
WC	(Japan) S Ishii	3	6^{2}
(United Kingdom) L Miyazaki	7^{7}	4	2
(Japan) S Saito	6^{3}	6	6
Q	(Japan) Mi Mushika	3^{r}
2	(Japan) H Kinoshita	5

Second round
8	(South Korea) S-h Park	6	0^{r}
(Japan) R Saigo	2	5
(Japan) H Kaji	6	6
3	(China) F Tian	0	4
Q	(Switzerland) V Ryser	7	6
Q	(Japan) N Kawaguchi	5	2
(Japan) S Saito	1	3
2	(Japan) H Kinoshita	6	6

Quarterfinals
(Japan) R Saigo	0	4
(Japan) H Kaji	6	6
Q	(Switzerland) V Ryser	6	6
2	(Japan) H Kinoshita	4	4

Semifinals
(Japan) H Kaji	3	3
Q	(Switzerland) V Ryser	6	6
