= Himari Satō =

Japanese tennis player (born 2002)

Himari Satō 佐藤 久真莉
- Country (sports): Japan
- Born: 10 April 2002 (age 24) Saitama, Japan
- Height: 1.68 m (5 ft 6 in)
- Turned pro: April 2019
- Plays: Right (two-handed backhand)
- Prize money: $39,811

Singles
- Career record: 135–151
- Highest ranking: No. 685 (12 June 2023)
- Current ranking: No. 1132 (27 July 2026)

Doubles
- Career record: 74–80
- Career titles: 2 ITF
- Highest ranking: No. 524 (13 June 2022)
- Current ranking: No. 589 (27 July 2026)
- Last updated on: 1 August 2026.

Himari Satō (佐藤 久真莉, Satō Himari; born 10 April 2002) is a Japanese tennis player.

She has a career-high doubles ranking of 685 by the WTA, achieved on 12 June 2023.

Satō has represented Japan at the Billie Jean King Cup, where she made her debut at the 2021 play-offs against Ukraine.

== ITF Circuit finals ==
=== Singles: 1 (runner-up) ===
Legend W15 tournaments	Finals by surface Hard (0–1)

Result	Date	Tournament	Tier	Surface	Opponent	Score
Loss	Jul 2019	ITF Hua Hin, Thailand	W15	Hard	(France) Lou Brouleau	4–6, 3–6

=== Doubles: 8 (2 titles, 6 runner-ups) ===
Legend W25/35 tournaments W15 tournaments	Finals by surface Hard (2–4) Clay (0–2)

Result	W–L	Date	Tournament	Tier	Surface	Partner	Opponents	Score
Loss	0–1	Aug 2019	ITF Olomouc, Czech Republic	W15	Clay	(Slovenia) Pia Lovrič	(Czech Republic) Klára Hájková (Czech Republic) Aneta Laboutková	4–6, 6–2, [4–10]
Loss	0–2	Jun 2021	ITF Palma del Río, Spain	W25	Clay	(Switzerland) Lulu Sun	(Japan) Eri Hozumi (Russia) Valeria Savinykh	6–7^{(6)}, 3–6
Loss	0–3	Sep 2021	ITF Monastir, Tunisia	W15	Hard	(France) Yasmine Mansouri	(China) Ma Yexin (Russia) Ekaterina Reyngold	2–6, 2–6
Win	1–3	Jul 2023	ITF Sapporo, Japan	W15	Hard	(Japan) Mao Mushika	(South Korea) Back Da-yeon (South Korea) Jeong Bo-young	6–3, 6–4
Loss	1–4	Apr 2026	ITF Osaka, Japan	W35	Hard	(Japan) Ayumi Miyamoto	(Japan) Misaki Matsuda (Japan) Ikumi Yamazaki	5–7, 2–6
Win	2–4	May 2026	ITF Toyama, Japan	W15	Hard	(Japan) Ayumi Miyamoto	(South Korea) Moon Jeong (Hong Kong) Shek Cheuk-ying	6–4, 6–2
Loss	2–5	Jun 2026	ITF Tokyo, Japan	W15	Hard	(Japan) Anri Nagata	(South Korea) Im Hee-rae (South Korea) Kim Eun-chae	2–6, 3–6
Loss	2–6	Jul 2026	ITF Brisbane, Australia	W15	Hard	(Japan) Mana Kawamura	(Australia) Lily Fairclough (Australia) Roisin Gilheany	2–6, 2–6
