= Gold Coast Tennis International =

Tennis tournament in Australia

- 2024 Gold Coast Tennis International

Tournament information
- Event name: Gold Coast Tennis International
- Founded: 2023
- Location: Gold Coast, Australia
- Venue: KDV Sport
- Surface: Hard / Outdoor
- Website: Website
ATP Tour
- Category: ITF Men's Circuit
- Draw: 48S/32Q/16D
- Prize money: $25,000
WTA Tour
- Category: ITF Women's Circuit
- Draw: 32S/32Q/16D
- Prize money: $60,000

The Gold Coast Tennis International is a tournament for professional male and female tennis players played on outdoor hardcourts. It is currently part of the International Tennis Federation (ITF) Women's Circuit and Men's Circuit. The event is classified as a $60,000 ITF Women's World Tennis Tour and a $25,000 ITF Men's World Tennis Tour tournament and has been held in Gold Coast, Australia, since 2023. The women's tournament held regularly in late November.

== Past finals ==
=== Men's singles ===
| Year | Champion | Runner-up | Score |
|---|---|---|---|
| 2024 | (Australia) Matthew Dellavedova | (Australia) Jason Kubler | 3–6, 6–3, 6–2 |
| 2023 | (Japan) Makoto Ochi | (Australia) Matthew Dellavedova | 6–4, 6–3 |

=== Women's singles ===
| Year | Champion | Runner-up | Score |
|---|---|---|---|
| 2024 | (Australia) Daria Saville | (Australia) Lizette Cabrera | 7–5, 7–6^{(7–3)} |
| 2023 | (Australia) Talia Gibson | (Australia) Olivia Gadecki | 7–5, 6–2 |

=== Men's doubles ===
| Year | Champions | Runners-up | Score |
|---|---|---|---|
| 2024 | (Australia) Joshua Charlton (United Kingdom) Emile Hudd | (Japan) Issei Okamura (Japan) Daisuke Sumizawa | 7–6^{(7–5)}, 6–3 |
| 2023 | (Australia) Thomas Fancutt (New Zealand) Ajeet Rai | (Australia) Blake Bayldon (Australia) Kody Pearson | 7–5, 7–6^{(12–10)} |

=== Women's doubles ===
| Year | Champions | Runners-up | Score |
|---|---|---|---|
| 2024 | (Japan) Hikaru Sato (Japan) Eri Shimizu | (Japan) Erina Hayashi (Japan) Kanako Morisaki | 6–7^{(0–7)}, 6–3, [10–6] |
| 2023 | (Australia) Roisin Gilheany (Australia) Maya Joint | (Australia) Melisa Ercan (Australia) Alicia Smith | 7–6^{(7–3)}, 6–1 |
