= Aglaya Fedorova =

Russian tennis player (born 2004)

- Full name: Aglaya Arturovna Fedorova
- Country (sports): Russia
- Born: 5 February 2004 (age 22) Sevastopol, Ukraine
- Plays: Right-handed
- Prize money: $23,337

Singles
- Career record: 45–46
- Highest ranking: No. 859 (19 August 2024)
- Current ranking: No. 940 (17 June 2024)

Doubles
- Career record: 51–27
- Career titles: 6 ITF
- Highest ranking: No. 423 (10 February 2025)
- Current ranking: No. 539 (17 June 2024)
- Last updated on: 19 June 2024.

Aglaya Arturovna Fedorova (Russian: Аглая Артуровна Федорова, born 5 February 2004) is a Russian tennis player.

Fedorova has a career-high singles ranking by the WTA of 908, achieved on 6 May 2024. She also has a career-high WTA doubles ranking of 516, achieved on 25 September 2023.

Partnering Kira Pavlova, Fedorova won her first $50k tournament in June 2014 at La Marsa in Tunisia.

== ITF Circuit finals ==
=== Singles: 1 (runner-up) ===
Legend W35 tournaments $15,000 tournaments (0–1)	Finals by surface Hard (0–1)

Result	W–L	Date	Tournament	Tier	Surface	Opponent	Score
Loss	0–1	Aug 2023	ITF Ust-Kamenogorsk, Kazakhstan	W15	Hard	(Russia) Kristiana Sidorova	4–6, 2–6

=== Doubles: 15 (6 titles, 9 runner-ups) ===
Legend
W50 tournaments
W25 tournaments
W15 tournaments

Result	W–L	Date	Location	Tier	Surface	Partner	Opponents	Score
Win	1–0	Sep 2022	Sharm El Sheikh, Egypt	W15	Hard	(Russia) Elena Pridankina	(Egypt) Yasmin Ezzat (Belarus) Aliona Falei	7–5, 6–1
Loss	1–1	Oct 2022	Sharm El Sheikh, Egypt	W15	Hard	(Russia) Elena Pridankina	(Italy) Anastasia Abbagnato (Italy) Beatrice Stagno	6–2, 3–6, [5–10]
Loss	1–2	Nov 2022	Sharm El Sheikh, Egypt	W15	Hard	(Belarus) Aliona Falei	(Chinese Taipei) Cho I-hsuan (Chinese Taipei) Cho Yi-tsen	3–6, 6–3, [5–10]
Loss	1–3	Dec 2022	Sharm El Sheikh, Egypt	W15	Hard	(Russia) Elizaveta Masnaia	(Chinese Taipei) Cho I-hsuan (Chinese Taipei) Cho Yi-tsen	w/o
Loss	1–4	Mar 2023	Sharm El Sheikh, Egypt	W15	Hard	(Slovakia) Katarína Kužmová	(Japan) Mei Hasegawa (Hong Kong) Wu Ho-ching	w/o
Loss	1–5	Apr 2023	Sharm El SheikH, Egypt	W25	Hard	(Belarus) Darya Shauha	(China) Gao Xinyu (China) Wang Meiling	3–6, 2–6
Loss	1–6	May 2023	Kachreti, Georgia	W25	Hard	(Belarus) Darya Shauha	(Canada) Stacey Fung (Russia) Maria Kozyreva	5–7, 5–7
Loss	1–7	Jul 2023	Monastir, Tunisia	W15	Hard	(Australia) Lisa Mays	(Spain) Lucia Llinares Domingo (France) Lola Marandel	4–6, 6–7^{(5)}
Loss	1–8	Jul 2023	Monastir, Tunisia	W15	Hard	(Russia) Elizaveta Shebekina	(Slovakia) Salma Drugdová (Slovakia) Katarína Kužmová	w/o
Loss	1–9	Aug 2023	Ust-Kamenogorsk, Kazakhstan	W15	Hard	(Russia) Elizaveta Shebekina	(Kazakhstan) Asylzhan Arystanbekova (Kazakhstan) Sandugash Kenzhibayeva	4–6, 3–6
Win	2–9	Aug 2023	Ust-Kamenogorsk, Kazakhstan	W15	Hard	(Russia) Kristiana Sidorova	(Kyrgyzstan) Vladislava Andreevskaya (Kazakhstan) Dana Baidaulet	7–6^{(4)}, 7–6^{(5)}
Win	3–9	Jun 2024	La Marsa, Tunisia	W50	Hard	(Russia) Kira Pavlova	(Slovakia) Katarína Kužmová (France) Yasmine Mansouri	6–7^{(3)}, 6–1, 10–3
Win	4–9	Jul 2024	Monastir, Tunisia	W15	Hard	(Egypt) Lamis Alhussein Abdel Aziz	(Romania) Alexandra Iordache (Estonia) Liisa Varul	6–3, 3–6, [10–5]
Win	5–9	Aug 2024	Ust-Kamenogorsk, Kazakhstan	W15	Hard	(Belarus) Daria Khomutsianskaya	(South Korea) Back Da-yeon (Japan) Ayumi Koshiishi	7–6^{(4)}, 6–2
Win	6–9	Nov 2024	Sharm El Sheikh, Egypt	W15	Hard	(Russia) Alisa Kummel	(Netherlands) Joy De Zeeuw (Kazakhstan) Sandugash Kenzhibayeva	6–4, 6–3
