= Monique Barry =

New Zealand tennis player (born 2002)

- Country (sports): New Zealand
- Residence: Melbourne, Australia
- Born: 21 June 2002 (age 24) New Plymouth, New Zealand
- Prize money: $72,862

Singles
- Career record: 122–128
- Career titles: 0
- Highest ranking: No. 471 (17 March 2025)
- Current ranking: No. 742 (27 July 2026)

Doubles
- Career record: 129–111
- Career titles: 13 ITF
- Highest ranking: No. 241 (24 November 2025)
- Current ranking: No. 270 (27 July 2026)
- Last updated on: 31 July 2026.

Monique Barry (born 21 June 2002) is a tennis player from New Zealand. She has a career-high singles ranking of world No. 471, which she reached on 17 March 2025, and a career-high doubles ranking of 241, achieved on 24 November 2025.

== Early life ==
Born in New Plymouth, Barry moved to Queensland with her family at the age of four years-old, before basing herself in Melbourne.

== Career ==
In 2019, Barry won the singles title at the Warrnambool grass-court tournament.

Barry was named the New Zealand Player of the Year in 2022 and 2023. She won her first doubles title on the ITF Women's World Tennis Tour in July 2022 in Caloundra, Australia with fellow Kiwi Vivian Yang. In July 2023, she won her second title, playing doubles with Indian player Shrivalli Bhamidipaty in Nakhon Si Thammarat, Thailand with a straight-sets win over home pairing Punnin Kovapitukted and Supapitch Kuearum. That month, she represented New Zealand in the 2023 Billie Jean King Cup, playing doubles alongside Vivian Yang in a 3-0 win over Malaysia.

In December 2023, she won the Wildcard Play-off match at the ASB Tennis Arena in Auckland to earn a debut on the WTA Tour at the 2024 Auckland Open, where she lost to Elina Avanesyan in the first round. Ranked at world No. 726, Barry was given a wildcard entry into the main draw of the 2026 Auckland Open, but again she lost in the first round, this time to Ella Seidel.

== ITF Circuit finals ==
=== Doubles: 22 (14 titles, 8 runner-ups) ===
Legend W50 tournaments W25/35 tournaments (8–5) W15 tournaments (6–3)	Finals by surface Hard (13–5) Clay (1–1) Grass (0–2)

Result	W–L	Date	Tournament	Tier	Surface	Partner	Opponents	Score
Win	1–0	Jul 2022	ITF Caloundra, Australia	W15	Hard	(New Zealand) Vivian Yang	(Japan) Aoi Ito (Japan) Nanari Katsumi	6–2, 7–6^{(5)}
Loss	1–1	Jul 2022	ITF Caloundra, Australia	W15	Hard	(Australia) Stefani Webb	(Japan) Aoi Ito (Japan) Nanari Katsumi	2–6, 2–6
Loss	1–2	Jun 2023	ITF Tainan, Taiwan	W25	Clay	(Chinese Taipei) Lee Ya-hsin	(Chinese Taipei) Tsao Chia-yi (Chinese Taipei) Yang Ya-yi	2–6, 2–6
Win	2–2	Jul 2023	ITF Nakhon Si Thammarat, Thailand	W15	Hard	(India) Shrivalli Bhamidipaty	(Thailand) Punnin Kovapitukted (Thailand) Supapitch Kuearum	6–3, 7–6^{(3)}
Win	3–2	Jul 2023	ITF Caloundra, Australia	W15	Hard	(Australia) Lily Fairclough	(Japan) Yui Chikaraishi (Australia) Elyse Tse	6–4, 6–1
Loss	3–3	Mar 2024	ITF Swan Hill, Australia	W35	Grass	(Australia) Alana Parnaby	(Japan) Sakura Hosogi (Japan) Misaki Matsuda	2–6, 2–6
Loss	3–4	Jul 2024	ITF Nakhon Si Thammarat, Thailand	W15	Hard	(Australia) Alicia Smith	(Thailand) Patcharin Cheapchandej (Thailand) Punnin Kovapitukted	3–6, 1–6
Win	4–4	Jul 2024	ITF Nakhon Si Thammarat, Thailand	W15	Hard	(Australia) Alicia Smith	(South Korea) Jeong Bo-young (Thailand) Punnin Kovapitukted	6–4, 6–3
Win	5–4	Dec 2024	ITF Wellington, New Zealand	W15	Hard	(Netherlands) Merel Hoedt	(Japan) Shiho Akita (Japan) Nanari Katsumi	6–3, 6–3
Win	6–4	Feb 2025	Burnie International, Australia	W35	Hard	(Australia) Elena Micic	(Australia) Gabriella Da Silva-Fick (Australia) Belle Thompson	6–3, 6–4
Win	7–4	Feb 2025	Launceston International, Australia	W35	Hard	(Australia) Elena Micic	(Japan) Miho Kuramochi (Japan) Erika Sema	6–2, 6–4
Loss	7–5	Mar 2025	ITF Swan Hill, Australia	W35	Grass	(Australia) Elena Micic	(Japan) Ayumi Miyamoto (Australia) Stefani Webb	3–6, 6–4, [4–10]
Loss	7–6	Aug 2025	ITF Tweed Heads, Australia	W15	Hard	(Australia) Gabriella Da Silva-Fick	(Australia) Catherine Aulia (Australia) Lily Fairclough	6–2, 4–6, [9–11]
Win	8–6	Aug 2025	ITF Tweed Heads, Australia	W15	Hard	(Australia) Gabriella Da Silva-Fick	(Australia) Alana Subasic (Australia) Belle Thompson	6–4, 6–1
Win	9–6	Sep 2025	ITF Darwin, Australia	W35	Hard	(Australia) Gabriella Da Silva-Fick	(United Kingdom) Brooke Black (Japan) Reina Goto	6–3, 7–6^{(7)}
Win	10–6	Oct 2025	Brisbane QTC International, Australia	W35	Hard	(Japan) Natsumi Kawaguchi	(Australia) Tenika McGiffin (Japan) Naho Sato	7–5, 6–3
Loss	10–7	Feb 2026	Burnie International, Australia	W35	Hard	(Australia) Alexandra Osborne	(Australia) Gabriella Da Silva-Fick (Australia) Tenika McGiffin	4–6, 3–6
Win	11–7	Mar 2026	ITF Timaru, New Zealand	W35	Hard	(Australia) Alexandra Osborne	(Australia) Amy Stevens (Australia) Belle Thompson	6–2, 6–2
Loss	11–8	May 2026	ITF Wuning, China	W35	Hard	(China) Yuan Chengyiyi	(China) Huang Yujia (China) Zhang Ying	6–3, 2–6, [7–10]
Win	12–8	May 2026	ITF Wuning, China	W35	Hard	(Japan) Hikaru Sato	(China) Wang Meiling (China) Ye Qiuyu	7–6^{(3)}, 6–4
Win	13–8	Aug 2026	ITF Erwitte, Germany	W35	Clay	(South Korea) Park So-hyun	(Netherlands) Madelief Hageman (Netherlands) Klara Veldman	6–7^{(0)}, 6–3, [10–7]
Win	14–8	Oct 2026	ITF Sydney, Australia	W35	Hard	(Japan) Hikaru Sato	(Australia) Amy Stevens (Australia) Belle Thompson	6–3, 5–7, [10–8]
