= Haruna Arakawa =

Japanese tennis player (born 1999)

- Country (sports): Japan
- Plays: Right (two-handed backhand)
- Prize money: $144,345

Singles
- Career record: 254–236
- Career titles: 4 ITF
- Highest ranking: No. 352 (10 February 2020)
- Current ranking: No. 835 (14 October 2026)

Doubles
- Career record: 196–162
- Career titles: 13 ITF
- Highest ranking: No. 240 (22 May 2023)
- Current ranking: No. 744 (14 October 2026)
- Last updated on: 14 October 2026.

Haruna Arakawa (荒川 晴菜, Arakawa Haruna; born 27 October 1999 in Edogawa, Tokyo) is a Japanese tennis player. Her career-high singles ranking by the WTA is 352, which she achieved on 10 February 2020. Her career-high doubles ranking is 240, achieved on 22 May 2023.

== Career ==
Haruna Arakawa began playing tennis at age 5, and she turned professional in April 2017. According to her ITF profile, she prefers playing on hardcourt. She primarily competes on the ITF Women's World Tennis Tour, where she has won four singles and 13 doubles titles.

== Tournaments won ==
=== Singles ===
Date	Tournament	Tier	Surface	Opponent	Score
Feb 2022	Monastir, Tunisia	W15	Hard	(Japan) Ayumi Morita	walkover
May 2022	Acre, Israel	W25	Hard	(Romania) Elena-Teodora Cadar	6:4, 6:2
Jun 2023	Nakhon Si Thammarat, Thailand	W25	Hard	(United States) Dasha Ivanova	6:4, 6:4
Aug 2025	Singapore	W15	Hard	(South Korea) Cherry Kim	6:4, 6:0

=== Doubles ===
Date	Tournament	Tier	Surface	Partner	Opponents	Score
Apr 2018	Antalya, Turkiye	W15	Clay	(Italy) Federica Bilardo	(Russia) Kamilla Rakhimova (Czech Republic) Kateřina Vaňková	4:6, 6:4, [10:8]
May 2018	Antalya, Turkiye	W15	Clay	(Belarus) Ilona Kremen	(China) Youmi Zhuoma (China) Zhuoma Ni Ma	walkover
May 2018	Antalya, Turkiye	W15	Clay	(Belarus) Ilona Kremen	(Romania) Alexandra Diana Braga (Romania) Oana Georgeta Simion	6:1, 6:0
May 2018	Antalya, Turkiye	W15	Clay	(Czech Republic) Magdaléna Pantůčková	(Netherlands) Suzan Lamens (Romania) Arina Gabriela Vasilescu	7:5, 7:6^{3}
Mar 2019	Nishitama, Japan	W25	Hard	(Japan) Minori Yonehara	(United States) Emina Bektas (United Kingdom) Tara Moore	6:4, 6:3
Feb 2022	Monastir, Tunisia	W15	Hard	(Netherlands) Jasmijn Gimbrère	(France) Kelia Le Bihan (France) Nina Radovanovic	6:4, 6:0
May 2022	Netanya, Israel	W25	Hard	(Japan) Natsuho Arakawa	(United Kingdom) Emilie Lindh Gallagher (Israel) Nicole Nadel	6:2, 6:4
Oct 2022	Hamamatsu, Japan	W25	Hard	(Japan) Aoi Ito	(Japan) Erina Hayashi (Japan) Kanako Morisaki	6:1, 7:6^{6}
Aug 2023	Astana, Kazakhstan	W25	Hard	(Japan) Erika Sema	(India) Shrivalli Bhamidipaty (India) Vaidehi Chaudhari	6:7^{6}, 6:3, [10:5]
Apr 2025	Charlotte, US	W35	Clay	(Bosnia and Herzegovina) Ema Burgić	(Mexico) María Portillo Ramírez (Mexico) Victoria Rodríguez	6:2, 7:5
Aug 2025	Singapore	W15	Hard	(Japan) Natsumi Kawaguchi	(Japan) Natsuho Arakawa (Japan) Anri Nagata	6:2, 6:2
Sep 2025	Wagga Wagga, Australia	W35	Hard	(Japan) Ayumi Miyamoto	(Australia) Elena Micic (Australia) Belle Thompson	6:2, 4:6, [10:4]
Oct 2026	Wagga Wagga, Australia	W35	Hard	(Japan) Sera Nishimoto	(Australia) Amy Stevens (Australia) Belle Thompson	6–4, 6–2
