= Back Da-yeon =

South Korean tennis player (born 2002)

- Country (sports): South Korea
- Born: 24 January 2002 (age 24) Daejeon, South Korea
- Height: 173 cm (5 ft 8 in)
- Turned pro: 2017
- Plays: Right-handed
- Prize money: $147,340

Singles
- Career record: 235–102
- Career titles: 12 ITF
- Highest ranking: No. 245 (27 July 2026)
- Current ranking: No. 261 (28 September 2026)

Doubles
- Career record: 135–83
- Career titles: 16 ITF
- Highest ranking: No. 197 (9 November 2026)
- Current ranking: No. 197 (9 November 2026)
Medal record
Women's tennis
Representing South Korea
Asian Games
Bronze medal – third place	2022 Hangzhou	Doubles
- Last updated on: 28 July 2026.

Back Da-yeon (born 24 January 2002) is a Korean tennis player. She has a career-high singles ranking of 245 by the WTA, achieved on 27 July 2026, and a best doubles ranking of No. 197, reached on 9 November 2026. She has won twelve singles titles and 15 doubles titles on the ITF Circuit.

== Career ==
Back made her WTA Tour debut at the 2022 Korea Open, after qualifying for the singles main draw. She lost in the first round to fellow South Korean player Han Na-lae.

She was a winner of the Heart Award in the 2023 Billie Jean King Cup.

Ranked No. 569, she received a wildcard from the 2023 Korea Open and upset second seed Jelena Ostapenko in the champion's tie-break having fought back from match point down earlier in the third set. before losing in the next round to Kimberly Birrell.

Given a wildcard for the newly upgraded WTA 500 Korea Open in 2024, she tried to defend her success of the previous year, but went out in the first round, in straight sets to qualifier Carol Zhao.

== ITF Circuit finals ==
=== Singles: 21 (12 titles, 9 runner-ups) ===
Legend W50 tournaments (0–1) W35 tournaments (5–2) W15 tournaments (7–6)	Finals by surface Hard (12–7) Clay (0–1) Carpet (0–1)

Result	W–L	Date	Tournament	Tier	Surface	Opponent	Score
Loss	0–1	Sep 2019	ITF Yeongwol, South Korea	W15	Hard	(South Korea) Choi Ji-hee	7–5, 3–6, 2–6
Win	1–1	Sep 2022	ITF Yeongwol, South Korea	W15	Hard	(South Korea) Kim Da-bin	7–6^{(2)}, 3–0 ret.
Loss	1–2	Jul 2023	ITF Nakhon, Thailand	W15	Hard	(Thailand) Lanlana Tararudee	4–6, 4–6
Win	2–2	Aug 2023	ITF Sapporo, Japan	W15	Hard	(Japan) Miho Kuramochi	6–2, 6–0
Win	3–2	Sep 2023	ITF Yeongwol, South Korea	W15	Hard	(United States) Dasha Ivanova	6–3, 6–0
Loss	3–3	Sep 2023	ITF Yeongwol, South Korea	W15	Hard	(South Korea) Kim Da-bin	2–6, 1–6
Loss	3–4	May 2024	ITF Monastir, Tunisia	W15	Hard	Mariia Tkacheva	4–6, 3–6
Win	4–4	May 2024	ITF Monastir, Tunisia	W15	Hard	(Slovakia) Katarína Kužmová	6–3, 6–0
Win	5–4	Jun 2024	ITF Daegu, South Korea	W35	Hard	(Japan) Eri Shimizu	4–6, 6–2, 6–3
Win	6–4	Sep 2024	ITF Yeongwol, South Korea	W15	Hard	(South Korea) Lee Eun-hye	6–2, 6–1
Win	7–4	Sep 2024	ITF Yeongwol, South Korea	W15	Hard	(South Korea) Jeong Bo-young	6–1, 6–2
Loss	7–5	Mar 2025	ITF Nonthaburi, Thailand	W35	Hard	(South Korea) Lee Eun-hye	3–6, 4–6
Loss	7–6	Mar 2025	ITF Nonthaburi, Thailand	W15	Hard	(Thailand) Anchisa Chanta	6–7(^{(3)}, 3–6
Win	8–6	May 2025	ITF Daegu, South Korea	W15	Hard	(South Korea) Lee Eun-hye	5–6 ret.
Win	9–6	Jul 2025	ITF Monastir, Tunisia	W35	Hard	(Italy) Arianna Zucchini	6–7^{(4)}, 6–2, 7–6^{(7)}
Loss	9–7	Oct 2025	ITF Makinohara, Japan	W35	Carpet	(Japan) Sara Saito	1–6, 2–6
Loss	9–8	Apr 2026	ITF Singapore, Singapore	W15	Hard (i)	(Japan) Rinko Matsuda	6–7^{(4)}, 2–6
Win	10–8	May 2026	ITF Andong, South Korea	W35	Hard	(South Korea) Jeong Bo-young	3–6, 6–2, 6–0
Win	11–8	May 2026	ITF Changwon, South Korea	W35	Hard	(South Korea) Lee Ha-eum	6–1, 6–2
Win	12–8	Jun 2026	ITF Taipei, Chinese Taipei	W35	Hard	(Japan) Haruka Kaji	6–1, 7–5
Loss	12–9	Jul 2026	ITF Horb, Germany	W50	Clay	(Sweden) Lea Nilsson	6–7^{(3)}, 2–6

=== Doubles: 27 (16 titles, 11 runner-ups) ===
Legend W75 tournaments (0–1) W50 tournaments (0–1) W35 tournaments (9–1) W15 tournaments (7–8)	Finals by surface Hard (14–9) Clay (2–2)

Result	W–L	Date	Tournament	Tier	Surface	Partner	Opponents	Score
Win	1–0	Oct 2021	ITF Antalya, Turkey	W15	Clay	(China) Tian Fangran	(Turkey) Doğa Türkmen (Turkey) Melis Ayda Uyar	7–6^{(5)}, 6–1
Loss	1–1	Nov 2021	ITF Antalya, Turkey	W15	Clay	(China) Tian Fangran	(Russia) Ksenia Laskutova (Russia) Aleksandra Pospelova	6–2, 2–6, [6–10]
Win	2–1	Nov 2021	ITF Antalya, Turkey	W15	Clay	(China) Tian Fangran	(Russia) Anna Chekanskaya (Georgia (country)) Zoziya Kardava	7–5, 6–3
Loss	2–2	Jul 2022	ITF Monastir, Tunisia	W15	Hard	(South Korea) Jeong Bo-young	(Indonesia) Priska Madelyn Nugroho (China) Wei Sijia	4–6, 1–6
Win	3–2	Sep 2022	ITF Yeongwol, South Korea	W15	Hard	(South Korea) Lee Eun-hye	(Japan) Junri Namigata (Japan) Riko Sawayanagi	7–5, 3–6, [13–11]
Loss	3–3	Sep 2022	ITF Yeongwol, South Korea	W15	Hard	(South Korea) Lee Eun-hye	(South Korea) Kim Da-bin (South Korea) Lee So-ra	4–6, 6–3, [10–12]
Loss	3–4	Mar 2023	ITF Sharm El Sheikh, Egypt	W15	Hard	(South Korea) Jeong Bo-young	(Russia) Polina Iatcenko (Egypt) Sandra Samir	4–6, 5–7
Loss	3–5	Aug 2023	ITF Sapporo, Japan	W15	Hard	(South Korea) Jeong Bo-young	(Japan) Mushika Mao (Japan) Himari Satō	3–6, 4–6
Loss	3–6	Aug 2023	ITF Sapporo, Japan	W15	Hard	(South Korea) Jeong Bo-young	(Japan) Nana Kawagishi (Japan) Kisa Yoshioka	3–6, 3–6
Loss	3–7	Sep 2023	ITF Yeongwol, South Korea	W15	Hard	(South Korea) Jeong Bo-young	(South Korea) Kim Da-bin (South Korea) Kim Na-ri	2–6, 3–6
Win	4–7	May 2024	ITF Monastir, Tunisia	W15	Hard	(Colombia) María Herazo González	(Japan) Natsuho Arakawa (China) Zhang Ying	6–4, 6–4
Loss	4–8	Jul 2024	ITF Ust-Kamenogorsk, Kazakhstan	W15	Hard	(Japan) Ayumi Koshiishi	(Russia) Aglaya Fedorova; Daria Khomutsianskaya	6–7^{(4)}, 2–6
Win	5–8	Aug 2024	ITF Ust-Kamenogorsk, Kazakhstan	W15	Hard	(Russia) Anastasia Sukhotina	(Russia) Varvara Panshina (Uzbekistan) Daria Shubina	6–3, 6–1
Win	6–8	Sep 2024	ITF Yeongwol, South Korea	W15	Hard	(South Korea) Lee Eun-hye	(South Korea) Kim Na-ri (China) Ye Qiuyu	6–1, 6–1
Win	7–8	Feb 2025	ITF Timaru, New Zealand	W35	Hard	(South Korea) Lee Eun-hye	(South Korea) Choi On-yu (Japan) Nanari Katsumi	7–5, 6–3
Win	8–8	May 2025	ITF Andong, South Korea	W35	Hard	(South Korea) Lee Eun-hye	(South Korea) Han Hyeong-ju (South Korea) Kim Eun-chae	3–6, 6–2, [10–4]
Win	9–8	May 2025	ITF Daegu, South Korea	W15	Hard	(South Korea) Lee Eun-hye	(South Korea) Kim Da-bin (South Korea) Ku Yeon-woo	6–1, 6–1
Win	10–8	Jul 2025	ITF Monastir, Tunisia	W35	Hard	(South Korea) Ku Yeon-woo	(Japan) Sakura Hosogi (Japan) Misaki Matsuda	6–3, 6–3
Loss	10–9	Jul 2025	ITF Monastir, Tunisia	W35	Hard	(India) Vaidehi Chaudhari	(Australia) Tenika McGiffin (Latvia) Elza Tomase	6–3, 3–6, [8–10]
Loss	10–10	Nov 2025	City of Playford Tennis International, Australia	W75	Hard	(South Korea) Lee Eun-hye	(Australia) Talia Gibson (Australia) Maddison Inglis	2–6, 0–6
Win	11–10	Feb 2026	ITF Monastir, Tunisia	W35	Hard	(Greece) Sapfo Sakellaridi	(Russia) Alina Yuneva (Russia) Daria Egorova	6–3, 6–2
Win	12–10	Apr 2026	ITF Goyang, South Korea	W35	Hard	(United States) Jaeda Daniel	(South Korea) Kim Da-bin (South Korea) Park So-hyun	6–4, 6–0
Win	13–10	May 2026	ITF Changwon, South Korea	W35	Hard	(China) Guo Meiqi	(United States) Hanna Chang (South Korea) Jang Ga-eul	7–5, 7–5
Win	14–10	May 2026	ITF Andong, South Korea	W35	Hard	(South Korea) Jang Su-jeong	(South Korea) Jeong Bo-young (South Korea) Park So-hyun	6–4, 6–3
Win	15–10	Jun 2026	ITF Taipei, Chinese Taipei	W35	Hard	(Chinese Taipei) Tsao Chia-yi	(Japan) Natsumi Kawaguchi (Japan) Ayano Shimizu	7–5, 6–1
Loss	15–11	Jul 2026	ITF Horb, Germany	W50	Clay	(South Korea) Park So-hyun	(Greece) Sapfo Sakellaridi (France) Lucie Nguyen Tan	2–6, 6–2, [7–10]
Win	16–11	Oct 2026	ITF Sydney, Australia	W35	Hard	(Japan) Ikumi Yamazaki	(Japan) Hikaru Sato (New Zealand) Elyse Tse	2–6, 6–4, [10–5]

== Billie Jean King Cup participation ==
=== Singles (10–3) ===
Edition	Round	Date	Location	Against	Opponent	W/L	Score
2023 BJK Cup	Asia/Oceania Zone	12 April 2023	Tashkent, Uzbekistan	China	(China) Wushuang Zheng	W	6–3, 6–4
2023 BJK Cup	Asia/Oceania Zone	14 April 2023	Tashkent, Uzbekistan	Uzbekistan	(Uzbekistan) Sevil Yuldasheva	W	6–2, 6–3
2023 BJK Cup	2024 Billie Jean King Cup play-offs	14 April 2023	Tashkent, Uzbekistan	Uzbekistan	(Kazakhstan) Zarina Diyas	L	6–3, 3–6,^{(1)}6–7
2024 BJK Cup	2024 Billie Jean King Cup play-offs	9 February 2024	Astana, Kazakhstan	Kazakhstan	(Kazakhstan) Zarina Diyas	L	6–3, 3–6,^{(1)}6–7
2025 BJK Cup	Asia/Oceania Zone	8 April 2025	Pune, India	Chinese Taipei	(Chinese Taipei) Joanna Garland	W	6–4, 2–6, 6–4
2025 BJK Cup	Asia/Oceania Zone	9 April 2026	Pune, India	New Zealand	(New Zealand) Lulu Sun	L	4–6, 1–6
2025 BJK Cup	Asia/Oceania Zone	10 April 2026	Pune, India	Thailand	(Thailand) Mananchaya Sawangkaew	L	4–6, 2–6
2025 BJK Cup	Asia/Oceania Zone	11 April 2026	Pune, India	Hong Kong	(Hong Kong) Cody Wong	W	6–3, 7–5
2025 BJK Cup	Asia/Oceania Zone	12 April 2026	Pune, India	India	(India) Sahaja Yamalapalli	W	6–3, 6–4
2026 BJK Cup	Asia/Oceania Zone	7 April 2026	New Delhi, India	Mongolia	(Mongolia) Khongorzul Aldarkhishig	W	6–0, 6–0
2026 BJK Cup	Asia/Oceania Zone	8 April 2026	New Delhi, India	Thailand	(Thailand) Anchisa Chanta	W	6–3, 6–4
2026 BJK Cup	Asia/Oceania Zone	9 April 2026	New Delhi, India	New Zealand	(New Zealand) Valentina Ivanov	W	7–5, 6–3
2026 BJK Cup	Asia/Oceania Zone	10 April 2026	New Delhi, India	Indonesia	(Indonesia) Priska Madelyn Nugroho	W	7–5, 3–6, 6–2
2026 BJK Cup	Asia/Oceania Zone	11 April 2026	New Delhi, India	India	(India) Ankita Raina	W	6–1, 7–5

=== Doubles (2–3) ===
Edition	Round	Date	Location	Against	Partner	Opponents	W/L	Score
2023 BJK Cup	Asia/Oceania Zone	13 April 2023	Tashkent, Uzbekistan	Thailand	(South Korea) Choi Ji-hee	(Thailand) Luksika Kumkhum (Thailand) Peangtarn Plipuech	L	^{(2)}6–7, 1–6
2023 BJK Cup	2023 Billie Jean King Cup play-offs	11 November 2023	Brasília, Brazil	Brazil	(South Korea) Jeong Bo-young	(Brazil) Ingrid Martins (Brazil) Luisa Stefani	L	1–6, 2–6
2026 BJK Cip	Asia/Oceania Zone	8 April 2026	(India) New Delhi, Brazil	Thailand	(South Korea) Lee Eun-hye	(Thailand) Thasaporn Naklo (Thailand) Kamonwan Yodpetch	W	6–4, 7–6^{(4)}
2026 BJK Cip	Asia/Oceania Zone	9 April 2026	(India) New Delhi, Brazil	New Zealand	(South Korea) Lee Eun-hye	(New Zealand) Aishi Das (New Zealand) Valentina Ivanov	W	6–3, 3–6, [10–8]
2026 BJK Cip	Asia/Oceania Zone	10 April 2026	(India) New Delhi, Brazil	India	(South Korea) Lee Eun-hye	(India) Rutuja Bhosale (India) Ankita Raina	L	2–6, 2–6

== Top 5 highest rank wins ==
#	Tournament	Category	Start date	Surface	Rd	Opponent	Rank	Score	PSR
1	Korea Open, South Korea	WTA 250	9 October 2023	Hard	1R	(Latvia) Jeļena Ostapenko	No. 13	3–6, 6–1, 7–6^{(4)}	No. 569
2	Korea Open, South Korea	WTA 250	21 September 2026	Hard	1R	(China) Yuan Yue	No. 134	6–3, 4–6, 6–1	No. 272
3	Korea Open, South Korea	WTA 250	19 September 2022	Hard	Q1	(Israel) Lina Glushko	No. 218	7–5, 1–6, 6–1	No. 679
4	Incheon Open, South Korea	ITF W100	2 September 2024	Hard	1R	(China) Ma Yexin	No. 223	6–4, 6–3	No. 344
5	Gold Coast Tennis International, Australia	ITF W60	27 November 2023	Hard	1R	(Australia) Seone Mendez	No. 234	6–3, 6–3	No. 480

- statistics correct as of 19 September 2026.
