= Natsumi Kawaguchi =

Japanese tennis player (born 2002)

Natsumi Kawaguchi 川口夏実
- Country (sports): Japan
- Born: 28 June 2002 (age 24) Nagasaki Prefecture, Japan
- Height: 1.63 m (5 ft 4 in)
- Plays: Left (two-handed backhand)
- Prize money: $89,763

Singles
- Career record: 155–99
- Career titles: 4 ITF
- Highest ranking: No. 346 (9 October 2023)
- Current ranking: No. 384 (27 July 2026)

Doubles
- Career record: 108–78
- Career titles: 7 ITF
- Highest ranking: No. 230 (29 June 2026)
- Current ranking: No. 230 (27 July 2026)
- Last updated on: 31 July 2026.

Natsumi Kawaguchi (川口夏実, Kawaguchi Natsumi; born 28 June 2002) is a Japanese tennis player.

On 9 October 2023, she has achieved career-high rankings of 346 in singles, and on 29 June 2026 of 230 in doubles.

Kawaguchi and her partner Adrienn Nagy won the 2019 Australian girls' doubles title, beating Emma Navarro and Chloe Beck in the final.

She qualified for the main draw of the WTA 500 2023 Pan Pacific Open at home in Tokyo but had to withdraw shortly after.

== ITF Circuit finals ==
=== Singles: 6 (4 titles, 2 runner-ups) ===
Legend
W60 tournaments
W35 tournaments
W15 tournaments

Result	W–L	Date	Tournament	Tier	Surface	Opponent	Score
Win	1–0	Apr 2019	ITF Cancún, Mexico	W15	Hard	(United Kingdom) Emily Appleton	7–6^{(2)}, 6–7^{(2)}, 6–3
Loss	1–1	Oct 2021	ITF Monastir, Tunisia	W15	Hard	(Austria) Tamira Paszek	2–6, 3–6
Win	2–1	Mar 2023	ITF Hinode, Japan	W15	Hard	(Japan) Aoi Ito	6–4, 6–3
Win	3–1	Apr 2023	ITF Osaka, Japan	W15	Hard	(Japan) Miho Kuramochi	6–4, 6–1
Win	4–1	May 2023	Fukuoka International, Japan	W60	Carpet	(United Kingdom) Katie Boulter	w/o
Loss	4–2	Oct 2025	Brisbane QTC International, Australia	W35	Hard	(Australia) Taylah Preston	2–6, 4–6

=== Doubles: 17 (7 titles, 10 runner-ups) ===
Legend
W100 tournaments
W75 tournaments
W40/50 tournaments
W25/35 tournaments
W15 tournaments

Result	W–L	Date	Tournament	Tier	Surface	Partner	Opponents	Score
Win	1–0	Apr 2019	ITF Cancún, Mexico	W15	Hard	(Israel) Maya Tahan	(United Kingdom) Emily Appleton (Mexico) María Portillo Ramírez	6–1, 6–2
Loss	1–1	Dec 2019	ITF Cancún, Mexico	W15	Hard	(Russia) Nika Kukharchuk	(United States) Madison Appel (United States) Elle Christensen	w/o
Loss	1–2	Jun 2023	ITF Tokyo, Japan	W25	Hard	(Australia) Talia Gibson	(Thailand) Luksika Kumkhum (Japan) Kanako Morisaki	6–1, 2–6, [3–10]
Loss	1–3	Jul 2023	ITF Hong Kong, China	W40	Hard	(Japan) Kanako Morisaki	(Hong Kong) Eudice Chong (Hong Kong) Cody Wong	5–7, 4–6
Win	2–3	Oct 2023	ITF Hamamatsu, Japan	W25	Carpet	(Japan) Hiromi Abe	(Japan) Haruna Arakawa (Japan) Aoi Ito	3–6, 6–4, [10–4]
Loss	2–4	Dec 2023	ITF Yokohama, Japan	W40	Hard	(Japan) Aoi Ito	(Chinese Taipei) Liang En-shuo (China) Tang Qianhui	w/o
Win	3–4	Aug 2024	ITF Nakhon Si Thammarat, Thailand	W15	Hard	(Japan) Momoko Kobori	(Japan) Honoka Kobayashi (Japan) Yukina Saigo	6–3, 6–4
Loss	3–5	Aug 2024	ITF Nakhon Si Thammarat, Thailand	W35	Hard	(Japan) Momoko Kobori	(Japan) Kanako Morisaki (Japan) Hikaru Sato	2–6, 3–6
Loss	3–6	Jul 2025	ITF Nakhon Pathom, Thailand	W15	Hard	(Japan) Haruna Arakawa	(South Korea) Kim Na-ri (China) Ye Qiuyu	3–6, 2–6
Win	4–6	Aug 2025	ITF Singapore	W15	Hard	(Japan) Haruna Arakawa	(Japan) Natsuho Arakawa (Japan) Anri Nagata	6–2, 6–2
Loss	4–7	Sep 2025	ITF Nakhon Pathom, Thailand	W35	Hard	(Japan) Erika Sema	(Japan) Mana Ayukawa (Japan) Eri Shimizu	2–6, 7–6^{(5)}, [8–10]
Win	5–7	Sep 2025	ITF Yeongwol, South Korea	W15	Hard	(South Korea) Kim Da-bin	(South Korea) Ha Sun-min (Hong Kong) Shek Cheuk-ying	6–4, 6–2
Win	6–7	Oct 2025	Brisbane QTC International, Australia	W35	Hard	(New Zealand) Monique Barry	(Australia) Tenika McGiffin (Japan) Naho Sato	7–5, 6–3
Loss	6–8	Nov 2025	Yokohama Challenger, Japan	W50	Hard	(Japan) Hayu Kinoshita	(China) Dang Yiming (China) You Xiaodi	6–2, 3–6, [4–10]
Win	7–8	Feb 2026	Queensland International, Australia	W75	Hard	(Japan) Sara Saito	(Australia) Gabriella Da Silva-Fick (Australia) Tenika McGiffin	6–2, 6–4
Loss	7–9	Jun 2026	ITF Taipei, Taiwan	W35	Hard	(Japan) Ayano Shimizu	(South Korea) Back Da-yeon (Chinese Taipei) Tsao Chia-yi	5–7, 1–6
Loss	7–10	Nov 2026	Incheon Open, South Korea	W100	Hard	(Japan) Hikaru Sato	Ekaterina Ovcharenko; Valeria Savinykh	5–7, 6–1, [11–13]

== Junior finals ==
=== Grand Slam tournaments ===
==== Girls' doubles ====
Result	Year	Tournament	Surface	Partner	Opponents	Score
Win	2019	Australian Open	Hard	(Hungary) Adrienn Nagy	(United States) Emma Navarro (United States) Chloe Beck	6–4, 6–4
