= Roisin Gilheany =

Australian tennis player (born 2005)

- Country (sports): Australia
- Born: 17 May 2005 (age 21) Melbourne, Australia
- Plays: Right (two-handed backhand)
- Prize money: $9,030

Singles
- Career record: 11–15
- Career titles: 0
- Highest ranking: No. 1226 (26 December 2022)

Doubles
- Career record: 12–9
- Career titles: 1 ITF
- Highest ranking: No. 413 (9 September 2024)
- Last updated on: 10 June 2026.

Roisin Gilheany (born 17 May 2005) is an Australian tennis player.

She has a career-high WTA ranking in doubles of 414, achieved on 12 August 2024.

== Early life ==
Gilheany, born in Melbourne, is the daughter of Ireland's Sinead O Donovan. Her brother Pierce is a college tennis player in the United States. She trains at the Soto Tennis Academy in Sotogrande, Spain, and plays for the Port Melbourne Tennis Club.

Gilheany won her first major ITF title at the W60 doubles tournament in Gold Coast, Australia.

== ITF Circuit finals ==
=== Doubles: 4 (3 title, 1 runner-up) ===
Legend W60 tournaments W25 tournaments W15 tournaments	Finals by surface Hard (3–1)

Result	W–L	Date	Tournament	Tier	Surface	Partner	Opponents	Score
Loss	0–1	Oct 2023	ITF Cairns, Australia	W25	Hard	(Australia) Alicia Smith	(Australia) Destanee Aiava (Australia) Taylah Preston	6–7^{(5)}, 5–7
Win	1–1	Dec 2023	Gold Coast International, Australia	W60	Hard	(Australia) Maya Joint	(Australia) Melisa Ercan (Australia) Alicia Smith	7–6^{(3)}, 6–1
Win	2–1	Jul 2026	ITF Brisbane, Australia	W15	Hard	(Australia) Lily Fairclough	(Chinese Taipei) Lin Fang-an (Chinese Taipei) Yang Ya-yi	7–6^{(2)}, 7–5
Win	3–1	Jul 2026	ITF Brisbane, Australia	W15	Hard	(Australia) Lily Fairclough	(Japan) Mana Kawamura (Japan) Himari Satō	6–2, 6–2
