= Yang Ya-yi =

Taiwanese tennis player (born 2004)

Yang Ya-yi 楊亞依
- Country (sports): Chinese Taipei
- Born: 30 May 2004 (age 22) Keelung, Taiwan
- Plays: Right (two-handed backhand)
- Prize money: $153,539

Singles
- Career record: 159–112
- Career titles: 6 ITF
- Highest ranking: No. 203 (16 October 2023)
- Current ranking: No. 513 (24 August 2026)

Grand Slam singles results
- Australian Open: Q1 (2024)
- French Open: Q1 (2024)
- Wimbledon: Q1 (2024)

Doubles
- Career record: 70–61
- Career titles: 6 ITF
- Highest ranking: No. 289 (18 September 2023)
- Current ranking: No. 472 (24 August 2026)

Team competitions
- Fed Cup: 10–13
Medal record
Women's tennis
Representing Chinese Taipei
World University Games
Gold medal – first place	2021 Chengdu	Team
Silver medal – second place	2021 Chengdu	Singles
- Last updated on: 30 August 2026.

Yang Ya-yi
- Traditional Chinese: 楊亞依
- Simplified Chinese: 杨亚依
Transcriptions
Standard Mandarin
- Hanyu Pinyin: Yáng Yàyī

Yang Ya-yi (Chinese: 楊亞依; pinyin: Yáng Yàyī; born 30 May 2004) is a Taiwanese tennis player.

She has a career-high junior singles ranking by the International Tennis Federation (ITF) of 4, achieved on 26 December 2022. Her career-high by the Women's Tennis Association (WTA) is 203, achieved on 16 October 2023. On 18 September 2023, she peaked at No. 289 in the WTA doubles rankings.

Yang, who started playing tennis when she was three years old, represents the colours of Chinese Taipei in the Billie Jean King Cup.

== Career ==
=== Junior Grand Slam performance ===
- Singles:

- Australian Open: 2R (2020)
- French Open: –
- Wimbledon: –
- US Open: 1R (2021)

- Doubles:

- Australian Open: 2R (2020)
- French Open: –
- Wimbledon: –
- US Open: 1R (2021)

=== Professional ===
Yang made her WTA Tour debut at the 2023 Guadalajara Open, where she entered the main draw as a qualifier, losing in the first round to fourth seed Lucia Bronzetti.

== ITF Circuit finals ==
=== Singles: 10 (6 titles, 4 runner-ups) ===
Legend
W40 tournaments
W25 tournaments
W15 tournaments

Result	W–L	Date	Tournament	Tier	Surface	Opponent	Score
Win	1–0	May 2022	ITF Cairo, Egypt	W15	Clay	(Austria) Melanie Klaffner	6–3, 6–3
Loss	1–1	May 2022	ITF Cairo, Egypt	W15	Clay	(Germany) Noma Noha Akugue	1–6, 1–6
Loss	1–2	Jun 2022	ITF San Diego, United States	W15	Hard	(China) Han Jiangxue	2–6, 6–4, 4–6
Win	2–2	Jul 2022	ITF Fountain Valley, US	W15	Hard	(United States) Makenna Jones	6–2, 6–2
Win	3–2	Jun 2023	ITF Tainan, Taiwan	W25	Clay	(Chinese Taipei) Lee Ya-hsuan	6–3, 6–1
Win	4–2	Jun 2023	ITF Tainan, Taiwan	W25	Clay	(Chinese Taipei) Lee Pei-chi	6–2, 6–1
Win	5–2	Jul 2023	ITF Hong Kong, China SAR	W25	Hard	(Hong Kong) Eudice Chong	1–6, 6–2, 6–1
Win	6–2	Aug 2023	ITF Hong Kong	W40	Hard	(Thailand) Mananchaya Sawangkaew	6–3, 4–6, 6–3
Loss	6–3	Oct 2023	ITF Nanao, China	W40	Carpet	(China) Ma Yexin	6–7^{(6)}, 7–6^{(0)}, 0–6
Loss	6–4	Aug 2025	ITF Lu'an, China	W15	Hard	(South Korea) Jeong Bo-young	4–6, 2–6

=== Doubles: 10 (6 titles, 4 runner-ups) ===
Legend
W25/35 tournaments
W15 tournaments

Result	W–L	Date	Tournament	Tier	Surface	Partner	Opponents	Score
Win	1–0	Jun 2022	ITF San Diego, US	W15	Hard	(Thailand) Bunyawi Thamchaiwat	(United States) Sara Daavettila (United States) Makenna Jones	6–3, 6–4
Loss	1–1	Jul 2022	ITF Los Angeles, US	W15	Hard	(Thailand) Bunyawi Thamchaiwat	(United States) Eryn Cayetano (United States) Salma Ewing	3–6, 6–4, [8–10]
Win	2–1	Aug 2022	ITF Fountain Valley, US	W15	Hard	(United States) Hind Abdelouahid	(China) Han Jiangxue (South Korea) Kim Da-bin	7–5, 2–6, [10–6]
Loss	2–2	Sep 2022	ITF Otočec, Slovenia	W25	Clay	(Egypt) Sandra Samir	Irina Khromacheva; Iryna Shymanovich	2–6, 4–6
Win	3–2	Oct 2022	ITF Sozopol, Bulgaria	W25	Hard	(China) Ma Yexin	(Romania) Cristina Dinu (China) Lu Jiajing	6–3, 6–1
Win	4–2	Jun 2023	ITF Tainan, Taiwan	W25	Clay	(Chinese Taipei) Tsao Chia-yi	(New Zealand) Monique Barry (Chinese Taipei) Lee Ya-hsin	6–2, 6–2
Win	5–2	Aug 2025	ITF Lu'an, China	W15	Hard	(Chinese Taipei) Lin Fang-an	(Sweden) Tiana Tian Deng (China) Wang Meiling	6–4, 7–6^{(4)}
Win	6–2	Sep 2025	ITF Wagga Wagga, Australia	W35	Hard	(Japan) Hayu Kinoshita	(Japan) Erika Sema (New Zealand) Elyse Tse	6–1, 3–6, [10–8]
Loss	6–3	Jul 2026	ITF Brisbane, Australia	W15	Hard	(Chinese Taipei) Lin Fang-an	(Australia) Lily Fairclough (Australia) Roisin Gilheany	6–7^{(2)}, 5–7
Loss	6–4	Aug 2026	ITF Tianjin, China	W15	Hard	(Chinese Taipei) Lin Fang-an	(Thailand) Kamonwan Yodpetch (China) Zhang Ruien	3–6, 6–1, [7–10]
