= Miho Kuramochi =

Japanese tennis player (born 1998)

Miho Kuramochi 倉持 美穂
- Country (sports): Japan
- Born: 9 June 1998 (age 28) Kanagawa, Japan
- Plays: Right (two-handed backhand)
- Prize money: $85,727

Singles
- Career record: 170–119
- Career titles: 2 ITF
- Highest ranking: No. 326 (16 March 2026)
- Current ranking: No. 362 (14 September 2026)

Doubles
- Career record: 59–43
- Career titles: 4 ITF
- Highest ranking: No. 406 (17 March 2025)
- Last updated on: 25 May 2026.

Miho Kuramochi (倉持 美穂, Kuramochi Miho; born 9 June 1998) is a Japanese tennis player.

In November 2021, she won her first championship in doubles at the ITF tournament in Cancún, Mexico.

In May 2022, she won the championship in doubles with her partner and compatriot Saki Imamura at the ITF tournament in Cancún, Mexico.

In February 2025, she achieved the biggest championship of her career in Brisbane, Australia. She won the championship in doubles at the W75 tournament with her Chinese partner Zheng Wushuang.

== ITF Circuit finals ==
=== Singles: 7 (3 titles, 4 runner-ups) ===
Legend W50 tournaments W35 tournaments W15 tournaments	Finals by surface Hard (2–3) Clay (1–0) Carpet (0–1)

Result	W–L	Date	Tournament	Tier	Surface	Opponent	Score
Win	1–0	Mar 2023	ITF Antalya, Turkey	W15	Clay	(Czech Republic) Julie Štruplová	7–6^{(4)}, 6–4
Loss	1–1	Apr 2023	ITF Osaka, Japan	W15	Hard	(Japan) Natsumi Kawaguchi	4–6, 1–6
Win	2–1	Apr 2023	ITF Fukui, Japan	W15	Hard	(Chinese Taipei) Lee Ya-hsuan	7–5, 3–0 ret.
Loss	2–2	Aug 2023	ITF Sapporo, Japan	W15	Hard	(South Korea) Back Da-yeon	2–6, 0–6
Loss	2–3	Aug 2023	ITF Nakhon Si Thammarat, Thailand	W15	Hard	(Thailand) Patcharin Cheapchandej	3–6, 2–6
Loss	2–4	Oct 2024	ITF Makinohara, Japan	W35	Carpet	(Japan) Ayano Shimizu	6–3, 3–6, 4–6
Win	3–4	Jun 2026	ITF Sapporo, Japan	W15	Hard	(Japan) Ayumi Miyamoto	6–3, 3–6, 7–6^{(9)}

=== Doubles: 10 (4 titles, 6 runner-ups) ===
Legend W75 tournaments W40/50 tournaments W25/35 tournaments W15 tournaments	Finals by surface Hard (4–3) Clay (0–1) Carpet (0–2)

Result	W–L	Date	Tournament	Tier	Surface	Partner	Opponents	Score
Win	1–0	Nov 2021	ITF Cancún, Mexico	W15	Hard	(Japan) Minami Akiyama	(United Kingdom) Amelia Bissett (France) Anaëlle Leclercq	7–6^{(6)}, 2–6, [10–8]
Loss	1–1	Dec 2021	ITF Cancún, Mexico	W15	Hard	(Japan) Minami Akiyama	(Spain) Alicia Herrero Liñana (Argentina) Melany Krywoj	4–6, 2–6
Win	2–1	May 2022	ITF Cancún, Mexico	W15	Hard	(Japan) Saki Imamura	(United States) Kariann Pierre-Louis (Dominican Republic) Kelly Williford	3–6, 6–3, [10–8]
Loss	2–2	Jan 2023	ITF Monastir, Tunisia	W25	Hard	(Chinese Taipei) Tsao Chia-yi	(Romania) Oana Gavrilă (Greece) Sapfo Sakellaridi	5–7, 6–4, [6–10]
Loss	2–3	Mar 2023	ITF Antalya, Turkey	W15	Clay	(Serbia) Bojana Marinkovic	(Brazil) Ana Candiotto (Romania) Simona Ogescu	3–6, 4–6
Loss	2–4	Oct 2023	ITF Nanao, Japan	W40	Carpet	(Japan) Kanako Morisaki	(Japan) Aoi Ito (Japan) Erika Sema	2–6, 5–7
Win	3–4	Apr 2024	ITF Osaka, Japan	W35	Hard	(Japan) Natsuho Arakawa	(Australia) Lizette Cabrera (United States) Dalayna Hewitt	6–4, 3–6, [10–7]
Win	4–4	Feb 2025	Brisbane QCT International, Australia	W75	Hard	(China) Zheng Wushuang	(France) Tessah Andrianjafitrimo (Norway) Malene Helgø	7–6^{(6)}, 6–3
Loss	4–5	Feb 2025	Launceston International, Australia	W35	Hard	(Japan) Erika Sema	(New Zealand) Monique Barry (Australia) Elena Micic	2–6, 4–6
Loss	4–6	Apr 2025	Fukuoka International, Japan	W35	Hard	(Japan) Akiko Omae	(Japan) Momoko Kobori (Japan) Ayano Shimizu	6–4, 2–6, [8–10]
