= Lin Fang-an =

Taiwanese tennis player (born 2005)

- Country (sports): Chinese Taipei
- Born: 16 May 2005 (age 21)
- Plays: Right (two-handed backhand)
- Prize money: $30,129

Singles
- Career record: 69–81
- Highest ranking: No. 821 (21 October 2024)
- Current ranking: No. 1,155 (24 August 2026)

Doubles
- Career record: 99–65
- Career titles: 7 ITF
- Highest ranking: No. 326 (31 March 2025)
- Current ranking: No. 528 (24 August 2026)
Medal record
Representing Chinese Taipei
World University Games
| Silver medal – second place | 2025 Rhine-Ruhr | Doubles |
- Last updated on: 30 August 2026.

Lin Fang-an (born 16 May 2005) is a Taiwanese professional tennis player.

On 31 March 2025, she reached a career-high doubles ranking of world No. 326. She has won seven doubles titles on the ITF Women's World Tour.

Playing for Chinese Taipei, she has a 0–4 win/loss record in BJK Cup competitions.

Lin won her first major ITF title at the W50 doubles tournament in Fuzhou, China.

== ITF Circuit finals ==
=== Doubles: 16 (8 titles, 8 runner-ups) ===
| Legend W50 tournaments W35 tournaments W15 tournaments | Finals by surface Hard (8–8) |

| Result | W–L | Date | Tournament | Tier | Surface | Partner | Opponents | Score |
|---|---|---|---|---|---|---|---|---|
| Loss | 0–1 | Sep 2022 | ITF Sharm El Sheikh, Egypt | W15 | Hard | (Chinese Taipei) Chen Pei-hsuan | Aliona Falei (Georgia (country)) Nino Natsvlishvili | 3–6, 4–6 |
| Loss | 0–2 | Sep 2023 | ITF Shenzhen, China | W15 | Hard | (China) Yuan Chengyiyi | (China) Xun Fangying (China) Zheng Wushuang | 5–7, 4–6 |
| Win | 1–2 | Dec 2023 | ITF Sharm El Sheikh, Egypt | W15 | Hard | (South Korea) Kim Yu-jin | Alisa Kummel; Ekaterina Makarova | 6–4, 7–6^{(5)} |
| Loss | 1–3 | Mar 2024 | ITF Kuala Lumpur, Malaysia | W15 | Hard | (China) Yuan Chengyiyi | (Chinese Taipei) Cho I-hsuan (Chinese Taipei) Cho Yi-tsen | 3–6, 5–7 |
| Loss | 1–4 | May 2024 | ITF Fukui, Japan | W15 | Hard | (South Korea) Kim Yu-jin | (Japan) Hiromi Abe (Japan) Anri Nagata | 4–6, 0–6 |
| Loss | 1–5 | Jun 2024 | ITF Taipei, Taiwan | W35 | Hard | (Chinese Taipei) Hsieh Yu-chieh | (Chinese Taipei) Cho I-hsuan (Chinese Taipei) Cho Yi-tsen | 2–6, 6–1, [5–10] |
| Win | 2–5 | Sep 2024 | ITF Fuzhou, China | W50 | Hard | (Chinese Taipei) Lee Ya-hsin | (Chinese Taipei) Cho I-hsuan (Chinese Taipei) Cho Yi-tsen | 6–3, 6–4 |
| Win | 3–5 | Sep 2024 | ITF Yeongwol, South Korea | W15 | Hard | (Chinese Taipei) Lee Ya-hsin | (South Korea) Jeong Su-nam (China) Ye Qiuyu | 6–4, 6–7^{(6)}, [10–6] |
| Win | 4–5 | Aug 2025 | ITF Lu'an, China | W15 | Hard | (South Korea) Kim Da-bin | (China) Huang Yujia (China) Xiao Zhenghua | 5–7, 6–3, [10–5] |
| Win | 5–5 | Aug 2025 | ITF Lu'an, China | W15 | Hard | (Chinese Taipei) Yang Ya-yi | (Sweden) Deng Tiana Tian (China) Wang Meiling | 6–4, 7–6^{(4)} |
| Win | 6–5 | Oct 2025 | Brisbane QTC International, Australia | W35 | Hard | (Chinese Taipei) Lee Ya-hsin | (Japan) Naho Sato (Australia) Tenika McGiffin | 6–7^{(6)}, 6–4, [10–8] |
| Win | 7–5 | Apr 2026 | ITF Singapore | W15 | Hard (i) | (South Korea) Shin Ji-ho | (Japan) Erika Sema (Chinese Taipei) Tsao Chia-yi | 7–6^{(1)}, 5–7, [10–5] |
| Loss | 7–6 | Jul 2026 | ITF Brisbane, Australia | W15 | Hard | (Chinese Taipei) Yang Ya-yi | (Australia) Lily Fairclough (Australia) Roisin Gilheany | 6–7^{(2)}, 5–7 |
| Loss | 7–7 | Aug 2026 | ITF Tianjin, China | W15 | Hard | (Chinese Taipei) Yang Ya-yi | (Thailand) Kamonwan Yodpetch (China) Zhang Ruien | 3–6, 6–1, [7–10] |
| Loss | 7–8 | Oct 2026 | ITF Singapore | W15 | Hard | (China) Lu Jingjing | (Thailand) Anchisa Chanta (Thailand) Thasaporn Naklo | 1–6, 3–6 |
| Win | 8–8 | Oct 2026 | ITF Singapore | W15 | Hard | (South Korea) Kim Yu-jin | (Japan) Nagi Hanatani (China) Lu Jingjing | 6–1, 6–1 |
