= Erina Hayashi =

Japanese tennis player (born 1994)

Erina Hayashi 林恵里奈
- Country (sports): Japan
- Born: 21 July 1994 (age 32) Sabae, Fukui, Japan
- Height: 1.68 m (5 ft 6 in)
- Plays: Right (two-handed backhand)
- Prize money: $65,423

Singles
- Career record: 106–87
- Career titles: 1 ITF
- Highest ranking: No. 322 (24 February 2020)

Doubles
- Career record: 158–95
- Career titles: 11 ITF
- Highest ranking: No. 210 (16 March 2020)
- Last updated on: 20 May 2026.

Erina Hayashi (林 恵里奈, Hayashi Erina; born 21 July 1994) is an inactive Japanese tennis player. She has career-high WTA rankings of 322 in singles, achieved on 24 February 2020, and No. 210 in doubles, reached on 16 March 2020. She has won one singles title and eleven doubles titles on the ITF Women's Circuit.

== Career ==
Hayashi made her main-draw debut on the WTA Tour at the 2017 Japan Women's Open, where she received a wildcard alongside Momoko Kobori for the doubles competition.

== ITF Circuit finals ==
=== Singles: 2 (1 title, 1 runner-up) ===
Legend
$25,000 tournaments
$10,000 tournaments

Result	W–L	Date	Tournament	Tier	Surface	Opponent	Score
Loss	0–1	Jun 2016	ITF Kaohsiung, Taiwan	10,000	Hard	(China) Zhang Ying	0–6, 6–7^{(5)}
Win	1–1	Jun 2019	ITF Hong Kong	25,000	Hard	(China) Lu Jiajing	6–3, 3–0 ret.

=== Doubles: 29 (11 titles, 18 runner-ups) ===
Legend
W60/75 tournaments
W40/50 tournaments
W25/35 tournaments
W10/15 tournaments

Result	W–L	Date	Tournament	Tier	Surface	Partner	Opponents	Score
Win	1–0	Apr 2016	Kōfu International Open, Japan	25,000	Hard	(Japan) Shuko Aoyama	(Japan) Kanae Hisami (Japan) Kotomi Takahata	7–5, 7–5
Win	2–0	Jun 2016	ITF Kaohsiung, Taiwan	10,000	Hard	(Japan) Haruka Kaji	(Chinese Taipei) Chen Pei-hsuan (Chinese Taipei) Wu Fang-hsien	6–4, 3–6, [10–7]
Loss	2–1	Apr 2017	Kōfu International Open, Japan	25,000	Hard	(Japan) Robu Kajitani	(South Korea) Han Na-lae (Thailand) Luksika Kumkhum	3–6, 0–6
Loss	2–2	May 2017	Fukuoka International, Japan	60,000	Carpet	(Japan) Robu Kajitani	(Japan) Junri Namigata (Japan) Kotomi Takahata	0–6, 7–6^{(3)}, [7–10]
Loss	2–3	May 2017	Kurume Cup, Japan	60,000	Carpet	(Japan) Robu Kajitani	(United Kingdom) Katy Dunne (Australia) Tammi Patterson	6–7^{(3)}, 6–2, [4–10]
Win	3–3	Feb 2018	ITF Palma Nova, Spain	15,000	Clay	(Japan) Chisa Hosonuma	(Japan) Yukina Saigo (Japan) Aiko Yoshitomi	7–5, 7–5
Loss	3–4	Mar 2018	Kōfu International Open, Japan	25,000	Hard	(Japan) Momoko Kobori	(China) Gao Xinyu (Thailand) Luksika Kumkhum	0–6, 6–2, [4–10]
Win	4–4	Sep 2018	ITF Yeongwol, Korea	15,000	Hard	(Japan) Chisa Hosonuma	(United States) Hanna Chang (China) Zhang Ying	6–1, 6–1
Win	5–4	Oct 2018	ITF Hamamatsu, Japan	25,000	Carpet	(Japan) Miharu Imanishi	(Japan) Momoko Kobori (Japan) Ayano Shimizu	7–5, 6–4
Loss	5–5	May 2019	Kurume Cup, Japan	60,000	Carpet	(Japan) Moyuka Uchijima	(Japan) Hiroko Kuwata (United States) Ena Shibahara	6–0, 4–6, [5–10]
Loss	5–6	May 2019	ITF Karuizawa, Japan	25,000	Carpet	(Japan) Momoko Kobori	(United Kingdom) Naomi Broady (Japan) Ayaka Okuno	3–6, 6–2, [7–10]
Loss	5–7	Jun 2019	ITF Hong Kong, China SAR	25,000	Hard	(Japan) Momoko Kobori	(Japan) Junri Namigata (Papua New Guinea) Abigail Tere-Apisah	3–6, 6–2, [6–10]
Loss	5–8	Aug 2019	ITF Nanao, Japan	25,000	Carpet	(Japan) Miharu Imanishi	(Japan) Kanako Morisaki (Japan) Minori Yonehara	1–6, 3–6
Loss	5–9	Oct 2019	ITF Makinohara, Japan	25,000	Carpet	(Japan) Momoko Kobori	(Hong Kong) Eudice Chong (Indonesia) Aldila Sutjiadi	7–6^{(5)}, 6–7^{(5)}, [4–10]
Win	6–9	Feb 2020	All Japan Indoor Championships	60,000	Hard (i)	(Japan) Moyuka Uchijima	(Chinese Taipei) Hsieh Yu-chieh (Japan) Minori Yonehara	7–5, 5–7, [10–6]
Loss	6–10	Mar 2020	ITF Yokohama, Japan	25,000	Hard	(Japan) Kanako Morisaki	(Japan) Robu Kajitani (Japan) Naho Sato	6–1, 4–6, [8–10]
Loss	6–11	May 2021	ITF Naples, United States	25,000	Clay	(Japan) Kanako Morisaki	(Norway) Ulrikke Eikeri (United States) Catherine Harrison	2–6, 6–3, [2–10]
Loss	6–12	May 2021	ITF Pelham, United States	25,000	Clay	(Japan) Kanako Morisaki	(Mexico) Fernanda Contreras (Mexico) Marcela Zacarías	0–6, 3–6
Win	7–12	Jun 2021	ITF Santo Domingo, Dominican Republic	25,000	Hard	(Japan) Kanako Morisaki	(United States) Emina Bektas (United States) Quinn Gleason	6–7^{(3)}, 6–1, [10–7]
Win	8–12	Aug 2022	Verbier Open, Switzerland	W25	Clay	(Japan) Kanako Morisaki	(Czech Republic) Michaela Bayerlová (Italy) Nicole Fossa Huergo	6–2, 6–1
Loss	8–13	Oct 2022	ITF Hamamatsu, Japan	W25	Carpet	(Japan) Kanako Morisaki	(Japan) Haruna Arakawa (Japan) Aoi Ito	1–6, 6–7^{(6)}
Win	9–13	Jan 2023	ITF Bhopal, India	W40	Hard	(Japan) Saki Imamura	(Russia) Ekaterina Makarova (Russia) Ekaterina Reyngold	6–3, 7–6^{(3)}
Win	10–13	Mar 2023	Clay Court International, Australia	W60	Clay	(Japan) Yuki Naito	(Australia) Destanee Aiava (Australia) Olivia Gadecki	7–6^{(2)}, 7–5
Loss	10–14	Apr 2023	ITF Fukui, Japan	W15	Hard	(Japan) Kisa Yoshioka	(Chinese Taipei) Li Yu-yun (Japan) Rinon Okuwaki	6–3, 4–6, [8–10]
Loss	10–15	Aug 2023	ITF Aldershot, UK	W25	Hard	(Japan) Saki Imamura	(Australia) Destanee Aiava (United Kingdom) Sarah Beth Grey	4–6, 3–6
Loss	10–16	Mar 2024	ITF Hinode, Japan	W15	Hard	(Japan) Kanako Morisaki	(Japan) Shiori Tominaga (Japan) Hikaru Yoshikawa	3–6, 6–0, [7–10]
Win	11–16	Mar 2024	Kōfu International Open, Japan	W50	Hard	(Japan) Saki Imamura	(India) Rutuja Bhosale (India) Ankita Raina	6–3, 7–5
Loss	11–17	Sep 2024	ITF Perth, Australia	W75	Hard	(Japan) Saki Imamura	(Australia) Talia Gibson (Australia) Maddison Inglis	2–6, 4–6
Loss	11–18	Nov 2024	Gold Coast International, Australia	W75	Hard	(Japan) Kanako Morisaki	(Japan) Hikaru Sato (Japan) Eri Shimizu	7–6^{(0)}, 3–6, [6–10]
