= Eri Shimizu =

Japanese tennis player (born 1998)

Eri Shimizu 清水 映里
- Country (sports): Japan
- Born: 28 May 1998 (age 28) Adachi, Japan
- Plays: Right (two-handed backhand)
- Prize money: US$96,861

Singles
- Career record: 191–134
- Career titles: 1 ITF
- Highest ranking: No. 296 (18 November 2025)
- Current ranking: No. 433 (9 November 2026)

Doubles
- Career record: 110–77
- Career titles: 6 ITF
- Highest ranking: No. 224 (13 October 2025)
- Current ranking: No. 230 (3 November 2025)
- Last updated on: 3 November 2025.

Eri Shimizu (清水 映里, Shimizu Eri; born 28 May 1998) is a Japanese tennis player.

Shimizu has a career-high singles ranking of 296 by the WTA, achieved on 18 November 2024, and a best WTA doubles ranking of 272, set on 28 July 2025.

Shimizu made her WTA Tour main-draw debut at the 2024 Toray Pan Pacific Open, partnering with Japanese Ayano Shimizu in doubles.

== ITF Circuit finals ==
=== Singles: 7 (1 title, 6 runner–ups) ===
Legend W75 tournaments W25/35 tournaments W10/15 tournaments	Finals by surface Hard (1–4) Clay (0–1) Carpet (0–1)

Result	W–L	Date	Tournament	Tier	Surface	Opponent	Score
Loss	0–1	Jun 2018	ITF Gyeongsan, South Korea	W15	Hard	(United States) Hanna Chang	4–6, 2–6
Win	1–1	Feb 2020	ITF Hamilton, New Zealand	W15	Hard	(South Korea) Park So-hyun	6–4, 0–6, 6–3
Loss	1–2	Apr 2021	ITF Cairo, Egypt	W15	Clay	(Russia) Elina Avanesyan	1–6, 0–6
Loss	1–3	Jun 2022	ITF Monastir, Tunisia	W15	Hard	(China) Wei Sijia	3–6, 3–6
Loss	1–4	Jun 2024	ITF Daegu, South Korea	W35	Hard	(South Korea) Back Da-yeon	6–4, 2–6, 3–6
Loss	1–5	Sep 2024	Perth International 2, Australia	W75	Hard	(Australia) Talia Gibson	2–6, 4–6
Loss	1–6	Nov 2025	ITF Hamamatsu, Japan	W35	Carpet	(Japan) Momoko Kobori	2–6, 4–6

=== Doubles: 23 (9 titles, 14 runner-ups) ===
Legend
W100 tournaments
W75 tournaments
W50 tournaments
W25/35 tournaments
W15 tournaments

Result	W–L	Date	Tournament	Tier	Surface	Partner	Opponents	Score
Loss	0–1	Aug 2019	ITF Cancún, Mexico	W15	Hard	(Sweden) Melis Yasar	(Japan) Haine Ogata (Japan) Aiko Yoshitomi	6–0, 2–6, [6–10]
Loss	0–2	Aug 2021	ITF Vejle, Denmark	W15	Clay	(Ukraine) Viktoriia Dema	(Israel) Nicole Khirin (Czech Republic) Darja Viďmanová	6–7^{(7)}, 7–5, [8–10]
Loss	0–3	Oct 2021	ITF Sharm El Sheikh, Egypt	W15	Hard	(Hong Kong) Wu Ho-ching	(Hong Kong) Eudice Chong (Hong Kong) Cody Wong	2–6, 0–6
Loss	0–4	Jun 2022	ITF Monastir, Tunisia	W15	Hard	(Japan) Yuka Hosoki	(China) Wei Sijia (China) Yao Xinxin	3–6, 3–6
Win	1–4	Jul 2022	ITF Monastir, Tunisia	W15	Hard	(Japan) Yuka Hosoki	(Tunisia) Diana Chehoudi (France) Yasmine Mansouri	6–3, 6–2
Loss	1–5	Dec 2022	ITF Monastir, Tunisia	W25	Hard	(United Kingdom) Emilie Lindh	(Greece) Sapfo Sakellaridi (United States) Chiara Scholl	3–6, 3–6
Loss	1–6	Jan 2024	ITF Bangalore, India	W50	Hard	(Chinese Taipei) Li Yu-yun	(Italy) Camilla Rosatello (Latvia) Darja Semeņistaja	6–3, 2–6, [8–10]
Win	2–6	Jun 2024	ITF Taipei, Taiwan	W35	Hard	(Japan) Ikumi Yamazaki	(Japan) Funa Kozaki (Japan) Misaki Matsuda	4–6, 6–1, [10–5]
Loss	2–7	Aug 2024	ITF Roehampton, United Kingdom	W35	Hard	(Japan) Akiko Omae	(Uzbekistan) Nigina Abduraimova (Australia) Lizette Cabrera	2–6, 2–6
Win	3–7	Oct 2024	ITF Makinohara, Japan	W35	Carpet	(Japan) Kanako Morisaki	(South Korea) Jeong Bo-young (Japan) Ayumi Miyamoto	6–2, 6–1
Win	4–7	Nov 2024	Gold Coast Tennis International, Australia	W75	Hard	(Japan) Hikaru Sato	(Japan) Erina Hayashi (Japan) Kanako Morisaki	6–7^{(0)}, 6–3, [10–6]
Loss	4–8	Mar 2025	Kōfu International Open, Japan	W50	Hard	(Japan) Akiko Omae	(Japan) Momoko Kobori (Japan) Ayano Shimizu	1–6, 4–6
Loss	4–9	Mar 2025	ITF Kashiwa, Japan	W15	Hard	(Japan) Kisa Yoshioka	(South Korea) Ku Yeon-woo (Japan) Naho Sato	2–6, 4–6
Win	5–9	Jun 2025	ITF Taipei, Taiwan	W35	Hard	(South Korea) Ku Yeon-woo	(South Korea) Park So-hyun (Japan) Ayano Shimizu	6–4, 2–6, [10–5]
Loss	5–10	Jun 2025	ITF Taipei, Taiwan	W35	Hard	(Chinese Taipei) Li Yu-yun	(South Korea) Park So-hyun (Indonesia) Janice Tjen	1–6, 5–7
Loss	5–11	Jul 2025	ITF Roehampton, United Kingdom	W35	Hard	(Japan) Rinko Matsuda	(United Kingdom) Alicia Dudeney (United Kingdom) Amelia Rajecki	1–6, 4–6
Win	6–11	Sep 2025	ITF Nakhon Pathom, Thailand	W35	Hard	(Japan) Mana Ayukawa	(Japan) Natsumi Kawaguchi (Japan) Erika Sema	6–2, 6–7^{(5)}, [10–8]
Win	7–11	Nov 2025	ITF Hamamatsu, Japan	W35	Carpet	(Japan) Hikaru Sato	(Japan) Mana Ayukawa (Japan) Kanako Morisaki	6–3, 6–2
Loss	7–12	Feb 2026	ITF Pune, India	W75	Hard	(Japan) Misaki Matsuda	(India) Shrivalli Bhamidipaty (India) Ankita Raina	6–7^{(3)}, 3–6
Win	8–12	Feb 2026	ITF Bengaluru Open, India	W100	Hard	(Japan) Misaki Matsuda	(Indonesia) Priska Madelyn Nugroho (India) Ankita Raina	6–4, 3–6, [10–5]
Loss	8–13	Apr 2026	ITF Miyazaki, Japan	W35	Hard	(Japan) Misaki Matsuda	(Japan) Anri Nagata (Japan) Naho Sato	4–6, 6–7^{(2)}
Win	9–13	May 2026	Takasaki Open, Japan	W100	Hard	(Japan) Ayano Shimizu	(Chinese Taipei) Lee Ya-hsin (Hong Kong) Cody Wong	6–1, 6–4
Loss	9–14	Sep 2026	ITF Guiyang, China	W50	Hard	(Japan) Hiroko Kuwata	(China) Guo Meiqi (China) Yang Yidi	6–4, 3–6, [8–10]
