= Ayumi Miyamoto =

Japanese tennis player (born 2000)

Ayumi Miyamoto 宮本 愛弓
- Country (sports): Japan
- Born: 18 December 2000 (age 25) Chiba Prefecture, Japan
- Plays: Right (two-handed backhand)
- Prize money: $49,811

Singles
- Career record: 129–103
- Career titles: 2 ITF
- Highest ranking: No. 525 (27 May 2026)
- Current ranking: No. 776 (12 October 2026)

Doubles
- Career record: 102–47
- Career titles: 12 ITF
- Highest ranking: No. 309 (17 July 2026)
- Current ranking: No. 313 (12 October 2026)

Ayumi Miyamoto (宮本 愛弓, Miyamoto Ayumi; born 18 December 2000) is a Japanese tennis player. She has career-high WTA rankings of No. 525 in singles and 309 in doubles.

Miyamoto won the title at the W50 tournament held in Nanao, Japan, partnering with Kisa Yoshioka.
