= Alicia Smith (tennis) =

Australian tennis player (born 1996)

- Country (sports): Australia
- Born: 27 September 1996 (age 29) Tamworth, Australia
- Plays: Right (two-handed backhand)
- Prize money: $67,062

Singles
- Career record: 136–164
- Career titles: 1 ITF
- Highest ranking: No. 662 (10 August 2020)
- Current ranking: No. 1,070 (31 August 2026)

Doubles
- Career record: 127–140
- Career titles: 5 ITF
- Highest ranking: No. 361 (23 September 2024)
- Current ranking: No. 988 (31 August 2026)

Grand Slam doubles results
- Australian Open: 1R (2017)
- Last updated on: 31 August 2026.

Alicia Smith (born 27 September 1996) is a professional Australian tennis player.

She has career-high WTA rankings of 662 in singles, achieved on 10 August 2020, and 361 in doubles, achieved on 23 September 2024.

Smith made her major main-draw debut, after winning the 2016 Australian Open Women's Doubles Wildcard Playoff, granting her a wildcard into the 2017 Australian Open women's doubles event.

In 2021, Smith won her debut ITF singles title at a $15k event in Solarino, Italy.

== ITF Circuit finals ==
=== Singles: 2 (1 title, 1 runner-up) ===
Legend W35 tournaments W15 tournaments	Finals by surface Hard (0–1) Carpet (1–0)

Result	W–L	Date	Tournament	Tier	Surface	Opponent	Score
Win	1–0	Nov 2021	ITF Solarino, Italy	W15	Carpet	(Italy) Federica Bilardo	6–3, 7–6^{(6)}
Loss	1–1	Jul 2024	ITF Nakhon Si Thammarat, Thailand	W15	Hard	(Thailand) Patcharin Cheapchandej	6–7^{(9)}, 2–6

=== Doubles: 16 (5 titles, 11 runner-ups) ===
Legend W60 tournaments W25/35 tournaments W15 tournaments	Finals by surface Hard (3–8) Grass (2–1) Carpet (0–2)

Result	W–L	Date	Tournament	Tier	Surface	Partner	Opponents	Score
Win	1–0	Dec 2018	ITF Monastir, Tunisia	W15	Hard	(United States) Chiara Scholl	(Italy) Giorgia Marchetti (Italy) Angelica Raggi	6–1, 6–3
Win	2–0	Marc 2019	ITF Mildura, Australia	W25	Grass	(Australia) Alana Parnaby	(Australia) Olivia Rogowska (Australia) Storm Sanders	3–6, 6–3, [10–8]
Loss	2–1	Apr 2019	ITF Cancún, Mexico	W15	Hard	(United States) Madison Westby	(Mexico) Andrea Renée Villarreal (Mexico) Marcela Zacarías	w/o
Loss	2–2	Aug 2019	ITF Tabarka, Tunisia	W15	Clay	(Belgium) Chelsea Vanhoutte	(Netherlands) Merel Hoedt (Australia) Seone Mendez	3–6, 5–7
Loss	2–3	Feb 2020	Launceston International, Australia	W25	Hard	(Papua New Guinea) Abigail Tere-Apisah	(Australia) Alison Bai (Australia) Jaimee Fourlis	6–7^{(4)}, 3–6
Loss	2–4	Nov 2021	ITF Solarino, Italy	W15	Carpet	(Sweden) Jacqueline Cabaj Awad	(Italy) Virginia Ferrara (Italy) Giorgia Pedone	1-6, 6–1, [5–10]
Loss	2–5	Nov 2021	ITF Solarino, Italy	W15	Carpet	(Italy) Melania Delai	(Italy) Federica Urgesi (Italy) Denise Valente	5-7, 7–6^{(4)}, [5–10]
Loss	2–6	Nov 2021	ITF Lousada, Portugal	W15	Hard (i)	(Netherlands) Jasmijn Gimbrère	(Spain) Celia Cerviño Ruiz (Portugal) Matilde Jorge	1–6, 4–6
Loss	2–7	Oct 2022	ITF Wellington, New Zealand	W15	Hard	(Australia) Mia Repac	(Australia) Monique Adamczak (Australia) Sophie McDonald	6–4, 1–6, [6–10]
Win	3–7	Jul 2023	ITF Caloundra, Australia	W15	Hard	(Australia) Stefani Webb	(Japan) Nanari Katsumi (Australia) Zara Larke	6–1, 6–2
Loss	3–8	Oct 2023	ITF Cairns, Australia	W25	Hard	(Australia) Roisin Gilheany	(Australia) Destanee Aiava (Australia) Taylah Preston	6–7^{(5)}, 5–7
Loss	3–9	Nov 2023	Gold Coast International, Australia	W60	Hard	(Australia) Melisa Ercan	(Australia) Roisin Gilheany (Australia) Maya Joint	6–7^{(3)}, 1–6
Win	4–9	Mar 2024	ITF Mildura, Australia	W35	Grass	(Australia) Tahlia Kokkinis	(Thailand) Punnin Kovapitukted (China) Lu Jiajing	5–7, 6–2, [10–7]
Loss	4–10	Jul 2024	ITF Nakhon Si Thammarat, Thailand	W15	Hard	(Australia) Monique Barry	(Thailand) Patcharin Cheapchandej (Thailand) Punnin Kovapitukted	3–6, 1–6
Win	5–10	Jul 2024	ITF Nakhon Si Thammarat, Thailand	W15	Hard	(Australia) Monique Barry	(South Korea) Jeong Bo-young (Thailand) Punnin Kovapitukted	6–4, 6–3
Loss	5–11	Mar 2025	ITF Mildura, Australia	W35	Grass	(Australia) Belle Thompson	(Australia) Lizette Cabrera (Australia) Gabriella Da Silva-Fick	6–2, 3–6, [10–12]
