= Erika Sema =

Japanese tennis player (born 1988)

Erika Sema 瀬間 詠里花
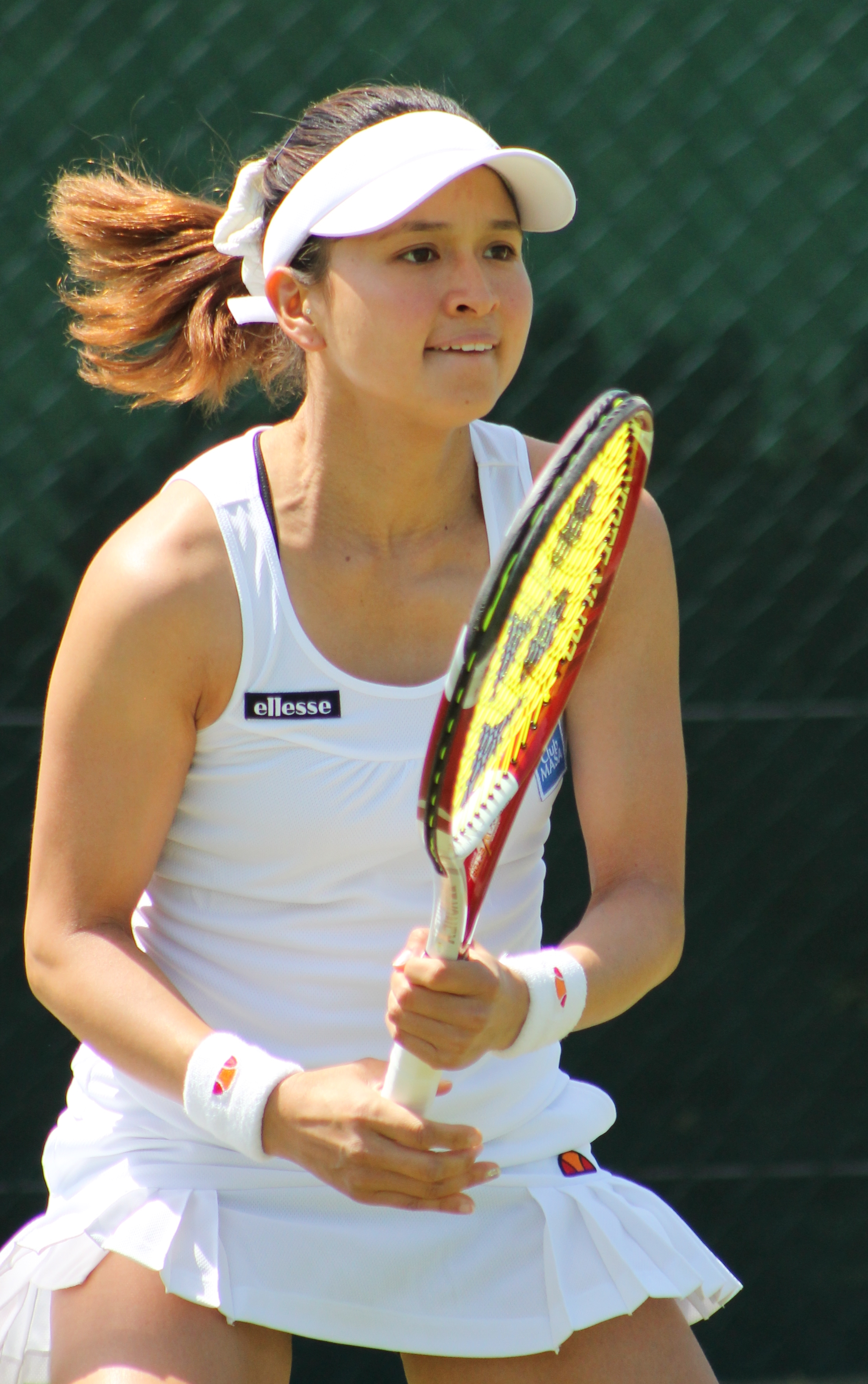
- Sema at the 2014 Wimbledon qualifying
- Country (sports): Japan
- Residence: Tokyo
- Born: November 24, 1988 (age 37) Tokyo
- Height: 1.63 m (5 ft 4 in)
- Plays: Right-handed
- Coach: Shunsuke Ogata
- Prize money: $497,685

Singles
- Career record: 572–505
- Career titles: 11 ITF
- Highest ranking: No. 114 (10 October 2011)
- Current ranking: No. 510 (31 August 2026)

Grand Slam singles results
- Australian Open: Q2 (2011, 2013)
- French Open: Q2 (2012)
- Wimbledon: Q2 (2011, 2012, 2013)
- US Open: Q2 (2013)

Doubles
- Career record: 511–353
- Career titles: 45 ITF
- Highest ranking: No. 120 (28 October 2013)
- Current ranking: No. 344 (31 August 2026)

Grand Slam doubles results
- Wimbledon: Q1 (2012)
- Last updated on: 11 September 2026.

Erika Sema (瀬間 詠里花, Sema Erika; born 24 November 1988) is a Japanese professional tennis player. She reached career-high rankings of 114 in singles and 120 in doubles. In her career, Sema has won 56 titles (45 in doubles) on the ITF Women's World Tennis Tour.

== Biography ==
Erika Sema is the younger sister of Yurika Sema who retired from tennis in November 2015. Her mother is Japanese and her father is French.

Sema, who is playing mostly on the ITF Circuit but also on the WTA Tour, has tried for 16 times to qualify for a Grand Slam tournament, without success.

== ITF Circuit finals ==
=== Singles 17 (11 titles, 6 runner-ups) ===
Legend
$100,000 tournaments
$25,000 tournaments
$10/15,000 tournaments

Result	W–L	Date	Tournament	Tier	Surface	Opponent	Score
Win	1–0	Mar 2007	ITF Hamilton, New Zealand	10,000	Hard	(United Kingdom) Anna Smith	6–3, 7–5
Win	2–0	Jun 2007	ITF Tokyo, Japan	10,000	Hard	(Japan) Chiaki Okadaue	6–3, 2–6, 6–3
Loss	2–1	Mar 2009	Kōfu International Open, Japan	10,000	Hard	(Japan) Misaki Doi	5–7, 2–6
Loss	2–2	May 2009	ITF Balikpapan, Indonesia	25,000	Hard	(Indonesia) Ayu-Fani Damayanti	5–7, 3–6
Win	3–2	Jun 2009	ITF Tokyo, Japan	10,000	Hard	(Japan) Erika Takao	6–4, 6–0
Loss	3–3	Sep 2010	ITF Hamanako, Japan	25,000	Hard	(Japan) Kumiko Iijima	7–6, 2–6, 4–6
Win	4–3	Oct 2010	ITF Port Pirie, Australia	25,000	Hard	(France) Victoria Larrière	6–1, 4–6, 6–4
Win	5–3	Oct 2010	ITF Mount Gambier, Australia	25,000	Hard	(Brazil) Ana Clara Duarte	6–2, 6–3
Win	6–3	Nov 2010	ITF Wellington, New Zealand	25,000	Hard	(Bulgaria) Elitsa Kostova	6–2, 3–6, 6–4
Win	7–3	May 2011	ITF Niigata, Japan	25,000	Hard	(Japan) Sachie Ishizu	7–6, 6–4
Loss	7–4	Sep 2011	Ningbo International, China	100,000	Hard	(Belarus) Anastasiya Yakimova	6–7, 3–6
Loss	7–5	Oct 2011	ITF Makinohara, Japan	25,000	Carpet	(Czech Republic) Karolína Plíšková	7–6, 2–6, 0–6
Win	8–5	Oct 2012	ITF Seoul, Korea	25,000	Hard	(Japan) Mai Minokoshi	6–1, 7–5
Loss	8–6	Sep 2013	ITF Tsukuba, Japan	25,000	Hard	(Japan) Nao Hibino	4–6, 6–7
Win	9–6	Sep 2013	ITF Incheon, Korea	25,000	Hard	(Japan) Yurika Sema	6–3, 6–4
Win	10–6	Jun 2015	ITF Kashiwa, Japan	25,000	Hard	(Japan) Riko Sawayanagi	6–4, 6–4
Win	11–6	Dec 2021	ITF Monastir, Tunisia	15,000	Hard	(Belgium) Eliessa Vanlangendonck	3–6, 6–4, 6–3

=== Doubles: 79 (45 titles, 34 runner-ups) ===
Legend
$100,000 tournaments
$50/60,000 tournaments
$40,000 tournaments
$25,000 tournaments
$10/15,000 tournaments

Result	W–L	Date	Tournament	Tier	Surface	Partner	Opponents	Score
Loss	0–1	Jul 2005	Kurume Cup, Japan	25,000	Grass	(Japan) Ayumi Morita	(Chinese Taipei) Chan Chin-wei (Chinese Taipei) Hsieh Su-wei	4–6, 3–6
Win	1–1	Oct 2007	ITF Traralgon, Australia	25,000	Hard	(Japan) Yurika Sema	(United States) Courtney Nagle (United States) Robin Stephenson	6–2, 6–2
Loss	1–2	May 2008	Kurume Cup, Japan	50,000	Grass	(Japan) Yurika Sema	(Chinese Taipei) Chang Kai-chen (Chinese Taipei) Hwang I-hsuan	3–6, 6–2, [6–10]
Win	2–2	May 2008	ITF Nagano, Japan	25,000	Carpet	(Japan) Yurika Sema	(Japan) Ayaka Maekawa (Japan) Maya Kato	7–6^{(1)}, 6–3
Win	3–2	May 2008	ITF Gunma, Japan	25,000	Carpet	(Japan) Yurika Sema	(Chinese Taipei) Chang Kai-chen (Chinese Taipei) Hwang I-hsuan	6–4, 2–6, [10–7]
Loss	3–3	May 2009	ITF Tarakan, Indonesia	10,000	Hard	(Japan) Yurina Koshino	(Indonesia) Beatrice Gumulya (Indonesia) Jessy Rompies	6–7^{(5)}, 7–6^{(4)}, [7–10]
Loss	3–4	May 2009	ITF Gunma, Japan	25,000	Carpet	(Japan) Yurika Sema	(Chinese Taipei) Hsu Wen-hsin (Japan) Mari Tanaka	3–6, 6–1, [7–10]
Win	4–4	Sep 2009	ITF Makinohara, Japan	25,000	Carpet	(Japan) Kurumi Nara	(Japan) Mari Tanaka (Japan) Tomoko Yonemura	6–0, 6–0
Loss	4–5	Oct 2009	ITF Mount Gambier, Australia	25,000	Hard	(Japan) Yurika Sema	(Australia) Olivia Rogowska (United Kingdom) Emily Webley-Smith	1–6, 7–5, [7–10]
Win	5–5	Oct 2009	ITF Port Pirie, Australia	25,000	Hard	(Japan) Yurika Sema	(Australia) Alenka Hubacek (Australia) Bojana Bobusic	6–1, 7–5, [10–6]
Win	6–5	Apr 2010	ITF Incheon, South Korea	25,000	Hard	(Romania) Irina-Camelia Begu	(Japan) Misaki Doi (Japan) Junri Namigata	6–0, 7–6^{(8)}
Win	7–5	May 2010	Kangaroo Cup Gifu, Japan	50,000	Hard	(Japan) Tomoko Yonemura	(Russia) Ksenia Lykina (United Kingdom) Melanie South	6–3, 2–6, [10–7]
Loss	7–6	Jul 2010	ITF Stuttgart, Germany	25,000	Clay	(Poland) Magdalena Kiszczyńska	(Luxembourg) Mandy Minella (France) Irena Pavlovic	3–6, 4–6
Win	8–6	Jul 2010	ITF Aschaffenburg, Germany	25,000	Clay	(Serbia) Teodora Mirčić	(Romania) Elena Bogdan (Chile) Andrea Koch Benvenuto	7–6^{(4)}, 2–6, [10–8]
Loss	8–7	Jul 2010	ITF Darmstadt, Germany	25,000	Clay	(Romania) Irina-Camelia Begu	(Russia) Vitalia Diatchenko (Germany) Laura Siegemund	6–4, 1–6, [4–10]
Loss	8–8	Aug 2010	Ladies Open Hechingen, Germany	25,000	Clay	(Germany) Julia Schruff	(Romania) Irina-Camelia Begu (France) Anaïs Laurendon	2–6, 6–4, [8–10]
Win	9–8	Aug 2010	Reinert Open Versmold, Germany	25,000	Clay	(Czech Republic) Hana Birnerová	(Russia) Aminat Kushkhova (Russia) Olga Panova	6–3, 6–3
Win	10–8	Sep 2010	ITF Alison Springs, Australia	25,000	Hard	(Japan) Yurika Sema	(Australia) Alison Bai (Australia) Emelyn Starr	7–5, 6–1
Win	11–8	Sep 2010	ITF Hamanako, Japan	25,000	Clay	(Japan) Kumiko Iijima	(Chinese Taipei) Kao Shao-yuan (Japan) Ayaka Maekawa	6–2, 6–1
Loss	11–9	Apr 2011	ITF Osprey, United States	25,000	Clay	(Argentina) María Irigoyen	(France) Stéphanie Foretz (United States) Alexa Glatch	6–4, 5–7, [7–10]
Loss	11–10	Apr 2011	Kangaroo Cup Gifu, Japan	50,000	Hard	(Thailand) Noppawan Lertcheewakarn	(Chinese Taipei) Chan Yung-jan (Chinese Taipei) Chan Hao-ching	2–6, 3–6
Win	12–10	May 2011	ITF Niigata, Japan	25,000	Hard	(Japan) Natsumi Hamamura	(Japan) Akari Inoue (Japan) Ayumi Oka	6–1, 6–2
Win	13–10	Jun 2011	ITF Périgueux, France	25,000	Clay	(Argentina) Florencia Molinero	(Spain) Leticia Costas-Moreira (Spain) Inés Ferrer Suárez	6–2, 3–6, [10–7]
Loss	13–11	Jul 2011	Open de Biarritz, France	100,000	Clay	(Brazil) Roxane Vaisemberg	(Russia) Alexandra Panova (Poland) Urszula Radwańska	2–6, 1–6
Loss	13–12	Jul 2011	Contrexéville Open, France	50,000	Clay	(Brazil) Roxane Vaisemberg	(Ukraine) Valentyna Ivakhnenko (Ukraine) Kateryna Kozlova	6–2, 5–7, [10–12]
Win	14–12	Mar 2012	ITF Sanya, China	25,000	Hard	(China) Zheng Saisai	(China) Liang Chen (China) Zhou Yimiao	6–2, 6–2
Win	15–12	Aug 2012	Bronx Open, United States	50,000	Hard	(Japan) Shuko Aoyama	(Japan) Eri Hozumi (Japan) Miki Miyamura	6–4, 7–6^{(4)}
Win	16–12	Jan 2013	Burnie International, Australia	25,000	Hard	(Japan) Shuko Aoyama	(Australia) Bojana Bobusic (Australia) Jessica Moore	w/o
Win	17–12	Apr 2013	Kangaroo Cup Gifu, Japan	50,000	Hard	(Thailand) Luksika Kumkhum	(Japan) Nao Hibino (Japan) Riko Sawayanagi	6–4, 6–3
Win	18–12	May 2013	Fukuoka International, Japan	50,000	Carpet	(Japan) Junri Namigata	(Japan) Rika Fujiwara (Japan) Akiko Omae	7–5, 3–6, [10–7]
Loss	18–13	Jun 2013	Nottingham Trophy, United Kingdom	50,000	Grass	(Israel) Julia Glushko	(France) Julie Coin (France) Stéphanie Foretz	2–6, 4–6
Win	19–13	Oct 2013	ITF Perth, Australia	25,000	Hard	(Japan) Yurika Sema	(Australia) Monique Adamczak (Australia) Tammi Patterson	7–5, 6–1
Win	20–13	Oct 2013	Bendigo International, Australia	50,000	Hard	(Japan) Yurika Sema	(Australia) Monique Adamczak (Australia) Olivia Rogowska	3–6, 6–2, [11–9]
Loss	20–14	Feb 2014	ITF New Delhi, India	25,000	Hard	(Japan) Yurika Sema	(Thailand) Nicha Lertpitaksinchai (Thailand) Peangtarn Plipuech	6–7, 3–6
Loss	20–15	Mar 2014	ITF Jackson, United States	25,000	Clay	(Japan) Yurika Sema	(South Africa) Chanel Simmonds (Slovenia) Maša Zec Peškirič	7–6, 3–6, [5–10]
Win	21–15	Jul 2015	ITF Bangkok, Thailand	25,000	Hard	(Japan) Akiko Omae	(Japan) Kanae Hisami (Japan) Kotomi Takahata	6–4, 3–6, [11–9]
Loss	21–16	Oct 2016	ITF Makinohara, Japan	25,000	Carpet	(Japan) Rika Fujiwara	(Russia) Ksenia Lykina (Japan) Riko Sawayanagi	4–6, 1–6
Loss	21–17	Feb 2017	ITF Clare, Australia	25,000	Hard	(Australia) Alison Bai	(Brazil) Beatriz Haddad Maia (Australia) Genevieve Lorbergs	4–6, 3–6
Win	22–17	Mar 2017	ITF Yokohama, Japan	25,000	Hard	(Japan) Ayaka Okuno	(Japan) Kanako Morisaki (Japan) Minori Yonehara	6–4, 6–4
Loss	22–18	Mar 2017	ITF Nishitama, Japan	15,000	Hard	(Japan) Shiho Akita	(Japan) Momoko Kobori (Japan) Kotomi Takahata	1–6, 2–6
Loss	22–19	May 2017	Jin'an Open, China	60,000	Hard	(Japan) Mana Ayukawa	(China) Jiang Xinyu (China) Tang Qianhui	5–7, 4–6
Loss	22–20	Sep 2017	ITF Brisbane International, Australia	25,000	Hard	(United States) Jennifer Elie	(Australia) Naiktha Bains (Papua New Guinea) Abigail Tere-Apisah	4–6, 1–6
Loss	22–21	Jan 2018	Playford International, Australia	25,000	Hard	(Japan) Junri Namigata	(Slovenia) Dalila Jakupović (Russia) Irina Khromacheva	6–2, 5–7, [5–10]
Win	23–21	May 2018	ITF Wuhan, China	25,000	Hard	(Japan) Mai Minokoshi	(China) Guo Hanyu (China) Zhang Ying	6–4, 6–1
Loss	23–22	Jul 2018	Challenger de Granby, Canada	60,000	Hard	(Japan) Aiko Yoshitomi	(Australia) Ellen Perez (Australia) Arina Rodionova	5–7, 4–6
Loss	23–23	May 2019	Jin'an Open, China	W60	Hard	(Japan) Mai Minokoshi	(Indonesia) Beatrice Gumulya (China) You Xiaodi	1–6, 5–7
Win	24–23	May 2019	ITF Wuhan, China	W25	Hard	(China) Jiang Xinyu	(China) Guo Meiqi (China) Wu Meixu	7–6^{(3)}, 6–2
Win	25–23	Jul 2019	ITF Qujing, China	W25	Hard	(Japan) Mana Ayukawa	(China) Kang Jiaqi (Thailand) Peangtarn Plipuech	6–2, 6–3
Loss	25–24	Aug 2019	ITF Nonthaburi, Thailand	W25	Hard	(China) Wu Meixu	(Hong Kong) Eudice Chong (Indonesia) Aldila Sutjiadi	2–6, 1–6
Win	26–24	Aug 2019	ITF Tsukuba, Japan	W25	Hard	(Japan) Mana Ayukawa	(Japan) Robu Kajitani (Japan) Michika Ozeki	6–7^{(2)}, 6–1, [10–7]
Loss	26–25	Sep 2019	ITF Changsha, China	W60	Clay	(India) Rutuja Bhosale	(China) Jiang Xinyu (China) Tang Qianhui	3–6, 6–3, [9–11]
Win	27–25	Feb 2020	ITF Perth, Australia	W25	Hard	(Japan) Kanako Morisaki	(Australia) Jaimee Fourlis (New Zealand) Erin Routliffe	7–5, 6–4
Win	28–25	Feb 2020	ITF Perth, Australia	W25	Hard	(Japan) Kanako Morisaki	(New Zealand) Paige Hourigan (Papua New Guinea) Abigail Tere-Apisah	6–1, 4–6, [10–7]
Win	29–25	Feb 2021	ITF Sharm El Sheikh, Egypt	W15	Hard	(Belarus) Shalimar Talbi	(Japan) Miyabi Inoue (Chinese Taipei) Liang En-shuo	2–6, 6–0, [14–12]
Win	30–25	Feb 2021	ITF Sharm El Sheikh	W15	Hard	(Japan) Lisa-Marie Rioux	(Sweden) Kajsa Rinaldo Persson (Sweden) Julita Saner	6–1, 1–6, [10–6]
Win	31–25	Mar 2021	ITF Sharm El Sheikh	W15	Hard	(Czech Republic) Anna Sisková	(Japan) Mana Ayukawa (Japan) Ayano Shimizu	1–6, 6–4, 2–1 ret.
Loss	31–26	May 2021	ITF Monastir, Tunisia	W15	Hard	(United States) Emma Davis	(Netherlands) Eva Vedder (Netherlands) Stéphanie Visscher	0–6, 4–6
Loss	31–27	May 2021	ITF Monastir, Tunisia	W15	Hard	(Italy) Angelica Raggi	(United States) Lauren Proctor (United States) Anna Ulyashchenko	6–4, 6–7^{(5)}, [7–10]
Win	32–27	Aug 2021	ITF Oldenzaal, Netherlands	W25	Clay	(Japan) Kanako Morisaki	(Netherlands) Eva Vedder (Netherlands) Stéphanie Visscher	5–7, 6–3, [10–7]
Loss	32–28	Sep 2021	ITF Prague Open, Czech Republic	W60	Clay	(Japan) Kanako Morisaki	(Czech Republic) Miriam Kolodziejová (Czech Republic) Jesika Malečková	3–6, 6–1, [2–10]
Win	33–28	Sep 2021	ITF Frýdek-Místek, Czech Republic	W25	Clay	(Japan) Kanako Morisaki	(Czech Republic) Miriam Kolodziejová (Czech Republic) Anna Sisková	6–3, 6–1
Win	34–28	May 2022	ITF Monastir, Tunisia	W25	Hard	(China) Liu Fangzhou	(Uzbekistan) Nigina Abduraimova (Russia) Aleksandra Pospelova	6–3, 6–2
Win	35–28	Jun 2022	ITF Chiang Rai, Thailand	W25	Hard	(India) Rutuja Bhosale	(Japan) Haruna Arakawa (Japan) Natsuho Arakawa	6–1, 6–3
Win	36–28	Aug 2022	ITF Roehampton, United Kingdom	W25	Hard	(India) Rutuja Bhosale	(United Kingdom) Naiktha Bains (United Kingdom) Maia Lumsden	4–6, 6–3, [11–9]
Win	37-28	Oct 2022	ITF Hua Hin, Thailand	W25	Hard	(Thailand) Peangtarn Plipuech	(Kazakhstan) Gozal Ainitdinova; Ekaterina Maklakova	2–6, 7–6^{(0)}, [13–11]
Win	38-28	Jul 2023	ITF Hong Kong, China SAR	W25	Hard	(Japan) Aoi Ito	(Japan) Momoko Kobori (Japan) Ayano Shimizu	5–7, 6–3, [10–4]
Win	39–28	Jul 2023	ITF Nakhon, Thailand	W25	Hard	(India) Rutuja Bhosale	(India) Shrivalli Bhamidipaty (India) Vaidehi Chaudhari	7–6^{(3)}, 6–1
Win	40–28	Aug 2023	ITF Astana, Kazakhstan	W25	Hard	(Japan) Haruna Arakawa	(India) Shrivalli Bhamidipaty (India) Vaidehi Chaudhari	6–7^{(6)}, 6–3, [10–5]
Loss	40–29	Aug 2023	ITF Hong Kong	W40	Hard	(Japan) Aoi Ito	(Japan) Momoko Kobori (Japan) Ayano Shimizu	6–3, 3–6, [9–11]
Win	41–29	Sep 2023	ITF Nanao, Japan	W40	Carpet	(Japan) Aoi Ito	(Japan) Miho Kuramochi (Japan) Kanako Morisaki	6–2, 7–5
Win	42–29	Jun 2024	ITF Changwon, Korea	W35	Hard	(New Zealand) Paige Hourigan	(China) Li Zongyu (China) Shi Han	6–4, 4–6, [10–4]
Win	43–29	Aug 2024	ITF Erwitte, Germany	W35	Hard	(Germany) Fabienne Gettwart	(Slovenia) Kristina Novak (Sweden) Lisa Zaar	6–4, 6–4
Win	44–29	Aug 2024	ITF Braunschweig, Germany	W35	Hard	(Japan) Funa Kozaki	(France) Sarah Iliev (Japan) Ikumi Yamazaki	3–6, 6–7^{(9)}
Loss	44–30	Feb 2025	Launceston Tennis International, Australia	W35	Hard	(Japan) Miho Kuramochi	(New Zealand) Monique Barry (Australia) Elena Micic	2–6, 4–6
Loss	44–31	Sep 2025	ITF Nakhon Pathom, Thailand	W35	Hard	(Japan) Natsumi Kawaguchi	(Japan) Mana Ayukawa (Japan) Eri Shimizu	2–6, 7–6^{(5)}, [8–10]
Loss	44–32	Sep 2025	ITF Wagga Wagga, Australia	W35	Hard	(Australia) Elyse Tse	(Japan) Hayu Kinoshita (Chinese Taipei) Yang Ya-yi	1–6, 6–3, [8–10]
Win	45–32	Dec 2025	ITF Monastir, Tunisia	W15	Hard	(Japan) Yuno Kitahara	(Romania) Maria Toma (France) Marie Villet	6–1, 6–3
Loss	45–33	Apr 2026	ITF Singapore	W15	Hard (i)	(Chinese Taipei) Tsao Chia-yi	(Japan) Rinko Matsuda (Luxembourg) Marie Weckerle	6–7^{(6)}, 2–6
Loss	45–34	Apr 2026	ITF Singapore	W15	Hard (i)	(Chinese Taipei) Tsao Chia-yi	(Chinese Taipei) Lin Fang-an (South Korea) Shin Ji-ho	6–7^{(1)}, 7–5, [5–10]
