= Hikaru Sato (tennis) =

Japanese tennis player (born 1999)

Hikaru Sato 佐藤 光
- Country (sports): Japan
- Born: 5 April 1999 (age 27) Tokyo, Japan
- Plays: Right (two-handed backhand)
- Prize money: $85,699

Singles
- Career record: 167–104
- Career titles: 3 ITF
- Highest ranking: No. 337 (7 October 2024)
- Current ranking: No. 353 (19 November 2026)

Doubles
- Career record: 115–82
- Career titles: 12 ITF
- Highest ranking: No. 221 (9 November 2025)
- Current ranking: No. 221 (9 November 2026)
- Last updated on: 15 November 2026.

Hikaru Sato (佐藤 光, Satō Hikaru; born 5 April 1999) is a Japanese tennis player. She has won three singles titles and twelve doubles titles on the ITF Women's World Tennis Tour.

== College ==
Sato was accepted to Washington State University in Washington State on a full scholarship. She played for the Washington State Cougars women's tennis team from 2018 to 2020. She transferred to the University of Washington in 2021. She played for the Washington Huskies women's tennis team until 2023.

== Career ==
=== Professional ===
In December 2023, she became the champion in doubles with her partner Mio Mushika at the W25 tournament in Papamoa, New Zealand. They defeated Czech Michaela Bayerlová and Australian Alana Parnaby in the final.

In July 2024, she won her first singles title at a tournament in Nakhon Si Thammarat, Thailand. In September 2024, she won her second singles title at the W35 Nakhon Si Thammarat event. In doubles, she and her partner Kanako Morisaki became champions in two consecutive weeks.

In November 2024, she won her first major ITF doubles title with partner Eri Shimizu at the W75 Gold Coast International. They defeated fellow Japanese Erina Hayashi and Kanako Morisaki in the final.

== ITF Circuit finals ==
=== Singles: 5 (3 titles, 2 runner-ups) ===
Legend W35 tournaments W15 tournaments	Finals by surface Hard (3–2)

Result	W–L	Date	Tournament	Tier	Surface	Opponent	Score
Win	1–0	Jul 2024	ITF Nakhon Si Thammarat, Thailand	W15	Hard	(Japan) Ayumi Koshiishi	6–4, 6–4
Win	2–0	Sep 2024	ITF Nakhon Si Thammarat	W35	Hard	Mariia Tkacheva	4–6, 6–3, 6–2
Loss	2–1	Jun 2026	ITF Tokyo, Japan	W15	Hard	(Japan) Ikumi Yamazaki	6–7^{(4)}, 6–2, 2–6
Win	3–1	Oct 2026	ITF Sydney, Australia	W35	Hard	(Chinese Taipei) Wan I-wen	2–6, 6–3, 6–4
Loss	3–2	Oct 2026	ITF Sydney, Australia	W35	Hard	(United Kingdom) Katie Swan	1–6, 2–6

=== Doubles: 17 (12 titles, 5 runner-ups) ===
Legend W100 tournaments W75 tournaments W25/35 tournaments W15 tournaments	Finals by surface Hard (7–4) Clay (2–1) Carpet (3–0)

Result	W–L	Date	Tournament	Tier	Surface	Partner	Opponents	Score
Win	1–0	Jul 2022	ITF Cancún, Mexico	W15	Hard	(Canada) Vanessa Wong	(Argentina) Alicia Herrero Liñana (Argentina) Melany Krywoj	6–2, 6–4
Win	2–0	Dec 2023	ITF Papamoa, New Zealand	W25	Hard	(Japan) Mio Mushika	(Czech Republic) Michaela Bayerlová (Australia) Alana Parnaby	6–4, 5–7, [10–8]
Loss	2–1	Apr 2024	ITF Nottingham, United; Kingdom	W35	Hard	(Japan) Akiko Omae	(Austria) Tamira Paszek (Switzerland) Valentina Ryser	2–6, 7–5, [5–10]
Win	3–1	Aug 2024	ITF Nakhon Si Thammarat, Thailand	W35	Hard	(Japan) Kanako Morisaki	(Japan) Natsumi Kawaguchi (Japan) Momoko Kobori	6–2, 6–3
Win	4–1	Sep 2024	ITF Nakhon Si Thammarat	W35	Hard	(Japan) Kanako Morisaki	(India) Shrivalli Bhamidipaty (India) Vaidehi Chaudhari	6–3, 2–6, [10–8]
Win	5–1	Nov 2024	Gold Coast International, Australia	W75	Hard	(Japan) Eri Shimizu	(Japan) Erina Hayashi (Japan) Kanako Morisaki	6–7^{(0)}, 6–3, [10–6]
Win	6–1	Mar 2025	ITF Solarino, Italy	W35	Carpet	(Japan) Hiromi Abe	(Spain) Celia Cerviño Ruiz (Spain) Lucía Cortez Llorca	6–2, 6–3
Win	7–1	Mar 2025	ITF Santa Margherita di Pula, Italy	W35	Clay	(Japan) Ikumi Yamazaki	(Italy) Jessica Pieri (Italy) Tatiana Pieri	7–5, 2–6, [10–4]
Win	8–1	Apr 2025	ITF Santa Margherita di Pula	W35	Clay	(Japan) Ikumi Yamazaki	(Germany) Katharina Hobgarski (Germany) Antonia Schmidt	7–6^{(4)}, 1–6, [12–10]
Loss	8–2	Apr 2025	ITF Santa Margherita di Pula	W35	Clay	(Norway) Astrid Brune Olsen	(Netherlands) Jasmijn Gimbrère (Netherlands) Stéphanie Visscher	4–6, 2–6
Loss	8–3	Aug 2025	ITF Singapore, Singapore	W15	Hard (i)	(Japan) Yuka Hosoki	(South Korea) Im Heerae (South Korea) Cherry Kim	6–2, 4–6, [1–10]
Win	9–3	Nov 2025	ITF Hamamatsu, Japan	W35	Carpet	(Japan) Eri Shimizu	(Japan) Mana Ayukawa (Japan) Kanako Morisaki	6–3, 6–2
Win	10–3	May 2026	Fukuoka International, Japan	W35	Carpet	(Japan) Ayumi Miyamoto	(Japan) Mayuka Aikawa (Japan) Natsuki Yoshimoto	6–1, 6–4
Win	11–3	May 2026	ITF Wuning, China	W35	Hard	(New Zealand) Monique Barry	(China) Wang Meiling (China) Ye Qiuyu	7–6^{(3)}, 6–4
Win	12–3	Oct 2026	ITF Sydney, Australia	W35	Hard	(New Zealand) Monique Barry	(Australia) Amy Stevens (Australia) Belle Thompson	6–3, 5–7, [10–8]
Loss	12–4	Oct 2026	ITF Sydney, Australia	W35	Hard	(Australia) Elyse Tse	(South Korea) Back Da-yeon (Japan) Ikumi Yamazaki	6–2, 4–6, [5–10]
Loss	12–5	Nov 2026	Incheon Open, South Korea	W100	Hard	(Japan) Natsumi Kawaguchi	Ekaterina Ovcharenko; Valeria Savinykh	5–7, 6–1, [11–13]
