= Kisa Yoshioka =

Japanese tennis player (born 2000)

Kisa Yoshioka 吉岡 希紗
- Country (sports): Japan
- Born: 2 September 2000 (age 26) Susono, Japan
- Plays: Left (two-handed backhand)
- Prize money: $44,401

Singles
- Career record: 114–104
- Career titles: 1 ITF
- Highest ranking: No. 600 (21 September 2026)
- Current ranking: No. 607 (12 October 2026)

Doubles
- Career record: 120–67
- Career titles: 11 ITF
- Highest ranking: No. 300 (12 October 2026)
- Current ranking: No. 300 (12 October 2026)

Kisa Yoshioka (吉岡 希紗, Yoshioka Kisa; born 2 September 2000) is a Japanese tennis player. She has career-high WTA rankings of No. 600 in singles and 300 in doubles.

Yoshioka won the title at the W50 tournament held in Nanao, Japan, partnering with Ayumi Miyamoto.
