= 2024 Perth Tennis International 2 – Singles =

Singles
- 2024 Perth Tennis International 2

Final
- Champion: (Australia) Talia Gibson
- Runner-up: (Japan) Eri Shimizu
- Score: 6–2, 6–4

Events
Singles	Doubles
← 2023 ·	Perth Tennis International	· 2025 →

Taylah Preston was the defending champion but chose to compete in Hua Hin instead.

Talia Gibson won the title, defeating Eri Shimizu in the final, 6–2, 6–4.

== Seeds ==
1. (Australia) Talia Gibson (champion)
2. (Australia) Destanee Aiava (first round)
3. (Japan) Aoi Ito (second round)
4. (Australia) Maddison Inglis (semifinals)
5. (Japan) Sayaka Ishii (first round)
6. (India) Ankita Raina (quarterfinals)
7. (Japan) Ayano Shimizu (first round)
8. (Australia) Melisa Ercan (second round)

== Draw ==
=== Key ===
- Q = Qualifier
- WC = Wild card
- LL = Lucky loser
- Alt = Alternate
- SE = Special exempt
- PR = Protected ranking
- ITF = ITF entry
- JE = Junior exempt
- w/o = Walkover
- r = Retired
- d = Defaulted
- SR = Special ranking

=== Finals ===
Semifinals
1	(Australia) Talia Gibson	7^{9}	4	6
4	(Australia) Maddison Inglis	6^{7}	6	4
(Japan) Eri Shimizu	7	6
Q	(Australia) Elena Micic	5	3

Final
1	(Australia) Talia Gibson	6	6
(Japan) Eri Shimizu	2	4

=== Top half ===
First round
1	(Australia) T Gibson	6	6
(Japan) N Sato	0	3
Q	(Japan) A Koshiishi	4	6	6
(Japan) S Hosogi	6	2	4
WC	(Australia) A Parnaby	1	6	6
Q	(Australia) A Osborne	6	4	3
(Australia) P Hule	6	4	7^{8}
5	(Japan) S Ishii	3	6	6^{6}
4	(Australia) M Inglis	6	6
Q	(Japan) M Aikawa	1	3
WC	(Australia) S Webb	2	0
(Japan) S Imamura	6	6
WC	(Australia) A Bozovic	3	0
(India) S Bhamidipaty	6	6
(Japan) H Arakawa	6^{4}	4
8	(Australia) M Ercan	7^{7}	6

Second round
1	(Australia) T Gibson	6	3	6
Q	(Japan) A Koshiishi	1	6	2
WC	(Australia) A Parnaby	6	3	1
(Australia) P Hule	3	6	6
4	(Australia) M Inglis	3	7	6
(Japan) S Imamura	6	5	3
(India) S Bhamidipaty	6	6
8	(Australia) M Ercan	1	1

Quarterfinals
1	(Australia) T Gibson	6	7^{7}
(Australia) P Hule	2	6^{5}
4	(Australia) M Inglis	3	6	7^{7}
(India) S Bhamidipaty	6	4	6^{5}

Semifinals
1	(Australia) T Gibson	7^{9}	4	6
4	(Australia) M Inglis	6^{7}	6	4

=== Bottom half ===
First round
6	(India) A Raina	6	6
(Japan) M Kuramochi	0	4
Q	(United Kingdom) N Bains	6	6^{7}	6
(Japan) H Sato	4	7^{9}	2
Q	(Japan) N Hanatani	1	2
(Japan) E Shimizu	6	6
(Australia) G Da Silva-Fick	5	2
3	(Japan) A Ito	7	6
7	(Japan) A Shimizu	3	1
Q	(Australia) E Micic	6	6
Q	(Japan) C Muramatsu	6	4	0
(Japan) E Sema	3	6	6
Q	(Slovakia) V Morvayová	3	3
(Australia) L Cabrera	6	6
(Japan) M Matsuda	6	6
2	(Australia) D Aiava	4	4

Second round
6	(India) A Raina	6	6
Q	(United Kingdom) N Bains	2	4
(Japan) E Shimizu	1	6	7^{7}
3	(Japan) A Ito	6	3	6^{2}
Q	(Australia) E Micic	6	6
(Japan) E Sema	2	0
(Australia) L Cabrera	6^{8}	6^{4}
(Japan) M Matsuda	7^{10}	7^{7}

Quarterfinals
6	(India) A Raina	5	4
(Japan) E Shimizu	7	6
Q	(Australia) E Micic	6	7^{11}
(Japan) M Matsuda	1	6^{9}

Semifinals
(Japan) E Shimizu	7	6
Q	(Australia) E Micic	5	3
