= 2025 NSW Open =

- Date: 17–23 November
- Edition: 5th (men); 11th (women)
- Category: ATP Challenger Tour; ITF Women's World Tennis Tour
- Surface: Hard / Outdoor
- Location: Sydney, Australia

Champions

Men's singles
- (Australia) James Duckworth

Women's singles
- (Australia) Talia Gibson

Men's doubles
- (Australia) Rinky Hijikata / (Australia) Marc Polmans

Women's doubles
- (Japan) Hiromi Abe / (Japan) Ikumi Yamazaki
- NSW Open

The 2025 Perpetual NSW Open, was a combined men's and women's tennis tournament played on outdoor hard courts. It was the fifth edition of the tournament which was part of the 2025 ATP Challenger Tour and the eleventh edition of the tournament which was part of the 2025 ITF Women's World Tennis Tour. It took place in Sydney, Australia between 17 and 23 November 2025.

== Champions ==
=== Men's singles ===
- (Australia) James Duckworth def. (Japan) Hayato Matsuoka 6–1, 6–4.

=== Women's singles ===
- (Australia) Talia Gibson def. (Australia) Emerson Jones 6–2, 6–4.

=== Men's doubles ===
- (Australia) Rinky Hijikata / (Australia) Marc Polmans def. (Australia) Calum Puttergill / (Australia) Dane Sweeny 6–0, 6–4.

=== Women's doubles ===
- (Japan) Hiromi Abe / (Japan) Ikumi Yamazaki def. (Australia) Petra Hule / (Australia) Elena Micic 6–4, 6–4

== Men's singles main draw entrants ==
=== Seeds ===
Country	Player	Rank^{1}	Seed
AUS	James Duckworth	106	1
AUS	Rinky Hijikata	127	2
AUS	Bernard Tomic	186	3
AUS	Jason Kubler	190	4
AUS	James McCabe	192	5
AUS	Dane Sweeny	231	6
AUS	Alex Bolt	238	7
JPN	Rio Noguchi	240	8

- ^{1} Rankings are as of 10 November 2025.

=== Other entrants ===
The following players received wildcards into the singles main draw:

- (Australia) Cruz Hewitt
- (Australia) Hayden Jones
- (Australia) Tai Sach

The following player received entry into the singles main draw as a special exempt:

- (Chinese Taipei) Wu Tung-lin

The following player received entry into the singles main draw through the Junior Accelerator programme:

- (Netherlands) ~~Mees Röttgering~~

The following player received entry into the singles main draw as an alternate:

- (Japan) Takuya Kumasaka

The following players received entry from the qualifying draw:

- (Australia) Jake Delaney
- (Japan) Shinji Hazawa
- (United Kingdom) Emile Hudd
- (Japan) Hayato Matsuoka
- (Denmark) Carl Emil Overbeck
- (Australia) Marc Polmans

The following players received entry as lucky losers:

- (Jamaica) Blaise Bicknell
- (Australia) Pavle Marinkov

== Women's singles main draw entrants ==
=== Seeds ===
Country	Player	Rank^{1}	Seed
AUS	Kimberly Birrell	95	1
UKR	Yuliia Starodubtseva	116	2
AUS	Talia Gibson	136	3
AUS	Maddison Inglis	175	4
AUS	Emerson Jones	189	5
AUS	Destanee Aiava	212	6
AUS	Taylah Preston	219	7
CHN	Wei Sijia	223	8

- ^{1} Rankings are as of 10 November 2025.

=== Other entrants ===
The following players received wildcards into the singles main draw:

- (Australia) Gabriella Da Silva-Fick
- (Australia) Storm Hunter
- (Australia) Tahlia Kokkinis
- (Australia) Alana Subasic

The following players received entry from the qualifying draw:

- (New Zealand) Monique Barry
- (South Korea) Jang Su-jeong
- (South Korea) Jeong Bo-young
- (Australia) Laquisa Khan
- (Japan) Naho Sato
- (Australia) Belle Thompson
- (China) Tian Fangran
- (Chinese Taipei) Yang Ya-yi
