= 2025 NSW Open – Women's singles =

Women's singles
- 2025 NSW Open

Final
- Champion: (Australia) Talia Gibson
- Runner-up: (Australia) Emerson Jones
- Score: 6–2, 6–4

Events
Singles	men	women
Doubles	men	women
- NSW Open

Talia Gibson won the title, defeating defending champion Emerson Jones in the final, 6–2, 6–4.

== Seeds ==
1. (Australia) Kimberly Birrell (semifinals)
2. (Ukraine) Yuliia Starodubtseva (first round)
3. (Australia) Talia Gibson (champion)
4. (Australia) Maddison Inglis (second round)
5. (Australia) Emerson Jones (final)
6. (Australia) Destanee Aiava (first round, retired)
7. (Australia) Taylah Preston (second round)
8. (China) Wei Sijia (second round)

== Draw ==
Key

- Q = Qualifier
- WC = Wild card
- LL = Lucky loser
- Alt = Alternate
- ITF = ITF entry
- PR = Protected ranking
- SR = Special ranking
- SE = Special exempt
- JE = Junior exempt
- JR = Junior Accelerator Programme entrant
- CO = College Accelerator Programme entrant
- NG = Next Gen Accelerator Program entrant
- w/o = Walkover
- r = Retired
- d = Defaulted

=== Finals ===
Semifinals
1	(Australia) Kimberly Birrell	4	6	3
3	(Australia) Talia Gibson	6	3	6
WC	(Australia) Storm Hunter	3	1
5	(Australia) Emerson Jones	6	6

Final
3	(Australia) Talia Gibson	6	6
5	(Australia) Emerson Jones	2	4

=== Top half ===
First round
1	(Australia) K Birrell	7	6
(United States) L Ma	5	2
(Japan) M Kuramochi	6^{5}	6	6
Q	(South Korea) S-j Jang	7^{7}	0	1
(Ukraine) K Zavatska	4	5
Q	(Chinese Taipei) Y-y Yang	6	7
WC	(Australia) T Kokkinis	2	5
7	(Australia) T Preston	6	7
3	(Australia) T Gibson	6	6
Q	(Australia) B Thompson	2	0
Q	(Australia) L Khan	4	2
(South Korea) D-y Back	6	6
Q	(Japan) N Sato	2	5
(Japan) M Yamaguchi	6	7
WC	(Australia) G Da Silva-Fick	2
6	(Australia) D Aiava	1^{r}

Second round
1	(Australia) K Birrell	7^{7}	6
(Japan) M Kuramochi	6^{5}	1
Q	(Chinese Taipei) Y-y Yang	2	6	6
7	(Australia) T Preston	6	2	4
3	(Australia) T Gibson	6	6
(South Korea) D-y Back	3	2
(Japan) M Yamaguchi	6	2	6
WC	(Australia) G Da Silva-Fick	2	6	3

Quarterfinals
1	(Australia) K Birrell	6	6
Q	(Chinese Taipei) Y-y Yang	3	2
3	(Australia) T Gibson	3	7^{7}	6
(Japan) M Yamaguchi	6	6^{4}	2

Semifinals
1	(Australia) K Birrell	4	6	3
3	(Australia) T Gibson	6	3	6

=== Bottom half ===
First round
8	(China) S Wei	6	6
Q	(South Korea) B-y Jeong	2	3
Q	(China) F Tian	6	2	6
Q	(New Zealand) M Barry	0	6	4
(Japan) I Yamazaki	2	4
WC	(Australia) S Hunter	6	6
(Japan) H Abe	4	3
4	(Australia) M Inglis	6	6
5	(Australia) E Jones	6	6
(Japan) S Imamura	2	4
(South Korea) E-h Lee	4
(United Kingdom) K Swan	5^{r}
WC	(Australia) A Subasic	5	3
(Australia) E Micic	7	6
(Australia) L Cabrera	6	7
2	(Ukraine) Y Starodubtseva	2	5

Second round
8	(China) S Wei	1	2
Q	(China) F Tian	6	6
WC	(Australia) S Hunter	6	2	7^{8}
4	(Australia) M Inglis	3	6	6^{6}
5	(Australia) E Jones	6	7
(South Korea) E-h Lee	2	5
(Australia) E Micic	6	7^{7}
(Australia) L Cabrera	4	6^{4}

Quarterfinals
Q	(China) F Tian	5	4
WC	(Australia) S Hunter	7	6
5	(Australia) E Jones	7^{8}	6
(Australia) E Micic	6^{6}	2

Semifinals
WC	(Australia) S Hunter	3	1
5	(Australia) E Jones	6	6
