= 2026 City of Playford Tennis International =

- Date: 23–29 November
- Edition: 8th
- Category: ATP Challenger Tour; ITF Women's World Tennis Tour
- Surface: Hard / Outdoor
- Location: City of Playford, Australia

2025 Champions

Men's singles
- (Australia) Rinky Hijikata

Women's singles
- (Australia) Emerson Jones

Men's doubles
- (Australia) Jake Delaney / (Australia) Li Tu

Women's doubles
- (Australia) Talia Gibson / (Australia) Maddison Inglis
- City of Playford Tennis International

The 2026 City of Playford Tennis International was a professional tennis tournament played on outdoor hard courts. It was the eighth edition of the tournament which was part of the 2026 ATP Challenger Tour and the 2026 ITF Women's World Tennis Tour. It took place in the City of Playford, Australia between 23 and 29 November 2026.

== Champions ==
=== Men's singles ===
- vs.

=== Women's singles ===
- vs.

=== Men's doubles ===
- / vs. /

=== Women's doubles ===
- / vs. /

== Men's singles main draw entrants ==
=== Seeds ===
| Country | Player | Rank^{1} | Seed |
|---|---|---|---|
| AUS | Dane Sweeny | 122 | 1 |
| AUS | Tristan Schoolkate | 145 | 2 |
| DEN | August Holmgren | 198 | 3 |
| AUS | Alex Bolt | 209 | 4 |
| AUS | Matthew Dellavedova | 227 | 5 |
| AUS | Omar Jasika | 294 | 6 |
| GER | Florian Broska | 316 | 7 |
| DEN | Carl Emil Overbeck | 324 | 8 |

- ^{1} Rankings are as of 16 November 2026.

=== Other entrants ===
The following players received wildcards into the singles main draw:

- (Australia) Hayden Jones
- (Australia) Daniel Jovanovski
- (Australia) Derek Pham

The following player received entry into the singles main draw as an alternate:

- (New Zealand) Isaac Becroft

The following players received entry from the qualifying draw:

- (Australia)
- (Australia)
- (Australia)
