= 2025 City of Playford Tennis International – Women's doubles =

Women's doubles
- 2025 City of Playford Tennis International

Final
- Champions: (Australia) Talia Gibson (Australia) Maddison Inglis
- Runners-up: (South Korea) Back Da-yeon (South Korea) Lee Eun-hye
- Score: 6–2, 6–0

Events
Singles	men	women
Doubles	men	women
← 2024 ·	City of Playford Tennis International	· 2026 →

Talia Gibson and Maddison Inglis won the title, defeating Back Da-yeon and Lee Eun-hye in the final; 6–2, 6–0.

Alexandra Bozovic and Petra Hule were the defending champions but Bozovic chose not to participate. Hule partnered Elena Micic, but lost in the semifinals to Back and Lee.

== Seeds ==
1. (Australia) Petra Hule / (Australia) Elena Micic (semifinals)
2. (Australia) Gabriella Da Silva-Fick / (Australia) Alexandra Osborne (first round)
3. (South Korea) Back Da-yeon / (South Korea) Lee Eun-hye (final)
4. (Australia) Talia Gibson / (Australia) Maddison Inglis (champions)

== Draw ==
Key

- Q = Qualifier
- WC = Wild card
- LL = Lucky loser
- Alt = Alternate
- ITF = ITF entry
- PR = Protected ranking
- SR = Special ranking
- SE = Special exempt
- JE = Junior exempt
- JR = Junior Accelerator Programme entrant
- CO = College Accelerator Programme entrant
- NG = Next Gen Accelerator Program entrant
- w/o = Walkover
- r = Retired
- d = Defaulted

First round
(Australia) J Adams (Australia) D Badalyan	3	3
A Bulatova (South Korea) B-y Jeong	6	6
3	(South Korea) D-y Back (South Korea) E-h Lee	2	6	[10]
(South Korea) G-e Jang (Australia) E Kim	6	2	[5]
(Australia) Ri Alame (Australia) A-M Sycamore	3	6	[10]
(Australia) S Rokusek (Japan) H Satō	6	4	[7]
(Chinese Taipei) Y-y Yang (China) C Yuan	6	6
(Australia) C Korhonen (Australia) S Mickoska	3	2
(Australia) C Baker (Australia) K Tscharke	0	0
4	(Australia) T Gibson (Australia) M Inglis	6	6
(Australia) A Subasic (Australia) B Thompson	7	1	[10]
(New Zealand) M Barry (New Zealand) V Ivanov	5	6	[8]
(China) S Wei (Japan) I Yamazaki	6	6
2	(Australia) G Da Silva-Fick (Australia) A Osborne	4	4

Quarterfinals
1	(Australia) P Hule (Australia) E Micic	6	6
A Bulatova (South Korea) B-y Jeong	2	1
3	(South Korea) D-y Back (South Korea) E-h Lee	6	6
(Australia) Ri Alame (Australia) A-M Sycamore	0	1
(Chinese Taipei) Y-y Yang (China) C Yuan	4	2
4	(Australia) T Gibson (Australia) M Inglis	6	6
(Australia) A Subasic (Australia) B Thompson	4	4
(China) S Wei (Japan) I Yamazaki	6	6

Semifinals
1	(Australia) P Hule (Australia) E Micic	4	4
3	(South Korea) D-y Back (South Korea) E-h Lee	6	6
4	(Australia) T Gibson (Australia) M Inglis	6	6
(China) S Wei (Japan) I Yamazaki	4	2

Final
3	(South Korea) D-y Back (South Korea) E-h Lee	2	0
4	(Australia) T Gibson (Australia) M Inglis	6	6
