= 2025 City of Playford Tennis International – Women's singles =

Women's singles
- 2025 City of Playford Tennis International

Final
- Champion: (Australia) Emerson Jones
- Runner-up: (Australia) Maddison Inglis
- Score: 6–4, 6–4

Events
| Singles | men | women |
| Doubles | men | women |
| ← 2024 · | City of Playford Tennis International | · 2026 → |

Emerson Jones won the title, defeating defending champion Maddison Inglis in the final, 6–4, 6–4.

== Seeds ==
1. (Ukraine) Yuliia Starodubtseva (quarterfinals)
2. (Australia) Talia Gibson (semifinals)
3. (Australia) Emerson Jones (champion)
4. (Australia) Maddison Inglis (final)
5. (China) Wei Sijia (quarterfinals)
6. (Australia) Taylah Preston (semifinals)
7. (Australia) Destanee Aiava (first round)
8. (Australia) Lizette Cabrera (first round)

== Draw ==
Key

- Q = Qualifier
- WC = Wild card
- LL = Lucky loser
- Alt = Alternate
- ITF = ITF entry
- PR = Protected ranking
- SR = Special ranking
- SE = Special exempt
- JE = Junior exempt
- JR = Junior Accelerator Programme entrant
- CO = College Accelerator Programme entrant
- NG = Next Gen Accelerator Program entrant
- w/o = Walkover
- r = Retired
- d = Defaulted

=== Finals ===
Semifinals
6 | (Australia) Taylah Preston | 5 | 1
4 | (Australia) Maddison Inglis | 7 | 6
3 | (Australia) Emerson Jones | 6 | 6
2 | (Australia) Talia Gibson | 4 | 4

Final
4 | (Australia) Maddison Inglis | 4 | 4
3 | (Australia) Emerson Jones | 6 | 6

=== Top half ===
First round
1 | (Ukraine) Y Starodubtseva | 6 | 3 | 6
Q | (New Zealand) V Ivanov | 3 | 6 | 4
WC | (Australia) G Da Silva-Fick | 3 | 2
Q | (Australia) S Rokusek | 6 | 6
(Japan) I Yamazaki | 6 | 6
WC | (Australia) A Subasic | 1 | 4
(South Korea) B-y Jeong | 1 | 6 | 0
6 | ' (Australia) T Preston | 6 | 3 | 6
4 | (Australia) M Inglis | 6 | 6
Q | (New Zealand) M Barry | 4 | 1
(Japan) S Imamura | 4 | 4
WC | (Australia) T Kokkinis | 6 | 6
(United States) L Ma | 4 | 7 | 6
Q | (China) C Yuan | 6 | 5 | 4
(South Korea) D-y Back | 4 | 0
5 | (China) S Wei | 6 | 6

Second round
1 | (Ukraine) Y Starodubtseva | 6 | 6
Q | (Australia) S Rokusek | 1 | 3
(Japan) I Yamazaki | 6 | 3 | 4
6 | (Australia) T Preston | 4 | 6 | 6
4 | (Australia) M Inglis | 7^{7} | 6
WC | (Australia) T Kokkinis | 6^{3} | 3
(United States) L Ma | 6^{8} | 3
5 | (China) S Wei | 7^{10} | 6

Quarterfinals
1 | (Ukraine) Y Starodubtseva | 0 | 4
6 | (Australia) T Preston | 6 | 6
4 | (Australia) M Inglis | 7 | 6
5 | (China) S Wei | 5 | 3

Semifinals
6 | (Australia) T Preston | 5 | 1
4 | (Australia) M Inglis | 7 | 6

=== Bottom half ===
First round
7 | (Australia) D Aiava | 4 | 6 | 3
(Australia) S Hunter | 6 | 1 | 6
(China) F Tian | 6 | 7^{7}
Q | A Varaksina | 1 | 6^{4}
(South Korea) E-h Lee | 1 | 3
(Japan) M Yamaguchi | 6 | 6
Q | (Australia) B Thompson | 5 | 2
3 | (Australia) E Jones | 7 | 6
8 | (Australia) L Cabrera | 6^{5} | 4
(Australia) E Micic | 7^{7} | 6
(United Kingdom) K Swan | 1^{r}
Q | A Bulatova | 2
(Ukraine) K Zavatska | 6^{1} | 7^{9} | 6
Q | (Australia) A Osborne | 7^{7} | 6^{7} | 1
(Japan) M Kuramochi | 0 | 6 | 1
2 | (Australia) T Gibson | 6 | 2 | 6

Second round
(Australia) S Hunter | 4 | 1
(China) F Tian | 6 | 6
(Japan) M Yamaguchi | 4 | 2
3 | (Australia) E Jones | 6 | 6
(Australia) E Micic | 6 | 4 | 6
Q | A Bulatova | 3 | 6 | 2
(Ukraine) K Zavatska | 1 | 2
2 | (Australia) T Gibson | 6 | 6

Quarterfinals
(China) F Tian | 1 | 2
3 | (Australia) E Jones | 6 | 6
(Australia) E Micic | 4 | 6 | 1
2 | (Australia) T Gibson | 6 | 2 | 6

Semifinals
3 | (Australia) E Jones | 6 | 6
2 | (Australia) T Gibson | 4 | 4
