= 2026 NSW Open – Men's singles =

Men's singles
- 2026 NSW Open

Final
- Champion: (United States) Sebastian Gorzny
- Runner-up: (Australia) Omar Jasika
- Score: 6–4, 6–3

Events
Singles	men	women
Doubles	men	women
- NSW Open

James Duckworth was the defending champion but chose not to defend his title.

Sebastian Gorzny won the title after defeating Omar Jasika 6–4, 6–3 in the final.

== Seeds ==
1. (Australia) Dane Sweeny (first round)
2. (Australia) Christopher O'Connell (first round)
3. (Australia) Tristan Schoolkate (quarterfinals)
4. (Australia) Alex Bolt (first round)
5. (Australia) Matthew Dellavedova (first round)
6. (China) Shang Juncheng (first round)
7. (Denmark) August Holmgren (first round)
8. (Australia) James McCabe (first round)

== Draw ==
Key

- Q = Qualifier
- WC = Wild card
- LL = Lucky loser
- Alt = Alternate
- ITF = ITF entry
- PR = Protected ranking
- SR = Special ranking
- SE = Special exempt
- JE = Junior exempt
- JR = Junior Accelerator Programme entrant
- CO = College Accelerator Programme entrant
- NG = Next Gen Accelerator Program entrant
- w/o = Walkover
- r = Retired
- d = Defaulted

=== Finals ===
Semifinals
(United States) Sebastian Gorzny	7^{7}	1	6
WC	(Australia) Li Tu	6^{2}	6	3
(Australia) Omar Jasika	6	3
(Australia) Philip Sekulic	2	0^{r}

Final
(United States) Sebastian Gorzny	6	6
(Australia) Omar Jasika	4	3

=== Top half ===
First round
1	(Australia) D Sweeny	6	6^{5}	5
SE	(United States) Christian Langmo	4	7^{7}	7
WC	(Australia) Casey Hoole	5	4
(Germany) F Broska	7	6
Q	(Japan) K Isomura	2	4
(United States) S Gorzny	6	6
(Australia) M Bouzige	2	6	6
6	(China) J Shang	6	0	4
3	(Australia) T Schoolkate	6	6
(Denmark) CE Overbeck	2	1
(United States) A Ayeni	6	6
WC	(Australia) Mustafa Ege Şık	3	2
Q	(New Zealand) I Becroft	6^{2}	6	6
(Australia) B Ellis	7^{7}	3	3
WC	(Australia) L Tu	6	7
8	(Australia) J McCabe	4	5

Second round
SE	(United States) C Langmo	7	7^{7}
(Germany) F Broska	5	6^{3}
(United States) S Gorzny	6	6
(Australia) M Bouzige	4	1
3	(Australia) T Schoolkate	6	6
(United States) A Ayeni	1	3
Q	(New Zealand) I Becroft	3	3
WC	(Australia) L Tu	6	6

Quarterfinals
SE	(United States) C Langmo	6^{5}	7^{7}	3
(United States) S Gorzny	7^{7}	6^{5}	6
3	(Australia) T Schoolkate	4	6	6^{5}
WC	(Australia) L Tu	6	3	7^{7}

Semifinals
(United States) S Gorzny	7^{7}	1	6
WC	(Australia) L Tu	6^{2}	6	3

=== Bottom half ===
First round
7	(Denmark) A Holmgren	7^{7}	5	4
(India) D Suresh	6^{3}	7	6
Q	(Australia) Derek Pham	7^{8}	4	1
Q	(Japan) H Moriya	6^{6}	6	6
(Australia) Ja Delaney	6	6^{3}	6^{7}
LL	(Australia) Pavle Marinkov	4	7^{7}	7^{9}
(Australia) O Jasika	4	6	7
4	(Australia) A Bolt	6	3	5
5	(Australia) Matthew Dellavedova	6^{3}	7^{8}	2
Q	(Australia) J Kubler	7^{7}	6^{6}	6
LL	(Czech Republic) D Palán	4	4
(Australia) P Sekulic	6	6
Q	(United States) E Zhu	5	3
(Australia) E Winter	7	6
(Australia) Enzo Aguiard	7^{7}	6
2	(Australia) C O'Connell	6^{2}	4

Second round
(India) D Suresh	6^{3}	4
Q	(Japan) H Moriya	7^{7}	6
LL	(Australia) P Marinkov	2	3
(Australia) O Jasika	6	6
Q	(Australia) J Kubler	4	6	1
(Australia) P Sekulic	6	4	6
(Australia) E Winter	3	6	6^{3}
(Australia) E Aguiard	6	2	7^{7}

Quarterfinals
Q	(Japan) H Moriya	3	4
(Australia) O Jasika	6	6
(Australia) P Sekulic	6	7^{7}
(Australia) E Aguiard	4	6^{4}

Semifinals
(Australia) O Jasika	6	3
(Australia) P Sekulic	2	0^{r}
