= 2026 NSW Open =

- Date: 16–22 November
- Edition: 6th (men); 12th (women)
- Category: ATP Challenger Tour; ITF Women's World Tennis Tour
- Surface: Hard / Outdoor
- Location: Sydney, Australia

Champions

Men's singles
- (United States) Sebastian Gorzny

Women's singles
- (Chinese Taipei) Joanna Garland

Men's doubles
- (Chinese Taipei) Jason Jung / (New Zealand) Ajeet Rai

Women's doubles
- (United States) Savannah Broadus / (Australia) Elena Micic
- NSW Open

The 2026 NSW Open was a combined men's and women's tennis tournament played on outdoor hard courts. It was the sixth edition of the tournament which was part of the 2026 ATP Challenger Tour and the 12th edition of the tournament which was part of the 2026 ITF Women's World Tennis Tour. It took place in Sydney, Australia between 16 and 22 November 2026.

== Champions ==
=== Men's singles ===
- (United States) Sebastian Gorzny def. (Australia) Omar Jasika 6–4, 6–3.

=== Women's singles ===
- (Chinese Taipei) Joanna Garland def. (Australia) Olivia Gadecki 5–7, 7–6^{(7–4)}, 7–5

=== Men's doubles ===
- (Chinese Taipei) Jason Jung / (New Zealand) Ajeet Rai def. (Norway) Herman Høyeraal / (Australia) Eric Padgham 6–2, 6–2.

=== Women's doubles ===
- (United States) Savannah Broadus / (Australia) Elena Micic def. (Japan) Natsumi Kawaguchi / (China) Zheng Wushuang 4–6, 6–1, [10–8]

== Men's singles main draw entrants ==
=== Seeds ===
Country	Player	Rank^{1}	Seed
AUS	Dane Sweeny	116	1
AUS	Christopher O'Connell	117	2
AUS	Tristan Schoolkate	144	3
AUS	Alex Bolt	171	4
AUS	Matthew Dellavedova	224	5
CHN	Shang Juncheng	252	6
DEN	August Holmgren	265	7
AUS	James McCabe	287	8

- ^{1} Rankings are as of 9 November 2026.

=== Other entrants ===
The following players received wildcards into the singles main draw:

- (Australia) Casey Hoole
- (Australia) Mustafa Ege Şık
- (Australia) Li Tu

The following player received entry into the singles main draw as a special exempt:

- (United States) Christian Langmo

The following players received entry from the qualifying draw:

- (New Zealand) Isaac Becroft
- (Japan) Kokoro Isomura
- (Australia) Jason Kubler
- (Japan) Hiroki Moriya
- (Australia) Derek Pham
- (United States) Evan Zhu

The following players received entry as lucky losers:

- (Australia) Pavle Marinkov
- (Czech Republic) Dominik Palán
