= 2025 City of Playford Tennis International =

- Date: 24–30 November
- Edition: 7th
- Category: ATP Challenger Tour; ITF Women's World Tennis Tour
- Surface: Hard / Outdoor
- Location: City of Playford, Australia

Champions

Men's singles
- (Australia) Rinky Hijikata

Women's singles
- (Australia) Emerson Jones

Men's doubles
- (Australia) Jake Delaney / (Australia) Li Tu

Women's doubles
- (Australia) Talia Gibson / (Australia) Maddison Inglis
- City of Playford Tennis International

The 2025 City of Playford Tennis International was a professional tennis tournament played on outdoor hard courts. It was the seventh edition of the tournament which was part of the 2025 ATP Challenger Tour and the 2025 ITF Women's World Tennis Tour. It took place in the City of Playford, Australia between 24 and 30 November 2025.

== Champions ==
=== Men's singles ===
- (Australia) Rinky Hijikata def. (Australia) Dane Sweeny 6–0, 6–7^{(8–10)}, 6–4.

=== Women's singles ===
- (Australia) Emerson Jones def. (Australia) Maddison Inglis 6–4, 6–4

=== Men's doubles ===
- (Australia) Jake Delaney / (Australia) Li Tu def. (India) Anirudh Chandrasekar / (United States) Reese Stalder 6–7^{(5–7)}, 7–5, [10–8].

=== Women's doubles ===
- (Australia) Talia Gibson / (Australia) Maddison Inglis def. (South Korea) Back Da-yeon / (South Korea) Lee Eun-hye 6–2, 6–0

== Men's singles main draw entrants ==
=== Seeds ===
Country	Player	Rank^{1}	Seed
AUS	James Duckworth	106	1
AUS	Rinky Hijikata	127	2
AUS	Bernard Tomic	182	3
AUS	Alex Bolt	188	4
AUS	Jason Kubler	190	5
AUS	James McCabe	196	6
AUS	Dane Sweeny	215	7
JPN	Rio Noguchi	242	8

- ^{1} Rankings are as of 17 November 2025.

=== Other entrants ===
The following players received wildcards into the singles main draw:

- (Australia) Jake Delaney
- (Australia) Cruz Hewitt
- (Australia) Tai Sach

The following player received entry into the singles main draw as a special exempt:

- (Japan) Hayato Matsuoka

The following players received entry from the qualifying draw:

- (United Kingdom) Finn Bass
- (Jamaica) Blaise Bicknell
- (Japan) Takuya Kumasaka
- (Japan) Ryuki Matsuda
- (Denmark) Carl Emil Overbeck
- (Chinese Taipei) Wu Tung-lin

The following players received entry as lucky losers:

- (Japan) Masamichi Imamura
- (Australia) Pavle Marinkov

== Women's singles main draw entrants ==
=== Seeds ===
Country	Player	Rank^{1}	Seed
UKR	Yuliia Starodubtseva	115	1
AUS	Talia Gibson	136	2
AUS	Emerson Jones	176	3
AUS	Maddison Inglis	177	4
CHN	Wei Sijia	206	5
AUS	Taylah Preston	217	6
AUS	Destanee Aiava	236	7
AUS	Lizette Cabrera	250	8

- ^{2} Rankings are as of 17 November 2025.

=== Other entrants ===
The following players received wildcards into the singles main draw:

- (Australia) Gabriella Da Silva-Fick
- (Australia) Tahlia Kokkinis
- (Australia) Alana Subasic

The following players received entry from the qualifying draw:

- (New Zealand) Monique Barry
- Arina Bulatova
- (New Zealand) Valentina Ivanov
- (Australia) Alexandra Osborne
- (Australia) Sarah Rokusek
- (Australia) Belle Thompson
- Arina Varaksina
- (China) Yuan Chengyiyi
