= 2024 Perth Tennis International 2 =

Tennis tournament

- Date: 16–22 September 2024
- Edition: 17th
- Category: ITF Women's World Tennis Tour
- Prize money: $60,000
- Surface: Hard / Outdoor
- Location: Perth, Australia

Champions

Singles
- (Australia) Talia Gibson

Doubles
- (Japan) Sakura Hosogi / (Japan) Misaki Matsuda
← 2023 ·	Perth Tennis International	· 2025 →

The 2024 Perth Tennis International 2 was a professional tennis tournament played on outdoor hard courts. It was the seventeenth edition of the tournament, which was part of the 2024 ITF Women's World Tennis Tour. It took place in Perth, Australia, between 16 and 22 September 2024.

== Champions ==
=== Singles ===
- (Australia) Talia Gibson def. (Japan) Eri Shimizu, 6–2, 6–4

=== Doubles ===
- (Japan) Sakura Hosogi / (Japan) Misaki Matsuda def. (United Kingdom) Naiktha Bains / (India) Ankita Raina, Walkover

== Singles main draw entrants ==
=== Seeds ===
Country	Player	Rank	Seed
AUS	Talia Gibson	165	1
AUS	Destanee Aiava	180	2
JPN	Aoi Ito	211	3
AUS	Maddison Inglis	229	4
JPN	Sayaka Ishii	266	5
IND	Ankita Raina	307	6
JPN	Ayano Shimizu	317	7
AUS	Melisa Ercan	327	8

- Rankings are as of 9 September 2024.

=== Other entrants ===
The following players received wildcards into the singles main draw:

- (Australia) Alexandra Bozovic
- (Australia) Alana Parnaby
- (Australia) Stefani Webb

The following players received entry from the qualifying draw:

- (Japan) Mayuka Aikawa
- (United Kingdom) Naiktha Bains
- (Japan) Nagi Hanatani
- (Japan) Ayumi Koshiishi
- (Australia) Elena Micic
- (Slovakia) Viktória Morvayová
- (Japan) Chihiro Muramatsu
- (Australia) Alexandra Osborne
