= 2026 Keio Challenger – Men's singles =

Men's singles
- 2026 Keio Challenger
- 2025 Champion: (Japan) Rei Sakamoto

Events
Singles	men	women
Doubles	men	women
- Keio Challenger

Rei Sakamoto was the defending champion but chose not to defend his title.

== Seeds ==
1. (Japan) Taro Daniel (withdrew)
2. (United States) Keegan Smith
3. (Spain) David Jordà Sanchis
4. (Japan) Rio Noguchi
5. (United Kingdom) Liam Broady
6. (Japan) Hayato Matsuoka
7. (Germany) Max Schönhaus
8. (Japan) Yosuke Watanuki
9. (Japan) Yuta Shimizu

== Draw ==
Key

- Q = Qualifier
- WC = Wild card
- LL = Lucky loser
- Alt = Alternate
- ITF = ITF entry
- PR = Protected ranking
- SR = Special ranking
- SE = Special exempt
- JE = Junior exempt
- JR = Junior Accelerator Programme entrant
- CO = College Accelerator Programme entrant
- NG = Next Gen Accelerator Program entrant
- w/o = Walkover
- r = Retired
- d = Defaulted

=== Finals ===
Semifinals

Final

=== Top half ===
First round
9	(Japan) Y Shimizu
Q
(Germany) N McDonald
(Switzerland) Luca Stäheli
(Japan) Naoya Honda
Q
(France) C Bittoun Kouzmine
5	(United Kingdom) L Broady
4	(Japan) R Noguchi
(Thailand) M Jones
(China) J Cui
(Lebanon) B Hassan
Q
Q
(Japan) Koki Matsuda
6	(Japan) H Matsuoka

Second round
Q
(Japan)

Quarterfinals

Semifinals

=== Bottom half ===
First round
7	(Germany) M Schönhaus
(Japan) M Imamura
Q
Q
WC	(Japan) Rintarou Ono
WC	(Japan) Lennon Roark Jones
Q
3	(Spain) D Jordà Sanchis
8	(Japan) Y Watanuki
(Japan) K Uchida
(Malaysia) Mitsuki Wei Kang Leong
WC	(Japan) Gai Ando
(Thailand) K Samrej
(Greece) D Sakellaridis
(Serbia) O Milić
2	(United States) K Smith

Second round
Q
WC	(Japan)
(Japan)

Quarterfinals

Semifinals
