= 2024 Perth Tennis International 2 – Doubles =

Doubles
- 2024 Perth Tennis International 2

Final
- Champions: (Japan) Sakura Hosogi (Japan) Misaki Matsuda
- Runners-up: (United Kingdom) Naiktha Bains (India) Ankita Raina
- Score: Walkover

Events
Singles	Doubles
← 2023 ·	Perth Tennis International	· 2025 →

Destanee Aiava and Maddison Inglis were the defending champions but Inglis chose not to participate. Aiava partnered alongside Petra Hule but they lost in the first round to Shrivalli Bhamidipaty and Tenika McGiffin.

Sakura Hosogi and Misaki Matsuda won the title after Naiktha Bains and Ankita Raina withdrew from the final.

== Seeds ==
1. (Japan) Naho Sato / (Japan) Ayano Shimizu (quarterfinals)
2. (United Kingdom) Naiktha Bains / (India) Ankita Raina (final, withdrew)
3. (Australia) Destanee Aiava / (Australia) Petra Hule (first round)
4. (New Zealand) Paige Hourigan / (Japan) Erika Sema (first round)

== Draw ==
=== Key ===
- Q = Qualifier
- WC = Wild card
- LL = Lucky loser
- Alt = Alternate
- SE = Special exempt
- PR = Protected ranking
- ITF = ITF entry
- JE = Junior exempt
- w/o = Walkover
- r = Retired
- d = Defaulted
- SR = Special ranking

First round
1	(Japan) N Sato (Japan) A Shimizu	6	6
(Japan) M Aikawa (Japan) H Sato	2	0
(Japan) S Hosogi (Japan) M Matsuda	6	6
(New Zealand) M Barry (Australia) E Micic	2	3
4	(New Zealand) P Hourigan (Japan) E Sema	1	4
(Japan) E Hayashi (Japan) S Imamura	6	6
(Australia) A Osborne (Australia) A Smith	6	6
(Japan) N Arakawa (Japan) A Koshiishi	4	0
WC	(Australia) C Stergiopoulos (Australia) B Thompson	6	6
WC	(Australia) A Katz (Australia) A Stevens	2	3
(India) S Bhamidipaty (Australia) T McGiffin	6	6
3	(Australia) D Aiava (Australia) P Hule	2	2
WC	(Australia) S McDonald (Australia) S Rokusek	2	2
(Japan) S Ishii (Japan) A Ito	6	6
Alt	(Australia) I Criddle (Australia) K Hiramatsu	1	0
2	(United Kingdom) N Bains (India) A Raina	6	6

Quarterfinals
1	(Japan) N Sato (Japan) A Shimizu	6	6^{5}	[9]
(Japan) S Hosogi (Japan) M Matsuda	4	7^{7}	[11]
(Japan) E Hayashi (Japan) S Imamura
(Australia) A Osborne (Australia) A Smith	w/o
WC	(Australia) C Stergiopoulos (Australia) B Thompson	6^{0}	6	[4]
(India) S Bhamidipaty (Australia) T McGiffin	7^{7}	3	[10]
(Japan) S Ishii (Japan) A Ito	1	5
2	(United Kingdom) N Bains (India) A Raina	6	7

Semifinals
(Japan) S Hosogi (Japan) M Matsuda	6	6
(Australia) A Osborne (Australia) A Smith	4	1
(India) S Bhamidipaty (Australia) T McGiffin	7	4	[7]
2	(United Kingdom) N Bains (India) A Raina	5	6	[10]

Final
(Japan) S Hosogi (Japan) M Matsuda	w/o
2	(United Kingdom) N Bains (India) A Raina
