= 2025 NSW Open – Men's doubles =

Men's doubles
- 2025 NSW Open

Final
- Champions: (Australia) Rinky Hijikata (Australia) Marc Polmans
- Runners-up: (Australia) Calum Puttergill (Australia) Dane Sweeny
- Score: 6–0, 6–4

Events
Singles	men	women
Doubles	men	women
- NSW Open

Blake Ellis and Thomas Fancutt were the defending champions but only Ellis chose to defend his title, partnering Joshua Charlton. He withdrew from the tournament before his first round match.

Rinky Hijikata and Marc Polmans won the title after defeating Calum Puttergill and Dane Sweeny 6–0, 6–4 in the final.

== Seeds ==
1. (India) Anirudh Chandrasekar / (United States) Reese Stalder (semifinals)
2. (Japan) Rio Noguchi / (Japan) Naoki Tajima (first round)
3. (Australia) Matt Hulme / (Australia) Kody Pearson (first round)
4. (Australia) Rinky Hijikata / (Australia) Marc Polmans (champions)

== Draw ==
Key

- Q = Qualifier
- WC = Wild card
- LL = Lucky loser
- Alt = Alternate
- ITF = ITF entry
- PR = Protected ranking
- SR = Special ranking
- SE = Special exempt
- JE = Junior exempt
- JR = Junior Accelerator Programme entrant
- CO = College Accelerator Programme entrant
- NG = Next Gen Accelerator Program entrant
- w/o = Walkover
- r = Retired
- d = Defaulted

First round
1	(India) A Chandrasekar (United States) R Stalder	4	6	[10]
(Japan) Takuya Kumasaka (Chinese Taipei) T-l Wu	6	1	[3]
(Australia) Ethan Cook (Australia) Je Delaney	6^{7}	6^{2}
PR	(Australia) B Bayldon (United Kingdom) B Walkin	7^{9}	7^{7}
4	(Australia) R Hijikata (Australia) M Polmans	6	6
(United Kingdom) F Bass (New Zealand) A Rai	1	3
(Australia) Ja Delaney (Australia) J Kubler	6	6^{11}	[10]
(Poland) F Peliwo (Australia) Tai Sach	4	7^{13}	[6]
WC	(Australia) H Jones (Australia) Pavle Marinkov	1	0
WC	(Australia) C Hewitt (Australia) L Hewitt	6	6
(Australia) C Puttergill (Australia) D Sweeny	6	6^{10}	[17]
3	(Australia) M Hulme (Australia) K Pearson	4	7^{12}	[15]
(Czech Republic) M Gengel (United Kingdom) Emile Hudd	6	7^{7}
Alt	(Japan) Kosuke Ogura (Denmark) CE Overbeck	2	6^{3}
(Japan) S Hazawa (Japan) Leo Vithoontien	7^{7}	2	[10]
2	(Japan) R Noguchi (Japan) N Tajima	6^{5}	6	[8]

Quarterfinals
1	(India) A Chandrasekar (United States) R Stalder	7^{10}	7
PR	(Australia) B Bayldon (United Kingdom) B Walkin	6^{8}	5
4	(Australia) R Hijikata (Australia) M Polmans	6^{5}	6	[10]
(Australia) Ja Delaney (Australia) J Kubler	7^{7}	4	[3]
WC	(Australia) C Hewitt (Australia) L Hewitt	5	4
(Australia) C Puttergill (Australia) D Sweeny	7	6
(Czech Republic) M Gengel (United Kingdom) E Hudd	6	6
(Japan) S Hazawa (Japan) L Vithoontien	3	2

Semifinals
1	(India) A Chandrasekar (United States) R Stalder	2	4
4	(Australia) R Hijikata (Australia) M Polmans	6	6
(Australia) C Puttergill (Australia) D Sweeny	7	6
(Czech Republic) M Gengel (United Kingdom) E Hudd	5	4

Final
4	(Australia) R Hijikata (Australia) M Polmans	6	6
(Australia) C Puttergill (Australia) D Sweeny	0	4
