= 2026 NSW Open – Men's doubles =

Men's doubles
- 2026 NSW Open

Final
- Champions: (Chinese Taipei) Jason Jung (New Zealand) Ajeet Rai
- Runners-up: (Norway) Herman Høyeraal (Australia) Eric Padgham
- Score: 6–2, 6–2

Events
Singles	men	women
Doubles	men	women
- NSW Open

Rinky Hijikata and Marc Polmans were the defending champions but chose not to defend their title.

Jason Jung and Ajeet Rai won the title after defeating Herman Høyeraal and Eric Padgham 6–2, 6–2 in the final.

== Seeds ==
1. (Australia) Jason Kubler / (Australia) Calum Puttergill (semifinals)
2. (Australia) Blake Bayldon / (Australia) Thomas Fancutt (first round)
3. (Chinese Taipei) Jason Jung / (New Zealand) Ajeet Rai (champions)
4. (Australia) Jake Delaney / (Australia) Jesse Delaney (first round)

== Draw ==
Key

- Q = Qualifier
- WC = Wild card
- LL = Lucky loser
- Alt = Alternate
- ITF = ITF entry
- PR = Protected ranking
- SR = Special ranking
- SE = Special exempt
- JE = Junior exempt
- JR = Junior Accelerator Programme entrant
- CO = College Accelerator Programme entrant
- NG = Next Gen Accelerator Program entrant
- w/o = Walkover
- r = Retired
- d = Defaulted

First round
1	(Australia) J Kubler (Australia) C Puttergill	6	6
(Australia) Ethan Cook (Australia) Tai Sach	3	3
Alt	(Germany) F Broska (Japan) K Isomura	1	1
(Japan) S Hazawa (Japan) Yamato Sueoka	6	6
4	(Australia) Ja Delaney (Australia) Je Delaney	6	3	[5]
WC	(Australia) Casey Hoole (Australia) Stefan Vujic	4	6	[10]
(Norway) Herman Høyeraal (Australia) Eric Padgham	6^{5}	6	[10]
WC	(Australia) H Jones (Australia) Derek Pham	7^{7}	3	[4]
(New Zealand) I Becroft (New Zealand) Anton Shepp	7^{7}	3	[8]
(New Zealand) Reece Falck (United States) B Suarez	6^{3}	6	[10]
Alt	(Australia) Benjamin O'Connell (Australia) Sam Ryan Ziegann	2	4
3	(Chinese Taipei) J Jung (New Zealand) A Rai	6	6
(Australia) B Ellis (Australia) L Tu	6	7^{7}
(Japan) A Santillan (China) B Zheng	2	6^{2}
(Chinese Taipei) J Hsu (United States) E Zhu	3	6	[10]
2	(Australia) B Bayldon (Australia) T Fancutt	6	3	[8]

Quarterfinals
1	(Australia) J Kubler (Australia) C Puttergill	6	4	[10]
(Japan) S Hazawa (Japan) Y Sueoka	2	6	[8]
WC	(Australia) C Hoole (Australia) S Vujic	2	7^{7}	[6]
(Norway) H Høyeraal (Australia) E Padgham	6	6^{1}	[10]
(New Zealand) R Falck (United States) B Suarez	3	2
3	(Chinese Taipei) J Jung (New Zealand) A Rai	6	6
(Australia) B Ellis (Australia) L Tu	6	6
(Chinese Taipei) J Hsu (United States) E Zhu	3	1

Semifinals
1	(Australia) J Kubler (Australia) C Puttergill	5	4
(Norway) H Høyeraal (Australia) E Padgham	7	6
3	(Chinese Taipei) J Jung (New Zealand) A Rai	7^{7}	6^{8}	[10]
(Australia) B Ellis (Australia) L Tu	6^{4}	7^{10}	[7]

Final
(Norway) H Høyeraal (Australia) E Padgham	2	2
3	(Chinese Taipei) J Jung (New Zealand) A Rai	6	6
