= 2026 Keio Challenger – Men's doubles =

Men's doubles
- 2026 Keio Challenger
- 2025 Champions: (Austria) Neil Oberleitner (Czech Republic) Michael Vrbenský

Events
Singles	men	women
Doubles	men	women
- Keio Challenger

Neil Oberleitner and Michael Vrbenský were the defending champions but chose not to defend their title.

== Seeds ==
1. (India) Anirudh Chandrasekar / (Netherlands) Thijmen Loof
2. (Romania) Alexandru Jecan / (Poland) Szymon Kielan
3. (France) Constantin Bittoun Kouzmine / (Czech Republic) David Poljak
4. (United Kingdom) Finn Bass / (United Kingdom) Scott Duncan

== Draw ==
Key

- Q = Qualifier
- WC = Wild card
- LL = Lucky loser
- Alt = Alternate
- ITF = ITF entry
- PR = Protected ranking
- SR = Special ranking
- SE = Special exempt
- JE = Junior exempt
- JR = Junior Accelerator Programme entrant
- CO = College Accelerator Programme entrant
- NG = Next Gen Accelerator Program entrant
- w/o = Walkover
- r = Retired
- d = Defaulted

First round
1	(India) A Chandrasekar (Netherlands) T Loof
(Chinese Taipei) J Hsu (Malaysia) Mitsuki Wei Kang Leong
WC	(Japan) Lennon Roark Jones (Japan) Shogo Sanada
(Japan) Tomohiro Masabayashi (Japan) Koki Matsuda
3	(France) C Bittoun Kouzmine (Czech Republic) D Poljak
(Japan) M Imamura (Japan) Ryuki Matsuda
(India) SDP Dev (India) Nitin Kumar Sinha
(South Korea) Y-s Chung (Chinese Taipei) C-p Hsieh
(China) J Cui (Chinese Taipei) R Ho
(Japan) K Isomura (Japan) Hikaru Shiraishi
(Chinese Taipei) Lai Chin-kuan (Greece) D Sakellaridis
4	(United Kingdom) F Bass (United Kingdom) S Duncan
WC	(Japan) Ryuto Suzuki (Japan) Yuma Tobe
(Thailand) M Jones (Switzerland) Luca Stǎheli
(Japan) T Ichikawa (Japan) Y Shimizu
2	(Romania) A Jecan (Poland) S Kielan

Quarterfinals
(Japan) (Japan)

Semifinals

Final
