= 2025 NSW Open – Men's singles =

Men's singles
- 2025 NSW Open

Final
- Champion: (Australia) James Duckworth
- Runner-up: (Japan) Hayato Matsuoka
- Score: 6–1, 6–4

Events
| Singles | men | women |
| Doubles | men | women |
- NSW Open

Thanasi Kokkinakis was the defending champion but chose not to defend his title.

James Duckworth won the title after defeating Hayato Matsuoka 6–1, 6–4 in the final.

== Seeds ==
1. (Australia) James Duckworth (champion)
2. (Australia) Rinky Hijikata (quarterfinals)
3. (Australia) Bernard Tomic (first round, retired)
4. (Australia) Jason Kubler (semifinals)
5. (Australia) James McCabe (semifinals)
6. (Australia) Dane Sweeny (quarterfinals)
7. (Australia) Alex Bolt (quarterfinals)
8. (Japan) Rio Noguchi (first round)

== Draw ==
Key

- Q = Qualifier
- WC = Wild card
- LL = Lucky loser
- Alt = Alternate
- ITF = ITF entry
- PR = Protected ranking
- SR = Special ranking
- SE = Special exempt
- JE = Junior exempt
- JR = Junior Accelerator Programme entrant
- CO = College Accelerator Programme entrant
- NG = Next Gen Accelerator Program entrant
- w/o = Walkover
- r = Retired
- d = Defaulted

=== Finals ===
Semifinals
1 | (Australia) James Duckworth | 7 | 6
4 | (Australia) Jason Kubler | 5 | 2
Q | (Japan) Hayato Matsuoka | 7 | 6
5 | (Australia) James McCabe | 5 | 4

Final
1 | (Australia) James Duckworth | 6 | 6
Q | (Japan) Hayato Matsuoka | 1 | 4

=== Top half ===
First round
1 | (Australia) J Duckworth | 6 | 6
(Australia) M Bouzige | 4 | 1
(Poland) F Peliwo | 2 | 2
(Australia) Matthew Dellavedova | 6 | 6
SE | (Chinese Taipei) T-l Wu | 6 | 3 | 7
Q | (Australia) M Polmans | 4 | 6 | 5
(United States) Christian Langmo | 0^{r}
6 | (Australia) D Sweeny | 2
4 | (Australia) J Kubler | 6 | 1 | 6
LL | (Australia) Pavle Marinkov | 3 | 6 | 2
WC | (Australia) H Jones | 7 | 4 | 5
(Czech Republic) M Gengel | 5 | 6 | 7
(Australia) P Sekulic | 6 | 2 | 6
Q | (United Kingdom) Emile Hudd | 3 | 6 | 3
Alt | (Japan) Takuya Kumasaka | 3 | 4
7 | (Australia) A Bolt | 6 | 6

Second round
1 | (Australia) J Duckworth | 6 | 6
(Australia) M Dellavedova | 3 | 0
SE | (Chinese Taipei) T-l Wu | 1 | 6^{5}
6 | (Australia) D Sweeny | 6 | 7^{7}
4 | (Australia) J Kubler | 6 | 6
(Czech Republic) M Gengel | 4 | 2
(Australia) P Sekulic | 2 | 1
7 | (Australia) A Bolt | 6 | 6

Quarterfinals
1 | (Australia) J Duckworth | 6 | 6
6 | (Australia) D Sweeny | 2 | 3
4 | (Australia) J Kubler | 7 | 6
7 | (Australia) A Bolt | 5 | 3

Semifinals
1 | (Australia) J Duckworth | 7 | 6
4 | (Australia) J Kubler | 5 | 2

=== Bottom half ===
First round
8 | (Japan) R Noguchi | 6 | 1 | 2
WC | (Australia) Tai Sach | 2 | 6 | 6
(Australia) B Ellis | 6^{0} | 6 | 6
Q | (Japan) S Hazawa | 7^{7} | 2 | 4
WC | (Australia) C Hewitt | 3 | 7^{8} | 6
(Australia) O Jasika | 6 | 6^{6} | 4
Q | (Japan) H Matsuoka | 6 | 0
3 | (Australia) B Tomic | 4 | 0^{r}
5 | (Australia) J McCabe | 6 | 6
(Japan) H Moriya | 4 | 3
(India) K Singh | 7^{7} | 6
(India) Aryan Shah | 6^{2} | 3
Q | (Australia) Ja Delaney | 3 | 2
Q | (Denmark) CE Overbeck | 6 | 6
LL | (Jamaica) B Bicknell | 4 | 7 | 2
2 | (Australia) R Hijikata | 6 | 5 | 6

Second round
WC | (Australia) T Sach | w/o
(Australia) B Ellis
WC | (Australia) C Hewitt | 7 | 3 | 5
Q | (Japan) H Matsuoka | 5 | 6 | 7
5 | (Australia) J McCabe | 6 | 6
(India) K Singh | 3 | 2
Q | (Denmark) CE Overbeck | 6^{3} | 6^{2}
2 | (Australia) R Hijikata | 7^{7} | 7^{7}

Quarterfinals
WC | (Australia) T Sach | 6 | 5 | 1
Q | (Japan) H Matsuoka | 4 | 7 | 6
5 | (Australia) J McCabe | 6 | 7
2 | (Australia) R Hijikata | 3 | 5

Semifinals
Q | (Japan) H Matsuoka | 7 | 6
5 | (Australia) J McCabe | 5 | 4
