= Hiromi Abe =

Japanese tennis player (born 2000)

Hiromi Abe 阿部 寛美
- Country (sports): Japan
- Born: 2 May 2000 (age 26) Kasugai, Japan
- Plays: Right (two-handed backhand)
- Prize money: $91,030

Singles
- Career record: 158–78
- Career titles: 6 ITF
- Highest ranking: No. 284 (16 February 2026)
- Current ranking: No. 358 (14 September 2026)

Doubles
- Career record: 129–38
- Career titles: 22 ITF
- Highest ranking: No. 226 (24 November 2025)
- Current ranking: No. 363 (14 September 2026)
- Last updated on: 19 September 2026.

Hiromi Abe (阿部 寛美, Abe Hiromi; born 2 May 2000) is a Japanese tennis player.

Abe has a career-high singles ranking by the WTA of 284, achieved on 16 February 2026, and a best doubles ranking of world No. 226, achieved on 24 November 2025.

Born in Kasugai City, she started playing tennis at the age of six and turned professional in 2022.

== Career ==
Abe won her first W75 title at the 2025 NSW Open in the doubles draw, partnering with Ikumi Yamazaki.

== ITF Circuit finals ==
=== Singles: 14 (8 titles, 6 runner-ups) ===
Legend W75 tournaments (0–1) W50 tournaments (1–0) W25/35 tournaments (2–2) W15 tournaments (5–3)	Finals by surface Hard (7–5) Carpet (1–1)

Result	W–L	Date	Tournament	Tier	Surface	Opponent	Score
Win	1–0	Feb 2022	ITF Sharm El Sheikh, Egypt	W15	Hard	(Romania) Elena-Teodora Cadar	6–2, 6–1
Loss	1–1	Jun 2024	ITF Tokyo, Japan	W15	Hard	(Japan) Akiko Omae	2–6, 6–7^{(2)}
Loss	1–2	Aug 2024	ITF Monastir, Tunisia	W15	Hard	(Belgium) Eliessa Vanlangendonck	2–6, 4–6
Loss	1–3	Aug 2024	ITF Monastir, Tunisia	W15	Hard	(France) Yasmine Mansouri	7–5, 3–6, 1–6
Win	2–3	Sep 2024	ITF Monastir, Tunisia	W15	Hard	(United States) Eryn Cayetano	6–4, 1–6, 6–3
Loss	2–4	Dec 2024	ITF Tauranga, New Zealand	W35	Hard	(Indonesia) Janice Tjen	2–6, 1–6
Win	3–4	Jan 2025	ITF Monastir, Tunisia	W15	Hard	(Greece) Martha Matoula	6–0, 6–0
Loss	3–5	Mar 2025	ITF Solarino, Italy	W35	Carpet	(Italy) Samira De Stefano	3–6, 3–6
Win	4–5	Aug 2025	ITF Aldershot, United Kingdom	W35	Hard	(France) Harmony Tan	7–6^{(4)}, 6–2
Loss	4–6	Jan 2026	ITF Nonthaburi, Thailand	W75	Hard	(Italy) Lisa Pigato	4–6, 7–6^{(6)}, 2–6
Win	5–6	May 2026	ITF Toyama, Japan	W15	Hard	(Japan) Sae Noguchi	5–7, 7–6^{(2)}, 6–3
Win	6–6	May 2026	ITF Fukui, Japan	W15	Hard	(Japan) Natsuki Yoshimoto	6–3, 7–5
Win	7–6	Sep 2026	ITF Kyoto, Japan	W35	Hard (i)	(China) Lu Jiajing	3–6, 6–3, 7–6^{(5)}
Win	8–6	Sep 2026	ITF Nanao, Japan	W50	Carpet	(Japan) Sakura Hosogi	6–4, 6–3

=== Doubles: 29 (23 titles, 6 runner-ups) ===
Legend W100 tournaments (0–1) W75 tournaments (1–0) W50 tournaments (0–2) W25/35 tournaments (10–3) W15 tournaments (12–0)	Finals by surface Hard (19–5) Carpet (4–1)

Result	W–L	Date	Tournament	Tier	Surface	Partner	Opponents	Score
Win	1–0	Feb 2022	ITF Sharm El Sheikh, Egypt	W15	Hard	(Chinese Taipei) Lee Pei-chi	(Romania) Elena-Teodora Cadar (Hong Kong) Cody Wong	5–7, 7–5, [10–2]
Win	2–0	Mar 2022	ITF Sharm El Sheikh, Egypt	W15	Hard	(Czech Republic) Ivana Šebestová	(Italy) Silvia Ambrosio (Romania) Elena-Teodora Cadar	6–4, 1–6, [10–4]
Loss	2–1	Sep 2023	ITF Kyoto, Japan	W25	Hard	(Japan) Anri Nagata	(Japan) Aoi Ito (Chinese Taipei) Tsao Chia-yi	2–6, 1–6
Win	3–1	Oct 2023	ITF Makinohara, Japan	W25	Carpet	(Japan) Anri Nagata	(Japan) Rina Saigo (Japan) Yukina Saigo	1–6, 7–5, [10–8]
Win	4–1	Oct 2023	ITF Hamamatsu, Japan	W25	Carpet	(Japan) Natsumi Kawaguchi	(Japan) Haruna Arakawa (Japan) Aoi Ito	3–6, 6–4, [10–4]
Win	5–1	Dec 2023	ITF Solapur, India	W25	Hard	(Japan) Saki Imamura	(Japan) Funa Kozaki (Japan) Misaki Matsuda	6–3, 6–1
Win	6–1	Mar 2024	ITF Monastir, Tunisia	W15	Hard	(Japan) Natsuho Arakawa	(China) Aitiyaguli Aixirefu (China) Xiao Zhenghua	3–6, 7–6^{(3)}, [10–3]
Win	7–1	May 2024	ITF Toyama, Japan	W15	Hard	(Japan) Anri Nagata	(Japan) Rinko Matsuda (Japan) Sera Nishimoto	6–2, 6–3
Win	8–1	May 2024	ITF Fukui, Japan	W15	Hard	(Japan) Anri Nagata	(South Korea) Kim Yu-jin (Chinese Taipei) Lin Fang-an	6–4, 6–0
Win	9–1	Jun 2024	ITF Tokyo, Japan	W15	Hard	(Japan) Kanako Morisaki	(Japan) Yuka Hosoki (Japan) Funa Kozaki	6–2, 6–2
Win	10–1	Jun 2024	ITF Hong Kong	W15	Hard	(Japan) Saki Imamura	(China) Dang Yiming; Anastasia Zolotareva	6–4, 6–1
Loss	10–2	Jul 2024	ITF Hong Kong	W35	Hard	(Japan) Saki Imamura	(Hong Kong) Eudice Chong (Hong Kong) Cody Wong	4–6, 6–3, [7–10]
Win	11–2	Jul 2024	ITF Monastir, Tunisia	W15	Hard	(Japan) Nanari Katsumi	(France) Astrid Cirotte (France) Emmanuelle Girard	6–0, 6–3
Win	12–2	Aug 2024	ITF Monastir, Tunisia	W15	Hard	(Japan) Nanari Katsumi	(Greece) Dimitra Pavlou (Slovakia) Alica Rusová	6–2, 6–4
Win	13–2	Aug 2024	ITF Monastir, Tunisia	W15	Hard	(Japan) Haine Ogata	(Turkey) Leyla Nilufer Elmas (Greece) Dimitra Pavlou	6–0, 6–4
Win	14–2	Nov 2024	ITF Hamamatsu, Japan	W35	Carpet	(Japan) Akiko Omae	(Japan) Momoko Kobori (Japan) Ayano Shimizu	6–0, 6–0
Win	15–2	Dec 2024	ITF Tauranga, New Zealand	W35	Hard	(Japan) Shiho Akita	(Austria) Julia Grabher (New Zealand) Elyse Tse	6–2, 6–2
Win	16–2	Jan 2025	ITF Monastir, Tunisia	W15	Hard	(Japan) Mayuka Aikawa	(Japan) Hayu Kinoshita; Ksenia Zaytseva	6–3, 6–0
Win	17–2	Jan 2025	ITF Monastir, Tunisia	W15	Hard	(Japan) Mayuka Aikawa	(China) Guo Meiqi (China) Xiao Zhenghua	6–3, 6–0
Win	18–2	Mar 2025	ITF Solarino, Italy	W35	Carpet	(Japan) Hikaru Sato	(Spain) Celia Cerviño Ruiz (Spain) Lucía Cortez Llorca	6–2, 6–3
Loss	18–3	May 2025	ITF Goyang, South Korea	W35	Hard	(Japan) Ikumi Yamazaki	(China) Feng Shuo (China) Li Zongyu	2–6, 5–7
Win	19–3	May 2025	ITF Changwon, South Korea	W35	Hard	(Japan) Ikumi Yamazaki	(Chinese Taipei) Lee Ya-hsin (Hong Kong) Cody Wong	6–4, 6–2
Loss	19–4	Jun 2025	Guimarães Ladies Open, Portugal	W50	Hard	(Japan) Kanako Morisaki	(India) Ankita Raina (France) Alice Robbe	6–1, 4–6, [8–10]
Win	20–4	Jun 2025	ITF Tauste, Spain	W35	Hard	(Japan) Kanako Morisaki	(India) Rutuja Bhosale (India) Ankita Raina	6–3, 6–2
Win	21–4	Aug 2025	ITF Aldershot, United Kingdom	W35	Hard	(Japan) Akiko Omae	(United Kingdom) Esther Adeshina (United Kingdom) Victoria Allen	6–7^{(2)}, 6–3, [10–8]
Win	22–4	Nov 2025	NSW Open, Australia	W75	Hard	(Japan) Ikumi Yamazaki	(Australia) Petra Hule (Australia) Elena Micic	6–4, 6–4
Loss	22–5	Jun 2026	ITF Wuning, China	W100	Hard	(Thailand) Peangtarn Plipuech	(Chinese Taipei) Li Yu-yun (China) Zhang Ying	3–6, 2–6
Win	23–5	Sep 2026	ITF Kyoto, Japan	W35	Hard (i)	(United Kingdom) Amelia Rajecki	(Japan) Sayaka Ishii (Japan) Kanon Sawashiro	3–6, 6–2, [10–7]
Loss	23–6	Sep 2026	ITF Nanao, Japan	W50	Carpet	(Japan) Ikumi Yamazaki	(Japan) Ayumi Miyamoto (Japan) Kisa Yoshioka	6–2, 4–6, [13–15]
