= 2025 NSW Open – Women's doubles =

Women's doubles
- 2025 NSW Open

Final
- Champions: (Japan) Hiromi Abe (Japan) Ikumi Yamazaki
- Runners-up: (Australia) Petra Hule (Australia) Elena Micic
- Score: 6–4, 6–4

Events
Singles	men	women
Doubles	men	women
- NSW Open

Lizette Cabrera and Taylah Preston were the defending champions but chose not to defend their title.

Hiromi Abe and Ikumi Yamazaki won the title, defeating Petra Hule and Elena Micic in the final, 6–4, 6–4.

== Seeds ==
1. (Australia) Petra Hule / (Australia) Elena Micic (final)
2. (Japan) Hiromi Abe / (Japan) Ikumi Yamazaki (champions)
3. (Australia) Gabriella Da Silva-Fick / (Australia) Alexandra Osborne (semifinals)
4. (New Zealand) Monique Barry / (Australia) Tenika McGiffin (first round)

== Draw ==
Key

- Q = Qualifier
- WC = Wild card
- LL = Lucky loser
- Alt = Alternate
- ITF = ITF entry
- PR = Protected ranking
- SR = Special ranking
- SE = Special exempt
- JE = Junior exempt
- JR = Junior Accelerator Programme entrant
- CO = College Accelerator Programme entrant
- NG = Next Gen Accelerator Program entrant
- w/o = Walkover
- r = Retired
- d = Defaulted

=== Draw ===
First round
1	(Australia) P Hule (Australia) E Micic	6	6
(Australia) A Aulia (Australia) A-M Sycamore	4	0
(Japan) N Hanatani (Japan) H Satō	1	0
(Ukraine) Y Starodubtseva (Ukraine) K Zavatska	6	6
3	(Australia) G Da Silva-Fick (Australia) A Osborne	6	6
WC	(Australia) Ri Alame (Australia) K Cooper	2	4
(South Korea) G-e Jang (Japan) A Koshiishi	3	1
(South Korea) D-y Back (South Korea) E-h Lee	6	6
(Australia) E Kim (Australia) S Rokusek	1	2
(New Zealand) V Ivanov (China) F Tian	6	6
(Australia) D Aiava (Australia) M Inglis	7^{10}	7^{7}
4	(New Zealand) M Barry (Australia) T McGiffin	6^{8}	6^{1}
(Chinese Taipei) Y-y Yang (China) C Yuan	6	6
(South Korea) B-y Jeong (Japan) M Kuramochi	2	2
A Bulatova (Australia) B Thompson	1	4
2	(Japan) H Abe (Japan) I Yamazaki	6	6

Quarterfinals
1	(Australia) P Hule (Australia) E Micic	6	6
(Ukraine) Y Starodubtseva (Ukraine) K Zavatska	2	3
3	(Australia) G Da Silva-Fick (Australia) A Osborne	6	6
(South Korea) D-y Back (South Korea) E-h Lee	4	4
(New Zealand) V Ivanov (China) F Tian	7	6^{6}	[10]
(Australia) D Aiava (Australia) M Inglis	5	7^{8}	[7]
(Chinese Taipei) Y-y Yang (China) C Yuan	1	2
2	(Japan) H Abe (Japan) I Yamazaki	6	6

Semifinals
1	(Australia) P Hule (Australia) E Micic	5	7	[10]
3	(Australia) G Da Silva-Fick (Australia) A Osborne	7	5	[7]
(New Zealand) V Ivanov (China) F Tian	6^{5}	6	[6]
2	(Japan) H Abe (Japan) I Yamazaki	7^{7}	3	[10]

Final
1	(Australia) P Hule (Australia) E Micic	4	4
2	(Japan) H Abe (Japan) I Yamazaki	6	6
