= 2025 City of Playford Tennis International – Men's singles =

Men's singles
- 2025 City of Playford Tennis International

Final
- Champion: (Australia) Rinky Hijikata
- Runner-up: (Australia) Dane Sweeny
- Score: 6–0, 6–7^{(8–10)}, 6–4

Events
Singles	men	women
Doubles	men	women
- City of Playford Tennis International

Rinky Hijikata was the defending champion and successfully defended his title after defeating Dane Sweeny 6–0, 6–7^{(8–10)}, 6–4 in the final.

== Seeds ==
1. (Australia) James Duckworth (semifinals)
2. (Australia) Rinky Hijikata (champion)
3. (Australia) Bernard Tomic (second round)
4. (Australia) Alex Bolt (semifinals)
5. (Australia) Jason Kubler (second round, retired)
6. (Australia) James McCabe (quarterfinals)
7. (Australia) Dane Sweeny (final)
8. (Japan) Rio Noguchi (quarterfinals)

== Draw ==
Key

- Q = Qualifier
- WC = Wild card
- LL = Lucky loser
- Alt = Alternate
- ITF = ITF entry
- PR = Protected ranking
- SR = Special ranking
- SE = Special exempt
- JE = Junior exempt
- JR = Junior Accelerator Programme entrant
- CO = College Accelerator Programme entrant
- NG = Next Gen Accelerator Program entrant
- w/o = Walkover
- r = Retired
- d = Defaulted

=== Finals ===
Semifinals
1	(Australia) James Duckworth	6^{6}	7	6^{5}
7	(Australia) Dane Sweeny	7^{8}	5	7^{7}
4	(Australia) Alex Bolt	3	3
2	(Australia) Rinky Hijikata	6	6

Final
7	(Australia) Dane Sweeny	0	7^{10}	4
2	(Australia) Rinky Hijikata	6	6^{8}	6

=== Top half ===
First round
1	(Australia) J Duckworth	6	6
LL	(Japan) M Imamura	3	2
(India) K Singh	5	6	6
(Japan) K Isomura	7	4	3
(Japan) H Moriya	6	6
(United States) Christian Langmo	4	3
WC	(Australia) Ja Delaney	2	4
8	(Japan) R Noguchi	6	6
3	(Australia) B Tomic	6	6
(Czech Republic) M Gengel	2	3
WC	(Australia) C Hewitt	5	2
(Australia) P Sekulic	7	6
Q	(Japan) Ryuki Matsuda	4	6	5
(Japan) Hikaru Shiraishi	6	3	7
Q	(United Kingdom) F Bass	6	1	3
7	(Australia) D Sweeny	3	6	6

Second round
1	(Australia) J Duckworth	6	6
(India) K Singh	4	1
(Japan) H Moriya	4	4
8	(Japan) R Noguchi	6	6
3	(Australia) B Tomic	6	6^{4}	4
(Australia) P Sekulic	3	7^{7}	6
(Japan) H Shiraishi	2	4
7	(Australia) D Sweeny	6	6

Quarterfinals
1	(Australia) J Duckworth	7^{7}	6
8	(Japan) R Noguchi	6^{5}	2
(Australia) P Sekulic	2	4
7	(Australia) D Sweeny	6	6

Semifinals
1	(Australia) J Duckworth	6^{6}	7	6^{5}
7	(Australia) D Sweeny	7^{8}	5	7^{7}

=== Bottom half ===
First round
5	(Australia) J Kubler	6	6
(Australia) L Tu	3	3
(Australia) Matthew Dellavedova	6	5	2
Q	(Denmark) CE Overbeck	3	7	6
LL	(Australia) Pavle Marinkov	2	6	6
(Australia) B Ellis	6	3	4
(Australia) M Bouzige	4	2
4	(Australia) A Bolt	6	6
6	(Australia) J McCabe	6	6
Q	(Jamaica) B Bicknell	4	1
SE	(Japan) H Matsuoka	6	4	1
(Australia) M Polmans	4	6	6
WC	(Australia) Tai Sach	7	3	6
Q	(Chinese Taipei) T-l Wu	5	6	2
Q	(Japan) Takuya Kumasaka	2	0
2	(Australia) R Hijikata	6	6

Second round
5	(Australia) J Kubler	3	1^{r}
Q	(Denmark) CE Overbeck	6	3
LL	(Australia) P Marinkov	3	5
4	(Australia) A Bolt	6	7
6	(Australia) J McCabe	6	7^{7}
(Australia) M Polmans	2	6^{3}
WC	(Australia) T Sach	3	2
2	(Australia) R Hijikata	6	6

Quarterfinals
Q	(Denmark) CE Overbeck	6^{5}	4
4	(Australia) A Bolt	7^{7}	6
6	(Australia) J McCabe	6^{2}	2
2	(Australia) R Hijikata	7^{7}	6

Semifinals
4	(Australia) A Bolt	3	3
2	(Australia) R Hijikata	6	6
