= 2026 President's Cup – Men's singles =

Men's singles
- 2026 President's Cup

Final
- Champion: (Japan) Hayato Matsuoka
- Runner-up: (Tunisia) Aziz Dougaz
- Score: 0–6, 6–1, 7–6^{(7–5)}

Events
Singles	men	women
Doubles	men	women
- President's Cup

Nicolai Budkov Kjær was the defending champion but chose not to defend his title.

Hayato Matsuoka won the title after defeating Aziz Dougaz 0–6, 6–1, 7–6^{(7–5)} in the final.

== Seeds ==
1. Petr Bar Biryukov (second round)
2. (Turkey) Mert Alkaya (quarterfinals)
3. (Uzbekistan) Sergey Fomin (semifinals)
4. (Japan) Hayato Matsuoka (champion)
5. (China) Sun Fajing (quarterfinals)
6. (France) Antoine Ghibaudo (first round)
7. (India) Manas Dhamne (second round)
8. (Argentina) Lucio Ratti (second round)

== Draw ==
Key

- Q = Qualifier
- WC = Wild card
- LL = Lucky loser
- Alt = Alternate
- ITF = ITF entry
- PR = Protected ranking
- SR = Special ranking
- SE = Special exempt
- JE = Junior exempt
- JR = Junior Accelerator Programme entrant
- CO = College Accelerator Programme entrant
- NG = Next Gen Accelerator Program entrant
- w/o = Walkover
- r = Retired
- d = Defaulted

=== Finals ===
Semifinals
WC	(Tunisia) Aziz Dougaz	4	6	7
3	(Uzbekistan) Sergey Fomin	6	1	5
4	(Japan) Hayato Matsuoka	3	6	6
Alt	(Uzbekistan) Khumoyun Sultanov	6	3	4

Final
WC	(Tunisia) Aziz Dougaz	6	1	6^{5}
4	(Japan) Hayato Matsuoka	0	6	7^{7}

=== Top half ===
First round
1	P Bar Biryukov	6	6
Q	(Japan) T Ichikawa	2	3
(Tunisia) A Ouakaa	3	4
(China) J Cui	6	6
WC	(Tunisia) A Dougaz	6	2	6
Q	(Netherlands) Alec Deckers	3	6	3
(Ukraine) Vadym Ursu	4	6^{2}
7	(India) M Dhamne	6	7^{7}
3	(Uzbekistan) S Fomin	7	4
Alt	Maxim Zhukov	5	1^{r}
(Thailand) K Samrej	5	6	6
Q	(Japan) K Isomura	7	0	4
(South Korea) Shin San-hui	1	6	6^{4}
Q	E Arutiunian	6	1	7^{7}
(Japan) M Imamura	7^{7}	6
6	(France) A Ghibaudo	6^{5}	3

Second round
1	P Bar Biryukov	4	2
(China) J Cui	6	6
WC	(Tunisia) A Dougaz	7	6
7	(India) M Dhamne	5	3
3	(Uzbekistan) S Fomin	6	6
(Thailand) K Samrej	1	4
Q	E Arutiunian	3	4
(Japan) M Imamura	6	6

Quarterfinals
(China) J Cui	2	6	5
WC	(Tunisia) A Dougaz	6	4	7
3	(Uzbekistan) S Fomin	6	6
(Japan) M Imamura	2	1

Semifinals
WC	(Tunisia) A Dougaz	4	6	7
3	(Uzbekistan) S Fomin	6	1	5

=== Bottom half ===
First round
5	(China) F Sun	6	3	6
WC	(Kazakhstan) Z Nurlanuly	2	6	2
Semen Pankin	6	6
(Czech Republic) D Palán	1	4
(Japan) Takuya Kumasaka	6	7^{7}
Q	(Northern Mariana Islands) C Sinclair	2	6^{4}
Alt	(Japan) Koki Matsuda	3	4
4	(Japan) H Matsuoka	6	6
8	(Argentina) Lucio Ratti	6	6
(Australia) Tai Sach	3	3
Alt	(Uzbekistan) K Sultanov	6	6
(Italy) A Binda	3	2
WC	(Kazakhstan) A Omarkhanov	3	4
(Kazakhstan) B Zhukayev	6	6
Q	(India) Sidharth Rawat	2	4
2	(Turkey) Mert Alkaya	6	6

Second round
5	(China) F Sun	4	7^{7}	6
S Pankin	6	6^{4}	3
(Japan) T Kumasaka	4	1
4	(Japan) H Matsuoka	6	6
8	(Argentina) L Ratti	4	5
Alt	(Uzbekistan) K Sultanov	6	7
(Kazakhstan) B Zhukayev	3	4
2	(Turkey) M Alkaya	6	6

Quarterfinals
5	(China) F Sun	5	5
4	(Japan) H Matsuoka	7	7
Alt	(Uzbekistan) K Sultanov	7^{7}	6
2	(Turkey) M Alkaya	6^{5}	3

Semifinals
4	(Japan) H Matsuoka	3	6	6
Alt	(Uzbekistan) K Sultanov	6	3	4
