= 2026 President's Cup =

- Date: 10–16 August
- Edition: 21st (men); 17th (women)
- Category: ATP Challenger Tour; ITF Women's World Tennis Tour
- Surface: Hard / Outdoor
- Location: Astana, Kazakhstan

Champions

Men's singles
- (Japan) Hayato Matsuoka

Women's singles
- (Kazakhstan) Asylzhan Arystanbekova

Men's doubles
- (Japan) Taisei Ichikawa / (Japan) Masamichi Imamura

Women's doubles
- (South Korea) Kim Eun-chae / (South Korea) Lee Ha-eum
- President's Cup

The 2026 President's Cup was a professional tennis tournament played on outdoor hard courts. It was the 21st edition of the men's tournament which was part of the 2026 ATP Challenger Tour, and the 17th edition of the women's tournament which was part of the 2026 ITF Women's World Tennis Tour. It took place in Astana, Kazakhstan between 10 and 16 August 2026.

== Champions ==
=== Men's singles ===
- (Japan) Hayato Matsuoka def. (Tunisia) Aziz Dougaz 0–6, 6–1, 7–6^{(7–5)}.

=== Men's doubles ===
- (Japan) Taisei Ichikawa / (Japan) Masamichi Imamura def. Petr Bar Biryukov / (Kazakhstan) Grigoriy Lomakin 3–6, 7–6^{(7–4)}, [10–5].

=== Women's singles ===
- (Kazakhstan) Asylzhan Arystanbekova def. (Japan) Haruna Arakawa 6–2, 6–2

=== Women's doubles ===
- (South Korea) Kim Eun-chae / (South Korea) Lee Ha-eum def. Mariia Tkacheva / Daria Zelinskaya 6–1, 6–4

== Men's singles main draw entrants ==
=== Seeds ===
Country	Player	Rank^{1}	Seed
	Petr Bar Biryukov	285	1
TUR	Mert Alkaya	299	2
UZB	Sergey Fomin	305	3
JPN	Hayato Matsuoka	309	4
CHN	Sun Fajing	326	5
FRA	Antoine Ghibaudo	351	6
IND	Manas Dhamne	362	7
ARG	Lucio Ratti	380	8

- ^{1} Rankings are as of 3 August 2026.

=== Other entrants ===
The following players received wildcards into the singles main draw:

- (Tunisia) Aziz Dougaz
- (Kazakhstan) Zangar Nurlanuly
- (Kazakhstan) Amir Omarkhanov

The following players received entry into the singles main draw as alternates:

- (Japan) Koki Matsuda
- (Uzbekistan) Khumoyun Sultanov
- Maxim Zhukov

The following players received entry from the qualifying draw:

- Erik Arutiunian
- (Netherlands) Alec Deckers
- (Japan) Taisei Ichikawa
- (Japan) Kokoro Isomura
- (India) Sidharth Rawat
- (Northern Mariana Islands) Colin Sinclair
