= 2026 President's Cup – Men's doubles =

Men's doubles
- 2026 President's Cup

Final
- Champions: (Japan) Taisei Ichikawa (Japan) Masamichi Imamura
- Runners-up: Petr Bar Biryukov (Kazakhstan) Grigoriy Lomakin
- Score: 3–6, 7–6^{(7–4)}, [10–5]

Events
Singles	men	women
Doubles	men	women
- President's Cup

Taisei Ichikawa and Kokoro Isomura were the defending champions but chose to defend their title with different partners. Ichikawa partnered Masamichi Imamura and successfully defended his title. Isomura partnered Shin San-hui but lost in the first round to Lucio Ratti and Sun Fajing.

Ichikawa and Imamura won the title after defeating Petr Bar Biryukov and Grigoriy Lomakin 3–6, 7–6^{(7–4)}, [10–5] in the final.

== Seeds ==
1. (Australia) Ethan Cook / (Australia) Tai Sach (first round)
2. (South Korea) Park Ui-sung / (India) Nitin Kumar Sinha (first round)
3. (Japan) Yusuke Kusuhara / (Japan) Shunsuke Nakagawa (first round)
4. (India) Jeevan Nedunchezhiyan / (China) Wang Aoran (semifinals)

== Draw ==
Key

- Q = Qualifier
- WC = Wild card
- LL = Lucky loser
- Alt = Alternate
- ITF = ITF entry
- PR = Protected ranking
- SR = Special ranking
- SE = Special exempt
- JE = Junior exempt
- JR = Junior Accelerator Programme entrant
- CO = College Accelerator Programme entrant
- NG = Next Gen Accelerator Program entrant
- w/o = Walkover
- r = Retired
- d = Defaulted

First round
1	(Australia) Ethan Cook (Australia) Tai Sach	6	3	[7]
(China) J Cui (Ukraine) Vadym Ursu	3	6	[10]
P Bar Biryukov (Kazakhstan) G Lomakin	6	5	[10]
(Italy) A Binda (Uzbekistan) S Fomin	4	7	[5]
3	(Japan) Y Kusuhara (Japan) S Nakagawa	5	2
Alt	Anton Chekhov (Uzbekistan) K Sultanov	7	6
(Argentina) Lucio Ratti (China) F Sun	6	6
Alt	(Japan) K Isomura (South Korea) Shin San-hui	0	4
(Japan) Yamato Sueoka (Japan) N Tajima	6	6
(Cyprus) E Neos; Semen Pankin	4	4
WC	(Kazakhstan) A Omarkhanov (Kazakhstan) Danial Rakhmatullayev	4	6^{6}
4	(India) J Nedunchezhiyan (China) A Wang	6	7^{8}
(Japan) T Ichikawa (Japan) M Imamura	6	7^{7}
(Tunisia) A Ouakaa (Turkey) S Mert Özdemir	3	6^{5}
S Betov (India) K Singh	6	6
2	(South Korea) U-s Park (India) Nitin Kumar Sinha	3	4

Quarterfinals
(China) J Cui (Ukraine) V Ursu	2	1
P Bar Biryukov (Kazakhstan) G Lomakin	6	6
Alt	A Chekhov (Uzbekistan) K Sultanov	4	6	[3]
(Argentina) L Ratti (China) F Sun	6	3	[10]
(Japan) Y Sueoka (Japan) N Tajima	6^{6}	4
4	(India) J Nedunchezhiyan (China) A Wang	7^{8}	6
(Japan) T Ichikawa (Japan) M Imamura	6	6
S Betov (India) K Singh	4	3

Semifinals
P Bar Biryukov (Kazakhstan) G Lomakin	3	7^{8}	[10]
(Argentina) L Ratti (China) F Sun	6	6^{6}	[8]
4	(India) J Nedunchezhiyan (China) A Wang	4	6	[8]
(Japan) T Ichikawa (Japan) M Imamura	6	3	[10]

Final
P Bar Biryukov (Kazakhstan) G Lomakin	6	6^{4}	[5]
(Japan) T Ichikawa (Japan) M Imamura	3	7^{7}	[10]
