= 2026 Keio Challenger =

- Date: 23 – 29 November (men's); 9 – 15 November (women's)
- Edition: 19th (men's); 9th (women's)
- Category: ATP Challenger Tour; ITF Women's World Tennis Tour
- Surface: Hard
- Location: Yokohama, Japan

2025 Champions

Men's singles
- (Japan) Rei Sakamoto

Men's doubles
- (Austria) Neil Oberleitner / (Czech Republic) Michael Vrbenský

Champions

Women's singles
- (Japan) Kyōka Okamura

Women's doubles
- (Chinese Taipei) Li Yu-yun / (Japan) Sara Saito
- Keio Challenger

The 2026 Yokohama Keio Challenger was a professional tennis tournament played on hardcourts. It was the 19th (men's) and 9th (women's) editions of the tournament and part of the 2026 ATP Challenger Tour and the 2026 ITF Women's World Tennis Tour. It took place in Yokohama, Japan between 9 and 15 November for the women and 23 and 29 November for the men.

== Men's singles main-draw entrants ==
=== Seeds ===
Country	Player	Rank^{1}	Seed
~~JPN~~	~~Taro Daniel~~	~~168~~	~~1~~
USA	Keegan Smith	188	2
ESP	David Jordà Sanchis	192	3
JPN	Rio Noguchi	214	4
GBR	Liam Broady	259	5
JPN	Hayato Matsuoka	274	6
GER	Max Schönhaus	299	7
JPN	Yosuke Watanuki	326	8
JPN	Yuta Shimizu	363	9

- ^{1} Rankings are as of 16 November 2026.

=== Other entrants ===
The following players received wildcards into the singles main draw:

- (Japan) Gai Ando
- (Japan) Lennon Roark Jones
- (Japan) Rintarou Ono

The following players received entry from the qualifying draw:

- (Japan)
- (Japan)

The following player received entry as a lucky loser:

== Champions ==
=== Men's singles ===
- vs.

=== Women's singles ===
- (Japan) Kyōka Okamura def. (United Kingdom) Heather Watson 6–4, 6–4.

=== Men's doubles ===
- / vs. /

=== Women's doubles ===
- (Chinese Taipei) Li Yu-yun / (Japan) Sara Saito def. (South Korea) Kim Eun-chae / (Japan) Kanako Morisaki 6–4, 6–2.
