= 2025 City of Playford Tennis International – Men's doubles =

Men's doubles
- 2025 City of Playford Tennis International

Final
- Champions: (Australia) Jake Delaney (Australia) Li Tu
- Runners-up: (India) Anirudh Chandrasekar (United States) Reese Stalder
- Score: 6–7^{(5–7)}, 7–5, [10–8]

Events
| Singles | men | women |
| Doubles | men | women |
- City of Playford Tennis International

Blake Ellis and Thomas Fancutt were the defending champions but chose not to defend their title.

Jake Delaney and Li Tu won the title after defeating Anirudh Chandrasekar and Reese Stalder 6–7^{(5–7)}, 7–5, [10–8] in the final.

== Seeds ==
1. (India) Anirudh Chandrasekar / (United States) Reese Stalder (final)
2. (Australia) Matt Hulme / (Australia) Kody Pearson (first round)
3. (Japan) Masamichi Imamura / (Japan) Ryuki Matsuda (quarterfinals)
4. (United Kingdom) Finn Bass / (New Zealand) Ajeet Rai (quarterfinals)

== Draw ==
Key

- Q = Qualifier
- WC = Wild card
- LL = Lucky loser
- Alt = Alternate
- ITF = ITF entry
- PR = Protected ranking
- SR = Special ranking
- SE = Special exempt
- JE = Junior exempt
- JR = Junior Accelerator Programme entrant
- CO = College Accelerator Programme entrant
- NG = Next Gen Accelerator Program entrant
- w/o = Walkover
- r = Retired
- d = Defaulted

First round
1 | (India) A Chandrasekar (United States) R Stalder | 6 | 6
(Japan) K Isomura (Japan) Hikaru Shiraishi | 1 | 4
(Australia) J Charlton (Denmark) CE Overbeck | 6 | 6
WC | (Australia) Daniel Jovanovski (Australia) P Sekulic | 4 | 4
3 | (Japan) M Imamura (Japan) Ryuki Matsuda | 1 | 6 | [17]
(Australia) Tai Sach (Japan) N Tajima | 6 | 0 | [15]
(Australia) Je Delaney (Japan) Leo Vithoontien | 4 | 4
(Australia) C Puttergill (Australia) D Sweeny | 6 | 6
WC | (Australia) C Hewitt (Australia) L Hewitt
(Australia) Ja Delaney (Australia) L Tu | w/o
(Australia) B Bayldon (United Kingdom) B Walkin | 7^{7} | 6^{7} | [5]
4 | (United Kingdom) F Bass (New Zealand) A Rai | 6^{5} | 7^{9} | [10]
(Australia) Ethan Cook (United Kingdom) Emile Hudd | 6 | 6
Alt | (Japan) Takuya Kumasaka (India) K Singh | 1 | 2
(Japan) S Hazawa (Japan) T Ichikawa | 7 | 6
2 | (Australia) M Hulme (Australia) K Pearson | 5 | 4

Quarterfinals
1 | (India) A Chandrasekar (United States) R Stalder | 6 | 6
(Australia) J Charlton (Denmark) CE Overbeck | 4 | 4
3 | (Japan) M Imamura (Japan) R Matsuda | 7^{7} | 5 | [6]
(Australia) C Puttergill (Australia) D Sweeny | 6^{3} | 7 | [10]
(Australia) Ja Delaney (Australia) L Tu | 6 | 6
4 | (United Kingdom) F Bass (New Zealand) A Rai | 4 | 4
(Australia) E Cook (United Kingdom) E Hudd | 3 | 6 | [10]
(Japan) S Hazawa (Japan) T Ichikawa | 6 | 4 | [12]

Semifinals
1 | (India) A Chandrasekar (United States) R Stalder | 6 | 6
(Australia) C Puttergill (Australia) D Sweeny | 3 | 2
(Australia) Ja Delaney (Australia) L Tu | 6 | 6
(Japan) S Hazawa (Japan) T Ichikawa | 3 | 4

Final
1 | (India) A Chandrasekar (United States) R Stalder | 7^{7} | 5 | [8]
(Australia) Ja Delaney (Australia) L Tu | 6^{5} | 7 | [10]
