= NSW Open Challenger =

NSW Open
- 2025 NSW Open

Tournament information
- Event name: Perpetual NSW Open
- Location: Sydney, Australia
- Venue: NSW Tennis Centre, Sydney Olympic Park
- Website: website
ATP Tour
- Category: ATP Challenger Tour
- Draw: 32S/29Q/16D
- Prize money: $100,000 (2025), $50,000
WTA Tour
- Category: ITF Women's World Tennis Tour
- Draw: 32S/64Q/16D
- Prize money: $60,000

The Perpetual NSW Open is a tennis tournament held in Sydney, Australia, since 2006. The event is part of the ATP Challenger Tour and the ITF Women's Circuit, and is played on hardcourts.

== Past finals ==
=== Men's singles ===
Year	Champion	Runner-up	Score
2026	(United States) Sebastian Gorzny	(Australia) Omar Jasika	6–4, 6–3
2025	(Australia) James Duckworth	(Japan) Hayato Matsuoka	6–1, 6–4
2024	(Australia) Thanasi Kokkinakis	(Australia) Rinky Hijikata	6–1, 6–1
2023	(Japan) Taro Daniel	(Australia) Marc Polmans	6–2, 6–4
2022	(Chinese Taipei) Hsu Yu-hsiou	(Australia) Marc Polmans	6–4, 7–6^{(7–5)}
2014–21	not held		
2013	(Australia) Nick Kyrgios	(Australia) Matt Reid	6–3, 6–2

=== Men's doubles ===
Year	Champions	Runners-up	Score
2026	(Chinese Taipei) Jason Jung (New Zealand) Ajeet Rai	(Norway) Herman Høyeraal (Australia) Eric Padgham	6–2, 6–2
2025	(Australia) Rinky Hijikata (Australia) Marc Polmans	(Australia) Calum Puttergill (Australia) Dane Sweeny	6–0, 6–4
2024	(Australia) Blake Ellis (Australia) Thomas Fancutt	(Australia) Blake Bayldon (Netherlands) Mats Hermans	7–5, 7–6^{(7–4)}
2023	(United States) Ryan Seggerman (United States) Patrik Trhac	(Philippines) Ruben Gonzales (South Korea) Nam Ji-sung	6–4, 6–4
2022	(Australia) Blake Ellis (Australia) Tristan Schoolkate	(New Zealand) Ajeet Rai (Japan) Yuta Shimizu	4–6, 7–5, [11–9]
2014–21	not held		
2013	(Australia) Brydan Klein (Australia) Dane Propoggia	(Australia) Alex Bolt (Australia) Nick Kyrgios	6–4, 4–6, [11–9]

=== Women's singles ===
Year	Champion	Runner-up	Score
2025	(Australia) Talia Gibson	(Australia) Emerson Jones	6–2, 6–4
2024	(Australia) Emerson Jones	(Australia) Taylah Preston	6–4, 7–6^{(7–3)}
2023	(Australia) Destanee Aiava	(Australia) Astra Sharma	6–3, 6–4
2022	(Japan) Mai Hontama	(Australia) Petra Hule	7–6^{(7–1)}, 3–6, 7–5
2014–21	not held		
2013 (2)	(Australia) Viktorija Rajicic	(Australia) Jessica Moore	5–7, 6–3, 6–2
2013 (1)	(China) Wang Yafan	(Japan) Misa Eguchi	6–2, 6–0
2012	(Australia) Ashleigh Barty	(Australia) Olivia Rogowska	6–1, 6–3
2011	(Japan) Yurika Sema	(Japan) Rika Fujiwara	6–4, 5–7, 7–6^{(7–2)}
2010	(Australia) Jarmila Groth	(Japan) Yurika Sema	6–3, 6–3
2009	(China) Zhou Yimiao	(Japan) Yurika Sema	6–3, 6–4
2007–08	not held		
2006	(Slovakia) Jarmila Gajdošová	(Australia) Sophie Ferguson	6–4, 3–6, 7–6^{(7–3)}

=== Women's doubles ===
Year	Champions	Runners-up	Score
2025	(Japan) Hiromi Abe (Japan) Ikumi Yamazaki	(Australia) Petra Hule (Australia) Elena Micic	6–4, 6–4
2024	(Australia) Lizette Cabrera (Australia) Taylah Preston	(Australia) Destanee Aiava (Australia) Maddison Inglis	6–1, 3–6, [10–8]
2023	(Australia) Destanee Aiava (Australia) Maddison Inglis	(Japan) Kyōka Okamura (Japan) Ayano Shimizu	6–0, 6–0
2022	(Australia) Destanee Aiava (Australia) Lisa Mays	(Australia) Alexandra Osborne (Indonesia) Jessy Rompies	5–7, 6–3, [10–6]
2014–21	not held		
2013 (2)	(Australia) Alison Bai (Australia) Tyra Calderwood	(Australia) Anja Dokic (Australia) Jessica Moore	7–6^{(7–3)}, 6–4
2013 (1)	(Japan) Misa Eguchi (Japan) Mari Tanaka	(Serbia) Tamara Čurović (China) Wang Yafan	4–6, 7–5, [10–8]
2012	(Russia) Arina Rodionova (United Kingdom) Melanie South	(China) Duan Yingying (China) Han Xinyun	3–6, 6–3, [10–8]
2011	(Australia) Casey Dellacqua (Australia) Olivia Rogowska	(Japan) Rika Fujiwara (Japan) Kumiko Iijima	3–6, 7–6^{(7–3)}, [10–4]
2010	(Australia) Casey Dellacqua (Australia) Jessica Moore	(Australia) Sophie Ferguson (Australia) Trudi Musgrave	walkover
2009	(Australia) Monique Adamczak (South Africa) Lizaan du Plessis	(China) Han Xinyun (China) Ji Chunmei	6–3, 7–5
2007–08	not held		
2006	(Chinese Taipei) Chan Yung-jan (Chinese Taipei) Chuang Chia-jung	(Japan) Ayumi Morita (Japan) Junri Namigata	6–2, 6–1
