= Sakura Hosogi =

Japanese tennis player (born 2000)

Sakura Hosogi 細木咲良
- Country (sports): Japan
- Born: 25 March 2000 (age 26) Matsue, Shimane, Japan
- Height: 1.59 m (5 ft 3 in)
- Plays: Right (two-handed both sides)
- Prize money: $170,332

Singles
- Career record: 282–178
- Career titles: 8 ITF
- Highest ranking: No. 204 (27 February 2023)
- Current ranking: No. 348 (31 August 2026)

Grand Slam singles results
- French Open: Q1 (2023)

Doubles
- Career record: 90–98
- Career titles: 5 ITF
- Highest ranking: No. 259 (3 February 2025)
- Current ranking: No. 730 (31 August 2026)
- Last updated on: 10 September 2026.

Sakura Hosogi (細木 咲良, Hosogi Sakura; born 25 March 2000) is a Japanese tennis player. She has a career-high singles ranking of world No. 204 by the WTA, achieved on 27 February 2023, and a best doubles ranking of No. 259, reached on 3 February 2025.

== Career ==
Hosogi made her WTA Tour debut in Tokyo, as a lucky loser at the 2023 Pan Pacific Open but lost to qualifier Despina Papamichail in the first round.

== ITF Circuit finals ==
=== Singles: 22 (8 titles, 14 runner-ups) ===
Legend W40/50 tournaments (1–3) W25/35 tournaments (1–7) W15 tournaments (6–4)	Finals by surface Hard (8–12) Grass (0–1) Carpet (0–1)

Result	W–L	Date	Tournament	Tier	Surface	Opponent	Score
Loss	0–1	Jul 2018	ITF Hong Kong	W15	Hard	(Hong Kong) Eudice Chong	0–6, 6–4, 3–6
Win	1–1	Mar 2021	ITF Sharm El Sheikh, Egypt	W15	Hard	(Japan) Eri Hozumi	7–5, 6–2
Loss	1–2	May 2021	ITF Monastir, Tunisia	W15	Hard	(Japan) Himeno Sakatsume	4–6, 5–7
Loss	1–3	Jun 2021	ITF Monastir, Tunisia	W15	Hard	(Japan) Himeno Sakatsume	5–7, 5–7
Win	2–3	Mar 2022	ITF Monastir, Tunisia	W15	Hard	(France) Manon Léonard	6–3, 6–3
Win	3–3	Mar 2022	ITF Monastir, Tunisia	W15	Hard	(Germany) Emily Welker	3–6, 6–2, 6–1
Win	4–3	Apr 2022	ITF Monastir, Tunisia	W15	Hard	(Chinese Taipei) Joanna Garland	6–4, 1–6, 6–3
Loss	4–4	May 2022	ITF Monastir, Tunisia	W25	Hard	(Hong Kong) Adithya Karunaratne	3–6, 3–6
Loss	4–5	Jan 2023	ITF Monastir, Tunisia	W40	Hard	Maria Timofeeva	5–7, 4–6
Win	5–5	Jan 2023	ITF Monastir, Tunisia	W40	Hard	Yuliya Hatouka	7–6^{(8)}, 6–4
Loss	5–6	Jan 2023	ITF Monastir, Tunisia	W25	Hard	(Serbia) Lola Radivojević	1–6, 5–7
Loss	5–7	Jun 2023	ITF Madrid, Spain	W25	Hard	(United States) Makenna Jones	2–6, 3–6
Win	6–7	Nov 2024	ITF Monastir, Tunisia	W15	Hard	Arina Bulatova	6–2, 6–0
Loss	6–8	Nov 2024	ITF Monastir, Tunisia	W15	Hard	(France) Mathilde Lollia	2–6, 2–6
Win	7–8	Nov 2024	ITF Monastir, Tunisia	W15	Hard	(France) Alyssa Réguer	6–0, 6–2
Loss	7–9	Feb 2025	Launceston International, Australia	W35	Hard	(Australia) Lizette Cabrera	5–7, 2–6
Loss	7–10	Mar 2025	ITF Swan Hill, Australia	W35	Grass	(Australia) Lizette Cabrera	4–6, 3–6
Loss	7–11	Jul 2025	ITF Monastir, Tunisia	W35	Hard	Anastasia Gasanova	2–6, 6–3, 4–6
Win	8–11	Jul 2025	ITF Monastir, Tunisia	W35	Hard	(South Korea) Ku Yeon-woo	6–3, 6–3
Loss	8–12	Jun 2026	ITF Taipei, Taiwan	W35	Hard	(Indonesia) Priska Madelyn Nugroho	6–7^{(6)}, 3–6
Loss	8–13	Jul 2026	ITF Columbus, United States	W50	Hard (i)	(United States) Julieta Pareja	3–6, 3–6
Loss	8–14	Sep 2026	ITF Nanao, Japan	W50	Carpet	(Japan) Hiromi Abe	4–6, 3–6

=== Doubles: 7 (5 titles, 2 runner-ups) ===
Legend W75 tournaments (1–0) W25/35 tournaments (3–2) W15 tournaments (1–0)	Finals by surface Hard (4–2) Grass (1–0)

Result	W–L	Date	Tournament	Tier	Surface	Partner	Opponents	Score
Win	1–0	Jun 2021	ITF Monastir, Tunisia	W15	Hard	(Japan) Himeno Sakatsume	(United States) Emma Davis (United States) Lauren Proctor	7–5, 2–6, [10–8]
Win	2–0	Nov 2021	ITF Milovice, Czech Republic	W25	Hard	(Japan) Misaki Matsuda	(Poland) Maja Chwalińska (Czech Republic) Linda Nosková	3–6, 6–2, [10–8]
Win	3–0	Mar 2024	ITF Swan Hill, Australia	W35	Grass	(Japan) Misaki Matsuda	(New Zealand) Monique Barry (Australia) Alana Parnaby	6–2, 6–2
Loss	3–1	Jul 2024	ITF Tianjin, China	W35	Hard	(Japan) Misaki Matsuda	(China) Guo Meiqi (China) Xiao Zhenghua	4–6, 2–6
Win	4–1	Aug 2024	ITF Vigo, Spain	W35	Hard	(Japan) Misaki Matsuda	(Spain) Eva Alvarez Sande (United States) Maxine Murphy	6–0, 3–6, [10–6]
Win	5–1	Sep 2024	Perth International, Australia	W75	Hard	(Japan) Misaki Matsuda	(United Kingdom) Naiktha Bains (India) Ankita Raina	walkover
Loss	5–2	Aug 2025	ITF Nakhon Pathom, Thailand	W35	Hard	(Japan) Misaki Matsuda	(Thailand) Patcharin Cheapchandej (Thailand) Peangtarn Plipuech	3–6, 1–6
