= Misaki Matsuda =

Japanese tennis player (born 1998)

Misaki Matsuda 松田 美咲
- Country (sports): Japan
- Born: 21 August 1998 (age 27) Saitama, Japan
- Plays: Right (two-handed backhand)
- Prize money: $109,661

Singles
- Career record: 231–144
- Career titles: 1 ITF
- Highest ranking: No. 254 (3 April 2023)
- Current ranking: No. 415 (10 August 2026)

Doubles
- Career record: 146–95
- Career titles: 11 ITF
- Highest ranking: No. 210 (21 November 2022)
- Current ranking: No. 280 (10 August 2026)
- Last updated on: 16 August 2026.

Misaki Matsuda (松田 美咲, Matsuda Misaki; born 21 August 1998) is a Japanese tennis player.

Matsuda has a career-high singles ranking by the WTA of 254, achieved on 3 April 2023, and a best doubles ranking of world No. 210, reached on 21 November 2022.

Matsuda won her first bigger title at the W75 Perth Tennis International, Australia in the doubles draw.

== ITF Circuit finals ==
=== Singles: 8 (1 title, 7 runner-ups) ===
Legend W50 tournaments W25/35 tournaments W15 tournaments	Finals by surface Hard (1–4) Clay (0–2) Grass (0–1)

Result	W–L	Date	Tournament	Tier	Surface	Opponent	Score
Loss	0–1	Nov 2018	ITF Nonthaburi, Thailand	W15	Hard	(Thailand) Nudnida Luangnam	6–7^{(3)}, 6–2, 2–6
Loss	0–2	Jun 2019	ITF Gimcheon, South Korea	W15	Hard	(South Korea) Lee Eun-hye	3–6, 3–6
Loss	0–3	Mar 2020	ITF Mildura, Australia	W25	Grass	(Ukraine) Marianna Zakarlyuk	6–7^{(2)}, 1–6
Loss	0–4	Sep 2022	ITF Jablonec nad Nisou, Czech Republic	W25	Clay	(Spain) Leyre Romero Gormaz	1–6, 6–7^{(1)}
Loss	0–5	Oct 2022	ITF Santa Margherita di Pula, Italy	W25	Clay	(Spain) Carlota Martínez Círez	5–7, 5–7
Win	1–5	Mar 2023	ITF Bengaluru, India	W25	Hard	(Japan) Misaki Doi	7–5, 4–6, 7–6^{(6)}
Loss	1–6	Aug 2024	ITF Vigo, Spain	W35	Hard	(France) Tessah Andrianjafitrimo	4–6, 3–6
Loss	1–7	Aug 2025	ITF Nakhon Pathom, Thailand	W15	Hard	(Thailand) Patcharin Cheapchandej	3–6, 6–7^{(4)}

=== Doubles: 30 (11 titles, 19 runner-ups) ===
Legend W100 tournaments W60/75 tournaments W40/50 tournaments W25/35 tournaments W15 tournaments	Finals by surface Hard (5–15) Clay (5–4) Grass (1–0)

Result	W–L	Date	Tournament	Tier	Surface	Partner	Opponents	Score
Loss	0–1	Oct 2019	ITF Toowoomba, Australia	W25	Hard	(Japan) Haruna Arakawa	(Australia) Abbie Myers (Australia) Belinda Woolcock	6–7^{(2)}, 3–6
Win	1–1	Apr 2021	ITF Antalya, Turkey	W15	Clay	(South Korea) Lee So-ra	(Czech Republic) Lucie Havlíčková (Czech Republic) Miriam Škoch	6–2, 6–3
Loss	1–2	Apr 2021	ITF Antalya, Turkey	W15	Clay	(South Korea) Lee So-ra	(Israel) Shavit Kimchi (Hungary) Adrienn Nagy	7–5, 2–6, [8–10]
Loss	1–3	Apr 2021	ITF Antalya, Turkey	W15	Clay	(South Korea) Lee So-ra	(Australia) Olivia Gadecki (Burundi) Sada Nahimana	3–6, 6–1, [9–11]
Win	2–3	Nov 2021	ITF Milovice, Czech Republic	W25	Hard	(Japan) Sakura Hosogi	(Poland) Maja Chwalińska (Czech Republic) Linda Nosková	3–6, 6–2, [10–8]
Loss	2–4	Dec 2021	ITF Pune, India	W25	Hard	(Japan) Funa Kozaki	(Kazakhstan) Anna Danilina (Ukraine) Valeriya Strakhova	0–6, 6–2, [5–10]
Win	3–4	Apr 2022	ITF Antalya, Turkey	W15	Clay	(Japan) Riko Sawayanagi	(Japan) Rina Saigo (Japan) Yukina Saigo	7–6^{(1)}, 6–2
Win	4–4	May 2022	ITF Antalya, Turkey	W15	Clay	(Russia) Ksenia Laskutova	(Japan) Rina Saigo (Japan) Yukina Saigo	7–5, 6–4
Loss	4–5	May 2022	ITF Chiang Rai, Thailand	W25	Hard	(Japan) Naho Sato	(Japan) Momoko Kobori (Thailand) Luksika Kumkhum	3–6, 3–6
Loss	4–6	Jun 2022	ITF Gurugram, India	W25	Hard	(Japan) Momoko Kobori	(Japan) Saki Imamura (Indonesia) Priska Madelyn Nugroho	4–6, 5–7
Loss	4–7	Jul 2022	ITF Gurugram, India	W25	Hard	(Japan) Momoko Kobori	(India) Ankita Raina (Indonesia) Priska Madelyn Nugroho	6–3, 0–6, [6–10]
Win	5–7	Aug 2022	ITF Eupen, Belgium	W25	Clay	(Czech Republic) Aneta Kučmová	(Chile) Fernanda Labraña (Italy) Anna Turati	7–6^{(5)}, 6–3
Loss	5–8	Aug 2022	Přerov Cup, Czech Republic	W60	Clay	(Japan) Funa Kozaki	(Czech Republic) Anastasia Dețiuc (Czech Republic) Miriam Škoch	6–7^{(4)}, 6–4, [5–10]
Loss	5–9	Sep 2022	ITF Frýdek-Místek, Czech Republic	W25	Clay	(Japan) Funa Kozaki	(Czech Republic) Dominika Šalková (Czech Republic) Miriam Škoch	2–6, 3–6
Win	6–9	Apr 2023	ITF Pula, Italy	W25	Clay	(Japan) Ikumi Yamazaki	(Canada) Bianca Fernandez (United States) Chiara Scholl	4–6, 6–2, [11–9]
Loss	6–10	Sep 2023	ITF Nakhon Si Thammarat, Thailand	W25	Hard	(Japan) Naho Sato	(Thailand) Punnin Kovapitukted (China) Tang Qianhui	6–7^{(2)}, 6–1, [3–10]
Loss	6–11	Sep 2023	ITF Perth, Australia	W25	Hard	(Japan) Naho Sato	(Australia) Destanee Aiava (Australia) Maddison Inglis	1–6, 4–6
Loss	6–12	Dec 2023	ITF Solapur, India	W25	Hard	(Japan) Funa Kozaki	(Japan) Hiromi Abe (Japan) Saki Imamura	3–6, 1–6
Loss	6–13	Dec 2023	ITF Navi Mumbai, India	W40	Hard	(Japan) Funa Kozaki	(Latvia) Kamilla Bartone; Ekaterina Makarova	3–6, 6–1, [7–10]
Win	7–13	Mar 2024	ITF Swan Hill, Australia	W35	Grass	(Japan) Sakura Hosogi	(New Zealand) Monique Barry (Australia) Alana Parnaby	6–2, 6–2
Loss	7–14	Jun 2024	ITF Taipei, Taiwan	W35	Hard	(Japan) Funa Kozaki	(Japan) Eri Shimizu (Japan) Ikumi Yamazaki	6–4, 1–6, [5–10]
Loss	7–15	Jul 2024	ITF Tianjin, China	W35	Hard	(Japan) Sakura Hosogi	(China) Guo Meiqi (China) Xiao Zhenghua	4–6, 2–6
Win	8–15	Aug 2024	ITF Vigo, Spain	W35	Hard	(Japan) Sakura Hosogi	(Spain) Eva Alvarez Sande (United States) Maxine Murphy	6–0, 3–6, [10–6]
Win	9–15	Sep 2024	Perth International, Australia	W75	Hard	(Japan) Sakura Hosogi	(United Kingdom) Naiktha Bains (India) Ankita Raina	walkover
Loss	9–16	Aug 2025	ITF Monastir, Tunisia	W35	Hard	(Japan) Sakura Hosogi	(South Korea) Back Da-yeon (South Korea) Ku Yeon-woo	3–6, 3–6
Loss	9–17	Aug 2025	ITF Nakhon Pathom, Thailand	W35	Hard	(Japan) Sakura Hosogi	(Thailand) Patcharin Cheapchandej (Thailand) Peangtarn Plipuech	3–6, 1–6
Loss	9–18	Feb 2026	ITF Pune, India	W75	Hard	(Japan) Eri Shimizu	(India) Shrivalli Bhamidipaty (India) Ankita Raina	6–7^{(3)}, 3–6
Win	10–18	Feb 2026	ITF Bengaluru Open, India	W100	Hard	(Japan) Eri Shimizu	(Indonesia) Priska Madelyn Nugroho (India) Ankita Raina	6–4, 3–6, [10–5]
Win	11–18	Apr 2026	ITF Osaka, Japan	W35	Hard	(Japan) Ikumi Yamazaki	(Japan) Ayumi Miyamoto (Japan) Himari Satō	7–5, 6–2
Loss	11–19	Apr 2026	ITF Miyazaki, Japan	W35	Hard	(Japan) Eri Shimizu	(Japan) Anri Nagata (Japan) Naho Sato	4–6, 6–7^{(2)}
