= Sebastian Gorzny =

American tennis player (born 2004)

- Country (sports): United States
- Born: 24 January 2004 (age 22) Fountain Valley, California, US
- Height: 6 ft 4 in (1.93 m)
- Plays: Right-handed (one-handed backhand)
- College: University of Texas
- Prize money: US $232,004

Singles
- Career record: 1–2
- Career titles: 0
- Highest ranking: No. 406 (October 19, 2026)
- Current ranking: No. 406 (October 19, 2026)

Grand Slam singles results
- US Open: 2R (2026)

Doubles
- Career record: 0–1
- Career titles: 0
- Highest ranking: No. 915 (October 21, 2024)
- Current ranking: No. 1,096 (October 19, 2026)

Grand Slam doubles results
- US Open: 1R (2022)
- Last updated on: October 19, 2026.

Sebastian Gorzny (born January 24, 2004) is an American tennis player. He has a career-high singles ranking of No. 406 achieved on October 19, 2026 and a doubles ranking of No. 915 achieved on October 21, 2024. Gorzny won the 2022 Wimbledon Championships – Boys' doubles title.

He has a career-high ITF junior combined ranking of No. 38 achieved on 17 January 2022.

== College ==
Gorzny graduated from the University of Texas where he played college tennis after having played for Texas Christian University’s National Championship team in 2023-2024. He finished 2026 ranked second in the final ITA singles rankings, and was named ITA National Senior Player of the Year. With the Texas Longhorns he reached the NCAA final before graduating. In June, he won the USTA American Collegiate Player Wildcard Playoff.

== Career ==
At the 2026 US Open Gorzny was awarded a wildcard for his Grand Slam singles main draw debut. He won his first round match in 5 sets (3-6 6-3 3-6 6-3 7-6^{[11-9]}) over Belgian Raphael Collignon, saving 5 match points. In the second round Gornzy would face former US Open champion and former world number one. Daniil Medvedev. Gornzy would lose in straight sets 6-1 6-3 7-5.

== Personal life ==
At the 2019 USTA under-16 nationals in Kalamazoo, Michigan, Gorzny collapsed on court during his match. Later that night in his hotel Gorzny suffered a major seizure in his sleep. At the hospital Gorzny was placed in a medically induced coma for four days. Doctors gave him just a 5% chance to survive as they discovered a mosquito bite left him with an infection in his brain. With consent of his parents doctors removed his breathing tubes to see if Gorzny would continue breathing on his own. After a long recovery he miraculously made it back onto the tennis court.

== Performance timeline ==
Key
W	F	SF	QF	#R	RR	Q#	DNQ	A	NH

(W) winner; (F) finalist; (SF) semifinalist; (QF) quarterfinalist; (#R) rounds 4, 3, 2, 1; (RR) round-robin stage; (Q#) qualification round; (DNQ) did not qualify; (A) absent; (NH) not held; (SR) strike rate (events won / competed); (W–L) win–loss record.

=== Singles ===
Tournament	2026	SR	W–L	Win%
Grand Slams
Australian Open	A	0 / 0	0–0	–
French Open	A	0 / 0	0–0	–
Wimbledon	A	0 / 0	0–0	–
US Open	2R	0 / 0	0–0	–
Win–loss	0–0	0 / 0	0–0	–

== Junior Grand Slam finals ==
=== Doubles: 1 (title) ===
Result	Year	Tournament	Surface	Partner	Opponents	Score
Win	2022	Wimbledon	Grass	(United States) Alex Michelsen	(France) Gabriel Debru (France) Paul Inchauspé	7–6^{(7–5)}, 6–3
