= Ikumi Yamazaki =

Japanese tennis player (born 2001)

Ikumi Yamazaki 山崎 郁美
- Country (sports): Japan
- Born: 24 August 2001 (age 25) Chiba, Japan
- Plays: Right (two-handed backhand)
- Prize money: $79,629

Singles
- Career record: 151–113
- Career titles: 4 ITF
- Highest ranking: No. 348 (8 September 2025)
- Current ranking: No. 638 (19 October 2026)

Doubles
- Career record: 85–60
- Career titles: 11 ITF
- Highest ranking: No. 222 (2 February 2026)
- Current ranking: No. 266 (19 October 2026)
- Last updated on: 25 October 2026.

Ikumi Yamazaki (山崎 郁美, Yamazaki Ikumi; born 24 August 2001) is a Japanese tennis player.

Born in Chiba city, Yamazaki represented Japan at the World University Games held in China in 2021 and won bronze medals in women's team and doubles.

In February 2025, she won the first bigger championship at the W50 tournament held in Ahmedabad, India. However in November, partnering Hiromi Abe, she won the title at the W75 NSW Open Challenger in Sydney, Australia.

== ITF Circuit finals ==
=== Singles: 6 (4 titles, 2 runner-ups) ===
Legend W75 tournaments W50 tournaments W25/35 tournaments W15 tournaments	Finals by surface Hard (2–0) Clay (1–1) Grass (1–0) Carpet (0–1)

Result	W–L	Date	Tournament	Tier	Surface	Opponent	Score
Win	1–0	Oct 2022	ITF Makinohara, Japan	W25	Grass	(Japan) Hayu Kinoshita	7–5, 6–4
Loss	1–1	Oct 2022	ITF Hamamatsu, Japan	W25	Carpet	(Japan) Haruka Kaji	1–1 ret.
Loss	1–2	Apr 2024	ITF Hammamet, Tunisia	W35	Clay	(Belgium) Hanne Vandewinkel	1–6, 1–6
Win	2–2	Jun 2025	ITF Hong Kong	W15	Hard	(China) Tian Fangran	6–4, 2–6, 6–1
Win	3–2	Aug 2025	ITF Koksijde, Belgium	W50+H	Clay	(Netherlands) Anouk Koevermans	6–1, 6–4
Win	4–2	Jun 2026	ITF Tokyo, Japan	W15	Hard	(Japan) Hikaru Sato	7–6^{(4)}, 2–6, 6–2

=== Doubles: 18 (13 titles, 5 runner-ups) ===
Legend W75 tournaments W50 tournaments W25/35 tournaments W15 tournaments	Finals by surface Hard (8–2) Clay (4–2) Carpet (1–1)

Result	W–L	Date	Tournament	Tier	Surface	Partner	Opponents	Score
Win	1–0	Oct 2022	ITF Nanao, Japan	W25	Carpet	(Japan) Funa Kozaki	(Japan) Aoi Ito (Japan) Rinon Okuwaki	3–6, 7–6^{(5)}, [10–5]
Win	2–0	Apr 2023	ITF Santa Margherita di Pula, Italy	W25	Clay	(Japan) Misaki Matsuda	(Canada) Bianca Fernandez (United States) Chiara Scholl	4–6, 6–2, [11–9]
Win	3–0	Apr 2024	ITF Hammamet, Tunisia	W35	Clay	(Spain) Kaitlin Quevedo	(Colombia) María Herazo González (France) Yasmine Mansouri	6–3, 7–6^{(5)}
Win	4–0	Jun 2024	ITF Taipei, Taiwan	W35	Hard	(Japan) Eri Shimizu	(Japan) Funa Kozaki (Japan) Misaki Matsuda	4–6, 6–1, [10–5]
Loss	4–1	Aug 2024	ITF Mohammedia, Morocco	W35	Clay	(Japan) Funa Kozaki	Ekaterina Kazionova (Republic of Ireland) Celine Simunyu	3–6, 3–6
Loss	4–2	Aug 2024	ITF Braunschweig, Germany	W35	Clay	(France) Sarah Iliev	(Japan) Funa Kozaki (Japan) Erika Sema	3–6, 6–7^{(9)}
Win	5–2	Sep 2024	ITF Kyoto, Japan	W35	Hard	(Japan) Anri Nagata	(Japan) Hayu Kinoshita (Japan) Yukina Saigo	6–4, 7–5
Win	6–2	Feb 2025	ITF Ahmedabad, India	W50	Hard	(Japan) Akiko Omae	(India) Vaishnavi Adkar (India) Ankita Raina	6–2, 2–6, [10–7]
Win	7–2	Mar 2025	ITF Santa Margherita di Pula, Italy	W35	Clay	(Japan) Hikaru Sato	(Italy) Jessica Pieri (Italy) Tatiana Pieri	7–5, 2–6, [10–4]
Win	8–2	Apr 2025	ITF Santa Margherita di Pula, Italy	W35	Clay	(Japan) Hikaru Sato	(Germany) Katharina Hobgarski (Germany) Antonia Schmidt	7–6^{(4)}, 1–6, [12–10]
Loss	8–3	May 2025	ITF Goyang, South Korea	W35	Hard	(Japan) Hiromi Abe	(China) Feng Shuo (China) Li Zongyu	2–6, 5–7
Win	9–3	May 2025	ITF Changwon, South Korea	W35	Hard	(Japan) Hiromi Abe	(Chinese Taipei) Lee Ya-hsin (Hong Kong) Cody Wong	6–4, 6–2
Loss	9–4	Jun 2025	ITF Luzhou, China	W35	Hard	(Japan) Saki Imamura	(Indonesia) Priska Madelyn Nugroho (Indonesia) Janice Tjen	4–6, 3–6
Win	10–4	Nov 2025	Sydney Challenger, Australia	W75	Hard	(Japan) Hiromi Abe	(Australia) Petra Hule (Australia) Elena Micic	6–4, 6–4
Win	11–4	Apr 2026	ITF Osaka, Japan	W35	Hard	(Japan) Misaki Matsuda	(Japan) Ayumi Miyamoto (Japan) Himari Satō	7–5, 6–2
Loss	11–5	Sep 2026	ITF Nanao, Japan	W50	Carpet	(Japan) Hiromi Abe	(Japan) Ayumi Miyamoto (Japan) Kisa Yoshioka	6–2, 4–6, [13–15]
Win	12–5	Oct 2026	ITF Sydney, Australia	W35	Hard	(South Korea) Back Da-yeon	(Japan) Hikaru Sato (New Zealand) Elyse Tse	2–6, 6–4, [10–5]
Win	13–5	Nov 2026	ITF Ma'anshan, China	W15	Hard (i)	Alina Tikhonova	(China) Chen Yiru (China) Tang Xiao	7–6^{(2)}, 6–3
