= Petra Hule =

Australian tennis player (born 1999)

- Country (sports): Australia
- Born: 5 March 1999 (age 27) Adelaide, Australia
- Plays: Right-handed
- College: Florida State
- Prize money: $184,047

Singles
- Career record: 104–100
- Career titles: 0
- Highest ranking: No. 287 (18 November 2024)
- Current ranking: No. 1,510 (28 September 2026)

Grand Slam singles results
- Australian Open: Q1 (2023, 2024, 2025)

Doubles
- Career record: 119–65
- Career titles: 1 WTA 125, 12 ITF
- Highest ranking: No. 119 (9 June 2025)
- Current ranking: No. 409 (28 September 2026)

Grand Slam doubles results
- Australian Open: 1R (2023, 2025)
- Last updated on: 29 September 2026.

Petra Hule (born 5 March 1999) is an Australian tennis player.

Hule has a career-high singles ranking by the WTA of 287, which she reached on 18 November 2024. She also has a career-high WTA doubles ranking of 121, achieved on 26 May 2025.

Hule made her Grand Slam tournament main-draw debut at the 2023 Australian Open in the doubles tournament, partnering Arina Rodionova. She played college tennis at Florida State University.

Partnering Jaimee Fourlis, Hule won her first WTA 125 doubles title at the Canberra Tennis International, defeating Darja Semeņistaja and Nina Stojanović in the final.

== WTA 125 finals ==
=== Doubles: 1 (title) ===
Result	W–L	Date	Tournament	Surface	Partner	Opponents	Score
Win	1–0	Jan 2025	Canberra International, Australia	Hard	(Australia) Jaimee Fourlis	(Latvia) Darja Semeņistaja (Serbia) Nina Stojanović	7–5, 4–6, [10–6]

== ITF Circuit finals ==
=== Singles: 2 (2 runner-ups) ===
Legend W60 tournaments W35 tournaments	Finals by surface Hard (0–2)

Result	W–L	Date	Tournament	Tier	Surface	Opponent	Score
Loss	0–1	Nov 2022	Sydney Open, Australia	W60	Hard	(Japan) Mai Hontama	1–6, 6–3, 5–7
Loss	0–2	May 2024	ITF Changwon, South Korea	W35	Hard	(United States) Hanna Chang	4–6, 4–6

=== Doubles: 20 (12 titles, 8 runner-ups) ===
Legend W100 tournaments W75 tournaments W50 tournaments W25/35 tournaments	Finals by surface Hard (9–5) Clay (3–2) Grass (0–1)

Result	W–L	Date	Tournament	Tier	Surface	Partner	Opponents	Score
Win	1–0	Sep 2022	ITF Darwin, Australia	W25	Hard	(Australia) Talia Gibson	(Australia) Lisa Mays (Japan) Ramu Ueda	2–6, 7–5, [10–5]
Win	2–0	Oct 2022	ITF Cairns, Australia	W25	Hard	(Australia) Talia Gibson	(Australia) Alana Parnaby (Australia) Taylah Preston	6–1, 6–4
Loss	2–1	Mar 2023	ITF Swan Hill, Australia	W25	Grass	(Australia) Olivia Gadecki	(Australia) Elysia Bolton (Australia) Alexandra Bozovic	6–7^{(3)}, 6–2, [7–10]
Win	3–1	Apr 2023	ITF Osaka, Japan	W25	Hard	(Australia) Alexandra Bozovic	(Chinese Taipei) Lee Pei-chi (Chinese Taipei) Lee Ya-hsuan	6–2, 6–3
Loss	3–2	Jun 2023	ITF Setubal, Portugal	W25	Hard	(Australia) Gabriella Da Silva-Fick	(Australia) Elysia Bolton (Australia) Alexandra Bozovic	7–6^{(6)}, 6–7^{(3)}, [8–10]
Win	4–2	Jun 2023	ITF Guimaraes, Portugal	W25	Hard	(Spain) Georgina García Pérez	(Portugal) Francisca Jorge (Portugal) Matilde Jorge	6–4, 7–5
Win	5–2	Jun 2023	ITF Corroios, Portugal	W25	Hard	(Australia) Talia Gibson	(Belgium) Sofia Costoulas (Switzerland) Lulu Sun	6–3, 3–6, [10–6]
Loss	5–3	Aug 2023	ITF Ottershaw, United Kingdom	W25	Hard	(Australia) Talia Gibson	(Australia) Destanee Aiava (India) Rutuja Bhosale	2–6, 3–6
Loss	5–4	Aug 2023	ITF Roehampton, United KingdomK	W25	Hard	(Australia) Talia Gibson	(Georgia (country)) Mariam Bolkvadze (United Kingdom) Lily Miyazaki	5–7, 3–6
Loss	5–5	Jun 2024	ITF Gdańsk, Poland	W35	Clay	(Australia) Jaimee Fourlis	(Czech Republic) Karolína Kubáňová (Czech Republic) Renata Voráčová	6–3, 6–7^{(5)}, [7–10]
Win	6–5	Jul 2024	ITF The Hague, Netherlands	W75	Clay	(Australia) Jaimee Fourlis	(Netherlands) Annelin Bakker (Netherlands) Sarah van Emst	6–4, 6–2
Win	7–5	Jul 2024	ITF Darmstadt, Germany	W35	Clay	(Australia) Jaimee Fourlis	(Czech Republic) Karolína Kubáňová (Greece) Sapfo Sakellaridi	6–4, 6–2
Win	8–5	Sep 2024	ITF Cairns, Australia	W35	Hard	(Australia) Alana Parnaby	(United States) Mia Horvit (Australia) Tenika McGiffin	6–2, 6–2
Win	9–5	Oct 2024	ITF Cairns, Australia	W35	Hard	(Australia) Alana Parnaby	(Australia) Destanee Aiava (Australia) Alexandra Bozovic	3–6, 6–2, [10–2]
Win	10–5	Oct 2024	Playford International, Australia	W75	Hard	(Australia) Alexandra Bozovic	(Australia) Lizette Cabrera (Australia) Taylah Preston	6–4, 6–3
Win	11–5	Jan 2025	Queensland International, Australia	W75	Hard	(Australia) Elena Micic	(Australia) Lizette Cabrera (Australia) Taylah Preston	2–6, 6–2, [10–6]
Loss	11–6	Apr 2025	Charlottesville Open, United States	W100	Hard	(Canada) Kayla Cross	Maria Kozyreva; Iryna Shymanovich	5–7, 5–7
Win	12–6	May 2025	ITF Pelham, United States	W50	Clay	(United Kingdom) Madeleine Brooks	(Spain) Alicia Herrero Liñana (United States) Anna Rogers	6–1, 7–6^{(4)}
Loss	12–7	Nov 2025	Sydney Open, Australia	W75	Hard	(Australia) Elena Micic	(Japan) Hiromi Abe (Japan) Ikumi Yamazaki	4–6, 4–6
Loss	12–8	Feb 2026	Brisbane QTC International, Australia	W75	Hard	(Australia) Elena Micic	(Japan) Hayu Kinoshita (China) Zhang Ying	6–7^{(5)}, 5–7
