= Emerson Jones =

Australian tennis player (born 2008)

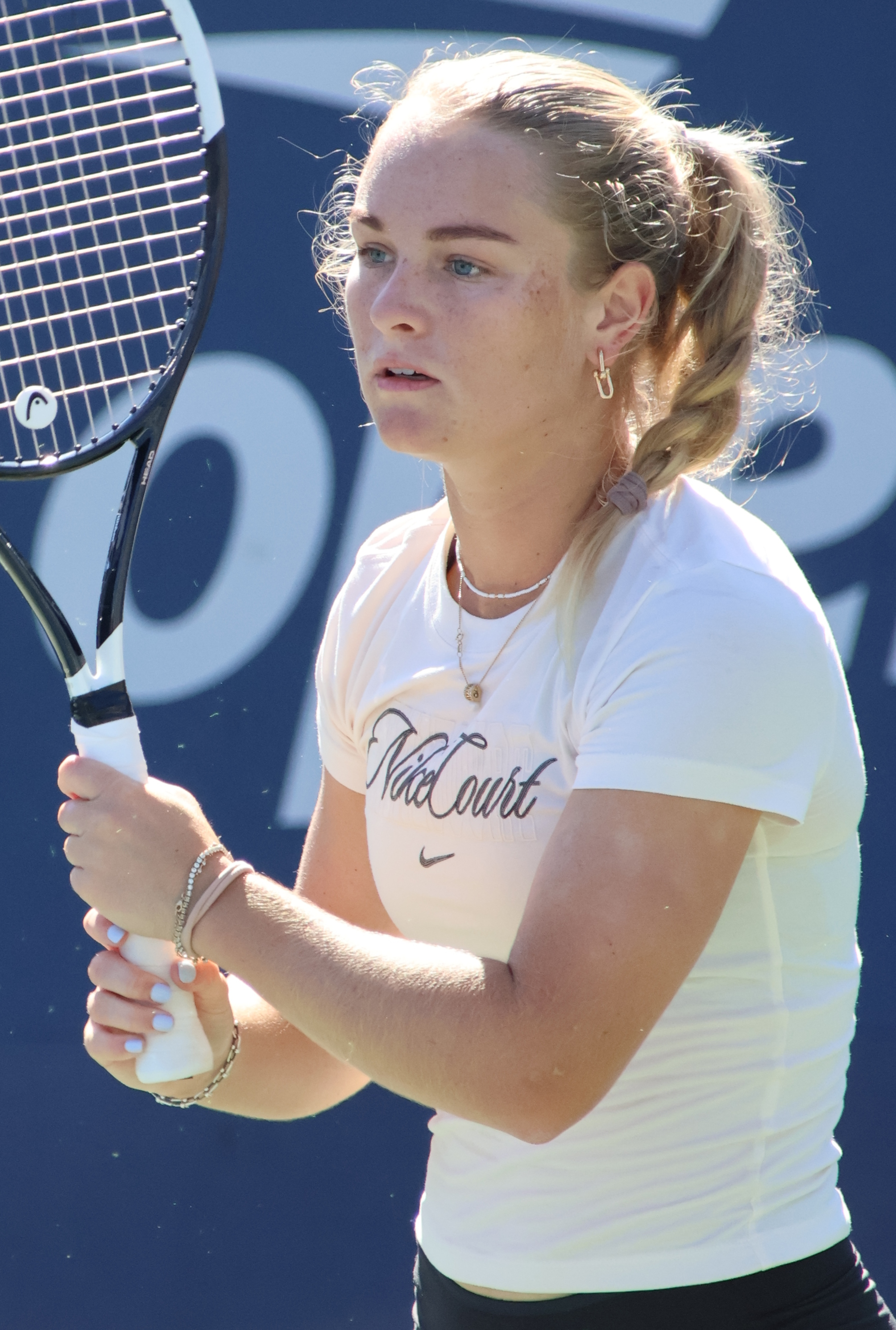
- Jones at the 2026 US Open
- Country (sports): Australia
- Residence: Gold Coast, Queensland, Australia
- Born: 7 July 2008 (age 18) Gold Coast, Queensland
- Height: 1.63 m (5 ft 4 in)
- Turned pro: 2023
- Plays: Right (two-handed backhand)
- Coach: Antonio Van Grichen
- Prize money: $746,807

Singles
- Career record: 103–60
- Career titles: 4 ITF
- Highest ranking: No. 122 (12 October 2026)
- Current ranking: No. 133 (16 November 2026)

Grand Slam singles results
- Australian Open: 1R (2025, 2026)
- French Open: 1R (2026)
- Wimbledon: Q3 (2025)
- US Open: Q3 (2025)

Doubles
- Career record: 10–14
- Highest ranking: No. 657 (2 November 2026)
- Current ranking: No. 664 (16 November 2026)

Grand Slam doubles results
- Australian Open: 1R (2026)

Grand Slam mixed doubles results
- Australian Open: 1R (2025)
- Last updated on: 12 October 2026.

Emerson Jones (born 7 July 2008) is an Australian tennis player. She has a career-high singles ranking by the WTA of No. 122, achieved on 12 October 2026, and a best doubles ranking of No. 657.

Jones reached a combined junior ranking of world No. 1 on 9 September 2024, becoming the first Australian junior to reach the top spot since Jelena Dokic in 1998.

== Early life ==
Jones was born and raised on the Gold Coast, Queensland, where she attended Coomera Anglican College. She began playing tennis at four years of age at the Coomera Waters Recreation Club on the Gold Coast. Her mother, Loretta Harrop, is an Olympic silver medallist triathlete and her father, Brad Jones, is a former Australian Rules footballer who won the 1999 Grogan Medal in the Queensland State League, and narrowly missed out on a professional AFL career when he trialled with the Brisbane Bears in 1994. Her brother, Hayden, is also a tennis player who was ranked inside the top 10 of the ITF juniors.

== Career ==
=== Juniors ===
Jones began playing junior tournaments in August 2021 a few weeks after her 13th birthday when she was given a wildcard entry into a J5 event in her hometown of the Gold Coast in August 2021. She recorded several wins and reached the quarterfinals in her first ITF junior tournament.

Jones made her junior major debut at 13 years of age at the 2022 Australian Open when she was given a main-draw wildcard and defeated Cara Korhonen 6–0, 6–1 in the first round, before being eliminated in the second round. In August 2022, she won her first ITF tournament at the JB2 Sydney event and followed it up with a second title the following week at the J2 Sydney tournament. Her 2023 season included appearances in all four junior Grand Slam tournaments as well as two J300 and one J500 titles in the United States, Korea and Japan which allowed her to rise up the rankings and claim a top 10 spot leading into 2024.

She entered the 2024 season ranked inside the top 10 and started by winning the J300 Traralgon tournament. The following week she entered the Australian Open as the sixth seed and reached her first junior major final at 15 years of age. She was defeated by Renáta Jamrichová in the final.

On 27 May 2024, Jones reached a career-high ITF junior combined ranking of No. 2, becoming the highest ranked Australian junior since Ashleigh Barty in 2011. She bettered her junior ranking to No. 1 at 16 years of age on 9 September 2024 and became the first Australian female to do since Jelena Dokic in 1998.

At the 2024 French Open, Jones was upset in the first round by qualifier Daria Shchadneva.

=== 2023–24: Professional and WTA Tour debut ===
At the age of 14, Jones made her professional debut when she received a wildcard into the qualifying draw of the Hobart International in January 2023, but lost in the first round to Tereza Martincová. She qualified for her first professional tournament the following month at the $25k event in Swan Hill. In July 2023, she reached her first ITF final at the $15k event in Caloundra but lost to third seed Melisa Ercan.

Jones began her 2024 season with a wildcard entry into the main draw of the Canberra International, losing in the first round to sixth seed Wang Yafan. She received a wildcard entry into the qualifying draw of the Australian Open, but lost in the first round to Priscilla Hon. The following month, Jones received a wildcard entry into the Burnie International II, where she defeated Tina Nadine Smith in the first round, before losing to fifth seed Wei Sijia in the second. In March 2024, she reached her second ITF final at the $35k event in Swan Hill but lost to Gabriella Da Silva-Fick. Still only 16, Jones won her biggest title to date in November 2024, claiming the W75 Sydney Challenger by defeating fellow Australian teenager Taylah Preston, ranked world No. 162 at the time, in straight sets in the final.

=== 2025: First WTA Tour win, top 300 and major debut ===
Jones started the 2025 season by entering the Canberra International and was defeated in the first round by Elsa Jacquemot, in straight sets. A week later, she was handed a wildcard into the Adelaide International and caused a major upset in the first round by defeating the world No. 37, Wang Xinyu. The win marked Jones' first victory in a top-level WTA Tour event and secured her a career-high top 300 ranking. She lost to third seed Daria Kasatkina in the second round. Aged 16, Jones made her Grand Slam tournament debut at the Australian Open, after being given a wildcard into the main draw. She lost in the first round to sixth seed Elena Rybakina in straight sets.

=== 2026: BJK Cup debut, first WTA 1000 match win ===
Jones opened her 2026 season at the Brisbane International where she defeated Tatjana Maria, before losing to 10th seed Liudmila Samsonova in the second round. Making her second main-draw appearance at the Australian Open, she lost to 17th seed Victoria Mboko in the first round.

Having received a wildcard entry into the main draw at the Miami Open in March, Jones defeated qualifier Linda Fruhvirtová to record her first WTA 1000 win. She lost to ninth seed Elina Svitolina, in the second round.

In April, Jones was drafted into the Australian team for their BJK Cup qualifier against Great Britain in Melbourne, after Maya Joint pulled out due to a back injury. Making her debut appearance, she defeated Katie Swan in a dead rubber match played after Australia had already lost the overall tie.

Jones was given a wildcard entry to make her French Open debut, but lost to third seed Iga Świątek in the first round. In October, she qualified for the main-draw at the Japan Women's Open losing to top seed Ann Li in the first round.

== ITF Circuit finals ==
=== Singles: 7 (4 titles, 3 runner-ups) ===
Legend W100 tournaments (0–1) W75 tournaments (3–0) W35 tournaments (1–1) W15 tournaments (0–1)	Finals by surface Hard (3–2) Grass (0–1) Carpet (1–0)

Result	W–L	Date	Tournament	Tier	Surface	Opponent	Score
Loss	0–1	Jul 2023	ITF Caloundra, Australia	W15	Hard	(Australia) Melisa Ercan	3–6, 0–6
Loss	0–2	Mar 2024	ITF Swan Hill, Australia	W35	Grass	(Australia) Gabriella Da Silva-Fick	6–3, 3–6, 1–6
Win	1–2	Oct 2024	Sydney Challenger, Australia	W75	Hard	(Australia) Taylah Preston	6–4, 7–6^{(3)}
Win	2–2	May 2025	Fukuoka International, Japan	W35	Carpet	(Japan) Himeno Sakatsume	7–6^{(4)}, 6–4
Win	3–2	Nov 2025	Playford International, Australia	W75	Hard	(Australia) Maddison Inglis	6–4, 6–4
Win	4–2	Feb 2026	Queensland International, Australia	W75	Hard	(China) Zhu Lin	6–4, 7–5
Loss	4–3	May 2026	Kangaroo Cup, Japan	W100	Hard	(Thailand) Mananchaya Sawangkaew	6–7^{(2)}, 3–6

== Junior Grand Slam tournament finals ==
=== Singles: 2 (runner-ups) ===
Result	Year	Tournament	Surface	Opponent	Score
Loss	2024	Australian Open	Hard	(Slovakia) Renáta Jamrichová	4–6, 1–6
Loss	2024	Wimbledon	Grass	(Slovakia) Renáta Jamrichová	3–6, 4–6

=== Doubles: 1 (runner-up) ===
Result	Year	Tournament	Surface	Partner	Opponents	Score
Loss	2025	Australian Open	Hard	(United Kingdom) Hannah Klugman	(United States) Annika Penickova (United States) Kristina Penickova	4–6, 2–6
