= Hayato Matsuoka =

Japanese tennis player (born 2005)

- Country (sports): Japan
- Born: 15 January 2005 (age 21) Kanagawa Prefecture, Japan
- Height: 1.80 m (5 ft 11 in)
- Plays: Right-handed (two-handed backhand)
- Prize money: US $101,185

Singles
- Career record: 0–0 (at ATP Tour level, Grand Slam level, and in Davis Cup)
- Career titles: 1 ATP Challenger, 1 ITF
- Highest ranking: No. 242 (19 October 2026)
- Current ranking: No. 242 (19 October 2026)

Doubles
- Career record: 0–0 (at ATP Tour level, Grand Slam level, and in Davis Cup)
- Career titles: 1 ITF
- Highest ranking: No. 841 (8 June 2026)
- Current ranking: No. 1,039 (19 October 2026)
- Last updated on: 19 October 2026.

Hayato Matsuoka (born 15 January 2005) is a Japanese tennis player. Matsuoka has a career high ATP singles ranking of No. 242 achieved on 19 October 2026 and a career high ATP doubles ranking of No. 841 achieved on 8 June 2026.

Matsuoka has won one ATP Challenger singles title at the 2026 President's Cup.

== ATP Challenger Tour finals ==
=== Singles: 2 (1 title, 1 runner-up) ===
Legend ATP Challenger Tour (1–1)

Result	W–L	Date	Tournament	Tier	Surface	Opponent	Score
Loss	0–1	Nov 2025	NSW Open, Australia	Challenger	Hard	(Australia) James Duckworth	1–6, 4–6
Win	1–1	Aug 2026	President's Cup, Kazakhstan	Challenger	Hard	(Tunisia) Aziz Dougaz	0–6, 6–1, 7–6^{(7–5)}

== ITF World Tennis Tour finals ==
=== Singles: 2 (1 title, 1 runner-up) ===
Legend ITF WTT (1–1)

Result	W–L	Date	Tournament	Tier	Surface	Opponent	Score
Loss	0–1	May 2024	M15 Kuršumlijska Banja, Serbia	WTT	Clay	Marat Sharipov	1–6, 6–0, 4–6
Win	1–1	Dec 2024	M15 Bali, Indonesia	WTT	Hard	(France) Arthur Weber	6–4, 5–7, 6–2

=== Doubles: 2 (1 title, 1 runner-up) ===
Legend ITF WTT (1–1)

Result	W–L	Date	Tournament	Tier	Surface	Partner	Opponents	Score
Loss	0–1	Dec 2022	M15 Antalya, Turkey	WTT	Clay	(Japan) Geni Inoue	Egor Noskin; Evgeny Philippov	1–6, 4–6
Win	1–1	Jun 2024	M15 Casablanca, Morocco	WTT	Clay	(Germany) Lasse Poertner	(Morocco) Mehdi Benchakroun (Morocco) Yassine Dlimi	6–7^{(8–10)}, 6–2, [10–8]
