= Elena Micic =

Australian tennis player (born 2004)

- Country (sports): Australia
- Residence: Caroline Springs, Australia
- Born: 13 July 2004 (age 22)
- Plays: Right-handed
- Prize money: $157,591

Singles
- Career record: 107–104
- Highest ranking: No. 345 (16 March 2026)
- Current ranking: No. 345 (18 May 2026)

Grand Slam singles results
- Australian Open: Q3 (2025)

Doubles
- Career record: 65–50
- Career titles: 7 ITF
- Highest ranking: No. 216 (1 December 2025)
- Current ranking: No. 257 (18 May 2026)

Grand Slam doubles results
- Australian Open Junior: 1R (2020)
- Last updated on: 20 May 2026.

Elena Micic (born 13 July 2004) is an Australian tennis player. She has a career-high singles ranking of 345 by the WTA, achieved on 16 March 2026, and a best WTA doubles ranking of 216, reached on 1 December 2025.

Micic began playing tennis at the age of three in her home in Caroline Springs, Victoria.

She made her WTA Tour main-draw debut at the 2024 Adelaide International, where she partnered Tina Nadine Smith in the doubles competition.

Micic won her first $50k title at Montemor-o-Novo in Portugal in the doubles draw, partnering Alana Parnaby.

Given a wildcard entry, she made it through to the final round of qualifying at the 2025 Australian Open, where she lost to Polina Kudermetova.

Ranked at world No. 302, Micic qualified to make her WTA Tour main-draw debut at the 2026 Athens Open and defeated wildcard entrant Martha Matoula, before losing to Zheng Qinwen in the second round.

== WTA 125 finals ==
=== Doubles: 3 (3 runner-ups) ===
Result	W–L	Date	Tournament	Surface	Partner	Opponents	Score
Loss	0–1	Jun 2026	Figueira da Foz Open, Portugal	Hard	(France) Kristina Mladenovic	(Slovakia) Viktória Hrunčáková (Slovakia) Katarína Kužmová	4–6, 4–6
Loss	0–2	Sep 2026	Caldas da Rainha Ladies Open, Portugal	Hard	(India) Rutuja Bhosale	(Australia) Gabriella Da Silva-Fick (Kazakhstan) Zhibek Kulambayeva	6–3,^{(5)}6–7, [7–10]
Loss	0–3	Oct 2026	Samsun Open, Turkey	Hard	(India) Rutuja Bhosale	Elena Pridankina; Anastasia Tikhonova	6–7(5), 7–6(7), [3–10]

== ITF Circuit finals ==
=== Singles: 2 (2 runner-ups) ===
Legend W50 tournaments (0–1) W35 tournaments (0–1)	Finals by surface Hard (0–2)

Result	W–L	Date	Tournament	Tier	Surface	Opponent	Score
Loss	0–1	Oct 2025	ITF Darwin, Australia	W35	Hard	(South Korea) Jeong Bo-young	2–6, 5–7
Loss	0–2	Jun 2026	ITF Palma del Río, Spain	W50	Hard	(Netherlands) Eva Vedder	4–6, 4–6

=== Doubles: 16 (7 titles, 9 runner-ups) ===
Legend W75 tournaments W50 tournaments W35 tournaments W15 tournaments	Finals by surface Hard (6–7) Clay (1–1) Grass (0–1)

Result	W–L	Date	Location	Tier	Surface	Partner	Opponents	Score
Loss	0–1	May 2023	ITF Kuršumlijska Banja, Serbia	W15	Clay	(Serbia) Anja Stanković	(Latvia) Margarita Ignatjeva; Anastasia Sukhotina	5–7, 1–6
Win	1–1	May 2023	ITF Kuršumlijska Banja, Serbia	W15	Clay	(Serbia) Anja Stanković	(China) Guo Meiqi (China) Wang Meiling	6–2, 6–4
Win	2–1	Jun 2024	ITF Montemor-o-Novo, Portugal	W50	Hard	(Australia) Alana Parnaby	(Hong Kong) Eudice Chong (Italy) Lucrezia Musetti	7–6^{(6)}, 6–4
Loss	2–2	Jul 2024	ITF Corroios, Portugal	W50	Hard	(Portugal) Matilde Jorge	(Poland) Martyna Kubka (United States) Anna Rogers	1–6, 4–6
Win	3–2	Jan 2025	Queensland International, Australia	W75	Hard	(Australia) Petra Hule	(Australia) Lizette Cabrera (Australia) Taylah Preston	2–6, 6–2, [10–6]
Win	4–2	Feb 2025	Burnie International, Australia	W35	Hard	(New Zealand) Monique Barry	(Australia) Gabriella Da Silva-Fick (Australia) Belle Thompson	6–3, 6–4
Win	5–2	Feb 2025	Launceston International, Australia	W35	Hard	(Australia) Monique Barry	(Japan) Miho Kuramochi (Japan) Erika Sema	6–2, 6–4
Loss	5–3	Mar 2025	ITF Swan Hill, Australia	W35	Grass	(Australia) Monique Barry	(Japan) Ayumi Miyamoto (Australia) Stefani Webb	3–6, 6–4, [4–10]
Loss	5–4	Jul 2025	ITF Corroios, Portugal	W50	Hard	(India) Riya Bhatia	(Hong Kong) Eudice Chong (Chinese Taipei) Liang En-shuo	1–6, 0–6
Loss	5–5	Sep 2025	ITF Wagga Wagga, Australia	W35	Hard	(Australia) Belle Thompson	(Japan) Haruna Arakawa (Japan) Ayumi Miyamoto	2–6, 6–4, [4–10]
Loss	5–6	Nov 2025	NSW Open, Australia	W75	Hard	(Australia) Petra Hule	(Japan) Hiromi Abe (Japan) Ikumi Yamazaki	4–6, 4–6
Loss	5–7	Feb 2026	Queensland International, Australia	W75	Hard	(Australia) Petra Hule	(Japan) Hayu Kinoshita (China) Zhang Ying	6–7^{(5)}, 5–7
Win	6–7	Jun 2026	ITF Montemor-o-Novo, Portugal	W50	Hard	(Slovakia) Katarína Kužmová	(United Kingdom) Esther Adeshina (United Kingdom) Lauryn John-Baptiste	6–2, 4–6, [10–7]
Loss	6–8	Jun 2026	ITF Palma del Río, Spain	W50	Hard	(Australia) Belle Thompson	(India) Rutuja Bhosale (China) Tian Fangran	3–6, 4–6
Win	7–8	Jun 2026	ITF Elvas, Portugal	W50	Hard	(China) Shi Han	(India) Vaishnavi Adkar (India) Rutuja Bhosale	6–4, 6–3
Loss	7–9	Sep 2026	ITF Évora, Portugal	W50	Hard	(Slovakia) Katarína Kužmová	(Canada) Ariana Arseneault (Canada) Raphaëlle Lacasse	3–6, 4–6
