= 2027 ATP Finals =

- Date: 14–21 November
- Edition: 58th (singles) / 53rd (doubles)
- Category: ATP Finals
- Draw: 8S/8D
- Surface: Hard (indoor)
- Location: Turin, Italy
- Venue: Inalpi Arena
- ATP Finals

The 2027 ATP Finals (also known as the 2027 Nitto ATP Finals due to Nitto sponsorship) is a planned men's tennis tournament that is scheduled to run from 14 to 21 November 2027. It is set to be played on indoor hardcourts at the Inalpi Arena in Turin, Italy for the seventh consecutive time, and will be the season-ending event for the highest-ranked singles players and doubles teams on the 2027 ATP Tour. The tournament is due to be the 58th edition of the singles event and the 53rd edition of the doubles competition.

== Format ==
The ATP Finals group stage has a round-robin format, with eight players/teams divided into two groups of four and each player/team in a group playing the other three in the group. The eight seeds are determined by the PIF ATP rankings and ATP Doubles Team Rankings on the Monday after the last ATP Tour tournament of the calendar year. All singles matches, including the final, are best of three sets with tie-breaks in each set including the third. All doubles matches are two sets (no ad) and a Match Tie-break.

In deciding placement within a group, the following criteria are used, in order:

1. Most wins.
2. Most matches played (e.g., a 2–1 record beats a 2–0 record).
3. Head-to-head result between tied players/teams.
4. Highest percentage of sets won.
5. Highest percentage of games won.
6. ATP rank after the last ATP Tour tournament of the year.

Criteria 4–6 are used only in the event of a three-way tie; if one of these criteria decided a winner or loser among the three, the remaining two will have been ranked by head-to-head result.

The top two of each group will advance to semifinals, with the winner of each group playing the runner-up of the other group. The winners of the semifinals then will play for the title.

== Qualification ==
=== Singles ===
Eight players compete at the tournament, with two named alternates. Players receive places in the following order of precedence:

1. First, the top 7 players in the ATP Race to Turin after the 2027 Paris Masters.
2. Second, up to two 2027 Grand Slam tournament winners ranked anywhere 8th–20th, in ranking order
3. Third, the eighth ranked player in the ATP rankings

In the event of this totaling more than 8 players, those lower down in the selection order become the alternates. If further alternates are needed, these players are selected by the ATP.

Provisional rankings are published weekly as the ATP Race to Turin, coinciding with the 52-week rolling ATP rankings on the date of selection. Points are accumulated in Grand Slam, ATP Tour, United Cup, ATP Challenger Tour and ITF Tour tournaments. Players accrue points across 18 tournaments, usually made up of:

- The 4 Grand Slam tournaments
- The 8 mandatory ATP Masters 1000 tournaments
- The best results from any 6 other tournaments that carry ranking points (Monte-Carlo Masters, United Cup, ATP 500, ATP 250, Challenger, ITF)
- Player can replace up to 3 mandatory Masters 1000 results with a better score from ATP 500 or ATP 250

=== Doubles ===
Eight teams compete at the tournament, with one named alternate. The eight competing teams receive places according to the same order of precedence as in singles. The named alternate will be offered first to any unaccepted teams in the selection order, then to the highest ranked unaccepted team, and then to a team selected by the ATP. Points are accumulated in the same competitions as for the singles tournament. However, for doubles teams there are no commitment tournaments, so teams are ranked according to their 18 highest points scoring results from any tournaments on the ATP Tour.

== Points breakdown ==
Grand Slam: Australian Open, French Open, Wimbledon, US Open.
Masters: IW = Indian Wells; MI = Miami Open; MA = Madrid Open; IT = Italian Open; CA = Canada Open; CI = Cincinnati Open; SH = Shanghai Masters; PA = Paris Masters
Results: W = Winner; F = Finals; SF= Semifinals; QF= Quarterfinals; R16 = Round of 16; R32 = Round of 32, R64 = Round of 64; R128 = Round of 128; RR = Round Robin; A = absent; Tourn = Number of tournaments.

=== Singles ===
Player is active in Florianópolis, Playford, Yokohama or San Salvador.

Updated as of 22 November 2026.

Rank	Player	Grand Slam				ATP Masters 1000 (mandatory)								Best other						Total points	Tourn	Titles
Rank	Player	AUS	FRA	WIM	USO	IW	MI	MA	IT	CA	CI	SH	PA	1	2	3	4	5	6	Total points	Tourn	Titles
1	(United States) Taylor Fritz													W 250						250	1	1
2	(Finland) Otto Virtanen													W 125	F 64					189	2	0
3	(Argentina) Thiago Agustín Tirante													F 165						165	1	0
4	(United Kingdom) Toby Samuel													W 125	R16; 38					163	2	0
5	(Italy) Francesco Passaro													W 125	Q1; 0					125	2	0
6	(Italy) Lorenzo Musetti													SF; 100						100	1	0
6	(Chile) Alejandro Tabilo													SF; 100						100	1	0
8	(United States) Nishesh Basavareddy													F 64	SF; 35					99	2	0
Alternates
9	(France) Clément Chidekh													W 75	SF; 22					97	2	0
10	(United States) Sebastian Gorzny													W 75	SF; 22	R32; 0				97	3	0
11	(United Kingdom) Billy Harris													W 75	QF; 12					87	2	0
12	(Switzerland) Dylan Dietrich													W 75						75	1	0
12	(Spain) Nikolás Sánchez Izquierdo													W 75						75	1	0
12	(Brazil) Thiago Seyboth Wild													W 75						75	1	0
15	(Japan) Yosuke Watanuki													W 75	R32; 0					75	2	0
16	(Denmark) August Holmgren													W 75	R32; 0	R32; 0				75	3	0
17	(Mexico) Luis Carlos Álvarez													W 25	W 25	W 15	R32; 0			65	4	0
18	(South Korea) Kwon Soon-woo													F 64						64	1	0
19	(Kazakhstan) Alexander Shevchenko													QF; 63						63	1	0
20	(United States) Christian Langmo													F 48	QF; 12	R32; 0				60	3	0
20	(Uruguay) Franco Roncadelli													F 48	QF; 12	R32; 0				60	3	0

== See also ==
- ATP rankings
- ATP Finals appearances
