= 2026 El Salvador Open – Doubles =

Doubles
- 2026 El Salvador Open

Events
Singles	Doubles
- El Salvador Open

This is the first edition of the tournament.

== Seeds ==
1. (El Salvador) Marcelo Arévalo / (Mexico) Miguel Ángel Reyes-Varela
2. (Antigua and Barbuda) Jody Maginley / (United States) Karl Poling
3. (Brazil) Mateus Alves / (Venezuela) Brandon Pérez
4. (Argentina) Luciano Emanuel Ambrogi / (Colombia) Juan Sebastián Gómez

== Draw ==
Key

- Q = Qualifier
- WC = Wild card
- LL = Lucky loser
- Alt = Alternate
- ITF = ITF entry
- PR = Protected ranking
- SR = Special ranking
- SE = Special exempt
- JE = Junior exempt
- JR = Junior Accelerator Programme entrant
- CO = College Accelerator Programme entrant
- NG = Next Gen Accelerator Program entrant
- w/o = Walkover
- r = Retired
- d = Defaulted

First round
(United States) Miles Clark (United States) Kyle Overmyer
(United States) Jeffrey Fradkin (United States) Axel Nefve
4	(Argentina) LE Ambrogi (Colombia) JS Gómez
WC	(Colombia) Juan Miguel Bolívar Idárraga (El Salvador) Juan Carlos Fuentes Vásquez
(Colombia) Samuel Heredia (Colombia) Juan Sebastián Osorio
WC	(El Salvador) César Cruz (El Salvador) Diego Durán
(Israel) Ofek Shimanov (Israel) Ben Weintraub
(Mexico) LC Álvarez (Costa Rica) J Flores
(France) YT Alexandrescou (Nicaragua) Joaquín Guilleme
3	(Brazil) M Alves (Venezuela) B Pérez
(Canada) Volodymyr Gurenko (Colombia) A Urrea
(Canada) Benjamin Thomas George (Canada) Niels Peter van Noord
(Italy) Matteo Covato (United States) Gray Voelzke
2	(Antigua and Barbuda) J Maginley (United States) K Poling

Quarterfinals
1	(El Salvador) M Arévalo (Mexico) M Reyes-Varela
(United States) (United States)
(Colombia)
(Canada)
(United States)

Semifinals

Final
