= 2026 City of Playford Tennis International – Men's doubles =

Men's doubles
- 2026 City of Playford Tennis International
- 2025 Champions: (Australia) Jake Delaney (Australia) Li Tu

Events
Singles	men	women
Doubles	men	women
- City of Playford Tennis International

Jake Delaney and Li Tu were the defending champions but chose to defend their title with different partners. Delaney partnered Jesse Delaney. Tu partnered Blake Ellis.

== Seeds ==
1. (Australia) Blake Bayldon / (Australia) Thomas Fancutt
2. (Chinese Taipei) Jason Jung / (New Zealand) Ajeet Rai
3. (Australia) Jake Delaney / (Australia) Jesse Delaney
4. (Australia) Calum Puttergill / (Australia) Dane Sweeny

== Draw ==
Key

- Q = Qualifier
- WC = Wild card
- LL = Lucky loser
- Alt = Alternate
- ITF = ITF entry
- PR = Protected ranking
- SR = Special ranking
- SE = Special exempt
- JE = Junior exempt
- JR = Junior Accelerator Programme entrant
- CO = College Accelerator Programme entrant
- NG = Next Gen Accelerator Program entrant
- w/o = Walkover
- r = Retired
- d = Defaulted

First round
1	(Australia) B Bayldon (Australia) T Fancutt
(Australia) A Bolt (Australia) J Kubler
WC	(Australia) H Jones (Australia) Pavle Marinkov
(Australia) Enzo Aguiard (Australia) Casey Hoole
3	(Australia) Ja Delaney (Australia) Je Delaney
(Australia) M Bouzige (United States) E Zhu
(New Zealand) Reece Falck (United States) B Suarez
(Japan) A Santillan (China) B Zheng
(Japan) S Hazawa (Japan) Yamato Sueoka
(Australia) B Ellis (Australia) L Tu
(Norway) Herman Høyeraal (Australia) Eric Padgham
4	(Australia) C Puttergill (Australia) D Sweeny
(Australia) Ethan Cook (Australia) Tai Sach
(New Zealand) I Becroft (New Zealand) Anton Shepp
WC	(Australia) Daniel Jovanovski (Australia) Zane Stevens
2	(Chinese Taipei) J Jung (New Zealand) A Rai

Quarterfinals
(Australia) (Australia)
(Australia) (Australia)
(Australia)
(Australia)

Semifinals
(Australia) (Australia)

Final
