= 2026 Kobe Challenger =

- Date: 16–22 November
- Edition: 10th
- Surface: Hard (indoor)
- Location: Kobe, Japan

Champions

Singles
- (Japan) Yosuke Watanuki

Doubles
- (New Zealand) Finn Reynolds / (New Zealand) James Watt
- Kobe Challenger

The 2026 Hyōgo Noah Challenger was a professional tennis tournament played on indoor hard courts. It was the 10th edition of the tournament which was part of the 2026 ATP Challenger Tour. It took place in Kobe, Japan between 16 and 22 November 2026.

== Singles main-draw entrants ==
=== Seeds ===
Country	Player	Rank^{1}	Seed
CHN	Zhang Zhizhen	156	1
JPN	Taro Daniel	172	2
USA	Keegan Smith	189	3
ESP	David Jordà Sanchis	195	4
GBR	Liam Broady	215	5
GBR	Billy Harris	227	6
JPN	Rio Noguchi	233	7
JPN	Yosuke Watanuki	237	8

- ^{1} Rankings are as of 9 November 2026.

=== Other entrants ===
The following players received wildcards into the singles main draw:

- (Japan) Naoya Honda
- (Japan) Ryuki Matsuda
- (Japan) Yuta Tomida

The following player received entry into the singles main draw through the Junior Accelerator programme:

- (Germany) Niels McDonald

The following players received entry from the qualifying draw:

- (Lebanon) Benjamin Hassan
- (Japan) Taisei Ichikawa
- (Japan) Masamichi Imamura
- (Thailand) Maximus Jones
- (Japan) Takuya Kumasaka
- (Japan) Koki Matsuda

== Champions ==
=== Singles ===
- (Japan) Yosuke Watanuki def. (United Kingdom) Liam Broady 6–3, 6–4.

=== Doubles ===
- (New Zealand) Finn Reynolds / (New Zealand) James Watt def. (Netherlands) Thijmen Loof / (Japan) Kaito Uesugi 4–6, 7–6^{(7–5)}, [10–6].
