= 2026 City of Playford Tennis International – Men's singles =

Men's singles
- 2026 City of Playford Tennis International
- 2025 Champion: (Australia) Rinky Hijikata

Events
Singles	men	women
Doubles	men	women
- City of Playford Tennis International

Rinky Hijikata was the defending champion but chose not to defend his title.

== Seeds ==
1. (Australia) Dane Sweeny
2. (Australia) Tristan Schoolkate
3. (Denmark) August Holmgren
4. (Australia) Alex Bolt
5. (Australia) Matthew Dellavedova
6. (Australia) Omar Jasika
7. (Germany) Florian Broska
8. (Denmark) Carl Emil Overbeck

== Draw ==
Key

- Q = Qualifier
- WC = Wild card
- LL = Lucky loser
- Alt = Alternate
- ITF = ITF entry
- PR = Protected ranking
- SR = Special ranking
- SE = Special exempt
- JE = Junior exempt
- JR = Junior Accelerator Programme entrant
- CO = College Accelerator Programme entrant
- NG = Next Gen Accelerator Program entrant
- w/o = Walkover
- r = Retired
- d = Defaulted

=== Finals ===
Semifinals

Final

=== Top half ===
First round
1	(Australia) D Sweeny
(Australia) Ja Delaney
Q
WC	(Australia) H Jones
Q
Q
Alt	(New Zealand) I Becroft
8	(Denmark) CE Overbeck
3	(Denmark) A Holmgren
(Japan) A Santillan
(Australia) Tai Sach
(United States) Christian Langmo
(Japan) H Moriya
WC	(Australia) Daniel Jovanovski
Q
5	(Australia) Matthew Dellavedova

Second round
(Australia)
Q

Quarterfinals

Semifinals

=== Bottom half ===
First round
6	(Australia) O Jasika
(United States) S Gorzny
(Australia) E Winter
(Australia) L Tu
WC	(Australia) Derek Pham
Q
(United States) A Ayeni
4	(Australia) A Bolt
7	(Germany) F Broska
(New Zealand) Anton Shepp
(India) D Suresh
(Australia) M Bouzige
(Australia) Enzo Aguiard
(Australia) B Ellis
Q
2	(Australia) T Schoolkate

Second round
(Australia)
(Australia)

Quarterfinals

Semifinals
