= 2026 Uruguay Open =

- Date: 16–22 November
- Edition: 21st
- Surface: Clay
- Location: Montevideo, Uruguay

Champions

Singles
- (Brazil) Thiago Seyboth Wild

Doubles
- (Colombia) Nicolás Barrientos / (Argentina) Mariano Kestelboim
- Uruguay Open

The 2026 Uruguay Open was a professional tennis tournament played on red clay courts in Montevideo. It was the 21st edition of the tournament which was part of the 2026 ATP Challenger Tour. It took place in Montevideo, Uruguay between 16 and 22 November 2026.

== Singles main-draw entrants ==
=== Seeds ===
Country	Player	Rank^{1}	Seed
~~ARG~~	~~Camilo Ugo Carabelli~~	~~65~~	~~1~~
BRA	Thiago Seyboth Wild	98	2
BOL	Hugo Dellien	106	3
POR	Henrique Rocha	111	4
ESP	Max Alcalá Gurri	131	5
ARG	Francisco Comesaña	138	6
DEN	Elmer Møller	148	7
ARG	Lautaro Midón	180	8

- ^{1} Rankings are as of 9 November 2026.

=== Other entrants ===
The following players received wildcards into the singles main draw:

- (Uruguay) Federico Aguilar Cardozo
- (Uruguay) Joaquín Aguilar Cardozo
- (Chile) Nicolas Jarry

The following player received entry into the singles main draw as a special exempt:

- (Uruguay) Franco Roncadelli

The following players received entry into the singles main draw as alternates:

- (Argentina) Valerio Aboian
- (Chile) Matías Soto

The following players received entry from the qualifying draw:

- (Argentina) Thiago Cigarrán
- (Argentina) Nicolás Kicker
- (Brazil) Felipe Meligeni Alves
- (Spain) Oriol Roca Batalla
- (Spain) Carlos Sánchez Jover
- (Argentina) Gonzalo Villanueva

The following player received entry as a lucky loser:

- (Brazil) Pedro Boscardin Dias

== Champions ==
=== Singles ===
- (Brazil) Thiago Seyboth Wild def. (Brazil) Matheus Pucinelli de Almeida 6–3, 6–4.

=== Doubles ===
- (Colombia) Nicolás Barrientos / (Argentina) Mariano Kestelboim def. (Poland) Karol Drzewiecki / (Poland) Piotr Matuszewski 6–3, 6–2.
