= 2026 ITF Men's World Tennis Tour (October–December) =

The 2026 ITF Men's World Tennis Tour is the 2026 edition of the second-tier tour for men's professional tennis. It is organised by the International Tennis Federation and is a tier below the ATP Challenger Tour. The ITF Men's World Tennis Tour includes tournaments with prize money ranging from $15,000 to $25,000.

Since 2022, following the Russian invasion of Ukraine the ITF announced that players from Belarus and Russia could still play on the tour but would not be allowed to play under the flag of Belarus or Russia.

== Key ==
M25 tournaments
M15 tournaments

== Month ==
=== October ===
Week of	Tournament	Winner	Runners-up	Semifinalists	Quarterfinalists
October 5	Darwin, Australia; Hard; M25; Singles and doubles draws	(Australia) Casey Hoole; 6–3, 6–7^{(2–7)}, 6–2	(Australia) Stefan Vujic	(Australia) Zane Stevens (Australia) Philip Sekulic	(Australia) Jake Delaney (Australia) Moerani Bouzige (Australia) Hayden Jones (Australia) Sam Ryan Ziegann
October 5	Darwin, Australia; Hard; M25; Singles and doubles draws	(Norway) Herman Hoeyeraal (Australia) Eric Padgham; 6–4, 7–6^{(7–5)}	(Australia) Joshua Charlton (New Zealand) Reece Falck	(Australia) Zane Stevens (Australia) Philip Sekulic	(Australia) Jake Delaney (Australia) Moerani Bouzige (Australia) Hayden Jones (Australia) Sam Ryan Ziegann
October 5	Lu'an, China; Hard; M25; Singles and doubles draws	(Australia) Matthew Dellavedova; 6–2, 6–1	(Turkey) Mert Alkaya	(Turkey) Yankı Erel (Germany) Nino Ehrenschneider	(China) Zeng Yaojie (New Zealand) Anton Shepp (Chinese Taipei) Chen Yan-cheng (Japan) Yuta Tomida
October 5	Lu'an, China; Hard; M25; Singles and doubles draws	(New Zealand) Isaac Becroft (New Zealand) Anton Shepp; 6–2, 7–5	(Germany) Nikolai Barsukov (Germany) Nino Ehrenschneider	(Turkey) Yankı Erel (Germany) Nino Ehrenschneider	(China) Zeng Yaojie (New Zealand) Anton Shepp (Chinese Taipei) Chen Yan-cheng (Japan) Yuta Tomida
October 5	Santa Margherita di Pula, Italy; Clay; M25; Singles and doubles draws	(Italy) Alexander Weis; 1–6, 7–5, 6–1	(Poland) Daniel Michalski	(Bulgaria) Ivan Ivanov; Andrey Chepelev	(Italy) Giovanni Oradini (France) Laurent Lokoli (Italy) Gabriele Crivellaro (Italy) Stefano D'Agostino
October 5	Santa Margherita di Pula, Italy; Clay; M25; Singles and doubles draws	(Italy) Gabriele Crivellaro (Italy) Giovanni Oradini; 7–6^{(9–7)}, 6–3	(Italy) Alessandro Spadola (Italy) Matteo Vavassori	(Bulgaria) Ivan Ivanov; Andrey Chepelev	(Italy) Giovanni Oradini (France) Laurent Lokoli (Italy) Gabriele Crivellaro (Italy) Stefano D'Agostino
October 5	Kigali, Rwanda; Clay; M25; Singles and doubles draws	(Netherlands) Max Houkes; 6–2, 6–7^{(4–7)}, 7–5	(India) Dev Javia	(France) Calvin Hemery (France) Corentin Denolly	(South Africa) Alec Beckley (Germany) Marlon Vankan (Algeria) Toufik Sahtali (France) Florent Bax
October 5	Kigali, Rwanda; Clay; M25; Singles and doubles draws	(United States) Preston Brown (Mexico) Rafael de Alba; 6–2, 7–5	(Mexico) Rodrigo Alujas (France) Florent Bax	(France) Calvin Hemery (France) Corentin Denolly	(South Africa) Alec Beckley (Germany) Marlon Vankan (Algeria) Toufik Sahtali (France) Florent Bax
October 5	Pontevedra, Spain; Hard; M15; Singles and doubles draws	(Spain) Sergio Callejón Hernando; 6–1, 1–6, 6–1	(France) Matisse Bobichon	(Spain) Alejandro García Carbajal (Slovenia) Žiga Šeško	(Italy) Andrea Bacaloni (Armenia) Daniil Sarksian (Germany) David Eichenseher (Portugal) Diogo Marques
October 5	Pontevedra, Spain; Hard; M15; Singles and doubles draws	(Spain) Alejandro García Carbajal (Spain) Xavi Palomar; 7–5, 7–6^{(8–6)}	(Portugal) Vasco Leote Prata (Portugal) Diogo Marques	(Spain) Alejandro García Carbajal (Slovenia) Žiga Šeško	(Italy) Andrea Bacaloni (Armenia) Daniil Sarksian (Germany) David Eichenseher (Portugal) Diogo Marques
October 5	Rodez, France; Hard (i); M15+H; Singles and doubles draws	(France) Adrien Gobat; 7–5, 4–6, 7–6^{(7–5)}	(Netherlands) Jelle Sels	(France) Axel Garcian (United Kingdom) Emile Hudd	(France) Guillaume Dalmasso (France) Daniel Jade (France) Loann Massard (Germany) Julien Penzlin
October 5	Rodez, France; Hard (i); M15+H; Singles and doubles draws	(Germany) Calvin Müller (Germany) Julien Penzlin; 6–3, 6–2	(France) Axel Garcian (France) Maxence Rivet	(France) Axel Garcian (United Kingdom) Emile Hudd	(France) Guillaume Dalmasso (France) Daniel Jade (France) Loann Massard (Germany) Julien Penzlin
October 5	Burgas, Bulgaria; Clay; M15; Singles and doubles draws	(Bulgaria) George Lazarov; 6–0, 6–1	(Italy) Mattia Nannelli	(Slovenia) Jan Kupčič (Romania) Matei Florin Breazu	(Italy) Iannis Miletich (Romania) Vlad Cristian Breazu (Italy) Giannicola Misasi (Bulgaria) Aleksandar Tolev
October 5	Burgas, Bulgaria; Clay; M15; Singles and doubles draws	(Romania) Matei Florin Breazu (Romania) Vlad Cristian Breazu; 6–7^{(4–7)}, 7–5, [10–4]	(Bulgaria) George Lazarov; Vardan Manukyan	(Slovenia) Jan Kupčič (Romania) Matei Florin Breazu	(Italy) Iannis Miletich (Romania) Vlad Cristian Breazu (Italy) Giannicola Misasi (Bulgaria) Aleksandar Tolev
October 5	Heraklion, Greece; Hard; M15; Singles and doubles draws	(Czech Republic) Jakub Filip; 3–6, 6–1, 6–1	(Israel) Jordan Hasson	(Israel) Amit Vales (Italy) Giulio Perego	(United Kingdom) Finn Murgett (Uzbekistan) Nikita Belozertsev (Republic of Ireland) Ammar Elamin (Hungary) Péter Makk
October 5	Heraklion, Greece; Hard; M15; Singles and doubles draws	(United Kingdom) Finn Murgett (United Kingdom) Marcus Walters; 6–4, 6–2	(France) Benjamin Pietri (France) Mathieu Scaglia	(Israel) Amit Vales (Italy) Giulio Perego	(United Kingdom) Finn Murgett (Uzbekistan) Nikita Belozertsev (Republic of Ireland) Ammar Elamin (Hungary) Péter Makk
October 5	Sharm El Sheikh, Egypt; Hard; M15; Singles and doubles draws	(Latvia) Robert Strombachs; 6–2, 6–4	Anton Arzhankin	(Egypt) Amr Elsayed (Belgium) Romain Faucon	(Latvia) Rihards Neimanis (Lithuania) Justas Trainauskas (Turkey) Koray Kırcı (Switzerland) Nicola Senn
October 5	Sharm El Sheikh, Egypt; Hard; M15; Singles and doubles draws	(Finland) Oskari Paldanius (Poland) Jan Sadzik; 6–2, 7–6^{(7–1)}	(France) Aaron Gabet (France) Ferdinand Livet Novkirichka	(Egypt) Amr Elsayed (Belgium) Romain Faucon	(Latvia) Rihards Neimanis (Lithuania) Justas Trainauskas (Turkey) Koray Kırcı (Switzerland) Nicola Senn
October 5	Monastir, Tunisia; Hard; M15; Singles and doubles draws	(Ivory Coast) Eliakim Coulibaly; 4–6, 7–6^{(7–5)}, 6–1	(Spain) John Echeverría	(Tunisia) Aziz Ouakaa (South Africa) Kris van Wyk	(Algeria) Mohamed Nazim Makhlouf (Turkey) Kaan Işık Koşaner (Germany) Luca Wiedenmann (France) Mathys Picard
October 5	Monastir, Tunisia; Hard; M15; Singles and doubles draws	(Tunisia) Skander Mansouri (Tunisia) Aziz Ouakaa; 6–4, 7–6^{(7–5)}	(Spain) Samuel de Felipe Garcia (Thailand) Tanapatt Nirundorn	(Tunisia) Aziz Ouakaa (South Africa) Kris van Wyk	(Algeria) Mohamed Nazim Makhlouf (Turkey) Kaan Işık Koşaner (Germany) Luca Wiedenmann (France) Mathys Picard
October 5	Quito, Ecuador; Clay; M15; Singles and doubles draws	(Brazil) Lucas Andrade da Silva; 6–4, 6–3	(United States) Tristan McCormick	(Brazil) Victor Bini (Italy) Matteo Covato	(Mexico) Alex Hernández (Argentina) Manuel Mouilleron Salvo (Colombia) Daniel Salazar (Argentina) Felipe de Dios
October 5	Quito, Ecuador; Clay; M15; Singles and doubles draws	(Colombia) Juan Sebastián Osorio (Colombia) Andrés Urrea; 7–6^{(7–2)}, 7–6^{(7–2)}	(United States) Dakotah Bobo (United States) Tristan McCormick	(Brazil) Victor Bini (Italy) Matteo Covato	(Mexico) Alex Hernández (Argentina) Manuel Mouilleron Salvo (Colombia) Daniel Salazar (Argentina) Felipe de Dios
October 12	Qiandaohu, China; Hard; M25; Singles and doubles draws	(Australia) Matthew Dellavedova; 6–4, 7–6^{(7–4)}	Martin Borisiouk	(Uzbekistan) Sergey Fomin; Egor Pleshivtsev	(Estonia) Kristjan Tamm (Japan) Yusuke Takahashi (Australia) Cruz Hewitt (France) Arthur Weber
October 12	Qiandaohu, China; Hard; M25; Singles and doubles draws	(New Zealand) Isaac Becroft (New Zealand) Anton Shepp; 6–3, 6–3	(Japan) Yamato Sueoka (China) Zheng Baoluo	(Uzbekistan) Sergey Fomin; Egor Pleshivtsev	(Estonia) Kristjan Tamm (Japan) Yusuke Takahashi (Australia) Cruz Hewitt (France) Arthur Weber
October 12	Solapur, India; Hard; M25; Singles and doubles draws	(United States) Samir Banerjee; 2–6, 6–4, 7–6^{(7–4)}	(India) Karan Singh	(Sweden) William Rejchtman Vinciguerra (Thailand) Thanapet Chanta	(India) Sidharth Rawat (India) Digvijaypratap Singh (United States) Adhithya Ganesan (India) S D Prajwal Dev
October 12	Solapur, India; Hard; M25; Singles and doubles draws	(India) Dhakshineswar Suresh (India) Manish Sureshkumar; 6–3, 6–4	(India) Adil Kalyanpur (Japan) Ryuki Matsuda	(Sweden) William Rejchtman Vinciguerra (Thailand) Thanapet Chanta	(India) Sidharth Rawat (India) Digvijaypratap Singh (United States) Adhithya Ganesan (India) S D Prajwal Dev
October 12	Santa Margherita di Pula, Italy; Clay; M25; Singles and doubles draws	(Czech Republic) Matthew William Donald; 6–0, 3–1 ret.	(Italy) Giorgio Tabacco	(Serbia) Branko Đurić (Italy) Alexander Weis	(Italy) Fausto Tabacco (Italy) Tommaso Compagnucci (Italy) Lorenzo Berto (Czech Republic) Jonáš Forejtek
October 12	Santa Margherita di Pula, Italy; Clay; M25; Singles and doubles draws	(Finland) Linus Lagerbohm (Finland) Eero Vasa; 6–1, 6–2	(Mexico) Luis Carlos Álvarez Valdés (Italy) Simone Massucco	(Serbia) Branko Đurić (Italy) Alexander Weis	(Italy) Fausto Tabacco (Italy) Tommaso Compagnucci (Italy) Lorenzo Berto (Czech Republic) Jonáš Forejtek
October 12	Luanda, Angola; Hard; M25; Singles and doubles draws	(Belgium) Jack Logé; 6–4, 6–3	(France) Thomas Faurel	(France) Florent Bax (Belgium) Émilien Demanet	(Burundi) Allan Gatoto (France) Louis Larue (France) Dorian Tremblay (Ghana) Isaac Nortey
October 12	Luanda, Angola; Hard; M25; Singles and doubles draws	(France) Dan Added (France) Thomas Faurel; 6–2, 6–2	(Portugal) Martim Bernardo (Angola) Daniel Domingos	(France) Florent Bax (Belgium) Émilien Demanet	(Burundi) Allan Gatoto (France) Louis Larue (France) Dorian Tremblay (Ghana) Isaac Nortey
October 12	Austin, United States; Hard; M25; Singles and doubles draws	(France) Cosme Rolland de Ravel; 5–7, 6–3, 6–3	(United Kingdom) Alastair Gray	(United States) Dominick Mosejczuk (United Kingdom) Lui Maxted	(United States) Sebastian Gorzny (Spain) Iker Urribarrens Ramírez (United States) Andrew Fenty (United States) Benjamin Willwerth
October 12	Austin, United States; Hard; M25; Singles and doubles draws	(France) Gabriel Debru (France) Lucas Marionneau; 6–7^{(3–7)}, 6–4, [10–1]	(United States) Jerry Roddick (Turkey) Togan Tokaç	(United States) Dominick Mosejczuk (United Kingdom) Lui Maxted	(United States) Sebastian Gorzny (Spain) Iker Urribarrens Ramírez (United States) Andrew Fenty (United States) Benjamin Willwerth
October 12	Offenbach am Main, Germany; Hard (i); M15; Singles and doubles draws	(Germany) Mika Petkovic; 5–7, 6–2, 6–2	(Germany) Calvin Müller	(Switzerland) Flynn Thomas (Italy) Leonardo Rossi	(Germany) Filip Krolo (Netherlands) Jelle Sels (France) Guillaume Dalmasso (Germany) David Eichenseher
October 12	Offenbach am Main, Germany; Hard (i); M15; Singles and doubles draws	(Germany) Moritz Hoffmann (Germany) Calvin Müller; 6–3, 6–4	(Republic of Ireland) Michael Agwi (United States) Leonardo Vega	(Switzerland) Flynn Thomas (Italy) Leonardo Rossi	(Germany) Filip Krolo (Netherlands) Jelle Sels (France) Guillaume Dalmasso (Germany) David Eichenseher
October 12	Szabolcsveresmart, Hungary; Hard (i); M15; Singles and doubles draws	(Slovakia) Lukáš Pokorný; 6–4, 6–2	(Italy) Pietro Fellin	(Sweden) Arvid Nordquist (Germany) Stefan Seifert	Vardan Manukyan (Norway) Leyton Rivera (Poland) Wojciech Marek (Austria) Jonas Gundacker
October 12	Szabolcsveresmart, Hungary; Hard (i); M15; Singles and doubles draws	(Sweden) Mans Dahlberg (Poland) Wojciech Marek; 7–6^{(7–5)}, 6–3	(Slovakia) Michal Krajčí (Ukraine) Andriy Poritskyy	(Sweden) Arvid Nordquist (Germany) Stefan Seifert	Vardan Manukyan (Norway) Leyton Rivera (Poland) Wojciech Marek (Austria) Jonas Gundacker
October 12	Bol, Croatia; Clay; M15; Singles and doubles draws	(Serbia) Kristijan Juhas; 6–1, 6–4	(Poland) Alan Ważny	(Ukraine) Nikita Mashtakov (Italy) Iannis Miletich	(France) Geoffrey Blancaneaux (Switzerland) Noah Lopez (Austria) Matthias Ujvary (Spain) Carles Córdoba
October 12	Bol, Croatia; Clay; M15; Singles and doubles draws	(Bosnia and Herzegovina) Ivan Biletić (Croatia) Karlo Kajin; 6–1, 3–6, [10–7]	(Serbia) Kristijan Juhas (Serbia) Stefan Popović	(Ukraine) Nikita Mashtakov (Italy) Iannis Miletich	(France) Geoffrey Blancaneaux (Switzerland) Noah Lopez (Austria) Matthias Ujvary (Spain) Carles Córdoba
October 12	Heraklion, Greece; Hard; M15; Singles and doubles draws	(Israel) Amit Vales; 6–2, 6–3	(Slovenia) Luka Talan Lopatić	(Greece) Ioannis Xilas (United Kingdom) Finn Murgett	(Netherlands) Jip van Assendelft (Uzbekistan) Nikita Belozertsev (Hungary) Péter Makk (Italy) Giulio Perego
October 12	Heraklion, Greece; Hard; M15; Singles and doubles draws	(United Kingdom) William Nolan (Italy) Giulio Perego; 2–6, 6–4, [10–8]	(United Kingdom) Marcus Walters (United Kingdom) David Wright	(Greece) Ioannis Xilas (United Kingdom) Finn Murgett	(Netherlands) Jip van Assendelft (Uzbekistan) Nikita Belozertsev (Hungary) Péter Makk (Italy) Giulio Perego
October 12	Sharm El Sheikh, Egypt; Hard; M15; Singles and doubles draws	(Finland) Oskari Paldanius; 6–3, 6–4	(Belgium) Romain Faucon	(Egypt) Amr Elsayed; Artur Kukasian	Sergey Petrov; Anton Arzhankin (Germany) Aaron Funk; Saveliy Ivanov
October 12	Sharm El Sheikh, Egypt; Hard; M15; Singles and doubles draws	(Spain) Jorge Plans (Netherlands) Daniel Verbeek; 6–3, 4–6, [10–4]	(Poland) Jan Werbliński (Poland) Kacper Żuk	(Egypt) Amr Elsayed; Artur Kukasian	Sergey Petrov; Anton Arzhankin (Germany) Aaron Funk; Saveliy Ivanov
October 12	Monastir, Tunisia; Hard; M15; Singles and doubles draws	(Germany) Luca Wiedenmann; 7–6^{(8–6)}, 6–0	(France) Robin Bertrand	(Spain) Sergio Callejón Hernando (Sweden) Leo Borg	(Canada) Felix Roussel (Italy) Luca Castagnola (Algeria) Samir Hamza Reguig (France) Mathys Picard
October 12	Monastir, Tunisia; Hard; M15; Singles and doubles draws	(Thailand) Tanapatt Nirundorn (South Africa) Kris van Wyk; 6–4, 6–4	(France) Adan Freire da Silva (France) Maxence Rivet	(Spain) Sergio Callejón Hernando (Sweden) Leo Borg	(Canada) Felix Roussel (Italy) Luca Castagnola (Algeria) Samir Hamza Reguig (France) Mathys Picard
October 12	Lexington, United States; Hard; M15; Singles and doubles draws	(France) Théo Papamalamis; 2–6, 7–5, 6–2	(United States) Jack Anthrop	(United States) Eli Stephenson (Sweden) Nikola Slavic	(Netherlands) Pepijn Bastiaansen (United States) Noah Zamora (United States) Felix Corwin (Norway) Johan Oscar Lien
October 12	Lexington, United States; Hard; M15; Singles and doubles draws	Erik Arutiunian (Poland) Olaf Pieczkowski; 6–4, 3–6, [10–7]	(Denmark) Oskar Brostrøm Poulsen (Sweden) Nikola Slavic	(United States) Eli Stephenson (Sweden) Nikola Slavic	(Netherlands) Pepijn Bastiaansen (United States) Noah Zamora (United States) Felix Corwin (Norway) Johan Oscar Lien
October 12	Maringá, Brazil; Clay; M15; Singles and doubles draws	(Brazil) João Eduardo Schiessl; 6–3, 6–4	(Brazil) Pedro Sakamoto	(Paraguay) Hernando José Escurra Isnardi (Brazil) Rafael Tosetto	(Chile) Nicolás Bruna (Argentina) Julián Cúndom (Brazil) Pedro Henrique Chabalgoity (Spain) Oscar José Gutierrez
October 12	Maringá, Brazil; Clay; M15; Singles and doubles draws	(Brazil) Pedro Henrique Chabalgoity (Brazil) Francisco Fontes Damorim; 3–6, 6–4, [10–7]	(Brazil) João Victor Couto Loureiro (Brazil) Victor Pagotto	(Paraguay) Hernando José Escurra Isnardi (Brazil) Rafael Tosetto	(Chile) Nicolás Bruna (Argentina) Julián Cúndom (Brazil) Pedro Henrique Chabalgoity (Spain) Oscar José Gutierrez
October 12	Quito, Ecuador; Clay; M15; Singles and doubles draws	(Brazil) Lucas Andrade da Silva; 6–4, 7–5	(Colombia) Juan Sebastián Osorio	(Mexico) Alex Hernández (United States) Mwendwa Mbithi	(Argentina) Ivan Dreycopp (United States) Tristan McCormick (Colombia) Daniel Salazar (Colombia) Juan Sebastián Gómez
October 12	Quito, Ecuador; Clay; M15; Singles and doubles draws	(Ecuador) Patricio Alvarado (United States) Mwendwa Mbithi; 6–3, 7–5	(Colombia) Juan Sebastián Gómez (Colombia) Andrés Urrea	(Mexico) Alex Hernández (United States) Mwendwa Mbithi	(Argentina) Ivan Dreycopp (United States) Tristan McCormick (Colombia) Daniel Salazar (Colombia) Juan Sebastián Gómez
October 19	Tamworth, Australia; Hard; M25; Singles and doubles draws	(New Zealand) Isaac Becroft; 7–6^{(7–2)}, 5–7, 7–5	(Australia) Blake Ellis	(Australia) Stefan Vujic (Australia) Casey Hoole	(Australia) Matthew Dellavedova (Norway) Herman Hoeyeraal (Australia) Enzo Aguiard (Australia) Philip Sekulic
October 19	Tamworth, Australia; Hard; M25; Singles and doubles draws	(New Zealand) Isaac Becroft (New Zealand) Anton Shepp; 6–3, 6–3	(New Zealand) Cody Atkinson (Australia) Moerani Bouzige	(Australia) Stefan Vujic (Australia) Casey Hoole	(Australia) Matthew Dellavedova (Norway) Herman Hoeyeraal (Australia) Enzo Aguiard (Australia) Philip Sekulic
October 19	Mumbai, India; Hard; M25; Singles and doubles draws	(India) Karan Singh; 7–5, 3–1 ret.	(India) Digvijaypratap Singh	(India) Chirag Duhan (United States) Garrett Johns	(India) Arnav Paparkar (India) Sidharth Rawat (Japan) Ryuki Matsuda (United States) Samir Banerjee
October 19	Mumbai, India; Hard; M25; Singles and doubles draws	(India) S D Prajwal Dev (India) Nitin Kumar Sinha; 6–4, 5–7, [10–8]	(India) Adil Kalyanpur (India) Mukund Sasikumar	(India) Chirag Duhan (United States) Garrett Johns	(India) Arnav Paparkar (India) Sidharth Rawat (Japan) Ryuki Matsuda (United States) Samir Banerjee
October 19	Redbridge, United Kingdom; Hard (i); M25; Singles and doubles draws	(United Kingdom) Oliver Tarvet; 6–4, 5–7, 6–2	(United Kingdom) Paul Jubb	(United Kingdom) Patrick Brady (United Kingdom) Finn Murgett	(France) Hugo Grenier (Norway) Viktor Durasovic (United Kingdom) George Loffhagen (Germany) Mika Petkovic
October 19	Redbridge, United Kingdom; Hard (i); M25; Singles and doubles draws	(United Kingdom) Cameron Fryer (United Kingdom) Kyle McKay; 6–4, 6–7^{(7–9)}, [10–6]	(Thailand) Tanapatt Nirundorn (Spain) Pablo Pérez Ramos	(United Kingdom) Patrick Brady (United Kingdom) Finn Murgett	(France) Hugo Grenier (Norway) Viktor Durasovic (United Kingdom) George Loffhagen (Germany) Mika Petkovic
October 19	Sarreguemines, France; Carpet (i); M25; Singles and doubles draws	(France) Arthur Nagel; 4–6, 6–3, 6–3	(South Africa) Philip Henning	(France) Adrien Gobat (Germany) Maximilian Marterer	(Germany) Louis Wessels (Germany) Daniel Masur (Germany) Calvin Müller (Netherlands) Thijs Boogaard
October 19	Sarreguemines, France; Carpet (i); M25; Singles and doubles draws	(France) Arthur Nagel (Netherlands) Niels Visker; 7–6^{(7–5)}, 6–7^{(9–11)}, [10–8]	(United Kingdom) James Beaven (Germany) Tom Zeuch	(France) Adrien Gobat (Germany) Maximilian Marterer	(Germany) Louis Wessels (Germany) Daniel Masur (Germany) Calvin Müller (Netherlands) Thijs Boogaard
October 19	Santa Margherita di Pula, Italy; Clay; M25; Singles and doubles draws	(Italy) Matteo Gribaldo; 6–1, 6–3	(Germany) Adrian Oetzbach	(Italy) Lorenzo Angelini (Mexico) Luis Carlos Álvarez Valdés	(Italy) Lorenzo Carboni (Italy) Tobia Costanzo Baragiola (Italy) Andrea De Marchi; Andrey Chepelev
October 19	Santa Margherita di Pula, Italy; Clay; M25; Singles and doubles draws	(United States) Alexander Chang (Republic of Ireland) Michael Wright; 7–5, 5–7, [10–7]	(Italy) Raffaele Ciurnelli (Italy) Matteo Gribaldo	(Italy) Lorenzo Angelini (Mexico) Luis Carlos Álvarez Valdés	(Italy) Lorenzo Carboni (Italy) Tobia Costanzo Baragiola (Italy) Andrea De Marchi; Andrey Chepelev
October 19	Luanda, Angola; Hard; M25; Singles and doubles draws	(Ivory Coast) Eliakim Coulibaly; 6–2, 6–2	(Belgium) Jack Logé	(Angola) Daniel Domingos (France) Thomas Faurel	(France) Florent Bax (Ghana) Isaac Nortey (France) Louis Larue (Egypt) Fares Zakaria
October 19	Luanda, Angola; Hard; M25; Singles and doubles draws	(Zimbabwe) Courtney John Lock (Ghana) Isaac Nortey; 2–6, 6–3, [10–5]	Nikita Ianin (India) Atharva Sharma	(Angola) Daniel Domingos (France) Thomas Faurel	(France) Florent Bax (Ghana) Isaac Nortey (France) Louis Larue (Egypt) Fares Zakaria
October 19	Tanagura, Japan; Hard; M15; Singles and doubles draws	(United States) Hugo Hashimoto; 6–4, 7–6^{(7–4)}	(Japan) Yuto Oki	(Chinese Taipei) Hou Chun-chien (Japan) Takuya Kumasaka	(United Kingdom) Oscar Brown (Japan) Jumpei Yamasaki (Japan) Hyu Kawanishi (Japan) Yusuke Kusuhara
October 19	Tanagura, Japan; Hard; M15; Singles and doubles draws	(Japan) Sora Fukuda (Japan) Masakatsu Noguchi; 6–3, 3–6, [12–10]	(Japan) Shinji Hazawa (Japan) Hikaru Shiraishi	(Chinese Taipei) Hou Chun-chien (Japan) Takuya Kumasaka	(United Kingdom) Oscar Brown (Japan) Jumpei Yamasaki (Japan) Hyu Kawanishi (Japan) Yusuke Kusuhara
October 19	Shenzhen, China; Hard; M15; Singles and doubles draws	Mikalai Haliak; 6–2, 6–2	(Switzerland) Luca Staeheli	(Serbia) Boris Butulija (Poland) Filip Peliwo	(Armenia) Daniil Sarksian (China) Xiao Linang (Chinese Taipei) Chen Kuan-shou (Chinese Taipei) Lin Hao-yu
October 19	Shenzhen, China; Hard; M15; Singles and doubles draws	(Armenia) Daniil Sarksian (Uzbekistan) Maxim Shin; 2–6, 6–3, [10–5]	(China) Chen Xingdao (China) Dong Zhenxiong	(Serbia) Boris Butulija (Poland) Filip Peliwo	(Armenia) Daniil Sarksian (China) Xiao Linang (Chinese Taipei) Chen Kuan-shou (Chinese Taipei) Lin Hao-yu
October 19	Singapore; Hard (i); M15; Singles and doubles draws	(Turkey) Ergi Kırkın; 6–3, 7–6^{(7–3)}	(France) Maxime Janvier	(Japan) Kosuke Ogura (Japan) Taisei Ichikawa	(India) Pranav Karthik (United Kingdom) Ali Habib (Italy) Lorenzo Lorusso (Thailand) Thantub Suksumrarn
October 19	Singapore; Hard (i); M15; Singles and doubles draws	(Japan) Tomohiro Masabayashi (Thailand) Thantub Suksumrarn; 1–6, 7–6^{(12–10)}, [10–8]	(Japan) Kazuma Kawachi (Japan) Kosuke Ogura	(Japan) Kosuke Ogura (Japan) Taisei Ichikawa	(India) Pranav Karthik (United Kingdom) Ali Habib (Italy) Lorenzo Lorusso (Thailand) Thantub Suksumrarn
October 19	Bol, Croatia; Clay; M15; Singles and doubles draws	(Ukraine) Viacheslav Bielinskyi; 6–3, 7–6^{(7–5)}	(Spain) Imanol López Morillo	(France) Geoffrey Blancaneaux (Austria) Nico Hipfl	(Italy) Giannicola Misasi (Poland) Alan Ważny (Belgium) Alessio Basile (Bosnia and Herzegovina) Ivan Biletić
October 19	Bol, Croatia; Clay; M15; Singles and doubles draws	(France) Charles Bertimon (France) Geoffrey Blancaneaux; 6–2, 3–6, [10–2]	(Poland) Piotr Galus (Czech Republic) Patrik Homola	(France) Geoffrey Blancaneaux (Austria) Nico Hipfl	(Italy) Giannicola Misasi (Poland) Alan Ważny (Belgium) Alessio Basile (Bosnia and Herzegovina) Ivan Biletić
October 19	Heraklion, Greece; Hard; M15; Singles and doubles draws	(Israel) Amit Vales; 6–2, 6–3	(Romania) Cezar Crețu	(Netherlands) Fons van Sambeek (Greece) Ioannis Xilas	(Czech Republic) Jakub Filip (France) Benjamin Pietri (Argentina) Julio César Porras (Slovenia) Luka Talan Lopatić
October 19	Heraklion, Greece; Hard; M15; Singles and doubles draws	(Germany) Michel Hopp (United States) Matthew Thomson; Walkover	(Greece) Markos Kalovelonis (Greece) Petros Tsitsipas	(Netherlands) Fons van Sambeek (Greece) Ioannis Xilas	(Czech Republic) Jakub Filip (France) Benjamin Pietri (Argentina) Julio César Porras (Slovenia) Luka Talan Lopatić
October 19	Sharm El Sheikh, Egypt; Hard; M15; Singles and doubles draws	(Turkey) Arda Azkara; 2–6, 6–4, 6–3	(Finland) Oskari Paldanius	(Czech Republic) Marek Gengel; Sergey Petrov	(Romania) Tudor Batin (Netherlands) Pieter de Lange (Ukraine) Volodymyr Iakubenko (France) Constantin Bittoun Kouzmine
October 19	Sharm El Sheikh, Egypt; Hard; M15; Singles and doubles draws	Ivan Gretskiy; Andrei Kunitsyn; 6–3, 4–6, [10–8]	(Turkey) Melih Anavatan (Turkey) S Mert Özdemir	(Czech Republic) Marek Gengel; Sergey Petrov	(Romania) Tudor Batin (Netherlands) Pieter de Lange (Ukraine) Volodymyr Iakubenko (France) Constantin Bittoun Kouzmine
October 19	Monastir, Tunisia; Hard; M15; Singles and doubles draws	(Germany) Liam Gavrielides; 4–6, 6–3, 7–5	(Iran) Kasra Rahmani	(France) Robin Bertrand (France) Ferdinand Livet Novkirichka	(France) Maxence Rivet (Italy) Simone Massellani (China) Fnu Nidunjianzan (Algeria) Mohamed Nazim Makhlouf
October 19	Monastir, Tunisia; Hard; M15; Singles and doubles draws	(France) Robin Bertrand (South Africa) Kris van Wyk; 5–7, 7–6^{(8–6)}, [10–8]	(Turkey) Kaan Işık Koşaner (Italy) Simone Massellani	(France) Robin Bertrand (France) Ferdinand Livet Novkirichka	(France) Maxence Rivet (Italy) Simone Massellani (China) Fnu Nidunjianzan (Algeria) Mohamed Nazim Makhlouf
October 19	Ithaca, United States; Hard (i); M15; Singles and doubles draws	(Portugal) Rodrigo Fernandes; 6–3, 6–1	(United States) Jack Anthrop	(Estonia) Oliver Ojakäär (Sweden) Rafael Ymer	(Netherlands) Alec Deckers (Canada) Nicolas Arseneault (United States) Jack Secord (United States) Vignesh Gogineni
October 19	Ithaca, United States; Hard (i); M15; Singles and doubles draws	(United States) Nathan Cox (Estonia) Oliver Ojakäär; 7–5, 7–6^{(9–7)}	(Sweden) Mans Dahlberg (Hungary) Zsombor Velcz	(Estonia) Oliver Ojakäär (Sweden) Rafael Ymer	(Netherlands) Alec Deckers (Canada) Nicolas Arseneault (United States) Jack Secord (United States) Vignesh Gogineni
October 19	Maceió, Brazil; Clay (i); M15; Singles and doubles draws	(Brazil) Pedro Sakamoto; 4–6, 6–3, 6–4	(Brazil) João Victor Couto Loureiro	(Brazil) Kaua Lorenzo Santos Gava (Argentina) Lorenzo Gagliardo	(Argentina) Tomás Farjat (Brazil) Leonardo Storck França (Spain) Oscar José Gutierrez (Argentina) Dante Pagani
October 19	Maceió, Brazil; Clay (i); M15; Singles and doubles draws	(Brazil) Pedro Henrique Chabalgoity (Brazil) Francisco Fontes Damorim; 7–5, 6–3	(Argentina) Tomás Farjat (Argentina) Tomas Martinez	(Brazil) Kaua Lorenzo Santos Gava (Argentina) Lorenzo Gagliardo	(Argentina) Tomás Farjat (Brazil) Leonardo Storck França (Spain) Oscar José Gutierrez (Argentina) Dante Pagani
October 26	Tamworth, Australia; Hard; M25; Singles and doubles draws	(Australia) Matthew Dellavedova; 4–6, 6–3, 6–4	(Australia) Philip Sekulic	(Australia) Jeremy Beale (Australia) Blake Ellis	(New Zealand) Isaac Becroft (Australia) Sam Ryan Ziegann (New Zealand) Anton Shepp (Australia) Tai Sach
October 26	Tamworth, Australia; Hard; M25; Singles and doubles draws	(New Zealand) Isaac Becroft (New Zealand) Anton Shepp; 6–2, 6–3	(Australia) Chen Dong (Australia) Tai Sach	(Australia) Jeremy Beale (Australia) Blake Ellis	(New Zealand) Isaac Becroft (Australia) Sam Ryan Ziegann (New Zealand) Anton Shepp (Australia) Tai Sach
October 26	Sheffield, United Kingdom; Hard (i); M25; Singles and doubles draws	(United Kingdom) Oliver Tarvet; 6–0, 6–0	(France) Matt Ponchet	(Norway) Viktor Durasovic (United Kingdom) Liam Hignett	(United Kingdom) Roan Jones (Germany) Mika Petkovic (United Kingdom) Johannus Monday (Czech Republic) Martin Krumich
October 26	Sheffield, United Kingdom; Hard (i); M25; Singles and doubles draws	(Canada) Jared Horwood (United Kingdom) Rhys Lawlor; 2–6, 6–4, [10–6]	(United Kingdom) Cameron Fryer (United Kingdom) Kyle McKay	(Norway) Viktor Durasovic (United Kingdom) Liam Hignett	(United Kingdom) Roan Jones (Germany) Mika Petkovic (United Kingdom) Johannus Monday (Czech Republic) Martin Krumich
October 26	Marsa, Malta; Hard; M25; Singles and doubles draws	(Ukraine) Georgii Kravchenko; 6–4, 7–6^{(7–4)}	(Germany) Daniel Masur	(United Kingdom) James MacKinlay (United States) Garrett Johns	(Kazakhstan) Dmitry Popko (Latvia) Robert Strombachs (Ukraine) Aleksandr Braynin (Romania) Cezar Crețu
October 26	Marsa, Malta; Hard; M25; Singles and doubles draws	(Cyprus) Eleftherios Neos (Greece) Petros Tsitsipas; 7–6^{(7–5)}, 3–6, [13–11]	(United Kingdom) Matthew Howse (United Kingdom) James MacKinlay	(United Kingdom) James MacKinlay (United States) Garrett Johns	(Kazakhstan) Dmitry Popko (Latvia) Robert Strombachs (Ukraine) Aleksandr Braynin (Romania) Cezar Crețu
October 26	Las Vegas, United States; Hard; M25; Singles and doubles draws	(Spain) Andrés Santamarta Roig; 3–6, 6–2, 6–1	(United States) Jerry Roddick	(United States) Jack Anthrop (United States) Nikita Filin	(United States) Tanishk Konduri (United States) Aidan Kim (United States) Preston Stearns (United Kingdom) William Jansen
October 26	Las Vegas, United States; Hard; M25; Singles and doubles draws	(United States) Jack Anthrop (United States) Noah Zamora; 7–6^{(10–8)}, 4–6, [10–8]	(United Kingdom) Oliver Okonkwo (United States) Jack Vance	(United States) Jack Anthrop (United States) Nikita Filin	(United States) Tanishk Konduri (United States) Aidan Kim (United States) Preston Stearns (United Kingdom) William Jansen
October 26	Norman, United States; Hard; M25; Singles and doubles draws	(United Kingdom) Lui Maxted; 6–7^{(1–7)}, 7–5, 6–3	(United States) Tyler Zink	(United Kingdom) Alastair Gray (Slovenia) Filip Jeff Planinšek	(United Kingdom) Luca Pow (United States) Bruno Kuzuhara (Slovenia) Bor Artnak (Colombia) Johan Alexander Rodríguez
October 26	Norman, United States; Hard; M25; Singles and doubles draws	(Japan) Asahi Harazaki (United States) Spencer Papa; Walkover	(United Kingdom) Giles Hussey (United Kingdom) Aidan McHugh	(United Kingdom) Alastair Gray (Slovenia) Filip Jeff Planinšek	(United Kingdom) Luca Pow (United States) Bruno Kuzuhara (Slovenia) Bor Artnak (Colombia) Johan Alexander Rodríguez
October 26	Yanagawa, Japan; Hard; M15; Singles and doubles draws	(Japan) Hikaru Shiraishi; 6–4, 6–2	(Japan) Taiyo Yamanaka	(Japan) Yuto Oki (Japan) Shinji Hazawa	(Japan) Jumpei Yamasaki (Japan) Yuta Tomida (Japan) Takuya Kumasaka (Thailand) Markus Malaszszak
October 26	Yanagawa, Japan; Hard; M15; Singles and doubles draws	(Japan) Noritaka Koizumi (Japan) Yua Taka; 6–3, 7–5	(Japan) Kazuma Kawachi (Japan) Taiyo Yamanaka	(Japan) Yuto Oki (Japan) Shinji Hazawa	(Japan) Jumpei Yamasaki (Japan) Yuta Tomida (Japan) Takuya Kumasaka (Thailand) Markus Malaszszak
October 26	Singapore; Hard (i); M15; Singles and doubles draws	(France) Maxime Janvier; 3–6, 7–5, 7–6^{(7–4)}	(Indonesia) Muhammad Rifqi Fitriadi	(India) Madhwin Kamath (United States) Adhithya Ganesan	(Thailand) Yuttana Charoenphon (Japan) Yuichiro Inui (South Korea) Han Seon-yong (India) Pranav Karthik
October 26	Singapore; Hard (i); M15; Singles and doubles draws	(Japan) Kosuke Ogura (Estonia) Kristjan Tamm; 6–4, 6–4	(Indonesia) Muhammad Rifqi Fitriadi (South Korea) Han Seon-yong	(India) Madhwin Kamath (United States) Adhithya Ganesan	(Thailand) Yuttana Charoenphon (Japan) Yuichiro Inui (South Korea) Han Seon-yong (India) Pranav Karthik
October 26	Fergana, Uzbekistan; Hard; M15; Singles and doubles draws	Aristarkh Safonov; 7–6^{(7–4)}, 6–7^{(5–7)}, 6–2	(India) Digvijaypratap Singh	(Germany) David Eichenseher (Kazakhstan) Amir Omarkhanov	Dmitry Bessonov; Grigory Shebekin (Germany) Calvin Müller (Italy) Edoardo Cherie Ligniere
October 26	Fergana, Uzbekistan; Hard; M15; Singles and doubles draws	(Czech Republic) Jan Hrazdil (India) Aryan Lakshmanan; 7–5, 6–1	Dmitrii Burtsev; Kirill Filaretov	(Germany) David Eichenseher (Kazakhstan) Amir Omarkhanov	Dmitry Bessonov; Grigory Shebekin (Germany) Calvin Müller (Italy) Edoardo Cherie Ligniere
October 26	Sëlva Gardena, Italy; Hard (i); M15; Singles and doubles draws	(Italy) Giovanni Oradini; 6–3, 6–4	(Italy) Simone Massellani	(Italy) Manuel Plunger (Italy) Lorenzo Bocchi	(Poland) Wojciech Marek (Italy) Andrea Colombo (United States) Jake Fellows (Italy) Maximilian Figl
October 26	Sëlva Gardena, Italy; Hard (i); M15; Singles and doubles draws	(Italy) Jacopo Bilardo (Italy) Lorenzo Rottoli; 7–5, 6–1	(Italy) Lorenzo Bocchi (Italy) Raffaele Ciurnelli	(Italy) Manuel Plunger (Italy) Lorenzo Bocchi	(Poland) Wojciech Marek (Italy) Andrea Colombo (United States) Jake Fellows (Italy) Maximilian Figl
October 26	Heraklion, Greece; Hard; M15; Singles and doubles draws	(United States) Miles Jones; 7–5, 6–0	(France) Benjamin Pietri	(United States) Alexander Chang (Spain) Pablo Pérez Ramos	(Ukraine) Nikita Mashtakov (Poland) Jan Sadzik (Germany) Michel Hopp (South Africa) Thando Longwe-Smit
October 26	Heraklion, Greece; Hard; M15; Singles and doubles draws	(Spain) Pablo Pérez Ramos (Republic of Ireland) Michael Wright; 6–3, 6–1	(United States) Alex Jones (United States) Miles Jones	(United States) Alexander Chang (Spain) Pablo Pérez Ramos	(Ukraine) Nikita Mashtakov (Poland) Jan Sadzik (Germany) Michel Hopp (South Africa) Thando Longwe-Smit
October 26	Sharm El Sheikh, Egypt; Hard; M15; Singles and doubles draws	(Ukraine) Yurii Dzhavakian; 7–6^{(7–4)}, 6–3	(Netherlands) Gijs Brouwer	(Germany) Jannik Maute (Ukraine) Volodymyr Iakubenko	(Egypt) Amr Elsayed (Germany) Aaron Funk (Belgium) Benoit Torcq (France) Constantin Bittoun Kouzmine
October 26	Sharm El Sheikh, Egypt; Hard; M15; Singles and doubles draws	(India) Atharva Sharma (India) Karan Singh; 7–6^{(10–8)}, 6–4	Nikita Ianin (Egypt) Karim Ibrahim	(Germany) Jannik Maute (Ukraine) Volodymyr Iakubenko	(Egypt) Amr Elsayed (Germany) Aaron Funk (Belgium) Benoit Torcq (France) Constantin Bittoun Kouzmine
October 26	Monastir, Tunisia; Hard; M15; Singles and doubles draws	(France) Lilian Marmousez; 6–4, 6–1	(Tunisia) Aziz Ouakaa	(France) Nicolas Tepmahc (Germany) Benito Sanchez Martinez	(France) Sven Corbinais (France) Nicolas Jadoun (South Africa) Kris van Wyk (Turkey) Tuncay Duran
October 26	Monastir, Tunisia; Hard; M15; Singles and doubles draws	(Germany) Tim Hammes (Germany) Benito Sanchez Martinez; 6–4, 7–6^{(7–4)}	(France) César Bouchelaghem (Belgium) Lars Goran Verwerft	(France) Nicolas Tepmahc (Germany) Benito Sanchez Martinez	(France) Sven Corbinais (France) Nicolas Jadoun (South Africa) Kris van Wyk (Turkey) Tuncay Duran
October 26	Pembroke, Bermuda; Hard; M15; Singles and doubles draws	(Jamaica) Blaise Bicknell; 6–2, 6–2	(Poland) Kacper Szymkowiak	(Canada) Alvin Nicholas Tudorica (United States) Jacob Brumm	(United States) Noah Schachter (France) Paul Colin (United States) Matt Kuhar (United States) Keshav Chopra
October 26	Pembroke, Bermuda; Hard; M15; Singles and doubles draws	(United States) Keshav Chopra (United States) Matt Kuhar; 6–4, 6–2	(United States) Nathan Cox (United States) Jeffrey Fradkin	(Canada) Alvin Nicholas Tudorica (United States) Jacob Brumm	(United States) Noah Schachter (France) Paul Colin (United States) Matt Kuhar (United States) Keshav Chopra
October 26	Mazatlán, Mexico; Hard; M15; Singles and doubles draws	(Colombia) Frazier Rengifo; 7–6^{(7–5)}, 7–6^{(7–5)}	(Mexico) Rodrigo Alujas	(Chile) Matías Soto (Mexico) Rafael De Alba	(Nicaragua) Joaquín Guilleme (Italy) Matteo Covato (United States) Maxwell McKennon (United States) Lucca Liu
October 26	Mazatlán, Mexico; Hard; M15; Singles and doubles draws	(Chile) Anders Matta (Canada) Joshua Peck; 6–3, 6–4	(Mexico) Ian Luca Cervantes Tomas (Mexico) Oswaldo Alejandro Reyes Tirado	(Chile) Matías Soto (Mexico) Rafael De Alba	(Nicaragua) Joaquín Guilleme (Italy) Matteo Covato (United States) Maxwell McKennon (United States) Lucca Liu
October 26	João Pessoa, Brazil; Clay; M15; Singles and doubles draws	(Spain) Oscar José Gutierrez; 6–7^{(6–8)}, 6–1, 6–4	(Argentina) Tomas Martinez	(Argentina) Ignacio Monzón (Brazil) Pedro Sakamoto	(Argentina) Dante Pagani (Chile) Nicolás Bruna (Argentina) Fermín Tenti (Brazil) João Victor Couto Loureiro
October 26	João Pessoa, Brazil; Clay; M15; Singles and doubles draws	(Argentina) Julián Cúndom (Argentina) Fermín Tenti; 3–6, 7–6^{(9–7)}, [10–3]	(Brazil) Kaue Noatto (Brazil) Rafael Tosetto	(Argentina) Ignacio Monzón (Brazil) Pedro Sakamoto	(Argentina) Dante Pagani (Chile) Nicolás Bruna (Argentina) Fermín Tenti (Brazil) João Victor Couto Loureiro

=== November ===
Week of	Tournament	Winner	Runners-up	Semifinalists	Quarterfinalists
November 2	Valencia, Spain; Clay; M25; Singles and doubles draws	Ivan Gakhov; 6–7^{(5–7)}, 7–6^{(7–3)}, 6–2	(Venezuela) Ignacio Parisca	(Spain) Sergi Pérez Contri (Slovenia) Luka Talan Lopatić	(Italy) Samuele Pieri; Svyatoslav Gulin (Bulgaria) Iliyan Radulov (Spain) Alberto Barroso Campos
November 2	Valencia, Spain; Clay; M25; Singles and doubles draws	(Spain) Alberto Barroso Campos (Spain) Bruno Pujol Navarro; 7–6^{(7–5)}, 7–6^{(7–4)}	(Spain) Alejandro García Carbajal (Spain) Mario Mansilla Díez	(Spain) Sergi Pérez Contri (Slovenia) Luka Talan Lopatić	(Italy) Samuele Pieri; Svyatoslav Gulin (Bulgaria) Iliyan Radulov (Spain) Alberto Barroso Campos
November 2	Heraklion, Greece; Hard; M25; Singles and doubles draws	(Belgium) Gilles-Arnaud Bailly; 6–2, 6–4	(Romania) Cezar Crețu	(Greece) Ioannis Xilas (France) Robin Bertrand	(Bosnia and Herzegovina) Andrej Nedić (United States) Miles Jones (France) Alexandre Aubriot (Cyprus) Melios Efstathiou
November 2	Heraklion, Greece; Hard; M25; Singles and doubles draws	(Netherlands) Mats Hermans (Germany) Kai Wehnelt; 6–4, 6–2	(Spain) Pablo Pérez Ramos (Republic of Ireland) Michael Wright	(Greece) Ioannis Xilas (France) Robin Bertrand	(Bosnia and Herzegovina) Andrej Nedić (United States) Miles Jones (France) Alexandre Aubriot (Cyprus) Melios Efstathiou
November 2	Harlingen, United States; Hard; M25; Singles and doubles draws	(Slovenia) Bor Artnak; 6–1, 4–6, 6–3	(Namibia) Connor Henry van Schalkwyk	(United States) Kaylan Bigun (United States) Keaton Hance	(United States) Hunter Heck (United States) Bryce Nakashima (United Kingdom) Aidan McHugh (United States) Samir Banerjee
November 2	Harlingen, United States; Hard; M25; Singles and doubles draws	(Romania) Ioan Alexandru Chiriță (Hungary) Zsombor Velcz; 2–6, 6–4, [10–5]	(Germany) Erik Schiessl (Namibia) Connor Henry van Schalkwyk	(United States) Kaylan Bigun (United States) Keaton Hance	(United States) Hunter Heck (United States) Bryce Nakashima (United Kingdom) Aidan McHugh (United States) Samir Banerjee
November 2	Guadalajara, Mexico; Clay; M25; Singles and doubles draws	(Mexico) Luis Carlos Álvarez Valdés; 6–3, 6–2	(Italy) Lorenzo Claverie	(United Kingdom) Blu Baker (Mexico) Rodrigo Pacheco Méndez	(Mexico) Rafael de Alba (Mexico) Alan Fernando Rubio Fierros (United States) Maxwell McKennon (Costa Rica) Jesse Flores
November 2	Guadalajara, Mexico; Clay; M25; Singles and doubles draws	(Mexico) Luis Carlos Álvarez Valdés (Costa Rica) Jesse Flores; Walkover	(Colombia) Frazier Rengifo (Colombia) Nicolas Esteban Rico Arias	(United Kingdom) Blu Baker (Mexico) Rodrigo Pacheco Méndez	(Mexico) Rafael de Alba (Mexico) Alan Fernando Rubio Fierros (United States) Maxwell McKennon (Costa Rica) Jesse Flores
November 2	Ma'anshan, China; Hard (i); M15; Singles and doubles draws	(China) Te Rigele; 6–4, 6–4	(Estonia) Kristjan Tamm	(United Kingdom) Millen Hurrion (South Korea) Hong Seong-chan	(China) Han Xirui (China) Zhang Tianhui (Armenia) Daniil Sarksian; Maxim Zhukov
November 2	Ma'anshan, China; Hard (i); M15; Singles and doubles draws	(South Korea) Jeong Yeong-seok (China) Yang Zijiang; 6–3, 2–6, [11–9]	(United Kingdom) James Connel (Thailand) Pawit Sornlaksup	(United Kingdom) Millen Hurrion (South Korea) Hong Seong-chan	(China) Han Xirui (China) Zhang Tianhui (Armenia) Daniil Sarksian; Maxim Zhukov
November 2	Fergana, Uzbekistan; Hard; M15; Singles and doubles draws	Dmitry Bessonov; 6–2, 7–5	(India) Digvijaypratap Singh	(Italy) Edoardo Cherie Ligniere (India) Chirag Duhan	Aristarkh Safonov (Germany) David Eichenseher; Oleg Kolninov (Australia) Adrian Arcon
November 2	Fergana, Uzbekistan; Hard; M15; Singles and doubles draws	(Czech Republic) Jan Hrazdil (India) Aryan Lakshmanan; 6–3, 6–3	Dmitry Bessonov; Roman Kharlamov	(Italy) Edoardo Cherie Ligniere (India) Chirag Duhan	Aristarkh Safonov (Germany) David Eichenseher; Oleg Kolninov (Australia) Adrian Arcon
November 2	San Gregorio di Catania, Italy; Clay; M15; Singles and doubles draws	(Italy) Michele Mecarelli; 6–3, 6–2	(Italy) Gianmarco Ferrari	(Italy) Andrea De Marchi (Czech Republic) Štěpán Baum	(France) Maxence Bertimon (Italy) Gabriele Crivellaro (Italy) Simone Massucco (Germany) John Sperle
November 2	San Gregorio di Catania, Italy; Clay; M15; Singles and doubles draws	(Italy) Raffaele Ciurnelli (Italy) Matteo Gribaldo; 6–2, 6–3	(Italy) Alessandro Battiston (Italy) Francesco Ferrari	(Italy) Andrea De Marchi (Czech Republic) Štěpán Baum	(France) Maxence Bertimon (Italy) Gabriele Crivellaro (Italy) Simone Massucco (Germany) John Sperle
November 2	Antalya, Türkiye; Clay; M15; Singles and doubles draws	(Romania) Filip Cristian Jianu; 6–4, 6–4	(Italy) Mattia Nannelli	(Belgium) Martin van der Meerschen (Romania) Ștefan Adrian Andreescu	(Ukraine) Heorhii Shylov (Serbia) Vuk Radjenovic (Sweden) Dragoș Nicolae Mădăraș; Andrey Chepelev
November 2	Antalya, Türkiye; Clay; M15; Singles and doubles draws	Andrey Chepelev; Mikhail Fufygin; 3–6, 6–4, [10–6]	(Belgium) Alessio Basile (Belgium) Martin van der Meerschen	(Belgium) Martin van der Meerschen (Romania) Ștefan Adrian Andreescu	(Ukraine) Heorhii Shylov (Serbia) Vuk Radjenovic (Sweden) Dragoș Nicolae Mădăraș; Andrey Chepelev
November 2	Sharm El Sheikh, Egypt; Hard; M15; Singles and doubles draws	(Egypt) Omar Kandil; 6–2, 7–5	(Belgium) Nicolas Ifi	(Georgia (country)) Aleksandre Bakshi (Netherlands) Sidane Pontjodikromo	(Luxembourg) Louis van Herck (South Africa) John Bothma (United Kingdom) Oscar Weightman; Artur Kukasian
November 2	Sharm El Sheikh, Egypt; Hard; M15; Singles and doubles draws	(Turkey) Melih Anavatan (Turkey) S Mert Özdemir; 7–6^{(7–4)}, 6–2	(Georgia (country)) Aleksandre Bakshi (Georgia (country)) Saba Purtseladze	(Georgia (country)) Aleksandre Bakshi (Netherlands) Sidane Pontjodikromo	(Luxembourg) Louis van Herck (South Africa) John Bothma (United Kingdom) Oscar Weightman; Artur Kukasian
November 2	Monastir, Tunisia; Hard; M15; Singles and doubles draws	(Spain) Alejandro Moro Cañas; 6–3, 6–3	(Tunisia) Wissam Abderrahman	(Croatia) Duje Ajduković (Tunisia) Aziz Dougaz	(Spain) John Echeverría (France) César Bouchelaghem (Algeria) Toufik Sahtali (Algeria) Mohamed Nazim Makhlouf
November 2	Monastir, Tunisia; Hard; M15; Singles and doubles draws	(Tunisia) Wissam Abderrahman (Tunisia) Aziz Ouakaa; 6–3, 6–1	(Algeria) Mohamed Ali Abibsi (Italy) Alessandro Mondazzi	(Croatia) Duje Ajduković (Tunisia) Aziz Dougaz	(Spain) John Echeverría (France) César Bouchelaghem (Algeria) Toufik Sahtali (Algeria) Mohamed Nazim Makhlouf
November 2	Pembroke, Bermuda; Hard; M15; Singles and doubles draws	(Poland) Kacper Szymkowiak; 6–4, 6–7^{(4–7)}, 7–6^{(7–2)}	(Jamaica) Blaise Bicknell	(United States) Nathan Cox (United States) Keshav Chopra	(United States) Alexander Bernard (United States) Rohan Sachdev (United States) Matt Kuhar (United States) Gray Voelzke
November 2	Pembroke, Bermuda; Hard; M15; Singles and doubles draws	(Guatemala) Juan Dominguez Collado (Curaçao) Aydan Gomez Osorio; 7–6^{(7–2)}, 6–3	(United States) Jeffrey Fradkin (United States) Gray Voelzke	(United States) Nathan Cox (United States) Keshav Chopra	(United States) Alexander Bernard (United States) Rohan Sachdev (United States) Matt Kuhar (United States) Gray Voelzke
November 2	Trois-Rivières, Canada; Hard (i); M15; Singles and doubles draws	(Norway) Johan Oscar Lien; 6–4, 6–3	(Sweden) Nikola Slavic	(Canada) Mikael Arseneault (Romania) Eric David Verdeș	(Canada) Maxime St-Hilaire (Denmark) Oskar Brostrøm Poulsen (United States) Theodore Dean (Netherlands) Daniel de Jonge
November 2	Trois-Rivières, Canada; Hard (i); M15; Singles and doubles draws	(Denmark) Oskar Brostrøm Poulsen (Sweden) Nikola Slavic; 6–2, 3–6, [10–2]	(United States) Theodore Dean (United States) Aadarsh Tripathi	(Canada) Mikael Arseneault (Romania) Eric David Verdeș	(Canada) Maxime St-Hilaire (Denmark) Oskar Brostrøm Poulsen (United States) Theodore Dean (Netherlands) Daniel de Jonge
November 2	Hilton Head Island, United States; Clay; M15; Singles and doubles draws	(Romania) Dragoș Nicolae Cazacu; 6–0, 6–2	(Italy) William Mirarchi	(United States) Gavin Goode (United States) Max Sheldon	(United States) Ryan Colby (Spain) Julian Alonso (United States) Anuj Watane (United States) Felix Corwin
November 2	Hilton Head Island, United States; Clay; M15; Singles and doubles draws	(United States) Kayden Colombo (United States) Jerrod Gaines Jr. 6–3, 7–6^{(7–1)}	(Brazil) Joaquim Almeida (United States) Leonardo Vega	(United States) Gavin Goode (United States) Max Sheldon	(United States) Ryan Colby (Spain) Julian Alonso (United States) Anuj Watane (United States) Felix Corwin
November 2	Salvador, Brazil; Hard; M15; Singles and doubles draws	(Bolivia) Agustín Eduardo Cuéllar Lorberg; 7–6^{(7–3)}, 2–6, 6–1	(Spain) Oscar José Gutierrez	(Brazil) João Vítor Gonçalves Ceolin (Argentina) Giovanni Branchetti	(Brazil) João Vítor Scramin do Lago (Brazil) Victor Bini (Argentina) Julián Cúndom (Chile) Benjamín Torrealba
November 2	Salvador, Brazil; Hard; M15; Singles and doubles draws	(Brazil) Victor Braga (Argentina) Manuel Mouilleron Salvo; 6–4, 6–4	(Brazil) Jackson Pereira Xavier (Brazil) Glauco Pinheiro da Cruz Junior	(Brazil) João Vítor Gonçalves Ceolin (Argentina) Giovanni Branchetti	(Brazil) João Vítor Scramin do Lago (Brazil) Victor Bini (Argentina) Julián Cúndom (Chile) Benjamín Torrealba
November 9	Vale do Lobo, Portugal; Hard; M25; Singles and doubles draws	Pavel Lagutin; 2–6, 6–4, 6–1	(France) Daniel Jade	(Switzerland) Patrick Schoen (Austria) Sebastian Sorger	(Spain) Mario González Fernández (United States) Tyler Zink (Bulgaria) Ivan Ivanov (Portugal) Gonçalo Marques
November 9	Vale do Lobo, Portugal; Hard; M25; Singles and doubles draws	(Spain) Pablo Pérez Ramos (Republic of Ireland) Michael Wright; 6–4, 6–3	(Portugal) Vasco Leote Prata (Portugal) Diogo Morais	(Switzerland) Patrick Schoen (Austria) Sebastian Sorger	(Spain) Mario González Fernández (United States) Tyler Zink (Bulgaria) Ivan Ivanov (Portugal) Gonçalo Marques
November 9	San Gregorio di Catania, Italy; Clay; M25; Singles and doubles draws	(Italy) Raffaele Ciurnelli; 7–6^{(9–7)}, 6–2	(Italy) Luca Potenza	(Spain) Àlex Martí Pujolràs (Italy) Giuseppe La Vela	(Italy) Samuele Pieri (Ukraine) Oleksandr Ovcharenko (Romania) Radu David Țurcanu (Italy) Matteo Gribaldo
November 9	San Gregorio di Catania, Italy; Clay; M25; Singles and doubles draws	(Italy) Luca Potenza (Italy) Giorgio Tabacco; 6–2, 6–3	(Italy) Federico Iannaccone (Ukraine) Oleksandr Ovcharenko	(Spain) Àlex Martí Pujolràs (Italy) Giuseppe La Vela	(Italy) Samuele Pieri (Ukraine) Oleksandr Ovcharenko (Romania) Radu David Țurcanu (Italy) Matteo Gribaldo
November 9	Montreal, Canada; Hard (i); M25; Singles and doubles draws	(Germany) Maximilian Marterer; 6–1, 5–7, 7–6^{(7–2)}	(United States) Cannon Kingsley	(United States) Theodore Dean (Denmark) Oskar Brostrøm Poulsen	(Germany) Max Wiskandt (Canada) Mikael Arseneault (Germany) Jannik Opitz (Canada) Nicolas Arseneault
November 9	Montreal, Canada; Hard (i); M25; Singles and doubles draws	(Denmark) Oskar Brostrøm Poulsen (Sweden) Nikola Slavic; 6–2, 4–6, [10–6]	(Netherlands) Daniel de Jonge (Germany) Jannik Opitz	(United States) Theodore Dean (Denmark) Oskar Brostrøm Poulsen	(Germany) Max Wiskandt (Canada) Mikael Arseneault (Germany) Jannik Opitz (Canada) Nicolas Arseneault
November 9	Columbus, United States; Hard (i); M25; Singles and doubles draws	(United States) Jack Anthrop; 1–6, 6–2, 6–0	(France) Raphael Perot	(Slovenia) Bor Artnak (United States) Matthew Forbes	(United States) Victor Lilov (France) Théo Papamalamis (Israel) Ofek Shimanov (Netherlands) Alec Deckers
November 9	Columbus, United States; Hard (i); M25; Singles and doubles draws	(United States) Matthew Forbes (United Kingdom) Alexander Okonkwo; 7–6^{(7–1)}, 6–3	(United States) Jack Anthrop (United States) Preston Stearns	(Slovenia) Bor Artnak (United States) Matthew Forbes	(United States) Victor Lilov (France) Théo Papamalamis (Israel) Ofek Shimanov (Netherlands) Alec Deckers
November 9	Santa Cruz do Sul, Brazil; Clay (i); M25; Singles and doubles draws	(Argentina) Juan Bautista Torres; 6–2, 6–2	(Brazil) Pedro Sakamoto	(Argentina) Valerio Aboian (Argentina) Juan Pablo Ficovich	(Brazil) Mateus Alves (Argentina) Santiago Rodríguez Taverna (Brazil) Eduardo Ribeiro (Brazil) Pedro Boscardin Dias
November 9	Santa Cruz do Sul, Brazil; Clay (i); M25; Singles and doubles draws	(Brazil) Mateus Alves (Argentina) Santiago Rodríguez Taverna; 6–3, 6–4	(Brazil) João Victor Couto Loureiro (Brazil) Eduardo Ribeiro	(Argentina) Valerio Aboian (Argentina) Juan Pablo Ficovich	(Brazil) Mateus Alves (Argentina) Santiago Rodríguez Taverna (Brazil) Eduardo Ribeiro (Brazil) Pedro Boscardin Dias
November 9	Ma'anshan, China; Hard (i); M15; Singles and doubles draws	(China) Te Rigele; 7–6^{(7–2)}, 6–2	(China) Tang Sheng	(Japan) Noritaka Koizumi (China) Zhao Zhao	(United Kingdom) James Connel (China) Xia Yue (United States) Jordan Chiu (South Korea) Kim Dong-ju
November 9	Ma'anshan, China; Hard (i); M15; Singles and doubles draws	(China) Jin Yuquan (China) Sun Qian; 6–3, 6–7^{(2–7)}, [10–5]	(South Korea) Jeong Yeong-seok (China) Yang Zijiang	(Japan) Noritaka Koizumi (China) Zhao Zhao	(United Kingdom) James Connel (China) Xia Yue (United States) Jordan Chiu (South Korea) Kim Dong-ju
November 9	Hua Hin, Thailand; Hard; M15; Singles and doubles draws	(Turkey) Ergi Kırkın; 7–6^{(11–9)}, 4–6, 6–3	(Kazakhstan) Denis Yevseyev	(Hong Kong) Wong Tsz-fu (South Korea) Shin San-hui	(Netherlands) Fons van Sambeek (Thailand) Thanapet Chanta (United Kingdom) Oscar Brown (Chinese Taipei) Chen Kuan-shou
November 9	Hua Hin, Thailand; Hard; M15; Singles and doubles draws	(Thailand) Thanapet Chanta (Thailand) Pawit Sornlaksup; 6–2, 6–0	(Chinese Taipei) Huang Tsung-hao (Chinese Taipei) Lu Chen-yu	(Hong Kong) Wong Tsz-fu (South Korea) Shin San-hui	(Netherlands) Fons van Sambeek (Thailand) Thanapet Chanta (United Kingdom) Oscar Brown (Chinese Taipei) Chen Kuan-shou
November 9	Kuala Lumpur, Malaysia; Hard; M15; Singles and doubles draws	(Italy) Edoardo Cherie Ligniere; 2–6, 7–5, 7–6^{(8–6)}	(India) Dev Javia	(United States) Azuma Visaya (Armenia) Daniil Sarksian	(Indonesia) Muhammad Rifqi Fitriadi (Malaysia) Koay Hao Sheng (Saudi Arabia) Ammar Alhogbani (Japan) Yuto Oki
November 9	Kuala Lumpur, Malaysia; Hard; M15; Singles and doubles draws	(Germany) David Eichenseher (Germany) Calvin Müller; 7–6^{(7–2)}, 6–3	(Japan) Yuto Oki (Japan) Yua Taka	(United States) Azuma Visaya (Armenia) Daniil Sarksian	(Indonesia) Muhammad Rifqi Fitriadi (Malaysia) Koay Hao Sheng (Saudi Arabia) Ammar Alhogbani (Japan) Yuto Oki
November 9	Las Palmas, Spain; Clay; M15; Singles and doubles draws	(Spain) Carles Córdoba; 4–6, 6–4, 4–1 ret.	(Venezuela) Ignacio Parisca	(Italy) Manuel Mazza (Poland) Marcel Zieliński	(Spain) Sergi Fita Juan (Spain) Roberto Pérez Socas (Spain) Alberto Barroso Campos (Spain) Matías Ponce de León Gomila
November 9	Las Palmas, Spain; Clay; M15; Singles and doubles draws	(Spain) David Naharro (Spain) Bruno Pujol Navarro; 6–3, 7–5	(Spain) Carles Rojas (Spain) David Vega Hernández	(Italy) Manuel Mazza (Poland) Marcel Zieliński	(Spain) Sergi Fita Juan (Spain) Roberto Pérez Socas (Spain) Alberto Barroso Campos (Spain) Matías Ponce de León Gomila
November 9	Heraklion, Greece; Hard; M15; Singles and doubles draws	(Croatia) Josip Šimundža; 6–1, 6–4	(Romania) Robert Guna	(Switzerland) Flynn Thomas (Spain) Imanol López Morillo	(France) Arthur Weber (United States) Miles Jones (Netherlands) Mac Visser (Germany) Michel Hopp
November 9	Heraklion, Greece; Hard; M15; Singles and doubles draws	(United States) Alex Jones (United States) Miles Jones; 7–5, 6–4	(Israel) Dan Brand (Switzerland) Flynn Thomas	(Switzerland) Flynn Thomas (Spain) Imanol López Morillo	(France) Arthur Weber (United States) Miles Jones (Netherlands) Mac Visser (Germany) Michel Hopp
November 9	Antalya, Türkiye; Clay; M15; Singles and doubles draws	(Poland) Alan Ważny; 6–0, 3–0 ret.	(Sweden) Dragoș Nicolae Mădăraș	(Romania) Ștefan Adrian Andreescu (Kazakhstan) Dmitry Popko	(France) Antoni Fabre (Iran) Ali Yazdani; Evgenii Tiurnev (Germany) Jannik Maute
November 9	Antalya, Türkiye; Clay; M15; Singles and doubles draws	(Czech Republic) Štěpán Baum (Czech Republic) Matyáš Černý; 6–4, 6–3	(Kazakhstan) Dmitry Popko; Evgenii Tiurnev	(Romania) Ștefan Adrian Andreescu (Kazakhstan) Dmitry Popko	(France) Antoni Fabre (Iran) Ali Yazdani; Evgenii Tiurnev (Germany) Jannik Maute
November 9	Sharm El Sheikh, Egypt; Hard; M15; Singles and doubles draws	Artur Kukasian; 6–4, 4–6, 7–5	(Ukraine) Yurii Dzhavakian	(Czech Republic) Marek Gengel (Italy) Filiberto Fumagalli	(Syria) Hazem Naw (Italy) Lorenzo Bocchi (Poland) Jan Wygona (Belgium) Pierre-Yves Bailly
November 9	Sharm El Sheikh, Egypt; Hard; M15; Singles and doubles draws	(Germany) Cedric Stanke (Luxembourg) Louis van Herck; 3–6, 6–3, [10–6]	(Turkey) Ramazan Kaan Oktay (Germany) Frederic Schlossmann	(Czech Republic) Marek Gengel (Italy) Filiberto Fumagalli	(Syria) Hazem Naw (Italy) Lorenzo Bocchi (Poland) Jan Wygona (Belgium) Pierre-Yves Bailly
November 9	Monastir, Tunisia; Hard; M15; Singles and doubles draws	(Tunisia) Wissam Abderrahman; 6–4, 6–3	(Germany) Julian Penzlin	(Uzbekistan) Nikita Belozertsev (Germany) Liam Gavrielides	(Turkey) Tuncay Duran (Italy) Andrea Colombo (France) Mathieu Scaglia (France) Amaury Raynel
November 9	Monastir, Tunisia; Hard; M15; Singles and doubles draws	(United States) Milledge Cossu (Venezuela) Luis David Martínez; 6–1, 6–3	(France) Yannis Batsabaken (Italy) Jacopo Denitto	(Uzbekistan) Nikita Belozertsev (Germany) Liam Gavrielides	(Turkey) Tuncay Duran (Italy) Andrea Colombo (France) Mathieu Scaglia (France) Amaury Raynel
November 9	Naples, United States; Clay; M15; Singles and doubles draws	(United States) Jack Secord; 5–7, 6–2, 6–3	(United States) Lucca Liu	(Romania) Dragoș Nicolae Cazacu (Czech Republic) Tomáš Jiroušek	(Algeria) Youcef Rihane (Brazil) Joaquim Almeida (United States) Evan Bynoe (United States) Justin Riley Anson
November 9	Naples, United States; Clay; M15; Singles and doubles draws	(United States) Max Sheldon (United States) Mitchell Sheldon; Walkover	(United States) Tristan McCormick (United States) Jesse Witten	(Romania) Dragoș Nicolae Cazacu (Czech Republic) Tomáš Jiroušek	(Algeria) Youcef Rihane (Brazil) Joaquim Almeida (United States) Evan Bynoe (United States) Justin Riley Anson
November 9	Zamora, Mexico; Clay; M15; Singles and doubles draws	(Mexico) Luis Carlos Álvarez Valdés; 6–2, 6–1	(Hong Kong) Kai Thompson	(Costa Rica) Jesse Flores (Argentina) Dante Carlos Teramo	(Chile) Matías Soto (United Kingdom) Blu Baker (Mexico) Rafael de Alba (Peru) Mauricio Echazú
November 9	Zamora, Mexico; Clay; M15; Singles and doubles draws	(Mexico) Luis Carlos Álvarez Valdés (Colombia) Andrés Urrea; 6–3, 6–1	(Mexico) Ian Luca Cervantes Tomás (Mexico) Oswaldo Alejandro Reyes Tirado	(Costa Rica) Jesse Flores (Argentina) Dante Carlos Teramo	(Chile) Matías Soto (United Kingdom) Blu Baker (Mexico) Rafael de Alba (Peru) Mauricio Echazú
November 9	Roldán, Argentina; Clay; M15; Singles and doubles draws	(Argentina) Juan Estévez; 7–5, 6–3	(Argentina) Rocco Valente	(Bolivia) Murkel Dellien (Argentina) Hernán Casanova	(Argentina) Tomas Martinez (Chile) Nicolás Bruna (Argentina) Dante Pagani (Argentina) Fermín Tenti
November 9	Roldán, Argentina; Clay; M15; Singles and doubles draws	(Argentina) Juan Estévez (Argentina) Gonzalo Zeitune; 6–7^{(5–7)}, 6–2, [10–6]	(Chile) Nicolás Bruna (Bolivia) Murkel Dellien	(Bolivia) Murkel Dellien (Argentina) Hernán Casanova	(Argentina) Tomas Martinez (Chile) Nicolás Bruna (Argentina) Dante Pagani (Argentina) Fermín Tenti
November 16	Bhubaneswar, India; Hard; M25; Singles and doubles draws	(Sweden) William Rejchtman Vinciguerra; 6–2, 3–6, 6–3	(India) Digvijaypratap Singh	(India) Manish Sureshkumar (India) Dev Javia	(India) Arjun Rathi (India) Hitesh Chauhan (India) Chirag Duhan (India) Mukund Sasikumar
November 16	Bhubaneswar, India; Hard; M25; Singles and doubles draws	(India) Chirag Duhan (India) Dev Javia; 6–3, 6–2	(India) Maan Kesharwani (India) Manish Sureshkumar	(India) Manish Sureshkumar (India) Dev Javia	(India) Arjun Rathi (India) Hitesh Chauhan (India) Chirag Duhan (India) Mukund Sasikumar
November 16	Vale do Lobo, Portugal; Hard; M25; Singles and doubles draws	(Switzerland) Patrick Schoen; 7–6^{(8–6)}, 6–2	(Austria) Sebastian Sorger	Pavel Lagutin (Spain) Pedro Ródenas	(Sweden) Olle Wallin (Portugal) Diogo Morais (Portugal) Francisco Rocha (Portugal) João Domingues
November 16	Vale do Lobo, Portugal; Hard; M25; Singles and doubles draws	(Portugal) Tiago Cação (Portugal) Diogo Marques; 6–4, 6–4	(Spain) Ignasi Forcano (Spain) Rafael Izquierdo Luque	Pavel Lagutin (Spain) Pedro Ródenas	(Sweden) Olle Wallin (Portugal) Diogo Morais (Portugal) Francisco Rocha (Portugal) João Domingues
November 16	Heraklion, Greece; Hard; M25; Singles and doubles draws	(United Kingdom) Henry Searle; 6–3, 6–7^{(2–7)}, 7–5	(Ukraine) Oleksii Krutykh	(Greece) Ioannis Xilas (Belgium) Gilles-Arnaud Bailly	(Ukraine) Nikita Mashtakov (France) Benjamin Pietri (Argentina) Julio César Porras (Cyprus) Melios Efstathiou
November 16	Heraklion, Greece; Hard; M25; Singles and doubles draws	(Ukraine) Georgii Kravchenko (Ukraine) Nikita Mashtakov; 6–3, 6–2	(Romania) Gabriel Ghețu (Romania) Rareș Teodor Pieleanu	(Greece) Ioannis Xilas (Belgium) Gilles-Arnaud Bailly	(Ukraine) Nikita Mashtakov (France) Benjamin Pietri (Argentina) Julio César Porras (Cyprus) Melios Efstathiou
November 16	Monastir, Tunisia; Hard; M25; Singles and doubles draws	(Croatia) Duje Ajduković; 6–1, 6–0	(Italy) Fausto Tabacco	(Serbia) Branko Đurić (Iran) Kasra Rahmani	(Italy) Filippo Romano (Italy) Federico Bondioli (France) Gabriel Debru (Italy) Federico Iannaccone
November 16	Monastir, Tunisia; Hard; M25; Singles and doubles draws	(Italy) Fausto Tabacco (Italy) Giorgio Tabacco; 7–6^{(8–6)}, 7–6^{(7–4)}	(Ghana) Isaac Nortey (Algeria) Toufik Sahtali	(Serbia) Branko Đurić (Iran) Kasra Rahmani	(Italy) Filippo Romano (Italy) Federico Bondioli (France) Gabriel Debru (Italy) Federico Iannaccone
November 16	Bradenton, United States; Hard; M25; Singles and doubles draws	(United States) Teodor Davidov vs (United Kingdom) Oliver Bonding		(United Kingdom) William Jansen (France) Romain Gales	(United States) Maximus Dussault (Italy) Lorenzo Claverie (United States) Marcel Latak (United States) Ilyas Milad Fahim
November 16	Bradenton, United States; Hard; M25; Singles and doubles draws	(Thailand) Tanapatt Nirundorn (United Kingdom) William Nolan; 3–6, 6–3, [13–11]	(Sweden) Mans Dahlberg (France) Jules Leroux	(United Kingdom) William Jansen (France) Romain Gales	(United States) Maximus Dussault (Italy) Lorenzo Claverie (United States) Marcel Latak (United States) Ilyas Milad Fahim
November 16	Chihuahua, Mexico; Clay; M25; Singles and doubles draws	(Mexico) Alan Magadán vs (Mexico) Luis Carlos Álvarez Valdés		(Italy) Matteo Covato (Mexico) Rodrigo Alujas	(Puerto Rico) Yannik Álvarez (Ecuador) Patricio Alvarado (United Kingdom) Blu Baker (United States) Lucca Liu
November 16	Chihuahua, Mexico; Clay; M25; Singles and doubles draws	(Puerto Rico) Yannik Álvarez (United States) Ryan Cozad; 7–6^{(7–1)}, 7–5	(Mexico) Emiliano Aguilera Guerrero (United States) Alexander Bernard	(Italy) Matteo Covato (Mexico) Rodrigo Alujas	(Puerto Rico) Yannik Álvarez (Ecuador) Patricio Alvarado (United Kingdom) Blu Baker (United States) Lucca Liu
November 16	Lajeado, Brazil; Clay; M25; Singles and doubles draws	(Argentina) Juan Bautista Torres; 6–3, 6–1	(Argentina) Lorenzo Joaquín Rodríguez	(Spain) Javier Barranco Cosano (Brazil) Mateus Alves	(Brazil) Daniel Dutra da Silva (Brazil) Pedro Sakamoto (Argentina) Santiago Rodríguez Taverna (Argentina) Carlos María Zárate
November 16	Lajeado, Brazil; Clay; M25; Singles and doubles draws	(Argentina) Lorenzo Joaquín Rodríguez (Brazil) Pedro Sakamoto; Walkover	(Brazil) Rafael Tosetto (Brazil) Nicolas Zanellato	(Spain) Javier Barranco Cosano (Brazil) Mateus Alves	(Brazil) Daniel Dutra da Silva (Brazil) Pedro Sakamoto (Argentina) Santiago Rodríguez Taverna (Argentina) Carlos María Zárate
November 16	Hua Hin, Thailand; Hard; M15; Singles and doubles draws	(Turkey) Ergi Kırkın; 6–2, 6–1	(Italy) Manuel Plunger	(Thailand) Markus Malaszszak (South Korea) Shin San-hui	(Kazakhstan) Denis Yevseyev (Thailand) Thanapet Chanta (Chinese Taipei) Chen Kuan-shou (Thailand) Pawit Sornlaksup
November 16	Hua Hin, Thailand; Hard; M15; Singles and doubles draws	(Australia) Stefan Storch (Thailand) James van Herzeele; 6–1, 7–5	(United Kingdom) Max Benaim (Thailand) Congsup Congcar	(Thailand) Markus Malaszszak (South Korea) Shin San-hui	(Kazakhstan) Denis Yevseyev (Thailand) Thanapet Chanta (Chinese Taipei) Chen Kuan-shou (Thailand) Pawit Sornlaksup
November 16	Kuala Lumpur, Malaysia; Hard; M15; Singles and doubles draws	(Italy) Edoardo Cherie Ligniere; 6–2, 4–6, 6–1	(Japan) Yuto Oki	(Armenia) Daniil Sarksian (Germany) Calvin Müller	(Japan) Noritaka Koizumi (Malaysia) Darrshan Suresh (Indonesia) Gunawan Trismuwantara (Singapore) Shaheed Alam
November 16	Kuala Lumpur, Malaysia; Hard; M15; Singles and doubles draws	(United States) Jayson Blando (United States) Michael Blando; 6–3, 6–1	(South Korea) Ann Suk (South Korea) Kim Geun-jun	(Armenia) Daniil Sarksian (Germany) Calvin Müller	(Japan) Noritaka Koizumi (Malaysia) Darrshan Suresh (Indonesia) Gunawan Trismuwantara (Singapore) Shaheed Alam
November 16	Alcalá de Henares, Spain; Hard; M15; Singles and doubles draws	(Spain) Bernardo Munk Mesa; 6–7^{(3–7)}, 6–1, 7–6^{(7–5)}	(Spain) Pablo Pérez Ramos	(Spain) Carles Hernández (Spain) Alejandro García Carbajal	(France) Matt Ponchet (Spain) Jorge Plans (Spain) Enrique Carrascosa Díaz (Netherlands) Jip van Assendelft
November 16	Alcalá de Henares, Spain; Hard; M15; Singles and doubles draws	(France) Adan Freire da Silva (France) Matt Ponchet; Walkover	(Spain) Alejandro García Carbajal (Spain) Sergio Planella Hernández	(Spain) Carles Hernández (Spain) Alejandro García Carbajal	(France) Matt Ponchet (Spain) Jorge Plans (Spain) Enrique Carrascosa Díaz (Netherlands) Jip van Assendelft
November 16	Antalya, Türkiye; Clay; M15; Singles and doubles draws	(Kazakhstan) Dmitry Popko; 6–2, 7–5	Andrey Chepelev	(Austria) Thilo Behrmann (Iran) Ali Yazdani	(Italy) Alessandro Bellifemine (Italy) Andrea Paolini (Czech Republic) Matyáš Černý (Sweden) Dragoș Nicolae Mădăraș
November 16	Antalya, Türkiye; Clay; M15; Singles and doubles draws	(Czech Republic) Štěpán Baum (Czech Republic) Matyáš Černý; 6–2, 6–2	(Switzerland) Noah Lopez (Austria) Matthias Ujvary	(Austria) Thilo Behrmann (Iran) Ali Yazdani	(Italy) Alessandro Bellifemine (Italy) Andrea Paolini (Czech Republic) Matyáš Černý (Sweden) Dragoș Nicolae Mădăraș
November 16	Sharm El Sheikh, Egypt; Hard; M15; Singles and doubles draws	Artur Kukasian; 6–4, 7–6^{(7–5)}	Anton Arzhankin	(Czech Republic) Marek Gengel (Syria) Hazem Naw	(Georgia (country)) Aleksandre Bakshi (Netherlands) Stijn Paardekooper (Georgia (country)) Saba Purtseladze (Egypt) Karim Ibrahim
November 16	Sharm El Sheikh, Egypt; Hard; M15; Singles and doubles draws	(Syria) Hazem Naw (Germany) Frederic Schlossmann; 7–6^{(7–3)}, 7–6^{(7–3)}	(Georgia (country)) Aleksandre Bakshi (Georgia (country)) Saba Purtseladze	(Czech Republic) Marek Gengel (Syria) Hazem Naw	(Georgia (country)) Aleksandre Bakshi (Netherlands) Stijn Paardekooper (Georgia (country)) Saba Purtseladze (Egypt) Karim Ibrahim
November 16	Monastir, Tunisia; Hard; M15; Singles and doubles draws	(Italy) Giulio Perego; 7–5, 3–6, 7–6^{(7–5)}	(Tunisia) Aziz Ouakaa	(South Africa) Kris van Wyk (Italy) Andrea Colombo	(Germany) Liam Gavrielides (France) Mathieu Scaglia (Uzbekistan) Nikita Belozertsev (Germany) Vincent Reisach
November 16	Monastir, Tunisia; Hard; M15; Singles and doubles draws	(Italy) Andrea Colombo (Italy) Giulio Perego; 6–3, 6–2	(Republic of Ireland) Ammar Elamin (South Africa) Kris van Wyk	(South Africa) Kris van Wyk (Italy) Andrea Colombo	(Germany) Liam Gavrielides (France) Mathieu Scaglia (Uzbekistan) Nikita Belozertsev (Germany) Vincent Reisach
November 16	Orlando, United States; Clay; M15; Singles and doubles draws	(United States) vs (United States) Justin Riley Anson		(United States) William Manning vs (United States) Felix Corwin (France) Clément Lemire	(Australia) Ty Host (Brazil) Enzo Kohlmann de Freitas (United States) Roman Sancilio (United States) Anuj Watane
November 16	Orlando, United States; Clay; M15; Singles and doubles draws	Doubles competition was cancelled due to poor weather		(United States) William Manning vs (United States) Felix Corwin (France) Clément Lemire	(Australia) Ty Host (Brazil) Enzo Kohlmann de Freitas (United States) Roman Sancilio (United States) Anuj Watane
November 16	Santa Cruz, Bolivia; Clay; M15; Singles and doubles draws	(Bolivia) Agustín Eduardo Cuéllar Lorberg vs (Argentina) Felipe de Dios		(Portugal) Pedro Liborio (Argentina) Francisco Gay	(Bolivia) Murkel Dellien (Brazil) Victor Pagotto (United Kingdom) Henry Best (Brazil) João Vítor Scramin do Lago
November 16	Santa Cruz, Bolivia; Clay; M15; Singles and doubles draws	(Brazil) Victor Braga (Netherlands) Michiel de Krom; 7–5, 6–1	(Bolivia) Agustín Eduardo Cuéllar Lorberg (Bolivia) Leonardo Suarez	(Portugal) Pedro Liborio (Argentina) Francisco Gay	(Bolivia) Murkel Dellien (Brazil) Victor Pagotto (United Kingdom) Henry Best (Brazil) João Vítor Scramin do Lago
November 16	Olavarria, Argentina; Clay; M15; Singles and doubles draws	(Argentina) Juan Estévez; 6–2, 4–6, 6–2	(Argentina) Lorenzo Gagliardo	(Argentina) Mateo del Pino (Argentina) Ivan Dreycopp	(Chile) Nicolás Bruna (Argentina) Tomas Re (Argentina) Dante Pagani (Argentina) Fermín Tenti
November 16	Olavarria, Argentina; Clay; M15; Singles and doubles draws	(Argentina) Giovanni Branchetti (Argentina) Valentino Grippo; 6–2, 6–3	(Argentina) Juan Ignacio Gallego (Argentina) Tadeo Meneo	(Argentina) Mateo del Pino (Argentina) Ivan Dreycopp	(Chile) Nicolás Bruna (Argentina) Tomas Re (Argentina) Dante Pagani (Argentina) Fermín Tenti
November 23	Bhopal, India; Hard; M25; Singles and doubles draws	vs		vs vs	vs vs vs vs
November 23	Bhopal, India; Hard; M25; Singles and doubles draws	/ vs /		vs vs	vs vs vs vs
November 23	Hradec Králové, Czech Republic; Hard (i); M25; Singles and doubles draws	vs		vs vs	vs vs vs vs
November 23	Hradec Králové, Czech Republic; Hard (i); M25; Singles and doubles draws	/ vs /		vs vs	vs vs vs vs
November 23	Madrid, Spain; Hard; M15; Singles and doubles draws	vs		vs vs	vs vs vs vs
November 23	Madrid, Spain; Hard; M15; Singles and doubles draws	/ vs /		vs vs	vs vs vs vs
November 23	Heraklion, Greece; Hard; M15; Singles and doubles draws	vs		vs vs	vs vs vs vs
November 23	Heraklion, Greece; Hard; M15; Singles and doubles draws	/ vs /		vs vs	vs vs vs vs
November 23	Antalya, Türkiye; Clay; M15; Singles and doubles draws	vs		vs vs	vs vs vs vs
November 23	Antalya, Türkiye; Clay; M15; Singles and doubles draws	/ vs /		vs vs	vs vs vs vs
November 23	Sharm El Sheikh, Egypt; Hard; M15; Singles and doubles draws	vs		vs vs	vs vs vs vs
November 23	Sharm El Sheikh, Egypt; Hard; M15; Singles and doubles draws	/ vs /		vs vs	vs vs vs vs
November 23	Monastir, Tunisia; Hard; M15; Singles and doubles draws	vs		vs vs	vs vs vs vs
November 23	Monastir, Tunisia; Hard; M15; Singles and doubles draws	/ vs /		vs vs	vs vs vs vs
November 23	Santa Cruz, Bolivia; Clay; M15; Singles and doubles draws	vs		vs vs	vs vs vs vs
November 23	Santa Cruz, Bolivia; Clay; M15; Singles and doubles draws	/ vs /		vs vs	vs vs vs vs
