= Erik Grevelius =

Swedish tennis player

- Country (sports): Sweden
- Born: 24 June 2000 (age 26) Lidingö, Sweden
- Height: 1.83 m (6 ft 0 in)
- Plays: Right-handed (two-handed backhand)
- College: Georgia; South Florida
- Coach: Zack Ohlin, Magnus Ennerberg
- Prize money: US $80,161

Singles
- Career record: 0–0 (at ATP Tour level, Grand Slam level, and in Davis Cup)
- Career titles: 0
- Highest ranking: No. 1,495 (12 June 2023)

Doubles
- Career record: 6–5 (at ATP Tour level, Grand Slam level, and in Davis Cup)
- Career titles: 1; 5 Challenger, 10 ITF
- Highest ranking: No. 93 (16 November 2026)
- Current ranking: No. 93 (16 November 2026)
- Last updated on: 16 November 2026.

Erik Grevelius (born 24 June 2000) is a Swedish tennis player. He has a career high ATP singles ranking of No. 1,495 achieved on 12 June 2023 and a career high ATP doubles ranking of No. 93 achieved on 16 November 2026.

Grevelius played college tennis at Georgia before transferring to South Florida.

== Career ==
Grevelius made his ATP main draw debut at the 2024 Stockholm Open after receiving a wildcard into the doubles main draw with Filip Bergevi.

Grevelius and Adam Heinonen won their maiden doubles title at the 2026 Stockholm Open, defeating Nikola Mektić and Édouard Roger-Vasselin in the final, 6–3, 6–4. They became the first all-Swedish duo to win the Stockholm title since brothers Elias Ymer and Mikael Ymer triumphed in 2016.

== ATP Tour Finals ==
=== Doubles: 1 (title) ===
Legend ATP 250 (1–0)	Finals by surface Hard (1–0)	Finals by setting Indoor (1–0)

Result	W–L	Date	Tournament	Tier	Surface	Partner	Opponents	Score
Win	1–0	Nov 2026	Stockholm Open, Sweden	ATP 250	Hard (i)	(Sweden) Adam Heinonen	(Croatia) Nikola Mektić (France) Édouard Roger-Vasselin	6–3, 6–4

== ATP Challenger Tour finals ==
=== Doubles: 8 (5–3) ===
Legend ATP Challenger Tour (5–3)	Titles by surface Hard (1–1) Clay (4–2) Grass (0–0) Carpet (0–0)

Result	W–L	Date	Tournament	Tier	Surface	Partner	Opponents	Score
Win	1–0	Apr 2025	Rome, Italy	Challenger	Clay	(Sweden) Adam Heinonen	(Italy) Marco Bortolotti (Italy) Giorgio Ricca	7–6^{(7–2)}, 7–5
Win	2–0	Nov 2025	Alicante, Spain	Challenger	Clay	(Sweden) Adam Heinonen	(Italy) Federico Bondioli (Italy) Gianluca Cadenasso	6–3, 6–3
Win	3–0	Jan 2026	Soma Bay, Egypt	Challenger	Hard	(Sweden) Adam Heinonen	(Mexico) Alex Hernández (Mexico) Rodrigo Pacheco Méndez	6–2, 6–3
Loss	3–1	Jan 2026	Oeiras, Portugal	Challenger	Hard	(Sweden) Adam Heinonen	(Czech Republic) Filip Duda (Czech Republic) Zdeněk Kolář	3–6, 4–6
Win	4–1	May 2026	Vicenza, Italy	Challenger	Clay	(Sweden) Adam Heinonen	(Switzerland) Rémy Bertola (Italy) Francesco Forti	7–6^{(7–1)}, 7–6^{(7–5)}
Loss	4–2	June 2026	Cattolica, Italy	Challenger	Clay	(Sweden) Adam Heinonen	(Romania) Alexandru Jecan (Romania) Bogdan Pavel	6–7^{(10–12)}, 4–6
Win	5–2	July 2026	Iași, Romania	Challenger	Clay	(Sweden) Adam Heinonen	(Serbia) Ivan Sabanov (Serbia) Matej Sabanov	6–4, 6–2
Loss	5–3	Aug 2026	Prague, Czech Republic	Challenger	Clay	(Sweden) Adam Heinonen	(Belgium) Joran Vliegen (Czech Republic) Andrew Paulson	4–6, 3–6
