= 2026 Stockholm Open =

Men's tennis tournament

- Date: 8–14 November
- Edition: 57th
- Category: ATP 250
- Draw: 28S / 16D
- Surface: Hard (indoor)
- Location: Stockholm, Sweden
- Venue: Kungliga tennishallen

Champions

Singles
- (United States) Taylor Fritz

Doubles
- (Sweden) Erik Grevelius / (Sweden) Adam Heinonen
- Stockholm Open

The 2026 Bybit Stockholm Open was a professional men's tennis tournament played on indoor hard courts. It was the 57th edition of the tournament, and an ATP 250 event on the 2026 ATP Tour. It took place at the Kungliga tennishallen in Stockholm, Sweden from 8 to 14 November 2026.

== Champions ==
=== Singles ===
- (United States) Taylor Fritz def. (Argentina) Thiago Agustín Tirante, 6–2, 4–6, 7–6^{(7–3)}

=== Doubles ===
- (Sweden) Erik Grevelius / (Sweden) Adam Heinonen def. (Croatia) Nikola Mektić / (France) Édouard Roger-Vasselin, 6–3, 6–4

== Singles main-draw entrants ==
=== Seeds ===
Country	Player	Rank^{1}	Seed
USA	Taylor Fritz	12	1
NOR	Casper Ruud	23	2
ITA	Lorenzo Musetti	24	3
CHI	Alejandro Tabilo	30	4
ARG	Tomás Martín Etcheverry	31	5
USA	Alex Michelsen	35	6
NED	Botic van de Zandschulp	37	7
FRA	Ugo Humbert	38	8

- Rankings are as of 2 November 2026.

=== Other entrants ===
The following players received wildcards into the singles main draw:

- (Sweden) Leo Borg
- (Sweden) Max Dahlin
- (Sweden) Elias Ymer

The following player received entry using a protected ranking:

- (Denmark) Holger Rune

The following player received a entry as a late entry:

- (Italy) Lorenzo Musetti

The following players received entry from the qualifying draw:

- (Croatia) Borna Gojo
- (United Kingdom) Toby Samuel
- (Kazakhstan) Alexander Shevchenko
- (Italy) Lorenzo Sonego

The following player received entry as a lucky loser:

- (France) Adrian Mannarino

=== Withdrawals ===
- (Belgium) Alexander Blockx → replaced by (Czech Republic) Tomáš Macháč
- (Kazakhstan) Alexander Bublik → replaced by (Argentina) Juan Manuel Cerúndolo
- (Argentina) Francisco Cerúndolo → replaced by (Australia) James Duckworth
- (Italy) Luciano Darderi → replaced by (France) Quentin Halys
- (Spain) Alejandro Davidovich Fokina → replaced by (Spain) Jaume Munar
- (United Kingdom) Arthur Fery → replaced by (Paraguay) Adolfo Daniel Vallejo
- (Canada) Denis Shapovalov → replaced by (Argentina) Thiago Agustín Tirante
- (Monaco) Valentin Vacherot → replaced by (France) Adrian Mannarino

== Doubles main-draw entrants ==
=== Seeds ===
Country	Player	Country	Player	Rank^{1}	Seed
CRO	Nikola Mektić	FRA	Édouard Roger-Vasselin	55	1
AUS	Marc Polmans	POL	Jan Zieliński	61	2
GER	Jakob Schnaitter	GER	Mark Wallner	62	3
FRA	Sadio Doumbia	NED	David Pel	71	4

- Rankings are as of 2 November 2026

=== Other entrants ===
The following pairs received wildcards into the doubles main draw:

- (Sweden) Erik Grevelius / (Sweden) Adam Heinonen
- (Sweden) William Rejchtman Vinciguerra / (Sweden) Olle Wallin
