= 2026 Stockholm Open – Doubles =

Doubles
- 2026 Stockholm Open

Final
- Champions: (Sweden) Erik Grevelius (Sweden) Adam Heinonen
- Runners-up: (Croatia) Nikola Mektić (France) Édouard Roger-Vasselin
- Score: 6–3, 6–4

Events
Singles	Doubles
- Stockholm Open

Erik Grevelius and Adam Heinonen defeated Nikola Mektić and Édouard Roger-Vasselin in the final, 6–3, 6–4 to win the doubles tennis title at the 2026 Stockholm Open. It was the first ATP Tour title for both players. They became the first all-Swedish team to win the Stockholm title since brothers Elias and Mikael Ymer triumphed in 2016.

Alexander Erler and Robert Galloway were the reigning champions, but did not compete together this year. Erler partnered Robert Cash, but lost in the first round to Mektić and Roger-Vasselin. Galloway partnered André Göransson, but lost in quarterfinals to Constantin Frantzen and Bart Stevens.

== Seeds ==
1. (Croatia) Nikola Mektić / (France) Édouard Roger-Vasselin (final)
2. (Australia) Marc Polmans / (Poland) Jan Zieliński (first round)
3. (Germany) Jakob Schnaitter / (Germany) Mark Wallner (first round)
4. (France) Sadio Doumbia / (Netherlands) David Pel (first round)

== Draw ==
Key

- Q = Qualifier
- WC = Wild card
- LL = Lucky loser
- Alt = Alternate
- ITF = ITF entry
- PR = Protected ranking
- SR = Special ranking
- SE = Special exempt
- JE = Junior exempt
- JR = Junior Accelerator Programme entrant
- CO = College Accelerator Programme entrant
- NG = Next Gen Accelerator Program entrant
- w/o = Walkover
- r = Retired
- d = Defaulted

=== Draw ===
First round
1	(Croatia) N Mektić (France) É Roger-Vasselin	6	6
(United States) R Cash (Austria) A Erler	2	1
(Netherlands) J-J Rojer (United States) T Winegar	7^{7}	6
WC	(Sweden) W Rejchtman Vinciguerra (Sweden) O Wallin	6^{2}	3
3	(Germany) J Schnaitter (Germany) M Wallner	4	3
(Czech Republic) A Pavlásek (Czech Republic) P Rikl	6	6
(India) S Balaji (United States) E King	6	3	[8]
(Netherlands) S Arends (United Kingdom) L Johnson	3	6	[10]
(Serbia) M Kecmanović (Brazil) M Melo	6^{3}	6^{8}
(Germany) H Jebens (United States) R Seggerman	7^{7}	7^{10}
WC	(Sweden) E Grevelius (Sweden) A Heinonen	7^{7}	2	[10]
4	(France) S Doumbia (Netherlands) D Pel	6^{1}	6	[4]
(Germany) C Frantzen (Netherlands) B Stevens	7	7^{7}
PR	(Czech Republic) P Nouza (New Zealand) M Venus	5	6^{4}
(United States) R Galloway (Sweden) A Göransson	6	6
2	(Australia) M Polmans (Poland) J Zieliński	3	4

Quarterfinals
1	(Croatia) N Mektić (France) É Roger-Vasselin	6	6
(Netherlands) J-J Rojer (United States) T Winegar	2	2
(Czech Republic) A Pavlásek (Czech Republic) P Rikl	7^{8}	6
(Netherlands) S Arends (United Kingdom) L Johnson	6^{6}	3
(Germany) H Jebens (United States) R Seggerman	4	7^{12}	[6]
WC	(Sweden) E Grevelius (Sweden) A Heinonen	6	6^{10}	[10]
(Germany) C Frantzen (Netherlands) B Stevens	6	7^{7}
(United States) R Galloway (Sweden) A Göransson	4	6^{2}

Semifinals
1	(Croatia) N Mektić (France) É Roger-Vasselin	w/o
(Czech Republic) A Pavlásek (Czech Republic) P Rikl
WC	(Sweden) E Grevelius (Sweden) A Heinonen	6	6
(Germany) C Frantzen (Netherlands) B Stevens	4	2

Final
1	(Croatia) N Mektić (France) É Roger-Vasselin	3	4
WC	(Sweden) E Grevelius (Sweden) A Heinonen	6	6
