= Adam Heinonen =

Swedish tennis player

- Country (sports): Sweden
- Born: 22 August 2002 (age 24) Växjö, Sweden
- Height: 1.88 m (6 ft 2 in)
- Plays: Right-handed (one-handed backhand)
- Coach: Petar Bubalo
- Prize money: US $92,718

Singles
- Career record: 0–0 (at ATP Tour level, Grand Slam level, and in Davis Cup)
- Career titles: 0
- Highest ranking: No. 735 (17 February 2025)

Doubles
- Career record: 4–4 (at ATP Tour level, Grand Slam level, and in Davis Cup)
- Career titles: 1; 10 ITF
- Highest ranking: No. 85 (16 November 2026)
- Current ranking: No. 85 (16 November 2026)
- Last updated on: 16 November 2026.

Adam Heinonen (born 22 August 2002) is a Swedish tennis player. Heinonen has a career high ATP singles ranking of No. 735 achieved on 17 February 2025 and a career high ATP doubles ranking of No. 85 achieved on 16 November 2026.

Heinonen represents Sweden at the Davis Cup.

== Career ==
Heinonen made his ATP Tour main draw debut at the 2024 Stockholm Open after receiving a wildcard into the doubles main draw with Leo Borg.

Heinonen and Erik Grevelius won their maiden doubles title at the 2026 Stockholm Open, defeating Nikola Mektić and Édouard Roger-Vasselin in the final, 6–3, 6–4. They became the first all-Swedish duo to win the Stockholm title since brothers Elias Ymer and Mikael Ymer triumphed in 2016.

== ATP Tour Finals ==
=== Doubles: 1 (title) ===
Legend ATP 250 (1–0)	Finals by surface Hard (1–0)	Finals by setting Indoor (1–0)

Result	W–L	Date	Tournament	Tier	Surface	Partner	Opponents	Score
Win	1–0	Nov 2026	Stockholm Open, Sweden	ATP 250	Hard (i)	(Sweden) Erik Grevelius	(Croatia) Nikola Mektić (France) Édouard Roger-Vasselin	6–3, 6–4
