= 2026 Uruguay Open – Doubles =

Doubles
- 2026 Uruguay Open

Final
- Champions: (Colombia) Nicolás Barrientos (Argentina) Mariano Kestelboim
- Runners-up: (Poland) Karol Drzewiecki (Poland) Piotr Matuszewski
- Score: 6–3, 6–2

Events
Singles	Doubles
- Uruguay Open

Facundo Mena and Rodrigo Pacheco Méndez were the defending champions but chose not to defend their title.

Nicolás Barrientos and Mariano Kestelboim won the title after defeating Karol Drzewiecki and Piotr Matuszewski 6–3, 6–2 in the final.

== Seeds ==
1. (Colombia) Nicolás Barrientos / (Argentina) Mariano Kestelboim (champions)
2. (Poland) Karol Drzewiecki / (Poland) Piotr Matuszewski (final)
3. (Bolivia) Boris Arias / (Uruguay) Ignacio Carou (semifinals)
4. (Peru) Arklon Huertas del Pino / (Bolivia) Federico Zeballos (quarterfinals)

== Draw ==
Key

- Q = Qualifier
- WC = Wild card
- LL = Lucky loser
- Alt = Alternate
- ITF = ITF entry
- PR = Protected ranking
- SR = Special ranking
- SE = Special exempt
- JE = Junior exempt
- JR = Junior Accelerator Programme entrant
- CO = College Accelerator Programme entrant
- NG = Next Gen Accelerator Program entrant
- w/o = Walkover
- r = Retired
- d = Defaulted

First round
WC	(Argentina) S de la Fuente (Uruguay) F Llanes	6	2	[7]
(Brazil) Bruno Oliveira (Brazil) Natan Rodrigues	2	6	[10]
3	(Bolivia) B Arias (Uruguay) I Carou	6	6
(Argentina) Nicolás Hollender (Argentina) GA Olivieri	0	4
(Brazil) P Boscardin Dias (Brazil) Bruno Fernandez	6	5	[10]
WC	(Uruguay) Federico Aguilar Cardozo (Argentina) JM La Serna	4	7	[8]
(Netherlands) Ryan Nijboer (Switzerland) J Nikles	6	6
(Spain) M Alcalá Gurri (Spain) O Roca Batalla	2	4
(Peru) A Merino (Argentina) F Ribero	6^{1}	4
4	(Peru) A Huertas del Pino (Bolivia) F Zeballos	7^{7}	6

Quarterfinals
1	(Colombia) N Barrientos (Argentina) M Kestelboim	6	6
(Brazil) B Oliveira (Brazil) N Rodrigues	2	0
3	(Bolivia) B Arias (Uruguay) I Carou	6	1	[10]
(Brazil) P Boscardin Dias (Brazil) B Fernandez	2	6	[8]
(Netherlands) R Nijboer (Switzerland) J Nikles	7^{7}	6
4	(Peru) A Huertas del Pino (Bolivia) F Zeballos	6^{3}	4
(Ecuador) Á Guillén Meza (Argentina) G Villanueva
2	(Poland) K Drzewiecki (Poland) P Matuszewski	w/o

Semifinals
1	(Colombia) N Barrientos (Argentina) M Kestelboim	6	6
3	(Bolivia) B Arias (Uruguay) I Carou	4	2
(Netherlands) R Nijboer (Switzerland) J Nikles	3	4
2	(Poland) K Drzewiecki (Poland) P Matuszewski	6	6

Final
1	(Colombia) N Barrientos (Argentina) M Kestelboim	6	6
2	(Poland) K Drzewiecki (Poland) P Matuszewski	3	2
