= 2026 Kobe Challenger – Doubles =

Doubles
- 2026 Kobe Challenger

Final
- Champions: (New Zealand) Finn Reynolds (New Zealand) James Watt
- Runners-up: (Netherlands) Thijmen Loof (Japan) Kaito Uesugi
- Score: 4–6, 7–6^{(7–5)}, [10–6]

Events
Singles	Doubles
- Kobe Challenger

Neil Oberleitner and Michael Vrbenský were the defending champions but chose not to defend their title.

Finn Reynolds and James Watt won the title after defeating Thijmen Loof and Kaito Uesugi 4–6, 7–6^{(7–5)}, [10–6] in the final.

== Seeds ==
1. (New Zealand) Finn Reynolds / (New Zealand) James Watt (champions)
2. (Chinese Taipei) Ray Ho / (Thailand) Pruchya Isaro (quarterfinals)
3. (Netherlands) Thijmen Loof / (Japan) Kaito Uesugi (final)
4. (India) Siddhant Banthia / (India) Anirudh Chandrasekar (semifinals)

== Draw ==
Key

- Q = Qualifier
- WC = Wild card
- LL = Lucky loser
- Alt = Alternate
- ITF = ITF entry
- PR = Protected ranking
- SR = Special ranking
- SE = Special exempt
- JE = Junior exempt
- JR = Junior Accelerator Programme entrant
- CO = College Accelerator Programme entrant
- NG = Next Gen Accelerator Program entrant
- w/o = Walkover
- r = Retired
- d = Defaulted

First round
1	(New Zealand) F Reynolds (New Zealand) J Watt	6	3	[10]
Alt	(Japan) Y Kusuhara (Japan) S Nakagawa	1	6	[7]
(India) A Kadhe (China) A Wang	6	3	[13]
WC	(Japan) T Ichikawa (Japan) Y Shimizu	4	6	[15]
4	(India) S Banthia (India) A Chandrasekar	6	7
(Japan) M Imamura (Japan) R Noguchi	1	5
(United Kingdom) F Bass (United Kingdom) S Duncan	7^{7}	6
PR	(Japan) T Matsui (India) R Ramanathan	6^{3}	3
WC	(Japan) Ryuki Matsuda (Japan) Yuta Tomida	2	6	[8]
(India) SDP Dev (India) Nitin Kumar Sinha	6	4	[10]
(Romania) A Jecan (Poland) S Kielan	1	3
3	(Netherlands) T Loof (Japan) K Uesugi	6	6
(Chinese Taipei) C-p Hsieh (United States) K Smith	7^{8}	6
(France) C Bittoun Kouzmine (Czech Republic) D Poljak	6^{6}	1
(Chinese Taipei) Y-h Hsu (China) F Sun	6^{5}	6	[6]
2	(Chinese Taipei) R Ho (Thailand) P Isaro	7^{7}	4	[10]

Quarterfinals
1	(New Zealand) F Reynolds (New Zealand) J Watt	7^{7}	6
WC	(Japan) T Ichikawa (Japan) Y Shimizu	6^{2}	2
4	(India) S Banthia (India) A Chandrasekar	7^{7}	6
(United Kingdom) F Bass (United Kingdom) S Duncan	6^{5}	4
(India) SDP Dev (India) NK Sinha	2	2
3	(Netherlands) T Loof (Japan) K Uesugi	6	6
(Chinese Taipei) C-p Hsieh (United States) K Smith	7^{7}	6
2	(Chinese Taipei) R Ho (Thailand) P Isaro	6^{3}	3

Semifinals
1	(New Zealand) F Reynolds (New Zealand) J Watt	6^{5}	7	[10]
4	(India) S Banthia (India) A Chandrasekar	7^{7}	5	[7]
3	(Netherlands) T Loof (Japan) K Uesugi	7	7
(Chinese Taipei) C-p Hsieh (United States) K Smith	5	5

Final
1	(New Zealand) F Reynolds (New Zealand) J Watt	4	7^{7}	[10]
3	(Netherlands) T Loof (Japan) K Uesugi	6	6^{5}	[6]
