= 2026 El Salvador Open – Singles =

Singles
- 2026 El Salvador Open

Events
| Singles | Doubles |
- El Salvador Open

This is the first edition of the tournament.

== Seeds ==
1. (France) Timo Legout
2. (Argentina) Luciano Emanuel Ambrogi
3. (Jamaica) Blaise Bicknell
4. (Brazil) Mateus Alves
5. (Israel) Amit Vales
6. (Brazil) Guto Miguel
7. (Brazil) Lucas Andrade da Silva
8. (Colombia) Juan Sebastián Gómez

== Draw ==
Key

- Q = Qualifier
- WC = Wild card
- LL = Lucky loser
- Alt = Alternate
- ITF = ITF entry
- PR = Protected ranking
- SR = Special ranking
- SE = Special exempt
- JE = Junior exempt
- JR = Junior Accelerator Programme entrant
- CO = College Accelerator Programme entrant
- NG = Next Gen Accelerator Program entrant
- w/o = Walkover
- r = Retired
- d = Defaulted

=== Finals ===
Semifinals

Final

=== Top half ===
First round
1 | (France) T Legout
(Italy) Lorenzo Claverie
Q
Q
(Colombia) Samuel Heredia
(France) YT Alexandrescou
Q
5 | (Israel) Amit Vales
3 | (Jamaica) B Bicknell
Alt | (Argentina) Segundo Goity Zapico
(Barbados) D King
(United States) Theodore Dean
(Colombia) Juan Sebastián Osorio
(United Kingdom) Oliver Bonding
(Italy) Matteo Covato
6/WC | (Brazil) G Miguel

Second round
Q

Quarterfinals

Semifinals

=== Bottom half ===
First round
8 | (Colombia) JS Gómez
(Canada) Benjamin Thomas George
Alt | (Ecuador) P Alvarado
(Mexico) LC Álvarez
Q
(Mexico) AF Rubio Fierros
(United States) Benjamin Willwerth
4 | (Brazil) M Alves
7 | (Brazil) Lucas Andrade da Silva
Q
WC | (El Salvador) Diego Durán
(Costa Rica) J Flores
WC | (El Salvador) César Cruz
(Nicaragua) Joaquín Guilleme
Q
2 | (Argentina) LE Ambrogi

Second round

Quarterfinals

Semifinals
