= El Salvador Open =

Men's professional tennis tournament in El Salvador

ATP Challenger Tour
- Event name: El Salvador Open presentado por DIANA
- Tour: ATP Challenger Tour
- Founded: 2026; 0 years ago
- Editions: 1 (2026)
- Location: San Salvador, El Salvador
- Venue: Polideportivo Ciudad Merliot
- Category: Challenger 50
- Surface: Hard
- Draw: 32S / 24Q / 16D
- Prize money: $63,000 (2026)

Current champions (2026)
- Singles: TBD
- Doubles: TBD

The El Salvador Open (presented by Diana for sponsorship reasons) is an annual professional men's tennis tournament held in the San Salvador metropolitan area, El Salvador. The tournament is played on outdoor hardcourts at the Polideportivo Ciudad Merliot in Ciudad Merliot, Santa Tecla, and is held in late November. It is an ATP Challenger event on the ATP Challenger Tour.

== History ==
In September 2026, following a decade of negotiations between the Salvadoran Tennis Federation (FST) and the Association of Tennis Professionals (ATP), El Salvador was officially awarded a spot on the 2026 ATP Challenger Tour calendar. The tournament was formally launched on 30 October 2026, by the National Institute of Sports of El Salvador (INDES) and the title sponsor, Productos Alimenticios Diana.

The inaugural edition became the first ATP Challenger Tour tournament ever held in El Salvador and the first in Central America since the Visit Panamá Cup.

== Past finals ==
=== Singles ===
Year	Champion	Runner-up	Score
2026			

=== Doubles ===
Year	Champions	Runners-up	Score
2026			

== See also ==
- Sport in El Salvador
