= 2026 Kobe Challenger – Singles =

Singles
- 2026 Kobe Challenger

Final
- Champion: (Japan) Yosuke Watanuki
- Runner-up: (United Kingdom) Liam Broady
- Score: 6–3, 6–4

Events
Singles	Doubles
- Kobe Challenger

Yosuke Watanuki was the defending champion and successfully retained his title after defeating Liam Broady 6–3, 6–4 in the final.

== Seeds ==
1. (China) Zhang Zhizhen (first round)
2. (Japan) Taro Daniel (quarterfinals)
3. (United States) Keegan Smith (second round)
4. (Spain) David Jordà Sanchis (first round)
5. (United Kingdom) Liam Broady (final)
6. (United Kingdom) Billy Harris (quarterfinals)
7. (Japan) Rio Noguchi (second round)
8. (Japan) Yosuke Watanuki (champion)

== Draw ==
Key

- Q = Qualifier
- WC = Wild card
- LL = Lucky loser
- Alt = Alternate
- ITF = ITF entry
- PR = Protected ranking
- SR = Special ranking
- SE = Special exempt
- JE = Junior exempt
- JR = Junior Accelerator Programme entrant
- CO = College Accelerator Programme entrant
- NG = Next Gen Accelerator Program entrant
- w/o = Walkover
- r = Retired
- d = Defaulted

=== Finals ===
Semifinals
5	(United Kingdom) Liam Broady	6	6
(Japan) Jay Friend	2	1
Q	(Lebanon) Benjamin Hassan	6^{5}	1
8	(Japan) Yosuke Watanuki	7^{7}	6

Final
5	(United Kingdom) Liam Broady	3	4
8	(Japan) Yosuke Watanuki	6	6

=== Top half ===
First round
1	(China) Z Zhang	6^{5}	6^{5}
(Switzerland) Luca Stäheli	7^{7}	7^{7}
(Thailand) K Samrej	6	6
WC	(Japan) Yuta Tomida	1	4
(Serbia) O Milić	2	6	2
Q	(Thailand) M Jones	6	3	6
WC	(Japan) Naoya Honda	1	4
5	(United Kingdom) L Broady	6	6
4	(Spain) D Jordà Sanchis	5	3
(Chinese Taipei) Y-h Hsu	7	6
Q	(Japan) Takuya Kumasaka	3	6^{5}
(China) Y Zhou	6	7^{7}
(Croatia) M Poljičak	4	6	3
(Japan) J Friend	6	3	6
(Malaysia) Mitsuki Wei Kang Leong	2	6	2
7	(Japan) R Noguchi	6	3	6

Second round
(Switzerland) L Stäheli	3	5
(Thailand) K Samrej	6	7
Q	(Thailand) M Jones	5	1
5	(United Kingdom) L Broady	7	6
(Chinese Taipei) Y-h Hsu	5	6^{4}
(China) Y Zhou	7	7^{7}
(Japan) J Friend	6	2	7
7	(Japan) R Noguchi	4	6	5

Quarterfinals
(Thailand) K Samrej	4	2
5	(United Kingdom) L Broady	6	6
(China) Y Zhou	4	4
(Japan) J Friend	6	6

Semifinals
5	(United Kingdom) L Broady	6	6
(Japan) J Friend	2	1

=== Bottom half ===
First round
6	(United Kingdom) B Harris	7^{8}	6
Q	(Japan) Koki Matsuda	6^{6}	2
Q	(Japan) T Ichikawa	2	3
(Germany) M Schönhaus	6	6
(Japan) K Uchida	6	5	2
Q	(Lebanon) B Hassan	3	7	6
JR	(Germany) N McDonald	3	6	4
3	(United States) K Smith	6	3	6
8	(Japan) Y Watanuki	6	6
(China) J Cui	2	0
WC	(Japan) Ryuki Matsuda	4	5
(China) F Sun	6	7
Q	(Japan) M Imamura	6	6
(Japan) Y Shimizu	1	2
(Poland) D Michalski	4	1
2	(Japan) T Daniel	6	6

Second round
6	(United Kingdom) B Harris	7^{7}	6
(Germany) M Schönhaus	6^{4}	3
Q	(Lebanon) B Hassan	3	6	6
3	(United States) K Smith	6	1	2
8	(Japan) Y Watanuki	6	6
(China) F Sun	4	1
Q	(Japan) M Imamura	2	6^{2}
2	(Japan) T Daniel	6	7^{7}

Quarterfinals
6	(United Kingdom) B Harris	3	2
Q	(Lebanon) B Hassan	6	6
8	(Japan) Y Watanuki	4	6	6
2	(Japan) T Daniel	6	1	1

Semifinals
Q	(Lebanon) B Hassan	6^{5}	1
8	(Japan) Y Watanuki	7^{7}	6
