= 2026 Stockholm Open – Singles =

Singles
- 2026 Stockholm Open

Final
- Champion: (United States) Taylor Fritz
- Runner-up: (Argentina) Thiago Agustín Tirante
- Score: 6–2, 4–6, 7–6^{(7–3)}
- Date: 14 November 2026

Details
- Draw: 28 (4 Q / 3 WC)
- Seeds: 8

Events
| Singles | Doubles |
- Stockholm Open

At the 2026 Stockholm Open, Taylor Fritz defeated Thiago Agustín Tirante in the final, 6–2, 4–6, 7–6^{(7–3)} to win the men's singles tennis title. The tournament took place on indoor hard courts in Stockholm, Sweden, and was an ATP 250 level event. It was Fritz's first indoor title.

Casper Ruud was the defending champion, but lost in the second round to Alexander Shevchenko.

== Seeds ==
The top four seeds received a bye into the second round.

1. (United States) Taylor Fritz (champion)
2. (Norway) Casper Ruud (second round)
3. (Italy) Lorenzo Musetti (semifinals)
4. (Chile) Alejandro Tabilo (semifinals)
5. (Argentina) Tomás Martín Etcheverry (second round, withdrew)
6. (United States) Alex Michelsen (quarterfinals)
7. (France) Ugo Humbert (quarterfinals)
8. (Belgium) Zizou Bergs (first round)

== Draw ==
Key

- Q = Qualifier
- WC = Wild card
- LL = Lucky loser
- Alt = Alternate
- ITF = ITF entry
- PR = Protected ranking
- SR = Special ranking
- SE = Special exempt
- JE = Junior exempt
- JR = Junior Accelerator Programme entrant
- CO = College Accelerator Programme entrant
- NG = Next Gen Accelerator Program entrant
- w/o = Walkover
- r = Retired
- d = Defaulted

=== Finals ===
Semifinals
1 | (United States) Taylor Fritz | 6 | 6
3 | (Italy) Lorenzo Musetti | 4 | 2
4 | (Chile) Alejandro Tabilo | 5 | 6^{1}
(Argentina) Thiago Agustín Tirante | 7 | 7^{7}

Final
1 | (United States) Taylor Fritz | 6 | 4 | 7^{7}
(Argentina) Thiago Agustín Tirante | 2 | 6 | 6^{3}

=== Top half ===
First round
(Australia) J Duckworth | 5 | 0
(United Kingdom) C Norrie | 7 | 6
(France) A Rinderknech | 6^{4} | 6 | 4
(Serbia) M Kecmanović | 7^{7} | 4 | 6
PR | (Denmark) H Rune | 6 | 6
8 | (Belgium) Z Bergs | 3 | 4
WC | (Sweden) L Borg | 3 | 2
Q | (United Kingdom) T Samuel | 6 | 6
(Czech Republic) T Macháč | 3 | 4
Q | (Croatia) B Gojo | 6 | 6
(Paraguay) AD Vallejo | 4 | 3
7 | (France) U Humbert | 6 | 6

Second round
1 | (United States) T Fritz | 7 | 6
(United Kingdom) C Norrie | 5 | 3
(Serbia) M Kecmanović | 6 | 1 | 4
PR | (Denmark) H Rune | 2 | 6 | 6
3 | (Italy) L Musetti | 6 | 6
Q | (United Kingdom) T Samuel | 1 | 4
Q | (Croatia) B Gojo | 2 | 4
7 | (France) U Humbert | 6 | 6

Quarterfinals
1 | (United States) T Fritz | w/o
PR | (Denmark) H Rune
3 | (Italy) L Musetti | 7^{7} | 3 | 6
7 | (France) U Humbert | 6^{5} | 6 | 4

Semifinals
1 | (United States) T Fritz | 6 | 6
3 | (Italy) L Musetti | 4 | 2

=== Bottom half ===
First round
6 | (United States) A Michelsen | 6 | 6
(Germany) Y Hanfmann | 2 | 3
WC | (Sweden) E Ymer | 1 | 6^{4}
(Argentina) JM Cerúndolo | 6 | 7^{7}
Q | (Italy) L Sonego | 6 | 7^{7}
(France) Q Halys | 4 | 6^{4}
5 | (Argentina) TM Etcheverry | 6 | 6^{6} | 6
WC | (Sweden) M Dahlin | 4 | 7^{8} | 3
(Argentina) TA Tirante | 7^{7} | 6
(Spain) J Munar | 6^{3} | 3
LL | (France) A Mannarino | 1 | 3
Q | (Kazakhstan) A Shevchenko | 6 | 6

Second round
6 | (United States) A Michelsen | 6 | 6
(Argentina) JM Cerúndolo | 3 | 2
Q | (Italy) L Sonego | 6^{2} | 7^{9} | 5
4 | (Chile) A Tabilo | 7^{7} | 6^{7} | 7
5 | (Argentina) TM Etcheverry
(Argentina) TA Tirante | w/o
Q | (Kazakhstan) A Shevchenko | 6^{5} | 6 | 6
2 | (Norway) C Ruud | 7^{7} | 4 | 3

Quarterfinals
6 | (United States) A Michelsen | 5 | 6^{2}
4 | (Chile) A Tabilo | 7 | 7^{7}
(Argentina) TA Tirante | 7^{7} | 6^{5} | 6
Q | (Kazakhstan) A Shevchenko | 6^{5} | 7^{7} | 3

Semifinals
4 | (Chile) A Tabilo | 5 | 6^{1}
(Argentina) TA Tirante | 7 | 7^{7}

== Qualifying ==
=== Seeds ===
1. (France) Adrian Mannarino (qualifying competition, lucky loser)
2. (Georgia (country)) Nikoloz Basilashvili (qualifying competition)
3. (Bosnia and Herzegovina) Damir Džumhur (first round)
4. (United Kingdom) Jacob Fearnley (qualifying competition)
5. (United Kingdom) Toby Samuel (qualified)
6. (Italy) Lorenzo Sonego (qualified)
7. (Kazakhstan) Alexander Shevchenko (qualified)
8. (Croatia) Borna Gojo (qualified)

=== Qualifiers ===
1. (United Kingdom) Toby Samuel
2. (Croatia) Borna Gojo
3. (Italy) Lorenzo Sonego
4. (Kazakhstan) Alexander Shevchenko

=== Lucky loser ===
1. (France) Adrian Mannarino

=== Qualifying draw ===
==== First qualifier ====
First round
1 | (France) Adrian Mannarino | 6 | 6
WC | (Sweden) Jan Simonsson | 4 | 1
WC | (Sweden) Karl Friberg | 6^{5} | 2
5 | (United Kingdom) Toby Samuel | 7^{7} | 6

Qualifying competition
1 | (France) Adrian Mannarino | 6 | 5 | 1
5 | (United Kingdom) Toby Samuel | 3 | 7 | 6

==== Second qualifier ====
First round
2 | (Georgia (country)) Nikoloz Basilashvili | 6 | 6
(Italy) Francesco Passaro | 4 | 3
(Switzerland) Mika Brunold | 5 | 6 | 6^{7}
8 | (Croatia) Borna Gojo | 7 | 4 | 7^{9}

Qualifying competition
2 | (Georgia (country)) Nikoloz Basilashvili | 3 | 6^{5}
8 | (Croatia) Borna Gojo | 6 | 7^{7}

==== Third qualifier ====
First round
3 | (Bosnia and Herzegovina) Damir Džumhur | 5 | 3
(Spain) Iñaki Montes de la Torre | 7 | 6
Alt | (Sweden) Olle Wallin | 4 | 6^{6}
6 | (Italy) Lorenzo Sonego | 6 | 7^{8}

Qualifying competition
(Spain) Iñaki Montes de la Torre | 5 | 3
6 | (Italy) Lorenzo Sonego | 7 | 6

==== Fourth qualifier ====
First round
4 | (United Kingdom) Jacob Fearnley | 6 | 6
(France) Arthur Nagel | 0 | 2
Alt | (Norway) Viktor Durasovic | 1 | 1
7 | (Kazakhstan) Alexander Shevchenko | 6 | 6

Qualifying competition
4 | (United Kingdom) Jacob Fearnley | 2 | 4
7 | (Kazakhstan) Alexander Shevchenko | 6 | 6
