= 2026 El Salvador Open =

- Date: 23–29 November
- Edition: 1st
- Surface: Hard
- Location: San Salvador, El Salvador
- El Salvador Open

The 2026 El Salvador Open was a professional tennis tournament played on hard courts. It was the first edition of the tournament which was part of the 2026 ATP Challenger Tour. It took place in San Salvador, El Salvador between 23 and 29 November 2026.

== Singles main-draw entrants ==
=== Seeds ===
| Country | Player | Rank^{1} | Seed |
|---|---|---|---|
| FRA | Timo Legout | 334 | 1 |
| ARG | Luciano Emanuel Ambrogi | 336 | 2 |
| JAM | Blaise Bicknell | 389 | 3 |
| BRA | Mateus Alves | 417 | 4 |
| ISR | Amit Vales | 479 | 5 |
| BRA | Guto Miguel | 547 | 6 |
| BRA | Lucas Andrade da Silva | 574 | 7 |
| COL | Juan Sebastián Gómez | 588 | 8 |

- ^{1} Rankings are as of 16 November 2026.

=== Other entrants ===
The following players received wildcards into the singles main draw:

- (El Salvador) César Cruz
- (El Salvador) Diego Durán
- (Brazil) Guto Miguel

The following players received entry into the singles main draw as alternates:

- (Ecuador) Patricio Alvarado
- (Argentina) Segundo Goity Zapico

The following players received entry from the qualifying draw:

== Champions ==
=== Singles ===
- vs.

=== Doubles ===
- / vs. /
