= 2026 Uruguay Open – Singles =

Singles
- 2026 Uruguay Open

Final
- Champion: (Brazil) Thiago Seyboth Wild
- Runner-up: (Brazil) Matheus Pucinelli de Almeida
- Score: 6–3, 6–4

Events
Singles	Doubles
- Uruguay Open

Cristian Garín was the defending champion but chose not to defend his title.

Thiago Seyboth Wild won the title after defeating Matheus Pucinelli de Almeida 6–3, 6–4 in the final.

== Seeds ==
1. (Argentina) Camilo Ugo Carabelli (withdrew)
2. (Brazil) Thiago Seyboth Wild (champion)
3. (Bolivia) Hugo Dellien (first round)
4. (Portugal) Henrique Rocha (second round)
5. (Spain) Max Alcalá Gurri (first round)
6. (Argentina) Francisco Comesaña (first round)
7. (Denmark) Elmer Møller (semifinals)
8. (Argentina) Lautaro Midón (first round)

== Draw ==
Key

- Q = Qualifier
- WC = Wild card
- LL = Lucky loser
- Alt = Alternate
- ITF = ITF entry
- PR = Protected ranking
- SR = Special ranking
- SE = Special exempt
- JE = Junior exempt
- JR = Junior Accelerator Programme entrant
- CO = College Accelerator Programme entrant
- NG = Next Gen Accelerator Program entrant
- w/o = Walkover
- r = Retired
- d = Defaulted

=== Finals ===
Semifinals
(Brazil) Matheus Pucinelli de Almeida	6	6
(Argentina) Guido Iván Justo	3	4
7	(Denmark) Elmer Møller	0	4
2	(Brazil) Thiago Seyboth Wild	6	6

Final
(Brazil) Matheus Pucinelli de Almeida	3	4
2	(Brazil) Thiago Seyboth Wild	6	6

=== Top half ===
First round
LL	(Brazil) P Boscardin Dias	4	3
Q	(Brazil) F Meligeni Alves	6	6
Alt	(Chile) M Soto	4	1
(Argentina) A Barrena	6	6
(Brazil) M Pucinelli de Almeida	6	6
WC	(Chile) N Jarry	4	4
(Bolivia) JC Prado Ángelo	6	3	6
8	(Argentina) L Midón	2	6	3
4	(Portugal) H Rocha	6	6
WC	(Uruguay) Federico Aguilar Cardozo	4	3
(Argentina) GI Justo	3	6	6
(Spain) D Rincón	6	3	4
SE	(Uruguay) F Roncadelli	6	6
(Chile) T Barrios Vera	3	3
(Argentina) JM La Serna	6	3	6
6	(Argentina) F Comesaña	4	6	1

Second round
Q	(Brazil) F Meligeni Alves	7^{7}	4	6
(Argentina) A Barrena	6^{2}	6	4
(Brazil) M Pucinelli de Almeida	6	6
(Bolivia) JC Prado Ángelo	3	2
4	(Portugal) H Rocha	6	3	3
(Argentina) GI Justo	3	6	6
SE	(Uruguay) F Roncadelli	6	6^{1}	7^{7}
(Argentina) JM La Serna	3	7^{7}	6^{2}

Quarterfinals
Q	(Brazil) F Meligeni Alves	3	0
(Brazil) M Pucinelli de Almeida	6	6
(Argentina) GI Justo	6	2	6
SE	(Uruguay) F Roncadelli	3	6	1

Semifinals
(Brazil) M Pucinelli de Almeida	6	6
(Argentina) GI Justo	3	4

=== Bottom half ===
First round
7	(Denmark) E Møller	6	6
Q	(Argentina) Thiago Cigarrán	4	1
(Peru) JP Varillas	4	6	4
(Peru) G Bueno	6	2	6
(Argentina) GA Olivieri	7	1	6
Q	(Argentina) G Villanueva	5	6	3
(United States) T Boyer	6	1	6
3	(Bolivia) H Dellien	4	6	3
5	(Spain) M Alcalá Gurri	1	6	1
Q	(Spain) O Roca Batalla	6	4	6
Alt	(Argentina) V Aboian	7	6^{5}	4
(Czech Republic) Z Kolář	5	7^{7}	6
WC	(Uruguay) J Aguilar Cardozo	6	6^{7}	2
Q	(Spain) C Sánchez Jover	4	7^{9}	6
Q	(Argentina) N Kicker	5	3
2	(Brazil) T Seyboth Wild	7	6

Second round
7	(Denmark) E Møller	7^{7}	6
(Peru) G Bueno	6^{5}	1
(Argentina) GA Olivieri	2	7	6^{5}
(United States) T Boyer	6	5	7^{7}
Q	(Spain) O Roca Batalla	6	6
(Czech Republic) Z Kolář	3	4
Q	(Spain) C Sánchez Jover	3	6^{4}
2	(Brazil) T Seyboth Wild	6	7^{7}

Quarterfinals
7	(Denmark) E Møller	2	6	6
(United States) T Boyer	6	0	1
Q	(Spain) O Roca Batalla	6^{3}	7	3
2	(Brazil) T Seyboth Wild	7^{7}	5	6

Semifinals
7	(Denmark) E Møller	0	4
2	(Brazil) T Seyboth Wild	6	6
