= Isaac Becroft =

New Zealand tennis player (born 2000)

- Country (sports): New Zealand
- Born: 29 October 2000 (age 26) Wanganui, New Zealand
- Height: 1.80 m (5 ft 11 in)
- Plays: Right-handed (two-handed backhand)
- College: Oklahoma State University
- Prize money: US $59,958

Singles
- Career record: 0-3
- Career titles: 0
- Highest ranking: No. 507 (16 November 2026)
- Current ranking: No. 507 (16 November 2026)

Doubles
- Career record: 0-0
- Career titles: 0
- Highest ranking: No. 302 (9 November 2026)
- Current ranking: No. 304 (16 November 2026)
- Last updated on: 16 November 2026.

Isaac Becroft (born 29 October 2000) is a New Zealand tennis player. He has a career-high singles ranking of No. 507 achieved on 16 November 2026 and a doubles ranking of No. 302 achieved on 9 November 2026.

== Career ==
He won the 2020 men's singles title at the Wellington Tennis Open before moving to the United States to attend Oklahoma State University.

He made his debut playing singles for the New Zealand Davis Cup team against Finland in September 2022, and continued to be selected for the team in 2023. In July 2023, playing alongside James Watt, he won the men's doubles title at the Caloundra International (M15) event on the Sunshine Coast in Queensland.

In September 2024, he won the doubles title at the ITF $15,000 tournament in Fayetteville, Arkansas, with his French partner Timo Legout.

He won a wildcard into the main draw of the 2025 ASB Classic in Auckland in January 2025 for his ATP Tour debut, after winning Tennis New Zealand's wildcard playoff event in Te Anau. In the first round he lost against Zizou Bergs of Belgium.
