= 2022 Sydney Tennis Classic – Women's singles =

Women's singles
- 2022 Sydney Tennis Classic

Final
- Champion: (Spain) Paula Badosa
- Runner-up: (Czech Republic) Barbora Krejčíková
- Score: 6–3, 4–6, 7–6^{(7–4)}

Details
- Draw: 30 (6 Q / 2 WC)
- Seeds: 8

Events
| Singles | men | women |
| Doubles | men | women |
| ← 2019 · | Sydney International | · 2023 → |

Paula Badosa defeated Barbora Krejčíková in the final, 6–3, 4–6, 7–6^{(7–4)} to win the women's singles tennis title at the 2022 Sydney Tennis Classic. Krejčíková reached the final after having saved seven match points in her semifinal match against Anett Kontaveit.

Petra Kvitová was the defending champion after winning the previous tournament in 2019, but she lost to Ons Jabeur in the second round.

== Seeds ==
The top two seeds received a bye into the second round.

1. (Australia) Ashleigh Barty (withdrew)
2. (Spain) Garbiñe Muguruza (quarterfinals)
3. (Czech Republic) Barbora Krejčíková (final)
4. (Estonia) Anett Kontaveit (semifinals)
5. (Spain) Paula Badosa (champion)
6. (Poland) Iga Świątek (withdrew)
7. (Tunisia) Ons Jabeur (quarterfinals, retired)
8. (United States) Sofia Kenin (first round)
9. (Kazakhstan) Elena Rybakina (second round, withdrew)

== Draw ==
=== Key ===
- Q = Qualifier
- WC = Wild card
- LL = Lucky loser
- Alt = Alternate
- ITF = ITF entry
- PR = Protected ranking
- SR = Special ranking
- SE = Special exempt
- JE = Junior exempt
- JR = Junior Accelerator Programme entrant
- CO = College Accelerator Programme entrant
- NG = Next Gen Accelerator Program entrant
- w/o = Walkover
- r = Retired
- d = Defaulted

=== Finals ===
Semifinals
3 | (Czech Republic) Barbora Krejčíková | 0 | 6 | 7^{14}
4 | (Estonia) Anett Kontaveit | 6 | 4 | 6^{12}
5 | (Spain) Paula Badosa | 6 | 6
(Russia) Daria Kasatkina | 2 | 2

Final
3 | (Czech Republic) Barbora Krejčíková | 3 | 6 | 6^{4}
5 | (Spain) Paula Badosa | 6 | 4 | 7^{7}

=== Top half ===
First round
WC | (Australia) P Hon | 6^{5} | 5
(Romania) J Cristian | 7^{7} | 7
(United States) J Pegula | 4 | 6^{3}
(France) C Garcia | 6 | 7^{7}
(United Kingdom) E Raducanu | 0 | 1
9 | (Kazakhstan) E Rybakina | 6 | 6
4 | (Estonia) A Kontaveit | 6 | 6
(China) S Zhang | 3 | 3
Q | (Romania) E-G Ruse | 6 | 3 | 6
Q | (Poland) M Fręch | 2 | 6 | 4
(Czech Republic) P Kvitová | 3 | 7^{7} | 7
(Netherlands) A Rus | 6 | 6^{4} | 5
WC | (Australia) A Sharma | 1 | 3
7 | (Tunisia) O Jabeur | 6 | 6

Second round
3 | (Czech Republic) B Krejčíková | 6 | 7
(Romania) J Cristian | 1 | 5
(France) C Garcia | w/o
9 | (Kazakhstan) E Rybakina
4 | (Estonia) A Kontaveit | 6 | 6
Q | (Romania) E-G Ruse | 3 | 1
(Czech Republic) P Kvitová | 4 | 4
7 | (Tunisia) O Jabeur | 6 | 6

Quarterfinals
3 | (Czech Republic) B Krejčíková | 6 | 6
(France) C Garcia | 0 | 2
4 | (Estonia) A Kontaveit | 6 | 0
7 | (Tunisia) O Jabeur | 4 | 0^{r}

Semifinals
3 | (Czech Republic) B Krejčíková | 0 | 6 | 7^{14}
4 | (Estonia) A Kontaveit | 6 | 4 | 6^{12}

=== Bottom half ===
First round
5 | (Spain) P Badosa | 7^{7} | 6
(Latvia) J Ostapenko | 6^{1} | 1
(Australia) A Tomljanović | 6 | 6
Q | (Slovakia) AK Schmiedlová | 2 | 3
Q | (Mexico) G Olmos | 4 | 1
LL | (France) O Dodin | 6 | 6
(Switzerland) B Bencic | 6 | 6
Q | (Brazil) B Haddad Maia | 3 | 2
8 | (United States) S Kenin | 4 | 0
(Russia) D Kasatkina | 6 | 6
LL | (France) F Ferro | 2 | 6^{5}
(Belgium) E Mertens | 6 | 7^{7}
Q | (Japan) E Shibahara | 4 | 4
(Russia) E Alexandrova | 6 | 6

Second round
5 | (Spain) P Badosa | 6 | 6
(Australia) A Tomljanović | 3 | 4
LL | (France) O Dodin | 6 | 5 | 3
(Switzerland) B Bencic | 2 | 7 | 6
(Russia) D Kasatkina | 6 | 6
(Belgium) E Mertens | 3 | 4
(Russia) E Alexandrova | 1 | 6^{4}
2 | (Spain) G Muguruza | 6 | 7^{7}

Quarterfinals
5 | (Spain) P Badosa | 7^{8} | 3 | 6
(Switzerland) B Bencic | 6^{6} | 6 | 3
(Russia) D Kasatkina | 6 | 6
2 | (Spain) G Muguruza | 4 | 4

Semifinals
5 | (Spain) P Badosa | 6 | 6
(Russia) D Kasatkina | 2 | 2

== Qualifying ==
=== Seeds ===
1. (Brazil) Beatriz Haddad Maia (qualified)
2. (Slovakia) Anna Karolína Schmiedlová (qualified)
3. (Romania) Elena-Gabriela Ruse (qualified)
4. (France) Océane Dodin (qualifying competition, lucky loser)
5. (United States) Claire Liu (qualifying competition)
6. (Hungary) Panna Udvardy (first round)
7. (France) Fiona Ferro (qualifying competition, lucky loser)
8. (Poland) Magdalena Fręch (qualified)
9. (France) Diane Parry (qualifying competition)
10. (Japan) Ena Shibahara (qualified)
11. (Germany) Vivian Heisen (qualifying competition)
12. (Australia) Gabriella Da Silva-Fick (first round)

=== Qualifiers ===
1. (Brazil) Beatriz Haddad Maia
2. (Slovakia) Anna Karolína Schmiedlová
3. (Romania) Elena-Gabriela Ruse
4. (Poland) Magdalena Fręch
5. (Japan) Ena Shibahara
6. (Mexico) Giuliana Olmos

=== Lucky losers ===
1. (France) Océane Dodin
2. (France) Fiona Ferro

=== Draw ===
==== First qualifier ====
First round
1 | (Brazil) Beatriz Haddad Maia | 6 | 6
(China) Yang Zhaoxuan | 4 | 4
(Canada) Gabriela Dabrowski | 6 | 6
12 | (Australia) Gabriella Da Silva-Fick | 3 | 0

Qualifying competition
1 | (Brazil) Beatriz Haddad Maia | 6 | 3 | 6
(Canada) Gabriela Dabrowski | 3 | 6 | 3

==== Second qualifier ====
First round
2 | (Slovakia) Anna Karolína Schmiedlová | 6 | 6
WC | (Australia) Roisin Gilheany | 2 | 1
(Australia) Alicia Smith | 1 | 6 | 0^{r}
11 | (Germany) Vivian Heisen | 6 | 1 | 3

Qualifying competition
2 | (Slovakia) Anna Karolína Schmiedlová | 6 | 6
11 | (Germany) Vivian Heisen | 0 | 1

==== Third qualifier ====
First round
3 | (Romania) Elena-Gabriela Ruse | 6 | 6
WC | (Australia) Alexandra Osborne | 3 | 0
WC | (Australia) Michaela Haet | 1 | 1
7 | (France) Fiona Ferro | 6 | 6

Qualifying competition
3 | (Romania) Elena-Gabriela Ruse | 7^{7} | 6
7 | (France) Fiona Ferro | 6^{5} | 3

==== Fourth qualifier ====
First round
4 | (France) Océane Dodin | 6 | 6
WC | (Australia) Isabella Bozicevic | 1 | 1
WC | (Australia) Alana Parnaby | 2 | 2
8 | (Poland) Magdalena Fręch | 6 | 6

Qualifying competition
4 | (France) Océane Dodin | 2 | 5
8 | (Poland) Magdalena Fręch | 6 | 7

==== Fifth qualifier ====
First round
5 | (United States) Claire Liu | 6 | 6
WC | (Australia) Alison Bai | 1 | 1
WC | (Australia) Lisa Mays | 1 | 2
10 | (Japan) Ena Shibahara | 6 | 6

Qualifying competition
5 | (United States) Claire Liu | 3 | 4
10 | (Japan) Ena Shibahara | 6 | 6

==== Sixth qualifier ====
First round
6 | (Hungary) Panna Udvardy | 2 | 6 | 4
(Mexico) Giuliana Olmos | 6 | 3 | 6
(Ukraine) Lyudmyla Kichenok | 3 | 1
9 | (France) Diane Parry | 6 | 6

Qualifying competition
(Mexico) Giuliana Olmos | 6 | 3 | 6
9 | (France) Diane Parry | 4 | 6 | 3
