= 2022 Sydney Tennis Classic – Women's doubles =

Women's doubles
- 2022 Sydney Tennis Classic

Final
- Champions: (Kazakhstan) Anna Danilina (Brazil) Beatriz Haddad Maia
- Runners-up: (Germany) Vivian Heisen (Hungary) Panna Udvardy
- Score: 4–6, 7–5, [10–8]

Events
Singles	men	women
Doubles	men	women
← 2019 ·	Sydney International	· 2023 →

Anna Danilina and Beatriz Haddad Maia defeated Vivian Heisen and Panna Udvardy in the final, 4–6, 7–5, [10–8], to win the women's doubles tennis title at the 2022 Sydney Tennis Classic.

Aleksandra Krunić and Kateřina Siniaková were the reigning champions, but did not compete this year.

== Seeds ==
1. (Czech Republic) Barbora Krejčíková / (China) Zhang Shuai (first round)
2. (Japan) Shuko Aoyama / (Japan) Ena Shibahara (semifinals)
3. (Canada) Gabriela Dabrowski / (Mexico) Giuliana Olmos (first round)
4. (Chile) Alexa Guarachi / (United States) Nicole Melichar-Martinez (quarterfinals)

== Draw ==
=== Key ===
- Q = Qualifier
- WC = Wild card
- LL = Lucky loser
- Alt = Alternate
- SE = Special exempt
- PR = Protected ranking
- ITF = ITF entry
- JE = Junior exempt
- w/o = Walkover
- r = Retired
- d = Defaulted
- SR = Special ranking

=== Draw ===
First round
1	(Czech Republic) B Krejčíková (China) S Zhang	3	6^{4}
(China) Y Xu (China) Z Yang	6	7^{7}
(Indonesia) B Gumulya (Indonesia) J Rompies	2	3
(Ukraine) L Kichenok (Latvia) J Ostapenko	6	6
4	(Chile) A Guarachi (United States) N Melichar-Martinez	6	6
(Australia) G Da Silva-Fick (Australia) A Parnaby	4	4
(Croatia) D Jurak Schreiber (United States) D Krawczyk	6^{5}	6^{4}
(Germany) V Heisen (Hungary) P Udvardy	7^{7}	7^{7}
WC	(Australia) I Bozicevic (Australia) A Osborne	2	2
(Russia) E Alexandrova (Russia) N Dzalamidze	6	6
(Kazakhstan) A Danilina (Brazil) B Haddad Maia	6	6
3	(Canada) G Dabrowski (Mexico) G Olmos	4	2
(Netherlands) A Rus (Australia) A Sharma	6	6
WC	(Australia) M Haet (Australia) L Mays	2	0
(Australia) A Bai (Australia) A Smith
2	(Japan) S Aoyama (Japan) E Shibahara	w/o

Quarterfinals
(China) Y Xu (China) Z Yang	6^{4}	6	[10]
(Ukraine) L Kichenok (Latvia) J Ostapenko	7^{7}	3	[7]
4	(Chile) A Guarachi (United States) N Melichar-Martinez	6^{7}	6	[4]
(Germany) V Heisen (Hungary) P Udvardy	7^{9}	3	[10]
(Russia) E Alexandrova (Russia) N Dzalamidze	7	5	[8]
(Kazakhstan) A Danilina (Brazil) B Haddad Maia	5	7	[10]
(Netherlands) A Rus (Australia) A Sharma	4	0
2	(Japan) S Aoyama (Japan) E Shibahara	6	6

Semifinals
(China) Y Xu (China) Z Yang	2	3
(Germany) V Heisen (Hungary) P Udvardy	6	6
(Kazakhstan) A Danilina (Brazil) B Haddad Maia	6	6^{2}	[10]
2	(Japan) S Aoyama (Japan) E Shibahara	4	7^{7}	[6]

Final
(Germany) V Heisen (Hungary) P Udvardy	6	5	[8]
(Kazakhstan) A Danilina (Brazil) B Haddad Maia	4	7	[10]
