= 2022 NSW Open =

Tennis tournament

- Date: 31 October–6 November 2022
- Edition: 2nd (men); 8th (women)
- Category: ATP Challenger Tour; ITF Women's World Tennis Tour
- Prize money: $53,120 (men) $60,000 (women)
- Surface: Hard / Outdoor
- Location: Sydney, Australia

Champions

Men's singles
- (Chinese Taipei) Hsu Yu-hsiou

Women's singles
- (Japan) Mai Hontama

Men's doubles
- (Australia) Blake Ellis / (Australia) Tristan Schoolkate

Women's doubles
- (Australia) Destanee Aiava / (Australia) Lisa Mays
← 2013 ·	NSW Open	· 2023 →

The 2022 NSW Open was a professional tennis tournament played on outdoor hard courts. It was the second edition of the tournament which was part of the 2022 ATP Challenger Tour and the eighth edition of the tournament which was part of the 2022 ITF Women's World Tennis Tour. It took place in Sydney, Australia between 31 October and 6 November 2022.

== Champions ==
=== Men's singles ===
- (Chinese Taipei) Hsu Yu-hsiou def. (Australia) Marc Polmans 6–4, 7–6^{(7–5)}.

=== Women's singles ===
- (Japan) Mai Hontama def. (Australia) Petra Hule, 7–6^{(7–1)}, 3–6, 7–5.

=== Men's doubles ===
- (Australia) Blake Ellis / (Australia) Tristan Schoolkate def. (New Zealand) Ajeet Rai / (Japan) Yuta Shimizu 4–6, 7–5, [11–9].

=== Women's doubles ===
- (Australia) Destanee Aiava / (Australia) Lisa Mays def. (Australia) Alexandra Osborne / (Indonesia) Jessy Rompies, 5–7, 6–3, [10–6].

== Men's singles main draw entrants ==
=== Seeds ===
Country	Player	Rank^{1}	Seed
~~AUS~~	~~Jordan Thompson~~	~~85~~	~~1~~
AUS	James Duckworth	114	2
AUS	Aleksandar Vukic	145	3
AUS	Li Tu	190	4
AUS	Rinky Hijikata	192	5
AUS	Dane Sweeny	240	6
JPN	Rio Noguchi	246	7
AUS	Max Purcell	266	8

- ^{1} Rankings are as of 24 October 2022.

=== Other entrants ===
The following players received wildcards into the singles main draw:

- (Australia) Jeremy Beale
- (Australia) Alex Bolt
- (Australia) Blake Ellis

The following player received entry into the singles main draw as an alternate:

- (Northern Mariana Islands) Colin Sinclair

The following players received entry from the qualifying draw:

- (Australia) Mitchell Harper
- (Japan) Yuichiro Inui
- (Australia) Jeremy Jin
- (Australia) Luke Saville
- (Japan) Yusuke Takahashi
- (United Kingdom) Mark Whitehouse

The following player received entry as a lucky loser:

- (New Zealand) Ajeet Rai

== Women's singles main draw entrants ==
=== Seeds ===
Country	Player	Rank^{1}	Seed
~~AUS~~	~~Jaimee Fourlis~~	~~171~~	~~1~~
AUS	Maddison Inglis	195	2
KOR	Han Na-lae	201	3
AUS	Olivia Gadecki	221	4
AUS	Kimberly Birrell	240	5
AUS	Lizette Cabrera	241	6
JPN	Mai Hontama	275	7
JPN	Himeno Sakatsume	312	8

- ^{1} Rankings are as of 24 October 2022.

=== Other entrants ===
The following players received wildcards into the singles main draw:

- (Australia) Petra Hule
- (Australia) Tina Nadine Smith

The following players received entry from the qualifying draw:

- (United States) Makenna Jones
- (Australia) Lisa Mays
- (Australia) Kaylah McPhee
- (Japan) Junri Namigata
- (Japan) Michika Ozeki
- (Germany) Sarah-Rebecca Sekulic
- (Ukraine) Marianna Zakarlyuk
- (Slovakia) Zuzana Zlochová

The following player received entry as a lucky loser:

- (Australia) Sara Nayar
