= 2013 Nature's Way Sydney Tennis International – Men's doubles =

Men's doubles
- 2013 Nature's Way Sydney Tennis International

Final
- Champions: (Australia) Brydan Klein (Australia) Dane Propoggia
- Runners-up: (Australia) Alex Bolt (Australia) Nick Kyrgios
- Score: 6–4, 4–6, [11–9]

Events
Singles	men	women
Doubles	men	women
Nature's Way Sydney Tennis International	· 2022 →

This was the first edition of the tournament.

Brydan Klein and Dane Propoggia defeated Alex Bolt and Nick Kyrgios 6–4, 4–6, [11–9] in the final to win the title.

== Seeds ==
1. (Australia) Brydan Klein / (Australia) Dane Propoggia (champions)
2. (Australia) Samuel Groth / (Australia) John-Patrick Smith (withdrew)
3. (India) Purav Raja / (India) Divij Sharan (semifinals)
4. (Australia) Chris Guccione / (Australia) Matt Reid (semifinals)

== Draw ==
Key

- Q = Qualifier
- WC = Wild card
- LL = Lucky loser
- Alt = Alternate
- ITF = ITF entry
- PR = Protected ranking
- SR = Special ranking
- SE = Special exempt
- JE = Junior exempt
- JR = Junior Accelerator Programme entrant
- CO = College Accelerator Programme entrant
- NG = Next Gen Accelerator Program entrant
- w/o = Walkover
- r = Retired
- d = Defaulted

=== Draw ===
First round
1	(Australia) B Klein (Australia) D Propoggia	7	6
(Japan) Y Sugita (Japan) Y Uchiyama	5	2
WC	(Australia) Jack Schipanski (Australia) J Thompson	5	6^{3}
WC	(Australia) Jacob Grills (Australia) B Mousley	7	7^{7}
4	(Australia) C Guccione (Australia) M Reid	6	6
(South Africa) R Roelofse (Indonesia) C Rungkat	1	4
(Australia) G Jones (Canada) P Polansky	7^{7}	3	[12]
(Australia) M Barton (Australia) J Millman	6^{4}	6	[10]
(South Korea) S-y Jeong (Japan) K Takeuchi	1	0^{r}
(New Zealand) A Sitak (New Zealand) J Statham	6	0
(Australia) C Ebelthite (France) S Robert	6^{3}	6	[6]
3	(India) P Raja (India) D Sharan	7^{7}	4	[10]
(Australia) A Bolt (Australia) N Kyrgios	6	4	[11]
WC	(Australia) J Andrijic (Australia) S Kadir	4	6	[9]
(Italy) A Arnaboldi (Slovakia) I Klec	6	6
Alt	(Australia) R Agar (Austria) S Bader	3	4

Quarterfinals
1	(Australia) B Klein (Australia) D Propoggia	6	7
WC	(Australia) J Grills (Australia) B Mousley	2	5
4	(Australia) C Guccione (Australia) M Reid	6	6
(Australia) G Jones (Canada) P Polansky	1	1
(New Zealand) A Sitak (New Zealand) J Statham	4	4
3	(India) P Raja (India) D Sharan	6	6
(Australia) A Bolt (Australia) N Kyrgios	6	6
(Italy) A Arnaboldi (Slovakia) I Klec	1	3

Semifinals
1	(Australia) B Klein (Australia) D Propoggia	1	7	[10]
4	(Australia) C Guccione (Australia) M Reid	6	5	[7]
3	(India) P Raja (India) D Sharan	6^{3}	4
(Australia) A Bolt (Australia) N Kyrgios	7^{7}	6

Final
1	(Australia) B Klein (Australia) D Propoggia	6	4	[11]
(Australia) A Bolt (Australia) N Kyrgios	4	6	[9]
