= 2023 NSW Open – Women's doubles =

Women's doubles
- 2023 NSW Open

Final
- Champions: (Australia) Destanee Aiava (Australia) Maddison Inglis
- Runners-up: (Japan) Kyōka Okamura (Japan) Ayano Shimizu
- Score: 6–0, 6–0

Events
Singles	men	women
Doubles	men	women
← 2022 ·	NSW Open	· 2024 →

Destanee Aiava and Lisa Mays were the defending champions but Mays chose not to participate.

Aiava played alongside Maddison Inglis and successfully defended her title, defeating Kyōka Okamura and Ayano Shimizu in the final, 6–0, 6–0.

== Seeds ==
1. (China) Ma Yexin / (Japan) Moyuka Uchijima (first round)
2. (Australia) Talia Gibson / (Australia) Priscilla Hon (quarterfinals, withdrew)
3. (Australia) Kaylah McPhee / (Australia) Astra Sharma (quarterfinals)
4. (Australia) Destanee Aiava / (Australia) Maddison Inglis (champions)

== Draw ==
Key

- Q = Qualifier
- WC = Wild card
- LL = Lucky loser
- Alt = Alternate
- ITF = ITF entry
- PR = Protected ranking
- SR = Special ranking
- SE = Special exempt
- JE = Junior exempt
- JR = Junior Accelerator Programme entrant
- CO = College Accelerator Programme entrant
- NG = Next Gen Accelerator Program entrant
- w/o = Walkover
- r = Retired
- d = Defaulted

=== Draw ===
First round
1	(China) Y Ma (Japan) M Uchijima	6	4	[7]
(Australia) L Fairclough (Australia) T McGiffin	2	6	[10]
(Japan) S Akita (Japan) E Hayashi	3	1
(South Korea) J-h Choi (Indonesia) B Gumulya	6	6
3	(Australia) K McPhee (Australia) A Sharma	7^{7}	3	[10]
(Australia) E Bolton (United States) M Horvit	6^{4}	6	[6]
(Japan) K Okamura (Japan) A Shimizu	3	6	[10]
(Japan) H Arakawa (Japan) N Arakawa	6	4	[8]
(Australia) R Gilheany (Australia) M Joint	6	6^{2}	[10]
(Czech Republic) M Bayerlová (Australia) G Da Silva-Fick	3	7^{7}	[6]
(New Zealand) M Barry (Australia) A Smith	3	1
4	(Australia) D Aiava (Australia) M Inglis	6	6
(Australia) A Parnaby (Australia) I Popovic	6	6
WC	(Australia) S McDonald (Australia) A Narker	1	1
Alt	(Australia) E Simmons (Australia) B Thompson	5	1
2	(Australia) T Gibson (Australia) P Hon	7	6

Quarterfinals
(Australia) L Fairclough (Australia) T McGiffin	0	6	[10]
(South Korea) J-h Choi (Indonesia) B Gumulya	6	4	[5]
3	(Australia) K McPhee (Australia) A Sharma	2	5
(Japan) K Okamura (Japan) A Shimizu	6	7
(Australia) R Gilheany (Australia) M Joint	6	2	[4]
4	(Australia) D Aiava (Australia) M Inglis	2	6	[10]
(Australia) A Parnaby (Australia) I Popovic	w/o
2	(Australia) T Gibson (Australia) P Hon

Semifinals
(Australia) L Fairclough (Australia) T McGiffin	3	1
(Japan) K Okamura (Japan) A Shimizu	6	6
4	(Australia) D Aiava (Australia) M Inglis	6	6
(Australia) A Parnaby (Australia) I Popovic	3	2

Final
(Japan) K Okamura (Japan) A Shimizu	0	0
4	(Australia) D Aiava (Australia) M Inglis	6	6
