= 2022 Sydney Tennis Classic =

- Date: 10–15 January 2022
- Edition: 128th
- Category: ATP 250; WTA 500
- Draw: 28S/24D (ATP); 30S/16D (WTA)
- Prize money: $521,000 (ATP) $703,580 (WTA)
- Surface: Outdoor hard courts
- Location: Sydney, New South Wales, Australia
- Venue: NSW Tennis Centre

Champions

Men's singles
- (Russia) Aslan Karatsev

Women's singles
- (Spain) Paula Badosa

Men's doubles
- (Australia) John Peers / (Slovakia) Filip Polášek

Women's doubles
- (Kazakhstan) Anna Danilina / (Brazil) Beatriz Haddad Maia
- Sydney International

The 2022 Sydney Tennis Classic was a tennis tournament on the 2022 ATP Tour and 2022 WTA Tour. It was a combined ATP Tour 250 and WTA 500 tournament played on outdoor hard courts in Sydney, New South Wales, Australia. This was the 128th edition of the tournament. The tournament took place at the NSW Tennis Centre from 10 to 15 January 2022.

== Champions ==
=== Men's singles ===
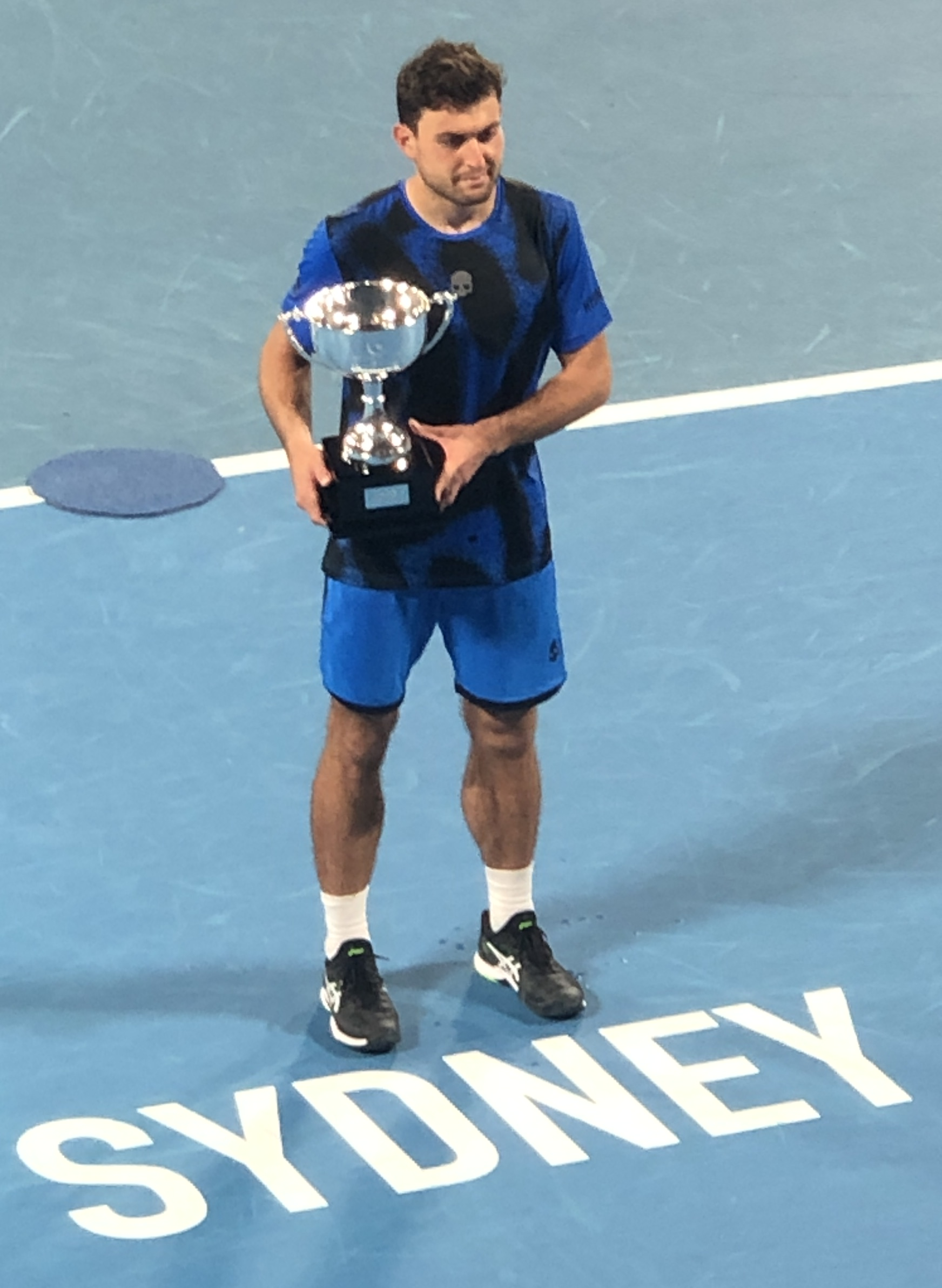
Men's singles champion Aslan Karatsev.

- (Russia) Aslan Karatsev def. (United Kingdom) Andy Murray 6–3, 6–3
- It was Karatsev's first singles title of the year and the 3rd, of his career.

=== Women's singles ===
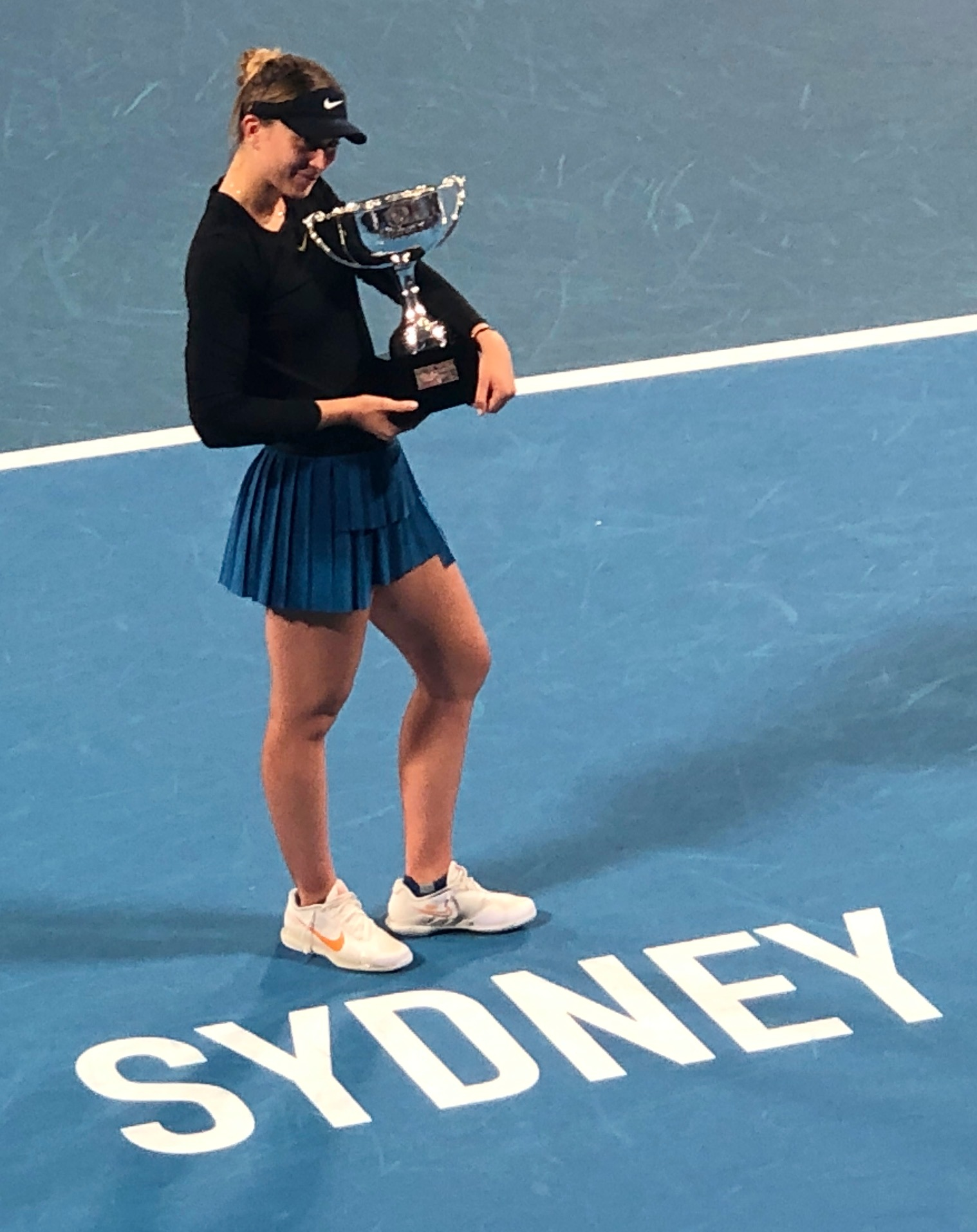
Women's singles champion Paula Badosa.

- (Spain) Paula Badosa def. (Czech Republic) Barbora Krejčíková 6–3, 4–6, 7–6^{(7–4)}

=== Men's doubles ===
- (Australia) John Peers / (Slovakia) Filip Polášek def. (Italy) Simone Bolelli / (Italy) Fabio Fognini, 7–5, 7–5

=== Women's doubles ===
- (Kazakhstan) Anna Danilina / (Brazil) Beatriz Haddad Maia def. (Germany) Vivian Heisen / (Hungary) Panna Udvardy 4–6, 7–5, [10–8]

== Points and prize money ==
=== Point distribution ===
Event	W	F	SF	QF	Round of 16	Round of 32	Q	Q2	Q1
Men's singles	250	150	90	45	20	0	12	6	0
Men's doubles	250	150	90	45	0	—N/a	—N/a	—N/a	—N/a
Women's singles	470	305	185	100	55	1	25	13	1
Women's doubles	470	305	185	100	1	—N/a	—N/a	—N/a	—N/a

=== Prize money ===
Event	W	F	SF	QF	Round of 16	Round of 32	Q2	Q1
Men's singles	$87,370	$48,365	$27,220	$15,490	$8,890	$5,200	$2,540	$1,320
Men's doubles *	$23,370	$13,210	$7,630	$4,320	$2,540	$1,520	—N/a	—N/a
Women's singles	$108,000	$66,800	$39,000	$18,685	$10,000	$6,750	$5,020	$2,585
Women's doubles *	$36,200	$22,000	$12,500	$6,500	$3,900	—N/a	—N/a	—N/a

_{*per team}

== ATP singles main-draw entrants ==
=== Seeds ===
Country	Player	Rank^{1}	Seed
RUS	Aslan Karatsev	20	1
GEO	Nikoloz Basilashvili	23	2
GBR	Dan Evans	24	3
ITA	Lorenzo Sonego	25	4
USA	Reilly Opelka	30	5
ITA	Fabio Fognini	32	6
ARG	Federico Delbonis	38	7
SRB	Dušan Lajović	39	8

^{1} Rankings are as of 3 January 2022.

=== Other entrants ===
The following players received wildcard entry into the singles main draw:

- ~~(Australia) Nick Kyrgios~~
- (United Kingdom) Andy Murray
- (Australia) Jordan Thompson

The following player received entry as a special exempt:

- (United States) Maxime Cressy

The following players received entry from the qualifying draw:

- (Argentina) Sebastián Báez
- (Norway) Viktor Durasovic
- (Australia) Christopher O'Connell
- (Czech Republic) Jiří Veselý

The following players received entry as lucky losers:

- (Germany) Daniel Altmaier
- (United States) Denis Kudla
- (Italy) Stefano Travaglia

=== Withdrawals ===
Before the tournament

- (Spain) Roberto Bautista Agut → replaced by (Australia) Alexei Popyrin
- (Australia) Alex de Minaur → replaced by (Serbia) Miomir Kecmanović
- (United States) Taylor Fritz → replaced by (United States) Marcos Giron
- (Chile) Cristian Garín → replaced by (France) Adrian Mannarino
- (Belarus) Ilya Ivashka → replaced by (France) Hugo Gaston
- (Serbia) Filip Krajinović → replaced by (United States) Brandon Nakashima
- (Australia) Nick Kyrgios → replaced by (Germany) Daniel Altmaier
- (Japan) Kei Nishikori → replaced by (Italy) Stefano Travaglia
- (Spain) Albert Ramos Viñolas → replaced by (United States) Denis Kudla
- (Austria) Dominic Thiem → replaced by (Spain) Pedro Martínez

Retirements

- (Belgium) David Goffin

== ATP doubles main-draw entrants ==
=== Seeds ===
Country	Player	Country	Player	Rank^{1}	Seed
~~CRO~~	~~Nikola Mektić~~	~~CRO~~	~~Mate Pavić~~	~~3~~	~~1~~
COL	Juan Sebastián Cabal	COL	Robert Farah	20	2
AUS	John Peers	SVK	Filip Polášek	22	3
GER	Tim Pütz	NZL	Michael Venus	33	4
GBR	Jamie Murray	BRA	Bruno Soares	35	5
GER	Kevin Krawietz	GER	Andreas Mies	63	6
ESA	Marcelo Arévalo	NED	Jean-Julien Rojer	69	7
KAZ	Andrey Golubev	CRO	Franko Škugor	81	8

- ^{1} Rankings are as of 3 January 2022.

=== Other entrants ===
The following pairs received wildcards into the doubles main draw:

- (Australia) Moerani Bouzige / (Australia) Matthew Romios
- (Australia) Nick Kyrgios / (Greece) Michail Pervolarakis

The following pair received entry using a protected ranking:

- (Germany) Daniel Altmaier / (Italy) Andreas Seppi

=== Withdrawals ===
Before the tournament

- (Italy) Simone Bolelli / (Argentina) Máximo González → replaced by (Italy) Simone Bolelli / (Italy) Fabio Fognini
- (Italy) Marco Cecchinato / (Italy) Andreas Seppi → replaced by (Germany) Daniel Altmaier / (Italy) Andreas Seppi
- (New Zealand) Marcus Daniell / (Brazil) Marcelo Demoliner → replaced by (New Zealand) Marcus Daniell / (United States) Denis Kudla
- (Austria) Oliver Marach / (United Kingdom) Jonny O'Mara → replaced by (France) Fabrice Martin / (United Kingdom) Jonny O'Mara

During the tournament

- (New Zealand) Marcus Daniell / (United States) Denis Kudla
- (Australia) Nick Kyrgios / (Greece) Michail Pervolarakis
- (Croatia) Nikola Mektić / (Croatia) Mate Pavić

== WTA singles main-draw entrants ==
=== Seeds ===
Country	Player	Rank^{1}	Seed
~~AUS~~	~~Ashleigh Barty~~	~~1~~	~~1~~
ESP	Garbiñe Muguruza	3	2
CZE	Barbora Krejčíková	5	3
EST	Anett Kontaveit	7	4
ESP	Paula Badosa	8	5
~~POL~~	~~Iga Świątek~~	~~9~~	~~6~~
TUN	Ons Jabeur	10	7
USA	Sofia Kenin	12	8
KAZ	Elena Rybakina	14	9

^{1} Rankings are as of 3 January 2022.

=== Other entrants ===
The following players received wildcard entry into the singles main draw:

- (Australia) Priscilla Hon
- (Australia) Astra Sharma

The following players received entry from the qualifying draw:

- (Poland) Magdalena Fręch
- (Brazil) Beatriz Haddad Maia
- (Mexico) Giuliana Olmos
- (Romania) Elena-Gabriela Ruse
- (Slovakia) Anna Karolína Schmiedlová
- (Japan) Ena Shibahara

The following players received entry as lucky losers:

- (France) Océane Dodin
- (France) Fiona Ferro

=== Withdrawals ===
Before the tournament

- (Australia) Ashleigh Barty → replaced by (France) Fiona Ferro
- (Canada) Leylah Fernandez → replaced by (Australia) Ajla Tomljanović
- (Romania) Simona Halep → replaced by (China) Zhang Shuai
- (Germany) Angelique Kerber → replaced by (Russia) Daria Kasatkina
- (Russia) Anastasia Pavlyuchenkova → replaced by (Russia) Ekaterina Alexandrova
- (Greece) Maria Sakkari → replaced by (Latvia) Jeļena Ostapenko
- (Poland) Iga Świątek → replaced by (France) Océane Dodin

During the tournament

- (Kazakhstan) Elena Rybakina (left thigh injury)

Retirements

- (Tunisia) Ons Jabeur (lower back injury)

== WTA doubles main-draw entrants ==
=== Seeds ===
Country	Player	Country	Player	Rank^{1}	Seed
CZE	Barbora Krejčíková	CHN	Zhang Shuai	10	1
JPN	Shuko Aoyama	JPN	Ena Shibahara	10	2
CAN	Gabriela Dabrowski	MEX	Giuliana Olmos	25	3
CHI	Alexa Guarachi	USA	Nicole Melichar-Martinez	25	4

- ^{1} Rankings are as of 3 January 2022.

=== Other entrants ===
The following pairs received wildcards into the doubles main draw:

- (Australia) Isabella Bozicevic / (Australia) Alexandra Osborne
- (Australia) Michaela Haet / (Australia) Lisa Mays

=== Withdrawals ===
Before the tournament

- (Hungary) Anna Bondár / (Netherlands) Arantxa Rus → replaced by (Netherlands) Arantxa Rus / (Australia) Astra Sharma
- (Russia) Natela Dzalamidze / (Russia) Vera Zvonareva → replaced by (Russia) Ekaterina Alexandrova / (Russia) Natela Dzalamidze
- (Croatia) Darija Jurak Schreiber / (Slovenia) Andreja Klepač → replaced by (Croatia) Darija Jurak Schreiber / (United States) Desirae Krawczyk
- (United States) Desirae Krawczyk / (United States) Bethanie Mattek-Sands → replaced by (Australia) Alison Bai / (Australia) Alicia Smith
- (United States) Jessica Pegula / (Australia) Storm Sanders → replaced by (Germany) Vivian Heisen / (Hungary) Panna Udvardy
- (Australia) Samantha Stosur / (China) Zhang Shuai → replaced by (Czech Republic) Barbora Krejčíková / (China) Zhang Shuai

During the tournament

- (Australia) Alison Bai / (Australia) Alicia Smith
