= 2023 NSW Open – Men's singles =

Men's singles
- 2023 NSW Open

Final
- Champion: (Japan) Taro Daniel
- Runner-up: (Australia) Marc Polmans
- Score: 6–2, 6–4

Events
Singles	men	women
Doubles	men	women
← 2022 ·	NSW Open	· 2024 →

Hsu Yu-hsiou was the defending champion but chose not to defend his title.

Taro Daniel won the title after defeating Marc Polmans 6–2, 6–4 in the final.

== Seeds ==
1. (Australia) Thanasi Kokkinakis (semifinals, retired)
2. (Australia) Rinky Hijikata (semifinals)
3. (Japan) Taro Daniel (champion)
4. (Australia) James Duckworth (withdrew)
5. (Japan) Shintaro Mochizuki (quarterfinals, retired)
6. (Australia) Marc Polmans (final)
7. (South Korea) Hong Seong-chan (first round)
8. (Australia) Tristan Schoolkate (first round)

== Draw ==
=== Key ===
- Q = Qualifier
- WC = Wild card
- LL = Lucky loser
- Alt = Alternate
- SE = Special exempt
- PR = Protected ranking
- ITF = ITF entry
- JE = Junior exempt
- w/o = Walkover
- r = Retired
- d = Defaulted
- SR = Special ranking

=== Finals ===
Semifinals
1	(Australia) Thanasi Kokkinakis	2^{r}
6	(Australia) Marc Polmans	3
3	(Japan) Taro Daniel	3	6	7^{7}
2	(Australia) Rinky Hijikata	6	2	6^{5}

Final
6	(Australia) Marc Polmans	2	4
3	(Japan) Taro Daniel	6	6

=== Top half ===
First round
1	(Australia) T Kokkinakis	6	6
(Poland) F Peliwo	3	1
Q	(New Zealand) A Rai	2	6^{2}
(Australia) P Sekulic	6	7^{7}
Q	(Japan) H Moriya	6	7^{10}
(Japan) N Nakagawa	3	6^{8}
(Japan) R Noguchi	6	6
7	(South Korea) S-c Hong	2	2
LL	(Australia) B Mott	6	6
Q	(New Zealand) R Statham	3	4
Q	(United States) R Seggerman	6	4	6
(Zimbabwe) B Lock	3	6	4
WC	(Australia) Jacob Bradshaw	5	2
(France) A Weber	7	6
(Northern Mariana Islands) C Sinclair	4	2
6	(Australia) M Polmans	6	6

Second round
1	(Australia) T Kokkinakis	7	7
(Australia) P Sekulic	5	5
Q	(Japan) H Moriya	1	2
(Japan) R Noguchi	6	6
LL	(Australia) B Mott	6	6
Q	(United States) R Seggerman	2	3
(France) A Weber	4	4
6	(Australia) M Polmans	6	6

Quarterfinals
1	(Australia) T Kokkinakis	6	7^{7}
(Japan) R Noguchi	3	6^{5}
LL	(Australia) B Mott	3	6	3
6	(Australia) M Polmans	6	3	6

Semifinals
1	(Australia) T Kokkinakis	2^{r}
6	(Australia) M Polmans	3

=== Bottom half ===
First round
5	(Japan) S Mochizuki	6	6
(Australia) O Jasika	4	4
(Japan) Y Shimizu	3	2
(Japan) K Uchida	6	6
(Australia) L Saville	7	6
WC	(Australia) B Ellis	5	2
(Japan) Y Uchiyama	2	1^{r}
3	(Japan) T Daniel	6	2
8	(Australia) T Schoolkate	6^{9}	4
Q	(South Korea) J-s Nam	7^{11}	6
(Australia) D Sweeny	4	6	7^{9}
LL	(Japan) Y Takahashi	6	3	6^{7}
WC	(Australia) Pavle Marinkov	6^{5}	2
SE	(Hong Kong) C Wong	7^{7}	6
Q	(Australia) Matthew Dellavedova	3	4
2	(Australia) R Hijikata	6	6

Second round
5	(Japan) S Mochizuki	7^{12}	7
(Japan) K Uchida	6^{10}	5
(Australia) L Saville	4	2
3	(Japan) T Daniel	6	6
Q	(South Korea) J-s Nam	6	6
(Australia) D Sweeny	4	2
SE	(Hong Kong) C Wong	6	3	2
2	(Australia) R Hijikata	4	6	6

Quarterfinals
5	(Japan) S Mochizuki	1^{r}
3	(Japan) T Daniel	3
Q	(South Korea) J-s Nam	7^{7}	5	6^{5}
2	(Australia) R Hijikata	6^{5}	7	7^{7}

Semifinals
3	(Japan) T Daniel	3	6	7^{7}
2	(Australia) R Hijikata	6	2	6^{5}
