= 2013 Nature's Way Sydney Tennis International – Men's singles =

Men's singles
- 2013 Nature's Way Sydney Tennis International

Final
- Champion: (Australia) Nick Kyrgios
- Runner-up: (Australia) Matt Reid
- Score: 6–3, 6–2

Events
Singles	men	women
Doubles	men	women
Nature's Way Sydney Tennis International	· 2022 →

Nick Kyrgios defeated Matt Reid 6–3, 6–2 in the final to win the title.

== Seeds ==
1. (Japan) Yūichi Sugita (first round)
2. (Australia) John Millman (second round)
3. (Japan) Hiroki Moriya (first round)
4. (Canada) Peter Polansky (second round)
5. (France) Stéphane Robert (semifinals)
6. (Australia) Brydan Klein (first round)
7. (Australia) Samuel Groth (semifinals)
8. (Australia) John-Patrick Smith (first round, retired)

== Draw ==
=== Key ===
- Q = Qualifier
- WC = Wild card
- LL = Lucky loser
- Alt = Alternate
- SE = Special exempt
- PR = Protected ranking
- ITF = ITF entry
- JE = Junior exempt
- w/o = Walkover
- r = Retired
- d = Defaulted
- SR = Special ranking

=== Finals ===
Semifinals
7	(Australia) Samuel Groth	4	5
(Australia) Matt Reid	6	7
WC	(Australia) Nick Kyrgios	7	6
5	(France) Stéphane Robert	5	3

Final
(Australia) Matt Reid	3	2
WC	(Australia) Nick Kyrgios	6	6

=== Top half ===
First round
1	(Japan) Y Sugita	6^{5}	3
(India) S Singh	7^{7}	6
(Australia) J Duckworth	5	6	6
(Italy) A Arnaboldi	7	3	4
(South Korea) S-y Jeong	6	6
(Australia) A Bolt	2	2
(Indonesia) C Rungkat	1	4
7	(Australia) S Groth	6	6
3	(Japan) H Moriya	3	6	1
(Australia) B Mitchell	6	3	6
Q	(New Zealand) A Sitak	3	6	6
(Australia) L Saville	6	3	2
WC	(Australia) J Andrijic	4	7^{7}	3
Q	(New Zealand) M Venus	6	6^{4}	6
(Australia) M Reid	6	0
8	(Australia) J-P Smith	2	0^{r}

Second round
(India) S Singh	2	6^{5}
(Australia) J Duckworth	6	7^{7}
(South Korea) S-y Jeong	1	2
7	(Australia) S Groth	6	6
(Australia) B Mitchell	4	3
Q	(New Zealand) A Sitak	6	6
Q	(New Zealand) M Venus	6^{5}	3
(Australia) M Reid	7^{7}	6

Quarterfinals
(Australia) J Duckworth	6^{2}	6^{5}
7	(Australia) S Groth	7^{7}	7^{7}
Q	(New Zealand) A Sitak	6^{5}	1
(Australia) M Reid	7^{7}	6

Semifinals
7	(Australia) S Groth	4	5
(Australia) M Reid	6	7

=== Bottom half ===
First round
6	(Australia) B Klein	2	4
WC	(Australia) N Kyrgios	6	6
(Australia) D Propoggia	6^{3}	6	2
(Slovakia) I Klec	7^{7}	2	6
Q	(Australia) C Ebelthite	3	4
(Australia) G Jones	6	6
(New Zealand) J Statham	5	1
4	(Canada) P Polansky	7	6
5	(France) S Robert	6	6
WC	(Australia) B Mousley	3	1
WC	(Australia) J Thompson	6^{5}	6	5
Q	(Australia) Nicholas Horton	7^{7}	2	7
(Australia) M Barton	6	1
(Australia) A Feeney	3	0^{r}
(Japan) Y Uchiyama	3	0
2	(Australia) J Millman	6	6

Second round
WC	(Australia) N Kyrgios	6	6
(Slovakia) I Klec	4	3
(Australia) G Jones	6	3	6
4	(Canada) P Polansky	3	6	4
5	(France) S Robert	6	6
Q	(Australia) N Horton	3	1
(Australia) M Barton	6	6
2	(Australia) J Millman	3	3

Quarterfinals
WC	(Australia) N Kyrgios	6	3	6
(Australia) G Jones	4	6	3
5	(France) S Robert	6	6
(Australia) M Barton	3	2

Semifinals
WC	(Australia) N Kyrgios	7	6
5	(France) S Robert	5	3
