= 2022 NSW Open – Women's singles =

Women's singles
- 2022 NSW Open

Final
- Champion: (Japan) Mai Hontama
- Runner-up: (Australia) Petra Hule
- Score: 7–6^{(7–1)}, 3–6, 7–5

Events
Singles	men	women
Doubles	men	women
← 2013 ·	NSW Open	· 2023 →

This was the first edition of the tournament since 2013.

Mai Hontama won the title, defeating Petra Hule in the final, 7–6^{(7–1)}, 3–6, 7–5.

== Seeds ==
1. (Australia) Jaimee Fourlis (withdrew)
2. (Australia) Maddison Inglis (first round, retired)
3. (South Korea) Han Na-lae (quarterfinals)
4. (Australia) Olivia Gadecki (semifinals)
5. (Australia) Kimberly Birrell (semifinals)
6. (Australia) Lizette Cabrera (second round)
7. (Japan) Mai Hontama (champion)
8. (Japan) Himeno Sakatsume (quarterfinals)

== Draw ==
=== Key ===
- Q = Qualifier
- WC = Wild card
- LL = Lucky loser
- Alt = Alternate
- SE = Special exempt
- PR = Protected ranking
- ITF = ITF entry
- JE = Junior exempt
- w/o = Walkover
- r = Retired
- d = Defaulted
- SR = Special ranking

=== Finals ===
Semifinals
7	(Japan) Mai Hontama	4	6	6
4	(Australia) Olivia Gadecki	6	4	2
5	(Australia) Kimberly Birrell	6^{7}	4
WC	(Australia) Petra Hule	7^{9}	6

Final
7	(Japan) Mai Hontama	7^{7}	3	7
WC	(Australia) Petra Hule	6^{1}	6	5

=== Top half ===
First round
LL	(Australia) S Nayar	7^{7}	5	7^{7}
Q	(Germany) S-R Sekulic	6^{4}	7	6^{3}
(Thailand) L Kumkhum	1	3
Q	(Australia) K McPhee	6	6
Q	(United States) M Jones	2	6	7
(Japan) H Arakawa	6	0	5
(United Kingdom) N Bains	2	2
7	(Japan) M Hontama	6	6
4	(Australia) O Gadecki	6	6
(Japan) C Muramatsu	2	0
(Chinese Taipei) Y-h Lee	6	6
Q	(Japan) J Namigata	3	2
(Germany) J Jebawy	3	0
(Australia) A Parnaby	6	6
Q	(Australia) L Mays	7^{7}	4	3
8	(Japan) H Sakatsume	6^{4}	6	6

Second round
LL	(Australia) S Nayar	2	3
Q	(Australia) K McPhee	6	6
Q	(United States) M Jones	3	2
7	(Japan) M Hontama	6	6
4	(Australia) O Gadecki	6	6
(Chinese Taipei) Y-h Lee	3	2
(Australia) A Parnaby	1	3
8	(Japan) H Sakatsume	6	6

Quarterfinals
Q	(Australia) K McPhee	1	0
7	(Japan) M Hontama	6	6
4	(Australia) O Gadecki	6	6
8	(Japan) H Sakatsume	2	4

Semifinals
7	(Japan) M Hontama	4	6	6
4	(Australia) O Gadecki	6	4	2

=== Bottom half ===
First round
5	(Australia) K Birrell	6	6
(India) S Yamalapalli	3	3
(Indonesia) PM Nugroho	2	3
(Australia) A Bozovic	6	6
(United States) J Failla	6	6
(Japan) N Hanatani	1	2
Q	(Ukraine) M Zakarlyuk	2	4
3	(South Korea) N-l Han	6	6
6	(Australia) L Cabrera	6	7
(Australia) D Aiava	2	5
WC	(Australia) P Hule	3	6	6
WC	(Australia) TN Smith	6	2	2
Q	(Slovakia) Z Zlochová	4	6	3
Q	(Japan) M Ozeki	6	2	6
(Australia) T Gibson	7^{9}	3	3
2	(Australia) M Inglis	6^{7}	6	0^{r}

Second round
5	(Australia) K Birrell	6	6
(Australia) A Bozovic	2	4
(United States) J Failla	1	2
3	(South Korea) N-l Han	6	6
6	(Australia) L Cabrera	3	4
WC	(Australia) P Hule	6	6
Q	(Japan) M Ozeki	4	3
(Australia) T Gibson	6	6

Quarterfinals
5	(Australia) K Birrell	6	6
3	(South Korea) N-l Han	4	1
WC	(Australia) P Hule	6	6
(Australia) T Gibson	3	4

Semifinals
5	(Australia) K Birrell	6^{7}	4
WC	(Australia) P Hule	7^{9}	6
