= 2019 Sydney International – Women's doubles =

Women's doubles
- 2019 Sydney International

Final
- Champions: (Serbia) Aleksandra Krunić (Czech Republic) Kateřina Siniaková
- Runners-up: (Japan) Eri Hozumi (Poland) Alicja Rosolska
- Score: 6–1, 7–6^{(7–3)}

Details
- Draw: 16
- Seeds: 4

Events
Singles	men	women
Doubles	men	women
← 2018 ·	Sydney International	· 2022 →

Gabriela Dabrowski and Xu Yifan were the defending champions, but lost in the quarterfinals to Aleksandra Krunić and Kateřina Siniaková.

Krunić and Siniaková went on to win the title, defeating Eri Hozumi and Alicja Rosolska in the final, 6–1, 7–6^{(7–3)}. Siniaková became the sole holder of the WTA no. 1 doubles ranking following the end of the tournament, after previously holding the top ranking jointly with Barbora Krejčíková.

== Seeds ==
1. (Canada) Gabriela Dabrowski / (China) Xu Yifan (quarterfinals)
2. (United States) Nicole Melichar / (Czech Republic) Květa Peschke (first round)
3. (Slovenia) Andreja Klepač / (Spain) María José Martínez Sánchez (semifinals)
4. (Ukraine) Nadiia Kichenok / (Czech Republic) Barbora Strýcová (quarterfinals)

== Draw ==
=== Key ===
- Q = Qualifier
- WC = Wild card
- LL = Lucky loser
- Alt = Alternate
- SE = Special exempt
- PR = Protected ranking
- ITF = ITF entry
- JE = Junior exempt
- w/o = Walkover
- r = Retired
- d = Defaulted
- SR = Special ranking

=== Draw ===
First round
1	(Canada) G Dabrowski (China) Y Xu	6	4	[11]
(United States) R Atawo (Slovenia) K Srebotnik	4	6	[9]
(Switzerland) T Bacsinszky (Croatia) P Martić	2	3
(Serbia) A Krunić (Czech Republic) K Siniaková	6	6
4	(Ukraine) N Kichenok (Czech Republic) B Strýcová	2	6	[10]
(Latvia) J Ostapenko (United States) S Stephens	6	2	[6]
(Japan) M Kato (Japan) M Ninomiya	6	6
(Japan) S Aoyama (Belarus) L Marozava	3	4
(United States) B Mattek-Sands (Netherlands) D Schuurs	6	5	[10]
(Chinese Taipei) S-w Hsieh (United States) A Spears	2	7	[7]
WC	(Australia) P Hon (Australia) A Tomljanović	5	6	[8]
3	(Slovenia) A Klepač (Spain) MJ Martínez Sánchez	7	3	[10]
(Georgia (country)) O Kalashnikova (Germany) T Maria	5	3
(Japan) E Hozumi (Poland) A Rosolska	7	6
(Germany) A-L Grönefeld (United States) V King	6^{3}	6	[10]
2	(United States) N Melichar (Czech Republic) K Peschke	7^{7}	3	[7]

Quarterfinals
1	(Canada) G Dabrowski (China) Y Xu	2	4
(Serbia) A Krunić (Czech Republic) K Siniaková	6	6
4	(Ukraine) N Kichenok (Czech Republic) B Strýcová	6	3	[8]
(Japan) M Kato (Japan) M Ninomiya	1	6	[10]
(United States) B Mattek-Sands (Netherlands) D Schuurs	6	1	[8]
3	(Slovenia) A Klepač (Spain) MJ Martínez Sánchez	2	6	[10]
(Japan) E Hozumi (Poland) A Rosolska	6	2	[10]
(Germany) A-L Grönefeld (United States) V King	3	6	[8]

Semifinals
(Serbia) A Krunić (Czech Republic) K Siniaková	7	6
(Japan) M Kato (Japan) M Ninomiya	5	2
3	(Slovenia) A Klepač (Spain) MJ Martínez Sánchez	6	2	[8]
(Japan) E Hozumi (Poland) A Rosolska	4	6	[10]

Final
(Serbia) A Krunić (Czech Republic) K Siniaková	6	7^{7}
(Japan) E Hozumi (Poland) A Rosolska	1	6^{3}
