= 2022 NSW Open – Women's doubles =

Women's doubles
- 2022 NSW Open

Final
- Champions: (Australia) Destanee Aiava (Australia) Lisa Mays
- Runners-up: (Australia) Alexandra Osborne (Indonesia) Jessy Rompies
- Score: 5–7, 6–3, [10–6]

Events
Singles	men	women
Doubles	men	women
← 2013 ·	NSW Open	· 2023 →

Destanee Aiava and Lisa Mays won the title after defeating Alexandra Osborne and Jessy Rompies 5–7, 6–3, [10–6] in the final.

This was the first edition of the tournament since 2013.

== Seeds ==
1. (South Korea) Han Na-lae / (Indonesia) Priska Madelyn Nugroho (first round)
2. (Australia) Alexandra Osborne / (Indonesia) Jessy Rompies (final)
3. (Australia) Kimberly Birrell / (Australia) Maddison Inglis (quarterfinals, withdrew)
4. (Japan) Haruna Arakawa / (Japan) Natsuho Arakawa (first round)

== Draw ==
=== Key ===
- Q = Qualifier
- WC = Wild card
- LL = Lucky loser
- Alt = Alternate
- SE = Special exempt
- PR = Protected ranking
- ITF = ITF entry
- JE = Junior exempt
- w/o = Walkover
- r = Retired
- d = Defaulted
- SR = Special ranking

=== Draw ===
First round
1	(South Korea) N-l Han (Indonesia) PM Nugroho	4	4
(Australia) P Hule (United States) M Jones	6	6
(Australia) R McBryde (India) S Yamalapalli	2	1
(Thailand) A Chanta (Thailand) L Kumkhum	6	6
4	(Japan) H Arakawa (Japan) N Arakawa	0	4
(Australia) K McPhee (Australia) A Parnaby	6	6
(Australia) D Aiava (Australia) L Mays	6	7
(Germany) J Jebawy (Germany) S-R Sekulic	0	5
(New Zealand) M Barry (New Zealand) V Yang	2	2
(Australia) A Bozovic (Australia) T Gibson	6	6
(Australia) R Bains (Australia) Z Brankovic	2	2
3	(Australia) K Birrell (Australia) M Inglis	6	6
(Japan) M Hontama (Japan) J Namigata	6	6
(Australia) M Krish (Australia) B Thompson	2	4
(United States) J Failla (Slovakia) Z Zlochová	6	5	[6]
2	(Australia) A Osborne (Indonesia) J Rompies	0	7	[10]

Quarterfinals
(Australia) P Hule (United States) M Jones	0	6	[10]
(Thailand) A Chanta (Thailand) L Kumkhum	6	0	[6]
(Australia) K McPhee (Australia) A Parnaby	3	7^{7}	[7]
(Australia) D Aiava (Australia) L Mays	6	6^{4}	[10]
(Australia) A Bozovic (Australia) T Gibson	w/o
3	(Australia) K Birrell (Australia) M Inglis
(Japan) M Hontama (Japan) J Namigata	7^{7}	6^{5}	[2]
2	(Australia) A Osborne (Indonesia) J Rompies	6^{2}	7^{7}	[10]

Semifinals
(Australia) P Hule (United States) M Jones
(Australia) D Aiava (Australia) L Mays	w/o
(Australia) A Bozovic (Australia) T Gibson	3	6	[7]
2	(Australia) A Osborne (Indonesia) J Rompies	6	1	[10]

Final
(Australia) D Aiava (Australia) L Mays	5	6	[10]
2	(Australia) A Osborne (Indonesia) J Rompies	7	3	[6]
