= 2023 NSW Open =

- Date: 30 October–5 November
- Edition: 3rd (men); 9th (women)
- Category: ATP Challenger Tour; ITF Women's World Tennis Tour
- Surface: Hard / Outdoor
- Location: Sydney, Australia

Champions

Men's singles
- (Japan) Taro Daniel

Women's singles
- (Australia) Destanee Aiava

Men's doubles
- (United States) Ryan Seggerman / (United States) Patrik Trhac

Women's doubles
- (Australia) Destanee Aiava / (Australia) Maddison Inglis
← 2022 ·	NSW Open	· 2024 →

The 2023 NSW Open was a professional tennis tournament played on outdoor hard courts. It was the third edition of the tournament which was part of the 2023 ATP Challenger Tour and the ninth edition of the tournament which was part of the 2023 ITF Women's World Tennis Tour. It took place in Sydney, Australia between 30 October and 5 November 2023.

== Champions ==
=== Men's singles ===
- (Japan) Taro Daniel def. (Australia) Marc Polmans 6–2, 6–4.

=== Women's singles ===
- (Australia) Destanee Aiava def. (Australia) Astra Sharma, 6–3 6–4

=== Men's doubles ===
- (United States) Ryan Seggerman / (United States) Patrik Trhac def. (Philippines) Ruben Gonzales / (South Korea) Nam Ji-sung 6–4, 6–4.

=== Women's doubles ===
- (Australia) Destanee Aiava / (Australia) Maddison Inglis def. (Japan) Kyōka Okamura / (Japan) Ayano Shimizu, 6–0, 6–0

== Men's singles main draw entrants ==
=== Seeds ===
Country	Player	Rank^{1}	Seed
AUS	Thanasi Kokkinakis	68	1
AUS	Rinky Hijikata	70	2
JPN	Taro Daniel	100	3
~~AUS~~	~~James Duckworth~~	~~125~~	~~4~~
JPN	Shintaro Mochizuki	131	5
AUS	Marc Polmans	160	6
KOR	Hong Seong-chan	223	7
AUS	Tristan Schoolkate	248	8

- ^{1} Rankings are as of 23 October 2023.

=== Other entrants ===
The following players received wildcards into the singles main draw:

- (Australia) Jacob Bradshaw
- (Australia) Blake Ellis
- (Australia) Pavle Marinkov

The following player received entry into the singles main draw as a special exempt:

- (Hong Kong) Coleman Wong

The following players received entry from the qualifying draw:

- (Australia) Matthew Dellavedova
- (Japan) Hiroki Moriya
- (South Korea) Nam Ji-sung
- (New Zealand) Ajeet Rai
- (United States) Ryan Seggerman
- (New Zealand) Rubin Statham

The following players received entry as lucky losers:

- (Australia) Blake Mott
- (Japan) Yusuke Takahashi

== Women's singles main draw entrants ==
=== Seeds ===
Country	Player	Rank^{1}	Seed
KOR	Jang Su-jeong	152	1
AUS	Astra Sharma	161	2
JPN	Moyuka Uchijima	182	3
AUS	Priscilla Hon	202	4
AUS	Jaimee Fourlis	212	5
AUS	Destanee Aiava	218	6
CHN	Ma Yexin	220	7
THA	Lanlana Tararudee	233	8

- ^{1} Rankings are as of 23 October 2023.

=== Other entrants ===
The following players received wildcards into the singles main draw:

- (Australia) Gabriella Da Silva-Fick
- (Australia) Maya Joint
- (Australia) Alana Parnaby
- (Australia) Ivana Popovic

The following player received entry using a junior exempt:

- (United States) Lea Ma

The following players received entry from the qualifying draw:

- (Japan) Shiho Akita
- (Japan) Haruna Arakawa
- (Czech Republic) Michaela Bayerlová
- (Japan) Yui Chikaraishi
- (United States) Mia Horvit
- (Japan) Eri Hozumi
- (Japan) Chihiro Muramatsu
- (Japan) Hikaru Sato
