= 2022 Sydney Tennis Classic – Men's doubles =

Men's doubles
- 2022 Sydney Tennis Classic

Final
- Champions: (Australia) John Peers (Slovakia) Filip Polášek
- Runners-up: (Italy) Simone Bolelli (Italy) Fabio Fognini
- Score: 7–5, 7–5

Events
Singles	men	women
Doubles	men	women
- Sydney International

This is a page for the men's doubles Sydney classic.

John Peers and Filip Polášek defeated Simone Bolelli and Fabio Fognini in the final, 7–5, 7–5, to win the men's doubles in tennis title at the 2022 Sydney Tennis Classic.

Jamie Murray and Bruno Soares were the defending champions from when the tournament was last held in 2019, but they lost to Bolelli and Fognini in the second round.

== Seeds ==
All seeds received a bye into the second round.

1. (Croatia) Nikola Mektić / (Croatia) Mate Pavić (withdrew)
2. (Colombia) Juan Sebastián Cabal / (Colombia) Robert Farah (quarterfinals)
3. (Australia) John Peers / (Slovakia) Filip Polášek (champions)
4. (Germany) Tim Pütz / (New Zealand) Michael Venus (second round)
5. (United Kingdom) Jamie Murray / (Brazil) Bruno Soares (second round)
6. (Germany) Kevin Krawietz / (Germany) Andreas Mies (semifinals)
7. (El Salvador) Marcelo Arévalo / (Netherlands) Jean-Julien Rojer (second round)
8. (Kazakhstan) Andrey Golubev / (Croatia) Franko Škugor (second round)

== Draw ==
Key

- Q = Qualifier
- WC = Wild card
- LL = Lucky loser
- Alt = Alternate
- ITF = ITF entry
- PR = Protected ranking
- SR = Special ranking
- SE = Special exempt
- JE = Junior exempt
- JR = Junior Accelerator Programme entrant
- CO = College Accelerator Programme entrant
- NG = Next Gen Accelerator Program entrant
- w/o = Walkover
- r = Retired
- d = Defaulted

=== Finals ===
Semifinals
6	(Germany) Kevin Krawietz (Germany) Andreas Mies	4	2
(Italy) Simone Bolelli (Italy) Fabio Fognini	6	6
3	(Australia) John Peers (Slovakia) Filip Polášek	7^{7}	6
(Australia) Alexei Popyrin (Australia) Matt Reid	6^{2}	3

Final
(Italy) Simone Bolelli (Italy) Fabio Fognini	5	5
3	(Australia) John Peers (Slovakia) Filip Polášek	7	7

=== Top half ===
First round
(Argentina) F Bagnis (Mexico) H Hach Verdugo	2	6	[10]
(United States) N Lammons (United States) J Withrow	6	3	[8]
(United States) H Reese (Netherlands) S Verbeek	6	3	[4]
(Netherlands) M Middelkoop (Austria) P Oswald	3	6	[10]
PR	(Germany) D Altmaier (Italy) A Seppi	2	4
(France) F Martin (United Kingdom) J O'Mara	6	6
WC	(Australia) M Bouzige (Australia) M Romios	1	7	[3]
(Italy) S Bolelli (Italy) F Fognini	6	5	[10]

Second round
1	(Croatia) N Mektić (Croatia) M Pavić
(Argentina) F Bagnis (Mexico) H Hach Verdugo	w/o
(Netherlands) M Middelkoop (Austria) P Oswald	7^{7}	4	[5]
6	(Germany) K Krawietz (Germany) A Mies	6^{2}	6	[10]
4	(Germany) T Pütz (New Zealand) M Venus	4	6	[6]
(France) F Martin (United Kingdom) J O'Mara	6	1	[10]
(Italy) S Bolelli (Italy) F Fognini	7^{7}	4	[10]
5	(United Kingdom) J Murray (Brazil) B Soares	6^{3}	6	[6]

Quarterfinals
(Argentina) F Bagnis (Mexico) H Hach Verdugo	4	3
6	(Germany) K Krawietz (Germany) A Mies	6	6
(France) F Martin (United Kingdom) J O'Mara	5	5
(Italy) S Bolelli (Italy) F Fognini	7	7

Semifinals
6	(Germany) K Krawietz (Germany) A Mies	4	2
(Italy) S Bolelli (Italy) F Fognini	6	6

=== Bottom half ===
First round
(United Kingdom) L Glasspool (Finland) H Heliövaara	7^{7}	3	[7]
(Kazakhstan) A Nedovyesov (Pakistan) A-u-H Qureshi	6^{2}	6	[10]
WC	(Australia) N Kyrgios (Greece) M Pervolarakis
(New Zealand) M Daniell (United States) D Kudla	w/o
(Australia) A Popyrin (Australia) M Reid	6	6
(Spain) P Andújar (Spain) P Martínez	2	2
(Ukraine) D Molchanov (Belarus) A Vasilevski	6	6^{2}	[8]
(Czech Republic) J Veselý (Poland) S Walków	4	7^{7}	[10]

Second round
7	(El Salvador) M Arévalo (Netherlands) J-J Rojer	6^{5}	4
(Kazakhstan) A Nedovyesov (Pakistan) A-u-H Qureshi	7^{7}	6
(New Zealand) M Daniell (United States) D Kudla
3	(Australia) J Peers (Slovakia) F Polášek	w/o
8	(Kazakhstan) A Golubev (Croatia) F Škugor	3	1
(Australia) A Popyrin (Australia) M Reid	6	6
(Czech Republic) J Veselý (Poland) S Walków	4	5
2	(Colombia) JS Cabal (Colombia) R Farah	6	7

Quarterfinals
(Kazakhstan) A Nedovyesov (Pakistan) A-u-H Qureshi	6	3	[12]
3	(Australia) J Peers (Slovakia) F Polášek	3	6	[14]
(Australia) A Popyrin (Australia) M Reid	7^{7}	3	[10]
2	(Colombia) JS Cabal (Colombia) R Farah	6^{4}	6	[7]

Semifinals
3	(Australia) J Peers (Slovakia) F Polášek	7^{7}	6
(Australia) A Popyrin (Australia) M Reid	6^{2}	3
