= 2023 NSW Open – Women's singles =

Women's singles
- 2023 NSW Open

Final
- Champion: (Australia) Destanee Aiava
- Runner-up: (Australia) Astra Sharma
- Score: 6–3 6–4

Events
Singles	men	women
Doubles	men	women
← 2022 ·	NSW Open	· 2024 →

Mai Hontama was the defending champion but chose not to participate.

Destanee Aiava won the title, defeating Astra Sharma in the final, 6–3 6–4.

== Seeds ==
1. (South Korea) Jang Su-jeong (quarterfinals)
2. (Australia) Astra Sharma (final)
3. (Japan) Moyuka Uchijima (quarterfinals)
4. (Australia) Priscilla Hon (first round)
5. (Australia) Jaimee Fourlis (quarterfinals)
6. (Australia) Destanee Aiava (champion)
7. (China) Ma Yexin (first round)
8. (Thailand) Lanlana Tararudee (first round)

== Draw ==
=== Key ===
- Q = Qualifier
- WC = Wild card
- LL = Lucky loser
- Alt = Alternate
- SE = Special exempt
- PR = Protected ranking
- ITF = ITF entry
- JE = Junior exempt
- w/o = Walkover
- r = Retired
- d = Defaulted
- SR = Special ranking

=== Finals ===
Semifinals
6	(Australia) Destanee Aiava	6^{5}	6	6
WC	(Australia) Maya Joint	7^{7}	2	4
Q	(Japan) Hikaru Sato	6	2	1
2	(Australia) Astra Sharma	4	6	6

Final
6	(Australia) Destanee Aiava	6	6
2	(Australia) Astra Sharma	3	4

=== Top half ===
First round
1	(South Korea) S-j Jang	6	6
(Australia) T Gibson	4	2
(Australia) T Preston	6	7
WC	(Australia) I Popovic	3	5
Q	(Japan) S Akita	6	4	6^{3}
Q	(Japan) E Hozumi	3	6	7^{7}
WC	(Australia) A Parnaby	4	3
6	(Australia) D Aiava	6	6
4	(Australia) P Hon	3	1
WC	(Australia) M Joint	6	6
(Japan) Y Naito	7	7
(Japan) N Kawaguchi	5	5
Q	(United States) M Horvit	6	1	1
Q	(Japan) C Muramatsu	4	6	6
(Australia) P Hule	3	4
5	(Australia) J Fourlis	6	6

Second round
1	(South Korea) S-j Jang	6	6
(Australia) T Preston	1	3
Q	(Japan) E Hozumi	2	5
6	(Australia) D Aiava	6	7
WC	(Australia) M Joint	6	6
(Japan) Y Naito	4	3
Q	(Japan) C Muramatsu	6	1	4
5	(Australia) J Fourlis	2	6	6

Quarterfinals
1	(South Korea) S-j Jang	3	7^{7}	6^{7}
6	(Australia) D Aiava	6	6^{5}	7^{9}
WC	(Australia) M Joint	6	6
5	(Australia) J Fourlis	2	3

Semifinals
6	(Australia) D Aiava	6^{5}	6	6
WC	(Australia) M Joint	7^{7}	2	4

=== Bottom half ===
First round
8	(Thailand) L Tararudee	3	1
WC	(Australia) G Da Silva-Fick	6	6
Q	(Japan) Y Chikaraishi	2	2
Q	(Japan) H Sato	6	6
(Australia) K McPhee	7	6
(Japan) S Hosogi	5	1
Q	(Czech Republic) M Bayerlová	0	4
3	(Japan) M Uchijima	6	6
7	(China) Y Ma	4	7	4
(Japan) K Okamura	6	5	6
(Chinese Taipei) J Garland	6	6
Q	(Japan) H Arakawa	1	1
JE	(United States) L Ma	6	3	6
(Japan) A Shimizu	0	6	2
(Australia) M Inglis	2	5
2	(Australia) A Sharma	6	7

Second round
WC	(Australia) G Da Silva-Fick	3	4
Q	(Japan) H Sato	6	6
(Australia) K McPhee	6^{4}	3
3	(Japan) M Uchijima	7^{7}	6
(Japan) K Okamura	7	3	6
(Chinese Taipei) J Garland	5	6	1
JE	(United States) L Ma	7^{7}	4	3
2	(Australia) A Sharma	6^{1}	6	6

Quarterfinals
Q	(Japan) H Sato	6	6
3	(Japan) M Uchijima	3	2
(Japan) K Okamura	6	3	1
2	(Australia) A Sharma	4	6	6

Semifinals
Q	(Japan) H Sato	6	2	1
2	(Australia) A Sharma	4	6	6
