= 2013 Nature's Way Sydney Tennis International – Women's singles =

Women's singles
- 2013 Nature's Way Sydney Tennis International

Final
- Champion: (China) Wang Yafan
- Runner-up: (Japan) Misa Eguchi
- Score: 6–2, 6–0

Events
Singles	men	women
Doubles	men	women
Nature's Way Sydney Tennis International	· 2022 →

This was a new event in 2013. Wang Yafan won the inaugural title, defeating Misa Eguchi in the final, 6–2, 6–0.

== Seeds ==
1. (Japan) Misa Eguchi (final)
2. (Japan) Miyabi Inoue (quarterfinals)
3. (Japan) Mari Tanaka (first round)
4. (Australia) Jessica Moore (first round)
5. (Australia) Azra Hadzic (semifinals)
6. (Japan) Eri Hozumi (quarterfinals)
7. (China) Wang Yafan (champion)
8. (Japan) Chiaki Okadaue (quarterfinals)

== Main draw ==
=== Key ===
- Q = Qualifier
- WC = Wild card
- LL = Lucky loser
- Alt = Alternate
- SE = Special exempt
- PR = Protected ranking
- ITF = ITF entry
- JE = Junior exempt
- w/o = Walkover
- r = Retired
- d = Defaulted
- SR = Special ranking

=== Finals ===
Semifinals
1	(Japan) Misa Eguchi	6	4	6
(China) Zhu Lin	0	6	3
5	(Australia) Azra Hadzic	1	3
7	(China) Wang Yafan	6	6

Final
1	(Japan) Misa Eguchi	2	0
7	(China) Wang Yafan	6	6

=== Top half ===
First round
1	(Japan) M Eguchi	6	6
Q	(Australia) A Keir	3	4
(Australia) A Myers	6^{3}	6	7
(United Kingdom) N Slater	7^{7}	3	5
(Serbia) T Čurović	6	7^{7}
(Australia) I Holland	4	6^{4}
WC	(Australia) R Tredoux	4	1
8	(Japan) C Okadaue	6	6
3	(Japan) M Tanaka	3	7	2
(Japan) M Imanishi	6	5	6
(China) Z Yang	1	7^{7}	3
(China) L Zhu	6	6^{2}	6
(Australia) S Bengson	6	3	7^{7}
(Australia) A Svinos	3	6	6^{2}
(Australia) N Baric	2	2
6	(Japan) E Hozumi	6	6

Second round
1	(Japan) M Eguchi	6	6
(Australia) A Myers	1	1
(Serbia) T Čurović	2	6	3
8	(Japan) C Okadaue	6	4	6
(Japan) M Imanishi
(China) L Zhu	w/o
(Australia) S Bengson	4	6	2
6	(Japan) E Hozumi	6	3	6

Quarterfinals
1	(Japan) M Eguchi	6	6
8	(Japan) C Okadaue	1	4
(China) L Zhu	3	6	6
6	(Japan) E Hozumi	6	4	1

Semifinals
1	(Japan) M Eguchi	6	4	6
(China) L Zhu	0	6	3

=== Bottom half ===
First round
5	(Australia) A Hadzic	6	6
(Japan) K Onishi	2	4
Q	(Japan) M Ozeki	6	7
Q	(Australia) S Stojic	4	5
WC	(Australia) B Woolcock	6^{6}	7	6
WC	(Australia) D Wagland	7^{8}	5	0
(Australia) A Bai	6	6
4	(Australia) J Moore	3	2
7	(China) Y Wang	4	6	6
WC	(Australia) N Hoynaski	6	1	4
Q	(Russia) Y Mogilnitskaya	5	6	1
Q	(Japan) H Kaji	7	3	6
Q	(Australia) T Calderwood	6	6
Q	(Japan) Y Sakai	2	3
Q	(Australia) A Sumner	4	1
2	(Japan) M Inoue	6	6

Second round
5	(Australia) A Hadzic	6	6
Q	(Japan) M Ozeki	3	2
WC	(Australia) B Woolcock	6	4	1
(Australia) A Bai	4	6	6
7	(China) Y Wang	6	6
Q	(Japan) H Kaji	1	2
Q	(Australia) T Calderwood	0	7^{7}	3
2	(Japan) M Inoue	6	6^{3}	6

Quarterfinals
5	(Australia) A Hadzic	6	6
(Australia) A Bai	0	1
7	(China) Y Wang	6	6
2	(Japan) M Inoue	2	2

Semifinals
5	(Australia) A Hadzic	1	3
7	(China) Y Wang	6	6
