= 2019 Sydney International – Men's doubles =

Men's doubles
- 2019 Sydney International

Final
- Champions: (United Kingdom) Jamie Murray (Brazil) Bruno Soares
- Runners-up: (Colombia) Juan Sebastián Cabal (Colombia) Robert Farah
- Score: 6–4, 6–3

Events
Singles	men	women
Doubles	men	women
← 2018 ·	Sydney International	· 2022 →

Łukasz Kubot and Marcelo Melo were the defending champions, but Melo could not participate due to injury and Kubot chose to compete in Auckland instead.

Jamie Murray and Bruno Soares won the title, defeating Juan Sebastián Cabal and Robert Farah in the final, 6–4, 6–3.

== Seeds ==
1. (Colombia) Juan Sebastián Cabal / (Colombia) Robert Farah (final)
2. (United Kingdom) Jamie Murray / (Brazil) Bruno Soares (champions)
3. (Croatia) Nikola Mektić / (Austria) Alexander Peya (first round)
4. (United States) Rajeev Ram / (United Kingdom) Joe Salisbury (first round)

== Draw ==
=== Key ===
- Q = Qualifier
- WC = Wild card
- LL = Lucky loser
- Alt = Alternate
- SE = Special exempt
- PR = Protected ranking
- ITF = ITF entry
- JE = Junior exempt
- w/o = Walkover
- r = Retired
- d = Defaulted
- SR = Special ranking

=== Draw ===
First round
1	(Colombia) JS Cabal (Colombia) R Farah	7^{7}	6
(Czech Republic) R Jebavý (Argentina) A Molteni	6^{5}	4
(Australia) M Ebden (Sweden) R Lindstedt	7^{7}	7^{7}
Alt	(United Kingdom) L Bambridge (United Kingdom) J O'Mara	6^{2}	6^{1}
4	(United States) R Ram (United Kingdom) J Salisbury	1	3
WC	(Australia) L Hewitt (Australia) J Thompson	6	6
(Tunisia) M Jaziri (Spain) M López
(Slovakia) M Kližan (United States) N Monroe	w/o
WC	(Australia) A Bolt (Australia) M Reid	6	7^{8}
(Serbia) D Lajović (Italy) A Seppi	3	6^{6}
(United Kingdom) K Skupski (United Kingdom) N Skupski	6	6
3	(Croatia) N Mektić (Austria) A Peya	3	4
(Croatia) I Dodig (France) É Roger-Vasselin	6	6
(India) R Bopanna (India) D Sharan	2	4
(Mexico) S González (Pakistan) A-u-H Qureshi	4	4
2	(United Kingdom) J Murray (Brazil) B Soares	6	6

Quarterfinals
1	(Colombia) JS Cabal (Colombia) R Farah	6	7^{7}
(Australia) M Ebden (Sweden) R Lindstedt	3	6^{1}
WC	(Australia) L Hewitt (Australia) J Thompson	6	7^{7}
(Slovakia) M Kližan (United States) N Monroe	4	6^{4}
WC	(Australia) A Bolt (Australia) M Reid	4	6^{4}
(United Kingdom) K Skupski (United Kingdom) N Skupski	6	7^{7}
(Croatia) I Dodig (France) É Roger-Vasselin	5	3
2	(United Kingdom) J Murray (Brazil) B Soares	7	6

Semifinals
1	(Colombia) JS Cabal (Colombia) R Farah	7^{9}	7
WC	(Australia) L Hewitt (Australia) J Thompson	6^{7}	5
(United Kingdom) K Skupski (United Kingdom) N Skupski	6^{4}	7	[7]
2	(United Kingdom) J Murray (Brazil) B Soares	7^{7}	5	[10]

Final
1	(Colombia) JS Cabal (Colombia) R Farah	4	3
2	(United Kingdom) J Murray (Brazil) B Soares	6	6
