= 2023 NSW Open – Men's doubles =

Men's doubles
- 2023 NSW Open

Final
- Champions: (United States) Ryan Seggerman (United States) Patrik Trhac
- Runners-up: (Philippines) Ruben Gonzales (South Korea) Nam Ji-sung
- Score: 6–4, 6–4

Events
Singles	men	women
Doubles	men	women
- NSW Open

Blake Ellis and Tristan Schoolkate were the defending champions but only Ellis chose to defend his title, partnering Colin Sinclair. Ellis lost in the quarterfinals to Matthew Romios and Dane Sweeny.

Ryan Seggerman and Patrik Trhac won the title after defeating Ruben Gonzales and Nam Ji-sung 6–4, 6–4 in the final.

== Seeds ==
1. (Poland) Piotr Matuszewski / (Germany) Kai Wehnelt (quarterfinals)
2. (Australia) Rinky Hijikata / (United States) Mac Kiger (first round)
3. (Philippines) Ruben Gonzales / (South Korea) Nam Ji-sung (final)
4. (Zimbabwe) Benjamin Lock / (New Zealand) Rubin Statham (first round)

== Draw ==
Key

- Q = Qualifier
- WC = Wild card
- LL = Lucky loser
- Alt = Alternate
- ITF = ITF entry
- PR = Protected ranking
- SR = Special ranking
- SE = Special exempt
- JE = Junior exempt
- JR = Junior Accelerator Programme entrant
- CO = College Accelerator Programme entrant
- NG = Next Gen Accelerator Program entrant
- w/o = Walkover
- r = Retired
- d = Defaulted

First round
1	(Poland) P Matuszewski (Germany) K Wehnelt	4	6	[10]
(Australia) M Bouzige (Australia) B Mott	6	4	[2]
(Australia) B Bayldon (Australia) K Pearson	2	7	[10]
(Australia) J Delaney (Australia) L Saville	6	5	[8]
3	(Philippines) R Gonzales (South Korea) J-s Nam	6	6
(Japan) S Mochizuki (Japan) R Noguchi	3	4
(Australia) C Puttergill (New Zealand) A Rai	6	6
(Australia) O Jasika (Japan) H Moriya	3	3
(Australia) J Beale (Australia) T Fancutt	3	2
(Australia) MC Romios (Australia) D Sweeny	6	6
(Australia) B Ellis (Northern Mariana Islands) C Sinclair	7^{7}	6
4	(Zimbabwe) B Lock (New Zealand) R Statham	6^{3}	2
(Poland) F Peliwo (France) A Weber	3	0
(Japan) Makoto Ochi (Japan) Y Shimizu	6	6
(United States) R Seggerman (United States) P Trhac	6	6
2	(Australia) R Hijikata (United States) M Kiger	4	4

Quarterfinals
1	(Poland) P Matuszewski (Germany) K Wehnelt	6^{1}	6	[6]
(Australia) B Bayldon (Australia) K Pearson	7^{7}	2	[10]
3	(Philippines) R Gonzales (South Korea) J-s Nam	6	7
(Australia) C Puttergill (New Zealand) A Rai	2	5
(Australia) MC Romios (Australia) D Sweeny	6	7^{9}
(Australia) B Ellis (Northern Mariana Islands) C Sinclair	4	6^{7}
(Japan) M Ochi (Japan) Y Shimizu	4	6^{0}
(United States) R Seggerman (United States) P Trhac	6	7^{7}

Semifinals
(Australia) B Bayldon (Australia) K Pearson	6^{6}	6	[8]
3	(Philippines) R Gonzales (South Korea) J-s Nam	7^{8}	3	[10]
(Australia) MC Romios (Australia) D Sweeny	2	2
(United States) R Seggerman (United States) P Trhac	6	6

Final
3	(Philippines) R Gonzales (South Korea) J-s Nam	4	4
(United States) R Seggerman (United States) P Trhac	6	6
