= 2019 Sydney International – Men's singles =

Men's singles
- 2019 Sydney International

Final
- Champion: (Australia) Alex de Minaur
- Runner-up: (Italy) Andreas Seppi
- Score: 7–5, 7–6^{(7–5)}

Details
- Draw: 28 (4 Q / 3 WC )
- Seeds: 8

Events
| Singles | men | women |
| Doubles | men | women |
| ← 2018 · | Sydney International | · 2022 → |

Daniil Medvedev was the defending champion, but withdrew before his first match.

Alex de Minaur won his first ATP Tour title, defeating Andreas Seppi in the final, 7–5, 7–6^{(7–5)}.

== Seeds ==
The top four seeds receive a bye into the second round.

1. (Greece) Stefanos Tsitsipas (quarterfinals)
2. (Russia) Daniil Medvedev (withdrew due to right shoulder injury)
3. (Argentina) Diego Schwartzman (semifinals)
4. (France) Gilles Simon (semifinals)
5. (Australia) Alex de Minaur (champion)
6. (France) Lucas Pouille (first round)
7. (Hungary) Márton Fucsovics (second round)
8. (Italy) Andreas Seppi (final)

== Draw ==
=== Finals ===
Semifinals
8 | (Italy) Andreas Seppi | 7^{7} | 6
3 | (Argentina) Diego Schwartzman | 6^{3} | 4
4 | (France) Gilles Simon | 3 | 2
5 | (Australia) Alex de Minaur | 6 | 6

Final
8 | (Italy) Andreas Seppi | 5 | 6^{5}
5 | (Australia) Alex de Minaur | 7 | 7^{7}

=== Top half ===
First round
(Australia) M Ebden | 6 | 3 | 4
LL | (Argentina) G Andreozzi | 3 | 6 | 6
(Slovakia) M Kližan | 7^{7} | 4 | 7^{7}
WC | (Australia) A Popyrin | 6^{4} | 6 | 6^{5}
(France) J Chardy | 5 | 6 | 4
8 | (Italy) A Seppi | 7 | 2 | 6
(United States) D Kudla | 5 | 4
Q | (Spain) G García López | 7 | 6
(United States) R Harrison | 4 | 2
Q | (Japan) Y Nishioka | 6 | 6
Q | (Russia) A Rublev | 6 | 6
6 | (France) L Pouille | 2 | 3

Second round
1 | (Greece) S Tsitsipas | 6 | 6
LL | (Argentina) G Andreozzi | 3 | 4
(Slovakia) M Kližan | 6^{2} | 2
8 | (Italy) A Seppi | 7^{7} | 6
3 | (Argentina) D Schwartzman | 6 | 6
Q | (Spain) G García López | 2 | 3
Q | (Japan) Y Nishioka | 6 | 6
Q | (Russia) A Rublev | 3 | 1

Quarterfinals
1 | (Greece) S Tsitsipas | 6 | 4 | 4
8 | (Italy) A Seppi | 4 | 6 | 6
3 | (Argentina) D Schwartzman | 6 | 3 | 7^{7}
Q | (Japan) Y Nishioka | 1 | 6 | 6^{1}

Semifinals
8 | (Italy) A Seppi | 7^{7} | 6
3 | (Argentina) D Schwartzman | 6^{3} | 4

=== Bottom half ===
First round
7 | (Hungary) M Fucsovics | 3 | 6 | 6
WC | (Australia) J Duckworth | 6 | 3 | 4
(Australia) J Millman | 4 | 7^{7} | 7
(United States) F Tiafoe | 6 | 6^{5} | 5
(Tunisia) M Jaziri | 1 | 1^{r}
(United States) S Querrey | 6 | 4
5 | (Australia) A de Minaur | 6 | 6
(Serbia) D Lajović | 4 | 3
Q | (United States) R Opelka | 6 | 6
(Spain) A Ramos Viñolas | 3 | 4
WC | (Australia) J Thompson | 6 | 6
(France) A Mannarino | 3 | 3

Second round
7 | (Hungary) M Fucsovics | 3 | 4
(Australia) J Millman | 6 | 6
(United States) S Querrey | 6^{5} | 7^{8} | 4
4 | (France) G Simon | 7^{7} | 6^{6} | 6
5 | (Australia) A de Minaur | 6 | 7^{7}
Q | (United States) R Opelka | 4 | 6^{5}
WC | (Australia) J Thompson | 3 | 7^{7} | 6
LL | (Japan) T Daniel | 6 | 6^{5} | 0

Quarterfinals
(Australia) J Millman | 5 | 6 | 6^{3}
4 | (France) G Simon | 7 | 3 | 7^{7}
5 | (Australia) A de Minaur | 7^{7} | 6
WC | (Australia) J Thompson | 6^{4} | 3

Semifinals
4 | (France) G Simon | 3 | 2
5 | (Australia) A de Minaur | 6 | 6

== Qualifying ==
=== Seeds ===
1. (Slovenia) Aljaž Bedene (first round)
2. (Russia) Andrey Rublev (qualified)
3. (Japan) Yoshihito Nishioka (qualified)
4. (Japan) Taro Daniel (qualifying competition, lucky loser)
5. (Argentina) Guido Andreozzi (qualifying competition, lucky loser)
6. (Spain) Jaume Munar (first round)
7. (Spain) Pablo Andújar (first round)
8. (Chile) Cristian Garín (qualifying competition)

=== Qualifiers ===
1. (Spain) Guillermo García López
2. (Russia) Andrey Rublev
3. (Japan) Yoshihito Nishioka
4. (United States) Reilly Opelka

=== Lucky losers ===
1. (Argentina) Guido Andreozzi
2. (Japan) Taro Daniel

=== Qualifying draw ===
==== First qualifier ====
First round
1 | (Slovenia) Aljaž Bedene | 7 | 4 | 6^{4}
(Spain) Guillermo García López | 5 | 6 | 7^{7}
WC | (Australia) Alex Bolt | 3 | 7 | 6
6 | (Spain) Jaume Munar | 6 | 5 | 3

Qualifying competition
(Spain) Guillermo García López | 7^{7} | 6
WC | (Australia) Alex Bolt | 6^{3} | 3

==== Second qualifier ====
First round
2 | (Russia) Andrey Rublev | 6 | 6
(Russia) Evgeny Donskoy | 1 | 4
WC | (Australia) Christopher O'Connell | 6 | 4 | 3
5 | (Argentina) Guido Andreozzi | 4 | 6 | 6

Qualifying competition
2 | (Russia) Andrey Rublev | 7 | 6
5 | (Argentina) Guido Andreozzi | 5 | 2

==== Third qualifier ====
First round
3 | (Japan) Yoshihito Nishioka | 5 | 6 | 6
(Australia) Jason Kubler | 7 | 1 | 3
(Portugal) Pedro Sousa | 3 | 3
8 | (Chile) Cristian Garín | 6 | 6

Qualifying competition
3 | (Japan) Yoshihito Nishioka | 6 | 7
8 | (Chile) Cristian Garín | 3 | 5

==== Fourth qualifier ====
First round
4 | (Japan) Taro Daniel | 6 | 7
(Czech Republic) Lukáš Rosol | 4 | 5
(United States) Reilly Opelka | 6 | 7
7 | (Spain) Pablo Andújar | 1 | 5

Qualifying competition
4 | (Japan) Taro Daniel | 7^{7} | 4 | 4
(United States) Reilly Opelka | 6^{5} | 6 | 6
