= 2019 Sydney International =

- Date: 6–12 January 2019
- Edition: 127th
- Category: ATP Tour 250 series / WTA Premier
- Draw: 28S / 16D (ATP); 30S / 16D (WTA)
- Surface: Hard
- Location: Sydney, Australia
- Venue: NSW Tennis Centre

Champions

Men's singles
- (Australia) Alex de Minaur

Women's singles
- (Czech Republic) Petra Kvitová

Men's doubles
- (United Kingdom) Jamie Murray / (Brazil) Bruno Soares

Women's doubles
- (Serbia) Aleksandra Krunić / (Czech Republic) Kateřina Siniaková
- Sydney International

The 2019 Sydney International was a tournament on the 2019 ATP Tour and 2019 WTA Tour. It was played on outdoor hard courts in Sydney, New South Wales, Australia.

It was the 127th edition of the tournament and took place at the NSW Tennis Centre. It was held from 6 to 12 January 2019 as part of the Australian Open Series in preparation for the first Grand Slam of the year.

== Points and prize money ==
=== Point distribution ===
Event	W	F	SF	QF	Round of 16	Round of 32	Q	Q2	Q1
Men's singles	250	150	90	45	20	0	12	6	0
Men's doubles	250	150	90	45	0	—N/a	—N/a	—N/a	—N/a
Women's singles	470	305	185	100	55	1	25	13	1
Women's doubles	470	305	185	100	1	—N/a	—N/a	—N/a	—N/a

=== Prize money ===
Event	W	F	SF	QF	Round of 16	Round of 32^{1}	Q2	Q1
Men's singles	$90,990	$49,205	$27,175	$15,435	$8,880	$5,320	$2,575	$1,285
Men's doubles *	$29,860	$15,300	$8,290	$4,740	$2,780	—N/a	—N/a	—N/a
Women's singles	$141,875	$75,570	$40,322	$21,660	$11,620	$6,345	$3,500	$1,828
Women's doubles *	$44,200	$23,615	$12,905	$6,565	$3,570	—N/a	—N/a	—N/a

_{^{1}Qualifiers prize money is also the Round of 32 prize money.}
_{*per team}

== ATP singles main-draw entrants ==
=== Seeds ===
Country	Player	Rank^{1}	Seed
GRE	Stefanos Tsitsipas	15	1
~~RUS~~	~~Daniil Medvedev~~	~~16~~	~~2~~
ARG	Diego Schwartzman	17	3
FRA	Gilles Simon	30	4
AUS	Alex de Minaur	31	5
FRA	Lucas Pouille	32	6
HUN	Márton Fucsovics	36	7
ITA	Andreas Seppi	37	8

- ^{1} Rankings are as of 31 December 2018.

=== Other entrants ===
The following players received wildcards into the singles main draw:

- (Australia) James Duckworth
- (Australia) Alexei Popyrin
- (Australia) Jordan Thompson

The following players received entry from the qualifying draw:

- (Spain) Guillermo García López
- (Japan) Yoshihito Nishioka
- (United States) Reilly Opelka
- (Russia) Andrey Rublev

The following players received entry as lucky losers:

- (Argentina) Guido Andreozzi
- (Japan) Taro Daniel

=== Withdrawals ===
Before the tournament

- (United Kingdom) Kyle Edmund → replaced by (United States) Sam Querrey
- (Chile) Nicolás Jarry → replaced by (Argentina) Guido Andreozzi
- (Russia) Daniil Medvedev → replaced by (Japan) Taro Daniel
- (France) Jo-Wilfried Tsonga → replaced by (United States) Denis Kudla

=== Retirements ===
- (Tunisia) Malek Jaziri

== ATP doubles main-draw entrants ==
=== Seeds ===
Country	Player	Country	Player	Rank^{1}	Seed
COL	Juan Sebastián Cabal	COL	Robert Farah	10	1
GBR	Jamie Murray	BRA	Bruno Soares	14	2
CRO	Nikola Mektić	AUT	Alexander Peya	30	3
USA	Rajeev Ram	GBR	Joe Salisbury	51	4

- ^{1} Rankings are as of 31 December 2018.

=== Other entrants ===
The following pairs received wildcards into the doubles main draw:

- (Australia) Alex Bolt / (Australia) Matt Reid
- (Australia) Lleyton Hewitt / (Australia) Jordan Thompson

The following pair received entry as alternates:

- (United Kingdom) Luke Bambridge / (United Kingdom) Jonny O'Mara

=== Withdrawals ===
Before the tournament

- (Chile) Nicolás Jarry
- (Tunisia) Malek Jaziri

== WTA singles main-draw entrants ==
=== Seeds ===
Country	Player	Rank^{1}	Seed
ROU	Simona Halep	1	1
GER	Angelique Kerber	2	2
~~JPN~~	~~Naomi Osaka~~	~~5~~	~~3~~
USA	Sloane Stephens	6	4
CZE	Petra Kvitová	7	5
~~CZE~~	~~Karolína Plíšková~~	~~8~~	~~6~~
NED	Kiki Bertens	9	7
RUS	Daria Kasatkina	10	8
LAT	Anastasija Sevastova	11	9
BEL	Elise Mertens	12	10

- ^{1} Rankings are as of 31 December 2018.

=== Other entrants ===
The following players received wildcards into the singles main draw:

- (Australia) Daria Gavrilova
- (Czech Republic) Petra Kvitová
- (Australia) Samantha Stosur
- (Australia) Ajla Tomljanović

The following player received entry using a protected ranking into the singles main draw:

- (Switzerland) Timea Bacsinszky

The following players received entry from the qualifying draw:

- (Russia) Ekaterina Alexandrova
- (United States) Danielle Collins
- (Australia) Priscilla Hon
- (Kazakhstan) Yulia Putintseva
- (Belarus) Aliaksandra Sasnovich
- (Czech Republic) Kateřina Siniaková

The following players received entry as lucky losers:

- ~~(United Kingdom) Johanna Konta~~
- (Germany) Tatjana Maria
- (United States) Bernarda Pera
- (Puerto Rico) Monica Puig

=== Withdrawals ===
Before the tournament

- (Japan) Naomi Osaka → replaced by (Puerto Rico) Monica Puig
- (Czech Republic) Karolína Plíšková → replaced by (Germany) Tatjana Maria
- (Ukraine) Lesia Tsurenko → replaced by (United States) Bernarda Pera

During the tournament

- (Spain) Garbiñe Muguruza (GI Illness)

== WTA doubles main-draw entrants ==
=== Seeds ===
Country	Player	Country	Player	Rank^{1}	Seed
CAN	Gabriela Dabrowski	CHN	Xu Yifan	22	1
USA	Nicole Melichar	CZE	Květa Peschke	28	2
SLO	Andreja Klepač	ESP	María José Martínez Sánchez	34	3
UKR	Nadiia Kichenok	CZE	Barbora Strýcová	42	4

- ^{1} Rankings are as of 31 December 2018.

=== Other entrants ===
The following pair received a wildcard into the doubles main draw:

- (Australia) Priscilla Hon / (Australia) Ajla Tomljanović

== Champions ==
=== Men's singles ===
- (Australia) Alex de Minaur def. (Italy) Andreas Seppi, 7–5, 7–6^{(7–5)}

=== Women's singles ===
- (Czech Republic) Petra Kvitová def. (Australia) Ashleigh Barty 1–6, 7–5, 7–6^{(7–6)}

=== Men's doubles ===
- (United Kingdom) Jamie Murray / (Brazil) Bruno Soares def. (Colombia) Juan Sebastián Cabal / (Colombia) Robert Farah, 6–4, 6–3

=== Women's doubles ===
- (Serbia) Aleksandra Krunić / (Czech Republic) Kateřina Siniaková def. (Japan) Eri Hozumi / (Poland) Alicja Rosolska, 6–1, 7–6^{(7–3)}
