= 2013 Nature's Way Sydney Tennis International – Women's doubles =

Women's doubles
- 2013 Nature's Way Sydney Tennis International

Final
- Champions: (Japan) Misa Eguchi (Japan) Mari Tanaka
- Runners-up: (Serbia) Tamara Čurović (China) Wang Yafan
- Score: 4–6, 7–5, [10–8]

Events
Singles	men	women
Doubles	men	women
Nature's Way Sydney Tennis International	· 2022 →

This was a new event in 2013. Misa Eguchi and Mari Tanaka won the inaugural title, defeating Tamara Čurović and Wang Yafan in the final, 4–6, 7–5, [10–8].

== Seeds ==
1. (Australia) Stephanie Bengson / (Australia) Jessica Moore (quarterfinals)
2. (Japan) Misa Eguchi / (Japan) Mari Tanaka (champions)
3. (Australia) Alison Bai / (Australia) Tyra Calderwood (quarterfinals)
4. (Australia) Abbie Myers / (United Kingdom) Nicola Slater (semifinals)

== Draw ==
=== Key ===
- Q = Qualifier
- WC = Wild card
- LL = Lucky loser
- Alt = Alternate
- SE = Special exempt
- PR = Protected ranking
- ITF = ITF entry
- JE = Junior exempt
- w/o = Walkover
- r = Retired
- d = Defaulted
- SR = Special ranking

First round
1	(Australia) S Bengson (Australia) J Moore	6	6
WC	(Australia) P Boyanov (Australia) A Dokic	3	1
(Serbia) T Čurović (China) Y Wang	6	6
(Australia) N Collie (Australia) L Daw	1	2
3	(Australia) A Bai (Australia) T Calderwood	6	6
WC	(Australia) A Svinos (Australia) D Wagland	2	1
(Australia) S Harris (Australia) A Sharma	3	1
(Japan) C Okadaue (Japan) K Onishi	6	6
(China) Z Yang (China) L Zhu	3	4
(Australia) I Holland (Australia) B Woolcock	6	6
(Australia) A Sumner (Australia) R Tredoux	6	4	[4]
4	(Australia) A Myers (United Kingdom) N Slater	2	6	[10]
WC	(Australia) G Ruhrig (Australia) S Stojic	2	6	[9]
(Australia) N Baric (Australia) J Karaitiana	6	4	[11]
(Australia) N Hoynaski (Australia) D Mladin	6	5	[10]
2	(Japan) M Eguchi (Japan) M Tanaka	1	7	[12]

Quarterfinals
1	(Australia) S Bengson (Australia) J Moore	7^{9}	1	[6]
(Serbia) T Čurović (China) Y Wang	6^{7}	6	[10]
3	(Australia) A Bai (Australia) T Calderwood	4	5
(Japan) C Okadaue (Japan) K Onishi	6	7
(Australia) I Holland (Australia) B Woolcock	6	2	[4]
4	(Australia) A Myers (United Kingdom) N Slater	3	6	[10]
(Australia) N Baric (Australia) J Karaitiana	1	1
2	(Japan) M Eguchi (Japan) M Tanaka	6	6

Semifinals
(Serbia) T Čurović (China) Y Wang	6	2	[10]
(Japan) C Okadaue (Japan) K Onishi	3	6	[6]
4	(Australia) A Myers (United Kingdom) N Slater	4	0
2	(Japan) M Eguchi (Japan) M Tanaka	6	6

Final
(Serbia) T Čurović (China) Y Wang	6	5	[8]
2	(Japan) M Eguchi (Japan) M Tanaka	4	7	[10]
