= 2022 Sydney Tennis Classic – Men's singles =

Men's singles
- 2022 Sydney Tennis Classic

Final
- Champion: (Russia) Aslan Karatsev
- Runner-up: (United Kingdom) Andy Murray
- Score: 6–3, 6–3

Details
- Draw: 28 (4 Q / 3 WC )
- Seeds: 8

Events
Singles	men	women
Doubles	men	women
← 2019 ·	Sydney International	· 2023 →

Aslan Karatsev defeated Andy Murray in the final, 6–3, 6–3 to win the men's singles title at the 2022 Sydney Tennis Classic. This was Murray's first ATP final since he won the 2019 European Open.

Alex de Minaur was the defending champion from when the event was held in 2019, but withdrew before the tournament began.

== Seeds ==
The top four seeds receive a bye into the second round.

1. (Russia) Aslan Karatsev (champion)
2. (Georgia (country)) Nikoloz Basilashvili (second round)
3. (United Kingdom) Dan Evans (semifinals)
4. (United States) Reilly Opelka (semifinals)
5. (Italy) Lorenzo Sonego (quarterfinals)
6. (Serbia) Dušan Lajović (second round)
7. (Italy) Fabio Fognini (second round)
8. (Belgium) David Goffin (quarterfinals, retired)

== Draw ==
=== Key ===
- Q = Qualifier
- WC = Wild card
- LL = Lucky loser
- Alt = Alternate
- SE = Special exempt
- PR = Protected ranking
- ITF = ITF entry
- JE = Junior exempt
- w/o = Walkover
- r = Retired
- d = Defaulted
- SR = Special ranking

=== Finals ===
Semifinals
1	(Russia) Aslan Karatsev	6	6^{13}	6
3	(United Kingdom) Dan Evans	3	7^{15}	3
4	(United States) Reilly Opelka	7^{8}	4	4
WC	(United Kingdom) Andy Murray	6^{6}	6	6

Final
1	(Russia) Aslan Karatsev	6	6
WC	(United Kingdom) Andy Murray	3	3

=== Top half ===
First round
(Serbia) M Kecmanović	6	6
LL	(Italy) S Travaglia	2	3
Q	(Australia) C O'Connell	2	6	6^{4}
Q	(Argentina) S Báez	6	1	7^{7}
(France) H Gaston	6	3	5
5	(Italy) L Sonego	3	6	7
(Australia) A Popyrin	4	4
(Spain) P Martínez	6	6
SE	(United States) M Cressy	6	7
(France) A Mannarino	3	5
(Spain) A Davidovich Fokina	6^{5}	4
6	(Serbia) D Lajović	7^{7}	6

Second round
1	(Russia) A Karatsev	7	6
(Serbia) M Kecmanović	5	4
Q	(Argentina) S Báez	2	3
5	(Italy) L Sonego	6	6
3	(United Kingdom) D Evans	6	6
(Spain) P Martínez	2	3
SE	(United States) M Cressy	6	6
6	(Serbia) D Lajović	3	4

Quarterfinals
1	(Russia) A Karatsev	6	3	6
5	(Italy) L Sonego	2	6	2
3	(United Kingdom) D Evans	6	7^{7}
SE	(United States) M Cressy	4	6^{5}

Semifinals
1	(Russia) A Karatsev	6	6^{13}	6
3	(United Kingdom) D Evans	3	7^{15}	3

=== Bottom half ===
First round
7	(Italy) F Fognini	6	7
LL	(Germany) D Altmaier	3	5
Q	(Czech Republic) J Veselý	6^{2}	6^{0}
(United States) B Nakashima	7^{7}	7^{7}
WC	(Australia) J Thompson	6	6
(United States) M Giron	4	2
8	(Belgium) D Goffin	6	6
(Argentina) F Bagnis	4	4
(Argentina) F Delbonis	3	1
LL	(United States) D Kudla	6	6
Q	(Norway) V Durasovic	3	1
WC	(United Kingdom) A Murray	6	6

Second round
7	(Italy) F Fognini	6^{7}	6^{6}
(United States) B Nakashima	7^{9}	7^{8}
WC	(Australia) J Thompson	3	2
4	(United States) R Opelka	6	6
8	(Belgium) D Goffin	6	6
LL	(United States) D Kudla	2	3
WC	(United Kingdom) A Murray	6^{4}	7^{7}	6
2	(Georgia (country)) N Basilashvili	7^{7}	6^{3}	3

Quarterfinals
(United States) B Nakashima	6^{4}	2
4	(United States) R Opelka	7^{7}	6
8	(Belgium) D Goffin	2	0^{r}
WC	(United Kingdom) A Murray	6	0

Semifinals
4	(United States) R Opelka	7^{8}	4	4
WC	(United Kingdom) A Murray	6^{6}	6	6

== Qualifying ==
=== Seeds ===
1. (Argentina) Facundo Bagnis (moved to main draw)
2. (Italy) Stefano Travaglia (qualifying competition, lucky loser)
3. (Czech Republic) Jiří Veselý (qualified)
4. (Germany) Daniel Altmaier (qualifying competition, lucky loser)
5. (Spain) Pablo Andújar (first round)
6. (Argentina) Sebastián Báez (qualified)
7. (Italy) Andreas Seppi (first round)
8. (United States) Denis Kudla (qualifying competition, lucky loser)

=== Qualifiers ===
1. (Norway) Viktor Durasovic
2. (Australia) Christopher O'Connell
3. (Czech Republic) Jiří Veselý
4. (Argentina) Sebastián Báez

=== Lucky losers ===
1. (Italy) Stefano Travaglia
2. (Germany) Daniel Altmaier
3. (United States) Denis Kudla

=== Qualifying draw ===
==== First qualifier ====
First round
Alt	(Finland) Harri Heliövaara	7^{7}	7^{13}
PR	(New Zealand) Rubin Statham	6^{5}	6^{11}
Alt	(Norway) Viktor Durasovic	7^{7}	3	6
5	(Spain) Pablo Andújar	6^{3}	6	3

Qualifying competition
Alt	(Finland) Harri Heliövaara	4	6	4
Alt	(Norway) Viktor Durasovic	6	3	6

==== Second qualifier ====
First round
2	(Italy) Stefano Travaglia	7	6
WC	(Australia) Matthew Romios	5	1
(Australia) Christopher O'Connell	6	6
7	(Italy) Andreas Seppi	4	3

Qualifying competition
2	(Italy) Stefano Travaglia	3	4
(Australia) Christopher O'Connell	6	6

==== Third qualifier ====
First round
3	(Czech Republic) Jiří Veselý	6	6
(France) Lucas Pouille	4	4
(United States) Stefan Kozlov	6	6^{7}	3
8	(United States) Denis Kudla	4	7^{9}	6

Qualifying competition
3	(Czech Republic) Jiří Veselý	6	7^{7}
8	(United States) Denis Kudla	4	6^{3}

==== Fourth qualifier ====
First round
4	(Germany) Daniel Altmaier	6	6
Alt	(Greece) Michail Pervolarakis	4	1
WC	(Australia) Moerani Bouzige	3	5
6	(Argentina) Sebastián Báez	6	7

Qualifying competition
4	(Germany) Daniel Altmaier	6^{4}	5
6	(Argentina) Sebastián Báez	7^{7}	7
