= 2022 NSW Open – Men's doubles =

Men's doubles
- 2022 NSW Open

Final
- Champions: (Australia) Blake Ellis (Australia) Tristan Schoolkate
- Runners-up: (New Zealand) Ajeet Rai (Japan) Yuta Shimizu
- Score: 4–6, 7–5, [11–9]

Events
Singles	men	women
Doubles	men	women
- NSW Open

Blake Ellis and Tristan Schoolkate won the title after defeating Ajeet Rai and Yuta Shimizu 4–6, 7–5, [11–9] in the final.

This was the first edition of the tournament since 2013.

== Seeds ==
1. (Czech Republic) Marek Gengel / (Chinese Taipei) Hsu Yu-hsiou (first round)
2. (Australia) Marc Polmans / (Australia) Max Purcell (quarterfinals)
3. (Australia) Luke Saville / (Australia) Jordan Thompson (withdrew)
4. (Australia) Matthew Romios / (Australia) Jason Taylor (semifinals)

== Draw ==
Key

- Q = Qualifier
- WC = Wild card
- LL = Lucky loser
- Alt = Alternate
- ITF = ITF entry
- PR = Protected ranking
- SR = Special ranking
- SE = Special exempt
- JE = Junior exempt
- JR = Junior Accelerator Programme entrant
- CO = College Accelerator Programme entrant
- NG = Next Gen Accelerator Program entrant
- w/o = Walkover
- r = Retired
- d = Defaulted

First round
1	(Czech Republic) M Gengel (Chinese Taipei) Y-h Hsu	3	6	[3]
(Australia) O Jasika (Australia) J McCabe	6	2	[10]
(United Kingdom) M Whitehouse (Australia) E Winter	4	6	[10]
(Australia) A Addison (Australia) C Puttergill	6	4	[3]
Alt	(Australia) B Bayldon (Australia) Jordan Smith	7	6^{10}	[6]
PR	(Australia) D Kelly (New Zealand) R Statham	5	7^{12}	[10]
(India) P Gunneswaran (India) M Sasikumar	4	0
(New Zealand) A Rai (Japan) Y Shimizu	6	6
(Australia) A Bolt (Australia) R Hijikata	6	6
(United States) Kyle Seelig (Northern Mariana Islands) C Sinclair	2	2
(Australia) J Beale (Australia) A Taylor	6^{0}	6	[8]
4	(Australia) M Romios (Australia) J Taylor	7^{7}	4	[10]
(Australia) B Ellis (Australia) T Schoolkate	6	7
WC	(Australia) Ethan Cook (Australia) Zaharije-Zak Talic	3	5
WC	(Australia) M Hulme (Australia) K Pearson	0	3
2	(Australia) M Polmans (Australia) M Purcell	6	6

Quarterfinals
(Australia) O Jasika (Australia) J McCabe	2	3
(United Kingdom) M Whitehouse (Australia) E Winter	6	6
PR	(Australia) D Kelly (New Zealand) R Statham	5	3
(New Zealand) A Rai (Japan) Y Shimizu	7	6
(Australia) A Bolt (Australia) R Hijikata	7	6^{4}	[5]
4	(Australia) M Romios (Australia) J Taylor	5	7^{7}	[10]
(Australia) B Ellis (Australia) T Schoolkate	7	6
2	(Australia) M Polmans (Australia) M Purcell	5	3

Semifinals
(United Kingdom) M Whitehouse (Australia) E Winter	2	4
(New Zealand) A Rai (Japan) Y Shimizu	6	6
4	(Australia) M Romios (Australia) J Taylor	3	6^{3}
(Australia) B Ellis (Australia) T Schoolkate	6	7^{7}

Final
(New Zealand) A Rai (Japan) Y Shimizu	6	5	[9]
(Australia) B Ellis (Australia) T Schoolkate	4	7	[11]
