= 2019 Sydney International – Women's singles =

Women's singles
- 2019 Sydney International

Final
- Champion: (Czech Republic) Petra Kvitová
- Runner-up: (Australia) Ashleigh Barty
- Score: 1–6, 7–5, 7–6^{(7–3)}

Details
- Draw: 30 (4 Q / 4 WC )
- Seeds: 8

Events
| Singles | men | women |
| Doubles | men | women |
- Sydney International

Angelique Kerber was the defending champion, but lost to Petra Kvitová in the quarterfinals.

Kvitová went on to win her second title in Sydney, defeating the previous year's finalist Ashleigh Barty in the final, 1–6, 7–5, 7–6^{(7–3)}.

== Seeds ==
The top two seeds receive a bye into the second round.

1. (Romania) Simona Halep (second round)
2. (Germany) Angelique Kerber (quarterfinals)
3. (Japan) Naomi Osaka (withdrew)
4. (United States) Sloane Stephens (second round)
5. (Czech Republic) Petra Kvitová (champion)
6. (Czech Republic) Karolína Plíšková (withdrew)
7. (Netherlands) Kiki Bertens (semifinals)
8. (Russia) Daria Kasatkina (first round)
9. (Latvia) Anastasija Sevastova (first round)
10. (Belgium) Elise Mertens (quarterfinals)

== Draw ==
=== Finals ===
Semifinals
(Australia) Ashleigh Barty | 6^{4} | 6 | 7
7 | (Netherlands) Kiki Bertens | 7^{7} | 4 | 5
Q | (Belarus) Aliaksandra Sasnovich | 1 | 2
5/WC | (Czech Republic) Petra Kvitová | 6 | 6

Final
(Australia) Ashleigh Barty | 6 | 5 | 6^{3}
5/WC | (Czech Republic) Petra Kvitová | 1 | 7 | 7^{7}

=== Top half ===
First round
(Latvia) J Ostapenko | 3 | 3
(Australia) A Barty | 6 | 6
(Estonia) A Kontaveit | 2 | 7 | 6
LL | (Puerto Rico) M Puig | 6 | 5 | 1
Q | (Czech Republic) K Siniaková | 6^{4} | 6 | 2
10 | (Belgium) E Mertens | 7^{7} | 2 | 6
4 | (United States) S Stephens | 0 | 7^{7} | 7^{7}
Q | (Russia) E Alexandrova | 6 | 6^{3} | 6^{3}
Q | (Kazakhstan) Y Putintseva | 6 | 7^{7}
WC | (Australia) D Gavrilova | 1 | 6^{4}
(Spain) C Suárez Navarro | 3 | 4
(Spain) G Muguruza | 6 | 6
LL | (United States) B Pera | 5 | 4
7 | (Netherlands) K Bertens | 7 | 6

Second round
1 | (Romania) S Halep | 4 | 4
(Australia) A Barty | 6 | 6
(Estonia) A Kontaveit | 3 | 1
10 | (Belgium) E Mertens | 6 | 6
4 | (United States) S Stephens | 6 | 6^{4} | 0
Q | (Kazakhstan) Y Putintseva | 3 | 7^{7} | 6
(Spain) G Muguruza
7 | (Netherlands) K Bertens | w/o

Quarterfinals
(Australia) A Barty | 6 | 6
10 | (Belgium) E Mertens | 3 | 3
Q | (Kazakhstan) Y Putintseva | 2 | 2
7 | (Netherlands) K Bertens | 6 | 6

Semifinals
(Australia) A Barty | 6^{4} | 6 | 7
7 | (Netherlands) K Bertens | 7^{7} | 4 | 5

=== Bottom half ===
First round
8 | (Russia) D Kasatkina | 1 | 4
Q | (Belarus) A Sasnovich | 6 | 6
LL | (Germany) T Maria | 3 | 6^{4}
Q | (Australia) P Hon | 6 | 7^{7}
(Slovakia) D Cibulková | 6 | 3 | 4
WC | (Australia) S Stosur | 3 | 6 | 6
PR | (Switzerland) T Bacsinszky | 6^{3} | 6 | 6
9 | (Latvia) A Sevastova | 7^{7} | 4 | 4
5/WC | (Czech Republic) P Kvitová | 6 | 7
(Belarus) A Sabalenka | 1 | 5
(Chinese Taipei) S-w Hsieh | 7^{7} | 6
Q | (United States) D Collins | 6^{4} | 3
WC | (Australia) A Tomljanović | 3 | 3
(Italy) C Giorgi | 6 | 6

Second round
Q | (Belarus) A Sasnovich | 0 | 6 | 6
Q | (Australia) P Hon | 6 | 3 | 3
WC | (Australia) S Stosur | 7 | 4 | 3
PR | (Switzerland) T Bacsinszky | 5 | 6 | 6
5/WC | (Czech Republic) P Kvitová | 7^{7} | 6
(Chinese Taipei) S-w Hsieh | 6^{2} | 2
(Italy) C Giorgi | 6^{3} | 2
2 | (Germany) A Kerber | 7^{7} | 6

Quarterfinals
Q | (Belarus) A Sasnovich | 6 | 6
PR | (Switzerland) T Bacsinszky | 3 | 3
5/WC | (Czech Republic) P Kvitová | 6 | 6
2 | (Germany) A Kerber | 4 | 1

Semifinals
Q | (Belarus) A Sasnovich | 1 | 2
5/WC | (Czech Republic) P Kvitová | 6 | 6

== Qualifying ==
=== Seeds ===
1. (Belarus) Aliaksandra Sasnovich (qualified)
2. (Czech Republic) Kateřina Siniaková (qualified)
3. (Czech Republic) Barbora Strýcová (first round)
4. (United States) Danielle Collins (qualified)
5. (United Kingdom) Johanna Konta (qualifying competition, retired, ~~Lucky loser~~)
6. (France) Kristina Mladenovic (first round)
7. (Kazakhstan) Yulia Putintseva (qualified)
8. (Puerto Rico) Monica Puig (qualifying competition, lucky loser)
9. (Serbia) Aleksandra Krunić (first round)
10. (United States) Bernarda Pera (qualifying competition, lucky loser)
11. (Germany) Tatjana Maria (qualifying competition, lucky loser)
12. (Russia) Ekaterina Alexandrova (qualified)

=== Qualifiers ===
1. (Belarus) Aliaksandra Sasnovich
2. (Czech Republic) Kateřina Siniaková
3. (Kazakhstan) Yulia Putintseva
4. (United States) Danielle Collins
5. (Russia) Ekaterina Alexandrova
6. (Australia) Priscilla Hon

=== Lucky losers ===
1. (Puerto Rico) Monica Puig
2. (Germany) Tatjana Maria
3. (United Kingdom) ~~Johanna Konta~~
4. (United States) Bernarda Pera

=== Qualifying draw ===
==== First qualifier ====
First round
1 | (Belarus) Aliaksandra Sasnovich | 6 | 6
(Slovenia) Tamara Zidanšek | 4 | 1
Alt | (United States) Bethanie Mattek-Sands | 6 | 2 | 2
8 | (Puerto Rico) Monica Puig | 3 | 6 | 6

Qualifying competition
1 | (Belarus) Aliaksandra Sasnovich | 6 | 6
8 | (Puerto Rico) Monica Puig | 1 | 0

==== Second qualifier ====
First round
2 | (Czech Republic) Kateřina Siniaková | 6 | 6
(Japan) Eri Hozumi | 2 | 3
WC | (Australia) Alexandra Bozovic | 2 | 1
10 | (United States) Bernarda Pera | 6 | 6

Qualifying competition
2 | (Czech Republic) Kateřina Siniaková | 6 | 6
10 | (United States) Bernarda Pera | 3 | 4

==== Third qualifier ====
First round
3 | (Czech Republic) Barbora Strýcová | 5 | 6 | 4
(Kazakhstan) Zarina Diyas | 7 | 1 | 6
(Australia) Destanee Aiava | 0 | 2
7 | (Kazakhstan) Yulia Putintseva | 6 | 6

Qualifying competition
(Kazakhstan) Zarina Diyas | 2 | 2
7 | (Kazakhstan) Yulia Putintseva | 6 | 6

==== Fourth qualifier ====
First round
4 | (United States) Danielle Collins | 7^{7} | 6
WC | (Australia) Maddison Inglis | 6^{3} | 4
WC | (Australia) Abbie Myers | 1 | 3
11 | (Germany) Tatjana Maria | 6 | 6

Qualifying competition
4 | (United States) Danielle Collins | 7 | 6
11 | (Germany) Tatjana Maria | 5 | 3

==== Fifth qualifier ====
First round
5 | (United Kingdom) Johanna Konta | 6 | 6
(Czech Republic) Miriam Kolodziejová | 3 | 2
(Switzerland) Stefanie Vögele | 4 | 1
12 | (Russia) Ekaterina Alexandrova | 6 | 6

Qualifying competition
5 | (United Kingdom) Johanna Konta | 1^{r}
12 | (Russia) Ekaterina Alexandrova | 4

==== Sixth qualifier ====
First round
6 | (France) Kristina Mladenovic | 6^{5} | 6 | 6^{8}
WC | (Australia) Kimberly Birrell | 7^{7} | 3 | 7^{10}
(Australia) Priscilla Hon | 6 | 6
9 | (Serbia) Aleksandra Krunić | 1 | 4

Qualifying competition
WC | (Australia) Kimberly Birrell | 7^{7} | 4 | 3
(Australia) Priscilla Hon | 6^{2} | 6 | 6
