= 2013 Nature's Way Sydney Tennis International =

- Date: 25 February – 3 March
- Edition: 1st
- Draw: 32S / 16D
- Prize money: $50,000 (men) $10,000 (women)
- Surface: Hard
- Location: Sydney, Australia

Champions

Men's singles
- (Australia) Nick Kyrgios

Women's singles
- (China) Wang Yafan

Men's doubles
- (Australia) Brydan Klein / (Australia) Dane Propoggia

Women's doubles
- (Japan) Misa Eguchi / (Japan) Mari Tanaka
- Nature's Way Sydney Tennis International

The 2013 Nature's Way Sydney Tennis International was a professional tennis tournament played on hard courts. It was the first edition of the tournament which was part of the 2013 ATP Challenger Tour and the 2013 ITF Women's Circuit. It took place in Sydney, Australia, between 25 February and 3 March 2013.

== ATP singles main-draw entrants ==
=== Seeds ===
Country	Player	Rank^{1}	Seed
JPN	Yūichi Sugita	138	1
AUS	John Millman	167	2
JPN	Hiroki Moriya	175	3
CAN	Peter Polansky	181	4
FRA	Stéphane Robert	208	5
AUS	Brydan Klein	224	6
AUS	Samuel Groth	230	7
AUS	John-Patrick Smith	237	8

- ^{1} Rankings as of 18 February 2013

=== Other entrants ===
The following players received wildcards into the singles main draw:

- (Australia) Jay Andrijic
- (Australia) Nick Kyrgios
- (Australia) Jordan Thompson
- (Australia) Bradley Mousley

The following players received entry from the qualifying draw:

- (Australia) Colin Ebelthite
- (Australia) Nicholas Horton
- (New Zealand) Artem Sitak
- (New Zealand) Michael Venus

== ATP doubles main-draw entrants ==
=== Seeds ===
Country	Player	Country	Player	Rank^{1}	Seed
AUS	Brydan Klein	AUS	Dane Propoggia	242	1
AUS	Samuel Groth	AUS	John-Patrick Smith	250	2
IND	Purav Raja	IND	Divij Sharan	284	3
AUS	Chris Guccione	AUS	Matt Reid	377	4

- ^{1} Rankings as of 24 December 2013

=== Other entrants ===
The following pairs received wildcards into the doubles main draw:

- (Australia) Jay Andrijic / (Australia) Sadik Kadir
- (Australia) Jacob Grills / (Australia) Bradley Mousley
- (Australia) Jack Schipanski / (Australia) Jordan Thompson

The following pairs received entry as alternates:

- (Australia) Ryan Agar / (Austria) Sebastian Bader

== Champions ==
=== Men's singles ===
- (Australia) Nick Kyrgios def. (Australia) Matt Reid 6–3, 6–2

=== Men's doubles ===
- (Australia) Brydan Klein / (Australia) Dane Propoggia def. (Australia) Alex Bolt / (Australia) Nick Kyrgios 6–4, 4–6, [11–9]

=== Women's singles ===
- (China) Wang Yafan def. (Japan) Misa Eguchi 6–2, 6–0

=== Women's doubles ===
- (Japan) Misa Eguchi / (Japan) Mari Tanaka def. (Serbia) Tamara Čurović / (China) Wang Yafan 4–6, 7–5, [10–8]
