= 2022 NSW Open – Men's singles =

Men's singles
- 2022 NSW Open

Final
- Champion: (Chinese Taipei) Hsu Yu-hsiou
- Runner-up: (Australia) Marc Polmans
- Score: 6–4, 7–6^{(7–5)}

Events
Singles	men	women
Doubles	men	women
- NSW Open

This was the first edition of the tournament since 2013.

Hsu Yu-hsiou won the title after defeating Marc Polmans 6–4, 7–6^{(7–5)} in the final.

== Seeds ==
1. (Australia) Jordan Thompson (withdrew)
2. (Australia) James Duckworth (first round)
3. (Australia) Aleksandar Vukic (second round)
4. (Australia) Li Tu (first round)
5. (Australia) Rinky Hijikata (first round)
6. (Australia) Dane Sweeny (first round)
7. (Japan) Rio Noguchi (second round)
8. (Australia) Max Purcell (semifinals)

== Draw ==
Key

- Q = Qualifier
- WC = Wild card
- LL = Lucky loser
- Alt = Alternate
- ITF = ITF entry
- PR = Protected ranking
- SR = Special ranking
- SE = Special exempt
- JE = Junior exempt
- JR = Junior Accelerator Programme entrant
- CO = College Accelerator Programme entrant
- NG = Next Gen Accelerator Program entrant
- w/o = Walkover
- r = Retired
- d = Defaulted

=== Finals ===
Semifinals
8	(Australia) Max Purcell	1	4
(Chinese Taipei) Hsu Yu-hsiou	6	6
(Czech Republic) Marek Gengel	3	4
(Australia) Marc Polmans	6	6

Final
(Chinese Taipei) Hsu Yu-hsiou	6	7^{7}
(Australia) Marc Polmans	4	6^{5}

=== Top half ===
First round
LL	(New Zealand) A Rai	6^{4}	4
Q	(Australia) L Saville	7^{7}	6
(Australia) O Jasika	2	6	3
(Australia) T Schoolkate	6	1	6
(United States) Kyle Seelig	7	6
Q	(Japan) Y Takahashi	5	4
(India) P Gunneswaran	6	6^{3}	6^{3}
8	(Australia) M Purcell	4	7^{7}	7^{7}
4	(Australia) L Tu	4	4
Q	(Japan) Yuichiro Inui	6	6
(Chinese Taipei) Y-h Hsu	6	6
Q	(Australia) Mitchell Harper	1	4
Q	(Australia) Jeremy Jin	6^{1}	5
(Australia) J McCabe	7^{7}	7
WC	(Australia) A Bolt	6	6
6	(Australia) D Sweeny	4	1

Second round
Q	(Australia) L Saville	6^{4}	6^{4}
(Australia) T Schoolkate	7^{7}	7^{7}
(United States) K Seelig	3	2
8	(Australia) M Purcell	6	6
Q	(Japan) Y Inui	2	1
(Chinese Taipei) Y-h Hsu	6	6
(Australia) J McCabe	6	7^{7}
WC	(Australia) A Bolt	4	6^{3}

Quarterfinals
(Australia) T Schoolkate	6^{4}	4
8	(Australia) M Purcell	7^{7}	6
(Chinese Taipei) Y-h Hsu	6	6
(Australia) J McCabe	4	0

Semifinals
8	(Australia) M Purcell	1	4
(Chinese Taipei) Y-h Hsu	6	6

=== Bottom half ===
First round
7	(Japan) R Noguchi	6	6
(Australia) P Sekulic	2	4
WC	(Australia) J Beale	4	0
(Czech Republic) M Gengel	6	6
WC	(Australia) B Ellis	6	3	6^{5}
(Australia) A Walton	4	6	7^{7}
Alt	(Northern Mariana Islands) C Sinclair	6^{3}	2
3	(Australia) A Vukic	7^{7}	6
5	(Australia) R Hijikata	3	6	5
(Japan) Y Shimizu	6	4	7
(New Zealand) R Statham	2	2
(Australia) M Polmans	6	6
Q	(United Kingdom) M Whitehouse	3	6	6
(Australia) D Kelly	6	2	4
(India) M Sasikumar	4	6	7^{7}
2	(Australia) J Duckworth	6	3	6^{5}

Second round
7	(Japan) R Noguchi	6^{4}	3
(Czech Republic) M Gengel	7^{7}	6
(Australia) A Walton	7^{10}	6
3	(Australia) A Vukic	6^{8}	1
(Japan) Y Shimizu	6	0	4
(Australia) M Polmans	4	6	6
Q	(United Kingdom) M Whitehouse	3	6	6
(India) M Sasikumar	6	2	0

Quarterfinals
(Czech Republic) M Gengel	6	6
(Australia) A Walton	2	0
(Australia) M Polmans	6	6
Q	(United Kingdom) M Whitehouse	3	1

Semifinals
(Czech Republic) M Gengel	3	4
(Australia) M Polmans	6	6
