= Michaela Haet =

Australian tennis player

- Country (sports): Australia
- Residence: Longueville, Sydney, Australia
- Born: 12 February 1999 (age 26) Greenwich, Connecticut, United States
- Plays: Right-handed (two-handed backhand)
- College: Rice University
- Prize money: $17,365

Singles
- Career record: 42–28
- Career titles: 2 ITF
- Highest ranking: No. 521 (7 August 2017)
- Current ranking: No. 1163 (22 August 2022)

Grand Slam singles results
- Australian Open Junior: 2R (2017)

Doubles
- Career record: 4–8
- Career titles: 0
- Highest ranking: No. 897 (9 January 2023)

Grand Slam doubles results
- Australian Open Junior: 1R (2015, 2016)
- Last updated on: 22 August 2022.

Michaela Haet (born 12 February 1999) is an Australian tennis player.

Haet has a career high WTA singles ranking of 521, achieved on 7 August 2017. She has won two singles titles on the ITF Women's Circuit.

Haet made her WTA Tour main-draw debut at the 2022 Sydney International, where she partnered Lisa Mays in the doubles event.

== ITF Circuit finals ==
=== Singles: 2 (2 titles) ===
Legend $25,000 tournaments $15,000 tournaments	Finals by surface Hard (2–0) Clay (0–0)

Result	W–L	Date	Tournament	Tier	Surface	Opponent	Score
Win	1–0	May 2017	Hua Hin, Thailand	15,000	Hard	(Japan) Chihiro Muramatsu	6–3, 6–7^{(5–7)}, 6–4
Win	2–0	Jul 2017	Hua Hin, Thailand	15,000	Hard	(Chinese Taipei) Hsu Chieh-yu	6–2, 6–7^{(5–7)}, 7–5
