= Alexandra Osborne =

Australian tennis player (born 1995)

- Country (sports): Australia
- Born: 8 April 1995 (age 31) Sydney
- Height: 1.75 m (5 ft 9 in)
- Plays: Left (two-handed backhand)
- College: Arizona State University
- Prize money: $111,489

Singles
- Career record: 106–151
- Highest ranking: No. 626 (21 October 2019)
- Current ranking: No. 1,148 (3 August 2026)

Doubles
- Career record: 171–189
- Career titles: 5 ITF
- Highest ranking: No. 138 (13 July 2026)
- Current ranking: No. 144 (3 August 2026)
- Last updated on: 10 August 2026.

Alexandra Osborne (born 8 April 1995) is an Australian tennis player. She has career-high rankings of world No. 626 in singles by the WTA, reached on 21 October 2019, and No. 138 in doubles, achieved on 13 July 2026.

== Career ==
In 2021, Osborne made her WTA Tour main-draw debut at the 2021 Phillip Island Trophy, where she entered the doubles draw, partnering Astra Sharma. In April, she won her first ITF title at Monastir, Tunisia, partnering New Zealander Paige Hourigan.

== ITF Circuit finals ==
=== Doubles: 17 (8 titles, 9 runner-ups) ===
Legend W100,000 tournaments (3–1) W60 tournaments (0–1) W40 tournaments (2–0) W25/35 tournaments (2–5) W15 tournaments (1–2)	Finals by surface Hard (7–6) Clay (1–3)

Result	W–L	Date	Tournament	Tier	Surface	Partner	Opponents	Score
Loss	0–1	Jun 2019	ITF Shreveport, United States	W15	Clay	(United States) Jennifer Elie	(Montenegro) Vladica Babic (Chinese Taipei) Hsu Chieh-yu	2–6, 0–6
Loss	0–2	Apr 2021	ITF Monastir, Tunisia	W15	Hard	(Mexico) Andrea Villarreal	(Netherlands) Isabelle Haverlag (Russia) Anastasia Pribylova	3–6, 1–6
Win	1–2	Apr 2021	ITF Monastir, Tunisia	W15	Hard	(New Zealand) Paige Hourigan	(Belgium) Magali Kempen (Belgium) Chelsea Vanhoutte	4–1 ret.
Loss	1–3	Nov 2021	ITF Daytona Beach, US	W25	Clay	(United States) Alycia Parks	(United States) Elysia Bolton (United States) Kylie Collins	4–6, 7–6, [5–10]
Loss	1–4	May 2022	ITF Nottingham, United Kingdom	W25	Hard	(Australia) Kimberly Birrell	(United Kingdom) Naiktha Bains (United Kingdom) Maia Lumsden	6–3, 6–7^{(6)}, [9–11]
Loss	1–5	Jun 2022	ITF Périgueux, France	W25	Clay	(United Kingdom) Emily Appleton	(Brazil) Rebeca Pereira (Chile) Daniela Seguel	4–6, 1–6
Loss	1–6	Nov 2022	Sydney Challenger, Australia	W60	Hard	(Indonesia) Jessy Rompies	(Australia) Destanee Aiava (Australia) Lisa Mays	7–5, 3–6, [6–10]
Win	2–6	Jul 2023	ITF Porto, Portugal	W40	Hard	(Australia) Gabriella Da Silva-Fick	(Portugal) Francisca Jorge (Portugal) Matilde Jorge	6–4, 6–3
Win	3–6	Jul 2023	Open Castilla y León, Spain	W25	Hard	(United States) Rasheeda McAdoo	(South Korea) Ku Yeon-woo (Latvia) Diāna Marcinkēviča	6–4, 6–3
Loss	3–7	Jul 2024	Open Castilla y León, Spain	W35	Hard	(United States) Anna Rogers	(Bulgaria) Lia Karatancheva (Slovakia) Radka Zelníčková	6–2, 3–6, [3–10]
Win	4–7	Oct 2024	Tyler Pro Challenge, US	W100	Hard	(United States) Clervie Ngounoue	(United States) Mary Lewis (United States) Brandy Walker	6–2, 6–3
Win	5–7	May 2025	ITF Indian Harbour Beach, United States	W50	Clay	(United States) Haley Giavara	(United Kingdom) Tara Moore (United States) Abigail Rencheli	6–3, 3–6, [10–7]
Loss	5–8	Feb 2026	Burnie International, Australia	W35	Hard	(New Zealand) Monique Barry	(Australia) Gabriella Da Silva-Fick (Australia) Tenika McGiffin	4–6, 3–6
Win	6–8	Mar 2026	ITF Timaru, New Zealand	W35	Hard	(New Zealand) Monique Barry	(Australia) Amy Stevens (Australia) Belle Thompson	6–2, 6–2
Loss	6–9	Mar 2026	Jin'an Open, China	W100	Hard	(Indonesia) Priska Madelyn Nugroho	Ekaterina Ovcharenko; Varvara Panshina	2–6, 2–6
Win	7–9	Apr 2026	ITF Tokyo Open, Japan	W100	Hard	(Hong Kong) Cody Wong	(Hong Kong) Eudice Chong (Chinese Taipei) Liang En-shuo	3–6, 7–5, [10–7]
Win	8–9	Jun 2026	Palmetto Pro Open, US	W100	Hard	(United States) Catherine Harrison	(United States) Anna Rogers (United States) Allura Zamarripa	6–4, 4–6, [10–7]
