= Lisa Mays =

Australian tennis player (born 2000)

- Country (sports): Australia
- Residence: Sydney
- Born: 10 October 2000 (age 25)
- Plays: Right-handed (two-handed backhand)
- College: Texas Tech University
- Prize money: $26,765

Singles
- Career record: 53–63
- Career titles: 0
- Highest ranking: No. 594 (12 June 2023)

Doubles
- Career record: 49–35
- Career titles: 4 ITF
- Highest ranking: No. 319 (14 August 2023)

Lisa Mays (born 10 October 2000) is an inactive Australian tennis player. Mays has a career-high doubles ranking by the Women's Tennis Association (WTA) of 319, achieved on 14 August 2023.

== Career ==
Mays made her WTA Tour main-draw debut at the 2022 Sydney International, where she partnered Michaela Haet in the doubles draw.

In her career, she won four doubles titles on the ITF Women's Circuit.

== ITF Circuit finals ==
=== Singles: 1 (runner-up) ===
Legend W15 tournaments	Finals by surface Hard (0–1)

Result	Date	Tournament	Tier	Surface	Opponent	Score
Loss	Apr 2023	ITF Monastir, Tunisia	W15	Hard	(Bulgaria) Isabella Shinikova	6–3, 4–6, 1–6

=== Doubles: 8 (4 titles, 4 runner-ups) ===
Legend W60 tournaments W25 tournaments W15 tournaments	Finals by surface Hard (4–4)

Result	W–L	Date	Tournament	Tier	Surface	Partner	Opponents	Score
Loss	0–1	Feb 2019	ITF Port Pirie, Australia	W15	Hard	(Germany) Patricia Böntgen	(New Zealand) Valentina Ivanov (Australia) Amber Marshall	5–7, 2–6
Win	1–1	Dec 2019	ITF Norman, United States	W15	Hard	(United Kingdom) Nell Miller	(United States) Carmen Corley (United States) Ivana Corley	7–6^{(5)}, 4–6, [10–8]
Win	2–1	Jul 2022	ITF Monastir, Tunisia	W15	Hard	(New Zealand) Valentina Ivanov	(Chinese Taipei) Cho I-hsuan (China) Yao Xinxin	6–4, 6–7^{(2)}, [10–8]
Loss	2–2	Sep 2022	ITF Darwin, Australia	W25	Hard	(Japan) Ramu Ueda	(Australia) Talia Gibson (Australia) Petra Hule	6–2, 5–7, [5–10]
Loss	2–3	Oct 2022	ITF Cairns, Australia	W25	Hard	(Australia) Destanee Aiava	(United Kingdom) Naiktha Bains (Australia) Alexandra Bozovic	4–6, 4–6
Win	3–3	Oct 2022	Sydney Challenger, Australia	W60	Hard	(Australia) Destanee Aiava	(Australia) Alexandra Osborne (Indonesia) Jessy Rompies	5–7, 6–3, [10–6]
Win	4–3	Apr 2023	ITF Monastir, Tunisia	W15	Hard	(Australia) Lily Fairclough	(Netherlands) Demi Tran (Netherlands) Lian Tran	5–7, 6–2, [10–4]
Loss	4–4	Jun 2023	ITF Monastir, Tunisia	W15	Hard	Aglaya Fedorova	(Spain) Lucia Llinares (France) Lola Marandel	4–6, 6–7^{(5)}
