= 2022 ITF Women's World Tennis Tour (January–March) =

The 2022 ITF Women's World Tennis Tour is the 2022 edition of the second-tier tour for women's professional tennis. It is organised by the International Tennis Federation and is a tier below the WTA Tour. The ITF Women's World Tennis Tour includes tournaments with prize money ranging from $15,000 up to $100,000.

From 1 March, following the Russian invasion of Ukraine the ITF announced that players from Belarus and Russia could still play on the tour but would not be allowed to play under the flag of Belarus or Russia.

== Key ==
Category
W100 tournaments
W80 tournaments
W60 tournaments
W25 tournaments
W15 tournaments

== Month ==
=== January ===
Week of	Tournament	Winner	Runners-up	Semifinalists	Quarterfinalists
January 3	Traralgon International; Traralgon, Australia; Hard; W60+H; Singles – Doubles	(China) Yuan Yue; 6–3, 6–2	(Argentina) Paula Ormaechea	(United States) Sachia Vickery (United States) Emina Bektas	(Croatia) Tereza Mrdeža (Russia) Anastasia Zakharova (United Kingdom) Jodie Burrage (United States) Katie Volynets
January 3	Traralgon International; Traralgon, Australia; Hard; W60+H; Singles – Doubles	(United States) Emina Bektas (United Kingdom) Tara Moore; 0–6, 7–6^{(7–1)}, [10–8]	(United States) Catherine Harrison (Indonesia) Aldila Sutjiadi	(United States) Sachia Vickery (United States) Emina Bektas	(Croatia) Tereza Mrdeža (Russia) Anastasia Zakharova (United Kingdom) Jodie Burrage (United States) Katie Volynets
January 3	Bendigo International; Bendigo, Australia; Hard; W60+H; Singles – Doubles	(Belgium) Ysaline Bonaventure; 6–3, 6–1	(Andorra) Victoria Jiménez Kasintseva	(United States) CoCo Vandeweghe (Liechtenstein) Kathinka von Deichmann	(Belarus) Yuliya Hatouka (Switzerland) Joanne Züger (Russia) Elina Avanesyan (Mexico) Fernanda Contreras
January 3	Bendigo International; Bendigo, Australia; Hard; W60+H; Singles – Doubles	(Mexico) Fernanda Contreras (United States) Alycia Parks; 6–3, 6–1	(Australia) Alison Bai (Australia) Alana Parnaby	(United States) CoCo Vandeweghe (Liechtenstein) Kathinka von Deichmann	(Belarus) Yuliya Hatouka (Switzerland) Joanne Züger (Russia) Elina Avanesyan (Mexico) Fernanda Contreras
January 3	Monastir, Tunisia; Hard; W25; Singles and doubles draws	(Russia) Irina Khromacheva; 1–6, 6–4, 7–5	(Switzerland) Arlinda Rushiti	(Hong Kong) Eudice Chong (Spain) Yvonne Cavallé Reimers	(Romania) Andreea Roșca (Sweden) Fanny Östlund (Japan) Kyōka Okamura (Italy) Lisa Pigato
January 3	Monastir, Tunisia; Hard; W25; Singles and doubles draws	(Hong Kong) Eudice Chong (Hong Kong) Cody Wong; 7–6^{(7–3)}, 7–6^{(10–8)}	(Russia) Ksenia Laskutova (Sweden) Fanny Östlund	(Hong Kong) Eudice Chong (Spain) Yvonne Cavallé Reimers	(Romania) Andreea Roșca (Sweden) Fanny Östlund (Japan) Kyōka Okamura (Italy) Lisa Pigato
January 3	Cairo, Egypt; Clay; W15; Singles and doubles draws	(Greece) Sapfo Sakellaridi; 7–5, 6–3	(United States) Anastasia Nefedova	(Japan) Riko Sawayanagi (Russia) Anna Ureke	(Italy) Andrea Maria Artimedi (Russia) Mariia Tkacheva (Netherlands) Lian Tran (Bulgaria) Ani Vangelova
January 3	Cairo, Egypt; Clay; W15; Singles and doubles draws	(Russia) Mariia Tkacheva (Russia) Anastasia Zolotareva; 6–3, 1–6, [10–8]	(Ukraine) Mariia Bergen (Bulgaria) Ani Vangelova	(Japan) Riko Sawayanagi (Russia) Anna Ureke	(Italy) Andrea Maria Artimedi (Russia) Mariia Tkacheva (Netherlands) Lian Tran (Bulgaria) Ani Vangelova
January 10	Blumenau-Gaspar, Brazil; Clay; W25; Singles and doubles draws	(Germany) Lena Papadakis; 6–1, 7–6^{(8–6)}	(Slovenia) Pia Lovrič	(Netherlands) Eva Vedder (Chile) Bárbara Gatica	(Argentina) María Lourdes Carlé (Brazil) Ingrid Gamarra Martins (United States) Jessie Aney (Belarus) Jana Kolodynska
January 10	Blumenau-Gaspar, Brazil; Clay; W25; Singles and doubles draws	(Venezuela) Andrea Gámiz (Chile) Bárbara Gatica; 6–4, 6–1	(United States) Sofia Sewing (Netherlands) Eva Vedder	(Netherlands) Eva Vedder (Chile) Bárbara Gatica	(Argentina) María Lourdes Carlé (Brazil) Ingrid Gamarra Martins (United States) Jessie Aney (Belarus) Jana Kolodynska
January 10	Monastir, Tunisia; Hard; W25; Singles and doubles draws	(Poland) Maja Chwalińska; 6–4, 6–4	(France) Carole Monnet	(Italy) Lisa Pigato (Netherlands) Suzan Lamens	(Bulgaria) Isabella Shinikova (Spain) Yvonne Cavallé Reimers (Switzerland) Arlinda Rushiti (Canada) Katherine Sebov
January 10	Monastir, Tunisia; Hard; W25; Singles and doubles draws	(Hong Kong) Eudice Chong (Hong Kong) Cody Wong; 6–2, 6–3	(Italy) Nuria Brancaccio (Italy) Lisa Pigato	(Italy) Lisa Pigato (Netherlands) Suzan Lamens	(Bulgaria) Isabella Shinikova (Spain) Yvonne Cavallé Reimers (Switzerland) Arlinda Rushiti (Canada) Katherine Sebov
January 10	GB Pro-Series Bath; Bath, United Kingdom; Hard (indoor); W25; Singles and doubles draws	(Sweden) Caijsa Hennemann; 6–1, 7–5	(United Kingdom) Eliz Maloney	(Czech Republic) Gabriela Knutson (United Kingdom) Freya Christie	(Estonia) Elena Malõgina (United Kingdom) Eden Silva (Latvia) Anna Ozerova (United Kingdom) Sarah Beth Grey
January 10	GB Pro-Series Bath; Bath, United Kingdom; Hard (indoor); W25; Singles and doubles draws	(Sweden) Caijsa Hennemann (Estonia) Elena Malõgina; 6–4, 6–3	(Romania) Arina Vasilescu (United Kingdom) Emily Webley-Smith	(Czech Republic) Gabriela Knutson (United Kingdom) Freya Christie	(Estonia) Elena Malõgina (United Kingdom) Eden Silva (Latvia) Anna Ozerova (United Kingdom) Sarah Beth Grey
January 10	Vero Beach, United States; Clay; W25; Singles and doubles draws	(United States) Sophie Chang; 6–1, 1–6, 6–2	(Belarus) Vera Lapko	(United States) Elvina Kalieva (United States) Chanelle Van Nguyen	(United States) Reese Brantmeier (United States) Louisa Chirico (United States) Rasheeda McAdoo (Russia) Anastasiya Antal
January 10	Vero Beach, United States; Clay; W25; Singles and doubles draws	(United States) Sophie Chang (United States) Allie Kiick; 6–3, 6–3	(United States) Anna Rogers (United States) Christina Rosca	(United States) Elvina Kalieva (United States) Chanelle Van Nguyen	(United States) Reese Brantmeier (United States) Louisa Chirico (United States) Rasheeda McAdoo (Russia) Anastasiya Antal
January 10	Cairo, Egypt; Clay; W15; Singles and doubles draws	(Greece) Sapfo Sakellaridi; 6–1, 6–4	(Russia) Anastasia Zolotareva	(Russia) Anna Ureke (United States) Anastasia Nefedova	(Canada) Marina Stakusic (Japan) Riko Sawayanagi (Italy) Sofia Rocchetti (Netherlands) Lian Tran
January 10	Cairo, Egypt; Clay; W15; Singles and doubles draws	(Russia) Mariia Tkacheva (Russia) Anastasia Zolotareva; 6–1, 6–4	(Greece) Sapfo Sakellaridi (China) Youmi Zhuoma	(Russia) Anna Ureke (United States) Anastasia Nefedova	(Canada) Marina Stakusic (Japan) Riko Sawayanagi (Italy) Sofia Rocchetti (Netherlands) Lian Tran
January 10	Antalya, Turkey; Clay; W15; Singles and doubles draws	(United States) Hurricane Tyra Black; 6–0, 6–4	(Czech Republic) Barbora Palicová	(Bulgaria) Mihaela Tsoneva (Russia) Diana Demidova	(Italy) Anastasia Piangerelli (Sweden) Kajsa Rinaldo Persson (Russia) Valeriia Olianovskaia (Romania) Ilinca Amariei
January 10	Antalya, Turkey; Clay; W15; Singles and doubles draws	(Turkey) Doğa Türkmen (Turkey) Melis Ayda Uyar; 2–6, 6–2, [10–8]	(Bulgaria) Daria Shalamanova (Bulgaria) Beatris Spasova	(Bulgaria) Mihaela Tsoneva (Russia) Diana Demidova	(Italy) Anastasia Piangerelli (Sweden) Kajsa Rinaldo Persson (Russia) Valeriia Olianovskaia (Romania) Ilinca Amariei
January 17	Florianópolis, Brazil; Hard; W25; Singles and doubles draws	(United States) Elizabeth Mandlik; 6–0, 6–4	(Chile) Bárbara Gatica	(Czech Republic) Aneta Laboutková (Argentina) Julia Riera	(Russia) Maria Bondarenko (United States) Caroline Lampl (Germany) Lena Papadakis (Netherlands) Eva Vedder
January 17	Florianópolis, Brazil; Hard; W25; Singles and doubles draws	(Venezuela) Andrea Gámiz (United States) Sofia Sewing; 6–4, 6–1	(Chile) Bárbara Gatica (Brazil) Rebeca Pereira	(Czech Republic) Aneta Laboutková (Argentina) Julia Riera	(Russia) Maria Bondarenko (United States) Caroline Lampl (Germany) Lena Papadakis (Netherlands) Eva Vedder
January 17	Manacor, Spain; Hard; W25; Singles and doubles draws	(Lithuania) Justina Mikulskytė; 6–3, 6–3	(Japan) Yuki Naito	(Czech Republic) Nikola Bartůňková (Russia) Oksana Selekhmeteva	(Netherlands) Quirine Lemoine (North Macedonia) Lina Gjorcheska (Germany) Stephanie Wagner (Italy) Martina Di Giuseppe
January 17	Manacor, Spain; Hard; W25; Singles and doubles draws	(Czech Republic) Anastasia Dețiuc (Russia) Yana Sizikova; 6–2, 6–3	(Netherlands) Quirine Lemoine (Netherlands) Bibiane Schoofs	(Czech Republic) Nikola Bartůňková (Russia) Oksana Selekhmeteva	(Netherlands) Quirine Lemoine (North Macedonia) Lina Gjorcheska (Germany) Stephanie Wagner (Italy) Martina Di Giuseppe
January 17	Monastir, Tunisia; Hard; W25; Singles and doubles draws	(South Korea) Han Na-lae; 6–3, 6–2	(Canada) Katherine Sebov	(Czech Republic) Sára Bejlek (Poland) Maja Chwalińska	(Russia) Ekaterina Makarova (Russia) Anastasia Tikhonova (Uzbekistan) Nigina Abduraimova (Bulgaria) Isabella Shinikova
January 17	Monastir, Tunisia; Hard; W25; Singles and doubles draws	(Hong Kong) Eudice Chong (Hong Kong) Cody Wong; 6–0, 6–1	(Russia) Amina Anshba (Russia) Maria Timofeeva	(Czech Republic) Sára Bejlek (Poland) Maja Chwalińska	(Russia) Ekaterina Makarova (Russia) Anastasia Tikhonova (Uzbekistan) Nigina Abduraimova (Bulgaria) Isabella Shinikova
January 17	Cairo, Egypt; Clay; W15; Singles and doubles draws	(Russia) Anastasia Zolotareva; 1–6, 6–3, 6–2	(Greece) Sapfo Sakellaridi	(France) Séléna Janicijevic (Austria) Sinja Kraus	(France) Flavie Brugnone (United States) Anastasia Nefedova (Hungary) Adrienn Nagy (Austria) Melanie Klaffner
January 17	Cairo, Egypt; Clay; W15; Singles and doubles draws	(Romania) Oana Georgeta Simion (Russia) Anna Ureke; 6–3, 7–6^{(7–4)}	(Russia) Mariia Tkacheva (Russia) Anastasia Zolotareva	(France) Séléna Janicijevic (Austria) Sinja Kraus	(France) Flavie Brugnone (United States) Anastasia Nefedova (Hungary) Adrienn Nagy (Austria) Melanie Klaffner
January 17	Cancún, Mexico; Hard; W15; Singles and doubles draws	(United States) Hina Inoue; 1–6, 6–3, 7–6^{(8–6)}	(Mexico) María José Portillo Ramírez	(United States) Jessica Failla (Germany) Natalia Siedliska	(Slovakia) Bianca Behúlová (Canada) Stacey Fung (France) Julie Belgraver (Slovakia) Katarína Kužmová
January 17	Cancún, Mexico; Hard; W15; Singles and doubles draws	(Japan) Natsuho Arakawa (United States) Hina Inoue; 6–4, 7–5	(France) Julie Belgraver (France) Jade Bornay	(United States) Jessica Failla (Germany) Natalia Siedliska	(Slovakia) Bianca Behúlová (Canada) Stacey Fung (France) Julie Belgraver (Slovakia) Katarína Kužmová
January 17	Tatarstan Open; Kazan, Russia; Hard (indoor); W15; Singles and doubles draws	(Russia) Polina Kudermetova; 6–0, 6–4	(Russia) Anastasia Kovaleva	(Russia) Alisa Kummel (Russia) Angelina Gabueva	(Belarus) Darya Shauha (Russia) Anastasiya Apalikhina (Russia) Anna Ukolova (Belarus) Alena Bairasheuskaya
January 17	Tatarstan Open; Kazan, Russia; Hard (indoor); W15; Singles and doubles draws	(Russia) Anna Ukolova (Belarus) Kseniya Yersh; 6–7^{(0–7)}, 6–3, [10–7]	(Russia) Polina Iatcenko (Russia) Daria Kudashova	(Russia) Alisa Kummel (Russia) Angelina Gabueva	(Belarus) Darya Shauha (Russia) Anastasiya Apalikhina (Russia) Anna Ukolova (Belarus) Alena Bairasheuskaya
January 17	Antalya, Turkey; Clay; W15; Singles and doubles draws	(Czech Republic) Barbora Palicová; 6–3, 7–6^{(7–2)}	(Turkey) İlay Yörük	(Bulgaria) Mihaela Tsoneva (Slovakia) Ingrid Vojčináková	(Romania) Ilinca Amariei (Russia) Valeriia Olianovskaia (Spain) Judith Perelló Saavedra (United States) Hurricane Tyra Black
January 17	Antalya, Turkey; Clay; W15; Singles and doubles draws	(Turkey) Doğa Türkmen (Turkey) Melis Ayda Uyar; 6–7^{(5–7)}, 6–4, [10–4]	(Bulgaria) Julia Stamatova (Netherlands) Stéphanie Visscher	(Bulgaria) Mihaela Tsoneva (Slovakia) Ingrid Vojčináková	(Romania) Ilinca Amariei (Russia) Valeriia Olianovskaia (Spain) Judith Perelló Saavedra (United States) Hurricane Tyra Black
January 24	Open Andrézieux-Bouthéon 42; Andrézieux-Bouthéon, France; Hard (indoor); W60; Singles – Doubles	(Romania) Ana Bogdan; 7–5, 6–3	(Russia) Anna Blinkova	(France) Jessika Ponchet (Liechtenstein) Kathinka von Deichmann	(Switzerland) Ylena In-Albon (France) Salma Djoubri (Cyprus) Raluca Șerban (France) Océane Dodin
January 24	Open Andrézieux-Bouthéon 42; Andrézieux-Bouthéon, France; Hard (indoor); W60; Singles – Doubles	(France) Estelle Cascino (France) Jessika Ponchet; 6–4, 6–1	(United Kingdom) Alicia Barnett (United Kingdom) Olivia Nicholls	(France) Jessika Ponchet (Liechtenstein) Kathinka von Deichmann	(Switzerland) Ylena In-Albon (France) Salma Djoubri (Cyprus) Raluca Șerban (France) Océane Dodin
January 24	Orlando USTA Pro Circuit Event; Orlando, United States; Hard; W60; Singles – Doubles	(China) Zheng Qinwen; 6–0, 6–1	(United States) Christina McHale	(Spain) Irene Burillo Escorihuela (United States) Elvina Kalieva	(United States) Hailey Baptiste (United States) Usue Maitane Arconada (China) Wang Xiyu (Belarus) Vera Lapko
January 24	Orlando USTA Pro Circuit Event; Orlando, United States; Hard; W60; Singles – Doubles	(United States) Hailey Baptiste (United States) Whitney Osuigwe; 7–6^{(9–7)}, 7–5	(United States) Angela Kulikov (United States) Rianna Valdes	(Spain) Irene Burillo Escorihuela (United States) Elvina Kalieva	(United States) Hailey Baptiste (United States) Usue Maitane Arconada (China) Wang Xiyu (Belarus) Vera Lapko
January 24	Florianópolis, Brazil; Hard; W25; Singles and doubles draws	(United States) Elizabeth Mandlik; 6–3, 6–4	(Netherlands) Eva Vedder	(Russia) Elina Avanesyan (Chile) Bárbara Gatica	(Netherlands) Merel Hoedt (Germany) Lena Papadakis (Argentina) María Lourdes Carlé (United States) Sofia Sewing
January 24	Florianópolis, Brazil; Hard; W25; Singles and doubles draws	(Venezuela) Andrea Gámiz (United States) Sofia Sewing; 7–6^{(7–2)}, 6–4	(United States) Jessie Aney (Brazil) Ingrid Gamarra Martins	(Russia) Elina Avanesyan (Chile) Bárbara Gatica	(Netherlands) Merel Hoedt (Germany) Lena Papadakis (Argentina) María Lourdes Carlé (United States) Sofia Sewing
January 24	Cairo, Egypt; Clay; W25; Singles and doubles draws	(France) Séléna Janicijevic; 7–5, 3–6, 6–3	(Austria) Sinja Kraus	(United States) Anastasia Nefedova (Hungary) Réka Luca Jani	(Czech Republic) Sára Bejlek (Russia) Anna Ureke (Lithuania) Justina Mikulskytė (Russia) Anastasia Zolotareva
January 24	Cairo, Egypt; Clay; W25; Singles and doubles draws	(Austria) Melanie Klaffner (Austria) Sinja Kraus; 7–5, 6–3	(Hungary) Adrienn Nagy (India) Prarthana Thombare	(United States) Anastasia Nefedova (Hungary) Réka Luca Jani	(Czech Republic) Sára Bejlek (Russia) Anna Ureke (Lithuania) Justina Mikulskytė (Russia) Anastasia Zolotareva
January 24	Manacor, Spain; Hard; W25; Singles and doubles draws	(Spain) Yvonne Cavallé Reimers; 6–2, 6–2	(Turkey) İpek Öz	(Czech Republic) Linda Nosková (Czech Republic) Nikola Bartůňková	(Spain) María Gutiérrez Carrasco (Luxembourg) Mandy Minella (North Macedonia) Lina Gjorcheska (Netherlands) Quirine Lemoine
January 24	Manacor, Spain; Hard; W25; Singles and doubles draws	(Mexico) Fernanda Contreras (Spain) Andrea Lázaro García; 6–1, 6–4	(Slovakia) Tereza Mihalíková (Czech Republic) Linda Nosková	(Czech Republic) Linda Nosková (Czech Republic) Nikola Bartůňková	(Spain) María Gutiérrez Carrasco (Luxembourg) Mandy Minella (North Macedonia) Lina Gjorcheska (Netherlands) Quirine Lemoine
January 24	Monastir, Tunisia; Hard; W25; Singles and doubles draws	(Uzbekistan) Nigina Abduraimova; 6–3, 4–6, 7–6^{(9–7)}	(South Korea) Han Na-lae	(Croatia) Tereza Mrdeža (Russia) Maria Timofeeva	(Belgium) Ysaline Bonaventure (Russia) Anastasia Tikhonova (Japan) Yuriko Miyazaki (Canada) Katherine Sebov
January 24	Monastir, Tunisia; Hard; W25; Singles and doubles draws	(Hong Kong) Eudice Chong (South Korea) Han Na-lae; 7–5, 6–3	(Belarus) Anna Kubareva (Russia) Maria Timofeeva	(Croatia) Tereza Mrdeža (Russia) Maria Timofeeva	(Belgium) Ysaline Bonaventure (Russia) Anastasia Tikhonova (Japan) Yuriko Miyazaki (Canada) Katherine Sebov
January 24	GB Pro-Series Loughborough; Loughborough, United Kingdom; Hard (indoor); W25; Singles and doubles draws	(Denmark) Sofia Samavati; 6–2, 5–5, ret.	(Georgia (country)) Mariam Bolkvadze	(Czech Republic) Gabriela Knutson (Estonia) Elena Malõgina	(United Kingdom) Sarah Beth Grey (Croatia) Jana Fett (Finland) Anastasia Kulikova (Netherlands) Jasmijn Gimbrère
January 24	GB Pro-Series Loughborough; Loughborough, United Kingdom; Hard (indoor); W25; Singles and doubles draws	(Germany) Anna Gabric (Romania) Arina Vasilescu; 6–4, 7–5	(United Kingdom) Emily Appleton (United Kingdom) Ali Collins	(Czech Republic) Gabriela Knutson (Estonia) Elena Malõgina	(United Kingdom) Sarah Beth Grey (Croatia) Jana Fett (Finland) Anastasia Kulikova (Netherlands) Jasmijn Gimbrère
January 24	Cancún, Mexico; Hard; W15; Singles and doubles draws	(Canada) Stacey Fung; 7–6^{(7–1)}, 7–5	(France) Julie Belgraver	(France) Jade Bornay (Germany) Natalia Siedliska	(Japan) Miharu Imanishi (Canada) Bianca Fernandez (Japan) Mayuka Aikawa (Japan) Haine Ogata
January 24	Cancún, Mexico; Hard; W15; Singles and doubles draws	(Japan) Miharu Imanishi (Japan) Haine Ogata; 6–2, 6–3	(France) Julie Belgraver (France) Jade Bornay	(France) Jade Bornay (Germany) Natalia Siedliska	(Japan) Miharu Imanishi (Canada) Bianca Fernandez (Japan) Mayuka Aikawa (Japan) Haine Ogata
January 24	Antalya, Turkey; Clay; W15; Singles and doubles draws	(Turkey) İlay Yörük; 6–2, 6–3	(Spain) Claudia Hoste Ferrer	(Netherlands) Anouk Koevermans (Italy) Martina Caregaro	(Japan) Rinko Matsuda (Russia) Ekaterina Shalimova (Slovakia) Ingrid Vojčináková (Bulgaria) Zinovia Vaneva
January 24	Antalya, Turkey; Clay; W15; Singles and doubles draws	Doubles competition was abandoned due to ongoing poor weather		(Netherlands) Anouk Koevermans (Italy) Martina Caregaro	(Japan) Rinko Matsuda (Russia) Ekaterina Shalimova (Slovakia) Ingrid Vojčináková (Bulgaria) Zinovia Vaneva
January 31	Georgia's Rome Tennis Open; Rome, United States; Hard (indoor); W60; Singles – Doubles	(Germany) Tatjana Maria; 6–4, 4–6, 6–2	(United States) Alycia Parks	(United States) Caroline Dolehide (United States) Emma Navarro	(Serbia) Katarina Jokić (United States) Francesca Di Lorenzo (United States) Katie Volynets (United States) Robin Anderson
January 31	Georgia's Rome Tennis Open; Rome, United States; Hard (indoor); W60; Singles – Doubles	(United States) Sophie Chang (United States) Angela Kulikov; 6–3, 6–7^{(2–7)}, [10–7]	(United States) Emina Bektas (United Kingdom) Tara Moore	(United States) Caroline Dolehide (United States) Emma Navarro	(Serbia) Katarina Jokić (United States) Francesca Di Lorenzo (United States) Katie Volynets (United States) Robin Anderson
January 31	Tucumán, Argentina; Clay; W25; Singles and doubles draws	(Czech Republic) Brenda Fruhvirtová; 6–3, 6–3	(Brazil) Carolina Alves	(Argentina) Paula Ormaechea (Venezuela) Andrea Gámiz	(Argentina) Solana Sierra (Russia) Elina Avanesyan (Germany) Katharina Gerlach (Argentina) Jazmín Ortenzi
January 31	Tucumán, Argentina; Clay; W25; Singles and doubles draws	(Chile) Bárbara Gatica (Brazil) Rebeca Pereira; 6–3, 7–5	(Venezuela) Andrea Gámiz (Argentina) Paula Ormaechea	(Argentina) Paula Ormaechea (Venezuela) Andrea Gámiz	(Argentina) Solana Sierra (Russia) Elina Avanesyan (Germany) Katharina Gerlach (Argentina) Jazmín Ortenzi
January 31	Sharm El Sheikh, Egypt; Hard; W25; Singles and doubles draws	(Italy) Lucrezia Stefanini; 6–2, 3–0, ret.	(Romania) Alexandra Cadanțu-Ignatik	(Russia) Anastasia Zakharova (France) Tessah Andrianjafitrimo	(Romania) Irina Fetecău (Russia) Marina Melnikova (Belgium) Ysaline Bonaventure (Hungary) Réka Luca Jani
January 31	Sharm El Sheikh, Egypt; Hard; W25; Singles and doubles draws	(Netherlands) Isabelle Haverlag (Lithuania) Justina Mikulskytė; 6–1, 6–2	(Romania) Irina Fetecău (Switzerland) Simona Waltert	(Russia) Anastasia Zakharova (France) Tessah Andrianjafitrimo	(Romania) Irina Fetecău (Russia) Marina Melnikova (Belgium) Ysaline Bonaventure (Hungary) Réka Luca Jani
January 31	Manacor, Spain; Hard; W25; Singles and doubles draws	(Spain) Andrea Lázaro García; 2–6, 7–6^{(7–2)}, 6–1	(France) Elsa Jacquemot	(Hungary) Dalma Gálfi (Spain) Jéssica Bouzas Maneiro	(Spain) Yvonne Cavallé Reimers (North Macedonia) Lina Gjorcheska (Luxembourg) Mandy Minella (Italy) Giulia Gatto-Monticone
January 31	Manacor, Spain; Hard; W25; Singles and doubles draws	(Mexico) Fernanda Contreras (Spain) Andrea Lázaro García; 6–1, 3–6, [10–6]	(Slovakia) Tereza Mihalíková (Czech Republic) Linda Nosková	(Hungary) Dalma Gálfi (Spain) Jéssica Bouzas Maneiro	(Spain) Yvonne Cavallé Reimers (North Macedonia) Lina Gjorcheska (Luxembourg) Mandy Minella (Italy) Giulia Gatto-Monticone
January 31	Cancún, Mexico; Hard; W15; Singles and doubles draws	(France) Julie Belgraver; 1–6, 6–3, 7–5	(Japan) Miharu Imanishi	(Canada) Stacey Fung (United States) Jenna DeFalco	(Russia) Anastasia Sysoeva (Japan) Mayuka Aikawa (Netherlands) Eva Vedder (Japan) Chisa Hosonuma
January 31	Cancún, Mexico; Hard; W15; Singles and doubles draws	(Sweden) Jacqueline Cabaj Awad (Portugal) Ana Filipa Santos; 6–4, 6–3	(France) Astrid Cirotte (Russia) Anastasia Sysoeva	(Canada) Stacey Fung (United States) Jenna DeFalco	(Russia) Anastasia Sysoeva (Japan) Mayuka Aikawa (Netherlands) Eva Vedder (Japan) Chisa Hosonuma
January 31	Monastir, Tunisia; Hard; W15; Singles and doubles draws	(United States) Chiara Scholl; 6–2, 6–4	(Japan) Haruna Arakawa	(France) Nina Radovanovic (France) Kélia Le Bihan	(Ukraine) Ganna Poznikhirenko (Algeria) Inès Ibbou (Netherlands) Jasmijn Gimbrère (Japan) Mana Ayukawa
January 31	Monastir, Tunisia; Hard; W15; Singles and doubles draws	(Japan) Haruna Arakawa (Netherlands) Jasmijn Gimbrère; 6–4, 6–0	(France) Kélia Le Bihan (France) Nina Radovanovic	(France) Nina Radovanovic (France) Kélia Le Bihan	(Ukraine) Ganna Poznikhirenko (Algeria) Inès Ibbou (Netherlands) Jasmijn Gimbrère (Japan) Mana Ayukawa
January 31	Antalya, Turkey; Clay; W15; Singles and doubles draws	(United States) Hurricane Tyra Black; 6–2, 4–6, 6–4	(Turkey) İlay Yörük	(Russia) Diana Demidova (Japan) Naho Sato	(Poland) Joanna Zawadzka (Slovakia) Chantal Škamlová (Spain) Marta González Encinas (Netherlands) Stéphanie Visscher
January 31	Antalya, Turkey; Clay; W15; Singles and doubles draws	(Turkey) Doğa Türkmen (Turkey) Melis Ayda Uyar; 4–6, 7–6^{(7–4)}, [10–7]	(Russia) Evgeniya Burdina (Russia) Aleksandra Pospelova	(Russia) Diana Demidova (Japan) Naho Sato	(Poland) Joanna Zawadzka (Slovakia) Chantal Škamlová (Spain) Marta González Encinas (Netherlands) Stéphanie Visscher

=== February ===
Week of	Tournament	Winner	Runners-up	Semifinalists	Quarterfinalists
February 7	Open de l'Isère; Grenoble, France; Hard (indoor); W60; Singles – Doubles	(United Kingdom) Katie Boulter; 7–6^{(7–2)}, 6–7^{(6–8)}, 6–2	(Russia) Anna Blinkova	(Liechtenstein) Kathinka von Deichmann (Germany) Tatjana Maria	(Netherlands) Arantxa Rus (France) Chloé Paquet (Belgium) Greet Minnen (Italy) Martina Trevisan
February 7	Open de l'Isère; Grenoble, France; Hard (indoor); W60; Singles – Doubles	(Japan) Yuriko Miyazaki (India) Prarthana Thombare; 6–3, 6–3	(United Kingdom) Alicia Barnett (United Kingdom) Olivia Nicholls	(Liechtenstein) Kathinka von Deichmann (Germany) Tatjana Maria	(Netherlands) Arantxa Rus (France) Chloé Paquet (Belgium) Greet Minnen (Italy) Martina Trevisan
February 7	Tucumán, Argentina; Clay; W25; Singles and doubles draws	(Czech Republic) Brenda Fruhvirtová; 6–3, 1–6, 6–4	(Argentina) Paula Ormaechea	(Venezuela) Andrea Gámiz (United States) Elizabeth Mandlik	(Argentina) Solana Sierra (Argentina) Julia Riera (Mexico) Ana Sofía Sánchez (Chile) Bárbara Gatica
February 7	Tucumán, Argentina; Clay; W25; Singles and doubles draws	(Argentina) María Lourdes Carlé (Argentina) Julieta Estable; 3–6, 6–0, [10–7]	(Italy) Nicole Fossa Huergo (Bolivia) Noelia Zeballos	(Venezuela) Andrea Gámiz (United States) Elizabeth Mandlik	(Argentina) Solana Sierra (Argentina) Julia Riera (Mexico) Ana Sofía Sánchez (Chile) Bárbara Gatica
February 7	Canberra, Australia; Hard; W25; Singles and doubles draws	(United States) Asia Muhammad; 6–7^{(6–8)}, 6–3, 6–2	(Australia) Priscilla Hon	(Australia) Arina Rodionova (Japan) Chihiro Muramatsu	(Australia) Tina Nadine Smith (Australia) Kimberly Birrell (Australia) Olivia Gadecki (Australia) Jaimee Fourlis
February 7	Canberra, Australia; Hard; W25; Singles and doubles draws	(United States) Asia Muhammad (Australia) Arina Rodionova; 6–3, 3–6, [10–6]	(Australia) Alison Bai (Australia) Jaimee Fourlis	(Australia) Arina Rodionova (Japan) Chihiro Muramatsu	(Australia) Tina Nadine Smith (Australia) Kimberly Birrell (Australia) Olivia Gadecki (Australia) Jaimee Fourlis
February 7	Sharm El Sheikh, Egypt; Hard; W25; Singles and doubles draws	(Romania) Alexandra Cadanțu-Ignatik; 0–6, 6–3, 6–3	(Russia) Marina Melnikova	(France) Tessah Andrianjafitrimo (Hungary) Tímea Babos	(Serbia) Natalija Stevanović (Russia) Anastasia Zakharova (Hong Kong) Eudice Chong (Romania) Elena-Teodora Cadar
February 7	Sharm El Sheikh, Egypt; Hard; W25; Singles and doubles draws	(Greece) Sapfo Sakellaridi (Hong Kong) Cody Wong; 7–5, 4–6, [10–6]	(Belarus) Yuliya Hatouka (Russia) Anastasia Zakharova	(France) Tessah Andrianjafitrimo (Hungary) Tímea Babos	(Serbia) Natalija Stevanović (Russia) Anastasia Zakharova (Hong Kong) Eudice Chong (Romania) Elena-Teodora Cadar
February 7	Cancún, Mexico; Hard; W25; Singles and doubles draws	(Latvia) Darja Semenistaja; 4–6, 7–6^{(7–5)}, 6–2	(Israel) Lina Glushko	(United States) Hanna Chang (Canada) Rebecca Marino	(Japan) Nao Hibino (Canada) Stacey Fung (Bosnia and Herzegovina) Dea Herdželaš (Canada) Katherine Sebov
February 7	Cancún, Mexico; Hard; W25; Singles and doubles draws	(Ukraine) Kateryna Bondarenko (Canada) Carol Zhao; 7–5, 6–7^{(5–7)}, [10–7]	(Sweden) Jacqueline Cabaj Awad (Israel) Lina Glushko	(United States) Hanna Chang (Canada) Rebecca Marino	(Japan) Nao Hibino (Canada) Stacey Fung (Bosnia and Herzegovina) Dea Herdželaš (Canada) Katherine Sebov
February 7	Porto, Portugal; Hard (indoor); W25; Singles and doubles draws	(Austria) Julia Grabher; 6–3, 6–7^{(2–7)}, 7–5	(Poland) Maja Chwalińska	(Belarus) Vera Lapko (Sweden) Mirjam Björklund	(Japan) Kurumi Nara (Bulgaria) Julia Terziyska (France) Léolia Jeanjean (Slovenia) Nika Radišić
February 7	Porto, Portugal; Hard (indoor); W25; Singles and doubles draws	(Greece) Valentini Grammatikopoulou (Netherlands) Quirine Lemoine; 6–2, 6–3	(France) Audrey Albié (France) Léolia Jeanjean	(Belarus) Vera Lapko (Sweden) Mirjam Björklund	(Japan) Kurumi Nara (Bulgaria) Julia Terziyska (France) Léolia Jeanjean (Slovenia) Nika Radišić
February 7	Birmingham, United Kingdom; Hard (indoor); W25; Singles and doubles draws	(United Kingdom) Sonay Kartal; 5–7, 6–3, 6–2	(United Kingdom) Talia Neilson Gatenby	(Germany) Nastasja Schunk (Belgium) Magali Kempen	(Germany) Eva Lys (United Kingdom) Lauryn John-Baptiste (United Kingdom) Jodie Burrage (Turkey) Pemra Özgen
February 7	Birmingham, United Kingdom; Hard (indoor); W25; Singles and doubles draws	(Lithuania) Andrė Lukošiūtė (United Kingdom) Eliz Maloney; 7–6^{(7–4)}, 3–6, [10–8]	(United States) Quinn Gleason (United States) Catherine Harrison	(Germany) Nastasja Schunk (Belgium) Magali Kempen	(Germany) Eva Lys (United Kingdom) Lauryn John-Baptiste (United Kingdom) Jodie Burrage (Turkey) Pemra Özgen
February 7	Jhajjar, India; Clay; W15; Singles and doubles draws	(Russia) Anna Ureke; 6–4, 4–6, 6–4	(India) Zeel Desai	(Thailand) Punnin Kovapitukted (India) Vaidehi Chaudhari	(India) Shruti Ahlawat (India) Sandeepti Singh Rao (India) Akanksha Dileep Nitture (India) Humera Baharmus
February 7	Jhajjar, India; Clay; W15; Singles and doubles draws	(Thailand) Punnin Kovapitukted (Russia) Anna Ureke; 7–5, 6–3	(India) Vaidehi Chaudhari (India) Mihika Yadav	(Thailand) Punnin Kovapitukted (India) Vaidehi Chaudhari	(India) Shruti Ahlawat (India) Sandeepti Singh Rao (India) Akanksha Dileep Nitture (India) Humera Baharmus
February 7	Villena, Spain; Hard; W15; Singles and doubles draws	(Spain) Jéssica Bouzas Maneiro; 6–2, 6–1	(United States) Ashley Lahey	(Estonia) Maileen Nuudi (Sweden) Julita Saner	(Germany) Joëlle Steur (Malta) Helene Pellicano (South Korea) Shin Ji-ho (Russia) Tatiana Barkova
February 7	Villena, Spain; Hard; W15; Singles and doubles draws	(Spain) Lucía Cortez Llorca (Germany) Joëlle Steur; 6–2, 6–4	(Germany) Katharina Hering (Spain) Olga Parres Azcoitia	(Estonia) Maileen Nuudi (Sweden) Julita Saner	(Germany) Joëlle Steur (Malta) Helene Pellicano (South Korea) Shin Ji-ho (Russia) Tatiana Barkova
February 7	Monastir, Tunisia; Hard; W15; Singles and doubles draws	(Belarus) Kristina Dmitruk; 6–2, 6–1	(Switzerland) Valentina Ryser	(Belgium) Hanne Vandewinkel (Japan) Miyu Kato	(Japan) Haruna Arakawa (France) Emma Léné (Hong Kong) Adithya Karunaratne (Russia) Maria Sholokhova
February 7	Monastir, Tunisia; Hard; W15; Singles and doubles draws	(Japan) Miyu Kato (Japan) Kisa Yoshioka; 6–4, 7–5	(Belarus) Kristina Dmitruk (Algeria) Inès Ibbou	(Belgium) Hanne Vandewinkel (Japan) Miyu Kato	(Japan) Haruna Arakawa (France) Emma Léné (Hong Kong) Adithya Karunaratne (Russia) Maria Sholokhova
February 7	Antalya, Turkey; Clay; W15; Singles and doubles draws	(France) Séléna Janicijevic; 6–3, 6–2	(Italy) Angelica Moratelli	(Italy) Nuria Brancaccio (Hungary) Amarissa Kiara Tóth	(Japan) Naho Sato (Spain) Marta González Encinas (Romania) Oana Gavrilă (Romania) Vanessa Popa Teiușanu
February 7	Antalya, Turkey; Clay; W15; Singles and doubles draws	(Croatia) Mariana Dražić (Germany) Katharina Hobgarski; 7–5, 6–4	(Italy) Angelica Moratelli (Hungary) Amarissa Kiara Tóth	(Italy) Nuria Brancaccio (Hungary) Amarissa Kiara Tóth	(Japan) Naho Sato (Spain) Marta González Encinas (Romania) Oana Gavrilă (Romania) Vanessa Popa Teiușanu
February 14	AK Ladies Open; Altenkirchen, Germany; Carpet (indoor); W60; Singles – Doubles	(Belgium) Greet Minnen; 6–4, 6–3	(Ukraine) Daria Snigur	(Georgia (country)) Mariam Bolkvadze (Russia) Erika Andreeva	(Spain) Cristina Bucșa (Germany) Nastasja Schunk (Liechtenstein) Kathinka von Deichmann (Switzerland) Joanne Züger
February 14	AK Ladies Open; Altenkirchen, Germany; Carpet (indoor); W60; Singles – Doubles	(Georgia (country)) Mariam Bolkvadze (United Kingdom) Samantha Murray Sharan; 6–3, 7–5	(Switzerland) Susan Bandecchi (Switzerland) Simona Waltert	(Georgia (country)) Mariam Bolkvadze (Russia) Erika Andreeva	(Spain) Cristina Bucșa (Germany) Nastasja Schunk (Liechtenstein) Kathinka von Deichmann (Switzerland) Joanne Züger
February 14	Canberra, Australia; Hard; W25; Singles and doubles draws	(United States) Asia Muhammad; 6–1, 7–6^{(9–7)}	(Australia) Arina Rodionova	(Australia) Jaimee Fourlis (Australia) Priscilla Hon	(South Africa) Zoë Kruger (Australia) Olivia Gadecki (South Africa) Isabella Kruger (Australia) Abbie Myers
February 14	Canberra, Australia; Hard; W25; Singles and doubles draws	(United States) Asia Muhammad (Australia) Arina Rodionova; 7–6^{(7–2)}, 7–6^{(7–5)}	(Australia) Alison Bai (Australia) Jaimee Fourlis	(Australia) Jaimee Fourlis (Australia) Priscilla Hon	(South Africa) Zoë Kruger (Australia) Olivia Gadecki (South Africa) Isabella Kruger (Australia) Abbie Myers
February 14	Cancún, Mexico; Hard; W25; Singles and doubles draws	(Czech Republic) Linda Fruhvirtová; 6–3, 6–4	(Canada) Rebecca Marino	(Germany) Alexandra Vecic (Canada) Carol Zhao	(Bosnia and Herzegovina) Dea Herdželaš (Netherlands) Richèl Hogenkamp (United States) Sachia Vickery (United States) Hanna Chang
February 14	Cancún, Mexico; Hard; W25; Singles and doubles draws	(United States) Anna Rogers (United States) Christina Rosca; 6–1, 6–4	(Russia) Maria Bondarenko (Latvia) Darja Semenistaja	(Germany) Alexandra Vecic (Canada) Carol Zhao	(Bosnia and Herzegovina) Dea Herdželaš (Netherlands) Richèl Hogenkamp (United States) Sachia Vickery (United States) Hanna Chang
February 14	Porto, Portugal; Hard (indoor); W25; Singles and doubles draws	(Japan) Moyuka Uchijima; 6–3, 6–1	(France) Léolia Jeanjean	(Czech Republic) Monika Kilnarová (Luxembourg) Mandy Minella	(Germany) Laura Siegemund (Hungary) Adrienn Nagy (Japan) Kurumi Nara (France) Audrey Albié
February 14	Porto, Portugal; Hard (indoor); W25; Singles and doubles draws	(Greece) Valentini Grammatikopoulou (Netherlands) Quirine Lemoine; 6–2, 6–0	(Hungary) Adrienn Nagy (India) Prarthana Thombare	(Czech Republic) Monika Kilnarová (Luxembourg) Mandy Minella	(Germany) Laura Siegemund (Hungary) Adrienn Nagy (Japan) Kurumi Nara (France) Audrey Albié
February 14	Antalya, Turkey; Clay; W25; Singles and doubles draws	(China) Wang Yafan; 7–5, 6–3	(Germany) Katharina Hobgarski	(Romania) Andreea Prisăcariu (Italy) Angelica Moratelli	(Italy) Camilla Rosatello (Turkey) Ayla Aksu (Turkey) Zeynep Sönmez (Hungary) Réka Luca Jani
February 14	Antalya, Turkey; Clay; W25; Singles and doubles draws	(Russia) Amina Anshba (Belgium) Marie Benoît; 7–5, 7–6^{(7–4)}	(Romania) Andreea Roșca (Romania) Ioana Loredana Roșca	(Romania) Andreea Prisăcariu (Italy) Angelica Moratelli	(Italy) Camilla Rosatello (Turkey) Ayla Aksu (Turkey) Zeynep Sönmez (Hungary) Réka Luca Jani
February 14	Glasgow, United Kingdom; Hard (indoor); W25; Singles and doubles draws	(United Kingdom) Sonay Kartal; 7–6^{(7–5)}, 7–5	(Czech Republic) Barbora Palicová	(South Korea) Park So-hyun (United Kingdom) Jodie Burrage	(Lithuania) Justina Mikulskytė (United Kingdom) Jasmine Conway (Slovakia) Katarína Strešnáková (Netherlands) Lesley Pattinama Kerkhove
February 14	Glasgow, United Kingdom; Hard (indoor); W25; Singles and doubles draws	(United States) Quinn Gleason (United States) Catherine Harrison; 6–4, 6–1	(Lithuania) Justina Mikulskytė (Russia) Valeria Savinykh	(South Korea) Park So-hyun (United Kingdom) Jodie Burrage	(Lithuania) Justina Mikulskytė (United Kingdom) Jasmine Conway (Slovakia) Katarína Strešnáková (Netherlands) Lesley Pattinama Kerkhove
February 14	Sharm El Sheikh, Egypt; Hard; W15; Singles and doubles draws	(Japan) Hiromi Abe; 6–2, 6–1	(Romania) Elena-Teodora Cadar	(Chinese Taipei) Lee Pei-chi (Lithuania) Klaudija Bubelytė	(Belarus) Aliona Falei (France) Jade Bornay (Slovakia) Barbora Matúšová (Chinese Taipei) Lee Ya-hsin
February 14	Sharm El Sheikh, Egypt; Hard; W15; Singles and doubles draws	(Chinese Taipei) Lee Pei-chi (Chinese Taipei) Lee Ya-hsin; 6–2, 3–6, [10–7]	(Finland) Laura Hietaranta (Greece) Michaela Laki	(Chinese Taipei) Lee Pei-chi (Lithuania) Klaudija Bubelytė	(Belarus) Aliona Falei (France) Jade Bornay (Slovakia) Barbora Matúšová (Chinese Taipei) Lee Ya-hsin
February 14	Gurugram, India; Hard; W15; Singles and doubles draws	(Thailand) Punnin Kovapitukted; 6–1, 6–2	(India) Vaidehi Chaudhari	(India) Zeel Desai (India) Yubarani Banerjee	(India) Sathwika Sama (India) Sravya Shivani Chilakalapudi (India) Shrivalli Bhamidipaty (India) Shruti Ahlawat
February 14	Gurugram, India; Hard; W15; Singles and doubles draws	(India) Humera Baharmus (India) Shrivalli Bhamidipaty; 6–3, 1–6, [10–3]	(Thailand) Punnin Kovapitukted (Russia) Anna Ureke	(India) Zeel Desai (India) Yubarani Banerjee	(India) Sathwika Sama (India) Sravya Shivani Chilakalapudi (India) Shrivalli Bhamidipaty (India) Shruti Ahlawat
February 14	Monastir, Tunisia; Hard; W15; Singles and doubles draws	(Japan) Mana Ayukawa; 1–6, 6–1, 6–4	(Slovakia) Radka Zelníčková	(Germany) Mara Guth (France) Diana Martynov	(Belgium) Sofia Costoulas (Russia) Anastasia Sukhotina (Italy) Eleonora Alvisi (United States) Clervie Ngounoue
February 14	Monastir, Tunisia; Hard; W15; Singles and doubles draws	(Belarus) Kristina Dmitruk (Russia) Maria Sholokhova; 3–6, 6–2, [10–5]	(Belgium) Sofia Costoulas (United States) Clervie Ngounoue	(Germany) Mara Guth (France) Diana Martynov	(Belgium) Sofia Costoulas (Russia) Anastasia Sukhotina (Italy) Eleonora Alvisi (United States) Clervie Ngounoue
February 21	Nur-Sultan Challenger; Nur-Sultan, Kazakhstan; Hard (indoor); W60; Singles – Doubles	(Russia) Anzhelika Isaeva; 6–4, 0–0, ret.	(Belgium) Greet Minnen	(Russia) Anastasia Zakharova (Belgium) Ysaline Bonaventure	(Russia) Valeria Savinykh (Germany) Eva Lys (Japan) Kurumi Nara (Spain) Aliona Bolsova
February 21	Nur-Sultan Challenger; Nur-Sultan, Kazakhstan; Hard (indoor); W60; Singles – Doubles	(Russia) Ekaterina Makarova (Czech Republic) Linda Nosková; 6–2, 6–3	(Czech Republic) Anna Sisková (Russia) Maria Timofeeva	(Russia) Anastasia Zakharova (Belgium) Ysaline Bonaventure	(Russia) Valeria Savinykh (Germany) Eva Lys (Japan) Kurumi Nara (Spain) Aliona Bolsova
February 21	Santo Domingo, Dominican Republic; Hard; W25; Singles and doubles draws	(United Kingdom) Katie Swan; 6–4, 6–3	(United States) Sachia Vickery	(Poland) Maja Chwalińska (United States) Danielle Lao	(Canada) Carol Zhao (Spain) Marina Bassols Ribera (Spain) Yvonne Cavallé Reimers (Switzerland) Joanne Züger
February 21	Santo Domingo, Dominican Republic; Hard; W25; Singles and doubles draws	(United States) Anna Rogers (United States) Christina Rosca; 6–2, 6–2	(Netherlands) Jasmijn Gimbrère (Netherlands) Isabelle Haverlag	(Poland) Maja Chwalińska (United States) Danielle Lao	(Canada) Carol Zhao (Spain) Marina Bassols Ribera (Spain) Yvonne Cavallé Reimers (Switzerland) Joanne Züger
February 21	Mâcon, France; Hard (indoor); W25; Singles and doubles draws	(Russia) Vitalia Diatchenko; 6–4, 6–3	(Italy) Cristiana Ferrando	(France) Margot Yerolymos (Germany) Mona Barthel	(Belgium) Magali Kempen (Bosnia and Herzegovina) Nefisa Berberović (France) Elsa Jacquemot (Lithuania) Justina Mikulskytė
February 21	Mâcon, France; Hard (indoor); W25; Singles and doubles draws	(Switzerland) Xenia Knoll (Romania) Andreea Mitu; 6–1, 6–1	(United Kingdom) Emily Appleton (United Kingdom) Ali Collins	(France) Margot Yerolymos (Germany) Mona Barthel	(Belgium) Magali Kempen (Bosnia and Herzegovina) Nefisa Berberović (France) Elsa Jacquemot (Lithuania) Justina Mikulskytė
February 21	Antalya, Turkey; Clay; W25; Singles and doubles draws	(Hungary) Réka Luca Jani; 6–4, 6–3	(China) Wang Yafan	(Croatia) Tara Würth (Spain) Leyre Romero Gormaz	(Spain) Rosa Vicens Mas (China) Lu Jingjing (Czech Republic) Jesika Malečková (Greece) Sapfo Sakellaridi
February 21	Antalya, Turkey; Clay; W25; Singles and doubles draws	(Czech Republic) Miriam Kolodziejová (Czech Republic) Jesika Malečková; 7–6^{(7–2)}, 7–6^{(7–4)}	(Japan) Funa Kozaki (Japan) Naho Sato	(Croatia) Tara Würth (Spain) Leyre Romero Gormaz	(Spain) Rosa Vicens Mas (China) Lu Jingjing (Czech Republic) Jesika Malečková (Greece) Sapfo Sakellaridi
February 21	Sharm El Sheikh, Egypt; Hard; W15; Singles and doubles draws	(Hong Kong) Cody Wong; 6–4, 6–1	(Russia) Mirra Andreeva	(Japan) Hiromi Abe (Switzerland) Alina Granwehr	(Romania) Elena-Teodora Cadar (Germany) Silvia Ambrosio (Hong Kong) Wu Ho-ching (Chinese Taipei) Lee Pei-chi
February 21	Sharm El Sheikh, Egypt; Hard; W15; Singles and doubles draws	(Japan) Hiromi Abe (Chinese Taipei) Lee Pei-chi; 5–7, 7–5, [10–2]	(Romania) Elena-Teodora Cadar (Hong Kong) Cody Wong	(Japan) Hiromi Abe (Switzerland) Alina Granwehr	(Romania) Elena-Teodora Cadar (Germany) Silvia Ambrosio (Hong Kong) Wu Ho-ching (Chinese Taipei) Lee Pei-chi
February 21	Ahmedabad, India; Clay; W15; Singles and doubles draws	(Germany) Emily Seibold; 6–2, 6–1	(India) Zeel Desai	(India) Shrivalli Bhamidipaty (India) Akanksha Dileep Nitture	(India) Shreya Tatavarthy (Thailand) Punnin Kovapitukted (India) Vaidehi Chaudhari (India) Yubarani Banerjee
February 21	Ahmedabad, India; Clay; W15; Singles and doubles draws	(Thailand) Punnin Kovapitukted (Russia) Anna Ureke; 6–3, 6–1	(India) Sharmada Balu (India) Sravya Shivani Chilakalapudi	(India) Shrivalli Bhamidipaty (India) Akanksha Dileep Nitture	(India) Shreya Tatavarthy (Thailand) Punnin Kovapitukted (India) Vaidehi Chaudhari (India) Yubarani Banerjee
February 21	Monastir, Tunisia; Hard; W15; Singles and doubles draws	(Japan) Haruna Arakawa; Walkover	(Japan) Ayumi Morita	(Germany) Julia Middendorf (Slovakia) Radka Zelníčková	(Slovakia) Eszter Méri (Italy) Arianna Zucchini (Japan) Aoi Ito (United States) Clervie Ngounoue
February 21	Monastir, Tunisia; Hard; W15; Singles and doubles draws	(United States) Clervie Ngounoue (Belgium) Hanne Vandewinkel; 6–1, 6–2	(Germany) Mara Guth (Germany) Mia Mack	(Germany) Julia Middendorf (Slovakia) Radka Zelníčková	(Slovakia) Eszter Méri (Italy) Arianna Zucchini (Japan) Aoi Ito (United States) Clervie Ngounoue
February 28	Arcadia Women's Pro Open; Arcadia, United States; Hard; W60; Singles – Doubles	(Canada) Rebecca Marino; 7–6^{(7–0)}, 6–1	(United States) Alycia Parks	(France) Chloé Paquet (United States) Ellie Douglas	(United States) Caroline Dolehide (United States) Liv Hovde (Australia) Priscilla Hon (United States) Louisa Chirico
February 28	Arcadia Women's Pro Open; Arcadia, United States; Hard; W60; Singles – Doubles	(United States) Ashlyn Krueger (United States) Robin Montgomery; Walkover	(United Kingdom) Harriet Dart (Mexico) Giuliana Olmos	(France) Chloé Paquet (United States) Ellie Douglas	(United States) Caroline Dolehide (United States) Liv Hovde (Australia) Priscilla Hon (United States) Louisa Chirico
February 28	Bendigo, Australia; Hard; W25; Singles and doubles draws	(United States) Asia Muhammad; 6–2, 6–4	(Australia) Olivia Gadecki	(Australia) Ellen Perez (India) Ankita Raina	(Japan) Chihiro Muramatsu (South Korea) Han Na-lae (Australia) Jaimee Fourlis (Australia) Arina Rodionova
February 28	Bendigo, Australia; Hard; W25; Singles and doubles draws	(Australia) Jaimee Fourlis (Australia) Ellen Perez; 6–1, 6–1	(Australia) Gabriella Da Silva-Fick (Australia) Alana Parnaby	(Australia) Ellen Perez (India) Ankita Raina	(Japan) Chihiro Muramatsu (South Korea) Han Na-lae (Australia) Jaimee Fourlis (Australia) Arina Rodionova
February 28	Santo Domingo, Dominican Republic; Hard; W25; Singles and doubles draws	(United States) Adriana Reami; 6–3, 7–5	(Switzerland) Joanne Züger	Irina Khromacheva (Argentina) María Lourdes Carlé	(United Kingdom) Katie Swan (France) Salma Djoubri (United States) Danielle Lao; Anastasia Tikhonova
February 28	Santo Domingo, Dominican Republic; Hard; W25; Singles and doubles draws	Irina Khromacheva (Serbia) Natalija Stevanović; 6–1, 7–6^{(7–5)}	(Latvia) Darja Semenistaja; Anastasia Tikhonova	Irina Khromacheva (Argentina) María Lourdes Carlé	(United Kingdom) Katie Swan (France) Salma Djoubri (United States) Danielle Lao; Anastasia Tikhonova
February 28	Guayaquil, Ecuador; Hard; W25; Singles and doubles draws	(France) Tessah Andrianjafitrimo; 6–3, 6–3	(United States) Hanna Chang	(Belgium) Sofia Costoulas; Marina Melnikova	(Canada) Carol Zhao (Netherlands) Suzan Lamens (Brazil) Carolina Alves (Argentina) Jazmín Ortenzi
February 28	Guayaquil, Ecuador; Hard; W25; Singles and doubles draws	(Venezuela) Andrea Gámiz (United States) Sofia Sewing; 6–4, 7–5	(Italy) Nicole Fossa Huergo (Bolivia) Noelia Zeballos	(Belgium) Sofia Costoulas; Marina Melnikova	(Canada) Carol Zhao (Netherlands) Suzan Lamens (Brazil) Carolina Alves (Argentina) Jazmín Ortenzi
February 28	Open de Touraine; Joué-lès-Tours, France; Hard (indoor); W25; Singles and doubles draws	(Belgium) Magali Kempen; 6–3, 6–4	(Germany) Nastasja Schunk	(Switzerland) Arlinda Rushiti (France) Audrey Albié	(France) Chloé Noël (Croatia) Tereza Mrdeža (United Kingdom) Jodie Burrage; Oksana Selekhmeteva
February 28	Open de Touraine; Joué-lès-Tours, France; Hard (indoor); W25; Singles and doubles draws	(United Kingdom) Emily Appleton (United Kingdom) Ali Collins; 2–6, 6–4, [10–6]	(Germany) Mona Barthel (Belgium) Yanina Wickmayer	(Switzerland) Arlinda Rushiti (France) Audrey Albié	(France) Chloé Noël (Croatia) Tereza Mrdeža (United Kingdom) Jodie Burrage; Oksana Selekhmeteva
February 28	Nur-Sultan Challenger; Nur-Sultan, Kazakhstan; Hard (indoor); W25; Singles and doubles draws	Anastasia Zakharova; 6–3, 6–1	Mariia Tkacheva	(Czech Republic) Linda Nosková (Uzbekistan) Nigina Abduraimova	Yuliya Hatouka; Anna Kubareva; Valeria Savinykh (Spain) Aliona Bolsova
February 28	Nur-Sultan Challenger; Nur-Sultan, Kazakhstan; Hard (indoor); W25; Singles and doubles draws	(Latvia) Kamilla Bartone; Ekaterina Makarova; 1–6, 7–5, [10–8]	(Czech Republic) Anna Sisková; Maria Timofeeva	(Czech Republic) Linda Nosková (Uzbekistan) Nigina Abduraimova	Yuliya Hatouka; Anna Kubareva; Valeria Savinykh (Spain) Aliona Bolsova
February 28	Sharm El Sheikh, Egypt; Hard; W15; Singles and doubles draws	Polina Iatcenko; Walkover	Darya Shauha	(Czech Republic) Linda Klimovičová (Romania) Elena-Teodora Cadar	Evialina Laskevich (Romania) Karola Bejenaru (Hong Kong) Cody Wong (Slovenia) Živa Falkner
February 28	Sharm El Sheikh, Egypt; Hard; W15; Singles and doubles draws	(Chinese Taipei) Lee Pei-chi (Chinese Taipei) Lee Ya-hsin; 6–3, 6–0	Polina Iatcenko; Darya Shauha	(Czech Republic) Linda Klimovičová (Romania) Elena-Teodora Cadar	Evialina Laskevich (Romania) Karola Bejenaru (Hong Kong) Cody Wong (Slovenia) Živa Falkner
February 28	Nagpur, India; Clay; W15; Singles and doubles draws	(India) Sahaja Yamalapalli; 6–5, ret.	(Germany) Emily Seibold	(India) Zeel Desai; Anna Ureke	(India) Sathwika Sama (India) Vaidehi Chaudhari (India) Jennifer Luikham (India) Sai Samhitha Chamarthi
February 28	Nagpur, India; Clay; W15; Singles and doubles draws	(India) Sai Samhitha Chamarthi (India) Soha Sadiq; 3–6, 6–4, [13–11]	(India) Shrivalli Bhamidipaty (India) Sathwika Sama	(India) Zeel Desai; Anna Ureke	(India) Sathwika Sama (India) Vaidehi Chaudhari (India) Jennifer Luikham (India) Sai Samhitha Chamarthi
February 28	Monastir, Tunisia; Hard; W15; Singles and doubles draws	(Bulgaria) Julia Terziyska; 7–5, 5–7, 6–1	(Germany) Kathleen Kanev	(Japan) Haruna Arakawa (Switzerland) Nadine Keller	(Malta) Francesca Curmi (Belgium) Clara Vlasselaer (France) Yasmine Mansouri (Slovakia) Katarína Kužmová
February 28	Monastir, Tunisia; Hard; W15; Singles and doubles draws	(Greece) Eleni Christofi (Greece) Michaela Laki; 7–5, 6–3	(Japan) Haruna Arakawa (Japan) Natsuho Arakawa	(Japan) Haruna Arakawa (Switzerland) Nadine Keller	(Malta) Francesca Curmi (Belgium) Clara Vlasselaer (France) Yasmine Mansouri (Slovakia) Katarína Kužmová
February 28	Antalya, Turkey; Clay; W15; Singles and doubles draws	(Spain) Rosa Vicens Mas; 6–4, 5–7, 6–1	(Serbia) Dejana Radanović	(Spain) Carlota Martínez Círez (Japan) Rina Saigo	(Japan) Naho Sato (France) Alice Ramé (Romania) Ilona Georgiana Ghioroaie; Diana Demidova
February 28	Antalya, Turkey; Clay; W15; Singles and doubles draws	(Czech Republic) Miriam Kolodziejová (Czech Republic) Jesika Malečková; 6–2, 6–4	(Greece) Sapfo Sakellaridi; Anastasia Zolotareva	(Spain) Carlota Martínez Círez (Japan) Rina Saigo	(Japan) Naho Sato (France) Alice Ramé (Romania) Ilona Georgiana Ghioroaie; Diana Demidova

=== March ===
Week of	Tournament	Winner	Runners-up	Semifinalists	Quarterfinalists
March 7	Guanajuato Open; Irapuato, Mexico; Hard; W60+H; Singles – Doubles	(China) Zhu Lin; 6–4, 6–1	(Canada) Rebecca Marino	Anastasia Tikhonova (Brazil) Carolina Alves	(United States) Jamie Loeb (United States) Dalayna Hewitt (United States) Ellie Douglas (Australia) Seone Mendez
March 7	Guanajuato Open; Irapuato, Mexico; Hard; W60+H; Singles – Doubles	(United States) Kaitlyn Christian; Lidziya Marozava; 6–0, 6–2	Anastasia Tikhonova (Latvia) Daniela Vismane	Anastasia Tikhonova (Brazil) Carolina Alves	(United States) Jamie Loeb (United States) Dalayna Hewitt (United States) Ellie Douglas (Australia) Seone Mendez
March 7	Bendigo, Australia; Hard; W25; Singles and doubles draws	(Australia) Jaimee Fourlis; 6–3, 0–0, ret.	(Australia) Olivia Gadecki	(Japan) Moyuka Uchijima (Australia) Destanee Aiava	(Australia) Arina Rodionova (Australia) Ellen Perez (South Korea) Han Na-lae (Japan) Hiroko Kuwata
March 7	Bendigo, Australia; Hard; W25; Singles and doubles draws	(India) Rutuja Bhosale (India) Ankita Raina; 4–6, 6–3, [10–4]	(Australia) Alexandra Bozovic (Poland) Weronika Falkowska	(Japan) Moyuka Uchijima (Australia) Destanee Aiava	(Australia) Arina Rodionova (Australia) Ellen Perez (South Korea) Han Na-lae (Japan) Hiroko Kuwata
March 7	Salinas, Ecuador; Hard; W25; Singles and doubles draws	(Chile) Bárbara Gatica; 6–4, 7–6^{(7–2)}	(Netherlands) Suzan Lamens	(France) Tessah Andrianjafitrimo (Chile) Daniela Seguel	(United States) Sofia Sewing (Belgium) Sofia Costoulas (United States) Jessie Aney (Brazil) Laura Pigossi
March 7	Salinas, Ecuador; Hard; W25; Singles and doubles draws	(Chile) Bárbara Gatica (Brazil) Rebeca Pereira; 6–4, 6–0	(Colombia) María Herazo González (Colombia) María Paulina Pérez	(France) Tessah Andrianjafitrimo (Chile) Daniela Seguel	(United States) Sofia Sewing (Belgium) Sofia Costoulas (United States) Jessie Aney (Brazil) Laura Pigossi
March 7	Antalya, Turkey; Clay; W25; Singles and doubles draws	(Croatia) Petra Marčinko; 6–4, 6–1	(France) Carole Monnet	(Serbia) Ivana Jorović (Turkey) İpek Öz	(Italy) Martina Di Giuseppe (Uzbekistan) Nigina Abduraimova (Spain) Rosa Vicens Mas (Italy) Elisabetta Cocciaretto
March 7	Antalya, Turkey; Clay; W25; Singles and doubles draws	(Japan) Funa Kozaki (Japan) Naho Sato; 6–2, 6–4	(Belgium) Marie Benoît (Romania) Nicoleta Dascălu	(Serbia) Ivana Jorović (Turkey) İpek Öz	(Italy) Martina Di Giuseppe (Uzbekistan) Nigina Abduraimova (Spain) Rosa Vicens Mas (Italy) Elisabetta Cocciaretto
March 7	Sharm El Sheikh, Egypt; Hard; W15; Singles and doubles draws	Mariia Tkacheva; 3–6, 6–3, 6–3	(Hong Kong) Cody Wong	Kristina Dmitruk (Romania) Elena-Teodora Cadar	(United Kingdom) Alice Gillan (Japan) Ramu Ueda (Japan) Hiromi Abe (Hungary) Adrienn Nagy
March 7	Sharm El Sheikh, Egypt; Hard; W15; Singles and doubles draws	(Japan) Hiromi Abe (Czech Republic) Ivana Šebestová; 6–4, 1–6, [10–4]	(Germany) Silvia Ambrosio (Romania) Elena-Teodora Cadar	Kristina Dmitruk (Romania) Elena-Teodora Cadar	(United Kingdom) Alice Gillan (Japan) Ramu Ueda (Japan) Hiromi Abe (Hungary) Adrienn Nagy
March 7	Amiens, France; Clay (indoor); W15+H; Singles and doubles draws	(France) Lucie Nguyen Tan; 6–4, 7–5	(Germany) Nicole Rivkin	(France) Marie Témin (France) Aubane Droguet	(Denmark) Sofia Samavati (Spain) Lucía Cortez Llorca (France) Diana Martynov (France) Émeline Dartron
March 7	Amiens, France; Clay (indoor); W15+H; Singles and doubles draws	(France) Océane Babel (France) Lucie Nguyen Tan; 6–3, 6–4	(Italy) Tatiana Pieri (Italy) Federica Rossi	(France) Marie Témin (France) Aubane Droguet	(Denmark) Sofia Samavati (Spain) Lucía Cortez Llorca (France) Diana Martynov (France) Émeline Dartron
March 7	Monastir, Tunisia; Hard; W15; Singles and doubles draws	(Switzerland) Céline Naef; 3–6, 6–2, 7–5	(Germany) Lara Schmidt	(Bulgaria) Julia Terziyska (France) Manon Léonard	(Slovakia) Katarína Kužmová (Japan) Michika Ozeki (Sweden) Melis Yasar (Netherlands) Anouck Vrancken Peeters
March 7	Monastir, Tunisia; Hard; W15; Singles and doubles draws	(Japan) Michika Ozeki (United States) Lauren Proctor; 7–5, 7–6^{(9–7)}	(Bulgaria) Julia Terziyska (Belgium) Eliessa Vanlangendonck	(Bulgaria) Julia Terziyska (France) Manon Léonard	(Slovakia) Katarína Kužmová (Japan) Michika Ozeki (Sweden) Melis Yasar (Netherlands) Anouck Vrancken Peeters
March 7	Naples, United States; Clay; W15; Singles and doubles draws	(United States) Madison Sieg; 6–2, 1–0, ret.	(United States) Samantha Crawford	(United States) Qavia Lopez (United States) Hina Inoue	(Switzerland) Valentina Ryser (United States) Akasha Urhobo (United States) Rachel Gailis (Japan) Mao Mushika
March 7	Naples, United States; Clay; W15; Singles and doubles draws	(Latvia) Līga Dekmeijere; Maria Kononova; 6–7^{(0–7)}, 6–3, [19–17]	(United States) Qavia Lopez (United States) Madison Sieg	(United States) Qavia Lopez (United States) Hina Inoue	(Switzerland) Valentina Ryser (United States) Akasha Urhobo (United States) Rachel Gailis (Japan) Mao Mushika
March 14	Anapoima, Colombia; Clay; W25; Singles and doubles draws	Marina Melnikova; 6–2, 6–1	(Argentina) Paula Ormaechea	(Netherlands) Suzan Lamens (Netherlands) Eva Vedder	(Brazil) Carolina Alves (Latvia) Daniela Vismane (Switzerland) Ylena In-Albon (Hungary) Réka Luca Jani
March 14	Anapoima, Colombia; Clay; W25; Singles and doubles draws	(Switzerland) Ylena In-Albon (Hungary) Réka Luca Jani; 1–6, 6–3, [10–7]	(Argentina) María Lourdes Carlé (Brazil) Laura Pigossi	(Netherlands) Suzan Lamens (Netherlands) Eva Vedder	(Brazil) Carolina Alves (Latvia) Daniela Vismane (Switzerland) Ylena In-Albon (Hungary) Réka Luca Jani
March 14	Antalya, Turkey; Clay; W25; Singles and doubles draws	(Croatia) Petra Marčinko; 1–6, 6–4, 6–4	(Italy) Elisabetta Cocciaretto	Diana Shnaider (China) Wang Yafan	(United Kingdom) Sonay Kartal (Romania) Alexandra Cadanțu-Ignatik (Israel) Nicole Khirin (Spain) Andrea Lázaro García
March 14	Antalya, Turkey; Clay; W25; Singles and doubles draws	Diana Shnaider (Hungary) Amarissa Kiara Tóth; 6–4, 6–2	Amina Anshba; Maria Timofeeva	Diana Shnaider (China) Wang Yafan	(United Kingdom) Sonay Kartal (Romania) Alexandra Cadanțu-Ignatik (Israel) Nicole Khirin (Spain) Andrea Lázaro García
March 14	Sharm El Sheikh, Egypt; Hard; W15; Singles and doubles draws	(Romania) Elena-Teodora Cadar; 7–5, 6–3	(Hong Kong) Eudice Chong	Mariia Tkacheva (United Kingdom) Anna Brogan	(Chinese Taipei) Lee Ya-hsuan (Switzerland) Bojana Klincov (China) Yang Yidi (Chinese Taipei) Lee Pei-chi
March 14	Sharm El Sheikh, Egypt; Hard; W15; Singles and doubles draws	(Hong Kong) Eudice Chong (Hong Kong) Cody Wong; 6–3, 6–3	(Romania) Karola Bejenaru (Greece) Martha Matoula	Mariia Tkacheva (United Kingdom) Anna Brogan	(Chinese Taipei) Lee Ya-hsuan (Switzerland) Bojana Klincov (China) Yang Yidi (Chinese Taipei) Lee Pei-chi
March 14	Gonesse, France; Clay (indoor); W15; Singles and doubles draws	(Belgium) Lara Salden; 6–2, 7–6^{(8–6)}	(Denmark) Sofia Samavati	(France) Océane Babel (Germany) Julia Middendorf	(Germany) Nicole Rivkin (France) Émeline Dartron (Germany) Anna Gabric (Italy) Federica Rossi
March 14	Gonesse, France; Clay (indoor); W15; Singles and doubles draws	(France) Flavie Brugnone (Serbia) Tamara Čurović; 6–2, 6–3	(Germany) Julia Middendorf (Germany) Nicole Rivkin	(France) Océane Babel (Germany) Julia Middendorf	(Germany) Nicole Rivkin (France) Émeline Dartron (Germany) Anna Gabric (Italy) Federica Rossi
March 14	Marrakesh, Morocco; Clay; W15; Singles and doubles draws	(Italy) Eleonora Alvisi; 6–3, 6–1	(United States) Clervie Ngounoue	(Croatia) Lucija Ćirić Bagarić (Germany) Chantal Sauvant	(France) Jade Bornay (Slovenia) Pia Lovrič; Mirra Andreeva (Spain) Carlota Martínez Círez
March 14	Marrakesh, Morocco; Clay; W15; Singles and doubles draws	(Switzerland) Naïma Karamoko (Portugal) Inês Murta; 6–2, 6–7^{(2–7)}, [10–5]	(Croatia) Lucija Ćirić Bagarić (United States) Clervie Ngounoue	(Croatia) Lucija Ćirić Bagarić (Germany) Chantal Sauvant	(France) Jade Bornay (Slovenia) Pia Lovrič; Mirra Andreeva (Spain) Carlota Martínez Círez
March 14	Palma Nova, Spain; Clay; W15; Singles and doubles draws	(Spain) Guiomar Maristany; 6–3, 6–2	(Argentina) Solana Sierra	(Spain) Claudia Hoste Ferrer (Romania) Oana Georgeta Simion	(Spain) Yvonne Cavallé Reimers (Malta) Francesca Curmi (Hong Kong) Adithya Karunaratne (Spain) Alba Rey García
March 14	Palma Nova, Spain; Clay; W15; Singles and doubles draws	(Slovenia) Veronika Erjavec (Slovenia) Nina Potočnik; 7–5, 6–3	(Italy) Angelica Moratelli (Italy) Aurora Zantedeschi	(Spain) Claudia Hoste Ferrer (Romania) Oana Georgeta Simion	(Spain) Yvonne Cavallé Reimers (Malta) Francesca Curmi (Hong Kong) Adithya Karunaratne (Spain) Alba Rey García
March 14	Monastir, Tunisia; Hard; W15; Singles and doubles draws	(Japan) Sakura Hosogi; 6–3, 6–3	(France) Manon Léonard	(Belgium) Eliessa Vanlangendonck (France) Julie Belgraver	(Switzerland) Céline Naef (France) Yasmine Mansouri (Algeria) Inès Ibbou (Italy) Angelica Raggi
March 14	Monastir, Tunisia; Hard; W15; Singles and doubles draws	(Serbia) Elena Milovanović (Belgium) Eliessa Vanlangendonck; 6–4, 6–7^{(4–7)}, [10–3]	(Japan) Anri Nagata (Japan) Kisa Yoshioka	(Belgium) Eliessa Vanlangendonck (France) Julie Belgraver	(Switzerland) Céline Naef (France) Yasmine Mansouri (Algeria) Inès Ibbou (Italy) Angelica Raggi
March 21	ACT Clay Court International; Canberra, Australia; Clay; W60; Singles – Doubles	(Japan) Moyuka Uchijima; 6–2, 6–2	(Australia) Olivia Gadecki	(Australia) Kimberly Birrell (Japan) Kurumi Nara	(South Korea) Han Na-lae (South Korea) Jang Su-jeong (Australia) Ellen Perez (Australia) Jaimee Fourlis
March 21	ACT Clay Court International; Canberra, Australia; Clay; W60; Singles – Doubles	(South Korea) Han Na-lae (South Korea) Jang Su-jeong; 3–6, 6–2, [10–5]	(Japan) Yuki Naito (Japan) Moyuka Uchijima	(Australia) Kimberly Birrell (Japan) Kurumi Nara	(South Korea) Han Na-lae (South Korea) Jang Su-jeong (Australia) Ellen Perez (Australia) Jaimee Fourlis
March 21	Medellín, Colombia; Clay; W25; Singles and doubles draws	(Netherlands) Suzan Lamens; 6–4, 6–2	(Switzerland) Ylena In-Albon	(Chile) Bárbara Gatica (Latvia) Daniela Vismane	(United States) Hanna Chang (Brazil) Laura Pigossi (Argentina) Julia Riera (Argentina) María Lourdes Carlé
March 21	Medellín, Colombia; Clay; W25; Singles and doubles draws	(Switzerland) Conny Perrin (Chile) Daniela Seguel; 6–2, 5–7, [10–8]	(Argentina) María Lourdes Carlé (Brazil) Laura Pigossi	(Chile) Bárbara Gatica (Latvia) Daniela Vismane	(United States) Hanna Chang (Brazil) Laura Pigossi (Argentina) Julia Riera (Argentina) María Lourdes Carlé
March 21	Le Havre, France; Clay (indoor); W25; Singles and doubles draws	(Germany) Tamara Korpatsch; 3–6, 6–2, 6–2	Anna Blinkova	(Spain) Cristina Bucșa (Austria) Julia Grabher	Erika Andreeva (Spain) Irene Burillo Escorihuela (France) Elsa Jacquemot (Belgium) Ysaline Bonaventure
March 21	Le Havre, France; Clay (indoor); W25; Singles and doubles draws	(Spain) Cristina Bucșa (Spain) Georgina García Pérez; 6–4, 6–3	(Latvia) Diāna Marcinkēviča (United States) Chiara Scholl	(Spain) Cristina Bucșa (Austria) Julia Grabher	Erika Andreeva (Spain) Irene Burillo Escorihuela (France) Elsa Jacquemot (Belgium) Ysaline Bonaventure
March 21	Sharm El Sheikh, Egypt; Hard; W15; Singles and doubles draws	Mariia Tkacheva; 6–4, 6–2	(China) Liu Fangzhou	(Czech Republic) Dominika Šalková (Czech Republic) Linda Klimovičová	(United States) Dasha Ivanova (United Kingdom) Anna Brogan (Switzerland) Bojana Klincov (Hong Kong) Wu Ho-ching
March 21	Sharm El Sheikh, Egypt; Hard; W15; Singles and doubles draws	(United States) Dasha Ivanova (Netherlands) Stéphanie Visscher; 6–7^{(8–10)}, 7–6^{(8–6)}, [10–7]	(South Korea) Jeong Bo-young (South Korea) Lee Eun-hye	(Czech Republic) Dominika Šalková (Czech Republic) Linda Klimovičová	(United States) Dasha Ivanova (United Kingdom) Anna Brogan (Switzerland) Bojana Klincov (Hong Kong) Wu Ho-ching
March 21	Marrakesh, Morocco; Clay; W15; Singles and doubles draws	(Spain) Carlota Martínez Círez; 6–2, 6–0	(Germany) Chantal Sauvant	(United States) Clervie Ngounoue (Italy) Sofia Rocchetti	(Italy) Federica Arcidiacono (Italy) Melania Delai (Sweden) Kajsa Rinaldo Persson (Bulgaria) Julia Stamatova
March 21	Marrakesh, Morocco; Clay; W15; Singles and doubles draws	(Switzerland) Naïma Karamoko (Portugal) Inês Murta; 6–2, 6–4	(Italy) Melania Delai (Slovenia) Pia Lovrič	(United States) Clervie Ngounoue (Italy) Sofia Rocchetti	(Italy) Federica Arcidiacono (Italy) Melania Delai (Sweden) Kajsa Rinaldo Persson (Bulgaria) Julia Stamatova
March 21	Palma Nova, Spain; Clay; W15; Singles and doubles draws	(Spain) Jéssica Bouzas Maneiro; 6–4, 6–1	(Spain) Yvonne Cavallé Reimers	(Spain) Claudia Hoste Ferrer (Spain) Guiomar Maristany	(Germany) Katharina Hering (Romania) Miriam Bulgaru (Malta) Francesca Curmi (Spain) Lucía Cortez Llorca
March 21	Palma Nova, Spain; Clay; W15; Singles and doubles draws	(Italy) Angelica Moratelli (Italy) Aurora Zantedeschi; 7–5, 6–2	(Romania) Bianca Elena Bărbulescu (Romania) Briana Szabó	(Spain) Claudia Hoste Ferrer (Spain) Guiomar Maristany	(Germany) Katharina Hering (Romania) Miriam Bulgaru (Malta) Francesca Curmi (Spain) Lucía Cortez Llorca
March 21	Monastir, Tunisia; Hard; W15; Singles and doubles draws	(Japan) Sakura Hosogi; 3–6, 6–2, 6–1	(Germany) Emily Welker	(United Kingdom) Eliz Maloney (France) Julie Belgraver	(United States) Lauren Proctor (Netherlands) Anouk Koevermans (Austria) Arabella Koller (Belgium) Eliessa Vanlangendonck
March 21	Monastir, Tunisia; Hard; W15; Singles and doubles draws	(Lithuania) Andrė Lukošiūtė (United Kingdom) Eliz Maloney; Walkover	(China) Lu Jingjing (China) Wang Meiling	(United Kingdom) Eliz Maloney (France) Julie Belgraver	(United States) Lauren Proctor (Netherlands) Anouk Koevermans (Austria) Arabella Koller (Belgium) Eliessa Vanlangendonck
March 21	Antalya, Turkey; Clay; W15; Singles and doubles draws	(Italy) Lisa Pigato; 6–2, 3–6, 3–1, ret.	(Turkey) İlay Yörük	Daria Lodikova (Hungary) Amarissa Kiara Tóth	(Romania) Cristina Dinu (Croatia) Mariana Dražić (Japan) Naho Sato (Greece) Sapfo Sakellaridi
March 21	Antalya, Turkey; Clay; W15; Singles and doubles draws	Ksenia Laskutova (Hungary) Amarissa Kiara Tóth; 7–6^{(7–4)}, 1–6, [10–7]	(Greece) Sapfo Sakellaridi; Anastasia Zolotareva	Daria Lodikova (Hungary) Amarissa Kiara Tóth	(Romania) Cristina Dinu (Croatia) Mariana Dražić (Japan) Naho Sato (Greece) Sapfo Sakellaridi
March 28	ACT Clay Court International; Canberra, Australia; Clay; W60; Singles – Doubles	(South Korea) Jang Su-jeong; 6–7^{(3–7)}, 6–1, 6–4	(Japan) Yuki Naito	(Mexico) Fernanda Contreras (Australia) Olivia Gadecki	(Japan) Moyuka Uchijima (China) Lu Jiajing (Australia) Destanee Aiava (India) Ankita Raina
March 28	ACT Clay Court International; Canberra, Australia; Clay; W60; Singles – Doubles	(India) Ankita Raina (Australia) Arina Rodionova; 4–6, 6–2, [11–9]	(Mexico) Fernanda Contreras (Australia) Alana Parnaby	(Mexico) Fernanda Contreras (Australia) Olivia Gadecki	(Japan) Moyuka Uchijima (China) Lu Jiajing (Australia) Destanee Aiava (India) Ankita Raina
March 28	Open de Seine-et-Marne; Croissy-Beaubourg, France; Hard (indoor); W60; Singles – Doubles	(Czech Republic) Linda Nosková; 6–3, 6–4	(France) Léolia Jeanjean	(France) Chloé Paquet (Liechtenstein) Kathinka von Deichmann	(Belgium) Ysaline Bonaventure (France) Elsa Jacquemot (Ukraine) Daria Snigur (Spain) Cristina Bucșa
March 28	Open de Seine-et-Marne; Croissy-Beaubourg, France; Hard (indoor); W60; Singles – Doubles	(Netherlands) Isabelle Haverlag (Lithuania) Justina Mikulskytė; 6–4, 6–2	Sofya Lansere; Oksana Selekhmeteva	(France) Chloé Paquet (Liechtenstein) Kathinka von Deichmann	(Belgium) Ysaline Bonaventure (France) Elsa Jacquemot (Ukraine) Daria Snigur (Spain) Cristina Bucșa
March 28	Tuks International; Pretoria, South Africa; Hard; W60; Singles – Doubles	Anastasia Tikhonova; 5–7, 6–3, 6–3	(Israel) Lina Glushko	(United Kingdom) Yuriko Miyazaki (Switzerland) Joanne Züger	(France) Tessah Andrianjafitrimo (France) Carole Monnet (Netherlands) Richèl Hogenkamp; Valeria Savinykh
March 28	Tuks International; Pretoria, South Africa; Hard; W60; Singles – Doubles	(Hong Kong) Eudice Chong (Hong Kong) Cody Wong; 7–5, 5–7, [13–11]	(Hungary) Tímea Babos; Valeria Savinykh	(United Kingdom) Yuriko Miyazaki (Switzerland) Joanne Züger	(France) Tessah Andrianjafitrimo (France) Carole Monnet (Netherlands) Richèl Hogenkamp; Valeria Savinykh
March 28	Sharm El Sheikh, Egypt; Hard; W15; Singles and doubles draws	(Chinese Taipei) Lee Pei-chi; 6–4, 6–7^{(6–8)}, 6–3	(Chinese Taipei) Lee Ya-hsuan	(Czech Republic) Linda Klimovičová (Mexico) María Fernanda Navarro	(Japan) Hiromi Abe (Kazakhstan) Gozal Ainitdinova (United States) Dasha Ivanova (United States) Sara Daavettila
March 28	Sharm El Sheikh, Egypt; Hard; W15; Singles and doubles draws	(Czech Republic) Linda Klimovičová (Czech Republic) Dominika Šalková; 6–1, 6–4	(Japan) Mei Hasegawa (Japan) Saki Imamura	(Czech Republic) Linda Klimovičová (Mexico) María Fernanda Navarro	(Japan) Hiromi Abe (Kazakhstan) Gozal Ainitdinova (United States) Dasha Ivanova (United States) Sara Daavettila
March 28	Monastir, Tunisia; Hard; W15; Singles and doubles draws	(Japan) Sakura Hosogi; 6–4, 1–6, 6–3	(Chinese Taipei) Joanna Garland	(Poland) Weronika Falkowska (France) Yasmine Mansouri	(Netherlands) Jasmijn Gimbrère (China) Wang Meiling (Japan) Anri Nagata (France) Evita Ramirez
March 28	Monastir, Tunisia; Hard; W15; Singles and doubles draws	(France) Yasmine Mansouri (France) Nina Radovanovic; 7–5, 6–3	(China) Wang Meiling (China) Yao Xinxin	(Poland) Weronika Falkowska (France) Yasmine Mansouri	(Netherlands) Jasmijn Gimbrère (China) Wang Meiling (Japan) Anri Nagata (France) Evita Ramirez
March 28	Antalya, Turkey; Clay; W15; Singles and doubles draws	(Greece) Sapfo Sakellaridi; 6–4, 6–3	(Italy) Deborah Chiesa	(Italy) Lisa Pigato (Ukraine) Anastasiya Soboleva	(Japan) Rina Saigo (Romania) Anca Todoni (Turkey) Ayla Aksu (Serbia) Dejana Radanović
March 28	Antalya, Turkey; Clay; W15; Singles and doubles draws	Vlada Koval; Daria Lodikova; 6–4, 3–6, [10–4]	Julia Avdeeva (Greece) Sapfo Sakellaridi	(Italy) Lisa Pigato (Ukraine) Anastasiya Soboleva	(Japan) Rina Saigo (Romania) Anca Todoni (Turkey) Ayla Aksu (Serbia) Dejana Radanović
