= 2023 ACT Clay Court International 2 – Doubles =

Doubles
- 2023 ACT Clay Court International 2

Final
- Champions: (Japan) Erina Hayashi (Japan) Yuki Naito
- Runners-up: (Australia) Destanee Aiava (Australia) Olivia Gadecki
- Score: 7–6^{(7–2)}, 7–5

Events
Singles	Doubles
← 2022 ·	ACT Clay Court International	· 2024 →

Ankita Raina and Arina Rodionova were the defending champions but chose not to participate.

Erina Hayashi and Yuki Naito won the title, defeating Destanee Aiava and Olivia Gadecki in the final, 7–6^{(7–2)}, 7–5.

== Seeds ==
1. (United Kingdom) Naiktha Bains / (Chinese Taipei) Liang En-shuo (semifinals)
2. (Australia) Destanee Aiava / (Australia) Olivia Gadecki (final)
3. (Australia) Elysia Bolton / (Australia) Alexandra Bozovic (first round)
4. (Australia) Jaimee Fourlis / (Australia) Alana Parnaby (quarterfinals, withdrew)

== Draw ==
=== Key ===
- Q = Qualifier
- WC = Wild card
- LL = Lucky loser
- Alt = Alternate
- SE = Special exempt
- PR = Protected ranking
- ITF = ITF entry
- JE = Junior exempt
- w/o = Walkover
- r = Retired
- d = Defaulted
- SR = Special ranking

First round
1	(United Kingdom) N Bains (Chinese Taipei) E-s Liang	6	6
(Thailand) P Kovapitukted (Chinese Taipei) Y-y Yang	1	1
WC	(Australia) I McLeod (Australia) A Narker	6^{10}	2
(Japan) H Kinoshita (Japan) S Saito	7^{12}	6
3	(Australia) E Bolton (Australia) A Bozovic	7	3	[8]
(Japan) E Hayashi (Japan) Y Naito	5	6	[10]
(Australia) M Adamczak (Australia) A Osborne	2	6^{2}
(Japan) M Kawamura (Japan) R Sawayanagi	6	7^{7}
(New Zealand) M Barry (France) I Ramialison	0	7^{9}	[5]
(Australia) M Inglis (Australia) K McPhee	6	6^{7}	[10]
(Australia) Z Larke (Australia) S Nayar	1	6	[1]
4	(Australia) J Fourlis (Australia) A Parnaby	6	2	[10]
(Australia) M Krish (Australia) B Thompson	6	6
(Australia) S McDonald (Australia) S Rokusek	1	4
(Australia) A Berezov (Australia) A Graovac	0	2
2	(Australia) D Aiava (Australia) O Gadecki	6	6

Quarterfinals
1	(United Kingdom) N Bains (Chinese Taipei) E-s Liang	6	2	[10]
(Japan) H Kinoshita (Japan) S Saito	1	6	[4]
(Japan) E Hayashi (Japan) Y Naito	6	5	[12]
(Japan) M Kawamura (Japan) R Sawayanagi	3	7	[10]
(Australia) M Inglis (Australia) K McPhee	w/o
4	(Australia) J Fourlis (Australia) A Parnaby
(Australia) M Krish (Australia) B Thompson	4	1
2	(Australia) D Aiava (Australia) O Gadecki	6	6

Semifinals
1	(United Kingdom) N Bains (Chinese Taipei) E-s Liang	4	6	[9]
(Japan) E Hayashi (Japan) Y Naito	6	4	[11]
(Australia) M Inglis (Australia) K McPhee	5	6	[6]
2	(Australia) D Aiava (Australia) O Gadecki	7	4	[10]

Final
(Japan) E Hayashi (Japan) Y Naito	7^{7}	7
2	(Australia) D Aiava (Australia) O Gadecki	6^{2}	5
