= 2022 ACT Clay Court International 2 =

Tennis tournament

- Date: 28 March–3 April 2022
- Edition: 8th
- Category: ITF Women's World Tennis Tour
- Prize money: $60,000
- Surface: Clay / Outdoor
- Location: Canberra, Australia

Champions

Singles
- (South Korea) Jang Su-jeong

Doubles
- (India) Ankita Raina / (Australia) Arina Rodionova
← 2019 ·	ACT Clay Court International	· 2023 →

The 2022 ACT Clay Court International 2 was a professional tennis tournament played on outdoor clay courts. It was the eighth edition of the tournament which was part of the 2022 ITF Women's World Tennis Tour. It took place in Canberra, Australia between 28 March and 3 April 2022.

== Singles main draw entrants ==
=== Seeds ===
Country	Player	Rank^{1}	Seed
ROU	Mihaela Buzărnescu	121	1
KOR	Jang Su-jeong	179	2
AUS	Arina Rodionova	182	3
JPN	Kurumi Nara	195	4
AUS	Ellen Perez	196	5
AUS	Olivia Gadecki	202	6
KOR	Han Na-lae	210	7
JPN	Yuki Naito	224	8

- ^{1} Rankings are as of 21 March 2022.

=== Other entrants ===
The following players received wildcards into the singles main draw:

- (Australia) Catherine Aulia
- (Australia) Kimberly Birrell
- (Australia) Talia Gibson
- (Australia) Zoe Hives

The following player received entry using a protected ranking:

- (India) Pranjala Yadlapalli

The following players received entry from the qualifying draw:

- (Australia) Destanee Aiava
- (India) Sowjanya Bavisetti
- (South Korea) Choi Ji-hee
- (Netherlands) Merel Hoedt
- (Australia) Charlotte Kempenaers-Pocz
- (Japan) Hiroko Kuwata
- (India) Ankita Raina
- (Japan) Erika Sema

The following player received entry as a lucky loser:

- (Australia) Alexandra Osborne

== Champions ==
=== Singles ===
- (South Korea) Jang Su-jeong def. (Japan) Yuki Naito, 6–7^{(3–7)}, 6–1, 6–4

=== Doubles ===
- (India) Ankita Raina / (Australia) Arina Rodionova def. (Mexico) Fernanda Contreras / (Australia) Alana Parnaby, 4–6, 6–2, [11–9]
