= 2020 ACT Clay Court International =

- Date: 16–22 March 2020
- Edition: 7th
- Category: ITF Women's World Tennis Tour
- Prize money: $60,000
- Surface: Clay
- Location: Canberra, Australia

2019 Champions

Singles
- (Australia) Destanee Aiava

Doubles
- (United Kingdom) Naiktha Bains / (Slovakia) Tereza Mihalíková
← 2019 ·	ACT Clay Court International	· 2021 →

The 2020 ACT Clay Court International was a professional tennis tournament played on outdoor clay courts. It was the seventh edition of the tournament which was part of the 2020 ITF Women's World Tennis Tour, and the first edition of the year with the 2020 ACT Clay Court International II being held the week after. It was originally scheduled to take place in Canberra, Australia between 16 and 22 March 2020 but was cancelled due to the coronavirus pandemic.
