= 2023 ACT Clay Court International 2 – Singles =

Singles
- 2023 ACT Clay Court International 2

Final
- Champion: (China) Wang Yafan
- Runner-up: (Australia) Olivia Gadecki
- Score: 3–6, 6–2, 6–0

Events
Singles	Doubles
← 2022 ·	ACT Clay Court International	· 2024 →

Jang Su-jeong was the defending champion but chose not to participate.

Wang Yafan won the title, defeating Olivia Gadecki in the final, 3–6, 6–2, 6–0.

== Seeds ==
1. (Australia) Olivia Gadecki (final)
2. (Australia) Jaimee Fourlis (second round)
3. (Australia) Priscilla Hon (first round)
4. (Slovenia) Dalila Jakupović (quarterfinals)
5. (Japan) Yuki Naito (second round)
6. (Chinese Taipei) Joanna Garland (withdrew)
7. (Japan) Himeno Sakatsume (semifinals)
8. (Australia) Alexandra Bozovic (first round)

== Draw ==
=== Key ===
- Q = Qualifier
- WC = Wild card
- LL = Lucky loser
- Alt = Alternate
- SE = Special exempt
- PR = Protected ranking
- ITF = ITF entry
- JE = Junior exempt
- w/o = Walkover
- r = Retired
- d = Defaulted
- SR = Special ranking

=== Finals ===
Semifinals
1	(Australia) Olivia Gadecki	6	2	6
7	(Japan) Himeno Sakatsume	2	6	4
(Australia) Petra Hule	5	0
Q	(China) Wang Yafan	7	6

Final
1	(Australia) Olivia Gadecki	6	2	0
Q	(China) Wang Yafan	3	6	6

=== Top half ===
First round
1	(Australia) O Gadecki	7^{7}	7^{7}
Q	(Australia) K McPhee	6^{3}	6^{2}
(France) I Ramialison	7^{7}	6
(Chinese Taipei) E-s Liang	6^{5}	3
Q	(Australia) S Nayar	2	0
(United Kingdom) N Bains	6	6
WC	(Australia) Z Larke	3	3
LL	(Chinese Taipei) Y-y Yang	6	6
3	(Australia) P Hon	7^{7}	6^{5}	6^{5}
(Australia) M Inglis	6^{2}	7^{7}	7^{7}
(Japan) N Hanatani	6	5	2
(Japan) H Kaji	4	7	6
(Japan) M Doi	6	6
Q	(New Zealand) M Barry	4	1
(Thailand) P Kovapitukted	1	2
7	(Japan) H Sakatsume	6	6

Second round
1	(Australia) O Gadecki	6	6^{5}	6
(France) I Ramialison	1	7^{7}	4
(United Kingdom) N Bains	4	7^{8}	6
LL	(Chinese Taipei) Y-y Yang	6	6^{6}	4
(Australia) M Inglis	6	5	6
(Japan) H Kaji	4	7	4
(Japan) M Doi	6	3	5
7	(Japan) H Sakatsume	4	6	7

Quarterfinals
1	(Australia) O Gadecki	6	6
(United Kingdom) N Bains	1	4
(Australia) M Inglis	7^{7}	5	5
7	(Japan) H Sakatsume	6^{4}	7	7

Semifinals
1	(Australia) O Gadecki	6	2	6
7	(Japan) H Sakatsume	2	6	4

=== Bottom half ===
First round
8	(Australia) A Bozovic	3	0
(Australia) P Hule	6	6
JE	(Japan) S Saito	6	6
(Japan) H Kuwata	1	3
Q	(Japan) M Kawamura	7^{12}	7
Q	(Japan) H Kinoshita	6^{10}	5
Q	(Japan) R Sawayanagi	2	2
4	(Slovenia) D Jakupović	6	6
5	(Japan) Y Naito	2	6	6
Q	(Australia) A Osborne	6	0	4
(Australia) A Parnaby	w/o
(Australia) E Bolton
(Japan) C Muramatsu	2	1
Q	(China) Y Wang	6	6
(Australia) D Aiava	3	3
2	(Australia) J Fourlis	6	6

Second round
(Australia) P Hule	6	6
JE	(Japan) S Saito	3	4
Q	(Japan) M Kawamura	2	4
4	(Slovenia) D Jakupović	6	6
5	(Japan) Y Naito	4	7	1
(Australia) A Parnaby	6	5	6
Q	(China) Y Wang	4	7	6
2	(Australia) J Fourlis	6	5	4

Quarterfinals
(Australia) P Hule	6	6
4	(Slovenia) D Jakupović	2	1
(Australia) A Parnaby	1	4
Q	(China) Y Wang	6	6

Semifinals
(Australia) P Hule	5	0
Q	(China) Y Wang	7	6
