= 2018 ACT Clay Court International =

- Date: 19–25 March
- Edition: 3rd
- Category: ITF Women's Circuit
- Prize money: $60,000
- Surface: Clay
- Location: Canberra, Australia

Champions

Singles
- (Slovenia) Dalila Jakupović

Doubles
- (Australia) Priscilla Hon / (Slovenia) Dalila Jakupović
← 2016 ·	ACT Clay Court International	· 2019 →

The 2018 ACT Clay Court International was a professional tennis tournament played on outdoor clay courts. It was the third edition of the tournament and part of the 2018 ITF Women's Circuit. It took place in Canberra, Australia, on 19–25 March 2018. It was the first of two tournaments held back-to-back at the same location.

== Singles main draw entrants ==
=== Seeds ===
Country	Player	Rank^{1}	Seed
JPN	Nao Hibino	121	1
JPN	Miyu Kato	139	2
JPN	Risa Ozaki	155	3
AUS	Lizette Cabrera	156	4
SLO	Dalila Jakupović	171	5
JPN	Eri Hozumi	180	6
GBR	Gabriella Taylor	192	7
AUS	Priscilla Hon	194	8

- ^{1} Rankings as of 5 March 2018.

=== Other entrants ===
The following players received a wildcard into the singles main draw:

- (Australia) Masa Jovanovic
- (Australia) Genevieve Lorbergs
- (Australia) Ivana Popovic
- (Australia) Alicia Smith

The following players received entry from the qualifying draw:

- (Australia) Maddison Inglis
- (Australia) Kaylah McPhee
- (Australia) Abbie Myers
- (Japan) Ramu Ueda

== Champions ==
=== Singles ===
- (Slovenia) Dalila Jakupović def. (Australia) Destanee Aiava 6–4, 6–4

=== Doubles ===
- (Australia) Priscilla Hon / (Slovenia) Dalila Jakupović def. (Japan) Miyu Kato / (Japan) Makoto Ninomiya 6–4, 4–6, [10–7]
