= 2023 ACT Clay Court International 2 =

Tennis tournament

- Date: 20–26 March 2023
- Edition: 10th
- Category: ITF Women's World Tennis Tour
- Prize money: $60,000
- Surface: Clay / Outdoor
- Location: Canberra, Australia

Champions

Singles
- (China) Wang Yafan

Doubles
- (Japan) Erina Hayashi / (Japan) Yuki Naito
← 2022 ·	ACT Clay Court International	· 2024 →

The 2023 ACT Clay Court International 2 was a professional tennis tournament played on outdoor clay courts. It was the tenth edition of the tournament, which was part of the 2023 ITF Women's World Tennis Tour. It took place in Canberra, Australia, between 20 and 26 March 2023.

== Champions ==
=== Singles ===
- (China) Wang Yafan def. (Australia) Olivia Gadecki, 3–6, 6–2, 6–0

=== Doubles ===
- (Japan) Erina Hayashi / (Japan) Yuki Naito def. (Australia) Destanee Aiava / (Australia) Olivia Gadecki, 7–6^{(7–2)}, 7–5

== Singles main draw entrants ==
=== Seeds ===
Country	Player	Rank	Seed
AUS	Olivia Gadecki	144	1
AUS	Jaimee Fourlis	152	2
AUS	Priscilla Hon	189	3
SLO	Dalila Jakupović	243	4
JPN	Yuki Naito	248	5
~~TPE~~	~~Joanna Garland~~	~~269~~	~~6~~
JPN	Himeno Sakatsume	277	7
AUS	Alexandra Bozovic	294	8

- Rankings are as of 6 March 2023.

=== Other entrants ===
The following player received a wildcard into the singles main draw:

- (Australia) Zara Larke

The following player received entry into the singles main draw using a junior exempt:

- (Japan) Sara Saito

The following players received entry from the qualifying draw:

- (New Zealand) Monique Barry
- (Japan) Mana Kawamura
- (Japan) Hayu Kinoshita
- (Australia) Kaylah McPhee
- (Australia) Sara Nayar
- (Australia) Alexandra Osborne
- (Japan) Riko Sawayanagi
- (China) Wang Yafna

The following player received entry as a lucky loser:

- (Chinese Taipei) Yang Ya-yi
