= 2022 ACT Clay Court International 2 – Singles =

Singles
- 2022 ACT Clay Court International 2

Final
- Champion: (South Korea) Jang Su-jeong
- Runner-up: (Japan) Yuki Naito
- Score: 6–7^{(3–7)}, 6–1, 6–4

Events
Singles	Doubles
← 2019 ·	ACT Clay Court International	· 2023 →

Olivia Rogowska was the defending champion but chose not to participate.

Jang Su-jeong won the title, defeating Yuki Naito in the final, 6–7^{(3–7)}, 6–1, 6–4.

== Seeds ==
1. (Romania) Mihaela Buzărnescu (first round)
2. (South Korea) Jang Su-jeong (champion)
3. (Australia) Arina Rodionova (second round)
4. (Japan) Kurumi Nara (second round, retired)
5. (Australia) Ellen Perez (first round)
6. (Australia) Olivia Gadecki (semifinals)
7. (South Korea) Han Na-lae (second round)
8. (Japan) Yuki Naito (final)

== Draw ==
=== Key ===
- Q = Qualifier
- WC = Wild card
- LL = Lucky loser
- Alt = Alternate
- SE = Special exempt
- PR = Protected ranking
- ITF = ITF entry
- JE = Junior exempt
- w/o = Walkover
- r = Retired
- d = Defaulted
- SR = Special ranking

=== Finals ===
Semifinals
(Mexico) Fernanda Contreras	4	4
8	(Japan) Yuki Naito	6	6
6	(Australia) Olivia Gadecki	6^{0}	5
2	(South Korea) Jang Su-jeong	7^{7}	7

Final
8	(Japan) Yuki Naito	7^{7}	1	4
2	(South Korea) Jang Su-jeong	6^{3}	6	6

=== Top half ===
First round
1	(Romania) M Buzărnescu	4	2
(United Kingdom) N Bains	6	6
(Mexico) F Contreras	6	6
(Australia) P Hon	4	1
(Japan) M Uchijima	2	6	6
(Australia) J Fourlis	6	4	3
Q	(Australia) C Kempenaers-Pocz	7^{10}	6
5	(Australia) E Perez	6^{8}	3
4	(Japan) K Nara	6	6
WC	(Australia) C Aulia	4	0
(China) Jia Lu	7^{11}	4	6
WC	(Australia) K Birrell	6^{9}	6	3
(Japan) K Okamura	3	7^{7}	3
WC	(Australia) T Gibson	6	6^{2}	6
PR	(India) P Yadlapalli	0	4
8	(Japan) Y Naito	6	6

Second round
(United Kingdom) N Bains	6	3	4
(Mexico) F Contreras	4	6	6
(Japan) M Uchijima	7^{7}	6
Q	(Australia) C Kempenaers-Pocz	6^{5}	3
4	(Japan) K Nara	6	3	1^{r}
(China) Jia Lu	2	6	2
WC	(Australia) T Gibson	1	4
8	(Japan) Y Naito	6	6

Quarterfinals
(Mexico) F Contreras	6	6
(Japan) M Uchijima	4	0
(China) Jia Lu	1	1
8	(Japan) Y Naito	6	6

Semifinals
(Mexico) F Contreras	4	4
8	(Japan) Y Naito	6	6

=== Bottom half ===
First round
6	(Australia) O Gadecki	6	6
LL	(Australia) A Osborne	3	3
Q	(Japan) E Sema	1	2
Q	(South Korea) J-h Choi	6	6
Q	(Australia) D Aiava	6	6
(Japan) C Muramatsu	2	1
(Japan) A Omae	3	3
3	(Australia) Ar Rodionova	6	6
7	(South Korea) N-l Han	6	6
Q	(Netherlands) M Hoedt	4	4
(United States) K Day	2	3
Q	(India) A Raina	6	6
WC	(Australia) Z Hives	6	4	0^{r}
Q	(India) S Bavisetti	2	6	1
Q	(Japan) H Kuwata	1	4
2	(South Korea) S-j Jang	6	6

Second round
6	(Australia) O Gadecki	6	6
Q	(South Korea) J-h Choi	2	4
Q	(Australia) D Aiava	2	6	7^{7}
3	(Australia) Ar Rodionova	6	2	6^{4}
7	(South Korea) N-l Han	3	4
Q	(India) A Raina	6	6
Q	(India) S Bavisetti	1	2
2	(South Korea) S-j Jang	6	6

Quarterfinals
6	(Australia) O Gadecki	6	0
Q	(Australia) D Aiava	2	0^{r}
Q	(India) A Raina	5	3
2	(South Korea) S-j Jang	7	6

Semifinals
6	(Australia) O Gadecki	6^{0}	5
2	(South Korea) S-j Jang	7^{7}	7
