= 2022 ACT Clay Court International 2 – Doubles =

Doubles
- 2022 ACT Clay Court International 2

Final
- Champions: (India) Ankita Raina (Australia) Arina Rodionova
- Runners-up: (Mexico) Fernanda Contreras (Australia) Alana Parnaby
- Score: 4–6, 6–2, [11–9]

Events
Singles	Doubles
← 2019 ·	ACT Clay Court International	· 2023 →

Alison Bai and Jaimee Fourlis were the defending champions but Fourlis chose not to participate. Bai partnered alongside Alexandra Osborne but lost in the quarterfinals to Kimberly Birrell and Priscilla Hon.

Ankita Raina and Arina Rodionova won the title, defeating Fernanda Contreras and Alana Parnaby in the final, 4–6, 6–2, [11–9].

== Seeds ==
1. (India) Ankita Raina / (Australia) Arina Rodionova (champions)
2. (Indonesia) Beatrice Gumulya / (Indonesia) Jessy Rompies (quarterfinals)
3. (Australia) Destanee Aiava / (Australia) Olivia Tjandramulia (semifinals, withdrew)
4. (South Korea) Choi Ji-hee / (Japan) Kyōka Okamura (first round)

== Draw ==
=== Key ===
- Q = Qualifier
- WC = Wild card
- LL = Lucky loser
- Alt = Alternate
- SE = Special exempt
- PR = Protected ranking
- ITF = ITF entry
- JE = Junior exempt
- w/o = Walkover
- r = Retired
- d = Defaulted
- SR = Special ranking

=== Draw ===
First round
1	(India) A Raina (Australia) Ar Rodionova	6	6
(Australia) C Kempenaers-Pocz (Australia) T Preston	4	4
(United Kingdom) N Bains (Japan) Y Naito	6	6
(Australia) C Aulia (Australia) T Gibson	3	3
3	(Australia) D Aiava (Australia) O Tjandramulia	6	6
(Australia) I Bozicevic (Australia) E Micic	4	2
(Netherlands) M Hoedt (Ukraine) M Zakarlyuk	0	0
(China) Jia Lu (Japan) A Omae	6	6
(Australia) K Birrell (Australia) P Hon	4	6	[10]
(Japan) M Matsuda (Japan) C Muramatsu	6	3	[8]
(Australia) A Bai (Australia) A Osborne	7^{7}	6
4	(South Korea) J-h Choi (Japan) K Okamura	6^{4}	4
(Australia) G Da Silva-Fick (Australia) TN Smith	4	7^{9}	[8]
(Mexico) F Contreras (Australia) A Parnaby	6	6^{7}	[10]
(Australia) A Bozovic (Australia) O Gadecki	3	4
2	(Indonesia) B Gumulya (Indonesia) J Rompies	6	6

Quarterfinals
1	(India) A Raina (Australia) Ar Rodionova	6^{2}	6	[10]
(United Kingdom) N Bains (Japan) Y Naito	7^{7}	3	[7]
3	(Australia) D Aiava (Australia) O Tjandramulia	7^{7}	6
(China) Jia Lu (Japan) A Omae	6^{5}	0
(Australia) K Birrell (Australia) P Hon	6	6
(Australia) A Bai (Australia) A Osborne	3	4
(Mexico) F Contreras (Australia) A Parnaby	6	6
2	(Indonesia) B Gumulya (Indonesia) J Rompies	1	0

Semifinals
1	(India) A Raina (Australia) Ar Rodionova	w/o
3	(Australia) D Aiava (Australia) O Tjandramulia
(Australia) K Birrell (Australia) P Hon	4	0
(Mexico) F Contreras (Australia) A Parnaby	6	6

Final
1	(India) A Raina (Australia) Ar Rodionova	4	6	[11]
(Mexico) F Contreras (Australia) A Parnaby	6	2	[9]
