= 2018 ACT Clay Court International – Doubles =

Doubles
- 2018 ACT Clay Court International

Final
- Champions: (Australia) Priscilla Hon (Slovenia) Dalila Jakupović
- Runners-up: (Japan) Miyu Kato (Japan) Makoto Ninomiya
- Score: 6–4, 4–6, [10–7]

Events
Singles	Doubles
← 2016 ·	ACT Clay Court International	· 2019 →

Ashleigh Barty and Arina Rodionova were the defending champions, having won the previous edition in 2016, however both players chose to participate at the 2018 Miami Open instead.

Priscilla Hon and Dalila Jakupović won the title, defeating Miyu Kato and Makoto Ninomiya in the final, 6–4, 4–6, [10–7].

== Seeds ==
1. (Japan) Miyu Kato / (Japan) Makoto Ninomiya (final)
2. (Japan) Nao Hibino / (Japan) Eri Hozumi (quarterfinals)
3. (Australia) Priscilla Hon / (Slovenia) Dalila Jakupović (champions)
4. (Australia) Jessica Moore / (Australia) Ellen Perez (semifinals)

== Draw ==
=== Key ===
- Q = Qualifier
- WC = Wild card
- LL = Lucky loser
- Alt = Alternate
- SE = Special exempt
- PR = Protected ranking
- ITF = ITF entry
- JE = Junior exempt
- w/o = Walkover
- r = Retired
- d = Defaulted
- SR = Special ranking

=== Draw ===
First round
1	(Japan) M Kato (Japan) M Ninomiya	1	6	[10]
(Australia) A Bai (Australia) Z Hives	6	3	[6]
Q	(Australia) E James (Australia) A Svinos	4	2
(Australia) N Bains (Switzerland) K Kennel	6	6
4	(Australia) J Moore (Australia) E Perez	6	6
(Austria) P König (Japan) R Ueda	3	2
(Japan) N Hanatani (Australia) M Jovanovic	6	3	[10]
Q	(Romania) I Fetecău (Australia) J Stojanovic	2	6	[7]
(Australia) A Myers (Australia) A Smith	2	6	[5]
(France) S Reix (Australia) O Tjandramulia	6	3	[10]
(Australia) M Inglis (Australia) G Lorbergs	0	7	[6]
3	(Australia) P Hon (Slovenia) D Jakupović	6	5	[10]
(Australia) D Aiava (Australia) A Bozovic	6	6
(United Kingdom) K Dunne (Japan) M Ozeki	3	2
(Australia) K Birrell (Australia) J Fourlis	0	4
2	(Japan) N Hibino (Japan) E Hozumi	6	6

Quarterfinals
1	(Japan) M Kato (Japan) M Ninomiya	6	6
(Australia) N Bains (Switzerland) K Kennel	4	1
4	(Australia) J Moore (Australia) E Perez	6	6^{2}	[10]
(Japan) N Hanatani (Australia) M Jovanovic	1	7^{7}	[6]
(France) S Reix (Australia) O Tjandramulia	2	6	[6]
3	(Australia) P Hon (Slovenia) D Jakupović	6	4	[10]
(Australia) D Aiava (Australia) A Bozovic	1	6	[10]
2	(Japan) N Hibino (Japan) E Hozumi	6	2	[7]

Semifinals
1	(Japan) M Kato (Japan) M Ninomiya	6	6
4	(Australia) J Moore (Australia) E Perez	2	4
3	(Australia) P Hon (Slovenia) D Jakupović	6	6
(Australia) D Aiava (Australia) A Bozovic	4	4

Final
1	(Japan) M Kato (Japan) M Ninomiya	4	6	[7]
3	(Australia) P Hon (Slovenia) D Jakupović	6	4	[10]
