= 2018 ACT Clay Court International – Singles =

Singles
- 2018 ACT Clay Court International

Final
- Champion: (Slovenia) Dalila Jakupović
- Runner-up: (Australia) Destanee Aiava
- Score: 6–4, 6–4

Events
Singles	Doubles
← 2016 ·	ACT Clay Court International	· 2019 →

Eri Hozumi was the defending champion, having won the previous edition in 2016, however she lost in the second round to Shérazad Reix.

Dalila Jakupović won the title after defeating Destanee Aiava 6–4, 6–4 in the final.

== Seeds ==
1. (Japan) Nao Hibino (second round)
2. (Japan) Miyu Kato (semifinals)
3. (Japan) Risa Ozaki (first round)
4. (Australia) Lizette Cabrera (quarterfinals)
5. (Slovenia) Dalila Jakupović (champion)
6. (Japan) Eri Hozumi (second round)
7. (United Kingdom) Gabriella Taylor (semifinals)
8. (Australia) Priscilla Hon (second round)

== Draw ==
=== Key ===
- Q = Qualifier
- WC = Wild card
- LL = Lucky loser
- Alt = Alternate
- SE = Special exempt
- PR = Protected ranking
- ITF = ITF entry
- JE = Junior exempt
- w/o = Walkover
- r = Retired
- d = Defaulted
- SR = Special ranking

=== Finals ===
Semifinals
7	(United Kingdom) Gabriella Taylor	2	2
5	(Slovenia) Dalila Jakupović	6	6
(Australia) Destanee Aiava	6	6
2	(Japan) Miyu Kato	3	3

Final
5	(Slovenia) Dalila Jakupović	6	6
(Australia) Destanee Aiava	4	4

=== Top half ===
First round
1	(Japan) N Hibino	7^{7}	6
(Australia) J Moore	6^{5}	3
Q	(Japan) R Ueda	6	2	4
Q	(Australia) A Myers	3	6	6
WC	(Australia) I Popovic	1	1
(China) Jia Lu	6	6
(Australia) A Bozovic	3	3
7	(United Kingdom) G Taylor	6	6
4	(Australia) L Cabrera	6	7
(Switzerland) K Kennel	1	5
WC	(Australia) G Lorbergs	3	2
Q	(Australia) K McPhee	6	6
(Japan) N Hanatani	7^{7}	4	6
WC	(Australia) A Smith	6^{5}	6	1
Q	(Australia) M Inglis	1	2
5	(Slovenia) D Jakupović	6	6

Second round
1	(Japan) N Hibino	4	6	3
Q	(Australia) A Myers	6	1	6
(China) Jia Lu	3	3
7	(United Kingdom) G Taylor	6	6
4	(Australia) L Cabrera	7^{8}	3	6
Q	(Australia) K McPhee	6^{6}	6	1
(Japan) N Hanatani	0	1
5	(Slovenia) D Jakupović	6	6

Quarterfinals
Q	(Australia) A Myers	4	6^{8}
7	(United Kingdom) G Taylor	6	7^{10}
4	(Australia) L Cabrera	2	2
5	(Slovenia) D Jakupović	6	6

Semifinals
7	(United Kingdom) G Taylor	2	2
5	(Slovenia) D Jakupović	6	6

=== Bottom half ===
First round
6	(Japan) E Hozumi	7^{7}	6
(Australia) N Bains	6^{4}	3
WC	(Australia) M Jovanovic	1	2
(France) S Reix	6	6
(Australia) K Birrell	2	1
(Australia) D Aiava	6	6
(Australia) J Fourlis	6	6
3	(Japan) R Ozaki	2	1
8	(Australia) P Hon	6	6
(United Kingdom) K Dunne	0	1
(Australia) A Bai	7^{7}	3	1
(Australia) E Perez	6^{4}	6	6
(Australia) O Tjandramulia	2	6	2
(Romania) I Fetecău	6	3	6
(Australia) Z Hives	6	6^{5}	3
2	(Japan) M Kato	2	7^{7}	6

Second round
6	(Japan) E Hozumi	6^{4}	6	4
(France) S Reix	7^{7}	3	6
(Australia) D Aiava	4	6	6
(Australia) J Fourlis	6	3	4
8	(Australia) P Hon	6	5	4
(Australia) E Perez	4	7	6
(Romania) I Fetecău	0	3
2	(Japan) M Kato	6	6

Quarterfinals
(France) S Reix	4	2
(Australia) D Aiava	6	6
(Australia) E Perez	0	1
2	(Japan) M Kato	6	6

Semifinals
(Australia) D Aiava	6	6
2	(Japan) M Kato	3	3
