= 2022 Arcadia Women's Pro Open – Singles =

Singles
- 2022 Arcadia Women's Pro Open

Final
- Champion: (Canada) Rebecca Marino
- Runner-up: (United States) Alycia Parks
- Score: 7–6^{(7–0)}, 6–1

Events
Singles	Doubles
Arcadia Women's Pro Open	· 2023 →

This was the first edition of the tournament.

Rebecca Marino won the title, defeating Alycia Parks in the final, 7–6^{(7–0)}, 6–1.

== Seeds ==
1. (France) Chloé Paquet (semifinals)
2. (Australia) Maddison Inglis (second round)
3. (United Kingdom) Harriet Dart (first round)
4. (Serbia) Aleksandra Krunić (second round)
5. (Canada) Rebecca Marino (champion)
6. (United States) Katie Volynets (second round)
7. (United States) Robin Anderson (first round)
8. (Netherlands) Arianne Hartono (first round)

== Draw ==
=== Key ===
- Q = Qualifier
- WC = Wild card
- LL = Lucky loser
- Alt = Alternate
- SE = Special exempt
- PR = Protected ranking
- ITF = ITF entry
- JE = Junior exempt
- w/o = Walkover
- r = Retired
- d = Defaulted
- SR = Special ranking

=== Finals ===
Semifinals
1	(France) Chloé Paquet	6^{6}	6	2
(United States) Alycia Parks	7^{8}	0	6
Q	(United States) Ellie Douglas	3	2
5	(Canada) Rebecca Marino	6	6

Final
(United States) Alycia Parks	6^{0}	1
5	(Canada) Rebecca Marino	7^{7}	6

=== Top half ===
First round
1	(France) C Paquet	6	6
(United States) S Chang	4	4
Q	(Japan) E Shibahara	6	6
Q	(United States) R Brantmeier	3	4
Q	(United States) Q Gleason	2	0
(United States) E Bektas	6	6
(United States) C Dolehide	6	6
7	(United States) R Anderson	4	4
3	(United Kingdom) H Dart	6^{1}	3
WC	(United States) L Hovde	7^{7}	6
Q	(United States) A Krueger	3	2
Q	(United States) K Day	6	6
Q	(United States) M Manasse	3	6^{3}
(United States) A Parks	6	7^{7}
(Switzerland) L Sun	4	2
6	(United States) K Volynets	6	6

Second round
1	(France) C Paquet	4	6	6
Q	(Japan) E Shibahara	6	4	1
(United States) E Bektas	7^{10}	3	2
(United States) C Dolehide	6^{8}	6	6
WC	(United States) L Hovde	6	6
Q	(United States) K Day	3	2
(United States) A Parks	5	6	6
6	(United States) K Volynets	7	3	3

Quarterfinals
1	(France) C Paquet	6	6
(United States) C Dolehide	2	3
WC	(United States) L Hovde	3	7^{7}	2
(United States) A Parks	6	6^{4}	6

Semifinals
1	(France) C Paquet	6^{6}	6	2
(United States) A Parks	7^{8}	0	6

=== Bottom half ===
First round
8	(Netherlands) A Hartono	3	4
PR	(Australia) P Hon	6	6
(United States) F Di Lorenzo	4	2
WC	(United States) R Kingsley	6	6
Q	(United States) E Douglas	6	6
WC	(United States) K Codd	3	3
(United States) G Min	5	3
4	(Serbia) A Krunić	7	6
5	(Canada) R Marino	6	6
JE	(Czech Republic) L Fruhvirtová	2	4
(United States) J Loeb	6^{3}	6^{7}
Q	(United States) R Montgomery	7^{7}	7^{9}
(Switzerland) L Küng	2	6	3
PR	(United States) L Chirico	6	4	6
WC	(United States) E Kalieva	1	1
2	(Australia) M Inglis	6	6

Second round
PR	(Australia) P Hon	7^{7}	6
WC	(United States) R Kingsley	6^{5}	2
Q	(United States) E Douglas	6	6
4	(Serbia) A Krunić	2	1
5	(Canada) R Marino	6	6
Q	(United States) R Montgomery	4	3
PR	(United States) L Chirico	6	7
2	(Australia) M Inglis	3	5

Quarterfinals
PR	(Australia) P Hon	2	2
Q	(United States) E Douglas	6	6
5	(Canada) R Marino	6	6
PR	(United States) L Chirico	2	4

Semifinals
Q	(United States) E Douglas	3	2
5	(Canada) R Marino	6	6
