= 2022 Arcadia Women's Pro Open – Doubles =

Doubles
- 2022 Arcadia Women's Pro Open

Final
- Champions: (United States) Ashlyn Krueger (United States) Robin Montgomery
- Runners-up: (United Kingdom) Harriet Dart (Mexico) Giuliana Olmos
- Score: Walkover

Events
Singles	Doubles
Arcadia Women's Pro Open	· 2023 →

This was the first edition of the tournament.

Ashlyn Krueger and Robin Montgomery won the title after Harriet Dart and Giuliana Olmos withdrew before the final.

== Seeds ==
1. (Slovakia) Tereza Mihalíková / (Czech Republic) Květa Peschke (first round)
2. (United Kingdom) Harriet Dart / (Mexico) Giuliana Olmos (final, withdrew)
3. (United States) Emina Bektas / (United Kingdom) Tara Moore (semifinals)
4. (United States) Robin Anderson / (Netherlands) Arianne Hartono (quarterfinals)

== Draw ==
=== Key ===
- Q = Qualifier
- WC = Wild card
- LL = Lucky loser
- Alt = Alternate
- SE = Special exempt
- PR = Protected ranking
- ITF = ITF entry
- JE = Junior exempt
- w/o = Walkover
- r = Retired
- d = Defaulted
- SR = Special ranking

=== Draw ===
First round
1	(Slovakia) T Mihalíková (Czech Republic) K Peschke	4	6	[8]
(Czech Republic) L Fruhvirtová (Canada) R Marino	6	1	[10]
(United States) R Brantmeier (United States) E Kalieva	2	6	[8]
(United States) F Di Lorenzo (United States) K Volynets	6	3	[10]
4	(United States) R Anderson (Netherlands) A Hartono	6	6
(Latvia) L Dekmeijere (United States) T Kinard	0	1
(United States) S Chang (United States) A Kulikov	6	5	[4]
(United States) A Krueger (United States) R Montgomery	2	7	[10]
(United States) K Day (Switzerland) L Küng	6	6
WC	(United States) B Boren (United States) S Lee	1	3
WC	(United States) T Driscoll (United States) K Hui	6^{3}	3
3	(United States) E Bektas (United Kingdom) T Moore	7^{7}	6
(France) T Fiquet (United States) S León	3	0
(United States) Q Gleason (United States) M Manasse	6	6
(United States) H Giavara (Japan) A Okuno	3	6	[6]
2	(United Kingdom) H Dart (Mexico) G Olmos	6	3	[10]

Quarterfinals
(Czech Republic) L Fruhvirtová (Canada) R Marino	w/o
(United States) F Di Lorenzo (United States) K Volynets
4	(United States) R Anderson (Netherlands) A Hartono	4	2
(United States) A Krueger (United States) R Montgomery	6	6
(United States) K Day (Switzerland) L Küng
3	(United States) E Bektas (United Kingdom) T Moore	w/o
(United States) Q Gleason (United States) M Manasse	2	5
2	(United Kingdom) H Dart (Mexico) G Olmos	6	7

Semifinals
(Czech Republic) L Fruhvirtová (Canada) R Marino	2	6	[9]
(United States) A Krueger (United States) R Montgomery	6	3	[11]
3	(United States) E Bektas (United Kingdom) T Moore	7^{7}	1	[6]
2	(United Kingdom) H Dart (Mexico) G Olmos	6^{5}	6	[10]

Final
(United States) A Krueger (United States) R Montgomery	w/o
2	(United Kingdom) H Dart (Mexico) G Olmos
