= 2022 Arcadia Women's Pro Open =

Tennis tournament

- Date: 28 February–6 March 2022
- Edition: 1st
- Category: ITF Women's World Tennis Tour
- Prize money: $60,000
- Surface: Hard / Outdoor
- Location: Arcadia, California, United States

Champions

Singles
- (Canada) Rebecca Marino

Doubles
- (United States) Ashlyn Krueger / (United States) Robin Montgomery
- Arcadia Women's Pro Open

The 2022 Arcadia Women's Pro Open was a professional tennis tournament played on outdoor hard courts. It was the first edition of the tournament which was part of the 2022 ITF Women's World Tennis Tour. It took place in Arcadia, California, United States between 28 February and 6 March 2022.

== Singles main-draw entrants ==
=== Seeds ===
Country	Player	Rank^{1}	Seed
FRA	Chloé Paquet	118	1
AUS	Maddison Inglis	123	2
GBR	Harriet Dart	124	3
SRB	Aleksandra Krunić	125	4
CAN	Rebecca Marino	153	5
USA	Katie Volynets	155	6
USA	Robin Anderson	168	7
NED	Arianne Hartono	171	8

- ^{1} Rankings are as of 21 February 2022.

=== Other entrants ===
The following players received wildcards into the singles main draw:

- (United States) Katie Codd
- (United States) Liv Hovde
- (United States) Elvina Kalieva
- (United States) Raveena Kingsley

The following players received entry using protected rankings:

- (United States) Louisa Chirico
- (Australia) Priscilla Hon

The following player received entry using a junior exempt:

- (Czech Republic) Linda Fruhvirtová

The following players received entry from the qualifying draw:

- (United States) Reese Brantmeier
- (United States) Kayla Day
- (United States) Ellie Douglas
- (United States) Quinn Gleason
- (United States) Ashlyn Krueger
- (United States) Maegan Manasse
- (United States) Robin Montgomery
- (Japan) Ena Shibahara

== Champions ==
=== Singles ===
- (Canada) Rebecca Marino def. (United States) Alycia Parks, 7–6^{(7–0)}, 6–1

=== Doubles ===
- (United States) Ashlyn Krueger / (United States) Robin Montgomery def. (United Kingdom) Harriet Dart / (Mexico) Giuliana Olmos, walkover
