= Fernanda Contreras Gómez =

Mexican tennis player (born 1997)

Fernanda Contreras
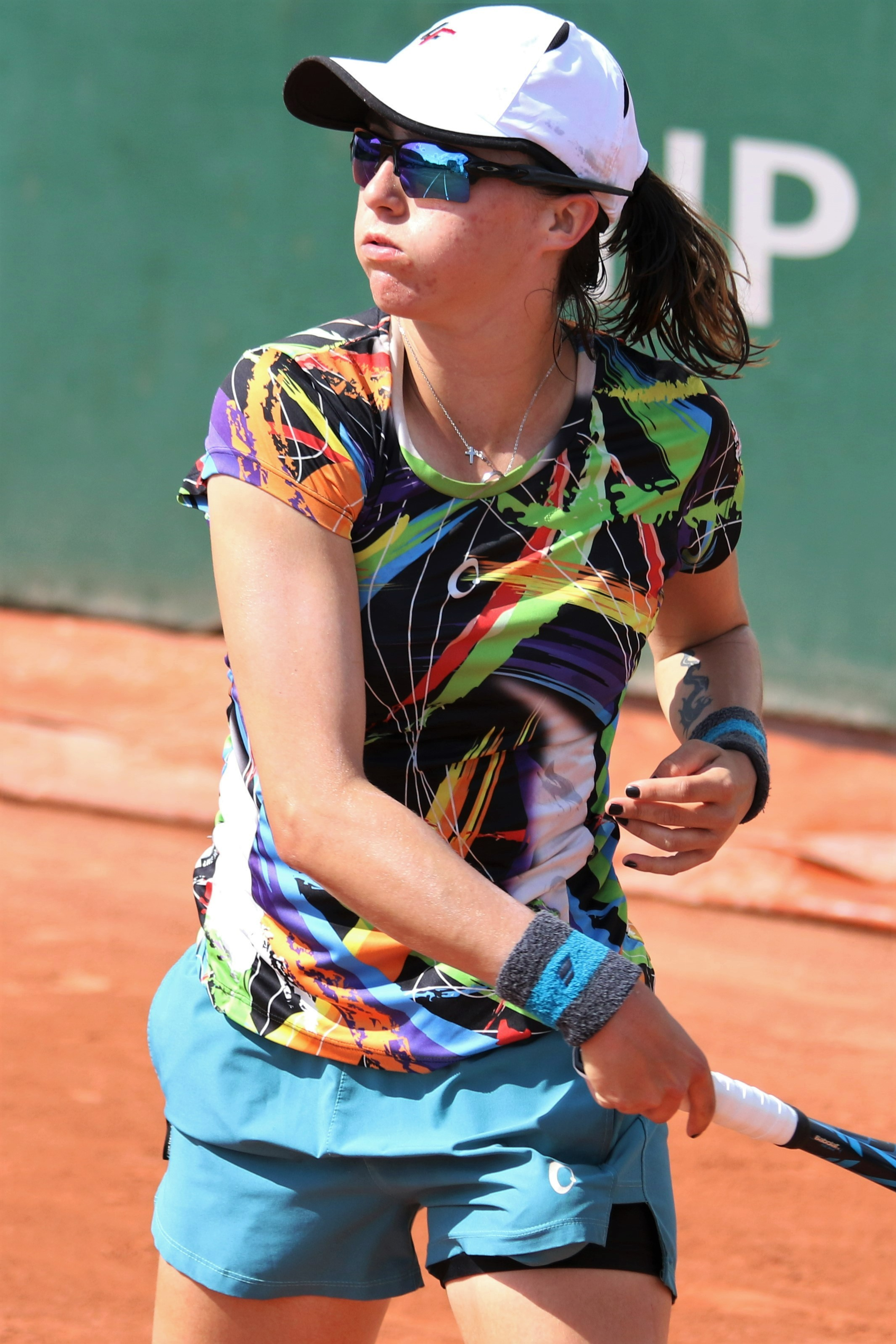
- Contreras at the 2022 French Open
- Full name: Fernanda Contreras Gómez
- Country (sports): Mexico
- Born: 8 October 1997 (age 29) San Luis Potosi, Mexico
- Height: 1.70 m (5 ft 7 in)
- Turned pro: 2019
- Retired: 2026
- Plays: Right (one-handed backhand)
- College: Vanderbilt University
- Coach: Christo Van Rensburg
- Prize money: US$ 466,254

Singles
- Career record: 114–96
- Career titles: 2 ITF
- Highest ranking: No. 139 (3 October 2022)

Grand Slam singles results
- Australian Open: Q1 (2023)
- French Open: 2R (2022)
- Wimbledon: 1R (2022)
- US Open: 1R (2022)

Doubles
- Career record: 93–57
- Career titles: 9 ITF
- Highest ranking: No. 99 (8 May 2023)

Team competitions
- Fed Cup: 16–4

Fernanda Contreras Gómez (born 8 October 1997) is a Mexican former professional tennis player. She achieved her career-high singles ranking by the WTA of 139 on 3 October 2022. She also has a best doubles ranking of world No. 99, achieved on 8 May 2023. Contreras played collegiately for Vanderbilt University.

== Career ==
=== College years ===
As a junior at Vanderbilt, Contreras won the USTA/ITA All-American Intercollegiate Championship to become Vanderbilt's first Riviera/ITA Singles Tournament Champion on 8 October 2017. She defeated Aliona Bolsova in the championship match.

Contreras finished the season with a 44–10 record, setting the program record for most victories in a season, and was named singles and doubles All-American. She reached the semifinals of the Oracle ITA Fall National Championships and the semifinals in the NCAA singles draw. Contreras ended her collegiate career with the most wins in Commodore history with 138 career wins.

=== 2018–2020: Professional beginnings ===
She made her debut for the Mexico Fed Cup team in 2018, winning all three matches she played.

Contreras also participated in the 2018 Central American and Caribbean Games with partner Giuliana Olmos taking gold in doubles and silver in team. She lost to reigning Olympic champion Monica Puig in singles before defeating Team Puerto Rico in doubles with Giuliana Olmos for the gold medal.

In February 2020, Contreras participated in the 2020 Fed Cup Americas Zone Group I – Play-offs, representing Mexico. After defeating Peru, Mexico beat Team Chile in the semifinals, squaring off to face Paraguay in the finals. Mexico defeated Paraguay 2–1 securing their spot in the Fed Cup World Group Qualifiers. For her performance, Contreras was awarded the Fed Cup 2020 Americas Heart Award.

=== 2022: Major & WTA 1000 debuts and first wins, top 150 in singles ===
At the French Open, Contreras qualified for the main draw to make her Grand Slam tournament debut. She defeated Panna Udvardy in the first round, before losing to 20th seed Daria Kasatkina.

She qualified for her second and third major in a row at Wimbledon and the US Open.

At the Pan Pacific Open, Contreras earned her first main-draw qualification in a WTA Tour event and defeated former top-10 player Sofia Kenin. As a result, she reached the top 150, at No. 141 climbing 41 positions in the rankings.

She made her WTA 1000 debut at the 2022 Guadalajara Akron as a wildcard, losing to Ajla Tomljanović in the first round.

=== 2023: WTA Tour final & top 100 in doubles ===
Ranked No. 143 in doubles, Contreras reached her first WTA Tour doubles final at the 2023 Monterrey Open, partnering Kimberly Birrell, after the pair received a wildcard. As a result, she reached the top 100 in the doubles rankings.

Contreras received a main draw wildcard for the WTA 1000 Miami Open. Initially, she was entered in the qualifying draw, but after withdrawals, Emma Raducanu entered the main draw with her own ranking instead of as a wildcard, and Contreras was promoted to the main draw, given a wildcard.

=== 2026: Retirement ===
Contreras Gómez announced her retirement from professional tennis in February 2026.

== Personal life ==
Contreras was born in San Luis Potosí, Mexico and grew up in Austin, Texas, where she attended Westlake High School.

Contreras graduated from Vanderbilt University in May 2019 with a degree in mechanical engineering. Her grandfather Francisco Contreras Serrano was a Davis Cup member, a Pan American Games medalist and a Wimbledon semifinalist in mixed doubles.

== Performance timeline ==
Key
W	F	SF	QF	#R	RR	Q#	P#	DNQ	A	Z#	PO	G	S	B	NMS	NTI	P	NH

(W) winner; (F) finalist; (SF) semifinalist; (QF) quarterfinalist; (#R) rounds 4, 3, 2, 1; (RR) round-robin stage; (Q#) qualification round; (P#) preliminary round; (DNQ) did not qualify; (A) absent; (Z#) Davis/Fed Cup Zonal Group (with number indication) or (PO) play-off; (G) gold, (S) silver or (B) bronze Olympic/Paralympic medal; (NMS) not a Masters tournament; (NTI) not a Tier I tournament; (P) postponed; (NH) not held; (SR) strike rate (events won / competed); (W–L) win–loss record.
To avoid confusion and double counting, these charts are updated at the conclusion of a tournament or when the player's participation has ended.

Only main-draw results in WTA Tour, Grand Slam tournaments, Fed Cup/Billie Jean King Cup and Olympic Games are included in win–loss records.

=== Singles ===
Current through the 2023 China Open.

Tournament	2020	2021	2022	2023	SR	W–L	Win %
Grand Slam tournaments
Australian Open	A	A	A	Q1	0 / 0	0–0	
French Open	A	A	2R	Q1	0 / 1	1–1	
Wimbledon	NH	A	1R	Q1	0 / 1	0–1	
US Open	A	A	1R	A	0 / 1	0–1	
Win–loss	0–0	0–0	1–3	0–0	0 / 3	1–3	
WTA 1000 tournaments
Qatar Open	A	NTI	A	NTI	0 / 0	0–0	
Dubai Championships	NTI	A	NTI	A	0 / 0	0–0	
Indian Wells Open	NH	A	A	A	0 / 0	0–0	
Miami Open	NH	A	A	1R	0 / 1	0–1	
Madrid Open	NH	A	A	A	0 / 0	0–0	
Italian Open	A	A	A	A	0 / 0	0–0	
Canadian Open	NH	A	A	A	0 / 0	0–0	
Cincinnati Open	A	A	A	A	0 / 0	0–0	
China Open	Not Held			A	0 / 0	0–0	
Wuhan Open	Not Held				0 / 0	0–0	
Guadalajara Open	Not Held		1R	A	0 / 1	0–1	
Career statistics
	2020	2021	2022	2023	SR	W–L	Win %
Tournaments	0 (Note: During the season, she did not play in the main-draw of any WTA Tour-level tournaments. However, she played at the Billie Jean King Cup that is not counted as a played tournament but matches counted.)	0	5	2	Career total: 7		
Titles	0	0	0	0	Career total: 0		
Finals	0	0	0	0	Career total: 0		
Hard win–loss	0–0	0–0	1–3	0–2	0 / 5	1–5	
Clay win–loss	1–0	0–0	1–1	0–1	0 / 2	2–2	
Grass win–loss	0–0	0–0	0–1	0–0	0 / 1	0–1	
Overall win–loss	1–0	0–0	2–5	0–3	0 / 8	3–8	
Year-end ranking	464	276	160	355	$338,495		

== WTA Tour finals ==
=== Doubles: 1 (runner-up) ===
Legend WTA 250 (0–1)	Finals by surface Hard (0–1)

Result	Date	Tournament	Tier	Surface	Partner	Opponents	Score
Loss	Mar 2023	Monterrey Open, Mexico	WTA 250	Hard	(Australia) Kimberly Birrell	(Colombia) Yuliana Lizarazo (Colombia) María Paulina Pérez	3–6, 7–5, [5–10]

== ITF Circuit finals ==
=== Singles: 4 (2 titles, 2 runner-ups) ===
Legend W25 tournaments (1–1) W15 tournaments (1–1)	Finals by surface Hard (2–1) Clay (0–1)

Result	W–L	Date	Tournament	Tier	Surface	Opponent	Score
Loss	0–1	Jun 2019	ITF Cancún, Mexico	W15	Hard	(Romania) Patricia Maria Tig	0–6, 0–6
Win	1–1	Aug 2019	ITF Cancún, Mexico	W15	Hard	(United Kingdom) Aleksandra Pitak	6–3, 6–3
Win	2–1	Oct 2019	Waco Showdown, United States	W25	Hard	(Canada) Leylah Fernandez	6–3, 2–6, 6–1
Loss	2–2	Jun 2021	ITF Sumter, United States	W25	Clay	(United States) Peyton Stearns	1–6, 2–6

=== Doubles: 13 (9 titles, 4 runner-ups) ===
Legend W100 tournaments (0–1) W60 tournaments (3–2) W25 tournaments (4–0) W15 tournaments (2–1)	Finals by surface Hard (5–2) Clay (4–1) Grass (0–1)

Result	W–L	Date	Tournament	Tier	Surface	Partner	Opponents	Score
Win	1–0	Jun 2019	ITF Cancún, Mexico	W15	Hard	(Mexico) Jessica Hinojosa Gómez	(Argentina) Melany Krywoj (Chile) Fernanda Labraña	2–6, 6–4, [10–7]
Win	2–0	Jun 2019	ITF Cancún, Mexico	W15	Hard	(Mexico) Nazari Urbina	(France) Tiphanie Fiquet (Poland) Daria Kuczer	3–6, 6–4, [10–3]
Loss	2–1	Aug 2019	ITF Cancún, Mexico	W15	Hard	(Mexico) Ana-Paula de la Pena	(Japan) Haine Ogata (Japan) Aiko Yoshitomi	4–6, 4–6
Win	3–1	Sep 2019	ITF Pula, Italy	W25	Clay	(United States) Chiara Scholl	(Italy) Monica Cappelletti (Italy) Melania Delai	6–4, 6–1
Win	4–1	May 2021	ITF Pelham, United States	25,000	Clay	(Mexico) Marcela Zacarías	(Japan) Erina Hayashi (Japan) Kanako Morisaki	6–0, 6–3
Win	5–1	Jan 2022	Bendigo International, Australia	W60+H	Hard	(United States) Alycia Parks	(Australia) Alison Bai (Australia) Alana Parnaby	6–3, 6–1
Win	6–1	Jan 2022	ITF Manacor, Spain	W25	Hard	(Spain) Andrea Lázaro García	(Slovakia) Tereza Mihalíková (Czech Republic) Linda Nosková	6–1, 6–4
Win	7–1	Feb 2022	ITF Manacor, Spain	W25	Hard	(Spain) Andrea Lázaro García	(Slovakia) Tereza Mihalíková (Czech Republic) Linda Nosková	6–1, 3–6, [10–6]
Loss	7–2	Apr 2022	Clay Court International, Australia	W60	Clay	(Australia) Alana Parnaby	(India) Ankita Raina (Australia) Arina Rodionova	6–4, 2–6, [9–11]
Win	8–2	May 2022	Open Saint-Gaudens, France	W60	Clay	(Switzerland) Lulu Sun	(Greece) Valentini Grammatikopoulou (Russia) Anastasia Tikhonova	7–5, 6–2
Loss	8–3	Jun 2022	Surbiton Trophy, United Kingdom	W100	Grass	(United States) Catherine Harrison	(United States) Ingrid Neel (Netherlands) Rosalie van der Hoek	3–6, 3–6
Win	9–3	Apr 2023	Oerias Open, Portugal	W60	Clay	(Brazil) Ingrid Martins	(Czech Republic) Jesika Malečková (Czech Republic) Renata Voráčová	6–3, 6–2
Loss	9–4	Oct 2023	Georgia's Rome Open, United States	W60	Hard (i)	(United States) Robin Anderson	(United States) Sofia Sewing (Russia) Anastasia Tikhonova	6–4, 3–6, [7–10]
