= ACT Clay Court International =

- 2023 ACT Clay Court International 2

Defunct tennis tournament
- Location: Canberra, Australia
- Venue: Canberra Tennis Centre
- Category: ITF Women's Circuit
- Surface: Clay
- Draw: 32S/32Q/16D
- Prize money: $60,000
- Website: www.tennis.com.au

The ACT Clay Court International were two back-to-back tournaments for professional female tennis players played on outdoor clay courts. The events were classified as $60,000 ITF Women's Circuit tournaments and were held in Canberra, Australia, from 2016 until 2023.

For the historical winners of this event see the ACT Open played at the Canberra Tennis Center from 1929 to 2006.

== Past finals ==
=== Singles ===
Year	Champion	Runner-up	Score
2023 (2)	(China) Wang Yafan	(Australia) Olivia Gadecki	3–6, 6–2, 6–0
2023 (1)	(Australia) Priscilla Hon	(Australia) Olivia Gadecki	4–6, 6–2, 6–4
2022 (2)	(South Korea) Jang Su-jeong	(Japan) Yuki Naito	6–7^{(3–7)}, 6–1, 6–4
2022 (1)	(Japan) Moyuka Uchijima	(Australia) Olivia Gadecki	6–2, 6–2
2020–21	Tournaments cancelled due to the coronavirus pandemic		
2019 (2)	(Australia) Olivia Rogowska	(Australia) Priscilla Hon	7–6^{(8–6)}, 6–3
2019 (1)	(Australia) Destanee Aiava	(Japan) Risa Ozaki	6–2, 6–2
2018 (2)	(Australia) Jaimee Fourlis	(Australia) Ellen Perez	6–3, 6–2
2018 (1)	(Slovenia) Dalila Jakupović	(Australia) Destanee Aiava	6–4, 6–4
2017	Not held		
2016 (2)	(Japan) Miyu Kato	(Hungary) Anna Bondár	6–4, 7–6^{(7–3)}
2016 (1)	(Japan) Eri Hozumi	(Australia) Destanee Aiava	6–3, 3–6, 7–6^{(7–3)}

=== Doubles ===
Year	Champions	Runners-up	Score
2023 (2)	(Japan) Erina Hayashi (Japan) Yuki Naito	(Australia) Destanee Aiava (Australia) Olivia Gadecki	7–6^{(7–2)}, 7–5
2023 (1)	(Australia) Elysia Bolton (Australia) Alexandra Bozovic	(Australia) Priscilla Hon (Slovenia) Dalila Jakupović	4–6, 7–5, [13–11]
2022 (2)	(India) Ankita Raina (Australia) Arina Rodionova	(Mexico) Fernanda Contreras (Australia) Alana Parnaby	4–6, 6–2, [11–9]
2022 (1)	(South Korea) Han Na-lae (South Korea) Jang Su-jeong	(Japan) Yuki Naito (Japan) Moyuka Uchijima	3–6, 6–2, [10–5]
2020–21	Tournaments cancelled due to the coronavirus pandemic		
2019 (2)	(Australia) Alison Bai (Australia) Jaimee Fourlis	(Australia) Naiktha Bains (Slovakia) Tereza Mihalíková	6–2, 6–2
2019 (1)	(Australia) Naiktha Bains (Slovakia) Tereza Mihalíková	(Australia) Destanee Aiava (Australia) Ellen Perez	4–6, 6–2, [10–4]
2018 (2)	(Romania) Irina Fetecău (Australia) Kaylah McPhee	(Austria) Pia König (Japan) Michika Ozeki	6–1, 4–6, [10–5]
2018 (1)	(Australia) Priscilla Hon (Slovenia) Dalila Jakupović	(Japan) Miyu Kato (Japan) Makoto Ninomiya	6–4, 4–6, [10–7]
2017	Not held		
2016 (2)	(Australia) Ashleigh Barty (Australia) Arina Rodionova	(Japan) Eri Hozumi (Japan) Miyu Kato	5–7, 6–3, [10–7]
2016 (1)	(Australia) Ashleigh Barty (Australia) Arina Rodionova	(Japan) Kanae Hisami (Thailand) Varatchaya Wongteanchai	6–4, 6–2
