= Alana Parnaby =

Australian tennis player (born 1994)

- Country (sports): Australia
- Born: 15 September 1994 (age 31)
- Retired: 2025
- Plays: Right (two-handed both sides)
- Coach: Adrian Muscillo
- Prize money: $103,449

Singles
- Career record: 182–209
- Career titles: 0
- Highest ranking: No. 428 (22 May 2023)

Doubles
- Career record: 153–168
- Career titles: 8 ITF
- Highest ranking: No. 201 (28 November 2022)

Grand Slam mixed doubles results
- Australian Open: 2R (2023)

Alana Parnaby (born 15 September 1994) is an Australian former tennis player.

Parnaby has a career-high singles ranking by the Women's Tennis Association (WTA) of 428, reached on 22 May 2023, and a best doubles ranking of No. 201, achieved on 28 November 2022. She won eight doubles titles on the ITF Women's Circuit.

Parnaby made her WTA Tour main-draw debut at the 2022 Sydney International in the doubles draw, where she partnered with Gabriella Da Silva-Fick.

Parnaby is studying a Bachelor of Sport Development at Deakin University.

== ITF Circuit finals ==
=== Doubles: 21 (8 titles, 13 runner-ups) ===
Legend W60/75 tournaments (0–4) W50 tournaments (1–0) W25/35 tournaments (6–8) W10 tournaments (1–1)	Finals by surface Hard (6–8) Clay (1–3) Grass (1–1) Carpet (0–1)

Result	W–L	Date	Tournament	Tier	Surface	Partner	Opponents	Score
Win	1–0	Jul 2016	ITF Hong Kong, China	W10	Hard	(Japan) Nagi Hanatani	(China) Gai Ao (China) Zhang Ying	6–4, 4–6, [13–11]
Loss	1–1	Aug 2016	ITF Oldenzaal, Netherlands	W10	Clay	(Germany) Lisa-Marie Mätschke	(Belgium) Déborah Kerfs (United States) Chiara Scholl	3–6, 4–6
Win	2–1	Mar 2019	ITF Mildura, Australia	W25	Grass	(Australia) Alicia Smith	(Australia) Olivia Rogowska (Australia) Storm Sanders	3–6, 6–3, [10–8]
Loss	2–2	Jan 2022	Bendigo International, Australia	W60+H	Hard	(Australia) Alison Bai	(Mexico) Fernanda Contreras (United States) Alycia Parks	3–6, 1–6
Loss	2–3	Mar 2022	ITF Bendigo, Australia	W25	Hard	(Australia) Gabriella Da Silva-Fick	(Australia) Jaimee Fourlis (Australia) Ellen Perez	1–6, 1–6
Loss	2–4	Apr 2022	Clay Court International, Australia	W60	Clay	(Mexico) Fernanda Contreras	(India) Ankita Raina (Australia) Arina Rodionova	6–4, 2–6, [9–11]
Win	3–4	May 2022	ITF Nottingham, UK	W25	Grass	(Japan) Mana Ayukawa	(Hong Kong) Eudice Chong (Hong Kong) Cody Wong	7–5, 6–4
Loss	3–5	May 2022	ITF Montemor-o-Novo, Portugal	W25	Hard	(India) Prarthana Thombare	(Portugal) Francisca Jorge (Portugal) Matilde Jorge	3–6, 4–6
Loss	3–6	Jul 2022	ITF Porto, Portugal	W25	Hard	(China) Lu Jiajing	(Chinese Taipei) Lee Ya-hsuan (Chinese Taipei) Wu Fang-hsien	7–5, 4–6, [1–10]
Loss	3–7	Jul 2022	ITF Horb, Germany	W25	Clay	(Australia) Jaimee Fourlis	Ekaterina Makarova; Ekaterina Reyngold	6–2, 4–6, [8–10]
Loss	3–8	Oct 2022	ITF Cairns, Australia	W25	Hard	(Australia) Taylah Preston	(Australia) Talia Gibson (Australia) Petra Hule	1–6, 4–6
Win	4–8	Nov 2022	ITF Traralgon, Australia	W25	Hard	(United Kingdom) Naiktha Bains	(Japan) Haruna Arakawa (Japan) Natsuho Arakawa	7–6^{(4)}, 6–2
Loss	4–9	May 2023	Fukuoka International, Japan	W60	Carpet	(China) Ma Yexin	(United States) Emina Bektas (Israel) Lina Glushko	5–7, 3–6
Win	5–9	Jul 2023	ITF Darmstadt, Germany	W25	Clay	(Czech Republic) Michaela Bayerlová	(Romania) Arina Vasilescu; Anastasia Zolotareva	7–5, 6–4
Loss	5–10	Dec 2023	ITF Papamoa, New Zealand	W25	Hard	(Czech Republic) Michaela Bayerlová	(Japan) Mio Mushika (Japan) Hikaru Sato	4–6, 7–5, [8–10]
Loss	5–11	Feb 2024	Burnie International, Australia	W75	Hard	(China) Ma Yexin	(China) Tang Qianhui (China) You Xiaodi	4–6, 5–7
Loss	5–12	Mar 2024	ITF Swan Hill, Australia	W35	Grass	(New Zealand) Monique Barry	(Japan) Sakura Hosogi (Japan) Misaki Matsuda	2–6, 2–6
Win	6–12	Jun 2024	ITF Montemor-o-Novo, Portugal	W50	Hard	(Australia) Elena Micic	(Hong Kong) Eudice Chong (Italy) Lucrezia Musetti	7–6^{(6)}, 6–4
Loss	6–13	Jun 2024	ITF Tauste, Spain	W35+H	Hard	(Mexico) Victoria Rodríguez	(India) Rutuja Bhosale (China) Tian Fangran	2–6, 4–6
Win	7–13	Sep 2024	ITF Cairns, Australia	W35	Hard (i)	(Australia) Petra Hule	(United States) Mia Horvit (Australia) Tenika McGiffin	6–2, 6–2
Win	8–13	Oct 2024	ITF Cairns, Australia	W35	Hard	(Australia) Petra Hule	(Australia) Destanee Aiava (Australia) Alexandra Bozovic	3–6, 6–2, [10–2]
