= 2023 ITF Women's World Tennis Tour (January–March) =

The 2023 ITF Women's World Tennis Tour is the 2023 edition of the second-tier tour for women's professional tennis. It is organised by the International Tennis Federation and is a tier below the WTA Tour. The ITF Women's World Tennis Tour includes tournaments in six categories with prize money ranging from $15,000 up to $100,000.

== Key ==
Category
W100 tournaments
W80 tournaments
W60 tournaments
W40 tournaments
W25 tournaments
W15 tournaments

== Month ==
=== January ===
Week of	Tournament	Winner	Runners-up	Semifinalists	Quarterfinalists
January 2	Canberra Tennis International; Canberra, Australia; Hard; W60; Singles – Doubles	(United Kingdom) Katie Boulter; 3–6, 6–3, 6–2	(United Kingdom) Jodie Burrage	(United States) Hailey Baptiste (Ukraine) Lesia Tsurenko	(United Kingdom) Heather Watson (Australia) Astra Sharma (Japan) Mai Hontama (Germany) Eva Lys
January 2	Canberra Tennis International; Canberra, Australia; Hard; W60; Singles – Doubles	Irina Khromacheva; Anastasia Tikhonova; 6–4, 7–5	(United States) Robin Anderson (United States) Hailey Baptiste	(United States) Hailey Baptiste (Ukraine) Lesia Tsurenko	(United Kingdom) Heather Watson (Australia) Astra Sharma (Japan) Mai Hontama (Germany) Eva Lys
January 2	Nonthaburi, Thailand; Hard; W40; Singles and doubles draws	(Ukraine) Kateryna Volodko; 6–2, 6–3	Valeria Savinykh	(Thailand) Lanlana Tararudee (Thailand) Peangtarn Plipuech	(Thailand) Anchisa Chanta (Slovenia) Dalila Jakupović (Turkey) Çağla Büyükakçay (Czech Republic) Gabriela Knutson
January 2	Nonthaburi, Thailand; Hard; W40; Singles and doubles draws	(Chinese Taipei) Liang En-shuo (China) Ma Yexin; 6–0, 6–3	(Japan) Hiroko Kuwata (Ukraine) Kateryna Volodko	(Thailand) Lanlana Tararudee (Thailand) Peangtarn Plipuech	(Thailand) Anchisa Chanta (Slovenia) Dalila Jakupović (Turkey) Çağla Büyükakçay (Czech Republic) Gabriela Knutson
January 2	Monastir, Tunisia; Hard; W25; Singles and doubles draws	(France) Océane Dodin; 6–1, 6–1	Kristina Dmitruk	(Burundi) Sada Nahimana; Maria Timofeeva	(France) Alice Tubello (Serbia) Lola Radivojević; Iryna Shymanovich (Romania) Andreea Prisăcariu
January 2	Monastir, Tunisia; Hard; W25; Singles and doubles draws	Kristina Dmitruk; Iryna Shymanovich; 6–1, 6–2	(Germany) Kathleen Kanev (Switzerland) Arlinda Rushiti	(Burundi) Sada Nahimana; Maria Timofeeva	(France) Alice Tubello (Serbia) Lola Radivojević; Iryna Shymanovich (Romania) Andreea Prisăcariu
January 2	Malibu, United States; Hard; W25; Singles and doubles draws	(United States) Jamie Loeb; 6–4, 6–1	(Mexico) Renata Zarazúa	(United States) Emina Bektas (United States) Vivian Wolff	(United States) Hanna Chang (Canada) Marina Stakusic (Switzerland) Lulu Sun (United States) Eryn Cayetano
January 2	Malibu, United States; Hard; W25; Singles and doubles draws	All doubles competition was cancelled due to poor weather		(United States) Emina Bektas (United States) Vivian Wolff	(United States) Hanna Chang (Canada) Marina Stakusic (Switzerland) Lulu Sun (United States) Eryn Cayetano
January 9	Tallinn, Estonia; Hard (i); W40; Singles and doubles draws	(Belgium) Yanina Wickmayer; 6–1, 2–0 ret.	(North Macedonia) Lina Gjorcheska	(Turkey) Zeynep Sönmez (Turkey) Berfu Cengiz	(Netherlands) Lesley Pattinama Kerkhove (Italy) Deborah Chiesa (France) Alice Robbe (Croatia) Tena Lukas
January 9	Tallinn, Estonia; Hard (i); W40; Singles and doubles draws	(Czech Republic) Lucie Havlíčková (Czech Republic) Dominika Šalková; 7–5, 4–6, [13–11]	(Italy) Deborah Chiesa (Italy) Lisa Pigato	(Turkey) Zeynep Sönmez (Turkey) Berfu Cengiz	(Netherlands) Lesley Pattinama Kerkhove (Italy) Deborah Chiesa (France) Alice Robbe (Croatia) Tena Lukas
January 9	Nonthaburi, Thailand; Hard; W40; Singles and doubles draws	(Thailand) Lanlana Tararudee; 2–6, 6–1, 6–0	(Thailand) Mananchaya Sawangkaew	(Finland) Anastasia Kulikova (Thailand) Anchisa Chanta	(Turkey) Çağla Büyükakçay (Japan) Haruka Kaji (Thailand) Patcharin Cheapchandej (Slovenia) Dalila Jakupović
January 9	Nonthaburi, Thailand; Hard; W40; Singles and doubles draws	(Chinese Taipei) Liang En-shuo (China) Ma Yexin; 6–3, 2–6, [10–6]	(Chinese Taipei) Lee Pei-chi (Indonesia) Jessy Rompies	(Finland) Anastasia Kulikova (Thailand) Anchisa Chanta	(Turkey) Çağla Büyükakçay (Japan) Haruka Kaji (Thailand) Patcharin Cheapchandej (Slovenia) Dalila Jakupović
January 9	Monastir, Tunisia; Hard; W40; Singles and doubles draws	Maria Timofeeva; 7–5, 6–4	(Japan) Sakura Hosogi	(France) Océane Dodin (Romania) Georgia Crăciun	(France) Alice Tubello; Iryna Shymanovich; Anastasia Zolotareva; Tatiana Prozorova
January 9	Monastir, Tunisia; Hard; W40; Singles and doubles draws	Alena Fomina-Klotz; Iryna Shymanovich; 6–2, 6–1	(Romania) Oana Gavrilă (Greece) Sapfo Sakellaridi	(France) Océane Dodin (Romania) Georgia Crăciun	(France) Alice Tubello; Iryna Shymanovich; Anastasia Zolotareva; Tatiana Prozorova
January 9	Buenos Aires, Argentina; Clay; W25; Singles and doubles draws	(Italy) Nuria Brancaccio; 6–4, 4–6, 7–5	(Argentina) Julia Riera	(Slovenia) Pia Lovrič (Belgium) Sofia Costoulas	(Argentina) Martina Capurro Taborda (Serbia) Tijana Sretenović (Spain) Carlota Martínez Círez; Amina Anshba
January 9	Buenos Aires, Argentina; Clay; W25; Singles and doubles draws	Amina Anshba (Ukraine) Valeriya Strakhova; 1–6, 6–4, [10–7]	(Colombia) Yuliana Lizarazo (Colombia) María Paulina Pérez	(Slovenia) Pia Lovrič (Belgium) Sofia Costoulas	(Argentina) Martina Capurro Taborda (Serbia) Tijana Sretenović (Spain) Carlota Martínez Círez; Amina Anshba
January 9	GB Pro-Series Loughborough, Loughborough, United Kingdom; Hard (indoor); W25; Singles and doubles draws	(Switzerland) Céline Naef; 6–0, 6–4	(United Kingdom) Eliz Maloney	(Sweden) Kajsa Rinaldo Persson (Hungary) Fanny Stollár	(Netherlands) Bibiane Schoofs (Slovakia) Katarína Strešnáková (Italy) Giulia Gatto-Monticone (Lithuania) Justina Mikulskytė
January 9	GB Pro-Series Loughborough, Loughborough, United Kingdom; Hard (indoor); W25; Singles and doubles draws	(Slovakia) Viktória Morvayová (Czech Republic) Anna Sisková; 6–3, 6–7^{(3–7)}, [10–6]	(Lithuania) Justina Mikulskytė (Netherlands) Bibiane Schoofs	(Sweden) Kajsa Rinaldo Persson (Hungary) Fanny Stollár	(Netherlands) Bibiane Schoofs (Slovakia) Katarína Strešnáková (Italy) Giulia Gatto-Monticone (Lithuania) Justina Mikulskytė
January 9	Naples, United States; Clay; W25; Singles and doubles draws	(United States) Emma Navarro; 6–3, 7–5	(United States) Peyton Stearns	(Colombia) Emiliana Arango (United States) Whitney Osuigwe	(United States) Jamie Loeb; Vera Lapko (Poland) Katarzyna Kawa (Romania) Oana Georgeta Simion
January 9	Naples, United States; Clay; W25; Singles and doubles draws	(United States) Reese Brantmeier (United States) Makenna Jones; 6–4, 6–2	(United Kingdom) Emily Appleton (United States) Quinn Gleason	(Colombia) Emiliana Arango (United States) Whitney Osuigwe	(United States) Jamie Loeb; Vera Lapko (Poland) Katarzyna Kawa (Romania) Oana Georgeta Simion
January 9	Fort-de-France, Martinique, France; Hard; W15; Singles and doubles draws	(France) Emma Léné; 6–2, 6–4	(France) Sarah Iliev	(Switzerland) Jenny Dürst (Sweden) Fanny Östlund	(France) Jenny Lim (United States) Anna Ulyashchenko (France) Margaux Rouvroy (Canada) Ana Grubor
January 9	Fort-de-France, Martinique, France; Hard; W15; Singles and doubles draws	(Switzerland) Jenny Dürst (Sweden) Fanny Östlund; 6–4, 3–6, [10–4]	(Canada) Bianca Fernandez (United States) Anna Ulyashchenko	(Switzerland) Jenny Dürst (Sweden) Fanny Östlund	(France) Jenny Lim (United States) Anna Ulyashchenko (France) Margaux Rouvroy (Canada) Ana Grubor
January 9	Antalya, Turkey; Clay; W15; Singles and doubles draws	(Hungary) Panna Bartha; 2–6, 6–3, 6–3	Daria Lodikova	Diana Demidova (Ukraine) Anastasiya Soboleva	(Poland) Zuzanna Frankowska (Italy) Sofia Rocchetti (Switzerland) Katerina Tsygourova (Italy) Alessandra Mazzola
January 9	Antalya, Turkey; Clay; W15; Singles and doubles draws	(Turkey) Ayşegül Mert (Turkey) Doğa Türkmen; 6–7^{(5–7)}, 6–2, [10–8]	(United States) Qavia Lopez (Belgium) Amelia Waligora	Diana Demidova (Ukraine) Anastasiya Soboleva	(Poland) Zuzanna Frankowska (Italy) Sofia Rocchetti (Switzerland) Katerina Tsygourova (Italy) Alessandra Mazzola
January 16	Vero Beach International Tennis Open; Vero Beach, United States; Clay; W60; Singles – Doubles	(Belgium) Marie Benoît; 6–2, 7–5	(United States) Emma Navarro	(United States) Elvina Kalieva; Vera Lapko	(United States) Anna Rogers (Colombia) Emiliana Arango (Poland) Katarzyna Kawa (United States) Peyton Stearns
January 16	Vero Beach International Tennis Open; Vero Beach, United States; Clay; W60; Singles – Doubles	(United States) Francesca Di Lorenzo (United States) Makenna Jones; 4–6, 6–3, [10–3]	(United States) Quinn Gleason (France) Elixane Lechemia	(United States) Elvina Kalieva; Vera Lapko	(United States) Anna Rogers (Colombia) Emiliana Arango (Poland) Katarzyna Kawa (United States) Peyton Stearns
January 16	Tallinn, Estonia; Hard (i); W40; Singles and doubles draws	(Turkey) Zeynep Sönmez; 7–6^{(7–5)}, 3–6, 6–3	(Slovakia) Viktória Kužmová	(Netherlands) Lesley Pattinama Kerkhove (France) Chloé Paquet	(Czech Republic) Lucie Havlíčková (France) Audrey Albié (North Macedonia) Lina Gjorcheska (Czech Republic) Dominika Šalková
January 16	Tallinn, Estonia; Hard (i); W40; Singles and doubles draws	(United States) Jessie Aney (Czech Republic) Anna Sisková; 6–4, 6–7^{(3–7)}, [10–7]	(United Kingdom) Freya Christie (United Kingdom) Ali Collins	(Netherlands) Lesley Pattinama Kerkhove (France) Chloé Paquet	(Czech Republic) Lucie Havlíčková (France) Audrey Albié (North Macedonia) Lina Gjorcheska (Czech Republic) Dominika Šalková
January 16	Bhopal, India; Hard; W40; Singles and doubles draws	Anastasia Tikhonova; 6–4, 6–1	(Switzerland) Joanne Züger	Ekaterina Makarova; Valeria Savinykh	(Uzbekistan) Nigina Abduraimova (Japan) Eri Shimizu (Japan) Mana Kawamura; Ksenia Zaytseva
January 16	Bhopal, India; Hard; W40; Singles and doubles draws	(Japan) Erina Hayashi (Japan) Saki Imamura; 6–3, 7–6^{(7–3)}	Ekaterina Makarova; Ekaterina Reyngold	Ekaterina Makarova; Valeria Savinykh	(Uzbekistan) Nigina Abduraimova (Japan) Eri Shimizu (Japan) Mana Kawamura; Ksenia Zaytseva
January 16	Monastir, Tunisia; Hard; W40; Singles and doubles draws	(Japan) Sakura Hosogi; 7–6^{(10–8)}, 6–4	Yuliya Hatouka	(Croatia) Lucija Ćirić Bagarić; Anastasia Zolotareva	(Greece) Sapfo Sakellaridi (France) Alice Tubello; Iryna Shymanovich; Sofya Lansere
January 16	Monastir, Tunisia; Hard; W40; Singles and doubles draws	(Burundi) Sada Nahimana (Romania) Andreea Prisăcariu; 7–5, 6–4	Alena Fomina-Klotz; Iryna Shymanovich	(Croatia) Lucija Ćirić Bagarić; Anastasia Zolotareva	(Greece) Sapfo Sakellaridi (France) Alice Tubello; Iryna Shymanovich; Sofya Lansere
January 16	Buenos Aires, Argentina; Clay; W25; Singles and doubles draws	(Spain) Carlota Martínez Círez; 6–4, 5–7, 6–3	(Italy) Nuria Brancaccio	(Brazil) Gabriela Cé (Argentina) Solana Sierra	(Brazil) Carolina Alves (Germany) Natalia Siedliska (Argentina) Martina Capurro Taborda (Italy) Martina Colmegna
January 16	Buenos Aires, Argentina; Clay; W25; Singles and doubles draws	Amina Anshba (Ukraine) Valeriya Strakhova; 6–1, 6–2	(Peru) Romina Ccuno (Colombia) María Herazo González	(Brazil) Gabriela Cé (Argentina) Solana Sierra	(Brazil) Carolina Alves (Germany) Natalia Siedliska (Argentina) Martina Capurro Taborda (Italy) Martina Colmegna
January 16	Petit-Bourg, Guadeloupe, France; Hard; W25; Singles and doubles draws	(France) Margaux Rouvroy; 6–2, 1–6, 6–1	(France) Emma Léné	(Serbia) Katarina Kozarov (United States) Jenna DeFalco	(France) Jenny Lim (France) Sarah Iliev (Canada) Cadence Brace (Sweden) Fanny Östlund
January 16	Petit-Bourg, Guadeloupe, France; Hard; W25; Singles and doubles draws	(Switzerland) Jenny Dürst (Sweden) Fanny Östlund; 6–4, 6–3	(United States) Clervie Ngounoue (Denmark) Johanne Svendsen	(Serbia) Katarina Kozarov (United States) Jenna DeFalco	(France) Jenny Lim (France) Sarah Iliev (Canada) Cadence Brace (Sweden) Fanny Östlund
January 16	Boca Raton, United States; Clay; W25; Singles and doubles draws	(Mexico) Renata Zarazúa; 6–2, 7–5	(Switzerland) Lulu Sun	(United States) Ashley Lahey (United States) Liv Hovde	(United States) Allura Zamarripa (United States) Vivian Wolff (Italy) Jessica Pieri (United States) Hanna Chang
January 16	Boca Raton, United States; Clay; W25; Singles and doubles draws	(France) Tiphanie Fiquet (United States) Ashley Lahey; 4–6, 6–1, [10–4]	(Canada) Kayla Cross (Mexico) Renata Zarazúa	(United States) Ashley Lahey (United States) Liv Hovde	(United States) Allura Zamarripa (United States) Vivian Wolff (Italy) Jessica Pieri (United States) Hanna Chang
January 16	Antalya, Turkey; Clay; W15; Singles and doubles draws	(Ukraine) Anastasiya Soboleva; 6–2, 6–1	Alexandra Shubladze	(Hungary) Panna Bartha; Diana Demidova	(Switzerland) Katerina Tsygourova (Turkey) Ayşegül Mert (Slovakia) Anika Jašková (Italy) Alessandra Mazzola
January 16	Antalya, Turkey; Clay; W15; Singles and doubles draws	Daria Lodikova; Ekaterina Ovcharenko; 6–2, 6–3	(United States) Hurricane Tyra Black (United States) Qavia Lopez	(Hungary) Panna Bartha; Diana Demidova	(Switzerland) Katerina Tsygourova (Turkey) Ayşegül Mert (Slovakia) Anika Jašková (Italy) Alessandra Mazzola
January 23	Engie Open Andrézieux-Bouthéon 42; Andrézieux-Bouthéon, France; Hard (indoor); W60; Singles – Doubles	(France) Océane Dodin; 3–6, 6–2, 7–5	(France) Audrey Albié	(Ukraine) Daria Snigur; Oksana Selekhmeteva	(France) Jessika Ponchet (Turkey) Zeynep Sönmez (Switzerland) Simona Waltert (France) Amandine Monnot
January 23	Engie Open Andrézieux-Bouthéon 42; Andrézieux-Bouthéon, France; Hard (indoor); W60; Singles – Doubles	Sofya Lansere; Oksana Selekhmeteva; 6–3, 6–0	(Switzerland) Conny Perrin; Iryna Shymanovich	(Ukraine) Daria Snigur; Oksana Selekhmeteva	(France) Jessika Ponchet (Turkey) Zeynep Sönmez (Switzerland) Simona Waltert (France) Amandine Monnot
January 23	GB Pro-Series Sunderland; Sunderland, United Kingdom; Hard (indoor); W60; Singles – Doubles	(Belgium) Greet Minnen; 6–2, 1–6, 6–0	(Germany) Mona Barthel	(Belgium) Magali Kempen (Netherlands) Lesley Pattinama Kerkhove	(United Kingdom) Sonay Kartal (Spain) Jéssica Bouzas Maneiro (Netherlands) Jasmijn Gimbrère (Italy) Angelica Moratelli
January 23	GB Pro-Series Sunderland; Sunderland, United Kingdom; Hard (indoor); W60; Singles – Doubles	(United Kingdom) Freya Christie (United Kingdom) Ali Collins; 6–3, 7–6^{(7–5)}	(Belgium) Magali Kempen (United Kingdom) Eden Silva	(Belgium) Magali Kempen (Netherlands) Lesley Pattinama Kerkhove	(United Kingdom) Sonay Kartal (Spain) Jéssica Bouzas Maneiro (Netherlands) Jasmijn Gimbrère (Italy) Angelica Moratelli
January 23	Pune, India; Hard; W40; Singles and doubles draws	(Germany) Tatjana Maria; 6–1, 6–1	(Uzbekistan) Nigina Abduraimova	(India) Ankita Raina; Valeria Savinykh	Irina Khromacheva (India) Karman Thandi; Anastasia Tikhonova (Japan) Eri Shimizu
January 23	Pune, India; Hard; W40; Singles and doubles draws	(India) Ankita Raina (India) Prarthana Thombare; 4–6, 7–5, [10–8]	(Kazakhstan) Gozal Ainitdinova (Kazakhstan) Zhibek Kulambayeva	(India) Ankita Raina; Valeria Savinykh	Irina Khromacheva (India) Karman Thandi; Anastasia Tikhonova (Japan) Eri Shimizu
January 23	Monastir, Tunisia; Hard; W25; Singles and doubles draws	(Serbia) Lola Radivojević; 6–1, 7–5	(Japan) Sakura Hosogi	(China) Wei Sijia; Tatiana Prozorova	(Greece) Valentini Grammatikopoulou (Spain) Guiomar Maristany (Indonesia) Priska Madelyn Nugroho (France) Tessah Andrianjafitrimo
January 23	Monastir, Tunisia; Hard; W25; Singles and doubles draws	(Romania) Oana Gavrilă (Greece) Sapfo Sakellaridi; 7–5, 4–6, [10–6]	(Japan) Miho Kuramochi (Chinese Taipei) Tsao Chia-yi	(China) Wei Sijia; Tatiana Prozorova	(Greece) Valentini Grammatikopoulou (Spain) Guiomar Maristany (Indonesia) Priska Madelyn Nugroho (France) Tessah Andrianjafitrimo
January 23	Orlando USTA Pro Circuit Event; Orlando, United States; Hard; W25; Singles and doubles draws	(United States) Peyton Stearns; 6–2, 6–0	(United States) Robin Montgomery	(United States) Emina Bektas (United States) Ann Li	(United States) Sophie Chang (United States) Kayla Day (United States) Victoria Hu (Czech Republic) Gabriela Knutson
January 23	Orlando USTA Pro Circuit Event; Orlando, United States; Hard; W25; Singles and doubles draws	(United States) Jada Hart (United States) Rasheeda McAdoo; 6–3, 6–3	(Japan) Haruna Arakawa (Japan) Natsuho Arakawa	(United States) Emina Bektas (United States) Ann Li	(United States) Sophie Chang (United States) Kayla Day (United States) Victoria Hu (Czech Republic) Gabriela Knutson
January 23	Antalya, Turkey; Clay; W15; Singles and doubles draws	(Ukraine) Anastasiya Soboleva; 6–7^{(3–7)}, 7–5, 7–6^{(7–5)}	Daria Lodikova	(United States) Hurricane Tyra Black; Ekaterina Ovcharenko	(Slovakia) Anika Jašková (Italy) Sofia Rocchetti (Netherlands) Rikke de Koning; Diana Demidova
January 23	Antalya, Turkey; Clay; W15; Singles and doubles draws	Polina Leykina; Ekaterina Ovcharenko; 6–2, 3–6, [10–4]	(United States) Hurricane Tyra Black (Turkey) Doğa Türkmen	(United States) Hurricane Tyra Black; Ekaterina Ovcharenko	(Slovakia) Anika Jašková (Italy) Sofia Rocchetti (Netherlands) Rikke de Koning; Diana Demidova
January 30	Burnie International; Burnie, Australia; Hard; W60; Singles – Doubles	(Australia) Storm Hunter; 6–4, 6–3	(Australia) Olivia Gadecki	(Australia) Jaimee Fourlis (Australia) Lizette Cabrera	(Australia) Petra Hule (Australia) Priscilla Hon (Japan) Mai Hontama (China) Ma Yexin
January 30	Burnie International; Burnie, Australia; Hard; W60; Singles – Doubles	(Japan) Mai Hontama (Japan) Eri Hozumi; 4–6, 6–3, [10–6]	(Australia) Arina Rodionova (Japan) Ena Shibahara	(Australia) Jaimee Fourlis (Australia) Lizette Cabrera	(Australia) Petra Hule (Australia) Priscilla Hon (Japan) Mai Hontama (China) Ma Yexin
January 30	Georgia's Rome Tennis Open; Rome, United States; Hard (indoor); W60; Singles – Doubles	(United States) Peyton Stearns; 3–6, 6–0, 6–2	(Czech Republic) Gabriela Knutson	(Switzerland) Lulu Sun (United States) Francesca Di Lorenzo	(Denmark) Johanne Svendsen (Spain) Andrea Lázaro García (United States) Ashley Lahey (Mexico) Marcela Zacarías
January 30	Georgia's Rome Tennis Open; Rome, United States; Hard (indoor); W60; Singles – Doubles	(Hungary) Fanny Stollár (Switzerland) Lulu Sun; 6–3, 6–0	(Japan) Mana Ayukawa (Czech Republic) Gabriela Knutson	(Switzerland) Lulu Sun (United States) Francesca Di Lorenzo	(Denmark) Johanne Svendsen (Spain) Andrea Lázaro García (United States) Ashley Lahey (Mexico) Marcela Zacarías
January 30	Porto, Portugal; Hard (indoor); W40; Singles and doubles draws	(Switzerland) Céline Naef; 6–2, 6–4	(Italy) Lucrezia Stefanini	(Switzerland) Susan Bandecchi (France) Harmony Tan	(Georgia (country)) Ekaterine Gorgodze; Sofya Lansere (Romania) Jaqueline Cristian (France) Chloé Paquet
January 30	Porto, Portugal; Hard (indoor); W40; Singles and doubles draws	(Switzerland) Céline Naef (Belgium) Yanina Wickmayer; 6–1, 6–4	(France) Alice Robbe (Croatia) Tara Würth	(Switzerland) Susan Bandecchi (France) Harmony Tan	(Georgia (country)) Ekaterine Gorgodze; Sofya Lansere (Romania) Jaqueline Cristian (France) Chloé Paquet
January 30	Mexico City, Mexico; Hard; W40; Singles and doubles draws	(Turkey) Berfu Cengiz; 6–4, 1–6, 7–6^{(11–9)}	(China) Yuan Yue	(Belgium) Sofia Costoulas (Greece) Despina Papamichail	(United States) Taylor Ng (Israel) Lina Glushko (Germany) Sabine Lisicki (United States) Emina Bektas
January 30	Mexico City, Mexico; Hard; W40; Singles and doubles draws	(Turkey) Berfu Cengiz (United States) Sofia Sewing; 6–1, 1–6, [12–10]	(Netherlands) Suzan Lamens (Latvia) Darja Semeņistaja	(Belgium) Sofia Costoulas (Greece) Despina Papamichail	(United States) Taylor Ng (Israel) Lina Glushko (Germany) Sabine Lisicki (United States) Emina Bektas
January 30	Antalya, Turkey; Clay; W25; Singles and doubles draws	(Australia) Seone Mendez; 6–2, 7–5	(Slovenia) Nina Potočnik	(Bosnia and Herzegovina) Dea Herdželaš (Spain) Alba Rey García	(Ukraine) Anastasiya Soboleva (Romania) Cristina Dinu (Egypt) Sandra Samir (Spain) Carlota Martínez Círez
January 30	Antalya, Turkey; Clay; W25; Singles and doubles draws	(Romania) Cristina Dinu (Slovenia) Nika Radišić; 7–5, 6–2	(Egypt) Sandra Samir (Hong Kong) Cody Wong	(Bosnia and Herzegovina) Dea Herdželaš (Spain) Alba Rey García	(Ukraine) Anastasiya Soboleva (Romania) Cristina Dinu (Egypt) Sandra Samir (Spain) Carlota Martínez Círez
January 30	Monastir, Tunisia; Hard; W15; Singles and doubles draws	(France) Fiona Ferro; 6–4, 6–3	(Italy) Cristiana Ferrando	(France) Manon Léonard (Switzerland) Nadine Keller	(Switzerland) Valentina Ryser (Germany) Mara Guth (Switzerland) Tess Sugnaux (Chinese Taipei) Lee Ya-hsin
January 30	Monastir, Tunisia; Hard; W15; Singles and doubles draws	(Chinese Taipei) Lee Ya-hsin (China) Yang Yidi; 2–6, 6–3, [15–13]	(Switzerland) Nadine Keller (Chinese Taipei) Tsao Chia-yi	(France) Manon Léonard (Switzerland) Nadine Keller	(Switzerland) Valentina Ryser (Germany) Mara Guth (Switzerland) Tess Sugnaux (Chinese Taipei) Lee Ya-hsin
January 30	Sharm El Sheikh, Egypt; Hard; W15; Singles and doubles draws	Darya Shauha; 4–6, 6–3, 6–3	(Hong Kong) Wu Ho-ching	(Lithuania) Klaudija Bubelytė (Slovakia) Eszter Méri	Kira Pavlova (Japan) Michika Ozeki (Lithuania) Emilija Tverijonaitė (Belgium) Amelia Waligora
January 30	Sharm El Sheikh, Egypt; Hard; W15; Singles and doubles draws	(Slovakia) Katarína Kužmová; Darya Shauha; 6–3, 6–7^{(5–7)}, [10–3]	(Romania) Sabina Dadaciu (Romania) Anca Todoni	(Lithuania) Klaudija Bubelytė (Slovakia) Eszter Méri	Kira Pavlova (Japan) Michika Ozeki (Lithuania) Emilija Tverijonaitė (Belgium) Amelia Waligora

=== February ===
Week of	Tournament	Winner	Runners-up	Semifinalists	Quarterfinalists
February 6	Open de l'Isère; Grenoble, France; Hard (indoor); W60; Singles – Doubles	(France) Océane Dodin; 6–2, 7–5	(Switzerland) Simona Waltert	Oksana Selekhmeteva (France) Jessika Ponchet	(France) Clara Burel (Liechtenstein) Kathinka von Deichmann (France) Margaux Rouvroy (France) Audrey Albié
February 6	Open de l'Isère; Grenoble, France; Hard (indoor); W60; Singles – Doubles	(United Kingdom) Freya Christie (United Kingdom) Ali Collins; 6–4, 6–3	Sofya Lansere; Maria Timofeeva	Oksana Selekhmeteva (France) Jessika Ponchet	(France) Clara Burel (Liechtenstein) Kathinka von Deichmann (France) Margaux Rouvroy (France) Audrey Albié
February 6	Orlando USTA Pro Circuit Event; Orlando, United States; Hard; W60; Singles – Doubles	(Australia) Kimberly Birrell; 6–3, 6–0	(Sweden) Rebecca Peterson	(Germany) Sabine Lisicki (United States) Ashlyn Krueger	(Netherlands) Arianne Hartono (United States) Caroline Dolehide (United States) Francesca Di Lorenzo (United States) Sachia Vickery
February 6	Orlando USTA Pro Circuit Event; Orlando, United States; Hard; W60; Singles – Doubles	(United States) Ashlyn Krueger (United States) Robin Montgomery; 7–5, 6–1	(Netherlands) Arianne Hartono (Netherlands) Eva Vedder	(Germany) Sabine Lisicki (United States) Ashlyn Krueger	(Netherlands) Arianne Hartono (United States) Caroline Dolehide (United States) Francesca Di Lorenzo (United States) Sachia Vickery
February 6	Mexico City, Mexico; Hard; W40; Singles and doubles draws	(Latvia) Darja Semeņistaja; 7–5, 4–0 ret.	Jana Kolodynska	(Argentina) Nadia Podoroska (Israel) Lina Glushko	(Japan) Rina Saigo (Cyprus) Raluca Șerban (Greece) Despina Papamichail (Lithuania) Justina Mikulskytė
February 6	Mexico City, Mexico; Hard; W40; Singles and doubles draws	(Greece) Despina Papamichail (Cyprus) Raluca Șerban; 3–6, 6–4, [10–4]	(Colombia) Yuliana Lizarazo (Colombia) María Paulina Pérez	(Argentina) Nadia Podoroska (Israel) Lina Glushko	(Japan) Rina Saigo (Cyprus) Raluca Șerban (Greece) Despina Papamichail (Lithuania) Justina Mikulskytė
February 6	Porto, Portugal; Hard (indoor); W40; Singles and doubles draws	(Belgium) Greet Minnen; 6–2, 6–2	(Croatia) Tara Würth	Maria Bondarenko (France) Harmony Tan	Anastasia Gasanova (Finland) Anastasia Kulikova (Switzerland) Céline Naef; Ksenia Zaytseva
February 6	Porto, Portugal; Hard (indoor); W40; Singles and doubles draws	(Georgia (country)) Ekaterine Gorgodze (Spain) Leyre Romero Gormaz; 6–4, 2–6, [11–9]	(Portugal) Matilde Jorge (Croatia) Tara Würth	Maria Bondarenko (France) Harmony Tan	Anastasia Gasanova (Finland) Anastasia Kulikova (Switzerland) Céline Naef; Ksenia Zaytseva
February 6	Burnie International; Burnie, Australia; Hard; W25; Singles and doubles draws	(Australia) Jaimee Fourlis; 6–4, 6–3	(Australia) Olivia Gadecki	(Japan) Himeno Sakatsume (Australia) Lizette Cabrera	(Australia) Arina Rodionova (Japan) Erika Sema (Japan) Misaki Matsuda (Australia) Alexandra Bozovic
February 6	Burnie International; Burnie, Australia; Hard; W25; Singles and doubles draws	(Australia) Destanee Aiava (United Kingdom) Naiktha Bains; 6–3, 7–5	(Australia) Lily Fairclough (Australia) Olivia Gadecki	(Japan) Himeno Sakatsume (Australia) Lizette Cabrera	(Australia) Arina Rodionova (Japan) Erika Sema (Japan) Misaki Matsuda (Australia) Alexandra Bozovic
February 6	GB Pro-Series Bath; Bath, United Kingdom; Hard (indoor); W25; Singles and doubles draws	(Slovakia) Rebecca Šramková; 6–2, 6–2	(Czech Republic) Tereza Smitková	(France) Alice Robbe (Netherlands) Lesley Pattinama Kerkhove	(Czech Republic) Dominika Šalková (Slovakia) Viktória Morvayová (United Kingdom) Maia Lumsden (Belgium) Hanne Vandewinkel
February 6	GB Pro-Series Bath; Bath, United Kingdom; Hard (indoor); W25; Singles and doubles draws	(United Kingdom) Lauryn John-Baptiste (Slovakia) Katarína Strešnáková; 7–6^{(7–4)}, 6–4	(United Kingdom) Emily Appleton (Netherlands) Isabelle Haverlag	(France) Alice Robbe (Netherlands) Lesley Pattinama Kerkhove	(Czech Republic) Dominika Šalková (Slovakia) Viktória Morvayová (United Kingdom) Maia Lumsden (Belgium) Hanne Vandewinkel
February 6	Antalya, Turkey; Clay; W25; Singles and doubles draws	Tournament was cancelled due to 2023 Turkey–Syria earthquake			
February 6	Sharm El Sheikh, Egypt; Hard; W15; Singles and doubles draws	(Czech Republic) Linda Klimovičová; 7–5, 6–7^{(3–7)}, 6–2	(Slovakia) Katarína Kužmová	(Romania) Anca Todoni (Italy) Georgia Pedone	(Moldova) Ecaterina Visnevscaia (Hong Kong) Wu Ho-ching (Serbia) Darja Šuvirđonkova (Germany) Selina Dal
February 6	Sharm El Sheikh, Egypt; Hard; W15; Singles and doubles draws	(Italy) Giuliana Bestetti (Italy) Beatrice Stagno; 7–5, 6–2	(Turkey) Doğa Türkmen (Hong Kong) Wu Ho-ching	(Romania) Anca Todoni (Italy) Georgia Pedone	(Moldova) Ecaterina Visnevscaia (Hong Kong) Wu Ho-ching (Serbia) Darja Šuvirđonkova (Germany) Selina Dal
February 6	Jhajjar, India; Clay; W15; Singles and doubles draws	(Serbia) Tamara Čurović; 4–6, 6–2, 6–3	(India) Vaidehi Chaudhari	(India) Zeel Desai (Romania) Alexandra Iordache	(India) Humera Baharmus (Sweden) Vanessa Ersöz (Sweden) Fanny Östlund (India) Mihika Yadav
February 6	Jhajjar, India; Clay; W15; Singles and doubles draws	(Sweden) Vanessa Ersöz (Sweden) Fanny Östlund; 0–6, 7–5, [10–5]	(Romania) Alexandra Iordache (Uzbekistan) Sevil Yuldasheva	(India) Zeel Desai (Romania) Alexandra Iordache	(India) Humera Baharmus (Sweden) Vanessa Ersöz (Sweden) Fanny Östlund (India) Mihika Yadav
February 6	Monastir, Tunisia; Hard; W15; Singles and doubles draws	(France) Nina Radovanovic; 6–3, 6–0	(Tunisia) Chiraz Bechri	(Netherlands) Marente Sijbesma (Japan) Miho Kuramochi	Aliona Falei (Chinese Taipei) Lee Ya-hsin (Serbia) Elena Gemović (Germany) Lara Schmidt
February 6	Monastir, Tunisia; Hard; W15; Singles and doubles draws	(Switzerland) Leonie Küng (Germany) Chantal Sauvant; 7–5, 6–2	(Belgium) Tilwith Di Girolami (Lithuania) Patricija Paukštytė	(Netherlands) Marente Sijbesma (Japan) Miho Kuramochi	Aliona Falei (Chinese Taipei) Lee Ya-hsin (Serbia) Elena Gemović (Germany) Lara Schmidt
February 13	Burg-Wächter Ladies Open; Altenkirchen, Germany; Carpet (indoor); W60; Singles – Doubles	(Denmark) Clara Tauson; 7–6^{(7–5)}, 4–6, 6–2	(Belgium) Greet Minnen	(Romania) Jaqueline Cristian (Germany) Noma Noha Akugue	(Belgium) Yanina Wickmayer (Switzerland) Ylena In-Albon; Polina Kudermetova (Ukraine) Daria Snigur
February 13	Burg-Wächter Ladies Open; Altenkirchen, Germany; Carpet (indoor); W60; Singles – Doubles	(Belgium) Greet Minnen (Belgium) Yanina Wickmayer; 6–1, 6–3	(United Kingdom) Freya Christie (United Kingdom) Ali Collins	(Romania) Jaqueline Cristian (Germany) Noma Noha Akugue	(Belgium) Yanina Wickmayer (Switzerland) Ylena In-Albon; Polina Kudermetova (Ukraine) Daria Snigur
February 13	Guanajuato Open; Irapuato, Mexico; Hard; W60+H; Singles – Doubles	Kamilla Rakhimova; 6–0, 1–6, 6–2	(Cyprus) Raluca Șerban	(Mexico) Marcela Zacarías (United States) Ashlyn Krueger	(China) Wang Xinyu (Australia) Astra Sharma (Argentina) Nadia Podoroska (Australia) Kimberly Birrell
February 13	Guanajuato Open; Irapuato, Mexico; Hard; W60+H; Singles – Doubles	(United States) Emina Bektas (United States) Ingrid Neel; 7–6^{(7–4)}, 3–6, [10–6]	(United States) Quinn Gleason (France) Elixane Lechemia	(Mexico) Marcela Zacarías (United States) Ashlyn Krueger	(China) Wang Xinyu (Australia) Astra Sharma (Argentina) Nadia Podoroska (Australia) Kimberly Birrell
February 13	Santo Domingo, Dominican Republic; Hard; W25; Singles and doubles draws	(France) Carole Monnet; 7–5, 3–6, 6–1	(Latvia) Darja Semeņistaja	(Spain) Irene Burillo Escorihuela (United States) Hailey Baptiste	(Czech Republic) Sára Bejlek (Netherlands) Arianne Hartono (United States) Sofia Sewing (Spain) Andrea Lázaro García
February 13	Santo Domingo, Dominican Republic; Hard; W25; Singles and doubles draws	(Latvia) Darja Semeņistaja (United States) Sofia Sewing; 6–3, 6–2	(Bosnia and Herzegovina) Nefisa Berberović (Hong Kong) Eudice Chong	(Spain) Irene Burillo Escorihuela (United States) Hailey Baptiste	(Czech Republic) Sára Bejlek (Netherlands) Arianne Hartono (United States) Sofia Sewing (Spain) Andrea Lázaro García
February 13	GB Pro-Series Glasgow; Glasgow, United Kingdom; Hard (indoor); W25; Singles and doubles draws	(Belgium) Marie Benoît; 3–6, 6–4, 6–1	(United Kingdom) Heather Watson	(Croatia) Lea Bošković (United Kingdom) Sonay Kartal	(Czech Republic) Anna Sisková (Estonia) Elena Malõgina (France) Alice Robbe (Czech Republic) Dominika Šalková
February 13	GB Pro-Series Glasgow; Glasgow, United Kingdom; Hard (indoor); W25; Singles and doubles draws	(United Kingdom) Maia Lumsden (United Kingdom) Ella McDonald; 3–6, 6–1, [13–11]	(Czech Republic) Dominika Šalková (Czech Republic) Anna Sisková	(Croatia) Lea Bošković (United Kingdom) Sonay Kartal	(Czech Republic) Anna Sisková (Estonia) Elena Malõgina (France) Alice Robbe (Czech Republic) Dominika Šalková
February 13	Antalya, Turkey; Clay; W25; Singles and doubles draws	Tournament was cancelled due to 2023 Turkey–Syria earthquake			
February 13	Sharm El Sheikh, Egypt; Hard; W15; Singles and doubles draws	(Italy) Dalila Spiteri; 6–3, 6–7^{(4–7)}, 6–1	(Romania) Anca Todoni	(Lithuania) Emilija Tverijonaitė (Czech Republic) Linda Klimovičová	(Hungary) Luca Udvardy; Evgeniya Burdina (South Korea) Back Da-yeon (Romania) Lavinia Tănăsie
February 13	Sharm El Sheikh, Egypt; Hard; W15; Singles and doubles draws	(Lithuania) Klaudija Bubelytė (Egypt) Merna Refaat; 6–2, 7–6^{(8–6)}	(Italy) Giuliana Bestetti (Italy) Beatrice Stagno	(Lithuania) Emilija Tverijonaitė (Czech Republic) Linda Klimovičová	(Hungary) Luca Udvardy; Evgeniya Burdina (South Korea) Back Da-yeon (Romania) Lavinia Tănăsie
February 13	Jhajjar, India; Clay; W15; Singles and doubles draws	(India) Zeel Desai; 1–6, 6–1, 6–4	(India) Sandeepti Singh Rao	(Serbia) Tamara Čurović (India) Vaidehi Chaudhari	(India) Shrivalli Bhamidipaty (India) Humera Baharmus (Sweden) Fanny Östlund (Romania) Alexandra Iordache
February 13	Jhajjar, India; Clay; W15; Singles and doubles draws	(Latvia) Diāna Marcinkēviča (Sweden) Fanny Östlund; 6–2, 6–1	(India) Vaidehi Chaudhari (India) Zeel Desai	(Serbia) Tamara Čurović (India) Vaidehi Chaudhari	(India) Shrivalli Bhamidipaty (India) Humera Baharmus (Sweden) Fanny Östlund (Romania) Alexandra Iordache
February 13	Ipoh, Malaysia; Hard; W15; Singles and doubles draws	(Thailand) Lanlana Tararudee; 6–0, 3–6, 6–2	(United States) Jaeda Daniel	(Japan) Ayumi Koshiishi (Thailand) Anchisa Chanta	(Japan) Mei Yamaguchi (South Korea) Kim Da-bin (China) Xun Fangying (China) Guo Hanyu
February 13	Ipoh, Malaysia; Hard; W15; Singles and doubles draws	(Chinese Taipei) Li Yu-yun (Ukraine) Anastasiia Poplavska; 7–5, 6–2	(China) Feng Shuo (China) Guo Hanyu	(Japan) Ayumi Koshiishi (Thailand) Anchisa Chanta	(Japan) Mei Yamaguchi (South Korea) Kim Da-bin (China) Xun Fangying (China) Guo Hanyu
February 13	Manacor, Spain; Hard; W15; Singles and doubles draws	(France) Nahia Berecoechea; 6–4, 7–6^{(8–6)}	(Portugal) Inês Murta	(Spain) Alba Rey García (Romania) Ioana Loredana Roșca	(China) Mi Tianmi (Spain) Ariana Geerlings (United States) Qavia Lopez (Spain) Claudia Hoste Ferrer
February 13	Manacor, Spain; Hard; W15; Singles and doubles draws	(Denmark) Rebecca Munk Mortensen (Portugal) Inês Murta; 6–0, 6–3	(Israel) Mika Dagan Fruchtman (Israel) Shavit Kimchi	(Spain) Alba Rey García (Romania) Ioana Loredana Roșca	(China) Mi Tianmi (Spain) Ariana Geerlings (United States) Qavia Lopez (Spain) Claudia Hoste Ferrer
February 13	Monastir, Tunisia; Hard; W15; Singles and doubles draws	(Italy) Angelica Raggi; 3–6, 6–2, 6–0	(Japan) Kayo Nishimura	(Tunisia) Chiraz Bechri (France) Nina Radovanovic	(France) Yasmine Mansouri (Denmark) Elena Jamshidi (Japan) Miho Kuramochi (Germany) Chantal Sauvant
February 13	Monastir, Tunisia; Hard; W15; Singles and doubles draws	(Chinese Taipei) Lee Ya-hsin (China) Liu Fangzhou; 6–3, 7–6^{(14–12)}	(Chile) Fernanda Labraña (Serbia) Elena Milovanović	(Tunisia) Chiraz Bechri (France) Nina Radovanovic	(France) Yasmine Mansouri (Denmark) Elena Jamshidi (Japan) Miho Kuramochi (Germany) Chantal Sauvant
February 20	Open Mâcon; Mâcon, France; Hard (indoor); W40; Singles and doubles draws	(France) Jessika Ponchet; 6–3, 2–6, 6–4	(Belgium) Yanina Wickmayer	(Slovenia) Tamara Zidanšek; Kristina Dmitruk	(France) Audrey Albié (France) Amandine Hesse (Romania) Jaqueline Cristian (France) Margaux Rouvroy
February 20	Open Mâcon; Mâcon, France; Hard (indoor); W40; Singles and doubles draws	(Belgium) Magali Kempen (Switzerland) Xenia Knoll; 6–3, 6–4	Darya Astakhova (India) Prarthana Thombare	(Slovenia) Tamara Zidanšek; Kristina Dmitruk	(France) Audrey Albié (France) Amandine Hesse (Romania) Jaqueline Cristian (France) Margaux Rouvroy
February 20	Tucumán, Argentina; Clay; W25; Singles and doubles draws	(Argentina) Solana Sierra; 6–2, 6–2	(Spain) Rosa Vicens Mas	(Spain) Carlota Martínez Círez (Argentina) Martina Capurro Taborda	(Argentina) Julia Riera (United Kingdom) Francesca Jones (Brazil) Gabriela Cé (Romania) Maria Sara Popa
February 20	Tucumán, Argentina; Clay; W25; Singles and doubles draws	(Colombia) María Herazo González (Netherlands) Lexie Stevens; 2–6, 6–3, [10–8]	(Australia) Seone Mendez (Latvia) Daniela Vismane	(Spain) Carlota Martínez Círez (Argentina) Martina Capurro Taborda	(Argentina) Julia Riera (United Kingdom) Francesca Jones (Brazil) Gabriela Cé (Romania) Maria Sara Popa
February 20	Swan Hill, Australia; Grass; W25; Singles and doubles draws	(Australia) Arina Rodionova; 6–4, 6–3	(Australia) Maddison Inglis	(United Kingdom) Naiktha Bains (Chinese Taipei) Liang En-shuo	(Australia) Olivia Gadecki (Chinese Taipei) Joanna Garland (Australia) Petra Hule (China) Wang Yafan
February 20	Swan Hill, Australia; Grass; W25; Singles and doubles draws	(Australia) Lily Fairclough (Australia) Olivia Gadecki; 6–3, 6–3	(Chinese Taipei) Liang En-shuo (China) Wang Yafan	(United Kingdom) Naiktha Bains (Chinese Taipei) Liang En-shuo	(Australia) Olivia Gadecki (Chinese Taipei) Joanna Garland (Australia) Petra Hule (China) Wang Yafan
February 20	Santo Domingo, Dominican Republic; Hard; W25; Singles and doubles draws	(Canada) Stacey Fung; 2–6, 7–6^{(7–5)}, 6–1	(Hong Kong) Eudice Chong	(United States) Jessie Aney (Netherlands) Eva Vedder	(France) Tessah Andrianjafitrimo (Belgium) Sofia Costoulas (Hungary) Fanny Stollár (Spain) Irene Burillo Escorihuela
February 20	Santo Domingo, Dominican Republic; Hard; W25; Singles and doubles draws	(United States) Jada Hart (United States) Rasheeda McAdoo; 6–3, 6–3	(Netherlands) Arianne Hartono (Netherlands) Eva Vedder	(United States) Jessie Aney (Netherlands) Eva Vedder	(France) Tessah Andrianjafitrimo (Belgium) Sofia Costoulas (Hungary) Fanny Stollár (Spain) Irene Burillo Escorihuela
February 20	Sharm El Sheikh, Egypt; Hard; W15; Singles and doubles draws	(South Korea) Lee Eun-hye; 6–4, 6–1	(Lithuania) Klaudija Bubelytė	(Lithuania) Emilija Tverijonaitė (South Korea) Back Da-yeon	(Egypt) Sandra Samir (Romania) Lavinia Tănăsie (Hungary) Luca Udvardy (United Kingdom) Emilie Lindh
February 20	Sharm El Sheikh, Egypt; Hard; W15; Singles and doubles draws	(United Kingdom) Emilie Lindh (Hungary) Luca Udvardy; 6–4, 5–7, [10–3]	Aleksandra Pospelova; Nina Rudiukova	(Lithuania) Emilija Tverijonaitė (South Korea) Back Da-yeon	(Egypt) Sandra Samir (Romania) Lavinia Tănăsie (Hungary) Luca Udvardy (United Kingdom) Emilie Lindh
February 20	Gurugram, India; Hard; W15; Singles and doubles draws	(India) Vaidehi Chaudhari; 4–6, 6–2, 6–0	(India) Sandeepti Singh Rao	(India) Zeel Desai (Sweden) Fanny Östlund	(Latvia) Diāna Marcinkēviča (Japan) Saki Imamura (Germany) Antonia Schmidt (Germany) Sarah-Rebecca Sekulic
February 20	Gurugram, India; Hard; W15; Singles and doubles draws	(India) Zeel Desai (Thailand) Punnin Kovapitukted; 6–2, 6–2	(India) Shrivalli Bhamidipaty (India) Vaidehi Chaudhari	(India) Zeel Desai (Sweden) Fanny Östlund	(Latvia) Diāna Marcinkēviča (Japan) Saki Imamura (Germany) Antonia Schmidt (Germany) Sarah-Rebecca Sekulic
February 20	Kuala Lumpur, Malaysia; Hard; W15; Singles and doubles draws	(China) Guo Hanyu; 6–4, 6–3	(Japan) Ayumi Koshiishi	(China) Xun Fangying (Thailand) Anchisa Chanta	(Kazakhstan) Gozal Ainitdinova (Japan) Junri Namigata (Japan) Riko Sawayanagi; Anastasia Sukhotina
February 20	Kuala Lumpur, Malaysia; Hard; W15; Singles and doubles draws	(China) Guo Hanyu (Chinese Taipei) Li Yu-yun; 6–0, 2–6, [10–2]	(Thailand) Anchisa Chanta (Japan) Ayaka Okuno	(China) Xun Fangying (Thailand) Anchisa Chanta	(Kazakhstan) Gozal Ainitdinova (Japan) Junri Namigata (Japan) Riko Sawayanagi; Anastasia Sukhotina
February 20	Manacor, Spain; Hard; W15; Singles and doubles draws	(Switzerland) Valentina Ryser; 6–3, 6–3	(Portugal) Inês Murta	(Romania) Ioana Loredana Roșca (Israel) Shavit Kimchi	(Romania) Ilinca Amariei (Germany) Carolina Kuhl (France) Nahia Berecoechea (Czech Republic) Denisa Hindová
February 20	Manacor, Spain; Hard; W15; Singles and doubles draws	(Spain) Olga Parres Azcoitia (Romania) Ioana Loredana Roșca; 6–4, 7–6^{(8–6)}	(Switzerland) Naïma Karamoko (Portugal) Inês Murta	(Romania) Ioana Loredana Roșca (Israel) Shavit Kimchi	(Romania) Ilinca Amariei (Germany) Carolina Kuhl (France) Nahia Berecoechea (Czech Republic) Denisa Hindová
February 20	Monastir, Tunisia; Hard; W15; Singles and doubles draws	(Serbia) Dejana Radanović; 6–7^{(4–7)}, 6–3, 6–2	(China) Liu Fangzhou	(Italy) Beatrice Ricci (Japan) Naho Sato	(Greece) Eleni Christofi (Switzerland) Leonie Küng (France) Tiantsoa Sarah Rakotomanga Rajaonah (Slovakia) Irina Balus
February 20	Monastir, Tunisia; Hard; W15; Singles and doubles draws	(Switzerland) Leonie Küng (Japan) Naho Sato; 6–2, 6–1	(Greece) Eleni Christofi (United States) Paris Corley	(Italy) Beatrice Ricci (Japan) Naho Sato	(Greece) Eleni Christofi (Switzerland) Leonie Küng (France) Tiantsoa Sarah Rakotomanga Rajaonah (Slovakia) Irina Balus
February 20	Antalya, Turkey; Clay; W15; Singles and doubles draws	Diana Demidova; 7–5, 6–3	(Turkey) Ayşegül Mert	(Romania) Simona Ogescu (Italy) Sofia Rocchetti	(Bulgaria) Julia Stamatova (Belgium) Vicky Van de Peer (Liechtenstein) Sylvie Zünd; Daria Lodikova
February 20	Antalya, Turkey; Clay; W15; Singles and doubles draws	(Brazil) Ana Candiotto; Daria Lodikova; 6–3, 6–2	(Italy) Alessandra Mazzola (Italy) Sofia Rocchetti	(Romania) Simona Ogescu (Italy) Sofia Rocchetti	(Bulgaria) Julia Stamatova (Belgium) Vicky Van de Peer (Liechtenstein) Sylvie Zünd; Daria Lodikova
February 27	Empire Women's Indoor; Trnava, Slovakia; Hard (indoor); W60; Singles – Doubles	(Romania) Jaqueline Cristian; 7–6^{(9–7)}, 7–6^{(7–4)}	(France) Océane Dodin	(Belgium) Greet Minnen (Slovakia) Kristína Kučová	(Czech Republic) Barbora Palicová (Belgium) Yanina Wickmayer (Slovenia) Tamara Zidanšek (Czech Republic) Tereza Smitková
February 27	Empire Women's Indoor; Trnava, Slovakia; Hard (indoor); W60; Singles – Doubles	(Belgium) Greet Minnen (Belgium) Yanina Wickmayer; 6–4, 6–4	(Greece) Sapfo Sakellaridi (Slovakia) Radka Zelníčková	(Belgium) Greet Minnen (Slovakia) Kristína Kučová	(Czech Republic) Barbora Palicová (Belgium) Yanina Wickmayer (Slovenia) Tamara Zidanšek (Czech Republic) Tereza Smitková
February 27	Arcadia Women's Pro Open; Arcadia, United States; Hard; W60; Singles – Doubles	(Italy) Sara Errani; Walkover	(Netherlands) Arantxa Rus	(Croatia) Petra Marčinko (France) Diane Parry	(Japan) Rina Saigo (United States) Megan McCray (United States) Sophie Chang (Japan) Ena Shibahara
February 27	Arcadia Women's Pro Open; Arcadia, United States; Hard; W60; Singles – Doubles	(United States) Francesca Di Lorenzo (United States) Christina Rosca; 6–1, 6–1	(Japan) Rina Saigo (Japan) Yukina Saigo	(Croatia) Petra Marčinko (France) Diane Parry	(Japan) Rina Saigo (United States) Megan McCray (United States) Sophie Chang (Japan) Ena Shibahara
February 27	BeeTV Women's; Astana, Kazakhstan; Hard (indoor); W40; Singles and doubles draws	Polina Kudermetova; 6–2, 6–3	Darya Astakhova	Anastasia Tikhonova (France) Chloé Paquet	(North Macedonia) Lina Gjorcheska (France) Kristina Mladenovic; Sofya Lansere (South Korea) Jang Su-jeong
February 27	BeeTV Women's; Astana, Kazakhstan; Hard (indoor); W40; Singles and doubles draws	(Kazakhstan) Anna Danilina; Iryna Shymanovich; 6–4, 6–7^{(8–10)}, [10–7]	(South Korea) Han Na-lae (South Korea) Jang Su-jeong	Anastasia Tikhonova (France) Chloé Paquet	(North Macedonia) Lina Gjorcheska (France) Kristina Mladenovic; Sofya Lansere (South Korea) Jang Su-jeong
February 27	Tucumán, Argentina; Clay; W25; Singles and doubles draws	(Spain) Rosa Vicens Mas; 6–2, 6–1	(Brazil) Carolina Alves	(Germany) Emily Seibold (Argentina) Martina Capurro Taborda	(Colombia) María Herazo González (Spain) Carlota Martínez Círez (Argentina) Julia Riera (Ukraine) Valeriya Strakhova
February 27	Tucumán, Argentina; Clay; W25; Singles and doubles draws	(Ukraine) Valeriya Strakhova (Latvia) Daniela Vismane; 6–3, 3–6, [13–11]	(Argentina) Guillermina Naya (Argentina) Julia Riera	(Germany) Emily Seibold (Argentina) Martina Capurro Taborda	(Colombia) María Herazo González (Spain) Carlota Martínez Círez (Argentina) Julia Riera (Ukraine) Valeriya Strakhova
February 27	Swan Hill, Australia; Grass; W25; Singles and doubles draws	(Chinese Taipei) Joanna Garland; 6–3, 4–6, 7–6^{(9–7)}	(China) Wang Yafan	(Australia) Olivia Gadecki (Chinese Taipei) Liang En-shuo	(China) Ma Yexin (Australia) Arina Rodionova (Australia) Lisa Mays (Chinese Taipei) Yang Ya-yi
February 27	Swan Hill, Australia; Grass; W25; Singles and doubles draws	(Australia) Elysia Bolton (Australia) Alexandra Bozovic; 7–6^{(7–3)}, 2–6, [10–7]	(Australia) Olivia Gadecki (Australia) Petra Hule	(Australia) Olivia Gadecki (Chinese Taipei) Liang En-shuo	(China) Ma Yexin (Australia) Arina Rodionova (Australia) Lisa Mays (Chinese Taipei) Yang Ya-yi
February 27	Toronto, Canada; Hard (indoor); W25; Singles and doubles draws	(Canada) Katherine Sebov; 6–4, 7–6^{(7–4)}	(Japan) Himeno Sakatsume	(United States) Taylor Ng (Czech Republic) Gabriela Knutson	(Slovakia) Viktória Kužmová (Canada) Kayla Cross (Romania) Miriam Bulgaru (United States) Jessie Aney
February 27	Toronto, Canada; Hard (indoor); W25; Singles and doubles draws	(Norway) Ulrikke Eikeri (Hungary) Fanny Stollár; 7–6^{(8–6)}, 6–0	(United States) Maya Joint (United States) Mia Yamakita	(United States) Taylor Ng (Czech Republic) Gabriela Knutson	(Slovakia) Viktória Kužmová (Canada) Kayla Cross (Romania) Miriam Bulgaru (United States) Jessie Aney
February 27	Open de Touraine; Joué-lès-Tours, France; Hard (indoor); W25; Singles and doubles draws	(China) Wei Sijia; 6–4, 7–6^{(7–5)}	(China) Bai Zhuoxuan	(South Korea) Ku Yeon-woo (Switzerland) Susan Bandecchi	(Sweden) Kajsa Rinaldo Persson (France) Nina Radovanovic (France) Émeline Dartron (Germany) Katharina Hobgarski
February 27	Open de Touraine; Joué-lès-Tours, France; Hard (indoor); W25; Singles and doubles draws	(Slovenia) Veronika Erjavec (Lithuania) Justina Mikulskytė; 6–4, 6–0	(United States) Chiara Scholl (Bosnia and Herzegovina) Anita Wagner	(South Korea) Ku Yeon-woo (Switzerland) Susan Bandecchi	(Sweden) Kajsa Rinaldo Persson (France) Nina Radovanovic (France) Émeline Dartron (Germany) Katharina Hobgarski
February 27	Bangalore, India; Hard (indoor); W25; Singles and doubles draws	(Japan) Misaki Matsuda; 7–5, 4–6, 7–6^{(8–6)}	(Japan) Misaki Doi	(Greece) Valentini Grammatikopoulou (Switzerland) Nadine Keller	(Bosnia and Herzegovina) Dea Herdželaš (Thailand) Punnin Kovapitukted (Japan) Eri Shimizu (Sweden) Jacqueline Cabaj Awad
February 27	Bangalore, India; Hard (indoor); W25; Singles and doubles draws	(Bosnia and Herzegovina) Dea Herdželaš (United Kingdom) Eden Silva; 3–6, 6–4, [10–7]	(Portugal) Francisca Jorge (Portugal) Matilde Jorge	(Greece) Valentini Grammatikopoulou (Switzerland) Nadine Keller	(Bosnia and Herzegovina) Dea Herdželaš (Thailand) Punnin Kovapitukted (Japan) Eri Shimizu (Sweden) Jacqueline Cabaj Awad
February 27	Spring, United States; Hard; W25; Singles and doubles draws	(Ukraine) Yulia Starodubtseva; 6–3, 2–6, 6–2	(United States) Maria Mateas	Maria Kononova (China) Lu Jiajing	(United States) Clervie Ngounoue (United States) Raveena Kingsley (France) Tiphanie Lemaître; Veronica Miroshnichenko
February 27	Spring, United States; Hard; W25; Singles and doubles draws	(United States) Maria Mateas (United States) Clervie Ngounoue; 6–4, 2–6, [10–4]	(United Kingdom) Sofia Johnson (Ukraine) Yulia Starodubtseva	Maria Kononova (China) Lu Jiajing	(United States) Clervie Ngounoue (United States) Raveena Kingsley (France) Tiphanie Lemaître; Veronica Miroshnichenko
February 27	Sharm El Sheikh, Egypt; Hard; W15; Singles and doubles draws	(Romania) Karola Bejenaru; 6–4, 6–2	(Egypt) Sandra Samir	(South Korea) Lee Eun-hye; Alevtina Ibragimova	(South Korea) Jeong Bo-young (United Kingdom) Emilie Lindh (Netherlands) Stéphanie Visscher (Hong Kong) Wu Ho-ching
February 27	Sharm El Sheikh, Egypt; Hard; W15; Singles and doubles draws	Polina Iatcenko (Egypt) Sandra Samir; 6–4, 7–5	(South Korea) Back Da-yeon (South Korea) Jeong Bo-young	(South Korea) Lee Eun-hye; Alevtina Ibragimova	(South Korea) Jeong Bo-young (United Kingdom) Emilie Lindh (Netherlands) Stéphanie Visscher (Hong Kong) Wu Ho-ching
February 27	Kuching, Malaysia; Hard; W15; Singles and doubles draws	(Japan) Ayumi Koshiishi; 5–7, 6–2, 6–1	(China) Guo Hanyu	(China) Ren Yufei (China) Feng Shuo	(South Korea) Kim Da-bin (United States) Jaeda Daniel (Japan) Mei Yamaguchi (Japan) Aoi Ito
February 27	Kuching, Malaysia; Hard; W15; Singles and doubles draws	(China) Guo Hanyu (Chinese Taipei) Li Yu-yun; 6–2, 6–3	(China) Feng Shuo (China) Guo Meiqi	(China) Ren Yufei (China) Feng Shuo	(South Korea) Kim Da-bin (United States) Jaeda Daniel (Japan) Mei Yamaguchi (Japan) Aoi Ito
February 27	Manacor, Spain; Hard; W15; Singles and doubles draws	(Belgium) Hanne Vandewinkel; 6–1, 6–0	(Switzerland) Bojana Klincov	(Switzerland) Fiona Ganz (Spain) Noelia Bouzó Zanotti	(China) Mi Tianmi (Ukraine) Oleksandra Oliynykova (Croatia) Iva Primorac (Switzerland) Valentina Ryser
February 27	Manacor, Spain; Hard; W15; Singles and doubles draws	(Germany) Joëlle Steur (Belgium) Hanne Vandewinkel; 7–6^{(7–4)}, 6–2	(Spain) Yvonne Cavallé Reimers (Spain) Marta González Encinas	(Switzerland) Fiona Ganz (Spain) Noelia Bouzó Zanotti	(China) Mi Tianmi (Ukraine) Oleksandra Oliynykova (Croatia) Iva Primorac (Switzerland) Valentina Ryser
February 27	Monastir, Tunisia; Hard; W15; Singles and doubles draws	(Japan) Naho Sato; 0–6, 6–4, 6–1	(China) Wu Meixu	(Italy) Samira De Stefano (Italy) Arianna Zucchini	(Italy) Elisa Andrea Camerano (Italy) Matilde Mariani (Italy) Tatiana Pieri (Serbia) Elena Milovanović
February 27	Monastir, Tunisia; Hard; W15; Singles and doubles draws	(China) Liu Fangzhou (Japan) Naho Sato; 6–4, 6–1	(Greece) Eleni Christofi (United States) Paris Corley	(Italy) Samira De Stefano (Italy) Arianna Zucchini	(Italy) Elisa Andrea Camerano (Italy) Matilde Mariani (Italy) Tatiana Pieri (Serbia) Elena Milovanović
February 27	Antalya, Turkey; Clay; W15; Singles and doubles draws	Daria Lodikova; 6–3, 7–6^{(7–2)}	(Italy) Alessandra Mazzola	(Japan) Miho Kuramochi (Greece) Dimitra Pavlou	(Switzerland) Katerina Tsygourova (Slovenia) Petja Drame; Daria Shadchneva (Serbia) Natalija Senić
February 27	Antalya, Turkey; Clay; W15; Singles and doubles draws	(Brazil) Ana Candiotto (Romania) Simona Ogescu; 6–3, 6–4	(Japan) Miho Kuramochi (Serbia) Bojana Marinković	(Japan) Miho Kuramochi (Greece) Dimitra Pavlou	(Switzerland) Katerina Tsygourova (Slovenia) Petja Drame; Daria Shadchneva (Serbia) Natalija Senić

=== March ===
Week of	Tournament	Winner	Runners-up	Semifinalists	Quarterfinalists
March 6	BeeTV Women's; Astana, Kazakhstan; Hard (indoor); W60; Singles – Doubles	(South Korea) Jang Su-jeong; 6–1, 6–4	(Japan) Moyuka Uchijima	Anastasia Zakharova; Polina Kudermetova	(Turkey) Zeynep Sönmez (France) Chloé Paquet; Iryna Shymanovich (Croatia) Tena Lukas
March 6	BeeTV Women's; Astana, Kazakhstan; Hard (indoor); W60; Singles – Doubles	Polina Kudermetova; Anastasia Tikhonova; 2–6, 6–3, [10–7]	(South Korea) Han Na-lae (South Korea) Jang Su-jeong	Anastasia Zakharova; Polina Kudermetova	(Turkey) Zeynep Sönmez (France) Chloé Paquet; Iryna Shymanovich (Croatia) Tena Lukas
March 6	Empire Women's Indoor; Trnava, Slovakia; Hard (indoor); W60; Singles – Doubles	(Czech Republic) Lucie Havlíčková; 3–6, 7–6^{(7–4)}, 7–5	(France) Océane Dodin	(Belgium) Greet Minnen (Ukraine) Daria Snigur	(Bulgaria) Viktoriya Tomova (Czech Republic) Barbora Palicová (United Kingdom) Sonay Kartal (Slovakia) Radka Zelníčková
March 6	Empire Women's Indoor; Trnava, Slovakia; Hard (indoor); W60; Singles – Doubles	(United Kingdom) Alicia Barnett (United Kingdom) Olivia Nicholls; 6–3, 6–3	Amina Anshba (Czech Republic) Anastasia Dețiuc	(Belgium) Greet Minnen (Ukraine) Daria Snigur	(Bulgaria) Viktoriya Tomova (Czech Republic) Barbora Palicová (United Kingdom) Sonay Kartal (Slovakia) Radka Zelníčková
March 6	Bangalore, India; Hard; W40; Singles and doubles draws	(Czech Republic) Brenda Fruhvirtová; 0–6, 6–4, 6–0	(India) Ankita Raina	(Slovenia) Dalila Jakupović (India) Rutuja Bhosale	(Indonesia) Priska Madelyn Nugroho (Japan) Ikumi Yamazaki (Bosnia and Herzegovina) Dea Herdželaš (United Kingdom) Eden Silva
March 6	Bangalore, India; Hard; W40; Singles and doubles draws	(Portugal) Francisca Jorge (Portugal) Matilde Jorge; 5–7, 6–0, [10–3]	(Greece) Valentini Grammatikopoulou (United Kingdom) Eden Silva	(Slovenia) Dalila Jakupović (India) Rutuja Bhosale	(Indonesia) Priska Madelyn Nugroho (Japan) Ikumi Yamazaki (Bosnia and Herzegovina) Dea Herdželaš (United Kingdom) Eden Silva
March 6	Fredericton, Canada; Hard (indoor); W25; Singles and doubles draws	(Czech Republic) Gabriela Knutson; 6–4, 6–4	(Japan) Himeno Sakatsume	(Slovakia) Viktória Morvayová (Canada) Stacey Fung	(Chinese Taipei) Hsu Chieh-yu (Canada) Martyna Ostrzygalo (United States) Raveena Kingsley (United States) Jamie Loeb
March 6	Fredericton, Canada; Hard (indoor); W25; Singles and doubles draws	(United States) Jessie Aney (United States) Dalayna Hewitt; 7–6^{(7–2)}, 6–4	(United States) Quinn Gleason (United States) Jamie Loeb	(Slovakia) Viktória Morvayová (Canada) Stacey Fung	(Chinese Taipei) Hsu Chieh-yu (Canada) Martyna Ostrzygalo (United States) Raveena Kingsley (United States) Jamie Loeb
March 6	Wiphold International; Pretoria, South Africa; Hard; W25; Singles and doubles draws	(United States) Emina Bektas; 3–6, 6–3, 7–6^{(8–6)}	(Israel) Lina Glushko	(Switzerland) Lulu Sun (Belgium) Sofia Costoulas	Alina Korneeva (France) Alice Robbe (Switzerland) Jenny Dürst (Japan) Mai Hontama
March 6	Wiphold International; Pretoria, South Africa; Hard; W25; Singles and doubles draws	(United States) Emina Bektas (Israel) Lina Glushko; 6–3, 4–6, [13–11]	(Hungary) Tímea Babos (Spain) Georgina García Pérez	(Switzerland) Lulu Sun (Belgium) Sofia Costoulas	Alina Korneeva (France) Alice Robbe (Switzerland) Jenny Dürst (Japan) Mai Hontama
March 6	Boca Raton, United States; Hard; W25; Singles and doubles draws	(Andorra) Victoria Jiménez Kasintseva; 6–2, 6–2	(United States) Whitney Osuigwe	(Argentina) María Lourdes Carlé (United States) Louisa Chirico	(United States) Makenna Jones (Switzerland) Joanne Züger (Argentina) Paula Ormaechea (United States) Grace Min
March 6	Boca Raton, United States; Hard; W25; Singles and doubles draws	(United States) Hailey Baptiste (United States) Whitney Osuigwe; 6–2, 6–2	(United States) Francesca Di Lorenzo (United States) Makenna Jones	(Argentina) María Lourdes Carlé (United States) Louisa Chirico	(United States) Makenna Jones (Switzerland) Joanne Züger (Argentina) Paula Ormaechea (United States) Grace Min
March 6	Sharm El Sheikh, Egypt; Hard; W15; Singles and doubles draws	(Slovakia) Katarína Kužmová; 6–3, 6–4	(United Kingdom) Emilie Lindh	Polina Iatcenko (South Korea) Back Da-yeon	(Romania) Karola Bejenaru (Egypt) Lamis Alhussein Abdel Aziz (Egypt) Merna Refaat (South Korea) Jeong Bo-young
March 6	Sharm El Sheikh, Egypt; Hard; W15; Singles and doubles draws	(Japan) Mei Hasegawa (Hong Kong) Wu Ho-ching; Walkover	Aglaya Fedorova (Slovakia) Katarína Kužmová	Polina Iatcenko (South Korea) Back Da-yeon	(Romania) Karola Bejenaru (Egypt) Lamis Alhussein Abdel Aziz (Egypt) Merna Refaat (South Korea) Jeong Bo-young
March 6	Amiens, France; Clay (indoor); W15; Singles and doubles draws	(Sweden) Caijsa Hennemann; 6–3, 6–1	(Belgium) Vicky Van de Peer	(China) Li Zongyu (France) Yaroslava Bartashevich	(France) Maneva Rakotomalala (Romania) Arina Vasilescu (Greece) Martha Matoula (South Korea) Ku Yeon-woo
March 6	Amiens, France; Clay (indoor); W15; Singles and doubles draws	(Greece) Martha Matoula (Romania) Arina Vasilescu; 6–2, 7–5	(France) Yaroslava Bartashevich (France) Diana Martynov	(China) Li Zongyu (France) Yaroslava Bartashevich	(France) Maneva Rakotomalala (Romania) Arina Vasilescu (Greece) Martha Matoula (South Korea) Ku Yeon-woo
March 6	Monastir, Tunisia; Hard; W15; Singles and doubles draws	(Japan) Naho Sato; 2–6, 6–4, 6–0	(United States) Paris Corley	(Germany) Anja Wildgruber (China) Liu Fangzhou	(Italy) Federica Di Sarra (United States) Kylie McKenzie (China) Yang Yidi (Netherlands) Anouk Koevermans
March 6	Monastir, Tunisia; Hard; W15; Singles and doubles draws	(Netherlands) Anouk Koevermans (Netherlands) Marente Sijbesma; 6–4, 6–3	(Italy) Angelica Raggi (Italy) Jennifer Ruggeri	(Germany) Anja Wildgruber (China) Liu Fangzhou	(Italy) Federica Di Sarra (United States) Kylie McKenzie (China) Yang Yidi (Netherlands) Anouk Koevermans
March 6	Antalya, Turkey; Clay; W15; Singles and doubles draws	(Bulgaria) Denislava Glushkova; 6–2, 6–4	(Serbia) Natalija Senić	(Turkey) İlay Yörük (Austria) Mavie Österreicher	(Netherlands) Rikke de Koning (Germany) Natalia Siedliska (Republic of Ireland) Celine Simunyu (Italy) Georgia Pedone
March 6	Antalya, Turkey; Clay; W15; Singles and doubles draws	(Brazil) Ana Candiotto (Germany) Natalia Siedliska; 6–3, 7–5	(Ukraine) Viktoriia Dema (Uzbekistan) Sevil Yuldasheva	(Turkey) İlay Yörük (Austria) Mavie Österreicher	(Netherlands) Rikke de Koning (Germany) Natalia Siedliska (Republic of Ireland) Celine Simunyu (Italy) Georgia Pedone
March 13	ACT Clay Court International; Canberra, Australia; Clay; W60; Singles – Doubles	(Australia) Priscilla Hon; 4–6, 6–2, 6–4	(Australia) Olivia Gadecki	(Slovenia) Dalila Jakupović (Japan) Haruka Kaji	(Australia) Petra Hule (Australia) Destanee Aiava (Chinese Taipei) Joanna Garland (Australia) Arina Rodionova
March 13	ACT Clay Court International; Canberra, Australia; Clay; W60; Singles – Doubles	(Australia) Elysia Bolton (Australia) Alexandra Bozovic; 4–6, 7–5, [13–11]	(Australia) Priscilla Hon (Slovenia) Dalila Jakupović	(Slovenia) Dalila Jakupović (Japan) Haruka Kaji	(Australia) Petra Hule (Australia) Destanee Aiava (Chinese Taipei) Joanna Garland (Australia) Arina Rodionova
March 13	Wiphold International; Pretoria, South Africa; Hard; W60; Singles – Doubles	Alina Korneeva; 6–3, 7–6^{(7–3)}	(Hungary) Tímea Babos	(Cyprus) Raluca Șerban (United States) Emina Bektas	(Switzerland) Lulu Sun (United States) Sachia Vickery (France) Manon Léonard (Turkey) İpek Öz
March 13	Wiphold International; Pretoria, South Africa; Hard; W60; Singles – Doubles	(Japan) Mai Hontama (France) Alice Tubello; 6–3, 6–3	(Belgium) Sofia Costoulas (Italy) Dalila Spiteri	(Cyprus) Raluca Șerban (United States) Emina Bektas	(Switzerland) Lulu Sun (United States) Sachia Vickery (France) Manon Léonard (Turkey) İpek Öz
March 13	Anapoima, Colombia; Clay; W40; Singles and doubles draws	(Netherlands) Arantxa Rus; 6–3, 6–7^{(3–7)}, 6–2	(Austria) Sinja Kraus	(Switzerland) Joanne Züger (France) Carole Monnet	(Bosnia and Herzegovina) Nefisa Berberović (Netherlands) Eva Vedder (Colombia) Yuliana Monroy (China) You Xiaodi
March 13	Anapoima, Colombia; Clay; W40; Singles and doubles draws	Irina Khromacheva (Ukraine) Valeriya Strakhova; 6–0, 1–6, [10–4]	(Venezuela) Andrea Gámiz (Netherlands) Eva Vedder	(Switzerland) Joanne Züger (France) Carole Monnet	(Bosnia and Herzegovina) Nefisa Berberović (Netherlands) Eva Vedder (Colombia) Yuliana Monroy (China) You Xiaodi
March 13	Říčany, Czech Republic; Hard (indoor); W40; Singles and doubles draws	(Croatia) Antonia Ružić; 6–4, 6–1	(Netherlands) Lesley Pattinama Kerkhove	(France) Jessika Ponchet (Germany) Mona Barthel	(France) Elsa Jacquemot (Serbia) Lola Radivojević (Croatia) Lea Bošković (Poland) Maja Chwalińska
March 13	Říčany, Czech Republic; Hard (indoor); W40; Singles and doubles draws	(Germany) Tayisiya Morderger (Germany) Yana Morderger; 6–1, 4–6, [10–6]	(Uzbekistan) Nigina Abduraimova; Alena Fomina-Klotz	(France) Jessika Ponchet (Germany) Mona Barthel	(France) Elsa Jacquemot (Serbia) Lola Radivojević (Croatia) Lea Bošković (Poland) Maja Chwalińska
March 13	Palma Nova, Spain; Clay; W25; Singles and doubles draws	(Spain) Guiomar Maristany; 6–4, 1–6, 6–1	(Spain) Rosa Vicens Mas	(Bulgaria) Gergana Topalova; Iryna Shymanovich	(Croatia) Tara Würth (Spain) Ariana Geerlings (Romania) Cristina Dinu (Liechtenstein) Kathinka von Deichmann
March 13	Palma Nova, Spain; Clay; W25; Singles and doubles draws	(Portugal) Francisca Jorge (Portugal) Matilde Jorge; 6–1, 3–6, [10–8]	(Georgia (country)) Ekaterine Gorgodze; Iryna Shymanovich	(Bulgaria) Gergana Topalova; Iryna Shymanovich	(Croatia) Tara Würth (Spain) Ariana Geerlings (Romania) Cristina Dinu (Liechtenstein) Kathinka von Deichmann
March 13	Sharm El Sheikh, Egypt; Hard; W15; Singles and doubles draws	(Slovakia) Katarína Kužmová; 6–2, 7–6^{(7–0)}	(Hong Kong) Wu Ho-ching	(Poland) Martyna Kubka; Polina Iatcenko	(Slovakia) Eszter Méri (Egypt) Lamis Alhussein Abdel Aziz (China) Wang Meiling (Slovakia) Radka Zelníčková
March 13	Sharm El Sheikh, Egypt; Hard; W15; Singles and doubles draws	Polina Iatcenko (Slovakia) Katarína Kužmová; 6–4, 6–0	(France) Pauline Courcoux (France) Camille Moga	(Poland) Martyna Kubka; Polina Iatcenko	(Slovakia) Eszter Méri (Egypt) Lamis Alhussein Abdel Aziz (China) Wang Meiling (Slovakia) Radka Zelníčková
March 13	Gonesse, France; Clay (indoor); W15; Singles and doubles draws	(Switzerland) Sandy Marti; 6–4, 6–1	(Germany) Antonia Schmidt	(Italy) Jessica Bertoldo (Italy) Enola Chiesa	(Spain) Marta González Encinas (Italy) Linda Salvi (France) Diana Martynov (Italy) Verena Meliss
March 13	Gonesse, France; Clay (indoor); W15; Singles and doubles draws	(Germany) Antonia Schmidt (Romania) Arina Vasilescu; 7–5, 6–3	(Switzerland) Karolina Kozakova; Evialina Laskevich	(Italy) Jessica Bertoldo (Italy) Enola Chiesa	(Spain) Marta González Encinas (Italy) Linda Salvi (France) Diana Martynov (Italy) Verena Meliss
March 13	Heraklion, Greece; Clay; W15; Singles and doubles draws	(Romania) Ilinca Amariei; 6–4, 6–1	(France) Sara Cakarevic	(Israel) Shavit Kimchi (Romania) Anca Todoni	(Italy) Irene Lavino (Romania) Lavinia Tănăsie (Germany) Fabienne Gettwart (Czech Republic) Ivana Šebestová
March 13	Heraklion, Greece; Clay; W15; Singles and doubles draws	(Lithuania) Patricija Paukštytė (Romania) Anca Todoni; 6–3, 6–7^{(7–9)}, [10–5]	(Israel) Shavit Kimchi (Slovakia) Nina Vargová	(Israel) Shavit Kimchi (Romania) Anca Todoni	(Italy) Irene Lavino (Romania) Lavinia Tănăsie (Germany) Fabienne Gettwart (Czech Republic) Ivana Šebestová
March 13	Jakarta, Indonesia; Hard; W15; Singles and doubles draws	(South Korea) Park So-hyun; 6–3, 6–3	Anastasia Kovaleva	(Chinese Taipei) Cho Yi-tsen (Japan) Risa Ushijima	(South Korea) Ahn Yu-jin (China) Li Zongyu (Chinese Taipei) Cho I-hsuan (Japan) Haruna Arakawa
March 13	Jakarta, Indonesia; Hard; W15; Singles and doubles draws	(Chinese Taipei) Cho I-hsuan (Chinese Taipei) Cho Yi-tsen; 5–7, 6–2, [10–4]	(Belgium) Eliessa Vanlangendonck (Belgium) Amelia Waligora	(Chinese Taipei) Cho Yi-tsen (Japan) Risa Ushijima	(South Korea) Ahn Yu-jin (China) Li Zongyu (Chinese Taipei) Cho I-hsuan (Japan) Haruna Arakawa
March 13	Monastir, Tunisia; Hard; W15; Singles and doubles draws	(France) Nina Radovanovic; 6–2, 6–3	(United States) Kylie McKenzie	(France) Yasmine Mansouri (Ukraine) Alisa Baranovska	(Italy) Angelica Raggi (China) Wang Jiaqi (Italy) Aurora Zantedeschi (Austria) Tamira Paszek
March 13	Monastir, Tunisia; Hard; W15; Singles and doubles draws	(United States) Dasha Ivanova (Italy) Angelica Raggi; 6–2, 6–4	(United States) Paris Corley (Chile) Fernanda Labraña	(France) Yasmine Mansouri (Ukraine) Alisa Baranovska	(Italy) Angelica Raggi (China) Wang Jiaqi (Italy) Aurora Zantedeschi (Austria) Tamira Paszek
March 13	Antalya, Turkey; Clay; W15; Singles and doubles draws	(Japan) Miho Kuramochi; 7–6^{(7–4)}, 6–4	(Czech Republic) Julie Štruplová	Daria Lodikova; Daria Shadchneva	(Turkey) İlay Yörük (Bulgaria) Denislava Glushkova (Belgium) Hanne Vandewinkel (Switzerland) Sebastianna Scilipoti
March 13	Antalya, Turkey; Clay; W15; Singles and doubles draws	(Brazil) Ana Candiotto; Daria Lodikova; 6–4, 6–4	(Italy) Virginia Ferrara (Italy) Giorgia Pedone	Daria Lodikova; Daria Shadchneva	(Turkey) İlay Yörük (Bulgaria) Denislava Glushkova (Belgium) Hanne Vandewinkel (Switzerland) Sebastianna Scilipoti
March 20	ACT Clay Court International; Canberra, Australia; Clay; W60; Singles – Doubles	(China) Wang Yafan; 3–6, 6–2, 6–0	(Australia) Olivia Gadecki	(Japan) Himeno Sakatsume (Australia) Petra Hule	(United Kingdom) Naiktha Bains (Australia) Maddison Inglis (Slovenia) Dalila Jakupović (Australia) Alana Parnaby
March 20	ACT Clay Court International; Canberra, Australia; Clay; W60; Singles – Doubles	(Japan) Erina Hayashi (Japan) Yuki Naito; 7–6^{(7–2)}, 7–5	(Australia) Destanee Aiava (Australia) Olivia Gadecki	(Japan) Himeno Sakatsume (Australia) Petra Hule	(United Kingdom) Naiktha Bains (Australia) Maddison Inglis (Slovenia) Dalila Jakupović (Australia) Alana Parnaby
March 20	Maribor, Slovenia; Hard (indoor); W40; Singles and doubles draws	(Japan) Mai Hontama; 6–4, 3–6, 6–4	(Denmark) Clara Tauson	(Ukraine) Katarina Zavatska (Slovenia) Veronika Erjavec	(Belgium) Yanina Wickmayer (Switzerland) Lulu Sun; Tatiana Prozorova; Anastasia Tikhonova
March 20	Maribor, Slovenia; Hard (indoor); W40; Singles and doubles draws	Sofya Lansere; Anastasia Tikhonova; 6–3, 6–2	(Romania) Irina Bara (Romania) Andreea Mitu	(Ukraine) Katarina Zavatska (Slovenia) Veronika Erjavec	(Belgium) Yanina Wickmayer (Switzerland) Lulu Sun; Tatiana Prozorova; Anastasia Tikhonova
March 20	Mosquera, Colombia; Clay; W25; Singles and doubles draws	(Austria) Sinja Kraus; 6–7^{(4–7)}, 7–6^{(8–6)}, 6–3	(Colombia) Emiliana Arango	(France) Emma Léné (Netherlands) Suzan Lamens	(Italy) Martina Colmegna (Bosnia and Herzegovina) Nefisa Berberović (France) Margaux Rouvroy (Ukraine) Valeriya Strakhova
March 20	Mosquera, Colombia; Clay; W25; Singles and doubles draws	Irina Khromacheva (Ukraine) Valeriya Strakhova; 5–7, 7–6^{(7–3)}, [10–8]	(Germany) Silvia Ambrosio (Germany) Lena Papadakis	(France) Emma Léné (Netherlands) Suzan Lamens	(Italy) Martina Colmegna (Bosnia and Herzegovina) Nefisa Berberović (France) Margaux Rouvroy (Ukraine) Valeriya Strakhova
March 20	Jakarta, Indonesia; Hard; W25; Singles and doubles draws	Anastasia Zakharova; 3–6, 6–3, 6–4	(China) Bai Zhuoxuan	(Croatia) Jana Fett (Hong Kong) Cody Wong	(China) Guo Hanyu (China) Ma Yexin (Thailand) Luksika Kumkhum (Thailand) Mananchaya Sawangkaew
March 20	Jakarta, Indonesia; Hard; W25; Singles and doubles draws	(China) Ma Yexin (Japan) Moyuka Uchijima; 6–0, 6–2	(Thailand) Luksika Kumkhum (Thailand) Peangtarn Plipuech	(Croatia) Jana Fett (Hong Kong) Cody Wong	(China) Guo Hanyu (China) Ma Yexin (Thailand) Luksika Kumkhum (Thailand) Mananchaya Sawangkaew
March 20	Palma Nova, Spain; Clay; W25; Singles and doubles draws	(Romania) Jaqueline Cristian; 6–4, 6–0	Iryna Shymanovich	(Spain) Leyre Romero Gormaz (Romania) Andreea Prisăcariu	(Romania) Alexandra Cadanțu-Ignatik (Romania) Miriam Bulgaru (Belgium) Marie Benoît (Georgia (country)) Ekaterine Gorgodze
March 20	Palma Nova, Spain; Clay; W25; Singles and doubles draws	(Portugal) Francisca Jorge (Portugal) Matilde Jorge; 2–6, 6–3, [10–8]	(Georgia (country)) Ekaterine Gorgodze; Iryna Shymanovich	(Spain) Leyre Romero Gormaz (Romania) Andreea Prisăcariu	(Romania) Alexandra Cadanțu-Ignatik (Romania) Miriam Bulgaru (Belgium) Marie Benoît (Georgia (country)) Ekaterine Gorgodze
March 20	Sharm El Sheikh, Egypt; Hard; W15; Singles and doubles draws	Polina Iatcenko; 6–4, 6–2	(Slovakia) Katarína Kužmová	(Italy) Sara Milanese (United States) Anna Ulyashchenko	(Slovakia) Radka Zelníčková (Slovakia) Renáta Jamrichová (United Kingdom) Jasmine Conway (Romania) Karola Bejenaru
March 20	Sharm El Sheikh, Egypt; Hard; W15; Singles and doubles draws	(Canada) Louise Kwong (United States) Anna Ulyashchenko; 3–6, 6–1, [10–5]	(Japan) Mei Hasegawa (Hong Kong) Wu Ho-ching	(Italy) Sara Milanese (United States) Anna Ulyashchenko	(Slovakia) Radka Zelníčková (Slovakia) Renáta Jamrichová (United Kingdom) Jasmine Conway (Romania) Karola Bejenaru
March 20	Le Havre, France; Clay (indoor); W15; Singles and doubles draws	(France) Loïs Boisson; 6–0, 4–6, 6–2	(France) Diana Martynov	(Ukraine) Veronika Podrez (Romania) Arina Vasilescu	(Switzerland) Fiona Ganz (Spain) Noelia Bouzó Zanotti (Spain) Alba Rey García (Australia) Tina Nadine Smith
March 20	Le Havre, France; Clay (indoor); W15; Singles and doubles draws	(Germany) Antonia Schmidt (Romania) Arina Vasilescu; 6–3, 6–2	(Spain) Noelia Bouzó Zanotti (Spain) Marta González Encinas	(Ukraine) Veronika Podrez (Romania) Arina Vasilescu	(Switzerland) Fiona Ganz (Spain) Noelia Bouzó Zanotti (Spain) Alba Rey García (Australia) Tina Nadine Smith
March 20	Heraklion, Greece; Clay; W15; Singles and doubles draws	(Romania) Ilinca Amariei; 6–4, 3–6, 6–2	(Germany) Fabienne Gettwart	(Latvia) Margarita Ignatjeva (Slovakia) Nina Vargová	(Israel) Shavit Kimchi (Italy) Martina Caregaro (Italy) Irene Lavino (Greece) Eleni Christofi
March 20	Heraklion, Greece; Clay; W15; Singles and doubles draws	(Greece) Eleni Christofi (Greece) Dimitra Pavlou; 7–5, 6–2	(Romania) Anastasia Safta (Romania) Lavinia Tănăsie	(Latvia) Margarita Ignatjeva (Slovakia) Nina Vargová	(Israel) Shavit Kimchi (Italy) Martina Caregaro (Italy) Irene Lavino (Greece) Eleni Christofi
March 20	Hinode, Japan; Hard; W15; Singles and doubles draws	(Japan) Natsumi Kawaguchi; 6–4, 6–3	(Japan) Aoi Ito	(Chinese Taipei) Tsao Chia-yi (Japan) Ayumi Koshiishi	(Japan) Moeka Miyata (Japan) Junri Namigata (Japan) Akiko Omae (Japan) Yuka Hosoki
March 20	Hinode, Japan; Hard; W15; Singles and doubles draws	(Japan) Akari Inoue (Chinese Taipei) Tsao Chia-yi; 6–4, 6–7^{(5–7)}, [10–5]	(Chinese Taipei) Li Yu-yun (Japan) Rinon Okuwaki	(Chinese Taipei) Tsao Chia-yi (Japan) Ayumi Koshiishi	(Japan) Moeka Miyata (Japan) Junri Namigata (Japan) Akiko Omae (Japan) Yuka Hosoki
March 20	Monastir, Tunisia; Hard; W15; Singles and doubles draws	(China) Liu Fangzhou; 6–2, 6–3	(Italy) Martina Spigarelli	(France) Nina Radovanovic (Serbia) Dejana Radanović	(United Kingdom) Abigail Amos (United States) Dasha Ivanova (United Kingdom) Amarni Banks (Italy) Giulia Crescenzi
March 20	Monastir, Tunisia; Hard; W15; Singles and doubles draws	(Switzerland) Naïma Karamoko (Bulgaria) Isabella Shinikova; 6–4, 3–6, [10–5]	(Chile) Fernanda Labraña (Serbia) Elena Milovanović	(France) Nina Radovanovic (Serbia) Dejana Radanović	(United Kingdom) Abigail Amos (United States) Dasha Ivanova (United Kingdom) Amarni Banks (Italy) Giulia Crescenzi
March 20	Antalya, Turkey; Clay; W15; Singles and doubles draws	Daria Lodikova; 4–6, 6–0, 6–2	(Czech Republic) Julie Štruplová	(Belgium) Hanne Vandewinkel (Turkey) İlay Yörük	(Italy) Georgia Pedone (Slovakia) Anika Jašková (Brazil) Ana Candiotto (Georgia (country)) Sofia Shapatava
March 20	Antalya, Turkey; Clay; W15; Singles and doubles draws	(Czech Republic) Denisa Hindová (Slovenia) Nika Radišić; 7–6^{(8–6)}, 6–3	(Turkey) Başak Eraydın (Japan) Yukina Saigo	(Belgium) Hanne Vandewinkel (Turkey) İlay Yörük	(Italy) Georgia Pedone (Slovakia) Anika Jašková (Brazil) Ana Candiotto (Georgia (country)) Sofia Shapatava
March 27	Open de Seine-et-Marne; Croissy-Beaubourg, France; Hard (indoor); W60; Singles – Doubles	(United Kingdom) Jodie Burrage; 3–6, 6–4, 6–0	(Italy) Lucia Bronzetti	(France) Margaux Rouvroy (Belgium) Yanina Wickmayer	Anastasia Pavlyuchenkova (France) Elsa Jacquemot (Belgium) Greet Minnen (Netherlands) Lesley Pattinama Kerkhove
March 27	Open de Seine-et-Marne; Croissy-Beaubourg, France; Hard (indoor); W60; Singles – Doubles	(Belgium) Greet Minnen (Belgium) Yanina Wickmayer; 6–4, 6–4	(United Kingdom) Jodie Burrage (Turkey) Berfu Cengiz	(France) Margaux Rouvroy (Belgium) Yanina Wickmayer	Anastasia Pavlyuchenkova (France) Elsa Jacquemot (Belgium) Greet Minnen (Netherlands) Lesley Pattinama Kerkhove
March 27	Murska Sobota, Slovenia; Hard (indoor); W40; Singles and doubles draws	(Belgium) Magali Kempen; 7–5, 7–5	Maria Timofeeva	(Slovakia) Rebecca Šramková (Croatia) Antonia Ružić	(Romania) Andreea Mitu; Tatiana Prozorova; Darya Astakhova (United Kingdom) Harriet Dart
March 27	Murska Sobota, Slovenia; Hard (indoor); W40; Singles and doubles draws	(United Kingdom) Harriet Dart (Romania) Andreea Mitu; Walkover	(Belgium) Magali Kempen (Switzerland) Xenia Knoll	(Slovakia) Rebecca Šramková (Croatia) Antonia Ružić	(Romania) Andreea Mitu; Tatiana Prozorova; Darya Astakhova (United Kingdom) Harriet Dart
March 27	Sopó, Colombia; Clay; W25; Singles and doubles draws	(France) Séléna Janicijevic; 6–4, 5–7, 6–4	(Netherlands) Suzan Lamens	(Latvia) Daniela Vismane (Argentina) Julia Riera	(Switzerland) Joanne Züger (Italy) Nuria Brancaccio (Germany) Silvia Ambrosio; Irina Khromacheva
March 27	Sopó, Colombia; Clay; W25; Singles and doubles draws	(Argentina) Guillermina Naya (Argentina) Julia Riera; 7–5, 6–4	(United States) Victoria Hu (Argentina) Melany Krywoj	(Latvia) Daniela Vismane (Argentina) Julia Riera	(Switzerland) Joanne Züger (Italy) Nuria Brancaccio (Germany) Silvia Ambrosio; Irina Khromacheva
March 27	Jakarta, Indonesia; Hard; W25; Singles and doubles draws	(China) Bai Zhuoxuan; 3–6, 6–0, 6–2	(India) Ankita Raina	(China) Guo Hanyu (China) Li Zongyu	(Japan) Moyuka Uchijima (China) Gao Xinyu (Switzerland) Jenny Dürst (Hong Kong) Cody Wong
March 27	Jakarta, Indonesia; Hard; W25; Singles and doubles draws	(China) Guo Hanyu (Hong Kong) Cody Wong; 6–2, 7–6^{(8–6)}	(South Korea) Choi Ji-hee (South Korea) Park So-hyun	(China) Guo Hanyu (China) Li Zongyu	(Japan) Moyuka Uchijima (China) Gao Xinyu (Switzerland) Jenny Dürst (Hong Kong) Cody Wong
March 27	Kōfu International Open; Kōfu, Japan; Hard; W25; Singles and doubles draws	(South Korea) Jang Su-jeong; 2–6, 6–3, 6–2	(South Korea) Han Na-lae	(China) Wang Yafan (Japan) Kyōka Okamura	(Japan) Haruka Kaji (Japan) Rina Saigo (Australia) Talia Gibson (Japan) Momoko Kobori
March 27	Kōfu International Open; Kōfu, Japan; Hard; W25; Singles and doubles draws	(South Korea) Han Na-lae (South Korea) Jang Su-jeong; 6–0, 6–4	(Spain) Georgina García Pérez (Japan) Eri Hozumi	(China) Wang Yafan (Japan) Kyōka Okamura	(Japan) Haruka Kaji (Japan) Rina Saigo (Australia) Talia Gibson (Japan) Momoko Kobori
March 27	Sharm El Sheikh, Egypt; Hard; W15; Singles and doubles draws	Polina Iatcenko; 6–2, 2–2 ret.	(United Kingdom) Emilie Lindh	(Germany) Lara Schmidt (United States) Jessica Failla	(Turkey) Ayla Aksu (Romania) Karola Bejenaru (China) Yao Xinxin (United Kingdom) Jasmine Conway
March 27	Sharm El Sheikh, Egypt; Hard; W15; Singles and doubles draws	(United Kingdom) Emilie Lindh; Aleksandra Pospelova; 6–2, 3–6, [11–9]	(United States) Jessica Failla (United States) Anna Ulyashchenko	(Germany) Lara Schmidt (United States) Jessica Failla	(Turkey) Ayla Aksu (Romania) Karola Bejenaru (China) Yao Xinxin (United Kingdom) Jasmine Conway
March 27	Monastir, Tunisia; Hard; W15; Singles and doubles draws	(Spain) Noelia Bouzó Zanotti; 6–3, 6–1	(Serbia) Elena Milovanović	(Bulgaria) Isabella Shinikova (Belgium) Amelie Van Impe	(Austria) Arabella Koller (Serbia) Dejana Radanović (Belgium) Clara Vlasselaer (United Kingdom) Amarni Banks
March 27	Monastir, Tunisia; Hard; W15; Singles and doubles draws	(Belgium) Amelie Van Impe (Belgium) Clara Vlasselaer; 6–0, 6–7^{(5–7)}, [11–9]	(Malta) Elaine Genovese (Vietnam) Savanna Lý-Nguyễn	(Bulgaria) Isabella Shinikova (Belgium) Amelie Van Impe	(Austria) Arabella Koller (Serbia) Dejana Radanović (Belgium) Clara Vlasselaer (United Kingdom) Amarni Banks
March 27	Antalya, Turkey; Clay; W15; Singles and doubles draws	(Kazakhstan) Zhibek Kulambayeva; 6–1, 6–3	(Czech Republic) Denisa Hindová	(Turkey) Başak Eraydın (Germany) Anne Schäfer	Anastasia Sukhotina (Serbia) Andrea Obradović (Georgia (country)) Sofia Shapatava (Greece) Martha Matoula
March 27	Antalya, Turkey; Clay; W15; Singles and doubles draws	(Kazakhstan) Zhibek Kulambayeva; Daria Lodikova; 6–1, 6–4	(Sweden) Jacqueline Cabaj Awad (Greece) Martha Matoula	(Turkey) Başak Eraydın (Germany) Anne Schäfer	Anastasia Sukhotina (Serbia) Andrea Obradović (Georgia (country)) Sofia Shapatava (Greece) Martha Matoula
