= 2023 Arcadia Women's Pro Open =

Tennis tournament

- Date: 27 February–5 March 2023
- Edition: 2nd
- Category: ITF Women's World Tennis Tour
- Prize money: $60,000
- Surface: Hard / Outdoor
- Location: Arcadia, United States

Champions

Singles
- (Italy) Sara Errani

Doubles
- (United States) Francesca Di Lorenzo / (United States) Christina Rosca
← 2022 ·	Arcadia Women's Pro Open	· 2024 →

The 2023 Arcadia Women's Pro Open was a professional tennis tournament played on outdoor hard courts. It was the second edition of the tournament, which was part of the 2023 ITF Women's World Tennis Tour. It took place in Arcadia, California, United States, between 27 February and 5 March 2023.

== Champions ==
=== Singles ===
- (Italy) Sara Errani def. (Netherlands) Arantxa Rus, walkover

=== Doubles ===
- (United States) Francesca Di Lorenzo / (United States) Christina Rosca def. (Japan) Rina Saigo / (Japan) Yukina Saigo, 6–1, 6–1

== Singles main draw entrants ==
=== Seeds ===
Country	Player	Rank	Seed
ITA	Sara Errani	106	1
FRA	Diane Parry	115	2
NED	Arantxa Rus	116	3
CRO	Petra Marčinko	174	4
HKG	Eudice Chong	233	5
USA	Sophie Chang	236	6
USA	Francesca Di Lorenzo	282	7
COL	Emiliana Arango	290	8

- Rankings are as of 20 February 2023.

=== Other entrants ===
The following players received wildcards into the singles main draw:

- (United States) Olivia Center
- (United States) Kimmi Hance
- (United States) Megan McCray
- (United States) Christina Rosca

The following player received entry into the singles main draw using a special ranking:

- (Colombia) Emiliana Arango

The following players received entry from the qualifying draw:

- (United States) Alyssa Ahn
- (United States) Kate Fakih
- (United States) Mary Lewis
- (United States) Shatoo Mohamad
- (Ukraine) Ganna Poznikhirenko
- (United States) Annette Robertson
- (United States) Esther Vyrlan
- (United States) Tianmei Wang
