= 2023 Arcadia Women's Pro Open – Doubles =

Doubles
- 2023 Arcadia Women's Pro Open

Final
- Champions: (United States) Francesca Di Lorenzo (United States) Christina Rosca
- Runners-up: (Japan) Rina Saigo (Japan) Yukina Saigo
- Score: 6–1, 6–1

Events
Singles	Doubles
← 2022 ·	Arcadia Women's Pro Open	· 2024 →

Ashlyn Krueger and Robin Montgomery were the defending champions but chose not to participate.

Francesca Di Lorenzo and Christina Rosca won the title, defeating Rina Saigo and Yukina Saigo in the final, 6–1, 6–1.

== Seeds ==
1. (United States) Sophie Chang / (Netherlands) Arantxa Rus (first round, withdrew)
2. (United States) Francesca Di Lorenzo / (United States) Christina Rosca (champions)
3. (United States) Adriana Reami / (United States) Anna Rogers (semifinals)
4. (Japan) Mana Ayukawa / (Hong Kong) Eudice Chong (quarterfinals)

== Draw ==
=== Key ===
- Q = Qualifier
- WC = Wild card
- LL = Lucky loser
- Alt = Alternate
- SE = Special exempt
- PR = Protected ranking
- ITF = ITF entry
- JE = Junior exempt
- w/o = Walkover
- r = Retired
- d = Defaulted
- SR = Special ranking

First round
1	(United States) S Chang (Netherlands) A Rus
(Japan) R Saigo (Japan) Y Saigo	w/o
(Armenia) Z Harutyunyan (United States) T Watumull	4	3
(France) E Mazzoni (France) J Mazzoni	6	6
4	(Japan) M Ayukawa (Hong Kong) E Chong	6	6
(Czech Republic) V Bervid (United Kingdom) A James	0	0
(Bulgaria) D Evtimova (Ukraine) G Poznikhirenko	1	6	[5]
(United States) A Ahn (United States) J Bernales	6	2	[10]
(United States) L Rose (United States) M Rose	0	1
(United States) J Hart (United States) R McAdoo	6	6
(United States) B Chiu (United States) T Mar	0	7^{7}	[4]
3	(United States) A Reami (United States) A Rogers	6	6^{5}	[10]
WC	(United States) L Friedman (Brazil) E Piai	7	6
(United States) M Lewis (United States) E Vyrlan	5	4
(United States) M McCray (United States) B Walker	0	6	[6]
2	(United States) F Di Lorenzo (United States) C Rosca	6	3	[10]

Quarterfinals
(Japan) R Saigo (Japan) Y Saigo	6	6
(France) E Mazzoni (France) J Mazzoni	4	1
4	(Japan) M Ayukawa (Hong Kong) E Chong	2	5
(United States) A Ahn (United States) J Bernales	6	7
(United States) J Hart (United States) R McAdoo	4	2
3	(United States) A Reami (United States) A Rogers	6	6
WC	(United States) L Friedman (Brazil) E Piai	2	5
2	(United States) F Di Lorenzo (United States) C Rosca	6	7

Semifinals
(Japan) R Saigo (Japan) Y Saigo	6	6
(United States) A Ahn (United States) J Bernales	2	3
3	(United States) A Reami (United States) A Rogers	6	4	[3]
2	(United States) F Di Lorenzo (United States) C Rosca	3	6	[10]

Final
(Japan) R Saigo (Japan) Y Saigo	1	1
2	(United States) F Di Lorenzo (United States) C Rosca	6	6
