= 2023 Arcadia Women's Pro Open – Singles =

Singles
- 2023 Arcadia Women's Pro Open

Final
- Champion: (Italy) Sara Errani
- Runner-up: (Netherlands) Arantxa Rus
- Score: Walkover

Events
Singles	Doubles
← 2022 ·	Arcadia Women's Pro Open	· 2024 →

Rebecca Marino was the defending champion but chose not to participate.

Sara Errani won the title after Arantxa Rus withdrew before the final.

== Seeds ==
1. (Italy) Sara Errani (champion)
2. (France) Diane Parry (semifinals)
3. (Netherlands) Arantxa Rus (final, withdrew)
4. (Croatia) Petra Marčinko (second round)
5. (Hong Kong) Eudice Chong (second round)
6. (United States) Sophie Chang (quarterfinals)
7. (United States) Francesca Di Lorenzo (first round)
8. (Colombia) Emiliana Arango (first round)

== Draw ==
=== Key ===
- Q = Qualifier
- WC = Wild card
- LL = Lucky loser
- Alt = Alternate
- SE = Special exempt
- PR = Protected ranking
- ITF = ITF entry
- JE = Junior exempt
- w/o = Walkover
- r = Retired
- d = Defaulted
- SR = Special ranking

=== Finals ===
Semifinals
1	(Italy) Sara Errani	6	3	7
4	(Croatia) Petra Marčinko	0	6	5
3	(Netherlands) Arantxa Rus	6	6
2	(France) Diane Parry	3	2

Final
1	(Italy) Sara Errani	w/o
3	(Netherlands) Arantxa Rus

=== Top half ===
First round
1	(Italy) S Errani	6	6
WC	(United States) C Rosca	0	2
(United States) A Rogers	4	6	6
(Slovakia) S Milatová	6	0	1
(Japan) R Saigo	2	6	6
(United States) R McAdoo	6	4	4
Q	(United States) T Wang	6	2	6^{5}
5	(Hong Kong) E Chong	3	6	7^{7}
4	(Croatia) P Marčinko	6	6
(Japan) M Ayukawa	2	3
(United States) H Chang	6	6
(United States) A Reami	3	1
Q	(Ukraine) G Poznikhirenko	6	4	6
Q	(United States) E Vyrlan	1	6	1
WC	(United States) M McCray	6	6
8/SR	(Colombia) E Arango	4	2

Second round
1	(Italy) S Errani	6	6
(United States) A Rogers	0	1
(Japan) R Saigo	6	7
5	(Hong Kong) E Chong	3	5
4	(Croatia) P Marčinko	6	6
(United States) H Chang	4	3
Q	(Ukraine) G Poznikhirenko	6^{1}	3
WC	(United States) M McCray	7^{7}	6

Quarterfinals
1	(Italy) S Errani	6	6
(Japan) R Saigo	1	0
4	(Croatia) P Marčinko	6	6
WC	(United States) M McCray	2	2

Semifinals
1	(Italy) S Errani	6	3	7
4	(Croatia) P Marčinko	0	6	5

=== Bottom half ===
First round
6	(United States) S Chang	7	6
Q	(United States) S Mohamad	5	1
Q	(United States) M Lewis	1	6	3
(United States) V Wolff	6	4	6
(United States) A Blokhina	6	6
Q	(United States) A Ahn	2	1
Q	(United States) K Fakih	4	2
3	(Netherlands) A Rus	6	6
7	(United States) F Di Lorenzo	5	3
(Japan) E Shibahara	7	6
WC	(United States) K Hance	7	6
(Bulgaria) D Evtimova	5	2
Q	(United States) A Robertson	0	3
(United States) M Sieg	6	6
WC	(United States) O Center	1	1
2	(France) D Parry	6	6

Second round
6	(United States) S Chang	6	6
(United States) V Wolff	4	2
(United States) A Blokhina	4	3
3	(Netherlands) A Rus	6	6
(Japan) E Shibahara	6	3	6
WC	(United States) K Hance	1	6	2
(United States) M Sieg	4	0
2	(France) D Parry	6	6

Quarterfinals
6	(United States) S Chang	2	6	4
3	(Netherlands) A Rus	6	4	6
(Japan) E Shibahara	7	6^{5}	3
2	(France) D Parry	5	7^{7}	6

Semifinals
3	(Netherlands) A Rus	6	6
2	(France) D Parry	3	2
