= 2025 US Open – Women's singles =

Tennis championship

Women's singles
- 2025 US Open

Final
- Champion: Aryna Sabalenka
- Runner-up: (United States) Amanda Anisimova
- Score: 6–3, 7–6^{(7–3)}
- Date: September 6, 2025

Details
- Draw: 128 (16Q / 8WC)
- Seeds: 32

Events
Singles	men	women		boys	girls
Doubles	men	women	mixed	boys	girls
WC Singles	men	women	quad	boys	girls
WC Doubles	men	women	quad	boys	girls

Qualification
Singles	men	women
- US Open

Defending champion Aryna Sabalenka defeated Amanda Anisimova in the final, 6–3, 7–6^{(7–3)} to win the women's singles tennis title at the 2025 US Open. It was her second US Open singles title and fourth major singles title overall. Sabalenka was the first woman to defend the title since Serena Williams in 2014. She retained the world No. 1 singles ranking after reaching the quarterfinals; Iga Świątek and Coco Gauff were also in contention for the top ranking at the beginning of the tournament.

For the third time at a major in the Open Era, all eight quarterfinalists had previously reached the final of a major, along with the 1976 and 1981 Wimbledon Championships.

Victoria Jiménez Kasintseva became the first Andorran player to compete in a major main draw. Alexandra Eala became the first Filipino player in the Open Era to win a singles main draw match at a major. Renata Zarazúa became the first Mexican woman to ever defeat a Top 10 opponent at the US Open.

Aged 45, Venus Williams was the oldest woman to compete in the US Open singles main draw since Renée Richards in 1981, after receiving a wildcard into the main draw.

This tournament marked the final professional appearances of former world No. 2 and two-time Wimbledon champion Petra Kvitová, who lost in the first round to Diane Parry, and former world No. 4 and WTA Finals champion Caroline Garcia, who lost in the first round to Kamilla Rakhimova.

== Seeds ==
1. Aryna Sabalenka (champion)
2. (Poland) Iga Świątek (quarterfinals)
3. (United States) Coco Gauff (fourth round)
4. (United States) Jessica Pegula (semifinals)
5. Mirra Andreeva (third round)
6. (United States) Madison Keys (first round)
7. (Italy) Jasmine Paolini (third round)
8. (United States) Amanda Anisimova (final)
9. (Kazakhstan) Elena Rybakina (fourth round)
10. (United States) Emma Navarro (third round)
11. (Czech Republic) Karolína Muchová (quarterfinals)
12. (Ukraine) Elina Svitolina (first round)
13. Ekaterina Alexandrova (fourth round)
14. (Denmark) Clara Tauson (first round)
15. (Australia) Daria Kasatkina (third round)
16. (Switzerland) Belinda Bencic (second round)
17. Liudmila Samsonova (second round)
18. (Brazil) Beatriz Haddad Maia (fourth round)
19. (Belgium) Elise Mertens (third round)
20. Diana Shnaider (first round)
21. (Czech Republic) Linda Nosková (third round)
22. (Canada) Victoria Mboko (first round)
23. (Japan) Naomi Osaka (semifinals)
24. Veronika Kudermetova (first round)
25. (Latvia) Jeļena Ostapenko (second round)
26. (United States) Sofia Kenin (first round)
27. (Ukraine) Marta Kostyuk (fourth round)
28. (Poland) Magdalena Fręch (third round)
29. Anna Kalinskaya (third round)
30. (Ukraine) Dayana Yastremska (first round)
31. (Canada) Leylah Fernandez (third round)
32. (United States) McCartney Kessler (second round)

Click on the seed number of a player to go to their draw section.

== Draw ==
Key

- Q = Qualifier
- WC = Wild card
- LL = Lucky loser
- Alt = Alternate
- ITF = ITF entry
- PR = Protected ranking
- SR = Special ranking
- SE = Special exempt
- JE = Junior exempt
- JR = Junior Accelerator Programme entrant
- CO = College Accelerator Programme entrant
- NG = Next Gen Accelerator Program entrant
- w/o = Walkover
- r = Retired
- d = Defaulted

=== Finals ===
Quarterfinals
1	Aryna Sabalenka	w/o
(Czech Republic) Markéta Vondroušová
4	(United States) Jessica Pegula	6	6
(Czech Republic) Barbora Krejčíková	3	3
11	(Czech Republic) Karolína Muchová	4	6^{3}
23	(Japan) Naomi Osaka	6	7^{7}
8	(United States) Amanda Anisimova	6	6
2	(Poland) Iga Świątek	4	3

Semifinals
1	Aryna Sabalenka	4	6	6
4	(United States) Jessica Pegula	6	3	4
23	(Japan) Naomi Osaka	7^{7}	6^{3}	3
8	(United States) Amanda Anisimova	6^{4}	7^{7}	6

Final
1	Aryna Sabalenka	6	7^{7}
8	(United States) Amanda Anisimova	3	6^{3}

=== Top half ===
==== Section 1 ====
First round
1	A Sabalenka	7	6
(Switzerland) R Masarova	5	1
(Spain) N Párrizas Díaz	2^{r}
P Kudermetova	2
(France) E Jacquemot	6	6
(Czech Republic) M Bouzková	4	3
Q	(Canada) R Marino	2	1
31	(Canada) L Fernandez	6	6
19	(Belgium) E Mertens	6	6
WC	(United States) A Ahn	1	0
(New Zealand) L Sun	6	2	6
(Colombia) C Osorio	4	6	0
(Spain) C Bucșa	6	6
Q	(United States) C Liu	2	1
(Philippines) A Eala	6	2	7^{13}
14	(Denmark) C Tauson	3	6	6^{11}

Second round
1	A Sabalenka	7^{7}	6
P Kudermetova	6^{4}	2
(France) E Jacquemot	6	3	2
31	(Canada) L Fernandez	2	6	6
19	(Belgium) E Mertens	6	6
(New Zealand) L Sun	2	3
(Spain) C Bucșa	6	6
(Philippines) A Eala	4	3

Third round
1	A Sabalenka	6	7^{7}
31	(Canada) L Fernandez	3	6^{2}
19	(Belgium) E Mertens	6	5	3
(Spain) C Bucșa	3	7	6

Fourth round
1	A Sabalenka	6	6
(Spain) C Bucșa	1	4

==== Section 2 ====
First round
9	(Kazakhstan) E Rybakina	6	6
WC	(United States) J Pareja	3	0
(Italy) L Bronzetti	3	6	4
Q	(Czech Republic) T Valentová	6	3	6
(United Kingdom) E Raducanu	6	6
Q	(Japan) E Shibahara	1	2
Q	(Indonesia) J Tjen	6	4	6
24	V Kudermetova	4	6	4
32	(United States) M Kessler	7	7
(Poland) M Linette	5	5
Q	O Selekhmeteva	3	6^{3}
(Czech Republic) M Vondroušová	6	7^{7}
A Sasnovich	6^{6}	3
(United States) I Jovic	7^{8}	6
Q	(Australia) D Aiava	2	6^{4}
7	(Italy) J Paolini	6	7^{7}

Second round
9	(Kazakhstan) E Rybakina	6	7^{9}
Q	(Czech Republic) T Valentová	3	6^{7}
(United Kingdom) E Raducanu	6	6
Q	(Indonesia) J Tjen	2	1
32	(United States) M Kessler	6^{7}	2
(Czech Republic) M Vondroušová	7^{9}	6
(United States) I Jovic	3	3
7	(Italy) J Paolini	6	6

Third round
9	(Kazakhstan) E Rybakina	6	6
(United Kingdom) E Raducanu	1	2
(Czech Republic) M Vondroušová	7^{7}	6
7	(Italy) J Paolini	6^{4}	1

Fourth round
9	(Kazakhstan) E Rybakina	4	7	2
(Czech Republic) M Vondroušová	6	5	6

==== Section 3 ====
First round
4	(United States) J Pegula	6	6
(Egypt) M Sherif	0	4
(Ukraine) Y Starodubtseva	3	1
A Blinkova	6	6
V Azarenka	7^{7}	6
Q	(United States) H Inoue	6^{0}	4
A Pavlyuchenkova	6^{5}	7^{7}	6
30	(Ukraine) D Yastremska	7^{7}	6^{5}	4
17	L Samsonova	2	6	6
(China) Y Yuan	6	4	4
(France) L Jeanjean	3	5
Q	(Australia) P Hon	6	7
(United States) A Li	4	6	6
(Slovakia) R Šramková	6	2	4
Q	(China) S Zhang	3	3
16	(Switzerland) B Bencic	6	6

Second round
4	(United States) J Pegula	6	6
A Blinkova	1	3
V Azarenka	6	6
A Pavlyuchenkova	3	3
17	L Samsonova	6	3	2
Q	(Australia) P Hon	4	6	6
(United States) A Li	6	6
16	(Switzerland) B Bencic	3	3

Third round
4	(United States) J Pegula	6	7
V Azarenka	1	5
Q	(Australia) P Hon	5	3
(United States) A Li	7	6

Fourth round
4	(United States) J Pegula	6	6
(United States) A Li	1	2

==== Section 4 ====
First round
10	(United States) E Navarro	7^{11}	6
PR	(China) Y Wang	6^{9}	3
(Switzerland) J Teichmann	2	2
WC	(United States) C McNally	6	6
(Japan) M Uchijima	7^{7}	4	7^{11}
(Serbia) O Danilović	6^{2}	6	6^{9}
(Czech Republic) B Krejčíková	6	6
22	(Canada) V Mboko	3	2
25	(Latvia) J Ostapenko	6	6
Q	(China) Xiy Wang	4	3
(United States) T Townsend	6	6
(Croatia) A Ružić	4	4
A Potapova	6	4	6
PR	(China) L Zhu	4	6	2
(United States) A Parks	0	1
5	M Andreeva	6	6

Second round
10	(United States) E Navarro	6	6
WC	(United States) C McNally	2	1
(Japan) M Uchijima	4	2
(Czech Republic) B Krejčíková	6	6
25	(Latvia) J Ostapenko	5	1
(United States) T Townsend	7	6
A Potapova	1	3
5	M Andreeva	6	6

Third round
10	(United States) E Navarro	6	4	4
(Czech Republic) B Krejčíková	4	6	6
(United States) T Townsend	7	6
5	M Andreeva	5	2

Fourth round
(Czech Republic) B Krejčíková	1	7^{15}	6
(United States) T Townsend	6	6^{13}	3

=== Bottom half ===
==== Section 5 ====
First round
6	(United States) M Keys	7^{12}	6^{3}	5
(Mexico) R Zarazúa	6^{10}	7^{7}	7
PR	(Czech Republic) P Kvitová	1	0
(France) D Parry	6	6
Q	(United States) K Volynets	3	4
(Turkey) Z Sönmez	6	6
(United Kingdom) K Boulter	4	4
27	(Ukraine) M Kostyuk	6	6
21	(Czech Republic) L Nosková	6	7
Q	(Hungary) D Gálfi	4	5
Q	(United Kingdom) F Jones	0	5
(Germany) E Lys	6	7
PR	(Romania) S Cîrstea	7	6
(Argentina) S Sierra	5	0
WC	(United States) V Williams	3	6	1
11	(Czech Republic) K Muchová	6	2	6

Second round
(Mexico) R Zarazúa	2	6	6^{7}
(France) D Parry	6	2	7^{10}
(Turkey) Z Sönmez	5	7^{7}	3
27	(Ukraine) M Kostyuk	7	6^{5}	6
21	(Czech Republic) L Nosková	6	3
(Germany) E Lys	4	0^{r}
PR	(Romania) S Cîrstea	6^{0}	7^{7}	4
11	(Czech Republic) K Muchová	7^{7}	6^{3}	6

Third round
(France) D Parry	6	4	2
27	(Ukraine) M Kostyuk	3	6	6
21	(Czech Republic) L Nosková	7^{7}	4	2
11	(Czech Republic) K Muchová	6^{5}	6	6

Fourth round
27	(Ukraine) M Kostyuk	3	7^{7}	3
11	(Czech Republic) K Muchová	6	6^{0}	6

==== Section 6 ====
First round
15	(Australia) D Kasatkina	7	6
(Romania) E-G Ruse	5	1
K Rakhimova	6	4	6
WC	(France) C Garcia	4	6	3
(United States) H Baptiste	7	6
(Czech Republic) K Siniaková	5	3
(Belgium) G Minnen	3	4
23	(Japan) N Osaka	6	6
28	(Poland) M Fręch	6	6
WC	(Australia) T Gibson	2	2
Q	(Latvia) D Semeņistaja	5	0
(United States) P Stearns	7	6
(Croatia) D Vekić	3	7	6
(Spain) J Bouzas Maneiro	6	5	3
(Australia) A Tomljanović	4	7^{7}	5
3	(United States) C Gauff	6	6^{2}	7

Second round
15	(Australia) D Kasatkina	6	4	7
K Rakhimova	2	6	5
(United States) H Baptiste	3	1
23	(Japan) N Osaka	6	6
28	(Poland) M Fręch	6^{6}	6	6
(United States) P Stearns	7^{8}	3	2
(Croatia) D Vekić	6^{5}	2
3	(United States) C Gauff	7^{7}	6

Third round
15	(Australia) D Kasatkina	0	6	3
23	(Japan) N Osaka	6	4	6
28	(Poland) M Fręch	3	1
3	(United States) C Gauff	6	6

Fourth round
23	(Japan) N Osaka	6	6
3	(United States) C Gauff	3	2

==== Section 7 ====
First round
8	(United States) A Anisimova	6	6
(Australia) K Birrell	3	2
Q	(Andorra) V Jiménez Kasintseva	4	6^{6}
(Australia) M Joint	6	7^{8}
(United States) D Collins	2	0
(Romania) J Cristian	6	6
(United States) A Krueger	5	6	6
26	(United States) S Kenin	7	4	2
18	(Brazil) B Haddad Maia	6	1	6
(United Kingdom) S Kartal	3	6	1
(France) L Boisson	6	6^{3}	2
(Switzerland) V Golubic	3	7^{7}	6
(Greece) M Sakkari	6	6
(Germany) T Maria	3	2
(Hungary) A Bondár	6	6
12	(Ukraine) E Svitolina	2	4

Second round
8	(United States) A Anisimova	7^{7}	6
(Australia) M Joint	6^{2}	2
(Romania) J Cristian	4	6	6
(United States) A Krueger	6	2	2
18	(Brazil) B Haddad Maia	6	6
(Switzerland) V Golubic	1	4
(Greece) M Sakkari	6	6
(Hungary) A Bondár	3	1

Third round
8	(United States) A Anisimova	6	4	6
(Romania) J Cristian	4	6	2
18	(Brazil) B Haddad Maia	6	6
(Greece) M Sakkari	1	2

Fourth round
8	(United States) A Anisimova	6	6
18	(Brazil) B Haddad Maia	0	3

==== Section 8 ====
First round
13	E Alexandrova	6	6
PR	(Latvia) A Sevastova	4	1
(United States) C Dolehide	6	4	2
(China) Xin Wang	2	6	6
A Zakharova	6	6
(Armenia) E Avanesyan	3	4
(Germany) L Siegemund	7^{7}	2	6
20	D Shnaider	6^{3}	6	3
29	A Kalinskaya	6	5	6
WC	(United States) C Ngounoue	0	7	4
(Kazakhstan) Y Putintseva	6	7^{7}
(Italy) E Cocciaretto	4	6^{4}
(Netherlands) S Lamens	6	6
WC	(United States) V Glozman	4	2
(Colombia) E Arango	1	2
2	(Poland) I Świątek	6	6

Second round
13	E Alexandrova	6	6
(China) Xin Wang	2	2
A Zakharova	4	2
(Germany) L Siegemund	6	6
29	A Kalinskaya	6	7
(Kazakhstan) Y Putintseva	1	5
(Netherlands) S Lamens	1	6	4
2	(Poland) I Świątek	6	4	6

Third round
13	E Alexandrova	6	6
(Germany) L Siegemund	0	1
29	A Kalinskaya	6^{2}	4
2	(Poland) I Świątek	7^{7}	6

Fourth round
13	E Alexandrova	3	1
2	(Poland) I Świątek	6	6

== Championship match statistics ==
Category	Sabalenka	(United States) Anisimova
1st serve %	45/69 (65%)	38/66 (58%)
1st serve points won	27 of 45 = 60%	22 of 38 = 58%
2nd serve points won	15 of 24 = 63%	10 of 28 = 36%
Total service points won	42 of 69 = 60.87%	32 of 66 = 48.48%
Aces	1	4
Double faults	2	7
Winners	13	22
Unforced errors	15	29
Net points won	3 of 4 = 75%	2 of 4 = 50%
Break points converted	5 of 6 = 83%	4 of 7 = 57%
Return points won	34 of 66 = 52%	27 of 69 = 39%
Total points won	76	59

== Seeded players ==
The following are the seeded players, based on WTA rankings as of August 18, 2025. Rankings and points before are as of August 25, 2025.

Seed	Rank	Player	Points before	Points defending	Points won	Points after	Status
1	1	Aryna Sabalenka	11,225	2,000	2,000	11,225	Champion, defeated (United States) Amanda Anisimova [8]
2	2	(Poland) Iga Świątek	7,933	430	430	7,933	Quarterfinals lost to (United States) Amanda Anisimova [8]
3	3	(United States) Coco Gauff	7,874	240	240	7,874	Fourth round lost to (Japan) Naomi Osaka [23]
4	4	(United States) Jessica Pegula	4,903	1,300	780	4,383	Semifinals lost to Aryna Sabalenka [1]
5	5	Mirra Andreeva	4,733	70	130	4,793	Third round lost to (United States) Taylor Townsend
6	6	(United States) Madison Keys	4,699	130	10	4,579	First round lost to (Mexico) Renata Zarazúa
7	8	(Italy) Jasmine Paolini	4,116	240	130	4,006	Third round lost to (Czech Republic) Markéta Vondroušová
8	9	(United States) Amanda Anisimova	3,869	10	1,300	5,159	Runner-up, lost to Aryna Sabalenka [1]
9	10	(Kazakhstan) Elena Rybakina	3,663	70	240	3,833	Fourth round lost to (Czech Republic) Markéta Vondroušová
10	11	(United States) Emma Navarro	2,960	780	130	2,310	Third round lost to (Czech Republic) Barbora Krejčíková
11	13	(Czech Republic) Karolína Muchová	2,838	780	430	2,488	Quarterfinals lost to (Japan) Naomi Osaka [23]
12	15	(Ukraine) Elina Svitolina	2,726	130	10	2,606	First round lost to (Hungary) Anna Bondár
13	12	Ekaterina Alexandrova	2,916	130	240	3,026	Fourth round lost to (Poland) Iga Świątek [2]
14	14	(Denmark) Clara Tauson	2,781	70	10	2,721	First round lost to (Philippines) Alexandra Eala
15	18	(Australia) Daria Kasatkina	2,361	70	130	2,421	Third round lost to (Japan) Naomi Osaka [23]
16	19	(Switzerland) Belinda Bencic	2,265	(1)^{†}	70	2,334	Second round lost to (United States) Ann Li
17	20	Liudmila Samsonova	2,219	240	70	2,049	Second round lost to (Australia) Priscilla Hon [Q]
18	22	(Brazil) Beatriz Haddad Maia	1,921	430	240	1,731	Fourth round lost to (United States) Amanda Anisimova [8]
19	21	(Belgium) Elise Mertens	2,129	240	130	2,019	Third round lost to (Spain) Cristina Bucșa
20	17	Diana Shnaider	2,476	240	10	2,246	First round lost to (Germany) Laura Siegemund
21	32	(Czech Republic) Linda Nosková	1,550	10	130	1,670	Third round lost to (Czech Republic) Karolína Muchová [11]
22	23	(Canada) Victoria Mboko	1,834	(3)^{‡}	10	1,841	First round lost to (Czech Republic) Barbora Krejčíková
23	24	(Japan) Naomi Osaka	1,779	70	780	2,489	Semifinals lost to (United States) Amanda Anisimova [8]
24	25	Veronika Kudermetova	1,763	10	10	1,763	First round lost to (Indonesia) Janice Tjen [Q]
25	26	(Latvia) Jeļena Ostapenko	1,720	10	70	1,780	Second round lost to (United States) Taylor Townsend
26	27	(United States) Sofia Kenin	1,708	70	10	1,648	First round lost to (United States) Ashlyn Krueger
27	28	(Ukraine) Marta Kostyuk	1,656	130	240	1,766	Fourth round lost to (Czech Republic) Karolína Muchová [11]
28	33	(Poland) Magdalena Fręch	1,528	10	130	1,648	Third round lost to (United States) Coco Gauff [3]
29	29	Anna Kalinskaya	1,582	130	130	1,582	Third round lost to (Poland) Iga Świątek [2]
30	31	(Ukraine) Dayana Yastremska	1,559	10	10	1,559	First round lost to Anastasia Pavlyuchenkova
31	30	(Canada) Leylah Fernandez	1,564	10	130	1,684	Third round lost to Aryna Sabalenka [1]
32	41	(United States) McCartney Kessler	1,310	10	70	1,370	Second round lost to (Czech Republic) Markéta Vondroušová

† The player did not qualify for the tournament in 2024. Points for her 18th best result will be deducted instead.
‡ The player did not qualify for the tournament in 2024. She is defending points from an ITF tournament (Vienna) instead.

=== Withdrawn seeded players ===
The following players would have been seeded, but withdrew before the tournament began.

Rank	Player	Points before	Points dropping	Points after	Withdrawal reason
7	(China) Zheng Qinwen	4,433	430	4,003	Right elbow injury
16	(Spain) Paula Badosa	2,564	430	2,134	Back injury

== Other entry information ==
=== Wildcards ===
- (United States) Alyssa Ahn
- (France) Caroline Garcia
- (Australia) Talia Gibson
- (United States) Valerie Glozman
- (United States) Brooke Liviytt
- (United States) Clervie Ngounoue
- (United States) Julieta Pareja
- (United States) Venus Williams

=== Protected ranking ===
- (Czech Republic) Petra Kvitová (14)
- (Romania) Sorana Cîrstea (37)
- (China) Zhu Lin (50)
- (Latvia) Anastasija Sevastova (65)
- (China) Wang Yafan (71)

=== Qualifiers ===
- (Australia) Destanee Aiava
- (Hungary) Dalma Gálfi
- (Australia) Priscilla Hon
- (United States) Hina Inoue
- (Andorra) Victoria Jiménez Kasintseva
- (United Kingdom) Francesca Jones
- (United States) Claire Liu
- (Canada) Rebecca Marino
- Oksana Selekhmeteva
- (Latvia) Darja Semeņistaja
- (Japan) Ena Shibahara
- (Indonesia) Janice Tjen
- (Czech Republic) Tereza Valentová
- (United States) Katie Volynets
- (China) Wang Xiyu
- (China) Zhang Shuai

=== Withdrawals ===
The entry list was released based on the WTA rankings for the week of July 14, 2025.

- † (Tunisia) Ons Jabeur (71) → replaced by (Egypt) Mayar Sherif (99)
- ‡ (China) Zheng Qinwen (6) → replaced by (France) Léolia Jeanjean (100)
- ‡ (Montenegro) Danka Kovinić (95 PR) → replaced by (Spain) Nuria Párrizas Díaz (101)
- ‡ (Spain) Paula Badosa (10) → replaced by (Switzerland) Jil Teichmann (102)

† – not included on entry list
‡ – withdrew from entry list

Source: USTA

Preceded by 2025 Wimbledon Championships – Women's singles	Grand Slam women's singles	Succeeded by 2026 Australian Open – Women's singles
