= Arcadia Women's Pro Open =

ITF Women's Tour
- Event name: Arcadia Women's Pro Open
- Location: Arcadia, California, United States
- Venue: iTennis Arcadia
- Category: ITF Women's World Tennis Tour
- Surface: Hard / Outdoor
- Draw: 32S/32Q/16D
- Prize money: $25,000

The Arcadia Women's Pro Open is a tournament for professional female tennis players played on outdoor hard courts. The event is classified as a $25,000 ITF Women's World Tennis Tour tournament and has been held in Arcadia, California since 2022.

== Past finals ==
=== Singles ===
Year	Champion	Runner-up	Score
2026	(United States) Akasha Urhobo	(United States) Thea Frodin	6–2, 2–6, 6–2
2025	(Canada) Kayla Cross	(United States) Iva Jovic	6–2, 7–6^{(8–6)}
2024	(United States) Fiona Crawley	(United States) Ashley Lahey	4–6, 6–2, 7–5
2023	(Italy) Sara Errani	(Netherlands) Arantxa Rus	walkover
2022	(Canada) Rebecca Marino	(United States) Alycia Parks	7–6^{(7–0)}, 6–1

=== Doubles ===
Year	Champions	Runners-up	Score
2026	(United States) Eryn Cayetano (United States) Haley Giavara	(United States) Jaeda Daniel (Ukraine) Anita Sahdiieva	6–1, 6–1
2025	(United States) Victoria Osuigwe (United States) Alana Smith	(Indonesia) Aldila Sutjiadi (Indonesia) Janice Tjen	6–3, 6–4
2024	(United States) Angela Kulikov (United States) Ashley Lahey	(United States) Haley Giavara (United States) Brandy Walker	6–3, 6–2
2023	(United States) Francesca Di Lorenzo (United States) Christina Rosca	(Japan) Rina Saigo (Japan) Yukina Saigo	6–1, 6–1
2022	(United States) Ashlyn Krueger (United States) Robin Montgomery	(United Kingdom) Harriet Dart (Mexico) Giuliana Olmos	walkover
