= Madison Rose =

American singer-songwriter

- Born: Cincinnati, Ohio, United States
- Genres: Pop; Dance-pop; Electropop; Hyperpop
- Occupation: Singer-songwriter
- Years active: 2018–present
- Website: iammadisonrose.com

Madison Rose is an American singer-songwriter from Cincinnati, Ohio. She gained recognition with her 2018 debut single "Diamonds" and her 2019 collaboration with Kandy, "Keeping Secrets", which charted on Billboard's Dance/Mix Show Airplay chart. Known for her queer-focused artistry and vivid style, she released her debut album Technicolor in 2022. Rose has performed at RuPaul's DragCon and Boston Pride.

== Career ==
Madison Rose began her career with the single "Diamonds", which Billboard described as "only the beginning of 2018 for her". During the interview with Billboard, Rose called Dolly Parton and Beyonce musical inspirations and spoke of how important it was for her to create a safe space.

In 2019, Rose collaborated with DJ and producer Kandy on the single "Keeping Secrets," released through Thrive and Capitol Records. The track was released on June 22, 2019, and gained over 15 million streams across all platforms. The single also peaked at number 29 on July 6, 2019, and spent a total of four weeks on the Billboard Dance/Mix Show Airplay chart. Rose told Billboard she did not know much about Kandy before the collaboration and was not expecting much when she saw him on Diplo's Instagram story. The lyrics for the song were originally written by Rose, who wrote about a relationship that never materialized, while Kandy told Billboard that the song spoke to him about the experience of being closeted.

In 2020 Rose released another single, "Rainbow Phone," which generated excitement on TikTok. In a song review article, Earmilk described Madison Rose as having an "elegant style with modern day flare." Rose also told Earmilk how she was deeply inspired by rap culture.

Rose's fourth single, "SUNSHINE", was released in 2021. To celebrate it, she did her first drag performance at a local dive called the Offbeat Bar. Rolling Stone described the single as "the sonic embodiment of strutting down a drag-show runaway. It's loud, unabashed and bursting with optimism." Rose told Rolling Stone that a record label executive told her to expect a "complete shit show" if she tried to release "SUNSHINE".

Technicolor, Rose's debut album, came out in 2022 with two editions: a regular edition with eleven tracks and a deluxe edition with four more tracks. In an interview with Paper, Rose explained how the album was originally made for a label deal, but due to unknown circumstances the deal was pulled from her at the last minute. She also explained how the most difficult part for her as an independent artist was her limited budget, as she had to make her creativity and ideas work with only "a nickel and a prayer." Later that year, Rose performed on the main stage of RuPaul's DragCon LA after being brought out by Morgan McMichaels. She described DragCon as being "eye-opening" for her because it put her hard work into perspective.

On June 10, 2023, Rose was a headliner for Boston Pride. That same year, Spotify partnered with Rose and Lennon Stella to perform special covers of the song "True Colors" by Cyndi Lauper to celebrate Lauper's 70th birthday. Rose's cover had her touch of club remix. While working on this project, she had the opportunity to connect with one of the original writers of "True Colors", Billy Steinberg. She said meeting Steinberg was a big thing for her and that Lauper inspired her career and her music.

Later that year, Rose released the single "GIRLS GIRLS GIRLS." The track producer for "GIRLS GIRLS GIRLS", Arthur Besna, also produced the 2023 single "BoysBoysBoys" for Binoy. Rose told Paper that she thought "BoysBoysBoys" was a banger the first time she heard it, and she loved that Binoy was drawing from personal experience as a gay man. The producer "begged" to do a remix with the two of them, which Rose used to explore her pansexuality. The remix, entitled "BoysBoysBoys With Madison Rose", came out in 2024.

In 2024 Rose released her single "PANAVISION", which she described as how she sees the world as a "Black queer woman." The music video had brief glances of American flags that showed Rose's political view of America. "I don't subscribe to our government's vision of America," said Rose to Paper.

== Discography ==
All Credits adapted from Apple Music and Spotify.

=== Albums ===
- Monochrome: The White Album (2025 Upcoming)
- TECHNICOLOR: The Full Spectrum (2022)
- TECHNICOLOR (2022)

=== EP ===
- HAUS! (2024)

=== Singles ===
==== As lead artist ====
Year	Title	Album	Writer(s)	Producer(s)
2025	"DAYDREAMING"	Non-album singles	Madison rose	Madison Rose, Hubby, Jackson Hoffman, Grayson Harrison,
2025	"SINNERS"	Non-album singles	Madison Rose	No Producers credit
2025	"RED LIPSTICK"	Non-album singles	Madison Rose Dewberry, Dominic Florio	Madison Rose, Dominic Florio Hubby
2025	"SHE'S THE ONE"	Non-album singles	Madison Rose, Joseph Mysicka	Madison Rose, Brand0
2024	"PANAVISION"	Non-album singles	Madison Rose	Madison Rose, Dominic Florio
2024	"ULTRA HIGH DEF LOVER ( With Madison Rose)"	Non-album singles	Michael Myylo Lewis, Madison Rose Dewberry, Florio	Florio, Ryan Schumer
2024	"i don't believe in God (remixes)"	Non-album singles	Karin Ann, Benjamin Lazar Davis Will Graefe	Madison Rose, Benjamin lazar Davis, Will graefe, Dominic Florio, Luke Moellman
2024	"HAUS!"	Non-album singles	Madison Rose Dewberry, Arthur Besnainou	Madison Rose, Arthur Besnainou
2024	"FALLING OUTTA HEAVEN'	Non-album singles	Madison Rose, Dominic Florio, Madison Rose Dewberry	Madison Rose, Dominic Florio
2024	"PARADISE"	Non-album singles	Madison Rose Dewberry, Dominic Lee Florio	Madison Rose, Dominic Lee Florio
2024	"BoysBoysBoys (With Madison Rose)"	Non-album singles	Binoy Zachariah, Madison Rose Dewberry, Arthur Besnainou	Binoy, Madison Rose, Arthur Besnainou
2023	"GIFTS GIFTS GIFTS (GIRLS GIRLS GIRLS REMIX)"	Non-album singles	Madison Rose Dewberry, Liam Benayon, Arthur Besnainou	Madison Rose Dewberry, Liam Benayon, Arthur Besnainou
2023	"GHOULS GHOULS GHOULS (GIRLS GIRLS GIRLS REMIX)"	Non-album singles	Madison Rose, Liam Benayon, Arthur Besnainou	Madison Rose, Liam Benayon, Arthur Besnainou
2023	"GIRLS GIRLS GIRLS"	Non-album singles	Madison Rose Dewberry, Liam Benayon, Arthur Besnainou	Madison Rose, Liam Benayon, Arthur Besnainou
2023	"True colors (Spotify Singles)"	Non-album singles	Billy Steinberg & Tom Kelly	Arthur Besna & Madison Rose
2023	"IDOLIZE"	Non-album singles	Madison Rose Dewberry, Victor Verpillat and Yann Bargain	Victor Verpillat & Yann Bargain
2022	"Technicolor"	Non-album singles	Madison Rose Dewberry, Arthur Besnainou & Moises Zulaica	Madison Rose, Arthur Besnainou & Moises Zulaica
2022	"Better Off Alone"	Non-album singles	Kevin Schuppel & Madison Rose Dewberry	Kevin Schuppel & Kandy
2021	"ICONIC!"	Non-album singles	Horace Gold, Jake sheath,Kevin Schuppel, Madison Rose Dewberry & Nathaniel Sherwood	Madison Rose, Jake Sheath, Nathaniel Sherwood & Kandy
2021	"Lost My Mind (To The DJ)"	Non-album singles	Jake Sheath, Madison Rose Dewberry & Nathaniel Sherwood	Madison Rose, jake Sheath, Madison Rose Dewberry & Nathaniel Sherwood
2021	"SUNSHINE"	Non-album singles	Kevin Schuppel, Arthur besnainou & Madison Rose Dewberry	Madison Rose, kevin Schuppel, Arthur Besnainou, Madison Rose Dewberry & Kandy
2020	"Saving Grace"	Non-album singles	Aspyer	Aspyer
2020	"Rainbow Phone"	Non-album singles	Austin Woo, Madison Rose Dewberry, Nicholas Winholt, Shelby Benjamin & Win and Woo	Austin Woo, Nicholas Winholt & Win and Woo
2019	"Keeping Secrets"	Non-album single	Madison Rose, Kevin Schuppel & Lukas Costas	Kevin Schuppel & Lukas Costas
2018	"DIAMONDS"	Non-album single	no credits	Kale MacCharles & Cole Commandeur.
