= Rina Saigo =

Japanese tennis player (born 2000)

- Country (sports): Japan
- Born: 17 October 2000 (age 26) Chiba Prefecture, Japan
- Height: 1.60 m (5 ft 3 in)
- Plays: Right (two-handed backhand)
- Prize money: $154,354

Singles
- Career record: 254–206
- Career titles: 5 ITF
- Highest ranking: No. 270 (24 August 2026)
- Current ranking: No. 311 (16 November 2026)

Doubles
- Career record: 112–96
- Career titles: 6 ITF
- Highest ranking: No. 317 (26 February 2024)
- Last updated on: 22 November 2026.

Rina Saigo (西郷里奈, Saigō Rina; born 17 October 2000) is a Japanese tennis player. She has a career-high singles ranking of world No. 330 by the WTA, achieved on 9 September 2024. She also has a career-high doubles ranking of No. 317, set on 26 February 2024.

== Career ==
Saigo made her WTA Tour main-draw debut, after making it through qualifying at the 2022 Pan Pacific Open but she lost in the first round to Petra Martić.

She also qualified for the 2023 Pan Pacific Open, again losing there in the first round, this time to Cristina Bucșa.

== ITF Circuit finals ==
=== Singles: 8 (5 titles, 3 runner-ups) ===
Legend W50 tournaments W35 tournaments (3–2) W15 tournaments (2–1)	Finals by surface Hard (4–2) Clay (1–0) Carpet (0–1)

Result	W-L	Date	Tournament	Tier	Surface	Opponent	Score
Win	1–0	May 2022	ITF Antalya, Turkey	W15	Clay	Daria Lodikova	6–3, 6–0
Win	2–0	May 2024	ITF Tokyo, Japan	W15	Hard	(Japan) Shiho Akita	4–6, 7–6^{(6)}, 7–5
Win	3–0	Aug 2024	ITF Nakhon Si Thammarat, Thailand	W35	Hard	(India) Vaidehi Chaudhari	7–5, 2–6, 6–2
Win	4–0	Apr 2025	ITF Goyang, South Korea	W35	Hard	(Indonesia) Janice Tjen	2–6, 6–4, 6–1
Loss	4–1	Jun 2025	ITF Taipei, Taiwan	W35	Hard	(South Korea) Ku Yeon-woo	1–6, 4–6
Loss	4–2	Jun 2025	ITF Monastir, Tunisia	W15	Hard	(France) Manon Léonard	1–6, 2–6
Loss	4–3	May 2026	Fukuoka International, Japan	W35	Carpet	(United Kingdom) Katie Swan	1–6, 3–6
Win	5–3	Jul 2026	ITF Aldershot, United Kingdom	W35	Hard	(Hong Kong) Adithya Karunaratne	7–5, 2–6, 6–3

=== Doubles: 17 (6 titles, 11 runner-ups) ===
Legend W60 tournaments (0–1) W40 tournaments (0–1) W25 tournaments (1–1) W15 tournaments (5–8)	Finals by surface Hard (4–5) Clay (2–5) Carpet (0–1)

Result	W–L	Date	Tournament	Tier	Surface	Partner	Opponents	Score
Loss	0–1	Sep 2018	ITF Kyoto, Japan	W15	Hard	(Japan) Miyu Nakashima	(Japan) Chinatsu Shimizu (Japan) Minami Shumo	2–6, 4–6
Loss	0–2	Feb 2019	ITF Manacor, Spain	W15	Clay	(Japan) Yukina Saigo	(Spain) Claudia Hoste Ferrer (Spain) Rebeka Masarova	5–7, 3–6
Win	1–2	Mar 2019	ITF Antalya, Turkey	W15	Clay	(Japan) Yukina Saigo	(Chile) Barbara Gatica (Brazil) Rebeca Pereira	4–6, 6–2, [10–5]
Loss	1–3	Sep 2019	ITF Yeongwol, Korea	W15	Hard	(Japan) Yukina Saigo	(South Korea) Jeong Su-nam (South Korea) Kim Na-ri	4–6, 3–6
Win	2–3	Sep 2019	ITF Antalya, Turkey	W15	Hard	(Japan) Yukina Saigo	(Switzerland) Svenja Ochsner (Switzerland) Joanne Kuger	6–2, 6–3
Loss	2–4	Sep 2019	ITF Antalya, Turkey	W15	Hard	(Japan) Yukina Saigo	(Poland) Weronika Falkowska (Poland) Martyna Kubka	7–5, 4–6, [8–10]
Win	3–4	Oct 2019	ITF Antalya, Turkey	W15	Hard	(Japan) Yukina Saigo	(Russia) Anna Kubareva (Russia) Nika Shytkouskaya	6–2, 6–3
Loss	3–5	Mar 2021	ITF Monastir, Tunisia	W15	Hard	(Japan) Yukina Saigo	(Netherlands) Isabelle Haverlag (Russia) Anastasia Pribylova	3–6, 1–6
Win	4–5	Dec 2021	ITF Monastir, Tunisia	W15	Hard	(Japan) Yukina Saigo	(France) Yasmine Mansouri (Italy) Alessandra Simone	6–0, 4–6, [10–5]
Loss	4–6	Apr 2022	ITF Antalya, Turkiye	W15	Clay	(Japan) Yukina Saigo	(Japan) Misaki Matsuda (Japan) Riko Sawayanagi	6–7, 2–6
Loss	4–7	May 2022	ITF Antalya, Turkiye	W15	Clay	(Japan) Yukina Saigo	Ksenia Laskutova (Japan) Misaki Matsuda	5–7, 4–6
Loss	4–8	May 2022	ITF Antalya, Turkiye	W15	Clay	(Japan) Yukina Saigo	(Bulgaria) Dia Evtimova (Portugal) Inês Murta	0–6, 2–6
Win	5–8	Aug 2022	ITF Danderyd, Sweden	W25	Clay	(Japan) Yukina Saigo	(United States) Ashley Lahey (Sweden) Lisa Zaar	2–6, 7–5, [10–7]
Loss	5–9	Mar 2023	Arcadia Open, United States	W60	Hard	(Japan) Yukina Saigo	(United States) Francesca Di Lorenzo (United States) Christina Rosca	1–6, 1–6
Loss	5–10	Sep 2023	ITF Skopje, North Macedonia	W40	Clay	(Japan) Yukina Saigo	(Kazakhstan) Zhibek Kulambayeva (Lithuania) Justina Mikulskytė	3–6, 4–6
Loss	5–11	Oct 2023	ITF Makinohara, Japan	W25	Carpet	(Japan) Yukina Saigo	(Japan) Hiromi Abe (Japan) Anri Nagata	6–1, 5–7, [8–10]
Win	6–11	Feb 2024	ITF Monastir, Tunisia	W15	Hard	(Japan) Yukina Saigo	(Germany) Selina Dal (Netherlands) Stéphanie Visscher	6–3, 7–5
