= Alyssa Ahn =

American tennis player

- Country (sports): United States
- Born: December 27, 2006 (age 19)
- College: Stanford
- Prize money: $132,307

Singles
- Highest ranking: No. 652 (8 September 2025)
- Current ranking: No. 900 (29 June 2026)

Grand Slam singles results
- US Open: 1R (2025)

Doubles
- Highest ranking: No. 875 (14 January 2024)
- Current ranking: No. 1343 (11 August 2025)
- Last updated on: 12 July 2026.

Alyssa Ahn is an American tennis player. She has a career high WTA tennis ranking of No. 652 achieved on September 8, 2025.

== Career ==
From San Diego, California, she committed in 2025 to attend Stanford University to play for the Stanford Cardinal.

Ahn won the USTA Girls’ 16s National Championships in 2022. She earned a wildcard into the main draw of the US Open after victory in the USTA Girls’ 18s National Championships in California in August 2025 when she defeated Maya Iyengar in straight sets for the loss of only three games. Ahn lost to 19th seed Elise Mertens in the first round.
