= 2020 Zed Tennis Open II =

- Date: 10–16 February 2020
- Edition: 2nd
- Category: ITF Women's World Tennis Tour
- Prize money: $60,000
- Surface: Hard
- Location: Cairo, Egypt

Champions

Singles
- (Ukraine) Marta Kostyuk

Doubles
- (Ukraine) Marta Kostyuk / (Russia) Kamilla Rakhimova
← 2020 ·	Zed Tennis Open	· 2020 →

The 2020 Zed Tennis Open II was a professional tennis tournament played on outdoor hard courts. It was the second edition of the tournament which was part of the 2020 ITF Women's World Tennis Tour. It took place in Cairo, Egypt between 17 and 23 February 2020.

== Singles main-draw entrants ==
=== Seeds ===
Country	Player	Rank^{1}	Seed
RUS	Vitalia Diatchenko	89	1
RUS	Varvara Gracheva	102	2
ESP	Aliona Bolsova	137	3
ROU	Irina-Camelia Begu	118	4
NED	Lesley Pattinama Kerkhove	157	5
ROU	Irina Bara	160	6
BUL	Isabella Shinikova	166	7
ROU	Elena-Gabriela Ruse	167	8

- ^{1} Rankings are as of 10 February 2020.

=== Other entrants ===
The following players received wildcards into the singles main draw:

- (Egypt) Lamis Alhussein Abdel Aziz
- (Austria) Melanie Klaffner
- (Spain) Ane Mintegi del Olmo
- (Egypt) Sandra Samir

The following player received entry using a junior exempt:

- (Ukraine) Daria Snigur

The following players received entry from the qualifying draw:

- (Romania) Georgia Crăciun
- (Russia) Anastasia Gasanova
- (Croatia) Tereza Mrdeža
- (Poland) Katarzyna Piter
- (Italy) Stefania Rubini
- (Uzbekistan) Sabina Sharipova
- (Ukraine) Anastasiya Shoshyna
- (China) Yang Yidi

The following player received entry as a Lucky Loser:

- (United Kingdom) Amanda Carreras

== Champions ==
=== Singles ===
- (Ukraine) Marta Kostyuk def. (Spain) Aliona Bolsova, 6–1, 6–0

=== Doubles ===
- (Ukraine) Marta Kostyuk / (Russia) Kamilla Rakhimova def. (Poland) Paula Kania / (Ukraine) Anastasiya Shoshyna, 6–3, 2–6, [10–6]
