= Marta Kostyuk career statistics =

Career finals
Discipline	Type	Won	Lost	Total
Singles	Grand Slam	–	–	–
Singles	WTA Finals	–	–	–
Singles	WTA 1000	1	–	1
Singles	WTA 500	0	3	3
Singles	WTA 250	2	–	2
Singles	Olympics	–	–	–
Singles	Total	3	3	6
Doubles	Grand Slam	–	–	–
Doubles	WTA Finals	–	–	–
Doubles	WTA 1000	–	–	–
Doubles	WTA 500	–	–	–
Doubles	WTA 250	2	1	3
Doubles	Olympics	–	–	–
Doubles	Total	2	1	3

This is a list of the main career statistics of professional Ukrainian tennis player Marta Kostyuk. She has won three WTA Tour singles titles, the most significant a WTA 1000-level title at the 2026 Madrid Open. Kostyuk also earned two trophies in doubles. At the 2024 Australian Open, she advanced to her first major singles quarterfinal, while getting previously at the semifinal stage in doubles at the 2023 Australian Open.

== Performance timelines ==
Key
W	F	SF	QF	#R	RR	Q#	P#	DNQ	A	Z#	PO	G	S	B	NMS	NTI	P	NH

(W) winner; (F) finalist; (SF) semifinalist; (QF) quarterfinalist; (#R) rounds 4, 3, 2, 1; (RR) round-robin stage; (Q#) qualification round; (P#) preliminary round; (DNQ) did not qualify; (A) absent; (Z#) Davis/Fed Cup Zonal Group (with number indication) or (PO) play-off; (G) gold, (S) silver or (B) bronze Olympic/Paralympic medal; (NMS) not a Masters tournament; (NTI) not a Tier I tournament; (P) postponed; (NH) not held; (SR) strike rate (events won / competed); (W–L) win–loss record.
To avoid confusion and double counting, these charts are updated at the conclusion of a tournament or when the player's participation has ended.

Only main-draw results in WTA Tour, Grand Slam tournaments, Billie Jean King Cup, United Cup, Hopman Cup and Olympic Games are included in win–loss records.

=== Singles ===
Current through the 2026 US Open.

Tournament	2018	2019	2020	2021	2022	2023	2024	2025	2026	SR	W–L	Win%
Grand Slam tournaments
Australian Open	3R	Q3	Q1	1R	3R	3R	QF	3R	1R	0 / 7	12–7	63%
French Open	Q2	A	1R	4R	1R	1R	2R	1R	SF	0 / 7	9–7	56%
Wimbledon	Q3	Q1	NH	2R	2R	3R	3R	1R	SF	0 / 6	11–6	65%
US Open	Q2	A	3R	1R	2R	1R	3R	4R	4R	0 / 7	11–7	61%
Win–Loss	2–1	0–0	2–2	4–4	4–4	4–4	9–4	5–4	13–4	0 / 27	43–27	61%
National representation
Billie Jean King Cup	WG2	Z1	PO (Note: Edition split into the two years due to COVID-19.)		QR	QR	A	SF	QR	0 / 1	12–3	80%
Summer Olympics	NH			A	NH		QF	NH		0 / 1	3–1	75%
WTA 1000 tournaments
Qatar Open	A	NTI	A	NTI	1R	NTI	2R	QF	A	0 / 3	4–3	57%
Dubai Championships	NTI	A	NTI	A	NTI	2R	A	2R	A	0 / 2	2–2	50%
Indian Wells Open	A	A	NH	2R	2R	1R	SF	4R	3R	0 / 6	8–6	57%
Miami Open	A	A	NH	1R	2R	2R	A	4R	3R	0 / 5	5–5	50%
Madrid Open	1R	1R	NH	Q2	2R	2R	2R	QF	W	1 / 7	10–6	63%
Italian Open	A	A	A	1R	1R	3R	2R	4R	A	0 / 5	4–5	44%
Canadian Open	A	A	NH	A	A	1R	3R	QF	4R	0 / 4	7–4	64%
Cincinnati Open	A	A	A	A	2R	1R	3R	3R (Note: Withdrawal during the tournament, not counted as a loss.)	QF	0 / 5	7–4	64%
China Open	A	A	NH			3R	2R	4R	A	0 / 3	4–3	57%
Wuhan Open	A	A	NH				3R	1R	2R	0 / 3	1–3	25%
Guadalajara Open	NH				2R	2R	NTI			0 / 2	2–2	50%
Win–Loss	0–1	0–1	0–0	1–3	5–7	6–9	9–8	20–9	13–5	1 / 45	54–43	56%
Career statistics
	2018	2019	2020	2021	2022	2023	2024	2025	2026	SR	W–L	Win%
Tournaments	5	3	5	16	20	21	15	20	13	Career total: 118		
Titles	0	0	0	0	0	1	0	0	2	Career total: 3		
Finals	0	0	0	0	0	1	2	0	3	Career total: 6		
Hard win–loss	2–2	2–1	2–3	11–10	14–13	20–15	23–11	20–13	14–5	1 / 82	108–76	59%
Clay win–loss	1–2	2–2	0–2	7–3	1–4	2–4	8–5	7–4	17–1	2 / 27	45–27	63%
Grass win–loss	1–2	0–0	0–0	2–3	3–2	2–2	2–3	0–3	5–1	0 / 13	15–16	48%
Overall win–loss	4–6	4–3	2–5	20–16	18–19	24–21	33–19	27–20	35–9	3 / 115	167–118	59%
Win %	40%	57%	29%	56%	49%	53%	63%	57%	78%	Career total: 58%		
Year-end ranking (Note: 2017: WTA ranking-518.)	118	155	98	50	70	39	18	26	10	$8,251,260		

=== Doubles ===
Current through 2026 WTA Tour.

Tournament	2018	2019	2020	2021	2022	2023	2024	2025	2026	SR	W–L	Win%
Grand Slam tournaments
Australian Open	A	A	A	1R	3R	SF	2R	QF	A	0 / 5	10–5	67%
French Open	A	A	QF	1R	QF	3R	SF	A	A	0 / 5	12–5	71%
Wimbledon	A	A	NH	2R	2R	2R	3R	2R	3R	0 / 6	8–4	67%
US Open	A	A	A	3R	3R	3R	2R	3R	2R	0 / 6	10–5	67%
Win–Loss	0–0	0–0	3–1	3–3	8–4	9–4	8–3	6–3	3–1	0 / 22	40–19	68%
National representation
Billie Jean King Cup	WG2	Z1	PO		QR	QR		F		0 / 0	3–3	50%
Summer Olympics	NH			A	NH		2R	NH		0 / 1	1–0	100%
WTA 1000 tournaments
Qatar Open	A	NTI	A	NTI	2R	NTI	A	1R	A	0 / 2	1–2	33%
Dubai Championships	NTI	A	NTI	A	NTI	A	A	A	A	0 / 0	0–0	–
Indian Wells Open	A	A	NH	A	A	1R	A	A	A	0 / 1	0–1	0%
Miami Open	A	A	NH	A	A	A	A	A	A	0 / 0	0–0	–
Madrid Open	A	A	NH	A	A	SF	A	A	1R	0 / 2	2–2	50%
Italian Open	A	A	A	A	2R	2R	A	2R	A	0 / 3	3–2	60%
Canadian Open	A	A	NH	A	A	2R	A	A	A	0 / 1	1–1	50%
Cincinnati Open	A	A	A	A	A	1R	A	A	2R	0 / 2	1–2	33%
China Open	A	A	NH			A	2R	A		0 / 1	1–1	50%
Wuhan Open	A	A	NH				A	1R		0 / 1	0–1	0%
Guadalajara Open	NH				1R	A	NTI			0 / 1	0–1	0%
Win–Loss	0–0	0–0	0–0	0–0	2–3	4–5	1–1	1–2	1–2	0 / 14	9–13	41%
Career statistics
	2018	2019	2020	2021	2022	2023	2024	2025	2026	SR	W–L	Win%
Tournaments	0	0 (Note: During the season, she did not play in the main draw of any tour-level tournaments. However, she played at the Billie Jean King Cup, which is not counted as a played tournament but matches counted.)	2	11	4	10				Career total: 27		
Titles	0	0	0	0	1	1				Career total: 2		
Finals	0	0	0	1	1	1				Career total: 3		
Hard win–loss	0–0	1–2	4–1	9–7	9–6	4–5				1 / 14	27–21	56%
Clay win–loss	0–0	0–0	3–1	0–1	5–2	5–3				0 / 8	13–7	65%
Grass win–loss	0–0	0–0	0–0	1–1	1–1	5–1				1 / 5	7–3	70%
Overall win–loss	0–0	1–2	7–2	10–9	15–9	14–9				2 / 27	47–31	60%
Year-end ranking	849	568	112	97	46	28	60	88				

=== Mixed doubles ===
Tournament	2021	2022	2023	W–L
Australian Open	A	A	A	0–0
French Open	A	A	QF	2–1
Wimbledon	2R	A	QF	3–1
US Open	A	A	A	0–0
Win–Loss	1–0	0–0	4–2	5–2

== WTA 1000 tournament finals ==
=== Singles: 1 (title) ===
Result	Year	Tournament	Surface	Opponent	Score
Win	2026	Madrid Open	Clay	Mirra Andreeva	6–3, 7–5

== WTA Tour finals ==
=== Singles: 6 (3 titles, 3 runner-ups) ===
Legend WTA 1000 (1–0) WTA 500 (0–3) WTA 250 (2–0)	Finals by surface Hard (1–2) Clay (2–1)	Finals by setting Outdoor (2–2) Indoor (1–1)

Result	W–L	Date	Tournament	Tier	Surface	Opponent	Score
Win	1–0	Mar 2023	ATX Open, US	WTA 250	Hard	(France) Varvara Gracheva	6–3, 7–5
Loss	1–1	Mar 2024	San Diego Open, US	WTA 500	Hard	(United Kingdom) Katie Boulter	7–5, 2–6, 2–6
Loss	1–2	Apr 2024	Stuttgart Grand Prix, Germany	WTA 500	Clay (i)	(Kazakhstan) Elena Rybakina	2–6, 2–6
Loss	1–3	Jan 2026	Brisbane International, Australia	WTA 500	Hard	Aryna Sabalenka	4–6, 3–6
Win	2–3	Apr 2026	Open de Rouen, France	WTA 250	Clay (i)	(Ukraine) Veronika Podrez	6–3, 6–4
Win	3–3	Apr 2026	Madrid Open, Spain	WTA 1000	Clay	Mirra Andreeva	6–3, 7–5

=== Doubles: 3 (2 titles, 1 runner-up) ===
Legend WTA 250 (2–1)	Finals by surface Hard (1–1) Grass (1–0)	Finals by setting Outdoor (2–1)

Result	W–L	Date	Tournament	Tier	Surface	Partner	Opponents	Score
Loss	0–1	Oct 2021	Tenerife Ladies Open, Spain	WTA 250	Hard	(Ukraine) Lyudmyla Kichenok	(Norway) Ulrikke Eikeri (Australia) Ellen Perez	3–6, 3–6
Win	1–1	Sep 2022	Portorož Open, Slovenia	WTA 250	Hard	(Czech Republic) Tereza Martincová	(Spain) Cristina Bucșa (Slovakia) Tereza Mihalíková	6–4, 6–0
Win	2–1	Jun 2023	Birmingham Classic, UK	WTA 250	Grass	(Czech Republic) Barbora Krejčíková	(Australia) Storm Hunter (United States) Alycia Parks	6–2, 7–6^{(9–7)}

== WTA 125 finals ==
=== Doubles: 1 (title) ===
Result	Date	Tournament	Surface	Partner	Opponents	Score
Win	Dec 2022	Open de Limoges, France	Hard (i)	(Georgia (country)) Oksana Kalashnikova	(United Kingdom) Alicia Barnett (United Kingdom) Olivia Nicholls	7–5, 6–1

== ITF Circuit finals ==
=== Singles: 8 (3 titles, 5 runner-ups) ===
Legend W80 tournaments (0–2) W60 tournaments (2–3) W25 tournaments (1–0)	Finals by surface Hard (2–3) Clay (1–2)

Result	W–L	Date	Tournament	Tier	Surface	Opponent	Score
Win	1–0	May 2017	ITF Dunakeszi, Hungary	W25	Clay	(United States) Bernarda Pera	6–4, 6–3
Win	2–0	Feb 2018	Burnie International, Australia	W60	Hard	(Switzerland) Viktorija Golubic	6–4, 6–3
Loss	2–1	Mar 2018	Zhuhai Open, China	W60	Hard	(Belgium) Maryna Zanevska	2–6, 4–6
Loss	2–2	Jun 2019	Bella Cup Torun, Poland	W60+H	Clay	(Slovakia) Rebecca Šramková	1–6, 2–6
Loss	2–3	Sep 2019	Open de Saint-Malo, France	W60+H	Clay	(Russia) Varvara Gracheva	3–6, 2–6
Win	3–3	Feb 2020	Cairo Open, Egypt	W60	Hard	(Spain) Aliona Bolsova	6–1, 6–0
Loss	3–4	Oct 2020	Classic of Macon, United States	W80	Hard	(United States) CiCi Bellis	4–6, 7–6^{(4)}, ret.
Loss	3–5	Oct 2020	Tyler Pro Classic, United States	W80	Hard	(United States) Ann Li	5–7, 6–1, 3–6

=== Doubles: 2 (2 titles) ===
Legend W60 tournaments (1–0) W25 tournaments (1–0)	Finals by surface Hard (1–0) Clay (1–0)

Result	W–L	Date	Tournament	Tier	Surface	Partner	Opponents	Score
Win	1–0	Apr 2019	Chiasso Open, Switzerland	W25	Clay	(Spain) Cristina Bucșa	(Canada) Sharon Fichman (Australia) Jaimee Fourlis	6–1, 3–6, [10–7]
Win	2–0	Feb 2020	Cairo Open, Egypt	W60	Hard	(Russia) Kamilla Rakhimova	(Ukraine) Anastasiya Shoshyna (Poland) Paula Kania	6–3, 2–6, [10–6]

== Junior finals ==
=== Grand Slam tournaments ===
==== Singles: 1 (title) ====
Result	Year	Tournament	Surface	Opponent	Score
Win	2017	Australian Open	Hard	(Switzerland) Rebeka Masarova	7–5, 1–6, 6–4

==== Doubles: 1 (title) ====
Result	Year	Tournament	Surface	Partner	Opponents	Score
Win	2017	US Open	Hard	(Serbia) Olga Danilović	(Croatia) Lea Bošković (China) Wang Xiyu	6–1, 7–5

=== ITF Junior Circuit ===
==== Singles: 8 (4 titles, 4 runner-ups) ====
Legend
Category GA
Junior Masters (1–0)
Category G1 (1–1)
Category G2 (2–2)
Category G3–G5 (0–1)

Result	W–L	Date	Tournament	Tier	Surface	Opponent	Score
Loss	0–1	Jul 2015	ITF Lviv, Ukraine	G4	Clay	(Ukraine) Oleksandra Andieieva	w/o
Loss	0–2	Jul 2015	ITF Siauliai, Lithuania	G2	Hard	(United Kingdom) Jodie Burrage	3–6, 3–6
Win	1–2	May 2016	ITF Budapest, Hungary	G2	Clay	(Slovenia) Kaja Juvan	0–6, 6–4, 6–4
Win	2–2	Sep 2016	ITF Budapest, Hungary	G2	Clay	(Latvia) Daniela Vismane	6–0, 6–1
Loss	2–3	Sep 2016	ITF Novi Sad, Serbia	G2	Clay	(China) Wang Xinyu	5–7, 2–6
Loss	2–4	Jan 2017	ITF Traralgon, Australia	G1	Hard	(Poland) Iga Świątek	3–6, 3–6
Win	3–4	Sep 2017	ITF Repentigny, Canada	G1	Hard	(Canada) Layne Sleeth	6–2, 6–2
Win	4–4	Oct 2017	Junior Masters, China	JM	Hard	(Slovenia) Kaja Juvan	6–4, 6–3

==== Doubles: 5 (4 titles, 1 runner-up) ====
Legend
Category GA
Category G1 (1–1)
Category G2 (3–0)
Category G3–G5

Result	W–L	Date	Tournament	Tier	Surface	Partner	Opponents	Score
Win	1–0	Jun 2016	ITF Bytom, Poland	G2	Clay	(Russia) Natalia Boltinskaya	(Czech Republic) Karolína Beránková (Slovenia) Nika Radišič	6–2, 6–4
Loss	1–1	Jun 2016	ITF Berlin, Germany	G1	Clay	(Latvia) Deniza Marcinkēviča	(Chinese Taipei) Liang En-shuo (Japan) Anri Nagata	6–2, 5–7, [8–10]
Win	2–1	Sep 2016	ITF Budapest, Hungary	G2	Clay	(Russia) Sofya Lansere	(Russia) Valeriya Deminova (Russia) Taisya Pachkaleva	7–6^{(4)}, 4–6, [10–7]
Win	3–1	Sep 2016	ITF Novi Sad, Serbia	G2	Clay	(Latvia) Deniza Marcinkēviča	(Russia) Sofya Lansere (Russia) Kamilla Rakhimova	6–4, 4–6, [10–1]
Win	4–1	Jul 2017	ITF Roehampton, UK	G1	Grass	(Canada) Carson Branstine	(United States) Taylor Johnson (United States) Claire Liu	6–2, 7–5

== WTA Tour career earnings ==
Current as of 23 May 2022

Year	Titles			Earnings ($)	Rank
Year	Grand Slam	WTA	Total	Earnings ($)	Rank
2016	–	–	–	393	1970
2017	–	–	–	6,112	768
2018	–	–	–	200,737	132
2019	–	–	–	90,685	236
2020	–	–	–	321,578	75
2021	–	–	–	643,865	52
2022	–	–	–	797,983	49
2023	–	1	1	1,104,469	34
2024	–	–	–	1,794,937	22
2025	–	–	–	1,794,913	26
Career	0	1	1	6,857,222	118

== Grand Slam tournament statistics ==
=== Best Grand Slam tournament results details ===
Australian Open
2024 (not seeded)
Round	Opponent	Rank	Score
1R	(United States) Claire Liu	99	6–3, 4–6, 6–1
2R	(Belgium) Elise Mertens (25)	28	5–7, 6–1, 7–6^{(8-6)}
3R	(Armenia) Elina Avanesyan	74	2–6, 6–4, 6–4
4R	Maria Timofeeva (Q)	170	6–2, 6–1
QF	(United States) Coco Gauff (4)	4	6–7^{(6–8)}, 7–6^{(7–3)}, 2–6

Wimbledon Championships
2026 (12th)
Round	Opponent	Rank	Score
1R	(Argentina) Nadia Podoroska	574	6–1, 6–2
2R	Anna Blinkova	114	6–7^{(5–7)}, 6–3, 6–3
3R	(United States) Emma Navarro (23)	26	6–2, 4–6, 6–1
5R	(United States) Ashlyn Krueger	102	6–4, 6–4
QF	(Italy) Jasmine Paolini(13)	17	6–3, 6–2
SF	(Czech Republic) Linda Nosková (9)	12	4–6, 4–6

French Open
2026 (15th)
Round	Opponent	Rank	Score
1R	Oksana Selekhmeteva	88	6–2, 6–3
2R	(United States) Katie Volynets	108	6–7^{(4–7)}, 6–3, 6–3
3R	(Switzerland) Viktorija Golubic	82	6–4, 6–3
4R	(Poland) Iga Świątek (3)	3	7–5, 6–1
QF	(Ukraine) Elina Svitolina (7)	7	6–3, 2–6, 6–2
SF	Mirra Andreeva (8)	8	1–6, 3–6

US Open
2025 US Open (27th)
Round	Opponent	Rank	Score
1R	(United Kingdom) Katie Boulter	48	6–4, 6–4
2R	(Turkey) Zeynep Sönmez	81	7–5, 6–7^{(5–7)}, 6–3
3R	(France) Diane Parry	107	3–6, 6–4, 6–2
4R	(Czech Republic) Karolína Muchová (11)	13	3–6, 7–6^{(7–0)}, 3–6

=== Grand Slam tournament seedings ===
The tournaments won by Kostyuk are in boldface, and advanced into finals by Kostyuk are in italics.

Year	Australian Open	French Open	Wimbledon	US Open
2018	Q	DNQ	DNQ	DNQ
2019	DNQ	A	DNQ	A
2020	DNQ	Q	cancelled	–
2021	–	–	–	–
2022	–	–	–	–
2023	–	–	–	–
2024	–	18th	18th	19th
2025	17th	26th	26th	27th
2026	20th	15th	12th	

- Key: (A) absent; (Q) qualifier; (DNQ) did not qualify; (RT) retired; (NH) Not Held; (–) unseeded; (LL) lucky looser; (PR) protect ranking.

== Wins against top 10 players ==
- Kostyuk has a 17–31 (35%) record against players who were, at the time the match was played, ranked in the top 10.

No.	Player	Rk	Event	Surface	Rd	Score	Rk	Years	Ref
1	(Greece) Maria Sakkari	8	Wimbledon, United Kingdom	Grass	1R	0–6, 7–5, 6–2	36	2023	
2	(France) Caroline Garcia	6	Washington Open, United States	Hard	2R	6–2, 6–3	34	2023	
3	(Tunisia) Ons Jabeur	7	China Open, China	Hard	2R	7–6^{(7–5)}, 6–1	44	2023	
4	(United States) Jessica Pegula	5	San Diego Open, United States	Hard	SF	7–6^{(7–4)}, 6–1	34	2024	
5	(China) Zheng Qinwen	7	Stuttgart Open, Germany	Clay (i)	2R	6–2, 4–6, 7–5	27	2024	
6	(United States) Coco Gauff	3	Stuttgart Open, Germany	Clay (i)	QF	3–6, 6–4, 7–6^{(8–6)}	27	2024	
7	(Czech Republic) Markéta Vondroušová	8	Stuttgart Open, Germany	Clay (i)	SF	7–6^{(7–2)}, 6–2	27	2024	
8	(Greece) Maria Sakkari	8	Paris Olympics, France	Clay	3R	4–6, 7–6^{(7–5)}, 6–4	19	2024	
9	(United States) Coco Gauff	3	Qatar Ladies Open, Qatar	Hard	2R	6–2, 7–5	21	2025	
10	(United States) Amanda Anisimova	3	Brisbane International, Australia	Hard	3R	6–4, 6–3	26	2026	
11	Mirra Andreeva	9	Brisbane International, Australia	Hard	QF	7–6^{(9–7)}, 6–3	26	2026	
12	(United States) Jessica Pegula	6	Brisbane International, Australia	Hard	SF	6–0, 6–3	26	2026	
13	(United States) Jessica Pegula	5	Madrid Open, Spain	Clay	3R	6–1, 6–4	23	2026	
14	Mirra Andreeva	8	Madrid Open, Spain	Clay	F	6–3, 7–5	23	2026	
15	(Poland) Iga Świątek	3	French Open, France	Clay	4R	7–5, 6–1	15	2026	
16	(Ukraine) Elina Svitolina	7	French Open, France	Clay	QF	6–3, 2–6, 6–2	15	2026	
17	Mirra Andreeva	6	Cincinnati Open, United States	Hard	4R	4–6, 6–0, 6–2	11	2026	

- Key: (Rk) first use, opponent rank; (Rd) round; (Rk) 2nd use, player rank; (Ref) reference; (F) final; (SF) semifinal; (QF) quarterfinal; (#R) rounds 4, 3, 2, 1; (RR) round-robin stage; (Q#) qualifying rounds or stages (3), 2, 1.

== Double-bagel matches ==
Result	W–L	Year	Tournament	Tier	Surface	Opponent	Rank	Rd	Rank
Win	1–0	2017	ITF La Marsa, Tunisia	25,000	Clay	(Tunisia) Mey Ayari	–	Q1	–
Win	2–0	2020	Prague Open, Czech Republic	International	Clay	(Australia) Storm Sanders	No. 275	Q3	No.141
Win	3–0	2020	Tyler Pro Classic, United States	80,000	Hard	(Mexico) Fernanda Contreras	No. 468	1R	No. 104

== Longest winning streaks ==
=== 17 match win streak (2026) ===
The 17 consecutive matches won by Kostyuk in the spring was the longest win-streak of any player in 2026.

#	Tournament	Category	Start date	Surface	Rd	Opponent	Rank	Score	MKR
–	Miami Open	WTA1000	22 March	Hard	3R	(Kazakhstan) Elena Rybakina (3)	No. 2	6–3, 6–4	28
1	BJK Cup	BJK Cup	10 April	Clay (i)	RR	(Poland) Magda Linette	No. 50	6–4, 6–0	27
2	Open de Rouen	WTA250	14 April	Clay (i)	1R	(France) Diane Parry	No. 102	6–1, 6–4	28
3	Open de Rouen	WTA250	14 April	Clay (i)	2R	(United States) Caty McNally	No. 77	2–6, 6–2, 6–1	28
4	Open de Rouen	WTA250	14 April	Clay (i)	QF	(United States) Ann Li (5)	No. 39	6–0, 6–7^{(4–7)}, 6–3	28
5	Open de Rouen	WTA250	14 April	Clay (i)	SF	(Germany) Tatjana Maria	No. 59	6–3, 6–0	28
6	Open de Rouen	WTA250	14 April	Clay (i)	F	(Ukraine) Veronika Podrez (Q)	No. 205	6–3, 6–4	28
7	Madrid Open	WTA1000	24 April	Clay	2R	(Kazakhstan) Yulia Putintseva	No. 80	6–1, 6–3	23
8	Madrid Open	WTA1000	24 April	Clay	3R	(United States) Jessica Pegula (5)	No. 5	6–1, 6–4	23
9	Madrid Open	WTA1000	24 April	Clay	4R	(United States) Caty McNally	No. 76	6–1, 6–2	23
10	Madrid Open	WTA1000	24 April	Clay	QF	(Czech Republic) Linda Nosková (13)	No. 13	7–6^{(7–1)}, 6–0	23
11	Madrid Open	WTA1000	24 April	Clay	SF	(Austria) Anastasia Potapova (LL)	No. 59	6–2, 1–6, 6–1	23
12	Madrid Open	WTA1000	24 April	Clay	F	Mirra Andreeva (9)	No. 8	6–3, 7–5	23
13	French Open	Grand Slam	24 May	Clay	1R	(Spain) Oksana Selekhmeteva	No. 88	6–2, 6–3	15
14	French Open	Grand Slam	24 May	Clay	2R	(United States) Katie Volynets	No. 108	6–7^{(4–7)}, 6–3, 6–3	15
15	French Open	Grand Slam	24 May	Clay	3R	(Switzerland) Viktorija Golubic	No. 82	6–4, 6–3	15
16	French Open	Grand Slam	24 May	Clay	4R	(Poland) Iga Świątek (3)	No. 3	7–5, 6–1	15
17	French Open	Grand Slam	24 May	Clay	QF	(Ukraine) Elina Svitolina (7)	No. 7	6–3, 2–6, 6–2	15
–	French Open	Grand Slam	24 May	Clay	SF	Mirra Andreeva (8)	No. 8	1–6, 3–6	15
