= 2020 Zed Tennis Open – Doubles =

Doubles
- 2020 Zed Tennis Open

Final
- Champions: (Serbia) Aleksandra Krunić (Poland) Katarzyna Piter
- Runners-up: (Netherlands) Arantxa Rus (Egypt) Mayar Sherif
- Score: 6–4, 6–2

Events
Singles	Doubles
Zed Tennis Open	· 2020 →

This was the first edition of the tournament.

Aleksandra Krunić and Katarzyna Piter won the title, defeating Arantxa Rus and Mayar Sherif in the final, 6–4, 6–2

== Seeds ==
1. (Spain) Lara Arruabarrena / (Romania) Irina-Camelia Begu (first round)
2. (Romania) Irina Bara / (Netherlands) Lesley Pattinama Kerkhove (quarterfinals)
3. (Serbia) Aleksandra Krunić / (Poland) Katarzyna Piter (champions)
4. (Spain) Aliona Bolsova / (Croatia) Tereza Mrdeža (first round)

== Draw ==
=== Key ===
- Q = Qualifier
- WC = Wild card
- LL = Lucky loser
- Alt = Alternate
- SE = Special exempt
- PR = Protected ranking
- ITF = ITF entry
- JE = Junior exempt
- w/o = Walkover
- r = Retired
- d = Defaulted
- SR = Special ranking

=== Draw ===
First round
1	(Spain) L Arruabarrena (Romania) I-C Begu	1	6	[5]
(Ukraine) M Kostyuk (Ukraine) L Tsurenko	6	4	[10]
(France) T Andrianjafitrimo (Romania) G Crăciun	6	1	[10]
WC	(Belgium) M Kempen (Egypt) S Samir	4	6	[12]
3	(Serbia) A Krunić (Poland) K Piter	6	6
WC	(Spain) A Lantigua de la Nuez (Spain) A Mintegi del Olmo	2	2
(Turkey) Ç Büyükakçay (Georgia (country)) E Gorgodze	7^{7}	0
(Russia) A Gasanova (Russia) A Morgina	6^{4}	0^{r}
(Netherlands) A Rus (Egypt) M Sherif	6	4	[10]
(Italy) C Ferrando (Italy) S Rubini	2	6	[6]
(Serbia) D Radanović (Germany) A Zaja	1	7^{7}	[10]
4	(Spain) A Bolsova (Croatia) T Mrdeža	6	6^{4}	[5]
(Italy) E Cocciaretto (Italy) M Trevisan	6	6^{7}	[7]
(Poland) P Kania (Ukraine) A Shoshyna	3	7^{9}	[10]
WC	(Egypt) L Alhussein Abdel Aziz (Belarus) S Talbi	3	2
2	(Romania) I Bara (Netherlands) L Pattinama Kerkhove	6	6

Quarterfinals
(Ukraine) M Kostyuk (Ukraine) L Tsurenko	w/o
WC	(Belgium) M Kempen (Egypt) S Samir
3	(Serbia) A Krunić (Poland) K Piter	6	6
(Turkey) Ç Büyükakçay (Georgia (country)) E Gorgodze	3	1
(Netherlands) A Rus (Egypt) M Sherif	7^{10}	6
(Serbia) D Radanović (Germany) A Zaja	6^{8}	3
(Poland) P Kania (Ukraine) A Shoshyna	0	6	[10]
2	(Romania) I Bara (Netherlands) L Pattinama Kerkhove	6	4	[5]

Semifinals
(Ukraine) M Kostyuk (Ukraine) L Tsurenko	4	1
3	(Serbia) A Krunić (Poland) K Piter	6	6
(Netherlands) A Rus (Egypt) M Sherif	6^{5}	6	[10]
(Poland) P Kania (Ukraine) A Shoshyna	7^{7}	2	[5]

Final
3	(Serbia) A Krunić (Poland) K Piter	6	6
(Netherlands) A Rus (Egypt) M Sherif	4	2
