= 2020 Zed Tennis Open II – Singles =

Singles
- 2020 Zed Tennis Open II

Final
- Champion: (Ukraine) Marta Kostyuk
- Runner-up: (Spain) Aliona Bolsova
- Score: 6–1, 6–0

Events
Singles	Doubles
← 2020 ·	Zed Tennis Open	· 2020 →

This was the first edition of the tournament.

Marta Kostyuk won the title, defeating Aliona Bolsova in the final, 6–1, 6–0.

== Seeds ==
1. (Russia) Vitalia Diatchenko (quarterfinals, retired)
2. (Russia) Varvara Gracheva (first round)
3. (Spain) Aliona Bolsova (final)
4. (Romania) Irina-Camelia Begu (second round, retired)
5. (Netherlands) Lesley Pattinama Kerkhove (first round)
6. (Romania) Irina Bara (second round)
7. (Bulgaria) Isabella Shinikova (quarterfinals)
8. (Romania) Elena-Gabriela Ruse (quarterfinals)

== Draw ==
=== Key ===
- Q = Qualifier
- WC = Wild card
- LL = Lucky loser
- Alt = Alternate
- SE = Special exempt
- PR = Protected ranking
- ITF = ITF entry
- JE = Junior exempt
- w/o = Walkover
- r = Retired
- d = Defaulted
- SR = Special ranking

=== Finals ===
Semifinals
Q	(Croatia) Tereza Mrdeža	3	3
3	(Spain) Aliona Bolsova	6	6
JE	(Ukraine) Daria Snigur	5	6^{4}
(Ukraine) Marta Kostyuk	7	7^{7}

Final
3	(Spain) Aliona Bolsova	1	0
(Ukraine) Marta Kostyuk	6	6

=== Top half ===
First round
1	(Russia) V Diatchenko	6	6
(Italy) M Di Giuseppe	0	2
(Russia) K Rakhimova	6	6
WC	(Spain) A Mintegi del Olmo	3	3
WC	(Egypt) L Alhussein Abdel Aziz	1	3
Q	(Croatia) T Mrdeža	6	6
Q	(Romania) G Crăciun	6	0	4
6	(Romania) I Bara	3	6	6
3	(Spain) A Bolsova	7	6
Q	(Ukraine) A Shoshyna	5	0
Q	(China) Y Yang	4	2
LL	(United Kingdom) A Carreras	6	6
(Russia) V Kan	5	6	6
(Georgia (country)) E Gorgodze	7	4	4
(Serbia) A Krunić	6	6
5	(Netherlands) L Pattinama Kerkhove	3	2

Second round
1	(Russia) V Diatchenko	6	6
(Russia) K Rakhimova	4	4
Q	(Croatia) T Mrdeža	6	6
6	(Romania) I Bara	4	4
3	(Spain) A Bolsova	6	6
LL	(United Kingdom) A Carreras	2	2
(Russia) V Kan	6	6
(Serbia) A Krunić	3	1

Quarterfinals
1	(Russia) V Diatchenko	6	5	0^{r}
Q	(Croatia) T Mrdeža	1	7	4
3	(Spain) A Bolsova	6	6
(Russia) V Kan	3	2

Semifinals
Q	(Croatia) T Mrdeža	3	3
3	(Spain) A Bolsova	6	6

=== Bottom half ===
First round
8	(Romania) E-G Ruse	6	6
Q	(Italy) S Rubini	2	4
(Russia) A Komardina	6	6
WC	(Egypt) S Samir	0	4
(Austria) J Grabher	1	6	3
JE	(Ukraine) D Snigur	6	4	6
(Egypt) M Sherif	2	2
4	(Romania) I-C Begu	6	6
7	(Bulgaria) I Shinikova	7	6
Q	(Uzbekistan) S Sharipova	5	1
(Turkey) Ç Büyükakçay	5	7^{7}	4
Q	(Russia) A Gasanova	7	6^{4}	6
Q	(Poland) K Piter	4	6	2
WC	(Austria) M Klaffner	6	1	6
(Ukraine) M Kostyuk	6	6
2	(Russia) V Gracheva	2	2

Second round
8	(Romania) E-G Ruse	6	6
(Russia) A Komardina	4	4
JE	(Ukraine) D Snigur	6	2
4	(Romania) I-C Begu	4	1^{r}
7	(Bulgaria) I Shinikova	6	7
Q	(Russia) A Gasanova	4	5
WC	(Austria) M Klaffner	1	4
(Ukraine) M Kostyuk	6	6

Quarterfinals
8	(Romania) E-G Ruse	2	1
JE	(Ukraine) D Snigur	6	6
7	(Bulgaria) I Shinikova	1	3
(Ukraine) M Kostyuk	6	6

Semifinals
JE	(Ukraine) D Snigur	5	6^{4}
(Ukraine) M Kostyuk	7	7^{7}
