= 2023 Wiphold International – Doubles =

Doubles
- 2023 Wiphold International

Final
- Champions: (Japan) Mai Hontama (France) Alice Tubello
- Runners-up: (Belgium) Sofia Costoulas (Italy) Dalila Spiteri
- Score: 6–3, 6–3

Events
| Singles | Doubles |
| ← 2022 · | Wiphold International | · 2024 → |

Eudice Chong and Cody Wong were the defending champions but chose not to participate.

Mai Hontama and Alice Tubello won the title, defeating Sofia Costoulas and Dalila Spiteri in the final, 6–3, 6–3.

== Seeds ==
1. (Greece) Valentini Grammatikopoulou / Anastasia Zakharova (quarterfinals)
2. (Hungary) Tímea Babos / (Spain) Georgina García Pérez (semifinals)
3. (United States) Emina Bektas / (Israel) Lina Glushko (quarterfinals, withdrew)
4. (Turkey) Berfu Cengiz / (Turkey) İpek Öz (withdrew)

== Draw ==
=== Key ===
- Q = Qualifier
- WC = Wild card
- LL = Lucky loser
- Alt = Alternate
- SE = Special exempt
- PR = Protected ranking
- ITF = ITF entry
- JE = Junior exempt
- w/o = Walkover
- r = Retired
- d = Defaulted
- SR = Special ranking

First round
1 | (Greece) V Grammatikopoulou; A Zakharova | 6 | 6
(France) A Robbe (Bulgaria) I Shinikova | 0 | 3
(India) S Bhasin (India) A Easwaramurthi | 1 | 0
(Japan) M Hontama (France) A Tubello | 6 | 6
Alt | (Zimbabwe) R Magarira (Nigeria) DD Nweke | 3 | 1^{r}
(Switzerland) J Dürst (Sweden) F Östlund | 6 | 4
A Korneeva (Egypt) S Samir | 6 | 1 | [10]
(United Kingdom) L John-Baptiste (United Kingdom) E Maloney | 2 | 6 | [8]
(Belgium) S Costoulas (Italy) D Spiteri | 6 | 6
E Koklina (United States) A Lahey | 4 | 4
WC | (South Africa) E McKenzie (South Africa) TT Panaino | 0 | 1
3 | (United States) E Bektas (Israel) L Glushko | 6 | 6
(Belgium) T Di Girolami (Belgium) C Vlasselaer | 6 | 6
WC | (South Africa) A Boshoff (South Africa) K Ledwaba | 1 | 0
WC | (South Africa) C Botha (South Africa) M Jordaan | 0 | 0
2 | (Hungary) T Babos (Spain) G García Pérez | 6 | 6

Quarterfinals
1 | (Greece) V Grammatikopoulou; A Zakharova | 6 | 4 | [8]
(Japan) M Hontama (France) A Tubello | 1 | 6 | [10]
(Switzerland) J Dürst (Sweden) F Östlund | 6^{2} | 4
A Korneeva (Egypt) S Samir | 7^{7} | 6
(Belgium) S Costoulas (Italy) D Spiteri | w/o
3 | (United States) E Bektas (Israel) L Glushko
(Belgium) T Di Girolami (Belgium) C Vlasselaer | 3 | 3
2 | (Hungary) T Babos (Spain) G García Pérez | 6 | 6

Semifinals
(Japan) M Hontama (France) A Tubello | 6 | 6
A Korneeva (Egypt) S Samir | 3 | 4
(Belgium) S Costoulas (Italy) D Spiteri | 6 | 3 | [10]
2 | (Hungary) T Babos (Spain) G García Pérez | 3 | 6 | [6]

Final
(Japan) M Hontama (France) A Tubello | 6 | 6
(Belgium) S Costoulas (Italy) D Spiteri | 3 | 3
