= 2023 Wiphold International =

Tennis tournament

- Date: 13–19 March 2023
- Edition: 6th
- Category: ITF Women's World Tennis Tour
- Prize money: $60,000
- Surface: Hard / Outdoor
- Location: Pretoria, South Africa

Champions

Singles
- Alina Korneeva

Doubles
- (Japan) Mai Hontama / (France) Alice Tubello
← 2022 ·	Wiphold International	· 2024 →

The 2023 Wiphold International was a professional tennis tournament played on outdoor hard courts. It was the sixth edition of the tournament, which was part of the 2023 ITF Women's World Tennis Tour. It took place in Pretoria, South Africa, between 13 and 19 March 2023.

== Champions ==
=== Singles ===
- Alina Korneeva def. (Hungary) Tímea Babos, 6–3, 7–6^{(7–3)}

=== Doubles ===
- (Japan) Mai Hontama / (France) Alice Tubello def. (Belgium) Sofia Costoulas / (Italy) Dalila Spiteri, 6–3, 6–3

== Singles main draw entrants ==
=== Seeds ===
Country	Player	Rank	Seed
CYP	Raluca Șerban	164	1
FRA	Chloé Paquet	172	2
FRA	Harmony Tan	185	3
USA	Sachia Vickery	191	4
TUR	İpek Öz	192	5
	Anastasia Zakharova	195	6
GRE	Valentini Grammatikopoulou	198	7
JPN	Mai Hontama	203	8

- Rankings are as of 6 March 2023.

=== Other entrants ===
The following players received wildcards into the singles main draw:

- (South Africa) Claire Jaramba
- (South Africa) Erin McKenzie
- (South Africa) Suzanie Pretorius
- (South Africa) Marilouise van Zyl

The following player received entry into the singles main draw using a junior exempts:

- (Belgium) Sofia Costoulas

The following players received entry from the qualifying draw:

- (Belgium) Tilwith Di Girolami
- (Spain) Georgina García Pérez
- (Japan) Mai Hontama
- Alina Korneeva
- (France) Manon Léonard
- (Egypt) Sandra Samir
- (Italy) Dalila Spiteri
- (Belgium) Clara Vlasselaer
