= 2020 Zed Tennis Open =

- Date: 10–16 February 2020
- Edition: 1st
- Category: ITF Women's World Tennis Tour
- Prize money: $100,000
- Surface: Hard
- Location: Cairo, Egypt

Champions

Singles
- (Romania) Irina-Camelia Begu

Doubles
- (Serbia) Aleksandra Krunić / (Poland) Katarzyna Piter
Zed Tennis Open	· 2020 →

The 2020 Zed Tennis Open was a professional tennis tournament played on outdoor hard courts. It was the first edition of the tournament which was part of the 2020 ITF Women's World Tennis Tour. It took place in Cairo, Egypt between 10 and 16 February 2020.

== Singles main-draw entrants ==
=== Seeds ===
Country	Player	Rank^{1}	Seed
NED	Arantxa Rus	77	1
ESP	Aliona Bolsova	111	2
ROU	Irina-Camelia Begu	117	3
UKR	Lesia Tsurenko	128	4
JPN	Kurumi Nara	137	5
ESP	Lara Arruabarrena	149	6
ITA	Martina Trevisan	151	7
ITA	Elisabetta Cocciaretto	153	8

- ^{1} Rankings are as of 3 February 2020.

=== Other entrants ===
The following players received wildcards into the singles main draw:

- (Egypt) Lamis Alhussein Abdel Aziz
- (Czech Republic) Linda Fruhvirtová
- (Egypt) Sandra Samir
- (Ukraine) Lesia Tsurenko

The following players received entry from the qualifying draw:

- (Italy) Cristiana Ferrando
- (Russia) Anastasia Gasanova
- (Spain) Ane Mintegi del Olmo
- (Poland) Katarzyna Piter
- (Serbia) Dejana Radanović
- (France) Alice Ramé
- (Belarus) Shalimar Talbi
- (Germany) Anna Zaja

== Champions ==
=== Singles ===
- (Romania) Irina-Camelia Begu def. (Ukraine) Lesia Tsurenko, 6–4, 3–6, 6–2

=== Doubles ===
- (Serbia) Aleksandra Krunić / (Poland) Katarzyna Piter def. (Netherlands) Arantxa Rus / (Egypt) Mayar Sherif, 6–4, 6–2
