= 2023 Wiphold International – Singles =

Singles
- 2023 Wiphold International

Final
- Champion: Alina Korneeva
- Runner-up: (Hungary) Tímea Babos
- Score: 6–3, 7–6^{(7–3)}

Events
Singles	Doubles
← 2022 ·	Wiphold International	· 2024 →

Anastasia Tikhonova was the defending champion but chose not to participate.

Alina Korneeva won the title, defeating Tímea Babos in the final, 6–3, 7–6^{(7–3)}.

== Seeds ==
1. (Cyprus) Raluca Șerban (semifinals)
2. (France) Chloé Paquet (second round)
3. (France) Harmony Tan (first round)
4. (United States) Sachia Vickery (quarterfinals)
5. (Turkey) İpek Öz (quarterfinals)
6. Anastasia Zakharova (first round)
7. (Greece) Valentini Grammatikopoulou (first round)
8. (Japan) Mai Hontama (first round)

== Draw ==
=== Key ===
- Q = Qualifier
- WC = Wild card
- LL = Lucky loser
- Alt = Alternate
- SE = Special exempt
- PR = Protected ranking
- ITF = ITF entry
- JE = Junior exempt
- w/o = Walkover
- r = Retired
- d = Defaulted
- SR = Special ranking

=== Finals ===
Semifinals
1	(Cyprus) Raluca Șerban	1	0
(Hungary) Tímea Babos	6	6
(United States) Emina Bektas	2	6	3
Q	Alina Korneeva	6	2	6

Final
(Hungary) Tímea Babos	3	6^{3}
Q	Alina Korneeva	6	7^{7}

=== Top half ===
First round
1	(Cyprus) R Șerban	6	6
WC	(South Africa) E McKenzie	0	0
Q	(Italy) D Spiteri	6	6
WC	(South Africa) C Jaramba	0	1
Q	(Belgium) C Vlasselaer	6	6
WC	(South Africa) S Pretorius	2	2
(Switzerland) L Sun	7	7
8/Q	(Japan) M Hontama	5	5
4	(United States) S Vickery	6	6
Q	(Belgium) T Di Girolami	0	1
Q	(Spain) G García Pérez	6	6
(United States) A Lahey	4	3
(France) A Tubello	6	6
WC	(South Africa) M van Zyl	2	1
(Hungary) T Babos	6	6
6	A Zakharova	4	2

Second round
1	(Cyprus) R Șerban	6	6
Q	(Italy) D Spiteri	2	2
Q	(Belgium) C Vlasselaer	3	6^{5}
(Switzerland) L Sun	6	7^{7}
4	(United States) S Vickery	6	7
Q	(Spain) G García Pérez	0	5
(France) A Tubello	1	5
(Hungary) T Babos	6	7

Quarterfinals
1	(Cyprus) R Șerban	7^{7}	3	6
(Switzerland) L Sun	6^{5}	6	4
4	(United States) S Vickery	2	6	1
(Hungary) T Babos	6	3	6

Semifinals
1	(Cyprus) R Șerban	1	0
(Hungary) T Babos	6	6

=== Bottom half ===
First round
7	(Greece) V Grammatikopoulou	2	6	1
(France) A Robbe	6	2	6
(Switzerland) J Dürst	3	4
(United States) E Bektas	6	6
(France) S Janicijevic	6	1	0
Q	(France) M Léonard	4	6	6
(Israel) L Glushko	6	6
3	(France) H Tan	4	3
5	(Turkey) İ Öz	6	6
(Turkey) B Cengiz	4	0
JE	(Belgium) S Costoulas	6	6
(France) L Nguyen Tan	3	1
Q	(Egypt) S Samir	1	1
Q	A Korneeva	6	6
(South Africa) I Kruger	4	6^{6}
2	(France) C Paquet	6	7^{8}

Second round
(France) A Robbe	6	3	2
(United States) E Bektas	4	6	6
Q	(France) M Léonard	6	3	6
(Israel) L Glushko	4	6	3
5	(Turkey) İ Öz	7^{12}	6
JE	(Belgium) S Costoulas	6^{10}	1
Q	A Korneeva	6	6
2	(France) C Paquet	4	4

Quarterfinals
(United States) E Bektas	7^{7}	6
Q	(France) M Léonard	6^{2}	3
5	(Turkey) İ Öz	1	3
Q	A Korneeva	6	6

Semifinals
(United States) E Bektas	2	6	3
Q	A Korneeva	6	2	6
