= 2020 Zed Tennis Open II – Doubles =

Doubles
- 2020 Zed Tennis Open II

Final
- Champions: (Ukraine) Marta Kostyuk (Russia) Kamilla Rakhimova
- Runners-up: (Poland) Paula Kania (Ukraine) Anastasiya Shoshyna
- Score: 6–3, 2–6, [10–6]

Events
Singles	Doubles
← 2020 ·	Zed Tennis Open	· 2020 →

This was the first edition of the tournament.

Marta Kostyuk and Kamilla Rakhimova won the title, defeating Paula Kania and Anastasiya Shoshyna in the final, 6–3, 2–6, [10–6].

== Seeds ==
1. (Romania) Irina Bara / (Netherlands) Lesley Pattinama Kerkhove (semifinals)
2. (Serbia) Aleksandra Krunić / (Poland) Katarzyna Piter (semifinals)
3. (Spain) Aliona Bolsova / (Croatia) Tereza Mrdeža (first round)
4. (Russia) Anastasia Gasanova / (Bulgaria) Isabella Shinikova (quarterfinals)

== Draw ==
=== Key ===
- Q = Qualifier
- WC = Wild card
- LL = Lucky loser
- Alt = Alternate
- SE = Special exempt
- PR = Protected ranking
- ITF = ITF entry
- JE = Junior exempt
- w/o = Walkover
- r = Retired
- d = Defaulted
- SR = Special ranking

=== Draw ===
First round
1	(Romania) I Bara (Netherlands) L Pattinama Kerkhove	4	6	[10]
WC	(Austria) M Klaffner (Egypt) S Samir	6	3	[7]
WC	(Egypt) S Elkhurashy (Mexico) MdMG Sánchez Ramírez	0	0
(Uzbekistan) S Sharipova (Belarus) S Talbi	6	6
3	(Spain) A Bolsova (Croatia) T Mrdeža	6	4	[6]
(Poland) P Kania (Ukraine) A Shoshyna	2	6	[10]
(Georgia (country)) E Gorgodze (Russia) V Kan	4	6	[10]
(Italy) C Ferrando (Italy) S Rubini	6	2	[6]
(Montenegro) V Babić (Egypt) M Sherif	2	7^{7}	[4]
(Ukraine) M Kostyuk (Russia) K Rakhimova	6	6^{5}	[10]
(Italy) M Di Giuseppe (Greece) D Papamichail	2	6	[6]
4	(Russia) A Gasanova (Bulgaria) I Shinikova	6	4	[10]
(France) T Andrianjafitrimo (Austria) J Grabher	w/o
(Russia) V Gracheva (Russia) A Komardina
WC	(Spain) A Lantigua de la Nuez (Spain) A Mintegi del Olmo	1	0
2	(Serbia) A Krunić (Poland) K Piter	6	6

Quarterfinals
1	(Romania) I Bara (Netherlands) L Pattinama Kerkhove	5
(Uzbekistan) S Sharipova (Belarus) S Talbi	2^{r}
(Poland) P Kania (Ukraine) A Shoshyna	w/o
(Georgia (country)) E Gorgodze (Russia) V Kan
(Ukraine) M Kostyuk (Russia) K Rakhimova	6	6
4	(Russia) A Gasanova (Bulgaria) I Shinikova	3	3
(France) T Andrianjafitrimo (Austria) J Grabher	0	3
2	(Serbia) A Krunić (Poland) K Piter	6	6

Semifinals
1	(Romania) I Bara (Netherlands) L Pattinama Kerkhove	6^{6}	3
(Poland) P Kania (Ukraine) A Shoshyna	7^{8}	6
(Ukraine) M Kostyuk (Russia) K Rakhimova	6	6
2	(Serbia) A Krunić (Poland) K Piter	1	4

Final
(Poland) P Kania (Ukraine) A Shoshyna	3	6	[6]
(Ukraine) M Kostyuk (Russia) K Rakhimova	6	2	[10]
