= Lesia Tsurenko career statistics =

Career finals
| Discipline | Type | Won | Lost | Total | WR |
|---|---|---|---|---|---|
| Singles | Grand Slam | – | – | – | – |
| Singles | WTA Finals | – | – | – | – |
| Singles | WTA 1000 | – | – | – | – |
| Singles | WTA Tour | 4 | 2 | 6 | 0.67 |
| Singles | Olympics | – | – | – | – |
| Singles | Total | 4 | 2 | 6 | 0.67 |
| Doubles | Grand Slam | – | – | – | – |
| Doubles | WTA Finals | – | – | – | – |
| Doubles | WTA 1000 | – | – | – | – |
| Doubles | WTA Tour | – | – | – | – |
| Doubles | Olympics | – | – | – | – |
| Doubles | Total | – | – | – | – |

This is a list of the main career statistics of professional Ukrainian tennis player Lesia Tsurenko.

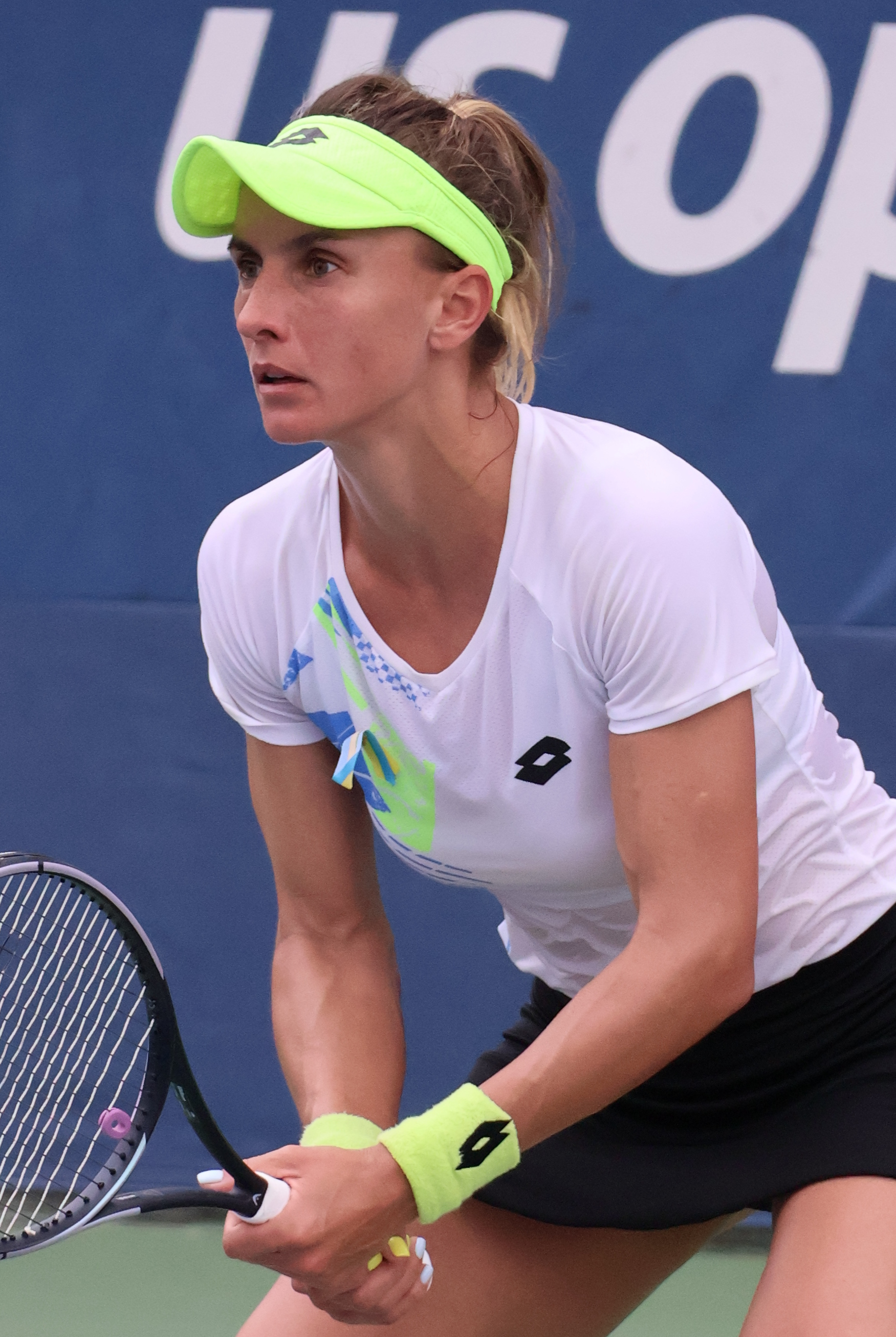
Tsurenko at the 2023 US Open

== Performance timelines ==
Key
| W | F | SF | QF | #R | RR | Q# | P# | DNQ | A | Z# | PO | G | S | B | NMS | NTI | P | NH |

(W) winner; (F) finalist; (SF) semifinalist; (QF) quarterfinalist; (#R) rounds 4, 3, 2, 1; (RR) round-robin stage; (Q#) qualification round; (P#) preliminary round; (DNQ) did not qualify; (A) absent; (Z#) Davis/Fed Cup Zonal Group (with number indication) or (PO) play-off; (G) gold, (S) silver or (B) bronze Olympic/Paralympic medal; (NMS) not a Masters tournament; (NTI) not a Tier I tournament; (P) postponed; (NH) not held; (SR) strike rate (events won / competed); (W–L) win–loss record.
To avoid confusion and double counting, these charts are updated at the conclusion of a tournament or when the player's participation has ended.

Only main-draw results in WTA Tour, Grand Slam tournaments, Fed Cup/Billie Jean King Cup, United Cup, Hopman Cup and Olympic Games are included in win–loss records.

=== Singles ===
Current after the 2023 US Open.

| Tournament | 2009 | 2010 | 2011 | 2012 | 2013 | 2014 | 2015 | 2016 | 2017 | 2018 | 2019 | 2020 | 2021 | 2022 | 2023 | 2024 | SR | W–L | Win % |
|---|---|---|---|---|---|---|---|---|---|---|---|---|---|---|---|---|---|---|---|
Grand Slam tournaments
| Australian Open | A | A | 2R | 2R | 3R | 1R | 1R | 1R | 1R | 2R | 2R | 1R | Q3 | 1R | 1R | 3R | 0 / 13 | 8–13 | 38% |
| French Open | A | Q2 | Q1 | 1R | 1R | Q2 | 1R | 1R | 3R | 4R | 3R | Q1 | Q2 | 1R | 4R | 1R | 0 / 10 | 10–10 | 50% |
| Wimbledon | A | Q1 | 1R | 1R | 2R | 2R | 2R | 1R | 3R | 2R | 1R | NH | A | 3R | 4R | 1R | 0 / 12 | 11–12 | 48% |
| US Open | A | Q1 | Q1 | 1R | 1R | 1R | 2R | 4R | 1R | QF | A | A | Q2 | 1R | 2R | 1R | 0 / 10 | 9–10 | 47% |
| Win–loss | 0–0 | 0–0 | 1–2 | 1–4 | 3–4 | 1–3 | 2–4 | 3–4 | 4–4 | 9–4 | 3–3 | 0–1 | 0–0 | 2–4 | 7–4 | 2–4 | 0 / 45 | 38–45 | 46% |
National representation
| Billie Jean King Cup (Note: Formerly known as Fed Cup until 2020.) | A | A | PO | 1R | WG2 | A | Z1 | PO2 | PO | WG2 | Z1 | PO (Note: Edition is split into the two years due to COVID-19.) | | A | | | 0 / 1 | 11–13 | 46% |
WTA 1000
| Qatar Open (Note: The first Premier 5 event of the year has switched back and forth between the Dubai Tennis Championships and the Qatar Total Open since 2009. Dubai was classified as a Premier 5 event from 2009 to 2011 before being succeeded by Doha for the 2012–2014 period. In 2015, Dubai regained its Premier 5 status while Doha was demoted to Premier status. The Premier 5 tournaments were reclassified as WTA 1000 tournaments in 2021.) | NMS | | | Q1 | A | A | NMS | 1R | NMS | 1R | NMS | Q1 | NMS | A | A | 3R | 0 / 3 | 2–2 | 50% |
| Dubai | A | A | A | NMS | | | A | NMS | 1R | NMS | 3R | NMS | 1R | A | A | A | 0 / 3 | 2–3 | 40% |
| Indian Wells Open | A | A | Q1 | 2R | 3R | A | QF | 3R | 1R | 1R | 3R | NH | A | Q2 | 3R (Note: Withdrew during the tournament. Not counted as a loss.) | 2R | 0 / 9 | 13–8 | 62% |
| Miami Open | A | A | Q1 | Q1 | 1R | A | A | 2R | 1R | 1R | A | NH | A | 2R | 1R | 2R | 0 / 7 | 2–7 | 22% |
| Madrid Open | A | A | A | Q1 | 1R | A | Q1 | 1R | 1R | 1R | 1R | NH | A | A | 3R | 1R | 0 / 7 | 2–7 | 22% |
| Italian Open | A | A | A | Q2 | 1R | A | Q2 | 2R | 2R | 1R | 1R | A | A | A | 3R | 2R | 0 / 7 | 5–7 | 42% |
| Canadian Open | A | A | A | A | A | A | QF | A | 1R | 2R | A | NH | A | A | Q2 | 2R | 0 / 4 | 5–4 | 56% |
| Cincinnati Open | A | A | A | Q1 | A | A | A | 2R | 2R | QF | A | A | A | A | Q1 | Q1 | 0 / 3 | 5–3 | 63% |
| Guadalajara Open | NH | | | | | | | | | | | | | A | A | NMS | 0 / 0 | 0–0 | – |
| Pan Pacific / Wuhan Open (Note: In 2014, the Toray Pan Pacific Open was downgraded to a Premier event and replaced by the Wuhan Open. The Premier 5 tournaments were reclassified as WTA 1000 tournaments in 2021.) | A | A | A | A | A | A | 1R | A | 2R | 1R | A | NH | | | | 2R | 0 / 4 | 2–4 | 33% |
| China Open | A | A | A | A | Q2 | A | 1R | A | 1R | 2R | A | A | NH | | | A | 0 / 3 | 1–3 | 25% |
| Win–loss | 0–0 | 0–0 | 0–0 | 1–1 | 2–4 | 0–0 | 7–4 | 5–6 | 3–9 | 5–9 | 3–4 | 0–0 | 0–1 | 0–1 | 6–3 | 7–8 | 0 / 44 | 40–51 | 44% |
Career statistics
| | 2009 | 2010 | 2011 | 2012 | 2013 | 2014 | 2015 | 2016 | 2017 | 2018 | 2019 | 2020 | 2021 | 2022 | 2023 | 2024 | SR | W–L | Win % |
| Tournaments | 1 | 3 | 7 | 12 | 18 | 8 | 18 | 21 | 25 | 20 | 14 | 3 | 10 | 11 | 12 | 22 | Career total: 183 | | |
| Titles | 0 | 0 | 0 | 0 | 0 | 0 | 1 | 1 | 1 | 1 | 0 | 0 | 0 | 0 | 0 | 0 | 0 | Career total: 4 | |
| Finals | 0 | 0 | 0 | 0 | 0 | 0 | 1 | 1 | 1 | 1 | 1 | 0 | 0 | 0 | 1 | 0 | Career total: 6 | | |
| Hard win–loss | 0–1 | 0–1 | 2–6 | 4–7 | 7–10 | 3–6 | 20–13 | 19–11 | 14–14 | 21–14 | 10–7 | 0–2 | 5–9 | 2–4 | 7–6 | 14–17 | 4 / 113 | 128–128 | 50% |
| Clay win–loss | 0–0 | 1–2 | 2–3 | 5–6 | 1–8 | 0–1 | 1–1 | 4–5 | 3–7 | 3–3 | 2–4 | 1–0 | 1–1 | 3–3 | 8–4 | 2–5 | 0 / 44 | 37–53 | 41% |
| Grass win–loss | 0–0 | 0–0 | 0–1 | 0–1 | 3–3 | 1–1 | 1–3 | 1–3 | 5–4 | 3–2 | 2–4 | 0–0 | 0–0 | 5–2 | 3–1 | 0–1 | 0 / 26 | 24–25 | 48% |
| Overall win–loss | 0–1 | 1–3 | 4–10 | 9–14 | 11–21 | 4–8 | 22–17 | 24–19 | 22–25 | 27–19 | 14–15 | 1–2 | 6–10 | 10–9 | 18–11 | 16–23 | 4 / 183 | 189–184 | 46% |
| Win (%) | 0% | 25% | 29% | 39% | 34% | 33% | 56% | 56% | 47% | 59% | 48% | 33% | 38% | 53% | 62% | 41% | Career total: 48% | | |
| Year–end ranking (Note: 2007: WTA ranking–663, 2008: WTA ranking–353.) | 265 | 184 | 120 | 102 | 70 | 96 | 33 | 58 | 42 | 27 | 70 | 146 | 119 | 130 | 31 | 118 | $6,136,159 | | |

=== Doubles ===
| Tournament | 2011 | 2012 | 2013 | 2014 | 2015 | 2016 | 2017 | 2018 | 2019 | 2020 | SR | W–L | Win% |
|---|---|---|---|---|---|---|---|---|---|---|---|---|---|
Grand Slam tournaments
| Australian Open | A | A | A | 1R | A | A | A | A | A | A | 0 / 1 | 0–1 | 0% |
| French Open | A | 1R | 1R | A | 1R | A | 1R | 1R | A | A | 0 / 5 | 0–5 | 0% |
| Wimbledon | Q1 | A | A | A | A | 1R | 3R | A | 2R | A | 0 / 3 | 3–3 | 50% |
| US Open | A | A | A | A | 2R | A | A | A | A | A | 0 / 1 | 1–1 | 50% |
| Win–loss | 0–0 | 0–1 | 0–1 | 0–1 | 1–2 | 0–1 | 2–2 | 0–1 | 1–1 | 0–0 | 0 / 10 | 4–10 | 29% |
WTA 1000
| Dubai / Qatar Open | A | A | A | A | A | A | A | A | A | A | 0 / 0 | 0–0 | – |
| Indian Wells Open | A | A | A | A | A | A | A | A | A | A | 0 / 0 | 0–0 | – |
| Miami Open | A | A | A | A | A | A | A | 2R | A | A | 0 / 1 | 1–1 | 50% |
| Madrid Open | A | A | A | A | A | A | A | A | 2R | A | 0 / 1 | 1–1 | 50% |
| Italian Open | A | A | A | A | A | A | A | A | QF | A | 0 / 1 | 2–1 | 67% |
| Canadian Open | A | A | A | A | A | A | A | A | A | | 0 / 0 | 0–0 | – |
| Cincinnati Open | A | A | A | A | A | A | QF | A | A | | 0 / 1 | 1–1 | 50% |
| Pan Pacific / Wuhan Open (Note: In 2014, the Pan Pacific Open was downgraded to a Premier event and replaced by the Wuhan Open. The Premier 5 tournaments were reclassified as WTA 1000 tournaments in 2021.) | A | A | A | A | A | A | A | A | A | | 0 / 0 | 0–0 | – |
| China Open | A | A | A | A | A | A | A | A | A | | 0 / 0 | 0–0 | – |
Career statistics
| Year-end ranking | 213 | 484 | n/a | 525 | 354 | 1119 | 164 | 337 | 142 | | | | |

== WTA Tour finals ==
=== Singles: 6 (4 titles, 2 runner-ups) ===
| Legend Grand Slam WTA 1000 WTA 500 (0–1) WTA 250 (4–1) | Finals by surface Hard (4–2) Clay (0–0) Grass (0–0) Carpet (0–0) |

| Result | W–L | Date | Tournament | Tier | Surface | Opponent | Score |
|---|---|---|---|---|---|---|---|
| Win | 1–0 | Jul 2015 | İstanbul Cup, Turkey | International (Note: The WTA International tournaments were reclassified as WTA 250 tournaments in 2021.) | Hard | (Poland) Urszula Radwańska | 7–5, 6–1 |
| Win | 2–0 | Sep 2016 | Guangzhou Open, China | International | Hard | (Serbia) Jelena Janković | 6–4, 3–6, 6–4 |
| Win | 3–0 | Mar 2017 | Abierto Mexicano, Mexico | International | Hard | (France) Kristina Mladenovic | 6–1, 7–5 |
| Win | 4–0 | Mar 2018 | Abierto Mexicano, Mexico (2) | International | Hard | (Switzerland) Stefanie Vögele | 5–7, 7–6^{(7–2)}, 6–2 |
| Loss | 4–1 | Jan 2019 | Brisbane International, Australia | Premier (Note: The WTA Premier tournaments were reclassified as WTA 500 tournaments in 2021.) | Hard | (Czech Republic) Karolína Plíšková | 6–4, 5–7, 2–6 |
| Loss | 4–2 | Feb 2023 | Hua Hin Championships, Thailand | WTA 250 | Hard | (China) Zhu Lin | 4–6, 4–6 |

== ITF finals ==
=== Singles: 13 (6 titles, 7 runner–ups) ===
| Legend $100,000 tournaments (0–2) $80,000 tournaments (0–0) $60,000 tournaments (0–1) $25,000 tournaments (4–3) $10,000 tournaments (2–1) | Finals by surface Hard (3–4) Clay (2–3) Grass (0–0) Carpet (1–0) |

| Result | W–L | Date | Tournament | Tier | Surface | Opponent | Score |
|---|---|---|---|---|---|---|---|
| Loss | 0–1 | Sep 2007 | ITF Baku, Azerbaijan | 10,000 | Clay | (Georgia (country)) Tinatin Kavlashvili | 3–6, 4–6 |
| Win | 1–1 | Apr 2008 | ITF Adana, Turkey | 10,000 | Clay | (Brazil) Vivian Segnini | 4–6, 6–1, 6–1 |
| Win | 2–1 | Oct 2008 | ITF Kharkiv, Ukraine | 10,000 | Carpet (i) | (Russia) Elina Gasanova | 6–3, 6–1 |
| Loss | 2–2 | Feb 2010 | ITF Stockholm, Sweden | 25,000 | Hard (i) | (Ukraine) Oxana Lyubtsova | 4–6, 5–7 |
| Loss | 2–3 | Mar 2010 | ITF Minsk, Belarus | 25,000 | Hard (i) | (Russia) Anna Lapushchenkova | 1–6, 6–3, 6–7^{(2–7)} |
| Win | 3–3 | Nov 2010 | ITF Minsk, Belarus | 25,000 | Hard (i) | (Netherlands) Richèl Hogenkamp | 6–3, 6–2 |
| Loss | 3–4 | Mar 2011 | ITF Ipswich, Australia | 25,000 | Clay | (Australia) Sally Peers | 7–5, 5–7, 0–6 |
| Win | 4–4 | Sep 2011 | ITF Tbilisi, Georgia | 25,000 | Clay | (Hungary) Réka Luca Jani | 7–6^{(7–3)}, 6–3 |
| Win | 5–4 | Oct 2011 | ITF İstanbul, Turkey | 25,000 | Hard (i) | (Russia) Irina Khromacheva | 6–1, 7–5 |
| Win | 6–4 | Nov 2011 | ITF Bratislava, Slovakia | 25,000 | Hard (i) | (Czech Republic) Karolína Plíšková | 7–5, 6–3 |
| Loss | 6–5 | Sep 2012 | Telavi Open, Georgia | 50,000 (Note: The $50,000 tournaments were reclassified as $60,000 in 2017.) | Clay | (Ukraine) Elina Svitolina | 1–6, 2–6 |
| Loss | 6–6 | Aug 2014 | Vancouver Open, Canada | 100,000 | Hard | (Australia) Jarmila Wolfe | 6–3, 2–6, 6–7^{(3–7)} |
| Loss | 6–7 | Feb 2020 | Cairo Open, Egypt | 100,000 | Hard | (Romania) Irina-Camelia Begu | 4–6, 6–3, 2–6 |

=== Doubles: 16 (8 titles, 8 runner–ups) ===
| Legend $100,000 tournaments (1–0) $80,000 tournaments (0–0) $60,000 tournaments (3–4) $25,000 tournaments (4–2) $10,000 tournaments (0–2) | Finals by surface Hard (4–1) Clay (2–7) Grass (0–0) Carpet (2–0) |

| Result | W–L | Date | Tournament | Tier | Surface | Partner | Opponents | Score |
|---|---|---|---|---|---|---|---|---|
| Loss | 0–1 | Sep 2007 | ITF Baku, Azerbaijan | 10,000 | Clay | (Ukraine) Kateryna Yergina | (Russia) Vasilisa Davydova (Russia) Avgusta Tsybysheva | 5–7, 6–4, [7–10] |
| Loss | 0–2 | Jun 2008 | ITF Breda, Netherlands | 10,000 | Clay | (Belarus) Ima Bohush | (Netherlands) Daniëlle Harmsen (Netherlands) Renée Reinhard | w/o |
| Loss | 0–3 | Jul 2008 | ITF Kharkiv, Ukraine | 25,000 | Clay | (Ukraine) Khrystyna Antoniichuk | (Romania) Mihaela Buzărnescu (Georgia (country)) Oksana Kalashnikova | 1–6, 4–6 |
| Win | 1–3 | Sep 2008 | ITF Alphen a/d Rijn, Netherlands | 25,000 | Clay | (Argentina) Florencia Molinero | (Croatia) Darija Jurak (Serbia) Vojislava Lukić | 4–6, 7–5, [10–7] |
| Win | 2–3 | Sep 2008 | ITF Qarshi, Uzbekistan | 25,000 | Hard | (Belarus) Ima Bohush | (Uzbekistan) Albina Khabibulina (Uzbekistan) Alexandra Kolesnichenko | 6–3, 6–1 |
| Win | 3–3 | Oct 2008 | ITF Podolsk, Russia | 50,000 | Carpet (i) | (Russia) Anastasia Poltoratskaya | (Belarus) Ima Bohush (Belarus) Darya Kustova | 7–6^{(9–7)}, 1–6, [10–3] |
| Loss | 3–4 | Nov 2008 | ITF Minsk, Belarus | 50,000 | Hard (i) | (Russia) Anastasia Poltoratskaya | (Russia) Alisa Kleybanova (Belarus) Tatiana Poutchek | 1–6, 2–6 |
| Win | 4–4 | Mar 2009 | Yugra Cup, Russia | 50,000 | Carpet (i) | (Belarus) Ksenia Milevskaya | (Georgia (country)) Oksana Kalashnikova (Russia) Valeria Savinykh | 6–2, 6–3 |
| Win | 5–4 | Apr 2009 | Soweto Open, South Africa | 100,000 | Hard | (United Kingdom) Naomi Cavaday | (Slovakia) Kristína Kučová (Latvia) Anastasija Sevastova | 6–2, 2–6, [11–9] |
| Win | 6–4 | May 2009 | ITF Kharkiv, Ukraine | 25,000 | Clay | (Belarus) Ksenia Milevskaya | (Ukraine) Lyudmyla Kichenok (Ukraine) Nadiia Kichenok | 6–4, 6–4 |
| Win | 7–4 | Feb 2010 | ITF Stockholm, Sweden | 25,000 | Hard (i) | (Belarus) Ksenia Milevskaya | (Austria) Nikola Hofmanova (Austria) Yvonne Meusburger | 6–4, 7–5 |
| Loss | 7–5 | May 2010 | ITF Jounieh, Lebanon | 50,000 | Clay | (Belarus) Ksenia Milevskaya | (Czech Republic) Petra Cetkovská (Czech Republic) Renata Voráčová | 4–6, 2–6 |
| Loss | 7–6 | May 2010 | ITF Brno, Czech Republic | 25,000 | Clay | (Belarus) Darya Kustova | (Germany) Carmen Klaschka (Germany) Laura Siegemund | w/o |
| Win | 8–6 | Aug 2010 | Tatarstan Open, Russia | 50,000 | Hard | (Belarus) Ekaterina Dzehalevich | (Uzbekistan) Albina Khabibulina (Kyrgyzstan) Ksenia Palkina | 6–2, 6–3 |
| Loss | 8–7 | May 2011 | Prague Open, Czech Republic | 50,000 | Clay | (Ukraine) Olga Savchuk | (Belarus) Darya Kustova (Russia) Arina Rodionova | 6–2, 1–6, [7–10] |
| Loss | 8–8 | Mar 2012 | ITF Osprey, United States | 50,000 | Clay | (Russia) Alexandra Panova | (United States) Lindsay Lee-Waters (United States) Megan Moulton-Levy | 6–2, 4–6, [7–10] |

== Best Grand Slam tournament results details ==
Grand Slam winners are in boldface, and runner–ups are in italics.

Australian Open
2013 Australian Open (unseeded)
| Round | Opponent | Rank | Score |
|---|---|---|---|
| 1R | (Russia) Anastasia Pavlyuchenkova (24) | 23 | 7–5, 3–6, 7–5 |
| 2R | (Russia) Daria Gavrilova (Q) | 223 | 7–5, 6–3 |
| 3R | (Denmark) Caroline Wozniacki (10) | **10** | 4–6, 3–6 |

Wimbledon Championships
2023 Wimbledon (unseeded)
| Round | Opponent | Rank | Score |
|---|---|---|---|
| 1R | (United States) Claire Liu | 93 | 6–3, 3–6, 6–4 |
| 2R | (Czech Republic) Kateřina Siniaková | 32 | 6–4, 6–1 |
| 3R | (Romania) Ana Bogdan | 57 | 4–6, 6–3, 7–6^{(20–18)} |
| 4R | (United States) Jessica Pegula (4) | **4** | 1–6, 3–6 |

French Open
2018 French Open (unseeded)
| Round | Opponent | Rank | Score |
|---|---|---|---|
| 1R | (Switzerland) Stefanie Vögele | 99 | 4–6, 6–2, 6–2 |
| 2R | (United States) CoCo Vandeweghe (15) | 15 | 3–6, 6–4, 6–0 |
| 3R | (Slovakia) Magdaléna Rybáriková (19) | 18 | 6–2, 6–4 |
| 4R | (Spain) Garbiñe Muguruza (3) | **3** | 0–2 ret. |
2023 French Open (unseeded)
| 1R | (Czech Republic) Barbora Krejčíková (13) | 13 | 6–2, 6–4 |
| 2R | (United States) Lauren Davis | 52 | 6–3, 1–0 ret. |
| 3R | (Canada) Bianca Andreescu | 42 | 6–1, 6–1 |
| 4R | (Poland) **Iga Świątek (1)** | **1** | 1–5 ret. |

US Open
2018 US Open (unseeded)
| Round | Opponent | Rank | Score |
|---|---|---|---|
| 1R | (Belgium) Alison Van Uytvanck | 39 | 6–3, 6–2 |
| 2R | (Denmark) Caroline Wozniacki (2) | **2** | 6–4, 6–2 |
| 3R | (Czech Republic) Kateřina Siniaková | 54 | 6–4, 6–0 |
| 4R | (Czech Republic) Markéta Vondroušová | 103 | 6–7^{(3–7)}, 7–5, 6–2 |
| QF | (Japan) **Naomi Osaka (20)** | 19 | 1–6, 1–6 |

== Top 10 wins ==
| # | Opponent | Rk | Event | Surface | Rd | Score | Ref |
|---|---|---|---|---|---|---|---|
2015
| 1. | (Germany) Andrea Petkovic | 10 | Indian Wells Open, United States | Hard | 2R | 6–3, 4–6, 6–4 | |
| 2. | (Canada) Eugenie Bouchard | 7 | Indian Wells Open, United States | Hard | 4R | 6–7^{(5–7)}, 7–5, 6–4 | |
| 3. | (Spain) Garbiñe Muguruza | 9 | Canadian Open, Canada | Hard | 2R | 7–5, 6–1 | |
| 4. | (Czech Republic) Karolína Plíšková | 8 | Connecticut Open, United States | Hard | QF | 6–2, 6–2 | |
| 5. | (Czech Republic) Lucie Šafářová | 6 | US Open, United States | Hard | 1R | 6–4, 6–1 | |
2018
| 6. | (Spain) Garbiñe Muguruza | 9 | Cincinnati Open, United States | Hard | 2R | 2–6, 6–4, 6–4 | |
| 7. | (Denmark) Caroline Wozniacki | 2 | US Open, United States | Hard | 2R | 6–4, 6–2 | |
2019
| 8. | (Japan) Naomi Osaka | 5 | Brisbane International, Australia | Hard | SF | 6–2, 6–4 | |
2024
| 9. | (Tunisia) Ons Jabeur | 6 | Qatar Open, Qatar | Hard | 2R | 6–3, 6–2 | |
