= 2020 Zed Tennis Open – Singles =

Singles
- 2020 Zed Tennis Open

Final
- Champion: (Romania) Irina-Camelia Begu
- Runner-up: (Ukraine) Lesia Tsurenko
- Score: 6–4, 3–6, 6–2

Events
Singles	Doubles
Zed Tennis Open	· 2020 →

This was the first edition of the tournament.

Irina-Camelia Begu won the title, defeating Lesia Tsurenko in the final, 6–4, 3–6, 6–2.

== Seeds ==
1. (Netherlands) Arantxa Rus (semifinals)
2. (Spain) Aliona Bolsova (semifinals)
3. (Romania) Irina-Camelia Begu (champion)
4. (Ukraine) Lesia Tsurenko (final)
5. (Japan) Kurumi Nara (quarterfinals)
6. (Spain) Lara Arruabarrena (quarterfinals)
7. (Italy) Martina Trevisan (quarterfinals)
8. (Italy) Elisabetta Cocciaretto (first round)

== Draw ==
=== Key ===
- Q = Qualifier
- WC = Wild card
- LL = Lucky loser
- Alt = Alternate
- SE = Special exempt
- PR = Protected ranking
- ITF = ITF entry
- JE = Junior exempt
- w/o = Walkover
- r = Retired
- d = Defaulted
- SR = Special ranking

=== Finals ===
Semifinals
1	(Netherlands) Arantxa Rus	5	0
4/WC	(Ukraine) Lesia Tsurenko	7	6
3	(Romania) Irina-Camelia Begu	6	3	6
2	(Spain) Aliona Bolsova	2	6	1

Final
4/WC	(Ukraine) Lesia Tsurenko	4	6	2
3	(Romania) Irina-Camelia Begu	6	3	6

=== Top half ===
First round
1	(Netherlands) A Rus	6	6
(Ukraine) D Snigur	4	3
Q	(France) A Ramé	3	1
Q	(Spain) A Mintegi del Olmo	6	6
(Egypt) M Sherif	7	7^{7}
(Slovakia) K Kučová	5	6^{1}
(France) T Andrianjafitrimo	3	4
5	(Japan) K Nara	6	6
4/WC	(Ukraine) L Tsurenko	6	6
WC	(Egypt) L Alhussein Abdel Aziz	2	3
WC	(Egypt) S Samir	6	1	6^{3}
(Netherlands) L Pattinama Kerkhove	4	6	7^{7}
(Japan) Y Naito	3	6	2
(Turkey) Ç Büyükakçay	6	2	6
(Netherlands) R Hogenkamp	2	7	2
6	(Spain) L Arruabarrena	6	5	6

Second round
1	(Netherlands) A Rus	6	6
Q	(Spain) A Mintegi del Olmo	0	1
(Egypt) M Sherif	3	3
5	(Japan) K Nara	6	6
4/WC	(Ukraine) L Tsurenko	6	6
(Netherlands) L Pattinama Kerkhove	2	2
(Turkey) Ç Büyükakçay	5	2
6	(Spain) L Arruabarrena	7	6

Quarterfinals
1	(Netherlands) A Rus	6	6
5	(Japan) K Nara	3	0
4/WC	(Ukraine) L Tsurenko	7^{8}	6
6	(Spain) L Arruabarrena	6^{6}	2

Semifinals
1	(Netherlands) A Rus	5	0
4/WC	(Ukraine) L Tsurenko	7	6

=== Bottom half ===
First round
8	(Italy) E Cocciaretto	3	1
Q	(Russia) A Gasanova	6	6
(Croatia) T Mrdeža	6	6
Q	(Belarus) S Talbi	0	1
Q	(Poland) K Piter	6	1	2
WC	(Czech Republic) L Fruhvirtová	2	6	6
(Ukraine) M Kostyuk	6	1	5
3	(Romania) I-C Begu	2	6	7
7	(Italy) M Trevisan	6	6
(Romania) I Bara	3	2
Q	(Germany) A Zaja	6	3	7
Q	(Serbia) D Radanović	4	6	5
Q	(Italy) C Ferrando	1	2
(Georgia (country)) E Gorgodze	6	6
(Serbia) A Krunić	2	6	6^{2}
2	(Spain) A Bolsova	6	3	7^{7}

Second round
Q	(Russia) A Gasanova	6	5	7
(Croatia) T Mrdeža	1	7	5
WC	(Czech Republic) L Fruhvirtová	5	0
3	(Romania) I-C Begu	7	6
7	(Italy) M Trevisan	6	6
Q	(Germany) A Zaja	0	3
(Georgia (country)) E Gorgodze	2	4
2	(Spain) A Bolsova	6	6

Quarterfinals
Q	(Russia) A Gasanova	6	3	1
3	(Romania) I-C Begu	4	6	6
7	(Italy) M Trevisan	3	4
2	(Spain) A Bolsova	6	6

Semifinals
3	(Romania) I-C Begu	6	3	6
2	(Spain) A Bolsova	2	6	1
