= 2022 Tuks International =

Tennis tournament

- Date: 28 March–3 April 2022
- Edition: 3rd
- Category: ITF Women's World Tennis Tour
- Prize money: $60,000
- Surface: Hard / Outdoor
- Location: Pretoria, South Africa

Champions

Singles
- Anastasia Tikhonova

Doubles
- (Hong Kong) Eudice Chong / (Hong Kong) Cody Wong Hong-yi
- Tuks International

The 2022 Tuks International was a professional tennis tournament played on outdoor hard courts. It was the third edition of the tournament which was part of the 2022 ITF Women's World Tennis Tour. It took place in Pretoria, South Africa between 28 March and 3 April 2022.

== Singles main draw entrants ==
=== Seeds ===
Country	Player	Rank^{1}	Seed
FRA	Tessah Andrianjafitrimo	152	1
	Valeria Savinykh	188	2
GBR	Jodie Burrage	204	3
NED	Richèl Hogenkamp	209	4
GBR	Katie Swan	216	5
	Anastasia Tikhonova	226	6
SUI	Joanne Züger	228	7
GBR	Yuriko Miyazaki	238	8

- ^{1} Rankings are as of 21 March 2022.

=== Other entrants ===
The following players received wildcards into the singles main draw:

- (South Africa) Isabella Kruger
- (South Africa) Zoë Kruger
- (South Africa) Relebogile Sereo
- (South Africa) Tayla Wilmot

The following player received entry using a protected ranking:

- (Germany) Katharina Hobgarski

The following players received entry from the qualifying draw:

- (Hong Kong) Eudice Chong
- (Serbia) Tamara Čurović
- (Germany) Anna Gabric
- (Hungary) Adrienn Nagy
- (Egypt) Sandra Samir
- (Hong Kong) Cody Wong Hong-yi

== Champions ==
=== Singles ===
- Anastasia Tikhonova def. (Israel) Lina Glushko, 5–7, 6–3, 6–3

=== Doubles ===
- (Hong Kong) Eudice Chong / (Hong Kong) Cody Wong Hong-yi def. (Hungary) Tímea Babos / Valeria Savinykh, 7–5, 5–7, [13–11]
