= 2022 Tuks International – Singles =

Singles
- 2022 Tuks International

Final
- Champion: Anastasia Tikhonova
- Runner-up: (Israel) Lina Glushko
- Score: 5–7, 6–3, 6–3

Events
Singles	Doubles
- Tuks International

Zoë Kruger was the defending champion but lost in the first round to Tímea Babos.

Anastasia Tikhonova won the title, defeating Lina Glushko in the final, 5–7, 6–3, 6–3.

== Seeds ==
1. (France) Tessah Andrianjafitrimo (quarterfinals)
2. Valeria Savinykh (quarterfinals)
3. (United Kingdom) Jodie Burrage (second round)
4. (Netherlands) Richèl Hogenkamp (quarterfinals)
5. (United Kingdom) Katie Swan (first round)
6. Anastasia Tikhonova (champion)
7. (Switzerland) Joanne Züger (semifinals, retired)
8. (United Kingdom) Yuriko Miyazaki (semifinals)

== Draw ==
Key

- Q = Qualifier
- WC = Wild card
- LL = Lucky loser
- Alt = Alternate
- ITF = ITF entry
- PR = Protected ranking
- SR = Special ranking
- SE = Special exempt
- JE = Junior exempt
- JR = Junior Accelerator Programme entrant
- CO = College Accelerator Programme entrant
- NG = Next Gen Accelerator Program entrant
- w/o = Walkover
- r = Retired
- d = Defaulted

=== Finals ===
Semifinals
8	(United Kingdom) Yuriko Miyazaki	6	4	3
(Israel) Lina Glushko	3	6	6
6	Anastasia Tikhonova	6	1
7	(Switzerland) Joanne Züger	3	0^{r}

Final
(Israel) Lina Glushko	7	3	3
6	Anastasia Tikhonova	5	6	6

=== Top half ===
First round
1	(France) T Andrianjafitrimo	6	2
Q	(Serbia) T Čurović	2	0^{r}
Q	(Hungary) A Nagy	3	6	2
Q	(Hong Kong) E Chong	6	2	6
WC	(South Africa) Z Kruger	4	2
(Hungary) T Babos	6	6
Q	(Hong Kong) C Wong H-y	4	6	5
8	(United Kingdom) Y Miyazaki	6	1	7
3	(United Kingdom) J Burrage	6	6
PR	(Germany) K Hobgarski	3	1
WC	(South Africa) R Sereo	0	1
(France) C Monnet	6	6
(Slovakia) V Morvayová	3	6^{5}
Q	(Egypt) S Samir	6	7^{7}
(Israel) L Glushko	6	6
5	(United Kingdom) K Swan	3	3

Second round
1	(France) T Andrianjafitrimo	6	3	6
Q	(Hong Kong) E Chong	3	6	2
(Hungary) T Babos	1	5
8	(United Kingdom) Y Miyazaki	6	7
3	(United Kingdom) J Burrage	6	2	5
(France) C Monnet	4	6	7
Q	(Egypt) S Samir
(Israel) L Glushko	w/o

Quarterfinals
1	(France) T Andrianjafitrimo	3	0
8	(United Kingdom) Y Miyazaki	6	6
(France) C Monnet	3	1
(Israel) L Glushko	6	6

Semifinals
8	(United Kingdom) Y Miyazaki	6	4	3
(Israel) L Glushko	3	6	6

=== Bottom half ===
First round
6	A Tikhonova	6	7^{7}
(France) A Robbe	4	6^{2}
(Poland) U Radwańska	2	6	5
WC	(South Africa) I Kruger	6	1	7
WC	(South Africa) T Wilmot	2	1
E Reyngold	6	6
E Kazionova	4	4
4	(Netherlands) R Hogenkamp	6	6
7	(Switzerland) J Züger	6	6
(Czech Republic) S Bejlek	3	3
I Khromacheva	6	6
(Ukraine) V Strakhova	1	4
(Poland) M Chwalińska	3	6	6
Q	(Germany) A Gabric	6	2	1
(United Kingdom) M Mutavdzic	2	0
2	V Savinykh	6	6

Second round
6	A Tikhonova	6	6
WC	(South Africa) I Kruger	4	3
E Reyngold	4	6	1
4	(Netherlands) R Hogenkamp	6	4	6
7	(Switzerland) J Züger	7^{7}	6
I Khromacheva	6^{4}	2
(Poland) M Chwalińska	3	6^{5}
2	V Savinykh	6	7^{7}

Quarterfinals
6	A Tikhonova	6	6
4	(Netherlands) R Hogenkamp	2	3
7	(Switzerland) J Züger	6	2	6
2	V Savinykh	2	6	3

Semifinals
6	A Tikhonova	6	1
7	(Switzerland) J Züger	3	0^{r}
