= Wiphold International =

- 2023 Wiphold International

ITF Women's Tour
- Event name: Tuks International (2019–22); Wiphold International (2023–)
- Location: Pretoria, South Africa
- Venue: University of Pretoria
- Category: ITF Women's World Tennis Tour
- Surface: Hard
- Draw: 32S/48Q/16D
- Prize money: $40,000
- Website: www.tennissa.co.za

The Wiphold International are two back-to-back tournaments for professional female tennis players played on outdoor hardcourts. The events are classified as $40,000 ITF Women's Circuit tournaments and have been held in Pretoria, South Africa, since 2019.

== Past finals ==
=== Singles ===
Year	Champion	Runner-up	Score
2026 (2)	Ksenia Smirnova	(Germany) Franziska Sziedat	6–3 ret.
2026 (1)	(China) Mi Lan	Ksenia Smirnova	6–0, 6–2
2025 (2)	(Netherlands) Stéphanie Visscher	(Switzerland) Jenny Dürst	5–7, 6–1, 7–6^{(7–5)}
2025 (1)	(Switzerland) Jenny Dürst	(Netherlands) Stéphanie Visscher	6–1, 6–3
2024 (2)	(Brazil) Laura Pigossi	(Belgium) Hanne Vandewinkel	6–2, 4–6, 7–5
2024 (1)	(Israel) Lina Glushko	(France) Manon Léonard	6–3, 7–5
2023 (2)	Alina Korneeva	(Hungary) Tímea Babos	6–3, 7–6^{(7–3)}
2023 (1)	(United States) Emina Bektas	(Israel) Lina Glushko	3–6, 6–3, 7–6^{(8–6)}
2022 (2)	Tournament abandoned due to poor weather		
2022 (1)	Anastasia Tikhonova	(Israel) Lina Glushko	5–7, 6–3, 6–3
2021	(South Africa) Zoë Kruger	(Netherlands) Suzan Lamens	3–6, 6–4, 6–4
2020	Tournaments cancelled due to the coronavirus pandemic		
2019	(Netherlands) Merel Hoedt	(Austria) Yvonne Neuwirth	6–2, 6–1

=== Doubles ===
Year	Champions	Runners-up	Score
2026 (2)	Tournament abandoned due to poor weather		
2026 (1)	(United States) Ava Hrastar (United States) Victoria Mulville	(Germany) Franziska Sziedat (Germany) Angelina Wirges	6–1, 6–4
2025 (2)	(Netherlands) Coco Bosman (Italy) Maddalena Giordano	(Germany) Vivien Sandberg (Netherlands) Emma van Poppel	Walkover
2025 (1)	(Netherlands) Rikke de Koning (Netherlands) Stéphanie Visscher	Arina Arifullina; Polina Kaibekova	7–6^{(7–4)}, 6–3
2024 (2)	Alina Charaeva; Ekaterina Reyngold	(South Africa) Isabella Kruger (South Africa) Zoë Kruger	6–0, 5–7, [10–3]
2024 (1)	(Israel) Lina Glushko (Czech Republic) Gabriela Knutson	(Belgium) Sofia Costoulas (Belgium) Hanne Vandewinkel	7–6^{(7–5)}, 7–6^{(7–4)}
2023 (1)	(Japan) Mai Hontama (France) Alice Tubello	(Belgium) Sofia Costoulas (Italy) Dalila Spiteri	6–3, 6–3
2023 (1)	(United States) Emina Bektas (Israel) Lina Glushko	(Hungary) Tímea Babos (Spain) Georgina García Pérez	6–3, 4–6, [13–11]
2022 (2)	Tournament abandoned due to poor weather		
2022 (1)	(Hong Kong) Eudice Chong (Hong Kong) Cody Wong	(Hungary) Tímea Babos; Valeria Savinykh	7–5, 5–7, [13–11]
2021	(Russia) Amina Anshba (United States) Elizabeth Mandlik	(Switzerland) Jenny Dürst (Switzerland) Nina Stadler	6–2, 6–2
2020	Tournaments cancelled due to the coronavirus pandemic		
2019	(France) Caroline Roméo (South Africa) Chanel Simmonds	(India) Zeel Desai (Netherlands) Merel Hoedt	walkover
