= 2022 Tuks International – Doubles =

Doubles
- 2022 Tuks International

Final
- Champions: (Hong Kong) Eudice Chong (Hong Kong) Cody Wong Hong-yi
- Runners-up: (Hungary) Tímea Babos; Valeria Savinykh
- Score: 7–5, 5–7, [13–11]

Events
Singles	Doubles
- Tuks International

Amina Anshba and Elizabeth Mandlik were the defending champions but chose not to participate.

Eudice Chong and Cody Wong Hong-yi won the title, defeating Tímea Babos and Valeria Savinykh in the final, 7–5, 5–7, [13–11].

== Seeds ==
1. (Hungary) Tímea Babos / Valeria Savinykh (final)
2. (Poland) Maja Chwalińska / (Ukraine) Valeriya Strakhova (first round)
3. (Hong Kong) Eudice Chong / (Hong Kong) Cody Wong Hong-yi (champions)
4. (Hungary) Adrienn Nagy / Anastasia Tikhonova (semifinals)

== Draw ==
Key

- Q = Qualifier
- WC = Wild card
- LL = Lucky loser
- Alt = Alternate
- ITF = ITF entry
- PR = Protected ranking
- SR = Special ranking
- SE = Special exempt
- JE = Junior exempt
- JR = Junior Accelerator Programme entrant
- CO = College Accelerator Programme entrant
- NG = Next Gen Accelerator Program entrant
- w/o = Walkover
- r = Retired
- d = Defaulted

=== Draw ===
First round
1	(Hungary) T Babos; V Savinykh	7^{7}	6
(Czech Republic) S Bejlek (United Kingdom) Y Miyazaki	6^{4}	3
(United States) A Rogers (United States) C Rosca	3	6	[11]
(Serbia) T Čurović (Czech Republic) A Laboutková	6	3	[9]
4	(Hungary) A Nagy; A Tikhonova	6	6
WC	(South Africa) C Jaramba (South Africa) TT Panaino	1	2
(Germany) A Gabric (Germany) K Hobgarski	3	2
I Khromacheva (United Kingdom) K Swan	6	6
(Israel) L Glushko (Israel) N Khirin	3	6	[11]
(France) C Monnet (France) A Robbe	6	1	[9]
WC	(South Africa) I Lamprecht (South Africa) K Yelverton	2	1
3	(Hong Kong) E Chong (Hong Kong) C Wong H-y	6	6
WC	(South Africa) I Kruger (South Africa) Z Kruger	4	7	[10]
E Kazionova; E Reyngold	6	5	[7]
(Japan) M Ayukawa (Switzerland) J Züger	6	6
2	(Poland) M Chwalińska (Ukraine) V Strakhova	0	4

Quarterfinals
1	(Hungary) T Babos; V Savinykh	6	6
(United States) A Rogers (United States) C Rosca	3	3
4	(Hungary) A Nagy; A Tikhonova	w/o
I Khromacheva (United Kingdom) K Swan
(Israel) L Glushko (Israel) N Khirin	2	2
3	(Hong Kong) E Chong (Hong Kong) C Wong H-y	6	6
WC	(South Africa) I Kruger (South Africa) Z Kruger	6	4	[3]
(Japan) M Ayukawa (Switzerland) J Züger	3	6	[10]

Semifinals
1	(Hungary) T Babos; V Savinykh	6	6
4	(Hungary) A Nagy; A Tikhonova	4	2
3	(Hong Kong) E Chong (Hong Kong) C Wong H-y	2	6	[10]
(Japan) M Ayukawa (Switzerland) J Züger	6	3	[5]

Final
1	(Hungary) T Babos; V Savinykh	5	7	[11]
3	(Hong Kong) E Chong (Hong Kong) C Wong H-y	7	5	[13]
