= Zed Tennis Open =

- 2020 Zed Tennis Open

ITF Women's Tour
- Event name: Zed Tennis Open
- Location: Cairo, Egypt
- Venue: Zed Club
- Category: ITF Women's Circuit
- Surface: Hard
- Draw: 32S/32Q/16D
- Prize money: $100,000 / $60,000

The Zed Tennis Open were a series of tournaments for professional female tennis players played on outdoor hardcourts. The events, classified as $100,000 and $60,000 ITF Women's Circuit tournaments, had been held in Cairo, Egypt, in 2020.

== Past finals ==
=== Singles ===
Year	Champion	Runner-up	Score
2020 (3)	Tournament cancelled due to the COVID-19 pandemic		
2020 (2)	(Ukraine) Marta Kostyuk	(Spain) Aliona Bolsova	6–1, 6–0
2020 (1)	(Romania) Irina-Camelia Begu	(Ukraine) Lesia Tsurenko	6–4, 3–6, 6–2

=== Doubles ===
Year	Champions	Runners-up	Score
2020 (3)	Tournament cancelled due to the COVID-19 pandemic		
2020 (2)	(Ukraine) Marta Kostyuk (Russia) Kamilla Rakhimova	(Poland) Paula Kania (Ukraine) Anastasiya Shoshyna	6–3, 2–6, [10–6]
2020 (1)	(Serbia) Aleksandra Krunić (Poland) Katarzyna Piter	(Netherlands) Arantxa Rus (Egypt) Mayar Sherif	6–4, 6–2
