= Stefania Rubini =

Italian tennis player

- Country (sports): Italy
- Born: 5 December 1992 (age 33)
- Prize money: $99,802

Singles
- Career record: 240–225
- Career titles: 7 ITF
- Highest ranking: No. 293 (15 October 2018)

Doubles
- Career record: 27–40
- Highest ranking: No. 772 (1 October 2012)

Stefania Rubini (born 5 December 1992) is an inactive Italian tennis player.

She has career-high WTA rankings of 293 in singles, achieved on 15 October 2018, and 772 in doubles, set on 1 October 2012.

Rubini made her WTA Tour main-draw debut at the 2017 Italian Open in the doubles tournament, partnering with Deborah Chiesa; they lost their first-round match against Jelena Janković and Andrea Petkovic.

Rubini won her first ITF title in 2015 in Velenje, Slovenia.

== ITF Circuit finals ==
=== Singles: 12 (7 titles, 5 runner-ups) ===
| Legend $25,000 tournaments $10/15,000 tournaments | Finals by surface Clay (4–4) Carpet (3–1) |

| Result | W–L | Date | Tournament | Tier | Surface | Opponent | Score |
|---|---|---|---|---|---|---|---|
| Loss | 0–1 | Nov 2014 | ITF Pula, Italy | 10,000 | Clay | (Italy) Martina Caregaro | 4–6, 4–6 |
| Loss | 0–2 | Apr 2015 | ITF Pula, Italy | 10,000 | Clay | (Romania) Irina Bara | 1–6, 5–7 |
| Win | 1–2 | May 2015 | ITF Velenje, Slovenia | 10,000 | Clay | (Slovenia) Eva Zagorac | 4–6, 7–5, 6–2 |
| Loss | 1–3 | Nov 2015 | ITF Casablanca, Morocco | 10,000 | Clay | (Slovenia) Pia Cuk | 4–6, ret. |
| Win | 2–3 | Jun 2017 | ITF Sassuolo, Italy | 15,000 | Clay | (Italy) Federica Bilardo | 5–7, 6–0, 6–4 |
| Loss | 2–4 | Jul 2017 | ITF Imola, Italy | 25,000 | Carpet | (Slovakia) Viktória Kužmová | 3–6, 3–6 |
| Win | 3–4 | Jul 2017 | ITF Schio, Italy | 15,000 | Clay | (Italy) Anastasia Grymalska | 6–7^{(4)}, 6–3, 6–4 |
| Win | 4–4 | Mar 2018 | ITF Solarino, Italy | 15,000 | Carpet | (Belarus) Sviatlana Pirazhenka | 6–4, 6–2 |
| Loss | 4–5 | May 2018 | ITF Caserta, Italy | 25,000 | Clay | (Belgium) Kimberley Zimmermann | 6–1, 5–7, 1–6 |
| Win | 5–5 | Jul 2018 | ITF Imola, Italy | 25,000 | Carpet | (France) Sherazad Reix | 2–0 ret. |
| Win | 6–5 | Jul 2019 | ITF Imola, Italy | 25,000 | Carpet | (Italy) Claudia Giovine | 6–3, 6–3 |
| Win | 7–5 | Aug 2019 | ITF Sezze, Italy | 25,000 | Clay | (Kazakhstan) Anna Danilina | 6–1, 6–4 |

=== Doubles: 2 (runner-ups) ===
| Legend $10,000 tournaments | Finals by surface Clay (0–2) |

| Result | W–L | Date | Tournament | Tier | Surface | Partner | Opponents | Score |
|---|---|---|---|---|---|---|---|---|
| Loss | 0–1 | Oct 2011 | ITF Plovdiv, Bulgaria | 10,000 | Clay | (Switzerland) Clelia Melena | (Germany) Dinah Pfizenmaier (Germany) Julia Wachaczyk | 4–6, 5–7 |
| Loss | 0–2 | Sep 2014 | ITF Pula, Italy | 10,000 | Clay | (Italy) Cristiana Ferrando | (Italy) Alice Balducci (Italy) Angelica Moratelli | 1–6, 4–6 |
