= Anastasiya Shoshyna =

Ukrainian tennis player

Anastasiya Shoshyna Анастасія Шошина
- Full name: Anastasiya Mykolayivna Shoshyna
- Country (sports): Poland (2020–); Ukraine (2012–20)
- Born: 30 November 1997 (age 28) Kharkiv, Ukraine
- Plays: Right (two-handed backhand)
- Prize money: $56,375

Singles
- Career record: 160–92
- Career titles: 5 ITF
- Highest ranking: No. 381 (19 August 2019)

Doubles
- Career record: 88–48
- Career titles: 10 ITF
- Highest ranking: No. 279 (2 March 2020)

Anastasiya Mykolayivna Shoshyna (Ukrainian: Анастасія Миколаївна Шошина; Polish: Anastasija Szoszyna; born 30 November 1997) is a Polish former professional tennis player.

Shoshyna won five singles and ten doubles titles on the ITF Circuit. She has career-high WTA rankings of 381 in singles and 279 in doubles, reached on 19 August 2019 and on 2 March 2020, respectively.

Shoshyna made her WTA Tour singles main-draw debut at the 2016 Katowice Open, after receiving a wildcard for the tournament.

In June 2022, Shoshyna was issued with a four-year ban backdated to October 2020 for an anti-doping rule violation after testing positive for stanozolol at a tournament in Istanbul, Turkey.

== ITF Circuit finals ==
=== Singles: 8 (5 titles, 3 runner–ups) ===
Legend $25,000 tournaments $10/15,000 tournaments	Finals by surface Hard (1–1) Clay (4–2)

Result	W–L	Date	Tournament	Tier	Surface	Opponent	Score
Loss	0–1	Aug 2015	ITF Las Palmas, Spain	10,000	Clay	(Spain) Marta González Encinas	4–6, 6–2, 6–7^{(3)}
Loss	0–2	Nov 2015	ITF Stockholm, Sweden	10,000	Hard (i)	(France) Julie Gervais	1–6, 4–6
Loss	0–3	May 2016	ITF Győr, Hungary	10,000	Clay	(Serbia) Vesna Dolonc	3–6, 5–7
Win	1–3	Jun 2016	ITF Szczawno-Zdrój, Poland	10,000	Clay	(Belgium) Hélène Scholsen	6–3, 4–6, 6–4
Win	2–3	Sep 2018	ITF Chornomorsk, Ukraine	15,000	Clay	(Serbia) Bojana Marinković	6–4, 6–1
Win	3–3	Oct 2018	ITF Chornomorsk	15,000	Clay	(Ukraine) Liubov Kostenko	6–3, 6–3
Win	4–3	Nov 2018	ITF Sharm El Sheik, Egypt	15,000	Hard	(Russia) Anna Morgina	7–5, 7–5
Win	5–3	Dec 2018	ITF Cairo, Egypt	15,000	Clay	(Egypt) Sandra Samir	6–4, 1–6, 6–4

=== Doubles: 16 (10 titles, 6 runner–ups) ===
Legend $50/60,000 tournaments $25,000 tournaments $15,000 tournaments $10,000 tournaments	Finals by surface Hard (4–1) Clay (6–5)

Outcome	No.	Date	Tournament	Surface	Partner	Opponents	Score
Winner	1	10 August 2015	ITF Las Palmas, Spain	Clay	(Poland) Olga Brózda	(Netherlands) Chayenne Ewijk (Netherlands) Rosalie van der Hoek	7–6^{(8)}, 3–6, [10–7]
Winner	2	2 November 2015	ITF Stockholm, Sweden	Hard (i)	(Poland) Olga Brózda	(Italy) Deborah Chiesa (Estonia) Valeria Gorlats	6–3, 6–2
Winner	3	21 March 2016	ITF Sharm El Sheikh, Egypt	Hard	(Ukraine) Veronika Kapshay	(Switzerland) Karin Kennel (Greece) Despina Papamichail	6–1, 6–2
Winner	4	4 June 2016	ITF Szczawno-Zdrój, Poland	Clay	(Poland) Olga Brózda	(Ukraine) Maryna Kolb (Ukraine) Nadiya Kolb	6–2, 7–6^{(4)}
Runner-up	1	11 July 2016	ITS Cup, Czech Republic	Clay	(Philippines) Katharina Lehnert	(Bosnia and Herzegovina) Ema Burgić Bucko (Bosnia and Herzegovina) Jasmina Tinjić	5–7, 3–6
Winner	5	21 August 2016	ITF Kharkiv, Ukraine	Clay	(Ukraine) Veronika Kapshay	(Belarus) Ilona Kremen (Ukraine) Ganna Poznikhirenko	4–6, 6–4, [11–9]
Runner-up	2	10 September 2016	ITF Bucha, Ukraine	Clay	(Ukraine) Veronika Kapshay	(Belarus) Ilona Kremen (Ukraine) Ganna Poznikhirenko	3–6, 2–6
Winner	6	6 November 2016	ITF Stockholm, Sweden	Hard (i)	(Sweden) Cornelia Lister	(Sweden) Hilda Melander (Sweden) Paulina Milosavljevic	7–6^{(3)}, 6–2
Winner	7	4 December 2016	ITF Antalya, Turkey	Clay	(Hungary) Ágnes Bukta	(Bulgaria) Ani Vangelova (United States) Caitlyn Williams	6–2, 4–6, [10–7]
Runner-up	3	18 August 2017	ITF Mrągowo, Poland	Clay	(United Kingdom) Maia Lumsden	(Italy) Angelica Moratelli (France) Jade Suvrijn	4–6, 4–6
Winner	8	7 October 2018	ITF Chornomorsk, Ukraine	Clay	(Poland) Weronika Falkowska	(Belarus) Anastasiya Komar (Ukraine) Liubow Kostenko	6–2, 6–1
Winner	9	10 November 2018	ITF Sharm El Sheik	Hard	(Russia) Anna Morgina	(Romania) Elena-Teodora Cadar (Bosnia and Herzegovina) Jelena Simić	7–5, 7–5
Runner-up	4	8 December 2018	ITF Cairo, Egypt	Clay	(Egypt) Sandra Samir	(Japan) Minami Akiyama (Ukraine) Viktoriia Dema	2–6, 7–6^{(2)}, [6–10]
Winner	10	4 August 2019	ITF Grodzisk Mazowiecki, Poland	Clay	(Poland) Anna Hertel	(Norway) Ulrikke Eikeri (Bulgaria) Isabella Shinikova	6–7^{(6)}, 6–2, [10–4]
Runner-up	5	1 September 2019	ITF Prague, Czech Republic	Clay	(Poland) Katarzyna Piter	(Netherlands) Suzan Lamens (Russia) Marina Melnikova	2–6, 7–5, [8–10]
Runner-up	6	23 February 2020	Zed Tennis Open, Egypt	Hard	(Poland) Paula Kania	(Ukraine) Marta Kostyuk (Russia) Kamilla Rakhimova	3–6, 6–2, [6–10]
