= Lamis Alhussein Abdel Aziz =

Egyptian tennis player (born 1998)

- Country (sports): Egypt
- Born: 24 April 1998 (age 28)
- Prize money: $131,236

Singles
- Career record: 351–199
- Career titles: 11 ITF
- Highest ranking: No. 365 (8 June 2026)
- Current ranking: No. 420 (9 November 2026)

Doubles
- Career record: 152–140
- Career titles: 10 ITF
- Highest ranking: No. 407 (2 November 2026)
- Current ranking: No. 417 (9 November 2026)

Team competitions
- Fed Cup: 11–16
- Last updated on: 9 November 2026.

Lamis Alhussein Abdel Aziz (born 24 April 1998) is an Egyptian tennis player. She has career-high WTA rankings of 365 in singles, achieved on 8 June 2026, and 407 in doubles reached in November 2026.

Alhussein Abdel Aziz has won eleven singles titles and ten doubles titles on the ITF Women's World Tennis Tour.

Playing for Egypt in the Billie Jean King Cup, she has a win–loss record of 11–16 (as of October 2026).

== ITF Circuit finals ==
=== Singles: 27 (12 titles, 15 runner-ups) ===
Legend W35 tournaments W15 tournaments (12–15)	Finals by surface Hard (11–12) Clay (1–3)

Result	W–L	Date	Tournament	Tier	Surface	Opponent	Score
Loss	0–1	Sep 2018	ITF Cairo, Egypt	W15	Clay	(Ecuador) Charlotte Römer	3–6, 4–6
Loss	0–2	Oct 2018	ITF Sharm El Sheikh, Egypt	W15	Hard	(Sweden) Jacqueline Cabaj Awad	5–7, 3–6
Loss	0–3	Dec 2019	ITF Cairo, Egypt	W15	Clay	(Italy) Marion Viertler	1–6, 4–6
Win	1–3	Sep 2021	ITF Cairo, Egypt	W15	Clay	(Bulgaria) Julia Stamatova	3–6, 6–2, 6–2
Loss	1–4	Oct 2021	ITF Cairo, Egypt	W15	Clay	(Russia) Anastasia Zolotareva	2–6, 6–3, 2–6
Win	2–4	Dec 2021	ITF Giza, Egypt	W15	Hard	(Russia) Tatiana Barkova	6–4, 7–5
Loss	2–5	Dec 2022	ITF Sharm El Sheikh, Egypt	W15	Hard	(United Kingdom) Katy Dunne	2–6, 2–6
Win	3–5	May 2023	ITF Monastir, Tunisia	W15	Hard	(Italy) Martina Spigarelli	7–5, 6–3
Win	4–5	Jul 2023	ITF Monastir, Tunisia	W15	Hard	(Spain) Lucía Llinares Domingo	6–4, 6–0
Loss	4–6	Jul 2023	ITF Monastir, Tunisia	W15	Hard	(Italy) Camilla Zanolini	6–4, 4–6, 2–6
Win	5–6	Aug 2023	ITF Monastir, Tunisia	W15	Hard	(France) Marie Villet	7–6^{(2)}, 0–6, 6–3
Win	6–6	Sep 2023	ITF Monastir, Tunisia	W15	Hard	(Italy) Lara Pfeifer	5–7, 6–4, 6–0
Loss	6–7	Oct 2023	ITF Sharm El Sheikh, Egypt	W15	Hard	(Latvia) Kamilla Bartone	5–7, 6–2, 5–7
Loss	6–8	Jun 2024	ITF Monastir, Tunisia	W15	Hard	Anastasia Gasanova	2–6, 4–6
Loss	6–9	Jul 2024	ITF Monastir, Tunisia	W15	Hard	(Kosovo) Arlinda Rushiti	4–6, 6–2, 6–7^{(2)}
Loss	6–10	Aug 2024	ITF Monastir, Tunisia	W15	Hard	(Spain) Ariana Geerlings	4–6, 1–6
Win	7–10	Sep 2024	ITF Sharm El Sheikh, Egypt	W15	Hard	(Egypt) Sandra Samir	6–3, 6–3
Loss	7–11	Jun 2025	ITF Monastir, Tunisia	W15	Hard	(Lithuania) Patricija Paukštytė	0–6, 7–5, 3–6
Win	8–11	Jun 2025	ITF Monastir, Tunisia	W15	Hard	(Austria) Arabella Koller	6–1, 6–7^{(5)}, 2–0 ret.
Loss	8–12	Sep 2025	ITF Hurghada, Egypt	W15	Hard	Daria Khomutsianskaya	3–6, 3–6
Win	9–12	Oct 2025	ITF Sharm El Sheikh, Egypt	W15	Hard	Victoria Milovanova	6–2, 6–4
Loss	9–13	Nov 2025	ITF Sharm El Sheikh	W15	Hard	(Egypt) Sandra Samir	6–4, 3–6, 5–7
Loss	9–14	Nov 2025	ITF Sharm El Sheikh	W15	Hard	(Egypt) Sandra Samir	6–2, 6–7^{(3)}, 6–7^{(3)}
Win	10–14	Jan 2026	ITF Sharm El Sheikh	W15	Hard	(Egypt) Sandra Samir	7–5, 4–6, 7–6^{(3)}
Win	11–14	Apr 2026	ITF Sharm El Sheikh	W15	Hard	(Netherlands) Stéphanie Visscher	6–7^{(3)}, 6–3, 6–1
Loss	11–15	Oct 2026	ITF Sharm El Sheikh	W15	Hard	Yuliya Perapekhina	0–6, 6–3, 2–6
Win	12–15	Nov 2026	ITF Sharm El Sheikh	W15	Hard	Anna Snigireva	7–5, 6–4

=== Doubles: 19 (10 titles, 9 runner-ups) ===
Legend W25/35 tournaments (1–2) W15 tournaments (9–7)	Finals by surface Hard (8–7) Clay (2–2)

Result	W–L	Date	Tournament	Tier	Surface	Partner	Opponents	Score
Win	1–0	May 2018	ITF Cairo, Egypt	W15	Clay	(Canada) Maria Patrascu	(Egypt) Ola Abou Zekry (Egypt) Sandra Samir	4–6, 6–3, [11–9]
Loss	1–1	Sep 2018	ITF Cairo, Egypt	W15	Clay	(Egypt) Farah Abdel-Wahab	(United States) Joelle Kissell (Ecuador) Charlotte Römer	6–7^{(3)}, 2–6
Win	2–1	Sep 2019	ITF Cairo, Egypt	W15	Clay	(Russia) Anastasia Zolotareva	(Serbia) Bojana Marinković (Egypt) Sandra Samir	7–5, 2–6, [10–3]
Loss	2–2	Nov 2019	ITF Monastir, Tunisia	W15	Hard	(Gabon) Célestine Avomo Ella	(Italy) Angelica Raggi (France) Carla Touly	6–3, 4–6, [7–10]
Loss	2–3	Nov 2019	ITF Monastir, Tunisia	W15	Hard	(Gabon) Célestine Avomo Ella	(Venezuela) Nadia Echeverría Alam (Lithuania) Justina Mikulskytė	6–7^{(6)}, 6–7^{(2)}
Loss	2–4	May 2023	ITF Monastir, Tunisia	W25	Hard	(India) Sharmada Balu	(United Kingdom) Lauryn John-Baptiste (France) Yasmine Mansouri	3–6, 1–6
Loss	2–5	Jun 2024	ITF Monastir, Tunisia	W15	Hard	(Egypt) Merna Refaat	(United States) Julia Adams (Canada) Leena Bennetto	6–4, 5–7, [4–10]
Win	3–5	Jul 2024	ITF Monastir, Tunisia	W15	Hard	Aglaya Fedorova	(Romania) Alexandra Iordache (Estonia) Liisa Varul	6–3, 3–6, [10–5]
Loss	3–6	Jul 2024	ITF Monastir, Tunisia	W15	Hard	(Kosovo) Arlinda Rushiti	(Japan) Nanari Katsumi (Japan) Haine Ogata	3–6, 6–1, [6–10]
Loss	3–7	May 2025	ITF Monastir, Tunisia	W15	Hard	(Ukraine) Kateryna Lazarenko	(United States) Annika Penickova (United States) Kristina Penickova	5–7, 2–6
Loss	3–8	Jun 2025	ITF Monastir, Tunisia	W15	Hard	(Germany) Anja Wildgruber	(France) Astrid Cirotte (Lithuania) Patricija Paukštytė	4–6, 1–6
Win	4–8	Jun 2025	ITF Monastir, Tunisia	W15	Hard	(Egypt) Merna Refaat	(Lithuania) Patricija Paukštytė (New Zealand) Elyse Tse	6–4, 3–6, [10–7]
Win	5–8	Sep 2025	ITF Hurghada, Egypt	W15	Hard	(Germany) Anja Wildgruber	Daria Khomutsianskaya; Anna Kubareva	6–3, 7–6^{(5)}
Win	6–8	Jan 2026	ITF Sharm El Sheikh	W15	Hard	(China) Ren Yufei	(China) Chen Mengyi (China) Wang Meiling	7–6^{(4)}, 6–2
Win	7–8	Feb 2026	ITF Sharm El Sheikh	W15	Hard	(China) Ren Yufei	(China) Liu Yuhan (China) Wang Meiling	4–6, 7–6^{(3)}, [10–5]
Win	8–8	May 2026	ITF Hurghada, Egypt	W15	Hard	(Ukraine) Kateryna Lazarenko	(Denmark) Sarafina Olivia Hansen (Turkey) Doğa Türkmen	6–2, 6–2
Win	9–8	May 2026	ITF Hurghada, Egypt	W35	Hard	(Italy) Camilla Zanolini	Ekaterina Maklakova; Elina Nepliy	1–6, 6–3, [11–9]
Loss	9–9	Jul 2026	ITF Buzău, Romania	W35	Clay	(Bulgaria) Iva Ivanova	(Romania) Alesia Breaz (Romania) Cristiana Nicoleta Todoni	6–1, 5–7, [1–10]
Win	10–9	Oct 2026	ITF Sharm El Sheikh, Egypt	W15	Hard	(Egypt) Sandra Samir	(Croatia) Karla Popović (Bulgaria) Isabella Shinikova	6–1, 7–6^{(4)}
