= Sandra Samir =

Egyptian tennis player (born 1997)

Sandra Samir ساندرا سمير
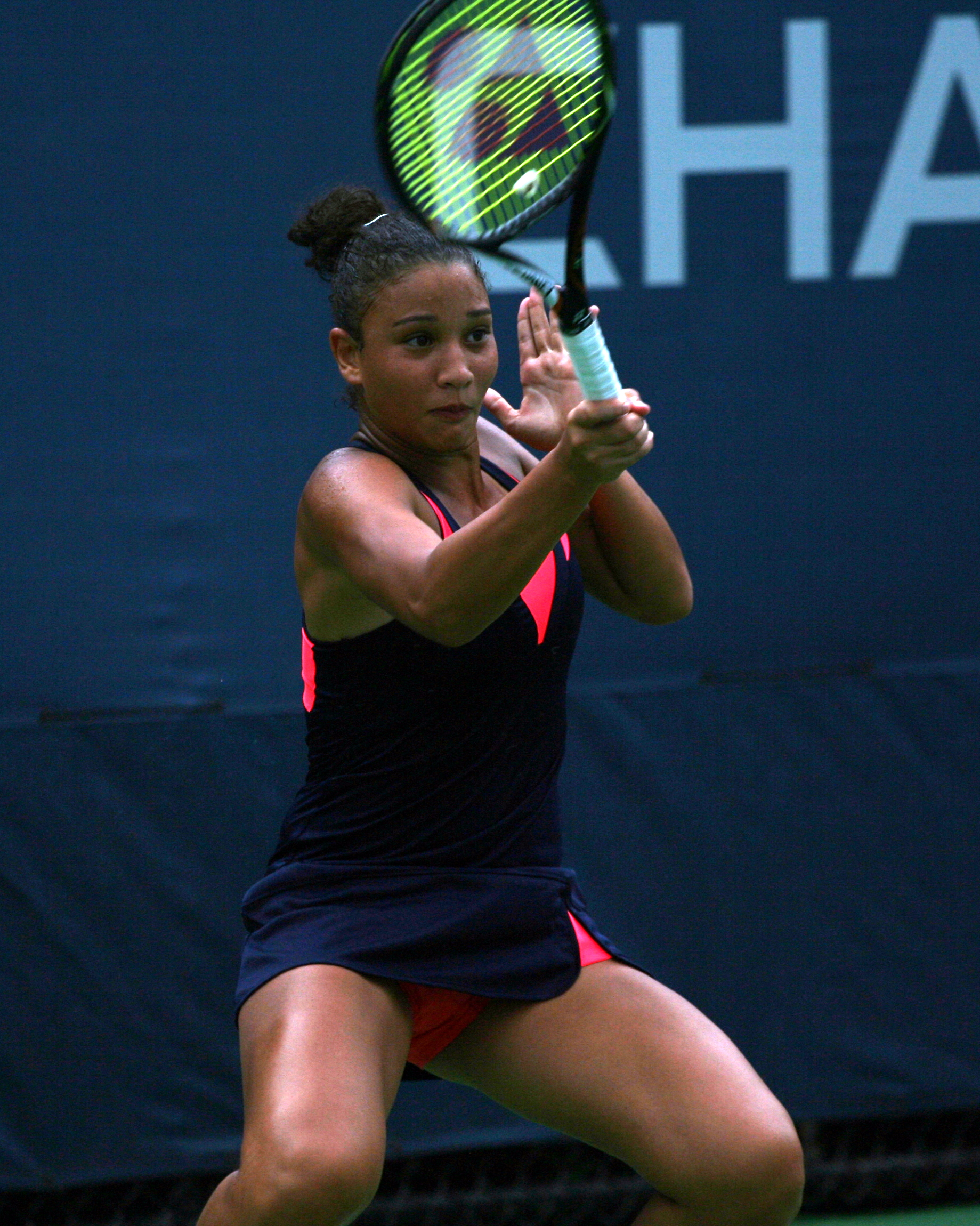
- Samir at the 2013 US Open
- Full name: Sandra Sameh Samir Abdul Salam
- Country (sports): Egypt
- Born: 4 November 1997 (age 29) Giza, Egypt
- Height: 1.70 m (5 ft 7 in)
- Plays: Right (two-handed backhand)
- Coach: Karim Mahmoud
- Prize money: $229,381

Singles
- Career record: 549–312
- Career titles: 20 ITF
- Highest ranking: No. 342 (26 October 2020)
- Current ranking: No. 403 (9 November 2026)

Doubles
- Career record: 287–231
- Career titles: 20 ITF
- Highest ranking: No. 322 (24 July 2023)
- Current ranking: No. 365 (9 November 2026)

Team competitions
- Fed Cup: 27–32
Medal record
Representing Egypt
African Games
Gold medal – first place	2015 Brazzaville	Tennis
- Last updated on: 9 November 2026.

Sandra Sameh Samir Abdul Salam (Arabic: ساندرا سامح سمير عبدالسلام; born 4 November 1997) is an Egyptian professional tennis player. She reached her best singles ranking of world No. 342 on 26 October 2020. On 24 July 2023, she peaked at No. 322 in the doubles rankings.

She has won 20 singles and 20 doubles titles on the ITF Women's Circuit.

Playing for the Egypt in the BJK Cup, Samir has a win–loss record of 27–32 (singles: 21–23) as of October 2026.

== Career ==
In 2013, Samir won the U-16 African Junior Tennis Championships.

== ITF Circuit finals ==
=== Singles: 45 (20 titles, 25 runner-ups) ===
Legend W25 tournaments W10/15 tournaments	Finals by surface Hard (11–13) Clay (9–12)

Result	W–L	Date	Tournament	Tier	Surface	Opponent	Score
Loss	0–1	Jan 2015	ITF Port El Kantaoui, Tunisia	W10	Hard	(Bulgaria) Isabella Shinikova	2–6, 6–3, 3–6
Loss	0–2	Jun 2015	ITF Sharm El Sheikh, Egypt	W10	Hard	(Spain) Nuria Párrizas Díaz	1–6, 3–6
Win	1–2	Aug 2015	ITF Sharm El Sheikh	W10	Hard	(France) Victoria Muntean	6–1, 6–2
Loss	1–3	Jan 2016	ITF Cairo, Egypt	W10	Clay	(Slovakia) Chantal Škamlová	1–6, 6–4, 6–7^{(3)}
Loss	1–4	Jan 2016	ITF Cairo, Egypt	W10	Clay	(Slovakia) Chantal Škamlová	4–6, 1–6
Loss	1–5	Feb 2016	ITF Hammamet, Tunisia	W10	Clay	(France) Victoria Larrière	1–6, 4–6
Loss	1–6	May 2016	ITF Hammamet, Tunisia	W10	Clay	(Switzerland) Lisa Sabino	6–4, 5–7, 4–6
Loss	1–7	Oct 2016	ITF Sharm El Sheikh, Egypt	W10	Hard	(Germany) Sarah-Rebecca Sekulic	6–3, 4–6, 3–6
Loss	1–8	Feb 2017	ITF Hammamet, Tunisia	W15	Clay	(Chinese Taipei) Hsu Chieh-yu	2–6, 6–2, 1–6
Win	2–8	Oct 2017	ITF Sharm El Sheikh, Egypt	W15	Hard	(Russia) Anastasia Pribylova	1–6, 6–1, 6–1
Win	3–8	Oct 2017	ITF Sharm El Sheikh	W15	Hard	(Denmark) Emilie Francati	6–3, 6–3
Loss	3–9	Nov 2017	ITF Sharm El Sheikh	W15	Hard	(Spain) Nuria Párrizas Díaz	5–7, 6–3, 6–7^{(3)}
Win	4–9	Dec 2017	ITF Cairo, Egypt	W15	Clay	(Slovenia) Nastja Kolar	6–4, 6–1
Win	5–9	Feb 2018	ITF Hammamet, Tunisia	W15	Clay	(Bosnia and Herzegovina) Nefisa Berberović	6–3, 6–3
Win	6–9	May 2018	ITF Cairo, Egypt	W15	Clay	(United States) Shelby Talcott	6–0, 6–3
Win	7–9	Sep 2018	ITF Cairo, Egypt	W15	Clay	(Russia) Anna Ureke	6–0, 2–1 ret.
Win	8–9	Dec 2018	ITF Cairo, Egypt	W15	Clay	(Italy) Michele Alexandra Zmău	6–2, 3–6, 6–3
Loss	8–10	Dec 2018	ITF Cairo, Egypt	W15	Clay	(Ukraine) Anastasiya Shoshyna	4–6, 6–1, 4–6
Loss	8–11	Jul 2019	ITF Getxo, Spain	W25	Clay (i)	(Greece) Despina Papamichail	2–6, 4–6
Loss	8–12	Aug 2019	ITF Tabarka, Tunisia	W15	Clay	(Romania) Andreea Prisăcariu	4–6, 4–6
Loss	8–13	Sep 2019	ITF Cairo, Egypt	W15	Clay	(Sweden) Fanny Östlund	3–6, 4–6
Win	9–13	Sep 2019	ITF Cairo, Egypt	W15	Clay	(Slovenia) Nastja Kolar	6–3, 6–4
Loss	9–14	Sep 2019	ITF Cairo, Egypt	W15	Clay	(Slovenia) Nastja Kolar	3–6, 7–5, 6–7^{(4)}
Win	10–14	Nov 2019	ITF Sharm El Sheikh, Egypt	W15	Hard	(Poland) Joanna Zawadzka	6–2, 6–1
Win	11–14	Mar 2020	ITF Cairo, Egypt	W15	Clay	(India) Zeel Desai	5–7, 7–6^{(7)}, 6–2
Loss	11–15	Oct 2020	ITF Sharm El Sheikh	W15	Hard	(Ukraine) Ganna Poznikhirenko	2–6, 4–6
Win	12–15	Oct 2020	ITF Sharm El Sheikh	W15	Hard	(Chinese Taipei) Joanna Garland	6–4, 6–2
Loss	12–16	Apr 2021	ITF Cairo, Egypt	W15	Clay	(Russia) Maria Timofeeva	3–6, 3–6
Loss	12–17	Aug 2022	ITF Cairo, Egypt	W15	Clay	(Japan) Mayuka Aikawa	3–6, 5–7
Win	13–17	Sep 2022	ITF Cairo, Egypt	W15	Clay	(Italy) Anastasia Abbagnato	6–2, 6–0
Loss	13–18	Mar 2023	ITF Sharm El Sheikh	W15	Hard	(Romania) Karola Bejenaru	4–6, 2–6
Win	14–18	Sep 2023	ITF Sharm El Sheikh	W15	Hard	(Romania) Elena-Teodora Cadar	4–6, 6–4, 6-1
Win	15–18	Oct 2023	ITF Sharm El Sheikh	W15	Hard	(Romania) Elena-Teodora Cadar	5–7, 6–3, 7–5
Loss	15–19	Feb 2024	ITF Sharm El Sheikh	W15	Hard	(Slovakia) Katarína Kužmová	6–4, 5–7, 4–6
Win	16–19	Mar 2024	ITF Sharm El Sheikh	W15	Hard	(Czech Republic) Laura Samson	6–0, 6–4
Loss	16–20	Sep 2024	ITF Sharm El Sheikh	W15	Hard	(Egypt) Lamis Alhussein Abdel Aziz	3–6, 3–6
Loss	16–21	Sep 2024	ITF Sharm El Sheikh	W15	Hard	Daria Egorova	5–7, 0–6
Loss	16–22	Oct 2024	ITF Sharm El Sheikh	W15	Hard	(Poland) Zuzanna Pawlikowska	5–7, 7–6^{(3)}, 5–7
Win	17–22	Sep 2025	ITF Hurghada, Egypt	W15	Hard	(Slovakia) Katarína Kužmová	2–0 ret.
Loss	17–23	Sep 2025	ITF Hurghada, Egypt	W15	Hard	Daria Khomutsianskaya	4–6, 3–6
Win	18–23	Nov 2025	ITF Sharm El Sheikh	W15	Hard	(Egypt) Lamis Alhussein Abdel Aziz	4–6, 6–3, 7–5
Win	19–23	Nov 2025	ITF Sharm El Sheikh	W15	Hard	(Egypt) Lamis Alhussein Abdel Aziz	2–6, 7–6^{(3)}, 7–6^{(3)}
Loss	19–24	Feb 2026	ITF Sharm El Sheikh	W15	Hard	(Egypt) Lamis Alhussein Abdel Aziz	5–7, 6–4, 6–7^{(3)}
Win	20–24	Mar 2026	ITF Sharm El Sheikh	W15	Hard	(Bulgaria) Iva Ivanova	6–4, 7–5
Loss	20–25	Oct 2026	ITF Sharm El Sheikh	W15	Hard	Kamilla Bartone	6–4, 4–6, 4–6

=== Doubles: 45 (20 titles, 25 runner-ups) ===
Legend W50 tournaments W25/35 tournaments W10/15 tournaments	Finals by surface Hard (12–6) Clay (8–18) Carpet (0–1)

Result	W–L	Date	Tournament	Tier	Surface	Partnering	Opponents	Score
Win	1–0	Apr 2015	ITF Cairo, Egypt	W15	Clay	(Austria) Barbara Haas	(France) Amandine Hesse (France) Marine Partaud	0–6, 6–4, [10–7]
Win	2–0	Nov 2015	ITF Cairo, Egypt	W10	Clay	(Hungary) Naomi Totka	(Egypt) Ola Abou Zekry (Romania) Ana Bianca Mihăilă	7–5, 6–7^{(9)}, [13–11]
Win	3–0	Sep 2016	ITF Sharm El Sheikh, Egypt	W10	Hard	(Romania) Ana Bianca Mihăilă	(India) Sharmada Balu (India) Dhruthi Tatachar Venugopal	6–4, 6–1
Loss	3–1	Jan 2017	ITF Cairo, Egypt	W15	Clay	(Oman) Fatma Al-Nabhani	(Japan) Ayaka Okuno (Slovakia) Chantal Škamlová	6–4, 4–6, [6–10]
Loss	3–2	Jan 2017	ITF Cairo, Egypt	W15	Clay	(Oman) Fatma Al-Nabhani	(Japan) Ayaka Okuno (Slovakia) Chantal Škamlová	3–6, 1–6
Loss	3–3	Feb 2017	ITF Cairo, Egypt	W15	Clay	(United States) Shelby Talcott	(India) Natasha Palha (India) Rishika Sunkara	2–6, 1–6
Win	4–3	Feb 2017	ITF Hammamet, Tunisia	W15	Clay	(Chinese Taipei) Hsu Chieh-yu	(Sweden) Ida Jarlskog (Sweden) Julia Rosenqvist	6–2, 7–5
Loss	4–4	Apr 2017	ITF Sharm El Sheikh, Egypt	W15	Hard	(Egypt) Ola Abou Zekry	(Montenegro) Ana Veselinović (China) You Xiaodi	3–6, 5–7
Loss	4–5	Jul 2017	ITF Darmstadt, Germany	W25	Clay	(Liechtenstein) Kathinka von Deichmann	(Romania) Laura Ioana Andrei (Czech Republic) Anastasia Zarycká	6–4, 6–7^{(5)}, [3–10]
Loss	4–6	Feb 2018	ITF Hammamet, Tunisia	W15	Clay	(Chinese Taipei) Hsu Chieh-yu	(Italy) Melania Delia (Italy) Angelica Moratelli	2–6, 4–6
Loss	4–7	May 2018	ITF Cairo, Egypt	W15	Clay	(Egypt) Ola Abou Zekry	(Egypt) Lamis Alhussein Abdel Aziz (Canada) Maria Patrascu	6–4, 3–6, [9–11]
Win	5–7	Jul 2018	ITF Torino, Italy	W25	Clay	(Germany) Vivian Heisen	(Italy) Martina Caregaro (Italy) Federica di Sarra	6–3, 6–2
Win	6–7	Sep 2018	ITF Cairo, Egypt	W15	Clay	(Romania) Michele Zmău	(Egypt) Yasmin Ezzat (Ecuador) Charlotte Roemer	6–2, 6–1
Loss	6–8	Dec 2018	ITF Cairo, Egypt	W15	Clay	(Ukraine) Anastasiya Shoshyna	(Japan) Minami Akiyama (Ukraine) Viktoriia Dema	2–6, 7–6^{(2)}, [6–10]
Loss	6–9	Jul 2019	ITF Imola, Italy	W25	Carpet	(United States) Rasheeda McAdoo	(Brazil) Paula Cristina Gonçalves (Switzerland) Nina Stadler	4–6, 2–6
Loss	6–10	Aug 2019	ITF Tabarka, Tunisia	W15	Clay	(Italy) Beatrice Lombardo	(Slovakia) Katarina Kuzmová (Serbia) Elena Milovanović	6–3, 3–6, [7–10]
Loss	6–11	Sep 2019	ITF Cairo, Egypt	W15	Clay	(Serbia) Bojana Marinković	(Egypt) Lamis Alhussein Abdel Aziz (Russia) Anastasia Zolotareva	5–7, 6–2, [3–10]
Loss	6–12	Oct 2019	Lagos Open, Nigeria	W25	Hard	(India) Prarthana Thombare	(India) Rutuja Bhosale (Brazil) Laura Pigossi	6–4, 4–6, [7–10]
Loss	6–13	Oct 2019	Lagos Open, Nigeria	W25	Hard	(India) Prarthana Thombare	(India) Rutuja Bhosale (Brazil) Laura Pigossi	3–6, 7–6^{(3)}, [6–10]
Win	7–13	Nov 2019	ITF Sharm El Sheikh, Egypt	W15	Clay	(Italy) Federica Prati	(South Africa) Warona Mdlulwa (Argentina) Catalina Pella	6–2, 6–2
Win	8–13	Mar 2020	ITF Cairo, Egypt	W15	Clay	(Sweden) Jacqueline Cabaj Awad	(India) Zeel Desai (Poland) Stefania Rogozińska	7–5, 6–2
Loss	8–14	Jan 2021	ITF Cairo, Egypt	W15	Clay	(Sweden) Fanny Östlund	(United States) Anastasia Nefedova (Netherlands) Lexie Stevens	1–6, 4–6
Win	9–14	Aug 2021	ITF Cairo, Egypt	W15	Clay	(Kazakhstan) Zhibek Kulambayeva	(Colombia) María Paulina Pérez (Ecuador) Mell Reasco	7–5, 6–3
Loss	9–15	Aug 2021	Vrnjačka Banja Open, Serbia	W25	Clay	(Romania) Ioana Loredana Roșca	(Brazil) Carolina Alves (Venezuela) Andrea Gámiz	4–6, 1–6
Loss	9–16	Dec 2021	ITF Cairo, Egypt	W15	Clay	(Kazakhstan) Yekaterina Dmitrichenko	(Belarus) Aliona Falei (Russia) Anastasia Zolotareva	4–6, 2–6
Loss	9–17	Sep 2022	ITF Cairo, Egypt	W25	Clay	(Romania) Elena-Teodora Cadar	(Japan) Mayuka Aikawa (Sweden) Vanessa Ersöz	1–6, 5–7
Loss	9–18	Sep 2022	ITF Otočec, Slovenia	W25	Clay	(Chinese Taipei) Yang Ya-yi	Irina Khromacheva; Iryna Shymanovich	2–6, 4–6
Win	10–18	Dec 2022	ITF Sharm El Sheikh, Egypt	W15	Hard	(Italy) Anastasia Abbagnato	(Belgium) Tilwith Di Girolami (Netherlands) Stéphanie Visscher	w/o
Loss	10–19	Feb 2023	ITF Antalya, Turkiye	W25	Clay	(Hong Kong) Cody Wong	(Slovenia) Nika Radišić (Romania) Cristina Dinu	5–7, 2–6
Win	11–19	Mar 2023	ITF Sharm El Sheikh	W15	Hard	Polina Iatcenko	(South Korea) Back Da-yeon (South Korea) Jeong Bo-young	6–4, 7–5
Loss	11–20	Aug 2023	ITF Monastir, Tunisia	W15	Hard	(Switzerland) Kristina Milenkovic	Anastasiia Gureva (Slovakia) Radka Zelnicková	3–6, 7–5, [9–11]
Win	12–20	Sep 2023	ITF Monastir, Tunisia	W15	Hard	(United Kingdom) Katie Dyson	(Kazakhstan) Aruzhan Sagandikova (Kazakhstan) Zhanel Rustemova	6–2, 6–2
Win	13–20	Sep 2023	ITF Sharm El Sheikh	W15	Hard	(Romania) Elena-Teodora Cadar	(India) Ashmitha Easwaramurthi; Anna Sedysheva	6–2, 7–5
Win	14–20	Sep 2023	ITF Sharm El Sheikh	W15	Hard	(Romania) Elena-Teodora Cadar	(Poland) Zuzanna Kolonus (Slovakia) Laura Cíleková	6–1, 6–4
Loss	14–21	Jul 2024	ITF Casablanca, Morocco	W35	Clay	(Switzerland) Chelsea Fontenel	(Morocco) Malak El Allami (Morocco) Aya El Aouni	2–6, 2–6
Win	15–21	Sep 2024	ITF Sharm El Sheikh	W15	Hard	(Sweden) Jacqueline Cabaj Awad	(Slovakia) Salma Drugdová (Romania) Briana Szabó	6–4, 6–0
Win	16–21	Sep 2024	ITF Sharm El Sheikh	W15	Hard	(Poland) Zuzanna Pawlikowska	Daria Egorova; Anastasia Gasanova	6–3, 6–4
Win	17–21	Aug 2025	ITF Logroño, Spain	W15	Hard	(France) Alyssa Réguer	(Spain) Leire San José (Spain) Maria Trujillo Garnica	6–4, 6–0
Loss	17–22	Sep 2025	ITF Monastir, Tunisia	W35	Hard	(United Kingdom) Lauryn John-Baptiste	(United Kingdom) Mika Stojsavljevic (Czech Republic) Vendula Valdmannová	4–6, 4–6
Win	18–22	Oct 2025	ITF Sharm El Sheikh Egypt	W15	Hard	(Egypt) Aya El Sayed	Daria Belyaeva; Darya Kharlanova	2–6, 6–4, [10–7]
Win	19–22	Feb 2026	ITF Sharm El Sheikh	W15	Hard	(Turkey) Defne Çırpanlı	(Kosovo) Arlinda Rushiti (Germany) Anja Wildgruber	w/o
Loss	19–23	Apr 2026	ITF Sharm El Sheikh	W35	Hard	(Slovakia) Radka Zelníčková	(Poland) Martyna Kubka (Slovakia) Katarína Kužmová	4–6, 1–6
Loss	19–24	Jul 2026	ITF Darmstadt, Germany	W50	Clay	(Germany) Joëlle Steur	(Australia) Gabriella Da Silva-Fick (Australia) Tenika McGiffin	5–7, 6–7^{(4)}
Loss	19–25	Jul 2026	ITF Knokke-Heist, Belgium	W50	Clay	(Poland) Daria Kuczer	(United States) Julia Adams (Netherlands) Merel Hoedt	6–7^{(5)}, 2–6
Win	20–25	Oct 2026	ITF Sharm El Sheikh	W15	Hard	(Egypt) Lamis Alhussein Abdel Aziz	(Croatia) Karla Popović (Bulgaria) Isabella Shinikova	6–1, 7–6^{(4)}
