= 2017 Ando Securities Open =

- Date: 6–12 November
- Edition: 3rd
- Category: ITF Women's Circuit
- Prize money: $100,000
- Surface: Hard
- Location: Tokyo, Japan

Champions

Singles
- (China) Zhang Shuai

Doubles
- (Japan) Rika Fujiwara / (Japan) Yuki Naito
← 2016 ·	Ando Securities Open	· 2019 →

The 2017 Ando Securities Open was a professional tennis tournament played on outdoor hard courts. It was the third edition of the tournament and was part of the 2017 ITF Women's Circuit. It took place in Tokyo, Japan, on 6–12 November 2017.

== Singles main draw entrants ==
=== Seeds ===
Country	Player	Rank^{1}	Seed
CHN	Zhang Shuai	36	1
ROU	Mihaela Buzărnescu	72	2
JPN	Kurumi Nara	101	3
JPN	Risa Ozaki	102	4
JPN	Eri Hozumi	164	5
HUN	Dalma Gálfi	173	6
KOR	Jang Su-jeong	178	7
ITA	Georgia Brescia	185	8

- ^{1} Rankings as of 30 October 2017.

=== Other entrants ===
The following players received a wildcard into the singles main draw:

- (Japan) Yuki Naito
- (Japan) Makoto Ninomiya
- (Japan) Kyōka Okamura
- (Japan) Himari Satō

The following players received entry from the qualifying draw:

- (United States) Naomi Cheong
- (United States) Tori Kinard
- (Japan) Mei Yamaguchi
- (Japan) Aiko Yoshitomi

== Champions ==
=== Singles ===
- (China) Zhang Shuai def. (Romania) Mihaela Buzărnescu, 6–4, 6–0

=== Doubles ===
- (Japan) Rika Fujiwara / (Japan) Yuki Naito def. (Japan) Eri Hozumi / (Japan) Junri Namigata, 6–1, 6–3
