= 2016 Ando Securities Open =

Tennis tournament

- Date: 7–13 November
- Edition: 2nd
- Category: ITF Women's Circuit
- Prize money: $100,000
- Surface: Hard
- Location: Tokyo, Japan

Champions

Singles
- (China) Zhang Shuai

Doubles
- (Japan) Rika Fujiwara / (Japan) Yuki Naito
← 2015 ·	Ando Securities Open	· 2017 →

The 2016 Ando Securities Open was a professional tennis tournament played on outdoor hard courts. It was the 2nd edition of the tournament and part of the 2016 ITF Women's Circuit, offering a total of $100,000 in prize money. It took place in Tokyo, Japan, on 7–13 November 2016.

== Singles main draw entrants ==
=== Seeds ===
Country	Player	Rank^{1}	Seed
CHN	Zhang Shuai	28	1
JPN	Kurumi Nara	78	2
JPN	Nao Hibino	84	3
GBR	Naomi Broady	88	4
GRE	Maria Sakkari	89	5
TPE	Hsieh Su-wei	95	6
JPN	Risa Ozaki	103	7
ESP	Sara Sorribes Tormo	107	8

- ^{1} Rankings as of 31 October 2016.

=== Other entrants ===
The following player received a wildcard into the singles main draw:

- (Japan) Mayo Hibi
- (Japan) Yuki Naito
- (Japan) Makoto Ninomiya

The following player received entry by a protected ranking:

- (Croatia) Jana Fett

The following player received entry by a junior exempt:

- (Hungary) Dalma Gálfi

The following players received entry from the qualifying draw:

- (Japan) Miharu Imanishi
- (United States) Jamie Loeb
- (Belgium) An-Sophie Mestach
- (Japan) Junri Namigata

== Champions ==
=== Singles ===
- (China) Zhang Shuai def. (Hungary) Dalma Gálfi, 4–6, 7–6^{(7–2)}, 6–2

=== Doubles ===
- (Japan) Rika Fujiwara / (Japan) Yuki Naito def. (United States) Jamie Loeb / (Belgium) An-Sophie Mestach, 6–4, 6–7^{(12–14)}, [10–8]
