= 2019 Ando Securities Open – Doubles =

Doubles
- 2019 Ando Securities Open

Final
- Champions: (South Korea) Choi Ji-hee (South Korea) Han Na-lae
- Runners-up: (Japan) Haruka Kaji (Japan) Junri Namigata
- Score: 6–3, 6–3

Events
Singles	Doubles
← 2017 ·	Ando Securities Open	· 2022 →

Rika Fujiwara and Yuki Naito were the two-time defending champions, having won the previous editions in 2016 and 2017, however both players chose not to participate.

Choi Ji-hee and Han Na-lae won the title, defeating Haruka Kaji and Junri Namigata in the final, 6–3, 6–3.

== Seeds ==
1. (Japan) Nao Hibino / (Japan) Miyu Kato (quarterfinals)
2. (Japan) Eri Hozumi / (Japan) Makoto Ninomiya (quarterfinals, withdrew)
3. (Japan) Haruka Kaji / (Japan) Junri Namigata (final)
4. (South Korea) Choi Ji-hee / (South Korea) Han Na-lae (champions)

== Draw ==
=== Key ===
- Q = Qualifier
- WC = Wild card
- LL = Lucky loser
- Alt = Alternate
- SE = Special exempt
- PR = Protected ranking
- ITF = ITF entry
- JE = Junior exempt
- w/o = Walkover
- r = Retired
- d = Defaulted
- SR = Special ranking

=== Draw ===
First round
1	(Japan) N Hibino (Japan) M Kato	4	6	[10]
(China) S Xu (China) X You	6	0	[3]
(Japan) K Morisaki (Japan) M Yonehara	6	6
(United States) N Cheong (Japan) R Ushijima	1	4
4	(South Korea) J-h Choi (South Korea) N-l Han	6	6
(Japan) R Saigo (Japan) Y Saigo	0	1
(Japan) M Ayukawa (Japan) E Sema	2	7	[5]
(Japan) K Nara (Japan) Y Tanaka	6	5	[10]
(Japan) M Imanishi (China) F Liu	2	6	[6]
(Serbia) N Kostić (South Africa) C Simmonds	6	3	[10]
(Japan) M Ozeki (Australia) I Popovic	4	3
3	(Japan) H Kaji (Japan) J Namigata	6	6
(South Korea) S-j Jang (South Korea) D-b Kim	3	6	[8]
(Japan) E Hayashi (Japan) A Shimizu	6	2	[10]
(Japan) A Nagata (Japan) N Sato	1	2
2	(Japan) E Hozumi (Japan) M Ninomiya	6	6

Quarterfinals
1	(Japan) N Hibino (Japan) M Kato	3	2
(Japan) K Morisaki (Japan) M Yonehara	6	6
4	(South Korea) J-h Choi (South Korea) N-l Han	2	6	[13]
(Japan) K Nara (Japan) Y Tanaka	6	1	[11]
(Serbia) N Kostić (South Africa) C Simmonds	3	3
3	(Japan) H Kaji (Japan) J Namigata	6	6
(Japan) E Hayashi (Japan) A Shimizu	w/o
2	(Japan) E Hozumi (Japan) M Ninomiya

Semifinals
(Japan) K Morisaki (Japan) M Yonehara	6^{2}	1
4	(South Korea) J-h Choi (South Korea) N-l Han	7^{7}	6
3	(Japan) H Kaji (Japan) J Namigata	6	7^{7}
(Japan) E Hayashi (Japan) A Shimizu	3	6^{4}

Final
4	(South Korea) J-h Choi (South Korea) N-l Han	6	6
3	(Japan) H Kaji (Japan) J Namigata	3	3
