= 2023 ACT Clay Court International 1 =

Tennis tournament

- Date: 13–19 March 2023
- Edition: 9th
- Category: ITF Women's World Tennis Tour
- Prize money: $60,000
- Surface: Clay / Outdoor
- Location: Canberra, Australia

Champions

Singles
- (Australia) Priscilla Hon

Doubles
- (Australia) Elysia Bolton / (Australia) Alexandra Bozovic
← 2022 ·	ACT Clay Court International	· 2024 →

The 2023 ACT Clay Court International 1 was a professional tennis tournament played on outdoor clay courts. It was the ninth edition of the tournament, which was part of the 2023 ITF Women's World Tennis Tour. It took place in Canberra, Australia, between 13 and 19 March 2023.

== Champions ==
=== Singles ===
- (Australia) Priscilla Hon def. (Australia) Olivia Gadecki, 4–6, 6–2, 6–4

=== Doubles ===
- (Australia) Elysia Bolton / (Australia) Alexandra Bozovic def. (Australia) Priscilla Hon / (Slovenia) Dalila Jakupović, 4–6, 7–5, [13–11]

== Singles main draw entrants ==
=== Seeds ===
Country	Player	Rank	Seed
AUS	Olivia Gadecki	144	1
AUS	Jaimee Fourlis	152	2
AUS	Priscilla Hon	189	3
SLO	Dalila Jakupović	243	4
JPN	Yuki Naito	248	5
TPE	Joanna Garland	269	6
AUS	Alexandra Bozovic	294	7
AUS	Destanee Aiava	297	8

- Rankings are as of 6 March 2023.

=== Other entrants ===
The following players received entry from the qualifying draw:

- (Australia) Roopa Bains
- (New Zealand) Monique Barry
- (Australia) Elysia Bolton
- (Australia) Zara Brankovic
- (Japan) Hayu Kinoshita
- (Australia) Kaylah McPhee
- (Australia) Elena Micic
- (Japan) Riko Sawayanagi

The following player received entry as a lucky loser:

- (Australia) Lisa Mays
