= 2022 Ando Securities Open =

Tennis tournament

- Date: 14–20 November 2022
- Edition: 5th
- Category: ITF Women's World Tennis Tour
- Prize money: $60,000
- Surface: Hard / Indoor
- Location: Tokyo, Japan

Champions

Singles
- (China) Wang Xinyu

Doubles
- (Chinese Taipei) Hsieh Yu-chieh / (Indonesia) Jessy Rompies
- ITF Tokyo Ariake Open

The 2022 Ando Securities Open was a professional tennis tournament played on indoor hard courts. It was the fifth edition of the tournament which was part of the 2022 ITF Women's World Tennis Tour. It took place in Tokyo, Japan between 14 and 20 November 2022.

== Champions ==
=== Singles ===
- (China) Wang Xinyu def. (Japan) Moyuka Uchijima, 6–1, 4–6, 6–3

=== Doubles ===
- (Chinese Taipei) Hsieh Yu-chieh / (Indonesia) Jessy Rompies def. (Japan) Mai Hontama / (Japan) Junri Namigata, 6–4, 6–3

== Singles main draw entrants ==
=== Seeds ===
Country	Player	Rank^{1}	Seed
CHN	Wang Xinyu	97	1
JPN	Moyuka Uchijima	105	2
JPN	Nao Hibino	137	3
KOR	Han Na-lae	176	4
JPN	Misaki Doi	180	5
JPN	Mai Hontama	212	6
JPN	Himeno Sakatsume	294	7
JPN	Kyōka Okamura	306	8

- ^{1} Rankings are as of 7 November 2022.

=== Other entrants ===
The following players received wildcards into the singles main draw:

- (Japan) Kyoka Kubo
- (Japan) Ayumi Morita
- (Japan) Riko Sawayanagi
- (Japan) Ena Shibahara

The following player received entry into the singles main draw using a protected ranking:

- (Japan) Ayano Shimizu

The following players received entry from the qualifying draw:

- (Japan) Hiromi Abe
- (Japan) Sayaka Ishii
- (Japan) Funa Kozaki
- (Japan) Miho Kuramochi
- (Japan) Sara Saito
- (Japan) Naho Sato
- (Japan) Eri Shimizu
- (Japan) Risa Ushijima
