= 2016 Ando Securities Open – Singles =

Singles
- 2016 Ando Securities Open

Final
- Champion: (China) Zhang Shuai
- Runner-up: (Hungary) Dalma Gálfi
- Score: 4–6, 7–6^{(7–2)}, 6–2

Events
Singles	Doubles
- Ando Securities Open

Zhang Shuai was the defending champion and successfully defended her title, defeating Dalma Gálfi in the final, 4–6, 7–6^{(7–2)}, 6–2.

== Seeds ==
1. (China) Zhang Shuai (champion)
2. (Japan) Kurumi Nara (quarterfinals)
3. (Japan) Nao Hibino (second round)
4. (United Kingdom) Naomi Broady (second round)
5. (Greece) Maria Sakkari (second round)
6. (Chinese Taipei) Hsieh Su-wei (first round)
7. (Japan) Risa Ozaki (second round)
8. (Spain) Sara Sorribes Tormo (second round)

== Main draw ==
Key

- Q = Qualifier
- WC = Wild card
- LL = Lucky loser
- Alt = Alternate
- ITF = ITF entry
- PR = Protected ranking
- SR = Special ranking
- SE = Special exempt
- JE = Junior exempt
- JR = Junior Accelerator Programme entrant
- CO = College Accelerator Programme entrant
- NG = Next Gen Accelerator Program entrant
- w/o = Walkover
- r = Retired
- d = Defaulted

=== Finals ===
Semifinals
1	(China) Zhang Shuai	3	6	7^{7}
(China) Peng Shuai	6	1	6^{3}
JE	(Hungary) Dalma Gálfi	6	6
(Germany) Tatjana Maria	1	4

Final
1	(China) Zhang Shuai	4	7^{7}	6
JE	(Hungary) Dalma Gálfi	6	6^{2}	2

=== Top half ===
First round
1	(China) S Zhang	6	6
(Japan) H Kuwata	1	4
(Belarus) A Sabalenka	6	6
(Serbia) N Stojanović	3	3
(Thailand) L Kumkhum	6	6
(Belgium) A Van Uytvanck	4	3
Q	(Belgium) A-S Mestach	0	4
5	(Greece) M Sakkari	6	6
4	(United Kingdom) N Broady	6	6
Q	(Japan) J Namigata	2	3
(Japan) E Hozumi	7^{7}	6^{2}	2
(South Korea) S-j Jang	6^{2}	7^{7}	6
(China) S Peng	6	6
(United States) J Boserup	2	2
(Turkey) İ Soylu	6	0	4
7	(Japan) R Ozaki	4	6	6

Second round
1	(China) S Zhang	6	6
(Belarus) A Sabalenka	4	2
(Thailand) L Kumkhum	6	6
5	(Greece) M Sakkari	4	3
4	(United Kingdom) N Broady	1	6	6^{6}
(South Korea) S-j Jang	6	4	7^{8}
(China) S Peng	6	6
7	(Japan) R Ozaki	1	4

Quarterfinals
1	(China) S Zhang	7^{7}	6
(Thailand) L Kumkhum	6^{3}	1
(South Korea) S-j Jang	4	1
(China) S Peng	6	6

Semifinals
1	(China) S Zhang	3	6	7^{7}
(China) S Peng	6	1	6^{3}

=== Bottom half ===
First round
6	(Chinese Taipei) S-w Hsieh	2	6	4
(Uzbekistan) N Abduraimova	6	2	6
Q	(United States) J Loeb	3	3
PR	(Croatia) J Fett	6	6
JE	(Hungary) D Gálfi	6	6
WC	(Japan) M Hibi	3	0
(Czech Republic) T Martincová	2	4
3	(Japan) N Hibino	6	6
8	(Spain) S Sorribes Tormo	6	6
(Japan) M Kato	4	4
(Germany) T Maria	6	6
Q	(Japan) M Imanishi	4	2
WC	(Japan) M Ninomiya	5	6^{3}
WC	(Japan) Y Naito	7	7^{7}
(Romania) PM Țig	5	6	2
2	(Japan) K Nara	7	2	6

Second round
(Uzbekistan) N Abduraimova	3	2
PR	(Croatia) J Fett	6	6
JE	(Hungary) D Gálfi	6	6
3	(Japan) N Hibino	3	4
8	(Spain) S Sorribes Tormo	3	1
(Germany) T Maria	6	6
WC	(Japan) Y Naito	1	3
2	(Japan) K Nara	6	6

Quarterfinals
PR	(Croatia) J Fett	3	4
JE	(Hungary) D Gálfi	6	6
(Germany) T Maria	6	7^{7}
2	(Japan) K Nara	3	6^{4}

Semifinals
JE	(Hungary) D Gálfi	6	6
(Germany) T Maria	1	4
