= 2023 ACT Clay Court International 1 – Singles =

Singles
- 2023 ACT Clay Court International 1

Final
- Champion: (Australia) Priscilla Hon
- Runner-up: (Australia) Olivia Gadecki
- Score: 4–6, 6–2, 6–4

Events
| Singles | Doubles |
| ← 2022 · | ACT Clay Court International | · 2024 → |

Moyuka Uchijima was the defending champion but chose not to participate.

Priscilla Hon won the title, defeating Olivia Gadecki in the final, 4–6, 6–2, 6–4.

== Seeds ==
1. (Australia) Olivia Gadecki (final)
2. (Australia) Jaimee Fourlis (first round)
3. (Australia) Priscilla Hon (champion)
4. (Slovenia) Dalila Jakupović (semifinals)
5. (Japan) Yuki Naito (first round)
6. (Chinese Taipei) Joanna Garland (quarterfinals)
7. (Australia) Alexandra Bozovic (second round)
8. (Australia) Destanee Aiava (quarterfinals)

== Draw ==
=== Key ===
- Q = Qualifier
- WC = Wild card
- LL = Lucky loser
- Alt = Alternate
- SE = Special exempt
- PR = Protected ranking
- ITF = ITF entry
- JE = Junior exempt
- w/o = Walkover
- r = Retired
- d = Defaulted
- SR = Special ranking

=== Finals ===
Semifinals
1 | (Australia) Olivia Gadecki | 6 | 6
4 | (Slovenia) Dalila Jakupović | 3 | 2
3 | (Australia) Priscilla Hon | 6 | 6
(Japan) Haruka Kaji | 3 | 2

Final
1 | (Australia) Olivia Gadecki | 6 | 2 | 4
3 | (Australia) Priscilla Hon | 4 | 6 | 6

=== Top half ===
First round
1 | (Australia) O Gadecki | 6 | 6
LL | (Australia) L Mays | 0 | 0
Q | (Australia) R Bains | 2 | 1
(Chinese Taipei) Y-y Yang | 6 | 6
(Australia) P Hule | 6 | 6
Q | (New Zealand) M Barry | 2 | 1
(China) Y Wang | 3 | 4
7 | (Australia) A Bozovic | 6 | 6
4 | (Slovenia) D Jakupović | 6 | 6
(Japan) H Kuwata | 3 | 0
(Japan) M Doi | 6 | 6
(Japan) N Hanatani | 3 | 3
(Australia) A Parnaby | 6^{4} | 6 | 4
(Australia) M Inglis | 7^{7} | 4 | 6
(United Kingdom) N Bains | 6 | 4 | 3
8 | (Australia) D Aiava | 4 | 6 | 6

Second round
1 | (Australia) O Gadecki | 7 | 6
(Chinese Taipei) Y-y Yang | 5 | 0
(Australia) P Hule | 6 | 6
7 | (Australia) A Bozovic | 1 | 2
4 | (Slovenia) D Jakupović | 6 | 6
(Japan) M Doi | 3 | 2
(Australia) M Inglis | 1 | 2
8 | (Australia) D Aiava | 6 | 6

Quarterfinals
1 | (Australia) O Gadecki | 6 | 6
(Australia) P Hule | 2 | 1
4 | (Slovenia) D Jakupović | 6 | 6
8 | (Australia) D Aiava | 2 | 0

Semifinals
1 | (Australia) O Gadecki | 6 | 6
4 | (Slovenia) D Jakupović | 3 | 2

=== Bottom half ===
First round
6 | (Chinese Taipei) J Garland | 6 | 4 | 7
Q | (Australia) K McPhee | 2 | 6 | 5
Q | (Japan) H Kinoshita | 2 | 7^{8} | 2
Q | (Australia) E Bolton | 6 | 6^{6} | 6
Q | (Australia) E Micic | 6 | 4 | 4
(Japan) C Muramatsu | 0 | 6 | 6
(Thailand) P Kovapitukted | 3 | 2
3 | (Australia) P Hon | 6 | 6
5 | (Japan) Y Naito | 4 | 4
(Japan) H Kaji | 6 | 6
Q | (Japan) R Sawayanagi | 7 | 7
(France) I Ramialison | 5 | 5
(Chinese Taipei) E-s Liang | 6 | 6
Q | (Australia) Z Brankovic | 1 | 2
(Australia) Ar Rodionova | 6 | 3 | 7^{7}
2 | (Australia) J Fourlis | 4 | 6 | 6^{2}

Second round
6 | (Chinese Taipei) J Garland | 6 | 6
Q | (Australia) E Bolton | 3 | 4
(Japan) C Muramatsu | 5 | 1
3 | (Australia) P Hon | 7 | 6
(Japan) H Kaji | 6 | 4 | 6
Q | (Japan) R Sawayanagi | 2 | 6 | 2
(Chinese Taipei) E-s Liang | 4 | 6^{4}
(Australia) Ar Rodionova | 6 | 7^{7}

Quarterfinals
6 | (Chinese Taipei) J Garland | 3 | 3
3 | (Australia) P Hon | 6 | 6
(Japan) H Kaji | 3 | 6 | 6
(Australia) Ar Rodionova | 6 | 3 | 4

Semifinals
3 | (Australia) P Hon | 6 | 6
(Japan) H Kaji | 3 | 2
