= 2023 ACT Clay Court International 1 – Doubles =

Doubles
- 2023 ACT Clay Court International 1

Final
- Champions: (Australia) Elysia Bolton (Australia) Alexandra Bozovic
- Runners-up: (Australia) Priscilla Hon (Slovenia) Dalila Jakupović
- Score: 4–6, 7–5, [13–11]

Events
Singles	Doubles
← 2022 ·	ACT Clay Court International	· 2024 →

Han Na-lae and Jang Su-jeong were the defending champions but chose not to participate.

Elysia Bolton and Alexandra Bozovic won the title, defeating Priscilla Hon and Dalila Jakupović in the final, 4–6, 7–5, [13–11].

== Seeds ==
1. (United Kingdom) Naiktha Bains / (Chinese Taipei) Liang En-shuo (first round)
2. (Australia) Priscilla Hon / (Slovenia) Dalila Jakupović (final)
3. (Australia) Destanee Aiava / (Australia) Olivia Gadecki (semifinals)
4. (Australia) Elysia Bolton / (Australia) Alexandra Bozovic (champions)

== Draw ==
=== Key ===
- Q = Qualifier
- WC = Wild card
- LL = Lucky loser
- Alt = Alternate
- SE = Special exempt
- PR = Protected ranking
- ITF = ITF entry
- JE = Junior exempt
- w/o = Walkover
- r = Retired
- d = Defaulted
- SR = Special ranking

First round
1	(United Kingdom) N Bains (Chinese Taipei) E-s Liang	6	5	[9]
(Australia) M Inglis (Australia) K McPhee	3	7	[11]
(Australia) Z Brankovic (Australia) O Symons	6	6
(Australia) P Freeman (Australia) S McDonald	1	0
4	(Australia) E Bolton (Australia) A Bozovic	6	6
(Australia) L Mays (Australia) A Osborne	0	2
(Thailand) P Kovapitukted (Japan) H Kuwata	6	6
(Australia) M Krish (Australia) S Nayar	3	3
(Japan) E Hayashi (Japan) Y Naito	6	6
(Australia) M Frahn (Macau) J Lau	1	2
(Australia) R Bains (New Zealand) M Barry	1	1
3	(Australia) D Aiava (Australia) O Gadecki	6	6
(Japan) N Hanatani (Japan) R Sawayanagi	7	6
(Japan) H Kinoshita (Chinese Taipei) Y-y Yang	5	1
(Australia) I McLeod (Australia) A Narker	1	0
2	(Australia) P Hon (Slovenia) D Jakupović	6	6

Quarterfinals
(Australia) M Inglis (Australia) K McPhee	6	6
(Australia) Z Brankovic (Australia) O Symons	1	0
4	(Australia) E Bolton (Australia) A Bozovic	6	6
(Thailand) P Kovapitukted (Japan) H Kuwata	4	0
(Japan) E Hayashi (Japan) Y Naito	2	2
3	(Australia) D Aiava (Australia) O Gadecki	6	6
(Japan) N Hanatani (Japan) R Sawayanagi	6	2	[8]
2	(Australia) P Hon (Slovenia) D Jakupović	4	6	[10]

Semifinals
(Australia) M Inglis (Australia) K McPhee	3	2
4	(Australia) E Bolton (Australia) A Bozovic	6	6
3	(Australia) D Aiava (Australia) O Gadecki	3	3
2	(Australia) P Hon (Slovenia) D Jakupović	6	6

Final
4	(Australia) E Bolton (Australia) A Bozovic	4	7	[13]
2	(Australia) P Hon (Slovenia) D Jakupović	6	5	[11]
