= 2017 Ando Securities Open – Singles =

Singles
- 2017 Ando Securities Open

Final
- Champion: (China) Zhang Shuai
- Runner-up: (Romania) Mihaela Buzărnescu
- Score: 6–4, 6–0

Events
Singles	Doubles
- Ando Securities Open

Zhang Shuai was the two-time defending champion and successfully defended her title, defeating Mihaela Buzărnescu in the final, 6–4, 6–0.

== Seeds ==
1. (China) Zhang Shuai (champion)
2. (Romania) Mihaela Buzărnescu (final)
3. (Japan) Kurumi Nara (semifinals)
4. (Japan) Risa Ozaki (first round)
5. (Japan) Eri Hozumi (second round)
6. (Hungary) Dalma Gálfi (semifinals)
7. (South Korea) Jang Su-jeong (quarterfinals)
8. (Italy) Georgia Brescia (quarterfinals)

== Draw ==
Key

- Q = Qualifier
- WC = Wild card
- LL = Lucky loser
- Alt = Alternate
- ITF = ITF entry
- PR = Protected ranking
- SR = Special ranking
- SE = Special exempt
- JE = Junior exempt
- JR = Junior Accelerator Programme entrant
- CO = College Accelerator Programme entrant
- NG = Next Gen Accelerator Program entrant
- w/o = Walkover
- r = Retired
- d = Defaulted

=== Finals ===
Semifinals
1	(China) Zhang Shuai	3	6	6
3	(Japan) Kurumi Nara	6	1	3
6	(Hungary) Dalma Gálfi	7^{7}	1	4
2	(Romania) Mihaela Buzărnescu	6^{5}	6	6

Final
1	(China) Zhang Shuai	6	6
2	(Romania) Mihaela Buzărnescu	4	0

=== Top half ===
First round
1	(China) S Zhang	6	3
(China) J Kang	2	2^{r}
(Japan) M Imanishi	7	6
(Japan) C Muramatsu	5	2
Q	(Japan) M Yamaguchi	6	6
WC	(Japan) H Sato	2	3
(Serbia) D Radanović	2	0
7	(South Korea) S-j Jang	6	6
3	(Japan) K Nara	7	6
(Japan) Y Tanaka	5	1
WC	(Japan) Y Naito	5	6^{4}
(Japan) M Inoue	7	7^{7}
Q	(United States) T Kinard	7^{7}	6
(Japan) R Sawayanagi	6^{5}	4
(Hungary) Á Bukta	2	1
8	(Italy) G Brescia	6	6

Second round
1	(China) S Zhang	6	6
(Japan) M Imanishi	3	1
Q	(Japan) M Yamaguchi	5	4
7	(South Korea) S-j Jang	7	6
3	(Japan) K Nara	6	6
(Japan) M Inoue	3	2
Q	(United States) T Kinard	3	4
8	(Italy) G Brescia	6	6

Quarterfinals
1	(China) S Zhang	6	6
7	(South Korea) S-j Jang	2	2
3	(Japan) K Nara	6	4	7
8	(Italy) G Brescia	3	6	5

Semifinals
1	(China) S Zhang	3	6	6
3	(Japan) K Nara	6	1	3

=== Bottom half ===
First round
6	(Hungary) D Gálfi	6	6
Q	(Japan) A Yoshitomi	2	3
(South Korea) N-r Kim	6^{2}	2
(Japan) S Akita	7^{7}	6
Q	(United States) N Cheong	6	7
WC	(Japan) M Ninomiya	4	5
(Japan) M Hibi	6	6
4	(Japan) R Ozaki	1	1
5	(Japan) E Hozumi	6	7
(Japan) H Kaji	4	5
(Japan) J Namigata	6	6
(Japan) A Shimizu	0	2
(Hong Kong) L Zhang	2	3
(Japan) M Kobori	6	6
WC	(Japan) K Okamura	2	3
2	(Romania) M Buzărnescu	6	6

Second round
6	(Hungary) D Gálfi	6	7
(Japan) S Akita	4	5
Q	(United States) N Cheong	2	7	6
(Japan) M Hibi	6	5	2
5	(Japan) E Hozumi	7^{7}	3	3
(Japan) J Namigata	6^{4}	6	6
(Japan) M Kobori	3	3
2	(Romania) M Buzărnescu	6	6

Quarterfinals
6	(Hungary) D Gálfi	6	6
Q	(United States) N Cheong	3	3
(Japan) J Namigata	4	2
2	(Romania) M Buzărnescu	6	6

Semifinals
6	(Hungary) D Gálfi	7^{7}	1	4
2	(Romania) M Buzărnescu	6^{5}	6	6
