= 2022 ACT Clay Court International 1 =

Tennis tournament

- Date: 21–27 March 2022
- Edition: 7th
- Category: ITF Women's World Tennis Tour
- Prize money: $60,000
- Surface: Clay / Outdoor
- Location: Canberra, Australia

Champions

Singles
- (Japan) Moyuka Uchijima

Doubles
- (South Korea) Han Na-lae / (South Korea) Jang Su-jeong
← 2019 ·	ACT Clay Court International	· 2023 →

The 2022 ACT Clay Court International 1 was a professional tennis tournament played on outdoor clay courts. It was the seventh edition of the tournament which was part of the 2022 ITF Women's World Tennis Tour. It took place in Canberra, Australia between 21 and 27 March 2022.

== Singles main draw entrants ==
=== Seeds ===
Country	Player	Rank^{1}	Seed
ROU	Mihaela Buzărnescu	117	1
AUS	Arina Rodionova	177	2
KOR	Jang Su-jeong	178	3
JPN	Kurumi Nara	196	4
KOR	Han Na-lae	209	5
AUS	Ellen Perez	212	6
JPN	Yuki Naito	223	7
CRO	Jana Fett	231	8

- ^{1} Rankings are as of 7 March 2022.

=== Other entrants ===
The following players received wildcards into the singles main draw:

- (Australia) Destanee Aiava
- (Australia) Kimberly Birrell
- (Australia) Alexandra Bozovic
- (Australia) Abbie Myers

The following player received entry using a protected ranking:

- (India) Pranjala Yadlapalli

The following players received entry from the qualifying draw:

- (Japan) Shiho Akita
- (India) Rutuja Bhosale
- (Japan) Nagi Hanatani
- (Netherlands) Merel Hoedt
- (Japan) Hiroko Kuwata
- (Japan) Akiko Omae
- (Japan) Erika Sema
- (Australia) Olivia Tjandramulia

== Champions ==
=== Singles ===
- (Japan) Moyuka Uchijima def. (Australia) Olivia Gadecki, 6–2, 6–2

=== Doubles ===
- (South Korea) Han Na-lae / (South Korea) Jang Su-jeong def. (Japan) Yuki Naito / (Japan) Moyuka Uchijima, 3–6, 6–2, [10–5]
