= 2022 Ando Securities Open – Singles =

Singles
- 2022 Ando Securities Open

Final
- Champion: (China) Wang Xinyu
- Runner-up: (Japan) Moyuka Uchijima
- Score: 6–1, 4–6, 6–3

Events
Singles	Doubles
← 2019 ·	Ando Securities Open	· 2023 →

Zhang Shuai was the four-time defending champion but chose not to participate.

Wang Xinyu won the title, defeating Moyuka Uchijima in the final, 6–1, 4–6, 6–3.

== Seeds ==
1. (China) Wang Xinyu (champion)
2. (Japan) Moyuka Uchijima (final)
3. (Japan) Nao Hibino (second round)
4. (South Korea) Han Na-lae (semifinals)
5. (Japan) Misaki Doi (quarterfinals)
6. (Japan) Mai Hontama (quarterfinals)
7. (Japan) Himeno Sakatsume (second round)
8. (Japan) Kyōka Okamura (quarterfinals)

== Draw ==
=== Key ===
- Q = Qualifier
- WC = Wild card
- LL = Lucky loser
- Alt = Alternate
- SE = Special exempt
- PR = Protected ranking
- ITF = ITF entry
- JE = Junior exempt
- w/o = Walkover
- r = Retired
- d = Defaulted
- SR = Special ranking

=== Finals ===
Semifinals
1	(China) Wang Xinyu	6	3
(Ukraine) Katarina Zavatska	3	1^{r}
4	(South Korea) Han Na-lae	4	5
2	(Japan) Moyuka Uchijima	6	7

Final
1	(China) Wang Xinyu	6	4	6
2	(Japan) Moyuka Uchijima	1	6	3

=== Top half ===
First round
1	(China) Xin Wang	6	6
PR	(Japan) A Shimizu	2	3
(Japan) E Sema	0	6	4
Q	(Japan) S Ishii	6	0	6
Q	(Japan) F Kozaki	4	0
Q	(Japan) R Ushijima	6	6
WC	(Japan) E Shibahara	2	4
5	(Japan) M Doi	6	6
3	(Japan) N Hibino	6	6
(Thailand) L Kumkhum	3	2
(Ukraine) K Zavatska	6	6
(Japan) R Saigo	1	1
Q	(Japan) H Abe	6	6
(Japan) C Muramatsu	4	2
WC	(Japan) K Kubo	0	2
6	(Japan) M Hontama	6	6

Second round
1	(China) Xin Wang	7	6
Q	(Japan) S Ishii	5	2
Q	(Japan) R Ushijima	4	2
5	(Japan) M Doi	6	6
3	(Japan) N Hibino	2	6	3
(Ukraine) K Zavatska	6	3	6
Q	(Japan) H Abe	6^{3}	2
6	(Japan) M Hontama	7^{7}	6

Quarterfinals
1	(China) Xin Wang	3	6	6
5	(Japan) M Doi	6	3	3
(Ukraine) K Zavatska	6^{0}	6	6
6	(Japan) M Hontama	7^{7}	2	1

Semifinals
1	(China) Xin Wang	6	3
(Ukraine) K Zavatska	3	1^{r}

=== Bottom half ===
First round
8	(Japan) K Okamura	6	6
Q	(Japan) M Kuramochi	1	2
(Japan) H Kaji	1	2
(Japan) S Hosogi	6	6
(Thailand) P Plipuech	1	3
Q	(Japan) E Shimizu	6	6
WC	(Japan) A Morita	1	5
4	(South Korea) N-l Han	6	7
7	(Japan) H Sakatsume	6	6
Q	(Japan) S Saito	2	3
(Japan) H Kuwata	4	4
(Japan) M Kobori	6	6
Q	(Japan) N Sato	7^{7}	6
(India) R Bhosale	6^{2}	3
WC	(Japan) R Sawayanagi	3	3
2	(Japan) M Uchijima	6	6

Second round
8	(Japan) K Okamura	3	6	6
(Japan) S Hosogi	6	2	4
Q	(Japan) E Shimizu	3	3
4	(South Korea) N-l Han	6	6
7	(Japan) H Sakatsume	4	2
(Japan) M Kobori	6	6
Q	(Japan) N Sato	1	0
2	(Japan) M Uchijima	6	6

Quarterfinals
8	(Japan) K Okamura	6^{8}	2
4	(South Korea) N-l Han	7^{10}	6
(Japan) M Kobori	1	4
2	(Japan) M Uchijima	6	6

Semifinals
4	(South Korea) N-l Han	4	5
2	(Japan) M Uchijima	6	7
