= 2022 ACT Clay Court International 1 – Singles =

Singles
- 2022 ACT Clay Court International 1

Final
- Champion: (Japan) Moyuka Uchijima
- Runner-up: (Australia) Olivia Gadecki
- Score: 6–2, 6–2

Events
Singles	Doubles
← 2019 ·	ACT Clay Court International	· 2023 →

Destanee Aiava was the defending champion, but lost in the second round to Jang Su-jeong.

Moyuka Uchijima won the title, defeating Olivia Gadecki in the final, 6–2, 6–2.

== Seeds ==
1. (Romania) Mihaela Buzărnescu (first round)
2. (Australia) Arina Rodionova (first round)
3. (South Korea) Jang Su-jeong (quarterfinals)
4. (Japan) Kurumi Nara (semifinals)
5. (South Korea) Han Na-lae (quarterfinals)
6. (Australia) Ellen Perez (quarterfinals)
7. (Japan) Yuki Naito (second round)
8. (Croatia) Jana Fett (first round)

== Draw ==
=== Key ===
- Q = Qualifier
- WC = Wild card
- LL = Lucky loser
- Alt = Alternate
- SE = Special exempt
- PR = Protected ranking
- ITF = ITF entry
- JE = Junior exempt
- w/o = Walkover
- r = Retired
- d = Defaulted
- SR = Special ranking

=== Finals ===
Semifinals
(Australia) Olivia Gadecki	0	6	6
WC	(Australia) Kimberly Birrell	6	1	2
4	(Japan) Kurumi Nara	5	4
(Japan) Moyuka Uchijima	7	6

Final
(Australia) Olivia Gadecki	2	2
(Japan) Moyuka Uchijima	6	6

=== Top half ===
First round
1	(Romania) M Buzărnescu	3	7^{7}	2
(Australia) O Gadecki	6	6^{5}	6
(China) Jia Lu	6	7
Q	(Japan) E Sema	1	5
Q	(Japan) H Kuwata	6	6
WC	(Australia) A Myers	4	2
Q	(Japan) N Hanatani	3	0
5	(South Korea) N-l Han	6	6
3	(South Korea) S-j Jang	6	3	6
Q	(Australia) O Tjandramulia	2	6	0
(Japan) C Muramatsu	6	6^{6}	4
WC	(Australia) D Aiava	4	7^{8}	6
(India) A Raina	6	6
WC	(Australia) A Bozovic	0	3
WC	(Australia) K Birrell	6	4	6
8	(Croatia) J Fett	0	6	3

Second round
(Australia) O Gadecki	6	6
(China) Jia Lu	3	2
Q	(Japan) H Kuwata	2	0
5	(South Korea) N-l Han	6	6
3	(South Korea) S-j Jang	6	7^{7}
WC	(Australia) D Aiava	4	6^{4}
(India) A Raina	3	5
WC	(Australia) K Birrell	6	7

Quarterfinals
(Australia) O Gadecki	6	6
5	(South Korea) N-l Han	3	1
3	(South Korea) S-j Jang	2	7^{9}	4
WC	(Australia) K Birrell	6	6^{7}	6

Semifinals
(Australia) O Gadecki	0	6	6
WC	(Australia) K Birrell	6	1	2

=== Bottom half ===
First round
6	(Australia) E Perez	6	7^{11}
(Japan) K Okamura	4	6^{9}
Q	(Japan) A Omae	3	6	5
Q	(India) R Bhosale	6	2	7
(United States) S Vickery	2	2
Q	(Netherlands) M Hoedt	6	6
PR	(India) P Yadlapalli	3	2
4	(Japan) K Nara	6	6
7	(Japan) Y Naito	6	6
Q	(Japan) S Akita	4	4
(Japan) M Uchijima	6	7
(United States) K Day	3	5
(United Kingdom) N Bains	2	4
(Mexico) F Contreras	6	6
(Australia) J Fourlis	3	7^{7}	6
2	(Australia) Ar Rodionova	6	6^{2}	1

Second round
6	(Australia) E Perez	6	6
Q	(India) R Bhosale	3	2
Q	(Netherlands) M Hoedt	7	5	2
4	(Japan) K Nara	5	7	6
7	(Japan) Y Naito	4	6	4
(Japan) M Uchijima	6	4	6
(Mexico) F Contreras	4	6	4
(Australia) J Fourlis	6	4	6

Quarterfinals
6	(Australia) E Perez	7	2	3
4	(Japan) K Nara	5	6	6
(Japan) M Uchijima	7	6
(Australia) J Fourlis	5	4

Semifinals
4	(Japan) K Nara	5	4
(Japan) M Uchijima	7	6
