= 2015 Ando Securities Open – Singles =

Singles
- 2015 Ando Securities Open

Final
- Champion: (China) Zhang Shuai
- Runner-up: (Japan) Nao Hibino
- Score: 6–4, 6–1

Events
Singles	Doubles
- Ando Securities Open

This was a new event on the ITF Women's Circuit.

== Seeds ==
1. (Japan) Nao Hibino (final)
2. (Japan) Kurumi Nara (semifinals)
3. (Chinese Taipei) Hsieh Su-wei (semifinals)
4. (China) Wang Qiang (quarterfinals; retired)
5. (United States) Alexa Glatch (first round; retired)
6. (Japan) Misa Eguchi (first round)
7. (China) Zhang Shuai (champion)
8. (Japan) Eri Hozumi (first round)

== Main draw ==
Key

- Q = Qualifier
- WC = Wild card
- LL = Lucky loser
- Alt = Alternate
- ITF = ITF entry
- PR = Protected ranking
- SR = Special ranking
- SE = Special exempt
- JE = Junior exempt
- JR = Junior Accelerator Programme entrant
- CO = College Accelerator Programme entrant
- NG = Next Gen Accelerator Program entrant
- w/o = Walkover
- r = Retired
- d = Defaulted

=== Finals ===
Semifinals
1	(Japan) Nao Hibino	6	1	7
3	(Chinese Taipei) Hsieh Su-wei	1	6	5
7	(China) Zhang Shuai	2	6	6
2	(Japan) Kurumi Nara	6	1	3

Final
1	(Japan) Nao Hibino	4	1
7	(China) Zhang Shuai	6	6

=== Top half ===
First round
1	(Japan) N Hibino	6	6
LL	(Japan) Y Higuchi	3	2
(Japan) K Okamura	6	5	5
WC	(Japan) Y Tanaka	0	7	7
(Croatia) J Fett	5	6	6
WC	(Japan) M Minokoshi	7	2	0
Q	(Japan) S Akita	6	6
8	(Japan) E Hozumi	1	2
3	(Chinese Taipei) S-w Hsieh	7^{7}	4	6
LL	(Japan) M Osaka	6^{4}	6	2
Q	(Japan) A Yoshitomi	6	0	6
(Japan) S Aoyama	3	6	4
(South Korea) S-r Lee	3	6	1
(Japan) E Sema	6	3	6
(Japan) A Okuno	7	0
5	(United States) A Glatch	5	0^{r}

Second round
1	(Japan) N Hibino	6	6
WC	(Japan) Y Tanaka	3	3
(Croatia) J Fett	6	2	4
Q	(Japan) S Akita	0	6	6
3	(Chinese Taipei) S-w Hsieh	6	6
Q	(Japan) A Yoshitomi	1	1
(Japan) E Sema	6	1	3
(Japan) A Okuno	3	6	6

Quarterfinals
1	(Japan) N Hibino	1	6	2
Q	(Japan) S Akita	6	3	0^{r}
3	(Chinese Taipei) S-w Hsieh	7	6
(Japan) A Okuno	5	3

Semifinals
1	(Japan) N Hibino	6	1	7
3	(Chinese Taipei) S-w Hsieh	1	6	5

=== Bottom half ===
First round
7	(China) S Zhang	6	6
Q	(Japan) A Inoue	2	4
(Italy) M Caregaro	4	4
(Japan) M Hibi	6	6
WC	(Japan) M Miyamura	3	4
(South Korea) S-j Jang	6	6
Q	(Spain) C Sánchez Quintanar	2	6^{8}
4	(China) Q Wang	6	7^{10}
6	(Japan) M Eguchi	6^{6}	6^{9}
(Georgia (country)) S Shapatava	7^{8}	7^{11}
(Japan) M Ninomiya	1	1
(Thailand) V Wongteanchai	6	6
(China) Y Xu	1	1
(South Korea) N-l Han	6	6
WC	(Japan) A Omae	2	1
2	(Japan) K Nara	6	6

Second round
7	(China) S Zhang	6	6
(Japan) M Hibi	2	0
(South Korea) S-j Jang	1	4
4	(China) Q Wang	6	6
(Georgia (country)) S Shapatava	4	3
(Thailand) V Wongteanchai	6	6
(South Korea) N-l Han	3	2
2	(Japan) K Nara	6	6

Quarterfinals
7	(China) S Zhang	3	6	2
4	(China) Q Wang	6	4	1^{r}
(Thailand) V Wongteanchai	0	0
2	(Japan) K Nara	6	6

Semifinals
7	(China) S Zhang	2	6	6
2	(Japan) K Nara	6	1	3
