= 2016 Ando Securities Open – Doubles =

Doubles
- 2016 Ando Securities Open

Final
- Champions: (Japan) Rika Fujiwara (Japan) Yuki Naito
- Runners-up: (United States) Jamie Loeb (Belgium) An-Sophie Mestach
- Score: 6–4, 6–7^{(12–14)}, [10–8]

Events
Singles	Doubles
← 2015 ·	Ando Securities Open	· 2017 →

Shuko Aoyama and Makoto Ninomiya were the defending champions, but lost in the first round.

Rika Fujiwara and Yuki Naito won the title, defeating Jamie Loeb and An-Sophie Mestach in the final, 6–4, 6–7^{(12–14)}, [10–8].

== Seeds ==
1. (Japan) Eri Hozumi / (Japan) Miyu Kato (first round)
2. (Japan) Shuko Aoyama / (Japan) Makoto Ninomiya (first round)
3. (United Kingdom) Naomi Broady / (Germany) Tatjana Maria (quarterfinals)
4. (Australia) Jessica Moore / (Thailand) Varatchaya Wongteanchai (semifinals)

== Draw ==
=== Key ===
- Q = Qualifier
- WC = Wild card
- LL = Lucky loser
- Alt = Alternate
- SE = Special exempt
- PR = Protected ranking
- ITF = ITF entry
- JE = Junior exempt
- w/o = Walkover
- r = Retired
- d = Defaulted
- SR = Special ranking

First round
1	(Japan) E Hozumi (Japan) M Kato	3	5
(Uzbekistan) N Abduraimova (Russia) K Lykina	6	7
(Thailand) Pe Plipuech (Japan) Y Tanaka	3	3
WC	(Japan) R Fujiwara (Japan) Y Naito	6	6
3	(United Kingdom) N Broady (Germany) T Maria	6	6
(Japan) A Okuno (Turkey) İ Soylu	4	4
WC	(Japan) E Hayashi (Japan) R Kajitani	4	6^{2}
(Japan) N Hibino (Japan) A Omae	6	7^{7}
Q	(Thailand) K Buayam (Chinese Taipei) Y-h Lee	2	1
Q	(Thailand) L Kumkhum (Thailand) N Lertpitaksinchai	6	6
(Japan) H Kuwata (Poland) K Piter	3	4
4	(Australia) J Moore (Thailand) Vara Wongteanchai	6	6
(United States) J Loeb (Belgium) A-S Mestach	6	6
WC	(Japan) M Hibi (Japan) M Imanishi	1	2
(Serbia) N Stojanović (Romania) PM Țig	1	6	[10]
2	(Japan) S Aoyama (Japan) M Ninomiya	6	1	[6]

Quarterfinals
(Uzbekistan) N Abduraimova (Russia) K Lykina	2	6	[6]
WC	(Japan) R Fujiwara (Japan) Y Naito	6	4	[10]
3	(United Kingdom) N Broady (Germany) T Maria	2	7^{7}	[11]
(Japan) N Hibino (Japan) A Omae	6	6^{2}	[13]
Q	(Thailand) L Kumkhum (Thailand) N Lertpitaksinchai	1	7^{7}	[5]
4	(Australia) J Moore (Thailand) Vara Wongteanchai	6	6^{4}	[10]
(United States) J Loeb (Belgium) A-S Mestach	3	6	[10]
(Serbia) N Stojanović (Romania) PM Țig	6	0	[7]

Semifinals
WC	(Japan) R Fujiwara (Japan) Y Naito	6	6
(Japan) N Hibino (Japan) A Omae	3	4
4	(Australia) J Moore (Thailand) Vara Wongteanchai	6^{4}	4
(United States) J Loeb (Belgium) A-S Mestach	7^{7}	6

Final
WC	(Japan) R Fujiwara (Japan) Y Naito	6	6^{12}	[10]
(United States) J Loeb (Belgium) A-S Mestach	4	7^{14}	[8]
