= 2015 Ando Securities Open – Doubles =

Doubles
- 2015 Ando Securities Open

Final
- Champions: (Japan) Shuko Aoyama (Japan) Makoto Ninomiya
- Runners-up: (Japan) Eri Hozumi (Japan) Kurumi Nara
- Score: 3–6, 6–2, [10–7]

Events
Singles	Doubles
← 2014 ·	Ando Securities Open	· 2016 →

This was a new event on the ITF Women's Circuit.

Shuko Aoyama and Makoto Ninomiya won the inaugural event, defeating Eri Hozumi and Kurumi Nara in an all-Japanese final, 3–6, 6–2, [10–7].

== Seeds ==
1. (Japan) Shuko Aoyama / (Japan) Makoto Ninomiya (champions)
2. (Japan) Eri Hozumi / (Japan) Kurumi Nara (final)
3. (Japan) Nao Hibino / (United Kingdom) Emily Webley-Smith (quarterfinals)
4. (Japan) Ayaka Okuno / (China) Xu Yifan (first round)

== Draw ==
=== Key ===
- Q = Qualifier
- WC = Wild card
- LL = Lucky loser
- Alt = Alternate
- SE = Special exempt
- PR = Protected ranking
- ITF = ITF entry
- JE = Junior exempt
- w/o = Walkover
- r = Retired
- d = Defaulted
- SR = Special ranking

First round
1	(Japan) S Aoyama (Japan) M Ninomiya	6	7
(Thailand) N Lertcheewakarn (Japan) E Sema	2	5
WC	(Japan) R Kajitani (Japan) A Yoshitomi	4	6	[10]
(Japan) M Ayukawa (Japan) R Sawayanagi	6	4	[5]
4	(Japan) A Okuno (China) Y Xu	6	5	[6]
(South Korea) N-l Han (South Korea) S-r Lee	4	7	[10]
Q	(Japan) N Hanatani (Japan) M Miyahara	1	3
(Russia) K Lykina (Georgia (country)) S Shapatava	6	6
WC	(Japan) S Akita (Japan) A Inoue	5	6	[12]
(Romania) E Bogdan (Croatia) J Fett	7	0	[10]
(Japan) M Miyamura (Thailand) V Wongteanchai	4	0
3	(Japan) N Hibino (United Kingdom) E Webley-Smith	6	6
WC	(United States) Y Chiang (Japan) Y Saigo	6	2	[4]
(South Korea) J-h Choi (South Korea) S-j Jang	3	6	[10]
Q	(Argentina) T Búa (Spain) C Sánchez Quintanar	6^{3}	1
2	(Japan) E Hozumi (Japan) K Nara	7^{7}	6

Quarterfinals
1	(Japan) S Aoyama (Japan) M Ninomiya	7^{7}	6
WC	(Japan) R Kajitani (Japan) A Yoshitomi	6^{3}	2
(South Korea) N-l Han (South Korea) S-r Lee	7	6
(Russia) K Lykina (Georgia (country)) S Shapatava	5	2
WC	(Japan) S Akita (Japan) A Inoue	6	6
3	(Japan) N Hibino (United Kingdom) E Webley-Smith	3	4
(South Korea) J-h Choi (South Korea) S-j Jang	3	1
2	(Japan) E Hozumi (Japan) K Nara	6	6

Semifinals
1	(Japan) S Aoyama (Japan) M Ninomiya	6	6
(South Korea) N-l Han (South Korea) S-r Lee	4	3
WC	(Japan) S Akita (Japan) A Inoue	2	6^{2}
2	(Japan) E Hozumi (Japan) K Nara	6	7^{7}

Final
1	(Japan) S Aoyama (Japan) M Ninomiya	3	6	[10]
2	(Japan) E Hozumi (Japan) K Nara	6	2	[7]
