= 2017 Ando Securities Open – Doubles =

Doubles
- 2017 Ando Securities Open

Final
- Champion: (Japan) Rika Fujiwara (Japan) Yuki Naito
- Runner-up: (Japan) Eri Hozumi (Japan) Junri Namigata
- Score: 6–1, 6–3

Events
Singles	Doubles
← 2016 ·	Ando Securities Open	· 2019 →

Rika Fujiwara and Yuki Naito were the defending champions and successfully defended their title after defeating Eri Hozumi and Junri Namigata 6–1, 6–3 in the final.

== Seeds ==
1. (Japan) Eri Hozumi / (Japan) Junri Namigata (final)
2. (Japan) Makoto Ninomiya / (Japan) Riko Sawayanagi (semifinals)
3. (Japan) Ayano Shimizu / (Japan) Kotomi Takahata (first round)
4. (Japan) Rika Fujiwara / (Japan) Yuki Naito (champions)

== Draw ==
=== Key ===
- Q = Qualifier
- WC = Wild card
- LL = Lucky loser
- Alt = Alternate
- SE = Special exempt
- PR = Protected ranking
- ITF = ITF entry
- JE = Junior exempt
- w/o = Walkover
- r = Retired
- d = Defaulted
- SR = Special ranking

First round
1	(Japan) E Hozumi (Japan) J Namigata	6	6
Q	(Japan) AO Kajuru (Japan) M Uchijima	2	3
WC	(Japan) N Fujioka (Japan) Y Saigo	5	6	[10]
WC	(Japan) C Hosonuma (Japan) M Miyahara	7	1	[6]
3	(Japan) A Shimizu (Japan) K Takahata	1	4
(Japan) M Imanishi (Japan) M Kobori	6	6
(China) J Kang (Hong Kong) L Zhang	1	3
(South Korea) J-h Choi (Japan) M Ozeki	6	6
Q	(Japan) N Hanatani (Japan) A Yoshitomi	2	6	[6]
WC	(Japan) H Kaji (Japan) Y Tanaka	6	4	[10]
(Romania) M Buzărnescu (Hungary) D Gálfi	6	5	[7]
4	(Japan) R Fujiwara (Japan) Y Naito	1	7	[10]
(Italy) G Brescia (Hungary) Á Bukta	4	3
(Japan) A Inoue (Japan) M Inoue	6	6
(South Korea) S-j Jang (South Korea) N-r Kim	4	3
2	(Japan) M Ninomiya (Japan) R Sawayanagi	6	6

Quarterfinals
1	(Japan) E Hozumi (Japan) J Namigata	6	6
WC	(Japan) N Fujioka (Japan) Y Saigo	3	2
(Japan) M Imanishi (Japan) M Kobori	7	1	[9]
(South Korea) J-h Choi (Japan) M Ozeki	5	6	[11]
WC	(Japan) H Kaji (Japan) Y Tanaka	6	0	[7]
4	(Japan) R Fujiwara (Japan) Y Naito	4	6	[10]
(Japan) A Inoue (Japan) M Inoue	5	4
2	(Japan) M Ninomiya (Japan) R Sawayanagi	7	6

Semifinals
1	(Japan) E Hozumi (Japan) J Namigata	7^{10}	7
(South Korea) J-h Choi (Japan) M Ozeki	6^{8}	5
4	(Japan) R Fujiwara (Japan) Y Naito	6	7^{7}
2	(Japan) M Ninomiya (Japan) R Sawayanagi	4	6^{3}

Final
1	(Japan) E Hozumi (Japan) J Namigata	1	3
4	(Japan) R Fujiwara (Japan) Y Naito	6	6
