= 2019 Ando Securities Open – Singles =

Singles
- 2019 Ando Securities Open

Final
- Champion: (China) Zhang Shuai
- Runner-up: (Italy) Jasmine Paolini
- Score: 6–3, 7–5

Events
| Singles | Doubles |
- Ando Securities Open

Zhang Shuai was a three-time defending champion, having won the previous editions from 2015 to 2017 and successfully defended her title, defeating Jasmine Paolini in the final, 6–3, 7–5.

== Seeds ==
1. (China) Zhang Shuai (champion)
2. (China) Peng Shuai (semifinals, retired)
3. (China) Zhu Lin (withdrew)
4. (Germany) Tatjana Maria (semifinals)
5. (Japan) Nao Hibino (quarterfinals)
6. (Italy) Jasmine Paolini (final)
7. (Japan) Kurumi Nara (quarterfinals, retired)
8. (China) Wang Xinyu (quarterfinals)

== Draw ==
Key

- Q = Qualifier
- WC = Wild card
- LL = Lucky loser
- Alt = Alternate
- ITF = ITF entry
- PR = Protected ranking
- SR = Special ranking
- SE = Special exempt
- JE = Junior exempt
- JR = Junior Accelerator Programme entrant
- CO = College Accelerator Programme entrant
- NG = Next Gen Accelerator Program entrant
- w/o = Walkover
- r = Retired
- d = Defaulted

=== Finals ===
Semifinals
1 | (China) Zhang Shuai | 6 | 6
4 | (Germany) Tatjana Maria | 0 | 3
6 | (Italy) Jasmine Paolini | 6 | 0
2 | (China) Peng Shuai | 4 | 0^{r}

Final
1 | (China) Zhang Shuai | 6 | 7
6 | (Italy) Jasmine Paolini | 3 | 5

=== Top half ===
First round
1 | (China) S Zhang | 6 | 6
(Japan) J Namigata | 0 | 1
(China) X You | 6 | 6
Q | (United States) N Cheong | 2 | 0
WC | (Japan) YL Miyazaki | 3 | 4
Q | (Japan) M Ninomiya | 6 | 6
(China) S Xu | 3 | 6 | 1
5 | (Japan) N Hibino | 6 | 4 | 6
4 | (Germany) T Maria | 6 | 6
(South Africa) C Simmonds | 3 | 3
Q | (Japan) E Hozumi | 6 | 4 | 0
(China) F Liu | 2 | 6 | 6
WC | (Japan) M Minokoshi | 5 | 4
WC | (Japan) Y Tanaka | 7 | 6
Q | (Japan) E Hayashi | 5 | 3
8 | (China) Xin Wang | 7 | 6

Second round
1 | (China) S Zhang | 6 | 6
(China) X You | 4 | 2
Q | (Japan) M Ninomiya | 0^{r}
5 | (Japan) N Hibino | 4
4 | (Germany) T Maria | 6 | 6
(China) F Liu | 2 | 0
WC | (Japan) Y Tanaka | 2 | 0
8 | (China) Xin Wang | 6 | 6

Quarterfinals
1 | (China) S Zhang | 6 | 6
5 | (Japan) N Hibino | 3 | 3
4 | (Germany) T Maria | 6 | 6
8 | (China) Xin Wang | 3 | 4

Semifinals
1 | (China) S Zhang | 6 | 6
4 | (Germany) T Maria | 0 | 3

=== Bottom half ===
First round
6 | (Italy) J Paolini | 6 | 6
Q | (Japan) M Hontama | 2 | 2
(Japan) H Kaji | 1 | 2
WC | (Japan) A Morita | 6 | 6
(China) X Han | 6 | 6
(South Korea) D-b Kim | 3 | 1
(Serbia) N Kostić | 6 | 6
LL | (Japan) R Ushijima | 2 | 4
7 | (Japan) K Nara | 6 | 6
(South Korea) S-j Jang | 3 | 4
(Japan) A Shimizu | 5 | 4
(South Korea) N-l Han | 7 | 6
Q | (Japan) N Hanatani | 6 | 6
(Japan) M Imanishi | 2 | 0
(Japan) Y Naito | 2 | 0^{r}
2 | (China) S Peng | 6 | 3

Second round
6 | (Italy) J Paolini | 7 | 6
WC | (Japan) A Morita | 5 | 4
(China) X Han | 7 | 6
(Serbia) N Kostić | 5 | 3
7 | (Japan) K Nara | 6^{6} | 6 | 6
(South Korea) N-l Han | 7^{8} | 2 | 1
Q | (Japan) N Hanatani | 4 | 4
2 | (China) S Peng | 6 | 6

Quarterfinals
6 | (Italy) J Paolini | 6 | 7^{7}
(China) X Han | 2 | 6^{2}
7 | (Japan) K Nara | 0^{r}
2 | (China) S Peng | 5

Semifinals
6 | (Italy) J Paolini | 6 | 0
2 | (China) S Peng | 4 | 0^{r}
