= 2015 Ando Securities Open =

Tennis event

- Date: 16–22 November
- Edition: 1st
- Category: ITF Women's Circuit
- Prize money: $100,000
- Surface: Hard
- Location: Ariake, Tokyo, Japan

Champions

Singles
- (China) Zhang Shuai

Doubles
- (Japan) Shuko Aoyama / (Japan) Makoto Ninomiya
- Ando Securities Open

The 2015 Ando Securities Open was a professional tennis tournament played on outdoor hard courts. It was the first edition of the tournament and part of the 2015 ITF Women's Circuit, offering a total of $100,000 in prize money. It took place in Ariake, Tokyo, Japan, on 16–22 November 2015.

== Singles main draw entrants ==
=== Seeds ===
Country	Player	Rank^{1}	Seed
JPN	Nao Hibino	78	1
JPN	Kurumi Nara	83	2
TPE	Hsieh Su-wei	107	3
CHN	Wang Qiang	114	4
USA	Alexa Glatch	137	5
JPN	Misa Eguchi	181	6
CHN	Zhang Shuai	186	7
JPN	Eri Hozumi	193	8

- ^{1} Rankings as of 9 November 2015.

=== Other entrants ===
The following players received wildcards into the singles main draw:

- (Japan) Mai Minokoshi
- (Japan) Miki Miyamura
- (Japan) Akiko Omae
- (Japan) Yuuki Tanaka

The following players received entry from the qualifying draw:

- (Japan) Shiho Akita
- (Japan) Akari Inoue
- (Spain) Cristina Sánchez Quintanar
- (Japan) Aiko Yoshitomi

The following players received entry by a lucky loser spot:

- (Japan) Yuka Higuchi
- (Japan) Mari Osaka

== Champions ==
=== Singles ===
- (China) Zhang Shuai def. (Japan) Nao Hibino, 6–4, 6–1

=== Doubles ===
- (Japan) Shuko Aoyama / (Japan) Makoto Ninomiya def. (Japan) Eri Hozumi / (Japan) Kurumi Nara, 3–6, 6–2, [10–7]
