= 2019 Ando Securities Open =

- Date: 11–17 November 2019
- Edition: 4th
- Category: ITF Women's World Tennis Tour
- Prize money: $100,000
- Surface: Hard
- Location: Tokyo, Japan

Champions

Singles
- (China) Zhang Shuai

Doubles
- (South Korea) Choi Ji-hee / (South Korea) Han Na-lae
- Ando Securities Open

The 2019 Ando Securities Open was a professional tennis tournament played on outdoor hard courts. It was the fourth edition of the tournament which was part of the 2019 ITF Women's World Tennis Tour. It took place in Tokyo, Japan between 11 and 17 November 2019.

== Singles main-draw entrants ==
=== Seeds ===
| Country | Player | Rank^{1} | Seed |
|---|---|---|---|
| CHN | Zhang Shuai | 46 | 1 |
| CHN | Peng Shuai | 75 | 2 |
| ~~CHN~~ | ~~Zhu Lin~~ | ~~83~~ | ~~3~~ |
| GER | Tatjana Maria | 90 | 4 |
| JPN | Nao Hibino | 102 | 5 |
| ITA | Jasmine Paolini | 117 | 6 |
| JPN | Kurumi Nara | 144 | 7 |
| CHN | Wang Xinyu | 150 | 8 |

- ^{1} Rankings are as of 4 November 2019.

=== Other entrants ===
The following players received wildcards into the singles main draw:

- (Japan) Mai Minokoshi
- (Japan) Yuriko Lily Miyazaki
- (Japan) Ayumi Morita
- (Japan) Yuuki Tanaka

The following players received entry from the qualifying draw:

- (United States) Naomi Cheong
- (Japan) Nagi Hanatani
- (Japan) Erina Hayashi
- (Japan) Mai Hontama
- (Japan) Eri Hozumi
- (Japan) Makoto Ninomiya

The following player received entry as a lucky loser:

- (Japan) Risa Ushijima

== Champions ==
=== Singles ===
- (China) Zhang Shuai def. (Italy) Jasmine Paolini, 6–3, 7–5

=== Doubles ===
- (South Korea) Choi Ji-hee / (South Korea) Han Na-lae def. (Japan) Haruka Kaji / (Japan) Junri Namigata, 6–3, 6–3
