= 2022 ACT Clay Court International 1 – Doubles =

Doubles
- 2022 ACT Clay Court International 1

Final
- Champions: (South Korea) Han Na-lae (South Korea) Jang Su-jeong
- Runners-up: (Japan) Yuki Naito (Japan) Moyuka Uchijima
- Score: 3–6, 6–2, [10–5]

Events
Singles	Doubles
← 2019 ·	ACT Clay Court International	· 2023 →

Naiktha Bains and Tereza Mihalíková were the defending champions but Mihalíková chose not to participate. Bains played alongside Mihaela Buzărnescu, but lost in the first round to Han Na-lae and Jang Su-jeong.

Han and Jang went on to win the title, defeating Yuki Naito and Moyuka Uchijima in the final, 3–6, 6–2, [10–5].

== Seeds ==
1. (Indonesia) Beatrice Gumulya / (Indonesia) Jessy Rompies (semifinals)
2. (Australia) Destanee Aiava / (Australia) Olivia Tjandramulia (first round)
3. (India) Rutuja Bhosale / (India) Ankita Raina (semifinals)
4. (United Kingdom) Naiktha Bains / (Romania) Mihaela Buzărnescu (first round)

== Draw ==
=== Key ===
- Q = Qualifier
- WC = Wild card
- LL = Lucky loser
- Alt = Alternate
- SE = Special exempt
- PR = Protected ranking
- ITF = ITF entry
- JE = Junior exempt
- w/o = Walkover
- r = Retired
- d = Defaulted
- SR = Special ranking

=== Draw ===
First round
1	(Indonesia) B Gumulya (Indonesia) J Rompies	7	7^{8}
(United States) K Day (United States) S Vickery	5	6^{6}
(South Korea) J-h Choi (Japan) K Okamura	6	6
(China) Jia Lu (Japan) C Muramatsu	4	4
4	(United Kingdom) N Bains (Romania) M Buzărnescu	0	1
(South Korea) N-l Han (South Korea) S-j Jang	6	6
(Croatia) J Fett (Australia) Ar Rodionova	7	6
(Japan) H Kuwata (Japan) A Omae	5	3
(Japan) N Hanatani (Japan) E Sema	6	7^{7}
(Australia) K Birrell (Australia) G Da Silva-Fick	4	6^{4}
(Australia) A Bozovic (Australia) A Osborne	3	4
3	(India) R Bhosale (India) A Raina	6	6
(Australia) J Fourlis (Australia) A Smith	3	2
(Japan) Y Naito (Japan) M Uchijima	6	6
(Mexico) F Contreras (Australia) A Myers	3	7^{8}	[10]
2	(Australia) D Aiava (Australia) O Tjandramulia	6	6^{6}	[4]

Quarterfinals
1	(Indonesia) B Gumulya (Indonesia) J Rompies	7^{7}	6
(South Korea) J-h Choi (Japan) K Okamura	6^{2}	0
(South Korea) N-l Han (South Korea) S-j Jang	6	7
(Croatia) J Fett (Australia) Ar Rodionova	2	5
(Japan) N Hanatani (Japan) E Sema	2	5
3	(India) R Bhosale (India) A Raina	6	7
(Japan) Y Naito (Japan) M Uchijima	6	6
(Mexico) F Contreras (Australia) A Myers	2	1

Semifinals
1	(Indonesia) B Gumulya (Indonesia) J Rompies	6	3	[6]
(South Korea) N-l Han (South Korea) S-j Jang	3	6	[10]
3	(India) R Bhosale (India) A Raina	3	6^{3}
(Japan) Y Naito (Japan) M Uchijima	6	7^{7}

Final
(South Korea) N-l Han (South Korea) S-j Jang	3	6	[10]
(Japan) Y Naito (Japan) M Uchijima	6	2	[5]
