= 2022 Ando Securities Open – Doubles =

Doubles
- 2022 Ando Securities Open

Final
- Champions: (Chinese Taipei) Hsieh Yu-chieh (Indonesia) Jessy Rompies
- Runners-up: (Japan) Mai Hontama (Japan) Junri Namigata
- Score: 6–4, 6–3

Events
| Singles | Doubles |
- Ando Securities Open

Choi Ji-hee and Han Na-lae were the defending champions, but Choi chose not to participate. Han partnered alongside Lee Ya-hsuan, but they lost in the first round to Hiromi Abe and Riko Sawayanagi.

Hsieh Yu-chieh and Jessy Rompies won the title, defeating Mai Hontama and Junri Namigata in the final, 6–4, 6–3.

== Seeds ==
1. (Chinese Taipei) Hsieh Yu-chieh / (Indonesia) Jessy Rompies (champions)
2. (South Korea) Han Na-lae / (Chinese Taipei) Lee Ya-hsuan (first round)
3. (India) Rutuja Bhosale / (Japan) Erika Sema (first round)
4. (Japan) Kyōka Okamura / (Thailand) Peangtarn Plipuech (quarterfinals)

== Draw ==
Key

- Q = Qualifier
- WC = Wild card
- LL = Lucky loser
- Alt = Alternate
- ITF = ITF entry
- PR = Protected ranking
- SR = Special ranking
- SE = Special exempt
- JE = Junior exempt
- JR = Junior Accelerator Programme entrant
- CO = College Accelerator Programme entrant
- NG = Next Gen Accelerator Program entrant
- w/o = Walkover
- r = Retired
- d = Defaulted

=== Draw ===
First round
1 | (Chinese Taipei) Y-c Hsieh (Indonesia) J Rompies | 6 | 7^{7}
(Japan) M Kawamura (Japan) F Kozaki | 1 | 6^{5}
(Japan) S Hosogi (Japan) H Sakatsume | 1 | 3
(Japan) E Hayashi (Japan) K Morisaki | 6 | 6
3 | (India) R Bhosale (Japan) E Sema | 5 | 6 | [3]
(Japan) C Muramatsu (Japan) N Sato | 7 | 4 | [10]
WC | (Japan) A Ito (Japan) K Kubo | 6 | 6
WC | (Japan) N Katsumi (Japan) S Saito | 3 | 3
(Japan) N Kawagishi (Japan) R Ueda | 6 | 7^{8}
(Japan) R Saigo (Japan) Y Saigo | 3 | 6^{6}
(Japan) M Kobori (Thailand) L Kumkhum | 5 | 3
4 | (Japan) K Okamura (Thailand) P Plipuech | 7 | 6
(Japan) M Ayukawa (Japan) E Shimizu | 6^{2} | 1
(Japan) M Hontama (Japan) J Namigata | 7^{7} | 6
WC | (Japan) H Abe (Japan) R Sawayanagi | 6 | 6
2 | (South Korea) N-l Han (Chinese Taipei) Y-h Lee | 3 | 4

Quarterfinals
1 | (Chinese Taipei) Y-c Hsieh (Indonesia) J Rompies | 6 | 7^{7}
(Japan) E Hayashi (Japan) K Morisaki | 4 | 6^{3}
(Japan) C Muramatsu (Japan) N Sato | 6 | 6
WC | (Japan) A Ito (Japan) K Kubo | 4 | 1
(Japan) N Kawagishi (Japan) R Ueda | 7 | 1 | [10]
4 | (Japan) K Okamura (Thailand) P Plipuech | 5 | 6 | [7]
(Japan) M Hontama (Japan) J Namigata | 6 | 6
WC | (Japan) H Abe (Japan) R Sawayanagi | 3 | 3

Semifinals
1 | (Chinese Taipei) Y-c Hsieh (Indonesia) J Rompies | 3 | 6 | [10]
(Japan) C Muramatsu (Japan) N Sato | 6 | 3 | [6]
(Japan) N Kawagishi (Japan) R Ueda | 5 | 3
(Japan) M Hontama (Japan) J Namigata | 7 | 6

Final
1 | (Chinese Taipei) Y-c Hsieh (Indonesia) J Rompies | 6 | 6
(Japan) M Hontama (Japan) J Namigata | 4 | 3
