= ITF Tokyo Ariake Open =

Ando Securities Open
- 2026 Ando Securities Open

Women's World Tennis Tour
- Event name: Ando Securities Open
- Location: Ariake, Tokyo, Japan
- Venue: Ariake Tennis Forest Park
- Category: ITF Women's Circuit
- Surface: Hard
- Draw: 32S/32Q/16D
- Prize money: $100,000
- Website: ando-sec-open.com

The Ando Securities Open is a tournament for professional tennis players played on outdoor hardcourts. The event is classified as a $100,000 ITF Women's Circuit tournament and has been held at Ariake Coliseum in Ariake, Tokyo, Japan, since 2015.

== Past finals ==
=== Singles ===
| Year | Champion | Runner-up | Score |
|---|---|---|---|
| 2026 | (Australia) Taylah Preston | (Thailand) Lanlana Tararudee | 6–1, 4–6, 6–4 |
| 2025 | (Japan) Wakana Sonobe | (Japan) Ena Shibahara | 6–4, 6–7^{(7–1)}, 6–3 |
| 2024 | (Australia) Maddison Inglis | (Japan) Ena Shibahara | 6–4, 3–6, 6–2 |
| 2023 | (Switzerland) Viktorija Golubic | (China) Wang Xiyu | 6–4, 3–6, 6–4 |
| 2022 | (China) Wang Xinyu | (Japan) Moyuka Uchijima | 6–1, 4–6, 6–3 |
| 2020–21 | Tournament cancelled due to the COVID-19 pandemic | | |
| 2019 | (China) Zhang Shuai (4) | (Italy) Jasmine Paolini | 6–3, 7–5 |
| 2018 | Not held | | |
| 2017 | (China) Zhang Shuai (3) | (Romania) Mihaela Buzărnescu | 6–4, 6–0 |
| 2016 | (China) Zhang Shuai (2) | (Hungary) Dalma Gálfi | 4–6, 7–6^{(7–2)}, 6–2 |
| 2015 | (China) Zhang Shuai | (Japan) Nao Hibino | 6–4, 6–1 |

=== Doubles ===
| Year | Champions | Runners-up | Score |
|---|---|---|---|
| 2026 | (Australia) Alexandra Osborne (Hong Kong) Cody Wong | (Hong Kong) Eudice Chong (Chinese Taipei) Liang En-shuo | 3–6, 7–5, [10–7] |
| 2025 | (China) Guo Hanyu (Japan) Ena Shibahara | (Thailand) Mananchaya Sawangkaew (Thailand) Lanlana Tararudee | 5–7, 7–6^{(7–1)}, [10–5] |
| 2024 | (Australia) Kimberly Birrell (South Korea) Jang Su-jeong | (Serbia) Aleksandra Krunić (Australia) Arina Rodionova | 7–5, 3–6, [10–8] |
| 2023 | (France) Jessika Ponchet (Netherlands) Bibiane Schoofs | (United Kingdom) Alicia Barnett (United Kingdom) Olivia Nicholls | 4–6, 6–1, [10–7] |
| 2022 | (Chinese Taipei) Hsieh Yu-chieh (Indonesia) Jessy Rompies | (Japan) Mai Hontama (Japan) Junri Namigata | 6–4, 6–3 |
| 2020–21 | Tournament cancelled due to the COVID-19 pandemic | | |
| 2019 | (South Korea) Choi Ji-hee (South Korea) Han Na-lae | (Japan) Haruka Kaji (Japan) Junri Namigata | 6–3, 6–3 |
| 2018 | Not held | | |
| 2017 | (Japan) Rika Fujiwara (2) (Japan) Yuki Naito (2) | (Japan) Eri Hozumi (Japan) Junri Namigata | 6–1, 6–3 |
| 2016 | (Japan) Rika Fujiwara (Japan) Yuki Naito | (United States) Jamie Loeb (Belgium) An-Sophie Mestach | 6–4, 6–7^{(12–14)}, [10–8] |
| 2015 | (Japan) Shuko Aoyama (Japan) Makoto Ninomiya | (Japan) Eri Hozumi (Japan) Kurumi Nara | 3–6, 6–2, [10–7] |
