= Yuki Naito =

Japanese tennis player (born 2001)

Yuki Naito 内藤 祐希
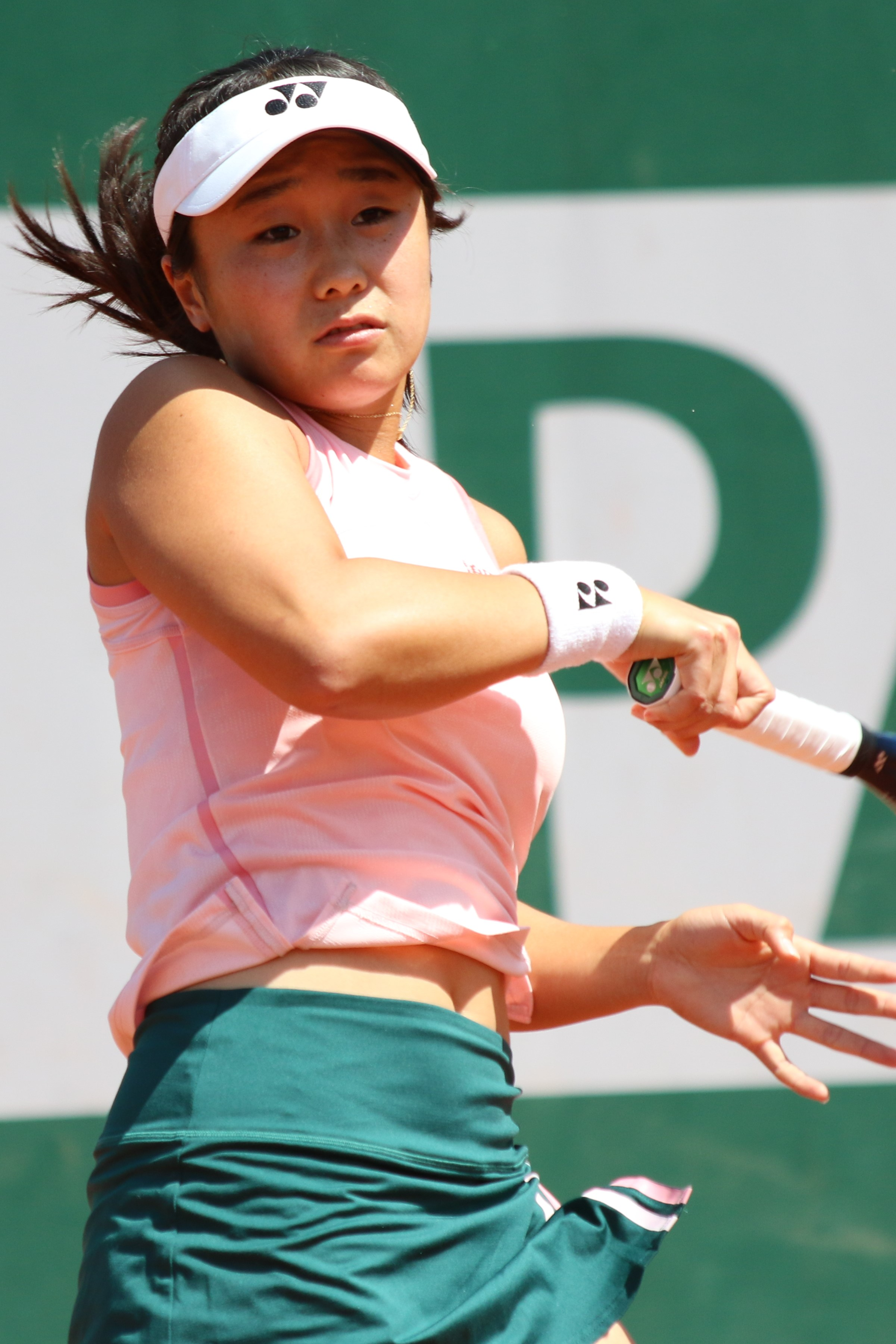
- Naito at the 2022 French Open
- Country (sports): Japan
- Born: 16 February 2001 (age 25) Niigata, Japan
- Height: 1.63 m (5 ft 4 in)
- Plays: Right (two-handed backhand)
- Prize money: $457,654

Singles
- Career record: 259–191
- Career titles: 7 ITF
- Highest ranking: No. 169 (5 April 2021)
- Current ranking: No. 239 (16 November 2026)

Grand Slam singles results
- Australian Open: Q2 (2020, 2021)
- French Open: Q3 (2022)
- Wimbledon: Q1 (2022)
- US Open: Q2 (2021)

Doubles
- Career record: 121–76
- Career titles: 11 ITF
- Highest ranking: No. 224 (13 August 2018)
- Current ranking: No. 585 (16 November 2026)
- Last updated on: 21 November 2026.

Yuki Naito (内藤 祐希, Naitō Yūki; born 16 February 2001) is a Japanese tennis player. Naito has been ranked as high as world No. 169 in singles and No. 224 in doubles by the Women's Tennis Association (WTA).

On the ITF Junior Circuit, Naito's career-high ranking was world No. 15.

== Career ==
In November 2016, she won the doubles tournament of the Ando Securities Open in Tokyo, partnering Rika Fujiwara. The pair defended their title the following year.

Naito made her WTA Tour main-draw debut as a qualifier at the 2021 Winners Open in Romania.

== Performance timeline ==
Key
W	F	SF	QF	#R	RR	Q#	DNQ	A	NH

(W) winner; (F) finalist; (SF) semifinalist; (QF) quarterfinalist; (#R) rounds 4, 3, 2, 1; (RR) round-robin stage; (Q#) qualification round; (DNQ) did not qualify; (A) absent; (NH) not held; (SR) strike rate (events won / competed); (W–L) win–loss record.
To avoid confusion and double counting, these charts are updated at the conclusion of a tournament or when the player's participation has ended.

Only main-draw results in WTA Tour, Grand Slam tournaments, Fed Cup/Billie Jean King Cup and Olympic Games are included in win–loss records.

=== Singles ===
Current through the 2023 Australian Open.

Tournament	2020	2021	2022	2023	SR	W–L
Grand Slam tournaments
Australian Open	Q2	Q2	Q1	Q1	0 / 0	0–0
French Open	Q2	Q1	Q3	A	0 / 0	0–0
Wimbledon	NH	A	Q1	A	0 / 0	0–0
US Open	A	Q2	Q1	A	0 / 0	0–0
Win–Loss	0–0	0–0	0–0	0–0	0 / 0	0–0
Career statistics
Tournaments	0	1	1	0	Career total: 2	
Overall win-loss	0–0	0–3	0–1	0–0	0 / 2	0–4
Year-end ranking	184	257	220	369	$326,468	

== ITF Circuit finals ==
=== Singles: 17 (7 titles, 10 runner-ups) ===
Legend W100 tournaments (1–0) W60/75 tournaments (0–3) W25 tournaments (4–3) W15 tournaments (2–4)	Finals by surface Hard (2–3) Clay (5–6) Carpet (0–1)

Result	W–L	Date	Tournament	Tier	Surface	Opponent	Score
Win	1–0	Feb 2019	ITF Antalya, Turkey	W15	Clay	(Switzerland) Joanne Züger	6–2, 3–6, 6–3
Loss	1–1	Feb 2019	ITF Antalya, Turkey	W15	Clay	(Ukraine) Maryna Chernyshova	6–7^{(3)}, 6–2, 2–6
Loss	1–2	Mar 2019	ITF Antalya, Turkey	W15	Clay	(Australia) Seone Mendez	5–7, 6–7^{(3)}
Loss	1–3	Apr 2019	ITF Antalya, Turkey	W15	Clay	(Slovenia) Nika Radišić	3–6, 6–4, 6–7^{(5)}
Loss	1–4	May 2019	Kurume Cup, Japan	W60	Carpet	(Canada) Rebecca Marino	4–6, 6–7^{(0)}
Win	2–4	Jun 2019	ITF Kaltenkirchen, Germany	W15	Clay	(Denmark) Clara Tauson	4–6, 6–4, 6–0
Win	3–4	Jul 2019	ITF Turin, Italy	W25	Clay	(Italy) Elisabetta Cocciaretto	6–3, 6–4
Win	4–4	Aug 2019	ITF Nonthaburi, Thailand	W25	Hard	(China) Wang Xinyu	6–2, 6–7^{(4)}, 3–6
Win	5–4	Sep 2019	ITF Pula, Italy	W25	Clay	(France) Tessah Andrianjafitrimo	3–6, 7–5, 6–2
Win	6–4	Mar 2021	ITF Buenos Aires, Argentina	W25	Clay	(Brazil) Carolina Alves	1–6, 6–4, 6–3
Loss	6–5	Jan 2022	ITF Manacor, Spain	W25	Hard	(Lithuania) Justina Mikulskytė	3–6, 3–6
Loss	6–6	Apr 2022	Clay Court International, Australia	W60	Clay	(South Korea) Jang Su-jeong	7–6^{(3)}, 1–6, 4–6
Loss	6–7	May 2022	ITF Split, Croatia	W25	Clay	(Finland) Anastasia Kulikova	6–7^{(4)}, 1–6
Loss	6–8	Oct 2023	ITF Cairns, Australia	W25	Hard	(Australia) Taylah Preston	4–6, 4–6
Loss	6–9	Apr 2025	ITF Antalya, Turkey	W15	Clay	(Czech Republic) Sarah Melany Fajmonová	5–7, 1–6
Win	7–9	May 2026	Takasaki Open, Japan	W100	Hard	(Switzerland) Valentina Ryser	6–4, 6–3
Loss	7–10	Oct 2026	Challenger de Saguenay, Canada	W75	Hard (i)	(United States) Reese Brantmeier	6–7^{(8)}, 6–7^{(7)}

=== Doubles: 22 (11 titles, 11 runner-ups) ===
Legend W100 tournaments (2–0) W80 tournaments (1–0) W60 tournaments (1–2) W50 tournaments (0–2) W25/35 tournaments (6–4) W15 tournaments (1–2)	Finals by surface Hard (5–3) Clay (6–8)

Result	W–L	Date	Tournament	Tier	Surface	Partner	Opponents	Score
Win	1–0	Nov 2016	Tokyo Open, Japan	W100	Hard	(Japan) Rika Fujiwara	(United States) Jamie Loeb (Belgium) An-Sophie Mestach	6–4, 6–7^{(12)}, [10–8]
Win	2–0	Nov 2017	Tokyo Open, Japan (2)	W100	Hard	(Japan) Rika Fujiwara	(Japan) Eri Hozumi (Japan) Junri Namigata	6–1, 6–3
Win	3–0	May 2018	Kangaroo Cup, Japan	W80	Hard	(Japan) Rika Fujiwara	(Russia) Ksenia Lykina (United Kingdom) Emily Webley-Smith	7–5, 6–4
Loss	3–1	Jun 2018	ITF Klosters, Switzerland	W25	Clay	(Czech Republic) Lucie Hradecká	(Uzbekistan) Akgul Amanmuradova (Georgia (country)) Ekaterine Gorgodze	2–6, 3–6
Loss	3–2	Jul 2019	ITF Biella, Italy	W25	Clay	(Japan) Chihiro Muramatsu	(Romania) Elena Bogdan (Hungary) Réka Luca Jani	1–6, 3–6
Win	4–2	Jul 2019	ITF Turin, Italy	W25	Clay	(Japan) Chihiro Muramatsu	(Egypt) Mayar Sherif (Norway) Melanie Stokke	6–0, 6–2
Win	5–2	Oct 2019	ITF Santa Margherita die Pula, Italy	W25	Clay	(Japan) Eri Hozumi	(Russia) Amina Anshba (Czech Republic) Anastasia Dețiuc	6–4, 7–6^{(1)}
Loss	5–3	Apr 2021	Bellinzona Ladies Open, Switzerland	W60	Clay	(Canada) Rebecca Marino	(Kazakhstan) Anna Danilina (Georgia (country)) Ekaterine Gorgodze	5–7, 3–6
Loss	5–4	Mar 2022	Clay Court International, Australia	W60	Clay	(Japan) Moyuka Uchijima	(South Korea) Han Na-lae (South Korea) Jang Su-jeong	6–3, 2–6, [5–10]
Win	6–4	Mar 2023	Clay Court International, Australia	W60	Clay	(Japan) Erina Hayashi	(Australia) Destanee Aiava (Australia) Olivia Gadecki	7–6^{(2)}, 7–5
Win	7–4	Jul 2023	ITF Stuttgart, Germany	W25	Clay	(Japan) Mana Kawamura	(Czech Republic) Denisa Hindová (Czech Republic) Karolína Kubáňová	6–2, 6–7^{(4)}, [10–7]
Win	8–4	Oct 2023	ITF Cairns, Australia	W25	Hard	(Japan) Naho Sato	(Australia) Lizette Cabrera (Australia) Maddison Inglis	4–6, 6–3, [10–2]
Loss	8–5	Jan 2024	ITF Nonthaburi, Thailand	W50	Hard	(Poland) Maja Chwalińska	(Czech Republic) Anna Sisková; Ksenia Zaytseva	5–7, 6–7^{(3)}
Win	9–5	Feb 2024	ITF Traralgon, Australia	W35	Hard	(Japan) Naho Sato	(Australia) Destanee Aiava (Australia) Tenika McGiffin	6–1, 6–3
Win	10–5	Jun 2024	ITF Kuršumlijska Banja, Serbia	W35	Clay	(Japan) Mana Kawamura	(Algeria) Inès Ibbou (Serbia) Elena Milovanović	6–4, 6–4
Loss	10–6	Jul 2024	ITF Horb am Neckar, Germany	W35	Clay	Alina Charaeva	(Czech Republic) Aneta Kučmová (Slovenia) Nika Radišić	4–6, 7–6^{(3)}), [2–10]
Loss	10–7	Nov 2024	Brisbane QTC International, Australia	W50	Hard	(India) Ankita Raina	(Australia) Destanee Aiava (Australia) Maddison Inglis	3–6, 4–6
Loss	10–8	Feb 2025	ITF Antalya, Turkiye	W35	Clay	(Thailand) Punnin Kovapitukted	(Chinese Taipei) Li Yu-yun (China) Li Zongyu	3–6, 3–6
Loss	10–9	Feb 2025	ITF Antalya, Turkiye	W15	Clay	(Slovenia) Živa Falkner	(Italy) Vittoria Paganetti (Italy) Lisa Pigato	3–6, 4–6
Loss	10–10	Feb 2025	ITF Antalya, Turkiye	W35	Clay	Amina Anshba	(Chinese Taipei) Li Yu-yun (China) Li Zongyu	3–6, 4–6
Loss	10–11	Mar 2025	ITF Nonthaburi, Thailand	W35	Hard	(Thailand) Punnin Kovapitukted	(India) Shrivalli Bhamidipaty (India) Vaidehi Chaudhari	4–6, 3–6
Win	11–11	Apr 2025	ITF Antalya, Turkiye	W15	Clay	(Spain) Sara Dols	(Belgium) Kaat Coppez (Belgium) Amélie Van Impe	walkover

== Junior Grand Slam tournament finals ==
=== Doubles: 1 (runner-up) ===
Result	Year	Tournament	Surface	Partner	Opponents	Score
Loss	2018	French Open	Clay	(Japan) Naho Sato	(United States) Caty McNally (Poland) Iga Świątek	2–6, 5–7
