= 2024 Takasaki Open =

Tennis tournament

- Date: 18–24 November 2024
- Edition: 3rd
- Category: ITF Women's World Tennis Tour
- Prize money: $100,000
- Surface: Hard / Outdoor
- Location: Takasaki, Japan

Champions

Singles
- (Japan) Aoi Ito

Doubles
- (Japan) Momoko Kobori / (Japan) Ayano Shimizu
← 2023 ·	Takasaki Open	· 2025 →

The 2024 Takasaki Open is a professional tennis tournament played on outdoor hard courts. It is the third edition of the tournament which was part of the 2024 ITF Women's World Tennis Tour. It took place in Takasaki, Japan between 18 and 24 November 2024.

== Champions ==
=== Singles ===
- (Japan) Aoi Ito def. (China) Wei Sijia, 7–5, 6–4

=== Doubles ===
- (Japan) Momoko Kobori / (Japan) Ayano Shimizu def. (Chinese Taipei) Liang En-shuo / (Chinese Taipei) Tsao Chia-yi, 4–6, 6–4, [10–3]

== Singles main draw entrants ==
=== Seeds ===
Country	Player	Rank^{1}	Seed
GER	Tatjana Maria	101	1
CHN	Wei Sijia	131	2
THA	Mananchaya Sawangkaew	133	3
JPN	Aoi Ito	157	4
PHI	Alexandra Eala	158	5
JPN	Sara Saito	162	6
	Aliona Falei	196	7
CHN	Zhang Shuai	219	8

- ^{1} Rankings are as of 11 November 2023.

=== Other entrants ===
The following players received wildcards into the singles main draw:

- (Japan) Natsumi Kawaguchi
- (Japan) Hayu Kinoshita
- (Japan) Ena Koike
- (Japan) Kayo Nishimura

The following player received entry into the singles main draw using a special ranking:

- (Indonesia) Priska Madelyn Nugroho

The following players received entry from the qualifying draw:

- (Norway) Malene Helgø
- (Japan) Honoka Kobayashi
- (Japan) Momoko Kobori
- (Japan) Ayumi Miyamoto
- (Japan) Chihiro Muramatsu
- (Japan) Akiko Omae
- Ekaterina Shalimova
- (Chinese Taipei) Tsao Chia-yi
