= 2023 Takasaki Open =

Tennis tournament

- Date: 13–19 November 2023
- Edition: 1st
- Category: ITF Women's World Tennis Tour
- Prize money: $100,000
- Surface: Hard / Outdoor
- Location: Takasaki, Japan

Champions

Singles
- (China) Yuan Yue

Doubles
- (China) Guo Hanyu / (China) Jiang Xinyu
Takasaki Open	· 2024 →

The 2023 Takasaki Open is a professional tennis tournament played on outdoor hard courts. It is the first edition of the tournament which was part of the 2023 ITF Women's World Tennis Tour. It took place in Takasaki, Japan between 13 and 19 November 2023.

== Champions ==
=== Singles ===
- (China) Yuan Yue def. (United Kingdom) Harriet Dart, 5–7, 7–5, 6–0

=== Doubles ===
- (China) Guo Hanyu / (China) Jiang Xinyu def. (Japan) Momoko Kobori / (Japan) Ayano Shimizu, 7–6^{(7–5)}, 5–7, [10–5]

== Singles main draw entrants ==
=== Seeds ===
Country	Player	Rank^{1}	Seed
CZE	Linda Fruhvirtová	89	1
JPN	Nao Hibino	90	2
CHN	Wang Yafan	97	3
CHN	Bai Zhuoxuan	107	4
CHN	Yuan Yue	108	5
AUS	Kimberly Birrell	113	6
JPN	Mai Hontama	124	7
HUN	Dalma Gálfi	136	8

- ^{1} Rankings are as of 6 November 2023.

=== Other entrants ===
The following players received wildcards into the singles main draw:

- (Japan) Sayaka Ishii
- (Japan) Haruka Kaji
- (Japan) Sara Saito
- (Japan) Ayano Shimizu

The following player received entry into the singles main draw using a special ranking:

- (Liechtenstein) Kathinka von Deichmann

The following players received entry from the qualifying draw:

- (Hong Kong) Eudice Chong
- (Japan) Sakura Hosogi
- (Japan) Ena Koike
- (Chinese Taipei) Liang En-shuo
- (Japan) Kyōka Okamura
- (Thailand) Mananchaya Sawangkaew
- (Ukraine) Kateryna Volodko
- (China) Wei Sijia
