= 2025 Takasaki Open =

Tennis tournament

- Date: 17–23 November 2025
- Edition: 4th
- Category: ITF Women's World Tennis Tour
- Prize money: $100,000
- Surface: Hard / Outdoor
- Location: Takasaki, Japan

Champions

Singles
- (Japan) Himeno Sakatsume

Doubles
- (Japan) Momoko Kobori / (Japan) Ayano Shimizu
← 2024 ·	Takasaki Open	· 2026 →

The 2025 Takasaki Open is a professional tennis tournament played on outdoor hard courts. It is the fourth edition of the tournament which was part of the 2025 ITF Women's World Tennis Tour. It took place in Takasaki, Japan between 17 and 23 November 2025.

== Champions ==
=== Singles ===
- (Japan) Himeno Sakatsume def. (South Korea) Ku Yeon-woo, 6–3, 1–6, 6–4

=== Doubles ===
- (Japan) Momoko Kobori / (Japan) Ayano Shimizu def. (Chinese Taipei) Lee Ya-hsin / (China) Ye Qiuyu, 3–6, 7–5, [12–10]

== Singles main draw entrants ==
=== Seeds ===
Country	Player	Rank^{1}	Seed
CHN	Zhang Shuai	102	1
THA	Lanlana Tararudee	143	2
JPN	Himeno Sakatsume	178	3
JPN	Nao Hibino	186	4
JPN	Kyōka Okamura	237	5
JPN	Sara Saito	250	6
KOR	Ku Yeon-woo	252	7
JPN	Mai Hontama	260	8

- ^{1} Rankings are as of 10 November 2025.

=== Other entrants ===
The following players received wildcards into the singles main draw:

- (Japan) Hayu Kinoshita
- (Japan) Yuno Kitahara
- (Japan) Ena Koike
- (Japan) Eri Shimizu

The following player received entry into the singles main draw using a special ranking:

- Darya Astakhova

The following players received entry from the qualifying draw:

- (Japan) Mayuka Aikawa
- (Japan) Natsumi Kawaguchi
- Jana Kolodynska
- (Slovakia) Viktória Morvayová
- (Japan) Mio Mushika
- (Japan) Hikaru Sato
- Kristiana Sidorova
- (Japan) Natsuki Yoshimoto
