= 2025 Takasaki Open – Doubles =

Doubles
- 2025 Takasaki Open

Final
- Champion: (Japan) Momoko Kobori (Japan) Ayano Shimizu
- Runner-up: (Chinese Taipei) Lee Ya-hsin (China) Ye Qiuyu
- Score: 3–6, 7–5, [12–10]

Events
Singles	Doubles
← 2024 ·	Takasaki Open	· 2026 →

Momoko Kobori and Ayano Shimizu successfully defended their title, defeating Lee Ya-hsin and Ye Qiuyu in the final; 3–6, 7–5, [12–10].

== Seeds ==
1. (Chinese Taipei) Liang En-shuo / (Thailand) Peangtarn Plipuech (first round)
2. (Japan) Momoko Kobori / (Japan) Ayano Shimizu (champions)
3. (Chinese Taipei) Cho I-hsuan / (Chinese Taipei) Cho Yi-tsen (semifinals)
4. (United Kingdom) Naiktha Bains / (India) Rutuja Bhosale (semifinals)

== Draw ==
Key

- Q = Qualifier
- WC = Wild card
- LL = Lucky loser
- Alt = Alternate
- ITF = ITF entry
- PR = Protected ranking
- SR = Special ranking
- SE = Special exempt
- JE = Junior exempt
- JR = Junior Accelerator Programme entrant
- CO = College Accelerator Programme entrant
- NG = Next Gen Accelerator Program entrant
- w/o = Walkover
- r = Retired
- d = Defaulted

=== Draw ===
First round
1	(Chinese Taipei) E-s Liang (Thailand) P Plipuech	6	3	[3]
(Japan) M Ayukawa (Japan) K Morisaki	3	6	[10]
(Japan) M Hontama (Japan) A Omae	4	6^{3}
(Chinese Taipei) Y-h Lee (China) Q Ye	6	7^{7}
4	(United Kingdom) N Bains (India) R Bhosale	1	6	[11]
(South Korea) Y-w Ku (Japan) E Shimizu	6	2	[9]
(Chinese Taipei) Y-y Li (China) Z Li	2	6	[10]
(Japan) S Hosogi (Japan) N Kawaguchi	6	1	[4]
(Japan) S Saito (Japan) H Sakatsume	6	5	[6]
(Indonesia) P Nugroho (South Korea) S-h Park	1	7	[10]
(Japan) M Kawamura (Japan) H Sato	6	1	[5]
3	(Chinese Taipei) I-h Cho (Chinese Taipei) Y-t Cho	2	6	[10]
(Japan) N Katsumi (Japan) K Yoshioka	6	6
(Japan) H Kinoshita (Japan) Y Kitahara	4	2
(Japan) Y Hosoki (Japan) A Ozeki	2	3
2	(Japan) M Kobori (Japan) A Shimizu	6	6

Quarterfinals
(Japan) M Ayukawa (Japan) K Morisaki	6^{r}
(Chinese Taipei) Y-h Lee (China) Q Ye	6
4	(United Kingdom) N Bains (India) R Bhosale	6	6
(Chinese Taipei) Y-y Li (China) Z Li	4	2
(Indonesia) P Nugroho (South Korea) S-h Park	6^{6}	4
3	(Chinese Taipei) I-h Cho (Chinese Taipei) Y-t Cho	7^{8}	6
(Japan) N Katsumi (Japan) K Yoshioka	3	1
2	(Japan) M Kobori (Japan) A Shimizu	6	6

Semifinals
(Chinese Taipei) Y-h Lee (China) Q Ye	1	7^{7}	[10]
4	(United Kingdom) N Bains (India) R Bhosale	6	6^{3}	[6]
3	(Chinese Taipei) I-h Cho (Chinese Taipei) Y-t Cho	1	0
2	(Japan) M Kobori (Japan) A Shimizu	6	6

Final
(Chinese Taipei) Y-h Lee (China) Q Ye	6	5	[10]
2	(Japan) M Kobori (Japan) A Shimizu	3	7	[12]
