= 2023 Takasaki Open – Singles =

Singles
- 2023 Takasaki Open

Final
- Champion: (China) Yuan Yue
- Runner-up: (United Kingdom) Harriet Dart
- Score: 5–7, 7–5, 6–0

Events
Singles	Doubles
Takasaki Open	· 2024 →

Yuan Yue defeated Harriet Dart in the final, 5–7, 7–5, 6–0 to win the singles title at the 2023 Takasaki Open.

This was the first edition of the tournament.

== Seeds ==
1. (Czech Republic) Linda Fruhvirtová (second round)
2. (Japan) Nao Hibino (first round)
3. (China) Wang Yafan (first round)
4. (China) Bai Zhuoxuan (first round)
5. (China) Yuan Yue (champion)
6. (Australia) Kimberly Birrell (first round)
7. (Japan) Mai Hontama (second round)
8. (Hungary) Dalma Gálfi (first round)

== Draw ==
=== Key ===
- Q = Qualifier
- WC = Wild card
- LL = Lucky loser
- Alt = Alternate
- ITF = ITF entry
- PR = Protected ranking
- SR = Special ranking
- SE = Special exempt
- JE = Junior exempt
- JR = Junior Accelerator Programme entrant
- CO = College Accelerator Programme entrant
- NG = Next Gen Accelerator Program entrant
- w/o = Walkover
- r = Retired
- d = Defaulted

=== Finals ===
Semifinals
Q	(Chinese Taipei) Liang En-shuo	4	1
5	(China) Yuan Yue	6	6
(United Kingdom) Harriet Dart	4	6	6
Q	(China) Wei Sijia	6	2	1

Final
5	(China) Yuan Yue	5	7	6
(United Kingdom) Harriet Dart	7	5	0

=== Top half ===
First round
1	(Czech Republic) L Fruhvirtová	6	6
Q	(Hong Kong) E Chong	2	3
Q	(Thailand) M Sawangkaew	7^{7}	7
(Chinese Taipei) Y-y Yang	6^{5}	5
V Savinykh	4	6	7
A Tikhonova	6	1	5
Q	(Chinese Taipei) E-s Liang	6	1	7
6	(Australia) K Birrell	3	6	5
4	(China) Z Bai	6	2	6^{7}
(Serbia) N Stevanović	3	6	7^{9}
Q	(Japan) S Hosogi	0	1
(South Korea) N-l Han	6	6
(Netherlands) A Hartono	2	1
(South Korea) S-j Jang	6	6
SR	(Liechtenstein) K von Deichmann	3	0
5	(China) Y Yuan	6	6

Second round
1	(Czech Republic) L Fruhvirtová	3	6^{5}
Q	(Thailand) M Sawangkaew	6	7^{7}
V Savinykh	0	5
Q	(Chinese Taipei) E-s Liang	6	7
(Serbia) N Stevanović	6	5	6
(South Korea) N-l Han	3	7	3
(South Korea) S-j Jang	3	4
5	(China) Y Yuan	6	6

Quarterfinals
Q	(Thailand) M Sawangkaew	5	6	2
Q	(Chinese Taipei) E-s Liang	7	3	6
(Serbia) N Stevanović	0	3
5	(China) Y Yuan	6	6

Semifinals
Q	(Chinese Taipei) E-s Liang	4	1
5	(China) Y Yuan	6	6

=== Bottom half ===
First round
8	(Hungary) D Gálfi	5	6	4
Q	(Japan) K Okamura	7	4	6
P Kudermetova	3	6	4
WC	(Japan) S Saito	6	2	6
(Canada) C Zhao	2	2
(United Kingdom) H Dart	6	6
WC	(Japan) H Kaji	6	6
3	(China) Y Wang	3	4
7	(Japan) M Hontama	6	6
WC	(Japan) S Ishii	1	3
Q	(Ukraine) K Volodko	3	5
Q	(China) S Wei	6	7
WC	(Japan) A Shimizu	6	3	7^{9}
(Japan) H Sakatsume	4	6	6^{7}
Q	(Japan) E Koike	6	7
2	(Japan) N Hibino	4	5

Second round
Q	(Japan) K Okamura	6	3	6
WC	(Japan) S Saito	3	6	4
(United Kingdom) H Dart	6	6
WC	(Japan) H Kaji	4	3
7	(Japan) M Hontama	2	4
Q	(China) S Wei	6	6
WC	(Japan) A Shimizu	5	2
Q	(Japan) E Koike	7	6

Quarterfinals
Q	(Japan) K Okamura	6	3	0
(United Kingdom) H Dart	3	6	6
Q	(China) S Wei	6	6
Q	(Japan) E Koike	4	3

Semifinals
(United Kingdom) H Dart	4	6	6
Q	(China) S Wei	6	2	1
