= 2025 Takasaki Open – Singles =

Singles
- 2025 Takasaki Open

Final
- Champion: (Japan) Himeno Sakatsume
- Runner-up: (South Korea) Ku Yeon-woo
- Score: 6–3, 1–6, 6–4

Events
| Singles | Doubles |
| ← 2024 · | Takasaki Open | · 2026 → |

Aoi Ito was the defending champion, but chose not to participate.

Himeno Sakatsume won the title, defeating Ku Yeon-woo in the final; 6–3, 1–6, 6–4

== Seeds ==
1. (China) Zhang Shuai (semifinals)
2. (Thailand) Lanlana Tararudee (semifinals)
3. (Japan) Himeno Sakatsume (champion)
4. (Japan) Nao Hibino (quarterfinals)
5. (Japan) Kyōka Okamura (first round)
6. (Japan) Sara Saito (first round)
7. (South Korea) Ku Yeon-woo (final)
8. (Japan) Mai Hontama (first round)

== Draw ==
Key

- Q = Qualifier
- WC = Wild card
- LL = Lucky loser
- Alt = Alternate
- ITF = ITF entry
- PR = Protected ranking
- SR = Special ranking
- SE = Special exempt
- JE = Junior exempt
- JR = Junior Accelerator Programme entrant
- CO = College Accelerator Programme entrant
- NG = Next Gen Accelerator Program entrant
- w/o = Walkover
- r = Retired
- d = Defaulted

=== Finals ===
Semifinals
1 | (China) Zhang Shuai | 3 | 6 | 6^{4}
7 | (South Korea) Ku Yeon-woo | 6 | 4 | 7^{7}
3 | (Japan) Himeno Sakatsume | 6 | 6
2 | (Thailand) Lanlana Tararudee | 4 | 4

Final
7 | (South Korea) Ku Yeon-woo | 3 | 6 | 4
3 | (Japan) Himeno Sakatsume | 6 | 1 | 6

=== Top half ===
First round
1 | (China) S Zhang | 6 | 6
(Japan) H Kaji | 4 | 3
Q | (Japan) M Aikawa | 6^{0} | 3
(United States) H Chang | 7^{7} | 6
(Japan) S Hosogi | 4 | 2
Q | K Sidorova | 6 | 6
SR | D Astakhova | 6 | 6
5 | (Japan) K Okamura | 1 | 2
4 | (Japan) N Hibino | 7 | 6
Q | (Slovakia) V Morvayová | 5 | 3
Q | (Japan) N Kawaguchi | 6 | 4 | 4
WC | (Japan) E Shimizu | 3 | 6 | 6
(Japan) A Shimizu | 2 | 6^{7}
(Japan) S Akita | 6 | 7^{9}
Q | J Kolodynska | 3 | 2
7 | (South Korea) Y-w Ku | 6 | 6

Second round
1 | (China) S Zhang | 6 | 6
(United States) H Chang | 3 | 2
Q | K Sidorova | 1 | 0
SR | D Astakhova | 6 | 6
4 | (Japan) N Hibino | 6 | 6
WC | (Japan) E Shimizu | 3 | 2
(Japan) S Akita | 6 | 1 | 3
7 | (South Korea) Y-w Ku | 3 | 6 | 6

Quarterfinals
1 | (China) S Zhang | 6 | 4 | 6
SR | D Astakhova | 3 | 6 | 3
4 | (Japan) N Hibino | 6 | 5 | 5
7 | (South Korea) Y-w Ku | 3 | 7 | 7

Semifinals
1 | (China) S Zhang | 3 | 6 | 6^{4}
7 | (South Korea) Y-w Ku | 6 | 4 | 7^{7}

=== Bottom half ===
First round
6 | (Japan) S Saito | 1 | 4
(South Korea) S-h Park | 6 | 6
(Indonesia) P Nugroho | 2 | 6 | 4
(Kazakhstan) Z Diyas | 6 | 0 | 6
(Chinese Taipei) E-s Liang | 6 | 6
WC | (Japan) Y Kitahara | 1 | 3
WC | (Japan) H Kinoshita | 4 | 5
3 | (Japan) H Sakatsume | 6 | 7
8 | (Japan) M Hontama | 1 | 6^{4}
Q | (Japan) N Yoshimoto | 6 | 7^{7}
(Japan) R Saigo | 6 | 6
Q | (Japan) Mi Mushika | 3 | 2
WC | (Japan) E Koike | 6 | 2 | 4
Q | (Japan) H Sato | 3 | 6 | 6
(Turkey) B Cengiz | 7 | 5 | 4
2 | (Thailand) L Tararudee | 5 | 7 | 6

Second round
(South Korea) S-h Park | 4 | 6^{6}
(Kazakhstan) Z Diyas | 6 | 7^{8}
(Chinese Taipei) E-s Liang | 0 | 4
3 | (Japan) H Sakatsume | 6 | 6
Q | (Japan) N Yoshimoto | 2 | 4
(Japan) R Saigo | 6 | 6
(Japan) H Sato | 4 | 0
2 | (Thailand) L Tararudee | 6 | 6

Quarterfinals
(Kazakhstan) Z Diyas | 2 | 2
3 | (Japan) H Sakatsume | 6 | 6
(Japan) R Saigo | 3 | 6 | 3
2 | (Thailand) L Tararudee | 6 | 3 | 6

Semifinals
3 | (Japan) H Sakatsume | 6 | 6
2 | (Thailand) L Tararudee | 4 | 4
