= 2023 Takasaki Open – Doubles =

Doubles
- 2023 Takasaki Open

Final
- Champion: (China) Guo Hanyu (China) Jiang Xinyu
- Runner-up: (Japan) Momoko Kobori (Japan) Ayano Shimizu
- Score: 7–6^{(7–5)}, 5–7, [10–5]

Events
Singles	Doubles
Takasaki Open	· 2024 →

This was the first edition of the tournament.

Guo Hanyu and Jiang Xinyu won the title after defeating Momoko Kobori and Ayano Shimizu 7–6^{(7–5)}, 5–7, [10–5] in the final.

== Seeds ==
1. (Japan) Eri Hozumi / (Japan) Makoto Ninomiya (semifinals)
2. (China) Guo Hanyu / (China) Jiang Xinyu (champions)
3. (Chinese Taipei) Liang En-shuo / (Chinese Taipei) Wu Fang-hsien (semifinals)
4. (Thailand) Luksika Kumkhum / (Thailand) Peangtarn Plipuech (first round)

== Draw ==
Key

- Q = Qualifier
- WC = Wild card
- LL = Lucky loser
- Alt = Alternate
- ITF = ITF entry
- PR = Protected ranking
- SR = Special ranking
- SE = Special exempt
- JE = Junior exempt
- JR = Junior Accelerator Programme entrant
- CO = College Accelerator Programme entrant
- NG = Next Gen Accelerator Program entrant
- w/o = Walkover
- r = Retired
- d = Defaulted

=== Draw ===
First round
1	(Japan) E Hozumi (Japan) M Ninomiya	7^{7}	7^{7}
(Netherlands) A Hartono (Serbia) N Stevanović	6^{2}	6^{4}
(Ukraine) K Volodko (Canada) C Zhao	6	6
WC	(Japan) S Ishii (Japan) E Koike	4	2
4	(Thailand) L Kumkhum (Thailand) P Plipuech	6^{1}	2
(South Korea) N-l Han (South Korea) S-j Jang	7^{7}	6
(Hong Kong) E Chong (Japan) N Kawaguchi	5	3
WC	(Japan) M Kobori (Japan) A Shimizu	7	6
Alt	(Czech Republic) M Bayerlová (Liechtenstein) K von Deichmann	2	6^{2}
P Kudermetova; A Tikhonova	6	7^{7}
(China) Q Tang (Chinese Taipei) C-y Tsao	5	6^{5}
3	(Chinese Taipei) E-s Liang (Chinese Taipei) F-h Wu	7	7^{7}
(Japan) S Saito (Japan) E Shibahara	6	6
WC	(Japan) N Katsumi (Japan) K Yoshioka	1	2
(United Kingdom) H Dart; V Savinykh	5	4
2	(China) H Guo (China) X Jiang	7	6

Quarterfinals
1	(Japan) E Hozumi (Japan) M Ninomiya	6	6
(Ukraine) K Volodko (Canada) C Zhao	3	4
(South Korea) N-l Han (South Korea) S-j Jang	3	6	[4]
WC	(Japan) M Kobori (Japan) A Shimizu	6	3	[10]
P Kudermetova; A Tikhonova	2	3
3	(Chinese Taipei) E-s Liang (Chinese Taipei) F-h Wu	6	6
(Japan) S Saito (Japan) E Shibahara	0	4
2	(China) H Guo (China) X Jiang	6	6

Semifinals
1	(Japan) E Hozumi (Japan) M Ninomiya	5	6	[8]
WC	(Japan) M Kobori (Japan) A Shimizu	7	4	[10]
3	(Chinese Taipei) E-s Liang (Chinese Taipei) F-h Wu	2	0
2	(China) H Guo (China) X Jiang	6	6

Final
WC	(Japan) M Kobori (Japan) A Shimizu	6^{5}	7	[5]
2	(China) H Guo (China) X Jiang	7^{7}	5	[10]
