= 2024 Takasaki Open – Singles =

Singles
- 2024 Takasaki Open

Final
- Champion: (Japan) Aoi Ito
- Runner-up: (China) Wei Sijia
- Score: 7–5, 6–4

Events
Singles	Doubles
← 2023 ·	Takasaki Open	· 2025 →

Yuan Yue is the defending champion but chose not to participate.

Aoi Ito won the title, defeating Wei Sijia in the final; 7–5, 6–4.

== Seeds ==
1. (Germany) Tatjana Maria (first round)
2. (China) Wei Sijia (final)
3. (Thailand) Mananchaya Sawangkaew (semifinals)
4. (Japan) Aoi Ito (champion)
5. (Philippines) Alexandra Eala (quarterfinals)
6. (Japan) Sara Saito (quarterfinals)
7. Aliona Falei (first round)
8. (China) Zhang Shuai (second round)

== Draw ==
Key

- Q = Qualifier
- WC = Wild card
- LL = Lucky loser
- Alt = Alternate
- ITF = ITF entry
- PR = Protected ranking
- SR = Special ranking
- SE = Special exempt
- JE = Junior exempt
- JR = Junior Accelerator Programme entrant
- CO = College Accelerator Programme entrant
- NG = Next Gen Accelerator Program entrant
- w/o = Walkover
- r = Retired
- d = Defaulted

=== Finals ===
Semifinals
SR	(Indonesia) Priska Madelyn Nugroho	1	4
4	(Japan) Aoi Ito	6	6
3	(Thailand) Mananchaya Sawangkaew	5	6	1
2	(China) Wei Sijia	7	4	6

Final
4	(Japan) Aoi Ito	7	6
2	(China) Wei Sijia	5	4

=== Top half ===
First round
1	(Germany) T Maria	5	6^{2}
SR	(Indonesia) PM Nugroho	7	7^{7}
Q	(Japan) A Omae	6	1	6
Q	(Japan) C Muramatsu	1	6	2
(South Korea) S-j Jang	3	3
(Japan) H Kaji	6	6
Q	(Japan) M Kobori	7^{7}	4	7^{11}
7	A Falei	6^{3}	6	6^{9}
4	(Japan) A Ito	6	6
(Canada) V Mboko	3	2
(Japan) S Imamura	6	6
Q	(Japan) A Miyamoto	0	1
(Chinese Taipei) E-s Liang	6	6
K Pavlova	3	1
Q	E Shalimova	3	1
8	(China) S Zhang	6	6

Second round
SR	(Indonesia) PM Nugroho	6	6
Q	(Japan) A Omae	2	4
(Japan) H Kaji	6	6
Q	(Japan) M Kobori	4	1
4	(Japan) A Ito	7^{7}	6
(Japan) S Imamura	6^{3}	2
(Chinese Taipei) E-s Liang	6	7^{7}
8	(China) S Zhang	3	6^{3}

Quarterfinals
SR	(Indonesia) PM Nugroho	6	7^{7}
(Japan) H Kaji	2	6^{5}
4	(Japan) A Ito	6	7
(Chinese Taipei) E-s Liang	3	5

Semifinals
SR	(Indonesia) PM Nugroho	1	4
4	(Japan) A Ito	6	6

=== Bottom half ===
First round
5	(Philippines) A Eala	6	6
WC	(Japan) E Koike	2	0
WC	(Japan) K Nishimura	6	0	2
WC	(Japan) H Kinoshita	2	6	6
Q	(Norway) M Helgø	6	7
(Japan) N Sato	3	5
Q	(Chinese Taipei) C-y Tsao	6	3	2
3	(Thailand) M Sawangkaew	4	6	6
6	(Japan) S Saito	6	6
(China) X You	4	1
(Japan) A Shimizu	0	2
Q	(Japan) H Kobayashi	6	6
(United States) H Inoue	1	4
(Japan) M Yamaguchi	6	6
WC	(Japan) N Kawaguchi	3	3
2	(China) S Wei	6	6

Second round
5	(Philippines) A Eala	6	4	7
WC	(Japan) H Kinoshita	3	6	5
Q	(Norway) M Helgø	2	3
3	(Thailand) M Sawangkaew	6	6
6	(Japan) S Saito	6	6
Q	(Japan) H Kobayashi	3	2
(Japan) M Yamaguchi	4	6	2
2	(China) S Wei	6	2	6

Quarterfinals
5	(Philippines) A Eala	6	1	2
3	(Thailand) M Sawangkaew	4	6	6
6	(Japan) S Saito	6^{4}	6^{8}
2	(China) S Wei	7^{7}	7^{10}

Semifinals
3	(Thailand) M Sawangkaew	5	6	1
2	(China) S Wei	7	4	6
