= 2024 Kangaroo Cup – Doubles =

Doubles
- 2024 Kangaroo Cup

Final
- Champions: (Chinese Taipei) Liang En-shuo (China) Tang Qianhui
- Runners-up: (Australia) Kimberly Birrell (Canada) Rebecca Marino
- Score: 6–0, 6–3

Events
Singles	Doubles
← 2023 ·	Kangaroo Cup	· 2025 →

Han Na-lae and Jang Su-jeong were the defending champions but Han chose not to participate. Jang partnered alongside Lee Ya-hsuan, but they lost in the first round to Talia Gibson and Maddison Inglis.

Liang En-shuo and Tang Qianhui won the title, defeating Kimberly Birrell and Rebecca Marino in the final, 6–0, 6–3.

== Seeds ==
1. (Thailand) Luksika Kumkhum / (Thailand) Peangtarn Plipuech (semifinals)
2. (Chinese Taipei) Liang En-shuo / (China) Tang Qianhui (champions)
3. (Netherlands) Arianne Hartono / (India) Prarthana Thombare (quarterfinals)
4. (India) Rutuja Bhosale / (United Kingdom) Sarah Beth Grey (quarterfinals)

== Draw ==
=== Key ===
- Q = Qualifier
- WC = Wild card
- LL = Lucky loser
- Alt = Alternate
- SE = Special exempt
- PR = Protected ranking
- ITF = ITF entry
- JE = Junior exempt
- w/o = Walkover
- r = Retired
- d = Defaulted
- SR = Special ranking

First round
1	(Thailand) L Kumkhum (Thailand) P Plipuech	4	6	[10]
(Japan) A Ito (Japan) E Sema	6	3	[3]
(Canada) S Fung (United States) D Hewitt	4	6	[9]
(Japan) K Okamura (Japan) A Shimizu	6	4	[11]
3	(Netherlands) A Hartono (India) P Thombare	6^{1}	6	[13]
(China) Y Ma (Thailand) M Sawangkaew	7^{7}	4	[11]
(Australia) K Birrell (Canada) R Marino	2	6	[10]
WC	(Japan) Y Naito (Japan) N Sato	6	3	[8]
(United Kingdom) M Brooks (Hong Kong) E Chong	6	6
WC	(Japan) Y Ikedo (Japan) M Kimura	1	2
WC	(Japan) N Kawaguchi (South Korea) S-h Park	7	0	[6]
4	(India) R Bhosale (United Kingdom) SB Grey	5	6	[10]
(Australia) T Gibson (Australia) M Inglis	4	6	[10]
(South Korea) S-j Jang (Chinese Taipei) Y-h Lee	6	1	[8]
(Japan) S Imamura (Japan) M Kobori	4	1
2	(Chinese Taipei) E-s Liang (China) Q Tang	6	6

Quarterfinals
1	(Thailand) L Kumkhum (Thailand) P Plipuech	w/o
(Japan) K Okamura (Japan) A Shimizu
3	(Netherlands) A Hartono (India) P Thombare	3	1
(Australia) K Birrell (Canada) R Marino	6	6
(United Kingdom) M Brooks (Hong Kong) E Chong	2	6	[10]
4	(India) R Bhosale (United Kingdom) SB Grey	6	1	[7]
(Australia) T Gibson (Australia) M Inglis	6^{5}	2
2	(Chinese Taipei) E-s Liang (China) Q Tang	7^{7}	6

Semifinals
1	(Thailand) L Kumkhum (Thailand) P Plipuech	4	2
(Australia) K Birrell (Canada) R Marino	6	6
(United Kingdom) M Brooks (Hong Kong) E Chong	6	4	[7]
2	(Chinese Taipei) E-s Liang (China) Q Tang	2	6	[10]

Final
(Australia) K Birrell (Canada) R Marino	0	3
2	(Chinese Taipei) E-s Liang (China) Q Tang	6	6
