= 2024 Takasaki Open – Doubles =

Doubles
- 2024 Takasaki Open

Final
- Champion: (Japan) Momoko Kobori (Japan) Ayano Shimizu
- Runner-up: (Chinese Taipei) Liang En-shuo (Chinese Taipei) Tsao Chia-yi
- Score: 4–6, 6–4, [10–3]

Events
| Singles | Doubles |
| ← 2023 · | Takasaki Open | · 2025 → |

Guo Hanyu and Jiang Xinyu were the defending champions but chose not to participate.

Momoko Kobori and Ayano Shimizu won the title, defeating Liang En-shuo and Tsao Chia-yi in the final; 4–6, 6–4, [10–3].

== Seeds ==
1. (Chinese Taipei) Liang En-shuo / (Chinese Taipei) Tsao Chia-yi (final)
2. (Japan) Momoko Kobori / (Japan) Ayano Shimizu (champions)
3. (Japan) Hiromi Abe / (Japan) Saki Imamura (first round)
4. (Japan) Akiko Omae / (Thailand) Peangtarn Plipuech (semifinals)

== Draw ==
=== Key ===
- Q = Qualifier
- WC = Wild card
- LL = Lucky loser
- Alt = Alternate
- ITF = ITF entry
- PR = Protected ranking
- SR = Special ranking
- SE = Special exempt
- JE = Junior exempt
- JR = Junior Accelerator Programme entrant
- CO = College Accelerator Programme entrant
- NG = Next Gen Accelerator Program entrant
- w/o = Walkover
- r = Retired
- d = Defaulted

=== Draw ===
First round
1 | (Chinese Taipei) E-s Liang (Chinese Taipei) C-y Tsao | 6 | 6
(Japan) S Akita (Hong Kong) H-c Wu | 0 | 2
(Japan) A Ito (Japan) S Saito | 7^{7} | 6
(Japan) N Kawaguchi (Japan) N Sato | 6^{4} | 1
4 | (Japan) A Omae (Thailand) P Plipuech | 6 | 6
WC | (Japan) K Nishimura (Japan) K Soeda | 2 | 3
(Japan) M Ayukawa (Chinese Taipei) P-c Lee | 6 | 4 | [13]
(Norway) M Helgø; E Shalimova | 1 | 6 | [11]
(South Korea) S-j Jang (China) X You | 7^{7} | 6
(Japan) H Kinoshita (Japan) E Koike | 6^{3} | 3
(Chinese Taipei) I-h Cho (Chinese Taipei) Y-t Cho | 6 | 6
3 | (Japan) H Abe (Japan) S Imamura | 3 | 4
(Indonesia) PM Nugroho (Thailand) M Sawangkaew | 6 | 6
(Japan) M Aikawa (Japan) N Katsumi | 4 | 2
WC | (Japan) Y Hosoki (Japan) A Ozeki | 6^{1} | 7^{7} | [7]
2 | (Japan) M Kobori (Japan) A Shimizu | 7^{7} | 6^{3} | [10]

Quarterfinals
1 | (Chinese Taipei) E-s Liang (Chinese Taipei) C-y Tsao | 7^{7} | 6
(Japan) A Ito (Japan) S Saito | 6^{3} | 3
4 | (Japan) A Omae (Thailand) P Plipuech | 4 | 6 | [10]
(Japan) M Ayukawa (Chinese Taipei) P-c Lee | 6 | 3 | [6]
(South Korea) S-j Jang (China) X You | 2 | 6 | [7]
(Chinese Taipei) I-h Cho (Chinese Taipei) Y-t Cho | 6 | 3 | [10]
(Indonesia) PM Nugroho (Thailand) M Sawangkaew | 4 | 3
2 | (Japan) M Kobori (Japan) A Shimizu | 6 | 6

Semifinals
1 | (Chinese Taipei) E-s Liang (Chinese Taipei) C-y Tsao | 6 | 2 | [12]
4 | (Japan) A Omae (Thailand) P Plipuech | 4 | 6 | [10]
(Chinese Taipei) I-h Cho (Chinese Taipei) Y-t Cho | 0 | 2
2 | (Japan) M Kobori (Japan) A Shimizu | 6 | 6

Final
1 | (Chinese Taipei) E-s Liang (Chinese Taipei) C-y Tsao | 6 | 4 | [3]
2 | (Japan) M Kobori (Japan) A Shimizu | 4 | 6 | [10]
