= 2024 Kangaroo Cup – Singles =

Singles
- 2024 Kangaroo Cup

Final
- Champion: (Japan) Moyuka Uchijima
- Runner-up: (Australia) Arina Rodionova
- Score: 6–3, 6–3

Events
Singles	Doubles
← 2023 ·	Kangaroo Cup	· 2025 →

Himeno Sakatsume was the defending champion but chose to compete in Wiesbaden instead.

Moyuka Uchijima won the title, defeating Arina Rodionova in the final, 6–3, 6–3.

== Seeds ==
1. (Australia) Arina Rodionova (final)
2. (United States) Emina Bektas (second round)
3. (Japan) Mai Hontama (semifinals)
4. (Japan) Moyuka Uchijima (champion)
5. (United Kingdom) Lily Miyazaki (second round)
6. (Netherlands) Arianne Hartono (semifinals)
7. Valeria Savinykh (first round)
8. (Canada) Rebecca Marino (second round)

== Draw ==
=== Key ===
- Q = Qualifier
- WC = Wild card
- LL = Lucky loser
- Alt = Alternate
- SE = Special exempt
- PR = Protected ranking
- ITF = ITF entry
- JE = Junior exempt
- w/o = Walkover
- r = Retired
- d = Defaulted
- SR = Special ranking

=== Finals ===
Semifinals
1	(Australia) Arina Rodionova	6	6
3	(Japan) Mai Hontama	4	1
4	(Japan) Moyuka Uchijima	2	6	6
6	(Netherlands) Arianne Hartono	6	1	1

Final
1	(Australia) Arina Rodionova	3	3
4	(Japan) Moyuka Uchijima	6	6

=== Top half ===
First round
1	(Australia) Ar Rodionova	6	7^{7}
Q	(Serbia) A Krunić	3	6^{1}
WC	(Japan) A Ito	4	7^{7}	1
WC	(Japan) S Ishii	6	6^{2}	0^{r}
SE	(Japan) E Shibahara	4	5
(South Korea) S-j Jang	6	7
WC	(Japan) E Koike	4	5
5	(United Kingdom) L Miyazaki	6	7
3	(Japan) M Hontama	6	4	6
(Australia) K Birrell	2	6	2
(Thailand) M Sawangkaew	1	6	3
(Japan) H Kaji	6	3	6
Q	(Chinese Taipei) Y-h Lee	3	6	7
Q	(Hong Kong) E Chong	6	1	5
Q	(Japan) M Kuramochi	7	6
7	V Savinykh	5	1

Second round
1	(Australia) Ar Rodionova	7	6
WC	(Japan) A Ito	5	1
(South Korea) S-j Jang	6	6
5	(United Kingdom) L Miyazaki	3	4
3	(Japan) M Hontama	4	7	6
(Japan) H Kaji	6	5	3
Q	(Chinese Taipei) Y-h Lee	6	4	7^{7}
Q	(Japan) M Kuramochi	3	6	6^{2}

Quarterfinals
1	(Australia) Ar Rodionova	6	4	6
(South Korea) S-j Jang	2	6	4
3	(Japan) M Hontama	3	6	6
Q	(Chinese Taipei) Y-h Lee	6	4	3

Semifinals
1	(Australia) Ar Rodionova	6	6
3	(Japan) M Hontama	4	1

=== Bottom half ===
First round
8	(Canada) R Marino	6	6
(Australia) T Gibson	3	4
Q	(Japan) K Okamura	4	1
Q	(Japan) E Shimizu	6	6
(Canada) S Fung	5	2
(Australia) M Inglis	7	6
WC	(Japan) Y Ikedo	0	2
4	(Japan) M Uchijima	6	6
6	(Netherlands) A Hartono	6	6
(China) Y Ma	4	3
(Chinese Taipei) Y-y Yang	4	0
Q	(United Kingdom) SB Grey	6	6
(Japan) S Saito	6	6
(Canada) C Zhao	3	1
Q	(Thailand) T Naklo	6^{4}	2
2	(United States) E Bektas	7^{7}	6

Second round
8	(Canada) R Marino	4	6	3
Q	(Japan) E Shimizu	6	1	6
(Australia) M Inglis	3	4
4	(Japan) M Uchijima	6	6
6	(Netherlands) A Hartono	6	5	6
Q	(United Kingdom) SB Grey	3	7	2
(Japan) S Saito	6	6
2	(United States) E Bektas	1	3

Quarterfinals
Q	(Japan) E Shimizu	4	6	3
4	(Japan) M Uchijima	6	4	6
6	(Netherlands) A Hartono	6	6
(Japan) S Saito	1	1

Semifinals
4	(Japan) M Uchijima	2	6	6
6	(Netherlands) A Hartono	6	1	1
