= 2026 Takasaki Open =

Tennis tournament

- Date: 18–24 May 2026
- Edition: 5th
- Category: ITF Women's World Tennis Tour
- Prize money: $100,000
- Surface: Hard / Outdoor
- Location: Takasaki, Japan

2025 Champions

Singles
- (Japan) Himeno Sakatsume

Doubles
- (Japan) Momoko Kobori / (Japan) Ayano Shimizu
- Takasaki Open

The 2026 Takasaki Open is a professional tennis tournament played on outdoor hard courts. It is the fifth edition of the tournament which was part of the 2026 ITF Women's World Tennis Tour. It took place in Takasaki, Japan between 18 and 24 May 2026. This year's tournament was moved to May, after last year's tournament was held in November.

== Champions ==
=== Singles ===
- (Japan) Yuki Naito vs. (Switzerland) Valentina Ryser 6–4, 6–3

=== Doubles ===
- (Japan) Ayano Shimizu / (Japan) Eri Shimizu vs. (Chinese Taipei) Lee Ya-hsin / (Hong Kong) Cody Wong 6–1, 6–4

== Singles main draw entrants ==
=== Seeds ===
| Country | Player | Rank^{1} | Seed |
|---|---|---|---|
| THA | Mananchaya Sawangkaew | 175 | 1 |
| JPN | Hayu Kinoshita | 233 | 2 |
| CHN | Tian Fangran | 247 | 3 |
| USA | Hina Inoue | 259 | 4 |
| | Sofya Lansere | 268 | 5 |
| CYP | Raluca Șerban | 283 | 6 |
| JPN | Kyōka Okamura | 285 | 7 |
| KOR | Park So-hyun | 292 | 8 |

- ^{1} Rankings are as of 4 May 2026.

=== Other entrants ===
The following players received wildcards into the singles main draw:

- (Japan) Sayaka Ishii
- (Japan) Ena Koike
- (Japan) Kanon Sawashiro
- (Japan) Ayano Shimizu

The following player received entry into the singles main draw using a special ranking:

- (United Kingdom) Katy Dunne

The following players received entry from the qualifying draw:

- (Japan) Natsumi Kawaguchi
- (Japan) Momoko Kobori
- (Japan) Misaki Matsuda
- (Japan) Mio Mushika
- (Japan) Yuki Naito
- (Switzerland) Valentina Ryser
- (Japan) Hikaru Sato
- (Japan) Eri Shimizu

The following players received entry as lucky losers:

- (Japan) Erika Sema
- (Japan) Ikumi Yamazaki
