= 2024 Kangaroo Cup =

Tennis tournament

- Date: 29 April–5 May 2024
- Edition: 26th
- Category: ITF Women's World Tennis Tour
- Prize money: $100,000
- Surface: Hard / Outdoor
- Location: Gifu, Japan

Champions

Singles
- (Japan) Moyuka Uchijima

Doubles
- (Chinese Taipei) Liang En-shuo / (China) Tang Qianhui
- Kangaroo Cup

The 2024 Kangaroo Cup was a professional tennis tournament played on outdoor hard courts. It was the twenty-sixth edition of the tournament, which was part of the 2024 ITF Women's World Tennis Tour. It took place in Gifu, Japan, between 29 April and 5 May 2024.

== Champions ==
=== Singles ===
- (Japan) Moyuka Uchijima def. (Australia) Arina Rodionova, 6–3, 6–3

=== Doubles ===
- (Chinese Taipei) Liang En-shuo / (China) Tang Qianhui vs. (Australia) Kimberly Birrell / (Canada) Rebecca Marino, 6–0, 6–3

== Singles main draw entrants ==
=== Seeds ===
Country	Player	Rank	Seed
AUS	Arina Rodionova	104	1
USA	Emina Bektas	108	2
JPN	Mai Hontama	118	3
JPN	Moyuka Uchijima	130	4
GBR	Lily Miyazaki	140	5
NED	Arianne Hartono	141	6
	Valeria Savinykh	157	7
CAN	Rebecca Marino	160	8

- Rankings are as of 22 April 2024.

=== Other entrants ===
The following players received wildcards into the singles main draw:

- (Japan) Yukiko Ikedo
- (Japan) Sayaka Ishii
- (Japan) Aoi Ito
- (Japan) Ena Koike

The following players received entry from the qualifying draw:

- (Hong Kong) Eudice Chong
- (United Kingdom) Sarah Beth Grey
- (Serbia) Aleksandra Krunić
- (Japan) Miho Kuramochi
- (Chinese Taipei) Lee Ya-hsuan
- (Thailand) Thasaporn Naklo
- (Japan) Kyōka Okamura
- (Japan) Eri Shimizu
