= Ku Yeon-woo =

South Korean tennis player (born 2003)

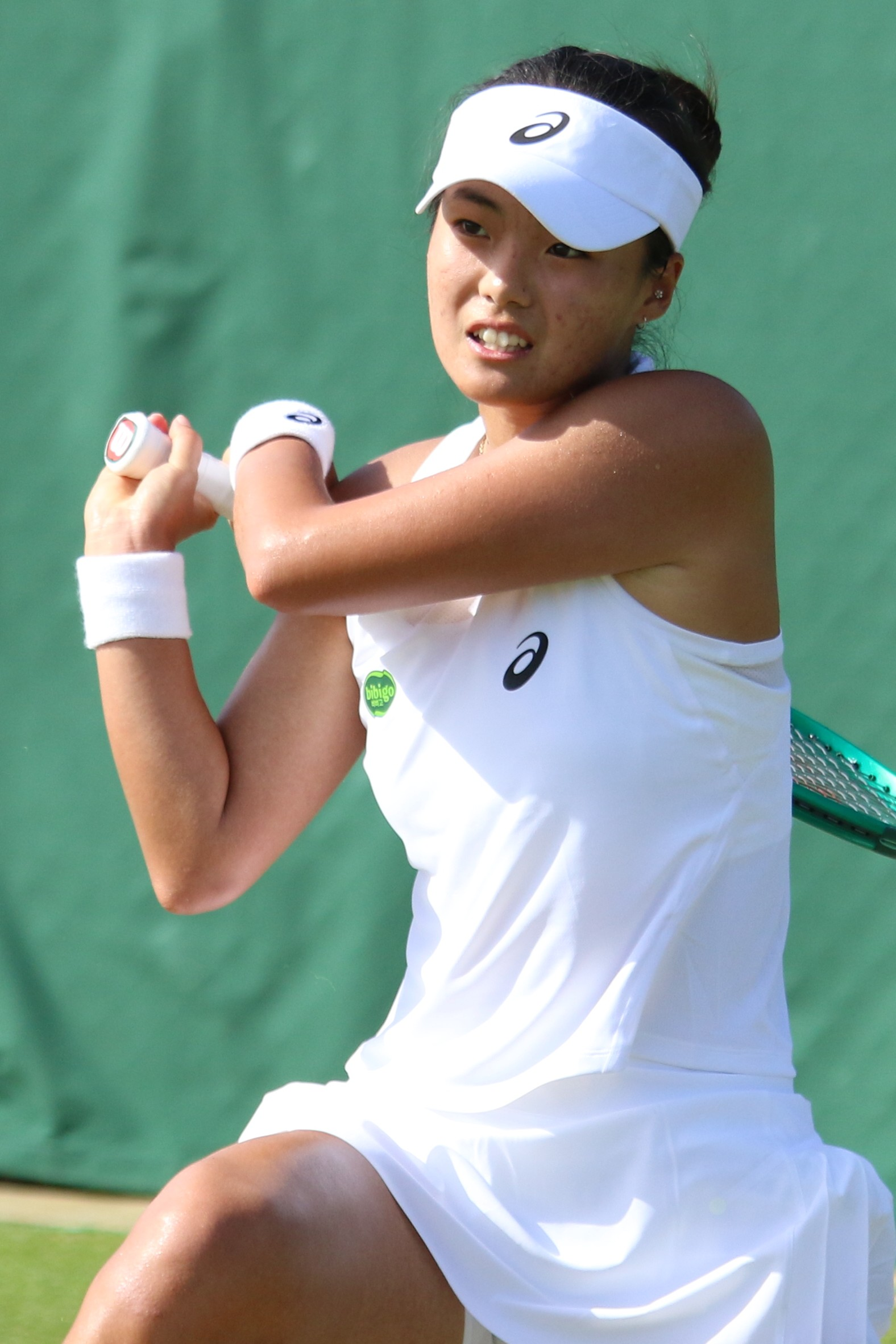
- Ku at the 2026 Wimbledon Championships
- Country (sports): South Korea
- Born: 15 March 2003 (age 23)
- Plays: Right-handed
- Prize money: $239,382

Singles
- Career record: 236–129
- Career titles: 8 ITF
- Highest ranking: No. 165 (26 October 2026)
- Current ranking: No. 166 (9 November 2026)

Grand Slam singles results
- Australian Open: Q1 (2026)
- French Open: Q1 (2026)
- Wimbledon: Q1 (2026)
- US Open: Q2 (2026)

Doubles
- Career record: 79–53
- Career titles: 7 ITF
- Highest ranking: No. 372 (6 October 2025)
- Current ranking: No. 699 (31 August 2026)
- Last updated on: 10 September 2026.

Ku Yeon-woo (born 15 March 2003) is a South Korean tennis player. She has a career-high singles ranking of world No. 172, achieved on 22 June 2026, and a best doubles ranking by the WTA of No. 372, reached on 6 October 2025. She is the current No. 1 Korean singles player.

== Career ==
Ku made her WTA Tour main-draw singles debut at the 2023 Korea Open as a qualifier, losing in the first round to Claire Liu.

She received a wildcard entry into the main draw at the 2025 Korea Open, but again lost in the first round, this time to Loïs Boisson.

== Performance timeline ==
Key
W	F	SF	QF	#R	RR	Q#	DNQ	A	NH

(W) winner; (F) finalist; (SF) semifinalist; (QF) quarterfinalist; (#R) rounds 4, 3, 2, 1; (RR) round-robin stage; (Q#) qualification round; (DNQ) did not qualify; (A) absent; (NH) not held; (SR) strike rate (events won / competed); (W–L) win–loss record.
To avoid confusion and double counting, these charts are updated at the conclusion of a tournament or when the player's participation has ended.

=== Singles ===
Tournament	2026	SR	W–L
Grand Slam tournaments
Australian Open	Q1	0 / 0	0–0
French Open	Q1	0 / 0	0–0
Wimbledon	Q1	0 / 0	0–0
US Open	Q2	0 / 0	0–0
Win–loss	0–0	0 / 0	0–0

== ITF Circuit finals ==
=== Singles: 16 (8 titles, 8 runner-ups) ===
Legend W100 tournaments (0–3) W50 tournaments (1–1) W35 tournaments (4–3) W15 tournaments (3–1)	Finals by surface Hard (8–7) Clay (0–1)

Result	W–L	Date	Tournament	Tier	Surface	Opponent	Score
Win	1–0	Aug 2019	ITF Yeongwol, South Korea	W15	Hard	(Thailand) Watsachol Sawatdee	3–6, 6–3, 6–2
Win	2–0	Oct 2021	ITF Sozopol, Bulgaria	W15	Hard	(Bulgaria) Julia Terziyska	6–4, 6–2
Win	3–0	Nov 2021	ITF Lousada, Portugal	W15	Hard (i)	(Slovenia) Živa Falkner	6–0, 7–5
Loss	3–1	Feb 2024	ITF Gurugram, India	W35	Hard	(Lithuania) Justina Mikulskytė	0–6, 1–6
Loss	3–2	Mar 2024	ITF Nagpur, India	W35	Clay	(Slovenia) Dalila Jakupović	1–6, 2–6
Loss	3–3	Mar 2025	ITF Kashiwa, Japan	W15	Hard	(Japan) Ayano Shimizu	3–6, 3–6
Win	4–3	Jun 2025	ITF Taipei, Taiwan	W35	Hard	(Japan) Rina Saigo	6–1, 6–4
Loss	4–4	Jul 2025	ITF Monastir, Tunisia	W35	Hard	(Japan) Sakura Hosogi	3–6, 3–6
Win	5–4	Sep 2025	ITF Nakhon Pathom, Thailand	W35	Hard	(Thailand) Anchisa Chanta	6–4, 2–0 ret.
Win	6–4	Oct 2025	ITF Lagos, Portugal	W35	Hard	(United States) Carolyn Ansari	6–2, 4–6, 7–6^{(5)}
Win	7–4	Oct 2025	ITF Loulé, Portugal	W35	Hard	(United States) Hibah Shaikh	7–6^{(6)}, 6–3
Loss	7–5	Nov 2025	Takasaki Open, Japan	W100	Hard	(Japan) Himeno Sakatsume	3–6, 6–1, 4–6
Loss	7–6	Nov 2025	Yokohama Challenger, Japan	W50	Hard	(China) Zhang Shuai	3–6, 2–6
Win	8–6	Jun 2026	ITF Montemor-o-Novo, Portugal	W50	Hard	(Portugal) Francisca Jorge	3–6, 6–4, 6–2
Loss	8–7	Jul 2026	Evansville Classic, United States	W100	Hard	(United States) Caroline Dolehide	6–7^{(3)}, 6–7^{(5)}
Loss	8–8	Nov 2026	Incheon Open, South Korea	W100	Hard	(United Kingdom) Katie Swan	1–6, 6–0, 3–6

=== Doubles: 14 (7 titles, 7 runner-ups) ===
Legend W25/35 tournaments (4–4) W15 tournaments (3–3)	Finals by surface Hard (4–4) Clay (3–3)

Result	W–L	Date	Tournament	Tier	Surface	Partner	Opponents	Score
Loss	0–1	Mar 2021	ITF Sharm El Sheikh, Egypt	W15	Hard	(Canada) Raphaëlle Lacasse	(United Kingdom) Alicia Barnett (Japan) Lily Miyazaki	4–6, 1–6
Win	1–1	Aug 2021	ITF Bad Waltersdorf, Austria	W15	Clay	(Indonesia) Priska Madelyn Nugroho	(Italy) Giulia Crescenzi (Italy) Arianna Zucchini	6–4, 6–3
Loss	1–2	Aug 2021	ITF Aix-en-Provence, France	W15	Clay	(Russia) Maria Bondarenko	(France) Julie Belgraver (France) Léa Tholey	1–6, 2–6
Win	2–2	Sep 2021	ITF Melilla, Spain	W15	Clay	(Sweden) Caijsa Hennemann	(Germany) Luisa Meyer auf der Heide (Germany) Chantal Sauvant	6–3, 6–0
Win	3–2	Oct 2021	ITF Seville, Spain	W25	Clay	(Sweden) Caijsa Hennemann	(North Macedonia) Lina Gjorcheska (Croatia) Tena Lukas	7–5, 6–1
Loss	3–3	Oct 2022	ITF Quinta da Lago, Portugal	W25	Clay	(Hungary) Adrienn Nagy	(Portugal) Francisca Jorge (Portugal) Matilde Jorge	4–6, 4–6
Win	4–3	May 2023	ITF Incheon, South Korea	W25	Hard	(South Korea) Choi Ji-hee	(Chinese Taipei) Li Yu-yun (China) Tang Qianhui	6–1, 6–1
Loss	4–4	Jul 2023	Open Castilla y León, Spain	W25	Hard	(Latvia) Diāna Marcinkēviča	(United States) Rasheeda McAdoo (Australia) Alexandra Osborne	4–6, 3–6
Loss	4–5	Mar 2024	ITF Nagpur, India	W35	Clay	(Lithuania) Justina Mikulskytė	(Romania) Irina Bara (Slovenia) Dalila Jakupović	7–6^{(8)}, 6–7^{(5)}, [7–10]
Win	5–5	Mar 2025	ITF Kashiwa, Japan	W15	Hard	(Japan) Naho Sato	(Japan) Eri Shimizu (Japan) Kisa Yoshioka	6–2, 6–4
Loss	5–6	Apr 2025	ITF Osaka, Japan	W35	Hard	(Indonesia) Janice Tjen	(Japan) Momoko Kobori (Japan) Ayano Shimizu	4–6, 5–7
Loss	5–7	May 2025	ITF Daegu, South Korea	W15	Hard	(South Korea) Kim Da-bin	(South Korea) Back Da-yeon (South Korea) Lee Eun-hye	1–6, 1–6
Win	6–7	Jun 2025	ITF Taipei, Taiwan	W35	Hard	(Japan) Eri Shimizu	(South Korea) Park So-hyun (Japan) Ayano Shimizu	6–4, 2–6, [10–5]
Win	7–7	Jul 2025	ITF Monastir, Tunisia	W35	Hard	(South Korea) Back Da-yeon	(Japan) Sakura Hosogi (Japan) Misaki Matsuda	6–3, 6–3
