= Wei Sijia =

Chinese tennis player (born 2003)

- Country (sports): China
- Born: 3 December 2003 (age 22)
- Plays: Right-handed
- Prize money: $621,193

Singles
- Career record: 198–116
- Career titles: 10 ITF
- Highest ranking: No. 114 (31 March 2025)
- Current ranking: No. 393 (24 August 2026)

Grand Slam singles results
- Australian Open: 1R (2025)
- French Open: Q2 (2024)
- Wimbledon: Q2 (2024)
- US Open: Q3 (2025)

Doubles
- Career record: 71–32
- Career titles: 11 ITF
- Highest ranking: No. 257 (17 July 2023)
- Current ranking: No. 799 (24 August 2026)

Team competitions
- BJK Cup: 1–1
- Last updated on: 30 August 2026.

Wei Sijia (born 3 December 2003) is a Chinese tennis player. She has a career-high singles ranking of 114 by the WTA, achieved on 31 March 2025, and a best doubles ranking of No. 257, attained on the 17 July 2023.

== Career ==
=== 2022: First tournament wins ===
After not playing on the ITF Women's World Tennis Tour in 2021, Wei began 2022 competing in qualifying draws at the $15k level. With steadily improving results, she won her first final at the end of June. This led to a total of 16 titles (ten in doubles), and her WTA ranking climbed from 1054 at the end of 2020 to 434 a year later. All 16 titles were won in Monastir, Tunisia. In 2022, her first full year on the ITF World Tour, Wei won more matches than any other player with 64 main-draw wins. Her total of ten doubles titles was also equal to the most for any player.

Wei won her first ITF Tour title above the $15k-level at the 2022 Open Feu Aziz Zouhir, in the doubles draw, partnering Priska Madelyn Nugroho. It was the fourth title win for the two partners.

=== 2023–2025: WTA Tour and major debuts ===
Wei qualified for the 2023 Jiangxi Open making her WTA Tour debut, losing in the first round to Kimberly Birrell.

She qualified for the main draw of the 2024 Thailand Open 2 but lost to compatriot and fellow qualifier, Gao Xinyu, in the first round. Ranked No. 140, she received a wildcard for the main draw of the WTA 1000 2024 China Open making her debut at this WTA Tour-level and defeated qualifier Elena-Gabriela Ruse for her first tour match win. She lost in the second round to 13th seed Beatriz Haddad Maia. Wei was given a wildcard entry into the 2024 Guangzhou Open and defeated sixth seed Rebecca Šramková in the first round to record her first win over a top-100 ranked opponent. In the second round, she lost to Wang Xiyu in three sets.

Wei was runner-up at the WTA 125 2025 Canberra Tennis International, losing to Aoi Ito in the final. She made her Grand Slam tournament main-draw debut at the 2025 Australian Open, losing to fourth seed Jasmine Paolini in the first round.

== WTA 125 finals ==
=== Singles: 1 (runner-up) ===
Result	W–L	Date	Tournament	Surface	Opponent	Score
Loss	0–1	Jan 2025	Canberra International, Australia	Hard	(Japan) Aoi Ito	4–6, 3–6

== ITF Circuit finals ==
=== Singles: 18 (11 titles, 7 runner-ups) ===
Legend W100 tournaments (0–1) W75 tournaments (1–0) W40/50 tournaments (1–3) W25/35 tournaments (2–2) W15 tournaments (7–1)	Finals by surface Hard (11–6) Clay (0–1)

Result	W-L	Date	Tournament	Tier	Surface	Opponent	Score
Win	1–0	Jun 2022	ITF Monastir, Tunisia	W15	Hard	(Japan) Eri Shimizu	6–3, 6–3
Win	2–0	Aug 2022	ITF Monastir, Tunisia	W15	Hard	(China) Yao Xinxin	4–6, 7–6^{(3)}, 6–4
Loss	2–1	Aug 2022	ITF Monastir, Tunisia	W15	Hard	(China) Li Zongyu	4–6, 3–6
Win	3–1	Sep 2022	ITF Monastir, Tunisia	W15	Hard	(China) Bai Zhuoxuan	6–1, 6–4
Win	4–1	Sep 2022	ITF Monastir, Tunisia	W15	Hard	(China) Li Zongyu	6–3, 6–1
Win	5–1	Oct 2022	ITF Monastir, Tunisia	W15	Hard	(China) Yao Xinxin	6–3, 6–2
Win	6–1	Oct 2022	ITF Monastir, Tunisia	W15	Hard	(Japan) Kyoba Kubo	6–2, 6–0
Win	7–1	Mar 2023	Open de Touraine, France	W25	Hard (i)	(China) Bai Zhuoxuan	6–4, 7–6^{(5)}
Loss	7–2	Aug 2023	Kunming Open, China	W40	Clay	(China) Gao Xinyu	3–6, 6–7^{(2)}
Loss	7–3	Oct 2023	ITF Qiandaohu, China	W25	Hard	Anastasiia Gureva	6–2, 6–7^{(6)}, 3–6
Win	8–3	Apr 2024	ITF Kashiwa, Japan	W50	Hard	(Chinese Taipei) Lee Ya-hsuan	6–1, 7–5
Loss	8–4	Apr 2024	ITF Shenzhen, China	W50	Hard	(China) Gao Xinyu	4–6, 4–6
Win	9–4	Jul 2024	ITF Tianjin, China	W25	Hard (i)	(United States) Hina Inoue	6–7^{(4)}, 6–2, 6–3
Win	10–4	Aug 2024	Lexington Challenger, United States	W75	Hard	(Thailand) Mananchaya Sawangkaew	7–5, 6–4
Loss	10–5	Nov 2024	Takasaki Open, Japan	W100	Hard	(Japan) Aoi Ito	5–7, 4–6
Loss	10–6	Nov 2025	Brisbane QTC International, Australia	W50	Hard	(United Kingdom) Katie Swan	6–3, 3–6, 3–6
Loss	10–7	Sep 2026	ITF Shenyang, China	W35	Hard	Kristiana Sidorova	4–6, 6–7^{(10)}
Win	11–7	Oct 2026	ITF Shenzhen, China	W15	Hard	Darya Khamutsianskaya	6–3, 6–4

=== Doubles: 14 (12 titles, 2 runner-ups) ===
Legend W60 tournaments (1–0) W40 tournaments (1–0) W25/35 tournaments (1–1) W15 tournaments (9–1)	Finals by surface Hard (12–2)

Result	W–L	Date	Tournament	Tier	Surface	Partner	Opponents	Score
Win	1–0	May 2022	ITF Monastir, Tunisia	W15	Hard	(United Kingdom) Kristina Paskauskas	(China) Liu Fangzhou (China) Wang Meiling	6–3, 7–6^{(4)}
Win	2–0	May 2022	ITF Monastir, Tunisia	W15	Hard	(China) Yao Xinxin	(Japan) Mei Hasegawa (Japan) Chihiro Takayama	6–1, 6–1
Win	3–0	May 2022	ITF Monastir, Tunisia	W15	Hard	(China) Yao Xinxin	(Spain) Valeria Koussenkova; Milana Zhabrailova	6–3, 6–3
Win	4–0	Jun 2022	ITF Monastir, Tunisia	W15	Hard	(United Kingdom) Kristina Paskauskas	(India) Ashmitha Easwaramurthi (Japan) Mei Hasegawa	6–1, 6–2
Win	5–0	Jun 2022	ITF Monastir, Tunisia	W15	Hard	(China) Yao Xinxin	(United Kingdom) Abigail Amos (Austria) Arabella Koller	6–0, 6–1
Win	6–0	Jun 2022	ITF Monastir, Tunisia	W15	Hard	(China) Yao Xinxin	(Japan) Yuka Hosoki (Japan) Eri Shimizu	6–3, 6–3
Win	7–0	Jul 2022	ITF Monastir, Tunisia	W15	Hard	(Indonesia) Priska Madelyn Nugroho	(South Korea) Back Da-yeon (South Korea) Jeong Bo-young	6–4, 6–1
Win	8–0	Jul 2022	ITF Monastir, Tunisia	W15	Hard	(Indonesia) Priska Madelyn Nugroho	Anastasiia Gureva (Greece) Michaela Laki	6–2, 4–6, [10–5]
Loss	8–1	Oct 2022	ITF Monastir, Tunisia	W15	Hard	(Indonesia) Priska Madelyn Nugroho	(Chinese Taipei) Lee Ya-hsin (Chinese Taipei) Tsao Chia-yi	6–1, 1–6, [3–10]
Win	9–1	Oct 2022	Monastir Open, Tunisia	W60	Hard	(Indonesia) Priska Madelyn Nugroho	(Netherlands) Isabelle Haverlag (Netherlands) Suzan Lamens	6–3, 6–2
Win	10–1	Oct 2022	ITF Monastir, Tunisia	W15	Hard	(Serbia) Elena Milovanović	(Tunisia) Feryel Ben Hassen (Poland) Gina Feistel	6–4, 6–1
Loss	10–2	Jun 2023	ITF La Marsa, Tunisia	W25	Hard	(Bulgaria) Isabella Shinikova	Anastasia Gasanova; Ekaterina Yashina	5–7, 7–6^{(1)}, [9–11]
Win	11–2	Jun 2023	ITF La Marsa, Tunisia	W40	Hard	Maria Kozyreva	(Ukraine) Kateryna Volodko (Japan) Hiroko Kuwata	5–7, 6–4, [10–6]
Win	12–2	Sep 2026	ITF Shenyang, China	W35	Hard	(China) Yuan Chengyiyi	(China) Huang Yujia (Indonesia) Priska Madelyn Nugroho	3–6, 6–2, [10–8]
