= Takasaki Open =

- 2026 Takasaki Open

Tournament information
- Event name: Takasaki Open
- Founded: 2023; 3 years ago
- Location: Takasaki, Japan
- Venue: Shimizu Zenzo Memorial Tennis Courts
- Surface: Hard / Outdoor
- Website: Official website
WTA Tour
- Category: ITF Women's Circuit
- Draw: 32S/32Q/16D
- Prize money: US$100,000

The Takasaki Open, is a professional tennis tournament played on hardcourts. It is currently part of the ITF Women's World Tennis Tour. The first edition is held in Takasaki, Japan in November 2023.

== Past finals ==
=== Singles ===
Year	Champion	Runner-up	Score
2026	(Japan) Yuki Naito	(Switzerland) Valentina Ryser	6–4, 6–3
2025	(Japan) Himeno Sakatsume	(South Korea) Ku Yeon-woo	6–3, 1–6, 6–4
2024	(Japan) Aoi Ito	(China) Wei Sijia	7–5, 6–4
2023 (2)	(China) Bai Zhuoxuan	(China) Yuan Yue	6–2, 6–3
2023	(China) Yuan Yue	(United Kingdom) Harriet Dart	5–7, 7–5, 6–0

=== Doubles ===
Year	Champions	Runners-up	Score
2026	(Japan) Ayano Shimizu (Japan) Eri Shimizu	(Chinese Taipei) Lee Ya-hsin (Hong Kong) Cody Wong	6–1, 6–4
2025	(Japan) Momoko Kobori (Japan) Ayano Shimizu	(Chinese Taipei) Lee Ya-hsin (China) Ye Qiuyu	3–6, 7–5, [12–10]
2024	(Japan) Momoko Kobori (Japan) Ayano Shimizu	(Chinese Taipei) Liang En-shuo (Chinese Taipei) Tsao Chia-yi	4–6, 6–4, [10–3]
2023 (2)	(Thailand) Luksika Kumkhum (Thailand) Peangtarn Plipuech	(Chinese Taipei) Liang En-shuo (Chinese Taipei) Wu Fang-hsien	6–3, 6–1
2023	(China) Guo Hanyu (China) Jiang Xinyu	(Japan) Momoko Kobori (Japan) Ayano Shimizu	7–6^{(7–5)}, 5–7, [10–5]
