= Tsao Chia-yi =

Taiwanese tennis player (born 2003)

- Country (sports): Chinese Taipei
- Born: 2 December 2003 (age 22) New Taipei City, Taiwan
- Plays: Right (two-handed both sides)
- Prize money: $78,550

Singles
- Career record: 117–73
- Career titles: 0
- Highest ranking: No. 464 (9 October 2023)
- Current ranking: No. 825 (31 August 2026)

Doubles
- Career record: 119–44
- Career titles: 1
- Highest ranking: No. 115 (12 August 2024)
- Current ranking: No. 648 (31 August 2026)

Grand Slam doubles results
- Australian Open: 1R (2025)

Other doubles tournaments
- Olympic Games: QF (2024)
- Last updated on: 8 September 2026.

Tsao Chia-yi (Chinese: 曹家宜, born 2 December 2003) is a Taiwanese tennis player. She has a career-high doubles ranking by the WTA of 115, achieved on 12 August 2024.

Tsao has won one doubles title on the WTA Tour and one on the WTA Challenger Tour. She has also won sixteen doubles titles on the ITF Circuit. In October 2023, she achieved her career-high singles ranking of world No. 464.

== Career ==
Tsao made her WTA Tour main-draw debut at the 2023 Hong Kong Open in doubles and won the title with Tang Qianhui.

Partnering Hsieh Su-wei, she reached the quarterfinals at the 2024 Paris Olympics, defeating Romanian duo Irina-Camelia Begu and Monica Niculescu and Ukrainians Marta Kostyuk and Dayana Yastremska. They lost to Czech pairing Karolína Muchová and Linda Nosková.

=== 2025: One year ban from competition ===
Tsao accepted a ban from professional tennis for 12 months, starting from March 2025, after she unintentionally took a cold medicine containing the banned stimulant Methylephedrine, without having a valid therapeutic use exemption.

== WTA Tour finals ==
=== Doubles: 1 (title) ===
Legend
WTA 500
WTA 250 (1–0)

Result	Date	Tournament	Tier	Surface	Partner	Opponents	Score
Win	Oct 2023	Hong Kong Open, China SAR	WTA 250	Hard	(China) Tang Qianhui	(Georgia (country)) Oksana Kalashnikova; Aliaksandra Sasnovich	7–5, 1–6, [11–9]

== WTA 125 finals ==
=== Doubles: 1 (title) ===
Result	W–L	Date	Tournament	Surface	Partner	Opponents	Score
Win	1–0	Jul 2024	Båstad Open, Sweden	Clay	(Thailand) Peangtarn Plipuech	(Argentina) María Lourdes Carlé (Argentina) Julia Riera	7–5, 6–3

== ITF Circuit finals ==
=== Singles: 2 (runner-ups) ===
Legend
W15 tournaments (0–2)

Result	W–L	Date	Tournament	Tier	Surface	Opponent	Score
Loss	0–1	Oct 2022	ITF Monastir, Tunisia	W15	Hard	(United Kingdom) Kristina Paskauskas	2–6, 6–4, 6–7^{(8)}
Loss	0–2	Nov 2022	ITF Monastir, Tunisia	W15	Hard	(Belgium) Hanne Vandewinkel	2–6, 5–7

=== Doubles: 22 (16 titles, 6 runner-ups) ===
Legend
W100 tournaments (0–1)
W50 tournaments (1–1)
W25/35 tournaments (4–2)
W15 tournaments (11–2)

Result	No.	Date	Tournament	Tier	Surface	Partner	Opponents	Score
Win	1–0	May 2022	ITF Cancún, Mexico	W15	Hard	(Japan) Saki Imamura	(Guatemala) Melissa Morales (Guatemala) Kirsten-Andrea Weedon	6–3, 6–1
Win	2–0	Sep 2022	ITF Monastir, Tunisia	W15	Hard	(Chinese Taipei) Lee Ya-hsin	(Poland) Emilia Durska (Italy) Camilla Zanolini	7–6^{(6)}, 6–4
Win	3–0	Sep 2022	ITF Monastir, Tunisia	W15	Hard	(Chinese Taipei) Lee Ya-hsin	(United Kingdom) Abigail Amos (United States) Jaeda Daniel	6–0, 6–1
Win	4–0	Oct 2022	ITF Monastir, Tunisia	W15	Hard	(Chinese Taipei) Lee Ya-hsin	(Indonesia) Priska Madelyn Nugroho (China) Wei Sijia	1–6, 6–1, [10–3]
Win	5–0	Oct 2022	ITF Monastir, Tunisia	W15	Hard	(Chinese Taipei) Lee Ya-hsin	(France) Flavie Brugnone (Netherlands) Stéphanie Visscher	6–4, 6–0
Win	6–0	Oct 2022	ITF Monastir, Tunisia	W15	Hard	(Chinese Taipei) Lee Ya-hsin	(Belgium) Hanne Vandewinkel (Slovakia) Radka Zelníčková	6–2, 6–4
Win	7–0	Nov 2022	ITF Monastir, Tunisia	W15	Hard	(Chinese Taipei) Wu Fang-hsien	(Latvia) Kamilla Bartone (Serbia) Bojana Marinković	6–0, 7–5
Win	8–0	Nov 2022	ITF Monastir, Tunisia	W15	Hard	(Chinese Taipei) Wu Fang-hsien	Anastasiia Gureva; Vlada Mincheva	6–3, 6–4
Win	9–0	Dec 2022	ITF Monastir, Tunisia	W15	Hard	(Chinese Taipei) Wu Fang-hsien	(Romania) Oana Gavrilă (United Kingdom) Emilie Lindh	6–4, 6–3
Loss	9–1	Jan 2023	ITF Monastir, Tunisia	W25	Hard	(Japan) Miho Kuramochi	(Romania) Oana Gavrilă (Greece) Sapfo Sakellaridi	5–7, 6–4, [6–10]
Loss	9–2	Jan 2023	ITF Monastir, Tunisia	W15	Hard	(Switzerland) Nadine Keller	(Chinese Taipei) Lee Ya-hsin (China) Yang Yidi	6–2, 3–6, [13–15]
Win	10–2	Mar 2023	ITF Hinode, Japan	W15	Hard	(Japan) Akari Inoue	(Chinese Taipei) Li Yu-yun (Japan) Rinon Okuwaki	6–4, 6–7^{(5)}, [10–5]
Win	11–2	Jun 2023	ITF Tainan, Taiwan	W25	Clay	(Chinese Taipei) Yang Ya-yi	(New Zealand) Monique Barry (Chinese Taipei) Lee Ya-hsin	6–2, 6–2
Win	12–2	Sep 2023	ITF Kyoto, Japan	W25	Hard	(Japan) Aoi Ito	(Japan) Hiromi Abe (Japan) Anri Nagata	6–2, 6–1
Loss	12–3	Jan 2024	ITF Nonthaburi, Thailand	W50	Hard	(Thailand) Lanlana Tararudee	(Kazakhstan) Zhibek Kulambayeva (Greece) Sapfo Sakellaridi	w/o
Win	13–3	Mar 2024	ITF Solarino, Italy	W35	Carpet	(Poland) Martyna Kubka	(Serbia) Katarina Kozarov (Russia) Veronika Miroshnichenko	6–4, 6–2
Win	14–3	Apr 2024	ITF Kashiwa, Japan	W50	Hard	(India) Ankita Raina	(United Kingdom) Madeleine Brooks (Hong Kong) Eudice Chong	6–4, 6–4
Loss	14–4	Nov 2024	Takasaki Open, Japan	W100	Hard	(Chinese Taipei) Liang En-shuo	(Japan) Momoko Kobori (Japan) Ayano Shimizu	6–4, 4–6, [3–10]
Loss	14–5	Apr 2026	ITF Singapore	W15	Hard (i)	(Japan) Erika Sema	(Japan) Rinko Matsuda (Luxembourg) Marie Weckerle	6–7^{(6)}, 2–6
Loss	14–6	Apr 2026	ITF Singapore	W15	Hard (i)	(Japan) Erika Sema	(Chinese Taipei) Lin Fang-an (South Korea) Shin Ji-ho	6–7^{(1)}, 7–5, [5–10]
Win	15–6	Jun 2026	ITF Taipei, Taiwan	W35	Hard	(South Korea) Back Da-yeon	(Japan) Natsumi Kawaguchi (Japan) Ayano Shimizu	7–5, 6–1
Win	16–6	Jun 2026	ITF Taipei, Taiwan	W35	Hard	(Chinese Taipei) Lee Ya-hsin	(Japan) Funa Kozaki (Japan) Mao Mushika	6–0, 6–4
