= Himeno Sakatsume =

Japanese tennis player (born 2001)

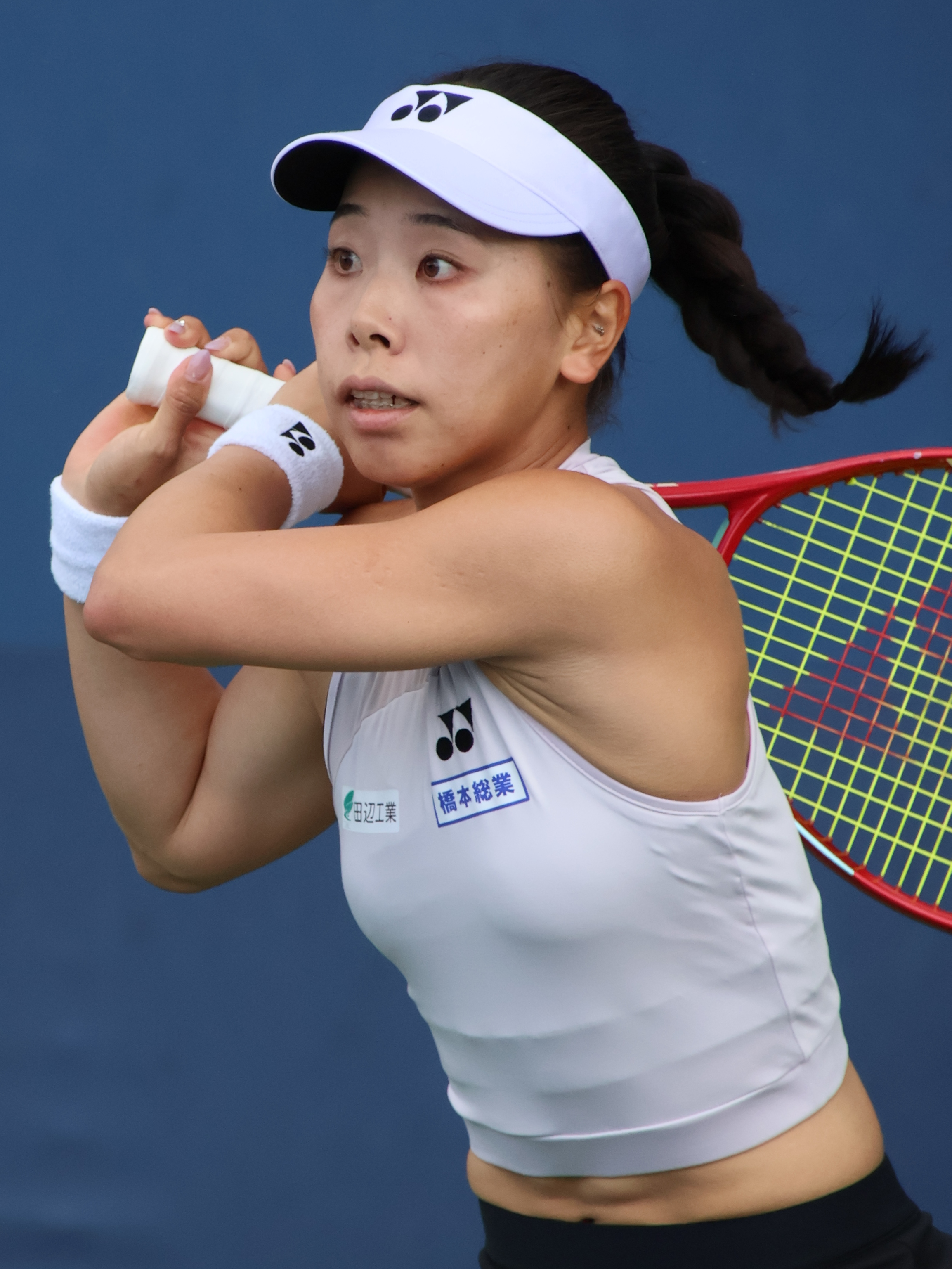
- Sakatsume at the 2026 US Open
- Country (sports): Japan
- Born: 3 August 2001 (age 25) Niigata Prefecture, Japan
- Height: 1.58 m (5 ft 2 in)
- Plays: Right (two-handed backhand)
- Prize money: $779,607

Singles
- Career record: 263–173
- Career titles: 8 ITF
- Highest ranking: No. 114 (26 October 2026)
- Current ranking: No. 114 (26 October 2026)

Grand Slam singles results
- Australian Open: 1R (2026)
- French Open: Q3 (2026)
- Wimbledon: Q1 (2023, 2026)
- US Open: 2R (2026)

Doubles
- Career record: 66–72
- Career titles: 2 ITF
- Highest ranking: No. 341 (6 October 2025)
- Current ranking: No. 729 (26 October 2026)

Team competitions
- BJK Cup: 2–0
- Last updated on: 26 October 2026.

Himeno Sakatsume (坂詰 姫野, Sakatsume Himeno; born 3 August 2001) is a Japanese tennis player. She reached a career-high singles ranking of No. 114ª by the WTA on 26 October 2026, and a best doubles ranking of No. 341 on 6 October 2025.

== Career ==
=== 2022: WTA Tour debut ===
Sakatsume made her WTA Tour main-draw debut at the 2022 Championnats de Granby, after entering the singles tournament as a lucky loser, but was defeated by Jasmine Paolini in the first round.

=== 2023: BJK, WTA 500 debut and first tour match win ===
She made her debut for the Japan Billie Jean King Cup team on 13 April 2023 in a tie against Uzbekistan, defeating Sabrina Olimjanova, and two days later defeated Jiang Xinyu from China, registering her first BJK Cup wins.

Having made it through qualifying, Sakatsume reached the second round at the Japan Women's Open, recording her first WTA Tour win over Alexandra Eala, before losing to third seed Wang Xinyu.

She made her WTA 500 debut at the 2023 Pan Pacific Open as a lucky loser, but lost to Linda Nosková.

=== 2025: First WTA Tour quarterfinal ===
As a qualifier, Sakatsume reached her maiden WTA quarterfinal at the 2025 Hong Kong Open, defeating fourth seed Sofia Kenin for her first win against a top-100 ranked player and then overcoming wildcard entrant Eudice Chong, before losing to fifth seed Maya Joint in three sets.

=== 2026: Major, WTA 1000 debut and first win ===
Sakatsume made her Grand Slam tournament debut at the 2026 Australian Open, after qualifying for the main draw.

She made her WTA 1000 debut at the Indian Wells Open and recorded her first win at the 1000-level over Alycia Parks, as a qualifier. Ranked at a career-high of No. 125, Sakatsume also entered the main draw of the 2026 Nottingham Open after qualifying, but lost to Jéssica Bouzas Maneiro.

== Performance timeline ==
Key
W	F	SF	QF	#R	RR	Q#	DNQ	A	NH

(W) winner; (F) finalist; (SF) semifinalist; (QF) quarterfinalist; (#R) rounds 4, 3, 2, 1; (RR) round-robin stage; (Q#) qualification round; (DNQ) did not qualify; (A) absent; (NH) not held; (SR) strike rate (events won / competed); (W–L) win–loss record.
To avoid confusion and double counting, these charts are updated at the conclusion of a tournament or when the player's participation has ended.

Only main-draw results in WTA Tour, Grand Slam tournaments, Billie Jean King Cup, United Cup, Hopman Cup and Olympic Games are included in win–loss records.

=== Singles ===
Current through the 2026 US Open.

Tournament	2022	2023	2024	2025	2026	SR	W–L
Grand Slam tournaments
Australian Open	A	A	Q1	A	1R	0 / 1	0–1
French Open	A	Q1	Q1	A	Q3	0 / 0	0–0
Wimbledon	A	Q1	A	A	Q1	0 / 0	0–0
US Open	A	Q3	A	A	2R	0 / 1	1–1
Win–Loss	0–0	0–0	0–0	0–0	1–2	0 / 2	1–2
WTA 1000
Indian Wells	A	A	A	A	2R	0 / 1	1–1
National representation
Billie Jean King Cup (Note: formerly known as Fed Cup until 2020.)	A	PO	A	A	A	0 / 0	2–0
Career statistics
Tournaments	1	2	0	1	2	total: 6	
Overall win–loss	0–1	3–2	0–0	2–1	1–2	0 / 6	6–6
Year-end ranking (Note: 2018: WTA ranking–696, 2019: WTA ranking–736, 2020: WTA ranking–646, 2021: WTA ranking–598.)	294	178	271	178		$779,607	

== ITF Circuit finals ==
=== Singles: 17 (8 titles, 9 runner-ups) ===
Legend W100 tournaments W80 tournaments W75 tournaments W50 tournaments W25/35 tournaments W15 tournaments	Finals by surface Hard (8–7) Clay (0–1) Carpet (0–1)

Result	W–L	Date	Tournament	Tier	Surface	Opponent	Score
Win	1–0	Sep 2018	ITF Kyoto, Japan	W15	Hard	(Japan) Haruna Arakawa	3–6, 6–3, 6–1
Win	2–0	Dec 2019	ITF Nonthaburi, Thailand	W15	Hard	(Uzbekistan) Nigina Abduraimova	7–6^{(3)}, 5–7, 6–1
Win	3–0	May 2021	ITF Monastir, Tunisia	W15	Hard	(Japan) Sakura Hosogi	6–4, 7–5
Win	4–0	Jun 2021	ITF Monastir, Tunisia	W15	Hard	(Japan) Sakura Hosogi	7–5, 7–5
Loss	4–1	Aug 2021	ITF Monastir, Tunisia	W15	Hard	(Japan) Ayumi Koshiishi	3–6, 6–7^{(3)}
Loss	4–2	Jul 2022	ITF Charleston Pro, United States	W100	Clay	(Canada) Carol Zhao	6–3, 4–6, 4–6
Loss	4–3	Mar 2023	ITF Toronto, Canada	W25	Hard (i)	(Canada) Katherine Sebov	4–6, 6–7^{(4)}
Loss	4–4	Mar 2023	ITF Fredericton, Canada	W25	Hard (i)	(Czech Republic) Gabriela Knutson	4–6, 4–6
Win	5–4	May 2023	Kangaroo Cup Gifu, Japan	W80	Hard	(United Kingdom) Katie Boulter	7–5, 6–3
Win	6–4	Jun 2024	ITF Taipei, Taiwan	W35	Hard	(Japan) Kyoka Okamura	6–4, 6–0
Loss	6–5	Oct 2024	Playford International, Australia	W75	Hard	(Australia) Maddison Inglis	6–7^{(7)}, 7–5, 1–6
Loss	6–6	Nov 2024	ITF Caloundra, Australia	W50	Hard	(Australia) Priscilla Hon	4–6, 5–7
Loss	6–7	Mar 2025	ITF Kyoto, Japan	W50	Hard (i)	(Japan) Sara Saito	4–6, 6–7^{(2)}
Loss	6–8	Mar 2025	Kōfu International Open, Japan	W50	Hard	(Japan) Haruka Kaji	6–7^{(2)}, 3–6
Loss	6–9	May 2025	Fukuoka International, Japan	W35	Carpet	(Australia) Emerson Jones	6–7^{(4)}, 4–6
Win	7–9	Aug 2025	Saskatoon Challenger, Canada	W50	Hard	(Romania) Anca Todoni	7–6^{(1)}, 6–3
Win	8–9	Nov 2025	Takasaki Open, Japan	W100	Hard	(South Korea) Ku Yeon-woo	6–3, 1–6, 6–4

=== Doubles: 5 (2 titles, 3 runner-ups) ===
Legend W100 tournaments W50 tournaments W35 tournaments W15 tournaments	Finals by surface Hard (2–2) Clay (0–1)

Result	W–L	Date	Tournament	Tier	Surface	Partner	Opponents	Score
Loss	0–1	Sep 2020	Porto Open, Portugal	W15	Hard	(Spain) Júlia Payola	(Brazil) Carolina Alves (Spain) Marina Bassols Ribera	3–6, 6–4, [7–10]
Win	1–1	Jun 2021	ITF Monastir, Tunisia	W15	Hard	(Japan) Sakura Hosogi	(United States) Emma Davis (United States) Lauren Proctor	7–5, 2–6, [10–8]
Loss	1–2	May 2024	Wiesbaden Open, Germany	W100	Clay	(Bosnia and Herzegovina) Anita Wagner	(Brazil) Laura Pigossi (United Kingdom) Samantha Murray Sharan	5–7, 2–6
Loss	1–3	Sep 2024	ITF Redding, United States	W35	Hard	(United States) Clervie Ngounoue	(United States) Ayana Akli (United States) Eryn Cayetano	2–6, 2–6
Win	2–3	Oct 2025	Rancho Santa Fe Open, United States	W50	Hard	(Japan) Wakana Sonobe	(United States) Fiona Crawley (United States) Jaeda Daniel	7–6^{(5)}, 3–6, [10–5]
