= Aoi Ito =

Japanese tennis player (born 2004)

Aoi Itō
- Native name: 伊藤 あおい
- Country (sports): Japan
- Born: 21 May 2004 (age 22) Nagoya, Japan
- Plays: Right-handed
- Prize money: $873,985

Singles
- Career record: 194–115
- Career titles: 1 WTA 125
- Highest ranking: No. 82 (18 August 2025)
- Current ranking: No. 361 (28 September 2026)

Grand Slam singles results
- Australian Open: Q1 (2025)
- French Open: Q2 (2026)
- Wimbledon: 1R (2025, 2026)
- US Open: 1R (2026)

Doubles
- Career record: 93–53
- Career titles: 9 ITF
- Highest ranking: No. 180 (16 September 2024)
- Current ranking: No. 773 (14 September 2026)
- Last updated on: 4 October 2026.

Aoi Itō (Japanese: 伊藤 あおい, Hepburn: Itō Aoi; born 21 May 2004) is a Japanese tennis player. She has been ranked by the WTA as high as No. 82 in singles, achieved on 18 August 2025, and No. 180 in doubles, reached on 16 September 2024. Ito has won one WTA 125 singles title.

== Career ==
=== 2024: WTA Tour debut and semifinals ===
In September 2024, Ito won her third singles and eighth doubles titles on the ITF Circuit at the W50 event in Nanao, Japan.

On her WTA Tour debut at the Japan Women's Open, where she qualified for the main draw, Ito reached the semifinals defeating Sofia Kenin and eighth seed Elisabetta Cocciaretto, for her first top 50 career win, and lucky loser Eva Lys, before losing in the last four to Kimberly Birrell.

=== 2025: Major & WTA 1000 debuts, first top 10 win & WTA 125 title ===
Ito won her first WTA 125 title at the Canberra International, defeating defending champion and top seed Nuria Párrizas Díaz in the semifinals and Wei Sijia in the final. As a result, she reached a new career-high ranking of 109, on 6 January 2025.

She qualified for her first WTA 1000 tournament at the Qatar Ladies Open losing to Jeļena Ostapenko in the first round. The following week, Ito qualified for the Dubai Open, but again fell in the first round, this time to Belinda Bencic.

In March 2025, she qualified for the Miami Open, but lost in the first round to Lauren Davis in three sets. She made her major debut at Wimbledon, losing to Kamilla Rakhimova in the first round.

Ito qualified for the Canadian Open and got her first WTA 1000 win by defeating Katie Volynets. She followed this up by fighting back from a set and a break of serve down against seventh seed Jasmine Paolini in the second round to register her maiden win against a top-10 ranked opponent. Ito lost in the third round to Jéssica Bouzas Maneiro in three sets.

Ranked at a new career-high of world No. 94, she qualified for the Cincinnati Open and defeated Elena-Gabriela Ruse and 27th seed Anastasia Pavlyuchenkova to reach the third round, at which point her run was ended by sixth seed Madison Keys. Despite her loss, Ito moved a further 12 places up the rankings to world No. 82 on 18 August 2025.

== WTA 125 finals ==
=== Singles: 1 (title) ===
Result	Date	Tournament	Surface	Opponent	Score
Win	Jan 2025	Canberra International, Australia	Hard	(China) Wei Sijia	6–4, 6–3

== ITF Circuit finals ==
=== Singles: 10 (4 titles, 6 runner-ups) ===
Legend
W100 tournaments
W75 tournaments
W50 tournaments
W35 tournaments
W15 tournaments

Result	W–L	Date	Tournament	Tier	Surface	Opponent	Score
Loss	0–1	Mar 2023	ITF Hinode, Japan	W15	Hard	(Japan) Natsumi Kawaguchi	4–6, 3–6
Win	1–1	Jun 2023	ITF Kashiwa, Japan	W15	Hard	(Japan) Kisa Yoshioka	6–4, 6–1
Loss	1–2	Feb 2024	Burnie International, Australia	W75	Hard	(Australia) Maya Joint	6–1, 1–6, 5–7
Loss	1–3	Mar 2024	ITF Hinode, Japan	W15	Hard	(United States) Maegan Manasse	3–6, 2–6
Loss	1–4	May 2024	ITF Goyang, South Korea	W50	Hard	(United States) Hanna Chang	6–7^{(2)}, 4–6
Win	2–4	Jun 2024	ITF Kawaguchi, Japan	W15	Hard	(Japan) Mao Mushika	6–1, 6–4
Win	3–4	Sep 2024	ITF Nanao, Japan	W50	Carpet	(Japan) Ayano Shimizu	6–2, 6–1
Loss	3–5	Nov 2024	ITF Hamamatsu, Japan	W35	Carpet	(Japan) Mei Yamaguchi	6–4, 3–5 ret.
Win	4–5	Nov 2024	Takasaki Open, Japan	W100	Hard	(China) Wei Sijia	7–5, 6–4
Loss	4–6	Jul 2025	ITF Corroios, Portugal	W50	Hard	(Russia) Vitalia Diatchenko	2–6, 3–6

=== Doubles: 17 (9 titles, 8 runner-ups) ===
Legend
W100 tournaments
W75 tournaments
W40/50 tournaments
W25/35 tournaments
W15 tournaments

Result	W–L	Date	Tournament	Tier	Surface	Partner	Opponents	Score
Loss	0–1	Jul 2022	ITF Caloundra, Australia	W15	Hard	(Japan) Nanari Katsumi	(New Zealand) Monique Barry (New Zealand) Vivian Yang	2–6, 6–7^{(5)}
Win	1–1	Jul 2022	ITF Caloundra, Australia	W15	Hard	(Japan) Nanari Katsumi	(New Zealand) Monique Barry (Australia) Stefani Webb	6–2, 6–2
Loss	1–2	Oct 2022	ITF Nanao, Japan	W25	Carpet	(Japan) Rinon Okuwaki	(Japan) Funa Kozaki (Japan) Ikumi Yamazaki	6–3, 6–7^{(5)}, [5–10]
Win	2–2	Oct 2022	ITF Hamamatsu, Japan	W25	Carpet	(Japan) Haruna Arakawa	(Japan) Erina Hayashi (Japan) Kanako Morisaki	6–1, 7–6^{(6)}
Win	3–2	Apr 2023	ITF Osaka, Japan	W15	Hard	(Japan) Mio Mushika	(South Korea) Choi Ji-hee (Chinese Taipei) Lee Ya-hsuan	6–4, 6–7^{(5)}, [10–6]
Win	4–2	Jun 2023	ITF Kawaguchi, Japan	W15	Hard	(Japan) Miyu Nakashima	(Japan) Ayumi Miyamoto (Japan) Lisa-Marie Rioux	6–4, 6–4
Win	5–2	Jul 2023	ITF Hong Kong, China SAR	W25	Hard	(Japan) Erika Sema	(Japan) Momoko Kobori (Japan) Ayano Shimizu	5–7, 6–3, [10–4]
Loss	5–3	Aug 2023	ITF Hong Kong	W40	Hard	(Japan) Erika Sema	(Japan) Momoko Kobori (Japan) Ayano Shimizu	6–3, 3–6, [9–11]
Win	6–3	Sep 2023	ITF Kyoto, Japan	W25	Hard	(Chinese Taipei) Tsao Chia-yi	(Japan) Hiromi Abe (Japan) Anri Nagata	6–2, 6–1
Win	7–3	Oct 2023	ITF Nanao, Japan	W40	Carpet	(Japan) Erika Sema	(Japan) Miho Kuramochi (Japan) Kanako Morisaki	6–2, 7–5
Loss	7–4	Oct 2023	ITF Hamamatsu, Japan	W25	Carpet	(Japan) Haruna Arakawa	(Japan) Hiromi Abe (Japan) Natsumi Kawaguchi	6–3, 4–6, [4–10]
Loss	7–5	Nov 2023	Yokohama Challenger, Japan	W40	Hard	(Japan) Natsumi Kawaguchi	(Chinese Taipei) Liang En-shuo (China) Tang Qianhui	walkover
Loss	7–6	Mar 2024	ITF Swan Hill, Australia	W35	Grass	(Australia) Alana Parnaby	(Japan) Sakura Hosogi (Japan) Misaki Matsuda	2–6, 2–6
Loss	7–7	May 2024	Fukuoka International, Japan	W75	Carpet	(Japan) Haruna Arakawa	(India) Rutuja Bhosale (New Zealand) Paige Hourigan	6–3, 3–6, [6–10]
Loss	7–8	Sep 2024	Incheon Open, South Korea	W100	Hard	(China) Feng Shuo	(China) Tang Qianhui (China) Zheng Wushuang	2–6, 3–6
Win	8–8	Sep 2024	ITF Nanao, Japan	W50	Carpet	(Japan) Naho Sato	(Japan) Momoko Kobori (Japan) Ayano Shimizu	6–1, 6–3
Win	9–8	Jun 2025	Zagreb Ladies Open, Croatia	W75	Clay	(China) Feng Shuo	(Russia) Arina Bulatova (Greece) Martha Matoula	7–5, 6–3

== Wins over top-10 players ==
- Ito's match record against players who were, at the time the match was played, ranked in the top 10.

No.	Player	Rk	Event	Surface	Rd	Score	Rk	Years	Ref
1	(Italy) Jasmine Paolini	9	Canadian Open, Montreal	Hard	2R	2–6, 7–5, 7–6^{(7–5)}	110	2025	

- Key: (Rk) first use, opponent rank; (Rd) round; (Rk) 2nd use, player rank; (Ref) reference; (F) final; (SF) semifinal; (QF) quarterfinal; (#R) rounds 4, 3, 2, 1; (RR) round-robin stage; (Q#) qualifying rounds or stages (3), 2, 1.
