= Momoko Kobori =

Japanese tennis player (born 1998)

Momoko Kobori 小堀 桃子
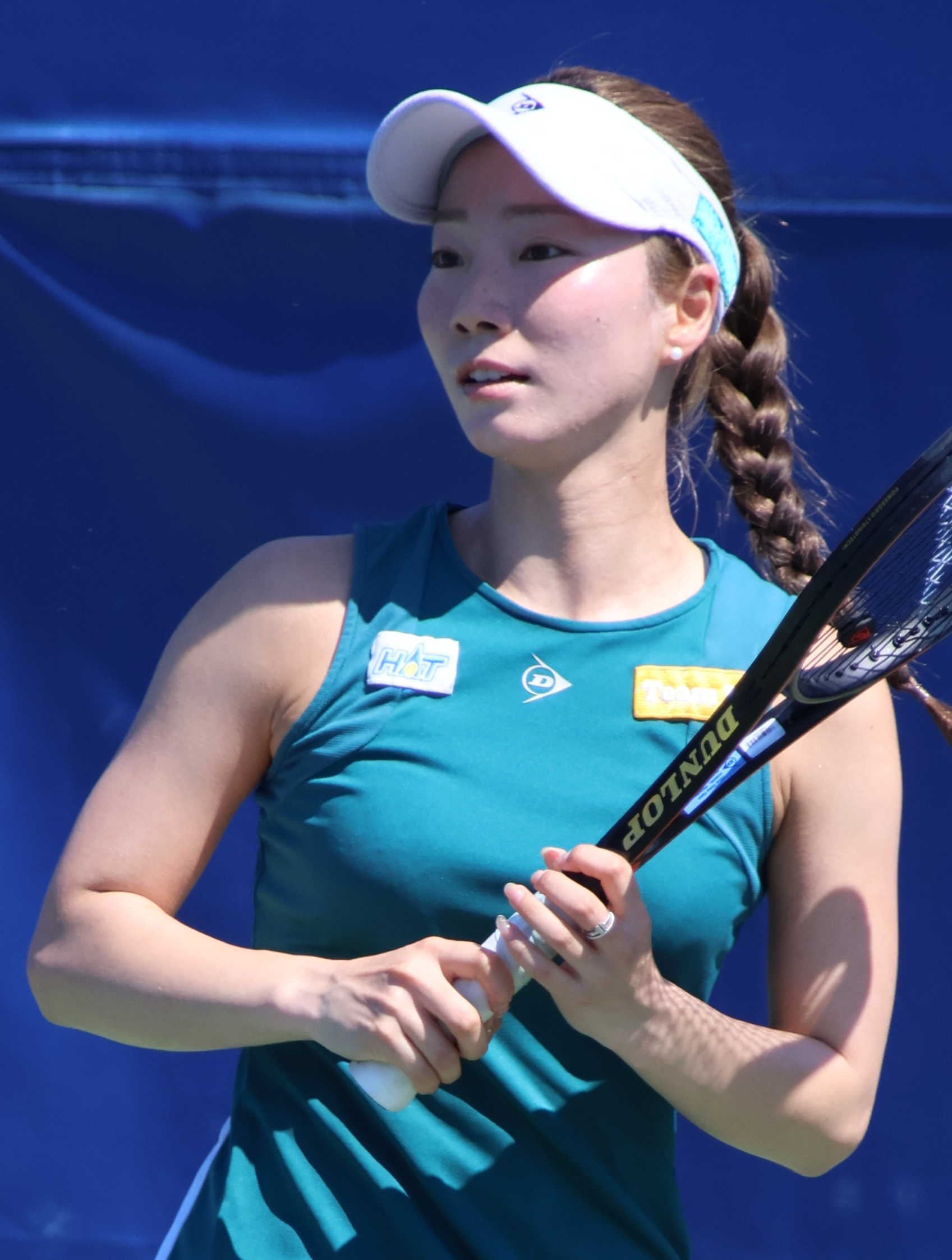
- Kobori in 2026
- Country (sports): Japan
- Born: 22 August 1998 (age 28) Saitama, Japan
- Height: 1.58 m (5 ft 2 in)
- Plays: Right (two-handed backhand)
- Coach: Takahiro Sakuma
- Prize money: $249,936

Singles
- Career record: 256–204
- Career titles: 4 ITF
- Highest ranking: No. 226 (22 April 2019)
- Current ranking: No. 368 (14 September 2026)

Doubles
- Career record: 295–170
- Career titles: 27 ITF
- Highest ranking: No. 89 (30 March 2026)
- Current ranking: No. 105 (14 September 2026)

Grand Slam doubles results
- Australian Open: 1R (2026)
- Last updated on: 14 September 2026.

Momoko Kobori (小堀 桃子, Kobori Momoko; born 22 August 1998) is a Japanese tennis player. She has career-high WTA rankings of world No. 226 in singles, achieved on 22 April 2019, and No. 89 in doubles, achieved on 30 March 2026. She has won four singles titles and 27 doubles titles on the ITF Circuit.

== Career ==
Kobori made her WTA Tour main-draw debut at the 2017 Japan Women's Open, after receiving a wildcard alongside Erina Hayashi into the doubles tournament.

Teaming up with Peangtarn Plipuech, she reached the finals at the 2025 Hong Kong Tennis Open, losing to Jiang Xinyu and Wang Yafan, and the 2026 Guadalajara Open, losing to Cristina Bucșa and Nicole Melichar-Martinez.

== WTA Tour finals ==
=== Doubles: 2 (2 runner-ups) ===
Legend WTA 1000 WTA 500 (0–1) WTA 250 (0–1)	Finals by surface Hard (0–2) Clay (0–0)

Result	W–L	Date	Tournament	Tier	Surface	Partner	Opponents	Score
Loss	0–1	Nov 2025	Hong Kong Open, China SAR	WTA 250	Hard	(Thailand) Peangtarn Plipuech	(China) Jiang Xinyu (China) Wang Yafan	4–6, 2–6
Loss	0–2	Sep 2026	Guadalajara Open, Mexico	WTA 500	Hard	(Thailand) Peangtarn Plipuech	(Spain) Cristina Bucșa (United States) Nicole Melichar-Martinez	2–6, 7–5, [5–10]

== WTA 125 finals ==
=== Doubles: 3 (3 runner-ups) ===
Result	W–L	Date	Tournament	Surface	Partner	Opponents	Score
Loss	0–1	Jul 2025	Palermo Ladies Open, Italy	Clay	(Japan) Ayano Shimizu	(France) Estelle Cascino (China) Feng Shuo	2–6, 7–6^{(7)}, [7–10]
Loss	0–2	Sep 2025	Huzhou Open, China	Clay	(Japan) Ayano Shimizu	(Slovenia) Veronika Erjavec (Kazakhstan) Zhibek Kulambayeva	4–6, 2–6
Loss	0–2	Mar 2026	Antalya Challenger, Turkey	Clay	(Thailand) Peangtarn Plipuech	Iryna Shymanovich; Maria Kozyreva	5–7, 1–6

== ITF Circuit finals ==
=== Singles: 9 (4 titles, 5 runner-ups) ===
Legend W25/35 tournaments W15 tournaments	Finals by surface Hard (1–2) Carpet (3–3)

Result	W–L	Date	Tournament	Tier	Surface	Opponent	Score
Loss	0–1	Oct 2017	ITF Makinohara, Japan	25,000	Carpet	(Japan) Ayano Shimizu	3–6, 3–6
Win	1–1	May 2018	ITF Karuizawa, Japan	25,000	Carpet	(Japan) Miyabi Inoue	6–0, 6–2
Win	2–1	Oct 2018	ITF Makinohara, Japan	25,000	Carpet	(Japan) Junri Namigata	6–2, 6–3
Loss	2–2	May 2019	ITF Karuizawa, Japan	W25	Carpet	(Serbia) Jovana Jakšić	1–6, 6–4, 5–7
Loss	2–3	Mar 2021	ITF Sharm El Sheikh, Egypt	W15	Hard	(Japan) Yuriko Miyazaki	2–6, 6–4, 3–6
Loss	2–4	Oct 2022	ITF Nanao, Japan	W25	Carpet	(Japan) Haruka Kaji	6–3, 3–6, 3–6
Win	3–4	Sep 2024	ITF Kyoto, Japan	W35	Hard (i)	(France) Tiphanie Lemaître	7–6^{(1)}, 6–2
Loss	3–5	Jun 2025	ITF Taipei, Taiwan	W35	Hard	(Indonesia) Janice Tjen	6–4, 1–6, 2–6
Win	4–5	Nov 2025	ITF Hamamatsu, Japan	W35	Carpet	(Japan) Eri Shimizu	6–2, 6–4

=== Doubles: 53 (29 titles, 24 runner-ups) ===
Legend W100 tournaments W60/75 tournaments W40/50 tournaments W25/35 tournaments W10/15 tournaments	Finals by surface Hard (20–17) Clay (4–0) Grass (1–0) Carpet (4–7)

Result	W–L	Date	Tournament	Tier	Surface	Partner	Opponents	Score
Loss	0–1	Mar 2016	ITF Nishitama, Japan	10,000	Hard	(Japan) Chihiro Muramatsu	(Japan) Robu Kajitani (Japan) Mihoki Miyahara	6–4, 2–6, [6–10]
Win	1–1	Mar 2017	ITF Nishitama, Japan	15,000	Hard	(Japan) Kotomi Takahata	(Japan) Shiho Akita (Japan) Erika Sema	6–1, 6–2
Loss	1–2	Jun 2017	ITF Tokyo, Japan	25,000	Hard	(Japan) Kotomi Takahata	(Japan) Rika Fujiwara (Japan) Kyōka Okamura	2–6, 0–6
Win	2–2	Jun 2017	Open de Montpellier, France	25,000	Clay	(Japan) Ayano Shimizu	(Brazil) Laura Pigossi (Mexico) Victoria Rodríguez	6–3, 4–6, [10–7]
Win	3–2	Jul 2017	ITF Denain, France	25,000	Clay	(Japan) Ayano Shimizu	(France) Mathilde Armitano (France) Elixane Lechemia	6–4, 6–3
Win	4–2	Oct 2017	ITF Toowoomba, Australia	25,000	Hard	(Japan) Ayano Shimizu	(Australia) Naiktha Bains (Papua New Guinea) Abigail Tere-Apisah	7–5, 7–5
Loss	4–3	Feb 2018	Burnie International, Australia	60,000	Hard	(Japan) Chihiro Muramatsu	(United States) Vania King (United Kingdom) Laura Robson	6–7^{(3)}, 1–6
Loss	4–4	Mar 2018	ITF Yokohama, Japan	25,000	Hard	(Japan) Chihiro Muramatsu	(United Kingdom) Laura Robson (Hungary) Fanny Stollár	7–5, 2–6, [4–10]
Loss	4–5	Mar 2018	Kōfu International Open, Japan	25,000	Hard	(Japan) Erina Hayashi	(China) Gao Xinyu (Thailand) Luksika Kumkhum	0–6, 6–2, [4–10]
Win	5–5	May 2018	ITF Karuizawa, Japan	25,000	Carpet	(Japan) Ayano Shimizu	(Japan) Chisa Hosonuma (Japan) Kanako Morisaki	6–0, 6–3
Win	6–5	Jul 2018	ITF Denain, France	25,000	Clay	(Japan) Ayano Shimizu	(Netherlands) Quirine Lemoine (Netherlands) Eva Wacanno	0–6, 7–5, [10–7]
Loss	6–6	Sep 2018	ITF Nanao, Japan	25,000	Carpet	(Japan) Ayano Shimizu	(Japan) Meguni Nishimoto (Japan) Kanako Morisaki	2–6, 3–6
Loss	6–7	Oct 2018	ITF Hamamatsu, Japan	25,000	Carpet	(Japan) Ayano Shimizu	(Japan) Erina Hayashi (Japan) Miharu Imanishi	5–7, 4–6
Loss	6–8	May 2019	ITF Karuizawa, Japan	W25	Carpet	(Japan) Erina Hayashi	(Japan) Ayaka Okuno (United Kingdom) Naomi Broady	3–6, 6–2, [7–10]
Loss	6–9	Jun 2019	ITF Hong Kong, China SAR	W25	Hard	(Japan) Erina Hayashi	(Japan) Junri Namigata (Papua New Guinea) Abigail Tere-Apisah	3–6, 6–2, [6–10]
Loss	6–10	Jul 2019	ITF Saskatoon, Canada	W25	Hard	(Japan) Haruka Kaji	(Chinese Taipei) Hsu Chieh-yu (Mexico) Marcela Zacarías	3–6, 2–6
Loss	6–11	Oct 2019	ITF Makinohara, Japan	W25	Carpet	(Japan) Erina Hayashi	(Hong Kong) Eudice Chong (Indonesia) Aldila Sutjiadi	7–6^{(5)}, 6–7^{(5)}, [4–10]
Loss	6–12	Jan 2020	ITF Hong Kong, China SAR	W25	Hard	(Japan) Mei Yamaguchi	(Japan) Mana Ayukawa (Hong Kong) Eudice Chong	4–6, 3–6
Win	7–12	Mar 2021	ITF Sharm El Sheikh, Egypt	W15	Hard	(Japan) Ayano Shimizu	(Slovakia) Barbora Matúšová (Russia) Anastasia Zolotareva	6–1, 6–2
Win	8–12	Mar 2021	ITF Sharm El Sheikh, Egypt	W15	Hard	(Japan) Ayano Shimizu	(United Kingdom) Alicia Barnett (Japan) Yuriko Miyazaki	6–4, 6–1
Win	9–12	Jun 2021	ITF Lisbon, Portugal	W25	Hard	(South Korea) Han Na-lae	(Brazil) Ingrid Martins (China) Ma Shuyue	6–3, 6–1
Win	10–12	Sep 2021	Caldas da Rainha Open, Portugal	W60+H	Hard	(Japan) Hiroko Kuwata	(United Kingdom) Alicia Barnett (United Kingdom) Olivia Nicholls	7–6^{(5)}, 7–6^{(2)}
Loss	10–13	Apr 2022	ITF Chiang Rai, Thailand	W25	Hard	(Thailand) Luksika Kumkhum	(Kazakhstan) Gozal Ainitdinova (Russia) Maria Timofeeva	6–2, 5–6, [4–10]
Win	11–13	Jun 2022	ITF Chiang Rai, Thailand	W25	Hard	(Thailand) Luksika Kumkhum	(Japan) Misaki Matsuda (Japan) Naho Sato	6–3, 6–3
Loss	11–14	Jun 2022	ITF Gurugram, India	W25	Hard	(Japan) Misaki Matsuda	(Japan) Saki Imamura (Indonesia) Priska Madelyn Nugroho	4–6, 5–7
Loss	11–15	Jul 2022	ITF Gurugram, India	W25	Hard	(Japan) Misaki Matsuda	(India) Ankita Raina (Indonesia) Priska Madelyn Nugroho	6–3, 0–6, [6–10]
Win	12–15	Jul 2022	ITF Nur-Sultan, Kazakhstan	W25	Hard	(India) Ankita Raina	(South Korea) Choi Ji-hee (South Korea) Han Na-lae	6–2, 3–6, [10–8]
Loss	12–16	Jul 2022	President's Cup, Kazakhstan	W60	Hard	(Japan) Moyuka Uchijima	(Russia) Mariia Tkacheva (Russia) Anastasia Zolotareva	6–4, 1–6, [6–10]
Win	13–16	Sep 2022	ITF Darwin, Australia	W25	Hard	(Thailand) Luksika Kumkhum	(Japan) Yui Chikaraishi (Japan) Nanari Katsumi	6–2, 7–6^{(3)}
Win	14–16	Oct 2022	ITF Makinohara, Japan	W25	Carpet	(Japan) Mayuka Aikawa	(Japan) Mana Ayukawa (Japan) Riko Sawayanagi	6–4, 5–7, [10–7]
Loss	14–17	Dec 2022	Indoor Tennis Championships, Japan	W60	Hard (i)	(Thailand) Luksika Kumkhum	(Chinese Taipei) Liang En-shuo (Chinese Taipei) Wu Fang-hsien	6–2, 6–7^{(5)}, [2–10]
Win	15–17	May 2023	ITF Karuizawa, Japan	W25	Grass	(Japan) Ayano Shimizu	(Australia) Talia Gibson (Japan) Akari Inoue	3–6, 7–6^{(6)}, [10–5]
Loss	15–18	Jul 2023	ITF Hong Kong, China SAR	W25	Hard	(Japan) Ayano Shimizu	(Japan) Erika Sema (Japan) Aoi Ito	7–5, 3–6, [4–10]
Win	16–18	Aug 2023	ITF Hong Kong, China SAR	W40	Hard	(Japan) Ayano Shimizu	(Japan) Erika Sema (Japan) Aoi Ito	3–6, 6–3, [11–9]
Loss	16–19	Nov 2023	Takasaki Open, Japan	W100	Hard	(Japan) Ayano Shimizu	(China) Guo Hanyu (China) Jiang Xinyu	6–7^{(5)}, 7–5, [5–10]
Loss	16–20	May 2024	Kurume Cup, Japan	W75	Carpet	(Japan) Ayano Shimizu	(United Kingdom) Madeleine Brooks (United Kingdom) Sarah Beth Grey	4–6, 0–6
Win	17–20	Aug 2024	ITF Nakhon Si Thammarat, Thailand	W15	Hard	(Japan) Natsumi Kawaguchi	(Japan) Honoka Kobayashi (Japan) Yukina Saigo	6–3, 6–4
Loss	17–21	Aug 2024	ITF Nakhon Si Thammarat, Thailand	W35	Hard	(Japan) Natsumi Kawaguchi	(Japan) Kanako Morisaki (Japan) Hikaru Sato	2–6, 3–6
Loss	17–22	Sep 2024	ITF Nanao, Japan	W50	Carpet	(Japan) Ayano Shimizu	(Japan) Aoi Ito (Japan) Naho Sato	1–6, 3–6
Loss	17–23	Nov 2024	ITF Hamamatsu, Japan	W35	Carpet	(Japan) Ayano Shimizu	(Japan) Hiromi Abe (Japan) Akiko Omae	0–6, 0–6
Win	18–23	Nov 2024	Takasaki Open, Japan	W100	Hard	(Japan) Ayano Shimizu	(Chinese Taipei) Liang En-shuo (Chinese Taipei) Tsao Chia-yi	4–6, 6–4, [10–3]
Win	19–23	Nov 2024	Yokohama Challenger, Japan	W50	Hard	(Japan) Ayano Shimizu	(Chinese Taipei) Cho I-hsuan (Chinese Taipei) Cho Yi-tsen	6–4, 7–6^{(2)}
Loss	19–24	Mar 2025	ITF Kyoto, Japan	W50	Hard (i)	(Japan) Ayano Shimizu	(Japan) Saki Imamura (South Korea) Park So-hyun	5–7, 4–6
Win	20–24	Mar 2025	Kōfu International Open, Japan	W50	Hard	(Japan) Ayano Shimizu	(Japan) Akiko Omae (Japan) Eri Shimizu	6–1, 6–4
Win	21–24	Apr 2025	ITF Osaka, Japan	W35	Hard	(Japan) Ayano Shimizu	(South Korea) Ku Yeon-woo (Indonesia) Janice Tjen	6–4, 7–5
Win	22–24	Apr 2025	Kangaroo Cup Gifu, Japan	W100	Hard	(Japan) Ayano Shimizu	(United States) Emina Bektas (United Kingdom) Lily Miyazaki	6–1, 6–2
Win	23–24	Apr 2025	Fukuoka International, Japan	W35	Hard	(Japan) Ayano Shimizu	(Japan) Miho Kuramochi (Japan) Akiko Omae	4–6, 6–2, [10–8]
Win	24–24	May 2025	Kurume Cup, Japan	W50+H	Carpet	(Japan) Ayano Shimizu	(China) Ma Yexin (China) Wang Meiling	6–1, 5–7, [10–5]
Win	25–24	Aug 2025	ITF Ourense, Spain	W50	Hard	(Japan) Ayano Shimizu	(Spain) María Martínez Vaquero (Spain) Alba Rey García	6–4, 6–1
Win	26–24	Nov 2025	Takasaki Open, Japan	W100	Hard	(Japan) Ayano Shimizu	(Chinese Taipei) Lee Ya-hsin (China) Ye Qiuyu	3–6, 7–5, [12–10]
Win	27–24	Mar 2026	Kōfu International Open, Japan	W75	Hard	(Japan) Ayano Shimizu	(China) Dang Yiming (China) You Xiaodi	6–4, 6–4
Win	28–24	Aug 2026	Hamburg Ladies & Gents Cup, Germany	W50	Clay	(Japan) Ayano Shimizu	(Ukraine) Valeriya Strakhova; Anastasia Tikhonova	6–4, 6–2
Win	29–24	Aug 2026	ITF Tianjin, China	W75	Hard	(Japan) Ayano Shimizu	(Chinese Taipei) Li Yu-yun (China) Zhang Ying	6–0, 4–6, [10–8]
