= Ayano Shimizu =

Japanese tennis player (born 1998)

Ayano Shimizu 清水 綾乃
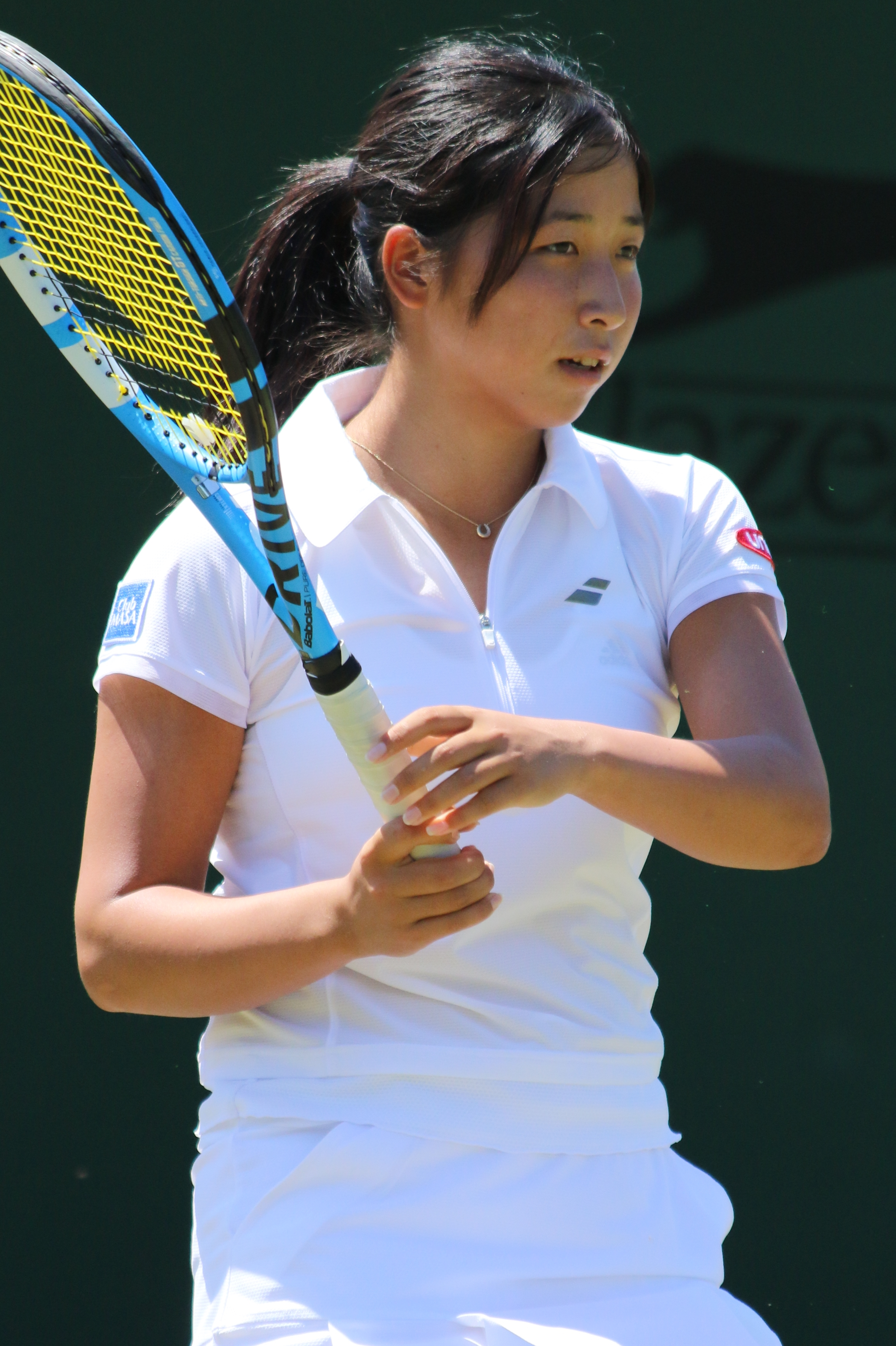
- Shimizu at the 2018 Wimbledon Championships
- Country (sports): Japan
- Born: 11 April 1998 (age 28) Maebashi, Gunma, Japan
- Plays: Right (two-handed backhand)
- Prize money: $353,568

Singles
- Career record: 298–210
- Career titles: 8 ITF
- Highest ranking: No. 175 (13 May 2019)
- Current ranking: No. 579 (31 August 2026)

Grand Slam singles results
- Australian Open: Q1 (2019)
- French Open: Q2 (2019)
- Wimbledon: Q2 (2018)
- US Open: Q2 (2018, 2019)

Doubles
- Career record: 228–132
- Career titles: 24 ITF
- Highest ranking: No. 106 (20 October 2025)
- Current ranking: No. 126 (31 August 2026)

Grand Slam doubles results
- Australian Open: 1R (2026)
- Australian Open Junior: 1R (2016)
- French Open Junior: 1R (2016)
- Last updated on: 31 August 2026.

Ayano Shimizu (清水 綾乃, Shimizu Ayano; born 11 April 1998) is a Japanese tennis player.

Shimizu has a career-high singles ranking of 175 by the WTA, reached on 13 May 2019, and a best doubles ranking of 106, achieved on 20 October 2025. Shimizu has won eight singles titles and 24 doubles titles on the ITF Women's Circuit.

She won her biggest title to date at the 2018 Kurume Cup, defeating Abbie Myers in the final.

== WTA 125 finals ==
=== Doubles: 2 (runner-ups) ===
Result	W–L	Date	Tournament	Surface	Partner	Opponents	Score
Loss	0–1	Jul 2025	Palermo Ladies Open, Italy	Clay	(Japan) Momoko Kobori	(France) Estelle Cascino (China) Feng Shuo	2–6, 7–6^{(7)}, [7–10]
Loss	0–2	Sep 2025	Huzhou Open, China	Clay	(Japan) Momoko Kobori	(Slovenia) Veronika Erjavec (Kazakhstan) Zhibek Kulambayeva	4–6, 2–6

== ITF Circuit finals ==
=== Singles: 15 (8 titles, 7 runner-ups) ===
Legend W60 tournaments (1–0) W40/50 tournaments (0–3) W25/35 tournaments (5–4) W10/15 tournaments (2–0)	Finals by surface Hard (2–1) Carpet (6–6)

Result	W–L	Date	Tournament	Tier	Surface	Opponent	Score
Win	1–0	Jul 2016	ITF Hong Kong, China	W10	Hard	(China) Tang Haochen	1–6, 6–4, 6–0
Loss	1–1	Sep 2016	ITF Noto, Japan	W25	Carpet	(Japan) Shiho Akita	4–6, 4–6
Win	2–1	May 2017	ITF Karuizawa, Japan	W25	Carpet	(Japan) Junri Namigata	0–6, 6–4, 6–4
Win	3–1	Oct 2017	ITF Makinohara, Japan	W25	Carpet	(Japan) Momoko Kobori	6–3, 6–3
Win	4–1	May 2018	Kurume Cup, Japan	W60	Carpet	(Australia) Abbie Myers	6–3, 7–5
Win	5–1	Sep 2018	ITF Nanao, Japan	W25	Carpet	(Japan) Mai Hontama	6–3, 6–1
Win	6–1	Oct 2018	ITF Hamamatsu, Japan	W25	Carpet	(Japan) Mana Ayukawa	6–3, 6–4
Loss	6–2	Sep 2019	ITF Nanao, Japan	W25	Carpet	(Japan) Junri Namigata	6–7^{(5)}, 6–4, 2–6
Loss	6–3	Oct 2023	ITF Hamamatsu, Japan	W25	Carpet	(Chinese Taipei) Joanna Garland	2–6, 6–4, 4–6
Loss	6–4	Nov 2023	Yokohama Challenger, Japan	W40	Hard	Aliona Falei	3–6, 5–7
Loss	6–5	Sep 2024	ITF Nanao, Japan	W50	Carpet	(Japan) Aoi Ito	2–6, 1–6
Win	7–5	Oct 2024	ITF Makinohara, Japan	W35	Carpet	(Japan) Miho Kuramochi	3–6, 6–3, 6–4
Win	8–5	Mar 2025	ITF Kashiwa, Japan	W15	Hard	(South Korea) Ku Yeon-woo	6–3, 6–3
Loss	8–6	May 2025	Kurume Cup, Japan	W50+H	Carpet	(Kazakhstan) Zarina Diyas	4–6, 3–6
Loss	8–7	Nov 2026	ITF Hamamatsu, Japan	W35	Carpet	(Japan) Kanon Sawashiro	1–6, 4–6

=== Doubles: 40 (26 titles, 14 runner-ups) ===
Legend W100 tournaments (4–1) W60/75 tournaments (2–3) W40/50 tournaments (6–2) W25/35 tournaments (11–7) W10/15 tournaments (3–1)	Finals by surface Hard (17–8) Clay (4–0) Carpet (4–6) Grass (1–0)

Result	W–L	Date	Tournament	Tier	Surface	Partner	Opponents	Score
Win	1–0	Jul 2016	ITF Gimcheon, South Korea	W10	Hard	(Indonesia) Jessy Rompies	(South Korea) Hong Seung-yeon (South Korea) Kang Seo-kyung	6–2, 7–5
Win	2–0	Jun 2017	Open Montpellier, France	W25+H	Clay	(Japan) Momoko Kobori	(Brazil) Laura Pigossi (Mexico) Victoria Rodriguez	6–3, 4–6, [10–7]
Win	3–0	Jul 2017	Open Denain, France	W25	Clay	(Japan) Momoko Kobori	(France) Mathilde Armitano (France) Elixane Lechemia	6–4, 6–3
Win	4–0	Oct 2017	ITF Toowoomba, Australia	W25	Hard	(Japan) Momoko Kobori	(United Kingdom) Naiktha Bains (Papua New Guinea) Abigail Tere-Apisah	7–5, 7–5
Loss	4–1	Oct 2017	ITF Makinohara, Japan	W25	Carpet	(Japan) Yukina Saigo	(Japan) Miyabi Inoue (Japan) Kotomi Takahata	3–6, 5–7
Win	5–1	May 2018	ITF Karuizawa, Japan	W25	Carpet	(Japan) Momoko Kobori	(Japan) Chisa Hosonuma (Japan) Kanako Morisaki	6–0, 6–3
Win	6–1	Jul 2018	Open Denain, France	W25	Clay	(Japan) Momoko Kobori	(Netherlands) Quirine Lemoine (Netherlands) Eva Wacanno	0–6, 7–5, [10–7]
Loss	6–2	Sep 2018	ITF Nanao, Japan	W25	Carpet	(Japan) Momoko Kobori	(Japan) Kanako Morisaki (Japan) Megumi Nishimoto	2–6, 3–6
Loss	6–3	Oct 2018	ITF Hamamatsu, Japan	W25	Carpet	(Japan) Momoko Kobori	(Japan) Erina Hayashi (Japan) Miharu Imanishi	5–7, 4–6
Loss	6–4	Mar 2021	ITF Sharm El Sheikh, Egypt	W15	Hard	(Japan) Mana Ayukawa	(Japan) Erika Sema (Czech Republic) Anna Sisková	6–1, 4–6, ret.
Win	7–4	Mar 2021	ITF Sharm El Sheikh	W15	Hard	(Japan) Momoko Kobori	(Slovakia) Barbora Matúšová (Russia) Anastasia Zolotareva	6–1, 6–2
Win	8–4	Mar 2021	ITF Sharm El Sheikh	W15	Hard	(Japan) Momoko Kobori	(United Kingdom) Alicia Barnett (Japan) Yuriko Miyazaki	6–4, 6–1
Win	9–4	May 2023	ITF Karuizawa, Japan	W25	Grass	(Japan) Momoko Kobori	(Australia) Talia Gibson (Japan) Akari Inoue	3–6, 7–6^{(6)}, [10–5]
Loss	9–5	Jul 2023	ITF Hong Kong, China	W25	Hard	(Japan) Momoko Kobori	(Japan) Aoi Ito (Japan) Erika Sema	7–5, 3–6, [4–10]
Win	10–5	Aug 2023	ITF Hong Kong	W40	Hard	(Japan) Momoko Kobori	(Japan) Aoi Ito (Japan) Erika Sema	3–6, 6–3, [11–9]
Loss	10–6	Oct 2023	Sydney Challenger, Australia	W60	Hard	(Japan) Kyōka Okamura	(Australia) Destanee Aiava (Australia) Maddison Inglis	0–6, 0–6
Loss	10–7	Nov 2023	Takasaki Open, Japan	W100	Hard	(Japan) Momoko Kobori	(China) Guo Hanyu (China) Jiang Xinyu	6–7^{(5)}, 7–5, [5–10]
Loss	10–8	Jan 2024	Burnie International, Australia	W60	Hard	(Japan) Kyōka Okamura	(New Zealand) Paige Hourigan (New Zealand) Erin Routliffe	6–7^{(5)}, 4–6
Loss	10–9	May 2024	Kurume Cup, Japan	W75	Carpet	(Japan) Momoko Kobori	(United Kingdom) Madeleine Brooks (United Kingdom) Sarah Beth Grey	4–6, 0–6
Win	11–9	Jun 2024	ITF Daegu, South Korea	W35	Hard	(Japan) Kisa Yoshioka	(South Korea) Kim Da-bin (South Korea) Kim Na-ri	6–4, 6–3
Loss	11–10	Sep 2024	ITF Nanao, Japan	W50	Carpet	(Japan) Momoko Kobori	(Japan) Aoi Ito (Japan) Naho Sato	1–6, 3–6
Loss	11–11	Nov 2024	ITF Hamamatsu, Japan	W35	Carpet	(Japan) Momoko Kobori	(Japan) Hiromi Abe (Japan) Akiko Omae	0–6, 0–6
Win	12–11	Nov 2024	Takasaki Open, Japan	W100	Hard	(Japan) Momoko Kobori	(Chinese Taipei) Liang En-shuo (Chinese Taipei) Tsao Chia-yi	4–6, 6–4, [10–3]
Win	13–11	Nov 2024	Keio Challenger, Japan	W50	Hard	(Japan) Momoko Kobori	(Chinese Taipei) Cho I-hsuan (Chinese Taipei) Cho Yi-tsen	6–4, 7–6^{(2)}
Loss	13–12	Mar 2025	ITF Kyoto, Japan	W50	Hard (i)	(Japan) Momoko Kobori	(Japan) Saki Imamura (South Korea) Park So-hyun	5–7, 4–6
Win	14–12	Mar 2025	Kōfu International Open, Japan	W50	Hard	(Japan) Momoko Kobori	(Japan) Akiko Omae (Japan) Eri Shimizu	6–1, 6–4
Win	15–12	Apr 2025	ITF Osaka, Japan	W35	Hard	(Japan) Momoko Kobori	(South Korea) Ku Yeon-woo (Indonesia) Janice Tjen	6–4, 7–5
Win	16–12	Apr 2025	Kangaroo Cup, Japan	W100	Hard	(Japan) Momoko Kobori	(United States) Emina Bektas (United Kingdom) Lily Miyazaki	6–1, 6–2
Win	17–12	Apr 2025	Fukuoka International, Japan	W35	Hard	(Japan) Momoko Kobori	(Japan) Miho Kuramochi (Japan) Akiko Omae	4–6, 6–2, [10–8]
Win	18–12	May 2025	Kurume Cup, Japan	W50+H	Carpet	(Japan) Momoko Kobori	(China) Ma Yexin (China) Wang Meiling	6–1, 5–7, [10–5]
Loss	18–13	Jun 2025	ITF Taipei, Taiwan	W35	Hard	(South Korea) Park So-hyun	(South Korea) Ku Yeon-woo (Japan) Eri Shimizu	4–6, 6–2, [5–10]
Win	19–13	Aug 2025	ITF Ourense, Spain	W50	Hard	(Japan) Momoko Kobori	(Spain) María Martínez Vaquero (Spain) Alba Rey García	6–4, 6–1
Win	20–13	Oct 2025	ITF Makinohara, Japan	W35	Carpet	(Japan) Sara Saito	(China) Chen Mengyi (Sweden) Tiana Tian Deng	6–2, 6–4
Win	21–13	Nov 2025	Takasaki Open, Japan	W100	Hard	(Japan) Momoko Kobori	(Chinese Taipei) Lee Ya-hsin (China) Ye Qiuyu	3–6, 7–5, [12–10]
Win	22–13	Mar 2026	Kōfu International Open, Japan	W75	Hard	(Japan) Momoko Kobori	(China) Dang Yiming (China) You Xiaodi	6–4, 6–4
Win	23–13	May 2026	Takasaki Open, Japan	W100	Hard	(Japan) Eri Shimizu	(Chinese Taipei) Lee Ya-hsin (Hong Kong) Cody Wong	6–1, 6–4
Loss	23–14	Jun 2026	ITF Taipei, Taiwan	W35	Hard	(Japan) Natsumi Kawaguchi	(South Korea) Back Da-yeon (Chinese Taipei) Tsao Chia-yi	5–7, 1–6
Win	24–14	Aug 2026	Hamburg Ladies & Gents Cup, Germany	W50	Clay	(Japan) Momoko Kobori	(Ukraine) Valeriya Strakhova; Anastasia Tikhonova	6–4, 6–2
Win	25–14	Aug 2026	ITF Tianjin, China	W75	Hard	(Japan) Momoko Kobori	(Chinese Taipei) Li Yu-yun (China) Zhang Ying	6–0, 4–6, [10–8]
Win	26–14	Nov 2026	ITF Hamamatsu, Japan	W35	Carpet	(Japan) Kisa Yoshioka	(Japan) Haruna Arakawa (Japan) Minami Suzuki	6–2, 6–2
