= Sara Saito =

Japanese tennis player (born 2006)

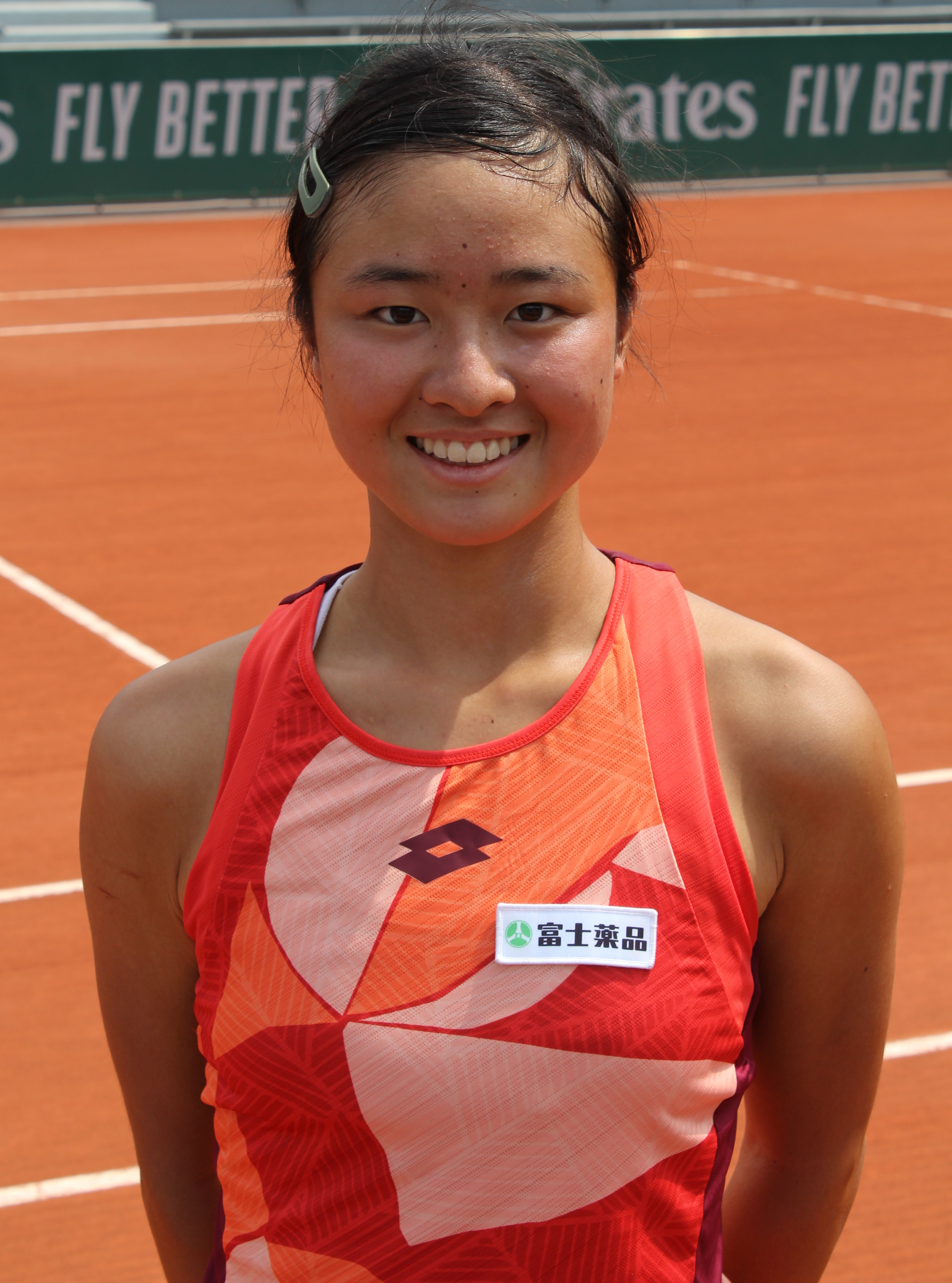
- Saito at the 2023 French Open
- Country (sports): Japan
- Born: 3 October 2006 (age 20)
- Plays: Right-handed
- Prize money: $313,618

Singles
- Career record: 129–89
- Career titles: 4 ITF
- Highest ranking: No. 150 (16 December 2024)
- Current ranking: No. 247 (2 November 2026)

Grand Slam singles results
- Australian Open: Q1 (2025)
- French Open: Q3 (2024)
- Wimbledon: Q1 (2025)
- US Open: Q1 (2024)

Doubles
- Career record: 30–35
- Career titles: 2 ITF
- Highest ranking: No. 215 (20 April 2026)
- Current ranking: No. 234 (3 August 2026)
- Last updated on: 7 August 2026.

Sara Saito (斎藤咲良, Saitō Sara; born 3 October 2006) is a Japanese tennis player. She has a career-high singles ranking of 159 WTA, achieved on 16 December 2024. On 20 April 2026, she peaked at No. 215 in the WTA doubles rankings.

== Career ==
=== 2023: Juniors ===
She has a career-high combined junior ranking of 2, achieved on 29 May 2023. She had a disappointing performance in the singles draw of the 2023 Australian Open, losing in the first round to Australian wildcard Stefani Webb. She reached the final of the doubles with fellow Japanese Hayu Kinoshita, losing to Renáta Jamrichová and Federica Urgesi. She was top seeded in the girls' singles tournament at the 2023 French Open, after winning two titles in South America.

=== 2024: First quarterfinal on WTA Tour debut ===
Saito made her WTA Tour main-draw debut as a wildcard at the 2024 Japan Women's Open, defeating Jéssica Bouzas Maneiro and fifth seed Elina Avanesyan to reach her first WTA Tour quarterfinal. Her run was ended in straight sets by Kimberly Birrell. She entered the WTA 500 Pan Pacific Open as a lucky loser, making her debut at this level but lost to qualifier and compatriot Sayaka Ishii.

== ITF Circuit finals ==
=== Singles: 7 (4 titles, 3 runner-ups) ===
Legend W100 tournaments (1–0) W75 tournaments (0–2) W50 tournaments (1–1) W25/35 tournaments (2–0)	Finals by surface Hard (1–3) Clay (1–0) Carpet (2–0)

Result	W–L	Date	Tournament	Tier	Surface	Opponent	Score
Win	1–0	Oct 2023	ITF Makinohara, Japan	W25	Carpet	(Thailand) Thasaporn Naklo	6–4, 6–3
Loss	1–1	Jan 2024	ITF Nonthaburi, Thailand	W50	Hard	(Croatia) Antonia Ružić	1–6, 3–6
Loss	1–2	Jan 2024	Burnie International, Australia	W75	Hard	(Australia) Priscilla Hon	3–6, 0–6
Win	2–2	Jun 2024	Open de Biarritz, France	W100	Clay	(France) Margaux Rouvroy	5–7, 6–3, 6–3
Win	3–2	Mar 2025	All Japan Indoor Championships	W50	Hard (i)	(Japan) Himeno Sakatsume	6–4, 7–6^{(2)}
Win	4–2	Oct 2025	ITF Makinohara, Japan	W35	Carpet	(South Korea) Back Da-yeon	6–1, 6–2
Loss	4–3	Jul 2026	Championnats de Granby, Canada	W75	Hard	(Canada) Kayla Cross	5–7, 1–6

=== Doubles: 4 (3 titles, 1 runner-up) ===
Legend W75 tournaments (1–1) W50 tournaments (1–0) W25/35 tournaments (1–0)	Finals by surface Hard (2–1) Carpet (1–0)

Result	W–L	Date	Tournament	Tier	Surface	Partner	Opponents	Score
Win	1–0	Oct 2025	ITF Makinohara, Japan	W35	Carpet	(Japan) Ayano Shimizu	(China) Chen Mengyi (Sweden) Tiana Tian Deng	6–2, 6–4
Win	2–0	Feb 2026	Queensland International, Australia	W75	Hard	(Japan) Natsumi Kawaguchi	(Australia) Gabriella Da Silva-Fick (Australia) Tenika McGiffin	6–2, 6–4
Loss	2–1	Mar 2026	All Japan Indoor Championships	W75	Hard (i)	(Japan) Hayu Kinoshita	(Belgium) Sofia Costoulas (Russia) Sofya Lansere	2–6, 4–6
Win	3–1	Nov 2026	Keio Challenger, Japan	W50	Hard	(Chinese Taipei) Li Yu-yun	(South Korea) Kim Eun-chae (Japan) Kanako Morisaki	6–4, 6–2

== Junior Grand Slam tournament finals ==
=== Doubles: 3 (3 runner-ups) ===
Result	Year	Tournament	Surface	Partner	Opponents	Score
Loss	2023	Australian Open	Hard	(Japan) Hayu Kinoshita	(Slovakia) Renáta Jamrichová (Italy) Federica Urgesi	6–7^{(5–7)}, 6–1, [7–10]
Loss	2023	French Open	Clay	(Russia) Alina Korneeva	(United States) Tyra Caterina Grant (United States) Clervie Ngounoue	3–6, 2–6
Loss	2023	US Open	Hard	(Japan) Nanaka Sato	(Russia) Anastasiia Gureva (Romania) Mara Gae	6–1, 5–7, [8–10]
