= 2025 Chennai Open =

- Date: 27 October–2 November
- Edition: 8th (2nd as Chennai Open)
- Category: WTA 250
- Draw: 32S / 16D
- Prize money: $251,750
- Surface: Hard / outdoor
- Location: Chennai, India
- Venue: SDAT Tennis Stadium, Nungambakkam

Champions

Singles
- (Indonesia) Janice Tjen

Doubles
- (Indonesia) Aldila Sutjiadi / (Indonesia) Janice Tjen
- WTA Indian Open

The 2025 Chennai Open was the second edition of the Chennai Open and the first WTA tournament in India since 2022, when the first edition of this tournament was held, marking the end of a three-year hiatus.

This tournament was part of the 2025 WTA Tour season in the 250 category and took place the week of 27 October 2025. It was played on outdoor hardcourts.

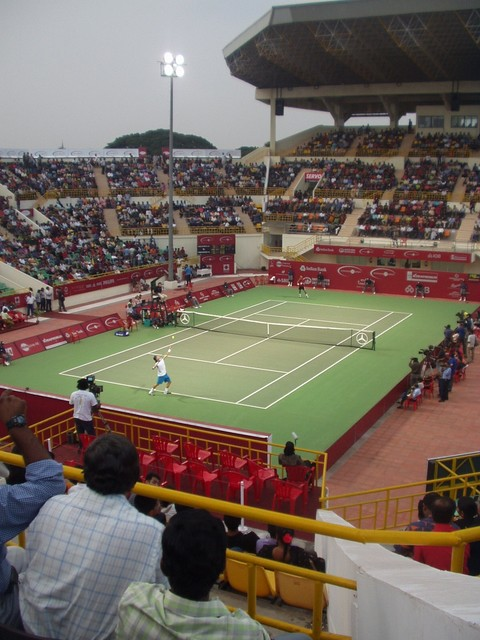
The SDAT Tennis Stadium

Czech player Linda Fruhvirtová and Canadian-Brazilian duo Gabriela Dabrowski / Luisa Stefani were the tournament’s defending singles and doubles champions, respectively, but neither Dabrowski or Stefani played on this edition, and Fruhvirtová lost in the round of sixteen to Janice Tjen.

== Finals ==
=== Singles ===
- (Indonesia) Janice Tjen defeated (Australia) Kimberly Birrell, 6–4, 6–3

=== Doubles ===
- (Indonesia) Aldila Sutjiadi / (Indonesia) Janice Tjen defeated (Australia) Storm Hunter / (Romania) Monica Niculescu 7–5, 6–4

== Singles main-draw entrants ==
=== Seeds ===
Country	Player	Rank^{1}	Seed
TUR	Zeynep Sönmez	69	1
GBR	Francesca Jones	74	2
CRO	Donna Vekić	79	3
INA	Janice Tjen	80	4
ITA	Lucia Bronzetti	91	5
~~FRA~~	~~Léolia Jeanjean~~	~~94~~	~~6~~
AUS	Kimberly Birrell	114	7
~~NZL~~	~~Lulu Sun~~	~~116~~	~~8~~
FRA	Diane Parry	125	9

- Rankings are as of 20 October 2025

=== Other entrants ===
The following players received wildcards into the singles main draw:

- (India) Shrivalli Bhamidipaty
- (Slovakia) Mia Pohánková
- (India) Maaya Rajeshwaran
- (India) Sahaja Yamalapalli

The following player received entry using a protected ranking:

- (Australia) Storm Hunter

The following players received entry from the qualifying draw:

- (Netherlands) Arianne Hartono
- (France) Astrid Lew Yan Foon
- (Germany) Caroline Werner
- (Japan) Mei Yamaguchi

The following players received entry as lucky losers:

- (India) Vaishnavi Adkar
- (Thailand) Thasaporn Naklo
- (Indonesia) Priska Nugroho
- (Australia) Arina Rodionova

=== Withdrawals ===
Before the tournament

- (Germany) Anna-Lena Friedsam → replaced by (Thailand) Thasaporn Naklo
- (France) Léolia Jeanjean → replaced by (Australia) Arina Rodionova
- (Poland) Magda Linette → replaced by (Thailand) Lanlana Tararudee
- (Germany) Tatjana Maria → replaced by (Japan) Nao Hibino
- (Latvia) Darja Semeņistaja → replaced by (Japan) Mai Hontama
- (Italy) Lucrezia Stefanini → replaced by (India) Vaishnavi Adkar
- (New Zealand) Lulu Sun → replaced by (Indonesia) Priska Nugroho

=== Retirements ===
- Alina Charaeva (heat illness)
- (United Kingdom) Francesca Jones (heat illness)
- (Serbia) Nina Stojanović (hip injury)
- Maria Timofeeva (heat illness)

== Doubles main-draw entrants ==
=== Seeds ===
Country	Player	Country	Player	Rank^{1}	Seed
AUS	Storm Hunter	ROU	Monica Niculescu	142	1
INA	Aldila Sutjiadi	INA	Janice Tjen	221	2
SLO	Dalila Jakupović	SLO	Nika Radišić	230	3
NED	Arianne Hartono	IND	Prarthana Thombare	296	4

- ^{1} Rankings are as of 20 October 2025

=== Other entrants ===
The following teams received wildcards into the doubles main draw:

- (India) Vaishnavi Adkar / (India) Maaya Rajeshwaran
- (India) Lakshmi Arunkumar / (India) Diya Ramesh

=== Withdrawals ===
During the tournament

- Polina Iatcenko / Maria Timofeeva (Timofeeva – heat illness)
