= 2025 Chennai Open – Doubles =

Doubles
- 2025 Chennai Open

Final
- Champions: (Indonesia) Aldila Sutjiadi (Indonesia) Janice Tjen
- Runners-up: (Australia) Storm Hunter (Romania) Monica Niculescu
- Score: 7–5, 6–4

Details
- Draw: 15
- Seeds: 4

Events
Singles	Doubles
← 2022 ·	WTA Indian Open	· 2026 →

Aldila Sutjiadi and Janice Tjen defeated Storm Hunter and Monica Niculescu in the final, 7–5, 6–4 to win the doubles tennis title at the 2025 Chennai Open. Tjen was the first player in tournament history to win both the singles and doubles titles in the same year.

Gabriela Dabrowski and Luisa Stefani were the reigning champions from when the tournament was last held in 2022, but they did not participate this year.

== Seeds ==
1. (Australia) Storm Hunter / (Romania) Monica Niculescu (final)
2. (Indonesia) Aldila Sutjiadi / (Indonesia) Janice Tjen (champions)
3. (Slovenia) Dalila Jakupović / (Slovenia) Nika Radišić (first round)
4. (Netherlands) Arianne Hartono / (India) Prarthana Thombare (first round)

== Draw ==
Key

- Q = Qualifier
- WC = Wild card
- LL = Lucky loser
- Alt = Alternate
- ITF = ITF entry
- PR = Protected ranking
- SR = Special ranking
- SE = Special exempt
- JE = Junior exempt
- JR = Junior Accelerator Programme entrant
- CO = College Accelerator Programme entrant
- NG = Next Gen Accelerator Program entrant
- w/o = Walkover
- r = Retired
- d = Defaulted

=== Draw ===
First round
WC	(India) L Arunkumar (India) D Ramesh	3	7	[8]
T Prozorova; E Yashina	6	5	[10]
4	(Netherlands) A Hartono (India) P Thombare	3	6^{2}
(Japan) H Kuwata (Thailand) T Naklo	6	7^{7}
(Japan) M Hontama (Japan) A Omae	7^{7}	6
(India) S Bhamidipaty (India) A Raina	6^{2}	2
P Iatcenko (Uzbekistan) M Timofeeva	3	6	[10]
(Germany) C Werner (India) S Yamalapalli	6	3	[7]
(India) R Bhatia (India) R Bhosale	6	6
3	(Slovenia) D Jakupović (Slovenia) N Radišić	2	2
WC	(India) V Adkar (India) M Rajeshwaran	6	1	[10]
A Anshba (United Kingdom) E Silva	2	6	[7]
S Lansere (Indonesia) P Nugroho	6	3	[10]
2	(Indonesia) A Sutjiadi (Indonesia) J Tjen	2	6	[12]

Quarterfinals
1	(Australia) S Hunter (Romania) M Niculescu	6	6
T Prozorova; E Yashina	2	1
(Japan) H Kuwata (Thailand) T Naklo	6^{2}	3
(Japan) M Hontama (Japan) A Omae	7^{7}	6
P Iatcenko (Uzbekistan) M Timofeeva
(India) R Bhatia (India) R Bhosale	w/o
WC	(India) V Adkar (India) M Rajeshwaran	2	1
2	(Indonesia) A Sutjiadi (Indonesia) J Tjen	6	6

Semifinals
1	(Australia) S Hunter (Romania) M Niculescu	7^{7}	6
(Japan) M Hontama (Japan) A Omae	6^{3}	4
(India) R Bhatia (India) R Bhosale	7	0	[5]
2	(Indonesia) A Sutjiadi (Indonesia) J Tjen	5	6	[10]

Final
1	(Australia) S Hunter (Romania) M Niculescu	5	4
2	(Indonesia) A Sutjiadi (Indonesia) J Tjen	7	6
