= 2025 Chennai Open – Singles =

Singles
- 2025 Chennai Open

Final
- Champion: (Indonesia) Janice Tjen
- Runner-up: (Australia) Kimberly Birrell
- Score: 6–4, 6–3

Details
- Draw: 32 (4Q / 4WC)
- Seeds: 8

Events
Singles	Doubles
- Chennai Open

Janice Tjen defeated Kimberly Birrell in the final, 6–4, 6–3 to win the singles tennis title at the 2025 Chennai Open. It was her first WTA Tour singles title. Tjen was the first Indonesian woman to win a tour-level singles title since Angelique Widjaja in 2002, and the first player in tournament history to win both the singles and doubles titles in the same year.

Linda Fruhvirtová was the defending champion from when the tournament was last held in 2022, but lost in the second round to Tjen.

The start of the main draw was disrupted due to heavy rain caused by Cyclone Montha. Play began on Wednesday after weather conditions improved.

== Seeds ==
1. (Turkey) Zeynep Sönmez (second round)
2. (United Kingdom) Francesca Jones (first round, retired)
3. (Croatia) Donna Vekić (quarterfinals)
4. (Indonesia) Janice Tjen (champion)
5. (Italy) Lucia Bronzetti (first round)
6. (France) Léolia Jeanjean (withdrew)
7. (Australia) Kimberly Birrell (final)
8. (New Zealand) Lulu Sun (withdrew)
9. (France) Diane Parry (second round)

== Draw ==
Key

- Q = Qualifier
- WC = Wild card
- LL = Lucky loser
- Alt = Alternate
- ITF = ITF entry
- PR = Protected ranking
- SR = Special ranking
- SE = Special exempt
- JE = Junior exempt
- JR = Junior Accelerator Programme entrant
- CO = College Accelerator Programme entrant
- NG = Next Gen Accelerator Program entrant
- w/o = Walkover
- r = Retired
- d = Defaulted

=== Finals ===
Semifinals
(Thailand) Lanlana Tararudee	6^{6}	6^{5}
4	(Indonesia) Janice Tjen	7^{8}	7^{7}
7	(Australia) Kimberly Birrell	6^{2}	6	7
(Chinese Taipei) Joanna Garland	7^{7}	3	5

Final
4	(Indonesia) Janice Tjen	6	6
7	(Australia) Kimberly Birrell	4	3

=== Top half ===
First round
1	(Turkey) Z Sönmez	7	6
T Prozorova	5	4
(Thailand) L Tararudee	6	2
(Uzbekistan) M Timofeeva	2	0^{r}
P Iatcenko	6	5
A Charaeva	3	0^{r}
(Poland) K Kawa	6^{9}	6	6
5	(Italy) L Bronzetti	7^{11}	0	2
4	(Indonesia) J Tjen	6	6^{5}	6
Q	(Germany) C Werner	4	7^{7}	2
Q	(France) A Lew Yan Foon	2	2
(Czech Republic) L Fruhvirtová	6	6
(Japan) N Hibino	5	1
WC	(Slovakia) M Pohánková	7	6
LL	(Thailand) T Naklo	2	0
9	(France) D Parry	6	6

Second round
1	(Turkey) Z Sönmez	6	3	3
(Thailand) L Tararudee	2	6	6
P Iatcenko	6	6
(Poland) K Kawa	2	3
4	(Indonesia) J Tjen	2	6	6
(Czech Republic) L Fruhvirtová	6	3	2
WC	(Slovakia) M Pohánková	6	6
9	(France) D Parry	3	4

Quarterfinals
(Thailand) L Tararudee	6	6
P Iatcenko	0	2
4	(Indonesia) J Tjen	6	6
WC	(Slovakia) M Pohánková	3	1

Semifinals
(Thailand) L Tararudee	6^{6}	6^{5}
4	(Indonesia) J Tjen	7^{8}	7^{7}

=== Bottom half ===
First round
7	(Australia) K Birrell	1	6	6
(Czech Republic) N Bartůňková	6	1	3
WC	(India) M Rajeshwaran	1	4
WC	(India) S Bhamidipaty	6	6
WC	(India) S Yamalapalli	6	6
LL	(Indonesia) P Nugroho	4	2
LL	(India) V Adkar	1	2
3	(Croatia) D Vekić	6	6
LL	(Australia) Ar Rodionova	6	5
(Serbia) N Stojanović	3	5^{r}
(Japan) M Hontama	7^{7}	2	4
PR	(Australia) S Hunter	6^{0}	6	6
Q	(Netherlands) A Hartono	4	3
(Chinese Taipei) J Garland	6	6
Q	(Japan) M Yamaguchi	5	6	1
2	(United Kingdom) F Jones	7	0	0^{r}

Second round
7	(Australia) K Birrell	7	7^{7}
WC	(India) S Bhamidipaty	5	6^{2}
WC	(India) S Yamalapalli	2	2
3	(Croatia) D Vekić	6	6
LL	(Australia) Ar Rodionova	1	6	7^{11}
PR	(Australia) S Hunter	6	4	6^{9}
(Chinese Taipei) J Garland	5	7	7
Q	(Japan) M Yamaguchi	7	5	5

Quarterfinals
7	(Australia) K Birrell	6	6
3	(Croatia) D Vekić	4	0
LL	(Australia) Ar Rodionova	2	6^{2}
(Chinese Taipei) J Garland	6	7^{7}

Semifinals
7	(Australia) K Birrell	6^{2}	6	7
(Chinese Taipei) J Garland	7^{7}	3	5

== Qualifying ==
=== Seeds ===
1. (Japan) Nao Hibino (moved to main draw)
2. (Japan) Mai Hontama (moved to main draw)
3. (Australia) Arina Rodionova (qualifying competition, lucky loser)
4. (Netherlands) Arianne Hartono (qualified)
5. (Japan) Mei Yamaguchi (qualified)
6. (Germany) Caroline Werner (qualified)
7. (Indonesia) Priska Nugroho (qualifying competition, lucky loser)
8. (Slovenia) Dalila Jakupović (first round)

=== Qualifiers ===
1. (Germany) Caroline Werner
2. (France) Astrid Lew Yan Foon
3. (Japan) Mei Yamaguchi
4. (Netherlands) Arianne Hartono

=== Lucky losers ===
1. (Thailand) Thasaporn Naklo
2. (India) Vaishnavi Adkar
3. (Indonesia) Priska Nugroho
4. (Australia) Arina Rodionova

=== Qualifying draw ===
==== First qualifier ====
First round
Alt	(Japan) Hiroko Kuwata	1	4
(Thailand) Thasaporn Naklo	6	6
(India) Riya Bhatia	0	2
6	(Germany) Caroline Werner	6	6

Qualifying competition
(Thailand) Thasaporn Naklo	3	6^{4}
6	(Germany) Caroline Werner	6	7^{7}

==== Second qualifier ====
First round
Alt	Amina Anshba	5	2
WC	(India) Vaishnavi Adkar	7	6
(France) Astrid Lew Yan Foon	6	6
8	(Slovenia) Dalila Jakupović	2	3

Qualifying competition
WC	(India) Vaishnavi Adkar	2	3
(France) Astrid Lew Yan Foon	6	6

==== Third qualifier ====
First round
3	(Australia) Arina Rodionova	6	6
WC	(India) Diya Ramesh	0	1
(India) Ankita Raina	1	3
5	(Japan) Mei Yamaguchi	6	6

Qualifying competition
3	(Australia) Arina Rodionova	6	4	2
5	(Japan) Mei Yamaguchi	2	6	6

==== Fourth qualifier ====
First round
4	(Netherlands) Arianne Hartono	6	6
Sofya Lansere	4	1
Ekaterina Yashina	3	2
7	(Indonesia) Priska Nugroho	6	6

Qualifying competition
4	(Netherlands) Arianne Hartono	6	6
7	(Indonesia) Priska Nugroho	2	1
