= Tennis at the 2025 SEA Games =

- Venue: National Tennis Development Center
- Location: Nonthaburi, Thailand
- Dates: 10–19 December
- Competitors: 69 from 7 nations

Tennis at the 2025 SEA Games was contested from 10 to 19 December 2025 at the National Tennis Development Center, Nonthaburi, Thailand. Seven events are featured for tennis namely: men's singles, women's singles, men's doubles, women's doubles, mixed doubles, men's team and women's team.

== Participating nations ==
- Indonesia (10)
- Laos (9)
- Malaysia (10)
- Philippines (10)
- Singapore (10)
- Thailand (10)
- Vietnam (10)

== Medal table ==
* Host nation (Thailand)

Rank	Nation	Gold	Silver	Bronze	Total
1	Thailand*	3	7	1	11
2	Indonesia	3	0	6	9
3	Philippines	1	0	4	5
4	Malaysia	0	0	3	3
Totals (4 entries)		7	7	14	28

== Medalists ==
Event	Gold	Silver	Bronze
Men's singles	Maximus Jones; Thailand	Kasidit Samrej; Thailand	Muhammad Rifqi Fitriadi; Indonesia
Men's singles	Maximus Jones; Thailand	Kasidit Samrej; Thailand	Mitsuki Wei Kang Leong; Malaysia
Women's singles	Alexandra Eala; Philippines	Mananchaya Sawangkaew; Thailand	Thasaporn Naklo; Thailand
Women's singles	Alexandra Eala; Philippines	Mananchaya Sawangkaew; Thailand	Janice Tjen; Indonesia
Men's doubles	Thailand; Maximus Jones; Pruchya Isaro	Thailand; Pawit Sornlaksup; Wishaya Trongcharoenchaikul	Indonesia; Muhammad Rifqi Fitriadi; Christopher Rungkat
Men's doubles	Thailand; Maximus Jones; Pruchya Isaro	Thailand; Pawit Sornlaksup; Wishaya Trongcharoenchaikul	Indonesia; Ignatius Anthony Susanto; Lucky Candra Kurniawan
Women's doubles	Indonesia; Aldila Sutjiadi; Janice Tjen	Thailand; Mananchaya Sawangkaew; Peangtarn Plipuech	Indonesia; Priska Madelyn Nugroho; Anjali Kirana Junarto
Women's doubles	Indonesia; Aldila Sutjiadi; Janice Tjen	Thailand; Mananchaya Sawangkaew; Peangtarn Plipuech	Philippines; Tennielle Madis; Stefi Martithe Aludo
Mixed doubles	Thailand; Pruchya Isaro; Peangtarn Plipuech	Thailand; Patcharin Cheapchandej; Pawit Sornlaksup	Indonesia; Christopher Rungkat; Aldila Sutjiadi
Mixed doubles	Thailand; Pruchya Isaro; Peangtarn Plipuech	Thailand; Patcharin Cheapchandej; Pawit Sornlaksup	Philippines; Alexandra Eala; Francis Alcantara
Men's team	Indonesia; Christopher Rungkat; Ignatius Anthony Susanto; Justin Barki; Lucky Candra Kurniawan; Muhammad Rifqi Fitriadi	Thailand; Kasidit Samrej; Maximus Jones; Pawit Sornlaksup; Pruchya Isaro; Wishaya Trongcharoenchaikul	Philippines; Alberto Lim Jr. Arthur Craig Pantino; Eric Olivarez Jr. Francis Alcantara; Ruben Gonzales
Men's team	Indonesia; Christopher Rungkat; Ignatius Anthony Susanto; Justin Barki; Lucky Candra Kurniawan; Muhammad Rifqi Fitriadi	Thailand; Kasidit Samrej; Maximus Jones; Pawit Sornlaksup; Pruchya Isaro; Wishaya Trongcharoenchaikul	Malaysia; Darrshan Suresh Kumar; Imran Daniel Abd Hazli; Koay Hao Sheng; Mitsuki Wei Kang Leong; Naufal Siddiq Kamaruzzaman
Women's team	Indonesia; Aldila Sutjiadi; Anjali Kirana Junarto; Janice Tjen; Meydiana Laviola Reinnamah; Priska Madelyn Nugroho	Thailand; Lanlana Tararudee; Mananchaya Sawangkaew; Patcharin Cheapchandej; Peangtarn Plipuech; Thasaporn Naklo	Philippines; Alexandra Eala; Alexa Joy Milliam; Shaira Rivera; Stefi Martithe Aludo; Tennielle Madis
Women's team	Indonesia; Aldila Sutjiadi; Anjali Kirana Junarto; Janice Tjen; Meydiana Laviola Reinnamah; Priska Madelyn Nugroho	Thailand; Lanlana Tararudee; Mananchaya Sawangkaew; Patcharin Cheapchandej; Peangtarn Plipuech; Thasaporn Naklo	Malaysia; Daania Danielle Abd Hazli; Hannah Seen Ean Yip; Sharifah Elsa Wan Abd Rahman; Shihomi Li Xuan Leong; Zan Ning Lim
