= 2020 Billie Jean King Cup Asia/Oceania Zone Group I – Pool A =

Subsection of tennis competition

Pool A of the 2020 Billie Jean King Cup Asia/Oceania Zone Group I was the only pool in the Asia/Oceania zone of the 2020–21 Billie Jean King Cup. Six teams competed in a round robin competition and the top two teams advanced to Play-offs, while the bottom two teams were relegated to Group II. The event was moved and postponed a month from Dongguan, China to Dubai, United Arab Emirates due to the COVID-19 pandemic.

== Standings ==
		CHN	IND	KOR	INA	TPE	UZB	RR; W–L	Set; W–L	Game; W–L	Standings
1	China		3–0	3–0	3–0	3–0	2–1	14–1	27–4 (87%)	180–87 (67%)	1
5	India	0–3		2–1	2–1	2–1	3–0	9–6	21–14 (60%)	168–157 (52%)	2
2	South Korea	0–3	1–2		2–1	1–2	3–0	7–8	13–17 (43%)	138–145 (49%)	3
6	Indonesia	0–3	1–2	1–2		2–1	3–0	7–8	14–20 (41%)	146–158 (48%)	4
3	Chinese Taipei	0–3	1–2	2–1	1–2		2–1	6–9	17–19 (47%)	158–169 (48%)	5
4	Uzbekistan	1–2	0–3	0–3	0–3	1–2		2–13	7–25 (22%)	107–181 (37%)	6

Standings are determined by: 1. number of wins; 2. number of matches; 3. in two-team ties, head-to-head records; 4. in three-team ties, (a) percentage of matches won (head-to-head records if two teams remain tied), then (b) percentage of sets won (head-to-head records if two teams remain tied), then (c) percentage of games won (head-to-head records if two teams remain tied), then (d) Billie Jean King Cup rankings.

== Round-robin ==
=== China vs. India ===
China
3
Aviation Club Tennis Centre, Dubai, United Arab Emirates
3 March 2020
Hard

India
0

			1	2	3
1	(China) (India)	Zhang Shuai; Rutuja Bhosale	6; 4	6; 2
2	(China) (India)	Wang Qiang; Ankita Raina	1; 6	6; 2	6; 4
3	(China) (India)	Peng Shuai / Xu Yifan; Sowjanya Bavisetti / Riya Bhatia	6; 0	6; 1

=== South Korea vs. Uzbekistan ===
South Korea
3
Aviation Club Tennis Centre, Dubai, United Arab Emirates
3 March 2020
Hard

Uzbekistan
0

			1	2	3
1	(South Korea) (Uzbekistan)	Jang Su-jeong; Akgul Amanmuradova	6; 3	6; 4
2	(South Korea) (Uzbekistan)	Han Na-lae; Sabina Sharipova	5; 7	6; 4	6; 3
3	(South Korea) (Uzbekistan)	Choi Ji-hee / Kim Na-ri; Nigina Abduraimova / Akgul Amanmuradova	6; 1	6; 3

=== Chinese Taipei vs. Indonesia ===
Chinese Taipei
1
Aviation Club Tennis Centre, Dubai, United Arab Emirates
3 March 2020
Hard

Indonesia
2

			1	2	3
1	(Chinese Taipei) (Indonesia)	Yang Ya-yi; Priska Madelyn Nugroho	4; 6	7^{12} 6^{10}	0; 6
2	(Chinese Taipei) (Indonesia)	Liang En-shuo; Aldila Sutjiadi	2; 6	6; 4	2; 6
3	(Chinese Taipei) (Indonesia)	Latisha Chan / Yang Ya-yi; Priska Madelyn Nugroho / Aldila Sutjiadi	7; 5	7; 5

=== Chinese Taipei vs. South Korea ===
Chinese Taipei
2
Aviation Club Tennis Centre, Dubai, United Arab Emirates
4 March 2020
Hard

South Korea
1

			1	2	3
1	(Chinese Taipei) (South Korea)	Yang Ya-yi; Jang Su-jeong	3; 6	1; 6
2	(Chinese Taipei) (South Korea)	Liang En-shuo; Han Na-lae	6; 4	6; 2
3	(Chinese Taipei) (South Korea)	Chan Hao-ching / Latisha Chan; Han Na-lae / Kim Na-ri	6; 3	6; 3

=== India vs. Uzbekistan ===
India
3
Aviation Club Tennis Centre, Dubai, United Arab Emirates
4 March 2020
Hard

Uzbekistan
0

			1	2	3
1	(India) (Uzbekistan)	Rutuja Bhosale; Akgul Amanmuradova	2; 6	6; 2	7; 5
2	(India) (Uzbekistan)	Ankita Raina; Sabina Sharipova	7; 5	6; 1
3	(India) (Uzbekistan)	Sowjanya Bavisetti / Riya Bhatia; Yasmina Karimjanova / Setora Normurodova	6; 3	6; 1

=== China vs. Indonesia ===
China
3
Aviation Club Tennis Centre, Dubai, United Arab Emirates
4 March 2020
Hard

Indonesia
0

			1	2	3
1	(China) (Indonesia)	Zheng Saisai; Janice Tjen	6; 1	6; 1
2	(China) (Indonesia)	Wang Qiang; Aldila Sutjiadi	6; 3	6; 3
3	(China) (Indonesia)	Xu Yifan / Zhang Shuai; Priska Madelyn Nugroho / Janice Tjen	6; 1	6; 4

=== China vs. Chinese Taipei ===
China
3
Aviation Club Tennis Centre, Dubai, United Arab Emirates
5 March 2020
Hard

Chinese Taipei
0

			1	2	3
1	(China) (Chinese Taipei)	Zheng Saisai; Yang Ya-yi	6; 1	6; 2
2	(China) (Chinese Taipei)	Wang Qiang; Liang En-shuo	6; 3	6; 3
3	(China) (Chinese Taipei)	Peng Shuai / Xu Yifan; Latisha Chan / Yang Ya-yi	4; 6	6; 1	6; 4

=== India vs. South Korea ===
India
2
Aviation Club Tennis Centre, Dubai, United Arab Emirates
5 March 2020
Hard

South Korea
1

			1	2	3
1	(India) (South Korea)	Rutuja Bhosale; Jang Su-jeong	7; 5	6; 4
2	(India) (South Korea)	Ankita Raina; Han Na-lae	4; 6	0; 6
3	(India) (South Korea)	Sania Mirza / Ankita Raina; Han Na-lae / Kim Na-ri	6; 4	6; 4

=== Indonesia vs. Uzbekistan ===
Indonesia
3
Aviation Club Tennis Centre, Dubai, United Arab Emirates
5 March 2020
Hard

Uzbekistan
0

			1	2	3
1	(Indonesia) (Uzbekistan)	Priska Madelyn Nugroho; Nigina Abduraimova	6; 0	6; 4
2	(Indonesia) (Uzbekistan)	Aldila Sutjiadi; Akgul Amanmuradova	3; 6	7; 5	6; 4
3	(Indonesia) (Uzbekistan)	Priska Madelyn Nugroho / Janice Tjen; Yasmina Karimjanova / Setora Normurodova	6; 1	6; 3

=== China vs. Uzbekistan ===
China
2
Aviation Club Tennis Centre, Dubai, United Arab Emirates
6 March 2020
Hard

Uzbekistan
1

			1	2	3
1	(China) (Uzbekistan)	Zheng Saisai; Yasmina Karimjanova	6; 0	6; 1
2	(China) (Uzbekistan)	Wang Qiang; Sabina Sharipova	6; 1	6; 3
3	(China) (Uzbekistan)	Peng Shuai / Xu Yifan; Yasmina Karimjanova / Setora Normurodova	5; 2			retired

Notes. Due to China's retirement from the doubles rubber, the scores are counted as 7–5, 6–0 win for Uzbekistan.

=== Chinese Taipei vs. India ===
Chinese Taipei
1
Aviation Club Tennis Centre, Dubai, United Arab Emirates
6 March 2020
Hard

India
2

			1	2	3
1	(Chinese Taipei) (India)	Yang Ya-yi; Rutuja Bhosale	3; 6	6; 3	6^{6} 7^{8}
2	(Chinese Taipei) (India)	Liang En-shuo; Ankita Raina	3; 6	6; 2	6; 3
3	(Chinese Taipei) (India)	Latisha Chan / Liang En-shuo; Sania Mirza / Ankita Raina	4; 6	6; 4	4; 6

=== Indonesia vs. South Korea ===
Indonesia
1
Aviation Club Tennis Centre, Dubai, United Arab Emirates
6 March 2020
Hard

South Korea
2

			1	2	3
1	(Indonesia) (South Korea)	Priska Madelyn Nugroho; Jang Su-jeong	5; 7	3; 6
2	(Indonesia) (South Korea)	Aldila Sutjiadi; Han Na-lae	4; 6	1; 6
3	(Indonesia) (South Korea)	Aldila Sutjiadi / Janice Tjen; Choi Ji-hee / Kim Na-ri	6; 2	6; 0

=== China vs. South Korea ===
China
3
Aviation Club Tennis Centre, Dubai, United Arab Emirates
7 March 2020
Hard

South Korea
0

			1	2	3
1	(China) (South Korea)	Zheng Saisai; Jang Su-jeong	6; 1	6; 0
2	(China) (South Korea)	Zhang Shuai; Han Na-lae	6; 3	7; 5
3	(China) (South Korea)	Peng Shuai / Xu Yifan; Choi Ji-hee / Kim Da-bin	6; 2	7^{8} 6^{6}

=== Chinese Taipei vs. Uzbekistan ===
Chinese Taipei
2
Aviation Club Tennis Centre, Dubai, United Arab Emirates
7 March 2020
Hard

Uzbekistan
1

			1	2	3
1	(Chinese Taipei) (Uzbekistan)	Yang Ya-yi; Setora Normurodova	6; 3	6; 0
2	(Chinese Taipei) (Uzbekistan)	Liang En-shuo; Sabina Sharipova	2; 6	5; 7
3	(Chinese Taipei) (Uzbekistan)	Chan Hao-ching / Latisha Chan; Nigina Abduraimova / Akgul Amanmuradova	6; 0	6; 2

=== India vs. Indonesia ===
India
2
Aviation Club Tennis Centre, Dubai, United Arab Emirates
7 March 2020
Hard

Indonesia
1

			1	2	3
1	(India) (Indonesia)	Rutuja Bhosale; Priska Madelyn Nugroho	3; 6	6; 0	3; 6
2	(India) (Indonesia)	Ankita Raina; Aldila Sutjiadi	6; 3	6; 3
3	(India) (Indonesia)	Sania Mirza / Ankita Raina; Priska Madelyn Nugroho / Aldila Sutjiadi	7^{7} 6^{4}	6; 0
