= Janice Tjen =

Indonesian tennis player (born 2002)

- Country (sports): Indonesia
- Born: 6 May 2002 (age 24) Jakarta, Indonesia
- Height: 1.71 m (5 ft 7 in)
- Turned pro: 2024
- Plays: Right-handed (two-handed backhand)
- College: University of Oregon (2020–2021); Pepperdine University (2021–2024)
- Coach: Chris Bint
- Prize money: US $1,226,335

Singles
- Career record: 136–44
- Career titles: 1
- Highest ranking: No. 35 (24 August 2026)
- Current ranking: No. 60 (9 November 2026)

Grand Slam singles results
- Australian Open: 2R (2026)
- French Open: 1R (2026)
- Wimbledon: 2R (2026)
- US Open: 2R (2025)

Doubles
- Career record: 90–39
- Career titles: 4
- Highest ranking: No. 38 (19 October 2026)
- Current ranking: No. 38 (19 October 2026)

Grand Slam doubles results
- Australian Open: 1R (2026)
- French Open: 1R (2026)
- Wimbledon: 2R (2026)
- US Open: 2R (2026)

Team competitions
- BJK Cup: 8–2
Medal record
Women's Tennis
Representing Indonesia
Asian Games
Bronze medal – third place	2022 Hangzhou	Doubles
SEA Games
Gold medal – first place	2025 Thailand	Doubles
Gold medal – first place	2025 Thailand	Team
Bronze medal – third place	2025 Thailand	Singles
ASEAN School Games
Gold medal – first place	2019 Semarang	Singles
Gold medal – first place	2019 Semarang	Team
Silver medal – second place	2019 Semarang	Doubles
- Last updated on: 24 October 2026.

Janice Tjen (born 6 May 2002) is an Indonesian professional tennis player. She reached career-high WTA rankings of world No. 35 in singles on 24 August 2026 and No. 39 in doubles on 3 August 2026. She has been Indonesia's highest-ranked woman in singles since May 2025, and her singles peak is the second highest achieved by an Indonesian woman, after Yayuk Basuki.

Tjen has won one singles title and three doubles titles on the WTA Tour, as well as one singles title and two doubles titles at WTA 125 level, and thirteen singles titles and six doubles titles on the ITF Circuit. At the 2025 Chennai Open, she became the first Indonesian player in 23 years to win a WTA Tour singles title. She also won the doubles title with compatriot Aldila Sutjiadi, becoming the third player that season to sweep the singles and doubles titles at the same tournament.

At the 2025 US Open, Tjen became the first Indonesian player to appear in a Grand Slam singles main draw since Angelique Widjaja at the 2004 US Open, ending a 21-year absence. By defeating 24th seed Veronika Kudermetova in the first round, she also became the first Indonesian to win a Grand Slam singles match since Widjaja at Wimbledon in 2003.

Representing Indonesia, Tjen won the women's doubles bronze medal at the 2022 Asian Games alongside Sutjiadi. At the 2025 SEA Games, she won gold medals in the women's team and women's doubles events, and a bronze medal in women's singles.

== Early life ==
Tjen was born in Jakarta, Indonesia. She was persuaded to take up tennis by Priska Madelyn Nugroho, a friend and one of the top Indonesian junior players at the time. The high costs involved with turning professional meant that Tjen and her parents decided to develop her skills through college tennis first; Tjen played at the University of Oregon, then transferred to Pepperdine University in 2021, graduating in 2024 with a degree in sociology.

== Junior Grand Slam performance ==
Singles:

- Australian Open: Q1 (2019)

== Career ==
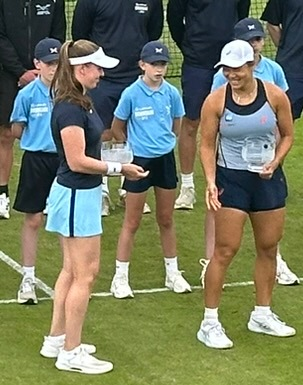
2026 Birmingham Open doubles champions Gibson and Tjen (right)

Tjen was selected to represent Indonesia at the 2022 Asian Games and won the bronze medal in doubles while partnered with Aldila Sutjiadi.

In August 2025, Tjen qualified for her first Grand Slam main draw with a straight sets win over third qualifying seed Aoi Ito at the 2025 US Open. She became the first Indonesian player in a major since Angelique Widjaja at the 2004 US Open. In the first round, she defeated 24th seed Veronika Kudermetova in three sets, becoming the first Indonesian woman to win a Grand Slam match since Widjaja at the 2003 Wimbledon Championships. Tjen lost in the second round to Emma Raducanu in straight sets.

In September 2025, on her WTA 250 debut at the São Paulo Open, Tjen became the first Indonesian woman to reach a WTA quarterfinal since Angelique Widjaja at the 2004 Wismilak International. After defeating third-seed Alexandra Eala in the quarterfinals and sixth-seed Francesca Jones in the semifinals, Tjen became the first Indonesian player to reach a WTA final since Widjaja in 2002. She lost the final to Tiantsoa Sarah Rakotomanga Rajaonah.

In October 2025, partnering Aldila Sutjiadi, she won her first WTA 125 doubles title at the Suzhou Open, defeating Katarzyna Kawa and Makoto Ninomiya in the final. Tjen reached the top 100 on 6 October 2025 and became the sixth Indonesian to reach the milestone. She won her maiden WTA 125 singles title at the Jinan Open, overcoming Anna Bondár in the final. Teaming with Katarzyna Piter, Tjen won her first WTA 250 doubles title at the Guangzhou Open, defeating Eudice Chong and Liang En-shuo in the final which went to a deciding champions tiebreak.

At the 2025 Chennai Open, she won her maiden WTA Tour singles title, defeating Kimberly Birrell in the final and then teamed with Aldila Sutjiadi to claim the tournament's doubles crown, overcoming top seeds and former world no. 1 Storm Hunter and Monica Niculescu in the championship match. As a result, Tjen climbed 29 places in the singles rankings to a new career-high of world No. 53 on 3 November 2025.

Teaming up with Talia Gibson, she won her second WTA 125 doubles title at the grass court 2026 Birmingham Open.

== Performance timelines ==
Key
W	F	SF	QF	#R	RR	Q#	P#	DNQ	A	Z#	PO	G	S	B	NMS	NTI	P	NH

(W) winner; (F) finalist; (SF) semifinalist; (QF) quarterfinalist; (#R) rounds 4, 3, 2, 1; (RR) round-robin stage; (Q#) qualification round; (P#) preliminary round; (DNQ) did not qualify; (A) absent; (Z#) Davis/Fed Cup Zonal Group (with number indication) or (PO) play-off; (G) gold, (S) silver or (B) bronze Olympic/Paralympic medal; (NMS) not a Masters tournament; (NTI) not a Tier I tournament; (P) postponed; (NH) not held; (SR) strike rate (events won / competed); (W–L) win–loss record.
To avoid confusion and double counting, these charts are updated at the conclusion of a tournament or when the player's participation has ended.

=== Singles ===
Current through the 2026 US Open.

Tournament	2020	2021	2022	2023	2024	2025	2026	SR	W–L	Win%
Grand Slam tournaments
Australian Open	A	A	A	A	A	A	2R	0 / 1	1–1	50%
French Open	A	A	A	A	A	A	1R	0 / 1	0–1	0%
Wimbledon	NH	A	A	A	A	A	2R	0 / 1	1–1	50%
US Open	A	A	A	A	A	2R	1R	0 / 2	1–2	33%
Win–loss	0–0	0–0	0–0	0–0	0–0	1–1	2–4	0 / 5	3–5	38%
National representation
Billie Jean King Cup	G1		A	A	A	A		0 / 1	0–1	0%
WTA 1000 tournaments
Qatar Open	A	NTI	A	NTI	A	A	2R	0 / 1	1–1	50%
Dubai Championships	NTI	A	NTI	A	A	A	3R	0 / 1	2–1	67%
Indian Wells Open	NH	A	A	A	A	A	1R	0 / 1	0–1	0%
Miami Open	NH	A	A	A	A	A	1R	0 / 1	0–1	0%
Madrid Open	NH	A	A	A	A	A	2R	0 / 1	1–1	50%
Italian Open	A	A	A	A	A	A	1R	0 / 1	0–1	0%
Canadian Open	NH	A	A	A	A	A	1R	0 / 1	0–1	0%
Cincinnati Open	A	A	A	A	A	A	3R	1 / 1	1–1	–
Beijing Open	Not Held			A	A	1R		0 / 1	0–1	0%
Wuhan Open	Not Held				A	A		0 / 0	0–0	–
Win–loss	0–0	0–0	0–0	0–0	0–0	0–1	4–7	0 / 4	4–8	33%
Career statistics
	2020	2021	2022	2023	2024	2025	2026	Career		
Tournaments	1	0	0	0	0	4	12	Career total: 13		
Titles	0	0	0	0	0	1	0	Career total: 1		
Finals	0	0	0	0	0	2	0	Career total: 2		
Overall win–loss	0–1	0–0	0–0	0–0	0–0	10–3	6–12	16–15		
Win %	0%	–	–	–	–	77%	33%	Career total: 52%		
Year-end ranking	–	–	966	–	578	53		$814,958		

=== Doubles ===
Current through the 2026 US Open.

Tournament	2026	SR	W–L	Win%
Grand Slam tournaments
Australian Open	1R	0 / 1	0–1	0%
French Open	1R	0 / 1	0–1	0%
Wimbledon	2R	0 / 1	1–1	50%
US Open	2R	0 / 1	1–1	50%
Win–loss	2–4	0 / 4	2–4	33%

== WTA Tour finals ==
=== Singles: 3 (1 title, 2 runner-ups) ===
Legend WTA 250 (1–2)	Finals by surface Hard (1–2)	Finals by setting Outdoor (1–2)

Result	W–L	Date	Tournament	Tier	Surface	Opponent	Score
Loss	0–1	Sep 2025	SP Open, Brazil	WTA 250	Hard	(France) Tiantsoa Rakotomanga Rajaonah	3–6, 4–6
Win	1–1	Oct 2025	Chennai Open, India	WTA 250	Hard	(Australia) Kimberly Birrell	6–4, 6–3
Loss	1–2	Nov 2026	Chennai Open, India	WTA 250	Hard	(Poland) Magda Linette	7–5, 1–6, 4–6

=== Doubles: 4 (4 titles) ===
Legend WTA 250 (4–0)	Finals by surface Hard (4–0)	Finals by setting Outdoor (4–0)

Result	W–L	Date	Tournament	Tier	Surface	Partner	Opponents	Score
Win	1–0	Oct 2025	Guangzhou Open, China	WTA 250	Hard	(Poland) Katarzyna Piter	(Hong Kong) Eudice Chong (Chinese Taipei) Liang En-shuo	3–6, 6–3, [10–5]
Win	2–0	Oct 2025	Chennai Open, India	WTA 250	Hard	(Indonesia) Aldila Sutjiadi	(Australia) Storm Hunter (Romania) Monica Niculescu	7–5, 6–4
Win	3–0	Jan 2026	Hobart International, Australia	WTA 250	Hard	(Poland) Katarzyna Piter	(Belgium) Magali Kempen (Czech Republic) Anna Sisková	6–2, 6–2
Win	4–0	Oct 2026	Japan Women's Open, Japan	WTA 250	Hard	(Australia) Storm Hunter	(Czech Republic) Jesika Malečková (Czech Republic) Miriam Škoch	6–4, 6–1

== WTA 125 finals ==
=== Singles: 1 (title) ===
Result	Date	Tournament	Surface	Opponent	Score
Win	Oct 2025	Jinan Open, China	Hard	(Hungary) Anna Bondár	6–4, 4–6, 6–4

=== Doubles: 2 (2 titles) ===
Result	W–L	Date	Tournament	Surface	Partner	Opponents	Score
Win	1–0	Oct 2025	Suzhou Ladies Open, China	Hard	(Indonesia) Aldila Sutjiadi	(Poland) Katarzyna Kawa (Japan) Makoto Ninomiya	6–4, 6–3
Win	2–0	Jun 2026	Birmingham Open, United Kingdom	Grass	(Australia) Talia Gibson	(United Kingdom) Harriet Dart (United Kingdom) Maia Lumsden	6–4, 6–3

== ITF Circuit finals ==
=== Singles: 16 (13 titles, 3 runner-ups) ===
Legend W100 tournaments (0–1) W75 tournaments (0–1) W50 tournaments (1–0) W35 tournaments (5–1) W15 tournaments (7–0)	Finals by surface Hard (11–3) Clay (2–0)

Result	W-L	Date	Tournament	Tier	Surface	Opponent	Score
Win	1–0	Jun 2024	ITF Monastir, Tunisia	W15	Hard	(Lithuania) Patricija Paukštytė	6–1, 7–6^{(1)}
Win	2–0	Jun 2024	ITF Monastir, Tunisia	W15	Hard	Anna Kubareva	6–2, 6–3
Win	3–0	Jun 2024	ITF Monastir, Tunisia	W15	Hard	(France) Marine Szostak	6–1, 6–0
Win	4–0	Aug 2024	ITF Wanfercée-Baulet, Belgium	W15	Clay	(Luxembourg) Marie Weckerle	6–2, 6–2
Win	5–0	Nov 2024	ITF Antalya, Turkey	W15	Clay	(Canada) Nadia Lagaev	6–1, 6–2
Win	6–0	Dec 2024	ITF Wellington, New Zealand	W15	Hard	(Japan) Shiho Akita	6–4, 6–4
Win	7–0	Dec 2024	ITF Tauranga, New Zealand	W35	Hard	(Japan) Hiromi Abe	6–2, 6–1
Loss	7–1	Apr 2025	ITF Goyang, South Korea	W35	Hard	(Japan) Rina Saigo	6–2, 4–6, 1–6
Win	8–1	May 2025	ITF Goyang, South Korea	W35	Hard	(China) Zhu Lin	6–4, 6–1
Win	9–1	May 2025	ITF Andong, South Korea	W35	Hard	(China) Ma Yexin	6–4, 6–2
Win	10–1	Jun 2025	ITF Maanshan, China	W15	Hard	Kira Pavlova	6–4, 6–1
Win	11–1	Jun 2025	ITF Luzhou, China	W35	Hard	(China) Liu Fangzhou	6–0, 6–4
Win	12–1	Jun 2025	ITF Taizhou, China	W50	Hard	(China) Yang Yidi	7–5, 6–3
Win	13–1	Jun 2025	ITF Taipei, Taiwan	W35	Hard	(Japan) Momoko Kobori	4–6, 6–1, 6–2
Loss	13–2	Jul 2025	Lexington Open, United States	W75	Hard	(China) Wang Xiyu	6–3, 2–6, 4–6
Loss	13–3	Aug 2025	Landisville Challenge, United States	W100	Hard	(Croatia) Petra Marčinko	6–7^{(4)}, 6–3, 4–6

=== Doubles: 11 (6 titles, 5 runner-ups) ===
Legend W50 tournaments (1–0) W35 tournaments (3–2) W15 tournaments (2–3)	Finals by surface Hard (5–4) Clay (1–1)

Result	W–L	Date	Tournament	Tier	Surface	Partner	Opponents	Score
Win	1–0	Jun 2024	ITF Monastir, Tunisia	W15	Hard	(Canada) Leena Bennetto	(Lithuania) Patricija Paukštytė (Slovakia) Alica Rusová	6–4, 6–1
Loss	1–1	Jun 2024	ITF Monastir, Tunisia	W15	Hard	(Australia) Ella Simmons	(Kyrgyzstan) Vladislava Andreevskaya; Anastasia Gasanova	2–6, 4–6
Loss	1–2	Aug 2024	ITF Wanfercée-Baulet, Belgium	W15	Clay	(Australia) Ella Simmons	(Belgium) Kaat Coppez (Belgium) Romane Longueville	4–6, 6–7^{(3)}
Win	2–2	Nov 2024	ITF Antalya, Turkey	W15	Clay	(Chinese Taipei) Madeleine Jessup	(Romania) Ștefania Bojică (Romania) Briana Szabó	7–5, 4–6, [11–9]
Loss	2–3	Feb 2025	Arcadia Women's Pro Open, United States	W35	Hard	(Indonesia) Aldila Sutjiadi	(United States) Victoria Osuigwe (United States) Alana Smith	3–6, 4–6
Loss	2–4	Apr 2025	ITF Osaka, Japan	W35	Hard	(South Korea) Ku Yeon-woo	(Japan) Momoko Kobori (Japan) Ayano Shimizu	4–6, 5–7
Win	3–4	Apr 2025	ITF Goyang, South Korea	W35	Hard	(Japan) Saki Imamura	(South Korea) Kim Na-ri (Thailand) Punnin Kovapitukted	4–6, 6–0, [10–5]
Loss	3–5	Jun 2025	ITF Maanshan, China	W15	Hard	(Indonesia) Priska Madelyn Nugroho	Anastasiia Grechkina; Kristina Sidorova	3–6, 6–2, [6–10]
Win	4–5	Jun 2025	ITF Luzhou, China	W35	Hard	(Indonesia) Priska Madelyn Nugroho	(Japan) Saki Imamura (Japan) Ikumi Yamazaki	6–4, 6–3
Win	5–5	Jun 2025	ITF Taizhou, China	W50	Hard	(Indonesia) Priska Madelyn Nugroho	(China) Huang Yujia (China) Zheng Wushuang	6–3, 6–4
Win	6–5	Jun 2025	ITF Taipei, Taiwan	W35	Hard	(South Korea) Park So-hyun	(Chinese Taipei) Li Yu-yun (Japan) Eri Shimizu	6–1, 7–5

== ITF Junior Circuit finals ==
=== Singles: 12 (9 titles, 3 runner-ups) ===
Legend Category G3 (2–0) Category G4 (4–1) Category G5 (3–2)	Finals by surface Hard (8–3) Clay (1–0)

Result	W-L	Date	Tournament	Tier	Surface	Opponent	Score
Win	1–0	Jul 2017	ITF Jakarta, Indonesia	G4	Hard	(Hong Kong) Justine Leong	6–2, 6–4
Win	2–0	Jul 2017	ITF Jakarta, Indonesia	G4	Hard	(Indonesia) Samantha Nanere	6–4, 6–4
Loss	2–1	Aug 2017	ITF Hong Kong, China SAR	G5	Hard	(Thailand) Supapitch Kuearum	1–6, 0–6
Win	3–1	Oct 2017	ITF Jakarta, Indonesia	G5	Hard	(China) Dong Na	6–4, 6–3
Win	4–1	Oct 2018	ITF Sarawak, Malaysia	G3	Hard	(Indonesia) Priska Madelyn Nugroho	6–4, 6–3
Loss	4–2	Oct 2018	ITF Jakarta, Indonesia	G5	Hard	(Indonesia) Fitriani Sabatini	3–6, 2–6
Win	5–2	Nov 2018	ITF Manila, Philippines	G4	Clay	(Philippines) Alexandra Eala	6–3, 2–6, 7–5
Win	6–2	Jun 2019	ITF Jakarta, Indonesia	G4	Hard	(India) Vineetha Mummadi	7–5, 6–4
Loss	6–3	Jul 2019	ITF Jakarta, Indonesia	G4	Hard	(Indonesia) Fitriani Sabatini	4–6, 3–6
Win	7–3	Sep 2019	ITF Adelaide, Australia	G5	Hard	(Australia) Taylah Preston	6–4, 2–6, 6–3
Win	8–3	Sep 2019	ITF Jakarta, Indonesia	G3	Hard	(Chinese Taipei) Madeleine Jessup	6–3, 3–6, 6–1
Win	9–3	Oct 2019	ITF Surabaya, Indonesia	G5	Hard	(Indonesia) Felicia Halim	6–2, 6–2

=== Doubles: 17 (10 titles, 7 runner-ups) ===
Legend Category G3 (2–2) Category G4 (6–2) Category G5 (2–3)	Finals by surface Hard (8–7) Clay (2–0)

Result	W–L	Date	Tournament	Tier	Surface	Partner	Opponents	Score
Loss	0–1	Jun 2016	ITF Jakarta, Indonesia	G5	Hard	(Indonesia) Rifanty Kahfiani	(Indonesia) Shevita Aulana (Indonesia) Novela Rezha Millenia Putri	4–6, 1–6
Win	1–1	Jun 2016	ITF Nonthaburi, Thailand	G4	Hard	(Indonesia) Fitriana Sabrina	(Philippines) Maia Bernadette Balce (Japan) Nagomi Higashitani	7–6^{(1)}, 6–2
Loss	1–2	Mar 2017	ITF Kuala Lumpur, Malaysia	G5	Hard	(Singapore) Ashley Kei Yim	(Russia) Evelina Kontareva (Russia) Mariya Krasakova	2–6, 6–7^{(3)}
Loss	1–3	Jul 2017	ITF Jakarta, Indonesia	G4	Hard	(Chinese Taipei) Tsao Chia-yi	(Hong Kong) Justine Leong (Indonesia) Samantha Nanere	4–6, 6–0, [9–11]
Win	2–3	Jul 2017	ITF Nonthaburi, Thailand	G4	Hard	(Thailand) Mai Napatt Nirundorn	(China) Dong Na (China) Huang Yujia	7–6^{(5)}, 7–6^{(3)}
Loss	2–4	Oct 2017	ITF Sarawak, Malaysia	G3	Hard	(Indonesia) Priska Madelyn Nugroho	(South Korea) Park So-hyun (Thailand) Mananchaya Sawangkaew	4–6, 6–2, [5–10]
Win	3–4	Jun 2018	ITF Nonthaburi, Thailand	G4	Hard	(Thailand) Anchisa Chanta	(Chinese Taipei) Lee Kuan-yi (Chinese Taipei) Wang Chao-yi	5–7, 7–5, [10–8]
Loss	3–5	Oct 2018	ITF Sarawak, Malaysia	G3	Hard	(Hong Kong) Wing Ka Lin	(China) Li Xuanjin (China) Zhao Cong Ying	4–6, 6–4, [7–10]
Win	4–5	Nov 2018	ITF Makati City, Philippines	G4	Clay	(Chinese Taipei) Wang Chao-yi	(Japan) Kokomi Koyama (Japan) Erika Matsuda	6–0, 7–6^{(2)}
Win	5–5	Nov 2018	ITF Manila, Philippines	G4	Clay	(Chinese Taipei) Wang Chao-yi	(Japan) Kokomi Koyama (Japan) Erika Matsuda	6–4, 6–3
Win	6–5	Mar 2019	ITF Shenzhen, China	G3	Hard	(Chinese Taipei) Wang Chao-yi	(China) Dang Yiming (Hong Kong) Hoi Ki Jenny Wong	7–6^{(1)}, 7–5
Loss	6–6	Jun 2019	ITF Jakarta, Indonesia	G4	Hard	(Chinese Taipei) Wei Ning Fang	(Chinese Taipei) Hsuan Huang (Chinese Taipei) Ke Syuan Jhang	1–6, 6–7^{(4)}
Win	7–6	Jul 2019	ITF Jakarta, Indonesia	G4	Hard	(Chinese Taipei) Wei Ning Fang	(China) Wang Shuoran (China) Xue Xiaoyan	6–2, 6–3
Loss	7–7	Sep 2019	ITF Adelaide, Australia	G5	Hard	(Australia) Ella Simmons	(Australia) Jessie Culley (Australia) Taylah Preston	5–7, 4–6
Win	8–7	Sep 2019	ITF Sarawak, Malaysia	G3	Hard	(Chinese Taipei) Wang Chao-yi	(Hong Kong) Chui Kei Leung (Thailand) Pawinee Ruamrak	6–2, 3–6, [10–7]
Win	9–7	Oct 2019	ITF Surabaya, Indonesia	G5	Hard	(Australia) Ella Simmons	(Chinese Taipei) Cheng Yu-hua (Chinese Taipei) Hsu Ya-chi	1–6, 6–2, [10–5]
Win	10–7	Oct 2019	ITF Jakarta, Indonesia	G5	Hard	(Australia) Ella Simmons	(China) Li Mengke (China) Zhu Yiwendan	6–1, 7–5

== National representation ==
=== Multi-sport event (individual) ===
Tjen made her debut in multi-sport event at the 2019 ASEAN School Games in Semarang, Central Java, she won a gold medal in singles and silver medal in doubles.

==== Singles: 2 (1 gold medal, 1 bronze medal) ====
Result	Date	Tournament	Surface	Opponent	Score
Gold	Jul 2019	ASEAN School Games, Semarang	Hard	(Thailand) Lunda Kumhom	7–5, 6–4
Bronze	Dec 2025	SEA Games, Nonthaburi	Hard	(Thailand) Mananchaya Sawangkaew	4–6, ret.

==== Doubles: 3 (1 gold medal, 1 silver medal, 1 bronze medal) ====
Result	Date	Tournament	Surface	Partner	Opponents	Score
Silver	Jul 2019	ASEAN School Games, Semarang	Hard	(Indonesia) Nur Rosida Mega Hadiati	(Indonesia) Fitriani Sabatini (Indonesia) Fitriana Sabrina	2–6, 2–6
Bronze	Sep 2023	Asian Games, Hangzhou	Hard	(Indonesia) Aldila Sutjiadi	(Chinese Taipei) Chan Hao-ching (Chinese Taipei) Latisha Chan	2–6, 2–6
Gold	Dec 2025	SEA Games, Nonthaburi	Hard	(Indonesia) Aldila Sutjiadi	(Thailand) Mananchaya Sawangkaew (Thailand) Peangtarn Plipuech	6–2, 6–1

=== Billie Jean King Cup ===
Tjen made her Billie Jean King Cup debut at age 18 against China at the 2020-2021 Asia/Oceania Group I qualifying in Dubai, United Arab Emirates.

==== Singles (4–1) ====
Edition	Round	Date	Location	Against	Surface	Opponent	W/L	Score
2020–21	Z1 RR	Mar 2020	Dubai (UAE)	China	Hard	Zheng Saisai	L	1–6, 1–6
2026	Z1 RR	Apr 2026	New Delhi (India)	New Zealand	Hard	Monique Barry	W	6–3, 6–1
2026	Z1 RR	Apr 2026	New Delhi (India)	India	Hard	Sahaja Yamalapalli	W	6–2, 6–1
2026	Z1 RR	Apr 2026	New Delhi (India)	South Korea	Hard	Lee Eun-hye	W	6–2, 6–2
2026	Z1 RR	Apr 2026	New Delhi (India)	Thailand	Hard	Anchisa Chanta	W	6–2, 6–4

==== Doubles (4–1) ====
Edition	Stage	Date	Location	Against	Surface	Partner	Opponents	W/L	Score
2020–21	Z1 RR	Mar 2020	Dubai (UAE)	China	Hard	Priska Madelyn Nugroho	Xu Yifan; Zhang Shuai	L	1–6, 4–6
2020–21	Z1 RR	Mar 2020	Dubai (UAE)	Uzbekistan	Hard	Priska Madelyn Nugroho	Yasmina Karimjanova; Sitora Normuradova	W	6–1, 6–3
2020–21	Z1 RR	Mar 2020	Dubai (UAE)	South Korea	Hard	Aldila Sutjiadi	Choi Ji-hee; Kim Na-ri	W	6–2, 6–0
2026	Z1 RR	Apr 2026	New Delhi (India)	India	Hard	Aldila Sutjiadi	Rutuja Bhosale; Ankita Raina	W	6–3, 7–6^{(4)}
2026	Z1 RR	Apr 2026	New Delhi (India)	South Korea	Hard	Aldila Sutjiadi	Jeong Bo-young; Lee Eun-hye	W	6–4, 6–3

== Double bagel matches ==
=== Singles (4–0) ===
Result	Year	Tournament	Tier	Surface	Opponent	Rd	Ref
Win	2022	ITF Los Angeles, United States	W15	Hard	(United States) Natalia Mochernak	Q1	
Win	2024	ITF Monastir, Tunisia	W15	Hard	(Slovakia) Alica Rusová	Q2	
Win	2024	ITF Wellington, New Zealand	W15	Hard	(Australia) Sarah Rokusek	2R	
Win	2024	ITF Wellington, New Zealand	W15	Hard	(France) Maelys Bougrat	SF	

=== Doubles (1–0) ===
Result	Year	Tournament	Tier	Surface	Partner	Opponent	Rd	Ref
Win	2025	ITF Maanshan, China	W15	Hard	(Indonesia) Priska Madelyn Nugroho	(China) Wang Yuping (China) Xiao Zhenghua	SF	

== Honors and awards ==
Award	Year	Category	Result	Ref.
Intercollegiate Tennis Association Awards	2021	ITA Northwest Region Rookie of the Year	Won	
Intercollegiate Tennis Association Awards	2021	ITA All American (singles)	Honored	
Pac-12 Conference Awards	2021	Pac-12 Player of the Week (5 April)	Won	
Pac-12 Conference Awards	2021	All Pac-12 first team	Honored	
Pac-12 Conference Awards	2021	Pac-12 Freshman of the Year	Won	
West Coast Conference Awards	2022	West Coast Conference Doubles Team of the Week (15 March)	Won	
West Coast Conference Awards	2022	West Coast Conference Doubles Team of the Week (22 March)	Won	
West Coast Conference Awards	2022	West Coast Conference Singles Player of the Week (19 April)	Won	
West Coast Conference Awards	2022	All West Coast Conference Singles first team	Honored	
West Coast Conference Awards	2022	All West Coast Conference Doubles first team	Honored	
Intercollegiate Tennis Association Awards	2023	ITA All American (singles)	Honored	
Intercollegiate Tennis Association Awards	2023	ITA All American (doubles)	Honored	
West Coast Conference Awards	2023	West Coast Conference Doubles Team of the Week (17 January)	Won	
West Coast Conference Awards	2023	West Coast Conference Doubles Team of the Week (14 February)	Won	
West Coast Conference Awards	2023	West Coast Conference Singles Player of the Week (28 February)	Won	
West Coast Conference Awards	2023	West Coast Conference Doubles Team of the Week (7 March)	Won	
West Coast Conference Awards	2023	West Coast Conference Doubles Team of the Week (14 March)	Won	
West Coast Conference Awards	2023	West Coast Conference Doubles Team of the Week (28 March)	Won	
West Coast Conference Awards	2023	West Coast Conference Doubles Team of the Week (11 April)	Won	
West Coast Conference Awards	2023	All West Coast Conference Singles first team	Honored	
West Coast Conference Awards	2023	All West Coast Conference Doubles first team	Honored	
West Coast Conference Awards	2023	West Coast Conference Player of the Year	Won	
Intercollegiate Tennis Association Awards	2024	ITA All American (doubles)	Honored	
West Coast Conference Awards	2024	West Coast Conference Doubles Team of the Week (16 January)	Won	
West Coast Conference Awards	2024	West Coast Conference Doubles Team of the Week (13 February)	Won	
West Coast Conference Awards	2024	West Coast Conference Doubles Team of the Week (27 February)	Won	
West Coast Conference Awards	2024	West Coast Conference Doubles Team of the Week (5 March)	Won	
West Coast Conference Awards	2024	West Coast Conference Doubles Team of the Week (19 March)	Won	
West Coast Conference Awards	2024	West Coast Conference Doubles Team of the Week (26 March)	Won	
West Coast Conference Awards	2024	West Coast Conference Singles Player of the Week (2 April)	Won	
West Coast Conference Awards	2024	West Coast Conference Doubles Team of the Week (9 April)	Won	
West Coast Conference Awards	2024	West Coast Conference Singles Player of the Week (16 April)	Won	
West Coast Conference Awards	2024	All West Coast Conference Singles first team	Honored	
West Coast Conference Awards	2024	All West Coast Conference Doubles first team	Honored	
International Tennis Federation Awards	2025	ITF World Tennis Tour Player of the Month for May	Won	
International Tennis Federation Awards	2025	ITF World Tennis Tour Player of the Month for June	Won	
International Tennis Federation Awards	2025	ITF World Tennis Tour Class of 2025	Honored	
Santini JMTV Awards	2025	Favorite Female Athlete	Won	
SIWO PWI Award	2025	Best Female Athlete	Nominated	
SIWO PWI Award	2025	Inspirational Athlete	Won	
UTR Sports Year-End Awards	2025	Most Improved Player of the Year (WTA)	Honored	
WTA Awards	2025	Best Tournament Moment: WTA 250s	Nominated	
WTA year in review	2025	Most surprising WTA Player of 2025 / Biggest surprise	Won	
The Game Changer Award by Indonesian Olympic Committee	2026	Best Athlete Games Sports	Won	
Billie Jean King Cup Awards	2026	All-Star Team (Regionals)	Won	
Herworld Indonesia Awards	2026	Women of the Year	Won	
