= Aldila Sutjiadi =

Indonesian tennis player (born 1995)

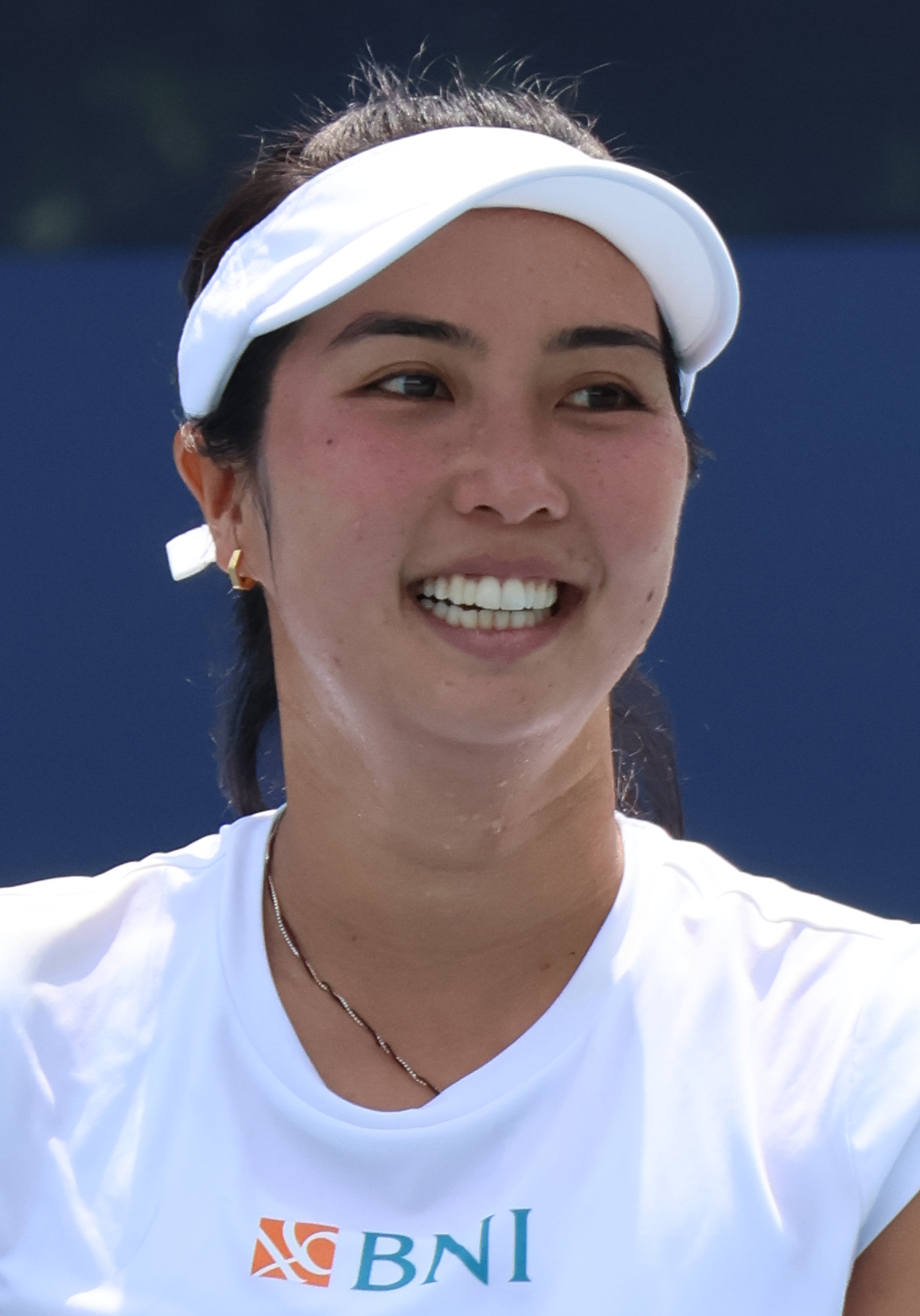
- Sutjiadi in 2024
- Country (sports): Indonesia
- Born: 2 May 1995 (age 31) Jakarta, Indonesia
- Height: 1.69 m (5 ft 7 in)
- Turned pro: 2010
- Plays: Right-handed (two-handed backhand)
- College: University of Kentucky (2013–2017)
- Coach: Christopher Rungkat
- Prize money: US$ 1,225,360

Singles
- Career record: 136–90
- Highest ranking: No. 344 (24 May 2021)

Doubles
- Career record: 279–170
- Career titles: 9
- Highest ranking: No. 16 (12 October 2026)
- Current ranking: No. 16 (12 October 2026)

Grand Slam doubles results
- Australian Open: 3R (2023)
- French Open: 3R (2023)
- Wimbledon: 3R (2023, 2024)
- US Open: QF (2026)

Grand Slam mixed doubles results
- Australian Open: 2R (2024)
- French Open: SF (2023)
- Wimbledon: SF (2023)
- US Open: SF (2024)

Team competitions
- BJK Cup: 24–15
Medal record
Women's tennis
Representing Indonesia
Asian Games
Gold medal – first place	2018 Jakarta–Palembang	Mixed doubles
Bronze medal – third place	2022 Hangzhou	Doubles
Asian Indoor and Martial Arts Games
Silver medal – second place	2017 Ashgabat	Singles
SEA Games
Gold medal – first place	2019 Philippines	Singles
Gold medal – first place	2019 Philippines	Mixed doubles
Gold medal – first place	2021 Vietnam	Mixed doubles
Gold medal – first place	2023 Cambodia	Mixed doubles
Gold medal – first place	2023 Cambodia	Team
Gold medal – first place	2025 Thailand	Doubles
Gold medal – first place	2025 Thailand	Team
Silver medal – second place	2023 Cambodia	Doubles
Bronze medal – third place	2015 Singapore	Doubles
Bronze medal – third place	2015 Singapore	Team
Bronze medal – third place	2021 Vietnam	Team
Bronze medal – third place	2025 Thailand	Mixed doubles
- Last updated on: 12 October 2026.

Aldila Sutjiadi (born 2 May 1995) is an Indonesian professional tennis player who specializes in doubles. She has been the highest-ranked active Indonesian woman in doubles since May 2021 and reached a career-high doubles ranking of world No. 16 on 12 October 2026.

Sutjiadi has won nine doubles titles on the WTA Tour and five at WTA 125 level, as well as one singles title and sixteen doubles titles on the ITF Circuit.

Her first WTA Tour title, at the 2022 Copa Colsanitas with Astra Sharma, made her the first Indonesian player to win a WTA title in either singles or doubles since Angelique Widjaja in 2003. In 2026, she won her first three WTA 500 titles of her career, at the Bad Homburg Open alongside Vera Zvonareva, and at the Washington DC Open and Singapore Tennis Open with Erin Routliffe. Together with Miyu Kato, she qualified for the limited six-team doubles competition at the year-end 2023 WTA Elite Trophy, where they finished as runners-up.

In mixed doubles, she reached the semifinals at three Grand Slam tournaments: the 2023 French Open and 2023 Wimbledon Championships with Matwé Middelkoop, and the 2024 US Open with Rohan Bopanna.

Representing Indonesia, Sutjiadi won the mixed doubles gold medal at the 2018 Asian Games with Christopher Rungkat, earning the country its first tennis medal at the Games in 16 years. She has also won SEA Games gold medals in women's singles, women's doubles and mixed doubles.

== Career ==
=== Juniors and collegiate tennis ===
==== 2008–2012 ====
Sutjiadi began competing on the ITF Junior Circuit in 2008. In 2010, she won both the singles and doubles titles at the Indonesia International Junior Championships. Her best junior Grand Slam result came at the 2012 Australian Open, where she reached the girls' doubles semifinals alongside Rutuja Bhosale.

Sutjiadi made her professional debut at an ITF Women's Circuit tournament in Jakarta in 2010, at the age of 15. Representing Jakarta at the 2012 Indonesian National Sports Week, she won gold medals in both women's singles and doubles.

==== Junior Grand Slam performance ====
Singles:

- Australian Open: 1R (2012, 2013)
- French Open: 1R (2012)
- Wimbledon: 2R (2012)
- US Open: –

Doubles:

- Australian Open: SF (2012)
- French Open: 2R (2012)
- Wimbledon: 1R (2012)
- US Open: –

==== 2013–2017: College career and early international representation ====
In 2013, Sutjiadi was selected for the Indonesia Fed Cup team. She also began attending the University of Kentucky, where she played four seasons of collegiate tennis for the Kentucky Wildcats. At the 2015 SEA Games in Singapore, she won bronze medals in women's doubles with Jessy Rompies and in the women's team event alongside Rompies, Lavinia Tananta, and Ayu Fani Damayanti.

Partnering Mami Adachi, Sutjiadi earned ITA All-America honors in doubles in 2016 and 2017. The pair won the 2016 Oracle/ITA National Indoor Intercollegiate Championships, earning the Kentucky women's tennis program its first national championship. Sutjiadi graduated in May 2017 with a degree in mathematical economics and was nominated for the NCAA Woman of the Year Award. Later that year, she won the women's singles silver medal at the Asian Indoor and Martial Arts Games, losing to compatriot Beatrice Gumulya in the final.

=== Professional ===
==== 2018–2022: Asian Games gold, WTA Tour title and top 100 ====
In June 2018, Sutjiadi won her first professional singles title at an ITF Women's Circuit tournament in Surakarta, defeating Du Zhima in the final. At the 2018 Asian Games later that year, she partnered Christopher Rungkat in the mixed doubles event. They defeated the Thai pair of Luksika Kumkhum and Sonchat Ratiwatana in the final, earning Indonesia its first Asian Games tennis medal in 16 years.

At the 2019 SEA Games, Sutjiadi won the women's singles gold medal by defeating Savanna Ly-Nguyen in the final. She also won mixed doubles gold alongside Rungkat, defeating Sanchai Ratiwatana and Tamarine Tanasugarn of Thailand.

In May 2021, Sutjiadi won her first W100 doubles title at the FineMark Women's Pro Tennis Championship alongside Erin Routliffe. Later that year, she reached her first two WTA 125 finals, finishing as runner-up at the LTP Women's Open with Routliffe and at the Dow Tennis Classic alongside Peangtarn Plipuech.

In January 2022, Sutjiadi made her major main-draw debut at the Australian Open, partnering Plipuech after the pair received the Asia-Pacific women's doubles wildcard. They lost in the first round.In April, she and Astra Sharma won the Copa Colsanitas, defeating Emina Bektas and Tara Moore in the final. It was Sutjiadi's first WTA Tour title and made her the first Indonesian player to win a WTA title in either singles or doubles since Angelique Widjaja won the doubles title at the 2003 Wismilak International alongside María Vento-Kabchi. Following the tournament, she entered the doubles top 100 for the first time at world No. 86.

At the postponed 2021 SEA Games, held in May 2022, Sutjiadi and Rungkat successfully defended their mixed doubles title, while she also won bronze in the women's team event with Beatrice Gumulya, Jessy Rompies, Novela Rezha and Fitriani Sabatini.

At the French Open, Sutjiadi partnered Miyu Kato for the first time. Sutjiadi later recalled that they immediately "clicked", beginning what became a long-running partnership. They won their opening match, giving Sutjiadi her first Grand Slam match victory, before losing in the second round. The pair subsequently reached the final of the Hamburg European Open. She ended the season by winning her first two WTA 125 titles, at the Abierto Tampico with Tereza Mihalíková and the Copa LP Chile alongside Yana Sizikova.

==== 2023: Three WTA Tour titles, top 30 and Elite Trophy final ====
Sutjiadi and Kato began the 2023 season by winning the Auckland Open, their first title together, after defeating Leylah Fernandez and Bethanie Mattek-Sands. In March, Sutjiadi won the inaugural ATX Open alongside Routliffe, earning her third WTA Tour title. Reuniting with Kato at the Indian Wells Open, she reached her first WTA 1000 semifinal. They upset second seeds Coco Gauff and Jessica Pegula, who had defeated them in the third round of the Australian Open two months earlier, and then defeated Gabriela Dabrowski and Luisa Stefani, before losing to Beatriz Haddad Maia and Laura Siegemund.

Representing Indonesia at the 2023 SEA Games, Sutjiadi won gold medals in mixed doubles with Rungkat—their third consecutive title in the event—and in the women's team competition with Rompies, Gumulya, and Priska Madelyn Nugroho. She also won the women's doubles silver medal alongside Rompies.

In women's doubles, Sutjiadi and Kato reached the third round at all four Grand Slam tournaments. At the French Open, they were disqualified from their third-round match against Marie Bouzková and Sara Sorribes Tormo after a ball struck by Kato between points accidentally hit a ball girl. The chair umpire initially issued a warning, but Bouzková and Sorribes Tormo protested and the pair were disqualified after a tournament supervisor was called. The ruling and the opponents' role in its escalation drew significant criticism from other players, while the Professional Tennis Players Association described the punishment as disproportionate and unfair.

At the same tournament, Sutjiadi made her major mixed doubles debut alongside Matwé Middelkoop. They reached the semifinals, where they lost to Kato and Tim Pütz, the eventual champions. At the Wimbledon Championships, Sutjiadi and Middelkoop reached a second consecutive major mixed doubles semifinal, losing to Joran Vliegen and Xu Yifan. The two runs represented Indonesia's best results in senior events at the respective tournaments, with Sutjiadi becoming the first Indonesian player to reach a semifinal at either. Her French Open run also made her the second Indonesian player to reach a senior major semifinal, after Yayuk Basuki reached the women's doubles semifinals at the 1993 US Open with Nana Miyagi.

In August, Sutjiadi and Kato won the Cleveland title, giving Sutjiadi her third WTA Tour title of the season. The following month, she and Janice Tjen won the women's doubles bronze medal at the postponed Asian Games in Hangzhou. Sutjiadi reached her career-high doubles ranking of world No. 26 on 23 October.

Sutjiadi and Kato qualified for the six-team doubles competition at the season-ending WTA Elite Trophy, held in Zhuhai, China. Seeded second, they won both of their round-robin matches to advance to the final, where they finished as runners-up to top seeds Haddad Maia and Veronika Kudermetova.

==== 2024: Fifth career title and third mixed doubles semifinal ====
In February, Sutjiadi and Kato won the Thailand Open, defeating second seeds Guo Hanyu and Jiang Xinyu in the final. It was their third title together and Sutjiadi's fifth on the WTA Tour.

During the European clay-court season, Sutjiadi began partnering Asia Muhammad. In May, they won the WTA 125 Trophée Clarins in Paris, defeating Monica Niculescu and Zhu Lin in the final. The following week, they reached the final of the WTA 500 Internationaux de Strasbourg, where they lost to Cristina Bucșa and Niculescu. It was Sutjiadi's first final at that level.

At the US Open, Sutjiadi partnered Rohan Bopanna in mixed doubles. The eighth-seeded pair reached the semifinals, where they lost to Taylor Townsend and Donald Young. The run was Sutjiadi's third major mixed doubles semifinal, following the French Open and Wimbledon in 2023, and made her the first Indonesian player to reach the semifinals at three different senior Grand Slam tournaments.

Later that month, representing East Java at the 2024 edition of Indonesia's National Sports Week, Sutjiadi swept all three events she entered, winning gold medals in the women's team event, women's doubles with Tjen, and mixed doubles with Rungkat. The victories brought her career total to 12 PON gold medals across four editions of the Games.

On her Wuhan Open debut in October, Sutjiadi reached her second WTA 1000 semifinal alongside Fernandez. They defeated fifth seeds Elise Mertens and Zhang Shuai, followed by second seeds Nicole Melichar-Martinez and Ellen Perez, before losing to Muhammad and Pegula.

==== 2025: Sixth WTA Tour title and SEA Games golds ====
In January, Sutjiadi withdrew from the Australian Open while recovering from sudden hearing loss experienced the previous month. She made her first WTA Tour appearance of the season at the Indian Wells Open in March. In May, she won the WTA 125 Catalonia Open alongside Bianca Andreescu, defeating Fernandez and Lulu Sun in the final.

In September, Sutjiadi reached her second WTA 500 final at the Guadalajara Open with Giuliana Olmos. Seeded second, they finished as runners-up to top seeds Irina Khromacheva and Melichar-Martinez.

The following month, Sutjiadi partnered Tjen at the Suzhou WTA 125. They won the title without dropping a set, defeating Katarzyna Kawa and Makoto Ninomiya in the final. The victory marked the first WTA-sanctioned title won by an all-Indonesian pair in three decades. Four weeks later, Sutjiadi and Tjen won the WTA 250 Chennai Open, upsetting top seeds Storm Hunter and Niculescu in the final. It was Sutjiadi's sixth WTA Tour title.

At the 2025 SEA Games in Thailand, Sutjiadi helped Indonesia retain the women's team title. Partnering Tjen in the decisive doubles rubber, she defeated Mananchaya Sawangkaew and Plipuech as Indonesia won the final against the hosts 2–1. Sutjiadi and Tjen subsequently won the women's doubles gold medal, defeating the same Thai pair in the final. She also won bronze in mixed doubles alongside Rungkat.

==== 2026: WTA 500 titles and top 20 debut ====
At the beginning of the season, Sutjiadi began working with her longtime mixed doubles partner Rungkat as her coach. Their coaching partnership began at the Hobart International, with Sutjiadi citing their established chemistry and Rungkat's familiarity with her game.

In April, Sutjiadi competed in both singles and doubles for Indonesia in the Asia/Oceania Group I competition of the 2026 Billie Jean King Cup held in New Delhi, India. She helped Indonesia finish runner-up and advance to the play-offs. Later that month, Sutjiadi continued her partnership with Tjen on the WTA Tour. They reached the quarterfinals of the Madrid Open and the semifinals of the Nottingham Open in June.

Sutjiadi began partnering Vera Zvonareva during the clay-court season. They reached the doubles final at the Morocco Open in May, losing to Eudice Chong and Magali Kempen. The following month, after finishing runner-up in her first two WTA 500 finals, at Strasbourg in 2024 and Guadalajara in 2025, Sutjiadi won the first 500 title of her career at the Bad Homburg Open alongside Zvonareva, defeating third seeds Ellen Perez and Demi Schuurs in the final.

At Wimbledon, Sutjiadi partnered Guido Andreozzi in mixed doubles and reached the quarterfinals. In August and September, she won her second and third WTA 500 titles at the Washington DC Open and Singapore Tennis Open, respectively, alongside Erin Routliffe. Following the Singapore title, Sutjiadi reached a new career-high doubles ranking of world No. 19 on 28 September, entering the top 20 for the first time.

== Honors and awards ==
Award	Year	Category	Result	Ref.
National Collegiate Athletic Association Award	2015	Elite 89 Award	Won	
National Collegiate Athletic Association Award	2016	Elite 89 Award	Won	
SEC Scholar–Athlete of the Year Award	2017	Tri Scholar–Athlete of the Year	Won	
National Collegiate Athletic Association Award	2017	NCAA Woman of the Year Award	Nominated	
Arthur Ashe Jr. Sports Scholar of the Year	2017	Sports Scholar of the Year	Placed	
Indonesian Sport Awards	2018	Favorite Mixed Doubles Athlete with Christopher Rungkat	Nominated	
Santini JebreeetMedia Awards	2023	Favorite Athlete	Nominated	
Santini JMTV Awards	2025	Favorite Female Athlete	Nominated	

== Grand Slam performance timelines ==
Key
W	F	SF	QF	#R	RR	Q#	P#	DNQ	A	Z#	PO	G	S	B	NMS	NTI	P	NH

(W) winner; (F) finalist; (SF) semifinalist; (QF) quarterfinalist; (#R) rounds 4, 3, 2, 1; (RR) round-robin stage; (Q#) qualification round; (P#) preliminary round; (DNQ) did not qualify; (A) absent; (Z#) Davis/Fed Cup Zonal Group (with number indication) or (PO) play-off; (G) gold, (S) silver or (B) bronze Olympic/Paralympic medal; (NMS) not a Masters tournament; (NTI) not a Tier I tournament; (P) postponed; (NH) not held; (SR) strike rate (events won / competed); (W–L) win–loss record.
To avoid confusion and double counting, these charts are updated at the conclusion of a tournament or when the player's participation has ended.

=== Doubles ===
Tournament	2022	2023	2024	2025	2026	SR	W–L	Win%
Australian Open	1R	3R	1R	A	2R	0 / 4	3–4	43%
French Open	2R	3R	2R	1R	1R	0 / 5	4–5	44%
Wimbledon	1R	3R	3R	2R	2R	0 / 5	6–5	55%
US Open	2R	3R	2R	1R	QF	0 / 5	7–5	58%
Win–loss	2–4	8–4	4–4	1–3	5–4	0 / 19	20–19	51%

=== Mixed doubles ===
Tournament	2022	2023	2024	2025	2026	SR	W–L	Win%
Australian Open	A	A	2R	A	A	0 / 1	1–1	50%
French Open	A	SF	1R	A	A	0 / 2	3–2	60%
Wimbledon	A	SF	2R	2R	QF	0 / 4	7–4	64%
US Open	A	2R	SF	A	A	0 / 2	4–2	67%
Win–loss	0–0	7–3	5–4	1–1	2–1	0 / 9	15–9	63%

== Significant finals ==
=== WTA Elite Trophy ===
==== Doubles: 1 (runner-up) ====
Result	Year	Tournament	Surface	Partner	Opponents	Score
Loss	2023	Elite Trophy, Zhuhai	Hard	(Japan) Miyu Kato	(Brazil) Beatriz Haddad Maia; Veronika Kudermetova	3–6, 3–6

== WTA Tour finals ==
=== Doubles: 14 (9 titles, 5 runner-ups) ===
Legend WTA Elite Trophy (0–1) WTA 500 (3–2) WTA 250 (6–2)	Finals by surface Hard (7–2) Clay (1–3) Grass (1–0)

Result	W–L	Date	Tournament	Tier	Surface	Partner	Opponents	Score
Win	1–0	Apr 2022	Copa Colsanitas, Colombia	WTA 250	Clay	(Australia) Astra Sharma	(United States) Emina Bektas (United Kingdom) Tara Moore	4–6, 6–4, [11–9]
Loss	1–1	Jul 2022	Hamburg European Open, Germany	WTA 250	Clay	(Japan) Miyu Kato	(United States) Sophie Chang (United States) Angela Kulikov	3–6, 6–4, [6–10]
Win	2–1	Jan 2023	Auckland Open, New Zealand	WTA 250	Hard	(Japan) Miyu Kato	(Canada) Leylah Fernandez (United States) Bethanie Mattek-Sands	1–6, 7–5, [10–4]
Win	3–1	Mar 2023	ATX Open, United States	WTA 250	Hard	(New Zealand) Erin Routliffe	(United States) Nicole Melichar-Martinez (Australia) Ellen Perez	6–4, 3–6, [10–8]
Win	4–1	Aug 2023	Tennis in Cleveland, United States	WTA 250	Hard	(Japan) Miyu Kato	(United States) Nicole Melichar-Martinez (Australia) Ellen Perez	6–4, 6–7^{(4)}, [10–8]
Loss	4–2	Oct 2023	WTA Elite Trophy, China	Elite	Hard	(Japan) Miyu Kato	(Brazil) Beatriz Haddad Maia; Veronika Kudermetova	3–6, 3–6
Win	5–2	Feb 2024	Hua Hin Championships, Thailand	WTA 250	Hard	(Japan) Miyu Kato	(China) Guo Hanyu (China) Jiang Xinyu	6–4, 1–6, [10–7]
Loss	5–3	May 2024	Internationaux de Strasbourg, France	WTA 500	Clay	(United States) Asia Muhammad	(Spain) Cristina Bucșa (Romania) Monica Niculescu	6–3, 4–6, [6–10]
Loss	5–4	Sep 2025	Guadalajara Open, Mexico	WTA 500	Hard	(Mexico) Giuliana Olmos	(United States) Nicole Melichar-Martinez; Irina Khromacheva	3–6, 4–6
Win	6–4	Oct 2025	Chennai Open, India	WTA 250	Hard	(Indonesia) Janice Tjen	(Australia) Storm Hunter (Romania) Monica Niculescu	7–5, 6–4
Loss	6–5	May 2026	Rabat Grand Prix, Morocco	WTA 250	Clay	Vera Zvonareva	(Hong Kong) Eudice Chong (Belgium) Magali Kempen	3–6, 6–2, [6–10]
Win	7–5	Jun 2026	Bad Homburg Open, Germany	WTA 500	Grass	Vera Zvonareva	(Australia) Ellen Perez (Netherlands) Demi Schuurs	6–1, 4–6, [10–5]
Win	8–5	Jul 2026	Washington DC Open, United States	WTA 500	Hard	(New Zealand) Erin Routliffe	(Slovenia) Andreja Klepač (Japan) Makoto Ninomiya	6–4, 6–1
Win	9–5	Sep 2026	Singapore Open, Singapore	WTA 500	Hard	(New Zealand) Erin Routliffe	(China) Tang Qianhui (China) Xu Yifan	6–3, 6–2

== WTA 125 finals ==
=== Doubles: 7 (5 titles, 2 runner-ups) ===
Result	W–L	Date	Tournament	Surface	Partner	Opponents	Score
Loss	0–1	Jul 2021	Charleston Pro, United States	Clay	(New Zealand) Erin Routliffe	(Chinese Taipei) Liang En-shuo (Canada) Rebecca Marino	7–5, 5–7, [7–10]
Loss	0–2	Nov 2021	Midland Tennis Classic, United States	Hard (i)	(Thailand) Peangtarn Plipuech	(United Kingdom) Harriet Dart (United States) Asia Muhammad	3–6, 6–2, [7–10]
Win	1–2	Oct 2022	Abierto Tampico, Mexico	Hard	(Slovakia) Tereza Mihalíková	(United States) Ashlyn Krueger (United States) Elizabeth Mandlik	7–5, 6–2
Win	2–2	Nov 2022	Copa Colina, Chile	Clay	(Russia) Yana Sizikova	(Egypt) Mayar Sherif (Slovenia) Tamara Zidanšek	6–1, 3–6, [10–7]
Win	3–2	May 2024	Trophée Clarins Paris, France	Clay	(United States) Asia Muhammad	(Romania) Monica Niculescu (China) Zhu Lin	7–6^{(3)}, 4–6, [11–9]
Win	4–2	Apr 2025	Catalonia Open, Spain	Clay	(Canada) Bianca Andreescu	(Canada) Leylah Fernandez (New Zealand) Lulu Sun	6–2, 6–4
Win	5–2	Oct 2025	Suzhou Ladies Open, China	Hard	(Indonesia) Janice Tjen	(Poland) Katarzyna Kawa (Japan) Makoto Ninomiya	6–4, 6–3

== ITF Circuit finals ==
=== Singles: 4 (1 title, 3 runner-ups) ===
Legend $25,000 tournaments (0–1) $15,000 tournaments (1–2)	Finals by surface Hard (1–3) Clay (0–0)

Result	W-L	Date	Tournament	Tier	Surface	Opponent	Score
Win	1–0	Jun 2018	ITF Solo, Indonesia	15,000	Hard	(China) Du Zhima	6–2, 6–0
Loss	1–1	Dec 2018	ITF Hua Hin, Thailand	15,000	Hard	(Thailand) Nudnida Luangnam	1–6, 6–3, 3–6
Loss	1–2	Dec 2018	ITF Hua Hin, Thailand	15,000	Hard	(Thailand) Nudnida Luangnam	3–6, 6–1, 1–6
Loss	1–3	May 2019	ITF Singapore, Singapore	25,000	Hard	(Thailand) Nudnida Luangnam	3–6, 2–6

=== Doubles: 26 (16 titles, 10 runner-ups) ===
Legend $100,000 tournaments (3–0) $60,000 tournaments (2–2) $25,000 tournaments (8–4) $10/15,000 tournaments (3–4)	Finals by surface Hard (9–9) Clay (4–1) Grass (1–0) Carpet (2–0)

Result	W–L	Date	Tournament	Tier	Surface	Partner	Opponents	Score
Loss	0–1	Jul 2013	ITF Solo, Indonesia	10,000	Hard	(China) Zhu Aiwen	(Indonesia) Beatrice Gumulya (Indonesia) Jessy Rompies	2–6, 4–6
Win	1–1	Jun 2014	ITF Solo, Indonesia	10,000	Hard	(Indonesia) Nadia Ravita	(Indonesia) Beatrice Gumulya (Indonesia) Jessy Rompies	6–2, 7–6^{(3)}
Loss	1–2	May 2018	ITF Hua Hin, Thailand	15,000	Hard	(China) Sheng Yuqi	(India) Zeel Desai (Thailand) Bunyawi Thamchaiwat	5–7, 1–6
Loss	1–3	May 2018	ITF Hua Hin, Thailand	15,000	Hard	(China) Sheng Yuqi	(China) Wang Danni (United States) Amy Zhu	6–1, 4–6, [7–10]
Win	2–3	Jul 2018	ITF Jakarta, Indonesia	15,000	Hard	(Netherlands) Arianne Hartono	(Japan) Mana Ayukawa (India) Zeel Desai	6–1, 6–2
Win	3–3	Nov 2018	ITF Muzaffarnagar, India	25,000	Grass	(China) Wang Danni	(Japan) Kyoka Okamura (Japan) Michika Ozeki	7–6^{(6)}, 7–5
Loss	3–4	Nov 2018	ITF Hua Hin, Thailand	15,000	Hard	(Japan) Ayaka Okuno	(Thailand) Bunyawi Thamchaiwat (Thailand) Nudnida Luangnam	4–6, 2–6
Win	4–4	Dec 2018	ITF Hua Hin, Thailand	15,000	Hard	(Indonesia) Nadia Ravita	(Chinese Taipei) Joanna Garland (Thailand) Mananchaya Sawangkaew	6–2, 6–4
Win	5–4	Jan 2019	ITF Singapore, Singapore	25,000	Hard	(New Zealand) Paige Hourigan	(Hong Kong) Eudice Chong (Hong Kong) Zhang Ling	6–2, 6–3
Win	6–4	Apr 2019	ITF Hong Kong, China SAR	25,000	Hard (i) (Note: This tournament is an outdoor event, but rain caused the doubles final to be postponed from 13 April and then transferred to an indoor court.)	(New Zealand) Paige Hourigan	(Australia) Maddison Inglis (Australia) Kaylah McPhee	6–3, 6–1
Win	7–4	May 2019	ITF Singapore, Singapore	25,000	Hard	(New Zealand) Paige Hourigan	(United Kingdom) Emily Appleton (United States) Catherine Harrison	6–1, 7–6^{(5)}
Win	8–4	Jul 2019	ITF Nonthaburi, Thailand	25,000	Hard	(Hong Kong) Eudice Chong	(Thailand) Peangtarn Plipuech (Japan) Akiko Omae	7–6^{(2)}, 6–4
Win	9–4	Aug 2019	ITF Nonthaburi, Thailand	25,000	Hard	(Hong Kong) Eudice Chong	(China) Wu Meixu (Japan) Erika Sema	6–2, 6–1
Loss	9–5	Aug 2019	ITF Guiyang, China	25,000	Hard	(Hong Kong) Eudice Chong	(China) Tang Qianhui (China) Jiang Xinyu	5–7, 5–7
Win	10–5	Oct 2019	ITF Makinohara, Japan	25,000	Carpet	(Hong Kong) Eudice Chong	(Japan) Erina Hayashi (Japan) Momoko Kobori	6–7^{(5)}, 7–6^{(5)}, [10–4]
Win	11–5	Oct 2019	ITF Hamamatsu, Japan	25,000	Carpet	(Hong Kong) Eudice Chong	(Japan) Sakura Hondo (Japan) Ramu Ueda	6–3, 6–4
Loss	11–6	May 2021	Charlottesville Open, United States	W60	Clay	(New Zealand) Erin Routliffe	(Kazakhstan) Anna Danilina (Australia) Arina Rodionova	1–6, 3–6
Win	12–6	May 2021	Bonita Springs Championship, US	W100	Clay	(New Zealand) Erin Routliffe	(Japan) Eri Hozumi (Japan) Miyu Kato	6–3, 4–6, [10–6]
Loss	12–7	Jun 2021	ITF Sumter, United States	W25	Hard	(New Zealand) Paige Hourigan	(United States) Emina Bektas (United States) Catherine Harrison	5–7, 4–6
Win	13–7	Jun 2021	Charleston Pro, US	W60	Clay	(Hungary) Fanny Stollár	(United States) Rasheeda McAdoo (United States) Peyton Stearns	6–0, 6–4
Loss	13–8	Jan 2022	Traralgon International, Australia	W60	Hard	(United States) Catherine Harrison	(United States) Emina Bektas (United Kingdom) Tara Moore	6–0, 6–7^{(1)}, [8–10]
Win	14–8	Apr 2022	Charleston Pro, US (2)	W100	Clay	(Poland) Katarzyna Kawa	(United States) Sophie Chang (United States) Angela Kulikov	6–1, 6–4
Win	15–8	Aug 2022	Lexington Challenger, US	W60	Hard	(Ukraine) Kateryna Volodko	(United States) Jada Hart (United States) Dalayna Hewitt	7–5, 6–3
Loss	15–9	Oct 2022	ITF Redding, US	W25	Hard	(United States) Alexa Glatch	(United States) Rasheeda McAdoo (Ukraine) Hanna Poznikhirenko	6–7^{(3)}, 5–7
Loss	15–10	Feb 2025	Arcadia Pro Open, US	W35	Hard	(Indonesia) Janice Tjen	(United States) Victoria Osuigwe (United States) Alana Smith	3–6, 4–6
Win	16–10	Apr 2025	Zaragoza Open, Spain	W100	Clay	(Australia) Olivia Gadecki	(Spain) Aliona Bolsova (Spain) Ángela Fita Boluda	6–4, 6–3

== ITF Junior Circuit finals ==
=== Singles: 4 (3 titles, 1 runner-up) ===
Legend Category G1 / B1 Category G2 (1–0) Category G3 Category G4 (2–1)	Finals by surface Hard (2–1) Clay (1–0)

Result	W–L	Date	Tournament	Tier	Surface	Opponent	Score
Win	1–0	Oct 2010	ITF Perak, Malaysia	G4	Hard	(Liechtenstein) Kathinka von Deichmann	6–4, 5–7, 6–4
Win	2–0	Nov 2010	ITF Jakarta, Indonesia	G4	Clay	(Indonesia) Nadya Syarifah	6–1, 7–6^{(5)}
Loss	2–1	Nov 2010	ITF Manila, Philippines	G4	Hard	(Liechtenstein) Kathinka von Deichmann	2–6, 3–6
Win	3–1	Oct 2011	ITF Nonthaburi, Thailand	G2	Hard	(Indonesia) Tami Grende	6–0, 6–2

=== Doubles: 12 (5 titles, 7 runner-ups) ===
Legend Category G1 / B1 (1–1) Category G2 (1–1) Category G3 (1–2) Category G4 (2–3)	Finals by surface Hard (4–6) Clay (1–1)

Result	W–L	Date	Tournament	Tier	Surface	Partner	Opponents	Score
Loss	0–1	Mar 2009	ITF Malacca, Malaysia	G4	Hard	(Indonesia) Nadya Syarifah	(Indonesia) Bella Destriana (China) Zheng Saisai	2–6, 3–6
Win	1–1	Oct 2009	ITF Perak, Malaysia	G4	Hard	(Indonesia) Nadya Syarifah	(Indonesia) Bella Destriana (Thailand) Nattawadee Kotcha	6–1, 4–6, [10–8]
Loss	1–2	Oct 2009	ITF Sarawak, Malaysia	G3	Hard	(Indonesia) Nadya Syarifah	(China) Tang Haochen (China) Yang Zhaoxuan	1–6, 2–6
Loss	1–3	Oct 2009	ITF Surabaya, Indonesia	G4	Hard	(Indonesia) Nadya Syarifah	(Indonesia) Bella Destriana (Indonesia) Cynthia Melita	3–6, 0–6
Loss	1–4	Nov 2010	ITF Surabaya, Indonesia	G4	Hard	(Indonesia) Nadya Syarifah	(Switzerland) Seraina Jaeger (Switzerland) Corina Jaeger	3–6, 6–4, [8–10]
Win	2–4	Nov 2010	ITF Jakarta, Indonesia	G4	Clay	(Indonesia) Nadya Syarifah	(Indonesia) Tria Rizki Amalia (Indonesia) Efriliya Herlina	7–6^{(4)}, 3–6, [10–7]
Loss	2–5	Jan 2011	ITF Kolkata, India	G3	Clay	(Thailand) Napatsakorn Sankaew	(Russia) Elizaveta Kulichkova (Croatia) Donna Vekić	6–3, 3–6, [5–10]
Win	3–5	May 2011	Asian Closed Junior, Chennai, India	B1	Hard	(Japan) Ayaka Okuno	(India) Aishwarya Agrawal (India) Rutuja Bhosale	6–2, 6–3
Loss	3–6	Oct 2011	ITF Beijing, China	G2	Hard	(China) Zhu Aiwen	(Uzbekistan) Sabina Sharipova (Russia) Anna Tyulpa	2–6, 6–3, [3–10]
Win	4–6	Oct 2011	ITF Sarawak, Malaysia	G3	Hard	(Thailand) Kamonwan Buayam	(United Kingdom) Katie Boulter (Switzerland) Karin Kennel	6–3, 6–2
Win	5–6	Oct 2011	ITF Nonthaburi, Thailand	G2	Hard	(Thailand) Kamonwan Buayam	(United Kingdom) Katie Boulter (United Kingdom) Katy Dunne	w/o
Loss	5–7	Apr 2012	Asian Closed Junior, New Delhi, India	B1	Hard	(Thailand) Kamonwan Buayam	(Japan) Mami Adachi (Japan) Hikari Yamamoto	2–6, 0–6

== National representation ==
=== Multi-sport event (individual) ===
Sutjiadi made her debut in multi-sport event at the 2015 SEA Games, she won a bronze medal in women's doubles.

==== Singles: 2 (1 gold & 1 silver medal) ====
Result	Date	Tournament	Surface	Opponent	Score
Silver	Sep 2017	Asian Indoor and Martial Arts Games, Ashgabat	Hard	(Indonesia) Beatrice Gumulya	3–6, 6–3, 3–6
Gold	Dec 2019	SEA Games, Manila	Hard	(Vietnam) Savanna Lý Nguyễn	6–0, 7–5

==== Doubles: 4 (1 gold, 1 silver, 2 bronze medals) ====
Result	Date	Tournament	Surface	Partner	Opponents	Score
Bronze	Jun 2015	SEA Games, Singapore	Hard	(Indonesia) Jessy Rompies	(Thailand) Noppawan Lertcheewakarn (Thailand) Varatchaya Wongteanchai	2–6, 3–6
Silver	May 2023	SEA Games, Phnom Penh	Hard	(Indonesia) Jessy Rompies	(Thailand) Luksika Kumkhum (Thailand) Peangtarn Plipuech	4–6, 6–7^{(2)}
Bronze	Sep 2023	Asian Games, Hangzhou	Hard	(Indonesia) Janice Tjen	(Chinese Taipei) Chan Hao-ching (Chinese Taipei) Latisha Chan	2–6, 2–6
Gold	Dec 2025	SEA Games, Nonthaburi	Hard	(Indonesia) Janice Tjen	(Thailand) Mananchaya Sawangkaew (Thailand) Peangtarn Plipuech	6–2, 6–1

==== Mixed doubles: 5 (4 gold medals, 1 bronze medal) ====
Result	Date	Tournament	Surface	Partner	Opponents	Score
Gold	Aug 2018	Asian Games, Palembang	Hard	(Indonesia) Christopher Rungkat	(Thailand) Sonchat Ratiwatana (Thailand) Luksika Kumkhum	4–6, 7–5, [10–7]
Gold	Dec 2019	SEA Games, Manila	Hard	(Indonesia) Christopher Rungkat	(Thailand) Sanchai Ratiwatana (Thailand) Tamarine Tanasugarn	4–6, 6–4, [10–8]
Gold	May 2022	SEA Games, Bắc Ninh	Hard	(Indonesia) Christopher Rungkat	(Thailand) Pruchya Isaro (Thailand) Patcharin Cheapchandej	6–7^{(7)}, 6–2, [10–5]
Gold	May 2023	SEA Games, Phnom Penh	Hard	(Indonesia) Christopher Rungkat	(Thailand) Pruchya Isaro (Thailand) Peangtarn Plipuech	2–6, 6–4, [10–5]
Bronze	Dec 2025	SEA Games, Nonthaburi	Hard	(Indonesia) Christopher Rungkat	(Thailand) Pruchya Isaro (Thailand) Peangtarn Plipuech	6–4, 3–6, [5–10]

=== Billie Jean King Cup/Fed Cup participation ===
Sutjiadi made her Fed Cup debut at age 17 against Philippines at the 2013 Asia/Oceania Group II qualifying in Astana, Kazakhstan.

==== Singles (15–9) ====
Edition	Round	Date	Location	Against	Surface	Opponent	W/L	Score
2013	Z2 RR	Feb 2013	Astana (Kazakhstan)	Pakistan	Hard	Sara Mansoor	W	6–1, 6–0
2013	Z2 RR	Feb 2013	Astana (Kazakhstan)	Malaysia	Hard	Aslina An Ping Chua	W	6–2, 6–0
2013	Z2 RR	Feb 2013	Astana (Kazakhstan)	Iran	Hard	Arezoo Youlghouni	W	6–0, 6–0
2017	Z2 RR	Jul 2017	Dushanbe (Tajikistan)	Tajikistan	Hard	Takhmina Burkhanova	W	6–1, 6–3
2017	Z2 RR	Jul 2017	Dushanbe (Tajikistan)	Sri Lanka	Hard	Thisuri Molligoda	W	6–2, 6–3
2018	Z2 RR	Feb 2018	Isa Town (Bahrain)	Bahrain	Hard	Safa Safar	W	6–0, 6–0
2018	Z2 RR	Feb 2018	Isa Town (Bahrain)	Pakistan	Hard	Sarah Mahboob Khan	W	6–0, 6–2
2018	Z2 RR	Feb 2018	Isa Town (Bahrain)	Sri Lanka	Hard	Nethmi Himashi Waduge	W	6–0, 6–1
2018	Z2 P/O	Feb 2018	Isa Town (Bahrain)	Uzbekistan	Hard	Akgul Amanmuradova	W	6–2, 6–2
2019	Z1 RR	Feb 2019	Astana (Kazakhstan)	South Korea	Hard	Jang Su-jeong	L	3–6, 2–6
2019	Z1 RR	Feb 2019	Astana (Kazakhstan)	Pacific Oceania	Hard	Violet Apisah	W	6–4, 6–2
2019	Z1 RR	Feb 2019	Astana (Kazakhstan)	China	Hard	Yang Zhaoxuan	L	1–6, 4–6
2019	Z1 P/O	Feb 2019	Astana (Kazakhstan)	Thailand	Hard	Nudnida Luangnam	W	3–6, 6–0, 7–6^{(5)}
2020–21	Z1 RR	Mar 2020	Dubai (UAE)	Chinese Taipei	Hard	Liang En-shuo	W	6–2, 4–6, 6–2
2020–21	Z1 RR	Mar 2020	Dubai (UAE)	China	Hard	Wang Qiang	L	3–6, 3–6
2020–21	Z1 RR	Mar 2020	Dubai (UAE)	Uzbekistan	Hard	Akgul Amanmuradova	W	3–6, 7–5, 6–4
2020–21	Z1 RR	Mar 2020	Dubai (UAE)	South Korea	Hard	Han Na-lae	L	4–6, 1–6
2020–21	Z1 RR	Mar 2020	Dubai (UAE)	India	Hard	Ankita Raina	L	3–6, 3–6
2022	Z1 RR	Apr 2022	Antalya (Turkey)	South Korea	Clay	Jang Su-jeong	L	4–6, 1–6
2022	Z1 RR	Apr 2022	Antalya (Turkey)	Japan	Clay	Mai Hontama	L	2–6, 1–6
2022	Z1 RR	Apr 2022	Antalya (Turkey)	India	Clay	Ankita Raina	L	1–6, 2–6
2022	Z1 RR	Apr 2022	Antalya (Turkey)	China	Clay	Wang Qiang	L	5–7, 1–6
2022	Z1 RR	Apr 2022	Antalya (Turkey)	New Zealand	Clay	Katherine Westbury	W	6–1, 6–1
2026	Z1 RR	Apr 2026	New Delhi (India)	Mongolia	Hard	Anu-Vjin Gantor	W	6–0, 6–0

==== Doubles (9–5) ====
Edition	Stage	Date	Location	Against	Surface	Partner	Opponents	W/L	Score
2013	Z2 RR	Feb 2013	Astana (Kazakhstan)	Philippines	Hard	Lavinia Tananta	Marian Jade Capadocia; Anna Clarice Patrimonio	W	6–2, 6–0
2013	Z2 RR	Feb 2013	Astana (Kazakhstan)	Kyrgyzstan	Hard	Lavinia Tananta	Alina Beliaeva; Sabina Korsunova	W	6–1, 6–0
2013	Z2 RR	Feb 2013	Astana (Kazakhstan)	Iran	Hard	Ayu Fani Damayanti	Sahar Najaei; Maryam Mazaheri	W	6–0, 6–0
2017	Z2 RR	Jul 2017	Dushanbe (Tajikistan)	Kyrgyzstan	Hard	Jessy Rompies	Aigerim Akzhol Kyzy; Alina Lazareva	W	6–0, 6–0
2017	Z2 P/O	Jul 2017	Dushanbe (Tajikistan)	Uzbekistan	Hard	Jessy Rompies	Nigina Abduraimova; Akgul Amanmuradova	L	2–6, 4–6
2019	Z1 P/O	Feb 2019	Isa Town (Bahrain)	Thailand	Hard	Jessy Rompies	Nudnida Luangnam; Peangtarn Plipuech	W	6–2, 7–6^{(3)}
2020–21	Z1 RR	Mar 2020	Dubai (UAE)	Chinese Taipei	Hard	Priska Madelyn Nugroho	Latisha Chan; Yang Ya-yi	L	5–7, 5–7
2020–21	Z1 RR	Mar 2020	Dubai (UAE)	South Korea	Hard	Janice Tjen	Choi Ji-hee; Kim Na-ri	W	6–2, 6–0
2020–21	Z1 RR	Mar 2020	Dubai (UAE)	India	Hard	Priska Madelyn Nugroho	Sania Mirza; Ankita Raina	L	6–7^{(4)}, 0–6
2022	Z1 RR	Apr 2022	Antalya (Turkey)	India	Clay	Jessy Rompies	Sowjanya Bavisetti; Riya Bhatia	W	6–4, 6–7^{(7)}, 6–2
2022	Z1 RR	Apr 2022	Antalya (Turkey)	New Zealand	Clay	Jessy Rompies	Paige Hourigan; Erin Routliffe	L	3–6, 6–4, 6–7^{(3)}
2026	Z1 RR	Apr 2026	New Delhi (India)	New Zealand	Hard	Anjali Kirana Junarto	Monique Barry; Valentina Ivanov	L	6–4, 0–6, [6–10]
2026	Z1 RR	Apr 2026	New Delhi (India)	India	Hard	Janice Tjen	Rutuja Bhosale; Ankita Raina	W	6–3, 7–6^{(4)}
2026	Z1 RR	Apr 2026	New Delhi (India)	South Korea	Hard	Janice Tjen	Jeong Bo-young; Lee Eun-hye	W	6–4, 6–3

== Double bagel matches ==
=== Singles (6–0) ===
Result	Year	Tournament	Tier	Surface	Opponent	Rd	Ref
Win	2013	Fed Cup, Astana, Kazakhstan	Asia/Oceania Zone Group II	Hard	(Iran) Arezoo Youlghouni	RR	
Win	2018	Fed Cup, Isa Town, Bahrain	Asia/Oceania Zone Group II	Hard	(Bahrain) Safa Safar	RR	
Win	2018	ITF Orlando, United States	15,000	Clay	(Trinidad and Tobago) Yolande Leacock	1R	
Win	2018	ITF Nanjing, China	15,000	Hard	(China) Sheng Yuqi	1R	
Win	2018	ITF Muzaffarnagar, India	25,000	Grass	(India) Humera Baharmus	1R	
Win	2026	Billie Jean King Cup, New Delhi, India	Asia/Oceania Zone Group I	Hard	(Mongolia) Anu-Vjin Gantor	RR	

=== Doubles (3–0) ===
Result	Year	Tournament	Tier	Surface	Partner	Opponent	Rd	Ref
Win	2013	Fed Cup, Astana, Kazakhstan	Asia/Oceania Zone Group II	Hard	(Indonesia) Ayu-Fani Damayanti	(Iran) Sahar Najaei (Iran) Maryam Mazaheri	RR	
Win	2017	Fed Cup, Astana, Kazakhstan	Asia/Oceania Zone Group II	Hard	(Indonesia) Jessy Rompies	(Kyrgyzstan) Aigerim Akzhol Kyzy (Kyrgyzstan) Alina Lazareva	RR	
Win	2022	Las Vegas Open, US	60,000	Hard	(United States) Sophie Chang	(United States) Micheline Aubuchon (United States) Mary Lewis	1R	

== WTA Tour career earnings ==
Year	Grand Slam titles	WTA titles	Total titles	Earnings ($)	Money list rank
2018	0	0	0	8,713	659
2019	0	0	0	20,838	443
2020	0	0	0	2,736	613
2021	0	0	0	27,483	378
2022	0	1	1	92,544	267
2023	0	3	3	344,351	144
2024	0	1	1	267,391	170
2025	0	1	1	186,139	223
2026	0	2	2		
