= Priska Madelyn Nugroho =

Indonesian tennis player (born 2003)

- Country (sports): Indonesia
- Born: 29 May 2003 (age 23) Jakarta
- Turned pro: 2018
- Plays: Right (two-handed backhand)
- Prize money: $140,071

Singles
- Career record: 151–95
- Career titles: 11 ITF
- Highest ranking: No. 265 (17 July 2023)
- Current ranking: No. 486 (2 November 2026)

Doubles
- Career record: 123–54
- Career titles: 15 ITF
- Highest ranking: No. 185 (2 March 2026)
- Current ranking: No. 205 (3 August 2026)

Team competitions
- BJK Cup: 6–6
Medal record
Women's Tennis
Representing Indonesia
SEA Games
| Gold medal – first place | 2023 Cambodia | Singles |
| Gold medal – first place | 2023 Cambodia | Team |
| Gold medal – first place | 2025 Thailand | Team |
| Bronze medal – third place | 2025 Thailand | Doubles |
| Bronze medal – third place | 2019 Philippines | Singles |
- Last updated on: 3 August 2026.

Priska Madelyn Nugroho (born 29 May 2003) is an Indonesian tennis player. She has career-high WTA rankings of 265 in singles and 185 in doubles. Nugroho has won eleven titles in singles and fifteen in doubles on the ITF Women's World Tour.

== Career overview ==
At the age of 14, she won the WTA Future Stars event in the U-14 category at the 2017 WTA Finals in Singapore. In 2019 and 2023, Priska was selected to represent Indonesia at the SEA Games and won the bronze medal (2019) and gold medal (2023) in singles, saved 11 gold medal points in the later event. In 2020, partnering Alexandra Eala, she won the 2020 Australian Open girls' doubles title.

=== Junior Grand Slam performance ===
Singles:

- Australian Open: 3R (2020)
- French Open: 2R (2019)
- Wimbledon: QF (2019)
- US Open: QF (2019)

Doubles:

- Australian Open: W (2020)
- French Open: 1R (2021)
- Wimbledon: 2R (2021)
- US Open: –

=== Professional ===
Priska debuted as a professional in 2018, aged 15, at an ITF Circuit tournament in Solo, where she lost in the first round of singles and quarterfinal of doubles. In 2021, she reached her first pro circuit final in doubles alongside Federica Rossi at a $15k event in Amarante, Portugal in July, before winning her first title with Naho Sato at another $15k event in Frederiksberg, Denmark the following month. Priska reached her first singles final in Cairo, Egypt in November, losing to Carson Branstine.

In 2021, Nugroho began playing college tennis for the North Carolina State University in the Atlantic Coast Conference. In 2022, she completed her freshman year with a 23–8 win/loss record in singles ranked No. 89 nationally and a 26–4 win/loss record in doubles. She was named Freshman of the Year by the Atlantic Coast Conference in June 2022.

In October 2022, Priska played her first WTA Tour qualifying match in the first series of Jasmin Open, losing against Ana Konjuh 4–6, 2–6. She then qualified for her first $60k singles tournament also in Monastir, losing to Sara Errani in the quarterfinal match, after beating higher-ranked Suzan Lamens 6–4, 6–3 in the previous round. She followed this up by competing in two $60k tournaments in Australia, losing to Jaimee Fourlis in the second round of the Playford International and to Alexandra Bozovic in the first round of NSW Open in Sydney both in straight sets. These results brought Priska to a new career-high singles ranking of No. 512 on 7 November 2022, taking over as the top-ranked Indonesian player on tour in singles from Aldila Sutjiadi who had dropped to No. 525 on the same week.

Overall, between June and December 2022, Nugroho won three $15k titles in singles and four in doubles, two $25k singles titles, three $25k doubles titles, and her first $60k doubles title in Monastir, Tunisia. These results brought her to new career-high rankings of No. 275 in singles (achieved on 13 February 2023) and No. 197 in doubles (achieved on 30 January 2023).

Nugroho received a wildcard entry into the 2024 Jasmin Open but lost in the first round to Mai Hontama, in straight sets.

== ITF Circuit finals ==
=== Singles: 15 (11 titles, 4 runner-ups) ===
| Legend W50 tournaments (1–0) W25/35 tournaments (3–1) W15 tournaments (7–3) | Finals by surface Hard (11–3) Clay (0–1) |

| Result | W-L | Date | Tournament | Tier | Surface | Opponent | Score |
|---|---|---|---|---|---|---|---|
| Loss | 0–1 | Nov 2021 | ITF Cairo, Egypt | W15 | Clay | (Canada) Carson Branstine | 6–7^{(6)}, 1–6 |
| Loss | 0–2 | Jul 2022 | ITF Monastir, Tunisia | W15 | Hard | (Turkey) Zeynep Sönmez | 2–6, 6–4, 6–7^{(1)} |
| Win | 1–2 | Jul 2022 | ITF Monastir, Tunisia | W15 | Hard | (India) Vaidehi Chaudhari | 6–3, 1–6, 6–4 |
| Win | 2–2 | Jul 2022 | ITF Monastir, Tunisia | W15 | Hard | (Russia) Anastasiia Gureva | 6–2, 6–1 |
| Win | 3–2 | Aug 2022 | ITF Monastir, Tunisia | W15 | Hard | (Japan) Saki Imamura | 6–0, 6–3 |
| Win | 4–2 | Nov 2022 | ITF Traralgon, Australia | W25 | Hard | (United Kingdom) Naiktha Bains | 6–4, 6–4 |
| Win | 5–2 | Dec 2022 | ITF Solapur, India | W25 | Hard | (Finland) Anastasia Kulikova | 6–4, 6–2 |
| Loss | 5–3 | Dec 2022 | ITF Navi Mumbai, India | W25 | Hard | (Russia) Valeria Savinykh | 2–6, 6–7^{(4)} |
| Win | 6–3 | Jun 2024 | ITF Hong Kong | W15 | Hard | (Japan) Saki Imamura | 6–3, 6–4 |
| Loss | 6–4 | Jul 2024 | ITF Tianjin, China | W15 | Hard | (China) Huang Yujia | 5–7, 4–6 |
| Win | 7–4 | Aug 2024 | ITF Xiamen, China | W15 | Hard | (China) Tang Qianhui | 2–6, 6–4, 6–0 |
| Win | 8–4 | Dec 2024 | ITF Navi Mumbai, India | W50 | Hard | (Thailand) Thasaporn Naklo | 6–2, 7–6^{(3)} |
| Win | 9–4 | May 2025 | ITF Maanshan, China | W15 | Hard | (China) Zhu Chenting | 6–2, 6–4 |
| Win | 10–4 | May 2025 | ITF Maanshan, China | W15 | Hard | (Thailand) Peangtarn Plipuech | 6–1, 6–2 |
| Win | 11–4 | Jun 2026 | ITF Taipei, Taiwan | W35 | Hard | (Japan) Sakura Hosogi | 7–6^{(6)}, 6–3 |

=== Doubles: 26 (16 titles, 10 runner-ups) ===
| Legend W100 tournaments (0–3) W60/75 tournaments (2–1) W50 tournaments (1–0) W25/35 tournaments (6–3) W15 tournaments (7–3) | Finals by surface Hard (13–10) Clay (3–0) |

| Result | W–L | Date | Tournament | Tier | Surface | Partner | Opponents | Score |
|---|---|---|---|---|---|---|---|---|
| Loss | 0–1 | Jul 2021 | ITF Amarante, Portugal | W15 | Hard | (Italy) Federica Rossi | (France) Océane Babel (France) Lucie Nguyen Tan | 4–6, 2–6 |
| Win | 1–1 | Aug 2021 | ITF Frederiksberg, Denmark | W15 | Clay | (Japan) Naho Sato | (Ukraine) Viktoriia Dema (Bulgaria) Ani Vangelova | 6–0, 6–1 |
| Win | 2–1 | Aug 2021 | ITF Bad Waltersdorf, Austria | W15 | Clay | (South Korea) Ku Yeon-woo | (Italy) Arianna Zucchini (Italy) Giulia Crescenzi | 6–4, 6–3 |
| Win | 3–1 | Nov 2021 | ITF Sharm El Sheikh, Egypt | W15 | Hard | (Netherlands) Stéphanie Visscher | (Russia) Anna Ureke (South Korea) Lee So-ra | 6–4, 7–6^{(0)} |
| Win | 4–1 | Jun 2022 | ITF Gurugram, India | W25 | Hard | (Japan) Saki Imamura | (Japan) Misaki Matsuda (Japan) Momoko Kobori | 6–4, 7–5 |
| Win | 5–1 | Jul 2022 | ITF Gurugram, India | W25 | Hard | (India) Ankita Raina | (Japan) Misaki Matsuda (Japan) Momoko Kobori | 3–6, 6–0, [10–6] |
| Win | 6–1 | Jul 2022 | ITF Monastir, Tunisia | W15 | Hard | (China) Wei Sijia | (South Korea) Jeong Bo-young (South Korea) Back Da-yeon | 6–4, 6–1 |
| Win | 7–1 | Jul 2022 | ITF Monastir, Tunisia | W15 | Hard | (China) Wei Sijia | Anastasiia Gureva (Greece) Michaela Laki | 6–2, 4–6, [10–5] |
| Win | 8–1 | Aug 2022 | ITF Monastir, Tunisia | W15 | Hard | (Japan) Saki Imamura | (China) Yao Xinxin (France) Nina Radovanovic | 6–3, 6–2 |
| Win | 9–1 | Aug 2022 | ITF Monastir, Tunisia | W15 | Hard | (Japan) Saki Imamura | (Japan) Naho Sato (France) Yasmine Mansouri | 6–1, 6–3 |
| Loss | 9–2 | Oct 2022 | ITF Monastir, Tunisia | W15 | Hard | (China) Wei Sijia | (Chinese Taipei) Tsao Chia-yi (Chinese Taipei) Lee Ya-hsin | 6–1, 1–6, [3–10] |
| Win | 10–2 | Oct 2022 | Monastir Open, Tunisia | W60 | Hard | (China) Wei Sijia | (Netherlands) Suzan Lamens (Netherlands) Isabelle Haverlag | 6–3, 6–2 |
| Loss | 10–3 | Oct 2022 | Playford International, Australia | W60 | Hard | (South Korea) Han Na-lae | (Australia) Alexandra Bozovic (Australia) Talia Gibson | 5–7, 4–6 |
| Loss | 10–4 | Nov 2022 | ITF Traralgon, Australia | W25 | Hard | (India) Ankita Raina | (Australia) Destanee Aiava (New Zealand) Katherine Westbury | 1–6, 6–4, [5–10] |
| Loss | 10–5 | Dec 2022 | ITF Solapur, India | W25 | Hard | Ekaterina Yashina | (India) Ankita Raina (India) Prarthana Thombare | 1–6, 2–6 |
| Win | 11–5 | Dec 2022 | ITF Navi Mumbai, India | W25 | Hard | Ekaterina Yashina | (India) Ankita Raina (India) Prarthana Thombare | 6–3, 6–1 |
| Win | 12–5 | Mar 2025 | Jin'an Open, China | W75 | Hard | (India) Ankita Raina | Kristina Dmitruk; Kira Pavlova | 6–0, 6–3 |
| Loss | 12–6 | Jun 2025 | ITF Maanshan, China | W15 | Hard | (Indonesia) Janice Tjen | Anastasiia Grechkina; Kristina Sidorova | 3–6, 6–2, [6–10] |
| Win | 13–6 | Jun 2025 | ITF Luzhou, China | W35 | Hard | (Indonesia) Janice Tjen | (Japan) Saki Imamura (Japan) Ikumi Yamazaki | 6–4, 6–3 |
| Win | 14–6 | Jun 2025 | ITF Taizhou, China | W50 | Hard | (Indonesia) Janice Tjen | (China) Huang Yujia (China) Zheng Wushuang | 6–3, 6–4 |
| Win | 15–6 | Aug 2025 | ITF Erwitte, Germany | W35 | Clay | (Belgium) Tilwith Di Girolami | (Germany) Laura Boehner (Germany) Mina Hodzic | 7–6^{(10)}, 6–1 |
| Loss | 15–7 | Sep 2025 | Incheon Open, South Korea | W100 | Hard | (Japan) Hiroko Kuwata | (Japan) Saki Imamura (South Korea) Park So-hyun | 3–6, 6–4, [7–10] |
| Loss | 15–8 | Feb 2026 | ITF Bengaluru Open, India | W100 | Hard | (India) Ankita Raina | (Japan) Misaki Matsuda (Japan) Eri Shimizu | 4–6, 6–3, [5–10] |
| Loss | 15–9 | Mar 2026 | Jin'an Open, China | W100 | Hard | (Australia) Alexandra Osborne | Ekaterina Ovcharenko; Varvara Panshina | 2–6, 2–6 |
| Loss | 15–10 | Sep 2026 | ITF Shenyang, China | W35 | Hard | (China) Huang Yujia | (China) Wei Sijia (China) Yuan Chengyiyi | 6–3, 2–6, [8–10] |
| Win | 16–10 | Oct 2026 | ITF Qiandaohu, China | W35 | Hard | (China) Zheng Wushuang | Varvara Panshina; Rada Zolotareva | 6–0, 6–7^{(2)}, [10–3] |

== Junior Grand Slam tournament final ==
=== Doubles: 1 (title) ===
| Result | Year | Tournament | Surface | Partner | Opponents | Score |
|---|---|---|---|---|---|---|
| Win | 2020 | Australian Open | Hard | (Philippines) Alexandra Eala | (Slovenia) Živa Falkner (United Kingdom) Matilda Mutavdzic | 6–1, 6–2 |

== ITF Junior Circuit finals ==
=== Singles: 12 (7 titles, 5 runner-ups) ===
| Legend Category G1 / B1 Category G3 Category G4 Category G5 | Finals by surface Hard (5–4) Clay (2–1) |

| Result | W–L | Date | Tournament | Tier | Surface | Opponent | Score |
|---|---|---|---|---|---|---|---|
| Win | 1–0 | Jul 2016 | ITF Ho Chi Minh City, Vietnam | G5 | Hard | (Chinese Taipei) Lee Kuan-yi | 7–5, 7–6^{(4)} |
| Win | 2–0 | Jul 2016 | ITF Ho Chi Minh City, Vietnam | G5 | Hard | (Chinese Taipei) Wang Chao-yi | 7–6^{(6)}, 6–2 |
| Loss | 2–1 | Sep 2016 | ITF Colombo, Sri Lanka | G5 | Clay | (Netherlands) Daevenia Achong | 3–6, 1–6 |
| Win | 3–1 | May 2017 | ITF Trengganu, Malaysia | G4 | Hard | (India) Shivani Amineni | 2–6, 6–4, 6–2 |
| Win | 4–1 | Sep 2017 | ITF Colombo, Sri Lanka | G5 | Clay | (Hong Kong) Chui Kei Leung | 4–0, 5–4 |
| Win | 5–1 | Sep 2017 | ITF Colombo, Sri Lanka | G5 | Clay | (Australia) Sara Nayar | 6–1, 6–3 |
| Win | 6–1 | Mar 2018 | ITF Chengdu, China | G3 | Hard | (China) Xiao Zhenghua | 6–2, 5–7, 7–5 |
| Win | 7–1 | Jul 2018 | ITF Jakarta, Indonesia | G4 | Hard | (Philippines) Alexandra Eala | 6–2, 4–6, 6–1 |
| Loss | 7–2 | Jul 2018 | ITF Jakarta, Indonesia | G4 | Hard | (Indonesia) Fitriani Sabatini | 3–6, 6–4, 4–6 |
| Loss | 7–3 | Oct 2018 | ITF Sarawak, Malaysia | G3 | Hard | (Indonesia) Janice Tjen | 4–6, 3–6 |
| Loss | 7–4 | Oct 2018 | Asian Junior Championships | B1 | Hard | (Thailand) Mananchaya Sawangkaew | 6–7^{(5)}, 3–6 |
| Loss | 7–5 | Aug 2019 | ITF Nanjing, China | G1 | Hard | (Hong Kong) Cody Wong | 1–6, 0–1 ret. |

=== Doubles: 8 (5 titles, 3 runner-ups) ===
| Legend Category GA Category G3 Category G4 Category G5 | Finals by surface Hard (3–3) Clay (2–0) |

| Result | W–L | Date | Tournament | Tier | Surface | Partner | Opponents | Score |
|---|---|---|---|---|---|---|---|---|
| Win | 1–0 | Sep 2016 | ITF Colombo, Sri Lanka | G5 | Clay | (Chinese Taipei) Wang Chao-yi | (Chinese Taipei) Wei Ling-hsuan (Chinese Taipei) Weng Man-hsuan | 4–6, 6–4, [10–5] |
| Win | 2–0 | May 2017 | ITF Malacca, Malaysia | G4 | Hard | (India) Shivani Amineni | (China) Yujiao Che (China) Huang Jiaqi | 6–2, 6–3 |
| Loss | 2–1 | May 2017 | ITF Trengganu, Malaysia | G4 | Hard | (Singapore) Charmaine Shi Yi Seah | (India) Shivani Amineni (Thailand) Mai Napatt Nirundorn | 2–6, 6–4, [5–10] |
| Win | 3–1 | Sep 2017 | ITF Colombo, Sri Lanka | G5 | Clay | (Australia) Sara Nayar | (India) Sharannya Gaware (India) Annika Kannan | 6–1, 7–5 |
| Loss | 3–2 | Oct 2017 | ITF Sarawak, Malaysia | G3 | Hard | (Indonesia) Janice Tjen | (South Korea) Park So-hyun (Thailand) Mananchaya Sawangkaew | 4–6, 6–2, [5–10] |
| Loss | 3–3 | Jul 2018 | ITF Jakarta, Indonesia | G4 | Hard | (India) Vaidehi Chaudhari | (Indonesia) Fitriani Sabatini (Indonesia) Fitriana Sabrina | 3–6, 7–6^{(6)}, [3–10] |
| Win | 4–3 | Jul 2018 | ITF Jakarta, Indonesia | G4 | Hard | (India) Vaidehi Chaudhari | (Japan) Nanari Katsumi (Japan) Ai Yamaguchi | 6–4, 5–7, [10–8] |
| Win | 5–3 | Jan 2020 | Australian Open | GA | Hard | (Philippines) Alexandra Eala | (Slovenia) Živa Falkner (United Kingdom) Matilda Mutavdzic | 6–1, 6–2 |

== Other finals ==
=== Singles: 1 (title) ===
| Result | Date | Tournament | Surface | Opponent | Score |
|---|---|---|---|---|---|
| Win | Oct 2017 | WTA Future Stars (U–14), Singapore | Hard | (Thailand) Pimrada Jattavapornvanit | 6–3, 6–3 |

== National representation ==
=== Multi-sport event (individual) ===
Priska made her debut in multi-sport event at the 2019 SEA Games, where she won the bronze medal in women's singles.

==== Singles: 2 (1 gold medal, 1 bronze medal) ====
| Result | Date | Tournament | Surface | Opponent | Score |
|---|---|---|---|---|---|
| Bronze | Dec 2019 | SEA Games, Manila | Hard | (Vietnam) Savanna Lý Nguyễn | 4–6, 2–3 ret. |
| Gold | May 2023 | SEA Games, Phnom Penh | Hard | (Thailand) Lanlana Tararudee | 6–7^{(1)}, 7–6^{(4)}, 7–5 |

==== Doubles: 1 (bronze medal) ====
| Result | Date | Tournament | Surface | Partner | Opponents | Score |
|---|---|---|---|---|---|---|
| Bronze | Dec 2025 | SEA Games, Nonthaburi | Hard | (Indonesia) Anjali Kirana Junarto | (Thailand) Mananchaya Sawangkaew (Thailand) Peangtarn Plipuech | 6–7^{(5)}, 2–6 |

=== Billie Jean King Cup ===
Priska made her Billie Jean King Cup debut at age 17 against Chinese Taipei at the 2020-2021 Asia/Oceania Group I qualifying in Dubai, United Arab Emirates.

==== Singles (5–3) ====
| Edition | Round | Date | Location | Against | Surface | Opponent | W/L | Score |
|---|---|---|---|---|---|---|---|---|
| 2020–21 | Z1 RR | Mar 2020 | Dubai (UAE) | Chinese Taipei | Hard | Yang Ya-yi | W | 6–4, 6–7^{(10)}, 6–0 |
| 2020–21 | Z1 RR | Mar 2020 | Dubai (UAE) | Uzbekistan | Hard | Nigina Abduraimova | W | 6–0, 6–4 |
| 2020–21 | Z1 RR | Mar 2020 | Dubai (UAE) | South Korea | Hard | Jang Su-jeong | L | 5–7, 3–6 |
| 2020–21 | Z1 RR | Mar 2020 | Dubai (UAE) | India | Hard | Rutuja Bhosale | W | 6–3, 0–6, 6–3 |
| 2026 | Z1 RR | Apr 2026 | New Delhi (India) | New Zealand | Hard | Aishi Das | W | 6–4, 6–1 |
| 2026 | Z1 RR | Apr 2026 | New Delhi (India) | India | Hard | Vaishnavi Adkar | W | 6–7^{(3)}, 7–6^{(3)}, 6–3 |
| 2026 | Z1 RR | Apr 2026 | New Delhi (India) | South Korea | Hard | Back Da-yeon | L | 5–7, 6–3, 2–6 |
| 2026 | Z1 RR | Apr 2026 | New Delhi (India) | Thailand | Hard | Thasaporn Naklo | L | 3–2 ret |

==== Doubles (1–3) ====
| Edition | Stage | Date | Location | Against | Surface | Partner | Opponents | W/L | Score |
|---|---|---|---|---|---|---|---|---|---|
| 2020–21 | Z1 RR | Mar 2020 | Dubai (UAE) | Chinese Taipei | Hard | Aldila Sutjiadi | Latisha Chan; Yang Ya-yi | L | 5–7, 5–7 |
| 2020–21 | Z1 RR | Mar 2020 | Dubai (UAE) | China | Hard | Janice Tjen | Xu Yifan; Zhang Shuai | L | 1–6, 4–6 |
| 2020–21 | Z1 RR | Mar 2020 | Dubai (UAE) | Uzbekistan | Hard | Janice Tjen | Yasmina Karimjanova; Sitora Normuradova | W | 6–1, 6–3 |
| 2020–21 | Z1 RR | Mar 2020 | Dubai (UAE) | India | Hard | Aldila Sutjiadi | Sania Mirza; Ankita Raina | L | 6–7^{(4)}, 0–6 |

== Double bagel matches ==
=== Singles (3–0) ===
| Result | Year | Tournament | Tier | Surface | Opponent | Rd | Ref |
|---|---|---|---|---|---|---|---|
| Win | 2022 | ITF Monastir, Tunisia | W15 | Hard | (France) Souhila Aouni | 1R | |
| Win | 2023 | ITF Daegu, South Korea | W25 | Hard | (South Korea) Kil Hee-won | 1R | |
| Win | 2024 | ITF Tianjin, China | W35 | Hard | (China) Zhang Peiyao | 1R | |

=== Doubles (4–0) ===
| Result | Year | Tournament | Tier | Surface | Partner | Opponent | Rd | Ref |
|---|---|---|---|---|---|---|---|---|
| Win | 2022 | ITF Monastir, Tunisia | W15 | Hard | (China) Wei Sijia | (India) Akanksha Dileep Nitture (Italy) Ilaria Sposetti | 1R | |
| Win | 2022 | ITF Monastir, Tunisia | W15 | Hard | (China) Wei Sijia | (Australia) Lisa Mays (South Korea) Hwiwon Wi | SF | |
| Win | 2025 | ITF Maanshan, China | W15 | Hard | (Indonesia) Janice Tjen | (China) Wang Yuping (China) Xiao Zhenghua | SF | |
| Win | 2025 | ITF Erwitte, Germany | W35 | Clay | (Belgium) Tilwith Di Girolami | (Germany) Franziska Louise Koehler (Germany) Leticia Solakov | SF | |

== Honors and awards ==
| Award | Year | Category | Result | Ref. |
|---|---|---|---|---|
| Fed Cup Awards | 2020 | Fed Cup Heart Award | Nominated | |
| Atlantic Coast Conference Awards | 2022 | ACC Women's Tennis Freshman of the Week (25 January) | Won | |
| Atlantic Coast Conference Awards | 2022 | ACC Women's Tennis Freshman of the Week (22 February) | Won | |
| Atlantic Coast Conference Awards | 2022 | ACC Women's Tennis Freshman of the Week (5 April) | Won | |
| Atlantic Coast Conference Awards | 2022 | ACC Women's Tennis Freshman of the Week (12 April) | Won | |
| Atlantic Coast Conference Awards | 2022 | ACC Women's Tennis Freshman of the Week (19 April) | Won | |
| Atlantic Coast Conference Awards | 2022 | ACC Women's Freshman of the Year | Won | |
| Atlantic Coast Conference Awards | 2022 | All ACC, Second Team | Honored | |
