= Thasaporn Naklo =

Thai tennis player

- Native name: ทรรศพร นาคหล่อ
- Country (sports): Thailand
- Born: 20 August 2001 (age 25) Bangkok, Thailand
- College: Iowa State University
- Prize money: $62,753

Singles
- Career record: 85–67
- Career titles: 3 ITF
- Highest ranking: No. 332 (15 July 2024)
- Current ranking: No. 542 (17 November 2025)

Doubles
- Career record: 43–42
- Career titles: 3 ITF
- Highest ranking: No. 362 (10 November 2025)
- Current ranking: No. 364 (17 November 2025)
- Last updated on: 17 November 2025.

Thasaporn Naklo (Thai: ทรรศพร นาคหล่อ; born 20 August 2001) is a Thai tennis player. She has a career-high WTA singles ranking of world No. 332, achieved on 15 July 2024, and a best doubles ranking of No. 362, achieved on 10 November 2025. She has won three singles and doubles titles on the ITF Circuit. She plays college tennis on the Iowa State Cyclones team.

== Career ==
In October 2023, Naklo won her first major ITF title at the W40 singles tournament in Shenzhen, China.

In January 2024, for her WTA Tour debut, she received a main-draw wildcard at the 2024 Thailand Open in Hua Hin and lost in round one to Yulia Putintseva in three sets.

In September 2024, Naklo also received a wildcard for the second tournament in 2024 also held in Hua Hin. She lost in the first round to fellow Thai wildcard entrant Lanlana Tararudee.

== ITF Circuit finals ==
=== Singles: 11 (5 titles, 6 runner–ups) ===
Legend W40/50 tournaments (1–1) W25/35 tournaments (0–2) W15 tournaments (5–3)	Finals by surface Hard (5–5) Carpet (0–1)

Result	W–L	Date	Tournament	Tier	Surface	Opponent	Score
Loss	0–1	Jun 2022	ITF Chiang Rai, Thailand	W15	Hard	(Japan) Ramu Ueda	6–2, 2–6, 6–7^{(3)}
Win	1–1	Jul 2023	ITF Sapporo, Japan	W15	Hard	(Japan) Mei Hasegawa	6–1, 6–2
Win	2–1	Jul 2023	ITF Sapporo, Japan	W15	Hard	(Japan) Rinon Okuwaki	6–2, 6–3
Loss	2–2	Oct 2023	ITF Makinohara, Japan	W25	Carpet	(Japan) Sara Saito	4–6, 3–6
Win	3–2	Oct 2023	ITF Shenzhen, China	W40	Hard	(China) Shi Han	6–3, 7–5
Loss	3–3	Oct 2024	ITF Huzhou, China	W35	Hard	(Hong Kong) Cody Wong	6–7^{(5)}, 3–6
Loss	3–4	Dec 2024	ITF Navi Mumbai, India	W50	Hard	(Indonesia) Priska Nugroho	2–6, 6–7^{(3)}
Loss	3–5	Nov 2025	ITF Hua Hin, Thailand	W15	Hard	(Thailand) Anchisa Chanta	1–6, 6–1, 3–6
Loss	3–6	Aug 2026	ITF Tianjin, China	W15	Hard	(China) Yuan Chengyiyi	6–3, 1–6, 4–6
Win	4–6	Oct 2026	ITF Singapore	W15	Hard (i)	(Papua New Guinea) Violet Apisah	6–2, 6–2
Win	5–6	Nov 2026	ITF Ma'anshan, China	W15	Hard (i)	(China) Luo Xi	7–5, 7–5

=== Doubles: 9 (6 titles, 3 runner-up) ===
Legend W35 tournaments (1–0) W15 tournaments (5–3)	Finals by surface Hard (6–3)

Result	W–L	Date	Tournament	Tier	Surface	Partner	Opponents	Score
Win	1–0	Apr 2019	ITF Sharm El Sheikh, Egypt	W15	Hard	(Thailand) Mananchaya Sawangkaew	(Slovakia) Katarína Kužmová (Kazakhstan) Zhibek Kulambayeva	6–3, 7–5
Win	2–0	Jul 2023	ITF Sharm El Sheikh, Egypt	W15	Hard	(Japan) Ayumi Miyamoto	(China) Jiangxue Han (Japan) Mao Mushika	6–2, 6–4
Win	3–0	Dec 2024	ITF Solapur, India	W35	Hard	(Thailand) Bunyawi Thamchaiwat	(India) Akanksha Dileep Nitture (India) Soha Sadiq	6–4, 6–2
Loss	3–1	Jul 2025	ITF Nakhon Pathom, Thailand	W15	Hard	(Thailand) Bunyawi Thamchaiwat	(South Korea) Kim Na-ri (China) Ye Qiuyu	2–6, 3–6
Loss	3–2	Nov 2025	ITF Hua Hin, Thailand	W15	Hard	(Thailand) Lidia Podgorichani	(Thailand) Patcharin Cheapchandej (Thailand) Kamonwan Yodpetch	2–6, 3–6
Win	4–2	Feb 2026	ITF Gurugram, India	W15	Hard	(Thailand) Anchisa Chanta	Arina Arifullina; Evgeniya Burdina	6–4, 7–6^{(0)}
Win	5–2	May 2026	ITF Nakhon Pathom, Thailand	W15	Hard	(Thailand) Anchisa Chanta	(South Korea) Im Hee-rae (South Korea) Kim Eun-chae	6–2, 6–1
Loss	5–3	May 2026	ITF Nakhon Pathom, Thailand	W15	Hard	(Thailand) Anchisa Chanta	(Thailand) Lunda Kumhom (Thailand) Kamonwan Yodpetch	5–7, 7–6^{(4)}, [7–10]
Win	6–3	Oct 2026	ITF Singapore	W15	Hard	(Thailand) Anchisa Chanta	(Chinese Taipei) Lin Fang-an (China) Lu Jingjing	6–1, 6–3
