= 2025 Incheon Open – Singles =

Singles
- 2025 Incheon Open

Final
- Champion: (Japan) Nao Hibino
- Runner-up: (South Korea) Lee Eun-hye
- Score: 7–5, 7–6^{(7–2)}

Events
Singles	Doubles
← 2024 ·	Incheon Open	· 2026 →

Tatiana Prozorova was the defending champion but chose not to participate.

Nao Hibino won the title, defeating Lee Eun-hye 7–5, 7–6^{(7–2)} in the final.

== Seeds ==
1. (Japan) Nao Hibino (champion)
2. (United States) Hanna Chang (first round)
3. (Japan) Sara Saito (semifinals)
4. (Japan) Haruka Kaji (semifinals)
5. (Japan) Sakura Hosogi (second round)
6. (South Korea) Park So-hyun (first round)
7. (South Korea) Ku Yeon-woo (quarterfinals)
8. (South Korea) Back Da-yeon (first round)

== Draw ==
=== Key ===
- Q = Qualifier
- WC = Wild card
- LL = Lucky loser
- Alt = Alternate
- ITF = ITF entry
- PR = Protected ranking
- SR = Special ranking
- SE = Special exempt
- JE = Junior exempt
- JR = Junior Accelerator Programme entrant
- CO = College Accelerator Programme entrant
- NG = Next Gen Accelerator Program entrant
- w/o = Walkover
- r = Retired
- d = Defaulted

=== Finals ===
Semifinals
1	(Japan) Nao Hibino	6	6
3	(Japan) Sara Saito	4	1
4	(Japan) Haruka Kaji	5	1
(South Korea) Lee Eun-hye	7	6

Final
1	(Japan) Nao Hibino	7	7^{7}
(South Korea) Lee Eun-hye	5	6^{2}

=== Top half ===
First round
1	(Japan) N Hibino	6	6
(Australia) P Hule	3	0
(Japan) E Shimizu	6	6
LL	(Japan) C Muramatsu	3	2
(Japan) A Koshiishi	4	6	2
Q	(Japan) M Matsuda	6	4	6
WC	(South Korea) D-b Kim	3	1
7	(South Korea) Y-w Ku	6	6
3	(Japan) S Saito	6	6
WC	(South Korea) S-j Jang	3	3
Q	(Japan) N Kawaguchi	6	7
SR	(Chinese Taipei) Y-h Lee	1	5
Q	(China) Y Dang	6	6
(Japan) H Sato	4	2
Q	(South Korea) O-y Choi	2	1
5	(Japan) S Hosogi	6	6

Second round
1	(Japan) N Hibino	6	6
(Japan) E Shimizu	3	4
Q	(Japan) M Matsuda	2	3
7	(South Korea) Y-w Ku	6	6
3	(Japan) S Saito	6	6
Q	(Japan) N Kawaguchi	4	4
Q	(China) Y Dang	6	1	7^{7}
5	(Japan) S Hosogi	2	6	6^{4}

Quarterfinals
1	(Japan) N Hibino	4	6	6
7	(South Korea) Y-w Ku	6	2	2
3	(Japan) S Saito	6	6
Q	(China) Y Dang	4	0

Semifinals
1	(Japan) N Hibino	6	6
3	(Japan) S Saito	4	1

=== Bottom half ===
First round
8	(South Korea) D-y Back	0	6	3
(Japan) M Kobori	6	3	6
(Japan) M Kuramochi	6	6
Q	J Kolodynska	4	3
WC	(South Korea) S-y Choi	6	6^{2}	6^{5}
Q	(United States) A Zhu	2	7^{7}	7^{7}
Q	(Thailand) P Plipuech	4	6^{4}
4	(Japan) H Kaji	6	7^{7}
6	(South Korea) S-h Park	4	1
(South Korea) E-h Lee	6	6
(Indonesia) PM Nugroho	1	6	5
Q	V Panshina	6	2	7
WC	(South Korea) B-y Jeong	6	5	4
LL	(Thailand) T Naklo	1	7	6
(Japan) S Imamura	6	6
2	(United States) H Chang	2	3

Second round
(Japan) M Kobori	3	3
(Japan) M Kuramochi	6	6
Q	(United States) A Zhu	3	4
4	(Japan) H Kaji	6	6
(South Korea) E-h Lee	6	6
Q	V Panshina	0	0
LL	(Thailand) T Naklo	2	3
(Japan) S Imamura	6	6

Quarterfinals
(Japan) M Kuramochi	4	3
4	(Japan) H Kaji	6	6
(South Korea) E-h Lee	6	6
(Japan) S Imamura	1	3

Semifinals
4	(Japan) H Kaji	5	1
(South Korea) E-h Lee	7	6
