= 2025 Incheon Open – Doubles =

Doubles
- 2025 Incheon Open

Final
- Champions: (Japan) Saki Imamura (South Korea) Park So-hyun
- Runners-up: (Japan) Hiroko Kuwata (Indonesia) Priska Nugroho
- Score: 6–3, 4–6, [10–7]

Events
Singles	Doubles
← 2024 ·	Incheon Open	· 2026 →

Tang Qianhui and Zheng Wushuang were the defending champions but they chose not to participate.

Saki Imamura and Park So-hyun won the title, defeating Hiroko Kuwata and Priska Nugroho in the final, 6–3, 4–6, [10–7].

== Seeds ==
1. (Japan) Momoko Kobori / (Thailand) Peangtarn Plipuech (semifinals)
2. (Japan) Saki Imamura / (South Korea) Park So-hyun (champions)
3. (Japan) Hiroko Kuwata / (Indonesia) Priska Nugroho (final)
4. (Australia) Petra Hule / Kira Pavlova (first round)

== Draw ==
=== Key ===
- Q = Qualifier
- WC = Wild card
- LL = Lucky loser
- Alt = Alternate
- ITF = ITF entry
- PR = Protected ranking
- SR = Special ranking
- SE = Special exempt
- JE = Junior exempt
- JR = Junior Accelerator Programme entrant
- CO = College Accelerator Programme entrant
- NG = Next Gen Accelerator Program entrant
- w/o = Walkover
- r = Retired
- d = Defaulted

First round
1	(Japan) M Kobori (Thailand) P Plipuech	6	6
(South Korea) S-y Choi (United States) A Zhu	1	2
WC	(South Korea) J-m Kwon (South Korea) E-b Lee	0	1
Alt	(South Korea) O-y Choi (South Korea) Y-j Kim	6	6
3	(Japan) H Kuwata (Indonesia) PM Nugroho	7	6
WC	(South Korea) H-r Im (South Korea) D-b Kim	5	1
(South Korea) D-y Back (South Korea) E-h Lee	6	3	[11]
V Panshina; D Zelinskaya	3	6	[9]
(South Korea) Y-w Ku (Japan) E Shimizu	6	6
(Japan) S Akita (Japan) C Muramatsu	4	3
(Japan) N Kawaguchi (Japan) H Sato	6	6
4	(Australia) P Hule; K Pavlova	4	1
(China) Y Dang (Thailand) T Naklo	2^{r}
(Japan) S Hosogi (Japan) M Matsuda	1
(South Korea) B-y Jeong (Japan) A Koshiishi	2	2
2	(Japan) S Imamura (South Korea) S-h Park	6	6

Quarterfinals
1	(Japan) M Kobori (Thailand) P Plipuech	w/o
Alt	(South Korea) O-y Choi (South Korea) Y-j Kim
3	(Japan) H Kuwata (Indonesia) PM Nugroho	6	1	[10]
(South Korea) D-y Back (South Korea) E-h Lee	2	6	[7]
(South Korea) Y-w Ku (Japan) E Shimizu	6	6
(Japan) N Kawaguchi (Japan) H Sato	2	4
(Japan) S Hosogi (Japan) M Matsuda	6	3	[5]
2	(Japan) S Imamura (South Korea) S-h Park	4	6	[10]

Semifinals
1	(Japan) M Kobori (Thailand) P Plipuech	3	5
3	(Japan) H Kuwata (Indonesia) PM Nugroho	6	7
(South Korea) Y-w Ku (Japan) E Shimizu	5	4
2	(Japan) S Imamura (South Korea) S-h Park	7	6

Final
3	(Japan) H Kuwata (Indonesia) PM Nugroho	3	6	[7]
2	(Japan) S Imamura (South Korea) S-h Park	6	4	[10]
