= 2025 Korea Open – Singles =

Singles
- 2025 Korea Open

Final
- Champion: (Poland) Iga Świątek
- Runner-up: Ekaterina Alexandrova
- Score: 1–6, 7–6^{(7–3)}, 7–5

Details
- Draw: 28
- Seeds: 8

Events
Singles	Doubles
← 2024 ·	Korea Open	· 2026 →

Iga Świątek defeated Ekaterina Alexandrova in the final, 1–6, 7–6^{(7–3)}, 7–5 to win the singles tennis title at the 2025 Korea Open. It was her 25th career WTA Tour singles title. This marked the first time in Świątek's career that she won a final from a set down.

Beatriz Haddad Maia was the defending champion, but lost in the second round to Ella Seidel.

== Seeds ==
The top four seeds received a bye into the second round.

1. (Poland) Iga Świątek (champion)
2. Ekaterina Alexandrova (final)
3. (Denmark) Clara Tauson (quarterfinals)
4. (Australia) Daria Kasatkina (second round)
5. Diana Shnaider (second round)
6. (Brazil) Beatriz Haddad Maia (second round)
7. (United States) Sofia Kenin (second round)
8. (United Kingdom) Emma Raducanu (second round)

== Draw ==
=== Key ===
- Q = Qualifier
- WC = Wild card
- LL = Lucky loser
- Alt = Alternate
- ITF = ITF entry
- PR = Protected ranking
- SR = Special ranking
- SE = Special exempt
- JE = Junior exempt
- JR = Junior Accelerator Programme entrant
- CO = College Accelerator Programme entrant
- NG = Next Gen Accelerator Program entrant
- w/o = Walkover
- r = Retired
- d = Defaulted

=== Finals ===
Semifinals
1	(Poland) Iga Świątek	6	6
(Australia) Maya Joint	0	2
Q	(Czech Republic) Kateřina Siniaková	4	2
2	Ekaterina Alexandrova	6	6

Final
1	(Poland) Iga Świątek	1	7^{7}	7
2	Ekaterina Alexandrova	6	6^{3}	5

=== Top half ===
First round
LL	A Zakharova	3	1
PR	(Romania) S Cîrstea	6	6
(Czech Republic) B Krejčíková	6	6
Q	T Prozorova	1	2
(Romania) J Cristian	3	4
8/WC	(United Kingdom) E Raducanu	6	6
(United States) A Krueger	3	4
(Germany) E Lys	6	6
(Australia) M Joint	6	7^{7}
Q	(Czech Republic) L Fruhvirtová	4	6^{4}
(Germany) L Siegemund	6	3	5
7	(United States) S Kenin	2	6	7

Second round
1	(Poland) I Świątek	6	6
PR	(Romania) S Cîrstea	3	2
(Czech Republic) B Krejčíková	4	7^{12}	6
8/WC	(United Kingdom) E Raducanu	6	6^{10}	1
3	(Denmark) C Tauson	6	7^{7}
(Germany) E Lys	2	6^{4}
(Australia) M Joint	6	6
7	(United States) S Kenin	3	1

Quarterfinals
1	(Poland) I Świątek	6	6
(Czech Republic) B Krejčíková	0	3
3	(Denmark) C Tauson	0	3
(Australia) M Joint	6	6

Semifinals
1	(Poland) I Świątek	6	6
(Australia) M Joint	0	2

=== Bottom half ===
First round
5	D Shnaider	2	6	6
Q	(United States) C McNally	6	2	4
(Netherlands) S Lamens	6	6
(Germany) T Maria	4	1
Q	(Czech Republic) K Siniaková	6	6
WC	(South Korea) S-h Park	2	2
6	(Brazil) B Haddad Maia	6	6
WC	(South Korea) D-y Back	4	3
Q	(France) J Ponchet	7	4	2
Q	(Germany) E Seidel	5	6	6
(France) L Boisson	6	6
WC	(South Korea) Y-w Ku	2	1

Second round
5	D Shnaider	4	4
(Netherlands) S Lamens	6	6
Q	(Czech Republic) K Siniaková	7^{7}	6
4	(Australia) D Kasatkina	6^{2}	2
6	(Brazil) B Haddad Maia	7^{7}	6^{3}	5
Q	(Germany) E Seidel	6^{4}	7^{7}	7
(France) L Boisson	6	2	2
2	E Alexandrova	4	6	6

Quarterfinals
(Netherlands) S Lamens	1	5
Q	(Czech Republic) K Siniaková	6	7
Q	(Germany) E Seidel	2	3
2	E Alexandrova	6	6

Semifinals
Q	(Czech Republic) K Siniaková	4	2
2	E Alexandrova	6	6

== Qualifying ==
=== Seeds ===
1. (United States) Alycia Parks (first round)
2. (Netherlands) Suzan Lamens (moved to main draw)
3. Anna Blinkova (first round)
4. (Czech Republic) Kateřina Siniaková (qualified)
5. Anastasia Zakharova (qualifying competition, lucky loser)
6. (France) Varvara Gracheva (first round)
7. (United States) Caty McNally (qualified)
8. (Germany) Ella Seidel (qualified)
9. (United States) Katie Volynets (qualifying competition)
10. (Australia) Talia Gibson (qualifying competition)
11. (Argentina) María Lourdes Carlé (first round)
12. (Czech Republic) Linda Fruhvirtová (qualified)

=== Qualifiers ===
1. (Czech Republic) Linda Fruhvirtová
2. (United States) Caty McNally
3. (France) Jessika Ponchet
4. (Czech Republic) Kateřina Siniaková
5. (Germany) Ella Seidel
6. Tatiana Prozorova

=== Lucky loser ===
1. Anastasia Zakharova

=== Qualifying draw ===
==== First qualifier ====
First round
1	(United States) Alycia Parks	4	6^{4}
(France) Chloé Paquet	6	7^{7}
WC	(South Korea) Jeong Bo-young	4	2
12	(Czech Republic) Linda Fruhvirtová	6	6

Qualifying competition
(France) Chloé Paquet	4	6	3
12	(Czech Republic) Linda Fruhvirtová	6	4	6

==== Second qualifier ====
First round
Alt	(Chinese Taipei) Liang En-shuo	7^{7}	6
WC	(South Korea) Lee Eun-hye	6^{4}	3
(China) Wang Yafan	4	1
7	(United States) Caty McNally	6	6

Qualifying competition
Alt	(Chinese Taipei) Liang En-shuo	3	3
7	(United States) Caty McNally	6	6

==== Third qualifier ====
First round
3	Anna Blinkova	3	7	3
(Japan) Kyōka Okamura	6	5	6
(France) Jessika Ponchet	6	7
11	(Argentina) María Lourdes Carlé	2	5

Qualifying competition
(Japan) Kyōka Okamura	6	6^{5}	2
(France) Jessika Ponchet	4	7^{7}	6

==== Fourth qualifier ====
First round
4	(Czech Republic) Kateřina Siniaková	6	6
(Australia) Astra Sharma	4	4
WC	(South Korea) Jang Su-jeong	3	6	2
10	(Australia) Talia Gibson	6	4	6

Qualifying competition
4	(Czech Republic) Kateřina Siniaková	6	6
10	(Australia) Talia Gibson	1	2

==== Fifth qualifier ====
First round
5	Anastasia Zakharova	6	7
WC	(South Korea) Jang Ga-eul	3	5
(Japan) Mai Hontama	2	6	6^{7}
8	(Germany) Ella Seidel	6	3	7^{9}

Qualifying competition
5	Anastasia Zakharova	6	3	3
8	(Germany) Ella Seidel	3	6	6

==== Sixth qualifier ====
First round
6	(France) Varvara Gracheva	3	3
Tatiana Prozorova	6	6
(United States) Hanna Chang	3	1
9	(United States) Katie Volynets	6	6

Qualifying competition
Tatiana Prozorova	6	6
9	(United States) Katie Volynets	4	1
