= 2025 Korea Open – Doubles =

Doubles
- 2025 Korea Open

Final
- Champions: (Czech Republic) Barbora Krejčíková (Czech Republic) Kateřina Siniaková
- Runners-up: (Australia) Maya Joint (United States) Caty McNally
- Score: 6–3, 7–6^{(8–6)}

Details
- Draw: 16
- Seeds: 4

Events
Singles	Doubles
← 2024 ·	Korea Open	· 2026 →

Barbora Krejčíková and Kateřina Siniaková defeated Maya Joint and Caty McNally in the final, 6–3, 7–6^{(8–6)} to win the doubles tennis title at the 2025 Korea Open. It was the pair's first title in over a year. With the win, Siniaková regained the world No. 1 doubles ranking from her regular partner Taylor Townsend.

Nicole Melichar-Martinez and Liudmila Samsonova were the reigning champions, but chose not to participate this year.

== Seeds ==
1. (Australia) Ellen Perez / (Hungary) Fanny Stollár (first round)
2. (Brazil) Beatriz Haddad Maia / (Germany) Laura Siegemund (withdrew)
3. (Slovakia) Tereza Mihalíková / (United Kingdom) Olivia Nicholls (quarterfinals)
4. (Japan) Miyu Kato / (Chinese Taipei) Wu Fang-hsien (first round)

== Draw ==
=== Key ===
- Q = Qualifier
- WC = Wild card
- LL = Lucky loser
- Alt = Alternate
- ITF = ITF entry
- PR = Protected ranking
- SR = Special ranking
- SE = Special exempt
- JE = Junior exempt
- JR = Junior Accelerator Programme entrant
- CO = College Accelerator Programme entrant
- NG = Next Gen Accelerator Program entrant
- w/o = Walkover
- r = Retired
- d = Defaulted

=== Draw ===
First round
1	(Australia) E Perez (Hungary) F Stollár	6^{2}	4
(Romania) J Cristian (Chinese Taipei) S-w Hsieh	7^{7}	6
(Czech Republic) B Krejčíková (Czech Republic) K Siniaková	6	6
A Blinkova (Japan) M Ninomiya	4	3
4	(Japan) M Kato (Chinese Taipei) F-h Wu	3	6	[4]
(China) Y Xu (China) Z Yang	6	4	[10]
WC	(South Korea) D-y Back (South Korea) E-h Lee	2	1
(Norway) U Eikeri (China) Q Tang	6	6
(Chinese Taipei) H-c Chan (Denmark) C Tauson	6	6
(France) L Boisson (Netherlands) S Lamens	2	2
I Khromacheva (United States) A Krueger	5	6^{4}
3	(Slovakia) T Mihalíková (United Kingdom) O Nicholls	7	7^{7}
(Australia) M Joint (United States) C McNally	6	5	[10]
(Poland) K Piter (United States) S Santamaria	2	7	[8]

Quarterfinals
(Romania) J Cristian (Chinese Taipei) S-w Hsieh	4	6^{3}
(Czech Republic) B Krejčíková (Czech Republic) K Siniaková	6	7^{7}
(China) Y Xu (China) Z Yang	6	6
(Norway) U Eikeri (China) Q Tang	1	3
(Chinese Taipei) H-c Chan (Denmark) C Tauson	6^{2}	6	[10]
3	(Slovakia) T Mihalíková (United Kingdom) O Nicholls	7^{7}	1	[8]
(Australia) M Joint (United States) C McNally	6^{4}	6	[10]
(Mexico) G Olmos (Indonesia) A Sutjiadi	7^{7}	4	[8]

Semifinals
(Czech Republic) B Krejčíková (Czech Republic) K Siniaková	6	7
(China) Y Xu (China) Z Yang	2	5
(Chinese Taipei) H-c Chan (Denmark) C Tauson	2	1
(Australia) M Joint (United States) C McNally	6	6

Final
(Czech Republic) B Krejčíková (Czech Republic) K Siniaková	6	7^{8}
(Australia) M Joint (United States) C McNally	3	6^{6}
