= 2024 Incheon Open – Doubles =

Doubles
- 2024 Incheon Open

Final
- Champions: (China) Tang Qianhui (China) Zheng Wushuang
- Runners-up: (China) Feng Shuo (Japan) Aoi Ito
- Score: 6–2, 6–3

Events
Singles	Doubles
← 2023 ·	Incheon Open	· 2025 →

Choi Ji-hee and Ku Yeon-woo were the defending champions but Choi chose not to participate. Ku partnered alongside Han Na-lae, but they lost in the first round to Cho I-hsuan and Cho Yi-tsen.

Tang Qianhui and Zheng Wushuang won the title, defeating Feng Shuo and Aoi Ito in the final, 6–2, 6–3.

== Seeds ==
1. (China) Tang Qianhui / (China) Zheng Wushuang (champions)
2. (Chinese Taipei) Liang En-shuo / (South Korea) Park So-hyun (semifinals)
3. (Netherlands) Arianne Hartono / (India) Prarthana Thombare (semifinals)
4. (China) Feng Shuo / (Japan) Aoi Ito (final)

== Draw ==
=== Key ===
- Q = Qualifier
- WC = Wild card
- LL = Lucky loser
- Alt = Alternate
- ITF = ITF entry
- PR = Protected ranking
- SR = Special ranking
- SE = Special exempt
- JE = Junior exempt
- JR = Junior Accelerator Programme entrant
- CO = College Accelerator Programme entrant
- NG = Next Gen Accelerator Program entrant
- w/o = Walkover
- r = Retired
- d = Defaulted

First round
1	(China) Q Tang (China) W Zheng	3	6	[10]
K Pavlova; T Prozorova	6	2	[8]
(South Korea) D-y Back (Japan) M Kawamura	6	1	[10]
(Thailand) P Plipuech (Thailand) L Tararudee	3	6	[7]
3	(Netherlands) A Hartono (India) P Thombare	6	6
WC	(South Korea) B-y Jeong (South Korea) H-w Wi	3	2
(China) Y Ma (Canada) C Zhao	2	4
(Japan) M Kobori (Japan) A Shimizu	6	6
(China) X Gao (China) H Shi	4	6	[10]
(Japan) K Okamura (Serbia) N Stevanović	6	3	[2]
(Japan) S Ishii (Japan) N Sato	4	0
4	(China) S Feng (Japan) A Ito	6	6
(Chinese Taipei) I-h Cho (Chinese Taipei) Y-t Cho	7^{7}	6
WC	(South Korea) N-l Han (South Korea) Y-w Ku	6^{4}	3
WC	(South Korea) D-b Kim (South Korea) N-r Kim	3	0
2	(Chinese Taipei) E-s Liang (South Korea) S-h Park	6	6

Quarterfinals
1	(China) Q Tang (China) W Zheng	6	6
(South Korea) D-y Back (Japan) M Kawamura	2	3
3	(Netherlands) A Hartono (India) P Thombare	6	2	[11]
(Japan) M Kobori (Japan) A Shimizu	4	6	[9]
(China) X Gao (China) H Shi	6^{4}	2
4	(China) S Feng (Japan) A Ito	7^{7}	6
(Chinese Taipei) I-h Cho (Chinese Taipei) Y-t Cho	3	1
2	(Chinese Taipei) E-s Liang (South Korea) S-h Park	6	6

Semifinals
1	(China) Q Tang (China) W Zheng	6	6
3	(Netherlands) A Hartono (India) P Thombare	4	1
4	(China) S Feng (Japan) A Ito	1	7	[10]
2	(Chinese Taipei) E-s Liang (South Korea) S-h Park	6	5	[6]

Final
1	(China) Q Tang (China) W Zheng	6	6
4	(China) S Feng (Japan) A Ito	2	3
