= 2026 Korea Open – Singles =

Singles
- 2026 Korea Open

Final
- Champion: (Australia) Kimberly Birrell
- Runner-up: (Australia) Maya Joint
- Score: 6–4, 6–2
- Date: 27 September 2026

Details
- Draw: 32
- Seeds: 8

Events
Singles	Doubles
- Korea Open

Kimberly Birrell defeated Maya Joint in the final, 6–4, 6–2 to win the singles tennis title at the 2026 Korea Open. It was her first WTA Tour title. This was the first WTA Tour singles final contested by two Australians since the 2017 Internationaux de Strasbourg final between Samantha Stosur and Daria Saville.

Wildcards Back Da-yeon, Ku Yeon-woo and Park So-hyun became the first trio of South Koreans to reach the second round of the same WTA tournament for the first time since 1984.

Iga Świątek was the reigning champion, but did not participate this year.

== Seeds ==
1. (Latvia) Jeļena Ostapenko (second round)
2. (Australia) Kimberly Birrell (champion)
3. (Thailand) Lanlana Tararudee (quarterfinals)
4. (Romania) Elena-Gabriela Ruse (quarterfinals)
5. (Australia) Maya Joint (final)
6. (Hungary) Anna Bondár (semifinals)
7. (Poland) Magda Linette (first round)
8. (Uzbekistan) Kamilla Rakhimova (second round)

== Draw ==
Key

- Q = Qualifier
- WC = Wild card
- LL = Lucky loser
- Alt = Alternate
- ITF = ITF entry
- PR = Protected ranking
- SR = Special ranking
- SE = Special exempt
- JE = Junior exempt
- JR = Junior Accelerator Programme entrant
- CO = College Accelerator Programme entrant
- NG = Next Gen Accelerator Program entrant
- w/o = Walkover
- r = Retired
- d = Defaulted

=== Finals ===
Semifinals
Alina Korneeva	2	0^{r}
5	(Australia) Maya Joint	6	1
6	(Hungary) Anna Bondár	5	6	1
2	(Australia) Kimberly Birrell	7	2	6

Final
5	(Australia) Maya Joint	4	2
2	(Australia) Kimberly Birrell	6	6

=== Top half ===
First round
1/WC	(Latvia) J Ostapenko	6	6
A Zakharova	4	1
(Australia) T Preston	6	3	6
(Japan) H Sakatsume	2	6	2
A Korneeva	6	6
(Thailand) M Sawangkaew	4	2
Q	D Astakhova	3	6	7^{7}
7	(Poland) M Linette	6	1	6^{2}
3	(Thailand) L Tararudee	6	6^{5}	6
(Japan) M Uchijima	4	7^{7}	2
WC	(South Korea) S-h Park	7^{7}	6
(United States) R Montgomery	6^{4}	3
(China) Y Yuan	3	6	1
WC	(South Korea) D-y Back	6	4	6
Q	(China) X Yao	6	6^{7}	3
5	(Australia) M Joint	2	7^{9}	6

Second round
1/WC	(Latvia) J Ostapenko	4	1
(Australia) T Preston	6	6
A Korneeva	6	3	6
Q	D Astakhova	2	6	1
3	(Thailand) L Tararudee	7^{7}	6
WC	(South Korea) S-h Park	6^{5}	0
WC	(South Korea) D-y Back	2	1
5	(Australia) M Joint	6	6

Quarterfinals
(Australia) T Preston	1	4
A Korneeva	6	6
3	(Thailand) L Tararudee	4	3
5	(Australia) M Joint	6	6

Semifinals
A Korneeva	2	0^{r}
5	(Australia) M Joint	6	1

=== Bottom half ===
First round
6	(Hungary) A Bondár	2	6	6
(Mexico) R Zarazúa	6	3	1
(Armenia) A Charaeva	3	7^{7}	6
(United States) S Kenin	6	6^{4}	4
Q	A Ibragimova	3	2
WC	(South Korea) Y-w Ku	6	6
(Germany) E Lys	1	2
4	(Romania) E-G Ruse	6	6
8	(Uzbekistan) K Rakhimova	7^{7}	4	7
(Uzbekistan) P Kudermetova	6^{4}	6	5
(United States) K Volynets	6	6
(United States) E Kalieva	3	0
(Australia) E Jones	6	0	2
Q	(China) Y Ma	3	6	6
(Slovenia) T Zidanšek	6^{2}	4
2	(Australia) K Birrell	7^{7}	6

Second round
6	(Hungary) A Bondár	6	6^{6}	7^{7}
(Armenia) A Charaeva	4	7^{8}	6^{5}
WC	(South Korea) Y-w Ku	6	6^{1}	1
4	(Romania) E-G Ruse	2	7^{7}	6
8	(Uzbekistan) K Rakhimova	3	0
(United States) K Volynets	6	6
Q	(China) Y Ma	5	3
2	(Australia) K Birrell	7	6

Quarterfinals
6	(Hungary) A Bondár	6	1	6
4	(Romania) E-G Ruse	4	6	2
(United States) K Volynets	6	2	5
2	(Australia) K Birrell	2	6	7

Semifinals
6	(Hungary) A Bondár	5	6	1
2	(Australia) K Birrell	7	2	6

== Qualifying ==
=== Seeds ===
1. (Slovenia) Tamara Zidanšek (moved to main draw)
2. Alexandra Shubladze (qualifying competition)
3. Alevtina Ibragimova (qualified)
4. (Japan) Mai Hontama (first round)
5. (China) Ma Yexin (qualified)
6. Darya Astakhova (qualified)
7. (Australia) Priscilla Hon (first round)
8. (Japan) Sara Saito (qualifying competition)

=== Qualifiers ===
1. (China) Yao Xinxin
2. Darya Astakhova
3. Alevtina Ibragimova
4. (China) Ma Yexin

=== Qualifying draw ===
==== First qualifier ====
First round
Alt	(Japan) Miho Kuramochi	6	3	7^{7}
WC	(South Korea) Jeong Bo-young	4	6	6^{4}
(China) Yao Xinxin	6^{1}	7^{8}	7
7	(Australia) Priscilla Hon	7^{7}	6^{6}	5

Qualifying competition
Alt	(Japan) Miho Kuramochi	1	4
(China) Yao Xinxin	6	6

==== Second qualifier ====
First round
2	Alexandra Shubladze	6	6
WC	(South Korea) Jang Ga-eul	0	1
(Japan) Haruka Kaji	2	7^{8}	2
6	Darya Astakhova	6	6^{6}	6

Qualifying competition
2	Alexandra Shubladze	4	4
6	Darya Astakhova	6	6

==== Third qualifier ====
First round
3	Alevtina Ibragimova	6	6
(Japan) Rina Saigo	3	2
(Chinese Taipei) Liang En-shuo	6^{4}	1
8	(Japan) Sara Saito	7^{7}	6

Qualifying competition
3	Alevtina Ibragimova	7	6
8	(Japan) Sara Saito	5	2

==== Fourth qualifier ====
First round
4	(Japan) Mai Hontama	0	7	3
WC	(South Korea) Lee Eun-hye	6	5	6
(Canada) Carol Zhao	3	0
5	(China) Ma Yexin	6	6

Qualifying competition
WC	(South Korea) Lee Eun-hye	3	1
5	(China) Ma Yexin	6	6
