= 2024 Incheon Open =

Tennis tournament

- Date: 2–8 September 2024
- Edition: 19th
- Category: ITF Women's World Tennis Tour
- Prize money: $100,000
- Surface: Hard / Outdoor
- Location: Incheon, South Korea

Champions

Singles
- Tatiana Prozorova

Doubles
- (China) Tang Qianhui / (China) Zheng Wushuang
← 2023 ·	Incheon Open	· 2025 →

The 2024 Incheon Open was a professional tennis tournament played on outdoor hard courts. It was the nineteenth edition of the tournament, which was part of the 2024 ITF Women's World Tennis Tour. It took place in Incheon, South Korea, between 2 and 8 September 2024. This year the tournament's prize money was raised to $100,000.

== Champions ==
=== Singles ===
- Tatiana Prozorova def. (China) Gao Xinyu, 6–3, 6–0

=== Doubles ===
- (China) Tang Qianhui / (China) Zheng Wushuang def. (China) Feng Shuo / (Japan) Aoi Ito, 6–2, 6–3

== Singles main draw entrants ==
=== Seeds ===
Country	Player	Rank	Seed
JPN	Mai Hontama	108	1
NED	Arianne Hartono	148	2
AUS	Talia Gibson	170	3
THA	Mananchaya Sawangkaew	196	4
USA	Hanna Chang	200	5
THA	Lanlana Tararudee	201	6
CHN	Ma Yexin	223	7
JPN	Aoi Ito	230	8

- Rankings are as of 26 August 2024.

=== Other entrants ===
The following players received wildcards into the singles main draw:

- (South Korea) Ku Yeon-woo
- (South Korea) Lee Eun-hye
- (South Korea) Park So-hyun
- (South Korea) Park Ye-seo

The following player received entry into the singles main draw using a special ranking:

- (Indonesia) Priska Madelyn Nugroho

The following players received entry from the qualifying draw:

- (China) Feng Shuo
- (Japan) Ayumi Koshiishi
- (Thailand) Thasaporn Naklo
- Kira Pavlova
- Tatiana Prozorova
- Ekaterina Shalimova
- (China) Xun Fangying
- (Japan) Mei Yamaguchi
