= 2024 Incheon Open – Singles =

Singles
- 2024 Incheon Open

Final
- Champion: Tatiana Prozorova
- Runner-up: (China) Gao Xinyu
- Score: 6–3, 6–0

Events
Singles	Doubles
← 2023 ·	Incheon Open	· 2025 →

Cody Wong was the defending champion but chose not to participate.

Tatiana Prozorova won the title, defeating Gao Xinyu in the final, 6–3, 6–0.

== Seeds ==
1. (Japan) Mai Hontama (first round)
2. (Netherlands) Arianne Hartono (first round)
3. (Australia) Talia Gibson (first round)
4. (Thailand) Mananchaya Sawangkaew (first round)
5. (United States) Hanna Chang (first round)
6. (Thailand) Lanlana Tararudee (semifinals)
7. (China) Ma Yexin (first round)
8. (Japan) Aoi Ito (semifinals)

== Draw ==
=== Key ===
- Q = Qualifier
- WC = Wild card
- LL = Lucky loser
- Alt = Alternate
- ITF = ITF entry
- PR = Protected ranking
- SR = Special ranking
- SE = Special exempt
- JE = Junior exempt
- JR = Junior Accelerator Programme entrant
- CO = College Accelerator Programme entrant
- NG = Next Gen Accelerator Program entrant
- w/o = Walkover
- r = Retired
- d = Defaulted

=== Finals ===
Semifinals
6	(Thailand) Lanlana Tararudee	3	2
Q	Tatiana Prozorova	6	6
(China) Gao Xinyu	6	6
8	(Japan) Aoi Ito	4	4

Final
Q	Tatiana Prozorova	6	6
(China) Gao Xinyu	3	0

=== Top half ===
First round
1	(Japan) M Hontama	6	4	3
(Chinese Taipei) E-s Liang	1	6	6
WC	(South Korea) S-h Park	6	7
Q	(China) F Xun	2	5
WC	(South Korea) Y-s Park	2	2
(Japan) K Okamura	6	6
Q	E Shalimova	1^{r}
6	(Thailand) L Tararudee	4
4	(Thailand) M Sawangkaew	4	3
Q	T Prozorova	6	6
Q	(Japan) M Yamaguchi	6	6
(Serbia) N Stevanović	1	2
Q	(China) S Feng	1	6	0
(China) H Shi	6	0	6
(South Korea) D-y Back	6	6
7	(China) Y Ma	4	3

Second round
(Chinese Taipei) E-s Liang	6	5	6
WC	(South Korea) S-h Park	4	7	3
(Japan) K Okamura	5	6	2
6	(Thailand) L Tararudee	7	4	6
Q	T Prozorova	6	6
Q	(Japan) M Yamaguchi	4	3
(China) H Shi	1	4
(South Korea) D-y Back	6	6

Quarterfinals
(Chinese Taipei) E-s Liang	5	1
6	(Thailand) L Tararudee	7	6
Q	T Prozorova	6	6
(South Korea) D-y Back	3	3

Semifinals
6	(Thailand) L Tararudee	3	2
Q	T Prozorova	6	6

=== Bottom half ===
First round
5	(United States) H Chang	6	1	1
(Japan) S Ishii	3	6	6
WC	(South Korea) E-h Lee	2	5
(United States) H Inoue	6	7
(Canada) C Zhao	3	4
(Japan) H Kaji	6	6
(China) X Gao	6	6
3	(Australia) T Gibson	4	3
8	(Japan) A Ito	6	6
Q	(Thailand) T Naklo	1	1
WC	(South Korea) Y-w Ku	6	3	3
Q	K Pavlova	1	6	6
SR	(Indonesia) PM Nugroho	0	7^{7}	2
(Japan) A Shimizu	6	6^{5}	6
Q	(Japan) A Koshiishi	6	6
2	(Netherlands) A Hartono	2	3

Second round
(Japan) S Ishii	4	1
(United States) H Inoue	6	6
(Japan) H Kaji	1	4
(China) X Gao	6	6
8	(Japan) A Ito	6	6
Q	K Pavlova	4	3
(Japan) A Shimizu	2	1
Q	(Japan) A Koshiishi	6	6

Quarterfinals
(United States) H Inoue	1	3
(China) X Gao	6	6
8	(Japan) A Ito	6	1	6
(Japan) A Koshiishi	1	6	2

Semifinals
(China) X Gao	6	6
8	(Japan) A Ito	4	4
