= 2025 Incheon Open =

Tennis tournament

- Date: 22–28 September 2025
- Edition: 20th
- Category: ITF Women's World Tennis Tour
- Prize money: $100,000
- Surface: Hard / Outdoor
- Location: Incheon, South Korea

Champions

Singles
- (Japan) Nao Hibino

Doubles
- (Japan) Saki Imamura / (South Korea) Park So-hyun
← 2024 ·	Incheon Open	· 2026 →

The 2025 Incheon Open is a professional tennis tournament played on outdoor hard courts. It is the twentieth edition of the tournament, which is part of the 2025 ITF Women's World Tennis Tour. It takes place in Incheon, South Korea, between 22 and 28 September 2025.

== Champions ==
=== Singles ===
- (Japan) Nao Hibino def. (South Korea) Lee Eun-hye, 7–5, 7–6^{(7–2)}

=== Doubles ===
- (Japan) Saki Imamura / (South Korea) Park So-hyun def. (Japan) Hiroko Kuwata / (Indonesia) Priska Nugroho, 6–3, 4–6, [10–7]

== Singles main draw entrants ==
=== Seeds ===
Country	Player	Rank	Seed
JPN	Nao Hibino	201	1
USA	Hanna Chang	240	2
JPN	Sara Saito	255	3
JPN	Haruka Kaji	281	4
JPN	Sakura Hosogi	287	5
KOR	Park So-hyun	293	6
KOR	Ku Yeon-woo	305	7
KOR	Back Da-yeon	306	8

- Rankings are as of 15 September 2025.

=== Other entrants ===
The following players received wildcards into the singles main draw:

- (South Korea) Choi Seo-yun
- (South Korea) Jang Su-jeong
- (South Korea) Jeong Bo-young
- (South Korea) Kim Da-bin

The following player received entry into the singles main draw using a special ranking:

- (Chinese Taipei) Lee Ya-hsuan

The following players received entry from the qualifying draw:

- (South Korea) Choi On-yu
- (China) Dang Yiming
- (Japan) Natsumi Kawaguchi
- Jana Kolodynska
- (Japan) Misaki Matsuda
- Varvara Panshina
- (Thailand) Peangtarn Plipuech
- (United States) Amy Zhu

The following players received entry as lucky losers:

- (Japan) Chihiro Muramatsu
- (Thailand) Thasaporn Naklo
