= 2024 Korea Open – Singles =

Singles
- 2024 Korea Open

Final
- Champion: (Brazil) Beatriz Haddad Maia
- Runner-up: Daria Kasatkina
- Score: 1–6, 6–4, 6–1

Details
- Draw: 28
- Seeds: 8

Events
| Singles | Doubles |
| ← 2023 · | Korea Open | · 2025 → |

Beatriz Haddad Maia defeated Daria Kasatkina in the final, 1–6, 6–4, 6–1 to win the singles tennis title at the 2024 Korea Open. It was her fourth WTA Tour singles title.

Jessica Pegula was the reigning champion, but withdrew before the start of the tournament.

== Seeds ==
The top four seeds received a bye into the second round.

1. Daria Kasatkina (final)
2. Liudmila Samsonova (second round)
3. (Brazil) Beatriz Haddad Maia (champion)
4. Diana Shnaider (semifinals)
5. (Ukraine) Marta Kostyuk (quarterfinals)
6. (Kazakhstan) Yulia Putintseva (first round)
7. Ekaterina Alexandrova (second round)
8. (China) Yuan Yue (second round)

== Draw ==
=== Key ===
- Q = Qualifier
- WC = Wild card
- LL = Lucky loser
- Alt = Alternate
- ITF = ITF entry
- PR = Protected ranking
- SR = Special ranking
- SE = Special exempt
- JE = Junior exempt
- JR = Junior Accelerator Programme entrant
- CO = College Accelerator Programme entrant
- NG = Next Gen Accelerator Program entrant
- w/o = Walkover
- r = Retired
- d = Defaulted

=== Finals ===
Semifinals
1 | Daria Kasatkina | 6 | 6
4 | Diana Shnaider | 3 | 4
3 | (Brazil) Beatriz Haddad Maia | 6 | 6
Veronika Kudermetova | 4 | 4

Final
1 | Daria Kasatkina | 6 | 4 | 1
3 | (Brazil) Beatriz Haddad Maia | 1 | 6 | 6

=== Top half ===
First round
(United States) S Stephens | 6^{4} | 2
(United States) H Baptiste | 7^{7} | 6
(United States) P Stearns | 6^{4} | 6^{5}
(United Kingdom) E Raducanu | 7^{7} | 7^{7}
Q | (Romania) E-G Ruse | 6 | 2 | 2
8 | (China) Y Yuan | 4 | 6 | 6
WC | (South Korea) D-y Back | 4 | 1
Q | (Canada) C Zhao | 6 | 6
Q | (United Kingdom) H Watson | 6 | 6
Q | (China) Jia Lu | 4 | 4
(Netherlands) A Rus | 3 | 1
5 | (Ukraine) M Kostyuk | 6 | 6

Second round
1 | D Kasatkina | 6 | 6
(United States) H Baptiste | 4 | 2
(United Kingdom) E Raducanu | 6 | 6
8 | (China) Y Yuan | 4 | 3
4 | D Shnaider | 6 | 6
Q | (Canada) C Zhao | 3 | 3
Q | (United Kingdom) H Watson | 2 | 2
5 | (Ukraine) M Kostyuk | 6 | 6

Quarterfinals
1 | D Kasatkina | 6 | 0
(United Kingdom) E Raducanu | 1 | 0^{r}
4 | D Shnaider | 7^{9} | 6
5 | (Ukraine) M Kostyuk | 6^{7} | 3

Semifinals
1 | D Kasatkina | 6 | 6
4 | D Shnaider | 3 | 4

=== Bottom half ===
First round
7 | E Alexandrova | 7 | 3 | 6
Q | (United States) V Lepchenko | 5 | 6 | 0
LL | P Kudermetova | 7 | 6
Q | (Australia) P Hon | 5 | 4
PR | (Australia) A Tomljanović | 7^{7} | 4 | 6
WC | (South Korea) S-j Jang | 6^{4} | 6 | 3
6 | (Kazakhstan) Y Putintseva | 3 | 6^{5}
(United States) A Anisimova | 6 | 7^{7}
(Germany) T Maria | 2 | 6 | 0
(Bulgaria) V Tomova | 6 | 1 | 6
V Kudermetova | 6 | 6
PR | (China) S Zhang | 4 | 3

Second round
7 | E Alexandrova | 2 | 5
LL | P Kudermetova | 6 | 7
PR | (Australia) A Tomljanović | 3 | 4
3 | (Brazil) B Haddad Maia | 6 | 6
(United States) A Anisimova | 5 | 1^{r}
(Bulgaria) V Tomova | 7 | 4
V Kudermetova | 6 | 6
2 | L Samsonova | 4 | 2

Quarterfinals
LL | P Kudermetova | 2 | 1
3 | (Brazil) B Haddad Maia | 6 | 6
(Bulgaria) V Tomova | 5 | 3
V Kudermetova | 7 | 6

Semifinals
3 | (Brazil) B Haddad Maia | 6 | 6
V Kudermetova | 4 | 4

== Qualifying ==
=== Seeds ===
1. (Romania) Elena-Gabriela Ruse (qualified)
2. (Japan) Nao Hibino (first round, retired)
3. (United States) Varvara Lepchenko (qualified)
4. Polina Kudermetova (qualifying competition, lucky loser)
5. (United Kingdom) Heather Watson (qualified)
6. (United States) Hanna Chang (first round)
7. (Australia) Priscilla Hon (qualified)
8. (Canada) Carol Zhao (qualified)
9. (China) Lu Jiajing (qualified)
10. (Japan) Haruka Kaji (first round)
11. (Serbia) Natalija Stevanović (qualifying competition)
12. (Japan) Kyōka Okamura (qualifying competition)

=== Qualifiers ===
1. (Romania) Elena-Gabriela Ruse
2. (Australia) Priscilla Hon
3. (United States) Varvara Lepchenko
4. (China) Lu Jiajing
5. (United Kingdom) Heather Watson
6. (Canada) Carol Zhao

=== Lucky loser ===
1. Polina Kudermetova

=== Draw ===
==== First qualifier ====
First round
1 | (Romania) Elena-Gabriela Ruse | 6 | 6
(Japan) Eri Hozumi | 2 | 3
(Chinese Taipei) Chan Hao-ching | 1 | 1
12 | (Japan) Kyōka Okamura | 6 | 6

Qualifying competition
1 | (Romania) Elena-Gabriela Ruse | 6 | 2 | 6
12 | (Japan) Kyōka Okamura | 3 | 6 | 2

==== Second qualifier ====
First round
2 | (Japan) Nao Hibino | 6 | 3 | 2^{r}
WC | (South Korea) Lee Eun-hye | 3 | 6 | 3
(Norway) Ulrikke Eikeri | 4 | 3
7 | (Australia) Priscilla Hon | 6 | 6

Qualifying competition
WC | (South Korea) Lee Eun-hye | 1 | 4
7 | (Australia) Priscilla Hon | 6 | 6

==== Third qualifier ====
First round
3 | (United States) Varvara Lepchenko | 6 | 4 | 7
Kira Pavlova | 2 | 6 | 5
WC | (South Korea) Kim Yu-jin | 3 | 1
11 | (Serbia) Natalija Stevanović | 6 | 6

Qualifying competition
3 | (United States) Varvara Lepchenko | 6 | 6
11 | (Serbia) Natalija Stevanović | 2 | 3

==== Fourth qualifier ====
First round
4 | Polina Kudermetova | 1 | 6 | 6
(Japan) Mei Yamaguchi | 6 | 0 | 0
(Slovakia) Tereza Mihalíková | 2 | 2
9 | (China) Lu Jiajing | 6 | 6

Qualifying competition
4 | Polina Kudermetova | 4 | 4
9 | (China) Lu Jiajing | 6 | 6

==== Fifth qualifier ====
First round
5 | (United Kingdom) Heather Watson | 6 | 6
WC | (South Korea) Jeong Bo-young | 2 | 2
(South Korea) Ku Yeon-woo | 0 | 6 | 6
10 | (Japan) Haruka Kaji | 6 | 3 | 2

Qualifying competition
5 | (United Kingdom) Heather Watson | 7 | 6
(South Korea) Ku Yeon-woo | 5 | 3

==== Sixth qualifier ====
First round
6 | (United States) Hanna Chang | 3 | 3
(South Korea) Park So-hyun | 6 | 6
WC | (South Korea) Jang Ga-eul | 4 | 2
8 | (Canada) Carol Zhao | 6 | 6

Qualifying competition
(South Korea) Park So-hyun | 7^{7} | 4 | 1^{r}
8 | (Canada) Carol Zhao | 6^{3} | 6 | 4
