= 2024 Korea Open – Doubles =

Doubles
- 2024 Korea Open

Final
- Champions: (United States) Nicole Melichar-Martinez; Liudmila Samsonova
- Runners-up: (Japan) Miyu Kato (China) Zhang Shuai
- Score: 6–1, 6–0

Details
- Draw: 16
- Seeds: 4

Events
Singles	Doubles
← 2023 ·	Korea Open	· 2025 →

Nicole Melichar-Martinez and Liudmila Samsonova defeated Miyu Kato and Zhang Shuai in the final, 6–1, 6–0 to win the doubles tennis title at the 2024 Korea Open.

Marie Bouzková and Bethanie Mattek-Sands were the reigning champions, but Bouzková chose not to participate this year. Mattek-Sands partnered with Heather Watson, but they lost in the first round to Shuko Aoyama and Eri Hozumi.

== Seeds ==
1. (Chinese Taipei) Chan Hao-ching / Veronika Kudermetova (semifinals, withdrew)
2. (Mexico) Giuliana Olmos / Alexandra Panova (quarterfinals)
3. (Japan) Miyu Kato / (China) Zhang Shuai (final)
4. (United States) Bethanie Mattek-Sands / (United Kingdom) Heather Watson (first round)

== Draw ==
=== Key ===
- Q = Qualifier
- WC = Wild card
- LL = Lucky loser
- Alt = Alternate
- ITF = ITF entry
- PR = Protected ranking
- SR = Special ranking
- SE = Special exempt
- JE = Junior exempt
- JR = Junior Accelerator Programme entrant
- CO = College Accelerator Programme entrant
- NG = Next Gen Accelerator Program entrant
- w/o = Walkover
- r = Retired
- d = Defaulted

=== Draw ===
First round
1	(Chinese Taipei) H-c Chan; V Kudermetova	6	6
(Slovakia) T Mihalíková (United Kingdom) O Nicholls	4	2
(Japan) M Ninomiya (Bulgaria) V Tomova	4	6	[13]
Alt	(United States) V Lepchenko (Serbia) N Stevanović	6	4	[11]
3	(Japan) M Kato (China) S Zhang	1	6	[10]
(Norway) U Eikeri (Netherlands) A Rus	6	3	[6]
(Kazakhstan) Y Putintseva (Australia) A Tomljanović	4	2
(South Korea) S-j Jang (United States) S Stephens	6	6
(China) X Jiang (Chinese Taipei) F-h Wu	6	6
(Japan) N Hibino (Australia) P Hon	1	2
(Japan) S Aoyama (Japan) E Hozumi	6	4	[10]
4	(United States) B Mattek-Sands (United Kingdom) H Watson	0	6	[4]
(United States) N Melichar-Martinez; L Samsonova	7	6
WC	(South Korea) D-b Kim (South Korea) N-r Kim	5	4
E Alexandrova; Y Sizikova	6^{3}	2
2	(Mexico) G Olmos; A Panova	7^{7}	6

Quarterfinals
1	(Chinese Taipei) H-c Chan; V Kudermetova	5	6	[12]
(Japan) M Ninomiya (Bulgaria) V Tomova	7	3	[10]
3	(Japan) M Kato (China) S Zhang	6	6
(South Korea) S-j Jang (United States) S Stephens	4	4
(China) X Jiang (Chinese Taipei) F-h Wu	6	3	[10]
(Japan) S Aoyama (Japan) E Hozumi	3	6	[6]
(United States) N Melichar-Martinez; L Samsonova	6	5	[10]
2	(Mexico) G Olmos; A Panova	4	7	[2]

Semifinals
1	(Chinese Taipei) H-c Chan; V Kudermetova
3	(Japan) M Kato (China) S Zhang	w/o
(China) X Jiang (Chinese Taipei) F-h Wu	3	4
(United States) N Melichar-Martinez; L Samsonova	6	6

Final
3	(Japan) M Kato (China) S Zhang	1	0
(United States) N Melichar-Martinez; L Samsonova	6	6
