= David Kano =

David Kano may refer to:

- David Kano (Space: 1999), a character from the TV series Space: 1999
- David Kano (actor) (born 1987), American actor and writer
