= 2026 Korea Open – Doubles =

Doubles
- 2026 Korea Open

Final
- Champions: (Chinese Taipei) Chan Hao-ching (Chinese Taipei) Wu Fang-hsien
- Runners-up: (Chinese Taipei) Lee Ya-hsin (China) Ye Qiuyu
- Score: 6–2, 6–3
- Date: 27 September 2026

Details
- Draw: 16
- Seeds: 4

Events
Singles	Doubles
- Korea Open

Chan Hao-ching and Wu Fang-hsien defeated Lee Ya-hsin and Ye Qiuyu in the final, 6–2, 6–3 to win the doubles tennis title at the 2026 Korea Open.

Barbora Krejčíková and Kateřina Siniaková were the reigning champions, but Krejčiková chose to compete in Singapore and Siniaková chose to participate at the Billie Jean King Cup finals instead.

== Seeds ==
1. (Chinese Taipei) Chan Hao-ching / (Chinese Taipei) Wu Fang-hsien (champions)
2. (Australia) Maya Joint / (Romania) Elena-Gabriela Ruse (quarterfinals)
3. (Czech Republic) Anastasia Dețiuc / Irina Khromacheva (quarterfinals)
4. (Hong Kong) Eudice Chong / (Japan) Eri Hozumi (semifinals)

== Draw ==
Key

- Q = Qualifier
- WC = Wild card
- LL = Lucky loser
- Alt = Alternate
- ITF = ITF entry
- PR = Protected ranking
- SR = Special ranking
- SE = Special exempt
- JE = Junior exempt
- JR = Junior Accelerator Programme entrant
- CO = College Accelerator Programme entrant
- NG = Next Gen Accelerator Program entrant
- w/o = Walkover
- r = Retired
- d = Defaulted

=== Draw ===
First round
1	(Chinese Taipei) H-c Chan (Chinese Taipei) F-h Wu	7	6
(Armenia) A Charaeva (Uzbekistan) K Rakhimova	5	1
WC	(South Korea) D-y Back (South Korea) S-j Jang	6	7^{10}
(Thailand) P Plipuech (Belgium) K Zimmermann	2	6^{8}
3	(Czech Republic) A Dețiuc; I Khromacheva	4	6	[10]
(Australia) T Preston (Thailand) L Tararudee	6	4	[4]
(Chinese Taipei) I-h Cho (Chinese Taipei) Y-t Cho	4	6	[8]
(Chinese Taipei) E-s Liang (China) Y Yuan	6	3	[10]
(Brazil) I Martins (Mexico) R Zarazúa	6	6
(Australia) P Hon (Australia) A Osborne	4	4
(Japan) M Kobori (Japan) A Shimizu	2	6	[7]
4	(Hong Kong) E Chong (Japan) E Hozumi	6	2	[10]
WC	(South Korea) E-h Lee (South Korea) S-h Park	3	5
(Chinese Taipei) Y-h Lee (China) Q Ye	6	7
(Hungary) A Bondár (Hungary) F Stollár	1	6^{2}
2	(Australia) M Joint (Romania) E-G Ruse	6	7^{7}

Quarterfinals
1	(Chinese Taipei) H-c Chan (Chinese Taipei) F-h Wu	6	6
WC	(South Korea) D-y Back (South Korea) S-j Jang	1	2
3	(Czech Republic) A Dețiuc; I Khromacheva	4	4
(Chinese Taipei) E-s Liang (China) Y Yuan	6	6
(Brazil) I Martins (Mexico) R Zarazúa	3	3
4	(Hong Kong) E Chong (Japan) E Hozumi	6	6
(Chinese Taipei) Y-h Lee (China) Q Ye	1	6	[14]
2	(Australia) M Joint (Romania) E-G Ruse	6	3	[12]

Semifinals
1	(Chinese Taipei) H-c Chan (Chinese Taipei) F-h Wu	6	7
(Chinese Taipei) E-s Liang (China) Y Yuan	4	5
4	(Hong Kong) E Chong (Japan) E Hozumi	4	3
(Chinese Taipei) Y-h Lee (China) Q Ye	6	6

Final
1	(Chinese Taipei) H-c Chan (Chinese Taipei) F-h Wu	6	6
(Chinese Taipei) Y-h Lee (China) Q Ye	2	3
