= Kano =

Kano may refer to:

== Places ==
- Kano State, a state in Northern Nigeria
- Kano (city), a city in Nigeria, and the capital of Kano State
- Kingdom of Kano, a Hausa kingdom between the 10th and 19th centuries
- Kano Emirate, a 19th-century Islamic state
- Kano Emirate Council, a non-sovereign monarchy in Nigeria
- Kano River, a river in Japan

== People ==
=== Given name ===
- Kano Fujihira (藤平 華乃; born 2004), Japanese entertainer
- Kano Ikeda (1887–1960), Japanese American professor
- Kano Omata (小俣 夏乃; born 1996), Japanese competitor in synchronized swimming

=== Mononym ===
- Kano (British musician) (born 1985), British rapper
- Kano (comics) (born 1973), Spanish comic book artist
- Kano (Japanese musician), Japanese musician and virtual YouTuber

=== Surname ===
- Kanō Jigorō (嘉納 治五郎; 1860–1938), Japanese founder of Judo
- Aminu Kano (1920–1983), Nigerian politician
- David Kano (actor) (born 1987), American actor, writer and producer
- Eiko Kano (狩野 英孝; born 1982), Japanese comedian and singer
- Kano sisters, Kyoko Kano (叶 恭子; born 1962) and Mika Kano (叶 美香; born 1967), Japanese celebrities
- Michihiko Kano (鹿野 道彦; 1942–2021), Japanese politician
- Miyuki Kano (狩野 美雪; born 1977), Japanese volleyball player
- Noriaki Kano (狩野 紀昭; born 1940), Japanese developer of the Kano model
- Thea Kano (born 1965), American conductor
- Tokio Kano (加納 時男; 1935–2017), Japanese politician

== Fictional characters ==
- Kano (Mortal Kombat), a fighter from the Mortal Kombat franchise
- Kano Kirishima, from the visual novel Air.
- Kano, the leader of "Bad Company", a 2000AD comic strip
- David Kano, from Space: 1999

== Other uses ==
- Kano (band), an early-1980s Italian dance music group
- Kano (film), a 2014 Taiwanese baseball film directed by Umin Boya
- KANO (FM), a radio station (89.1 FM) in Hilo, Hawaii
- Kano baseball team, a defunct Taiwanese baseball team
- Kano Chronicle, an account of the history of the Hausa people
- Kano Computing, a British computer hardware and software company
- Kano model, a theory of new product development and customer satisfaction
- Kanō school, a school of Japanese painting
- Kano, an arcade game by Glitchers
- Rondo, a variety of the Dutch pastry gevulde koek

== See also ==
- Kanoo, an Arabic family name
