= 2024 Korea Open (tennis) =

- Date: 16–22 September 2024
- Edition: 20th
- Category: WTA 500
- Draw: 28S / 16D
- Prize money: $922,573
- Surface: Hard, outdoor
- Location: Seoul, South Korea
- Venue: Seoul Olympic Park Tennis Center

Champions

Singles
- (Brazil) Beatriz Haddad Maia

Doubles
- (United States) Nicole Melichar-Martinez / Liudmila Samsonova
- Korea Open (tennis)

The 2024 Hana Bank Korea Open was a women's tennis tournament played on outdoor hardcourts. It was the 20th edition of the tournament and a WTA 500 event on the 2024 WTA Tour (upgraded from WTA 250 status in previous years). The tournament took place at the Olympic Park Tennis Center in Seoul, South Korea from 16 September until 22 September 2024. Third-seeded Beatriz Haddad Maia won the singles title.

== Finals ==
=== Singles ===
- (Brazil) Beatriz Haddad Maia defeated Daria Kasatkina 1–6, 6–4, 6–1

=== Doubles ===
- (United States) Nicole Melichar-Martinez / Liudmila Samsonova defeated (Japan) Miyu Kato / (China) Zhang Shuai 6–1, 6–0

== Singles main draw entrants ==
=== Seeds ===
Country	Player	Rank	Seeds
	Daria Kasatkina	13	1
	Liudmila Samsonova	15	2
BRA	Beatriz Haddad Maia	16	3
	Diana Shnaider	17	4
UKR	Marta Kostyuk	18	5
KAZ	Yulia Putintseva	29	6
	Ekaterina Alexandrova	31	7
CHN	Yuan Yue	38	8

- Rankings are as of 9 September 2024.

=== Other entrants ===
The following players received wildcards into the singles main draw:

- (South Korea) Back Da-yeon
- (South Korea) Jang Su-jeong

The following players received entry using a protected ranking:

- (Australia) Ajla Tomljanović
- (China) Zhang Shuai

The following players received entry from the qualifying draw:

- (Australia) Priscilla Hon
- (United States) Varvara Lepchenko
- (China) Lu Jiajing
- (Romania) Elena-Gabriela Ruse
- (United Kingdom) Heather Watson
- (Canada) Carol Zhao

The following player received entry as a lucky loser:

- Polina Kudermetova

=== Withdrawals ===
- (United Kingdom) Katie Boulter → replaced by Polina Kudermetova (Note: Originally replaced by Magdalena Fręch but she withdrew after winning the title at Guadalajara.)
- (United States) Emma Navarro → replaced by (Bulgaria) Viktoriya Tomova
- (United States) Jessica Pegula → replaced by (United States) Amanda Anisimova
- (Czech Republic) Karolína Plíšková → replaced by (United States) Sloane Stephens
- Anastasia Potapova → replaced by (United States) Peyton Stearns
- (Poland) Iga Świątek → replaced by (United Kingdom) Emma Raducanu
- (Kazakhstan) Elena Rybakina → replaced by (China) Zhang Shuai

== Doubles main draw entrants ==
=== Seeds ===
Country	Player	Country	Player	Rank^{1}	Seed
TPE	Chan Hao-ching		Veronika Kudermetova	45	1
MEX	Giuliana Olmos		Alexandra Panova	67	2
JPN	Miyu Kato	CHN	Zhang Shuai	74	3
USA	Bethanie Mattek-Sands	GBR	Heather Watson	79	4

- ^{1} Rankings as of 9 September 2024

=== Other entrants ===
The following pair received a wildcard into the doubles main draw:

- (South Korea) Kim Da-bin / (South Korea) Kim Na-ri

The following pair received entry as alternates:

- (United States) Varvara Lepchenko / (Serbia) Natalija Stevanović

=== Withdrawals ===
- (Ukraine) Marta Kostyuk / (Romania) Elena-Gabriela Ruse replaced by → (United States) Varvara Lepchenko / (Serbia) Natalija Stevanović
