= 2025 Korea Open (tennis) =

- Date: 15–21 September 2025
- Edition: 21st
- Category: WTA 500
- Draw: 28S / 16D
- Prize money: $1,064,510
- Surface: Hard, outdoor
- Location: Seoul, South Korea
- Venue: Seoul Olympic Park Tennis Center

Champions

Singles
- (Poland) Iga Świątek

Doubles
- (Czech Republic) Barbora Krejčíková / (Czech Republic) Kateřina Siniaková
- Korea Open (tennis)

The 2025 Korea Open Tennis Championships presented by Motiva was a tennis tournament played on outdoor hardcourts. It was the 21st edition of the tournament and a WTA 500 event on the 2025 WTA Tour. The tournament took place at the Olympic Park Tennis Center in Seoul, South Korea from 15 to 21 September 2025.

== Champions ==
=== Singles ===
- (Poland) Iga Świątek def. Ekaterina Alexandrova, 1–6, 7–6^{(7–3)}, 7–5

=== Doubles ===
- (Czech Republic) Barbora Krejčíková / (Czech Republic) Kateřina Siniaková def. (Australia) Maya Joint / (United States) Caty McNally 6–3, 7–6^{(8–6)}

== Singles main draw entrants ==
=== Seeds ===
Country	Player	Rank	Seeds
POL	Iga Świątek	2	1
	Ekaterina Alexandrova	11	2
DEN	Clara Tauson	12	3
AUS	Daria Kasatkina	16	4
	Diana Shnaider	19	5
BRA	Beatriz Haddad Maia	27	6
USA	Sofia Kenin	31	7
GBR	Emma Raducanu	34	8

- Rankings are as of 8 September 2025.

=== Other entrants ===
The following players received wildcards into the singles main draw:

- (South Korea) Back Da-yeon
- (South Korea) Ku Yeon-woo
- (South Korea) Park So-hyun
- (United Kingdom) Emma Raducanu

The following players received entry using a protected ranking:

- (Romania) Sorana Cîrstea
- ~~(China) Zhu Lin~~

The following players received entry from the qualifying draw:

- (Czech Republic) Linda Fruhvirtová
- (United States) Caty McNally
- (France) Jessika Ponchet
- Tatiana Prozorova
- (Germany) Ella Seidel
- (Czech Republic) Kateřina Siniaková

The following player received entry as a lucky loser:

- Anastasia Zakharova

=== Withdrawals ===
- (United States) Amanda Anisimova → replaced by (Germany) Laura Siegemund
- (United States) McCartney Kessler → replaced by (Germany) Eva Lys
- Veronika Kudermetova → replaced by (Netherlands) Suzan Lamens
- Anastasia Potapova → replaced by Anastasia Zakharova

== Doubles main draw entrants ==
=== Seeds ===
Country	Player	Country	Player	Rank^{1}	Seed
AUS	Ellen Perez	HUN	Fanny Stollár	57	1
~~BRA~~	~~Beatriz Haddad Maia~~	~~GER~~	~~Laura Siegemund~~	~~58~~	~~2~~
SVK	Tereza Mihalíková	GBR	Olivia Nicholls	66	3
JPN	Miyu Kato	TPE	Wu Fang-hsien	72	4

- ^{1} Rankings as of 8 September 2025

=== Other entrants ===
The following pair received a wildcard into the doubles main draw:

- (South Korea) Back Da-yeon / (South Korea) Lee Eun-hye

=== Withdrawals ===
- (Brazil) Beatriz Haddad Maia / (Germany) Laura Siegemund → no replacement
