= 2026 Korea Open =

Women's tennis tournament in South Korea

- Date: 21–27 September 2026
- Edition: 22nd
- Category: WTA 250
- Draw: 32S / 16D
- Prize money: $283,347
- Surface: Hard, outdoor
- Location: Seoul, South Korea
- Venue: Seoul Olympic Park Tennis Center

Champions

Singles
- (Australia) Kimberly Birrell

Doubles
- (Chinese Taipei) Chan Hao-ching / (Chinese Taipei) Wu Fang-hsien
- Korea Open (tennis)

The 2026 Korea Open was a professional women's tennis tournament played on outdoor hardcourts. It was the 22nd edition of the tournament and a WTA 250 event on the 2026 WTA Tour. The tournament took place at the Olympic Park Tennis Center in Seoul, South Korea from 21 to 27 September 2026. The event was downgraded this year from WTA 500 status for the previous two editions.

== Champions ==
=== Singles ===
- (Australia) Kimberly Birrell def. (Australia) Maya Joint, 6–4, 6–2

=== Doubles ===
- (Chinese Taipei) Chan Hao-ching / (Chinese Taipei) Wu Fang-hsien def. (Chinese Taipei) Lee Ya-hsin / (China) Ye Qiuyu, 6–2, 6–3

== Singles main draw entrants ==
=== Seeds ===
Country	Player	Rank	Seeds
LAT	Jeļena Ostapenko	32	1
AUS	Kimberly Birrell	56	2
THA	Lanlana Tararudee	61	3
ROU	Elena-Gabriela Ruse	65	4
AUS	Maya Joint	68	5
HUN	Anna Bondár	69	6
POL	Magda Linette	74	7
UZB	Kamilla Rakhimova	76	8

- Rankings are as of 14 September 2026.

=== Other entrants ===
The following players received wildcards into the singles main draw:

- (South Korea) Back Da-yeon
- (South Korea) Ku Yeon-woo
- (Latvia) Jeļena Ostapenko
- (South Korea) Park So-hyun

The following players received entry from the qualifying draw:

- Darya Astakhova
- Alevtina Ibragimova
- (China) Ma Yexin
- (China) Yao Xinxin

=== Withdrawals ===
- (Czech Republic) Nikola Bartůňková → replaced by Anastasia Zakharova
- (United States) McCartney Kessler → replaced by (Australia) Emerson Jones
- (United States) Ashlyn Krueger → replaced by (United States) Sofia Kenin
- (Croatia) Petra Marčinko → replaced by (China) Yuan Yue
- Liudmila Samsonova → replaced by (Slovenia) Tamara Zidanšek
- (Ukraine) Yuliia Starodubtseva → replaced by (Armenia) Alina Charaeva
- (Czech Republic) Tereza Valentová → replaced by (United States) Robin Montgomery
- (Czech Republic) Darja Vidmanova → replaced by (United States) Elvina Kalieva

== Doubles main draw entrants ==
=== Seeds ===
Country	Player	Country	Player	Rank^{1}	Seed
TPE	Chan Hao-ching	TPE	Wu Fang-hsien	101	1
AUS	Maya Joint	ROU	Elena-Gabriela Ruse	113	2
CZE	Anastasia Dețiuc		Irina Khromacheva	121	3
HKG	Eudice Chong	JPN	Eri Hozumi	121	4

- ^{1} Rankings as of 14 September 2026

=== Other entrants ===
The following pairs received wildcards into the doubles main draw:

- (South Korea) Back Da-yeon / (South Korea) Jang Su-jeong
- (South Korea) Lee Eun-hye / (South Korea) Park So-hyun
