= Yusuf bin Ahmed Kanoo =

Bahraini merchant and trader

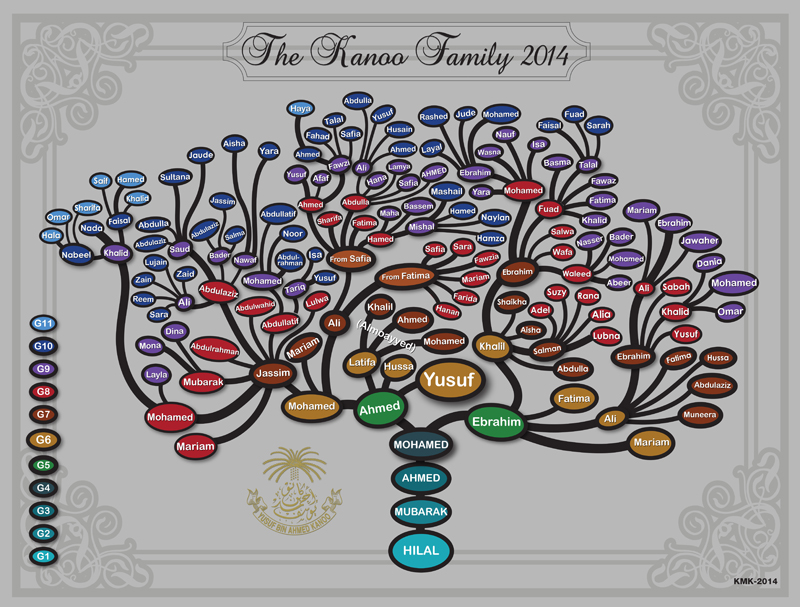
The Kanoo family tree

Yusuf bin Ahmed Kanoo, also known as Haji Yusuf, was a Bahraini merchant and trader who, in 1890, took over his father's business and started the trading empire that would grow into the Yusuf bin Ahmed Kanoo Group, one of the largest independent trading companies in the Gulf region.

Kanoo introduced a number of innovations to Bahrain, including setting up the country's first bank and its first petrol station. He built a significant regional business in shipping and trading agencies, which brought him into conflict with British companies and authority, before seeing much of his holdings wiped out by the financial crisis that followed in the wake of the collapse of the pearling industry in the Persian Gulf.

== Early life ==
Yusuf bin Ahmed Kanoo was born in Bahrain in 1868, growing up in Manama, the lively trading centre of the small island nation. From an early age, he worked in his father Ahmed bin Mohamed Kanoo's business, a small foodstuffs trading company. Taking over the business from his father in 1890, at the age of 22, Yusuf bin Ahmed chartered boats to import commodities directly from Kerala and Mombasa, expanding his links to the whole Indian coast and also other ports in East Africa. From this point and for the rest of his life, Kanoo would make annual trading voyages to India for four to six months.

Recognising the importance of links with the British, and particularly the dominance of the British steamship companies (and their representatives, Gray Paul and Gray Mackenzie), Kanoo took an unpaid post in 1898 with the first British Resident Agent in Bahrain, Ahmed bin Abdul Rasool, in order to learn English and familiarise himself with the British. In 1900, the first British resident Assistant Political Agent in Bahrain, J. Calcott Gaskin, was appointed and Kanoo acted as an interpreter for Gaskin with the Ruler of Bahrain, Sheikh Isa bin Ali Al Khalifa. Gaskin was replaced in 1904 by FB Prideaux and the post was upgraded to become the Persian Gulf Residency.

== Agencies ==
As Bahrain's entrepot trade expanded, Kanoo built his trading activities, including involvement in the mother of pearl trade. As well as an increasingly wide network of general trade throughout Saudi Arabia, Kuwait, Qatar and Sharjah, he secured an agency to ship large bulk cargoes of coffee and tea, breaking these down into smaller consignments for regional distribution. In 1911, he secured the Bahrain agency for Arab Steamers Ltd, a Bombay-based company that ran a regular service between Bombay and Basra with its single ship, the SS Budrie. Arab Steamers expanded its fleet to offer a weekly service that would rival the dominant force at the time, the British India Steam Navigation Company.

Arab Steamers expanded its fleet to five ships, diverting them to Bahrain from the Bombay/Basra run on an opportunistic basis, later operating scheduled services. The company provided their agent, Kanoo, with a typewriter to simplify correspondence – the first typewriter, as it turned out, to be used in Bahrain.

In 1913, Kanoo signed an agency agreement with APOC (the Anglo Persian Oil Company), which established him as the agent for the Mahadi Namazi Line. He also became the agent for the Mogul Line, which later amalgamated with the Mahadi Namazi Line, a shipping company that specialised in the transportation to and from Jeddah of pilgrims to Mecca. By the First World War, Kanoo was operating a significant portfolio of shipping agencies, including the Bombay and Persia Steam Navigation Company of Bombay and the Persian Gulf Steam Navigation Company of London – in fact representing two competitors. Eventually Kanoo was forced to cede the smaller of the two agencies and drop the Persian Gulf Steam Navigation Company agency. His APOC agency was to become a lucrative one when Imperial Airways started regular flights through Bahrain as part of its Empire Route, connecting Croydon with Canberra.

== Banking ==
Kanoo also installed the first bank vault in Bahrain in 1913, a walk-in strong room acquired from British manufacturer Goodridge (the safe itself is on display today at the Bahrain Heritage Centre). This safe underpinned a number of banking services offered by Kanoo to local merchants, including Islamic finance and money transfers between Bahrain and Bombay. The existence of this banking system was part of the reason local merchants and traders in Manama resisted the establishment of the British-owned Eastern Bank in Bahrain, leading to a two-year stand-off with British authorities from the bank's first application to trade in 1916. Kanoo eventually agreed to drop his resistance to the establishment of the British bank, which opened in 1918, but quietly continued to provide financial services to the local trading community.

By this time, Kanoo had established agencies for the Kerr Steamship Company and also Studebaker and Ford. He also set up the first petrol pump in Bahrain, in 1929.

== Relationship with the British ==
Although awarded the Kaiser-i-Hind Medal of the Second Class by the British in 1912 (on King George V's birthday), as Honorary Munshi to the Agency, Kanoo's relationships with the British were not always smooth. D. L. R. Lorimer, the political agent of the time, noted that Kanoo had "declined to give assistance" and was "believed to be in the Arab camp". By 1917, his status had been upgraded by the British to Khan Sahib before, on 3 June 1919, being awarded a Member of the Order of the British Empire (MBE). Despite this, his relationship with H. R. P. Dickson, who took over as Political Resident on 6 November 1919, was fraught with conflict – as was that with Dickson's successor, C. K. Daly. Although Dickson was removed on petition of the Ruler of Bahrain and Daly removed following an assassination attempt, the damage in the relationship between Kanoo and the British was done.

The rift wasn't complete however; in 1923 Kanoo was awarded the Companion of the Order of the Indian Empire (CIE), conferred by King George V, and in October 1925 Kanoo sailed to Sharjah on HMS Cyclamen in support of Stuart Horner, secretary to the Political Resident, who was investigating charges of murder against the rebellious Sheikh Abdulrahman bin Muhammad Al Shamsi. Kanoo was, however, Horner noted, 'of very little actual assistance'.

== Decline ==
By 1930, the long decline of the pearl markets of the Persian Gulf had forced many pearl divers, captains, traders and other businessmen into penury. Kanoo applied for a loan of 20,000 Rupees from the Ruler of Bahrain, which was approved but then foundered on British opposition. Kanoo was forced to take a commercial loan at heavy rates of interest and sell off parts of his business. The loan was provided by his old rival, the Eastern Bank. The affair damaged both his business and his health, dragging on into the Second World War and miring the family in debt.

Kanoo was childless himself, but adopted the two sons and daughter of his brother, Mohamed when he died of plague at the age of 25 in the outbreaks of disease that swept Bahrain and the Trucial Coast in 1903 and 1904. Jassim and Ali, the boys, would go on to become partners in the family business. The girl was named Mariam.

Although he had managed to repay most of his debts by the time of his death on 21 December 1945, Haji Yusuf bin Ahmed Kanoo died leaving his two adopted sons just 10,000 Rupees with which to rebuild the family's fortunes. However, he also left them with a considerable collection of lucrative businesses and agencies and they formed a successful partnership that was to evolve into a major conglomerate with operations in Bahrain, Saudi Arabia, the UAE and the UK.
