= Incheon Open =

- 2025 Incheon Open

ITF Women's Tour
- Event name: Incheon Open
- Location: Incheon, South Korea
- Venue: Yeorumul Tennis Court
- Category: ITF Women's World Tennis Tour
- Surface: Hard
- Draw: 32S/32Q/16D
- Prize money: $100,000

The Incheon Open is a tournament for professional female tennis players played on outdoor hard courts. The event is classified as a $100,000 ITF Women's World Tennis Tour tournament and has been held in Incheon, South Korea, since 2004.

== Past finals ==
=== Singles ===
Year	Champion	Runner-up	Score
2025	(Japan) Nao Hibino	(South Korea) Lee Eun-hye	7–5, 7–6^{(7–2)}
2024	Tatiana Prozorova	(China) Gao Xinyu	6–3, 6–0
2023	(Hong Kong) Cody Wong	(China) Jiang Xinyu	1–6, 6–3, 3–0, ret.
2022	(Canada) Carol Zhao	(Japan) Mayuka Aikawa	6–4, 6–1
2020–21	Tournament cancelled due to the COVID-19 pandemic		
2019	(South Korea) Han Na-lae	(Russia) Anastasia Gasanova	6–3, 6–0
2018	(Chinese Taipei) Liang En-shuo	(South Korea) Han Na-lae	6–2, 0–6, 7–5
2017	(South Korea) Han Na-lae	(Thailand) Luksika Kumkhum	7–6^{(7–2)}, 7–5
2016	(South Korea) Jeong Su-nam	(South Korea) Han Na-lae	6–4, 4–6, 6–4
2015	(Japan) Risa Ozaki	(China) Liu Chang	5–7, 7–6^{(7–4)}, 6–3
2014	(Sweden) Susanne Celik	(China) Han Xinyun	4–6, 6–3, 6–4
2013	(Japan) Erika Sema	(Japan) Yurika Sema	6–3, 6–4
2012	(Chinese Taipei) Chan Chin-wei	(Hong Kong) Zhang Ling	3–6, 6–2, 6–1
2011	(South Korea) Kim So-jung	(South Korea) Lee Jin-a	2–6, 6–3, 6–1
2010	(South Korea) Lee Jin-a	(Romania) Irina-Camelia Begu	6–4, 6–2
2009	(China) Han Xinyun	(China) Liang Chen	6–2, 6–2
2008	(Chinese Taipei) Hsieh Su-wei	(China) Xie Yanze	6–1, 6–1
2007	(Russia) Regina Kulikova	(South Korea) Lee Ye-ra	6–3, 2–6, 6–3
2006	(Chinese Taipei) Chan Chin-wei	(Chinese Taipei) Hwang I-hsuan	6–1, 6–4
2005	(Chinese Taipei) Hsieh Su-wei	(South Korea) Yoo Mi	6–1, 6–2
2004	(Chinese Taipei) Chuang Chia-jung	(South Korea) Lee Eun-jeong	6–3, 6–2

=== Doubles ===
Year	Champions	Runners-up	Score
2025	(Japan) Saki Imamura (South Korea) Park So-hyun	(Japan) Hiroko Kuwata (Indonesia) Priska Nugroho	6–3, 4–6, [10–7]
2024	(China) Tang Qianhui (China) Zheng Wushuang	(China) Feng Shuo (Japan) Aoi Ito	6–2, 6–3
2023	(South Korea) Choi Ji-hee (South Korea) Ku Yeon-woo	(Chinese Taipei) Li Yu-yun (China) Tang Qianhui	6–1, 6–1
2022	(South Korea) Choi Ji-hee (South Korea) Han Na-lae	(Chinese Taipei) Lee Ya-hsuan (Chinese Taipei) Wu Fang-hsien	5–7, 6–4, [10–6]
2020–21	Tournament cancelled due to the COVID-19 pandemic		
2019	(South Korea) Choi Ji-hee (South Korea) Han Na-lae	(Japan) Kanako Morisaki (Japan) Minori Yonehara	6–3, 6–3
2018	(South Korea) Han Na-lae (South Korea) Kim Na-ri	(Chinese Taipei) Chang Kai-chen (Chinese Taipei) Hsu Ching-wen	5–0, ret.
2017	(United States) Desirae Krawczyk (Mexico) Giuliana Olmos	(South Korea) Choi Ji-hee (South Korea) Kim Na-ri	6–3, 2–6, [10–8]
2016	(South Korea) Han Sung-hee (Japan) Makoto Ninomiya	(Thailand) Kamonwan Buayam (Chinese Taipei) Lee Pei-chi	6–3, 6–1
2015	(Japan) Miyu Kato (Japan) Kotomi Takahata	(South Korea) Choi Ji-hee (South Korea) Kim Na-ri	4–6, 6–3, [10–7]
2014	(South Korea) Han Na-lae (South Korea) Yoo Mi	(Thailand) Noppawan Lertcheewakarn (Turkey) Melis Sezer	6–1, 6–1
2013	(Japan) Miki Miyamura (Japan) Akiko Omae	(Thailand) Nicha Lertpitaksinchai (Thailand) Peangtarn Plipuech	6–4, 6–7^{(6–8)}, [11–9]
2012	(China) Liang Chen (China) Sun Shengnan	(South Korea) Kim Ji-young (South Korea) Yoo Mi	6–3, 6–2
2011	(South Korea) Han Sung-hee (South Korea) Hong Hyun-hui	(Chinese Taipei) Kao Shao-yuan (Thailand) Varatchaya Wongteanchai	6–3, 7–6^{(7–3)}
2010	(Romania) Irina-Camelia Begu (Japan) Erika Sema	(Japan) Misaki Doi (Japan) Junri Namigata	6–0, 7–6^{(10–8)}
2009	(China) Lu Jingjing (China) Sun Shengnan	(China) Han Xinyun (China) Ji Chunmei	6–3, 6–3
2008	(Chinese Taipei) Chan Chin-wei (Slovakia) Jarmila Gajdošová	(South Korea) Chang Kyung-mi (South Korea) Lee Jin-a	1–6, 6–1, [10–5]
2007	(Ukraine) Tetiana Luzhanska (Indonesia) Romana Tedjakusuma	(South Korea) Lee Jin-a (South Korea) Yoo Mi	6–1, 6–4
2006	(Chinese Taipei) Chuang Chia-jung (Thailand) Napaporn Tongsalee	(South Korea) Lee Jin-a (South Korea) Yoo Mi	6–2, 6–4
2005	(Chinese Taipei) Chan Chin-wei (Chinese Taipei) Hsieh Su-wei	(South Korea) Choi Jin-young (South Korea) Lee Ye-ra	6–2, 7–6^{(7–4)}
2004	(Chinese Taipei) Chan Chin-wei (Chinese Taipei) Hsieh Su-wei	(South Korea) Choi Jin-young (South Korea) Kim Mi-ok	6–2, 6–0
