= Yusuf Bin Ahmed Kanoo Group =

Business conglomerate

Yusuf Bin Ahmed Kanoo Group يوسف بن أحمد كانو
- Type: Private
- Founded: 1890; 136 years ago
- Headquarters: Manama, Bahrain,
- Key people: Khalid Mohammed Kanoo (Group Chairman); Fawzi Ahmed Kanoo (Deputy Chairman); Maarten Geeraerts (Group Chief Executive Officer)
- Divisions: Kanoo Capital, Industrial & Energy, Kanoo Travel, Shipping & Logistics, and Real Estate
- Website: http://www.kanoo.com

The Yusuf Bin Ahmed Kanoo Group (also known as: YBA Kanoo Group) is a privately held business conglomerate established in 1890. It is one of the largest family-owned multinationals in the Middle East, with complementary businesses and strategic partnerships. It has a physical presence across the Middle East, North Africa, Europe and Asia, and a 4,000-strong workforce, covering a broad range of sectors. Its business groups include: Kanoo Capital, Industrial & Energy, Travel, Shipping & Logistics and Real Estate.

== History ==
Established in the Kingdom of Bahrain in 1890 by Haji Yusuf bin Ahmed Kanoo as a small family trading and shipping business, the YBA Kanoo Group evolved into a diversified conglomerate that provides a broad range of products and services. YBA Kanoo has wholly owned activities across the Persian Gulf, in Bahrain, Saudi Arabia, UAE (as The Kanoo Group), Oman, and Qatar, and expanding beyond the region to cover Egypt, South Africa, UK, France and India. It is a trusted trading name in the region, and cited by Bahrain's King Hamad bin Isa Al Khalifa as a key contributor to economic growth and development.

== Business Groups ==
Kanoo Group consists of the following business groups:

=== Kanoo Capital ===
Kanoo Capital manages the group's investments, providing high inflation-adjusted returns to support both the current and long-term needs of the Group. Its investment approach is a hybrid model of direct securities trading and long-term investment, which seeks appropriate risk-adjusted asset allocation.

=== Industrial & Energy ===
YBA Kanoo's largest division is Industrial & Energy, which was restructured in 2018 to transform from being a sector-focused business and streamlining into five business units groups. The units are: Small to Medium Engineering, Procurement and Construction (EPC), Fabrication & Construction, Operations & Maintenance, Plant & Machinery and Drilling & Chemicals. It represents leading global brands such as Grove, Manitowoc, Hyster, Perkins and Bobcat. Its client base includes Saudi Aramco, SABIC, Ma’aden, Abu Dhabi National Oil Company (ADNOC), and BAPCO. The division has more than 15 branches across Saudi Arabia, UAE, Bahrain, Oman and Qatar.

=== Kanoo Travel ===
Kanoo Travel launched in the late 1930s, and was the first IATA member agency in the GCC. It has since grown to become the largest travel company in the Middle East, with over 900 employees across the region, operating a network of 70 IATA locations.

It has established partnerships in Saudi Arabia, Bahrain, the UAE, Qatar, Oman, Egypt, Lebanon, the United Kingdom and France. YBA Kanoo's Travel division specialises in corporate travel, Meetings, Incentives, Conferences, and Events (MICE), leisure and holiday travel, airline representation and marine travel.

Kanoo Travel represents American Express in Bahrain and Saudi Arabia, with which it has a master franchise agreement covering the Levant, North Africa, the GCC, Iraq, and the CIS countries.

=== Shipping and logistics ===
==== Kanoo Shipping ====
Kanoo Shipping operates in 20 countries. It now assists over 17,000 ships calls a year through a network that covers all ports from the Suez Canal to Sri Lanka and East/South Africa.

In addition to its offices and joint ventures in the Arabian Peninsula, Egypt, and South Africa, the Company's regional network operates through partnerships in Jordan, Lebanon, Pakistan, India, Sri Lanka, Seychelles, Kenya, Tanzania, and Mozambique.

==== Kanoo Logistics ====
Kanoo Logistics is one of the largest logistics companies in the region. The division has a presence throughout the GCC, and facilities in Saudi Arabia, Bahrain, the UAE (Dubai, Jebel Ali and Abu Dhabi), Oman, and Qatar.

=== Real Estate ===
Real Estate's portfolio covers a range of diversified properties in locations that include residential, commercial, and industrial real estate across Bahrain, Saudi Arabia, and the UAE. The division's core lines of business include project development, project management, asset management, and facilities management.

== Partnerships, joint ventures and related businesses ==
Partnerships, joint ventures and related businesses include Maersk, BDP International, BASF, Johnson Arabia, Akzo Nobel, Bahrain Airport Services, National Bank of Bahrain, Gulf Hotels Group, BASREC, Freightworks, Larsen & Toubro.
