= David Kano (actor) =

American actor and film producer

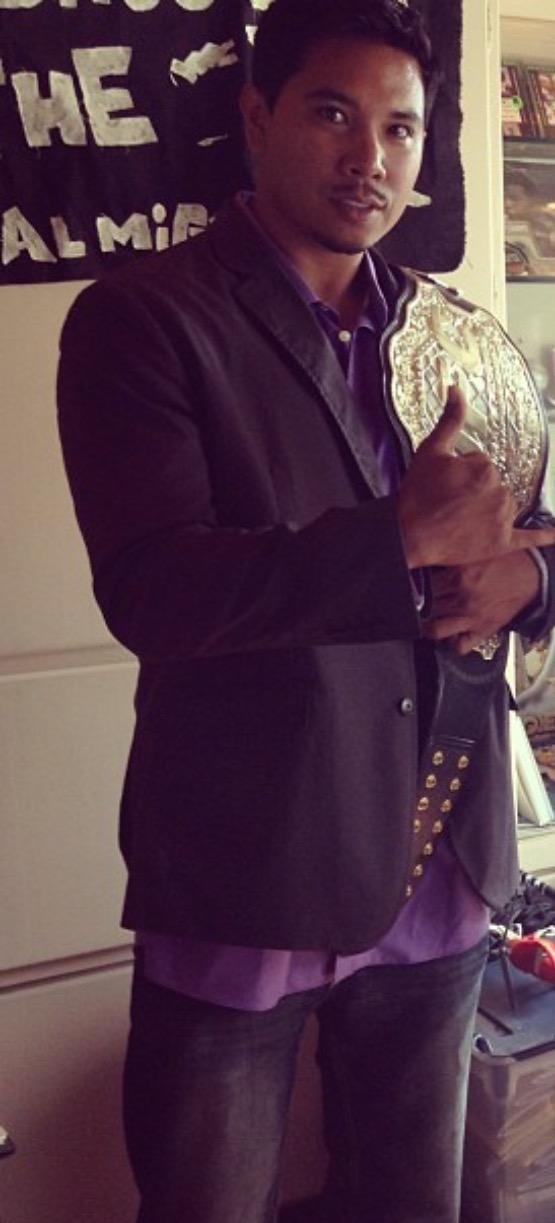
- Born: San Diego, California, United States
- Education: California State University Northridge, B.A., M.A.
- Occupations: Actor, writer, film producer, journalist, reporter
- Known for: A Perfect Prank, Blaxican Brothers, The Hollywood MMA Show, TV Mix

David Kano is an American actor, writer, producer, director, journalist, model, and reporter. He started his entertainment career in commercial and print modeling for Nike, K-Swiss, and appeared as a lead in an NCAA Men's Basketball commercial on CBS. He directed and produced the documentary Concussed: The American Dream which premiered in August 2024 and rose to #2 on Apple TV for Independent Films and #1 on Amazon for new documentary DVD sales.

== Career ==
Kano produced his first feature film Blaxican Brothers which he wrote and starred in alongside Cayce Clayton from US5. Following this film, he wrote an anti-bullying and teen suicide film A Perfect Prank. The film was screened in Southern California and garnered praise from local officials for combatting bullying.

Journalistically, Kano has worked for Examiner as the San Fernando Food Examiner, and TradioV LA to host The Hollywood MMA Show in a live streaming format. Following his stint at there, he went to write for the publication TV Mix as lead writer and reporter for MMA and boxing.

Kano transitioned to a media producer and host role with Alki David's network FilmOn TV where he ran two 24-hour channels covering mixed martial arts and boxing.

It was announced in 2023 that Kano was co-writing UFC and Pride Hall of Famer Dan Henderson's autobiography, and the book was promoted on The Joe Rogan Experience in October 2023.

In February 2025, Kano's production company teased the true crime documentary series, Where Are The Boys? which details the disappearance of two toddlers from California City and the subsequent events which followed.
