= Lee Eun-hye (tennis) =

South Korean tennis player (born 2000)

Lee Eun-hye 이은혜
- Country (sports): South Korea
- Born: 10 May 2000 (age 26) Anyang, South Korea
- Plays: Right (two-handed backhand)
- Prize money: $115,619

Singles
- Career record: 239–154
- Career titles: 5 ITF
- Highest ranking: No. 299 (6 October 2025)
- Current ranking: No. 530 (16 November 2026)

Doubles
- Career record: 92–97
- Career titles: 7 ITF
- Highest ranking: No. 306 (5 January 2026)
- Current ranking: No. 454 (16 November 2026)

Team competitions
- Fed Cup: 4–5
- Last updated on: 21 November 2026.

Lee Eun-hye (Korean: 이은혜; born 10 May 2000) is a South Korean professional tennis player.

She has a career-high singles ranking by the WTA of No. 299, achieved on 6 October 2025.

== Personal life ==
Lee comes from a family of athletes; her parents are former professional canoeists. Her sister, Lee Eun-ji, also is a professional tennis player. Her tennis role model is Serena Williams.

== Career ==
In June 2019, she won the first singles title of her career at the W15 event in Gimcheon, South Korea defeating Japanese Misaki Matsuda. Four years later, in February 2023, she won the second singles title of her career at an ITF W15 event in Sharm El Sheikh, Egypt.

In September 2025, Lee played in the final of the W100 Incheon Open and was defeated player Nao Hibino from Japan.

In September 2026, Lee made her main-draw debut on the WTA Tour in the doubles event of the 2026 Korea Open, partnering with Park So-hyun.

== ITF Circuit finals ==
=== Singles: 13 (5 titles, 8 runner-ups) ===
Legend W100 tournaments W35 tournaments W15 tournaments	Finals by surface Hard (5–8)

Result	W–L	Date	Tournament	Tier	Surface	Opponent	Score
Win	1–0	Jun 2019	ITF Gimcheon, South Korea	W15	Hard	(Japan) Misaki Matsuda	6–3, 6–3
Win	2–0	Feb 2023	ITF Sharm El Sheikh, Egypt	W15	Hard	(Lithuania) Klaudija Bubelytė	6–4, 6–1
Loss	2–1	Jan 2024	ITF Monastir, Tunisia	W15	Hard	(Italy) Arianna Zucchini	5–7, 3–6
Loss	2–2	Mar 2024	ITF Karaganda, Kazakhstan	W15	Hard	Ksenia Laskutova	4–6, 6–3, 3–6
Win	3–2	Jul 2024	ITF Sapporo, Japan	W15	Hard	(Japan) Mio Mushika	7–5, 6–3
Loss	3–3	Jul 2024	ITF Sapporo, Japan	W15	Hard	(Japan) Shiho Akita	6–3, 6–7^{(4)}, 1–6
Loss	3–4	Sep 2024	ITF Yeongwol, South Korea	W15	Hard	(South Korea) Back Da-yeon	2–6, 1–6
Loss	3–5	Oct 2024	ITF Sharm El Sheikh, Egypt	W15	Hard	(Slovakia) Katarína Kužmová	6–0, 4–6, 4–6
Loss	3–6	Nov 2024	ITF Sharm El Sheikh, Egypt	W15	Hard	Maria Golovina	5–7, 2–6
Win	4–6	Nov 2024	ITF Sharm El Sheikh, Egypt	W15	Hard	(Kosovo) Arlinda Rushiti	6–1, 6–4
Win	5–6	Mar 2025	ITF Nonthaburi, Thailand	W35	Hard	(South Korea) Back Da-yeon	6–3, 6–4
Loss	5–7	May 2025	ITF Daegu, South Korea	W15	Hard	(South Korea) Back Da-yeon	5–6 ret.
Loss	5–8	Sep 2025	Incheon Open, South Korea	W100	Hard	(Japan) Nao Hibino	5–7, 6–7^{(2)}

=== Doubles: 13 (7 titles, 6 runner-ups) ===
Legend W75 tournaments W35 tournaments W15 tournaments	Finals by surface Hard (6–5) Clay (1–1)

Result	W–L	Date	Tournament	Tier	Surface	Partner	Opponents	Score
Loss	0–1	Apr 2019	ITF Shymkent, Kazakhstan	W15	Clay	(Uzbekistan) Sevil Yuldasheva	(Russia) Kamilla Rakhimova (Moldova) Vitalia Stamat	3–6, 6–7^{(4)}
Loss	0–2	Nov 2019	ITF Sharm El Sheikh, Egypt	W15	Hard	(South Korea) Jeong Yeong-won	(United Kingdom) Aleksandra Pitak (United Kingdom) Katarzyna Pitak	6–7^{(4)}, 4–6
Win	1–2	Nov 2019	ITF Shymkent, Kazakhstan	W15	Clay	(South Korea) Jeong Yeong-won	(Netherlands) Michaëlla Krajicek (Switzerland) Valentina Ryser	walkover
Loss	1–3	Mar 2022	ITF Sharm-El-Sheikh, Egypt	W15	Hard	(South Korea) Jeong Bo-young	(United States) Dasha Ivanova (Netherlands) Stéphanie Visscher	7–6^{(8)}, 6–7^{(6)}, [7–10]
Win	2–3	Sep 2022	ITF Yeongwol, South Korea	W15	Hard	(South Korea) Back Da-yeon	(Japan) Junri Namigata (Japan) Riko Sawayanagi	7–5, 3–6, [13–11]
Loss	2–4	Sep 2022	ITF Yeongwol, South Korea	W15	Hard	(South Korea) Back Da-yeon	(South Korea) Kim Da-bin (South Korea) Lee So-ra	4–6, 6–3, [10–12]
Win	3–4	Sep 2024	ITF Yeongwol, South Korea	W15	Hard	(South Korea) Back Da-yeon	(South Korea) Kim Na-ri (China) Ye Qiuyu	6–1, 6–1
Win	4–4	Oct 2024	ITF Sharm El Sheikh, Egypt	W15	Hard	(South Korea) Kim Yu-jin	(Egypt) Yasmin Ezzat (Slovakia) Katarína Kužmová	4–6, 6–3, [11–9]
Win	5–4	Feb 2025	ITF Timaru, New Zealand	W35	Hard	(South Korea) Back Da-yeon	(South Korea) Choi On-yu (Japan) Nanari Katsumi	7–5, 6–3
Win	6–4	May 2025	ITF Andong, South Korea	W35	Hard	(South Korea) Back Da-yeon	(South Korea) Han Hyeong-ju (South Korea) Kim Eun-chae	3–6, 6–2, [10–4]
Win	7–4	May 2025	ITF Daegu, South Korea	W15	Hard	(South Korea) Back Da-yeon	(South Korea) Kim Da-bin (South Korea) Ku Yeon-woo	6–1, 6–1
Loss	7–5	Jul 2025	ITF Lu'an, China	W15	Hard	(China) Han Jiangxue	(China) Wang Jiaqi (China) Yuan Chengyiyi	6–0, 1–6, [3–10]
Loss	7–6	Nov 2025	Playford International, Australia	W75	Hard	(South Korea) Back Da-yeon	(Australia) Talia Gibson (Australia) Maddison Inglis	2–6, 0–6
