= Kim Da-bin (tennis) =

South Korean tennis player

Kim Da-bin 김다빈
- Country (sports): South Korea
- Residence: Jochiwon, South Korea
- Born: 2 January 1997 (age 29) Busan, South Korea
- Plays: Right (two-handed backhand)
- Prize money: $94,319

Singles
- Career record: 220–170
- Career titles: 5 ITF
- Highest ranking: No. 318 (5 August 2019)
- Current ranking: No. 987 (9 June 2025)

Doubles
- Career record: 143–124
- Career titles: 10 ITF
- Highest ranking: No. 365 (5 November 2018)
- Current ranking: No. 754 (9 June 2025)
- Last updated on: 9 June 2025.

- Kim Da-bin
- Hangul: 김다빈
- RR: Gim Dabin
- MR: Kim Tabin

Kim Da-bin (Korean: 김다빈; born 2 January 1997) is a South Korean tennis player.

She reached best WTA rankings of 318 in singles and No. 365 in doubles, and has won five singles and 10 doubles titles in tournaments of the ITF Women's Circuit.

Kim made her WTA Tour debut at the 2016 Korea Open, where she received entry into the doubles main draw by a wildcard, partnering Han Sung-hee.

== ITF Circuit finals ==
=== Singles: 12 (5 titles, 7 runner-ups) ===
Legend W60 tournaments W25 tournaments W10/15 tournaments	Finals by surface Hard (5–6) Clay (0–1)

Result	W–L	Date	Tournament	Tier	Surface	Opponent	Score
Win	1–0	Jul 2014	ITF New Delhi, India	W10	Hard	(Hong Kong) Katherine Ip	6–1, 6–3
Loss	1–1	Sep 2016	ITF Yeongwol, South Korea	W10	Hard	(South Korea) Hong Seung-yeon	5–7, 3–6
Loss	1–2	Sep 2017	ITF Yeongwol, South Korea	W15	Hard	(United States) Hanna Chang	5–7, 6–7^{(6)}
Win	2–2	Sep 2017	ITF Yeongwol, South Korea	W15	Hard	(South Korea) Kim Na-ri	7–6^{(10)}, 4–6, 6–3
Win	3–2	Sep 2018	ITF Yeongwol, South Korea	W15	Hard	(South Korea) Park So-hyun	7–5, 6–3
Loss	3–3	Mar 2019	ITF Nanchang, China	W15	Clay	(China) Zhang Ying	6–3, 2–6, 5–7
Win	4–3	Aug 2019	Lexington Challenger, United States	W60	Hard	(United States) Ann Li	6–1, 6–3
Loss	4–4	Jul 2022	ITF Lakewood, United States	W15	Hard	(China) Han Jiangxue	5–7, 5–7
Loss	4–5	Sep 2022	ITF Yeongwol, South Korea	W15	Hard	(South Korea) Back Da-yeon	6–7^{(2)}, 0–3 ret.
Loss	4–6	Jun 2023	ITF Daegu, South Korea	W25	Hard	(South Korea) Park So-hyun	6–2, 2–6, 1–6
Win	5–6	Sep 2023	ITF Yeongwol, South Korea	W15	Hard	(South Korea) Back Da-yeon	6–2, 6–1
Loss	5–7	Sep 2026	ITF Yeongwol, South Korea	W15	Hard	(South Korea) Kim Yu-jin	6–7^{(6)}, 3–6

=== Doubles: 28 (13 titles, 15 runner-ups) ===
Legend W25/35 tournaments W10/15 tournaments	Finals by surface Hard (12–14) Clay (1–1)

Result	W–L	Date	Tournament	Tier	Surface	Partner	Opponents	Score
Win	1–0	Jul 2014	ITF New Delhi, India	10,000	Hard	(India) Rutuja Bhosale	(India) Nidhi Chilumula (South Korea) Han Sung-hee	6–2, 7–6^{(2)}
Win	2–0	Aug 2014	ITF New Delhi, India	10,000	Hard	(India) Rutuja Bhosale	(India) Sharmada Balu (China) Wang Xiyao	6–3, 6–4
Loss	2–1	May 2015	ITF Bangkok, Thailand	10,000	Hard	(Thailand) Kamonwan Buayam	(Chinese Taipei) Hsu Ching-wen (Thailand) Nungnadda Wannasuk	6–4, 6–7^{(4)}, [3–10]
Loss	2–2	Jun 2015	ITF Bangkok, Thailand	10,000	Hard	(Thailand) Kamonwan Buayam	(Oman) Fatma Al-Nabhani (Thailand) Nungnadda Wannasuk	3–6, 5–7
Win	3–2	Sep 2015	ITF Yeongwol, South Korea	10,000	Hard	(China) Wei Zhanlan	(China) Sheng Yuqi (China) Zhao Di	6–1, 6–0
Loss	3–3	Jun 2017	ITF Sangju, South Korea	15,000	Hard	(South Korea) Lee So-ra	(South Korea) Choi Ji-hee (South Korea) Kang Seo-kyung	6–7^{(3)}, 3–6
Loss	3–4	Jun 2017	ITF Gimcheon, South Korea	15,000	Hard	(South Korea) Lee So-ra	(South Korea) Han Sung-hee (South Korea) Hong Seung-yeon	6–3, 4–6, [5–10]
Loss	3–5	Jun 2017	ITF Gimcheon, South Korea	15,000	Hard	(South Korea) Lee So-ra	(South Korea) Choi Ji-hee (South Korea) Kang Seo-kyung	4–6, 2–6
Loss	3–6	Sep 2017	ITF Yeongwol, South Korea	15,000	Hard	(South Korea) Lee So-ra	(South Korea) Kim Na-ri (Chinese Taipei) Lee Pei-chi	1–6, 5–7
Loss	3–7	Feb 2018	ITF Antalya, Turkey	15,000	Hard	(Japan) Haruna Arakawa	(Romania) Elena Bogdan (Romania) Cristina Ene	4–6, 3–6
Loss	3–8	May 2018	ITF Changwon, South Korea	25,000	Hard	(South Korea) Yu Min-hwa	(South Korea) Kim Na-ri (South Korea) Lee So-ra	1–6, 1–6
Win	4–8	Sep 2018	ITF Yeongwol, South Korea	15,000	Hard	(South Korea) Lee So-ra	(South Korea) Bae Do-hee (South Korea) Hong Seong-yeon	6–2, 7–5
Loss	4–9	Feb 2019	ITF Nanchang, China	15,000	Clay	(Hong Kong) Eudice Chong	(China) Cao Siqi (China) Zheng Wushuang	5–7, 6–7^{(4)}
Win	5–9	May 2021	ITF Antalya, Turkey	W15	Clay	(Switzerland) Fiona Ganz	(Turkey) Doğa Türkmen (Turkey) Melis Uyar	7–5, 6–0
Loss	5–10	Jul 2022	ITF Fountain Valley, US	W15	Hard	(China) Han Jiangxue	(United States) Hind Abdelouahid (Chinese Taipei) Yang Ya-yi	5–7, 6–2, [6–10]
Loss	5–11	Aug 2022	ITF Goyang, South Korea	W25	Hard	(Thailand) Punnin Kovapitukted	(Japan) Kyōka Okamura (Thailand) Peangtarn Plipuech	1–6, 0–6
Win	6–11	Sep 2022	ITF Yeongwol, South Korea	W15	Hard	(South Korea) Lee So-ra	(South Korea) Back Da-yeon (South Korea) Lee Eun-hye	6–4, 3–6, [12–10]
Win	7–11	Sep 2023	ITF Yeongwol, South Korea	W15	Hard	(South Korea) Kim Na-ri	(South Korea) Kim Da-hye (Netherlands) Demi Tran	6–2, 7–5
Win	8–11	Sep 2023	ITF Yeongwol, South Korea	W15	Hard	(South Korea) Kim Na-ri	(South Korea) Back Da-yeon (South Korea) Jeong Bo-young	6–2, 6–3
Loss	8–12	Jun 2024	ITF Daegu, South Korea	W35	Hard	(South Korea) Kim Na-ri	(Japan) Ayano Shimizu (Japan) Kisa Yoshioka	4–6, 3–6
Win	9–12	Jun 2024	ITF Tianjin, China	W15	Hard	(South Korea) Kim Na-ri	(China) Xun Fangying (China) Yuan Chengyiyi	6–2, 6–1
Loss	9–13	May 2025	ITF Daegu, South Korea	W15	Hard	(South Korea) Ku Yeon-woo	(South Korea) Back Da-yeon (South Korea) Lee Eun-hye	1–6, 1–6
Win	10–13	Aug 2025	ITF Lu'an, China	W15	Hard	(Chinese Taipei) Lin Fang-an	(China) Huang Yujia (China) Xiao Zhenghua	5–7, 6–3, [10–5]
Win	11–13	Sep 2025	ITF Yeongwol, South Korea	W15	Hard	(South Korea) Im Hee-rae	(South Korea) Lee Su-ha (South Korea) Son Ha-yoon	6–3, 2–6, [10–8]
Win	12–13	Sep 2025	ITF Yeongwol, South Korea	W15	Hard	(Japan) Natsumi Kawaguchi	(South Korea) Ha Sun-min (Hong Kong) Shek Cheuk-ying	6–4, 6–2
Loss	12–14	Apr 2026	ITF Goyang, South Korea	W35	Hard	(South Korea) Park So-hyun	(South Korea) Back Da-yeon (United States) Jaeda Daniel	4–6, 0–6
Loss	12–15	May 2026	ITF Changwon, South Korea	W35	Hard	(South Korea) Lee Ha-eum	(South Korea) Im Hee-rae (South Korea) Kim Eun-chae	4–6, 6–2, [3–10]
Win	13–15	Sep 2026	ITF Yeongwol, South Korea	W15	Hard	(South Korea) Kim Na-ri	(South Korea) Choi Seo-yun (South Korea) Lee Ha-eum	7–5, 3–6, [10–1]
