= Jeong Bo-young =

South Korean tennis player (born 2003)

- Country (sports): South Korea
- Born: 21 May 2003 (age 23)
- Turned pro: 2018
- Prize money: $78,588

Singles
- Career record: 136–113
- Career titles: 4 ITF
- Highest ranking: No. 378 (15 June 2026)
- Current ranking: No. 396 (20 July 2026)

Doubles
- Career record: 100–80
- Career titles: 5 ITF
- Highest ranking: No. 444 (17 February 2025)
- Current ranking: No. 605 (20 July 2026)

Team competitions
- Fed Cup: 2–4
Medal record
Women's tennis
Representing South Korea
Asian Games
| Bronze medal – third place | 2022 Hangzhou | Doubles |
- Last updated on: 26 July 2026.

- Jeong Bo-young
- Hangul: 정보영
- RR: Jeong Boyeong
- MR: Chŏng Poyŏng

Jeong Bo-young (Korean: 정보영, born 21 May 2003) is a South Korean professional tennis player.

Jeong has a career-high singles ranking of 378 by the WTA, achieved on 15 June 2026. She also has a career-high WTA doubles ranking of 444, achieved on 17 February 2025. She has won four singles and four doubles titles on the ITF World Tour

Jeong made her WTA Tour main-draw debut at the 2022 Korea Open, after receiving a wildcard for the singles tournament, losing in the first round to Jelena Ostapenko in three sets.

== ITF Circuit finals ==
=== Singles: 9 (4 titles, 5 runner-ups) ===
| Legend W35 tournaments (1–2) W15 tournaments (3–3) | Finals by surface Hard (4–5) |

| Result | W–L | Date | Tournament | Tier | Surface | Opponent | Score |
|---|---|---|---|---|---|---|---|
| Loss | 0–1 | Sep 2024 | ITF Yeongwol, South Korea | W15 | Hard | (South Korea) Back Da-yeon | 1–6, 2–6 |
| Win | 1–1 | Dec 2024 | ITF Stellenbosch, South Africa | W15 | Hard | (South Africa) Jahnie van Zyl | 6–2, 7–6^{(5)} |
| Loss | 1–2 | Apr 2025 | ITF Wuning, China | W15 | Hard | (China) Yang Yidi | 3–6, 3–6 |
| Win | 2–2 | Aug 2025 | ITF Lu'an, China | W15 | Hard | (Chinese Taipei) Yang Ya-yi | 6–4, 6–2 |
| Win | 3–2 | Oct 2025 | ITF Darwin, Australia | W35 | Hard | (Australia) Elena Micic | 6–2, 7–5 |
| Loss | 3–3 | Mar 2026 | ITF Maanshan, China | W15 | Hard (i) | (China) Wang Jiaqi | 1–6, 6–7^{(5)} |
| Win | 4–3 | Mar 2026 | ITF Maanshan, China | W15 | Hard (i) | (Thailand) Anchisa Chanta | 4–6, 6–2, 7–5 |
| Loss | 4–4 | Apr 2026 | ITF Miyazaki, Japan | W35 | Hard | (United States) Hanna Chang | 3–6, 2–4 ret. |
| Loss | 4–5 | May 2026 | ITF Andong, South Korea | W35 | Hard | (South Korea) Back Da-yeon | 6–3, 2–6, 0–6 |

=== Doubles: 18 (5 titles, 13 runner-ups) ===
| Legend W35 tournaments W15 tournaments | Finals by surface Hard (5–13) |

| Result | W–L | Date | Tournament | Tier | Surface | Partner | Opponents | Score |
|---|---|---|---|---|---|---|---|---|
| Loss | 0–1 | Mar 2022 | ITF Sharm-El-Sheikh, Egypt | W15 | Hard | (South Korea) Lee Eun-hye | (United States) Dasha Ivanova (Netherlands) Stephanie Visscher | 7–6^{(8)}, 6–7^{(6)}, [7–10] |
| Loss | 0–2 | Jul 2022 | ITF Monastir, Tunisia | W15 | Hard | (South Korea) Back Da-yeon | (Indonesia) Priska Madelyn Nugroho (China) Wei Sijia | 4–6, 1–6 |
| Loss | 0–3 | Mar 2023 | ITF Sharm El Sheikh, Egypt | W15 | Hard | (South Korea) Back Da-yeon | Polina Iatcenko (Egypt) Sandra Samir | 4–6, 5–7 |
| Loss | 0–4 | Aug 2023 | ITF Sapporo, Japan | W15 | Hard | (South Korea) Back Da-yeon | (Japan) Mao Mushika (Japan) Himari Satō | 3–6, 4–6 |
| Loss | 0–5 | Aug 2023 | ITF Sapporo, Japan | W15 | Hard | (South Korea) Back Da-yeon | (Japan) Nana Kawagishi (Japan) Kisa Yoshioka | 3–6, 3–6 |
| Loss | 0–6 | Sep 2023 | ITF Yeongwol, South Korea | W15 | Hard | (South Korea) Back Da-yeon | (South Korea) Kim Dabin (South Korea) Kim Na-ri | 2–6, 3–6 |
| Win | 1–6 | Feb 2024 | ITF Sharm El Sheikh, Egypt | W15 | Hard | (Netherlands) Sarah van Emst | Evgeniya Burdina (Egypt) Yasmin Ezzat | 6–2, 6–1 |
| Win | 2–6 | Mar 2024 | ITF Sharm El Sheikh | W15 | Hard | (Lithuania) Andrė Lukošiūtė | (Poland) Daria Kuczer (Estonia) Liisa Varul | 6–2, 6–0 |
| Loss | 2–7 | Mar 2024 | ITF Sharm El Sheikh | W15 | Hard | (Romania) Karola Bejenaru | (France) Julie Belgraver (United Kingdom) Holly Hutchinson | 6–7^{(4)}, 6–3, [7–10] |
| Win | 3–7 | Jul 2024 | ITF Nakhon Si Thammarat, Thailand | W35 | Hard | (Japan) Rinon Okuwaki | (India) Vaidehi Chaudhari (Thailand) Peangtarn Plipuech | 2–6, 7–5, [10–7] |
| Loss | 3–8 | Jul 2024 | ITF Nakhon Si Thammarat | W15 | Hard | (Thailand) Punnin Kovapitukted | (Australia) Monique Barry (Australia) Alicia Smith | 4–6, 3–6 |
| Loss | 3–9 | Jul 2024 | ITF Sapporo, Japan | W15 | Hard | (Hong Kong) Cody Wong | (Japan) Mana Ayukawa (Japan) Mao Mushika | 3–6, 4–6 |
| Loss | 3–10 | Oct 2024 | ITF Makinohara, Japan | W35 | Carpet | (Japan) Ayumi Miyamoto | (Japan) Kanako Morisaki (Japan) Eri Shimizu | 2–6, 1–6 |
| Loss | 3–11 | Jun 2025 | ITF Hong Kong, China | W15 | Hard | (China) Tian Fangran | Evgeniya Burdina; Anastasia Grechkina | 2–6, 2–6 |
| Loss | 3–12 | Jun 2025 | ITF Hong Kong | W15 | Hard | (China) Tian Fangran | (Hong Kong) Shek Cheuk Ying (China) Zhang Ying | 1–6, 1–6 |
| Win | 4–12 | Mar 2026 | ITF Maanshan, China | W15 | Hard (i) | (South Korea) Cherry Kim | (China) Sun Yifan (China) Zhao Xichen | 6–1, 6–1 |
| Loss | 4–13 | May 2026 | ITF Andong, South Korea | W35 | Hard | (South Korea) Park So-hyun | (South Korea) Back Da-yeon (South Korea) Jang Su-jeong | 4–6, 3–6 |
| Win | 5–13 | Aug 2026 | ITF Yeongwol, South Korea | W15 | Hard | (South Korea) Kim Na-ri | (Japan) Chihiro Muramatsu (Japan) Kisa Yoshioka | 6–4, 6–2 |
