= Park So-hyun (tennis) =

South Korean very st up id tennis player (born 2002)

Park So-hyun 박소현
- Country (sports): South Korea
- Born: 2 July 2002 (age 24)
- Plays: Right-handed
- Prize money: $199,447

Singles
- Career record: 242–152
- Career titles: 10 ITF
- Highest ranking: No. 244 (16 February 2026)
- Current ranking: No. 310 (9 November 2026)

Doubles
- Career record: 146–107
- Career titles: 9 ITF
- Highest ranking: No. 181 (16 February 2026)
- Current ranking: No. 251 (9 November 2026)

Team competitions
- BJK Cup: 14–11
- Last updated on: 14 November 2026.

- Park So-hyun
- Hangul: 박소현
- RR: Bak Sohyeon
- MR: Pak Sohyŏn

Park So-hyun (Korean: 박소현; born 2 July 2002) is a South Korean tennis player. She has career-high WTA rankings of 244 in singles and of 181 in doubles, achieved on 16 February 2026.

On the ITF Junior Circuit, she reached a career-high combined ranking of No. 17, on 14 October 2019.

== Career ==
Park made her WTA Tour main-draw debut at the 2018 Korea Open, after being handed a wildcard into the singles tournament.

She made her debut for the South Korean Billie Jean King Cup team in April 2022 in a tie against Indonesia and has accumulated a win/loss record of 14–11.

== ITF Circuit finals ==
=== Singles: 15 (10 titles, 5 runner-ups) ===
Legend W50 tournaments (1–0) W25/35 tournaments (6–1) W15 tournaments (3–4)	Finals by surface Hard (6–3) Clay (4–2)

Result	W–L	Date	Tournament	Tier	Surface	Opponent	Score
Loss	0–1	Aug 2018	ITF Yeongwol, South Korea	W15	Hard	(South Korea) Kim Da-bin	5–7, 3–6
Win	1–1	Apr 2019	ITF Antalya, Turkey	W15	Clay	(Switzerland) Joanne Züger	6–2, 4–6, 6–4
Loss	1–2	Feb 2020	ITF Hamilton, New Zealand	W15	Hard	(Japan) Eri Shimizu	4–6, 6–0, 3–6
Loss	1–3	Feb 2021	ITF Antalya, Turkey	W15	Clay	(Romania) Miriam Bulgaru	2–6, 3–6
Win	2–3	Mar 2021	ITF Antalya, Turkey	W15	Clay	(Italy) Nuria Brancaccio	6–4, 6–0
Loss	2–4	Jul 2021	ITF Vejle, Denmark	W15	Clay	(Denmark) Johanne Svendsen	6–2, 4–6, 1–6
Win	3–4	Aug 2021	ITF Marbella, Spain	W25	Clay	(Russia) Marina Melnikova	6–1, 7–6^{(6)}
Win	4–4	Mar 2023	ITF Jakarta, Indonesia	W15	Hard	(Russia) Anastasia Kovaleva	6–3, 6–3
Win	5–4	May 2023	ITF Changwon, South Korea	W25	Hard	(Chinese Taipei) Liang En-shuo	6–4, 7–5
Win	6–4	Jun 2023	ITF Daegu, South Korea	W25	Hard	(South Korea) Kim Da-bin	2–6, 6–2, 6–1
Loss	6–5	Jul 2023	ITF Roehampton, United Kingdom	W25	Hard	(United States) Asia Muhammad	2–6, 0–1 ret.
Win	7–5	Feb 2025	ITF Ahmedabad, India	W50	Hard	(Australia) Arina Rodionova	6–3, 6–0
Win	8–5	Jul 2025	ITF Horb, Germany	W35	Clay	(France) Astrid Lew Yan Foon	6–2, 1–6, 7–6^{(4)}
Win	9–5	Dec 2025	ITF New Delhi, India	W35	Hard	(France) Ksenia Efremova	2–6, 6–4, 6–3
Win	10–5	May 2026	ITF Goyang, South Korea	W35	Hard	(Japan) Rinko Matsuda	4–6, 6–3, 6–4

=== Doubles: 24 (9 titles, 15 runner-ups) ===
Legend W100 tournaments (1–0) W75 tournaments (0–1) W50 tournaments (2–2) W25/35 tournaments (5–9) W15 tournaments (1–3)	Finals by surface Hard (5–9) Clay (4–6)

Result	W–L	Date	Tournament	Tier	Surface	Partner	Opponents	Score
Loss	0–1	Mar 2019	ITF Antalya, Turkey	W15	Clay	(Estonia) Elena Malõgina	(Czech Republic) Johana Marková (Slovenia) Nika Radišić	0–6, 0–6
Loss	0–2	Mar 2021	ITF Antalya, Turkey	W15	Clay	(South Korea) Jang Su-jeong	(United States) Jessie Aney (Brazil) Ingrid Martins	2–6, 2–6
Loss	0–3	Mar 2021	ITF Antalya, Turkey	W15	Clay	(United States) Jessie Aney	(South Korea) Han Na-lae (South Korea) Lee So-ra	6–4, 5–7, [4–10]
Win	1–3	Apr 2021	ITF Cairo, Egypt	W15	Clay	(Russia) Elina Avanesyan	(Slovakia) Barbora Matúšová (Russia) Anastasia Zolotareva	6–4, 6–4
Win	2–3	Apr 2021	ITF Oeiras, Portugal	W25	Clay	(Hungary) Adrienn Nagy	(India) Riya Bhatia (Brazil) Gabriela Cé	6–4, 6–0
Loss	2–4	Jul 2022	ITF Getxo, Spain	W25	Clay	(Greece) Sapfo Sakellaridi	(Spain) Jéssica Bouzas Maneiro (Spain) Leyre Romero Gormaz	5–7, 0–6
Loss	2–5	Nov 2022	ITF Sharm El Sheikh, Egypt	W25	Hard	(Switzerland) Jenny Dürst	(Russia) Polina Iatcenko (Russia) Alina Korneeva	1–6, 7–6^{(1)}, [5–10]
Loss	2–6	Mar 2023	ITF Jakarta, Indonesia	W25	Hard	(South Korea) Choi Ji-hee	(China) Guo Hanyu (Hong Kong) Cody Wong	2–6, 6–7^{(6)}
Win	3–6	Jun 2023	ITF Daegu, South Korea	W25	Hard	(Hong Kong) Cody Wong	(Chinese Taipei) Cho I-hsuan (Chinese Taipei) Cho Yi-tsen	4–6, 7–6^{(2)}, [14–12]
Win	4–6	Aug 2023	ITF Nakhon Si Thammarat, Thailand	W25	Hard	(Thailand) Luksika Kumkhum	(India) Vaidehi Chaudhari (India) Zeel Desai	7–6^{(4)}, 6–0
Loss	4–7	Mar 2024	ITF Indore, India	W35	Hard	(Chinese Taipei) Lee Ya-hsuan	(India) Shrivalli Bhamidipaty (India) Vaidehi Chaudhari	3–6, 5–7
Loss	4–8	May 2024	Kunming Open, China	W50	Clay	(China) Feng Shuo	(United States) Haley Giavara (Chinese Taipei) Li Yu-yun	3–6, 1–6
Loss	4–9	Jul 2024	Championnats de Granby, Canada	W75+H	Hard	(Chinese Taipei) Liang En-shuo	(Canada) Ariana Arseneault (Canada) Mia Kupres	4–6, 6–0, [6–10]
Loss	4–10	Oct 2024	ITF Norman, US	W35	Hard (i)	(United States) Makenna Jones	(United States) Jessica Failla (United States) Maribella Zamarripa	6–3, 2–6, [5–10]
Loss	4–11	Jan 2025	GB Pro-Series Sunderland, UK	W35	Hard (i)	(Hong Kong) Cody Wong	(United States) Amelia Rajecki (United States) Anna Rogers	6–2, 3–6, [8–10]
Win	5–11	Mar 2025	All Japan Indoors	W50	Hard (i)	(Japan) Saki Imamura	(Japan) Momoko Kobori (Japan) Ayano Shimizu	7–5, 6–4
Loss	5–12	Jun 2025	ITF Taipei, Taiwan	W35	Hard	(Japan) Ayano Shimizu	(South Korea) Ku Yeon-woo (Japan) Eri Shimizu	4–6, 6–2, [5–10]
Win	6–12	Jun 2025	ITF Taipei, Taiwan	W35	Hard	(Indonesia) Janice Tjen	(Chinese Taipei) Li Yu-yun (Japan) Eri Shimizu	6–1, 7–5
Win	7–12	Aug 2025	ITF Leipzig, Germany	W50	Clay	(Thailand) Peangtarn Plipuech	(Germany) Lola Giza (Bulgaria) Isabella Shinikova	6–1, 6–4
Win	8–12	Sep 2025	Incheon Open, South Korea	W100	Hard	(Japan) Saki Imamura	(Japan) Hiroko Kuwata (Indonesia) Priska Nugroho	6–3, 4–6, [10–7]
Loss	8–13	Apr 2026	ITF Goyang, South Korea	W35	Hard	(South Korea) Kim Da-bin	(South Korea) Back Da-yeon (United States) Jaeda Daniel	4–6, 0–6
Loss	8–14	May 2026	ITF Andong, South Korea	W35	Hard	(South Korea) Jeong Bo-young	(South Korea) Back Da-yeon (South Korea) Jang Su-jeong	4–6, 3–6
Loss	8–15	Jul 2026	ITF Horb, Germany	W50	Clay	(South Korea) Back Da-yeon	(France) Lucie Nguyen Tan (Greece) Sapfo Sakellaridi	2–6, 6–2, [7–10]
Win	9–15	Aug 2026	ITF Erwitte, Germany	W35	Clay	(New Zealand) Monique Barry	(Netherlands) Madelief Hageman (Netherlands) Klara Veldman	6–7^{(0)}, 6–3, [10–7]

== Top 5 highest rank wins ==
#	Tournament	Category	Start date	Surface	Rd	Opponent	Rank	Score	PSR
1	Glasgow, United Kingdom	W25	14 Feb 2022	Hard (i)	1R	(Russia) Vitalia Diatchenko	No. 123	6–2, 6–3	No. 339
2	Tokyo Open, Japan	W100	21 Apr 2025	Hard	1R	(Japan) Sara Saito	No. 165	7–5, 6–2	No. 307
3	Korea Open qualifying	WTA 500	16 Sep 2024	Hard	Q1	(United States) Hanna Chang	No. 193	6–3, 6–3	No. 402
4	Marbella, Spain	W25	30 Aug 2021	Clay	F	(Russia) Marina Melnikova	No. 196	6–1, 7–6^{(8–6)}	No. 401
5	Marbella, Spain	W25	30 Aug 2021	Clay	2R	(Italy) Giulia Gatto-Monticone	No. 200	6–0, 3–0 ret.	No. 401

- statistics correct as of 13 September 2025.
