= 2020 ITF Women's World Tennis Tour (January–March) =

The 2020 ITF Women's World Tennis Tour is the 2020 edition of the second-tier tour for women's professional tennis. It is organised by the International Tennis Federation and is a tier below the WTA Tour. The ITF Women's World Tennis Tour includes tournaments with prize money ranging from $15,000 up to $100,000.

== Key ==
Category
W100 tournaments
W80 tournaments
W60 tournaments
W25 tournaments
W15 tournaments

== Month ==
=== January ===
Week of	Tournament	Winner	Runners-up	Semifinalists	Quarterfinalists
January 6	Canberra Tennis International; Bendigo, (Note: Tournament was moved from Canberra to Bendigo due to the smoke affecting Canberra from the 2019–20 Australian bushfire season.) Australia; Hard; W25; Singles and Doubles Draws	(Poland) Magdalena Fręch; Walkover	(Romania) Patricia Maria Țig	(India) Ankita Raina (Georgia (country)) Ekaterine Gorgodze	(Hungary) Anna Bondár (United States) Sachia Vickery (Japan) Chihiro Muramatsu (Slovakia) Kristína Kučová
January 6	Canberra Tennis International; Bendigo, Australia; Hard; W25; Singles and Doubles Draws	(Australia) Alison Bai (Australia) Jaimee Fourlis; 5–7, 6–4, [10–8]	(Hungary) Anna Bondár (Turkey) Pemra Özgen	(India) Ankita Raina (Georgia (country)) Ekaterine Gorgodze	(Hungary) Anna Bondár (United States) Sachia Vickery (Japan) Chihiro Muramatsu (Slovakia) Kristína Kučová
January 6	ITF Women's Circuit – Hong Kong; Hong Kong; Hard; W25; Singles and Doubles Draws	(Russia) Anastasiya Komardina; 3–6, 6–4, 6–2	(China) Xun Fangying	(Japan) Akiko Omae (Japan) Moyuka Uchijima	(Hong Kong) Eudice Chong (Switzerland) Leonie Küng (Croatia) Jana Fett (Japan) Junri Namigata
January 6	ITF Women's Circuit – Hong Kong; Hong Kong; Hard; W25; Singles and Doubles Draws	(Japan) Mana Ayukawa (Hong Kong) Eudice Chong; 6–4, 6–3	(Japan) Momoko Kobori (Japan) Mei Yamaguchi	(Japan) Akiko Omae (Japan) Moyuka Uchijima	(Hong Kong) Eudice Chong (Switzerland) Leonie Küng (Croatia) Jana Fett (Japan) Junri Namigata
January 6	Monastir, Tunisia; Hard; W15; Singles and Doubles Draws	(Uzbekistan) Sabina Sharipova; 7–6^{(7–5)}, 6–3	(France) Mallaurie Noël	(India) Zeel Desai (France) Alice Tubello	(France) Victoria Muntean (Poland) Martyna Kubka (Russia) Anastasia Tikhonova (France) Lou Adler
January 6	Monastir, Tunisia; Hard; W15; Singles and Doubles Draws	(India) Zeel Desai (Russia) Anastasia Tikhonova; 7–6^{(7–4)}, 5–7, [10–5]	(Serbia) Bojana Marinković (Slovakia) Tereza Mihalíková	(India) Zeel Desai (France) Alice Tubello	(France) Victoria Muntean (Poland) Martyna Kubka (Russia) Anastasia Tikhonova (France) Lou Adler
January 6	Antalya, Turkey; Clay; W15; Singles and Doubles Draws	(Turkey) Zeynep Sönmez; 6–3, 2–6, 6–3	(Greece) Sapfo Sakellaridi	(Russia) Anna Ureke (Italy) Nicole Fossa Huergo	(Russia) Anastasia Kovaleva (Croatia) Oleksandra Oliynykova (Spain) Lucía Cortez Llorca (Russia) Diana Demidova
January 6	Antalya, Turkey; Clay; W15; Singles and Doubles Draws	(Croatia) Oleksandra Oliynykova (Greece) Sapfo Sakellaridi; 6–2, 6–2	(Russia) Vasilisa Aponasenko (Italy) Nicole Fossa Huergo	(Russia) Anna Ureke (Italy) Nicole Fossa Huergo	(Russia) Anastasia Kovaleva (Croatia) Oleksandra Oliynykova (Spain) Lucía Cortez Llorca (Russia) Diana Demidova
January 13	Daytona Beach, United States; Clay; W25; Singles and Doubles Draws	(Belgium) Marie Benoît; 6–4, 6–0	(Spain) Andrea Lázaro García	(Spain) Guiomar Maristany (Romania) Gabriela Talabă	(Switzerland) Ylena In-Albon (Hungary) Dalma Gálfi (Chile) Daniela Seguel (United Kingdom) Amanda Carreras
January 13	Daytona Beach, United States; Clay; W25; Singles and Doubles Draws	(Hungary) Dalma Gálfi (Belgium) Kimberley Zimmermann; 7–6^{(7–4)}, 6–2	(Argentina) Paula Ormaechea (India) Prarthana Thombare	(Spain) Guiomar Maristany (Romania) Gabriela Talabă	(Switzerland) Ylena In-Albon (Hungary) Dalma Gálfi (Chile) Daniela Seguel (United Kingdom) Amanda Carreras
January 13	Malibu, United States; Hard; W25; Singles and Doubles Draws	(Argentina) Nadia Podoroska; 4–6, 6–3, 6–3	(United States) Claire Liu	(Mexico) Ana Sofía Sánchez (Italy) Jessica Pieri	(France) Amandine Hesse (Kazakhstan) Anna Danilina (United States) Catherine Harrison (United States) Hanna Chang
January 13	Malibu, United States; Hard; W25; Singles and Doubles Draws	(Brazil) Laura Pigossi (Netherlands) Rosalie van der Hoek; 6–4, 7–6^{(7–4)}	(Norway) Astrid Wanja Brune Olsen (Peru) Anastasia Iamachkine	(Mexico) Ana Sofía Sánchez (Italy) Jessica Pieri	(France) Amandine Hesse (Kazakhstan) Anna Danilina (United States) Catherine Harrison (United States) Hanna Chang
January 13	Cairo, Egypt; Clay; W15; Singles and Doubles Draws	(Netherlands) Cindy Burger; 6–1, 7–5	(Czech Republic) Anna Sisková	(Bulgaria) Julia Stamatova (France) Lucie Wargnier	(Slovakia) Chantal Škamlová (Russia) Anna Morgina (Russia) Anastasia Zolotareva (Spain) Eva Martínez Regalado
January 13	Cairo, Egypt; Clay; W15; Singles and Doubles Draws	(Belgium) Hélène Scholsen (Slovakia) Chantal Škamlová; 6–0, 6–4	(Russia) Sofia Dmitrieva (Russia) Viktoriia Kalinina	(Bulgaria) Julia Stamatova (France) Lucie Wargnier	(Slovakia) Chantal Škamlová (Russia) Anna Morgina (Russia) Anastasia Zolotareva (Spain) Eva Martínez Regalado
January 13	Fort-de-France, Martinique, France; Hard; W15; Singles and Doubles Draws	(France) Audrey Albié; 6–3, 6–4	(France) Marine Partaud	(France) Julie Gervais (Belgium) Magali Kempen	(France) Loudmilla Bencheikh (France) Salma Djoubri (Sweden) Fanny Östlund (France) Manon Léonard
January 13	Fort-de-France, Martinique, France; Hard; W15; Singles and Doubles Draws	(France) Audrey Albié (France) Marine Partaud; 6–2, 7–6^{(7–3)}	(United States) Alexandra Riley (United States) Jamilah Snells	(France) Julie Gervais (Belgium) Magali Kempen	(France) Loudmilla Bencheikh (France) Salma Djoubri (Sweden) Fanny Östlund (France) Manon Léonard
January 13	Cancún, Mexico; Hard; W15; Singles and Doubles Draws	(United States) Sofia Sewing; 7–5, 6–0	(Russia) Anastasia Sysoeva	(United States) Joelle Kissell (United States) Emma Davis	(United States) Sabina Dadaciu (United States) Amy Zhu (Lithuania) Justina Mikulskytė (United States) Malaika Rapolu
January 13	Cancún, Mexico; Hard; W15; Singles and Doubles Draws	(Lithuania) Justina Mikulskytė (Netherlands) Lian Tran; 6–2, 4–6, [10–7]	(Mexico) Victoria Rodríguez (United States) Sofia Sewing	(United States) Joelle Kissell (United States) Emma Davis	(United States) Sabina Dadaciu (United States) Amy Zhu (Lithuania) Justina Mikulskytė (United States) Malaika Rapolu
January 13	Monastir, Tunisia; Hard; W15; Singles and Doubles Draws	(France) Victoria Muntean; 6–1, 0–6, 7–6^{(7–5)}	(United Kingdom) Jodie Burrage	(Kazakhstan) Gozal Ainitdinova (France) Mallaurie Noël	(India) Zeel Desai (Finland) Oona Orpana (France) Manon Arcangioli (Uzbekistan) Sabina Sharipova
January 13	Monastir, Tunisia; Hard; W15; Singles and Doubles Draws	(United Kingdom) Jodie Burrage (Slovakia) Tereza Mihalíková; 6–1, 6–2	(France) Mallaurie Noël (Finland) Oona Orpana	(Kazakhstan) Gozal Ainitdinova (France) Mallaurie Noël	(India) Zeel Desai (Finland) Oona Orpana (France) Manon Arcangioli (Uzbekistan) Sabina Sharipova
January 13	Antalya, Turkey; Clay; W15; Singles and Doubles Draws	(Slovenia) Nina Potočnik; 6–3, 6–2	(Russia) Taisya Pachkaleva	(United States) Chiara Scholl (Russia) Ksenia Laskutova	(China) Han Jiangxue (Italy) Nicole Fossa Huergo (Russia) Diana Demidova (Croatia) Silvia Njirić
January 13	Antalya, Turkey; Clay; W15; Singles and Doubles Draws	(Kazakhstan) Zhibek Kulambayeva (China) Ma Yexin; 6–4, 6–2	(Russia) Ksenia Laskutova (Russia) Anna Ureke	(United States) Chiara Scholl (Russia) Ksenia Laskutova	(China) Han Jiangxue (Italy) Nicole Fossa Huergo (Russia) Diana Demidova (Croatia) Silvia Njirić
January 20	Petit-Bourg, Guadeloupe, France; Hard; W25; Singles and Doubles Draws	(Argentina) Nadia Podoroska; 7–5, 7–5	(France) Harmony Tan	(Luxembourg) Eléonora Molinaro (Switzerland) Leonie Küng	(France) Audrey Albié (France) Julie Gervais (France) Myrtille Georges (United Kingdom) Francesca Jones
January 20	Petit-Bourg, Guadeloupe, France; Hard; W25; Singles and Doubles Draws	(Brazil) Laura Pigossi (Netherlands) Rosalie van der Hoek; 6–2, 6–1	(France) Mylène Halemai (France) Manon Léonard	(Luxembourg) Eléonora Molinaro (Switzerland) Leonie Küng	(France) Audrey Albié (France) Julie Gervais (France) Myrtille Georges (United Kingdom) Francesca Jones
January 20	Kazan, Russia; Hard (indoor); W25; Singles and Doubles Draws	(Russia) Anastasia Zakharova; 6–3, 6–2	(Serbia) Dejana Radanović	(Greece) Valentini Grammatikopoulou (Russia) Alina Charaeva	(Belarus) Shalimar Talbi (Russia) Taisya Pachkaleva (Russia) Sofya Lansere (Russia) Olga Doroshina
January 20	Kazan, Russia; Hard (indoor); W25; Singles and Doubles Draws	(Russia) Ekaterina Yashina (Russia) Anastasia Zakharova; 6–2, 6–4	(Russia) Natela Dzalamidze (Russia) Yana Sizikova	(Greece) Valentini Grammatikopoulou (Russia) Alina Charaeva	(Belarus) Shalimar Talbi (Russia) Taisya Pachkaleva (Russia) Sofya Lansere (Russia) Olga Doroshina
January 20	Vero Beach, United States; Clay; W25; Singles and Doubles Draws	(Chile) Daniela Seguel; 7–5, 6–4	(Croatia) Tereza Mrdeža	(Mexico) Renata Zarazúa (Hungary) Dalma Gálfi	(Canada) Françoise Abanda (Spain) Irene Burillo Escorihuela (Argentina) Paula Ormaechea (Spain) Guiomar Maristany
January 20	Vero Beach, United States; Clay; W25; Singles and Doubles Draws	(Chinese Taipei) Hsu Chieh-yu (Hungary) Panna Udvardy; 7–5, 4–6, [10–7]	(Spain) Irene Burillo Escorihuela (Spain) Andrea Lázaro García	(Mexico) Renata Zarazúa (Hungary) Dalma Gálfi	(Canada) Françoise Abanda (Spain) Irene Burillo Escorihuela (Argentina) Paula Ormaechea (Spain) Guiomar Maristany
January 20	Cairo, Egypt; Clay; W15; Singles and Doubles Draws	(France) Lucie Wargnier; 6–1, 2–6, 6–3	(Slovakia) Chantal Škamlová	(Italy) Gloria Ceschi (Serbia) Tamara Čurović	(Belgium) Hélène Scholsen (Bulgaria) Julia Stamatova (Russia) Anastasia Sukhotina (Slovenia) Nastja Kolar
January 20	Cairo, Egypt; Clay; W15; Singles and Doubles Draws	(Belgium) Hélène Scholsen (Slovakia) Chantal Škamlová; 6–7^{(4–7)}, 6–1, [10–7]	(Kazakhstan) Kamila Kerimbayeva (Moldova) Vitalia Stamat	(Italy) Gloria Ceschi (Serbia) Tamara Čurović	(Belgium) Hélène Scholsen (Bulgaria) Julia Stamatova (Russia) Anastasia Sukhotina (Slovenia) Nastja Kolar
January 20	Stuttgart, Germany; Hard (indoor); W15; Singles and Doubles Draws	(Bulgaria) Julia Terziyska; 6–3, 6–4	(Bosnia and Herzegovina) Dea Herdželaš	(Austria) Sinja Kraus (Italy) Angelica Moratelli	(Czech Republic) Denisa Hindová (Chinese Taipei) Joanna Garland (Germany) Anna Zaja (France) Marine Szostak
January 20	Stuttgart, Germany; Hard (indoor); W15; Singles and Doubles Draws	(Russia) Alena Fomina (Italy) Angelica Moratelli; 7–5, 6–2	(Czech Republic) Karolína Beránková (Portugal) Francisca Jorge	(Austria) Sinja Kraus (Italy) Angelica Moratelli	(Czech Republic) Denisa Hindová (Chinese Taipei) Joanna Garland (Germany) Anna Zaja (France) Marine Szostak
January 20	Liepāja, Latvia; Hard (indoor); W15; Singles and Doubles Draws	(Latvia) Elza Tomase; 0–6, 6–3, 6–1	(Netherlands) Quirine Lemoine	(Slovakia) Viktória Morvayová (Estonia) Elena Malõgina	(Estonia) Katriin Saar (Latvia) Daniela Vismane (Finland) Anastasia Kulikova (Israel) Lina Glushko
January 20	Liepāja, Latvia; Hard (indoor); W15; Singles and Doubles Draws	(Belarus) Katyarina Paulenka (Russia) Ekaterina Shalimova; 4–6, 6–3, [12–10]	(Poland) Weronika Falkowska (Poland) Martyna Kubka	(Slovakia) Viktória Morvayová (Estonia) Elena Malõgina	(Estonia) Katriin Saar (Latvia) Daniela Vismane (Finland) Anastasia Kulikova (Israel) Lina Glushko
January 20	Cancún, Mexico; Hard; W15; Singles and Doubles Draws	(United States) Alexa Noel; 6–3, 6–2	(Russia) Nika Kukharchuk	(United States) Emma Davis (Lithuania) Justina Mikulskytė	(Netherlands) Arianne Hartono (Canada) Stacey Fung (Netherlands) Eva Vedder (Japan) Funa Kozaki
January 20	Cancún, Mexico; Hard; W15; Singles and Doubles Draws	(Netherlands) Eva Vedder (Netherlands) Stéphanie Visscher; 6–3, 6–4	(Japan) Mayuka Aikawa (Japan) Utaka Kishigami	(United States) Emma Davis (Lithuania) Justina Mikulskytė	(Netherlands) Arianne Hartono (Canada) Stacey Fung (Netherlands) Eva Vedder (Japan) Funa Kozaki
January 20	Manacor, Spain; Hard; W15; Singles and Doubles Draws	(Romania) Ioana Loredana Roșca; 6–4, 6–1	(Spain) Rosa Vicens Mas	(France) Margot Yerolymos (Spain) Jéssica Bouzas Maneiro	(Spain) Alba Carrillo Marín (France) Alizé Lim (Austria) Mira Antonitsch (France) Alice Robbe
January 20	Manacor, Spain; Hard; W15; Singles and Doubles Draws	(Switzerland) Nina Stadler (France) Margot Yerolymos; 2–6, 6–3, [10–5]	(Russia) Maria Marfutina (Italy) Camilla Rosatello	(France) Margot Yerolymos (Spain) Jéssica Bouzas Maneiro	(Spain) Alba Carrillo Marín (France) Alizé Lim (Austria) Mira Antonitsch (France) Alice Robbe
January 20	Monastir, Tunisia; Hard; W15; Singles and Doubles Draws	(Kazakhstan) Gozal Ainitdinova; 6–2, 6–4	(Belarus) Yuliya Hatouka	(Finland) Oona Orpana (Czech Republic) Jesika Malečková	(Czech Republic) Miriam Kolodziejová (Slovakia) Tereza Mihalíková (Belarus) Anna Kubareva (China) Zheng Qinwen
January 20	Monastir, Tunisia; Hard; W15; Singles and Doubles Draws	(Belarus) Yuliya Hatouka (Slovakia) Tereza Mihalíková; 6–4, 6–2	(Kazakhstan) Gozal Ainitdinova (Kazakhstan) Yekaterina Dmitrichenko	(Finland) Oona Orpana (Czech Republic) Jesika Malečková	(Czech Republic) Miriam Kolodziejová (Slovakia) Tereza Mihalíková (Belarus) Anna Kubareva (China) Zheng Qinwen
January 20	Antalya, Turkey; Clay; W15; Singles and Doubles Draws	(Russia) Valeriya Olyanovskaya; 6–0, 6–2	(Croatia) Silvia Njirić	(Germany) Anja Wildgruber (Kazakhstan) Zhibek Kulambayeva	(United States) Anastasia Nefedova (China) Ma Yexin (Japan) Honoka Kobayashi (Sweden) Marina Yudanov
January 20	Antalya, Turkey; Clay; W15; Singles and Doubles Draws	(Romania) Georgia Crăciun (Romania) Andreea Prisăcariu; 7–5, 7–5	(Italy) Martina Colmegna (Croatia) Silvia Njirić	(Germany) Anja Wildgruber (Kazakhstan) Zhibek Kulambayeva	(United States) Anastasia Nefedova (China) Ma Yexin (Japan) Honoka Kobayashi (Sweden) Marina Yudanov
January 27	Burnie International; Burnie, Australia; Hard; W60; Singles Draw – Doubles Draw	(Australia) Maddison Inglis; 2–6, 6–3, 7–5	(United States) Sachia Vickery	(Australia) Ivana Popovic (Spain) Paula Badosa	(Japan) Chihiro Muramatsu (Australia) Lizette Cabrera (Australia) Abbie Myers (Russia) Kamilla Rakhimova
January 27	Burnie International; Burnie, Australia; Hard; W60; Singles Draw – Doubles Draw	(Australia) Ellen Perez (Australia) Storm Sanders; 6–3, 6–2	(United States) Desirae Krawczyk (United States) Asia Muhammad	(Australia) Ivana Popovic (Spain) Paula Badosa	(Japan) Chihiro Muramatsu (Australia) Lizette Cabrera (Australia) Abbie Myers (Russia) Kamilla Rakhimova
January 27	Open Andrézieux-Bouthéon 42; Andrézieux-Bouthéon, France; Hard (indoor); W60; Singles Draw – Doubles Draw	(Belgium) Ysaline Bonaventure; 6–4, 7–6^{(7–3)}	(Netherlands) Arantxa Rus	(Belarus) Olga Govortsova (Russia) Natalia Vikhlyantseva	(Serbia) Nina Stojanović (Poland) Magdalena Fręch (Slovakia) Rebecca Šramková (Germany) Anna-Lena Friedsam
January 27	Open Andrézieux-Bouthéon 42; Andrézieux-Bouthéon, France; Hard (indoor); W60; Singles Draw – Doubles Draw	(Romania) Jaqueline Cristian (Romania) Elena-Gabriela Ruse; 7–6^{(8–6)}, 6–7^{(4–7)}, [10–8]	(Georgia (country)) Ekaterine Gorgodze (Cyprus) Raluca Șerban	(Belarus) Olga Govortsova (Russia) Natalia Vikhlyantseva	(Serbia) Nina Stojanović (Poland) Magdalena Fręch (Slovakia) Rebecca Šramková (Germany) Anna-Lena Friedsam
January 27	Nonthaburi, Thailand; Hard; W25; Singles and Doubles Draws	(India) Ankita Raina; 6–3, 7–5	(France) Chloé Paquet	(Switzerland) Leonie Küng (China) Wang Xinyu	(Thailand) Supapitch Kuearum (Switzerland) Simona Waltert (Uzbekistan) Akgul Amanmuradova (Thailand) Patcharin Cheapchandej
January 27	Nonthaburi, Thailand; Hard; W25; Singles and Doubles Draws	(India) Ankita Raina (Netherlands) Bibiane Schoofs; 6–4, 6–2	(Thailand) Supapitch Kuearum (Thailand) Mananchaya Sawangkaew	(Switzerland) Leonie Küng (China) Wang Xinyu	(Thailand) Supapitch Kuearum (Switzerland) Simona Waltert (Uzbekistan) Akgul Amanmuradova (Thailand) Patcharin Cheapchandej
January 27	Cairo, Egypt; Clay; W15; Singles and Doubles Draws	(Russia) Anastasia Zolotareva; 4–6, 6–4, 6–0	(Serbia) Tamara Čurović	(Morocco) Rita Atik (Slovakia) Chantal Škamlová	(Moldova) Vitalia Stamat (Sweden) Fanny Östlund (Russia) Angelika Shapovalova (Netherlands) Annick Melgers
January 27	Cairo, Egypt; Clay; W15; Singles and Doubles Draws	(Serbia) Tamara Čurović (Serbia) Elena Milovanović; 6–2, 2–6, [10–2]	(Russia) Anna Morgina (Russia) Anastasia Zolotareva	(Morocco) Rita Atik (Slovakia) Chantal Škamlová	(Moldova) Vitalia Stamat (Sweden) Fanny Östlund (Russia) Angelika Shapovalova (Netherlands) Annick Melgers
January 27	Cancún, Mexico; Hard; W15; Singles and Doubles Draws	(Brazil) Ingrid Gamarra Martins; 6–3, 6–2	(United States) Taylor Ng	(United States) Alexa Noel (Netherlands) Eva Vedder	(United States) Paige Cline (Brazil) Eduarda Piai (United States) Joelle Kissell (United States) Elyse Lavender
January 27	Cancún, Mexico; Hard; W15; Singles and Doubles Draws	(Italy) Verena Meliss (Belgium) Eliessa Vanlangendonck; 6–2, 6–2	(United States) Hind Abdelouahid (Canada) Stacey Fung	(United States) Alexa Noel (Netherlands) Eva Vedder	(United States) Paige Cline (Brazil) Eduarda Piai (United States) Joelle Kissell (United States) Elyse Lavender
January 27	Manacor, Spain; Hard; W15; Singles and Doubles Draws	(Germany) Mina Hodzic; 6–0, 6–3	(Switzerland) Valentina Ryser	(France) Margot Yerolymos (Russia) Maria Marfutina	(France) Alice Robbe (France) Alizé Lim (Switzerland) Karin Kennel (Italy) Camilla Rosatello
January 27	Manacor, Spain; Hard; W15; Singles and Doubles Draws	(Netherlands) Suzan Lamens (Switzerland) Nina Stadler; 4–6, 6–1, [10–6]	(Russia) Maria Marfutina (Italy) Camilla Rosatello	(France) Margot Yerolymos (Russia) Maria Marfutina	(France) Alice Robbe (France) Alizé Lim (Switzerland) Karin Kennel (Italy) Camilla Rosatello
January 27	Monastir, Tunisia; Hard; W15; Singles and Doubles Draws	(Belarus) Yuliya Hatouka; 6–1, 6–2	(Czech Republic) Jesika Malečková	(Netherlands) Noa Liauw a Fong (Kazakhstan) Gozal Ainitdinova	(Austria) Sinja Kraus (Italy) Federica Rossi (France) Margaux Orange (Italy) Nuria Brancaccio
January 27	Monastir, Tunisia; Hard; W15; Singles and Doubles Draws	(Italy) Nuria Brancaccio (Italy) Federica Rossi; 5–7, 6–3, [10–5]	(Czech Republic) Miriam Kolodziejová (Czech Republic) Jesika Malečková	(Netherlands) Noa Liauw a Fong (Kazakhstan) Gozal Ainitdinova	(Austria) Sinja Kraus (Italy) Federica Rossi (France) Margaux Orange (Italy) Nuria Brancaccio
January 27	Antalya, Turkey; Clay; W15; Singles and Doubles Draws	(Romania) Georgia Crăciun; 2–6, 6–3, 6–3	(Croatia) Tara Würth	(Romania) Andreea Roșca (Greece) Sapfo Sakellaridi	(Romania) Andreea Prisăcariu (Japan) Ayaka Okuno (Germany) Anja Wildgruber (Italy) Aurora Zantedeschi
January 27	Antalya, Turkey; Clay; W15; Singles and Doubles Draws	(Kazakhstan) Zhibek Kulambayeva (China) Ma Yexin; 6–4, 1–6, [10–4]	(Japan) Ayaka Okuno (Germany) Julyette Steur	(Romania) Andreea Roșca (Greece) Sapfo Sakellaridi	(Romania) Andreea Prisăcariu (Japan) Ayaka Okuno (Germany) Anja Wildgruber (Italy) Aurora Zantedeschi

=== February ===
Week of	Tournament	Winner	Runners-up	Semifinalists	Quarterfinalists
February 3	Dow Tennis Classic; Midland, United States; Hard (indoor); W100; Singles Draw – Doubles Draw	(United States) Shelby Rogers; Walkover	(Ukraine) Anhelina Kalinina	(United States) Irina Falconi (United States) Jamie Loeb	(Romania) Gabriela Talabă (Belgium) Yanina Wickmayer (United States) Catherine Harrison (United States) Caty McNally
February 3	Dow Tennis Classic; Midland, United States; Hard (indoor); W100; Singles Draw – Doubles Draw	(United States) Caroline Dolehide (United States) Maria Sanchez; 6–3, 6–4	(Russia) Valeria Savinykh (Belgium) Yanina Wickmayer	(United States) Irina Falconi (United States) Jamie Loeb	(Romania) Gabriela Talabă (Belgium) Yanina Wickmayer (United States) Catherine Harrison (United States) Caty McNally
February 3	Launceston International; Launceston, Australia; Hard; W25; Singles and Doubles Draws	(United States) Asia Muhammad; 6–4, 6–3	(Australia) Destanee Aiava	(Japan) Ayano Shimizu (United States) Sachia Vickery	(Hungary) Fanny Stollár (Australia) Abbie Myers (Japan) Naho Sato (Australia) Amber Marshall
February 3	Launceston International; Launceston, Australia; Hard; W25; Singles and Doubles Draws	(Australia) Alison Bai (Australia) Jaimee Fourlis; 7–6^{(7–4)}, 6–3	(Australia) Alicia Smith (Papua New Guinea) Abigail Tere-Apisah	(Japan) Ayano Shimizu (United States) Sachia Vickery	(Hungary) Fanny Stollár (Australia) Abbie Myers (Japan) Naho Sato (Australia) Amber Marshall
February 3	Trnava, Slovakia; Hard; W25; Singles and Doubles Draws	(Russia) Sofya Lansere; 6–2, 6–3	(North Macedonia) Lina Gjorcheska	(Russia) Victoria Kan (Russia) Vlada Koval	(Cyprus) Raluca Șerban (Russia) Irina Khromacheva (Romania) Alexandra Cadanțu (Slovakia) Kristína Kučová
February 3	Trnava, Slovakia; Hard; W25; Singles and Doubles Draws	(Czech Republic) Miriam Kolodziejová (Romania) Laura Ioana Paar; 6–1, 6–1	(Russia) Victoria Kan (Ukraine) Ganna Poznikhirenko	(Russia) Victoria Kan (Russia) Vlada Koval	(Cyprus) Raluca Șerban (Russia) Irina Khromacheva (Romania) Alexandra Cadanțu (Slovakia) Kristína Kučová
February 3	Nonthaburi, Thailand; Hard; W25; Singles and Doubles Draws	(Romania) Irina Fetecău; 6–3, 0–0 ret.	(Romania) Patricia Maria Țig	(United Kingdom) Jodie Burrage (Poland) Katarzyna Kawa	(Thailand) Peangtarn Plipuech (Romania) Nicoleta Dascălu (Netherlands) Bibiane Schoofs (Switzerland) Leonie Küng
February 3	Nonthaburi, Thailand; Hard; W25; Singles and Doubles Draws	(India) Ankita Raina (Netherlands) Bibiane Schoofs; 6–2, 3–6, [10–7]	(Japan) Miyabi Inoue (China) Kang Jiaqi	(United Kingdom) Jodie Burrage (Poland) Katarzyna Kawa	(Thailand) Peangtarn Plipuech (Romania) Nicoleta Dascălu (Netherlands) Bibiane Schoofs (Switzerland) Leonie Küng
February 3	Cancún, Mexico; Hard; W15; Singles and Doubles Draws	(Brazil) Ingrid Gamarra Martins; 6–7^{(4–7)}, 7–5, 6–4	(Italy) Verena Meliss	(Brazil) Nathaly Kurata (United States) Dasha Ivanova	(Brazil) Thaisa Grana Pedretti (Germany) Silvia Ambrosio (Japan) Mayuka Aikawa (Brazil) Eduarda Piai
February 3	Cancún, Mexico; Hard; W15; Singles and Doubles Draws	(Brazil) Ingrid Gamarra Martins (Brazil) Thaisa Grana Pedretti; 6–2, 6–2	(Bulgaria) Eleonore Tchakarova (Bulgaria) Verginie Tchakarova	(Brazil) Nathaly Kurata (United States) Dasha Ivanova	(Brazil) Thaisa Grana Pedretti (Germany) Silvia Ambrosio (Japan) Mayuka Aikawa (Brazil) Eduarda Piai
February 3	Palma Nova, Spain; Clay; W15; Singles and Doubles Draws	(Czech Republic) Anna Sisková; 6–3, 6–1	(Spain) Alba Rey García	(Spain) Yvonne Cavallé Reimers (Spain) Lucía Cortez Llorca	(Spain) Ángela Fita Boluda (Spain) María Gutiérrez Carrasco (Spain) Gemma Lairón Navarro (Russia) Daria Krasnova
February 3	Palma Nova, Spain; Clay; W15; Singles and Doubles Draws	(Spain) Yvonne Cavallé Reimers (Spain) Ángela Fita Boluda; 6–2, 7–6^{(7–5)}	(Spain) Celia Cerviño Ruiz (Spain) María Gutiérrez Carrasco	(Spain) Yvonne Cavallé Reimers (Spain) Lucía Cortez Llorca	(Spain) Ángela Fita Boluda (Spain) María Gutiérrez Carrasco (Spain) Gemma Lairón Navarro (Russia) Daria Krasnova
February 3	Monastir, Tunisia; Hard; W15; Singles and Doubles Draws	(Russia) Maria Timofeeva; 7–5, 6–4	(Switzerland) Karin Kennel	(France) Margaux Orange (Switzerland) Arlinda Rushiti	(Spain) Júlia Payola (Spain) Lucía Llinares (Spain) Jéssica Bouzas Maneiro (Switzerland) Sebastianna Scilipoti
February 3	Monastir, Tunisia; Hard; W15; Singles and Doubles Draws	(Russia) Anastasia Pribylova (Russia) Anastasia Tikhonova; 5–7, 7–6^{(7–4)}, [10–4]	(Germany) Katharina Hering (Germany) Lisa Ponomar	(France) Margaux Orange (Switzerland) Arlinda Rushiti	(Spain) Júlia Payola (Spain) Lucía Llinares (Spain) Jéssica Bouzas Maneiro (Switzerland) Sebastianna Scilipoti
February 3	Antalya, Turkey; Clay; W15; Singles and Doubles Draws	(Romania) Andreea Roșca; 6–4, 7–5	(United States) Anastasia Nefedova	(Germany) Natalia Siedliska (Kazakhstan) Zhibek Kulambayeva	(Germany) Julyette Steur (Croatia) Oleksandra Oliynykova (Italy) Federica Arcidiacono (Greece) Sapfo Sakellaridi
February 3	Antalya, Turkey; Clay; W15; Singles and Doubles Draws	(China) Han Jiangxue (Japan) Ayaka Okuno; 4–6, 6–3, [14–12]	(Germany) Natalia Siedliska (Germany) Julyette Steur	(Germany) Natalia Siedliska (Kazakhstan) Zhibek Kulambayeva	(Germany) Julyette Steur (Croatia) Oleksandra Oliynykova (Italy) Federica Arcidiacono (Greece) Sapfo Sakellaridi
February 10	Zed Tennis Open; Cairo, Egypt; Hard; W100; Singles Draw – Doubles Draw	(Romania) Irina-Camelia Begu; 6–4, 3–6, 6–2	(Ukraine) Lesia Tsurenko	(Netherlands) Arantxa Rus (Spain) Aliona Bolsova	(Japan) Kurumi Nara (Spain) Lara Arruabarrena (Russia) Anastasia Gasanova (Italy) Martina Trevisan
February 10	Zed Tennis Open; Cairo, Egypt; Hard; W100; Singles Draw – Doubles Draw	(Serbia) Aleksandra Krunić (Poland) Katarzyna Piter; 6–4, 6–2	(Netherlands) Arantxa Rus (Egypt) Mayar Sherif	(Netherlands) Arantxa Rus (Spain) Aliona Bolsova	(Japan) Kurumi Nara (Spain) Lara Arruabarrena (Russia) Anastasia Gasanova (Italy) Martina Trevisan
February 10	Kentucky Open; Nicholasville, United States; Hard (indoor); W100; Singles Draw – Doubles Draw	(Belarus) Olga Govortsova; 6–4, 6–4	(United States) Claire Liu	(Canada) Françoise Abanda (United States) Madison Brengle	(Czech Republic) Marie Bouzková (Romania) Gabriela Talabă (Belgium) Yanina Wickmayer (Germany) Mona Barthel
February 10	Kentucky Open; Nicholasville, United States; Hard (indoor); W100; Singles Draw – Doubles Draw	(United States) Quinn Gleason (United States) Catherine Harrison; 7–5, 6–2	(United States) Hailey Baptiste (United States) Whitney Osuigwe	(Canada) Françoise Abanda (United States) Madison Brengle	(Czech Republic) Marie Bouzková (Romania) Gabriela Talabă (Belgium) Yanina Wickmayer (Germany) Mona Barthel
February 10	Grenoble, France; Hard (indoor); W25; Singles and Doubles Draws	(France) Clara Burel; 5–7, 7–5, 6–2	(Luxembourg) Eléonora Molinaro	(France) Harmony Tan (United Kingdom) Katie Boulter	(Switzerland) Susan Bandecchi (France) Amandine Hesse (France) Elsa Jacquemot (France) Gaëlle Desperrier
February 10	Grenoble, France; Hard (indoor); W25; Singles and Doubles Draws	(France) Amandine Hesse (France) Elixane Lechemia; 6–3, 4–6, [13–11]	(United Kingdom) Samantha Murray Sharan (Germany) Julia Wachaczyk	(France) Harmony Tan (United Kingdom) Katie Boulter	(Switzerland) Susan Bandecchi (France) Amandine Hesse (France) Elsa Jacquemot (France) Gaëlle Desperrier
February 10	Trnava, Slovakia; Hard; W25; Singles and Doubles Draws	(Romania) Jaqueline Cristian; 6–1, 4–2, ret.	(Russia) Sofya Lansere	(Russia) Victoria Kan (Croatia) Jana Fett	(Bosnia and Herzegovina) Dea Herdželaš (Austria) Julia Grabher (Czech Republic) Lucie Hradecká (Russia) Irina Khromacheva
February 10	Trnava, Slovakia; Hard; W25; Singles and Doubles Draws	(Hungary) Anna Bondár (Slovakia) Tereza Mihalíková; 6–4, 6–4	(Russia) Amina Anshba (Czech Republic) Anastasia Dețiuc	(Russia) Victoria Kan (Croatia) Jana Fett	(Bosnia and Herzegovina) Dea Herdželaš (Austria) Julia Grabher (Czech Republic) Lucie Hradecká (Russia) Irina Khromacheva
February 10	Heraklion, Greece; Clay; W15; Singles and Doubles Draws	(Italy) Martina Spigarelli; 6–2, 6–2	(Italy) Martina Colmegna	(Malta) Helene Pellicano (Germany) Romy Kölzer	(Russia) Polina Leykina (Netherlands) Lara Panfilov (Italy) Dalila Spiteri (Denmark) Olga Helmi
February 10	Heraklion, Greece; Clay; W15; Singles and Doubles Draws	(Italy) Martina Colmegna (Italy) Dalila Spiteri; 4–6, 6–0, [10–6]	(Romania) Ioana Gașpar (Germany) Romy Kölzer	(Malta) Helene Pellicano (Germany) Romy Kölzer	(Russia) Polina Leykina (Netherlands) Lara Panfilov (Italy) Dalila Spiteri (Denmark) Olga Helmi
February 10	Cancún, Mexico; Hard; W15; Singles and Doubles Draws	(Argentina) María Lourdes Carlé; 6–4, 6–0	(United States) Dasha Ivanova	(Brazil) Thaisa Grana Pedretti (France) Léolia Jeanjean	(Brazil) Eduarda Piai (Japan) Mayuka Aikawa (United States) Alexandra Yepifanova (United States) Vanessa Ong
February 10	Cancún, Mexico; Hard; W15; Singles and Doubles Draws	(Brazil) Carolina Alves (Venezuela) Andrea Gámiz; 5–7, 6–2, [11–9]	(France) Tiphanie Fiquet (France) Léolia Jeanjean	(Brazil) Thaisa Grana Pedretti (France) Léolia Jeanjean	(Brazil) Eduarda Piai (Japan) Mayuka Aikawa (United States) Alexandra Yepifanova (United States) Vanessa Ong
February 10	Hamilton, New Zealand; Hard; W15; Singles and Doubles Draws	(Japan) Eri Shimizu; 6–4, 0–6, 6–3	(South Korea) Park So-hyun	(New Zealand) Katherine Westbury (New Zealand) Emily Fanning	(Israel) Tamara Barad Itzhaki (New Zealand) Vivian Yang (Hong Kong) Maggie Ng (United States) Sabastiani León
February 10	Hamilton, New Zealand; Hard; W15; Singles and Doubles Draws	(New Zealand) Emily Fanning (New Zealand) Erin Routliffe; 6–3, 6–1	(United States) Sabastiani León (Hong Kong) Maggie Ng	(New Zealand) Katherine Westbury (New Zealand) Emily Fanning	(Israel) Tamara Barad Itzhaki (New Zealand) Vivian Yang (Hong Kong) Maggie Ng (United States) Sabastiani León
February 10	Monastir, Tunisia; Hard; W15; Singles and Doubles Draws	(Romania) Ilona Ghioroaie; 7–5, 6–1	(Russia) Maria Timofeeva	(Russia) Anastasia Tikhonova (Belarus) Anhelina Kalita	(United Kingdom) Gabriella Taylor (Germany) Vivian Wolff (Sweden) Jacqueline Cabaj Awad (United Kingdom) Eliz Maloney
February 10	Monastir, Tunisia; Hard; W15; Singles and Doubles Draws	(France) Mylène Halemai (France) Manon Léonard; 1–6, 6–3, [10–6]	(Romania) Ilona Ghioroaie (Russia) Anastasia Pribylova	(Russia) Anastasia Tikhonova (Belarus) Anhelina Kalita	(United Kingdom) Gabriella Taylor (Germany) Vivian Wolff (Sweden) Jacqueline Cabaj Awad (United Kingdom) Eliz Maloney
February 10	Antalya, Turkey; Clay; W15; Singles and Doubles Draws	(Germany) Julyette Steur; 6–3, 4–6, 6–4	(China) Han Jiangxue	(Russia) Elina Avanesyan (Bosnia and Herzegovina) Anita Husarić	(Switzerland) Nina Stadler (Japan) Anri Nagata (Turkey) Melis Sezer (Latvia) Margarita Ignatjeva
February 10	Antalya, Turkey; Clay; W15; Singles and Doubles Draws	Doubles competition was cancelled due to poor weather conditions		(Russia) Elina Avanesyan (Bosnia and Herzegovina) Anita Husarić	(Switzerland) Nina Stadler (Japan) Anri Nagata (Turkey) Melis Sezer (Latvia) Margarita Ignatjeva
February 17	Zed Tennis Open II; Cairo, Egypt; Hard; W60; Singles Draw – Doubles Draw	(Ukraine) Marta Kostyuk; 6–1, 6–0	(Spain) Aliona Bolsova	(Croatia) Tereza Mrdeža (Ukraine) Daria Snigur	(Russia) Vitalia Diatchenko (Russia) Victoria Kan (Romania) Elena-Gabriela Ruse (Bulgaria) Isabella Shinikova
February 17	Zed Tennis Open II; Cairo, Egypt; Hard; W60; Singles Draw – Doubles Draw	(Ukraine) Marta Kostyuk (Russia) Kamilla Rakhimova; 6–3, 2–6, [10–6]	(Poland) Paula Kania (Ukraine) Anastasiya Shoshyna	(Croatia) Tereza Mrdeža (Ukraine) Daria Snigur	(Russia) Vitalia Diatchenko (Russia) Victoria Kan (Romania) Elena-Gabriela Ruse (Bulgaria) Isabella Shinikova
February 17	Shimadzu All Japan Indoor Tennis Championships; Kyoto, Japan; Hard (indoor); W60; Singles Draw – Doubles Draw	(China) Xun Fangying; 3–6, 6–3, 7–6^{(8–6)}	(Netherlands) Indy de Vroome	(China) Wang Xinyu (Japan) Erina Hayashi	(Japan) Ayano Shimizu (China) Kang Jiaqi (Japan) Akiko Omae (Japan) Risa Ushijima
February 17	Shimadzu All Japan Indoor Tennis Championships; Kyoto, Japan; Hard (indoor); W60; Singles Draw – Doubles Draw	(Japan) Erina Hayashi (Japan) Moyuka Uchijima; 7–5, 5–7, [10–6]	(Chinese Taipei) Hsieh Yu-chieh (Japan) Minori Yonehara	(China) Wang Xinyu (Japan) Erina Hayashi	(Japan) Ayano Shimizu (China) Kang Jiaqi (Japan) Akiko Omae (Japan) Risa Ushijima
February 17	Perth, Australia; Hard; W25; Singles and Doubles Draws	(Australia) Maddison Inglis; 6–4, 7–6^{(7–4)}	(Australia) Destanee Aiava	(Japan) Shiho Akita (Papua New Guinea) Abigail Tere-Apisah	(Switzerland) Leonie Küng (France) Irina Ramialison (United States) Asia Muhammad (Japan) Sakura Hosogi
February 17	Perth, Australia; Hard; W25; Singles and Doubles Draws	(Japan) Kanako Morisaki (Japan) Erika Sema; 7–5, 6–4	(Australia) Jaimee Fourlis (New Zealand) Erin Routliffe	(Japan) Shiho Akita (Papua New Guinea) Abigail Tere-Apisah	(Switzerland) Leonie Küng (France) Irina Ramialison (United States) Asia Muhammad (Japan) Sakura Hosogi
February 17	Jodhpur, India; Hard; W25; Singles and Doubles Draws	(India) Ankita Raina; 7–5, 6–1	(Turkey) Berfu Cengiz	(Thailand) Nudnida Luangnam (United Kingdom) Francesca Jones	(India) Riya Bhatia (India) Rutuja Bhosale (Japan) Miyabi Inoue (United Kingdom) Jodie Burrage
February 17	Jodhpur, India; Hard; W25; Singles and Doubles Draws	(India) Rutuja Bhosale (Japan) Miyabi Inoue; 4–6, 6–4, [10–8]	(India) Snehal Mane (India) Ankita Raina	(Thailand) Nudnida Luangnam (United Kingdom) Francesca Jones	(India) Riya Bhatia (India) Rutuja Bhosale (Japan) Miyabi Inoue (United Kingdom) Jodie Burrage
February 17	GB Pro-Series Glasgow; Glasgow, United Kingdom; Hard (indoor); W25; Singles and Doubles Draws	(Denmark) Clara Tauson; 6–4, 6–0	(Bulgaria) Viktoriya Tomova	(Belgium) Marie Benoît (France) Clara Burel	(Spain) Nuria Párrizas Díaz (Croatia) Jana Fett (France) Margot Yerolymos (Romania) Laura Ioana Paar
February 17	GB Pro-Series Glasgow; Glasgow, United Kingdom; Hard (indoor); W25; Singles and Doubles Draws	(France) Myrtille Georges (Belgium) Kimberley Zimmermann; 7–6^{(7–2)}, 7–6^{(7–5)}	(Belgium) Lara Salden (Denmark) Clara Tauson	(Belgium) Marie Benoît (France) Clara Burel	(Spain) Nuria Párrizas Díaz (Croatia) Jana Fett (France) Margot Yerolymos (Romania) Laura Ioana Paar
February 17	Heraklion, Greece; Clay; W15; Singles and Doubles Draws	(Italy) Dalila Spiteri; 6–4, 6–1	(Italy) Martina Spigarelli	(Russia) Polina Leykina (Romania) Arina Vasilescu	(Italy) Tatiana Pieri (Slovakia) Laura Svatíková (France) Margaux Rouvroy (United States) Chiara Scholl
February 17	Heraklion, Greece; Clay; W15; Singles and Doubles Draws	(Italy) Tatiana Pieri (Italy) Dalila Spiteri; 7–6^{(7–3)}, 6–1	(Italy) Nuria Brancaccio (Denmark) Olga Helmi	(Russia) Polina Leykina (Romania) Arina Vasilescu	(Italy) Tatiana Pieri (Slovakia) Laura Svatíková (France) Margaux Rouvroy (United States) Chiara Scholl
February 17	Cancún, Mexico; Hard; W15; Singles and Doubles Draws	(Venezuela) Andrea Gámiz; 6–7^{(5–7)}, 7–5, 6–0	(Brazil) Carolina Alves	(Brazil) Thaisa Grana Pedretti (Argentina) María Lourdes Carlé	(Argentina) Eugenia Ganga (France) Léolia Jeanjean (Serbia) Katarina Kozarov (Switzerland) Joanne Züger
February 17	Cancún, Mexico; Hard; W15; Singles and Doubles Draws	(Argentina) María Lourdes Carlé (Brazil) Thaisa Grana Pedretti; Walkover	(United States) Kendra Bunch (Serbia) Katarina Kozarov	(Brazil) Thaisa Grana Pedretti (Argentina) María Lourdes Carlé	(Argentina) Eugenia Ganga (France) Léolia Jeanjean (Serbia) Katarina Kozarov (Switzerland) Joanne Züger
February 17	Monastir, Tunisia; Hard; W15; Singles and Doubles Draws	(France) Carole Monnet; 4–6, 6–1, 6–2	(Switzerland) Valentina Ryser	(Latvia) Daniela Vismane (Hong Kong) Adithya Karunaratne	(United Kingdom) Gabriella Taylor (Netherlands) Noa Liauw a Fong (Sweden) Jacqueline Cabaj Awad (Russia) Maria Bondarenko
February 17	Monastir, Tunisia; Hard; W15; Singles and Doubles Draws	(France) Julie Belgraver (France) Mylène Halemai; 2–6, 6–1, [10–4]	(Bulgaria) Petia Arshinkova (Bulgaria) Gergana Topalova	(Latvia) Daniela Vismane (Hong Kong) Adithya Karunaratne	(United Kingdom) Gabriella Taylor (Netherlands) Noa Liauw a Fong (Sweden) Jacqueline Cabaj Awad (Russia) Maria Bondarenko
February 17	Antalya, Turkey; Clay; W15; Singles and Doubles Draws	(Slovenia) Nina Potočnik; 6–3, 6–2	(Bulgaria) Julia Stamatova	(Colombia) María Herazo González (Colombia) Yuliana Lizarazo	(Greece) Sapfo Sakellaridi (Croatia) Silvia Njirić (United States) Anastasia Nefedova (Ukraine) Liubov Kostenko
February 17	Antalya, Turkey; Clay; W15; Singles and Doubles Draws	(Colombia) Yuliana Lizarazo (Italy) Aurora Zantedeschi; 6–2, 5–7, [10–4]	(China) Guo Meiqi (China) Han Jiangxue	(Colombia) María Herazo González (Colombia) Yuliana Lizarazo	(Greece) Sapfo Sakellaridi (Croatia) Silvia Njirić (United States) Anastasia Nefedova (Ukraine) Liubov Kostenko
February 24	Perth, Australia; Hard; W25; Singles and Doubles Draws	(Japan) Shiho Akita; 6–3, 6–3	(France) Irina Ramialison	(United States) Jennifer Elie (Australia) Destanee Aiava	(Papua New Guinea) Abigail Tere-Apisah (South Korea) Park So-hyun (United States) Asia Muhammad (Switzerland) Leonie Küng
February 24	Perth, Australia; Hard; W25; Singles and Doubles Draws	(Japan) Kanako Morisaki (Japan) Erika Sema; 6–1, 4–6, [10–7]	(New Zealand) Paige Hourigan (Papua New Guinea) Abigail Tere-Apisah	(United States) Jennifer Elie (Australia) Destanee Aiava	(Papua New Guinea) Abigail Tere-Apisah (South Korea) Park So-hyun (United States) Asia Muhammad (Switzerland) Leonie Küng
February 24	Mâcon, France; Hard (indoor); W25; Singles and Doubles Draws	(France) Océane Dodin; 3–6, 6–1, 6–3	(France) Jessika Ponchet	(France) Harmony Tan (Belarus) Vera Lapko	(Romania) Jaqueline Cristian (France) Myrtille Georges (Latvia) Diāna Marcinkēviča (France) Margot Yerolymos
February 24	Mâcon, France; Hard (indoor); W25; Singles and Doubles Draws	(France) Audrey Albié (France) Marine Partaud; 3–6, 7–6^{(7–3)}, [12–10]	(Romania) Miriam Bulgaru (France) Estelle Cascino	(France) Harmony Tan (Belarus) Vera Lapko	(Romania) Jaqueline Cristian (France) Myrtille Georges (Latvia) Diāna Marcinkēviča (France) Margot Yerolymos
February 24	Altenkirchen, Germany; Carpet (indoor); W25; Singles and Doubles Draws	(Germany) Eva Lys; 6–2, 6–4	(Netherlands) Bibiane Schoofs	(Switzerland) Arlinda Rushiti (Switzerland) Susan Bandecchi	(Czech Republic) Linda Fruhvirtová (Germany) Anna Zaja (Romania) Andreea Mitu (Romania) Laura Ioana Paar
February 24	Altenkirchen, Germany; Carpet (indoor); W25; Singles and Doubles Draws	(Romania) Andreea Mitu (Romania) Laura Ioana Paar; 7–5, 6–2	(United Kingdom) Anna Popescu (United States) Chiara Scholl	(Switzerland) Arlinda Rushiti (Switzerland) Susan Bandecchi	(Czech Republic) Linda Fruhvirtová (Germany) Anna Zaja (Romania) Andreea Mitu (Romania) Laura Ioana Paar
February 24	Moscow, Russia; Hard (indoor); W25; Singles and Doubles Draws	(Russia) Ekaterina Kazionova; 6–4, 1–6, 7–6^{(7–5)}	(Russia) Kamilla Rakhimova	(Russia) Anastasia Zakharova (Russia) Taisya Pachkaleva	(Belarus) Yuliya Hatouka (Russia) Alina Charaeva (Germany) Vivian Heisen (Greece) Valentini Grammatikopoulou
February 24	Moscow, Russia; Hard (indoor); W25; Singles and Doubles Draws	(Russia) Sofya Lansere (Russia) Kamilla Rakhimova; 6–1, 3–6, [10–6]	(Russia) Natela Dzalamidze (Greece) Valentini Grammatikopoulou	(Russia) Anastasia Zakharova (Russia) Taisya Pachkaleva	(Belarus) Yuliya Hatouka (Russia) Alina Charaeva (Germany) Vivian Heisen (Greece) Valentini Grammatikopoulou
February 24	Sunderland, United Kingdom; Hard (indoor); W25; Singles and Doubles Draws	(Bulgaria) Viktoriya Tomova; 4–6, 6–4, 6–3	(United Kingdom) Emma Raducanu	(United Kingdom) Samantha Murray Sharan (Denmark) Clara Tauson	(Croatia) Jana Fett (France) Amandine Hesse (Turkey) Pemra Özgen (Netherlands) Richèl Hogenkamp
February 24	Sunderland, United Kingdom; Hard (indoor); W25; Singles and Doubles Draws	(United Kingdom) Alicia Barnett (United Kingdom) Olivia Nicholls; 6–4, 7–6^{(8–6)}	(Spain) Celia Cerviño Ruiz (Spain) María Gutiérrez Carrasco	(United Kingdom) Samantha Murray Sharan (Denmark) Clara Tauson	(Croatia) Jana Fett (France) Amandine Hesse (Turkey) Pemra Özgen (Netherlands) Richèl Hogenkamp
February 24	Rancho Santa Fe, United States; Hard; W25; Singles and Doubles Draws	(China) You Xiaodi; 6–4, 7–6^{(7–5)}	(Slovakia) Rebecca Šramková	(Belgium) Yanina Wickmayer (United States) Hailey Baptiste	(United States) Jamie Loeb (France) Diane Parry (Canada) Françoise Abanda (Serbia) Olga Danilović
February 24	Rancho Santa Fe, United States; Hard; W25; Singles and Doubles Draws	(United States) Kayla Day (United States) Sophia Whittle; 6–2, 5–7, [10–7]	(Hong Kong) Eudice Chong (China) You Xiaodi	(Belgium) Yanina Wickmayer (United States) Hailey Baptiste	(United States) Jamie Loeb (France) Diane Parry (Canada) Françoise Abanda (Serbia) Olga Danilović
February 24	Heraklion, Greece; Clay; W15; Singles and Doubles Draws	(Russia) Darya Astakhova; 1–6, 6–4, 6–2	(Romania) Arina Vasilescu	(Spain) Noelia Bouzó Zanotti (Romania) Andreea Roșca	(Romania) Oana Gavrilă (Russia) Polina Leykina (Italy) Federica Rossi (Spain) Rebeka Masarova
February 24	Heraklion, Greece; Clay; W15; Singles and Doubles Draws	(Romania) Oana Gavrilă (Romania) Andreea Roșca; 6–3, 4–6, [10–7]	(Czech Republic) Miriam Kolodziejová (Slovakia) Chantal Škamlová	(Spain) Noelia Bouzó Zanotti (Romania) Andreea Roșca	(Romania) Oana Gavrilă (Russia) Polina Leykina (Italy) Federica Rossi (Spain) Rebeka Masarova
February 24	Monastir, Tunisia; Hard; W15; Singles and Doubles Draws	(Bosnia and Herzegovina) Nefisa Berberović; 6–1, 3–6, 6–3	(France) Alice Ramé	(France) Giulia Morlet (France) Carole Monnet	(United States) Taylor Ng (Netherlands) Noa Liauw a Fong (Bulgaria) Gergana Topalova (Sweden) Jacqueline Cabaj Awad
February 24	Monastir, Tunisia; Hard; W15; Singles and Doubles Draws	(France) Mylène Halemai (Romania) Andreea Prisăcariu; 6–3, 6–4	(Bulgaria) Petia Arshinkova (Bulgaria) Gergana Topalova	(France) Giulia Morlet (France) Carole Monnet	(United States) Taylor Ng (Netherlands) Noa Liauw a Fong (Bulgaria) Gergana Topalova (Sweden) Jacqueline Cabaj Awad
February 24	Antalya, Turkey; Clay; W15; Singles and Doubles Draws	(Luxembourg) Eléonora Molinaro; 6–2, 6–2	(Turkey) Zeynep Sönmez	(China) Han Jiangxue (Turkey) İpek Öz	(Belgium) Eliessa Vanlangendonck (Colombia) María Herazo González (Norway) Melanie Stokke (Slovenia) Nina Potočnik
February 24	Antalya, Turkey; Clay; W15; Singles and Doubles Draws	(Kazakhstan) Gozal Ainitdinova (Georgia (country)) Zoziya Kardava; 6–7^{(4–7)}, 7–6^{(7–1)}, [12–10]	(Colombia) María Herazo González (Colombia) Yuliana Lizarazo	(China) Han Jiangxue (Turkey) İpek Öz	(Belgium) Eliessa Vanlangendonck (Colombia) María Herazo González (Norway) Melanie Stokke (Slovenia) Nina Potočnik

=== March ===
Week of	Tournament	Winner	Runners-up	Semifinalists	Quarterfinalists
March 2	Mildura, Australia; Grass; W25; Singles and Doubles Draws	(Ukraine) Marianna Zakarlyuk; 7–6^{(7–2)}, 6–1	(Japan) Misaki Matsuda	(Australia) Arina Rodionova (Australia) Sara Tomic	(Japan) Nagi Hanatani (France) Irina Ramialison (Australia) Abbie Myers (Switzerland) Leonie Küng
March 2	Mildura, Australia; Grass; W25; Singles and Doubles Draws	(Slovakia) Tereza Mihalíková (Australia) Abbie Myers; 6–3, 6–2	(Australia) Arina Rodionova (New Zealand) Erin Routliffe	(Australia) Arina Rodionova (Australia) Sara Tomic	(Japan) Nagi Hanatani (France) Irina Ramialison (Australia) Abbie Myers (Switzerland) Leonie Küng
March 2	Keio Challenger; Yokohama, Japan; Hard; W25; Singles and Doubles Draws	(Japan) Yuriko Lily Miyazaki; 7–5, 5–7, 6–2	(Japan) Mai Hontama	(Japan) Haruka Kaji (Japan) Ayumi Hirata	(Japan) Shiho Akita (Japan) Mei Yamaguchi (China) Ma Yexin (Netherlands) Indy de Vroome
March 2	Keio Challenger; Yokohama, Japan; Hard; W25; Singles and Doubles Draws	(Japan) Robu Kajitani (Japan) Naho Sato; 1–6, 6–4, [10–8]	(Japan) Erina Hayashi (Japan) Kanako Morisaki	(Japan) Haruka Kaji (Japan) Ayumi Hirata	(Japan) Shiho Akita (Japan) Mei Yamaguchi (China) Ma Yexin (Netherlands) Indy de Vroome
March 2	Potchefstroom, South Africa; Hard; W25; Singles and Doubles Draws	(United Kingdom) Samantha Murray Sharan; 2–6, 6–2, 6–4	(Russia) Marina Melnikova	(United Kingdom) Katy Dunne (Israel) Deniz Khazaniuk	(South Africa) Chanel Simmonds (Switzerland) Joanne Züger (France) Amandine Hesse (Russia) Daria Mishina
March 2	Potchefstroom, South Africa; Hard; W25; Singles and Doubles Draws	(United Kingdom) Samantha Murray Sharan (Hungary) Fanny Stollár; 6–1, 6–1	(Turkey) Berfu Cengiz (New Zealand) Paige Hourigan	(United Kingdom) Katy Dunne (Israel) Deniz Khazaniuk	(South Africa) Chanel Simmonds (Switzerland) Joanne Züger (France) Amandine Hesse (Russia) Daria Mishina
March 2	Antalya, Turkey; Clay; W25; Singles and Doubles Draws	(Egypt) Mayar Sherif; 6–4, 6–3	(Hungary) Dalma Gálfi	(Spain) Andrea Lázaro García (Russia) Amina Anshba	(Russia) Victoria Kan (Kazakhstan) Gozal Ainitdinova (Greece) Despina Papamichail (Czech Republic) Jesika Malečková
March 2	Antalya, Turkey; Clay; W25; Singles and Doubles Draws	(Hungary) Réka Luca Jani (Egypt) Mayar Sherif; 6–7^{(8–10)}, 6–1, [10–3]	(Turkey) İpek Öz (Turkey) Melis Sezer	(Spain) Andrea Lázaro García (Russia) Amina Anshba	(Russia) Victoria Kan (Kazakhstan) Gozal Ainitdinova (Greece) Despina Papamichail (Czech Republic) Jesika Malečková
March 2	Las Vegas, United States; Hard; W25; Singles and Doubles Draws	(United States) Robin Montgomery; 2–6, 6–3, 6–4	(China) You Xiaodi	(France) Diane Parry (Canada) Katherine Sebov	(United States) Sophia Whittle (United States) Alexa Glatch (Serbia) Jovana Jović (Colombia) Emiliana Arango
March 2	Las Vegas, United States; Hard; W25; Singles and Doubles Draws	(United States) Lorraine Guillermo (United States) Maegan Manasse; 0–6, 6–2, [10–4]	(Serbia) Jovana Jović (Switzerland) Conny Perrin	(France) Diane Parry (Canada) Katherine Sebov	(United States) Sophia Whittle (United States) Alexa Glatch (Serbia) Jovana Jović (Colombia) Emiliana Arango
March 2	Cairo, Egypt; Hard; W15; Singles and Doubles Draws	(Egypt) Sandra Samir; 5–7, 7–6^{(9–7)}, 6–2	(India) Zeel Desai	(Slovakia) Barbora Matúšová (Russia) Valeriya Yushchenko	(Italy) Elisa Andrea Camerano (France) Caroline Roméo (China) Wang Meiling (Russia) Anastasia Zolotareva
March 2	Cairo, Egypt; Hard; W15; Singles and Doubles Draws	(Sweden) Jacqueline Cabaj Awad (Egypt) Sandra Samir; 7–5, 6–2	(India) Zeel Desai (Poland) Stefania Rogozińska Dzik	(Slovakia) Barbora Matúšová (Russia) Valeriya Yushchenko	(Italy) Elisa Andrea Camerano (France) Caroline Roméo (China) Wang Meiling (Russia) Anastasia Zolotareva
March 2	Heraklion, Greece; Clay; W15; Singles and Doubles Draws	(Czech Republic) Miriam Kolodziejová; 6–4, 6–4	(Spain) Rebeka Masarova	(Germany) Romy Kölzer (Slovakia) Chantal Škamlová	(Romania) Andreea Roșca (Italy) Corinna Dentoni (Russia) Noel Saidenova (Croatia) Oleksandra Oliynykova
March 2	Heraklion, Greece; Clay; W15; Singles and Doubles Draws	(Serbia) Tamara Čurović (Sweden) Fanny Östlund; 6–4, 7–5	(Romania) Ioana Gașpar (Spain) Rebeka Masarova	(Germany) Romy Kölzer (Slovakia) Chantal Škamlová	(Romania) Andreea Roșca (Italy) Corinna Dentoni (Russia) Noel Saidenova (Croatia) Oleksandra Oliynykova
March 2	Monastir, Tunisia; Hard; W15; Singles and Doubles Draws	(Bosnia and Herzegovina) Nefisa Berberović; 6–2, 6–0	(Sweden) Susanne Celik	(Switzerland) Jenny Dürst (Czech Republic) Monika Kilnarová	(Slovenia) Nastja Kolar (Spain) Yvonne Cavallé Reimers (Switzerland) Nina Stadler (Romania) Andreea Prisăcariu
March 2	Monastir, Tunisia; Hard; W15; Singles and Doubles Draws	(Germany) Sina Herrmann (Romania) Andreea Prisăcariu; 1–6, 6–3, [10–4]	(Spain) Yvonne Cavallé Reimers (Serbia) Bojana Marinković	(Switzerland) Jenny Dürst (Czech Republic) Monika Kilnarová	(Slovenia) Nastja Kolar (Spain) Yvonne Cavallé Reimers (Switzerland) Nina Stadler (Romania) Andreea Prisăcariu
March 9	Olímpia, Brazil; Clay; W25; Singles and Doubles Draws				
March 9	Olímpia, Brazil; Clay; W25; Singles and Doubles Draws	All competition was cancelled due to the coronavirus pandemic			(Brazil) Ingrid Gamarra Martins (Spain) Andrea Lázaro García (Belgium) Marie Benoît (Chile) Bárbara Gatica (Colombia) Emiliana Arango (Hungary) Panna Udvardy
March 9	Cairo, Egypt; Hard; W25; Singles and Doubles Draws	All competition was cancelled due to the coronavirus pandemic			(United Kingdom) Jodie Burrage
March 9	Irapuato, Mexico; Hard; W25+H; Singles and Doubles Draws	All competition was cancelled due to the coronavirus pandemic			(Australia) Astra Sharma (Mexico) Renata Zarazúa (Serbia) Jovana Jović (Slovakia) Kristína Kučová (Argentina) Nadia Podoroska (Spain) Lara Arruabarrena (United States) Hanna Chang (Romania) Gabriela Talabă
March 9	Potchefstroom, South Africa; Hard; W25; Singles and Doubles Draws	All competition was cancelled due to the coronavirus pandemic			(South Africa) Chanel Simmonds (Germany) Anna Zaja (Switzerland) Svenja Ochsner (Switzerland) Simona Waltert (New Zealand) Paige Hourigan (France) Harmony Tan (France) Caroline Roméo (Russia) Marina Melnikova
March 9	Amiens, France; Clay (indoor); W15+H; Singles and Doubles Draws	All competition was cancelled due to the coronavirus pandemic			(Turkey) İpek Öz (France) Marie Témin (France) Lucie Wargnier (Germany) Anna Gabric (France) Alice Tubello (China) Zheng Qinwen (Italy) Camilla Rosatello (France) Séléna Janicijevic
March 9	Heraklion, Greece; Clay; W15; Singles and Doubles Draws	All competition was cancelled due to the coronavirus pandemic			(Romania) Elena-Teodora Cadar (Russia) Anna Ukolova (Germany) Anna Klasen (Spain) Rebeka Masarova (Croatia) Oleksandra Oliynykova (Germany) Romy Kölzer (Italy) Dalila Spiteri (Spain) Jéssica Bouzas Maneiro
March 9	Cancún, Mexico; Hard; W15; Singles and Doubles Draws	All competition was cancelled due to the coronavirus pandemic			(United States) Anastasia Nefedova (Peru) Dominique Schaefer
March 9	Kazan, Russia; Hard (indoor); W15; Singles and Doubles Draws	All competition was cancelled due to the coronavirus pandemic			(Russia) Polina Kudermetova (Russia) Mariia Tkacheva (Russia) Maria Shusharina (Russia) Polina Bakhmutkina (Russia) Anastasia Tikhonova (Russia) Ekaterina Kazionova (Russia) Ekaterina Reyngold (Czech Republic) Nikola Břečková
March 9	Monastir, Tunisia; Hard; W15; Singles and Doubles Draws	All competition was cancelled due to the coronavirus pandemic			(France) Lou Brouleau (Spain) Yvonne Cavallé Reimers (South Africa) Isabella Kruger (Switzerland) Nina Stadler (Switzerland) Tess Sugnaux (France) Carole Monnet (Germany) Franziska Sziedat (Bosnia and Herzegovina) Nefisa Berberović
March 9	Antalya, Turkey; Clay; W15; Singles and Doubles Draws	All competition was cancelled due to the coronavirus pandemic			(North Macedonia) Lina Gjorcheska (Russia) Taisya Pachkaleva (Germany) Julyette Steur (Spain) Paula Arias Manjón (Belarus) Viktoryia Kanapatskaya (Ukraine) Valeriya Strakhova (Germany) Luisa Meyer auf der Heide (Spain) Carlota Martínez Círez
March 9	Antalya, Turkey; Clay; W15; Singles and Doubles Draws	N/A / N/A vs (Germany) Luisa Meyer auf der Heide / (Germany) Julyette Steur (not played; players reached final by walkover)			(North Macedonia) Lina Gjorcheska (Russia) Taisya Pachkaleva (Germany) Julyette Steur (Spain) Paula Arias Manjón (Belarus) Viktoryia Kanapatskaya (Ukraine) Valeriya Strakhova (Germany) Luisa Meyer auf der Heide (Spain) Carlota Martínez Círez
March 16	Tournaments cancelled due to the coronavirus pandemic				
March 23	Tournaments cancelled due to the coronavirus pandemic				
March 30	Tournaments cancelled due to the coronavirus pandemic				
