= Kentucky Open (tennis) =

- 2020 Kentucky Open (tennis)

Defunct tennis tournament
- Event name: Kentucky Open
- Location: Nicholasville, Kentucky, United States
- Venue: Top Seed Tennis Club
- Category: ITF Women's Circuit
- Surface: Hard / Indoor
- Draw: 32S/32Q/16D
- Prize money: $100,000
- Website: kytennisopen.com

The Kentucky Open is a tournament for professional female tennis players. The event is classified as a $100,000 ITF Women's Circuit tournament and has been held on indoor hardcourts in Nicholasville, Kentucky, United States, since 2020.

== Past finals ==
=== Singles ===
Year	Champion	Runner-up	Score
2020	(Belarus) Olga Govortsova	(United States) Claire Liu	6–4, 6–4

=== Doubles ===
Year	Champions	Runners-up	Score
2020	(United States) Quinn Gleason (United States) Catherine Harrison	(United States) Hailey Baptiste (United States) Whitney Osuigwe	7–5, 6–2
