= 2020 Kentucky Open (tennis) =

- Date: 10–16 February 2020
- Edition: 1st
- Category: ITF Women's World Tennis Tour
- Prize money: $100,000
- Surface: Hard / Indoor
- Location: Nicholasville, Kentucky, United States

Champions

Singles
- (Belarus) Olga Govortsova

Doubles
- (United States) Quinn Gleason / (United States) Catherine Harrison
Kentucky Open	· 2021 →

The 2020 Kentucky Open was a professional tennis tournament played on indoor hard courts. It was the first edition of the tournament which was part of the 2020 ITF Women's World Tennis Tour. It took place in Nicholasville, Kentucky, United States between 10 and 16 February 2020.

== Singles main-draw entrants ==
=== Seeds ===
Country	Player	Rank^{1}	Seed
CZE	Marie Bouzková	60	1
USA	Jessica Pegula	76	2
USA	Madison Brengle	79	3
~~RUS~~	~~Anna Kalinskaya~~	~~109~~	~~4~~
USA	Caty McNally	121	5
AUS	Astra Sharma	124	6
USA	Caroline Dolehide	135	7
USA	Whitney Osuigwe	136	8

- ^{1} Rankings are as of 3 February 2020.

=== Other entrants ===
The following players received wildcards into the singles main draw:

- (United States) ~~Catherine Bellis~~
- (United States) Irina Falconi
- (United States) Claire Liu
- (Indonesia) Aldila Sutjiadi

The following players received entry from the qualifying draw:

- (United States) Hanna Chang
- (United States) Elizabeth Halbauer
- (United States) Jamie Loeb
- (United States) Maria Mateas
- (United States) Grace Min
- (Mexico) Marcela Zacarías
- (Mexico) Renata Zarazúa
- (China) Zhang Yuxuan

The following players received entry as lucky losers:

- (Canada) Françoise Abanda
- (Romania) Gabriela Talabă

== Champions ==
=== Singles ===
- (Belarus) Olga Govortsova def. (United States) Claire Liu, 6–4, 6–4

=== Doubles ===
- (United States) Quinn Gleason / (United States) Catherine Harrison def. (United States) Hailey Baptiste / (United States) Whitney Osuigwe, 7–5, 6–2
