= Zeel Desai =

Indian tennis player

- Country (sports): India
- Born: 18 February 1999 (age 27) Ahmedabad, Gujarat
- Plays: Right (two-handed backhand)
- Prize money: $101,635

Singles
- Career record: 253–180
- Career titles: 5 ITF
- Highest ranking: No. 511 (12 February 2024)
- Current ranking: No. 552 (31 August 2026)

Doubles
- Career record: 122–87
- Career titles: 6 ITF
- Highest ranking: No. 485 (3 March 2025)
- Current ranking: No. 548 (31 August 2026)

Team competitions
- Fed Cup: 1–0
- Last updated on: 2 September 2026.

Zeel Desai (born 18 February 1999) is an Indian tennis player from Ahmedabad.

Desai has a career-high singles ranking of 511 by the WTA, achieved on 12 February 2024. She also has a career-high WTA doubles ranking of 485, attained on 3 March 2025. Desai has won five singles titles and six doubles titles on the ITF Circuit.

Desai represents India competing in the Billie Jean King Cup and made her debut at the 2021 Play-offs against Latvia. In February 2023, she entered the final of the W15 tournament at the Joygaon Academy with a semifinal victory against Vaidehi on her birthday. In the final, she beat qualifier Sandeepti Singh Rao in three sets to win the title. In November 2023, she lost to Shrivalli to finish runner-up at the ITF event on the Bowring Institute clay courts in Bengaluru. In February 2024, Desai won her first match as a wildcard entry into the WTA 125 Mumbai Open against Sapfo Sakellaridi, in straight sets.

== ITF Circuit finals ==
=== Singles: 13 (5 titles, 8 runner-ups) ===
Legend W25/35 tournaments (1–1) W10/15 tournaments (4–7)	Finals by surface Hard (4–5) Clay (1–3)

Result	W–L	Date	Tournament	Tier	Surface	Opponent	Score
Loss	0–1	Sep 2016	ITF Sharm El Sheikh, Egypt	10,000	Hard	(Romania) Ana Bianca Mihăilă	6–3, 5–7, 4–6
Win	1–1	Feb 2017	ITF Gwalior, India	15,000	Hard	(India) Mahak Jain	6–3, 7–5
Loss	1–2	Jun 2018	ITF Guimarães, Portugal	15,000	Hard	(Portugal) Maria João Koehler	1–6, 6–3, 1–6
Loss	1–3	Mar 2020	ITF Cairo, Egypt	W15	Hard	(Egypt) Sandra Samir	7–5, 6–7^{(7)}, 2–6
Loss	1–4	Jan 2021	ITF Monastir, Tunisia	W15	Hard	(France) Salma Djoubri	4–6, 6–3, 2–6
Loss	1–5	Feb 2022	ITF Jhajjar, India	W15	Clay	Anna Ureke	4–6, 6–4, 4–6
Loss	1–6	Feb 2022	ITF Ahmedabad, India	W15	Clay	(Germany) Emily Seibold	2–6, 1–6
Win	2–6	Feb 2023	ITF Jhajjar, India	W15	Clay	(India) Sandeepti Singh Rao	1–6, 6–1, 6–4
Win	3–6	Oct 2023	ITF Monastir, Tunisia	W15	Hard	(United States) Hina Inoue	6–2, 6–4
Loss	3–7	Nov 2023	ITF Bengaluru, India	W25	Clay	(India) Shrivalli Bhamidipaty	0–6, 6–4, 3–6
Loss	3–8	Apr 2025	ITF Monastir, Tunisia	W15	Hard	Anastasiia Gureva	0–6, 0–2 ret.
Win	4–8	Sep 2025	ITF Gurugram, India	W15	Hard	(India) Shruti Ahlawat	2–6, 6–1, 6–4
Win	5–8	Feb 2026	ITF Gurugram, India	W15	Hard	Polina Kuharenko	6–2, 7–6^{(3)}

=== Doubles: 21 (6 titles, 15 runner-ups) ===
Legend W50 tournaments W25/35 tournaments W10/15 tournaments	Finals by surface Hard (6–14) Clay (0–1)

Result	W–L	Date	Tournament	Tier	Surface	Partner	Opponents	Score
Win	1–0	Sep 2016	ITF Sharm El Sheikh, Egypt	10,000	Hard	(Egypt) Ola Abou Zekry	(United Kingdom) Suzy Larkin (Malaysia) Theiviya Selvarajoo	7–5, 6–4
Win	2–0	Sep 2017	ITF Hua Hin, Thailand	15,000	Hard	(India) Pranjala Yadlapalli	(India) Rutuja Bhosale (Australia) Alexandra Walters	6–2, 7–5
Win	3–0	Apr 2018	ITF Hua Hin, Thailand	15,000	Hard	(Thailand) Bunyawi Thamchaiwat	(China) Sheng Yuqi (Indonesia) Aldila Sutjiadi	7–5, 6–1
Loss	3–1	Jun 2018	ITF Guimarães, Portugal	15,000	Hard	(Romania) Cristina Ene	(Romania) Karola Bejenaru (Sweden) Jacqueline Cabaj Awad	1–6, 0–6
Loss	3–2	Jul 2018	ITF Hong Kong	15,000	Hard	(Japan) Akari Inoue	(Hong Kong) Ng Kwan-yau (Hong Kong) Wu Ho-ching	4–6, 4–6
Loss	3–3	Jul 2018	ITF Jakarta, Indonesia	15,000	Hard	(Japan) Mana Ayukawa	(Netherlands) Arianne Hartono (Indonesia) Aldila Sutjiadi	1–6, 2–6
Loss	3–4	Sep 2019	ITF Pretoria, South Africa	W15	Hard	(Netherlands) Merel Hoedt	(France) Caroline Roméo (South Africa) Chanel Simmonds	w/o
Win	4–4	Jan 2020	ITF Monastir, Tunisia	W15	Hard	(Russia) Anastasia Tikhonova	(Serbia) Bojana Marinković (Slovakia) Tereza Mihalíková	7–6^{(4)}, 5–7, [10–5]
Loss	4–5	Mar 2020	ITF Cairo, Egypt	W15	Hard	(Poland) Stefania Rogozińska Dzik	(Sweden) Jacqueline Cabaj Awad (Egypt) Sandra Samir	5–7, 2–6
Loss	4–6	Feb 2023	ITF Jhajjar, India	W15	Clay	(India) Vaidehi Chaudhari	(Latvia) Diāna Marcinkēviča (Sweden) Fanny Östlund	2–6, 1–6
Win	5–6	Feb 2023	ITF Gurugram, India	W15	Hard	(Thailand) Punnin Kovapitukted	(India) Shrivalli Bhamidipaty (India) Vaidehi Chaudhari	6–2, 6–2
Loss	5–7	May 2023	ITF Nakhon Si Thammarat, Thailand	W25	Hard	Anastasia Sukhotina	(India) Shrivalli Bhamidipaty (India) Vaidehi Chaudhari	4–6, 3–6
Loss	5–8	Aug 2023	ITF Nakhon Si Thammarat, Thailand	W25	Hard	(India) Vaidehi Chaudhari	(Thailand) Luksika Kumkhum (South Korea) Park So-hyun	6–7^{(4)}, 0–6
Win	6–8	Oct 2023	ITF Monastir, Tunisia	W15	Hard	Anastasia Sukhotina	(Austria) Arabella Koller (Italy) Camilla Zanolini	6–4, 6–7^{(11)}, [10–7]
Loss	6–9	Jun 2024	ITF Monastir, Tunisia	W15	Hard	(Switzerland) Naïma Karamoko	(China) Xiao Zhenghua (China) Xu Jiayu	6–7^{(7)}, 5–7
Loss	6–10	Aug 2024	ITF Monastir, Tunisia	W15	Hard	(Republic of Ireland) Celine Simunyu	Sofya Gapankova; Kseniya Yersh	2–6, 3–6
Loss	6–11	Dec 2024	ITF Navi Mumbai, India	W50	Hard	(India) Riya Bhatia	(Japan) Kanako Morisaki (Japan) Naho Sato	6–4, 3–6, [7–10]
Loss	6–12	Apr 2025	ITF Monastir, Tunisia	W15	Hard	Anastasiia Gureva	(Denmark) Vilma Krebs Hyllested (Denmark) Johanne Svendsen	0–6, 7–5, [5–10]
Loss	6–13	Apr 2025	ITF Monastir, Tunisia	W15	Hard	Anastasiia Gureva	(United States) Abigail Rencheli (United States) Hibah Shaikh	4–6, 2–6
Loss	6–14	Dec 2025	ITF New Delhi, India	W35	Hard	(India) Vaidehi Chaudhari	(Japan) Hiroko Kuwata; Ekaterina Yashina	2–6, 3–6
Loss	6–15	Dec 2025	ITF Solapur, India	W35	Hard	Elina Nepliy	(India) Vaishnavi Adkar (India) Ankita Raina	6–4, 5–7, [6–10]
