= 2020 Shimadzu All Japan Indoor Tennis Championships – Doubles =

Doubles
- 2020 Shimadzu All Japan Indoor Tennis Championships

Final
- Champions: (Japan) Erina Hayashi (Japan) Moyuka Uchijima
- Runners-up: (Chinese Taipei) Hsieh Yu-chieh (Japan) Minori Yonehara
- Score: 7–5, 5–7, [10–6]

Events
Singles	Doubles
- Shimadzu All Japan Indoor Tennis Championships

At the 2020 Shimadzu All Japan Indoor Tennis Championships, Eri Hozumi and Moyuka Uchijima were the defending doubles champions but chose to participate with different partners. Hozumi partnered Mana Ayukawa, but lost in the first round to Wu Fang-hsien and Zhang Ying.

Uchijima played alongside Erina Hayashi and successfully defended the title, defeating Hsieh Yu-chieh and Minori Yonehara in the final, 7–5, 5–7, [10–6].

== Seeds ==
1. (Japan) Haruka Kaji / (Japan) Junri Namigata (semifinals)
2. (Japan) Miyu Kato / (Japan) Kyōka Okamura (quarterfinals)
3. (Chinese Taipei) Hsieh Yu-chieh / (Japan) Minori Yonehara (final)
4. (Japan) Mana Ayukawa / (Japan) Eri Hozumi (first round)

== Draw ==
Key

- Q = Qualifier
- WC = Wild card
- LL = Lucky loser
- Alt = Alternate
- ITF = ITF entry
- PR = Protected ranking
- SR = Special ranking
- SE = Special exempt
- JE = Junior exempt
- JR = Junior Accelerator Programme entrant
- CO = College Accelerator Programme entrant
- NG = Next Gen Accelerator Program entrant
- w/o = Walkover
- r = Retired
- d = Defaulted

=== Draw ===
First round
1	(Japan) H Kaji (Japan) J Namigata	6	6
WC	(Japan) N Morimoto (Japan) K Osafune	2	1
(Japan) M Hontama (Japan) H Kuwata	3	2
(Japan) A Omae (Thailand) P Plipuech	6	6
3	(Chinese Taipei) Y-c Hsieh (Japan) M Yonehara	7	6
(Hong Kong) K-y Ng (Australia) Ar Rodionova	5	2
(Japan) A Okuno (China) F Xun	6^{6}	3
(Japan) M Kobori (Japan) A Shimizu	7^{8}	6
(Netherlands) I de Vroome (China) Xin Wang	6	6
WC	(Japan) M Imanishi (Japan) R Kajitani	2	2
(Chinese Taipei) F-h Wu (China) Yi Zhang	6	6
4	(Japan) M Ayukawa (Japan) E Hozumi	4	2
(Japan) E Hayashi (Japan) M Uchijima	6	6
(Japan) H Arakawa (China) J Kang	0	3
(United States) E Bektas (United Kingdom) T Moore	7^{7}	4	[2]
2	(Japan) M Kato (Japan) K Okamura	6^{2}	6	[10]

Quarterfinals
1	(Japan) H Kaji (Japan) J Namigata	6	7^{7}
(Japan) A Omae (Thailand) P Plipuech	4	6^{5}
3	(Chinese Taipei) Y-c Hsieh (Japan) M Yonehara	4	6	[11]
(Japan) M Kobori (Japan) A Shimizu	6	4	[9]
(Netherlands) I de Vroome (China) Xin Wang
(Chinese Taipei) F-h Wu (China) Yi Zhang	w/o
(Japan) E Hayashi (Japan) M Uchijima	4	6	[10]
2	(Japan) M Kato (Japan) K Okamura	6	0	[6]

Semifinals
1	(Japan) H Kaji (Japan) J Namigata	6	3	[8]
3	(Chinese Taipei) Y-c Hsieh (Japan) M Yonehara	1	6	[10]
(Chinese Taipei) F-h Wu (China) Yi Zhang	6^{4}	7	[6]
(Japan) E Hayashi (Japan) M Uchijima	7^{7}	5	[10]

Final
3	(Chinese Taipei) Y-c Hsieh (Japan) M Yonehara	5	7	[6]
(Japan) E Hayashi (Japan) M Uchijima	7	5	[10]
