= 2020 Kentucky Open – Doubles =

Doubles
- 2020 Kentucky Open

Final
- Champions: (United States) Quinn Gleason (United States) Catherine Harrison
- Runners-up: (United States) Hailey Baptiste (United States) Whitney Osuigwe
- Score: 7–5, 6–2

Events
Singles	Doubles
Kentucky Open	· 2021 →

This was the first edition of the tournament.

Quinn Gleason and Catherine Harrison won the title, defeating Hailey Baptiste and Whitney Osuigwe in the final, 7–5, 6–2.

== Seeds ==
1. (United States) Caty McNally / (United States) Jessica Pegula (quarterfinals)
2. (Georgia (country)) Sofia Shapatava / (United Kingdom) Emily Webley-Smith (first round)
3. (Indonesia) Beatrice Gumulya / (Indonesia) Jessy Rompies (first round)
4. (Hong Kong) Eudice Chong / (Indonesia) Aldila Sutjiadi (semifinals)

== Draw ==
=== Key ===
- Q = Qualifier
- WC = Wild card
- LL = Lucky loser
- Alt = Alternate
- ITF = ITF entry
- PR = Protected ranking
- SR = Special ranking
- SE = Special exempt
- JE = Junior exempt
- JR = Junior Accelerator Programme entrant
- CO = College Accelerator Programme entrant
- NG = Next Gen Accelerator Program entrant
- w/o = Walkover
- r = Retired
- d = Defaulted

=== Draw ===
First round
1	(United States) C McNally (United States) J Pegula	6	4	[10]
(United States) J Loeb (United States) I Neel	1	6	[8]
WC	(United States) E Halbauer (France) M Partaud	6	4	[11]
(United States) Q Gleason (United States) C Harrison	4	6	[13]
3	(Indonesia) B Gumulya (Indonesia) J Rompies	2	5
(Belarus) O Govortsova (Russia) V Savinykh	6	7
WC	(United States) J Cako (United States) C Whoriskey	6	6
WC	(Venezuela) M Gutiérrez (Mexico) AS Sánchez	1	3
(United States) S Chang (United States) M Sanchez	6	6
(Latvia) D Marcinkēviča (Colombia) C Osorio	3	3
(Chinese Taipei) C-y Hsu (Mexico) M Zacarías	2	1
4	(Hong Kong) E Chong (Indonesia) A Sutjiadi	6	6
(Serbia) J Jović (Australia) A Sharma	6	7^{11}
(United States) R Anderson (France) J Ponchet	2	6^{9}
(United States) H Baptiste (United States) W Osuigwe	1	7	[13]
2	(Georgia (country)) S Shapatava (United Kingdom) E Webley-Smith	6	5	[11]

Quarterfinals
1	(United States) C McNally (United States) J Pegula	4	6	[3]
(United States) Q Gleason (United States) C Harrison	6	2	[10]
(Belarus) O Govortsova (Russia) V Savinykh	6	3	[5]
WC	(United States) J Cako (United States) C Whoriskey	2	6	[10]
(United States) S Chang (United States) M Sanchez	7	2	[11]
4	(Hong Kong) E Chong (Indonesia) A Sutjiadi	5	6	[13]
(Serbia) J Jović (Australia) A Sharma
(United States) H Baptiste (United States) W Osuigwe	w/o

Semifinals
(United States) Q Gleason (United States) C Harrison	6	6
WC	(United States) J Cako (United States) C Whoriskey	4	4
4	(Hong Kong) E Chong (Indonesia) A Sutjiadi	6	6^{6}	[7]
(United States) H Baptiste (United States) W Osuigwe	3	7^{8}	[10]

Final
(United States) Q Gleason (United States) C Harrison	7	6
(United States) H Baptiste (United States) W Osuigwe	5	2
