= 2020 Shimadzu All Japan Indoor Tennis Championships – Singles =

Singles
- 2020 Shimadzu All Japan Indoor Tennis Championships

Final
- Champion: (China) Xun Fangying
- Runner-up: (Netherlands) Indy de Vroome
- Score: 3–6, 6–3, 7–6^{(8–6)}

Events
Singles	Doubles
← 2019 ·	Shimadzu All Japan Indoor Tennis Championships	· 2022 →

Ylena In-Albon was the defending champion, but chose not to participate.

Xun Fangying won the title, defeating Indy de Vroome in the final, 3–6, 6–3, 7–6^{(8–6)}.

== Seeds ==
1. (China) Wang Xinyu (semifinals)
2. (Australia) Arina Rodionova (first round)
3. (China) Xun Fangying (champion)
4. (Netherlands) Indy de Vroome (final)
5. (Japan) Kyōka Okamura (second round)
6. (Japan) Akiko Omae (quarterfinals)
7. (Thailand) Peangtarn Plipuech (first round)
8. (Japan) Ayano Shimizu (quarterfinals)

== Draw ==
=== Key ===
- Q = Qualifier
- WC = Wild card
- LL = Lucky loser
- Alt = Alternate
- SE = Special exempt
- PR = Protected ranking
- ITF = ITF entry
- JE = Junior exempt
- w/o = Walkover
- r = Retired
- d = Defaulted
- SR = Special ranking

=== Finals ===
Semifinals
1	(China) Wang Xinyu	6	4	3
4	(Netherlands) Indy de Vroome	3	6	6
3	(China) Xun Fangying	6	6
Q	(Japan) Erina Hayashi	1	2

Final
4	(Netherlands) Indy de Vroome	6	3	6^{6}
3	(China) Xun Fangying	3	6	7^{8}

=== Top half ===
First round
1	(China) Xin Wang	6	6
WC	(Japan) S Oshino	3	2
(Japan) J Namigata	4	4
(Japan) N Hanatani	6	6
(Japan) M Hontama	1	6	6
(Japan) H Kaji	6	1	3
WC	(Japan) M Kato	4	3
8	(Japan) A Shimizu	6	6
4	(Netherlands) I de Vroome	6	6
Q	(Japan) K Yoshioka	1	3
Q	(China) Yi Zhang	6	3	7^{7}
(Japan) E Hozumi	2	6	6^{1}
(Japan) N Sato	3	5
Q	(China) J Kang	6	7
(United Kingdom) T Moore	7^{7}	6
7	(Thailand) P Plipuech	6^{4}	2

Second round
1	(China) Xin Wang	6	6
(Japan) N Hanatani	1	4
(Japan) M Hontama	7	3	4
8	(Japan) A Shimizu	5	6	6
4	(Netherlands) I de Vroome	6	6
Q	(China) Yi Zhang	2	4
Q	(China) J Kang	6	6
(United Kingdom) T Moore	1	3

Quarterfinals
1	(China) Xin Wang	4	6	6
8	(Japan) A Shimizu	6	1	2
4	(Netherlands) I de Vroome	7^{9}	6
Q	(China) J Kang	6^{7}	1

Semifinals
1	(China) Xin Wang	6	4	3
4	(Netherlands) I de Vroome	3	6	6

=== Bottom half ===
First round
6	(Japan) A Omae	6	6
(Japan) M Kobori	2	1
(Japan) M Uchijima	6^{4}	6	7^{7}
(Japan) M Imanishi	7^{7}	3	6^{3}
Q	(Japan) C Hosonuma	6	6
(Japan) M Ayukawa	3	4
(United States) E Bektas	4	3
3	(China) F Xun	6	6
5	(Japan) K Okamura	6	6
(Japan) H Kuwata	1	3
(Japan) H Arakawa	6	2	6^{3}
Q	(Japan) E Hayashi	2	6	7^{7}
Q	(Japan) A Matsumoto	5	2
(Japan) M Yamaguchi	7	6
(Japan) R Ushijima	6	1	7^{7}
2	(Australia) Ar Rodionova	4	6	6^{3}

Second round
6	(Japan) A Omae	6	6
(Japan) M Uchijima	1	2
Q	(Japan) C Hosonuma	2	4
3	(China) F Xun	6	6
5	(Japan) K Okamura	1	6	4
Q	(Japan) E Hayashi	6	4	6
(Japan) M Yamaguchi	6	6^{5}	2
(Japan) R Ushijima	2	7^{7}	6

Quarterfinals
6	(Japan) A Omae	3	7	5
3	(China) F Xun	6	5	7
Q	(Japan) E Hayashi	6	6
(Japan) R Ushijima	0	2

Semifinals
3	(China) F Xun	6	6
Q	(Japan) E Hayashi	1	2
