= 2020 Shimadzu All Japan Indoor Tennis Championships =

- Date: 10–16 February 2020
- Edition: 2nd
- Category: ITF Women's World Tennis Tour
- Prize money: $60,000
- Surface: Hard / Indoor
- Location: Kyoto, Japan

Champions

Singles
- (China) Xun Fangying

Doubles
- (Japan) Erina Hayashi / (Japan) Moyuka Uchijima
- Shimadzu All Japan Indoor Tennis Championships

The 2020 Shimadzu All Japan Indoor Tennis Championships was a professional tennis tournament played on indoor hardcourts. It was the second edition of the tournament which was part of the 2020 ITF Women's World Tennis Tour. It took place in Kyoto, Japan between 17 and 23 February 2020.

== Singles main-draw entrants ==
=== Seeds ===
| Country | Player | Rank^{1} | Seed |
|---|---|---|---|
| CHN | Wang Xinyu | 141 | 1 |
| AUS | Arina Rodionova | 148 | 2 |
| CHN | Xun Fangying | 206 | 3 |
| NED | Indy de Vroome | 207 | 4 |
| JPN | Kyōka Okamura | 223 | 5 |
| JPN | Akiko Omae | 236 | 6 |
| THA | Peangtarn Plipuech | 286 | 7 |
| JPN | Ayano Shimizu | 290 | 8 |

- ^{1} Rankings are as of 10 February 2020.

=== Other entrants ===
The following players received wildcards into the singles main draw:

- (Japan) Miyu Kato
- (Japan) Suzuho Oshino

The following players received entry from the qualifying draw:

- (Japan) Erina Hayashi
- (Japan) Chisa Hosonuma
- (China) Kang Jiaqi
- (Japan) Ari Matsumoto
- (Japan) Kisa Yoshioka
- (China) Zhang Ying

== Champions ==
=== Singles ===
- (China) Xun Fangying def. (Netherlands) Indy de Vroome, 3–6, 6–3, 7–6^{(8–6)}

=== Doubles ===
- (Japan) Erina Hayashi / (Japan) Moyuka Uchijima def. (Chinese Taipei) Hsieh Yu-chieh / (Japan) Minori Yonehara, 7–5, 5–7, [10–6]
