= 2020 Kentucky Open – Singles =

Singles
- 2020 Kentucky Open

Final
- Champion: (Belarus) Olga Govortsova
- Runner-up: (United States) Claire Liu
- Score: 6–4, 6–4

Events
Singles	Doubles
Kentucky Open	· 2021 →

This was the first edition of the tournament.

Olga Govortsova won the title, defeating Claire Liu in the final, 6–4, 6–4.

== Seeds ==
1. (Czech Republic) Marie Bouzková (quarterfinals)
2. (United States) Jessica Pegula (second round)
3. (United States) Madison Brengle (semifinals)
4. (Russia) Anna Kalinskaya (withdrew)
5. (United States) Caty McNally (second round)
6. (Australia) Astra Sharma (second round)
7. (United States) Caroline Dolehide (first round)
8. (United States) Whitney Osuigwe (second round)

== Draw ==
=== Key ===
- Q = Qualifier
- WC = Wild card
- LL = Lucky loser
- Alt = Alternate
- ITF = ITF entry
- PR = Protected ranking
- SR = Special ranking
- SE = Special exempt
- JE = Junior exempt
- JR = Junior Accelerator Programme entrant
- CO = College Accelerator Programme entrant
- NG = Next Gen Accelerator Program entrant
- w/o = Walkover
- r = Retired
- d = Defaulted

=== Finals ===
Semifinals
LL	(Canada) Françoise Abanda	2	1
WC	(United States) Claire Liu	6	6
3	(United States) Madison Brengle	4	3
(Belarus) Olga Govortsova	6	6

Final
WC	(United States) Claire Liu	4	4
(Belarus) Olga Govortsova	6	6

=== Top half ===
First round
1	(Czech Republic) M Bouzková	6	6
(Japan) M Hibi	1	2
(Paraguay) V Cepede Royg	7^{7}	6
(France) J Ponchet	6^{4}	3
(Russia) V Savinykh	4	6	1
LL	(Canada) F Abanda	6	4	6
Q	(Mexico) M Zacarías	4	3
5	(United States) C McNally	6	6
LL	(Romania) G Talabă	4	7^{7}	6
Q	(Mexico) R Zarazúa	6	6^{2}	2
(United States) R Anderson	4	6	6
Q	(China) Y Zhang	6	3	3
Q	(United States) J Loeb	2	6^{4}
(Ukraine) A Kalinina	6	7^{7}
WC	(United States) C Liu	6	6
7	(United States) C Dolehide	1	4

Second round
1	(Czech Republic) M Bouzková	6	6
(Paraguay) V Cepede Royg	4	4
LL	(Canada) F Abanda	7	6
5	(United States) C McNally	5	4
LL	(Romania) G Talabă	6^{6}	6	6
(United States) R Anderson	7^{8}	4	2
(Ukraine) A Kalinina	1	4
WC	(United States) C Liu	6	6

Quarterfinals
1	(Czech Republic) M Bouzková	7^{7}	6^{6}	4
LL	(Canada) F Abanda	6^{2}	7^{8}	6
LL	(Romania) G Talabă	5	1
WC	(United States) C Liu	7	6

Semifinals
LL	(Canada) F Abanda	2	1
WC	(United States) C Liu	6	6

=== Bottom half ===
First round
8	(United States) W Osuigwe	6	6
WC	(Indonesia) A Sutjiadi	3	3
(Belgium) Y Wickmayer	6	4	6
Q	(United States) E Halbauer	0	6	1
Q	(United States) H Chang	7^{7}	3	6
(Colombia) C Osorio	6^{5}	6	2
WC	(United States) I Falconi	6	0	1^{r}
3	(United States) M Brengle	4	6	2
6	(Australia) A Sharma	6	6
Q	(United States) M Mateas	1	3
(Belarus) O Govortsova	6	6
Q	(United States) G Min	4	4
(United States) D Lao	3	6^{3}
(Germany) M Barthel	6	7^{7}
(Serbia) J Jović	4	4
2	(United States) J Pegula	6	6

Second round
8	(United States) W Osuigwe	3	4
(Belgium) Y Wickmayer	6	6
Q	(United States) H Chang	4	4
3	(United States) M Brengle	6	6
6	(Australia) A Sharma	1	0
(Belarus) O Govortsova	6	6
(Germany) M Barthel	7^{7}	5	6
2	(United States) J Pegula	6^{1}	7	4

Quarterfinals
(Belgium) Y Wickmayer	2	6	1
3	(United States) M Brengle	6	4	6
(Belarus) O Govortsova	6	7
(Germany) M Barthel	4	5

Semifinals
3	(United States) M Brengle	4	3
(Belarus) O Govortsova	6	6
