= Hailey Baptiste =

American tennis player (born 2001)

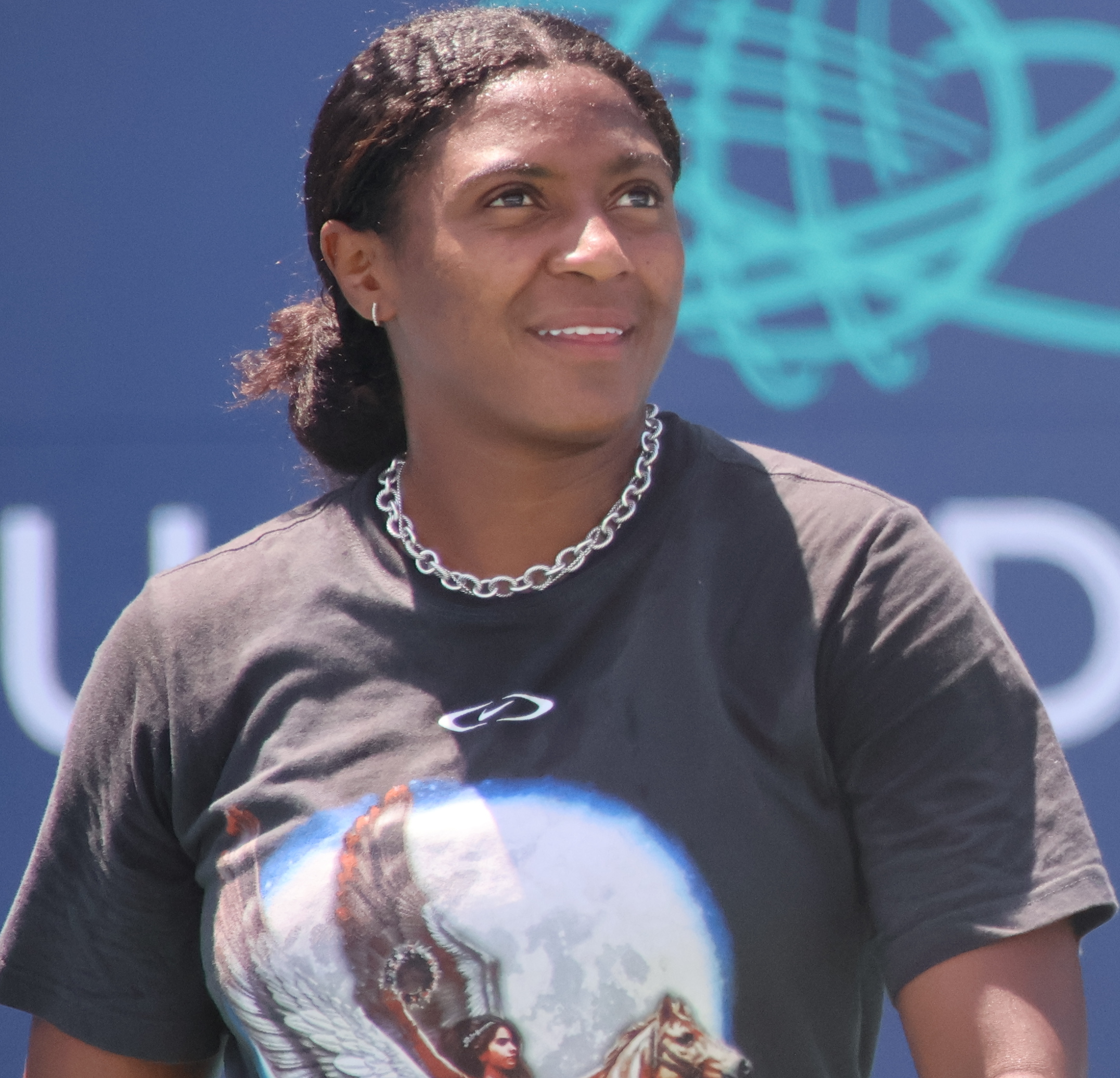
- Baptiste at the 2025 Mubadala Citi DC Open
- Country (sports): United States
- Born: November 3, 2001 (age 25) Washington, D.C., US
- Height: 1.70 m (5 ft 7 in)
- Plays: Right (two-handed backhand)
- Coach: Will Woodall
- Prize money: $3,633,200

Singles
- Career record: 243–172
- Career titles: 0 WTA, 4 ITF
- Highest ranking: No. 25 (May 4, 2026)
- Current ranking: No. 39 (September 14, 2026)

Grand Slam singles results
- Australian Open: 3R (2026)
- French Open: 4R (2025)
- Wimbledon: 3R (2025)
- US Open: 2R (2025)

Doubles
- Career record: 77–65
- Career titles: 1 WTA, 2 WTA 125
- Highest ranking: No. 92 (July 22, 2024)
- Current ranking: No. 214 (September 14, 2026)

Grand Slam doubles results
- Australian Open: 3R (2026)
- French Open: 1R (2024, 2025)
- Wimbledon: 2R (2024)
- US Open: 2R (2022)
- Last updated on: September 17, 2026.

Hailey Baptiste (born November 3, 2001) is an American professional tennis player. She has a career-high WTA singles ranking of world No. 25, achieved on May 4, 2026 and a best in doubles of No. 92, reached on July 22, 2024.

Baptiste has won one doubles title on the WTA Tour and two titles on the WTA Challenger Tour. She has also won four singles and four doubles titles on the ITF Women's Circuit.

== Career ==
=== Juniors ===
On the junior tour, she reached a career-high ranking of No. 38 on 29 January 2018. She ended runner-up at the US Open junior doubles' tournament in 2018.

=== 2019–2022: WTA Tour, US Open debut ===
Baptiste made her WTA Tour main-draw debut at her hometown tournament, the 2019 Washington Open, and defeated major finalist and former top-ten player, Madison Keys.

She made her major debut at the 2020 US Open as a wildcard player.

Baptiste made her WTA 1000 debut at the 2021 Miami Open, after reaching the main draw having received a wildcard for the qualifying competition.

On her debut at the French Open, she qualified for the main draw and recorded her first win at a major over Anna Blinkova.

=== 2023–24: First WTA 1000 match win, top 100 ===
Baptiste received a wildcard for the main draw at the 2023 Miami Open.

At the WTA 1000 2023 Guadalajara Open, she defeated wildcard player Lya Isabel Fernández Olivares and 16th seed Karolína Plíšková for the second time in the season having prevailed also earlier at the Washington Open, to reach the third round of a WTA 1000 for the first time.

Following her first round main-draw win as a qualifier at the 2024 Indian Wells Open over fellow American qualifier Robin Montgomery, she reached the top 100 in the rankings on 18 March 2024. She received a wildcard for the main draw at the Miami Open.

At the French Open, she entered the main draw as a lucky loser and defeated Kayla Day for her second win at this major.

At the WTA 500 Korea Open, Baptiste defeated compatriot Sloane Stephens in straight sets. At the WTA 1000 China Open where she qualified for the main draw, she also recorded a first round victory over Varvara Gracheva. With her second round win over seventh seed Barbora Krejčíková at the Wuhan Open as a qualifier, Baptiste became the first player ranked outside the top 100 (at No. 102) to defeat a top-10 since the inception of the tournament. Krejčíková led 5-3, 40-0 in the second set before Baptiste won in straight sets, recording her first top 10 win and reaching her second third round at a 1000-level in her career.

=== 2025: Wimbledon third round, top 50 ===
Baptiste made her debut for the United States Billie Jean King Cup team in the 2025 qualifying round held in Bratislava, defeating Rebecca Munk Mortensen and Renáta Jamrichová in wins over Denmark and Slovakia respectively as her country topped the group to make it through to the finals.

At the 2025 French Open, she reached the fourth round of a Grand Slam for the first time in her career with wins over 23rd seed Beatriz Haddad Maia, Nao Hibino, and Jéssica Bouzas Maneiro. Despite losing to compatriot and reigning Australian Open champion Madison Keys in straight sets, Baptiste climbed to a new career-high ranking of world No. 58 on 9 June 2025.

Baptiste made her main-draw debut at Wimbledon where she reached the third round for the first time, defeating lucky loser Victoria Mboko, before falling to another teenager, sixth seed Mirra Andreeva, in straight sets. As a result, her ranking climbed inside the top 50 for the first time to No. 48 on 14 July 2025.

=== 2026: Madrid SF, win over No. 1, top 25 & injury at the French Open ===
In January, Baptiste reached the third round of the 2026 Australian Open for the first time, defeating Taylor Townsend and Storm Hunter before falling to longtime friend Coco Gauff. In Abu Dhabi, she advanced to the WTA 500 event semifinals with wins over compatriot Emma Navarro and Liudmila Samsonova, before losing in three sets to world No. 11, Ekaterina Alexandrova. As a result, she reached a new career-high of No. 39 on 9 February 2026.

At the Miami Open, Baptiste defeated three top-30 players in a row, 19th seed Liudmila Samsonova again, ninth seed Elina Svitolina (also her second top-10 win) and 25th seed Jelena Ostapenko to reach her first WTA 1000 quarterfinal.

At the Madrid Open, Baptiste reached the semifinals of a WTA 1000 for the first time with a defeat of the world No. 1 and defending champion, Aryna Sabalenka, after saving six match points. As a result, she reached the top 25 in the singles rankings. She lost in her semifinal match to Mirra Andreeva.

During her second-round match at the French Open, Baptiste suffered a serious knee injury and was forced to retire in tears against Wang Xiyu.

According to reports confirmed by her agent, Jill Smoller, Baptiste sustained injuries to the anterior cruciate ligament (ACL) and meniscus in her left knee. She was expected to undergo surgery and could remain sidelined for at least six months.

The injury occurred late in the opening set when Baptiste landed awkwardly while attempting to return a shot near the baseline. Unable to continue, she retired from the match while trailing 5–4. She later left the court in a wheelchair and subsequently withdrew from the women’s doubles event, where she had been scheduled to partner Venus Williams.

The setback interrupted what had been the best season of her career. Earlier in 2026, Baptiste reached a career-high ranking of world No. 25 after strong performances at WTA 1000 tournaments in Miami and Madrid, including a semifinal run in Madrid, highlighted by a victory over world No. 1 Sabalenka. She also recorded a first-round victory over former Roland Garros champion Barbora Krejčíková at the tournament.

== World Team Tennis ==
Baptiste made her World TeamTennis debut in 2020 with the Vegas Rollers as an alternate, later ending up on the roster for the New York Empire in the 2020 season at The Greenbrier.

== Personal life ==
Baptiste is of Haitian descent.

== Performance timelines ==
Key
W	F	SF	QF	#R	RR	Q#	P#	DNQ	A	Z#	PO	G	S	B	NMS	NTI	P	NH

(W) winner; (F) finalist; (SF) semifinalist; (QF) quarterfinalist; (#R) rounds 4, 3, 2, 1; (RR) round-robin stage; (Q#) qualification round; (P#) preliminary round; (DNQ) did not qualify; (A) absent; (Z#) Davis/Fed Cup Zonal Group (with number indication) or (PO) play-off; (G) gold, (S) silver or (B) bronze Olympic/Paralympic medal; (NMS) not a Masters tournament; (NTI) not a Tier I tournament; (P) postponed; (NH) not held; (SR) strike rate (events won / competed); (W–L) win–loss record.
To avoid confusion and double counting, these charts are updated at the conclusion of a tournament or when the player's participation has ended.

Only main-draw results in WTA Tour, Grand Slam tournaments, Fed Cup/Billie Jean King Cup and Olympic Games are included in win–loss records.

=== Singles ===
Current through the 2026 French Open.

Tournament	2018	2019	2020	2021	2022	2023	2024	2025	2026	SR	W–L	Win%
Grand Slam tournaments
Australian Open	A	A	Q2	Q2	2R	Q1	Q3	1R	3R	0 / 3	3–3	50%
French Open	A	A	A	2R	1R	A	2R	4R	2R	0 / 5	6–5	55%
Wimbledon	A	A	NH	A	A	A	Q2	3R	A	0 / 1	2–1	67%
US Open	A	Q2	1R	1R	Q1	Q1	Q3	2R	A	0 / 3	1–3	25%
Win–loss	0–0	0–0	0–1	1–2	1–2	0–0	1–1	6–4	3–2	0 / 12	12–12	50%
WTA 1000 tournaments
Qatar Open	A	NTI	A	NTI	A	NTI	A	Q1	A	0 / 0	0–0	–
Dubai Championships	NTI	A	NTI	A	NTI	A	A	A	1R	0 / 1	0–1	0%
Indian Wells Open	A	A	NH	Q1	1R	A	2R	2R	2R	0 / 4	3–4	43%
Miami Open	A	A	NH	1R	1R	1R	1R	3R	QF	0 / 6	6–6	50%
Madrid Open	A	A	NH	A	A	A	1R	2R	SF	0 / 3	5–3	63%
Italian Open	A	A	A	A	A	A	Q1	3R	3R	0 / 2	3–2	60%
Canadian Open	A	A	NH	A	A	A	A	2R	A	0 / 1	1–1	50%
Cincinnati Open	A	A	A	A	Q1	A	Q1	1R	A	0 / 1	0–1	0%
China Open	A	A	NH			A	2R	1R		0 / 2	1–2	33%
Wuhan Open	A	A	NH				3R	2R		0 / 2	3–2	60%
Guadalajara Open	NH				A	3R	NTI		A	0 / 1	2–1	67%
Career statistics
Tournaments	0	1	1	6	7	4	12	19	11	Career total: 61		
Overall win–loss	0–0	1–1	0–1	3–6	3–7	4–4	7–12	22–19	16–11	0 / 61	56–61	48%
Year-end ranking	457	285	231	160	181	131	93	61		$3,633,200		

=== Doubles ===
Tournament	2019	2020	2021	2022	2023	2024	2025	2026	W–L
Grand Slam tournaments
Australian Open	A	A	A	A			1R	3R	2–2
French Open	A	A	A	A		1R	1R	A	0–2
Wimbledon	A	NH	A	A		2R	1R	A	1–2
US Open	1R	1R	1R	2R		1R	1R	A	1–6
Win–loss	0–1	0–1	0–1	1–1		1–3	0–4	2–1	4–12
WTA 1000 tournaments
Qatar Open	A	A	A	A				A	0–0
Dubai Championships	A	A	A	A				A	0–0
Indian Wells	A	NH	A	A		1R		2R	1–2
Miami Open	A	NH	1R	A				1R	0–2
Madrid Open	A	NH	A	A				A	0–0
Italian Open	A	A	A	A				1R	0–1
Canadian Open	A	NH	A	A				A	0–0
Cincinnati Open	A	A	A	A		A	2R	A	1–1
Mexican Open	NH					NTI			0–0
China Open	A	NH							0–0
Wuhan Open	A	NH							0–0

== WTA Tour finals ==
=== Doubles: 1 (title) ===
Legend WTA 250 (1–0)	Finals by surface Clay (1–0)	Finals by setting Outdoor (1–0)

Result	W–L	Date	Tournament	Tier	Surface	Partner	Opponents	Score
Win	1–0	Apr 2021	Charleston Open, US	WTA 250	Clay	(United States) Caty McNally	(Australia) Ellen Perez (Australia) Storm Sanders	6–7^{(4)}, 6–4, [10–6]

== WTA 125 finals ==
=== Doubles: 3 (2 titles, 1 runner-up) ===
Result	W–L	Date	Tournament	Surface	Partner	Opponents	Score
Loss	0–1	Aug 2023	Golden Gate Open, United States	Hard	(United States) Claire Liu	(United Kingdom) Jodie Burrage (Australia) Olivia Gadecki	6–7^{(4)}, 7–6^{(6)}, [8–10]
Win	1–1	Nov 2023	Midland Tennis Classic, United States	Hard (i)	(United States) Whitney Osuigwe	(United States) Sophie Chang (United States) Ashley Lahey	2–6, 6–2, [10–1]
Win	2–1	Jun 2024	Veneto Open, Italy	Grass	(United States) Alycia Parks	(Czech Republic) Miriam Kolodziejová (Czech Republic) Anna Sisková	7–6^{(4)}, 6–2

== ITF Circuit finals ==
=== Singles: 6 (4 titles, 2 runner-ups) ===
Legend W60 tournaments (1–0) W50 tournaments (0–1) W25 tournaments (3–1)	Finals by surface Hard (2–1) Clay (2–1)

Result	W–L	Date	Tournament	Tier	Surface	Opponent	Score
Win	1–0	Jan 2019	ITF Plantation, US	W25	Clay	(Hungary) Anna Bondár	7–5, 6–7^{(6)}, 6–2
Win	2–0	Jun 2019	ITF Sumter, US	W25	Hard	(United States) Victoria Duval	6–2, 7–5
Win	3–0	Nov 2019	ITF Tucson, US	W25	Hard	(Mexico) Marcela Zacarías	4–6, 6–4, 6–3
Loss	3–1	Apr 2023	ITF Boca Raton, US	W25	Clay	(United States) Caroline Dolehide	4–6, 4–6
Win	4–1	Jun 2023	Internazionali di Caserta, Italy	W60	Clay	(Cyprus) Raluca Șerban	6–3, 6–2
Loss	4–2	Feb 2024	ITF Morelia, Mexico	W50	Hard	(Spain) Jéssica Bouzas Maneiro	7–6^{(11)}, 1–6, 6–7^{(1)}

=== Doubles: 9 (4 titles, 5 runner-ups) ===
Legend W100 tournaments (2–1) W60/75 tournaments (1–3) W25 tournaments (1–1)	Finals by surface Hard (3–3) Clay (1–2)

Result	W–L	Date	Tournament	Tier	Surface	Partner	Opponents	Score
Loss	0–1	Jan 2019	ITF Daytona Beach, US	W25	Clay	(United States) Emina Bektas	(Hungary) Anna Bondár (Norway) Ulrikke Eikeri	3–6, 7–5, [9–11]
Loss	0–2	Feb 2020	Kentucky Open, US	W100	Hard (i)	(United States) Whitney Osuigwe	(United States) Quinn Gleason (United States) Catherine Harrison	5–7, 2–6
Win	1–2	Jan 2022	ITF Orlando Pro, US	W60	Hard	(United States) Whitney Osuigwe	(United States) Angela Kulikov (United States) Rianna Valdes	7–6^{(7)}, 7–5
Loss	1–3	Jan 2023	Canberra International, Australia	W60	Hard	(United States) Robin Anderson	(Russia) Irina Khromacheva (Russia) Anastasia Tikhonova	4–6, 5–7
Win	2–3	Mar 2023	ITF Boca Raton, US	W25	Hard	(United States) Whitney Osuigwe	(United States) Francesca Di Lorenzo (United States) Makenna Jones	6–2, 6–2
Win	3–3	Nov 2023	ITF Charleston Pro, US	W100	Clay	(United States) Whitney Osuigwe	(Uzbekistan) Nigina Abduraimova (France) Carole Monnet	6–4, 3–6, [13–11]
Loss	3–4	Jan 2024	Vero Beach Open, US	W75+H	Clay	(United States) Whitney Osuigwe	(United States) Allura Zamarripa (United States) Maribella Zamarripa	3–6, 6–3, [4–10]
Loss	3–5	Jan 2024	Georgia's Rome Open, US	W75	Hard (i)	(United States) Whitney Osuigwe	(United States) Angela Kulikov (United States) Jamie Loeb	walkover
Win	4–5	Feb 2024	Guanajuato Open, Mexico	W100	Hard	(United States) Whitney Osuigwe	(United States) Ann Li (Canada) Rebecca Marino	7–5, 6–4

== Junior Grand Slam tournament finals ==
=== Doubles: 1 (runner-up) ===
Result	Year	Tournament	Surface	Partner	Opponents	Score
Loss	2018	US Open	Hard	(United States) Dalayna Hewitt	(United States) Caty McNally (United States) Coco Gauff	3–6, 2–6

== Head-to-head records ==
=== Record against top 10 players ===
- Baptiste has a 4–5 record against players who were, at the time the match was played, ranked in the top 10.

#	W–L	Opponent	Rank	Event	Surface	Round	Score	HBR
2024
1.	1–3	(Czech Republic) Barbora Krejčíková	No. 10	Wuhan Open, China	Hard	2R	6–3, 7–5	No. 102
2026
2.	2–4	(Ukraine) Elina Svitolina	No. 8	Miami Open, US	Hard	3R	6–3, 7–5	No. 45
3.	3–5	(Italy) Jasmine Paolini	No. 9	Madrid Open, Spain	Clay	3R	7–5, 6–3	No. 32
4.	4–5	Aryna Sabalenka	No. 1	Madrid Open, Spain	Clay	QF	2–6, 6–2, 7–6^{(8–6)}	No. 32
